= China at the 2018 Summer Youth Olympics =

- IOC code: CHN
- NOC: Chinese Olympic Committee
- Website: www.olympic.cn (in Chinese and English)

in Buenos Aires
- Competitors: 82 in 26 sports
- Flag bearer: Wang Yunzhang
- Medals Ranked 2nd: Gold 18 Silver 9 Bronze 9 Total 36

Summer Youth Olympics appearances (overview)
- 2010; 2014; 2018; 2026

China competed at the 2018 Summer Youth Olympics, in Buenos Aires, Argentina from 6 October to 18 October 2018.

== Medals ==
Medals awarded to participants of mixed-NOC (combined) teams are represented in italics. These medals are not counted towards the individual NOC medal tally.

Medal	Name	Sport	Event	Date
Gold	Zhang Mengyao	Archery	Girls' individual	17 October
Gold	Chen Long	Athletics	Boys' high jump	14 October
Gold	Xi Ricuo	Athletics	Girls' 5000 metre walk	16 October
Gold	Li Xinhui	Athletics	Girls' shot put	15 October
Gold	Li Shifeng	Badminton	Boys' singles	12 October
Gold	Lin Shan	Diving	Girls' 3 m springboard	15 October
Gold	Lin Shan	Diving	Girls' 10 m platform	13 October
Gold	Lin Shan	Diving	Mixed team	17 October
Gold	Yin Dehang	Gymnastics	Boys' pommel horse	13 October
Gold	Tang Xijing	Gymnastics	Girls' Balance beam	15 October
Gold	Fu Fantao	Gymnastics	Boys trampoline	14 October
Gold	Fan Xinyi	Gymnastics	Girls trampoline	14 October
Gold	Fan Xinyi	Gymnastics	multi-discipline	14 October
Gold	Yewen Gu	Modern pentathlon	Mixed relay	16 October
Gold	Sun Jiajun	Swimming	Boys' 100 metre breaststroke	8 October
Gold	Peng Xuwei; Zheng Muyan; Lin Xintong; Yang Junxuan	Swimming	4 × 100 metre medley relay	8 October
Gold	Peng Xuwei; Sun Jiajun; Hong Jinquan; Yang Junxuan	Swimming	Mixed 4 × 100 metre medley relay	12 October
Gold	Wang Chuqin	Table tennis	Boys' singles	10 October
Gold	Sun Yingsha	Table tennis	Girls' singles	15 October
Gold	Wang Chuqin; Sun Yingsha	Table tennis	Mixed team	15 October
Gold	Zhou Xinru	Wrestling	Girls' freestyle -65kg	13 October
Silver	Xing Jialiang	Athletics	Boys' shot put	15 October
Silver	Wang Zhiyi	Badminton	Girls' singles	12 October
Silver	Guan Changheng	Canoeing	K1 slalom	16 October
Silver	Lian Junjie	Diving	Boys' 3 m springboard	16 October
Silver	Lian Junjie	Diving	Mixed team	17 October
Silver	Yin Dehang	Gymnastics	Boys' parallel bars	15 October
Silver	Sun Jiajun	Swimming	Boys' 50 metre breaststroke	12 October
Silver	Wang Guanbin; Sun Jiajun; Shen Jiahao; Hong Jinquan	Swimming	Boys' 4 × 100 metre medley relay	10 October
Silver	Yang Junxuan	Swimming	Girls' 100 metre freestyle	9 October
Silver	Yang Junxuan	Swimming	Girls' 200 metre freestyle	10 October
Bronze	Wang Qi	Athletics	Boys' hammer throw	15 October
Bronze	Wenquian Cai; Ruirui Cao; Yunxia Fan; Yangyan Gu; Ning Ma; Anhui Yu; Heyang Zhang; Xinyi Zhu; Meirong Zou	Field hockey	Girls' tournament	14 October
Bronze	Yin Dehang	Gymnastics	Boys' rings	14 October
Bronze	Tang Xijing	Gymnastics	Girls' uneven bars	13 October
Bronze	Yang Junxuan	Swimming	Girls' 50 metre freestyle	12 October
Bronze	Shen Jiahao; Hong Jinquan; Lin Xintong; Yang Junxuan	Swimming	Mixed 4 × 100 metre freestyle relay	7 October
Bronze	Cao Zihan	Taekwondo	Girls' 49 kg	8 October
Bronze	Mu Wenzhe	Taekwondo	Girls' +63 kg	11 October
Bronze	Xin Wang; Xiy Wang	Tennis	Girls' doubles	13 Oct

Medals by sport
Sport	1st place, gold medalist(s)	2nd place, silver medalist(s)	3rd place, bronze medalist(s)	Total
Archery	1	0	0	1
Athletics	3	1	1	5
Badminton	1	1	0	2
Canoeing	0	1	0	1
Diving	2	1	0	3
Field hockey	0	0	1	1
Gymnastics	4	1	2	7
Swimming	3	4	2	9
Table tennis	3	0	0	3
Taekwondo	0	0	2	2
Tennis	0	0	1	1
Wrestling	1	0	0	1
Total	18	9	9	36

== Archery ==
China qualified two archers based on its performance at the 2017 World Archery Youth Championships.

Individual

Athlete	Event	Ranking round		Round of 32	Round of 16	Quarterfinals	Semifinals	Final / BM	Rank
Athlete	Event	Score	Seed	Opposition Score	Opposition Score	Opposition Score	Opposition Score	Opposition Score	Rank
Feng Hao	Boys' individual	688	3	Roux (RSA); W 6–0	Dalpatadu (SRI); L 5–6	did not advance			9
Zhang Mengyao	Girls' individual	675	1	Shapla (BAN); W 6–0	Voropayeva (KAZ); W 7–1	Hnin (MYA); W 6–0	Son (KOR); W 6–4	Canales (ESP); W 6–2	1st place, gold medalist(s)

Team

Athletes	Event	Ranking round		Round of 32	Round of 16	Quarterfinals	Semifinals	Final / BM	Rank
Athletes	Event	Score	Seed	Opposition Score	Opposition Score	Opposition Score	Opposition Score	Opposition Score	Rank
Feng Hao (CHN); Jil Walter (SAM)	Mixed Team	1278	27	Sliachticas Caetano (BRA); Roos (BEL); L 2–6	did not advance				17
Zhang Mengyao (CHN); Leonardo Tura (SMR)	Mixed Team	1259	32	Amr Said Mohamed Azzam (EGY); Potrafke (GER); L 1–5	did not advance				17

== Athletics ==
Boys
Track and road events

Athlete	Event	Stage 1		Stage 2		Total	
Athlete	Event	Result	Rank	Result	Rank	Total	Rank
He Yuhong	Boys' 100 metres	11.15	16	10.75	18	21.90	18
Wang Xin	Boys' 5000 metre walk	20:28.02	3	DNF			

Field events

Athlete	Event	Stage 1		Stage 2		Total	
Athlete	Event	Result	Rank	Result	Rank	Total	Rank
Chen Long	Boys' high jump	2.13	1	2.22	1	4.35	1st place, gold medalist(s)
Xing Jialiang	Boys' shot put	20.85	3	20.89	2	41.74	2nd place, silver medalist(s)
Wang Qi	Boys' hammer throw	79.46	3	75.90	3	155.36	3rd place, bronze medalist(s)

Girls
Track and road events

Athlete	Event	Stage 1		Stage 2		Total	
Athlete	Event	Result	Rank	Result	Rank	Total	Rank
Xi Ricuo	Girls' 5000 metre walk	22:23.26	1	22:40.23	1	45:03.49	1st place, gold medalist(s)

Field events

Athlete	Event	Stage 1		Stage 2		Total	
Athlete	Event	Result	Rank	Result	Rank	Total	Rank
Liu Yiwen	Girls' high jump	1.70	11	1.68	15	3.38	14
Li Xinhui	Girls' shot put	18.42	1	18.33	1	36.75	1st place, gold medalist(s)
Liu Quantong	Girls' discus throw	50.30	4	49.36	5	100.40	5
Wang Ying	Girls' javelin throw	54.77	5	57.14	2	111.91	4

== Badminton ==
China qualified three players based on the Badminton Junior World Rankings.

Individual

Athlete	Event	Group stage				Quarterfinal	Semifinal	Final / BM	Rank
Athlete	Event	Opposition Score	Opposition Score	Opposition Score	Rank	Opposition Score	Opposition Score	Opposition Score	Rank
Li Shifeng	Boys' singles	Julien Carraggi (BEL); W 2–0	Tomás Toledano (ESP); W 2–0	Giovanni Toti (ITA); W 2–0	1 Q	Nhat Nguyen (IRL); W 2–1	Arnaud Merklé (FRA); W 2–0	Lakshya Sen (IND); W 2–0	1st place, gold medalist(s)
Wang Zhiyi	Girls' singles	Hirari Mizui (JPN); W 2–1	Léonice Huet (FRA); W 2–0	Halla Bouksani (ALG); W 2–0	1 Q	Huang Yin-hsuan (TPE); W 2–0	Jaslyn Hooi (SGP) W 2–0	Goh Jin Wei (MAS) L 1–2	2nd place, silver medalist(s)

Team

Athlete	Event	Group stage				Quarterfinal	Semifinal	Final / BM	Rank
Athlete	Event	Opposition Score	Opposition Score	Opposition Score	Rank	Opposition Score	Opposition Score	Opposition Score	Rank
Team Gamma; Li Shifeng (CHN); Uriel Canjura (ESA); Joel Koh (SGP); Alonso Medel (CHI); Halla Bouksani (ALG); Fernanda Saponara Rivva (PER); Jakka Vaishnavi Reddy (IND)	Mixed Teams	Omega (MIX); L (99–110)	Sigma (MIX); L (86–110)	Theta (MIX); W (110–107)	3Q	Alpha (MIX); L (94–110)	did not advance		5
Team Sigma; Wang Zhiyi (CHN); Dennis Koppen (NED); Rukesh Maharjan (NEP); Ikhsan Rumbay (INA); Cristian Savin (MDA); Madeleine Caren Akoumba Ze (CMR); Grace King (GBR); Ann-Kathrin Spöri (GER)	Mixed Teams	Theta (MIX); W (110–100)	Gamma (MIX); W (110–86)	Omega (MIX); L (98–110)	2Q	Zeta (MIX); L (106–110)	did not advance		5

== Basketball ==
China qualified a boys' and girls' team based on the U18 3x3 National Federation Ranking.

- Boys' tournament – 1 team of 4 athletes
  - Tianyi Chu
  - Jiwang Guo
  - Zipeng Wang
  - Wang Yunzhang
- Girls' tournament – 1 team of 4 athletes
  - Ding Kangche
  - Zhang Rui
  - Han Xu
  - Hao Zheng

Event	Group stage					Quarterfinal	Semifinal	Final / BM	
Event	Opposition Score	Opposition Score	Opposition Score	Opposition Score	Rank	Opposition Score	Opposition Score	Opposition Score	Rank
Boys' tournament	Slovenia; L 18-21	Georgia; W 16-14	Turkmenistan; L 10-15	Jordan; W 21-11	3	did not advance			
Girls' tournament	Hungary; L 13-21	Germany; W 18-12	Romania; W 18-14	Iran; W 15-13	2	Argentina; W 19-17	United States; L 9-20	Australia; L 13-16	4

== Beach volleyball ==
China qualified a girls' team based on its performance at the 2018 Asian U19 Championship.

- Girls' tournament – 1 team of 2 athletes

Athlete	Event	Group stage				Round of 24	Round of 16	Quarterfinal	Semifinal	Final / BM	Rank
Athlete	Event	Opposition Score	Opposition Score	Opposition Score	Rank	Opposition Score	Opposition Score	Opposition Score	Opposition Score	Opposition Score	Rank
J.J. Zeng–Sh. T. Cao	Girls' tournament	Gierczynska–Jundziłł (POL); W 2–1	Niro–Nada (EGY); W 2–0	Juárez–Alvarado (GUA); W 2–0	1	Bye	Romero–Gutiérrez (MEX); W 2–0	Scampoli–Bertozzi (ITA); L 0–2	did not advance		

== Canoeing ==
China qualified one boat based on its performance at the 2018 World Qualification Event.

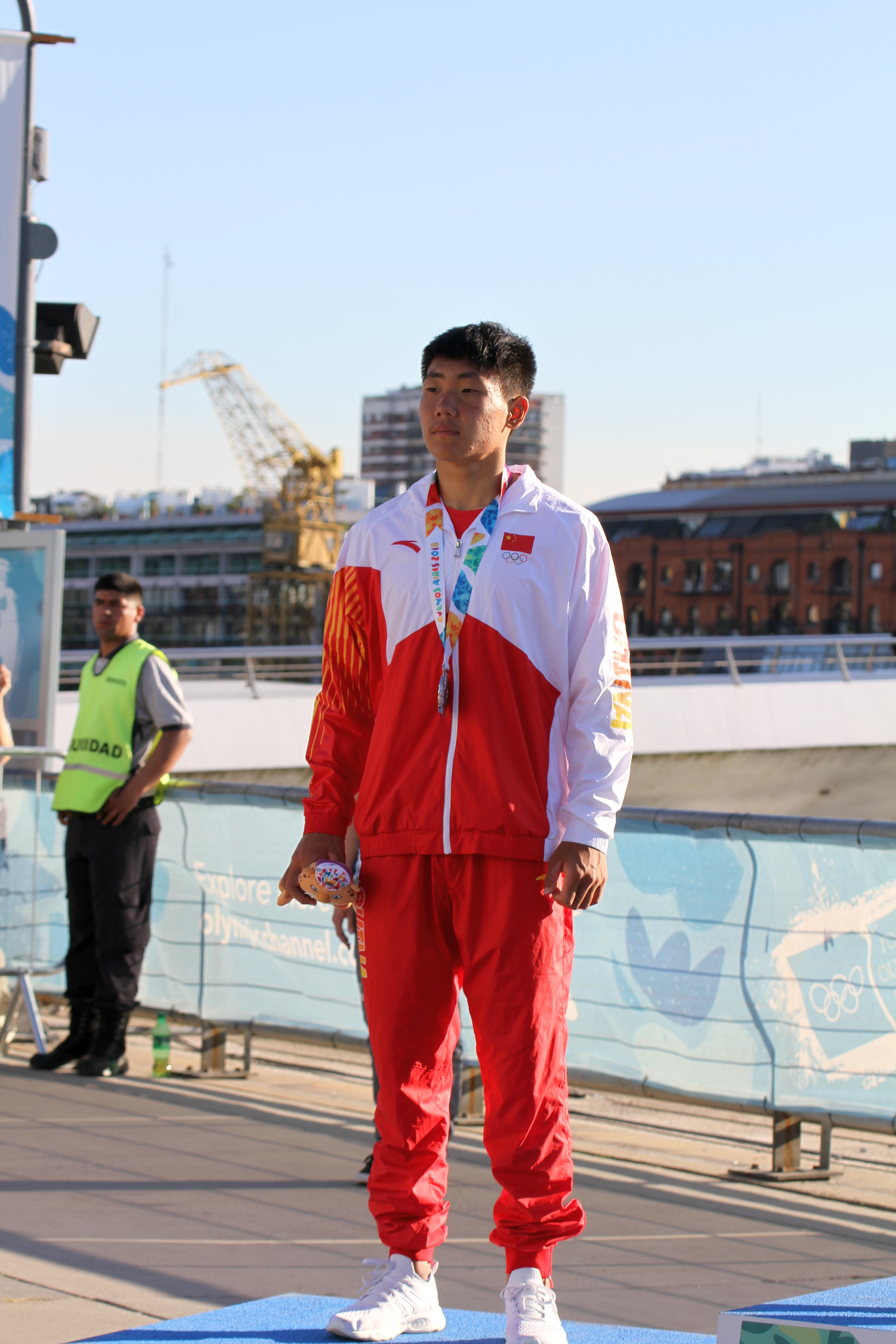
Guan Changheng at the Victory ceremony

- Boys' K1 – 1 boat

Boys

Athlete	Event	Qualification		Repechage		Quarterfinals	Semifinals	Final / BM	Rank
Athlete	Event	Time	Rank	Time	Rank	Opposition Result	Opposition Result	Opposition Result	Rank
Guan Changheng	K1 sprint	2:00.94	14 R	2:01.74	9	did not advance			
Guan Changheng	K1 slalom	1:10.62	1 Q	—N/a		Vangeel (BEL); W 1:10.74	Snook (NZL); W 1:11.15	Tominc (SLO); L 1:09.92	2nd place, silver medalist(s)

== Cycling ==
China qualified a girls' combined team based on its ranking in the Youth Olympic Games Junior Nation Rankings.

- Girls' combined team – 1 team of 2 athletes

Athlete	Event	Time trial			Road race			Cross-country Eliminator		Cross-country Short circuit		Criterium		Total points	Rank
Athlete	Event	Time	Rank	Points	Time	Rank	Points	Rank	Points	Rank	Points	Rank	Points	Total points	Rank
Wang Yawei	Girls' combined team	10:11.13	12	6	1:43:16	34	0	29	0	23	0	19	0	72	11
Tang Xin	Girls' combined team	10:11.13	12	6	DNF		0	23	0	23	0	3	65	72	11

== Dancesport ==
China qualified one dancer based on its performance at the 2018 World Youth Breaking Championship.

- B-Boys – X-Rain

Athlete	Event	Preliminary Round		Quarterfinals	Semifinals	Final	
Athlete	Event	Votes	Seed	Opposition Score	Opposition Score	Opposition Score	Rank
X-Rain	B-Boys'	11	8 Q	Shigekix (JPN); L 0–4	did not advance		
Srta. Carlota (FRA); X-Rain	Mixed team	13	7 Q	Lexy (ITA); Broly (ARG); L 0–4	did not advance		

== Diving ==
Athlete	Event	Preliminary		Final	
Athlete	Event	Points	Rank	Points	Rank
Lian Junjie	Boys' 3 m springboard	573.10	1	496.30	10
Lian Junjie	Boys' 10 m platform	595.10	1	600.05	2nd place, silver medalist(s)
Lin Shan	Girls' 3 m springboard	506.80	1	505.50	1st place, gold medalist(s)
Lin Shan	Girls' 10 m platform	485.50	1	466.50	1st place, gold medalist(s)
Lin Shan (CHN); Daniel Restrepo (COL)	Mixed team	—N/a		391.35	1st place, gold medalist(s)
Elena Wassen (GER); Lian Junjie (CHN)	Mixed team	—N/a		390.10	2nd place, silver medalist(s)

== Fencing ==
China qualified five athletes based on its performance at the 2018 Cadet World Championship.

- Boys' Épée – Li Zhiwel
- Boys' Foil – Xu Jie
- Boys' Sabre – Zhou Xuyi
- Girls' Foil – Fu Yingying
- Girls' Sabre – Lin Kesi

== Field Hockey ==
=== Girls' tournament ===
China qualified a girls' team (9 athletes) to the tournament.

Roster

- Wenquian Cai
- Ruirui Cao
- Yunxia Fan
- Yangyan Gu
- Ning Ma
- Anhui Yu
- Heyang Zhang
- Xinyi Zhu
- Meirong Zou

Preliminary round

Pos	Team	Pld	W	D	L	GF	GA	GD	Pts	Qualification
1	China	5	5	0	0	29	1	+28	15	Quarterfinals
2	Australia	5	2	1	2	23	8	+15	7	Quarterfinals
3	Poland	5	2	1	2	4	14	−10	7	Quarterfinals
4	Namibia	5	1	2	2	9	17	−8	5	Quarterfinals
5	Zimbabwe	5	1	1	3	6	23	−17	4	9th place game
6	Mexico	5	0	3	2	5	13	−8	3	11th place game

Source: FIH
Rules for classification: 1) Points; 2) Goal difference; 3) Goals scored; 4) Head-to-head result.

7 October 2018
16:15

China	8–0	Namibia
Zou 3', 20'; Ma 5', 6', 6', 19'; Yu 6'; Zhang 15'	Report

Umpires:
Lize Strydom (RSA)
Cynthia Clement (GHA)

8 October 2018
11:45

China	7–0	Mexico
Cai 3', 10', 15'; Yu 7'; Ma 16', 17'; Zhang 17'	Report

Umpires:
Lize Strydom (RSA)
Ayu Zainuddin (MAS)

9 October 2018
14:00

Zimbabwe	0–7	China
	Report	Cai 3', 10', 15'; Yu 7'; Ma 16', 17'; Zhang 17'

Umpires:
Lizé Strydom (RSA)
Ayu Zainuddin (MAS)

10 October 2018
10:15

China	3–1	Australia
Gu 4'; Zou 5', 14'	Report	Smith 7'

Umpires:
Lizé Strydom (RSA)
Sophie Bockelmann (GER)

11 October 2018
17:45

Poland	0–4	China
	Report	Ma 4', 11', 12', 19'

Umpires:
Lize Strydom (RSA)
Ayu Zainuddin (MAS)

Quarterfinals

12 October 2018
16:00

China	1–1	Austria
Zou 16'	Report	Buchta 5'
Penalties
Ma (penalty shoot-out missed); Gu (penalty shoot-out missed); Zou (penalty shoot-out scored); Zou (penalty shoot-out missed); Ma (penalty shoot-out scored)	2–1	(penalty shoot-out scored) Czech; (penalty shoot-out missed) Klausbruckner; (penalty shoot-out missed) Herzog; (penalty shoot-out missed) Czech; (penalty shoot-out missed) Klausbruckner

Umpires:
Rhiannon Murrie (AUS)
Gemma Calderon (ESP)

Semifinals

13 October 2018
16:00

India	3–0	China
Khan 1'; Reet 5'; Lalremsiami 20'	Report

Umpires:
Lizé Srtydom (RSA)
Victoria Pazos (PAR)

Bronze medal game

14 October 2018
14:00

South Africa	0–6	China
	Report	Gu 2'; Zou 7', 20'; Yu 13'; Ma 14'; Cai 15'

Umpires:
Victoria Pazos (PAR)
Fatma Mahmoud (EGY)

== Golf ==
Individual

Athlete	Event	Round 1		Round 2			Round 3			Total		
Athlete	Event	Score	Rank	Score	Total	Rank	Score	Total	Rank	Score	Par	Rank
Yang Jieming	Girls' individual	85 (+15)	31	74 (+4)	159	11	75 (+5)	234	16	234	+24	22
Xie Qiantong	Boys' individual	76 (+6)	22	74 (+4)	150	14	74 (+4)	224	15	224	+14	18

Team

Athletes	Event	Round 1 (Fourball)		Round 2 (Foursome)		Round 3 (Individual Stroke)				Total		
Athletes	Event	Score	Rank	Score	Rank	Girl	Boy	Total	Rank	Score	Par	Rank
Yang Jieming; Xie Qiantong	Mixed team	67 (-3)	22	73 (+3)	10	76	72	148 (+8)	16	288	+8	17

== Gymnastics ==
=== Acrobatic ===
China qualified a mixed pair based on its performance at the 2018 Acrobatic Gymnastics World Championship.

- ~~Mixed pair – 1 team of 2 athletes~~ (not used)

=== Artistic ===
China qualified two gymnasts based on its performance at the 2018 Asian Junior Championship.

- Boys' artistic individual all-around – 1 quota
- Girls' artistic individual all-around – 1 quota

Boys

Athlete	Event	Apparatus						Total	Rank
Athlete	Event	F	PH	R	V	PB	HB	Total	Rank
Yin Dehang	Qualification	13.233	13.866	13.500	14.133	13.566	12.533	80.831	3
Yin Dehang	All-around	11.900	14.066	13.366	13.600	13.766	12.466	79.164	7
Yin Dehang	Floor	13.233	—N/a					13.233	11
Yin Dehang	Pommel horse	—N/a	13.900	—N/a				13.900	1st place, gold medalist(s)
Yin Dehang	Parallel bars	—N/a				13.800	—N/a	13.800	2nd place, silver medalist(s)
Yin Dehang	Horizontal bar	—N/a					did not start		
Yin Dehang	Rings	—N/a		13.300	—N/a			13.300	3rd place, bronze medalist(s)

Girls

Athlete	Event	Apparatus				Total	Rank
Athlete	Event	V	UB	BB	F	Total	Rank
Tang Xijing	Qualification	13.375	13.333	13.800	12.766	53.274	3
Tang Xijing	All-around	13.466	13.966	11.766	13.066	52.264	4
Tang Xijing	Uneven bars	—N/a	13.900	—N/a		13.900	3rd place, bronze medalist(s)
Tang Xijing	Balance beam	—N/a		14.033	—N/a	14.033	1st place, gold medalist(s)
Tang Xijing	Floor	—N/a			12.966	12.966	4

=== Rhythmic ===
China qualified one gymnast based on its performance at the 2018 Asian Junior Championship.

- Girls' rhythmic individual all-around – 1 quota

Athlete	Event	Qualification						Final					
Athlete	Event	Hoop	Ball	Clubs	Ribbon	Total	Rank	Hoop	Ball	Clubs	Ribbon	Total	Rank
Wang Zilu	All-around	12.900	15.050	14.500	13.050	55.500	16	did not advance					

=== Trampoline ===
China qualified two gymnasts based on its performance at the 2018 Asian Junior Championship.

- Boys' trampoline – 1 quota
- Girls' trampoline – 1 quota

Athlete	Event	Qualification				Final	
Athlete	Event	Routine 1	Routine 2	Total	Rank	Score	Rank
Fu Fantao	Boys	45.490	6	102.910	2	58.030	1st place, gold medalist(s)
Fan Xinyi	Girls	44.335	54.765	99.100	1	52.560	1st place, gold medalist(s)

=== Multidiscipline ===
Team	Athlete	Acrobatic	Artistic	Rhythmic	Trampoline	Total points	Rank
Team Simone Biles (orange)	Mariela Kostadinova (BUL); Panayot Dimitrov (BUL)	10	—N/a			293	1st place, gold medalist(s)
Team Simone Biles (orange)	Ruan Lange (RSA)	—N/a	17	—N/a		293	1st place, gold medalist(s)
Team Simone Biles (orange)	Krisztián Balázs (HUN)	—N/a	34	—N/a		293	1st place, gold medalist(s)
Team Simone Biles (orange)	Nazar Chepurnyi (UKR)	—N/a	70	—N/a		293	1st place, gold medalist(s)
Team Simone Biles (orange)	Tamara Ong (SGP)	—N/a	38	—N/a		293	1st place, gold medalist(s)
Team Simone Biles (orange)	Phạm Như Phương (VIE)	—N/a	48	—N/a		293	1st place, gold medalist(s)
Team Simone Biles (orange)	Alba Petisco (ESP)	—N/a	40	—N/a		293	1st place, gold medalist(s)
Team Simone Biles (orange)	Talisa Torretti (ITA)	—N/a		13	—N/a	293	1st place, gold medalist(s)
Team Simone Biles (orange)	Daria Trubnikova (RUS)	—N/a		4	—N/a	293	1st place, gold medalist(s)
Team Simone Biles (orange)	Yelyzaveta Luzan (AZE)	—N/a		–	—N/a	293	1st place, gold medalist(s)
Team Simone Biles (orange)	Liam Christie (AUS)	—N/a			17	293	1st place, gold medalist(s)
Team Simone Biles (orange)	Fan Xiny (CHN)	—N/a			2	293	1st place, gold medalist(s)
Team Dong Dong (purple)	Rachel Nell (RSA); Sidwell Madibeng (RSA)	33	—N/a			389	5
Team Dong Dong (purple)	Daniel Schwed (GER)	—N/a	63	—N/a		389	5
Team Dong Dong (purple)	Marcus Stenberg (SWE)	—N/a	27	—N/a		389	5
Team Dong Dong (purple)	Diogo Brajão Soares (BRA)	—N/a	34	—N/a		389	5
Team Dong Dong (purple)	Beatriz Cardoso (POR)	—N/a	33	—N/a		389	5
Team Dong Dong (purple)	Ana-Maria Puiu (ROU)	—N/a	42	—N/a		389	5
Team Dong Dong (purple)	Yunseo Lee (KOR)	—N/a	46	—N/a		389	5
Team Dong Dong (purple)	Aurora Arvelo (FIN)	—N/a		38	—N/a	389	5
Team Dong Dong (purple)	Khrystyna Pohranychna (UKR)	—N/a		22	—N/a	389	5
Team Dong Dong (purple)	Zilu Wang (CHN)	—N/a		12	—N/a	389	5
Team Dong Dong (purple)	Nikita Babyonishev (UZB)	—N/a			16	389	5
Team Dong Dong (purple)	Yekaterina Lukina (KAZ)	—N/a			23	389	5
Team Yang Wei (red)	Liu Yiqian (CHN); Li Zhengyang (CHN)	27	—N/a			403	7
Team Yang Wei (red)	Felix Dolci (CAN)	—N/a	54	—N/a		403	7
Team Yang Wei (red)	Martin Guðmundsson (ISL)	—N/a	23	—N/a		403	7
Team Yang Wei (red)	Bora Tarhan (TUR)	—N/a	63	—N/a		403	7
Team Yang Wei (red)	Kryxia Alicea (PUR)	—N/a	–	—N/a		403	7
Team Yang Wei (red)	Aliaksandra Varabyova (BLR)	—N/a	67	—N/a		403	7
Team Yang Wei (red)	Anastasiia Bachynska (UKR)	—N/a	8	—N/a		403	7
Team Yang Wei (red)	Maria Arakaki (BRA)	—N/a		18	—N/a	403	7
Team Yang Wei (red)	Paula Serrano (ESP)	—N/a		55	—N/a	403	7
Team Yang Wei (red)	Xitlali Santana (MEX)	—N/a		66	—N/a	403	7
Team Yang Wei (red)	Andrew Stamp (GBR)	—N/a			12	403	7
Team Yang Wei (red)	Jessica Pickering (AUS)	—N/a			10	403	7
Team Kohei Uchimura (blue)	Daryna Plokhotniuk (UKR); Oleksandr Madei (UKR)	10	—N/a			407	8
Team Kohei Uchimura (blue)	Abdulaziz Mirvaliev (UZB)	—N/a	115	—N/a		407	8
Team Kohei Uchimura (blue)	Michael Torres (PUR)	—N/a	117	—N/a		407	8
Team Kohei Uchimura (blue)	Ondřej Kalný (CZE)	—N/a	–	—N/a		407	8
Team Kohei Uchimura (blue)	Amelie Morgan (GBR)	—N/a	20	—N/a		407	8
Team Kohei Uchimura (blue)	Tang Xijing (CHN)	—N/a	9	—N/a		407	8
Team Kohei Uchimura (blue)	Csenge Bácskay (HUN)	—N/a	5	—N/a		407	8
Team Kohei Uchimura (blue)	Josephine Juul Møller (NOR)	—N/a		34	—N/a	407	8
Team Kohei Uchimura (blue)	Denisa Stoian (ROU)	—N/a		47	—N/a	407	8
Team Kohei Uchimura (blue)	Anna Kamenshchikova (BLR)	—N/a		22	—N/a	407	8
Team Kohei Uchimura (blue)	Noureddine-Younes Belkhir (ALG)	—N/a			21	407	8
Team Kohei Uchimura (blue)	Emily Mussmann (SUI)	—N/a			7	407	8
Yevgeny Marchenko (brown)	Daniela González (PUR); Adriel González (PUR)	36	—N/a			430	10
Yevgeny Marchenko (brown)	Byun Seong-won (KOR)	—N/a	45	—N/a		430	10
Yevgeny Marchenko (brown)	Lay Giannini (ITA)	—N/a	55	—N/a		430	10
Yevgeny Marchenko (brown)	Víctor Betancourt (VEN)	—N/a	54	—N/a		430	10
Yevgeny Marchenko (brown)	Kate Sayer (AUS)	—N/a	36	—N/a		430	10
Yevgeny Marchenko (brown)	Elvira Katsali (GRE)	—N/a	89	—N/a		430	10
Yevgeny Marchenko (brown)	Valeriia Sotskova (ISR)	—N/a		26	—N/a	430	10
Yevgeny Marchenko (brown)	Anastasia Pingou (CYP)	—N/a		20	—N/a	430	10
Yevgeny Marchenko (brown)	Ekaterina Fetisova (UZB)	—N/a		39	—N/a	430	10
Yevgeny Marchenko (brown)	Fu Fantao (CHN)	—N/a			8	430	10
Yevgeny Marchenko (brown)	Alyssa Oh (USA)	—N/a			12	430	10

== Modern pentathlon ==
China qualified two pentathletes based on its performance at the Asian/Oceanian Youth Olympic Games Qualifier. China also qualified another female pentathlete based on its performance at the 2018 Youth A World Championship. They must decide which quota they will use.

- Boys' individual – Zhao Zhonghao
- Girls' individual – Yuan Xin or Gu Yewen

Athlete	Event	Fencing Ranking round (épée one touch)			Swimming (200 m freestyle)			Fencing Bonus round (épée one touch)		Combined: Shooting / Running (10 m air pistol) / (3200 m)			Total points	Final rank
Athlete	Event	Results	Rank	Points	Time	Rank	Points	Results	Points	Time	Rank	Points	Total points	Final rank
Zhao Zhonghao	Boys' individual	13-10	7	226	2:13.29	18	284	0-1	0	11:25.73	4	615	1125	7
Gu Yewen	Girls' individual	13-10	8	226	2:21.7	10	267	1-1	1	12:38.53	5	542	1036	4
Ahmed Elgendy (EGY); Yewen Gu (CHN)	Mixed relay	19-3; 14-8	1	260	2:01.72	5	307	2–0	2	11:41.43	6	599	1168	1st place, gold medalist(s)
Annabel Denton (GBR); Zhao Zhonghao (CHN)	Mixed relay	10-13; 12-9	9	210	2:03.65	11	303	2–0	3	11:38.26	3	602	1118	5

== Roller speed skating ==
China qualified one roller skater based on its performance at the 2018 Roller Speed Skating World Championship.

- Boys' combined speed event – Chen Tao

== Rowing ==
China qualified one boat based on its performance at the Asian Qualification Regatta and another boat based on its performance at the 2017 World Championships.

- Boys' single sculls – 1 athlete
- Girls' pair – 2 athletes

== Sailing ==
China qualified two boats based on its performance at the 2018 Singapore Open (Asian Techno 293+ Qualifiers). China later qualified two IKA Twin Tip boats based on its performance at the 2018 IKA Twin Tip Racing Youth World Championship.

- Boys' Techno 293+ – 1 boat
- Boys' IKA Twin Tip Racing – 1 boat
- Girls' Techno 293+ – 1 boat
- Girls' IKA Twin Tip Racing – 1 boat

== Shooting ==
China qualified three sport shooters based on its performance at the 2017 Asian Championships.

Individual

Athlete	Event	Qualification		Final	
Athlete	Event	Points	Rank	Points	Rank
Zhang Changhong	Boys' 10 metre air rifle	624.4	2 Q	205.6	4
Wang Zeru	Girls' 10 metre air rifle	626.4	2 Q	185.8	5
Lu Kaiman	Girls' 10 metre air pistol	569-12x	3 Q	153.0	6

Team

Athletes	Event	Qualification		Round of 16	Quarterfinals	Semifinals	Final / BM	Rank
Athletes	Event	Points	Rank	Opposition Result	Opposition Result	Opposition Result	Opposition Result	Rank
Zhang Changhong (CHN); Amira Hamid (BAN)	Mixed 10 metre air rifle	815.3	16Q	Erdenechuluun (MGL); Pekler (HUN); L 7–10	did not advance			16
Wang Zeru (CHN); Plamen Emilov (BUL)	Mixed 10 metre air rifle	819.8	13Q	Kemppi (FIN); Firmapaz (ARG); L 9–10	did not advance			14
Lu Kaiman (CHN); Jerguš Vengríni (SVK)	Mixed 10 metre air pistol	739-15x	13Q	Rankelytė (LTU); Ușanlî (MDA); L 7–10	did not advance			14

== Sport climbing ==
China qualified three sport climbers based on its performance at the 2017 World Youth Sport Climbing Championships.

- Boys' combined – 2 quotas (Pan Yu Fei, Huang Di Chong)
- ~~Girls' combined – 1 quota (Song Yi Ling)~~

However, Song was not included on the final start list for the Youth Olympics.

== Swimming ==
Boys

Athlete	Event	Heats		Semifinals		Final	
Athlete	Event	Time	Rank	Time	Rank	Time	Rank
Hong Jinquan	100 metre freestyle	50.81	9	50.71	9	50.35	7
Hong Jinquan	200 metre freestyle	1:51.22	12	did not advance			
Hong Jinquan	400 metre freestyle	3:58.93	23	did not advance			
Wang Guanbin	50 metre backstroke	25.93	2	26.05	5	25.83	4
Wang Guanbin	100 metre backstroke	56.01	5	55.77	5	55.33	4
Wang Guanbin	200 metre backstroke	2:04.18	12	did not advance			
Sun Jiajun	50 metre breaststroke	27.91	1	28.05	2	27.85	2nd place, silver medalist(s)
Sun Jiajun	100 metre breaststroke	1:01.43	2	1:00.61	2	1:00.59	1st place, gold medalist(s)
Sun Jiajun	200 metre breaststroke	2:16.77	10	did not advance			
Shen Jiahao	50 metre butterfly	24.15	4	24.29	7	23.83	5
Shen Jiahao	100 metre butterfly	53.43	6	53.52	10	did not advance	
Shen Jiahao	200 metre butterfly	2:01.81	11	did not advance			
Wang Guanbin; Shen Jiahao; Sun Jiajun; Hong Jinquan	4 × 100 metre freestyle relay	—N/a				3:24.03	4
Wang Guanbin; Sun Jiajun; Shen Jiahao; Hong Jinquan	4 × 100 metre medley relay	3:45.74	5	—N/a		3:38.65	2nd place, silver medalist(s)

Girls

Athlete	Event	Heats		Semifinals		Final	
Athlete	Event	Time	Rank	Time	Rank	Time	Rank
Yang Junxuan	50 metre freestyle	25.65	2	25.43	2	25.47	3rd place, bronze medalist(s)
Yang Junxuan	100 metre freestyle	56.50	9	54.79	2	54.43	2nd place, silver medalist(s)
Yang Junxuan	200 metre freestyle	2:00.43	3	—N/a		1:58.05	2nd place, silver medalist(s)
Peng Xuwei	50 metre backstroke	29.32	8	29.49	12	did not advance	
Peng Xuwei	100 metre backstroke	1:01.78	4	1:02.12	7	1:01.44	6
Peng Xuwei	200 metre backstroke	2:13.06	3	—N/a		2:11.77	5
Zheng Muyan	50 metre breaststroke	33.23	22	did not advance			
Zheng Muyan	100 metre breaststroke	1:10.94	14	1:10.78	15	did not advance	
Zheng Muyan	200 metre breaststroke	2:29.61	2	—N/a		2:28.99	4
Lin Xintong	50 metre butterfly	26.84	2	26.83	4	27.10	6
Lin Xintong	100 metre butterfly	1:01.19	6	1:00.21	4	1:00.35	4
Lin Xintong	200 metre butterfly	2:20.98	12	did not advance			
Yang Junxuan; Peng Xuwei; Zheng Muyan; Lin Xintong	4 × 100 metre freestyle relay	—N/a				3:53.19	4
Peng Xuwei; Zheng Muyan; Lin Xintong; Yang Junxuan	4 × 100 metre medley relay	—N/a				4:05.18	1st place, gold medalist(s)

Mixed

Athlete	Event	Heats		Final	
Athlete	Event	Time	Rank	Time	Rank
Shen Jiahao; Hong Jinquan; Lin Xintong; Yang Junxuan	4 × 100 metre freestyle relay	3:33.76	3	3:30.45	3rd place, bronze medalist(s)
Peng Xuwei; Sun Jiajun; Hong Jinquan; Yang Junxuan	4 × 100 metre medley relay	3:53.10	1	3:49.79	1st place, gold medalist(s)

== Table tennis ==
China qualified two athletes based on its performance at the Asian Qualification Event.

- Boys' singles – Wang Chuqin
- Girls' singles – Sun Yingsha

Athlete	Event	Group stage		Round of 16	Quarterfinals	Semifinals	Final / BM	
Athlete	Event	Opposition Score	Rank	Opposition Score	Opposition Score	Opposition Score	Opposition Score	Rank
Wang Chuqin	Boys' singles	Ursu (MDA); W 4–0; Rembert (FRA); W 4–1; Hamdoun (TUN); W 4–0	1	Sidorenko (RUS); W 4–2	Moregard (SWE); W 4–1	Kanak; United States; W 4–0	Harimoto; Japan; W 4–1	1st place, gold medalist(s)
Sun Yingsha	Girls' singles	Blaskova (CZE); W 4–0; Gauthier (FRA); W 4–1; Morri (SMR); W 4–0	1	Pyon (PRK); W 4–0	Takahashi (BRA); W 4–0	Kamath (IND); W 4–1	Hirano; Japan; W 4–1	1st place, gold medalist(s)
Wang Chuqin; Sun Yingsha	Mixed team	Germany; W 3–0; Italy; W 3–0; Nigeria; W 3–0	1	Brazil; W 2–0	Russia; W 2–0	Chinese Taipei; W 2–0	Japan; W 2–1	1st place, gold medalist(s)

== Taekwondo ==
Athlete	Event	Round of 16	Quarterfinals	Semifinals	Final	
Athlete	Event	Opposition Result	Opposition Result	Opposition Result	Opposition Result	Rank
Cao Zihan	Girls' 49 kg	Bye	Avishag Semberg (ISR); W 15–1	Elizaveta Ryadninskaya (RUS); L 5–6	did not advance	3rd place, bronze medalist(s)
Yang Junli	Girls' 55 kg	Bye	Kanthida Saengsin (THA); L 2–3	did not advance		
Mu Wenzhe	Girls' +63 kg	—N/a	Laura Ayala (COL); W 28–17	Fatima-Ezzahra Aboufaras (MAR); L 2–17	did not advance	3rd place, bronze medalist(s)

== Tennis ==
Singles

Athlete	Event	Round of 32	Round of 16	Quarterfinals	Semifinals	Final / BM	
Athlete	Event	Opposition Score	Opposition Score	Opposition Score	Opposition Score	Opposition Score	Rank
Mu Tao	Boys' singles	Hijikata (AUS); W (7^{7}-6^{2}, 2-6, 6-0)	Tseng (TPE); L (3-6, 6-3, 2-6)	did not advance			9
Wang Xinyu	Girls' singles	Kanapatskaya (BLR); W (6-3, 7-6^{5})	Zünd (LIE); W (6-4, 6-0)	Vismane (LAT); W WO	Juvan (SLO); L (0-6, 7-5)	Osorio (COL); L (6^{4}-7, 0-6)	4
Wang Xiyu	Girls' singles	Naito (JPN); L (6^{3}-7, 5-7)	did not advance				17

Doubles

Athletes	Event	Round of 32	Round of 16	Quarterfinals	Semifinals	Final / BM	
Athletes	Event	Opposition Score	Opposition Score	Opposition Score	Opposition Score	Opposition Score	Rank
Mu Tao; Naoki Tajima (JPN)	Boys' doubles	—N/a	Jianu (ROU) / Michalski (POL); W (6^{5}-7, 6-3, [10-4])	Báez (ARG) / Díaz Acosta (ARG); L (0-6, 1-6)	did not advance		5
Wang Xinyu; Wang Xiyu	Girls' doubles	—N/a	Kanapatskaya (BLR) / Vismane (LAT); W (6-0, 6-4)	Cadar (ROU) / Sun (SUI); W (6-1, 4-6, [10-3])	Naito (JPN) / Sato (JPN); L (6-4, 4-6, [6-10])	Carlé (ARG) / Osorio (COL); W (7-5, 6-3)	3rd place, bronze medalist(s)
Wang Xinyu; Mu Tao	Mixed doubles	Cadar (ROU) / Jianu (ROU); W (6-1, 7-5)	Sun (SUI) / Wenger (SUI); L (4-6, 6-3, [6-10])	did not advance			9
Wang Xiyu; Dostanbek Tashbulatov (KAZ)	Mixed doubles	Parry (FRA) / Tabur (FRA); W (7-5, 6-2)	Osorio (COL) / Mejía (COL); L (6-4, 4-6, [8-10])	did not advance			9

== Triathlon ==
China qualified two athletes based on its performance at the 2018 Asian Youth Olympic Games Qualifier.

- ~~Boys' individual – 1 quota~~ (not used)
- Girls' individual – 1 quota

Individual

Athlete	Event	Swim (750m)	Trans 1	Bike (20 km)	Trans 2	Run (5 km)	Total Time	Rank
Yu Xinying	Girls	10:43	0:35	31:24	0:36	19:31	1:02:49	20

Relay

Athlete	Event	Total Times per Athlete (Swim 250m, Bike 6.6 km, Run 1.8 km)	Total Group Time	Rank
Asia 2 Maki Uchida (JPN); Hung Tik Long (HKG); Yu Xinying (CHN); Chong Xian Hao (MAS)	Mixed Relay	23:40 (13); 24:22 (14); 25:21 (11); 23:26 (11)	1:36:49 1P	13

== Weightlifting ==
China qualified four athletes based on its performance at the 2017 World Youth Championships.

- ~~Boys' events – 2 quotas~~ (not used)
- ~~Girls' events – 2 quotas~~ (not used)

== Wrestling ==
Key:
- VFA – Victory by Fall
- VSU – Without any points scored by the opponent
- VSU1 – With point(s) scored by the opponent
- VPO – Without any points scored by the opponent
- VPO1 – With point(s) scored by the opponent

Athlete	Event	Group stage					Final / RM	Rank
Athlete	Event	Opposition Score	Opposition Score	Opposition Score	Opposition Score	Rank	Opposition Score	Rank
Zhou Xinru	Girls' freestyle −65kg	Tamir (MGL); W 11 – 1 ^{VSU1}	Escamilla Menchaca (MEX); W 3 – 0 ^{VPO}	Capezan (ROU); W 9 – 2 ^{VPO1}	Ramírez Marquez (CUB); W 10 – 0 ^{VSU}	1 Q	Chudyk (UKR); W 10 – 0 ^{VSU}	1st place, gold medalist(s)
