= Swimming at the 2018 Summer Youth Olympics – Boys' 50 metre butterfly =

Boys' 50 metre butterfly at the 2018 Summer Youth Olympics
- Venue: Natatorium
- Dates: 10 October (heats, semifinals); 11 October (final)
- Competitors: 50 from 45 nations
- Winning time: 23.62

Medalists
gold medal	Andrei Minakov	Russia
silver medal	Tomoe Zenimoto Hvas	Norway
silver medal	Daniil Markov	Russia

The boys' 50 metre butterfly event at the 2018 Summer Youth Olympics took place on 10 and 11 October at the Natatorium in Buenos Aires, Argentina.

== Results ==
=== Heats ===
The heats were started on 10 October at 10:00.

Rank	Heat	Lane	Name	Nationality	Time	Notes
1	7	4	Andrei Minakov	Russia	23.50	Q
2	7	5	Kristóf Milák	Hungary	23.99	Q
3	6	5	Daniil Markov	Russia	24.00	Q
4	6	6	Shen Jiahao	China	24.15	Q
5	6	2	Thomas Ceccon	Italy	24.20	Q
5	6	4	Tomoe Zenimoto Hvas	Norway	24.20	Q
7	7	3	Noè Ponti	Switzerland	24.21	Q
8	5	5	Luca Nik Armbruster	Germany	24.30	Q
9	5	3	Federico Burdisso	Italy	24.39	Q
10	3	2	Artur Barseghyan	Armenia	24.42	Q,NR
11	5	2	Abeiku Jackson	Ghana	24.44	Q
12	5	4	Abdelrahman Sameh	Egypt	24.45	Q
13	5	1	Ihor Troianovskyi	Ukraine	24.53	Q
13	7	2	Sergueï Comte	France	24.53	Q
15	4	1	Robin Hanson	Sweden	24.63	Q
16	6	6	Shinnosuke Ishikawa	Japan	24.64	Q
17	3	3	Nicholas Lim	Hong Kong	24.74	
18	4	5	George Rațiu	Romania	24.75	
19	4	6	Jakub Majerski	Poland	24.79	
20	7	1	Denys Kesil	Ukraine	24.97	
20	7	7	Ivan Shamshurin	Belarus	24.97	
22	5	6	Gal Kordež	Slovenia	24.99	
23	7	6	Jean-Marc Delices	France	25.04	
24	4	2	Maurice Ingenrieth	Germany	25.08	
25	2	7	Akalanka Peiris	Sri Lanka	25.18	
26	3	4	Gal Cohen Groumi	Israel	25.20	
26	4	4	Kael Yorke	Trinidad and Tobago	25.20	
28	7	8	Guillermo Cruz	Mexico	25.24	
29	4	3	Yousif Buarissh	Saudi Arabia	25.27	
30	5	7	Tihomir Todorov	Bulgaria	25.33	
31	6	7	Dominik Karačić	Croatia	25.35	
32	6	1	Fatih Tahirović	Bosnia and Herzegovina	25.36	
33	3	3	Benjamin Schnapp	Chile	25.42	
34	3	5	Hendrik Duvenhage	South Africa	25.54	
35	6	8	Jake Johnson	United States	25.63	
36	4	8	Alex Ahtiainen	Estonia	25.66	
37	5	8	Ong Jung Yi	Singapore	25.67	
38	2	2	Jayhan Odlum-Smith	Saint Lucia	25.74	
39	3	7	Kirill Shatskov	Kazakhstan	25.86	
40	2	4	Joseph Jackson	Australia	25.89	
41	3	1	Lleyton Martin	Antigua and Barbuda	25.93	
42	2	3	Rudi Spiteri	Malta	26.13	
43	2	5	Low Zheng Yong	Malaysia	26.24	
44	2	6	Yael Touw Ngie Tjouw	Suriname	26.27	
45	3	8	Matej Duša	Slovakia	26.35	
45	4	7	Robbie Powell	Ireland	26.35	
47	1	5	Ousmane Touré	Mali	28.32	
48	1	3	Andrew Qumsieh	Palestine	29.53	
49	1	4	Ismat Moani	Sudan	30.24	
50	2	1	Bunna Poeuvpichra	Cambodia	30.93	

=== Semifinals ===
The semifinals were started on 10 October at 19:00.

Rank	Heat	Lane	Name	Nationality	Time	Notes
1	2	3	Thomas Ceccon	Italy	23.46	Q
2	2	4	Andrei Minakov	Russia	23.47	Q
3	2	5	Daniil Markov	Russia	23.77	Q
4	1	4	Kristóf Milák	Hungary	23.84	Q
5	1	3	Tomoe Zenimoto Hvas	Norway	24.07	Q
6	1	7	Abdelrahman Sameh	Egypt	24.15	Q
7	1	5	Shen Jiahao	China	24.29	Q
7	2	2	Federico Burdisso	Italy	24.29	Q
9	2	6	Noè Ponti	Switzerland	24.31	
10	2	1	Ihor Troianovskyi	Ukraine	24.33	
11	1	1	Sergueï Comte	France	24.38	
12	1	2	Artur Barseghyan	Armenia	24.44	
13	1	6	Luca Nik Armbruster	Germany	24.45	
14	1	8	Shinnosuke Ishikawa	Japan	24.76	
15	2	7	Abeiku Jackson	Ghana	24.90	
16	2	8	Robin Hanson	Sweden	25.35	

=== Final ===
The final was held on 11 October at 18:48.

Rank	Lane	Name	Nationality	Time	Notes
1st place, gold medalist(s)	5	Andrei Minakov	Russia	23.62	
2nd place, silver medalist(s)	2	Tomoe Zenimoto Hvas	Norway	23.63	
2nd place, silver medalist(s)	3	Daniil Markov	Russia	23.63	
4	4	Thomas Ceccon	Italy	23.65	
5	1	Shen Jiahao	China	23.83	
6	7	Abdelrahman Sameh	Egypt	24.07	
7	6	Kristóf Milák	Hungary	24.11	
8	8	Federico Burdisso	Italy	24.25	
