= Diving at the 2018 Summer Youth Olympics =

Diving at the III Summer Youth Olympic Games
- Venue: Natatorium
- Dates: 13–17 October
- No. of events: 5 (2 boys, 2 girls, 1 mixed)
- Competitors: 35 from 23 nations

Diving at the 2018 Summer Youth Olympics was held from 13 to 17 October at the Natatorium in Buenos Aires, Argentina.

== Qualification ==
Each National Olympic Committee (NOC) can enter 2 athletes, 1 in each gender. As hosts, Argentina is given four quotas, 1 for each event. 8 athletes, 2 in each event will be decided by the Tripartite Commission. The remaining 36 places shall be decided at the World Junior Diving Championship.

To be eligible to participate at the Youth Olympics athletes must have been born between 1 January 2000 and 31 December 2002.

=== 3m Springboard ===
Event	Location	Date	Total Places	Qualified Boys	Qualified Girls
Host Nation	-	-	~~1~~ 0	~~Argentina~~	~~Argentina~~
2018 World Junior Diving Championship	(Ukraine) Kyiv	23–29 July 2018	9	Colombia; China; Great Britain; Australia; Canada; Germany; Spain; Mexico; Netherlands	China; Australia; Russia; Great Britain; United States; Mexico; Germany; Italy; Switzerland
Reallocation	-	-	~~2~~	France; Russia; Italy; Romania; United States	Malaysia; Norway; Brazil; Canada; Spain; Ukraine
TOTAL				~~12~~ 14	~~12~~ 15

=== 10m Platform ===
Event	Location	Date	Total Places	Qualified Boys	Qualified Girls
Host Nation	-	-	~~1~~ 0	~~Argentina~~	~~Argentina~~
2018 World Junior Diving Championship	(Ukraine) Kyiv	23–29 July 2018	9	China; Russia; Germany; ~~Japan~~; Malaysia; Ukraine; ~~Great Britain~~; United States; Canada; Greece	China; ~~Russia~~; Germany; ~~Australia~~; Mexico; Ukraine; ~~Italy~~; ~~United States~~; Canada; Ireland
Reallocation	-	-	~~2~~	Colombia; Romania; Italy; Mexico	Finland; Norway; Kazakhstan; Brazil; Malaysia
TOTAL				12	~~12~~ 11

=== Summary ===
NOC	Boys		Girls		Total	
NOC	3m springboard	10m platform	3m springboard	10m platform	Quotas	Athletes
Australia	X		X		2	2
Brazil			X	X	2	1
Canada	X	X	X	X	4	2
China	X	X	X	X	4	2
Colombia	X	X			2	1
Finland				X	1	1
France	X				1	1
Germany	X	X	X	X	4	2
Great Britain	X		X		2	2
Greece		X			1	1
Ireland				X	1	1
Italy	X	X	X		3	2
Kazakhstan				X	1	1
Malaysia		X	X	X	3	2
Mexico	X	X	X	X	4	2
Netherlands	X				1	1
Norway			X	X	2	1
Romania	X	X			2	1
Russia	X	X	X		3	2
Spain	X		X		2	2
Switzerland			X		1	1
Ukraine		X	X	X	3	2
United States	X	X	X		3	2
23 NOCs	14	12	15	11	52	35

== Medal summary ==
=== Medal table ===
Rank	Nation	Gold	Silver	Bronze	Total
1	China	2	1	0	3
–	Mixed-NOCs	1	1	1	3
2	Mexico	1	0	1	2
3	Colombia	1	0	0	1
4	Russia	0	1	2	3
5	Great Britain	0	1	0	1
5	Ukraine	0	1	0	1
7	United States	0	0	1	1
Totals (7 entries)		5	5	5	15

=== Events ===
Games	Gold	Silver	Bronze
Boys' 3m springboard	Daniel Restrepo; Colombia	Anthony Harding; Great Britain	Ruslan Ternovoi; Russia
Boys' 10m platform	Randal Willars; Mexico	Lian Junjie; China	Ruslan Ternovoi; Russia
Girls' 3m springboard	Lin Shan; China	Uliana Kliueva; Russia	Bridget O'Neil; United States
Girls' 10m platform	Lin Shan; China	Sofiya Lyskun; Ukraine	Gabriela Agundes; Mexico
Mixed team	Lin Shan; China; Daniel Restrepo; Colombia	Elena Wassen; Germany; Lian Junjie; China	Sofiya Lyskun; Ukraine; Ruslan Ternovoi; Russia
