= Modern pentathlon at the 2018 Summer Youth Olympics – Mixed relay =

Mixed relay at the III Summer Youth Olympic Games
- Venue: Parque Polideportivo Roca
- Dates: 15–16 October
- Competitors: 46

Medalists
| 1st place, gold medalist(s) | | Gu Yewen; Ahmed Elgendy | Mixed-NOCs |
| 2nd place, silver medalist(s) | | Salma Abdelmaksoud; Franco Serrano | Mixed-NOCs |
| 3rd place, bronze medalist(s) | | Laura Heredia; Kamil Kasperczak | Mixed-NOCs |

These are the results for the mixed relay event at the 2018 Summer Youth Olympics.

== Results ==
| Rank | Team | Athletes | Fencing Ranking Round | Swimming | Fencing Bonus Round | Laser-Run | Total |
|---|---|---|---|---|---|---|---|
| 1st place, gold medalist(s) | Team 1 | Gu Yewen (CHN); Ahmed Elgendy (EGY) | 260 | 307 | 2 | 599 | 1168 |
| 2nd place, silver medalist(s) | Team 3 | Salma Abdelmaksoud (EGY); Franco Serrano (ARG) | 245 | 310 | 2 | 599 | 1156 |
| 3rd place, bronze medalist(s) | Team 4 | Laura Heredia (ESP); Kamil Kasperczak (POL) | 250 | 302 | 0 | 596 | 1148 |
| 4 | Team 2 | Emma Riff (FRA); Giorgio Malan (ITA) | 200 | 316 | 1 | 606 | 1123 |
| 5 | Team 5 | Annabel Denton (GBR); Zhao Zhonghao (CHN) | 210 | 303 | 3 | 602 | 1118 |
| 6 | Team 15 | Katsiaryna Etsina (BLR); Adil Ibragimov (KAZ) | 200 | 301 | 1 | 613 | 1115 |
| 7 | Team 12 | Anna Jurt (SUI); Toby Price (GBR) | 220 | 288 | 1 | 601 | 1110 |
| 8 | Team 6 | Alice Rinaudo (ITA); Aivaras Kazlas (LTU) | 240 | 305 | 1 | 557 | 1103 |
| 9 | Team 13 | Martina Armanazqui (ARG); Alex Vasilianov (MDA) | 205 | 305 | 2 | 588 | 1100 |
| 10 | Team 9 | Maria Ieda Chaves Guimarães (BRA); Uladzislau Astrouski (BLR) | 205 | 297 | 0 | 586 | 1088 |
| 11 | Team 20 | Zornitsa Stoilova (BUL); Csaba Bohm (HUN) | 185 | 306 | 0 | 595 | 1086 |
| 12 | Team 7 | Michelle Gulyás (HUN); Gaga Khijakadze (GEO) | 175 | 309 | 0 | 596 | 1080 |
| 13 | Team 19 | Alida Frances van der Merwe (RSA); Aidar Kenzhebaev (KGZ) | 195 | 307 | 0 | 576 | 1078 |
| 14 | Team 24 | Ana Rocio Aragón Ortiz (GUA); Keaan Van Venrooij (AUS) | 195 | 309 | 0 | 565 | 1069 |
| 15 | Team 10 | Melissa Mireles (MEX); Dora Nusretoglu (TUR) | 195 | 292 | 0 | 582 | 1069 |
| 16 | Team 22 | Elžbieta Adomaitytė (LTU); Ángel Hernández (VEN) | 210 | 284 | 0 | 569 | 1063 |
| 17 | Team 21 | Ekaterina Tareva (KGZ); Hristo Panayotov (BUL) | 185 | 305 | 0 | 567 | 1057 |
| 18 | Team 17 | Hinano Shigehara (JPN); Ugo Fleurot (FRA) | 210 | 302 | 0 | 542 | 1054 |
| 19 | Team 18 | Nikita Mawhirt (AUS); Eduardo Oliveira (POR) | 175 | 299 | 0 | 569 | 1043 |
| 20 | Team 23 | Yaren Nur Polat (TUR); Rhys Domonic Poovan (RSA) | 180 | 303 | 0 | 556 | 1039 |
| 21 | Team 11 | Viktoriia Novikova (RUS); Yevhen Ziborov (UKR) | 170 | 300 | 8 | 560 | 1038 |
| 22 | Team 16 | Chen Yu-hsuan (TPE); Sergio Flores (MEX) | 215 | 263 | 1 | 480 | 959 |
| | Team 8 | Sofya Prizhennikova (KAZ); Egor Gromadskii (RUS) | 180 | 0 | 0 | 0 | DNF |
| | Team 14 | Agnieszka Wysokińska (POL); Pele Uibel (GER) | 0 | 0 | 0 | 0 | DNS |
