= Athletics at the 2018 Summer Youth Olympics – Boys' hammer throw =

Boys' hammer throw at the III Summer Youth Olympic Games
- Venue: Parque Polideportivo Roca
- Date: 12, 15 October
- Competitors: 16 from 16 nations

Medalists
1st place, gold medalist(s)		Mykhaylo Kokhan	Ukraine
2nd place, silver medalist(s)		Valentin Andreev	Bulgaria
3rd place, bronze medalist(s)		Wang Qi	China

The boys' hammer throw competition at the 2018 Summer Youth Olympics was held on 12 and 15 October, at the Parque Polideportivo Roca.

== Schedule ==
All times are in local time (UTC-3).

Date	Time	Round
12 October 2018	16:20	Stage 1
15 October 2018	16:00	Stage 2

== Results ==
=== Stage 1 ===
Rank	Athlete	Nation	1	2	3	4	Result	Notes
1	Mykhaylo Kokhan	Ukraine	x	80.80	84.90	85.97	85.97	
2	Valentin Andreev	Bulgaria	x	81.11	82.29	x	82.29	
3	Wang Qi	China	76.27	x	79.46	x	79.46	
4	Benedek Doma	Hungary	x	67.61	73.79	x	73.79	
5	Oskari Lahtinen	Finland	72.35	73.71	x	x	73.71	PB
6	Tomasz Ratajczyk	Poland	66.38	x	x	72.11	72.11	
7	Julio Nobile	Argentina	71.22	x	x	x	71.22	
8	Sören Hilbig	Germany	69.69	67.09	69.46	71.12	71.12	
9	Umidjon Khasanov	Uzbekistan	67.31	71.04	67.64	70.56	71.04	PB
10	Theodoros Ziogas	Greece	69.59	x	67.68	69.74	69.74	
11	Aliaksei Yiakimovich	Belarus	x	69.71	67.04	x	69.71	
12	Mohamed Tarek Ismail Mahmoud	Egypt	x	x	65.52	x	65.52	
13	Luis Alberto Ochoa	Colombia	65.42	65.08	x	x	65.42	
14	Giorgi Kekishvili	Georgia	65.08	58.27	x	x	65.08	
15	Nikolaos Kesidis	Cyprus	63.59	x	x	x	63.59	
16	Rodrigo Moran Gaitan	Argentina	60.36	x	x	x	60.36	

=== Stage 2 ===
Rank	Athlete	Nation	1	2	3	4	Result	Notes
1	Mykhaylo Kokhan	Ukraine	x	78.54	85.14	80.33	85.14	
2	Valentin Andreev	Bulgaria	77.36	76.25	78.65	81.67	81.67	
3	Wang Qi	China	74.70	75.90	74.23	72.33	75.90	
4	Tomasz Ratajczyk	Poland	69.89	73.05	x	x	73.05	
5	Benedek Doma	Hungary	70.88	x	70.28	71.65	71.65	
6	Umidjon Khasanov	Uzbekistan	x	66.58	67.52	70.48	70.48	
7	Oskari Lahtinen	Finland	70.11	x	70.20	x	70.20	
8	Theodoros Ziogas	Greece	69.03	67.96	69.46	69.65	69.65	
9	Julio Nobile	Argentina	66.09	69.21	x	x	69.21	
10	Luis Alberto Ochoa	Colombia	68.59	63.78	67.19	64.71	68.59	
11	Sören Hilbig	Germany	66.94	64.35	67.97	66.53	67.97	
12	Mohamed Tarek Ismail Mahmoud	Egypt	61.18	65.75	66.53	67.60	67.60	
13	Nikolaos Kesidis	Cyprus	66.62	x	x	60.70	66.62	
14	Rodrigo Moran Gaitan	Argentina	x	59.12	62.09	x	62.09	
	Giorgi Kekishvili	Georgia					NM	
	Aliaksei Yiakimovich	Belarus					DNS	

=== Final placing ===
Rank	Athlete	Nation	Stage 1	Stage 2	Total
1st place, gold medalist(s)	Mykhaylo Kokhan	Ukraine	85.97	85.14	171.11
2nd place, silver medalist(s)	Valentin Andreev	Bulgaria	82.29	81.67	163.96
3rd place, bronze medalist(s)	Wang Qi	China	79.46	75.90	155.36
4	Benedek Doma	Hungary	73.79	71.65	145.44
5	Tomasz Ratajczyk	Poland	72.11	73.05	145.16
6	Oskari Lahtinen	Finland	73.71	70.20	143.91
7	Umidjon Khasanov	Uzbekistan	71.04	70.48	141.52
8	Julio Nobile	Argentina	71.22	69.21	140.43
9	Theodoros Ziogas	Greece	69.74	69.65	139.39
10	Sören Hilbig	Germany	71.12	67.97	139.09
11	Luis Alberto Ochoa	Colombia	65.42	68.59	134.01
12	Mohamed Tarek Ismail Mahmoud	Egypt	65.52	67.60	133.12
13	Nikolaos Kesidis	Cyprus	63.59	66.62	130.21
14	Rodrigo Moran Gaitan	Argentina	60.36	62.09	122.45
15	Giorgi Kekishvili	Georgia	65.08	NM	65.08
	Aliaksei Yiakimovich	Belarus	69.71	DNS	
