= Ukraine at the 2018 Summer Youth Olympics =

- IOC code: UKR
- NOC: National Olympic Committee of Ukraine
- Website: http://www.noc-ukr.org/

in Buenos Aires, Argentina 6 – 18 October 2018
- Competitors: 55 in 20 sports
- Flag bearer: Mykhaylo Kokhan
- Medals Ranked 10th: Gold 5 Silver 7 Bronze 6 Total 18

Summer Youth Olympics appearances (overview)
- 2010; 2014; 2018

Ukraine participated at the 2018 Summer Youth Olympics in Buenos Aires, Argentina from 6 October to 18 October 2018.

Mykhaylo Kokhan and Yaroslava Mahuchikh (both - athletics), Sofiya Lyskun (diving), Denys Kesil (swimming) represented Ukraine at the 2020 and 2024 Summer Olympics. Oleh Serbin (diving), Khrystyna Pohranychna (rhythmic gymnastics), and Ihor Troianovskyi (swimming) competed at the 2020 Summer Olympics. Oleh Doroshchuk (athletics), Nazar Chepurnyi (gymnastics), and Yaroslav Tkach (sport climbing) competed at the 2024 Summer Olympics. Yaroslava Mahuchikh won bronze at the 2020 Summer Olympics, becoming the first Ukrainian athlete from the 2018 Games to win a medal at both Youth and senior Olympics and the first Ukrainian to do that at the consecutive Games. In 2024, Mahuchikh became the first Ukrainian athlete who won gold medals at both Youth and senior Olympics. Mykhaylo Kokhan also won a medal at the 2024 Summer Games.

== Medalists ==
Medal	Name	Sport	Event	Date
Gold	Kateryna Chorniy	Fencing	Girls' épée	8 Oct
Gold	Ivan Tyshchenko	Rowing	Male single sculls	10 Oct
Gold	Mykhaylo Kokhan	Athletics	Boys' hammer throw	15 Oct
Gold	Yaroslava Mahuchikh	Athletics	Girls' high jump	15 Oct
Gold	Valeriya Ivanenko	Athletics	Boys' hammer throw	15 Oct
Silver	Denys Kesil	Swimming	Boys' 200 metre butterfly	12 Oct
Silver	Sofiya Lyskun	Diving	Girls' 10m platform	13 Oct
Silver	Oksana Chudyk	Wrestling	Girls' freestyle 65 kg	13 Oct
Silver	Nazar Chepurnyi	Gymnastics	Boys' vault	14 Oct
Silver	Khrystyna Pohranychna	Rhythmic gymnastics	Girls' individual all-around	15 Oct
Silver	Taras Bondarchuk	Boxing	Boys' lightweight	17 Oct
Silver	Maksym Halinichev	Boxing	Boys' bantamweight	18 Oct
Bronze	Oleh Veredyba	Judo	Boys' 55 kg	7 Oct
Bronze	Anastasia Bachynska	Gymnastics	Girls' individual all-around	12 Oct
Bronze	Oleh Doroshchuk	Athletics	Boys' high jump	14 Oct
Bronze	Vladyslav Ostapenko	Wrestling	Boys' freestyle 55 kg	14 Oct
Bronze	Anastasia Bachynska	Gymnastics	Girls' floor exercise	15 Oct
Bronze	Daryna Plokhotniuk; Oleksandr Madei	Acrobatic gymnastics	Mixed pairs	15 Oct

Mixed-NOCs events

Medal	Name	Sport	Event	Date
Gold	Kateryna Chorniy	Fencing	Mixed team	10 Oct
Gold	Nazar Chepurnyi	Gymnastics	Mixed multi-discipline team	10 Oct
Silver	Anastasiya Prozorova	Badminton	Mixed Team	12 Oct
Bronze	Dmytro Honta	Shooting	Mixed 10 metre air pistol	12 Oct
Bronze	Sofiya Lyskun	Diving	Mixed team	17 Oct

== Competitors ==
The following is the list of number of competitors participating at the Games per sport.

Sport	Men	Women	Total
Archery	1	1	2
Athletics	4	9	13
Badminton	1	1	2
Basketball	4	4	8
Boxing	2	—	2
Canoeing	1	1	2
Cycling	—	2	2
Diving	1	1	2
Fencing	—	1	1
Gymnastics	2	3	5
Judo	1	1	2
Karate	1	—	1
Modern pentathlon	1	—	1
Rowing	1	—	1
Shooting	1	—	1
Sport climbing	1	—	1
Swimming	2	2	4
Taekwondo	1	—	1
Tennis	—	2	2
Wrestling	1	1	2
Total	26	29	55

== Archery ==
Ukraine qualified two archers based on its performance at the 2017 World Archery Youth Championships.

Individual

Athlete	Event	Ranking round		Round of 32	Round of 16	Quarterfinals	Semifinals	Final / BM	Rank
Athlete	Event	Score	Seed	Opposition Score	Opposition Score	Opposition Score	Opposition Score	Opposition Score	Rank
Artem Ovchynnikov	Boys' Individual	679	6	Fabrizzi (ITA); W 6–2	Tolba (EGY); W 6–5	Dalpatadu (SRI); W 6–2	Cowles (USA); L 0–6	Roos (BEL); L 3–7	4
Zhanna Naumova	Girls' Individual	642	13	Rahmani (IRI); W 6–2	Son (KOR); L 0–6	Did not advance			9

Team

Athletes	Event	Ranking round		Round of 32	Round of 16	Quarterfinals	Semifinals	Final / BM	Rank
Athletes	Event	Score	Seed	Opposition Score	Opposition Score	Opposition Score	Opposition Score	Opposition Score	Rank
Artem Ovchynnikov (UKR); Liliya Trydvornava (BLR)	Mixed team	1298	23	Gatco (MDA); Hurnall (AUS); W 5–3	Kang (PRK); Vaca Cordero (MEX); L 1–5	Did not advance			9
Zhanna Naumova (UKR); Franck Eyeni (CIV)	Mixed team	1300	14	Canales (ESP); Aoshima (JPN); W 5–4	Kharitonova (RUS); Rezowan (BAN); L 4–5	Did not advance			9

== Athletics ==
Ukraine qualified 13 athletes: 4 boys and 9 girls.

Boys
Track & road events

Athlete	Event	Round 1		Round 2		Total	
Athlete	Event	Result	Rank	Result	Rank	Result	Rank
Andrii Vasyliev	100 metres	12.21	38	42.46	36	54.67	36
Oleksandr Honskyi	1500 metres	3:56.39	10	12:58	15	25	14

Field events

Athlete	Event	Round 1		Round 2		Total	
Athlete	Event	Distance	Rank	Distance	Rank	Distance	Rank
Oleh Doroshchuk	High jump	2.09	3	2.14	3	4.23	3rd place, bronze medalist(s)
Mykhaylo Kokhan	Hammer throw	85.97	1	85.14	1	171.11	1st place, gold medalist(s)

Girls
Track & road events

Athlete	Event	Round 1		Round 2		Total	
Athlete	Event	Result	Rank	Result	Rank	Result	Rank
Nataliia Dyshliuk	400 metres	57.67	15	58.06	15	1:55.73	15
Svitlana Zhulzhyk	800 metres	2:09.73	7	2:10.21	7	4:19.94	6
Katerina Onisimova	2000 metre steeplechase	7:00.85	14	14:25	10	24	11
Daryna Kasyan	5000 metre walk	24:01.29	7	25:06.75	8	49:08.04	7

Field events

Athlete	Event	Round 1		Round 2		Total	
Athlete	Event	Distance	Rank	Distance	Rank	Distance	Rank
Mariia Horielova	Long jump	5.71	7	5.79w	9	11.50	9
Yaroslava Mahuchikh	High jump	1.92	1	1.95	1	3.87	1st place, gold medalist(s)
Mariia Yashchenko	Pole vault	3.65	9	3.42	14	7.07	9
Anastasiia Derkach	Shot put	14.78	9	14.66	10	29.44	10
Valeriya Ivanenko	Hammer throw	74.90	1	72.08	1	146.98	1st place, gold medalist(s)

== Badminton ==
Ukraine qualified one player based on the Badminton Junior World Rankings.

Singles

Athlete	Event	Group stage				Quarterfinal	Semifinal	Final / BM	Rank
Athlete	Event	Opposition Score	Opposition Score	Opposition Score	Rank	Opposition Score	Opposition Score	Opposition Score	Rank
Danylo Bosniuk	Boys' Singles	Farias (BRA); W 2–0	Sen (IND); L 0–2	Mostafa Kamel (EGY); W 2–0	2	Did not advance			9
Anastasiya Prozorova	Girls' Singles	Vũ (VIE); L 0–2	Delcheva (BUL); L 0–2	Akoumba Ze (CMR); W 2–0	3	Did not advance			9

Team

Athlete	Event	Group stage				Quarterfinal	Semifinal	Final / BM	Rank
Athlete	Event	Opposition Score	Opposition Score	Opposition Score	Rank	Opposition Score	Opposition Score	Opposition Score	Rank
Team Zeta; Danylo Bosniuk (UKR); Christopher Grimley (GBR); Kettiya Keoxay (LAO); Nhat Nguyen (IRL); Maharani Sekar Batari (INA); Jaslyn Hooi (SGP); Nairoby Abigail Jiménez (DOM); Vivien Sándorházi (HUN)	Mixed Teams	Delta (MIX); L (95–110)	Epsilon (MIX); W (110–89)	Alpha (MIX); L (103–110)	3Q	Sigma (MIX); W (110–106)	Omega (MIX); L (109–110)	Theta (MIX); L (107–110)	4
Team Omega; Anastasiya Prozorova (UKR); Markus Barth (NOR); Oscar Guo (NZL); Chang Ho Kim (FIJ); Kunlavut Vitidsarn (THA); Huang Yin-hsuan (TPE); Léonice Huet (FRA); Vũ Thị Anh Thư (VIE)	Mixed Teams	Gamma (MIX); W (110–99)	Theta (MIX); W (110–100)	Sigma (MIX); W (110–98)	1Q	Epsilon (MIX); W (110–102)	Zeta (MIX); W (110–109)	Alpha (MIX); L (106–110)	2nd place, silver medalist(s)

== Basketball ==
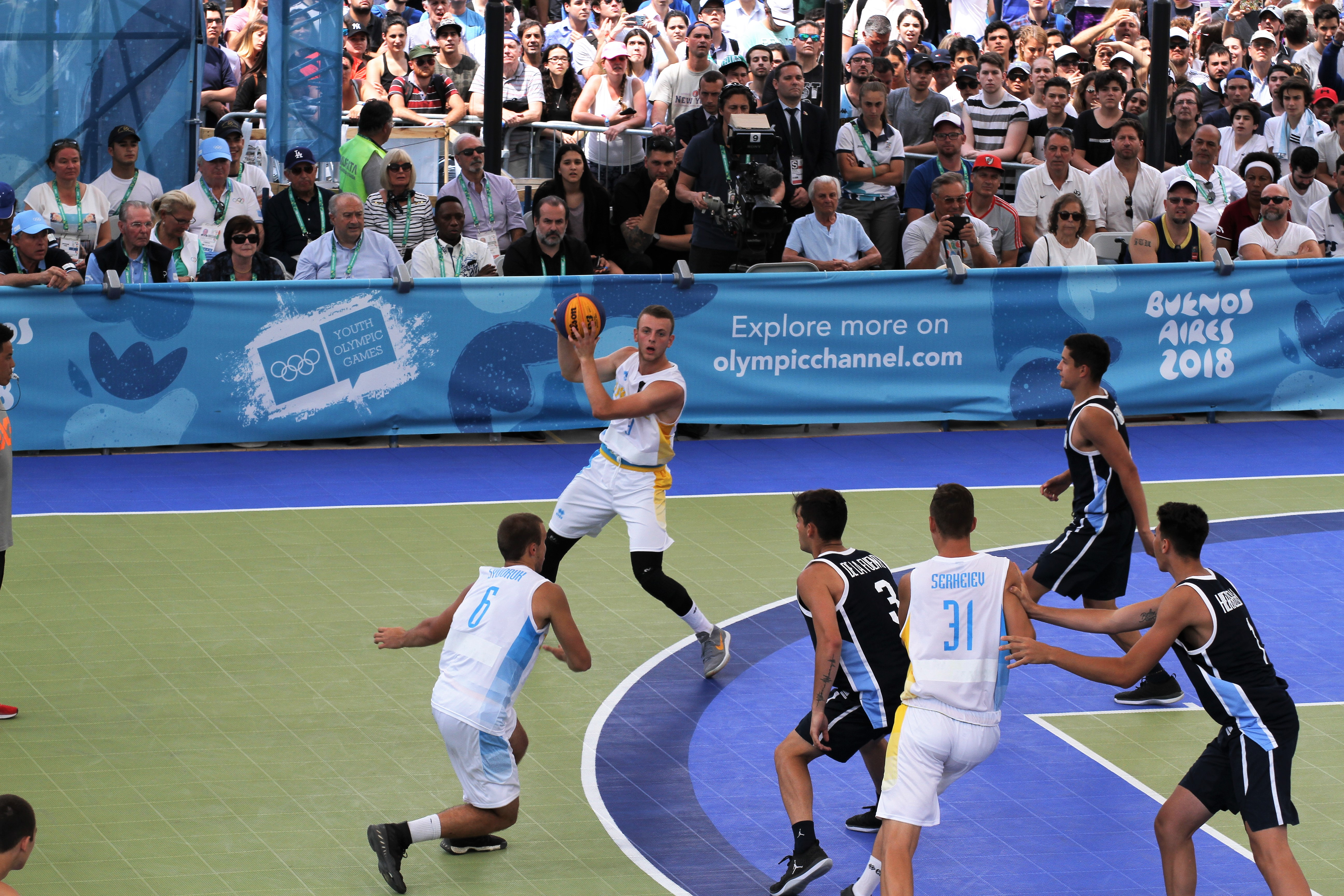
Ukraine playing again Argentina in the semifinal of the boys' tournament

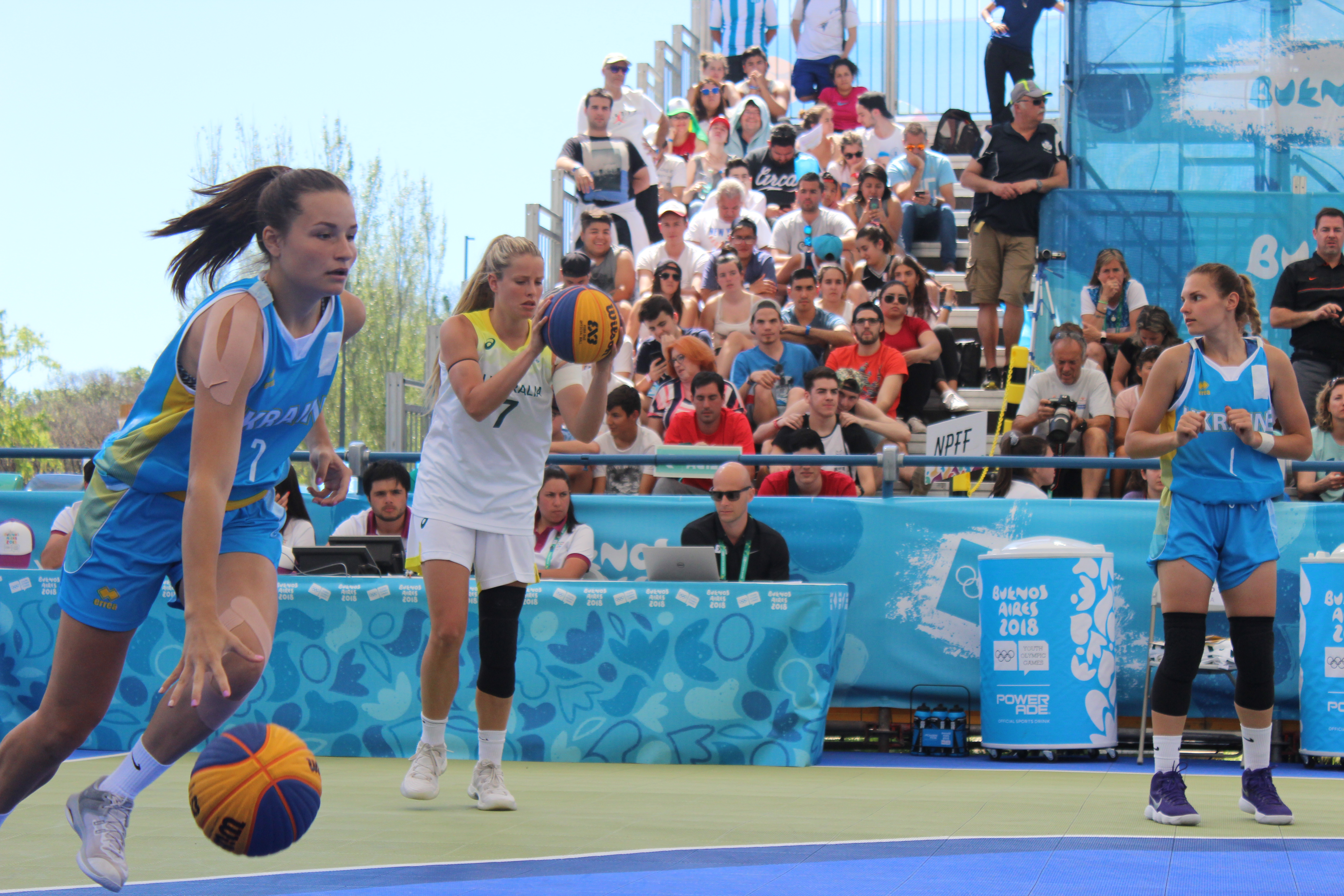
Quarterfinal between Australia and Ukraine in the girls' tournament

Ukraine qualified a boys' and girls' team based on the U18 3x3 National Federation Ranking.

- Boys' tournament - 1 team of 4 athletes
- Girls' tournament - 1 team of 4 athletes

=== Competition results ===
Girls' shoot-out contest

Athlete	Event	Final rank
Illia Zaiets; Ihor Sergeiev; Oleksandr Sydoruk; Vitalii Shorstkyi	Boys' tournament	4
Yuliia Hutevych; Veronika Kosmach; Anzhelika Liashko; Anna Suhak	Girls' tournament	7

Girls' shoot-out contest

Athlete	Event	Qualification		Final	
Athlete	Event	Points	Rank	Points	Rank
Yuliia Hutevych	Shoot-out contest	5	30	Did not advance	

=== Boys' tournament ===
==== Preliminary round ====
Pool B

Team	Pld	W	L	PF	PA	PPM
Ukraine	4	4	0	85	49	21.3
Brazil	4	3	1	71	64	17.8
New Zealand	4	2	2	72	72	18.0
Venezuela	4	1	3	72	74	18.0
Andorra	4	0	4	39	80	9.8

8 October	Ukraine	22–5	Andorra
11:00
		Boxscore

8 October	Ukraine	20–15	Brazil
13:00
		Boxscore

12 October	Venezuela	16–22	Ukraine
11:00
		Boxscore

12 October	New Zealand	13–21	Ukraine
13:30
		Boxscore

==== Knockout round ====
Quarterfinals

16 October	Ukraine	14–11	Italy
13:15
		Boxscore

Semifinals

17 October	Ukraine	16–18 (OT)	Argentina
12:15
		Boxscore

Third place game

17 October	Slovenia	21–13	Ukraine
13:05
		Boxscore

=== Girls' tournament ===
==== Preliminary round ====
Pool B

Pos	Team	Pld	W	L	PF	PA	PD	Pts
1	United States	4	4	0	84	30	+54	8
2	Ukraine	4	3	1	70	44	+26	7
3	Venezuela	4	1	3	56	69	−13	5
4	Sri Lanka	4	1	3	41	75	−34	5
5	Egypt	4	1	3	41	74	−33	5

8 October	Ukraine	22–11	Venezuela
17:00

8 October	Ukraine	21–6	Egypt
18:30

12 October	Sri Lanka	6–18	Ukraine
15:00

12 October	United States	21–9	Ukraine
17:30

==== Knockout round ====
Quarterfinals

16 October	Australia	16–6	Ukraine
1

== Boxing ==
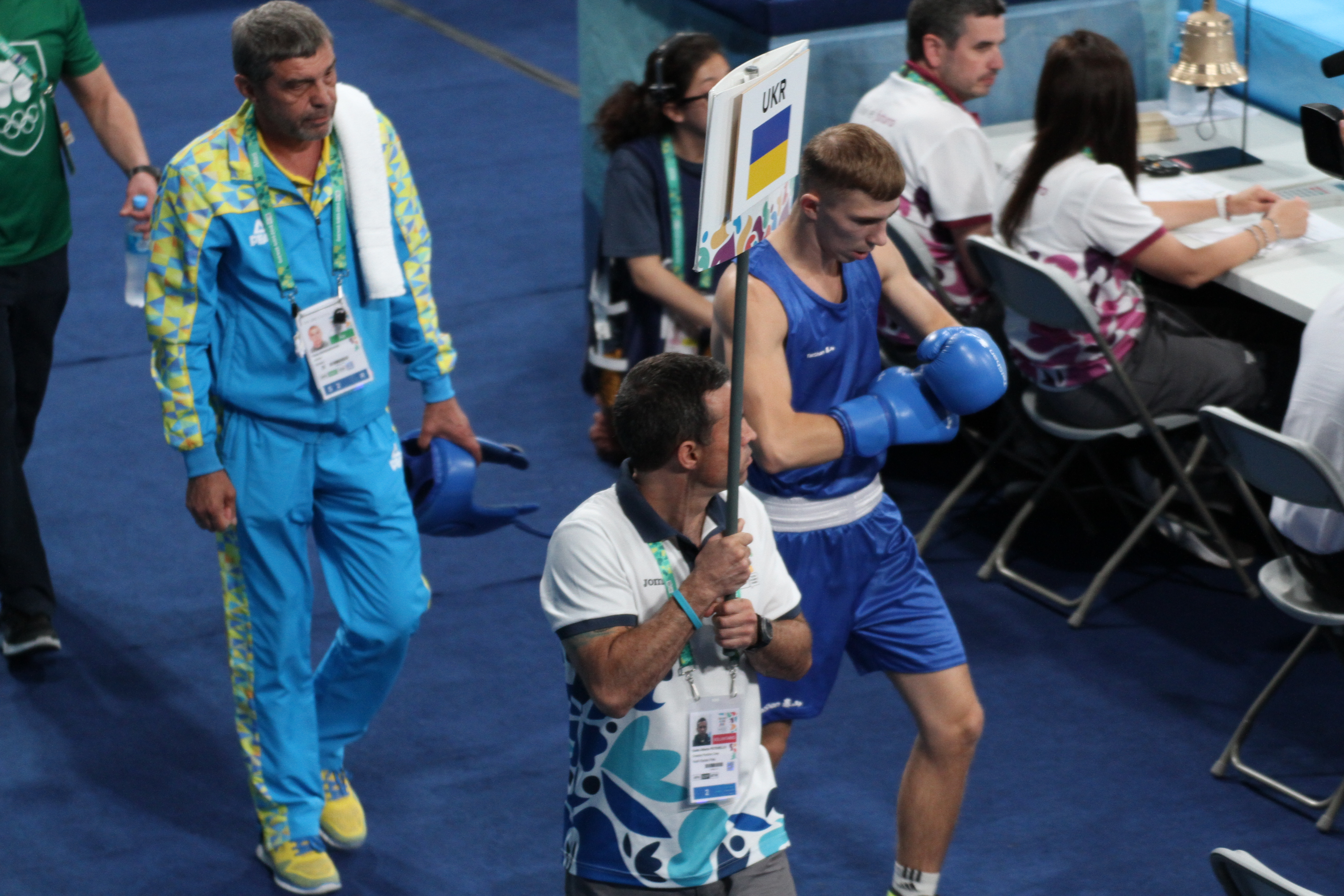
Taras Bondarchuk before the final bout in boys' -60 kg

Boys

Athlete	Event	Preliminary R1	Preliminary R2	Semifinals	Final / RM	Rank
Athlete	Event	Opposition Result	Opposition Result	Opposition Result	Opposition Result	Rank
Maksym Halinichev	-56 kg	Amram (NRU); W 5–0	—N/a	Abbaz (MAR); W 5–0	Khalokov (UZB); L 0-5	2nd place, silver medalist(s)
Taras Bondarchuk	-60 kg	Murdoch-McKeich (NZL); W 5–0	—N/a	Mamdouh (EGY); W 5-0	Phoemsap (THA); L 0-5	2nd place, silver medalist(s)

== Canoeing ==
Ukraine qualified two boats based on its performance at the 2018 World Qualification Event.

- Boys' C1 - 1 boat
- Girls' C1 - 1 boat

Boys

Athlete	Event	Qualification		Repechage		Quarterfinals	Semifinals	Final / BM	Rank
Athlete	Event	Time	Rank	Time	Rank	Opposition Result	Opposition Result	Opposition Result	Rank
Taras Kuzyk	C1 sprint	1:57.54	7	1:54.61	2	Bakhraddin (KAZ); L 1:57.48	Did not advance		
Taras Kuzyk	C1 slalom	1:23.49	3	Bye		Palla (HUN); W 1:23.87	Anderson (NZL); L 1:22.64	Bernárdez (ESP); L 1:24.01	4

Girls

Athlete	Event	Qualification		Repechage		Round of 16	Quarterfinals	Semifinals	Final / BM	Rank
Athlete	Event	Time	Rank	Time	Rank	Opposition Result	Opposition Result	Opposition Result	Opposition Result	Rank
Amina Palamarchuk	C1 sprint	2:23.23	6	Bye		Arias (CHI); W 2:20.61	Gonczol (HUN); L 2:31.18	Did not advance		
Amina Palamarchuk	C1 slalom	1:44.75	13	1:43.12	3	Lewandowski (GER); L 1:53.71	Did not advance			

== Cycling ==
Ukraine qualified to compete in girls' combined team.

- Girls' combined team - 1 team of 2 athletes

Combined team

Athlete	Event	Time trial			Road race			Cross-country Eliminator		Cross-country Short circuit		Criterium		Total points	Rank
Athlete	Event	Time	Rank	Points	Time	Rank	Points	Rank	Points	Rank	Points	Rank	Points	Total points	Rank
Olha Kulynych	Girls' combined team	10:12.32	13	4	1:42:19	26	0	22	0	5	40	2	80	124	10
Oleksandra Logvinyuk	Girls' combined team	10:12.32	13	4	1:42:19	24	0	26	0	35	0	26	0	124	10

== Diving ==
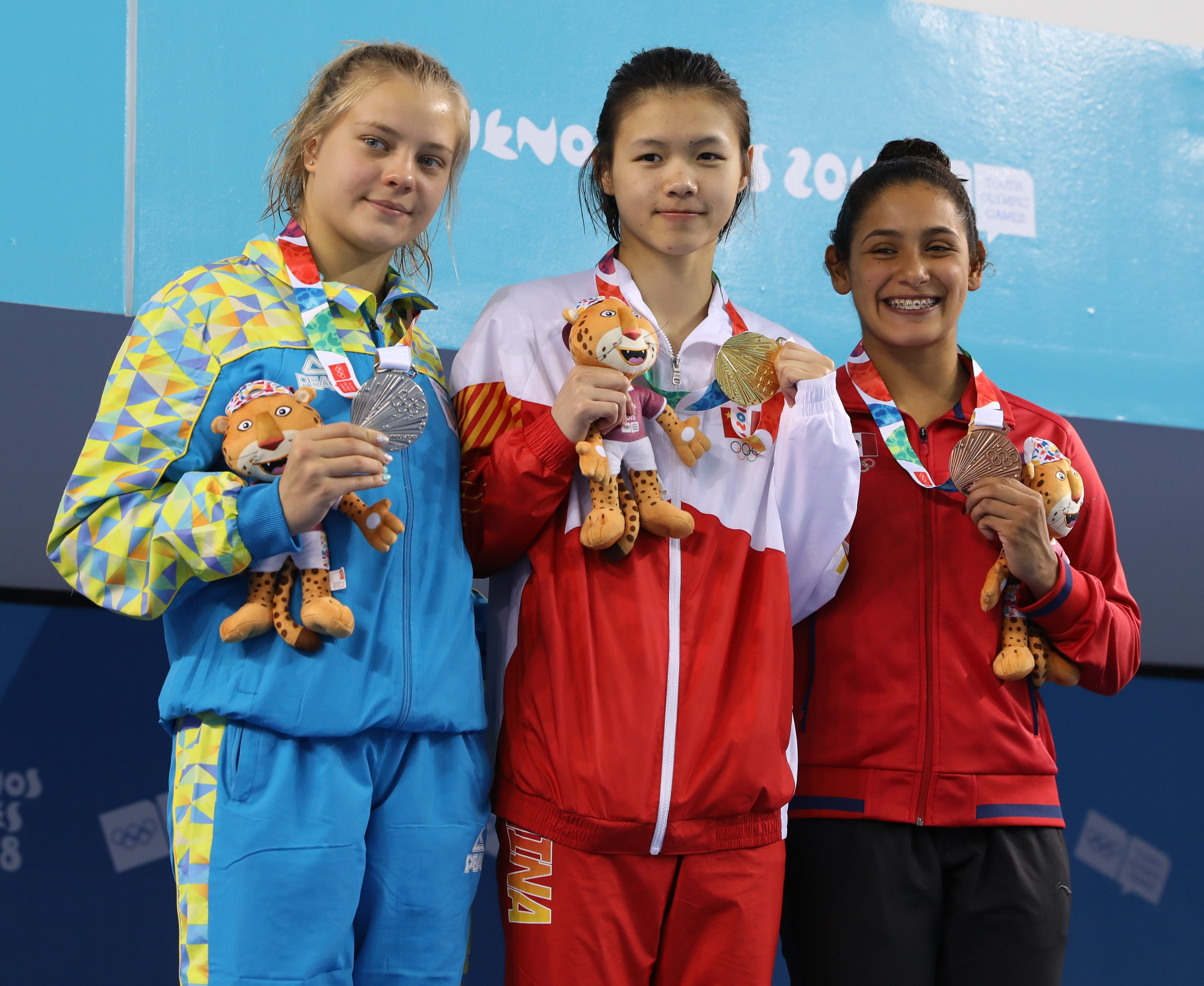
Sofiya Lyskun on podium

Athlete	Event	Preliminary		Final	
Athlete	Event	Points	Rank	Points	Rank
Oleh Serbin	Boys' 10 m platform	493.95	6	486.50	6
Sofiya Lyskun	Girls' 3 m springboard	416.75	4	398.75	11
Sofiya Lyskun	Girls' 10 m platform	420.80	3	406.10	2nd place, silver medalist(s)
Sofiya Lyskun (UKR); Ruslan Ternovoi (RUS)	Mixed team	—N/a		371.15	3rd place, bronze medalist(s)
Chiara Pellacani (ITA); Oleh Serbin (UKR)	Mixed team	—N/a		333.40	6

== Fencing ==
Girls

Athlete	Event	Qualification			Round of 16	Quarterfinals	Semifinals	Final / BM	Rank
Athlete	Event	Victories	Loses	Rank	Opposition Result	Opposition Result	Opposition Result	Opposition Result	Rank
Kateryna Chorniy	Girls' épée	Amer (EGY); W 5—1; Wasiak (BEL); W 5—4; Tae-hee (KOR); W 5—1; Hsieh (HKG); W 5—2	Bieleszová (CZE); L 4—5; Dyner (CRC); L 3—5	2	Muridova (KAZ); W 15—10	Dékány (HUN); W 14—13	Bieleszová (CZE); W 15—11	Hsieh (HKG); W 11—9	1st place, gold medalist(s)

Mixed

Athlete	Event	Qualification		Quarterfinals	Semifinals/Repechage	Final / Placement match	Rank
Athlete	Event	Points	Rank	Opposition Result	Opposition Result	Opposition Result	Rank
Europe 1 Kateryna Chorniy (UKR); Martina Favaretto (ITA); Liza Pusztai (HUN); Davide Di Veroli (ITA); Armand Spichiger (FRA); Krisztián Rabb (HUN)	Mixed team	7	1	Africa; W 30—18	Europe 3 W 30—22	Asia-Oceania 1 W 28—25	1st place, gold medalist(s)

== Gymnastics ==
=== Acrobatic ===
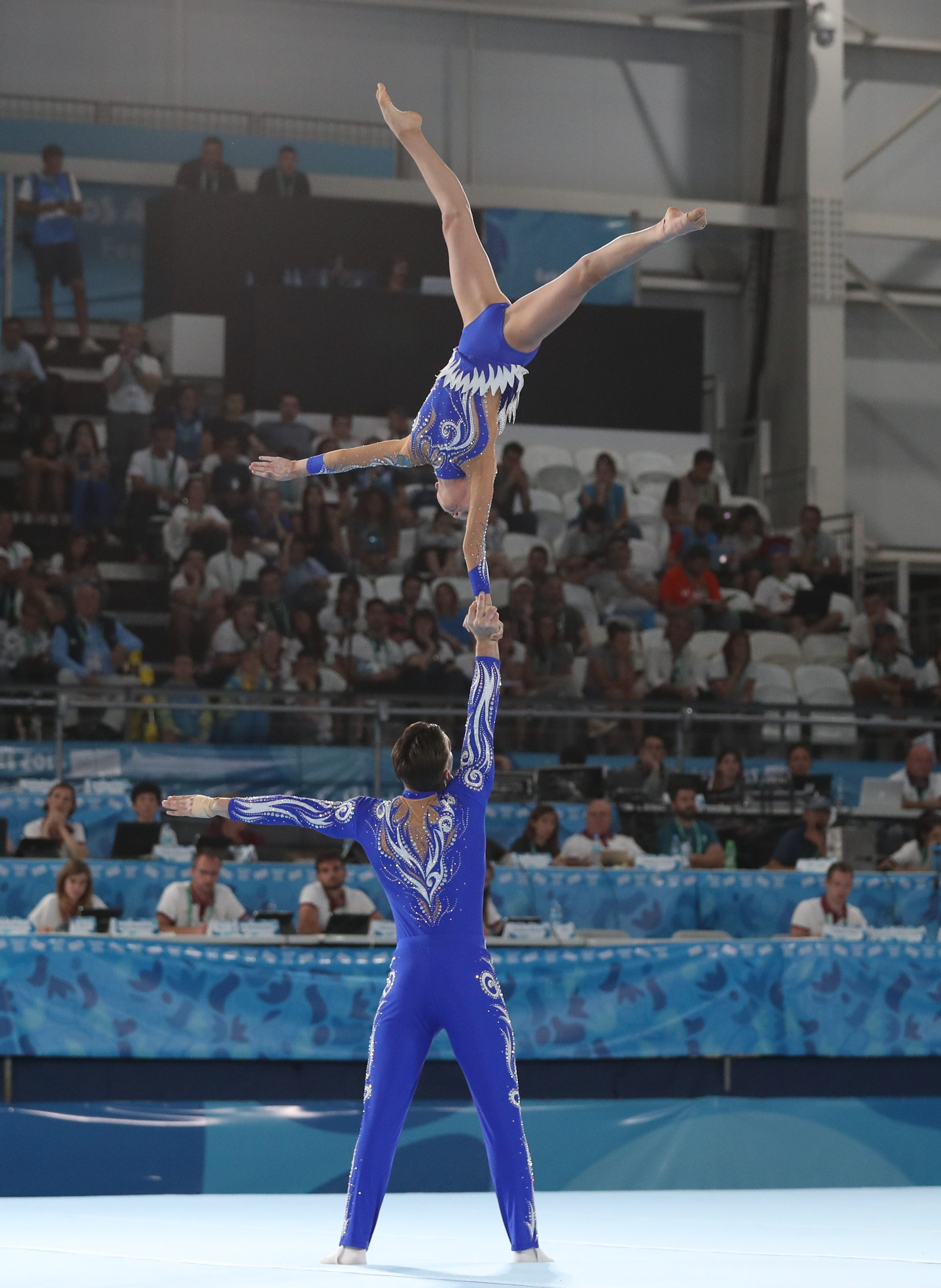
Plokhotniuk and Madei performing in the final

Ukraine qualified a mixed pair based on its performance at the 2018 Acrobatic Gymnastics World Championship.

- Mixed pair - 1 team of 2 athletes

Mixed pair

Athletes	Event	Qualification						Final	
Athletes	Event	BE	Rank	DE	Rank	CE	Rank	CE	Rank
Daryna Plokhotniuk; Oleksandr Madei	Mixed pairs	27.600	1	27.400	5	27.000	4 Q	27.450	3rd place, bronze medalist(s)

=== Artistic ===
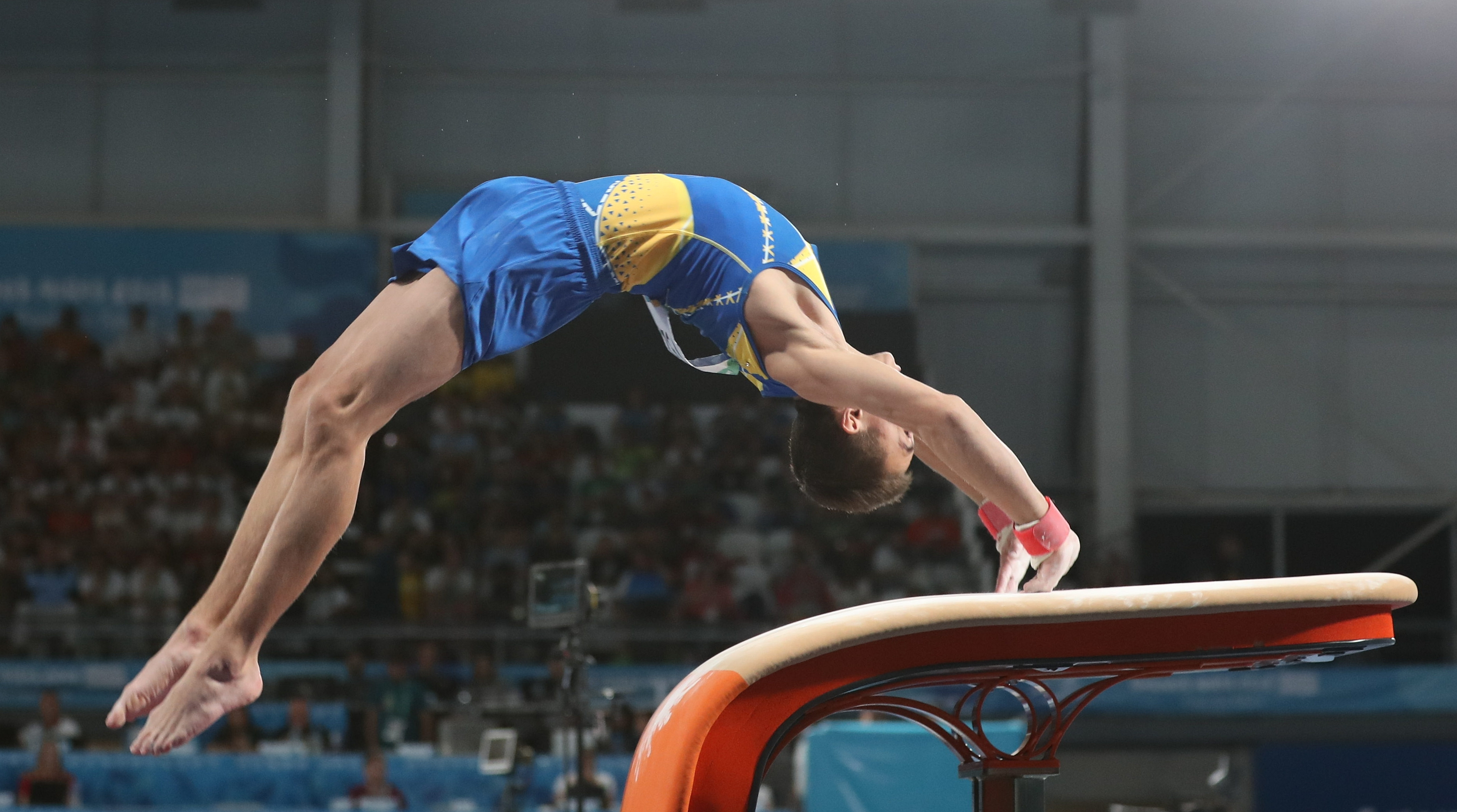
Nazar Chepurnyi performing in the vaults competition

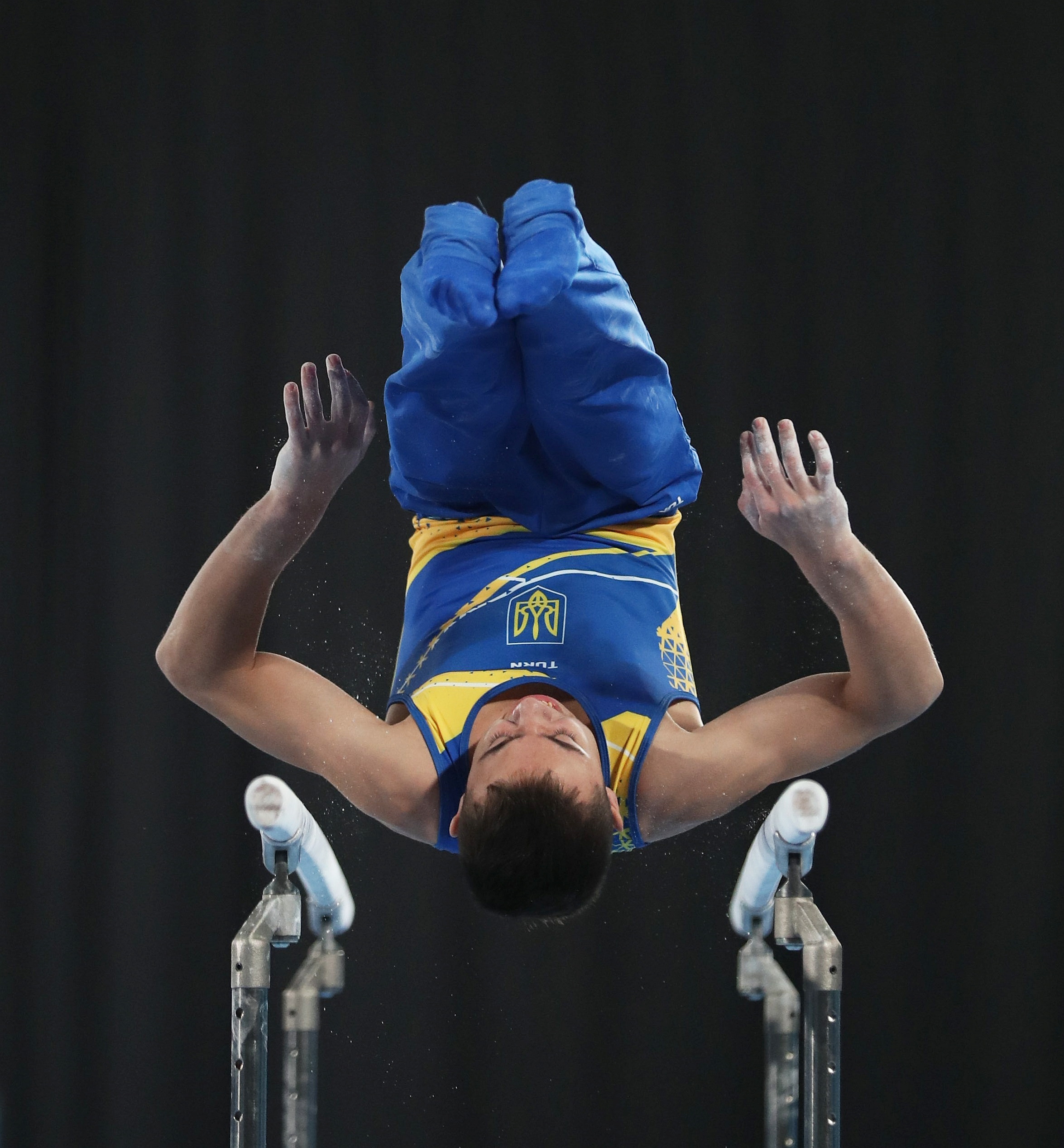
Nazar Chepurnyi competing on parallel bars

Ukraine qualified two gymnasts based on its performance at the 2018 European Junior Championship.

- Boys' artistic individual all-around - 1 quota
- Girls' artistic individual all-around - 1 quota

Boys
Qualification

Athlete	Event	Qualification							
Athlete	Event	Apparatus						Total	Rank
Athlete	Event	F	PH	R	V	PB	HB	Total	Rank
Nazar Chepurnyi	Boys' artistic qualification	13.566	12.400 q	12.266	13.550 q	13.833 q	12.400	77.465	10 Q

All-around

Athlete	Event	Final							
Athlete	Event	Apparatus						Total	Rank
Athlete	Event	F	PH	R	V	PB	HB	Total	Rank
Nazar Chepurnyi	All-around	13.666	12.900	13.100	13.833	13.666	12.166	79.331	6

Apparatus finals

Athlete	Event	Total	Rank
Nazar Chepurnyi	Vault	13.983	2nd place, silver medalist(s)
Nazar Chepurnyi	Floor exercise	13.500	4
Nazar Chepurnyi	Parallel bars	13.466	4

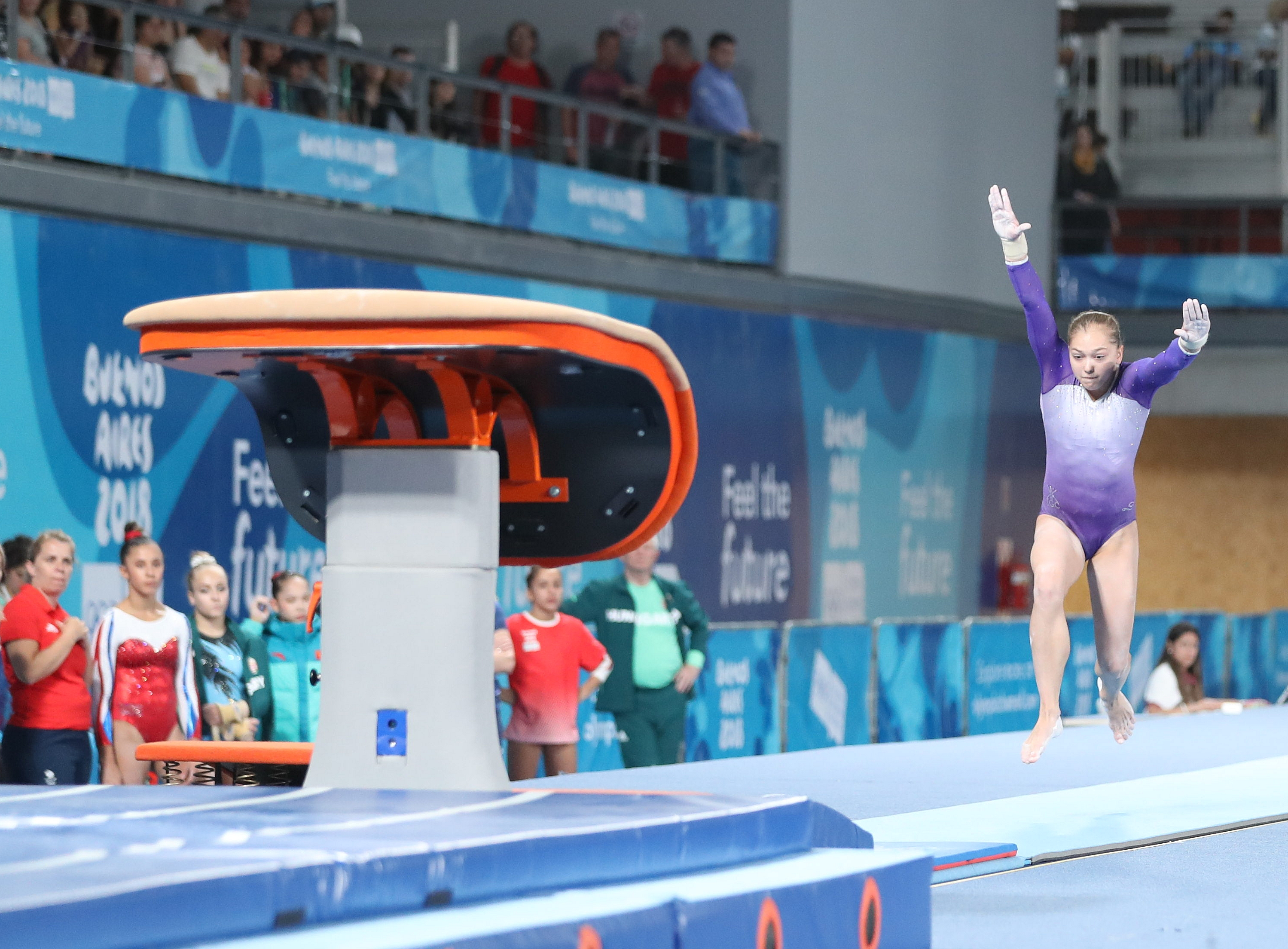
Anastasia Bachynska in vault qualification

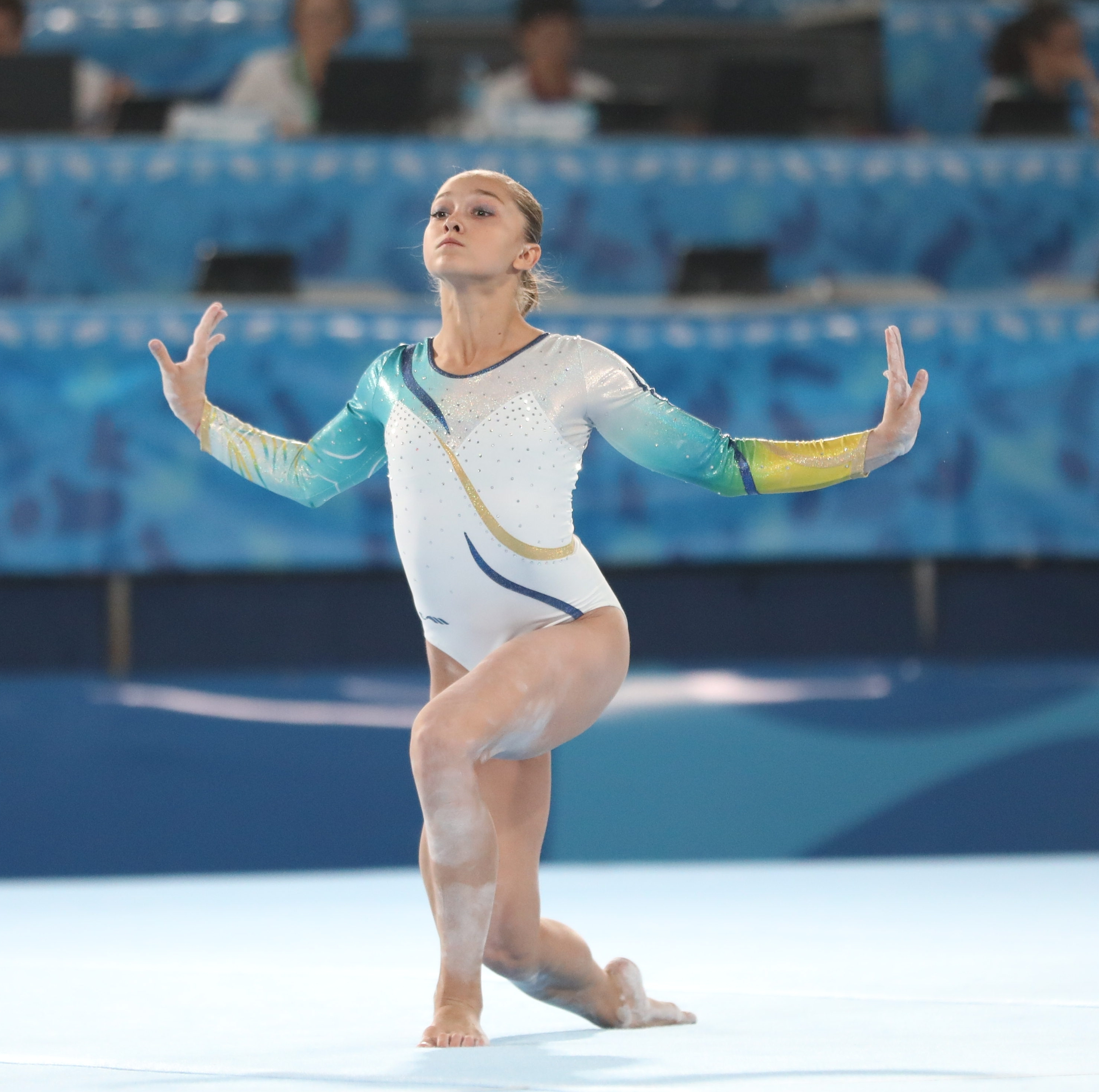
Anastasia Bachynska during the floor exercises in the all-round competition

Girls
Qualification

Athlete	Event	Qualification					
Athlete	Event	Apparatus				Total	Rank
Athlete	Event	V	UB	BB	F	Total	Rank
Anastasia Bachynska	Women's artistic qualification	13.900 q	13.466 q	13.400 q	13.300 q	54.066	1 Q

All-around

Athlete	Event	Final					
Athlete	Event	Apparatus				Total	Rank
Athlete	Event	V	UB	BB	F	Total	Rank
Anastasia Bachynska	All-around	13.866	13.433	12.933	12.100	52.332	3rd place, bronze medalist(s)

Apparatus finals

Athlete	Event	Total	Rank
Anastasia Bachynska	Vault	13.400	4
Anastasia Bachynska	Floor exercise	13.166	3rd place, bronze medalist(s)
Anastasia Bachynska	Uneven bars	13.133	6
Anastasia Bachynska	Balance beam	11.800	6

=== Rhythmic ===
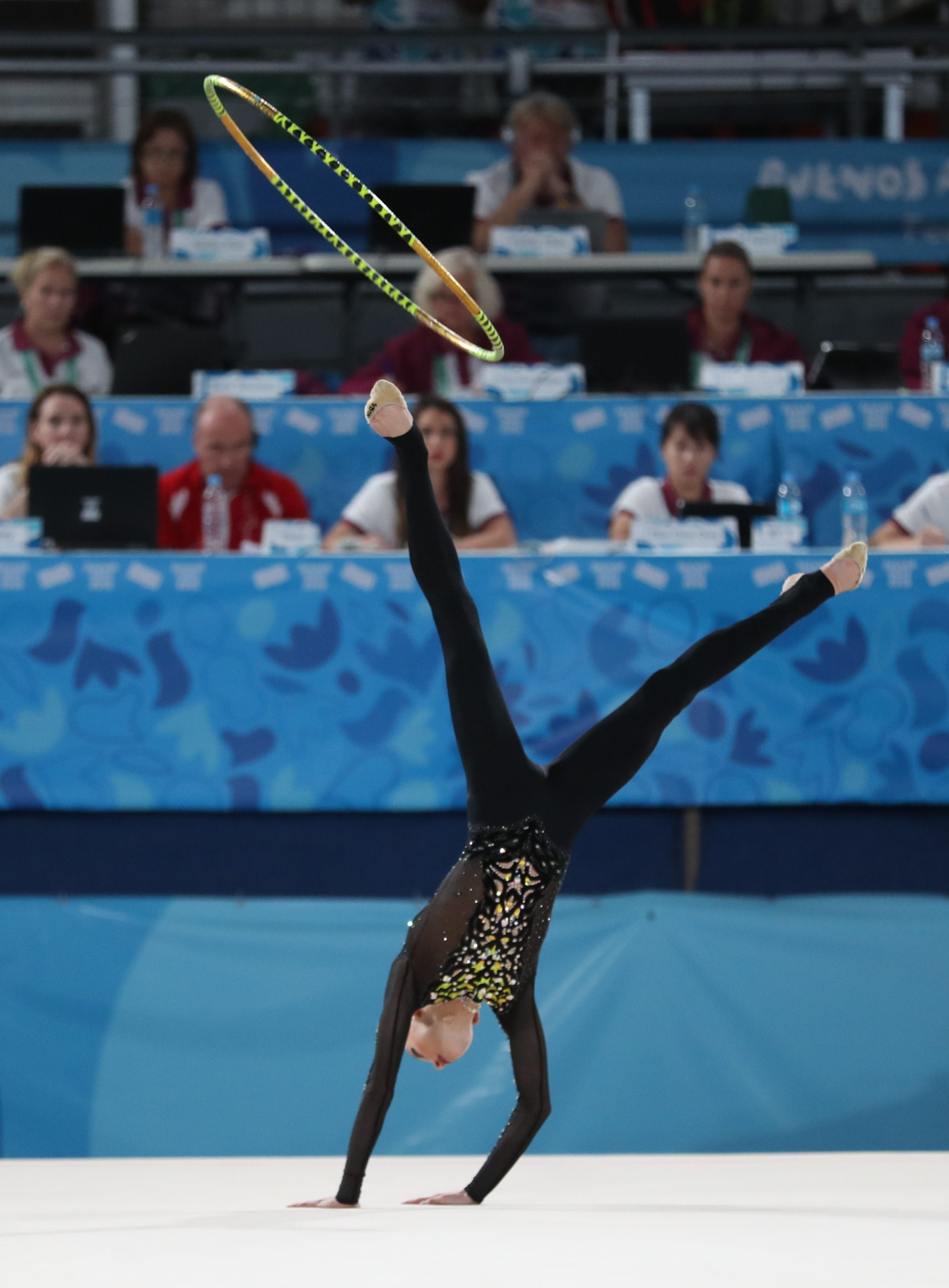
Hrystyna Pohranychna performing with the hoop

Ukraine qualified one rhythmic gymnast based on its performance at the European qualification event.

- Girls' rhythmic individual all-around - 1 quota

All-around

Athlete	Event	Qualification						Final					
Athlete	Event	Apparatus				Total	Rank	Apparatus				Total	Rank
Athlete	Event	H	B	C	R	Total	Rank	H	B	C	R	Total	Rank
Khrystyna Pohranychna	All-around	17.000	15.350	16.450	13.250	62.050	3 Q	17.750	14.850	16.950	15.550	65.100	2nd place, silver medalist(s)

=== Mixed multi-discipline team ===
Rank	Team	Athlete	Acrobatic			Artistic								Rhythmic				Trampoline		Total points
Rank	Team	Athlete	D	B	C	Floor (gymnastics)	Pommel horse	Rings (gymnastics)	Vault (gymnastics)	Parallel bars	Horizontal bar	Uneven bars	Balance beam	Hoop (rhythmic gymnastics)	Ball (rhythmic gymnastics)	Clubs (rhythmic gymnastics)	Ribbon (rhythmic gymnastics)	R1	R2	Total points
1st place, gold medalist(s)	Simone; Biles (Orange)	Mariela Kostadinova (BUL); Panayot Dimitrov (BUL)	5	4	1															293
1st place, gold medalist(s)	Simone; Biles (Orange)	Ruan Lange (RSA)				–	–	–	17	–	–									293
1st place, gold medalist(s)	Simone; Biles (Orange)	Krisztián Balázs (HUN)				6	10	11	–	5	2									293
1st place, gold medalist(s)	Simone; Biles (Orange)	Nazar Chepurnyi (UKR)				5	11	18	19	3	14									293
1st place, gold medalist(s)	Simone; Biles (Orange)	Tamara Ong (SGP)				17			–			–	21							293
1st place, gold medalist(s)	Simone; Biles (Orange)	Phạm Như Phương (VIE)				11			20			17	–							293
1st place, gold medalist(s)	Simone; Biles (Orange)	Alba Petisco (ESP)				–			7			14	19							293
1st place, gold medalist(s)	Simone; Biles (Orange)	Talisa Torretti (ITA)												4	5	2	2			293
1st place, gold medalist(s)	Simone; Biles (Orange)	Daria Trubnikova (RUS)												1	1	1	1			293
1st place, gold medalist(s)	Simone; Biles (Orange)	Yelyzaveta Luzan (AZE)												–	–	–	–			293
1st place, gold medalist(s)	Simone; Biles (Orange)	Liam Christie (AUS)																9	8	293
1st place, gold medalist(s)	Simone; Biles (Orange)	Fan Xinyi (CHN)																1	1	293
5	Dong Dong (Purple)	Rachel Nell (RSA); Sidwell Madibeng (RSA)	11	11	11															389
5	Dong Dong (Purple)	Daniel Schwed (GER)				8	4	–	16	22	13									389
5	Dong Dong (Purple)	Marcus Stenberg (SWE)				12	–	15	–	–	–									389
5	Dong Dong (Purple)	Diogo Soares (BRA)				–	7	7	8	9	3									389
5	Dong Dong (Purple)	Beatriz Cardoso (POR)				22			11			–	–							389
5	Dong Dong (Purple)	Ana Maria Puiu (ROU)				–			17			19	6							389
5	Dong Dong (Purple)	Lee Yun-seo (KOR)				20			–			6	20							389
5	Dong Dong (Purple)	Aurora Arvelo (FIN)												19	9	–	10			389
5	Dong Dong (Purple)	Khrystyna Pohranychna (UKR)												2	8	3	9			389
5	Dong Dong (Purple)	Wang Zilu (CHN)												–	–	12	–			389
5	Dong Dong (Purple)	Nikita Babyonishev (UZB)																10	6	389
5	Dong Dong (Purple)	Yekaterina Lukina (KAZ)																11	12	389
7	Yang Wei (Red)	Liu Yiqian (CHN); Li Zhengyang (CHN)	9	9	9															403
7	Yang Wei (Red)	Félix Dolci (CAN)				9	12	4	3	21	5									403
7	Yang Wei (Red)	Martin Guðmundsson (ISL)				10	–	–	13	–	–									403
7	Yang Wei (Red)	Bora Tarhan (TUR)				–	15	13	–	18	17									403
7	Yang Wei (Red)	Kryxia Alicea (PUR)				–			–			DNS	–							403
7	Yang Wei (Red)	Aliaksandra Varabyova (BLR)				13			19			23	12							403
7	Yang Wei (Red)	Anastasiia Bachynska (UKR)				1			3			2	2							403
7	Yang Wei (Red)	Maria Arakaki (BRA)												–	–	18	–			403
7	Yang Wei (Red)	Paula Serrano (ESP)												16	12	9	18			403
7	Yang Wei (Red)	Xitlali Santana (MEX)												24	21	–	21			403
7	Yang Wei (Red)	Andrew Stamp (GBR)																5	7	403
7	Yang Wei (Red)	Jessica Pickering (AUS)																8	2	403
8	Kohei; Uchimura (Blue)	Daryna Plokhotniuk (UKR); Oleksandr Madei (UKR)	1	5	4															407
8	Kohei; Uchimura (Blue)	Abdulaziz Mirvaliev (UZB)				16	24	17	15	19	24									407
8	Kohei; Uchimura (Blue)	Michael Torres (PUR)				24	16	21	18	15	23									407
8	Kohei; Uchimura (Blue)	Ondřej Kalný (CZE)				did not start														407
8	Kohei; Uchimura (Blue)	Amelie Morgan (GBR)				4			4			4	8							407
8	Kohei; Uchimura (Blue)	Tang Xijing (CHN)				5			–			3	1							407
8	Kohei; Uchimura (Blue)	Csenge Bácskay (HUN)				–			5			–	–							407
8	Kohei; Uchimura (Blue)	Josephine Juul Møller (NOR)												–	13	21	–			407
8	Kohei; Uchimura (Blue)	Denisa Stoian (ROU)												14	19	–	14			407
8	Kohei; Uchimura (Blue)	Anna Kamenshchikova (BLR)												3	–	7	12			407
8	Kohei; Uchimura (Blue)	Noureddine-Younes Belkhir (ALG)																11	10	407
8	Kohei; Uchimura (Blue)	Emily Mussmann (SUI)																4	3	407

== Judo ==
Individual

Athlete	Event	Round of 16	Quarterfinals	Semifinals	Rep 1	Rep 2	Rep 3	Final / BM	Rank
Athlete	Event	Opposition Result	Opposition Result	Opposition Result	Opposition Result	Opposition Result	Opposition Result	Opposition Result	Rank
Oleh Veredyba	Boys' 55 kg	Ariel Shulman (ISR); W 10-00	Bryan Garboa (ECU); W 10-00s1	Temuujin Ganburged (MGL); L 00-10	Bye			Romain Valadier-Picard (FRA); W 10-00s3	3rd place, bronze medalist(s)
Anastasia Balaban	Girls' 44 kg	Paulina Țurcan (MDA); W 10-00	Eva Pérez Soler (ESP); W 10-00	María Giménez (VEN); L 00-01	Bye			Erza Muminoviq (KOS); L 10-00	4

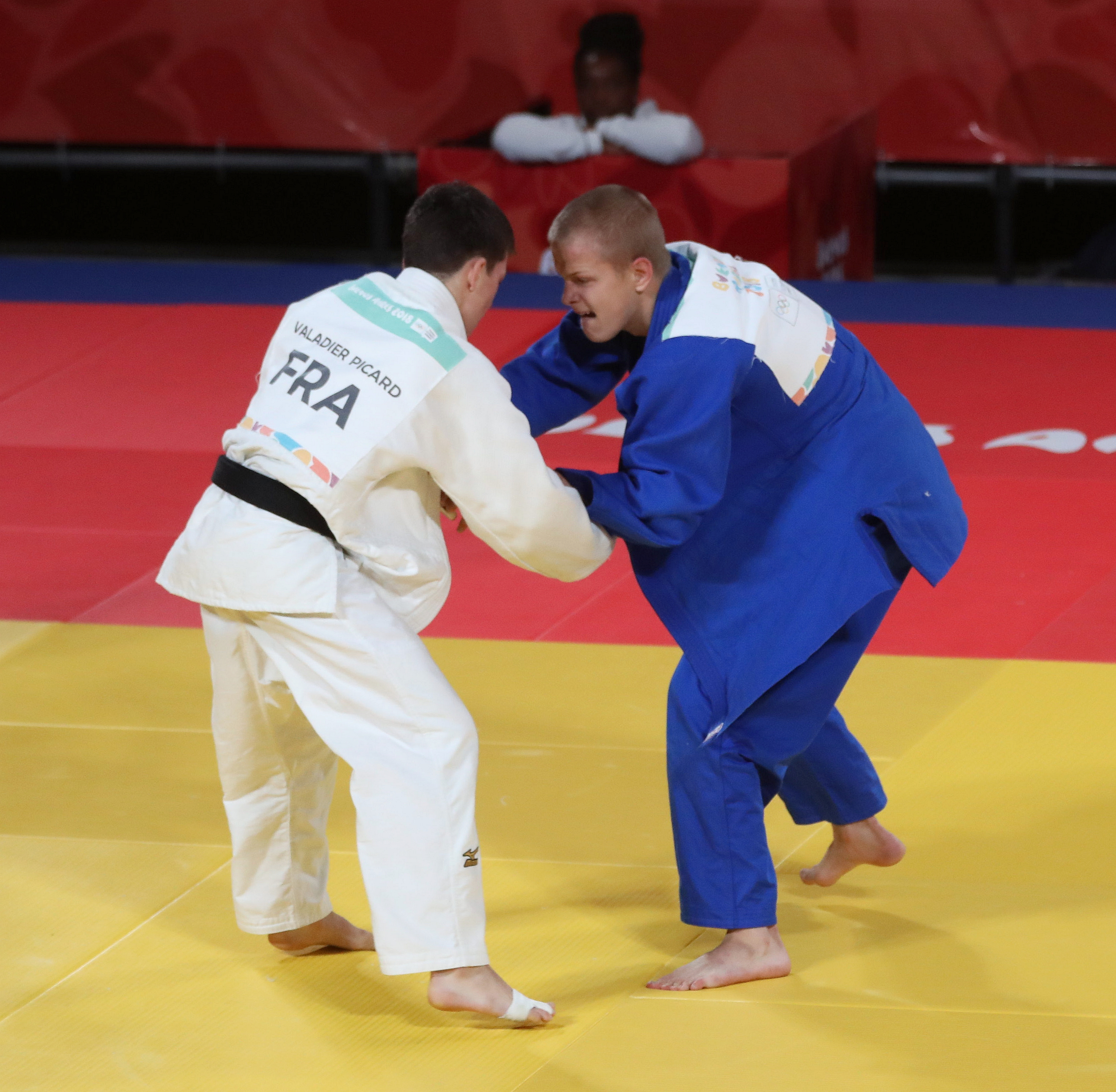
Oleh Veredyba in the bronze final

Team

Athletes	Event	Round of 16	Quarterfinals	Semifinals	Final	
Athletes	Event	Opposition Result	Opposition Result	Opposition Result	Opposition Result	Rank
Team Singapore; Ahad Al-Sagheer (YEM); Anastasia Balaban (UKR); Bryan Garboa (ECU); Sarah Kafufula (COD); Mariem Khlifi (TUN); Ahmed Mohamed Fahmy (EGY); Eduarda Rosa (BRA); Ilia Sulamanidze (GEO)	Mixed Team	Team Moscow (MIX); L 3–4	Did not advance			
Team Montreal; Houda Faissal Abdourahman (DJI); Nemesis Candelo (PAN); Szofi Ozbas (HUN); Ester Svobodova (CZE); Oleh Veredyba (UKR); Kimy Bravo Blanco (CUB); Rhys Allan (AUS); Julian Gutierrez (MEX)	Mixed Team	Team Beijing (MIX); L 2–5	Did not advance			

== Karate ==
Ukraine qualified one athlete based on its performance at one of the Karate Qualification Tournaments.

- Boys' -68 kg - Robert Shyroian

Athlete	Event	Elimination round				Semifinals	Final	
Athlete	Event	Opposition Score	Opposition Score	Opposition Score	Rank	Opposition Score	Opposition Score	Rank
Robert Shyroian	Boys' -61 kg	Quentin Mahauden (BEL); D 0–0	Rosario Ruggiero (ITA); L 0–3	Bojan Bošković (MNE); L 0–3	4	Did not advance		

== Modern pentathlon ==
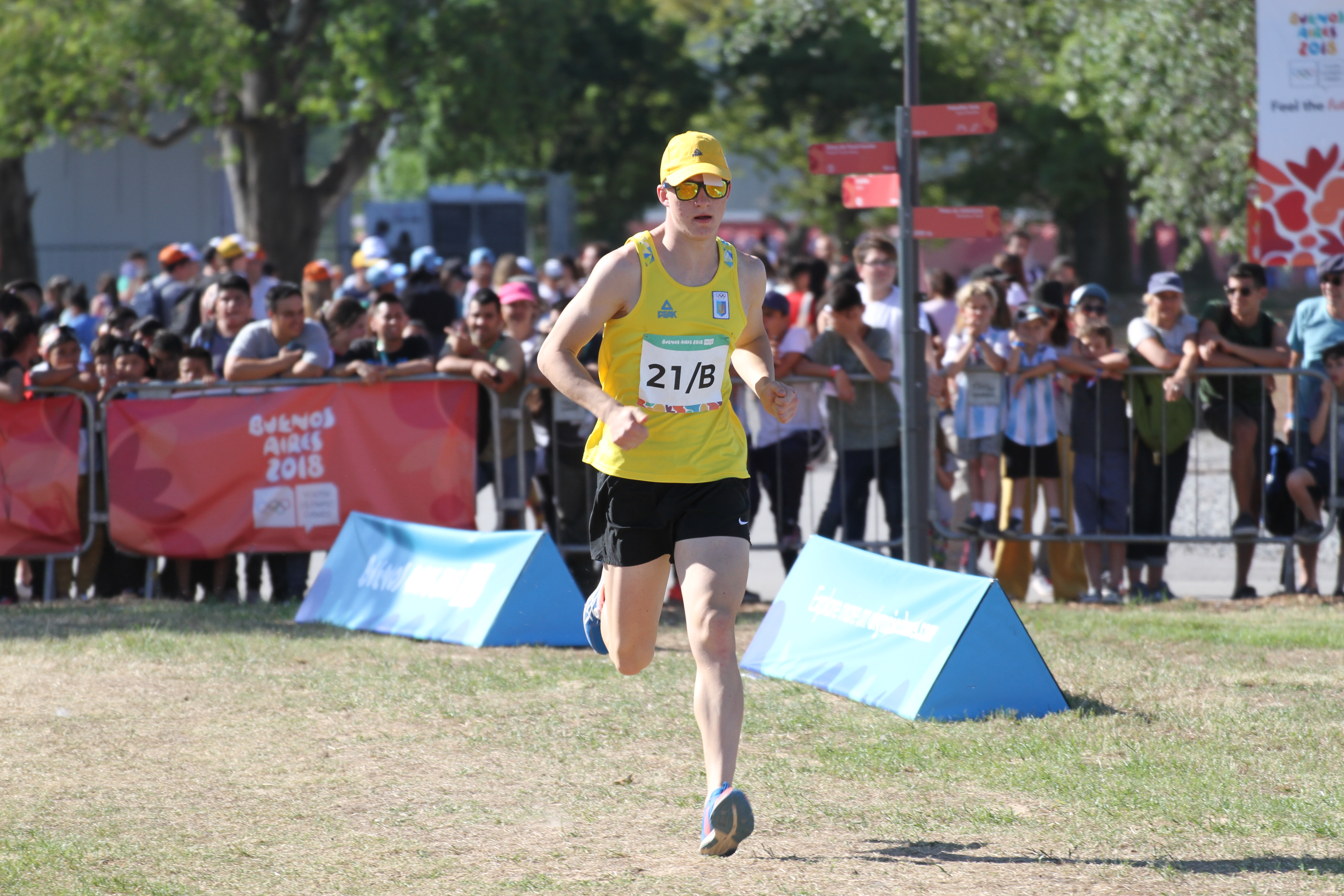
Yevhen Ziborov competing in laser-run during the mixed relay competition

Individual

Athlete	Event	Fencing Ranking Round	Swimming	Fencing Bonus Round	Laser-Run	Total	Rank
Yevhen Ziborov	Boys' individual	250	295	1	560	1106	10

Mixed

Athlete	Event	Fencing Ranking Round	Swimming	Fencing Bonus Round	Laser-Run	Total	Rank
Viktoriia Novikova (RUS); Yevhen Ziborov (UKR)	Mixed relay	170	300	8	560	1038	21

== Rowing ==
Ukraine qualified one boat based on its performance at the 2018 European Rowing Junior Championships.

- Boys' single sculls - 1 boat

Single sculls

Athlete	Event	Time trial		Qualification									Quarterfinals		Finals	
Athlete	Event	Time trial		Heat 2			Heat 3			Total			Quarterfinals		Finals	
Athlete	Event	Time	Rank	Time	Rank	Points	Time	Rank	Points	Time	Points	Rank	Time	Rank	Time	Rank
Ivan Tyshchenko	Boys' single sculls	3:33.37	5	1:45.90	1	6	1:39.11	1	6	3:25.01	12	5 QA/B	1:34.31	1 QA	1:32.47	1st place, gold medalist(s)

== Shooting ==
Ukraine qualified one sport shooter based on its performance at the 2018 European Championships.

- Boys' 10m Air Pistol - 1 quota

Individual

Athlete	Event	Qualification		Final	
Athlete	Event	Points	Rank	Points	Rank
Dmytro Honta	Boys' 10 m air pistol	561-13	12	Did not advance	

Mixed

Athlete	Event	Qualification		Round of 16	Quarterfinal	Semifinal	Final	
Athlete	Event	Points	Rank	Opposition Score	Opposition Score	Opposition Score	Opposition Score	Rank
Andrea Victoria Ibarra Miranda (MEX); Dmytro Honta (UKR)	Mixed 10 metre air pistol	738	16 Q	Mak (SGP); Salavati (IRI); W 10-5	Campostrini (ITA); Zorge (LAT); W 10-8	Bhaker (IND); Fayzullaev (TJK); L 3-10	al-Kaabi (IRQ); Son (BEL); W 10-4	3rd place, bronze medalist(s)

== Sport climbing ==
Boys

Athlete	Event	Qualification									Final								
Athlete	Event	Speed		Boulder		Lead			Total	Rank	Speed		Boulder		Lead			Total	Rank
Athlete	Event	Best	Place	Result	Place	Hold	Time	Place	Total	Rank	Best	Place	Result	Place	Hold	Time	Place	Total	Rank
Yaroslav Tkach	Boys' combined	6.88	2	0T2z 0 19	17	23	—	20	680	11	Did not qualify								

== Swimming ==
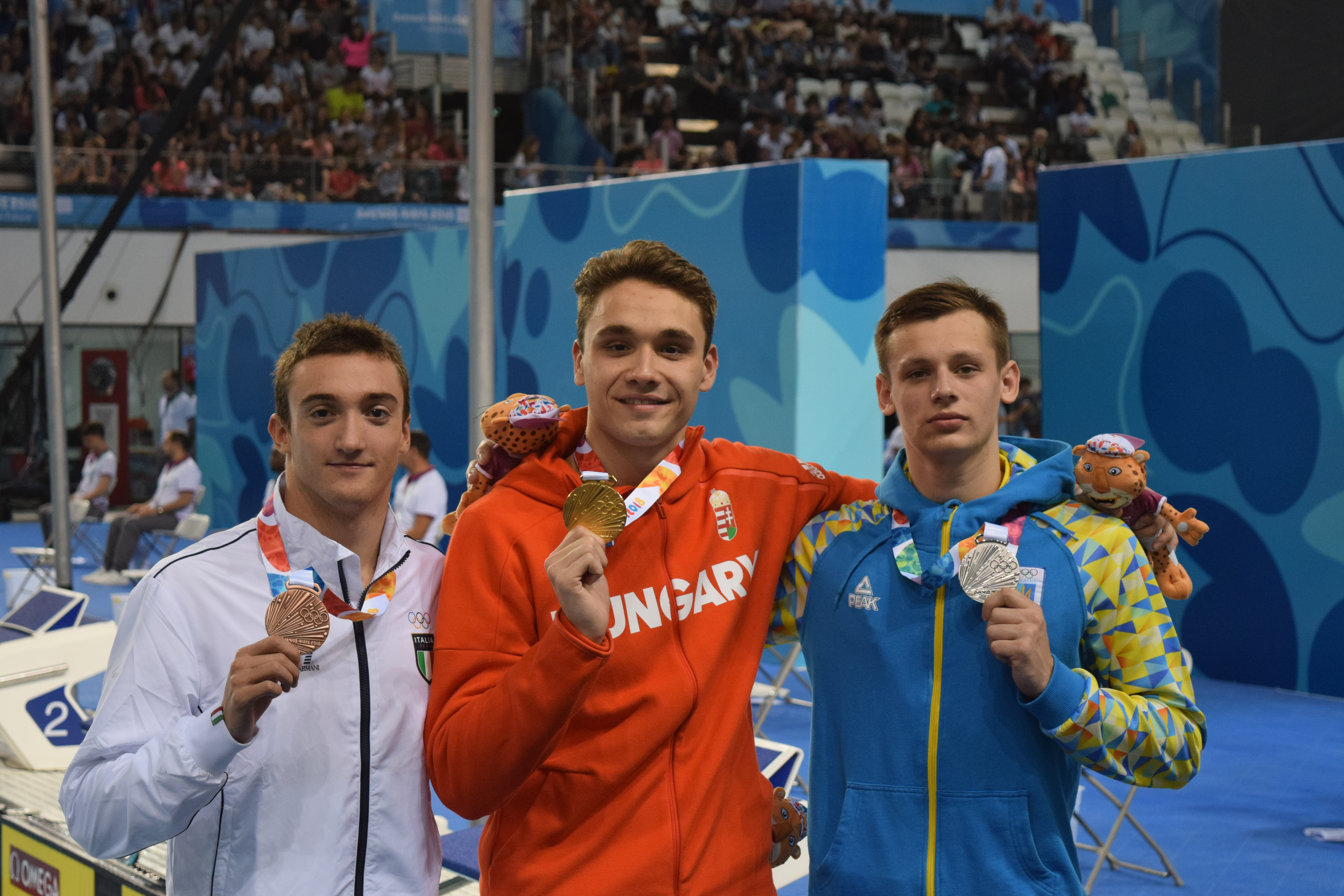
Denys Kesil holding his silver medal

Boys

Athlete	Event	Heat		Semifinal		Swim-off		Final	
Athlete	Event	Time	Rank	Time	Rank	Time	Rank	Time	Rank
Ihor Troianovskyi	50 metre butterfly	24.53	13 Q	24.33	10	—N/a		Did not advance	
Ihor Troianovskyi	100 metre butterfly	53.94	11 Q	52.88	7 Q	—N/a		52.73	5
Ihor Troianovskyi	200 metre butterfly	2:01.80	10	—N/a		—N/a		Did not advance	
Denys Kesil	50 metre butterfly	24.97	20	Did not advance		—N/a		Did not advance	
Denys Kesil	100 metre butterfly	53.69	8 Q	53.47	8 QSO	53.42	2	Did not advance	
Denys Kesil	200 metre butterfly	1:57.70	1 Q	—N/a		—N/a		1:55.89	2nd place, silver medalist(s)

Girls

Athlete	Event	Heat		Semifinal		Final	
Athlete	Event	Time	Rank	Time	Rank	Time	Rank
Maryna Kolesnykova	100 metre backstroke	1:04.27	21	Did not advance			
Maryna Kolesnykova	200 metre backstroke	2:18.92	20	—N/a		Did not advance	
Yuliia Stadnyk	50 metre butterfly	28.15	23	Did not advance			
Yuliia Stadnyk	100 metre butterfly	1:01.01	4 Q	1:01.19	9	Did not advance	
Yuliia Stadnyk	200 metre butterfly	2:16.94	9	—N/a		Did not advance	

== Taekwondo ==
Athlete	Event	Round of 16	Quarterfinals	Semifinals	Final	
Athlete	Event	Opposition Result	Opposition Result	Opposition Result	Opposition Result	Rank
Oleksandr Dziuba	Boys −63 kg	Bye	Nareupong Thepsen (THA); L 26-28	Did not advance		

== Tennis ==
Singles

Athlete	Event	Round of 32	Round of 16	Quarterfinals	Semifinals	Final / BM	Rank
Athlete	Event	Opposition Score	Opposition Score	Opposition Score	Opposition Score	Opposition Score	Rank
Viktoriia Dema	Girls' Singles	Sato (JPN); W 2-0; 6-1, 6-4	Juvan (SLO); L 0-2; 0-6, 0-6	Did not advance			
Margaryta Bilokin	Girls' Singles	Cocciaretto (ITA); L 0-2; 2-6, 4-6	Did not advance				

Doubles

Athletes	Event	Round of 32	Round of 16	Quarterfinals	Semifinals	Final / BM	Rank
Athletes	Event	Opposition Score	Opposition Score	Opposition Score	Opposition Score	Opposition Score	Rank
Margaryta Bilokin (UKR); Viktoriia Dema (UKR)	Girls' Doubles	—N/a	Ivanov (NZL); Naklo (THA); W 2-0; 6-1, 6-3	Naito (JPN); Sato (JPN); L 1-2; 7-5, 5-7, [10]-[8]	Did not advance		
Viktoriia Dema (UKR); Adrian Andreev (BUL)	Mixed Doubles	Sun (SUI); Wenger (SUI); L 0-2; 3-6, 6-7	Did not advance				
Margaryta Bilokin (UKR); Yankı Erel (TUR)	Mixed Doubles	Molinaro (LUX) de Jong (NED); L 0-2; 1-6, 6-7	Did not advance				

== Weightlifting ==
Ukraine qualified two athletes based on its performance at the 2017 World Youth Championships.

- ~~Boys' events - 1 quota~~
- ~~Girls' events - 1 quota~~

On 30 September 2017, Ukraine was handed a one-year ban from the IWF for doping violations which was in effect til mid-October. Therefore, Ukrainian athletes were unable to compete in Buenos Aires.

== Wrestling ==
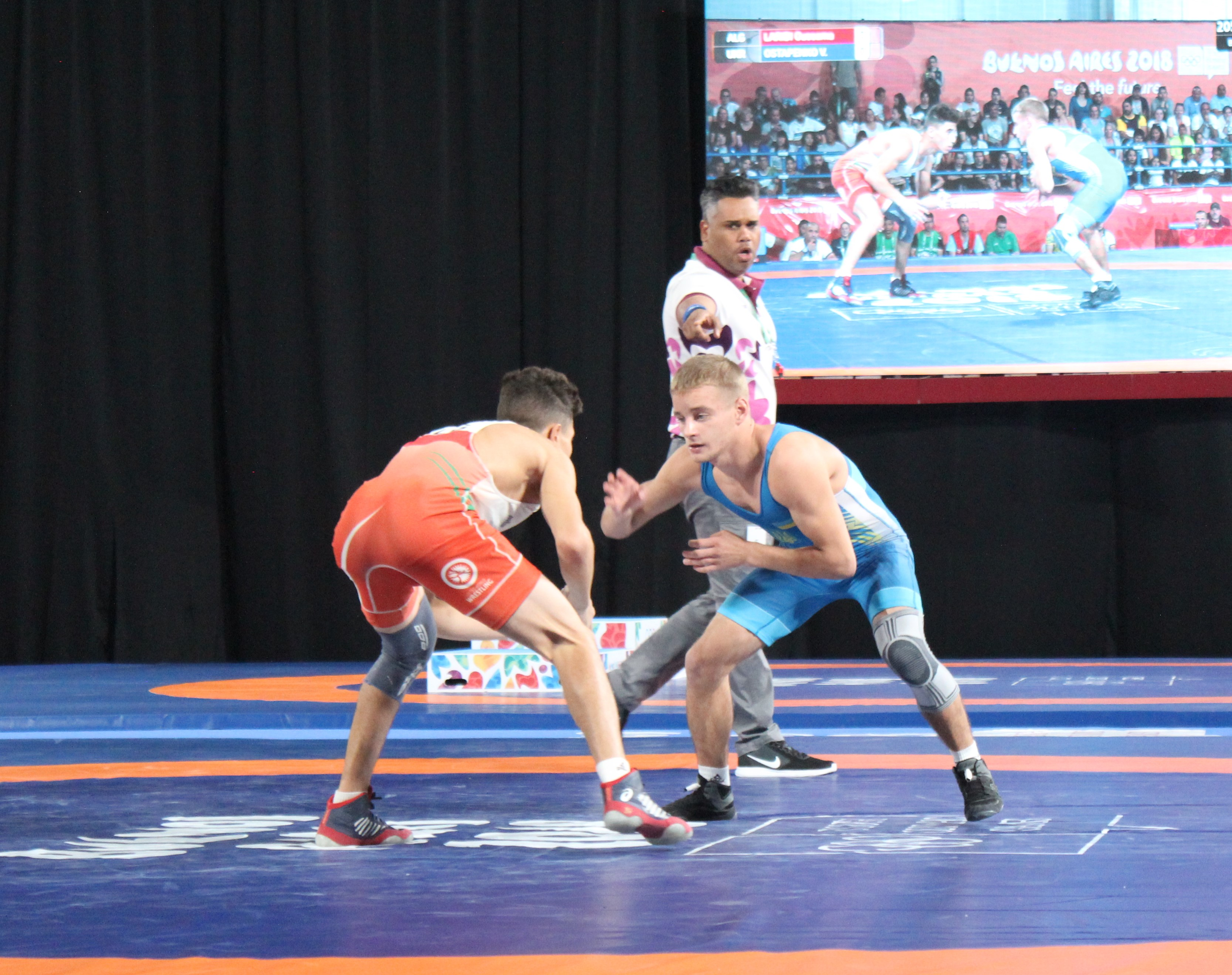
Bronze medal bout between Oussama Laribi and Vladyslav Ostapenko

Key:
- VFA – Victory by Fall
- VSU – Without any points scored by the opponent
- VSU1 – With point(s) scored by the opponent
- VPO – Without any points scored by the opponent
- VPO1 – With point(s) scored by the opponent

Athlete	Event	Group stage					Final / RM	Rank
Athlete	Event	Opposition Score	Opposition Score	Opposition Score	Opposition Score	Rank	Opposition Score	Rank
Vladyslav Ostapenko	Boys' freestyle −55kg	Fujita (JPN); W 10 – 4 ^{VPO1}	Howard (USA); L 5 – 10 ^{VPO1}	—N/a		2 Q	Laribi (ALG); W 10 – 0 ^{VSU}	3rd place, bronze medalist(s)
Oksana Chudyk	Girls' freestyle −65kg	Nabaina (CMR); W 10 – 3 ^{VPO1}	Balogun (NGR); W 2 – 1 ^{VPO1}	Sghaier (TUN); W 10 – 0 ^{VSU}	Vesso (EST); W 1 – 1 ^{VPO1}	1 Q	Zhou (CHN); L 0 – 10 ^{VSU}	2nd place, silver medalist(s)
