= Shen Jiahao =

Chinese swimmer

Personal information
- Nationality: Chinese
- Born: 17 May 2001 (age 25)

Sport
- Sport: Swimming

Shen Jiahao (born 17 May 2001) is a Chinese swimmer. He competed in the men's 100 metre butterfly event at the 2018 FINA World Swimming Championships (25 m), in Hangzhou, China.
