= Shooting at the 2018 Summer Youth Olympics =

Shooting at the III Summer Youth Olympic Games
- Venue: Parque Sarmiento
- Dates: 7–12 October
- No. of events: 6 (2 boys, 2 girls, 2 mixed)

Shooting at the 2018 Summer Youth Olympics was held from 7 to 12 October. The events took place at the Parque Sarmiento in Buenos Aires, Argentina.

== Qualification ==
Each National Olympic Committee (NOC) can enter a maximum of 4 athletes, 1 per each event. As hosts, Argentina is given a spot to compete in boys’ 10 m air pistol and girls’ 10 m air rifle events, however they declined to compete in air pistol. A further 24, six per each event will be decided by the Tripartite Commission, though only five were allocated, the remaining will be given out as wild cards. The remaining 54 places shall be decided by qualification events, namely continental qualification tournaments.

To be eligible to participate at the Youth Olympics athletes must have been born between 1 January 2000 and 31 December 2003. Furthermore, all shooters (including hosts and tripartite invitations) must have achieved the following Minimum Qualification Score (MQS).

- Boys 10 m Air Rifle: 60 Shots, Score of 552 / 580.0
- Boys 10 m Air Pistol: 60 Shots, Score of 540
- Girls 10 m Air Rifle: 40 Shots, Score of 368 / 385.0
- Girls 10 m Air Pistol: 40 Shots, Score of 355

The MQS must be achieved between 1 April 2017 and 23 July 2018 at an ISSF registered event.

=== Summary ===
Nation	Men		Women		Athletes
Nation	Rifle	Pistol	Rifle	Pistol	Athletes
Argentina	X		X		2
Armenia	X				1
Australia	X		X	X	3
Austria	X				1
Bangladesh	X		X		2
Belarus		X			1
Belgium		X			1
Bosnia and Herzegovina	X				1
Bulgaria	X	X			2
Canada		X			1
Chile			X		1
China	X		X	X	3
Colombia				X	1
Croatia				X	1
Czech Republic		X			1
Denmark			X		1
Egypt		X	X		2
Finland			X		1
France				X	1
Georgia				X	1
Germany	X	X	X	X	4
Great Britain		X			1
Hungary	X				1
India	X	X	X	X	4
Indonesia	X				1
Iran	X	X			2
Iraq				X	1
Italy			X	X	2
Japan			X		1
Kazakhstan		X			1
Latvia		X			1
Lithuania				X	1
Mexico	X	X	X	X	4
Moldova		X			1
Mongolia			X		1
Montenegro	X				1
Pakistan				X	1
Peru	X				1
Poland			X		1
Romania				X	1
Russia	X		X	X	3
Serbia	X		X		2
Singapore				X	1
Slovenia				X	1
Slovakia		X			1
South Africa	X				1
South Korea		X			1
Spain				X	1
Sri Lanka	X				1
Switzerland		X			1
Chinese Taipei			X		1
Tajikistan		X			1
Thailand				X	1
Tunisia				X	1
Turkey		X			1
United Arab Emirates			X		1
Ukraine		X			1
Uzbekistan			X		1
Total: 58 NOCs	20	20	20	20	80

=== 10m Air Rifle ===
Event	Location	Date	Total Places	Qualified Boys	Qualified Girls
Host Nation	-	-	0 | 1	-	Argentina
2017 African Championship	(Egypt) Cairo	19 Apr–3 May 2017	1	South Africa	Egypt
2017 European Championship	(Azerbaijan) Baku	21 Jul–4 Aug 2017	3	Hungary; Russia; Serbia	Finland; Germany; Serbia
Oceania Qualification Tournament	(Australia) Gold Coast	27–30 October 2017	1	Australia	Australia
2017 Asian Championship (10m)	(Japan) Wako City	6–12 December 2017	4 | 3	Bangladesh; China; India; Iran	China; Chinese Taipei; India
2018 European Championship (10m)	(Hungary) Győr	16–26 February 2018	3	Germany; Bulgaria; Armenia	Russia; Italy; Poland
American Qualification Tournament	(United States) Fort Benning	14 May 2018	2	Mexico; Argentina	Mexico; Chile
Tripartite Invitation	-	-	6	Bosnia and Herzegovina	Bangladesh; United Arab Emirates
Reallocation	-	-	6	Austria; Indonesia; Montenegro; Peru; Sri Lanka	Denmark; Japan; Mongolia; Uzbekistan
TOTAL				20	20

=== 10m Air Pistol ===
Event	Location	Date	Total Places	Qualified Boys	Qualified Girls
Host Nation	-	-	0	~~Argentina~~	-
2017 African Championship	(Egypt) Cairo	19 Apr–3 May 2017	1	Egypt	Tunisia
2017 European Championship	(Azerbaijan) Baku	21 Jul–4 Aug 2017	3	Belarus; Bulgaria; Germany	France; Italy; Russia
Oceania Qualification Tournament	(Australia) Gold Coast	27–30 October 2017	1	Reallocated*	Australia
2017 Asian Championship (10m)	(Japan) Wako City	6–12 December 2017	3 | 4	India; Iran; South Korea	China; India; Singapore; Thailand
2018 European Championship (10m)	(Hungary) Győr	16–26 February 2018	3	Switzerland; Ukraine; Czech Republic	Spain; Germany; Georgia
American Qualification Tournament	(United States) Fort Benning	14 May 2018	2	Mexico; Canada	Mexico; Colombia
Tripartite Invitation	-	-	6		Iraq; Pakistan
Reallocation	-	-	6	Belgium; Great Britain; Kazakhstan; Latvia; Moldova; Slovakia; Tajikistan; Turkey	Croatia; Lithuania; Romania; Slovenia
TOTAL				20	20

- * The quota was reallocated due to no athlete reaching the MQS. It will be given out as a wild card.

== Medal summary ==
=== Medal table ===
Rank	Nation	Gold	Silver	Bronze	Total
–	Mixed-NOCs	2	2	2	6
1	India	2	2	0	4
2	Russia	1	1	0	2
3	Denmark	1	0	0	1
4	South Korea	0	1	0	1
5	Serbia	0	0	2	2
6	Georgia	0	0	1	1
6	Switzerland	0	0	1	1
Totals (7 entries)		6	6	6	18

- India were the most successful country in the sports discipline of shooting in 2018 Summer Youth Olympics, as they won a medal in every shooting disciplines they participated. They won a total of 4 medals including 2 golds and 2 silvers.

=== 10m Air Rifle ===
Event	Gold	Silver	Bronze
Boys' 10m Air Rifle	Grigorii Shamakov; Russia	Shahu Tushar Mane; India	Aleksa Mitrović; Serbia
Girls' 10m Air Rifle	Stephanie Grundsøe; Denmark	Mehuli Ghosh; India	Marija Malić; Serbia
Mixed Teams' 10m Air Rifle	Enkhmaa Erdenechuluun; Zalán Pekler; Mixed-NOCs	Anastasiia Dereviagina; Edson Ramírez; Mixed-NOCs	Viivi Natalia Kemppi; Facundo Firmapaz; Mixed-NOCs

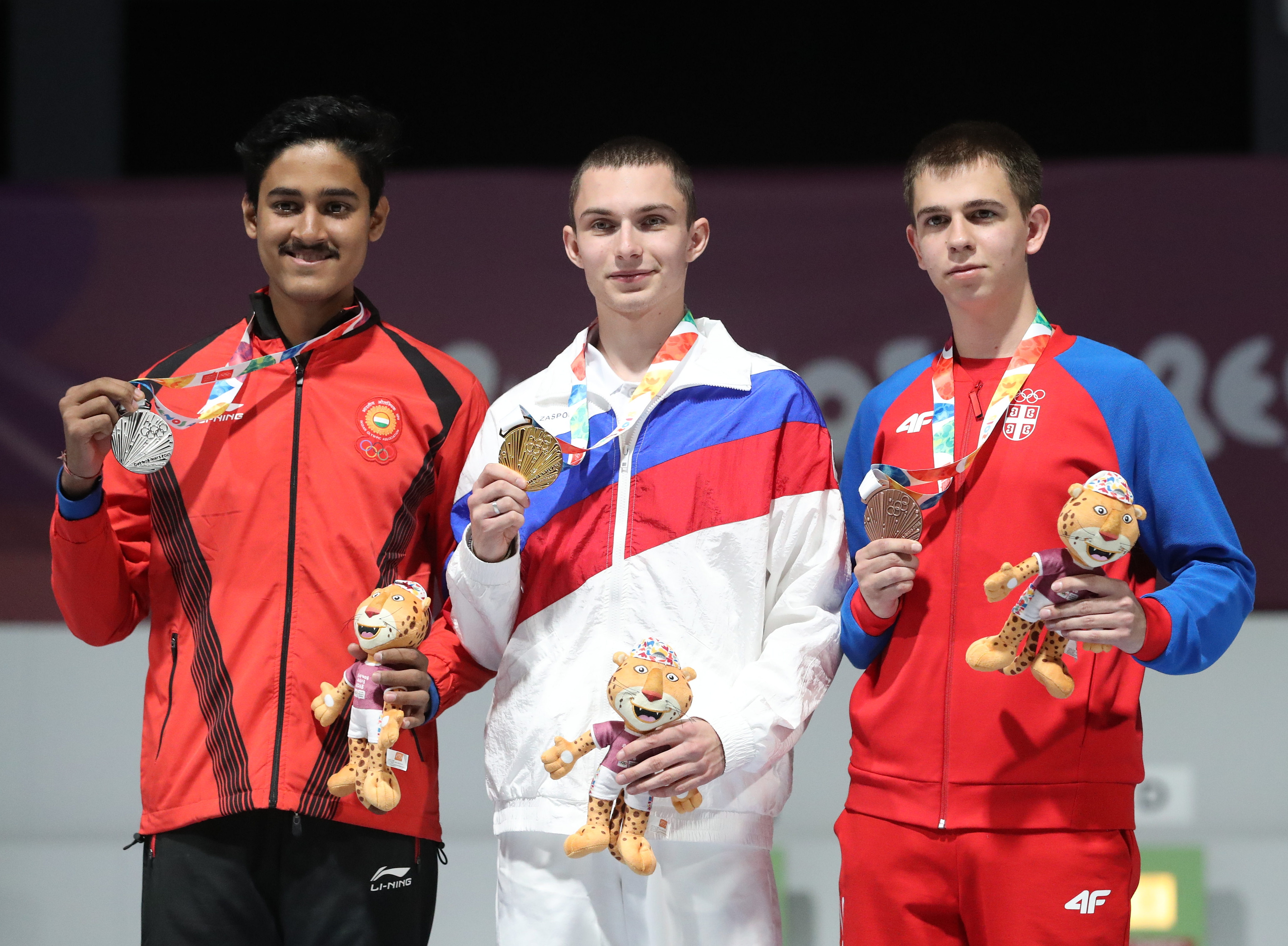
Boys' 10 metre air rifle victory ceremony

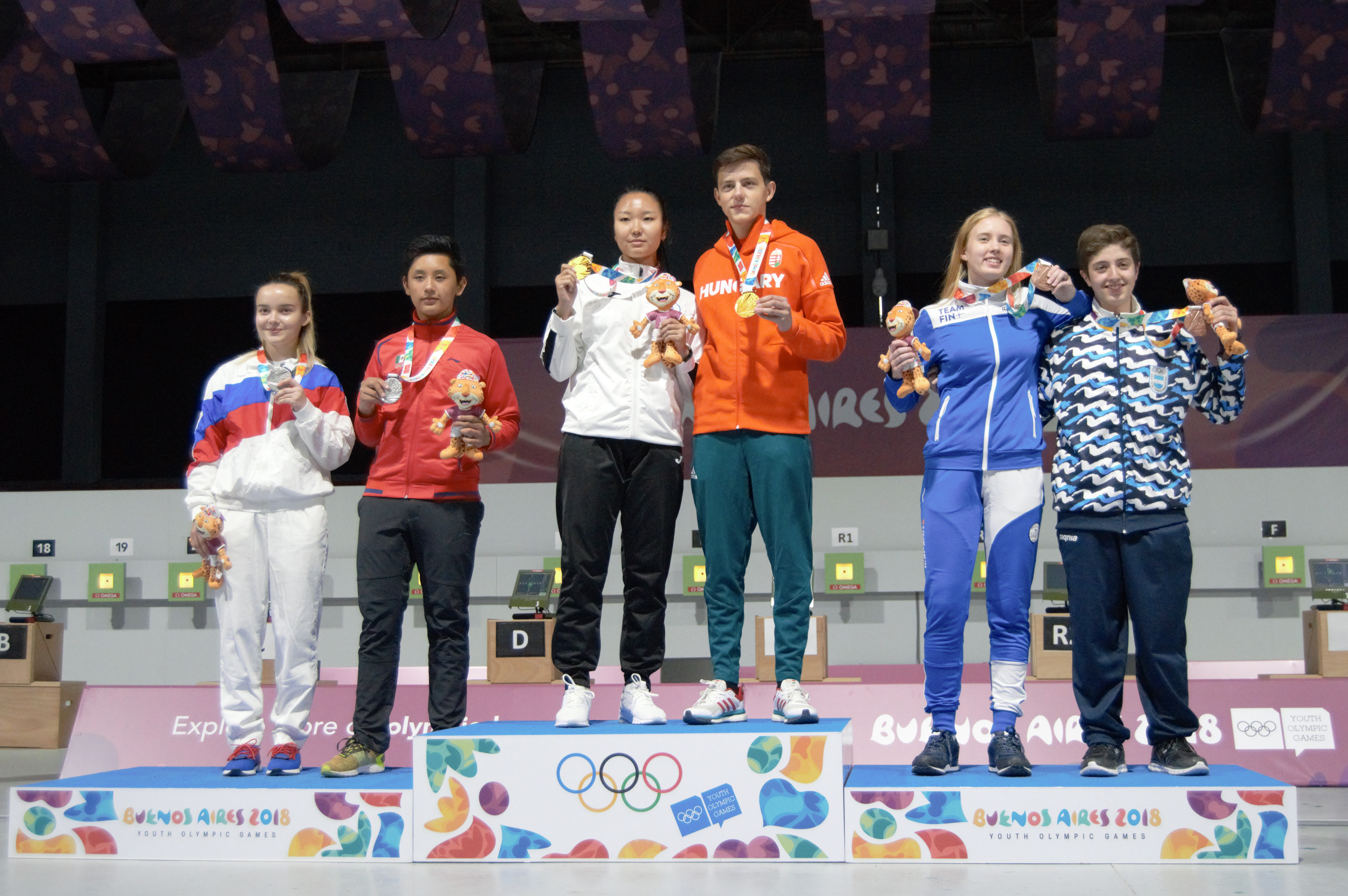
Mixed Teams' 10 metre air rifle victory ceremony

=== 10m Air Pistol ===
Event	Gold	Silver	Bronze
Boys' 10m Air Pistol	Saurabh Chaudhary; India	Yun Sung-ho; South Korea	Jason Solari; Switzerland
Girls' 10m Air Pistol	Manu Bhaker; India	Iana Enina; Russia	Nino Khutsiberidze; Georgia
Mixed Teams' 10m Air Pistol	Vanessa Seeger (GER); Kiril Kirov (BUL); Mixed-NOCs	Manu Bhaker (IND); Bezhan Fayzullaev (TJK); Mixed-NOCs	Andrea Ibarra (MEX); Dmytro Honta (UKR); Mixed-NOCs
