= Shooting at the 2018 Summer Youth Olympics – Mixed 10 metre air pistol =

Mixed 10 metre air pistol at the III Summer Youth Olympic Games
- Venue: Parque Sarmiento
- Dates: 11–12 October
- Competitors: 40 from 37 nations

Medalists
1st place, gold medalist(s)		Vanessa Seeger; Kiril Kirov	Mixed-NOCs
2nd place, silver medalist(s)		Manu Bhaker; Bezhan Fayzullaev	Mixed-NOCs
3rd place, bronze medalist(s)		Andrea Ibarra; Dmytro Honta	Mixed-NOCs

These are the results for the mixed 10 metre air pistol event at the 2018 Summer Youth Olympics.

== Results ==
=== Qualification ===
Rank	Athlete	Points	Notes
1	Amanda Mak (SGP); Erfan Salavati (IRI)	755-16x	Q
2	Marijana Matea Štrbac (CRO); Abdul-Aziz Kurdzi (BLR)	754-21x	Q
3	Vanessa Seeger (GER); Kiril Kirov (BUL)	754-18x	Q
4	Greta Rankelytė (LTU); Kirill Ușanlî (MDA)	752-23x	Q
5	Manu Bhaker (IND); Bezhan Fayzullaev (TJK)	751-21x	Q
6	Juana Rueda (COL); Jan Luca Karstedt (GER)	750-20x	Q
7	Olivia Erickson (AUS); Pavel Schejbal (CZE)	749-12x	Q
8	Giulia Campostrini (ITA); Rihards Zorge (LAT)	746-12x	Q
9	Daria-Olimpia Haristiade (ROU); Jason Solari (SUI)	744-16x	Q
10	Fatimah Al-Kaabi (IRQ); Jerome Son (BEL)	741-15x	Q
11	Nino Khutsiberidze (GEO); Brian Ng (CAN)	740-17x	Q
12	Kanyakorn Hirunphoem (THA); Omar Abdelfatah (EGY)	740-16x	Q
13	Lu Kaiman (CHN); Jerguš Vengríni (SVK)	739-15x	Q
14	Kateline Nicolas (FRA); James Miller (GBR)	739-12x	Q
15	Nubaira Babur (PAK); Saurabh Chaudhary (IND)	738-18x	Q
16	Andrea Ibarra (MEX); Dmytro Honta (UKR)	738-10x	Q
17	Gloria Fernández (ESP); Eldar Imankulov (KAZ)	737-13x	
18	Anja Prezelj (SLO); Alp Eren Erdur (TUR)	733-9x	
19	Iana Enina (RUS); Sebastian Hernández (MEX)	728-12x	
20	Doua Chalghoum (TUN); Sung Yun-ho (KOR)	720-7x	

=== Draw ===
First round
1	Mak (SGP); Salavati (IRI)	5
16	Ibarra (MEX); Honta (UKR)	10
9	Haristiade (ROU); Solari (SUI)	6
8	Campostrini (ITA); Zorge (LAT)	10
4	Rankelytė (LTU); Ușanlî (MDA)	10
13	Lu (CHN); Vengríni (SVK)	7
12	Hirunphoem (THA); Abdelfatah (EGY)	4
5	Bhaker (IND); Fayzullaev (TJK)	10
11	Khutsiberidze (GEO); Ng (CAN)	7
6	Rueda (COL); Karstedt (GER)	10
14	Nicolas (FRA); Miller (GBR)	5
3	Seeger (GER); Kirov (BUL)	10
7	Erickson (AUS); Schejbal (CZE)	9
10	Al-Kaabi (IRQ); Son (BEL)	10
15	Babur (PAK); Chaudhary (IND)	3
2	Štrbac (CRO); Kurdzi (BLR)	10

Quarter-finals
16	Ibarra (MEX); Honta (UKR)	10
8	Campostrini (ITA); Zorge (LAT)	8
4	Rankelytė (LTU); Ușanlî (MDA)	8
5	Bhaker (IND); Fayzullaev (TJK)	10
6	Rueda (COL); Karstedt (GER)	5
3	Seeger (GER); Kirov (BUL)	10
10	Al-Kaabi (IRQ); Son (BEL)	10
2	Štrbac (CRO); Kurdzi (BLR)	5

Semi-finals
16	Ibarra (MEX); Honta (UKR)	3
5	Bhaker (IND); Fayzullaev (TJK)	10
3	Seeger (GER); Kirov (BUL)	10
10	Al-Kaabi (IRQ); Son (BEL)	6

Final
5	Bhaker (IND); Fayzullaev (TJK)	3
3	Seeger (GER); Kirov (BUL)	10
Bronze medal match
16	Ibarra (MEX); Honta (UKR)	10
10	Al-Kaabi (IRQ); Son (BEL)	4

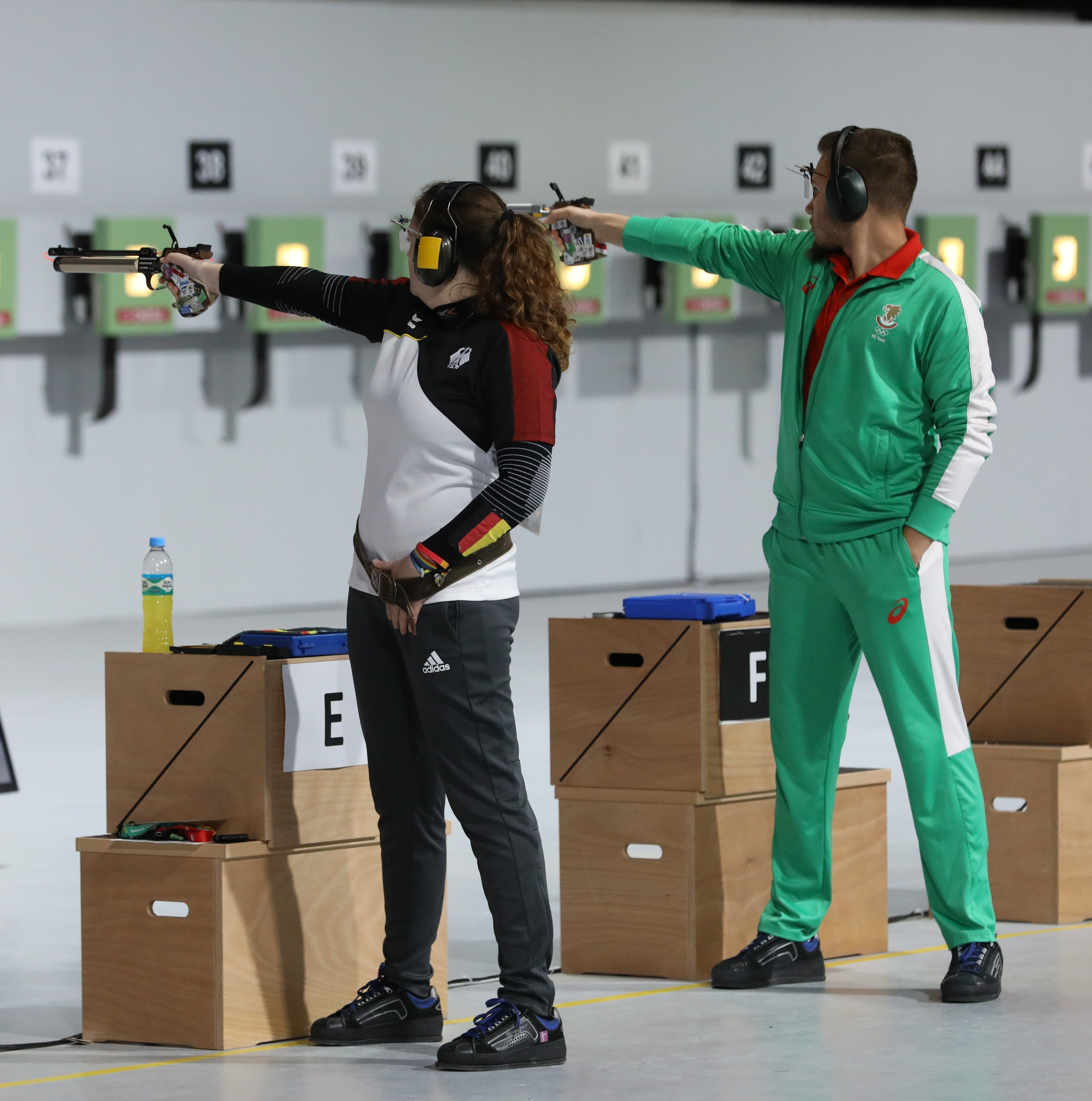
Vanessa Seeger and Kiril Kirov, gold medal

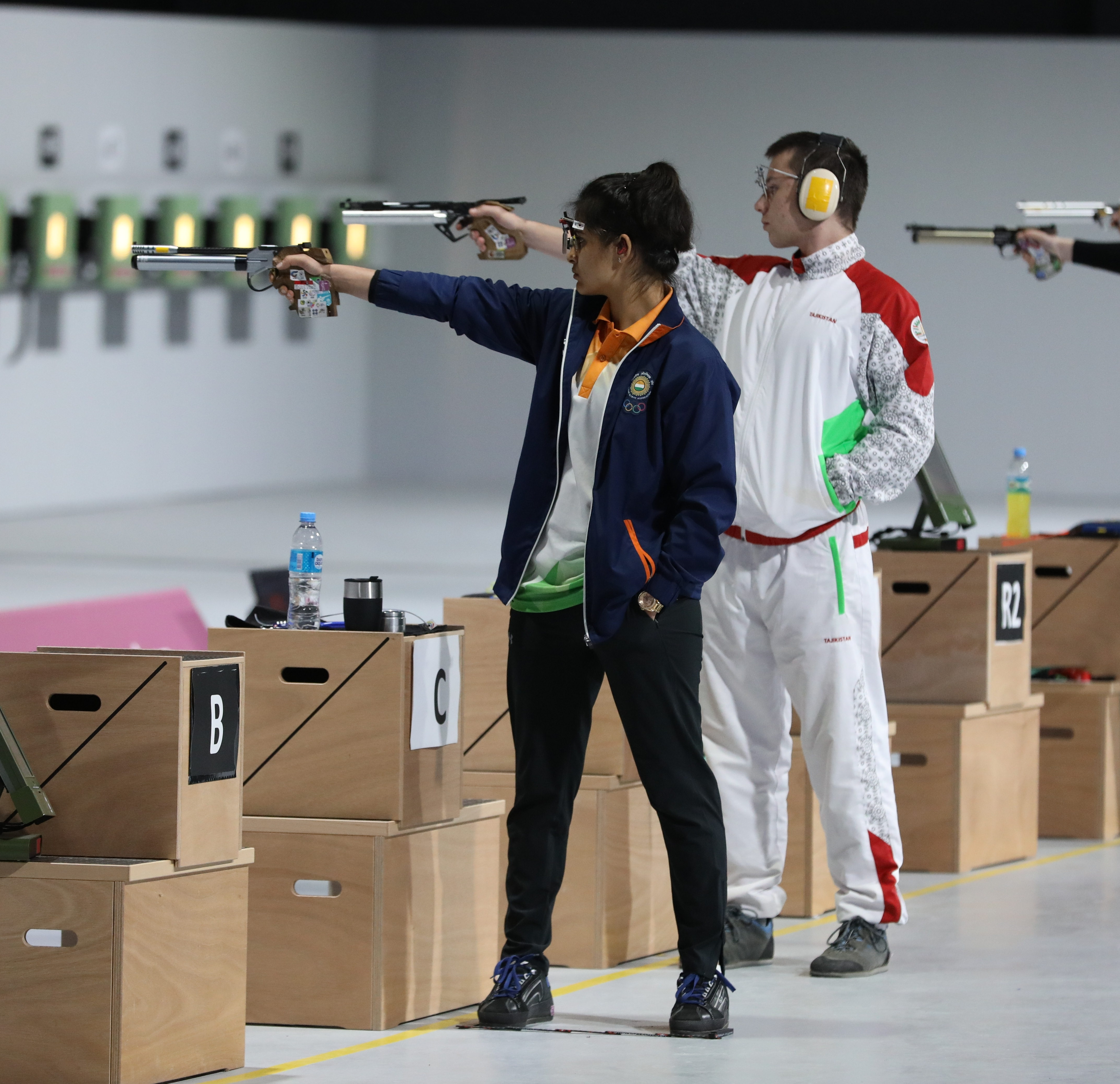
Manu Bhaker and Bezhan Fayzullaev, silver medal

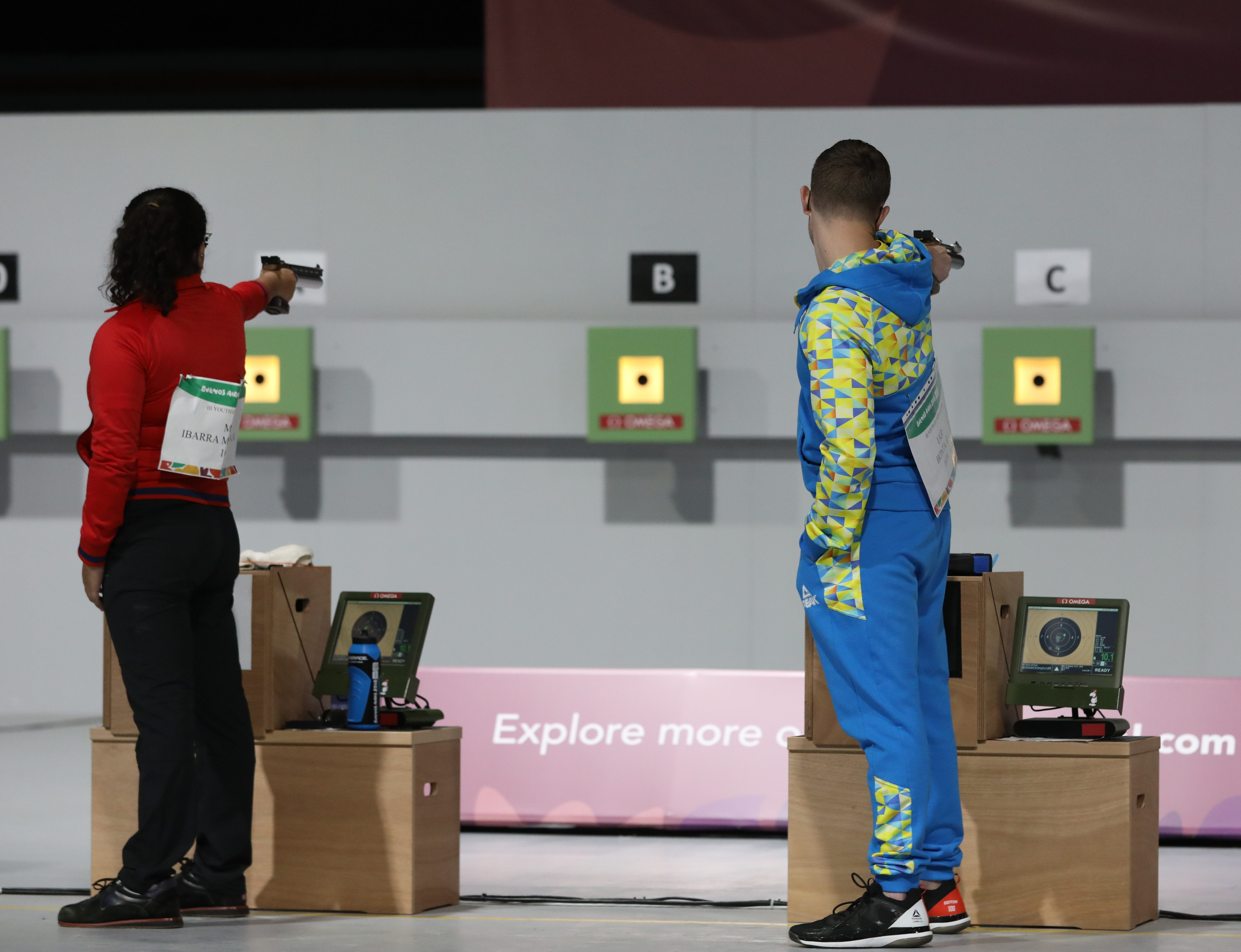
Andrea Ibarra and Dmytro Honta, bronze medal

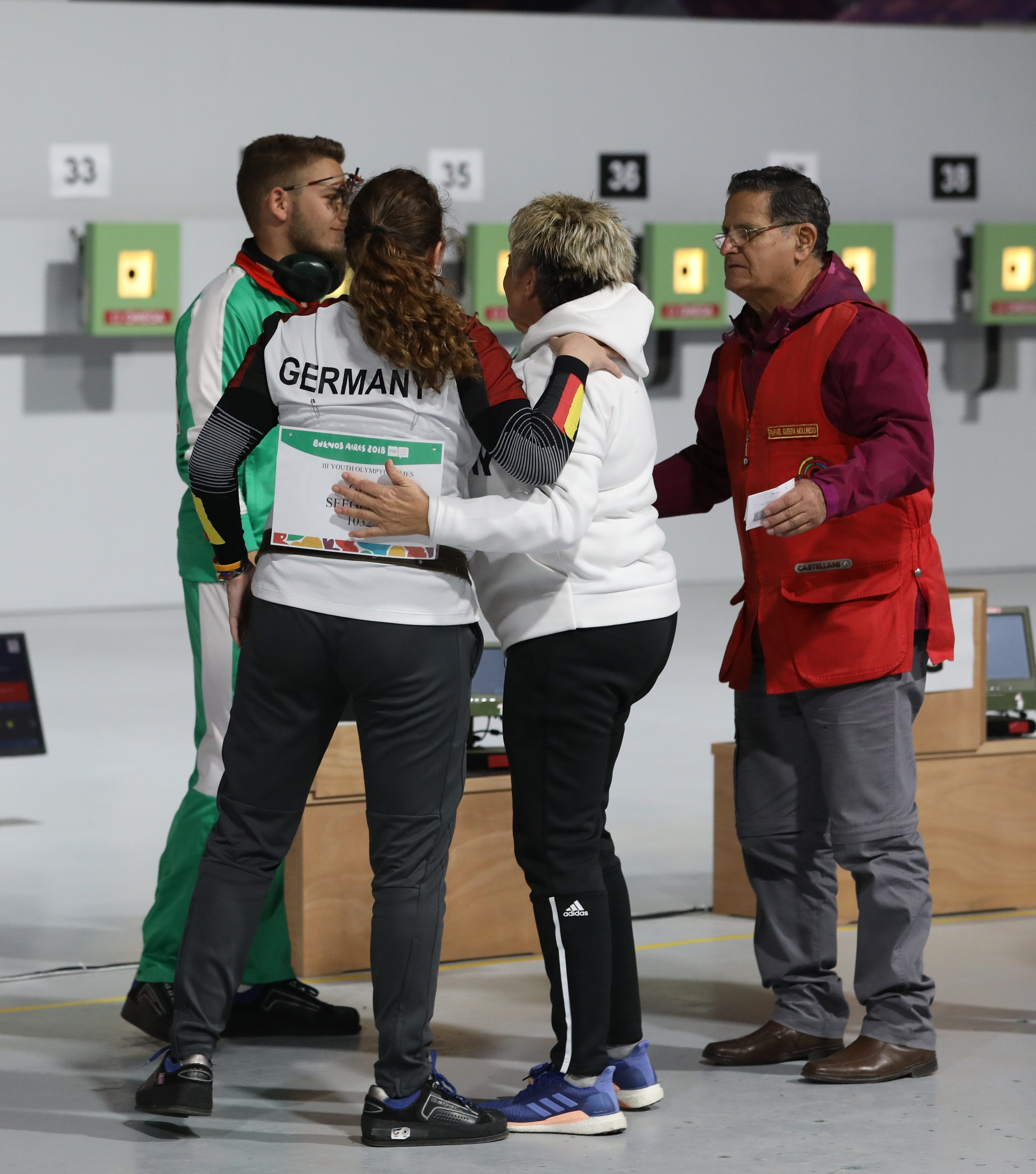
Vanessa Seeger and Kiril Kirov, celebrating their victory

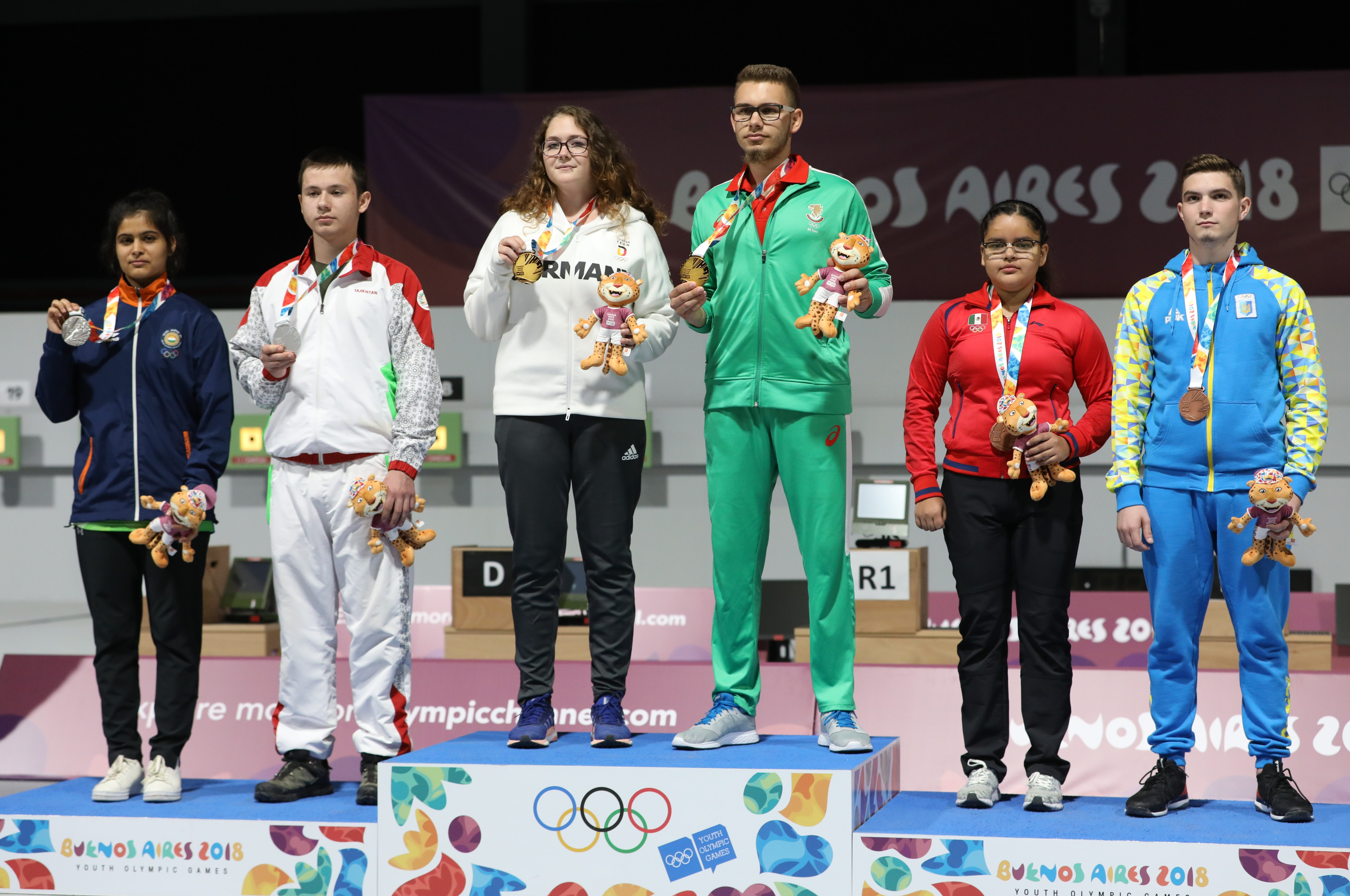
Victory ceremony
