= Belarus at the 2018 Summer Youth Olympics =

- IOC code: BLR
- NOC: Belarus Olympic Committee
- Website: http://www.noc.by/en/

in Buenos Aires, Argentina 6 – 18 October 2018
- Competitors: 37 in 13 sports
- Flag bearer: Ivan Brynza
- Medals Ranked 47th: Gold 1 Silver 3 Bronze 3 Total 7

Summer Youth Olympics appearances (overview)
- 2010; 2014; 2018

Belarus participated at the 2018 Summer Youth Olympics in Buenos Aires, Argentina from 6 October to 18 October 2018.

== Medalists ==
Medals awarded to participants of mixed-NOC teams are represented in italics. These medals are not counted towards the individual NOC medal tally.

Medal	Name	Sport	Event	Date
Gold	Artsiom Kolasau	Judo	Boys' 55 kg	7 October
Gold	Artsiom Kolasau	Judo	Mixed team	10 October
Silver	Ivan Brynza	Rowing	Boys' single sculls	10 October
Silver	Anastasiya Shkurdai	Swimming	Girls' 50 m butterfly	10 October
Silver	Yelizaveta Dorts	Athletics	Girls' shot put	15 October
Bronze	Viktoryia Akhotnikava; Ilya Famenkou	Gymnastics	Mixed multi-discipline team	10 October
Bronze	Anastasiya Shkurdai	Swimming	Girls' 100 m butterfly	12 October
Bronze	Natallia Varakina	Wrestling	Girls' freestyle 49 kg	13 October
Bronze	Krystsina Kantsavenka	Athletics	Girls' pole vault	14 October

Medals by sport
Sport	1st place, gold medalist(s)	2nd place, silver medalist(s)	3rd place, bronze medalist(s)	Total
Athletics	0	1	1	2
Judo	1	0	0	1
Rowing	0	1	0	1
Swimming	0	1	1	2
Wrestling	0	0	1	1
Total	1	3	3	7

== Competitors ==
Sport	Boys	Girls	Total
Archery	0	1	1
Athletics	5	11	16
Canoeing	0	1	1
Gymnastics	2	3	5
Judo	1	0	1
Modern pentathlon	1	1	2
Rowing	1	0	1
Sailing	0	1	1
Shooting	1	0	1
Swimming	2	2	4
Table tennis	0	1	1
Tennis	0	1	1
Wrestling	0	2	2
Total	13	24	37

== Archery ==
Belarus qualified one archer based on its performance at the 2018 European Youth Championships.

Individual

Athlete	Event	Ranking round		Round of 32	Round of 16	Quarterfinals	Semifinals	Final / BM	Rank
Athlete	Event	Score	Seed	Opposition Score	Opposition Score	Opposition Score	Opposition Score	Opposition Score	Rank
Liliya Trydvornava	Girls' Individual	619	27	Reisenweber (GER); L 0–6	did not advance				17

Team

Athletes	Event	Ranking round		Round of 32	Round of 16	Quarterfinals	Semifinals	Final / BM	Rank
Athletes	Event	Score	Seed	Opposition Score	Opposition Score	Opposition Score	Opposition Score	Opposition Score	Rank
Liliya Trydvornava (BLR); Artem Ovchynnikov (UKR)	Mixed team	1298	23	Gatco (MDA); Hurnall (AUS); W 5–3	Kang (PRK); Vaca Cordero (MEX); L 1–5	did not advance			9

== Athletics ==
Boys
Field events

Athlete	Event	Stage 1		Stage 2		Total	
Athlete	Event	Distance	Rank	Distance	Rank	Distance	Rank
Kirill Sots	Long jump	7.03	10	7.23	6	14.26	7
Yahor Chuiko	Triple jump	15.46	4	15.96	2	31.42	4
Aliaksei Aleksandrovich	Shot put	21.22	2	20.02	4	41.24	4
Roman Khartanovich	Discus throw	52.78	9	57.27	7	110.05	10
Aliaksei Yiakimovich	Hammer throw	69.71	11	DNS			

Girls
Track events

Athlete	Event	Stage 1		Stage 2		Total	
Athlete	Event	Result	Rank	Result	Rank	Total	Rank
Alina Luchsheva	400 m	55.93	5	55.97	9	1:51.90	6
Liudmila Rudzko	800 m	2:12.65	12	2:12.23	11	4:24.88	10
Anastasiya Paluyan	1500 m	4:37.27	12	14:35	12	24	12
Viktoryia Kharavitskaya	100 m hurdles	14.39	14	14.01	11	28.40	13
Hanna Zubkova	5000 m walk	DQ		24:01.70	5		

Field events

Athlete	Event	Stage 1		Stage 2		Total	
Athlete	Event	Distance	Rank	Distance	Rank	Distance	Rank
Palina Talankova	Triple jump	12.00	14	NM		12.00	14
Krystsina Kantsavenka	Pole vault	3.75	4	3.97	2	7.72	3rd place, bronze medalist(s)
Yelizaveta Dorts	Shot put	17.60	2	17.53	2	35.13	2nd place, silver medalist(s)
Ulada Zhavarankava	Discus throw	46.18	9	47.46	6	93.64	9
Aliaksandra Konshina	Javelin throw	55.06	4	55.20	5	110.26	5
Mariola Bukel	Hammer throw	64.18	5	60.21	6	124.39	6

== Canoeing ==
Girls

Athlete	Event	Qualification		Repechage		Round of 16	Quarterfinals	Semifinals	Final / BM	Rank
Athlete	Event	Time	Rank	Time	Rank	Opposition Result	Opposition Result	Opposition Result	Opposition Result	Rank
Darya Marusava	C1 sprint	2:24.92	7 Q	Bye		Delassus (FRA); W 2:20.07	Fayzieva (UZB); L 2:21.34	did not advance		
Darya Marusava	C1 slalom	1:46.69	14 R	1:44.44	5 Q	Bello (NGR); L DNF	did not advance			

== Gymnastics ==
=== Acrobatic ===
Belarus qualified a mixed pair based on its performance at the 2018 Acrobatic Gymnastics World Championship.

Athlete	Event	Qualification					Final	
Athlete	Event	Balance	Dynamic	Combined	Total	Rank	Total	Rank
Viktoryia Akhotnikava; Ilya Famenkou	Mixed pairs	27.350	27.040	26.600	80.990	5 Q	27.200	5

=== Artistic ===
Belarus qualified one gymnast based on its performance at the 2018 European Junior Championship.

Girls

Athlete	Event	Apparatus				Total	Rank
Athlete	Event	V	UB	BB	F	Total	Rank
Aliaksandra Varabyova	Qualification	12.566	9.966	12.033	12.166	46.731	20

=== Rhythmic ===
Belarus qualified one rhythmic gymnast based on its performance at the European qualification event.

Athlete	Event	Qualification						Final					
Athlete	Event	Hoop	Ball	Clubs	Ribbon	Total	Rank	Hoop	Ball	Clubs	Ribbon	Total	Rank
Anna Kamenshchikova	All-around	16.400	12.800	15.350	12.900	57.450	8 Q	16.450	16.350	16.000	14.800	63.600	4

=== Trampoline ===
Belarus qualified one gymnast based on its performance at the 2018 European Junior Championship.

Athlete	Event	Qualification				Final	
Athlete	Event	Routine 1	Routine 2	Total	Rank	Score	Rank
Ivan Litvinovich	Boys	48.345	60.010	108.355	1 Q	57.150	4

=== Multidiscipline ===
Team	Athlete	Acrobatic	Artistic	Rhythmic	Trampoline	Total points	Rank
Team Oksana Chusovitina (Black)	Viktoryia Akhotnikava (BLR); Ilya Famenkou (BLR)	12	—N/a			352	3rd place, bronze medalist(s)
Team Oksana Chusovitina (Black)	Brandon Briones (USA)	—N/a	32	—N/a		352	3rd place, bronze medalist(s)
Team Oksana Chusovitina (Black)	Adam Tobin (GBR)	—N/a	45	—N/a		352	3rd place, bronze medalist(s)
Team Oksana Chusovitina (Black)	Mohamed Afify (EGY)	—N/a	–	—N/a		352	3rd place, bronze medalist(s)
Team Oksana Chusovitina (Black)	Indira Ulmasova (UZB)	—N/a	52	—N/a		352	3rd place, bronze medalist(s)
Team Oksana Chusovitina (Black)	Karla Pérez (GUA)	—N/a	35	—N/a		352	3rd place, bronze medalist(s)
Team Oksana Chusovitina (Black)	Tonya Paulsson (SWE)	—N/a	38	—N/a		352	3rd place, bronze medalist(s)
Team Oksana Chusovitina (Black)	Lidiia Iakovleva (AUS)	—N/a		35	—N/a	352	3rd place, bronze medalist(s)
Team Oksana Chusovitina (Black)	Aino Yamada (JPN)	—N/a		31	—N/a	352	3rd place, bronze medalist(s)
Team Oksana Chusovitina (Black)	Lilly Rotärmel (GER)	—N/a		34	—N/a	352	3rd place, bronze medalist(s)
Team Oksana Chusovitina (Black)	Santiago Escallier (ARG)	—N/a			21	352	3rd place, bronze medalist(s)
Team Oksana Chusovitina (Black)	Antonia Sakellaridou (GRE)	—N/a			17	352	3rd place, bronze medalist(s)
Team Yang Wei (red)	Liu Yiqian (CHN); Li Zhengyang (CHN)	27	—N/a			403	7
Team Yang Wei (red)	Felix Dolci (CAN)	—N/a	54	—N/a		403	7
Team Yang Wei (red)	Martin Guðmundsson (ISL)	—N/a	23	—N/a		403	7
Team Yang Wei (red)	Bora Tarhan (TUR)	—N/a	63	—N/a		403	7
Team Yang Wei (red)	Kryxia Alicea (PUR)	—N/a	–	—N/a		403	7
Team Yang Wei (red)	Aliaksandra Varabyova (BLR)	—N/a	67	—N/a		403	7
Team Yang Wei (red)	Anastasiia Bachynska (UKR)	—N/a	8	—N/a		403	7
Team Yang Wei (red)	Maria Arakaki (BRA)	—N/a		18	—N/a	403	7
Team Yang Wei (red)	Paula Serrano (ESP)	—N/a		55	—N/a	403	7
Team Yang Wei (red)	Xitlali Santana (MEX)	—N/a		66	—N/a	403	7
Team Yang Wei (red)	Andrew Stamp (GBR)	—N/a			12	403	7
Team Yang Wei (red)	Jessica Pickering (AUS)	—N/a			10	403	7
Team Kohei Uchimura (blue)	Daryna Plokhotniuk (UKR); Oleksandr Madei (UKR)	10	—N/a			407	8
Team Kohei Uchimura (blue)	Abdulaziz Mirvaliev (UZB)	—N/a	115	—N/a		407	8
Team Kohei Uchimura (blue)	Michael Torres (PUR)	—N/a	117	—N/a		407	8
Team Kohei Uchimura (blue)	Ondřej Kalný (CZE)	—N/a	–	—N/a		407	8
Team Kohei Uchimura (blue)	Amelie Morgan (GBR)	—N/a	20	—N/a		407	8
Team Kohei Uchimura (blue)	Tang Xijing (CHN)	—N/a	9	—N/a		407	8
Team Kohei Uchimura (blue)	Csenge Bácskay (HUN)	—N/a	5	—N/a		407	8
Team Kohei Uchimura (blue)	Josephine Juul Møller (NOR)	—N/a		34	—N/a	407	8
Team Kohei Uchimura (blue)	Denisa Stoian (ROU)	—N/a		47	—N/a	407	8
Team Kohei Uchimura (blue)	Anna Kamenshchikova (BLR)	—N/a		22	—N/a	407	8
Team Kohei Uchimura (blue)	Noureddine-Younes Belkhir (ALG)	—N/a			21	407	8
Team Kohei Uchimura (blue)	Emily Mussmann (SUI)	—N/a			7	407	8
Team Marina Chernova (LightGreen)	Arina Yulusheva (UZB); Nikolay Evdokimov (UZB)	30	—N/a			492	12
Team Marina Chernova (LightGreen)	Nguyễn Văn Khánh Phong (VIE)	—N/a	48	—N/a		492	12
Team Marina Chernova (LightGreen)	Vlada Raković (SRB)	—N/a	61	—N/a		492	12
Team Marina Chernova (LightGreen)	Oļegs Ivanovs (LAT)	—N/a	55	—N/a		492	12
Team Marina Chernova (LightGreen)	Lisa Conradie (RSA)	—N/a	59	—N/a		492	12
Team Marina Chernova (LightGreen)	Olivia Araujo (ARG)	—N/a	18	—N/a		492	12
Team Marina Chernova (LightGreen)	Emma Slevin (IRL)	—N/a	33	—N/a		492	12
Team Marina Chernova (LightGreen)	Lee So-yun (KOR)	—N/a		57	—N/a	492	12
Team Marina Chernova (LightGreen)	Jennifer Rivera (COL)	—N/a		86	—N/a	492	12
Team Marina Chernova (LightGreen)	Antonella Genuzio (BOL)	—N/a		20	—N/a	492	12
Team Marina Chernova (LightGreen)	Ivan Litvinovich (BLR)	—N/a			2	492	12
Team Marina Chernova (LightGreen)	Thalia Loveira (NAM)	—N/a			23	492	12

== Judo ==
Individual

Athlete	Event	Round of 16	Quarterfinals	Semifinals	Rep 1	Rep 2	Rep 3	Final / BM	
Athlete	Event	Opposition Result	Opposition Result	Opposition Result	Opposition Result	Opposition Result	Opposition Result	Opposition Result	Rank
Artsiom Kolasau	Boys' -55 kg	Bye	Valadier-Picard (FRA); W 10–00	Daniel Leutgeb (AUT); W 11–00s2	Bye			Ganburged (MGL); W 10s1–00s1	1st place, gold medalist(s)

Team

Athletes	Event	Round of 16	Quarterfinals	Semifinals	Final	
Athletes	Event	Opposition Result	Opposition Result	Opposition Result	Opposition Result	Rank
Team Beijing; Artsiom Kolasau (BLR); Liu Li-ling (TPE); Jaykhunbek Nazarov (UZB); Carlos Páez (VEN); Itzel Pecha (MEX); Ana Viktorija Puljiz (CRO); Veronica Toniolo (ITA)	Mixed team	Team Montreal (MIX); W 5–2	Team Nanjing (MIX); W 4–3	Team London (MIX); W 7–0	Team Athens (MIX); W 4–3	1st place, gold medalist(s)

== Modern pentathlon ==
Belarus qualified one athlete based on its performance at the 2018 Youth A World Championship.

Athlete	Event	Fencing Ranking round (épée one touch)			Swimming (200 m freestyle)			Fencing Bonus round (épée one touch)		Combined: Shooting / Running (10 m air pistol) / (3200 m)			Total points	Final rank
Athlete	Event	Results	Rank	Points	Time	Rank	Points	Results	Points	Time	Rank	Points	Total points	Final rank
Uladzislau Astrouski	Boys' individual	14–9	5	234	2:10.75	12	289	0–1	0	11:46.34	11	594	1117	8
Katsiaryna Etsina	Girls' individual	10–13	17	202	2:20.20	8	270	3–1	3	13:16.16	13	504	979	12
Maria Guimarães (BRA); Uladzislau Astrouski (BLR)	Mixed relay	12–10; 10–12	10	205	2:06.53	18	297	0–1	0	11:54.00	11	586	1088	10
Katsiaryna Etsina (BLR); Adil Ibragimov (KAZ)	Mixed relay	13–9; 8–14	132	200	2:04.81	15	301	1–1	1	11:27.74	1	613	1115	6

== Rowing ==
Belarus qualified one boat based on its performance at the 2017 World Junior Rowing Championships.

Athlete	Event	Time trial		Heats						Quarterfinals		Semifinals		Final	
Athlete	Event	Time trial		Round 1		Round 2		Total points	Rank	Quarterfinals		Semifinals		Final	
Athlete	Event	Time	Rank	Time	Points	Time	Points	Total points	Rank	Time	Rank	Time	Rank	Time	Rank
Ivan Brynza	Boys' single sculls	3:36.79	6	1:44.12	6	1:38.07	8	14	1 Q	1:34.05	1 SA/B	1:37.49	2 FA	1:32.84	2nd place, silver medalist(s)

Qualification Legend: FA=Final A (medal); FB=Final B (non-medal); FC=Final C (non-medal); FD=Final D (non-medal); SA/B=Semifinals A/B; SC/D=Semifinals C/D; R=Repechage

== Sailing ==
Belarus qualified one boat based on its performance at the Techno 293+ European Qualifier.

Athlete	Event	Race													Net points	Final rank
Athlete	Event	1	2	3	4	5	6	7	8	9	10	11	12	M*	Net points	Final rank
Yuliya Matveenko	Girls' Techno 293+	4	7	2	(21)		17	3	16	6	12	6	2	5	80	7

== Shooting ==
Belarus qualified one sport shooter based on its performance at the 2017 European Championships.

Individual

Athlete	Event	Qualification		Final	
Athlete	Event	Points	Rank	Points	Rank
Abdul-Aziz Kurdzi	Boys' 10m air pistol	565	10	did not advance	

Team

Athletes	Event	Qualification		Round of 16	Quarterfinals	Semifinals	Final / BM	
Athletes	Event	Points	Rank	Opposition Result	Opposition Result	Opposition Result	Opposition Result	Rank
Marijana Matea Štrbac (CRO); Abdul-Aziz Kurdzi (BLR)	Mixed 10m air pistol	754	2 Q	Babur (PAK); Chaudhary (IND); W 10–3	Al-Kaabi (IRQ); Son (BEL); L 5–10	did not advance		

== Swimming ==
Boys

Athlete	Event	Heats		Semifinals		Final	
Athlete	Event	Time	Rank	Time	Rank	Time	Rank
Kanstantsin Kurachkin	200 m freestyle	1:52.06	20	—N/a		did not advance	
Kanstantsin Kurachkin	400 m freestyle	3:57.99	21	—N/a		did not advance	
Kanstantsin Kurachkin	800 m freestyle	—N/a				8:17.62	19
Ivan Shamshurin	50 m butterfly	24.97	20	did not advance			
Ivan Shamshurin	100 m butterfly	55.23	25	did not advance			
Ivan Shamshurin	200 m butterfly	2:03.19	16	—N/a		did not advance	

Girls

Athlete	Event	Heats		Semifinals		Final	
Athlete	Event	Time	Rank	Time	Rank	Time	Rank
Alena Semizhon	50 m freestyle	26.32	17 Q	26.56	15	did not advance	
Alena Semizhon	100 m freestyle	57.31	25	did not advance			
Alena Semizhon	50 m backstroke	29.43	13 Q	29.23	10	did not advance	
Anastasiya Shkurdai	50 m backstroke	1:01.74	3 Q	Withdrew			
Anastasiya Shkurdai	100 m backstroke	1:02.68	10 Q	1:03.06	12	did not advance	
Anastasiya Shkurdai	50 m butterfly	26.56	1 Q	26.65	1 Q	26.62	2nd place, silver medalist(s)
Anastasiya Shkurdai	100 m butterfly	1:00.48	3 Q	59.72	1 Q	59.76	3rd place, bronze medalist(s)

== Table tennis ==
Belarus qualified one table tennis player based on its performance at the European Continental Qualifier.

Athlete	Event	Group stage		Round of 16	Quarterfinals	Semifinals	Final / BM	
Athlete	Event	Opposition Score	Rank	Opposition Score	Opposition Score	Opposition Score	Opposition Score	Rank
Nadezhda Bogdanova	Girls' singles	Hirano (JPN) L 0–4; Pyon (PRK) L 0–4; Pavlović (CRO) W 4–2	3	did not advance				17
Europe–3; Nadezhda Bogdanova (BLR); Ioannis Sgouropoulos (GRE)	Mixed team	Intercontinental–2 (MIX) W 3–0; Chinese Taipei L 1–2; Intercontinental–1 (MIX) W 3–0	2 Q	Japan; L 0–2	did not advance			9

== Tennis ==
Singles

Athlete	Event	Round of 32	Round of 16	Quarterfinals	Semifinals	Final / BM	
Athlete	Event	Opposition Score	Opposition Score	Opposition Score	Opposition Score	Opposition Score	Rank
Viktoriya Kanapatskaya	Girls' singles	Wang Xin. (CHN); L 3–6, 6–7^{(5–7)}	did not advance				17

Doubles

Athletes	Event	Round of 32	Round of 16	Quarterfinals	Semifinals	Final / BM	
Athletes	Event	Opposition Score	Opposition Score	Opposition Score	Opposition Score	Opposition Score	Rank
Viktoriya Kanapatskaya (BLR); Daniela Vismane (LAT)	Girls' doubles	—N/a	Wang Xin. (CHN) / Wang Xiy. (CHN); L 0–6, 4–6	did not advance			9
Viktoriya Kanapatskaya (BLR); Arnaud Bovy (BEL)	Mixed doubles	Juvan (SLO) / Miladinović (SRB); L 4–6, 4–6	did not advance				17

== Wrestling ==
Key:
- VFA – Victory by Fall
- VSU – Without any points scored by the opponent
- VSU1 – With point(s) scored by the opponent
- VPO – Without any points scored by the opponent
- VPO1 – With point(s) scored by the opponent

Athlete	Event	Group stage					Final / RM	Rank
Athlete	Event	Opposition Score	Opposition Score	Opposition Score	Opposition Score	Rank	Opposition Score	Rank
Natallia Varakina	Girls' freestyle −49kg	Mosquera (VEN); W 8 – 3 ^{VPO1}	Raimova (KAZ); W 10 – 0 ^{VSU}	Ikei (USA); W 6 – 0 ^{VPO}	Akhmedova (UZB); L 1 – 3 ^{VPO1}	2 Q	Ech-Chabki (MAR); W 12 – 1 ^{VSU1}	3rd place, bronze medalist(s)
Kseniya Dzibuk	Girls' freestyle −73kg	Jlassi (TUN); W 13 – 4 ^{VPO1}	Oknazarova (UZB); W 6 – 2 ^{VPO1}	Machuca (ARG); L 6 – 8 ^{VPO1}	Gök (TUR); W 8 – 0 ^{VFA}	2 Q	Kagami (JPN); L 0 – 8 ^{VPO}	4
