= Shooting at the 2018 Summer Youth Olympics – Girls' 10 metre air pistol =

Girls' 10 metre air pistol at the III Summer Youth Olympic Games
- Venue: Parque Sarmiento
- Dates: 9 October
- Competitors: 20 from 20 nations

Medalists
1st place, gold medalist(s)		Manu Bhaker	India
2nd place, silver medalist(s)		Iana Enina	Russia
3rd place, bronze medalist(s)		Nino Khutsiberidze	Georgia

These are the results for the girls' 10 metre air pistol event at the 2018 Summer Youth Olympics.

== Results ==
=== Qualification ===
Rank	Name	Nation	1	2	3	4	5	6	Points	Notes
1	Manu Bhaker	India	95	96	96	96	95	98	576-19x	Q
2	Iana Enina	Russia	95	94	95	95	93	97	569-15x	Q
3	Lu Kaiman	China	95	97	95	91	97	94	569-12x	Q
4	Nino Khutsiberidze	Georgia	98	96	89	94	94	94	565-13x	Q
5	Greta Rankelytė	Lithuania	95	93	94	94	95	91	562-12x	Q
6	Kanyakorn Hirunphoem	Thailand	93	96	93	93	96	91	562-10x	Q
7	Fatimah Abbas Waheeb al-Kaabi	Iraq	91	96	99	91	92	92	561-11x	Q
8	Anja Prezelj	Slovenia	92	95	88	96	94	95	560-8x	Q
9	Andrea Victoria Ibarra Miranda	Mexico	94	92	95	91	92	95	559-12x	
10	Vanessa Seeger	Germany	95	91	93	93	95	92	559-9x	
11	Marijana Matea Štrbac	Croatia	97	90	96	89	91	95	558-7x	
12	Kateline Nicolas	France	94	94	94	91	92	92	557-11x	
13	Giulia Campostrini	Italy	92	92	92	94	98	88	556-5x	
14	Olivia Kate Erickson	Australia	92	94	94	92	89	92	553-5x	
15	Juana Rueda	Colombia	96	94	87	93	93	89	552-6x	
16	Mak Amanda Sao Keng	Singapore	93	95	89	91	88	93	549-10x	
17	Gloria Fernández	Spain	91	89	89	92	94	89	544-9x	
18	Daria-Olimpia Haristiade	Romania	91	90	91	95	88	89	544-6x	
19	Doua Chalghoum	Tunisia	91	92	93	85	90	86	537-8x	
20	Nubaira Babur	Pakistan	82	90	85	86	86	89	518-6x	

=== Final ===
Rank	Name	Nation	1	2	3	4	5	6	7	8	9	Points	Notes
1st place, gold medalist(s)	Manu Bhaker	India	50.1	49.2	19.6	19.9	18.6	19.8	19.1	19.8	20.3	236.5	
2nd place, silver medalist(s)	Iana Enina	Russia	49.5	49.6	19.7	17.7	18.5	19.2	20.6	19.9	21.2	235.9	
3rd place, bronze medalist(s)	Nino Khutsiberidze	Georgia	48.3	48.0	19.8	20.9	18.9	20.4	20.2	18.1		214.6	
4	Kanyakorn Hirunphoem	Thailand	48.1	51.0	19.1	19.2	19.8	19.8	17.3			194.3	
5	Anja Prezelj	Slovenia	49.5	47.5	20.1	19.1	18.7	18.6				173.5	
6	Lu Kaiman	China	49.3	47.6	17.3	19.2	19.6					153.0	
7	Fatimah Abbas Waheeb al-Kaabi	Iraq	43.6	48.6	20.1	18.4						130.7	
8	Greta Rankelytė	Lithuania	43.0	47.7	19.7							110.4	
