= Athletics at the 2018 Summer Youth Olympics – Girls' shot put =

Girls' shot put at the III Summer Youth Olympic Games
- Venue: Parque Polideportivo Roca
- Date: 12 October and 15 October 2018
- Competitors: 15 from 15 nations

Medalists
1st place, gold medalist(s)		Li Xinhui	China
2nd place, silver medalist(s)		Yelizaveta Dorts	Belarus
3rd place, bronze medalist(s)		Dane Roets	South Africa

The girls' shot put competition at the 2018 Summer Youth Olympics was held on 12 and 15 October, at the Parque Polideportivo Roca.

== Schedule ==
All times are in local time (UTC-3).

Date	Time	Round
12 October 2018	16:25	Stage 1
15 October 2018	16:50	Stage 2

== Results ==
=== Stage 1 ===
Rank	Athlete	Nation	1	2	3	4	Result	Notes
1	Li Xinhui	China	18.16	17.57	18.42	18.29	18.42	
2	Yelizaveta Dorts	Belarus	17.60	x	17.37	17.59	17.60	
3	Dane Roets	South Africa	16.26	17.30	17.12	16.66	17.30	
4	Nina Capațina	Moldova	16.50	17.09	x	x	17.09	
5	Kelsie Murrel-Ross	Grenada	15.47	15.41	14.83	14.90	15.47	PB
6	Yana Kopcheva	Bulgaria	x	x	x	15.41	15.41	
7	Rafaela Cristine Maciel de Sousa	Brazil	14.86	14.07	14.81	15.38	15.38	
8	Danielle Sloley	Jamaica	15.00	x	14.84	14.39	15.00	
9	Anastasiia Derkach	Ukraine	14.48	14.64	14.78	13.61	14.78	
10	Josefine Klisch	Germany	14.22	14.73	14.52	14.68	14.73	
11	Lorna Zurita	Ecuador	14.73	14.44	13.59	x	14.73	
12	Myrthe Van der Borght	Belgium	14.15	x	13.69	14.46	14.46	
13	Ana Brkljačić	Croatia	14.18	14.03	14.25	14.08	14.25	
14	Michaela Vrecková	Slovakia	13.03	12.70	13.11	13.22	13.22	
15	Tjaša Zajc	Slovenia	x	12.77	x	12.30	12.77	

=== Stage 2 ===
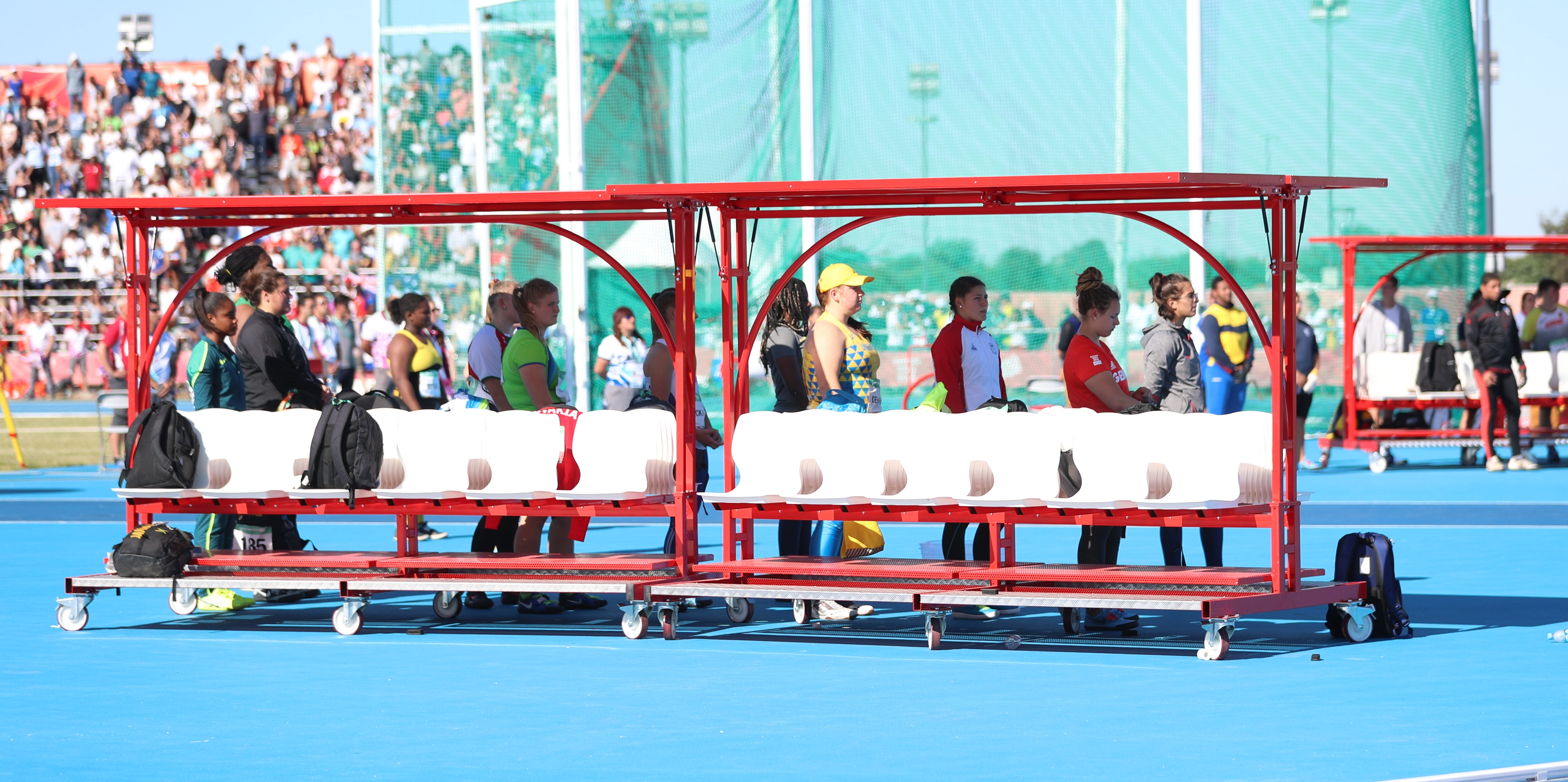
Preparation of the athletes

Rank	Athlete	Nation	1	2	3	4	Result	Notes
1	Li Xinhui	China	18.25	18.15	18.33	x	18.33	
2	Yelizaveta Dorts	Belarus	17.53	16.83	x	16.37	17.53	
3	Nina Capațina	Moldova	17.13	17.42	17.01	16.43	17.42	
4	Dane Roets	South Africa	16.79	17.14	16.19	17.34	17.34	
5	Lorna Zurita	Ecuador	15.38	15.79	x	14.76	15.79	
6	Yana Kopcheva	Bulgaria	15.21	15.16	15.24	x	15.24	
7	Kelsie Murrel-Ross	Grenada	14.78	14.91	x	15.23	15.23	
8	Danielle Sloley	Jamaica	13.36	15.16	x	14.46	15.16	
9	Rafaela Cristine Maciel de Sousa	Brazil	15.07	15.09	15.10	14.55	15.10	
10	Anastasiia Derkach	Ukraine	14.37	14.66	x	14.30	14.66	
11	Ana Brkljačić	Croatia	13.21	14.26	14.47	14.04	14.47	
12	Josefine Klisch	Germany	x	14.34	14.07	x	14.34	
13	Tjaša Zajc	Slovenia	13.03	13.35	13.03	13.13	13.35	
14	Myrthe Van der Borght	Belgium	x	13.35	13.10	12.84	13.35	
15	Michaela Vrecková	Slovakia	x	12.43	12.80	12.89	12.89	

=== Final placing ===
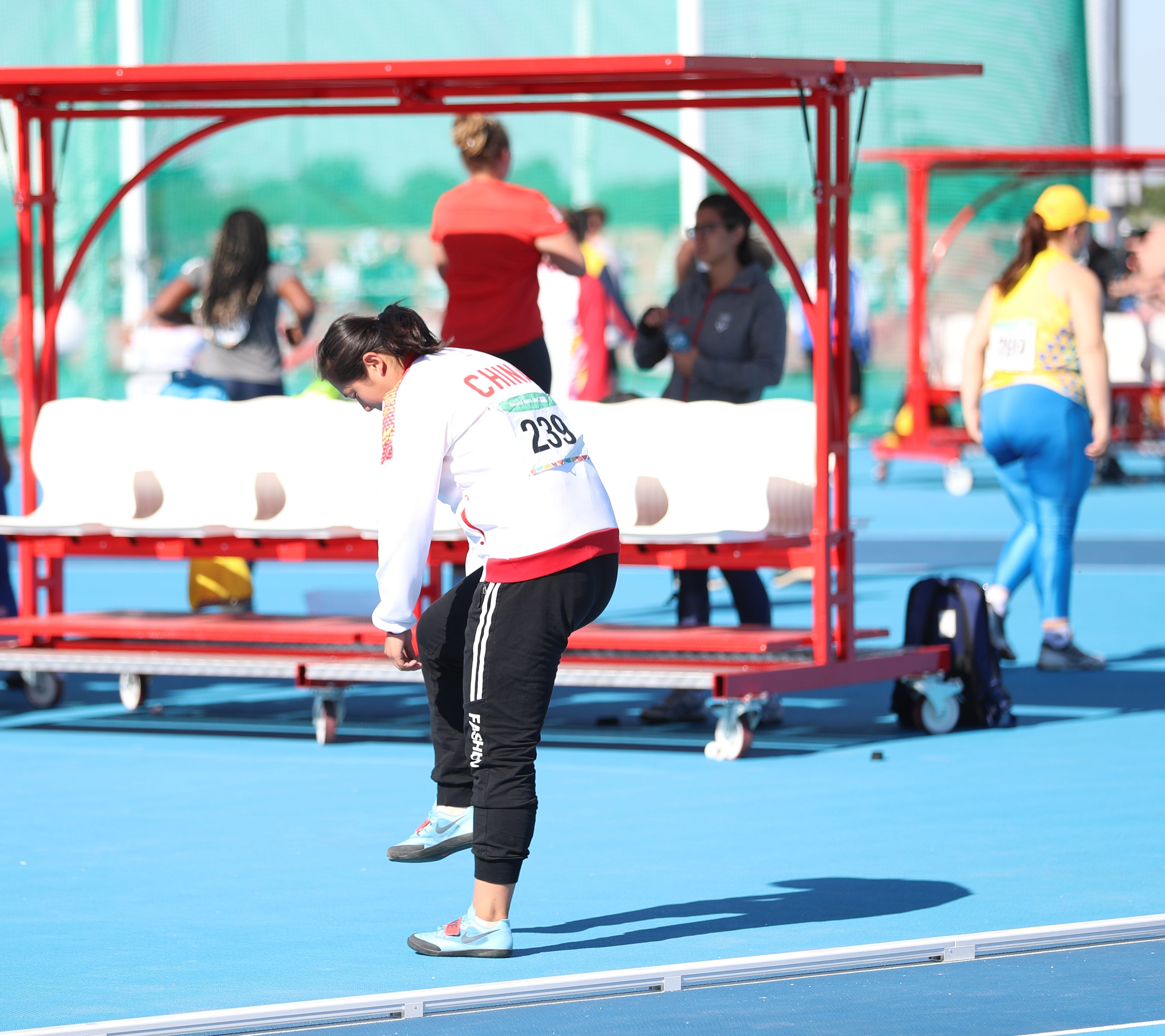
Li Xinhui, Gold medallist

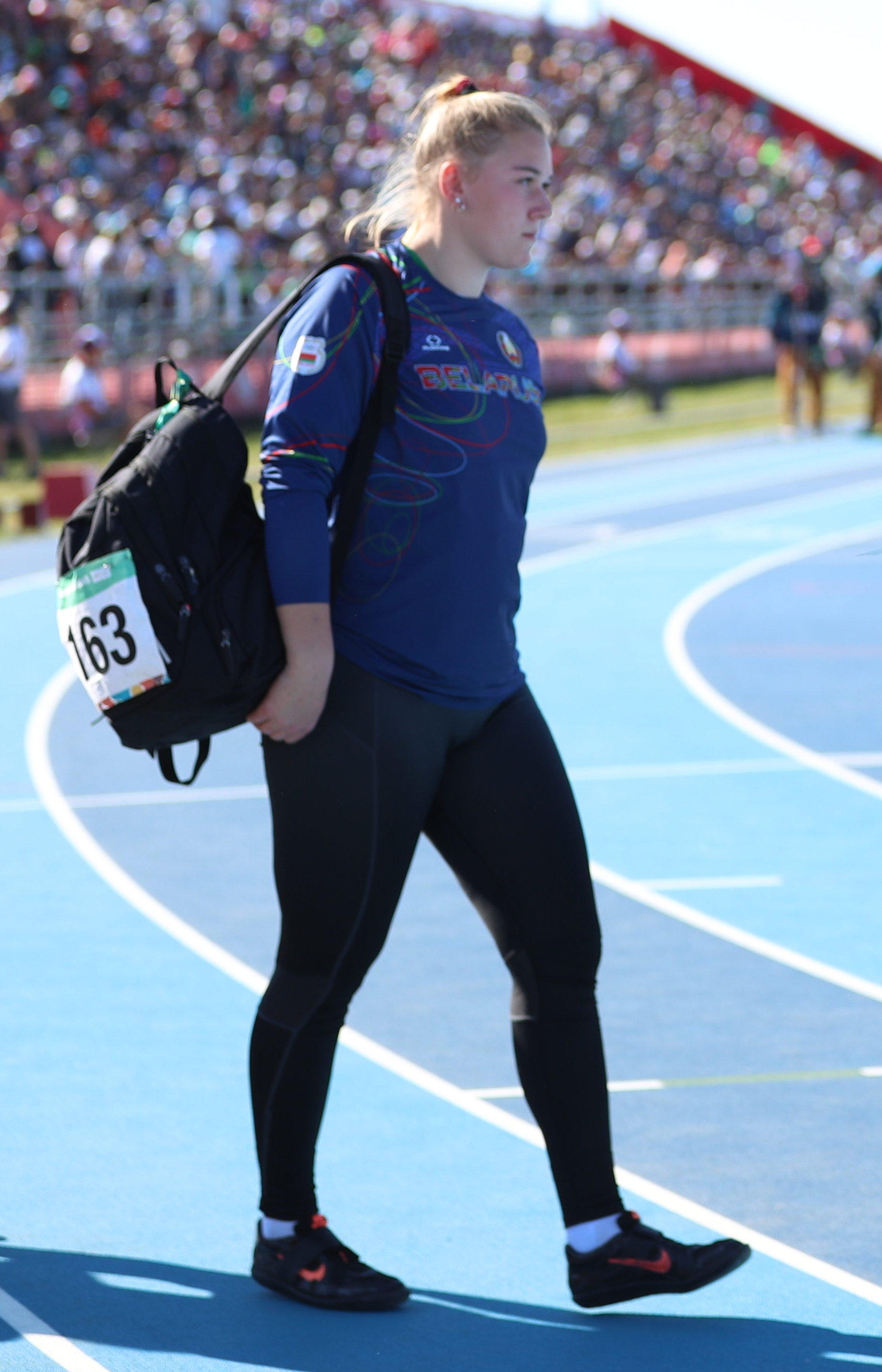
Yelizaveta Dorts, Silver medallist

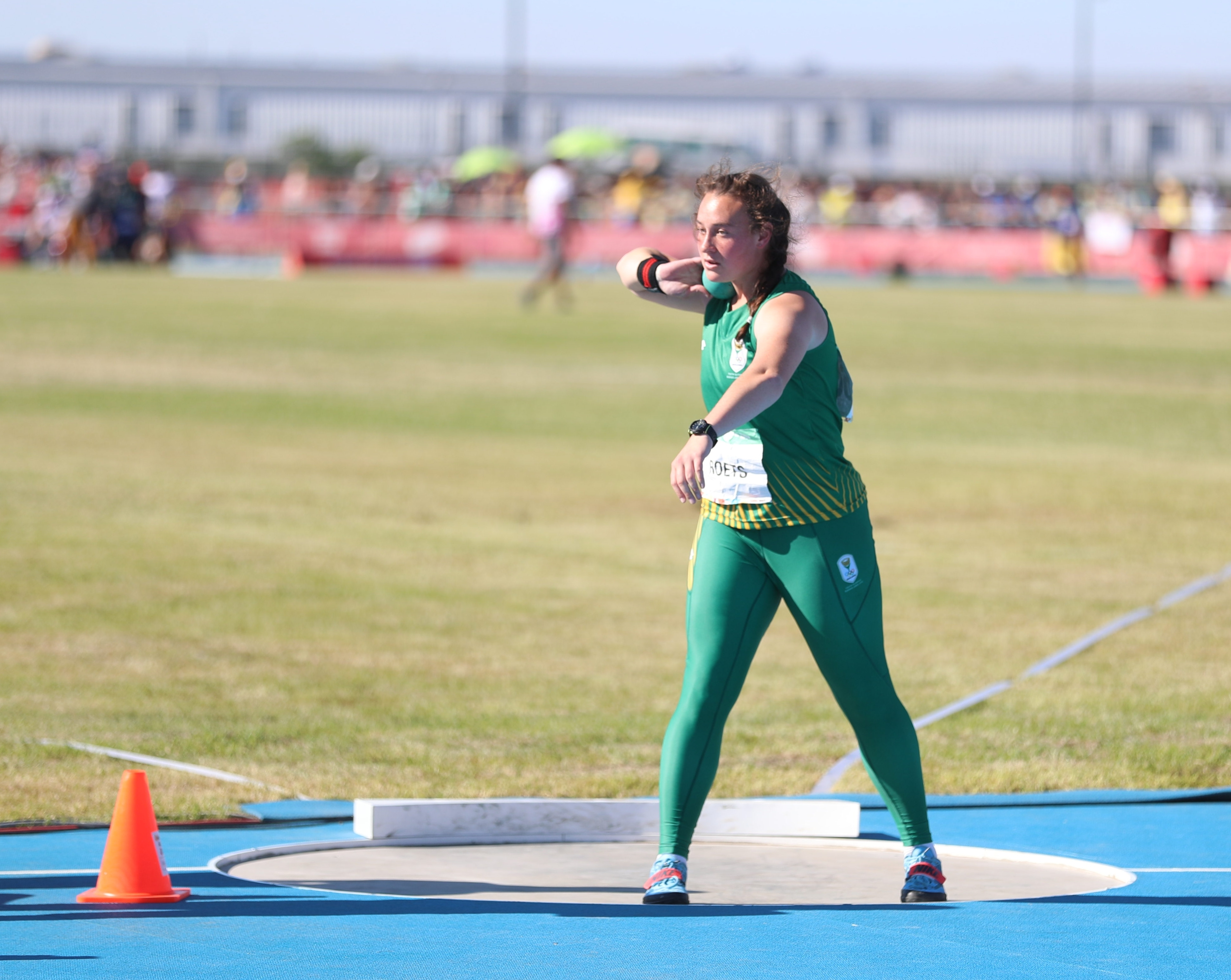
Dane Roets, Bronze medallist

Rank	Athlete	Nation	Stage 1	Stage 2	Total
1st place, gold medalist(s)	Li Xinhui	China	18.42	18.33	36.75
2nd place, silver medalist(s)	Yelizaveta Dorts	Belarus	17.60	17.53	35.13
3rd place, bronze medalist(s)	Dane Roets	South Africa	17.30	17.34	34.64
4	Nina Capațina	Moldova	17.09	17.42	34.51
5	Kelsie Murrel-Ross	Grenada	15.47	15.23	30.70
6	Yana Kopcheva	Bulgaria	15.41	15.24	30.65
7	Lorna Zurita	Ecuador	14.73	15.79	30.52
8	Rafaela Cristine Maciel de Sousa	Brazil	15.38	15.10	30.48
9	Danielle Sloley	Jamaica	15.00	15.16	30.16
10	Anastasiia Derkach	Ukraine	14.78	14.66	29.44
11	Josefine Klisch	Germany	14.73	14.34	29.07
12	Ana Brkljačić	Croatia	14.25	14.47	28.72
13	Myrthe Van der Borght	Belgium	14.46	13.35	27.81
14	Tjaša Zajc	Slovenia	12.77	13.35	26.12
15	Michaela Vrecková	Slovakia	13.22	12.89	26.11
