= Belgium at the 2018 Summer Youth Olympics =

- IOC code: BEL
- NOC: Belgian Olympic Committee
- Website: https://www.teambelgium.be/

in Buenos Aires, Argentina 6 – 18 October 2018
- Competitors: 32 in 23 sports
- Flag bearer: Henri Demesmaeker
- Medals Ranked 30th: Gold 2 Silver 4 Bronze 3 Total 9

Summer Youth Olympics appearances (overview)
- 2010; 2014; 2018; 2026

Belgium participated at the 2018 Summer Youth Olympics in Buenos Aires, Argentina from 6 October to 18 October 2018.

== Medalists ==
Medals awarded to participants of mixed-NOC teams are represented in italics. These medals are not counted towards the individual NOC medal tally.

Medal	Name	Sport	Event	Date
Gold	Maité Beernaert	Athletics	Girls' long jump	14 October
Gold	Quentin Mahauden	Karate	Boys' 68 kg	18 October
Silver	Sasha Deheneffe; Sam Hofman; Moussa Noterman; Ferre Vanderhoydonck	Basketball	Boys' tournament	17 October
Silver	Jules Vangeel	Canoeing	K1 sprint	13 October
Silver	Simon Jan Morssinkhof	Equestrian	Team Jumping	9 October
Silver	Badr Achab	Taekwondo	Boys −73 kg	10 October
Bronze	Senna Roos	Archery	Boys' Individual	17 October
Bronze	Julien Carraggi	Badminton	Mixed Teams	12 October
Bronze	Alessia Corrao	Judo	Girls' 63 kg	8 October

Medals by sport
Sport	1st place, gold medalist(s)	2nd place, silver medalist(s)	3rd place, bronze medalist(s)	Total
Athletics	1	0	0	1
Karate	1	0	0	1
Basketball	0	1	0	1
Canoeing	0	1	0	1
Taekwondo	0	1	0	1
Archery	0	0	1	1
Judo	0	0	1	1
Total	2	3	2	7

== Archery ==
Belgium qualified one archer based on its performance at the 2018 European Youth Championships.

Individual

Athlete	Event	Ranking round		Round of 32	Round of 16	Quarterfinals	Semifinals	Final / BM	Rank
Athlete	Event	Score	Seed	Opposition Score	Opposition Score	Opposition Score	Opposition Score	Opposition Score	Rank
Senna Roos	Boys' Individual	677	8th Q	Rezowan (BAN); W 6–5	Ak (TUR); W 7–1	Song (KOR); W 7–1	Akash (IND); L 0–6	Ovchynnikov (UKR); W 7–3	3rd place, bronze medalist(s)

Team

Athletes	Event	Ranking round		Round of 32	Round of 16	Quarterfinals	Semifinals	Final / BM	Rank
Athletes	Event	Score	Seed	Opposition Score	Opposition Score	Opposition Score	Opposition Score	Opposition Score	Rank
Senna Roos (BEL); Ana Luiza Sliachticas Caetano (BRA)	Mixed Team	1302	6th Q	Walter (SAM); Feng (CHN); W 6–2	Touraine-Helias (FRA); Solera (ESP); L 2–6	did not advance			9

== Athletics ==
Boys
Track & road events

Athlete	Event	Stage 1		Stage 2	
Athlete	Event	Result	Rank	Result	Rank
Louis Vandermessen	2000 m steeplechase	5:46.07	3rd	12:34	12th

Girls
Track & road events

Athlete	Event	Stage 1		Stage 2	
Athlete	Event	Result	Rank	Result	Rank
Mariam Oulare	100 m	12.09	5th	11.57	6th
Liefde Schoemaker	400 m	56.14	7th	55.75	6th

Field events

Athlete	Event	Stage 1		Stage 2	
Athlete	Event	Distance	Position	Distance	Position
Maité Beernaert	Long jump	6.01	4th	6.31	1st place, gold medalist(s)
Myrthe Van der Borght	Shot put	14.46	12th	13.35	14th
Elena Defrère	Discus throw	44.01	13th	44.01	14th

== Badminton ==
Belgium qualified one player based on the Badminton Junior World Rankings.

Singles

Athlete	Event	Group stage				Quarterfinal	Semifinal	Final / BM
Athlete	Event	Opposition Score	Opposition Score	Opposition Score	Rank	Opposition Score	Opposition Score	Opposition Score
Julien Carraggi	Boys' Singles	Toti (ITA); L 1–2	Toledano (ESP); W 2–0	Li (CHN); L 0–2	2nd	did not advance		

Teams

Athlete	Event	Group stage				Quarterfinal	Semifinal	Final / BM
Athlete	Event	Opposition Score	Opposition Score	Opposition Score	Rank	Opposition Score	Opposition Score	Opposition Score
Theta; Julien Carraggi (BEL); Mohamed Mostafa Kamel (EGY); Kodai Naraoka (JPN); Lukas Resch (GER); Zecily Fung (AUS); Jaqueline Lima (BRA); Hirari Mizui (JPN); Tereza Švábíková (CZE)	Mixed Teams	Sigma; L 100–110	Omega; L 100–110	Gamma; L 107–110	4th Q	Delta; W 110–93	Alpha; L 90–110	Zeta; W 110–107 (bronze)

== Basketball ==
Belgium qualified a boys' team based on its performance at the 2017 FIBA 3x3 U18 World Cup.

Boys

Athlete	Event	Group stage					Quarterfinal	Semifinal	Final / BM
Athlete	Event	Opposition Score	Opposition Score	Opposition Score	Opposition Score	Rank	Opposition Score	Opposition Score	Opposition Score
Sacha Deheneffe; Sam Hofman; Moussa Noterman; Ferre Vanderhoydonck	Boys'	Latvia; W 18–16	Kazakhstan; W 20–9	Kyrgyzstan; W 21–11	Italy; W 18–16	1 Q	Brazil; W 21–10	Slovenia; W 14–12	Argentina; L 15–20 (silver)

Skills Competition

Athlete	Event	Qualification		Final	
Athlete	Event	Points	Rank	Points	Rank
Sacha Deheneffe	Boys' Dunk Contest	38	8	did not advance	

== Breaking ==
Singles

Athlete	Event	Group stage				Quarterfinal	Semifinal	Final / BM
Athlete	Event	Opposition Score	Opposition Score	Opposition Score	Rank	Opposition Score	Opposition Score	Opposition Score
Reflow	B-Boys'	Shigekix (JPN); L 0–2	Jordan (RSA); W 2–0	D-Matt (CAN); L 0–2	9th	did not advance		

Team

Athlete	Event	Group stage				Quarterfinal	Semifinal	Final / BM
Athlete	Event	Opposition Score	Opposition Score	Opposition Score	Rank	Opposition Score	Opposition Score	Opposition Score
Reflow (BEL); Matina (RUS)	Mixed Team	Yell (KOR); Jordan (RSA); L 0–2	Anastasia (LAT); Shigekix (JPN); L 0–2	Vale (ARG); Axel (POL); D 1–1	10th	did not advance		

== Canoeing ==
Belgium qualified one boat based on its performance at the 2018 World Qualification Event.

Boys

Athlete	Event	Qualification		Repechage		Quarterfinals	Semifinals	Final / BM	Rank
Athlete	Event	Time	Rank	Time	Rank	Opposition Result	Opposition Result	Opposition Result	Rank
Jules Vangeel	K1 slalom	1:17.65	8th	1:14.95	1st Q	Changheng (CHN); L 1:09.92	did not advance		
Jules Vangeel	K1 sprint	1:40.67	2nd Q	Bye		Khakimjonov (UZB); W 1:40.69	Pilarz (POL); W 1:41.2	Kiss (HUN); L 1:09.92	2nd place, silver medalist(s)

== Equestrian ==
Belgium qualified a rider based on its performance at the FEI European Junior Jumping Championships.

- Individual Jumping – 1 athlete

Athlete	Horse	Event	Round 1		Round 2			Total		Jump off		
Athlete	Horse	Event	Penalties	Rank	Penalties	Total	Rank	Penalties	Rank	Penalties	Total	Rank
Simon Jan Morssinkhof	Cheptel Wigan	Individual Jumping	0	1	4	4	7	4	7	did not advance		
Europe; Jack Whitaker (GBR); Giacomo Casadei (ITA); Vince Jármy (HUN); Rowen van de Mheen (NED); Simon Jan Morssinkhof (BEL)	L V Chance Luck; Darna Z Walterstown Cruise Z Baral Ourika; Cheptel Wigan	Team Jumping	0; 0; 4 # 0; 0 #	0	4 # 0; 0; 0; 4 #	0	0	4 # 0 # 0; 0; 0	0	38.31 # 37.85 # 34.99; 34.79; 31.80	101.58	2nd place, silver medalist(s)

== Fencing ==
Belgium qualified one athlete based on its performance at the 2018 Cadet World Championship.

- Girls' Épée – Axelle Wasiak

== Golf ==
Individual

Athlete	Event	Round 1		Round 2			Round 3			Total		
Athlete	Event	Score	Rank	Score	Total	Rank	Score	Total	Rank	Score	Par	Rank
Margaux Marie E Appart	Girls' Individual	78 (+8)	18	78 (+8)	156	23	78 (+8)	234	26	234	+24	22
Jean S F de Wouters	Boys' Individual	78 (+8)	26	75 (+5)	153	17	75 (+5)	228	18	228	+18	22

Team

Athletes	Event	Round 1 (Fourball)		Round 2 (Foursome)		Round 3 (Individual Stroke)				Total		
Athletes	Event	Score	Rank	Score	Rank	Girl	Boy	Total	Rank	Score	Par	Rank
Margaux Marie E Appart; Jean S F de Wouters	Mixed team	70 (0)	29	75 (+5)	18	78	73	151 (+11)	24	296	+16	25

== Gymnastics ==
=== Artistic ===
Belgium qualified one gymnast based on its performance at the 2018 European Junior Championship.

Boys

Athlete	Event	Apparatus						Total	Rank
Athlete	Event	F	PH	R	V	PB	HB	Total	Rank
Ward Claeys	Qualification	12.633	12.866	12.566	12.933	13.033	12.733	76.764	10
Ward Claeys	All-Around	12.633	12.866	12.566	12.933	13.033	12.733	76.764	10

=== Multidiscipline ===
Team	Athlete	Acrobatic	Artistic	Rhythmic	Trampoline	Total points	Rank
Team Anna Bessonova (Gray)	Sophia Imrie-Gale (GBR); Clyde Gembickas (GBR)	15	—N/a			381	4
Team Anna Bessonova (Gray)	Ward Claeys (BEL)	—N/a	99	—N/a		381	4
Team Anna Bessonova (Gray)	Reza Bohloulzade Hajlari (IRI)	—N/a	65	—N/a		381	4
Team Anna Bessonova (Gray)	Ayan Moldagaliyev (KAZ)	—N/a	36	—N/a		381	4
Team Anna Bessonova (Gray)	Eglė Stalinkevičiūtė (LTU)	—N/a	42	—N/a		381	4
Team Anna Bessonova (Gray)	Ada Hautala (FIN)	—N/a	10	—N/a		381	4
Team Anna Bessonova (Gray)	Giorgia Villa (ITA)	—N/a	11	—N/a		381	4
Team Anna Bessonova (Gray)	Celia Joseph Noël (FRA)	—N/a		40	—N/a	381	4
Team Anna Bessonova (Gray)	Celeste D'arcangelo (ARG)	—N/a		13	—N/a	381	4
Team Anna Bessonova (Gray)	Tatyana Volozhanina (BUL)	—N/a		26	—N/a	381	4
Team Anna Bessonova (Gray)	Jérémy Chartier (CAN)	—N/a			15	381	4
Team Anna Bessonova (Gray)	Vera Beliankina (RUS)	—N/a			9	381	4

== Judo ==
Individual

Athlete	Event	Round of 16	Quarterfinals	Semifinals	Final	
Athlete	Event	Opposition Result	Opposition Result	Opposition Result	Opposition Result	Rank
Alessia Corrao	Girls' 63 kg	Kim Ju-hee (KOR); W 11–01	Itzel Pecha (MEX); W 10–00	Szofi Ozbas (HUN); L 00–01s1	Hasret Bozkurt (TUR); W 10–01	3rd place, bronze medalist(s)

Team

Athletes	Event	Round of 16	Quarterfinals	Semifinals	Final	Rank
Athletes	Event	Opposition Result	Opposition Result	Opposition Result	Opposition Result	Rank
Team Moscow; Augusta Ambourouet (GAB); Alessia Corrao (BEL); Temuujin Ganburged (MGL); Alexis Harrison Ayarza (PAN); Hamza Jashari (MKD); Paulina Țurcan (MDA); Zsombor Vég (HUN)	Mixed Team	Team Singapore (MIX); W 4–3	Team London (MIX); L 3–4	did not advance		

== Karate ==
Belgium qualified one athlete based on its performance at one of the Karate Qualification Tournaments.

- Boys' −68 kg – Quentin Mahauden

Athlete	Event	Pool Matches				Semifinal	Final / BM	
Athlete	Event	Opposition Score	Opposition Score	Opposition Score	Rank	Opposition Score	Opposition Score	Rank
Quentin Mahauden	Boys' 68 kg	Bošković (MNE); W 2–0	Shyroian (UKR); D 0–0	Ruggiero (ITA); W 7–6	1	Abilmansur Batyrgali (KAZ); W 3–1	Yassine Sekouri (MAR); W 1–0	1st place, gold medalist(s)

== Roller speed skating ==
Boys

Athlete	Event	1000m sprint		5000m elimination	500m sprint		Total rank
Athlete	Event	Time	Rank	Rank	Time	Rank	Total rank
Jason Suttels	Combined						

== Rowing ==
Belgium qualified one boat based on its performance at the 2017 World Junior Rowing Championships.

Girls'

Athlete	Event	Heats		Repechage		Semifinals		Final	
Athlete	Event	Time	Rank	Time	Rank	Time	Rank	Time	Rank
Caitlin Govaert	Single Sculls								

Qualification Legend: FA=Final A (medal); FB=Final B (non-medal); FC=Final C (non-medal); FD=Final D (non-medal); SA/B=Semifinals A/B; SC/D=Semifinals C/D; R=Repechage

== Sailing ==
Belgium qualified one boat based on its performance at the 2018 Nacra 15 World Championships.

- Mixed Nacra 15 – 1 boat

Athlete	Event	Race													Net points	Final rank
Athlete	Event	1	2	3	4	5	6	7	8	9	10	11	12	M*	Net points	Final rank
Henri Demesmaeker; Frederique Van Eupen	Nacra 15	4	15	7	11	1	2	2	2	3	5	2	2	8	49	4

== Shooting ==
Individual

Athlete	Event	Qualification		Final	
Athlete	Event	Points	Rank	Points	Rank
Jerome Son	Boys' 10 metre air pistol	555-16	14	did not advance	

Team

Athletes	Event	Qualification		Round of 16	Quarterfinals	Semifinals	Final / BM	Rank
Athletes	Event	Points	Rank	Opposition Result	Opposition Result	Opposition Result	Opposition Result	Rank
Fatimah Al-Kaabi (IRQ); Jerome Son (BEL)	Mixed 10 metre air pistol	741-15	10	Erickson (AUS); Schejbal (CZE); W 10–9	Štrbac (CRO); Kurdzi (BLR); W 10–5	Seeger (GER); Kirov (BUL); L 6–10	Ibarra (MEX); Honta (UKR); L 4–10	4

== Sport climbing ==
Boys

Athlete	Event	Qualification				Final			
Athlete	Event	Speed	Bouldering	Lead	Rank	Speed	Bouldering	Lead	Rank
Lukas Franckaert	Combined								

== Taekwondo ==
- 1 Quota - Boys −73 kg

Athlete	Event	Quarterfinals	Semifinals	Final	
Athlete	Event	Opposition Result	Opposition Result	Opposition Result	Rank
Badr Achab	Boys −73 kg	Andranik Khachatryan (ARM); W 23–15	Eyad Adel Mahmoud (EGY); W 8–4	Ali Eshkevarian (IRI); L 16–17	2nd place, silver medalist(s)

== Tennis ==
Singles

Athlete	Event	Round of 32	Round of 16	Quarterfinals	Semifinals	Final / BM
Athlete	Event	Opposition Score	Opposition Score	Opposition Score	Opposition Score	Opposition Score
Arnaud Bovy	Boys' Singles	Tajima (JPN); L (4–6, 2–6)	did not advance			17

Doubles

Athletes	Event	Round of 32	Round of 16	Quarterfinals	Semifinals	Final / BM
Athletes	Event	Opposition Score	Opposition Score	Opposition Score	Opposition Score	Opposition Score
Arnaud Bovy (BEL); Marko Miladinović (SRB)	Boys' Doubles	—N/a	Gaston (FRA); Tabur (FRA); L (0–6, 4–6)	did not advance		9
Arnaud Bovy (BEL); Viktoryia Kanapatskaya (BLR)	Mixed Doubles	Juvan (SLO); Miladinović (SRB); L (4–6, 4–6)	did not advance			17

== Triathlon ==
Belgium qualified two athletes based on its performance at the 2018 European Youth Olympic Games Qualifier.

Individual

Athlete	Event	Swim (750m)	Trans 1	Bike (20 km)	Trans 2	Run (5 km)	Total Time	Rank
Rik Malcorps	Boys	10:00	0:32	29:05	0:25	18:21	58:23	24
Hanne Peeters	Girls	10:32	0:41	31:25	0:27	17:57	1:01:02	10

Relay

Athlete	Event	Total Times per Athlete (Swim 250m, Bike 6.6 km, Run 1.8 km)	Total Group Time	Rank
Europe 4 Hanne Peeters (BEL); Gergely Kiss (HUN); Nikolett Ferenczi (HUN); Calum Young (GBR)	Mixed Relay	23:01 (9); 21:00 (4); 23:42 (5); 21:38 (5)	1:29:21	4
Europe 6 Ines Rico (POR); Jan Škrjanc (SLO); Libby Coleman (GBR); Rik Malcorps (BEL)	Mixed Relay	23:01 (10); 21:27 (7); 23:14 (4); 21:53 (6)	1:29:21	5
