= India at the 2018 Summer Youth Olympics =

- IOC code: IND
- NOC: Indian Olympic Association
- Website: http://www.olympic.ind.in/

in Buenos Aires, Argentina 6 – 18 October 2018
- Competitors: 46 in 13 sports
- Flag bearers: Manu Bhaker; Jeremy Lalrinnunga
- Medals Ranked 17th: Gold 3 Silver 9 Bronze 1 Total 13

Summer Youth Olympics appearances (overview)
- 2010; 2014; 2018; 2026

India participated at the 2018 Summer Youth Olympics in Buenos Aires, Argentina from 6 October to 18 October 2018. India managed their best ever medal haul of the Youth Olympics in this edition. Among the 206 participating nations, India ranked 17th on the medals tally.

Jeremy Lalrinnunga won India's first ever Youth Olympics gold medal. Tababi Devi won the first ever Youth Olympics medal for India in Judo and later also won a silver in the mixed team event under mixed-NOCs. Manu Bhaker became the first Indian girl to win a Youth Olympics gold medal and later also won a silver in the mixed 10 metre air pistol event under mixed-NOCs. Both Boys' and Girls' Hockey 5s teams won silver medals in their debut.

== Medalists ==
Medals awarded to participants of Mixed-NOC teams are represented in (italics). These medals are not counted towards the Individual NOC Medal tally.

Medal	Name	Sport	Event	Date
Gold	Jeremy Lalrinnunga	Weightlifting	Boys' 62 kg	October 8
Gold	Manu Bhaker	Shooting	Girls' 10 metre air pistol	October 9
Gold	Saurabh Chaudhary	Shooting	Boys' 10 metre air pistol	October 10
Silver	Lakshya Sen	Badminton	Mixed team	October 12
Silver	Tushar Mane	Shooting	Boys' 10 metre air rifle	October 7
Silver	Tababi Devi	Judo	Girls' 44 kg	October 7
Silver	Mehuli Ghosh	Shooting	Girls' 10 metre air rifle	October 8
Silver	Tababi Devi	Judo	Mixed team	October 10
Silver	Manu Bhaker	Shooting	Mixed 10 metre air pistol	October 12
Silver	Simran Kaur	Wrestling	Girl's freestyle 43 kg	October 13
Silver	India men's national field hockey team: Prashant Chauhan; Shivam Anand; Rahul Rajbhar; Maninder Singh; Rabichandra Moirangathem; Sudeep Chirmako; Pawan Malik; Sanjay Kumar; Vivek Prasad	Field hockey	Boys' tournament	October 14
Silver	India women's national field hockey team: Bichu Devi Kharibam; Ishika Chaudhary; Khushboo Khan; Salima Tete; Mumtaz Khan; Baljeet Kaur; Chetna Rathi; Reet; Lalremsiami	Field hockey	Girls' tournament	October 14
Silver	Suraj Panwar	Athletics	Boys' 5 km walk	October 15
Silver	Akash Malik	Archery	Boys' individual	October 17
Bronze	Praveen Chithravel	Athletics	Boys' triple jump	October 16

Medals by sport
Sport	1st place, gold medalist(s)	2nd place, silver medalist(s)	3rd place, bronze medalist(s)	Total
Shooting	2	2	0	4
Weightlifting	1	0	0	1
Field hockey	0	2	0	2
Athletics	0	1	1	2
Archery	0	1	0	1
Badminton	0	1	0	1
Judo	0	1	0	1
Wrestling	0	1	0	1
Total	3	9	1	13

Medals by gender
Gender	1st place, gold medalist(s)	2nd place, silver medalist(s)	3rd place, bronze medalist(s)	Total
Male	2	5	1	8
Female	1	4	0	5
Total	3	9	1	13

Medals by date
Day	Date	1st place, gold medalist(s)	2nd place, silver medalist(s)	3rd place, bronze medalist(s)	Total
Day 1	7 October	0	2	0	2
Day 2	8 October	1	1	0	2
Day 3	9 October	1	0	0	1
Day 4	10 October	1	0	0	1
Day 5	11 October	0	0	0	0
Day 6	12 October	0	1	0	1
Day 7	13 October	0	1	0	1
Day 8	14 October	0	2	0	2
Day 9	15 October	0	1	0	1
Day 10	16 October	0	0	1	1
Day 11	17 October	0	1	0	1
Day 12	18 October	0	0	0	0
Total		3	9	1	13

== Competitors ==
India placed 46 athletes in 13 sports with 36 events, its largest contingent till now. India marks its debut in field hockey 5s and sport climbing at the Youth Olympics. The contingent includes ISSF senior and junior world cup champion Manu Bhaker, Commonwealth Games medallist shooter Mehuli Ghosh, ISSF senior world champion Saurabh Choudary, world youth boxing champion Jyoti Gulia and world youth silver medalist Jeremy Lalrinunga in weightlifting.

Sports	Boys	Girls	Total	Events
Archery	1	1	2	3
Athletics	5	2	7	7
Badminton	1	1	2	3
Boxing	0	1	1	1
Field Hockey	9	9	18	2
Judo	0	1	1	1
Rowing	2	0	2	1
Shooting	2	2	4	6
Sport Climbing	1	0	1	1
Swimming	2	0	2	4
Table Tennis	1	1	2	3
Weightlifting	1	1	2	2
Wrestling	0	2	2	2
Total	25	21	46	36

== Archery ==
India qualified two archers based on its performance at the Asian Continental Qualification Tournament.

Athlete	Event	Ranking round		Round of 32	Round of 16	Quarterfinals	Semifinals	Final / BM	Rank
Athlete	Event	Score	Seed	Opposition Score	Opposition Score	Opposition Score	Opposition Score	Opposition Score	Rank
Akash Malik	Boys' individual	679	5	Lee (CAN); W 6–5	Solera (ESP); W 6–2	Vaca (MEX); W 6–4	Roos (BEL); W 6–0	Cowles (USA); L 0–6	2nd place, silver medalist(s)
Himani Kumari	Girls' individual	665	3	Walter (SAM); W 7–1	GNoriega (USA); L 4–6	did not advance			
Selin Satır (TUR) / Akash Malik (IND)	Mixed team	1296	24	Jerez (DOM) / De Carvalho (BRA); W 5–3	Winkel (NED) / Cheremiskin (RUS); W 6–2	Giannasio (ARG) / Aitthiwat (THA); L 0–6	did not advance		
Himani Kumari (IND) / Wian Roux (RSA)	Mixed team	1274	29	Tromans-Ansell (GBR) / Shabani (IRI); L 1–5	did not advance				

== Athletics ==
=== Track and Road events ===
Athlete	Event	Stage 1		Stage 2		Total	
Athlete	Event	Result	Rank	Result	Rank	Total	Rank
Nisar Ahmed	Boy's 200 m	22.08	19	21.72 PB	19	43.80	19
Sreekiran Nandakumar	Boy's 800 m	1:52.42	9	2:06.51	24	3:58.93	22
Suraj Panwar	Boys' 5 km walk	20:23.30 PB	2	20:35.87	1	40:59.17	2nd place, silver medalist(s)
Vishnupriya Jayaprakashan	Girl's 400 m hurdles	1:02.56	11	1:01.92	12	2:04.48	12
Seema	Girl's 3000 m	10:03.34	14	14:25	12	26	13

=== Field events ===
Athlete	Event	Stage 1		Stage 2		Total	
Athlete	Event	Distance	Rank	Distance	Rank	Total	Rank
Praveen Chithravel	Boy's triple jump	15.84	3	15.68	5	31.52	3rd place, bronze medalist(s)
Kunwer Ajai Raj	Boy's javelin throw	71.45	9	75.06	3	146.51	6

== Badminton ==
India qualified two players based on the Badminton Junior World Rankings.

Athlete	Event	Group Stage				Quarterfinals	Semifinals	Final / BM	
Athlete	Event	Opposition Score	Opposition Score	Opposition Score	Rank	Opposition Score	Opposition Score	Opposition Score	Rank
Lakshya Sen	Boys' singles	Kamel (EGY); W (21–14, 21–10)	Bosniuk (UKR); W (23–21, 21–8)	Farias (BRA); W (23–6, 21–16)	1 Q	Rumbay (INA); W (21–17, 21–19)	Naraoka (JPN); W (14–21, 21–15, 24–22)	Li Sf (CHN); L (15–21, 19–21)	2nd place, silver medalist(s)
Jakka Vaishnavi Reddy	Girls' singles	Andreu (ESP); W (21–13, 21–6)	Gai (USA); L (18–21, 21–23)	Saponara (PER); W (21–14, 21–8)	2	did not advance			
Lakshya Sen (Team Alpha)	Mixed teams	Epsilon; W 110–98	Delta; L 99–110	Zeta; W 110–103	2	Gamma; W 110–94	Theta; W 110–90	Omega; W 110–106	1st place, gold medalist(s)
Jakka Vaishnavi Reddy (Team Gamma)	Mixed teams	Omega; L 99–110	Sigma; L 86–110	Theta; W 110–107	3	Alpha; L 94–110	did not advance		

== Boxing ==
India qualified one boxer based on its performance at the 2017 Youth Women’s World Boxing Championships.

Athlete	Event	Preliminaries	Semifinals	Final / RM	Rank
Athlete	Event	Opposition Result	Opposition Result	Opposition Result	Rank
Jyoti Gulia	Girls' 51kg	La Piana (ITA); L 0–5	did not advance		5

== Field hockey ==
India qualified 2 teams (Men and Women) based on its performance at the 2018 Youth Olympics Qualifiers. Both teams won silver medals.

=== Boy's 5s ===
Team: Prashant Chauhan, Shivam Anand, Rahul Rajbhar, Maninder Singh, Sanjay Kumar, Sudeep Chirmako, Pawan Malik, Rabichandra Moirangathem, Vivek Prasad

==== Preliminary round ====
Pool B

Pos	Team	Pld	W	D	L	GF	GA	GD	Pts	Qualification
1	Australia	5	5	0	0	23	9	+14	15	Quarterfinals
2	India	5	4	0	1	34	8	+26	12	Quarterfinals
3	Austria	5	3	0	2	11	16	−5	9	Quarterfinals
4	Bangladesh	5	2	0	3	12	22	−10	6	Quarterfinals
5	Canada	5	1	0	4	13	22	−9	3	9th place game
6	Kenya	5	0	0	5	10	26	−16	0	11th place game

Source: FIH
Rules for classification: 1) Points; 2) Goal difference; 3) Goals scored; 4) Head-to-head result.

7 October 2018
11:45

India	10–0	Bangladesh
Anand 4'; Rajbhar 4', 9'; Sanjay 6'; Prasad 9', 18'; Chirmako 11', 17'; Singh 12'; Moirangthem 20'	Report

Umpires:
Hideki Kinoshita (JPN)
Hristiyan Vasilev (BUL)

8 October 2018
14:45

India	9–1	Austria
Sanjay (field hockey) 2'; Anand 4', 10', 17'; Chirmako 6', 11', 14', 18'; Prasad 13'	Report	Drusany 8'

Umpires:
Hristiyan Vasilev (BUL)
Nick Saunders (NZL)

9 October 2018
09:30

Kenya	1–7	India
Ouma 7'	Report	Chirmako 5', 10'; Moirangthem 5', 11'; Prasad 8'; Sanjay (field hockey) 14'; Rajbhar 17'

Umpires:
Hideki Kinoshita (JPN)
Jonathan Altamirano (MEX)

10 October 2018
17:45

India	3–4	Australia
Prasad 6', 18'; Anand 20'	Report	Davis 2'; Collins 3'; Murray 18'; B. Marais 19'

Umpires:
Nick Saunders (NZL)
Jonathan Altamirano (MEX)

11 October 2018
13:15

Canada	2–5	India
Childs 15', 16'	Report	Sanjay 4', 17'; Anand 7'; Chirmako 10'; Rajbhar 17'

Umpires:
Jonathan Altamirano (MEX)
Hristiyan Vasilev (BUL)

==== Final round ====
Quarterfinal

12 October 2018
11:00

India	4–2	Poland
Anand 1', 8'; Singh 3'; Sanjay 17'	Report	E. Bembenek 16'; Nowkowski 18'

Umpires:
Darren Hubach (RSA)
James Unkles (AUS)

Semifinal

13 October 2018
15:00

Argentina	1–3	India
Zarate 4'	Report	Rajbhar 3'; Chirmako 12', 18'

Umpires:
Peter Kabaso (KEN)
Hristiyan Vasilev (BUL)

Gold medal match

14 October 2018
15:00

India	2–4	Malaysia
Prasad 3', 6'	Report	Rosdi 5'; Anuar 14', 19'; Ishak 18'

Umpires:
Jonathan Altamirano (MEX)
Hristiyan Vasilev (BUL)

=== Girl's 5s ===
Team: Salima Tete, Reet, Khushboo Khan, Ishika Chaudhary, Mumtaz Khan, Baljeet Kaur, Chetna Rathi, Bichu Devi Kharibam, Lalremsiami

==== Preliminary round ====
Pool A

Pos	Team	Pld	W	D	L	GF	GA	GD	Pts	Qualification
1	Argentina (H)	5	5	0	0	41	2	+39	15	Quarterfinals
2	India	5	4	0	1	29	10	+19	12	Quarterfinals
3	South Africa	5	3	0	2	19	13	+6	9	Quarterfinals
4	Austria	5	2	0	3	19	13	+6	6	Quarterfinals
5	Uruguay	5	1	0	4	23	13	+10	3	9th place game
6	Vanuatu	5	0	0	5	0	80	−80	0	11th place game

Source: FIH
Rules for classification: 1) Points; 2) Goal difference; 3) Goals scored; 4) Head-to-head result.
(H) Hosts

7 October 2018
14:00

India	4–2	Austria
Lalremsiami 4', 17'; Tete 5'; Khan 16'	Report	Hruby 13'; Kern 20'

Umpires:
Sophie Bockelmann (GER)
Margaux Brand (CAN)

8 October 2018
09:30

India	2–1	Uruguay
Lalremsiami 1', 19'	Report	Verga 10'

Umpires:
Sophie Bockelmann (GER)
Rhiannon Murrie (AUS)

9 October 2018
16:15

Vanuatu	0–16	India
	Report	Lalremsiami 2', 10'; Reet 3', 6'; Tete 4', 13'; Kaur 5', 5'; Chetna 6', 14', 17'; Khan 8', 11', 12', 15'; Chaudhary 20'

Umpires:
Cynthia Clement (GHA)
Jianjun Chen (CHN)

10 October 2018
12:30

India	2–5	Argentina
Khan 8'; Reet 10'	Report	di Santo 7'; Ramallo 10', 12'; Bruggesser 17'; Palet 19'

Umpires:
Rhiannon Murrie (AUS)
Fatma Mahmoud (EGY)

11 October 2018
14:00

South Africa	2–5	India
de Waal 10'; Welham 19'	Report	Khan 2', 17'; Reet 10'; Lalremsiami 12'; Chaudhary 13'

Umpires:
Rhiannon Murrie (AUS)
Fatma Mahmoud (EGY)

==== Final round ====
Quarterfinal

12 October 2018
14:00

India	3–0	Poland
Lalremsiami 10'; Tete 14'; Kaur 14'	Report

Umpires:
Lizé Srtydom (RSA)
Jianjun Chen (CHN)

Semifinal

13 October 2018
16:00

India	3–0	China
Khan 1'; Reet 5'; Lalremsiami 20'	Report

Umpires:
Lizé Srtydom (RSA)
Victoria Pazos (PAR)

Gold medal match

14 October 2018
16:30

Argentina	3–1	India
Palet 7'; Ramallo 10'; Bruggesser 12'	Report	Khan 1'

Umpires:
Sophie Bockelmann (GER)
Rhiannon Murrie (AUS)

== Judo ==
Athlete	Event	Round of 16	Quarterfinals	Semifinals	Repechage			Final / BM	
Athlete	Event	Round of 16	Quarterfinals	Semifinals	Round of 8	Quarterfinals	Semifinals	Final / BM	
Athlete	Event	Opposition Result	Opposition Result	Opposition Result	Opposition Result	Opposition Result	Opposition Result	Opposition Result	Rank
Tababi Devi	Girls' 44 kg	Wangmo (BHU); W 10–0	Muminoviq (KOS); W 1s2–0	Puljiz (CRO); W 10–0s1	—N/a			Giménez (VEN); L 0s1–11	2nd place, silver medalist(s)
Tababi Devi (Team Athens)	Mixed team	Bye	Los Angeles; W 5–3	Rio de Janeiro; W 5–3	—N/a			Beijing; L 3–4	2nd place, silver medalist(s)

== Rowing ==
India qualified one boat based on its performance at the 2018 Asian Youth Olympic Games Qualification Regatta.

Athlete	Event	Round 1		Round 2			Round 3			Points	Rank	Semifinal		Final	
Athlete	Event	Time	Rank	Time	Points	Rank	Time	Points	Rank	Points	Rank	Time	Rank	Time	Rank
Satnam Singh; Ashish Goliyan	Boys' pair	3:27.57	6	1:38.85	3	3	1:36.90	3	3	6	8 Q	1:32.00	4 FB	1:38.01	8

== Shooting ==
India qualified four sport shooters based on its performance at the 2017 Asian Championships.

Individual

Athlete	Event	Qualification		Final	
Athlete	Event	Points	Rank	Points	Rank
Shahu Tushar Mane	Boys' 10 m air rifle	623.7	3 Q	247.5	2nd place, silver medalist(s)
Saurabh Chaudhary	Boys' 10 m air pistol	580	1 Q	244.2	1st place, gold medalist(s)
Mehuli Ghosh	Girls' 10 m air rifle	628.1	1 Q	248.0	2nd place, silver medalist(s)
Manu Bhaker	Girls' 10 m air pistol	576	1 Q	236.5	1st place, gold medalist(s)

Mixed

Athlete	Event	Qualification		Round of 16	Quarterfinal	Semifinal	Final	
Athlete	Event	Points	Rank	Opposition Score	Opposition Score	Opposition Score	Opposition Score	Rank
Shahu Tushar Mane (IND) / Latifa Al-Maazmi (UAE)	Mixed 10 metre air rifle	803.2	20	did not advance				20
Carlos Arze (PER) / Mehuli Ghosh (IND)	Mixed 10 metre air rifle	809.9	19	did not advance				19
Saurabh Chaudhary (IND) / Nubaira Babur (PAK)	Mixed 10 metre air pistol	738	15	Štrbac (CRO) / Kurdzi (BLR); L 3–10	did not advance			
Bezhan Fayzullaev (TJK) / Manu Bhaker (IND)	Mixed 10 metre air pistol	751	5	Kanyakorn (THA) / Abdelfatah (EGY); W 10–4	Rankelytė (LTU) / Usanli (MDA); W 10–8	Ibarra (MEX) / Honta (UKR); W 10–3	Seeger (GER) / Kirov (BUL); L 3–10	2nd place, silver medalist(s)

== Sport climbing ==
India qualified one sport climber based on its performance at the 2017 Asian Youth Sport Climbing Championships.

Athlete	Event	Speed Qualification		Bouldering Qualification		Lead Qualification			Points	Final			
Athlete	Event	Time	Points	Result	Points	Hold Reached	Time	Points	Points	Speed	Bouldering	Lead	Rank
Bharath Pereira	Boy's combined	7.17	7	1T 2z	14	20	1:31	21	2058	did not advance			18

== Swimming ==
Athlete	Event	Heat		Semifinal		Final	
Athlete	Event	Time	Rank	Time	Rank	Time	Rank
Srihari Nataraj	Boys' 50 m backstroke	26.55	18	did not advance			
Srihari Nataraj	Boys' 100 m backstroke	56.75	9 Q	56.48	9 Q	56.12	6
Srihari Nataraj	Boys' 200 m backstroke	2:04.80	13	—N/a		did not advance	
Advait Page	Boys' 800 m freestyle	—N/a				8:16.06	17

== Table tennis ==
India qualified one table tennis player based on its performance at the Road to Buenos Aires (Asia) series in Thailand and one more in the form of Archana Kamath at the Road to Buenos Aires (Oceania) in the Cook Islands.

Athlete	Event	Group Stage				Round of 16	Quarterfinal	Semifinal	Final / BM	
Athlete	Event	Opposition Score	Opposition Score	Opposition Score	Rank	Opposition Score	Opposition Score	Opposition Score	Opposition Score	Rank
Manav Thakkar	Boys' singles	Stankevičius (LTU); W 4–2	Ahmadian (IRI); L 1–4	Choong (MAS); W 4–2	2 Q	Harimoto (JPN); L 1–4	did not advance			
Archana Kamath	Girls' singles	Goi R X (SGP); W 4–1	Al-Hodaby (EGY); W 4–0	Vovk (SLO); W 4–1	1 Q	Lee K Y (HKG); W 4–2	Ning J (AZE); W 4–3	Sun Ys (CHN); L 1–4	Dragoman (ROU); L 1–4	4
Archana Kamath; Manav Thakkar	Mixed team	Ning J / Yu Kh (AZE); L 0–3	Gauthier / Rembert (FRA); W 3–0	Morri (SMR) / Lorenzo (ARG); W 3–0	2 Q	Dragoman / Pletea (ROU); L 1–2	did not advance			

== Weightlifting ==
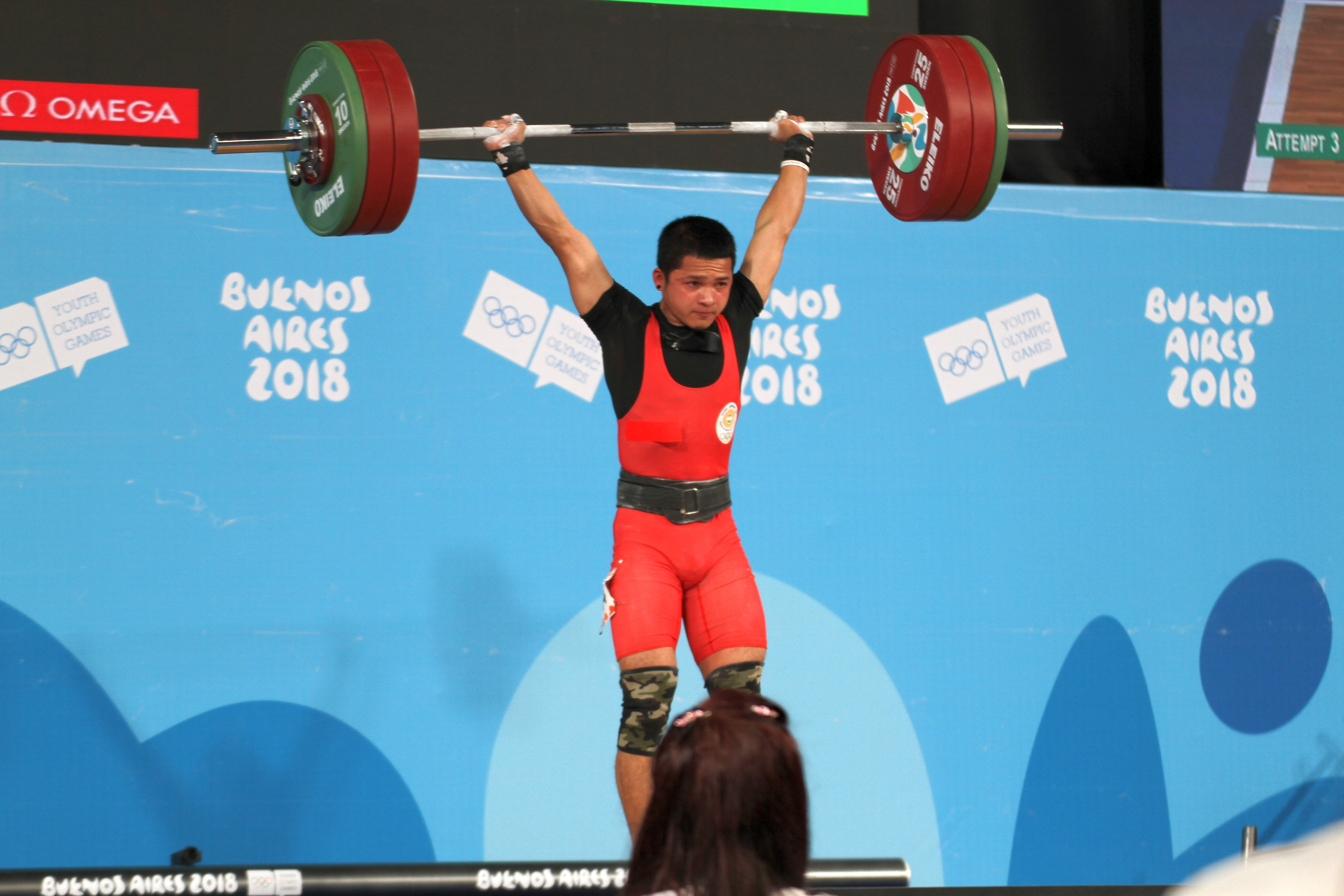
Jeremy Lalrinnunga at his final attempt

India qualified two athletes based on its performance at the 2018 Asian Youth Championships.

Athlete	Event	Snatch		Clean & jerk		Total	Rank
Athlete	Event	Result	Rank	Result	Rank	Total	Rank
Jeremy Lalrinnunga	Boy's 62 kg	124	1	150	1	274	1st place, gold medalist(s)
Sneha Soren	Girl's 48 kg	67	5	84	5	151	5

== Wrestling ==
India qualified two athletes based on its performance at the 2018 Asian Cadet Championships.

Key:

- VT – Victory by Fall.
- PP – Decision by Points – the loser with technical points.
- PO – Decision by Points – the loser without technical points.
- ST – Technical superiority – the loser without technical points and a margin of victory of at least 10 points.
- SP – Technical superiority – the loser with technical points and a margin of victory of at least 10 points.
- VB – Victory by Injury
- VC – Victory due to 3 cautions

Athlete	Event	Group stage					Final / RM	Rank
Athlete	Event	Opposition Score	Opposition Score	Opposition Score	Opposition Score	Rank	Opposition Score	Rank
Simran Kaur	Girls' freestyle 43 kg	Derry (NZL); W 5–0 ^{VB}	Leorda (MDA); W 5–0 ^{VT}	Mahmoud (EGY); W 4–1 ^{SP}	Batbaatar (MGL); W 2–1 ^{PP}	1	Shilson (USA); L 1–3 ^{PP}	2nd place, silver medalist(s)
Mansi Ahlawat	Girls' freestyle 57 kg	Szél (HUN); L 0–3 ^{PO}	Toida (CMR); W 3–1 ^{PP}	Parra (VEN); L 1–3 ^{PP}	Ringaci (MDA); L 0–5 ^{VT}	4	Ahmed (EGY); L 0–5 ^{VT}	8
