= Shooting at the 2018 Summer Youth Olympics – Boys' 10 metre air pistol =

Boys' 10 metre air pistol at the III Summer Youth Olympic Games
- Venue: Parque Sarmiento
- Dates: 10 October
- Competitors: 20 from 20 nations

Medalists
1st place, gold medalist(s)		Saurabh Chaudhary	India
2nd place, silver medalist(s)		Sung Yun-ho	South Korea
3rd place, bronze medalist(s)		Jason Solari	Switzerland

These are the results for the boys' 10 metre air pistol event at the 2018 Summer Youth Olympics.

== Results ==
=== Qualification ===
Rank	Name	Nation	1	2	3	4	5	6	Points	Notes
1	Saurabh Chaudhary	India	97	96	95	100	95	97	580-19x	Q
2	Erfan Salavati	Iran	95	97	97	98	96	97	580-17x	Q
3	Pavel Schejbal	Czech Republic	97	95	94	95	96	95	572-11x	Q
4	Jason Solari	Switzerland	93	97	94	96	97	93	570-13x	Q
5	Rihards Zorge	Latvia	95	96	95	96	93	94	569-17x	Q
6	Sung Yun-ho	South Korea	97	96	96	94	93	93	569-15x	Q
7	Jan Luca Karstedt	Germany	91	93	95	96	96	96	567-14x	Q
8	Eldar Imankulov	Kazakhstan	94	95	94	94	94	95	566-16x	Q
9	James Andrew John Miller	Great Britain	94	93	98	93	92	96	566-14x	
10	Abdul-Aziz Kurdzi	Belarus	92	95	93	96	96	93	565-17x	
11	Kiril Kirov	Bulgaria	94	96	94	91	93	94	562-14x	
12	Dmytro Honta	Ukraine	94	91	95	92	94	95	561-13x	
13	Kirill Ușanlî	Moldova	90	95	92	94	95	92	558-11x	
14	Jerome Son	Belgium	96	90	92	92	93	92	555-16x	
15	Jerguš Vengríni	Slovakia	92	92	94	93	92	91	554-8x	
16	Alp Eren Erdur	Turkey	90	94	90	93	93	91	551-8x	
17	Omar Abdelfatah	Egypt	90	91	89	96	92	91	549-11x	
18	Brian Wai Kuk Ng	Canada	88	91	92	94	91	92	548-6x	
19	Sebastian Hernández García	Mexico	91	90	94	90	91	91	547-10x	
20	Bezhan Fayzullaev	Tajikistan	89	86	96	91	89	87	538-7x	

=== Final ===
Rank	Name	Nation	1	2	3	4	5	6	7	8	9	Points	Notes
1st place, gold medalist(s)	Saurabh Chaudhary	India	50.3	51.3	20.5	20.3	20.1	20.6	20.3	20.1	20.7	244.2	
2nd place, silver medalist(s)	Sung Yun-ho	South Korea	49.4	48.4	20.3	19.3	20.1	20.6	20.4	20.1	18.1	236.7	
3rd place, bronze medalist(s)	Jason Solari	Switzerland	48.0	50.7	19.1	19.7	20.1	19.1	20.6	18.3		215.6	
4	Eldar Imankulov	Kazakhstan	49.4	48.0	19.6	20.2	19.8	19.5	20.5			197.0	
5	Erfan Salavati	Iran	48.4	49.6	19.5	19.3	19.7	18.2				174.7	
6	Jan Luca Karstedt	Germany	49.5	50.3	20.3	19.9	20.4					156.4	
7	Pavel Schejbal	Czech Republic	46.4	47.2	20.5	20.3						134.4	
8	Rihards Zorge	Latvia	44.7	47.6	17.9							110.2	
