= Iraq at the 2018 Summer Youth Olympics =

- IOC code: IRQ
- NOC: National Olympic Committee of Iraq
- Website: http://www.nociraq.iq/

in Buenos Aires, Argentina 6 – 18 October 2018
- Competitors: 15
- Medals: Gold 0 Silver 0 Bronze 0 Total 0

Summer Youth Olympics appearances (overview)
- 2010; 2014; 2018

Iraq participated at the 2018 Summer Youth Olympics in Buenos Aires, Argentina from 6 October to 18 October 2018.

== Equestrian ==
Iraq was given a rider to compete from the tripartite committee.

- Individual Jumping - 1 athlete

Summary

Athlete	Horse	Event	Qualification					Final					Total	
Athlete	Horse	Event	Round 1		Round 2			Round A		Round B			Total	
Athlete	Horse	Event	Penalties	Rank	Penalties	Total	Rank	Penalties	Rank	Penalties	Total	Rank	Penalties	Rank
In Shaallah Hameed	Kings Charade	Individual	—					4	24 Q	12	16	24	16	24
Asia; Sara Hussein Saleh Al Armouti (JOR); Edgar Fung (HKG); Momen Zindaki (SYR); In Shaallah Hameed (IRQ); Abdushukur Sobirjonov (UZB)	Passe One Z The Winner Z Cooper Larquino; Kings Charade; Quby Z	Team	13 # 0; 0; 4; 8 #	4	1; 4; 0; 4 # 4 #	5	9	—					38	6

== Futsal ==
=== Boys' tournament ===
Roster

- Layth Noori
- Mohammed Ismael
- Abbas Abdulkareem
- Salim Kadhim
- Mohammed Faeq
- Hussein Sabri
- Ezzat Sabeeh
- Qusay Muntadher
- Hadi Alaa
- Hussein Abdulrahman

Group stage

Pos	Team	Pld	W	D	L	GF	GA	GD	Pts	Qualification
1	Egypt	4	3	1	0	15	8	+7	10	Semi-finals
2	Argentina (H)	4	2	1	1	19	8	+11	7	Semi-finals
3	Iraq	4	2	1	1	12	5	+7	7	
4	Slovakia	4	1	0	3	5	12	−7	3	
5	Panama	4	0	1	3	7	25	−18	1	

Source: FIFA IOC
(H) Hosts
7 October 2018
18:00

Panama	1–1	Iraq
Ogilvie 29'	Report (FIFA); Report (IOC) Category:Futsal at the 2018 Summer Youth Olympics – Boys First Round – PAN-IRQ on Wikimedia Commons	Alaa 32'

Tecnópolis
Attendance: 3,600
Referee: Ricardo Amaral (Brazil)

8 October 2018
20:00

Iraq	5–0	Slovakia
Abdulrahman 23', 30'; Kadhim 25', 28'; Sabri 35'	Report (FIFA); Report (IOC) Category:Futsal at the 2018 Summer Youth Olympics – Boys First Round – IRQ-SVK on Wikimedia Commons

Tecnópolis
Attendance: 650
Referee: Nikola Jelić (Croatia)

10 October 2018
20:00

Iraq	2–3	Egypt
Faeq 21'; Sabri 32'	Report (FIFA); Report (IOC)	El-Sayed 7'; Mohsen 10', 33'

Tecnópolis
Attendance: 850
Referee: Diego Molina (Costa Rica)

12 October 2018
20:00

Argentina	1–4	Iraq
Rufino 21'	Report (FIFA); Report (IOC)	Sabeeh 26'; Sabri 30'; Ismael 37'; Kadhim 37'

Tecnópolis
Attendance: 6,500
Referee: Nikola Jelić (Croatia)

== Fencing ==
Iraq was given a quota to compete by the tripartite committee.

- Boys' Sabre - 1 quota

== Shooting ==
Iraq was given a quota by the tripartite committee to compete in shooting.

- Girls' 10m Air Pistol - 1 quota

Individual

Athlete	Event	Qualification		Final	
Athlete	Event	Points	Rank	Points	Rank
Fatimah Al-Kaabi	Girls' 10 metre air pistol	561-11x	7 Q	130.7	7

Team

Athletes	Event	Qualification		Round of 16	Quarterfinals	Semifinals	Final / BM	Rank
Athletes	Event	Points	Rank	Opposition Result	Opposition Result	Opposition Result	Opposition Result	Rank
Fatimah Al-Kaabi (IRQ); Jerome Son (BEL)	Mixed 10 metre air pistol	741-15	10	Erickson (AUS); Schejbal (CZE); W 10–9	Štrbac (CRO); Kurdzi (BLR); W 10–5	Seeger (GER); Kirov (BUL); L 6–10	Ibarra (MEX); Honta (UKR); L 4–10	4
