= Tajikistan at the 2018 Summer Youth Olympics =

- IOC code: TJK
- NOC: National Olympic Committee of the Republic of Tajikistan
- Website: www.olympic.tj (in Tajik)

in Buenos Aires, Argentina 6 – 18 October 2018
- Competitors: 3 in 3 sports
- Medals: Gold 0 Silver 0 Bronze 0 Total 0

Summer Youth Olympics appearances
- 2010; 2014; 2018

Tajikistan participated at the 2018 Summer Youth Olympics in Buenos Aires, Argentina from 6 October to 18 October 2018.

== Judo ==
Individual

Athlete	Event	Round of 16	Quarterfinals	Semifinals	Rep 1	Rep 2	Rep 3	Final / BM	
Athlete	Event	Opposition Result	Opposition Result	Opposition Result	Opposition Result	Opposition Result	Opposition Result	Opposition Result	Rank
Jamshed Sulaimoni	Boys' 66 kg	Sultan Zhenishbekov (KGZ); W 10-00	Vugar Talibov (AZE); L 00s2-01s1	did not advance	Bye	Kimy Bravo (CUB); L 00s2-01s2	did not advance		

Team

Athletes	Event	Round of 16	Quarterfinals	Semifinals	Final	
Athletes	Event	Opposition Result	Opposition Result	Opposition Result	Opposition Result	Rank
Team Rio de Janeiro; Milana Charygulyyeva (TKM); Yassamine Djellab (ALG); Metka Lobnik (SLO); Erza Muminoviq (KOS); Abrek Naguchev (RUS); Fleury Nihozeko (BUR); Jamshed Sulaimoni (TJK); Sultan Zhenishbekov (KGZ)	Mixed team	Team Sydney (MIX); W 4–3	Team Atlanta (MIX); W 5–4	Team Athens (MIX); L 3–5	did not advance	3rd place, bronze medalist(s)

== Shooting ==
Individual

Athlete	Event	Qualification		Final	
Athlete	Event	Points	Rank	Points	Rank
Bezhan Fayzullaev	Boys' 10 m air pistol	538-7	20	did not advance	

Mixed

Athlete	Event	Qualification		Round of 16	Quarterfinal	Semifinal	Final	
Athlete	Event	Points	Rank	Opposition Score	Opposition Score	Opposition Score	Opposition Score	Rank
Bezhan Fayzullaev (TJK) / Manu Bhaker (IND)	Mixed 10 metre air pistol	751	5	Kanyakorn (THA) / Abdelfatah (EGY); W 10–4	Rankelytė (LTU) / Usanli (MDA); W 10–8	Ibarra (MEX) / Honta (UKR); W 10–3	Seeger (GER) / Kirov (BUL); L 3–10	2nd place, silver medalist(s)
