= Lithuania at the 2018 Summer Youth Olympics =

- IOC code: LTU
- NOC: Lithuanian National Olympic Committee
- Website: www.ltok.lt (in Lithuanian and English)

in Buenos Aires
- Competitors: 15 in 8 sports
- Flag bearer: Dominykas Čepys
- Medals Ranked 52nd: Gold 1 Silver 1 Bronze 1 Total 3

Summer Youth Olympics appearances (overview)
- 2010; 2014; 2018

Lithuania competed at the 2018 Summer Youth Olympics, in Buenos Aires, Argentina from 6 October to 18 October 2018.

== Athletics ==
- Boys shot put - Dominykas Čepys
- Boys Discus Throw - Matas Makaravičius
- Boys 110 m Hurdles - Dovidas Petkevičius

Athlete	Event	Stage 1		Stage 2		Total	
Athlete	Event	Result	Rank	Result	Rank	Total	Rank
Dovidas Petkevičius	Boys' 110 metre hurdles	14.56	17	14.72	16	29.28	16
Dominykas Čepys	Boys' shot put	17.34	14	17.97	10	35.31	11
Matas Makaravičius	Boys' discus throw	NM	15	NM	15	NM	15

== Gymnastics ==
=== Artistic ===
Lithuania qualified one gymnast based on its performance at the 2018 European Junior Championship.

- Girls' artistic individual all-around - Eglė Stalinkevičiutė

== Modern pentathlon ==
- Elžbieta Adomaitytė
- Aivaras Kazlas

== Rowing ==
Lithuania qualified one boat based on its performance at the 2017 World Rowing Junior Championships.

Athlete	Event	Heats		Repechage		Semifinals		Final	
Athlete	Event	Time	Rank	Time	Rank	Time	Rank	Time	Rank
Kamilė Kralikaitė; Vytautė Urbonaitė	Girls' Pairs								

Qualification Legend: FA=Final A (medal); FB=Final B (non-medal); FC=Final C (non-medal); FD=Final D (non-medal); SA/B=Semifinals A/B; SC/D=Semifinals C/D; R=Repechage

== Shooting ==
- Greta Rankelytė - Girls 10m Air Pistol

Individual

Athlete	Event	Qualification		Final	
Athlete	Event	Points	Rank	Points	Rank
Greta Rankelytė	Girls' 10 metre air pistol	562-12	5	110.4	8

Team

Athletes	Event	Qualification		Round of 16	Quarterfinals	Semifinals	Final / BM	Rank
Athletes	Event	Points	Rank	Opposition Result	Opposition Result	Opposition Result	Opposition Result	Rank
Greta Rankelytė (LTU); Kirill Ușanlî (MDA)	Mixed 10 metre air pistol	752-23	4	Lu (CHN); Vengríni (SVK); W 10-7	Bhaker (IND); Fayzullaev (TJK); L8-10	did not advance		

== Swimming ==
- Kotryna Teterevkova
- Agnė Šeleikaitė
- Alanas Tautkus
- Arijus Pavlidi

== Table tennis ==
Lithuania qualified one table tennis player based on its performance at the European Continental Qualifier.

- Boys' singles - Medardas Stankevičius

== Weightlifting ==
Athlete	Event	Snatch		Clean & Jerk		Total	Rank
Athlete	Event	Result	Rank	Result	Rank	Total	Rank
Žilvinas Žilinskas	−77 kg	109	7	130	7	239	7
