= Croatia at the 2018 Summer Youth Olympics =

- IOC code: CRO
- NOC: Croatian Olympic Committee
- Website: http://www.hoo.hr/

in Buenos Aires, Argentina 6 – 18 October 2018
- Competitors: 36 in 10 sports
- Medals Ranked 71st: Gold 0 Silver 1 Bronze 2 Total 3

Summer Youth Olympics appearances (overview)
- 2010; 2014; 2018

Croatia participated at the 2018 Summer Youth Olympics in Buenos Aires, Argentina from 6 October to 18 October 2018.

== Beach handball ==
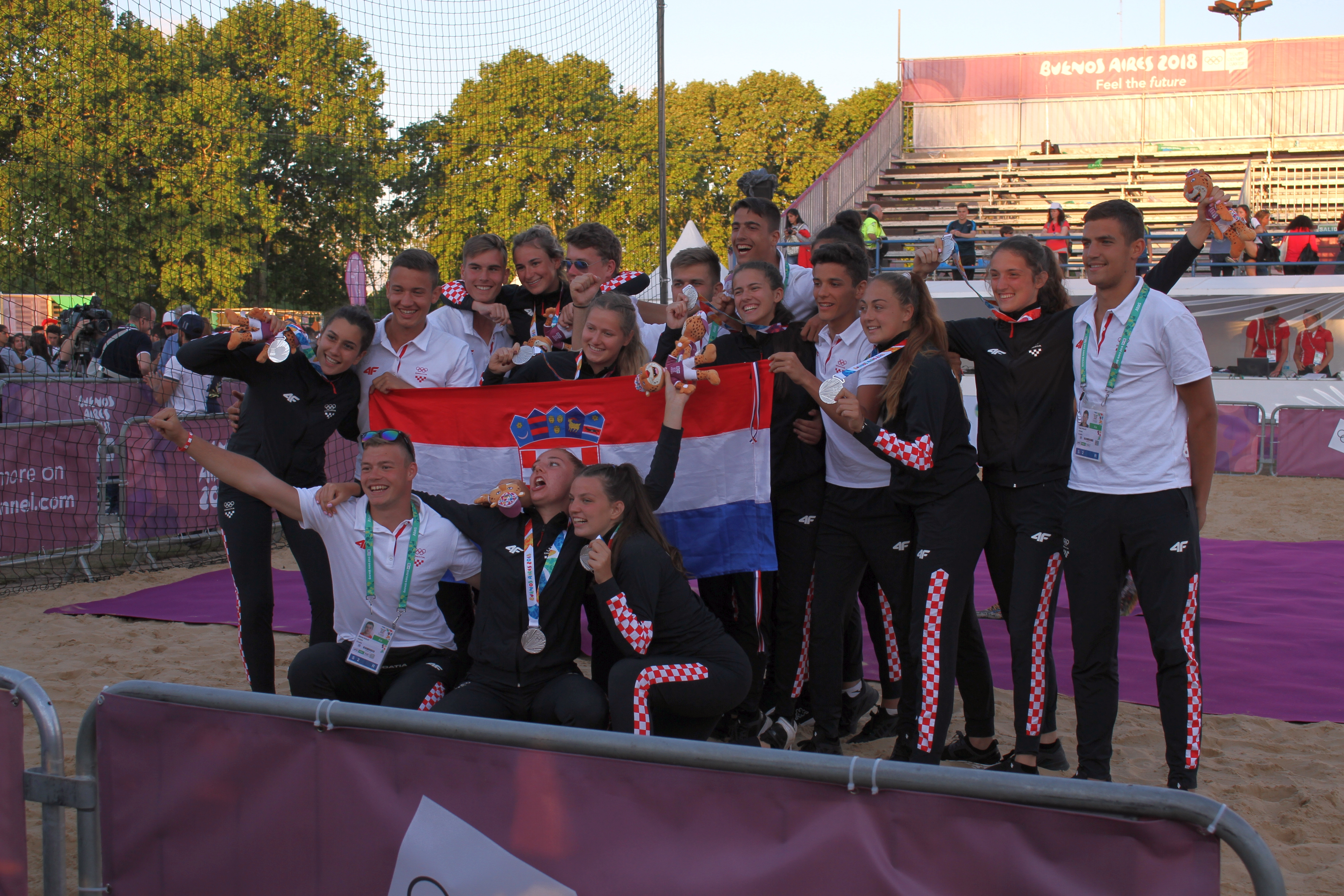
female and male Beach handball teams of Croatia celebrating the girls silver medail

== Judo ==
Individual

Athlete	Event	Round of 16	Quarterfinals	Semifinals	Rep 1	Rep 2	Rep 3	Final / BM	Rank
Athlete	Event	Opposition Result	Opposition Result	Opposition Result	Opposition Result	Opposition Result	Opposition Result	Opposition Result	Rank
Ana Viktorija Puljiz	Girls' 44 kg	Soniya Bhatta (NEP); W 10-00s3	Vusala Karimova (AZE); W 01-00s1	Tababi Devi Thangjam (IND); L 00s1-10	Bye			Mikaela Rojas (ARG); W 10-00s2	3rd place, bronze medalist(s)

Team

Athletes	Event	Round of 16	Quarterfinals	Semifinals	Final	
Athletes	Event	Opposition Result	Opposition Result	Opposition Result	Opposition Result	Rank
Team Beijing; Artsiom Kolasau (BLR); Liu Li-ling (TPE); Jaykhunbek Nazarov (UZB); Carlos Páez (VEN); Itzel Pecha (MEX); Ana Viktorija Puljiz (CRO); Veronica Toniolo (ITA)	Mixed team	Team Montreal (MIX); W 5–2	Team Nanjing (MIX); W 4–3	Team London (MIX); W 7–0	Team Athens (MIX); W 4–3	1st place, gold medalist(s)

== Rowing ==
Croatia qualified two boats based on its performance at the 2017 World Junior Rowing Championships.

- Boys' pair – Anton Loncaric, Patrik Loncaric
- Girls' pair – Izabela Krakic, Aria Cvitanovic

== Sailing ==
Croatia qualified one boat based on its performance at the 2018 IKA Twin Tip Racing Youth World Championship. Croatia also qualified one boat based on its performance at the Techno 293+ European Qualifier.

- Boys' IKA Twin Tip Racing - 1 boat
- Girls' Techno 293+ - 1 boat

== Shooting ==
Individual

Athlete	Event	Qualification		Final	
Athlete	Event	Points	Rank	Points	Rank
Marijana Matea Štrbac	Girls' 10m air pistol	558-7	11	did not advance	

Team

Athletes	Event	Qualification		Round of 16	Quarterfinals	Semifinals	Final / BM	
Athletes	Event	Points	Rank	Opposition Result	Opposition Result	Opposition Result	Opposition Result	Rank
Marijana Matea Štrbac (CRO); Abdul-Aziz Kurdzi (BLR)	Mixed 10m air pistol	754	2 Q	Babur (PAK); Chaudhary (IND); W 10–3	Al-Kaabi (IRQ); Son (BEL); L 5–10	did not advance		

== Table tennis ==
Croatia qualified one table tennis player based on its performance at the Road to Buenos Aires (Asia) series.

- Girls' singles - Andrea Pavlovic

== Taekwondo ==
Athlete	Event	Round of 16	Quarterfinals	Semifinals	Final	
Athlete	Event	Opposition Result	Opposition Result	Opposition Result	Opposition Result	Rank
Lena Stojković	Girls' 44 kg	Bye	Emina Gogebakan (TUR); W 17-3	Kang Mi-reu (KOR); L 13-16	did not advance	3rd place, bronze medalist(s)
Lucija Domić	Girls' 63 kg	Fanta Traoré (MLI); W 35-8	Nadica Božanić (SRB); L 7-13	did not advance		
Josip Teskera	Boys' 48 kg	Bye	Dmitrii Shishko (RUS); L 7-14	did not advance		

== Weightlifting ==
Athlete	Event	Snatch		Clean & jerk		Total	Rank
Athlete	Event	Result	Rank	Result	Rank	Total	Rank
Hermana Dermiček	Girls' +63 kg	65	10	81	9	146	9
