= Shahu Tushar Mane =

Indian sport shooter (born 2002)

Shahu Tushar Mane (born 26 January 2002) is an Indian sport shooter. He won the gold medal in the ISSF world cup 10m Air Pistol mixed event along with Mehuli Ghosh.
