= Lu Kaiman =

Chinese sport shooter

Personal information
- Nationality: Chinese
- Born: 11 March 2000 (age 26)

Sport
- Sport: Sports shooting
Medal record
Representing China
World Championships
Gold medal – first place	2022 Cairo	10 m air pistol
Gold medal – first place	2022 Cairo	10 m air pistol team
Asian Championships
Bronze medal – third place	2023 Changwon	10 m air pistol team

Lu Kaiman (born 11 March 2000) is a Chinese sports shooter. She won two gold medals in air pistol events at the 2022 ISSF World Shooting Championships.
