= Fatimah Abbas =

Iraqi sports shooter (born 2000)

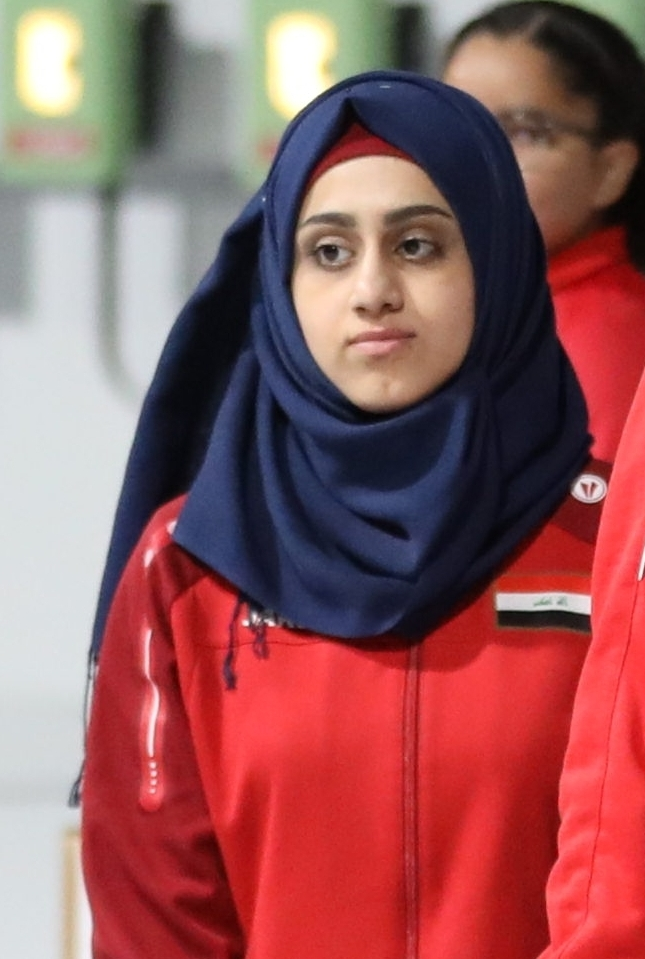
- Fatimah Abbas at the 2018 Summer Youth Olympics

Personal information
- Nationality: Iraqi
- Born: 23 April 2000 (age 25) Missan, Iraq

Sport
- Sport: Sports shooting

Fatimah Abbas Wuhayib Al-Kaabi (born 23 April 2000) is an Iraqi sports shooter. She was the flagbearer for Iraq at the opening ceremony of the 2020 Summer Olympics. She competed in the women's 10 metre air pistol event at the 2020 Olympics.
