= Namibia at the 2018 Summer Youth Olympics =

- IOC code: NAM
- NOC: Namibian National Olympic Committee
- Website: http://www.olympic.org.na/

in Buenos Aires, Argentina 6 – 18 October 2018
- Competitors: 11 in 3 sports
- Medals: Gold 0 Silver 0 Bronze 0 Total 0

Summer Youth Olympics appearances
- 2010; 2014; 2018; 2026

Namibia participated at the 2018 Summer Youth Olympics in Buenos Aires, Argentina from 6 October to 18 October 2018.

== Competitors ==
Sports	Boys	Girls	Total	Events
Archery	0	1	1	2
Field hockey	0	9	9	1
Gymnastics	0	1	1	2
Total	0	11	11	5

== Archery ==
Individual

Athlete	Event	Ranking round		Round of 32	Round of 16	Quarterfinals	Semifinals	Final / BM	Rank
Athlete	Event	Score	Seed	Opposition Score	Opposition Score	Opposition Score	Opposition Score	Opposition Score	Rank
Quinn Reddig	Girls' Individual	634	18	Jerez (DOM); W 6–5	Jones (NZL); L 3–7	did not advance			9

Team

Athletes	Event	Ranking round		Round of 32	Round of 16	Quarterfinals	Semifinals	Final / BM	Rank
Athletes	Event	Score	Seed	Opposition Score	Opposition Score	Opposition Score	Opposition Score	Opposition Score	Rank
Quinn Reddig (NAM); Trenton Cowles (USA)	Mixed team	1299	18	Voropayeva (KAZ); Benítez (PAR); W 6–0	Vázquez Cadena (MEX); Mustafin (KAZ); W 6–2	Kang (PRK); Vaca Cordero (MEX); W 6–2	Touraine-Helias (FRA); Solera (ESP); L 3–5	Jones (NZL); Tang (TPE); W 5–3	3rd place, bronze medalist(s)

== Field hockey ==
- Girls' tournament - 1 team of 9 athletes

=== Girls' tournament ===
Preliminary round

Pos	Team	Pld	W	D	L	GF	GA	GD	Pts	Qualification
1	China	5	5	0	0	29	1	+28	15	Quarterfinals
2	Australia	5	2	1	2	23	8	+15	7	Quarterfinals
3	Poland	5	2	1	2	4	14	−10	7	Quarterfinals
4	Namibia	5	1	2	2	9	17	−8	5	Quarterfinals
5	Zimbabwe	5	1	1	3	6	23	−17	4	9th place game
6	Mexico	5	0	3	2	5	13	−8	3	11th place game

Source: FIH
Rules for classification: 1) Points; 2) Goal difference; 3) Goals scored; 4) Head-to-head result.

7 October 2018
16:15

China	8–0	Namibia
Zou 3', 20'; Ma 5', 6', 6', 19'; Yu 6'; Zhang 15'	Report

Umpires:
Lize Strydom (RSA)
Cynthia Clement (GHA)

8 October 2018
11:00

Australia	3–4	Namibia
Lawton 7', 16'; Smith 18'	Report	Myburgh 1'; Cormack 4', 9' van Rooyen 10'

Umpires:
Victoria Pazos (PAR)
Margaux Brand (CAN)

9 October 2018
14:45

Mexico	2–2	Namibia
Gonzalez 6', 19'	Report	Cormack 3'; Myburgh 10'

Umpires:
Fatma Mahmoud (EGY)
Gemma Calderon Alcade (ESP)

10 October 2018
11:00

Namibia	0–1	Poland
	Report	Mazur 20'

Umpires:
Victoria Pazos (PAR)
Ayu Zainuddin (MAS)

11 October 2018
17:00

Namibia	3–3	Zimbabwe
Myburgh 4'; Schimming 15'; Cormack 15'	Report	A. Terblanche 9', 10'; Herbst 16'

Umpires:
Victoria Pazos (PAR)
Sophie Bockelmann (GER)

Quarter finals

12 October 2018
17:00

Argentina	3–0	Namibia
Rubenacker 2'; Bruggesser 8', 20'	Report

Umpires:
Sophie Bockelmann (GER)
Margaux Brand (CAN)

Crossover

13 October 2018
11:00

Namibia	1–5	Australia
Myburgh 9'	Report	Schonell 2', 6'; Smith 5', 9'; Duncan 11'

Umpires:
Jianjun Chen (CHN)
Ayu Zainuddin (MAS)

Seventh and eighth place

14 October 2018
09:30

Namibia	1–3	Poland
Cormack 15'	Report	Balcerzak 5'; Zimmermann 15', 20'

Umpires:
Margaux Brand (CAN)
Cynthia Clement (GHA)

== Gymnastics ==
=== Trampoline ===
Namibia qualified one gymnast based on its performance at the 2018 African Junior Championship.

- Girls' trampoline - 1 quota

Athlete	Event	Qualification				Final	
Athlete	Event	Routine 1	Routine 2	Total	Rank	Score	Rank
Thalia Loveira	Girls	38.690	44.840	83.530	11	did not advance	

=== Multidiscipline ===
Team	Athlete	Acrobatic	Artistic	Rhythmic	Trampoline	Total points	Rank
Team Marina Chernova (Light Green)	Arina Yulusheva (UZB); Nikolay Evdokimov (UZB)	30	—N/a			492	12
Team Marina Chernova (Light Green)	Nguyễn Văn Khánh Phong (VIE)	—N/a	48	—N/a		492	12
Team Marina Chernova (Light Green)	Vlada Raković (SRB)	—N/a	61	—N/a		492	12
Team Marina Chernova (Light Green)	Oļegs Ivanovs (LAT)	—N/a	55	—N/a		492	12
Team Marina Chernova (Light Green)	Lisa Conradie (RSA)	—N/a	59	—N/a		492	12
Team Marina Chernova (Light Green)	Olivia Araujo (ARG)	—N/a	18	—N/a		492	12
Team Marina Chernova (Light Green)	Emma Slevin (IRL)	—N/a	33	—N/a		492	12
Team Marina Chernova (Light Green)	Lee So-yun (KOR)	—N/a		57	—N/a	492	12
Team Marina Chernova (Light Green)	Jennifer Rivera (COL)	—N/a		86	—N/a	492	12
Team Marina Chernova (Light Green)	Antonella Genuzio (BOL)	—N/a		20	—N/a	492	12
Team Marina Chernova (Light Green)	Ivan Litvinovich (BLR)	—N/a			2	492	12
Team Marina Chernova (Light Green)	Thalia Loveira (NAM)	—N/a			23	492	12
