= Taekwondo at the 2018 Summer Youth Olympics – Girls' 44 kg =

Taekwondo competition

Girls' 44kg at the III Summer Youth Olympic Games
- Venue: Oceania Pavilion
- Date: 7 October
- Competitors: 10 from 10 nations

Medalists
1st place, gold medalist(s)		Polina Shcherbakova	Russia
2nd place, silver medalist(s)		Kang Mi-reu	South Korea
3rd place, bronze medalist(s)		Alicia Rodríguez	Mexico
3rd place, bronze medalist(s)		Lena Stojković	Croatia

The girls' 44 kg competition at the 2018 Summer Youth Olympics was held on 7 October at the Oceania Pavilion.

== Schedule ==
All times are in local time (UTC-3).

Date	Time	Round
Sunday, 7 October 2018	14:00; 14:45; 19:00; 20:00	Round of 16; Quarterfinals; Semifinals; Final

== Bracket ==
Round of 16
9	Assel Usmanova (KAZ)	14
8	Minaya Akbarova (AZE)	9
7	Mahla Momenzadeh (IRI)	32
10	Safa Ismael Aden (DJI)	0

Quarterfinals
1	Polina Shcherbakova (RUS)	15
9	Assel Usmanova (KAZ)	1
5	Alicia Rodríguez (MEX)	23
4	Milagros Cali (ARG)	3
3	Lena Stojković (CRO)	17
6	Emine Göğebakan (TUR)	3
7	Mahla Momenzadeh (IRI)	14
2	Kang Mi-reu (KOR)	15

Semifinals
1	Polina Shcherbakova (RUS)	6
5	Alicia Rodríguez (MEX)	3
3	Lena Stojković (CRO)	13
2	Kang Mi-reu (KOR)	16

Gold medal match
1	Polina Shcherbakova (RUS)	12
2	Kang Mi-reu (KOR)	6
