= Myanmar at the 2018 Summer Youth Olympics =

- IOC code: MYA
- NOC: Myanmar Olympic Committee

in Buenos Aires, Argentina 6 – 18 October 2018
- Competitors: 2 in 2 sports
- Medals: Gold 0 Silver 0 Bronze 0 Total 0

Summer Youth Olympics appearances
- 2010; 2014; 2018; 2026

Myanmar participated at the 2018 Summer Youth Olympics in Buenos Aires, Argentina from 6 October to 18 October 2018.

== Competitors ==
Sport	Boy	Girl	Total
Archery	0	1	1
Sailing	1	0	1
Total	1	1	2

== Archery ==
Individual

Athlete	Event	Ranking round		Round of 32	Round of 16	Quarterfinals	Semifinals	Final / BM	Rank
Athlete	Event	Score	Seed	Opposition Score	Opposition Score	Opposition Score	Opposition Score	Opposition Score	Rank
Hnin Pyae Sone	Girls' Individual	628	24	Amr Said Mohamed Azzam (EGY); W 6–5	Kharitonova (RUS); W 6–5	Zhang (CHN); L 0–6	did not advance		6

Team

Athletes	Event	Ranking round		Round of 32	Round of 16	Quarterfinals	Semifinals	Final / BM	Rank
Athletes	Event	Score	Seed	Opposition Score	Opposition Score	Opposition Score	Opposition Score	Opposition Score	Rank
Hnin Pyae Sone (MYA); Samet Ak (TUR)	Mixed team	1300	12	Rahmani (IRI); Cadena (COL); W 6–0	Jones (NZL); Tang (TPE); L 1–5	did not advance			9

== Sailing ==
Myanmar was given one boat to compete by the tripartite committee.

Boys

Athlete	Event	Race													Total Points	Net Points	Final Rank
Athlete	Event	1	2	3	4	5	6	7	8	9	10	11	12	M*	Total Points	Net Points	Final Rank
Thi Htoo Saw Thaw	Techno 293+	19	24	(25); DNF	25; DNC	CAN	25; DNF	25; DSQ	25; DNF	25; UFD	25; DNF	25; DNC	25; DNC	24	292	267	24
