= Archery at the 2018 Summer Youth Olympics – Girls' individual =

Girls' individual at the III Summer Youth Olympic Games
- Venue: Parque Sarmiento
- Dates: 12–16 October 2018
- Competitors: 32 from 32 nations

Medalists
1st place, gold medalist(s)		Zhang Mengyao	China
2nd place, silver medalist(s)		Elia Canales	Spain
3rd place, bronze medalist(s)		Son Ye-ryeong	South Korea

The girls' individual archery event at the 2018 Summer Youth Olympics was held from 12 to 16 October 2018 at the Parque Sarmiento in Buenos Aires, Argentina. One of three recurve archery events which comprised the archery programme, it was the third time the girls' individual discipline had been contested at Summer Youth Olympics. Thirty-two archers from thirty-two countries entered the competition, which was open to female archers born between 1 January 2001 and 31 December 2003. The defending champion was China's Li Jiaman, who was unable to defend her title due to the age limitations imposed on the event.

Zhang Mengyao of China won the gold medal, becoming the second female Chinese archer to become Youth Olympic champion. Zhang defeated Spain's Elia Canales by six set points to two in the final, the Spaniard taking home the silver medal as the runner-up. Son Ye-ryeong of South Korea won the bronze medal ahead of Mexico's Valentina Vázquez Cadena.

== Qualification ==
A total of thirty-two places were available for the event, with each National Olympic Committee (NOC) limited to one entry each. As host nation Argentina automatically qualified its sole entry. A tournament held in parallel with the 2017 World Youth Archery Championships was the primary method of qualification for the remaining thirty-one places, offering sixteen to the sixteen highest-placed athletes in the competition. Eleven places were awarded through five continental youth championships, with the European, Asian, and American championships each offering three spots and those of African and Oceania offering two and one places respectively. The final four positions were available as 'universality places', awarded to NOCs underrepresented at the Olympic Games in line with the universal representation ethos of the Olympic Charter.

=== National selections ===
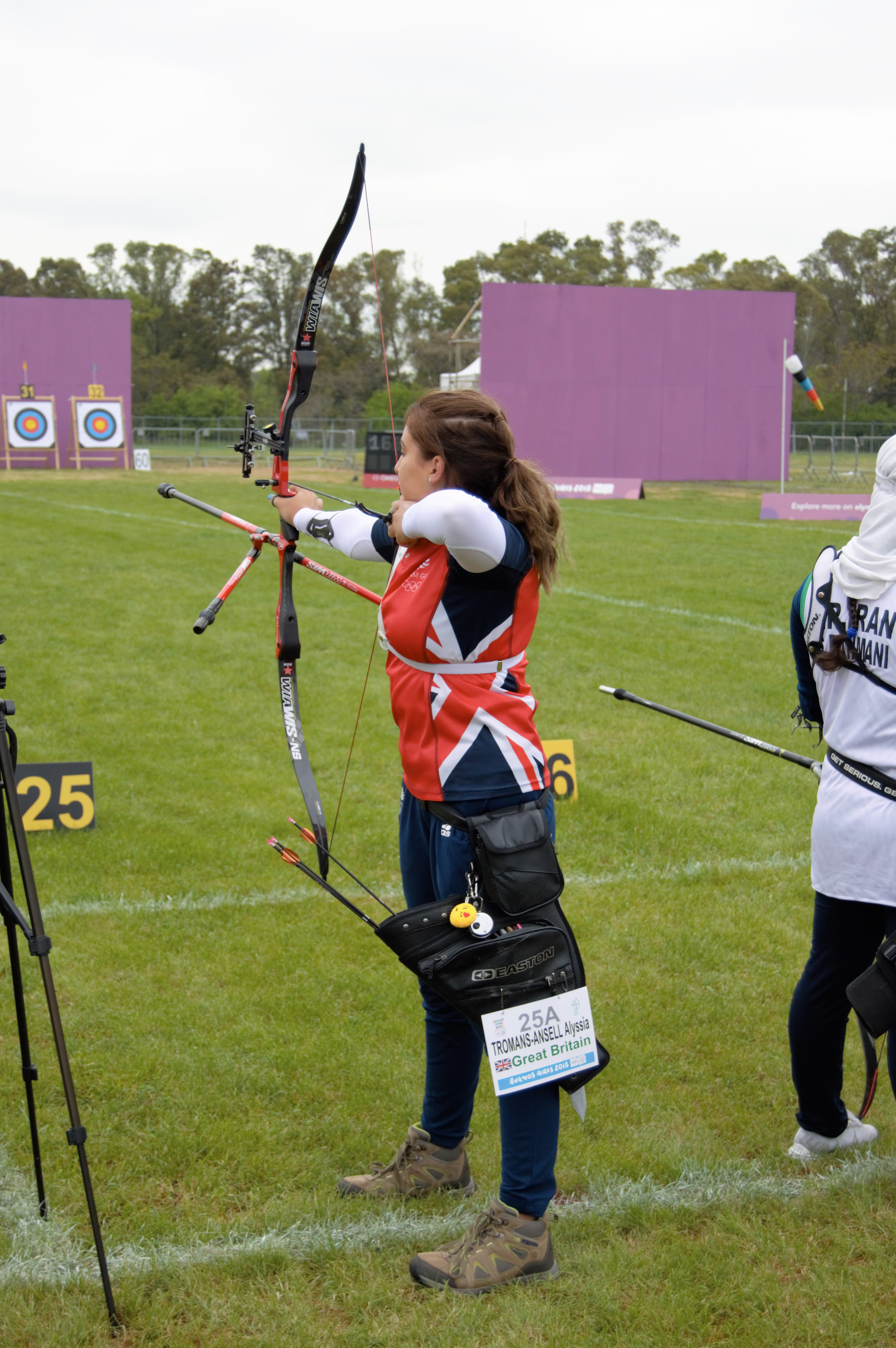
Alyssia Tromans-Ansell (pictured at the Games) won the event's primary qualifying tournament.

Each NOC was free to select its representative for the event according to its own criteria, irrespective of the archer who won the position at any one of the qualifying tournaments. Many NOCs nevertheless chose the archers that won the qualifying place. Great Britain announced the selection of Alyssia Tromans-Ansell as part of its national squad in September 2018. Tromans-Ansell, who was coached by four-time Olympian Naomi Folkard and had switched from gymnastics aged 11 after a severe allergic reaction, had won the qualifying tournament held with the World Youth Archery Championships in 2017. 17-year old Himani was likewise chosen by India after her third-placed finish at the qualifying tournament, as was Spain's three-time national cadet champion Èlia Canales, who had finished in ninth. Rebecca Jones, who was inspired to take up archery by The Hunger Games series, was selected for New Zealand's national delegation in August 2018 following her qualification-winning performance at the World Archery Oceania Championships in New Caledonia.

Mexico chose 15-year old Valentina Vázquez Cadena for her third international tournament, Vázquez herself inspired to take up archery following the bronze medal victory of Mariana Avitia at the 2012 Summer Olympics. Laura van der Winkel, the winner of the 2018 Dutch national indoor championship at age sixteen, was entered by the Netherlands after she topped a national selection procedure held during the 2018 European Youth Championships.

== Format ==
An official World Archery target is 122cm wide and is divided into ten evenly-spaced concentric rings. Shooting an arrow into the outermost ring scores one point; landing in the centre yellow circle earns the maximum ten points.

The girls' individual recurve event was an outdoor recurve target archery event held according to World Archery-approved rules. From a distance of 60 metres each archer at a 122 cm-wide target, with between one and ten points being awarded for each arrow depending on how close it landed to the centre of the target. The competition took place over two days, an initial ranking round being followed by a single-elimination tournament consisting of five rounds. Two final matches determining the winners of the gold, silver, and bronze medals concluded the event.

The ranking round was held on 12 October and determined the seeds for the elimination rounds. Each of the thirty-two archers shot a total of 72 arrows, the archer scoring the highest total from her 72 arrows receiving the number one seed, the archer with the second highest total receiving second seed, and so on. In the event of a tie between two or more archers, the number of arrows shot in the central 10-ring of the target was taken into account, with the number of arrows shot within the inner-10 (or X) ring used as a second tiebreaker if necessary.

The format of the elimination and medal-deciding rounds followed the Archery Olympic Round set system. The elimination rounds began on 15 October with the 1/16 round and continued into the following day, 16 October, with the bronze and gold medal finals following afterwards. Each match consisted of a maximum of five sets, with archers each shooting three arrows per set. The archer with the greater score from their three arrows won the set, earning two set points. The archer with the lower score in each set received zero points. If the score was tied, each archer received one point. The first archer to reach six set points was declared the winner. If the match was tied at five set points each after the maximum five sets were played, a single tie-breaker arrow was used with the closest to centre of the target winning. In the event both archers shot into the central 10 ring in the first tiebreaker, a second single tie-breaker arrow was used.

== Report ==
=== Ranking round ===
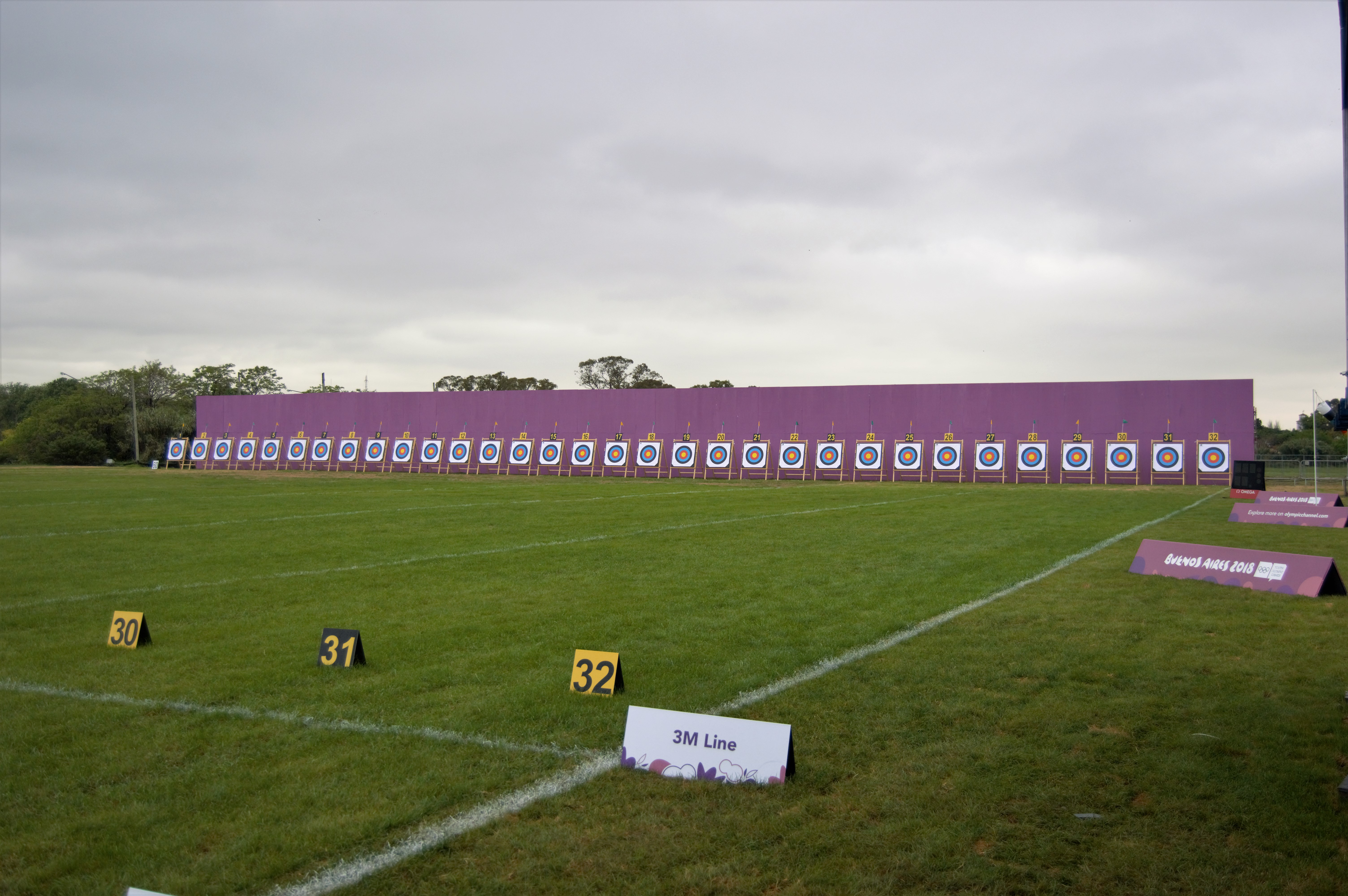
Parc Sarmiento as it appeared on the day of the ranking round.

The ranking round on 12 October was headed by China's Zhang Mengyao, who scored a personal best of 675 points – out of a maximum of 720 – from her 72 arrows to claim the top seed for the elimination rounds. Japan's Ruka Uehara finished second with 667 points ahead of third-placed Himani of India on 665 points. Speaking to the media afterwards, Zhang stated that although she was satisfied with her performance she was not going to enter the knockout rounds feeling complacent about having placing first.

=== Elimination rounds ===
New Zealand's Rebecca Jones delivered an upset in the opening elimination round, held on 15 October, the thirty-first seed defeating second seed Uehara after a one arrow shoot-off was decided in Jones' favour. The 1/16 round also saw Tromans-Ansell mount a recovery over the Philippines' Nicole Tagle, coming from two sets down to win six set points to four. Tagle's defeat ended the Philippines' participation in the Games. Both Tromans-Ansell and Jones were eliminated by seventh seed Valentina Vázquez Cadena in the 1/8 and quarter-final rounds respectively, the Mexican reaching the semi-finals to face Spain's Elia Canales. Canales herself had finished eleventh in the ranking round with 645 points and showed improving form over the course of her three knockout matches, which included victory over sixth seed Clea Reisenweber of Germany, to progress to the semi-finals.

Zhang meanwhile averaged twenty-eight points per set in her journey to the gold medal final, comfortably defeating Mst Radia Akther Shapla of Bangladesh, Kazakhstan's Alexandra Voropayeva, and Myanmar's Pyae Sone Hnin to advance to the semi-finals. There she met fourth seed Son Ye-ryeong of South Korea, who had not conceded a single set in her three elimination round matches. Son led after three sets before Zhang outscored the Korean twice in succession to clinch the fourth and fifth sets and narrowly progress to the final.

=== Medal matches ===
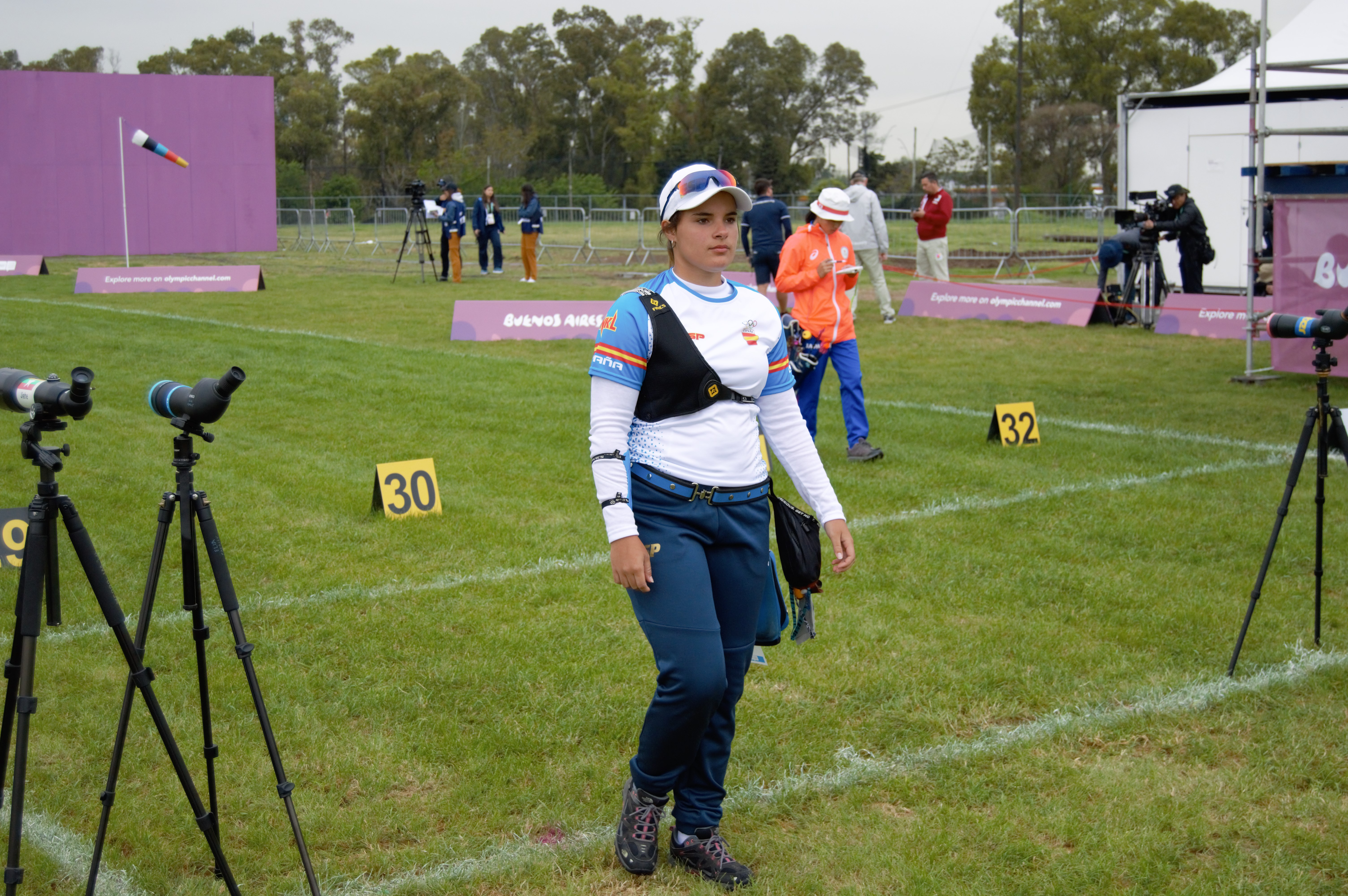
Spain's Elia Canales won silver medal.

As the two losing archers from the semi-finals, Vázquez Cadena and Son met to contest the bronze medal final. After three close sets — the pair each posting a twenty-seven and a pair of twenty-eight scores — Vázquez Cadena managed just twenty-three points from her three arrows in the fourth set. This drop in performance allowed Son to take the lead and break away, the South Korean claiming the fifth set soon afterwards to secure the bronze medal.

In the gold medal final Zhang and Canales started off the match on an equal footing, both scoring twenty-six points to tie the first set. A seven by Canales however allowed Zhang to take the second set, and after another tie in the third set Canales shot wide again into the seven ring again in the fourth. With a score of twenty-seven points to twenty-five Zhang clinched the set and secured the gold medal. Zhang's victory was China's second girls' individual gold medal in succession following Li Jiaman's victory at the previous Summer Youth Olympics. Canales' silver medal was the third achieved by Spain that day.

== Results ==
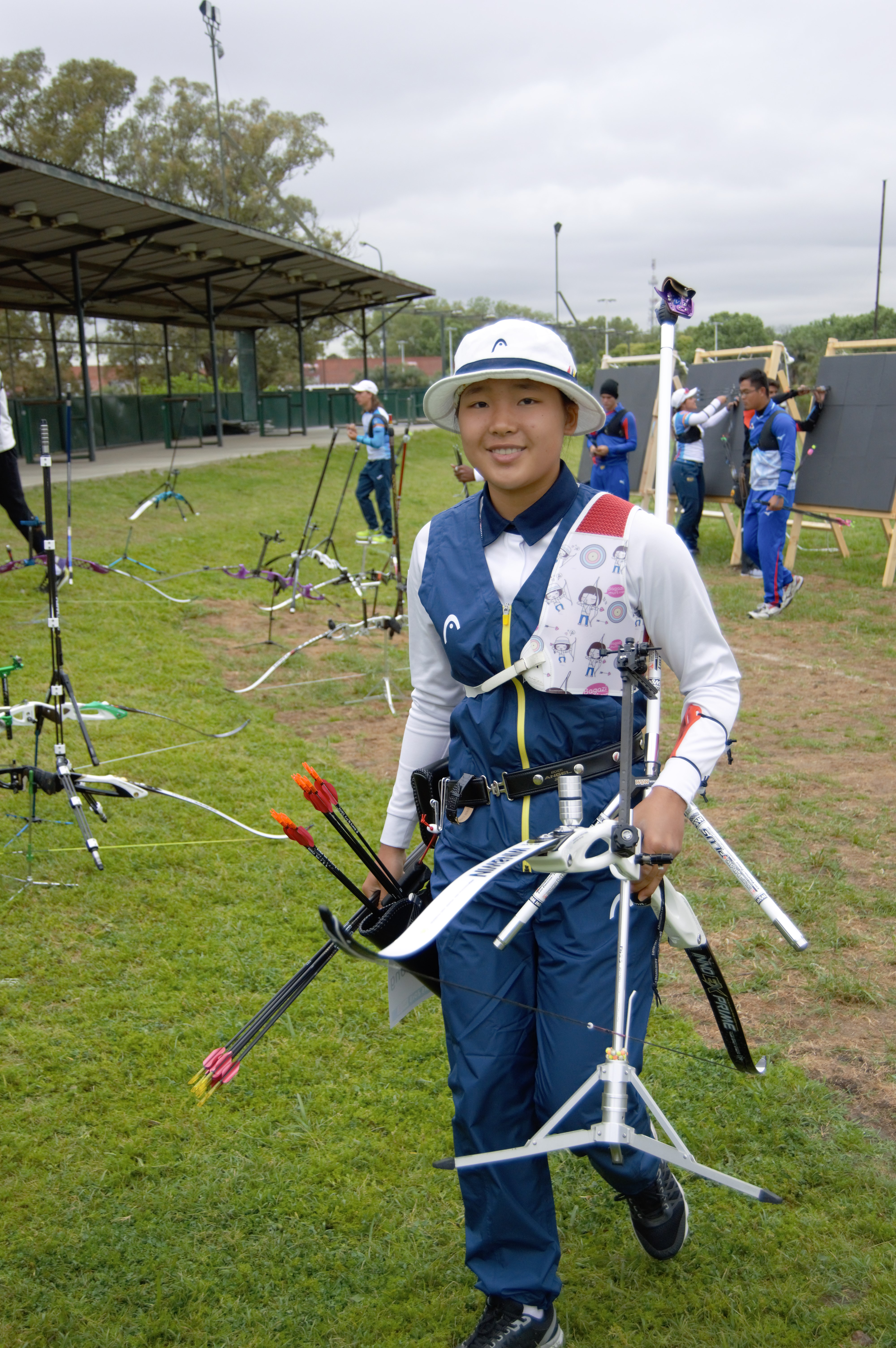
South Korea's Son Ye-ryeong won the bronze medal.

=== Ranking round ===
Rank	Archer	Half		Score	10s	Xs
Rank	Archer	1st	2nd	Score	10s	Xs
1	Zhang Mengyao (CHN)	336	339	675	36	11
2	Ruka Uehara (JPN)	335	332	667	31	12
3	Himani Himani (IND)	330	335	665	27	8
4	Son Ye-ryeong (KOR)	333	330	663	30	14
5	Chang Rong-jia (TPE)	326	336	662	31	6
6	Clea Reisenweber (GER)	324	335	659	24	8
7	Valentina Vázquez Cadena (MEX)	331	328	659	23	4
8	Viktoria Kharitonova (RUS)	324	334	658	29	12
9	Nada Amr Said Mohamed Azzam (EGY)	321	337	658	26	6
10	Alyssia Tromans-Ansell (GBR)	331	321	652	25	9
11	Elia Canales (ESP)	313	332	645	22	8
12	Kyla Touraine-Helias (FRA)	314	330	644	19	7
13	Zhanna Naumova (UKR)	326	316	642	21	5
14	Catalina GNoriega (USA)	320	322	642	18	7
15	Stefany Jerez (DOM)	321	318	639	22	7
16	Milena Gațco (MDA)	314	324	638	18	4
17	Alexandra Voropayeva (KAZ)	318	319	637	16	6
18	Quinn Reddig (NAM)	312	322	634	21	4
19	Isabella Bassi (CHI)	310	321	631	21	8
20	Sogand Rahmani (IRI)	316	315	631	19	9
21	Agustina Sofia Giannasio (ARG)	317	313	630	19	6
22	Laura Paeglis (AUS)	319	310	629	21	6
23	Nicole Marie Tagle (PHI)	320	309	629	17	7
24	Hnin Pyae Sone (MYA)	316	312	628	17	3
25	Ana Luiza Sliachticas Caetano (BRA)	320	305	625	23	5
26	Laura van der Winkel (NED)	318	305	623	19	3
27	Liliya Trydvornava (BLR)	306	313	619	9	5
28	Selin Satır (TUR)	315	302	617	21	9
29	Kang Jin-hwa (PRK)	304	304	608	13	4
30	Jil Walter (SAM)	288	302	590	14	5
31	Rebecca Jones (NZL)	299	288	587	14	4
32	Mst Radia Akther Shapla (BAN)	283	297	580	8	4

=== Elimination rounds ===
==== Section 1 ====
1/16 eliminations
1	Zhang Mengyao (CHN)	6
32	Mst Radia Akther Shapla (BAN)	0
17	Alexandra Voropayeva (KAZ)	6
16	Milena Gațco (MDA)	4
9	Nada Amr Said Mohamed Azzam (EGY)	5
24	Hnin Pyae Sone (MYA)	6*
25	Ana Luiza Sliachticas Caetano (BRA)	4
8	Viktoria Kharitonova (RUS)	6

1/8 eliminations
1	Zhang Mengyao (CHN)	7
17	Alexandra Voropayeva (KAZ)	1
24	Hnin Pyae Sone (MYA)	6*
8	Viktoria Kharitonova (RUS)	5

Quarter finals
1	Zhang Mengyao (CHN)	6
24	Hnin Pyae Sone (MYA)	0

==== Section 2 ====
1/16 eliminations
5	Chang Rong-jia (TPE)	6
28	Selin Satır (TUR)	4
21	Agustina Sofia Giannasio (ARG)	3
12	Kyla Touraine-Helias (FRA)	7
13	Zhanna Naumova (UKR)	6
20	Sogand Rahmani (IRI)	2
29	Kang Jin-hwa (PRK)	0
4	Son Ye-ryeong (KOR)	6

1/8 eliminations
5	Chang Rong-jia (TPE)	6
12	Kyla Touraine-Helias (FRA)	2
13	Zhanna Naumova (UKR)	0
4	Son Ye-ryeong (KOR)	6

Quarter finals
5	Chang Rong-jia (TPE)	0
4	Son Ye-ryeong (KOR)	6

==== Section 3 ====
1/16 eliminations
3	Himani Himani (IND)	7
30	Jil Walter (SAM)	1
19	Isabella Bassi (CHI)	5
14	Catalina GNoriega (USA)	6*
11	Elia Canales (ESP)	6
22	Laura Paeglis (AUS)	2
27	Liliya Trydvornava (BLR)	0
6	Clea Reisenweber (GER)	6

1/8 eliminations
3	Himani Himani (IND)	4
14	Catalina GNoriega (USA)	6
11	Elia Canales (ESP)	6
6	Clea Reisenweber (GER)	2

Quarter finals
14	Catalina GNoriega (USA)	3
11	Elia Canales (ESP)	7

==== Section 4 ====
1/16 eliminations
7	Valentina Vázquez Cadena (MEX)	6
26	Laura van der Winkel (NED)	2
23	Nicole Marie Tagle (PHI)	4
10	Alyssia Tromans-Ansell (GBR)	6
15	Stefany Jerez (DOM)	5
18	Quinn Reddig (NAM)	6*
31	Rebecca Jones (NZL)	6*
2	Ruka Uehara (JPN)	5

1/8 eliminations
7	Valentina Vázquez Cadena (MEX)	7
10	Alyssia Tromans-Ansell (GBR)	1
18	Quinn Reddig (NAM)	3
31	Rebecca Jones (NZL)	7

Quarter finals
7	Valentina Vázquez Cadena (MEX)	6
31	Rebecca Jones (NZL)	0

- Note: An asterisk (*) denotes a win from a one-arrow shoot-off
  Source:

=== Finals ===
Semi-finals
1	Zhang Mengyao (CHN)	6	27	26	26	27	29
4	Son Ye-ryeong (KOR)	4	26	27	27	26	27
11	Elia Canales (ESP)	6	23	26	26	27	29
7	Valentina Vázquez Cadena (MEX)	4	27	25	28	26	28

Gold medal match
1	Zhang Mengyao (CHN) (gold)	6	26	27	28	27
11	Elia Canales (ESP) (silver)	2	26	25	28	25
Bronze medal match
4	Son Ye-ryeong (KOR) (bronze)	7	28	27	28	28	27
7	Valentina Vázquez Cadena (MEX)	3	28	28	27	23	25

== See also ==
- Archery at the 2019 Summer Universiade – Women's individual recurve
- Archery at the 2020 Summer Olympics – Women's individual
