= Ivory Coast at the 2018 Summer Youth Olympics =

- IOC code: CIV
- NOC: Comité National Olympique de Côte d'Ivoire

in Buenos Aires, Argentina 6 – 18 October 2018
- Competitors: 3 in 3 sports
- Medals: Gold 0 Silver 0 Bronze 0 Total 0

Summer Youth Olympics appearances
- 2010; 2014; 2018; 2026

Ivory Coast participated at the 2018 Summer Youth Olympics in Buenos Aires, Argentina from 6 October to 18 October 2018.

== Competitors ==
Sport	Boy	Girl	Total
Archery	1	0	1
Athletics	1	0	1
Taekwondo	0	1	1
Total	2	1	3

== Archery ==
Individual

Athlete	Event	Ranking round		Round of 32	Round of 16	Quarterfinals	Semifinals	Final / BM	Rank
Athlete	Event	Score	Seed	Opposition Score	Opposition Score	Opposition Score	Opposition Score	Opposition Score	Rank
Franck Eyeni	Boys' Individual	658	20	David Cadena (COL); L 4–6	did not advance				

Team

Athletes	Event	Ranking round		Round of 32	Round of 16	Quarterfinals	Semifinals	Final / BM	Rank
Athletes	Event	Score	Seed	Opposition Score	Opposition Score	Opposition Score	Opposition Score	Opposition Score	Rank
Zhanna Naumova (UKR); Franck Eyeni (CIV)	Mixed team	1300	14	Canales (ESP); Aoshima (JPN); W 5–4	Kharitonova (RUS); Rezowan (BAN); L 4–5	did not advance			9

== Athletics ==
Athlete	Event	Stage 1		Stage 2		Final Placing
Athlete	Event	Result	Rank	Result	Rank	Final Placing
Gnanzou Desire Kodjo	Men's 400m	50.47	13	51.11	17	16

== Taekwondo ==
Athlete	Event	Round of 16	Quarterfinals	Semifinals	Final / BM	
Athlete	Event	Opposition Result	Opposition Result	Opposition Result	Opposition Result	Rank
Koumba Ibo	Girls' 63 kg	Petra Štolbová (CZE); L 16-27	did not advance			
