= North Korea at the 2018 Summer Youth Olympics =

- IOC code: PRK
- NOC: Olympic Committee of the Democratic People's Republic of Korea

in Buenos Aires, Argentina 6 – 18 October 2018
- Competitors: 5 in 4 sports
- Medals: Gold 0 Silver 0 Bronze 0 Total 0

Summer Youth Olympics appearances
- 2010; 2014; 2018

North Korea participated at the 2018 Summer Youth Olympics in Buenos Aires, Argentina from 6 October to 18 October 2018.

== Archery ==
North Korea qualified one archer based on its performance at the Asian Continental Qualification Tournament.

Individual

Athlete	Event	Ranking round		Round of 32	Round of 16	Quarterfinals	Semifinals	Final / BM	Rank
Athlete	Event	Score	Seed	Opposition Score	Opposition Score	Opposition Score	Opposition Score	Opposition Score	Rank
Kang Jin-hwa	Girls' Individual	608	29	Son (KOR); L 0–6	did not advance				17

Team

Athletes	Event	Ranking round		Round of 32	Round of 16	Quarterfinals	Semifinals	Final / BM	Rank
Athletes	Event	Score	Seed	Opposition Score	Opposition Score	Opposition Score	Opposition Score	Opposition Score	Rank
Kang Jin-hwa (PRK); Carlos Daniel Vaca Cordero (MEX)	Mixed team	1288	26	GNoriega (USA); Rodríguez Valero (CUB); W 6–0	Trydvornava (BLR); Ovchynnikov (UKR); W 5–1	Reddig (NAM); Cowles (USA); L 2–6	did not advance		5

== Gymnastics ==
=== Rhythmic ===
North Korea qualified one gymnast based on its performance at the 2018 Asian Junior Championship.

- Girls' rhythmic individual all-around - 1 quota

== Table tennis ==
North Korea qualified two table tennis players based on its performance at the Road to Buenos Aires (North America) series.

- Boys' singles - Kim Song-gun
- Girls' singles - Pyon Song-gyong

== Weightlifting ==
North Korea qualified one athlete based on its performance at the 2017 World Youth Championships.

Athlete	Event	Snatch		Clean & jerk		Total	Rank
Athlete	Event	Result	Rank	Result	Rank	Total	Rank
Song Kuk-hyang	Girls' -63 kg	NM		DNF			
