= Archery at the 2018 Summer Youth Olympics – Mixed team =

Mixed team archery at the III Summer Youth Olympic Games
- Venue: Parque Sarmiento
- Dates: 12–14 October
- Competitors: 64 from 44 nations

Medalists
| 1st place, gold medalist(s) | | Kyla Touraine-Helias; Jose Manuel Solera | Mixed-NOCs |
| 2nd place, silver medalist(s) | | Agustina Sofia Giannasio; Aitthiwat Soithong | Mixed-NOCs |
| 3rd place, bronze medalist(s) | | Quinn Reddig; Trenton Cowles | Mixed-NOCs |

These are the results for the mixed team event at the 2018 Summer Youth Olympics.

== Results ==
=== Ranking round ===
| Rank | Archers | Score |
|---|---|---|
| 1 | Nada Amr Said Mohamed Azzam (EGY); Matthias Potrafke (GER) | 1309 |
| 2 | Valentina Vázquez Cadena (MEX); Alikhan Mustafin (KAZ) | 1305 |
| 3 | Viktoria Kharitonova (RUS); Md Ibrahim Sheik Rezowan (BAN) | 1305 |
| 4 | Alyssia Tromans-Ansell (GBR); Reza Shabani (IRI) | 1305 |
| 5 | Clea Reisenweber (GER); Federico Fabrizzi (ITA) | 1305 |
| 6 | Ana Luiza Sliachticas Caetano (BRA); Senna Roos (BEL) | 1302 |
| 7 | Catalina GNoriega (USA); Hazael Jesus Rodríguez Valero (CUB) | 1302 |
| 8 | Laura van der Winkel (NED); Stanislav Cheremiskin (RUS) | 1301 |
| 9 | Stefany Jerez (DOM); Mateus de Carvalho Almeida (BRA) | 1301 |
| 10 | Milena Gațco (MDA); Jason Hurnall (AUS) | 1301 |
| 11 | Kyla Touraine-Helias (FRA); Jose Manuel Solera (ESP) | 1301 |
| 12 | Hnin Pyae Sone (MYA); Samet Ak (TUR) | 1300 |
| 13 | Nicole Marie Tagle (PHI); Hendrik Õun (EST) | 1300 |
| 14 | Zhanna Naumova (UKR); Franck Eyeni (CIV) | 1300 |
| 15 | Alexandra Voropayeva (KAZ); Alejandro Benítez (PAR) | 1300 |
| 16 | Agustina Sofia Giannasio (ARG); Aitthiwat Soithong (THA) | 1299 |
| 17 | Laura Paeglis (AUS); Youssof Tolba (EGY) | 1299 |
| 18 | Quinn Reddig (NAM); Trenton Cowles (USA) | 1299 |
| 19 | Èlia Canales (ESP); Tetsuya Aoshima (JPN) | 1299 |
| 20 | Isabella Bassi (CHI); Ravien Dalpatadu (SRI) | 1298 |
| 21 | Sogand Rahmani (IRI); David Cadena (COL) | 1298 |
| 22 | Chang Rong-jia (TPE); Benjamen Lee (CAN) | 1298 |
| 23 | Liliya Trydvornava (BLR); Artem Ovchynnikov (UKR) | 1298 |
| 24 | Selin Satır (TUR); Akash Akash (IND) | 1296 |
| 25 | Son Ye-ryeong (KOR); Dan Thompson (GBR) | 1293 |
| 26 | Kang Jin-hwa (PRK); Carlos Daniel Vaca Cordero (MEX) | 1288 |
| 27 | Jil Walter (SAM); Feng Hao (CHN) | 1278 |
| 28 | Rebecca Jones (NZL); Tang Chih-chun (TPE) | 1276 |
| 29 | Himani Himani (IND); Wian Roux (RSA) | 1274 |
| 30 | Ruka Uehara (JPN); Louis Gino Aurelien Juhel (MRI) | 1273 |
| 31 | Mst Radia Akther Shapla (BAN); Song In-jun (KOR) | 1271 |
| 32 | Zhang Mengyao (CHN); Leonardo Tura (SMR) | 1259 |

=== Elimination rounds ===
==== Finals ====
Semi-finals
16 | Agustina Sofia Giannasio (ARG); Aitthiwat Soithong (THA) | 2 | 2 | 2
28 | Rebecca Jones (NZL); Tang Chih-chun (TPE) | 0 | 0 | 0
11 | Kyla Touraine-Helias (FRA); Jose Manuel Solera (ESP) | 1 | 0 | 2 | 2
18 | Quinn Reddig (NAM); Trenton Cowles (USA) | 1 | 2 | 0 | 0

Gold medal match
16 | Agustina Sofia Giannasio (ARG); Aitthiwat Soithong (THA) | 1 | 0 | 0
11 | Kyla Touraine-Helias (FRA); Jose Manuel Solera (ESP) | 1 | 2 | 2
Bronze medal match
28 | Rebecca Jones (NZL); Tang Chih-chun (TPE) | 2 | 1 | 0 | 0
18 | Quinn Reddig (NAM); Trenton Cowles (USA) | 0 | 1 | 2 | 2

==== Top half ====
===== Section 1 =====
1st round
1 | Nada Amr Said Mohamed Azzam (EGY); Matthias Potrafke (GER) | 2 | 2 | 1
32 | Zhang Mengyao (CHN); Leonardo Tura (SMR) | 0 | 0 | 1
17 | Laura Paeglis (AUS); Youssof Tolba (EGY) | 0 | 0 | 2 | 0
16 | Agustina Sofia Giannasio (ARG); Aitthiwat Soithong (THA) | 2 | 2 | 0 | 2
9 | Stefany Jerez (DOM); Mateus de Carvalho Almeida (BRA) | 0 | 1 | 2 | 0
24 | Selin Satır (TUR); Akash Akash (IND) | 2 | 1 | 0 | 2
25 | Son Ye-ryeong (KOR); Dan Thompson (GBR) | 0 | 2 | 0 | 0
8 | Laura van der Winkel (NED); Stanislav Cheremiskin (RUS) | 2 | 0 | 2 | 2

2nd round
1 | Nada Amr Said Mohamed Azzam (EGY); Matthias Potrafke (GER) | 0 | 0 | 2 | 2 | 0
16 | Agustina Sofia Giannasio (ARG); Aitthiwat Soithong (THA) | 2 | 2 | 0 | 0 | 1
24 | Selin Satır (TUR); Akash Akash (IND) | 2 | 2 | 0 | 2
8 | Laura van der Winkel (NED); Stanislav Cheremiskin (RUS) | 0 | 0 | 2 | 0

Quarter finals
16 | Agustina Sofia Giannasio (ARG); Aitthiwat Soithong (THA) | 2 | 2 | 2
24 | Selin Satır (TUR); Akash Akash (IND) | 0 | 0 | 0

===== Section 2 =====
1st round
5 | Clea Reisenweber (GER); Federico Fabrizzi (ITA) | 0 | 2 | 0 | 0
28 | Rebecca Jones (NZL); Tang Chih-chun (TPE) | 2 | 0 | 2 | 2
21 | Sogand Rahmani (IRI); David Cadena (COL) | 0 | 0 | 0
12 | Hnin Pyae Sone (MYA); Samet Ak (TUR) | 2 | 2 | 2
13 | Nicole Marie Tagle (PHI); Hendrik Õun (EST) | 0 | 2 | 2 | 0 | 1
20 | Isabella Bassi (CHI); Ravien Dalpatadu (SRI) | 2 | 0 | 0 | 2 | 0
29 | Himani Himani (IND); Wian Roux (RSA) | 0 | 1 | 0
4 | Alyssia Tromans-Ansell (GBR); Reza Shabani (IRI) | 2 | 1 | 2

2nd round
28 | Rebecca Jones (NZL); Tang Chih-chun (TPE) | 2 | 1 | 2
12 | Hnin Pyae Sone (MYA); Samet Ak (TUR) | 0 | 1 | 0
13 | Nicole Marie Tagle (PHI); Hendrik Õun (EST) | 1 | 1 | 1 | 2
4 | Alyssia Tromans-Ansell (GBR); Reza Shabani (IRI) | 1 | 1 | 1 | 0

Quarter finals
28 | Rebecca Jones (NZL); Tang Chih-chun (TPE) | 1 | 2 | 2
13 | Nicole Marie Tagle (PHI); Hendrik Õun (EST) | 1 | 0 | 0

==== Bottom half ====
===== Section 3 =====
1st round
3 | Viktoria Kharitonova (RUS); Md Ibrahim Sheik Rezowan (BAN) | 0 | 2 | 2 | 0 | 1
30 | Ruka Uehara (JPN); Louis Gino Aurelien Juhel (MRI) | 2 | 0 | 0 | 2 | 0
19 | Èlia Canales (ESP); Tetsuya Aoshima (JPN) | 2 | 0 | 0 | 2 | 0
14 | Zhanna Naumova (UKR); Franck Eyeni (CIV) | 0 | 2 | 2 | 0 | 1
11 | Kyla Touraine-Helias (FRA); Jose Manuel Solera (ESP) | 2 | 2 | 2
22 | Chang Rong-jia (TPE); Benjamen Lee (CAN) | 0 | 0 | 0
27 | Jil Walter (SAM); Feng Hao (CHN) | 2 | 0 | 0 | 0
6 | Ana Luiza Sliachticas Caetano (BRA); Senna Roos (BEL) | 0 | 2 | 2 | 2

2nd round
3 | Viktoria Kharitonova (RUS); Md Ibrahim Sheik Rezowan (BAN) | 0 | 2 | 2 | 0 | 1
14 | Zhanna Naumova (UKR); Franck Eyeni (CIV) | 2 | 0 | 0 | 2 | 0
11 | Kyla Touraine-Helias (FRA); Jose Manuel Solera (ESP) | 0 | 2 | 2 | 2
6 | Ana Luiza Sliachticas Caetano (BRA); Senna Roos (BEL) | 2 | 0 | 0 | 0

Quarter finals
3 | Viktoria Kharitonova (RUS); Md Ibrahim Sheik Rezowan (BAN) | 1 | 0 | 0
11 | Kyla Touraine-Helias (FRA); Jose Manuel Solera (ESP) | 1 | 2 | 2

===== Section 4 =====
1st round
7 | Catalina GNoriega (USA); Hazael Jesus Rodríguez Valero (CUB) | 0 | 0 | 0
26 | Kang Jin-hwa (PRK); Carlos Daniel Vaca Cordero (MEX) | 2 | 2 | 2
23 | Liliya Trydvornava (BLR); Artem Ovchynnikov (UKR) | 0 | 2 | 2 | 1
10 | Milena Gațco (MDA); Jason Hurnall (AUS) | 2 | 0 | 0 | 1
15 | Alexandra Voropayeva (KAZ); Alejandro Benítez (PAR) | 0 | 0 | 0
18 | Quinn Reddig (NAM); Trenton Cowles (USA) | 2 | 2 | 2
31 | Mst Radia Akther Shapla (BAN); Song In-jun (KOR) | 2 | 0 | 0 | 0
2 | Valentina Vázquez Cadena (MEX); Alikhan Mustafin (KAZ) | 0 | 2 | 2 | 2

2nd round
26 | Kang Jin-hwa (PRK); Carlos Daniel Vaca Cordero (MEX) | 2 | 2 | 1
23 | Liliya Trydvornava (BLR); Artem Ovchynnikov (UKR) | 0 | 0 | 1
18 | Quinn Reddig (NAM); Trenton Cowles (USA) | 2 | 2 | 0 | 2
2 | Valentina Vázquez Cadena (MEX); Alikhan Mustafin (KAZ) | 0 | 0 | 2 | 0

Quarter finals
26 | Kang Jin-hwa (PRK); Carlos Daniel Vaca Cordero (MEX) | 0 | 0 | 2 | 0
18 | Quinn Reddig (NAM); Trenton Cowles (USA) | 2 | 2 | 0 | 2
