= Diving at the 2018 Summer Youth Olympics – Girls' 10m platform =

Girls' 10m platform at the III Summer Youth Olympic Games
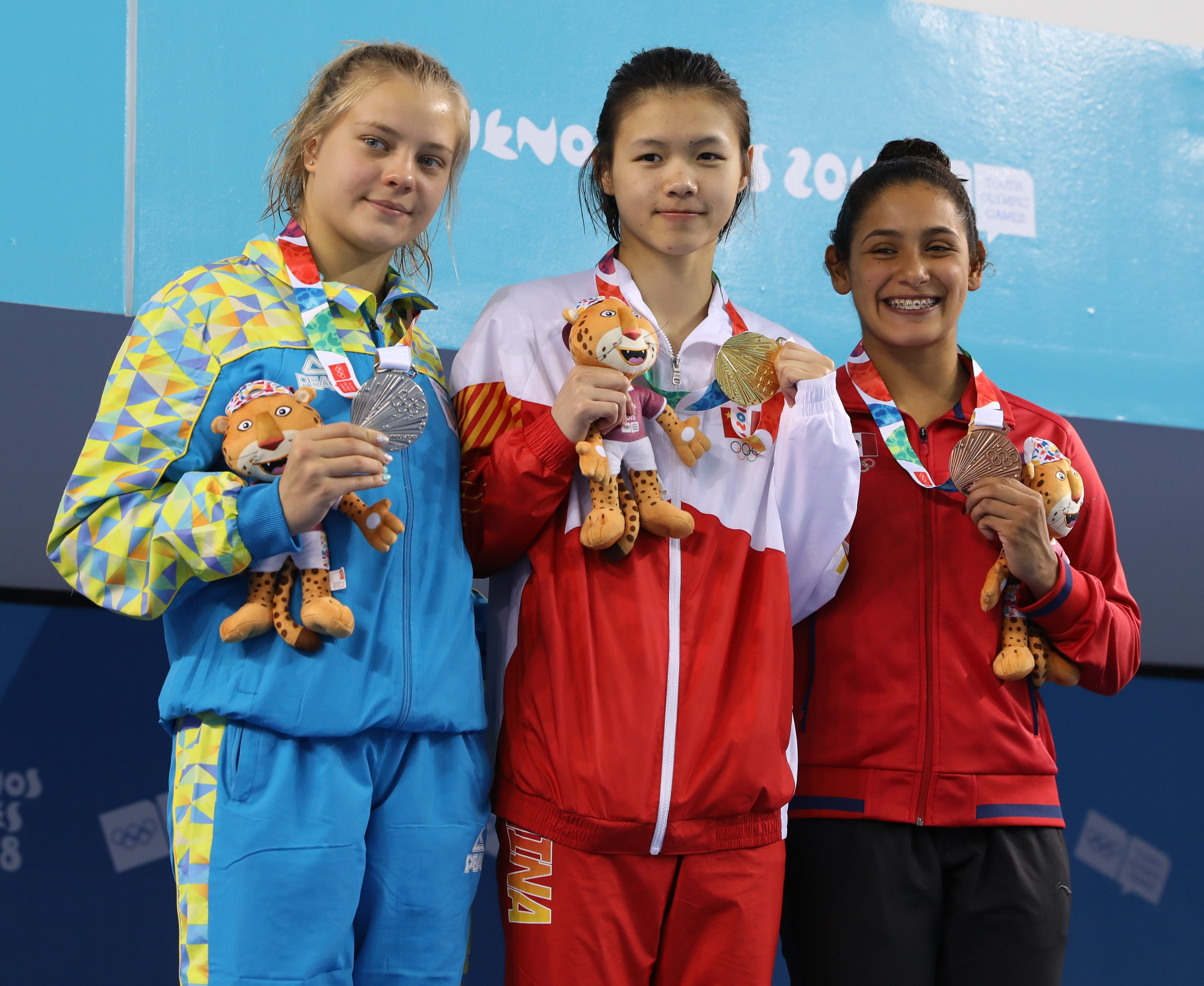
- The medailists
- Venue: Natatorium
- Dates: 13 October
- Competitors: 11 from 11 nations

Medalists
1st place, gold medalist(s)		Lin Shan	China
2nd place, silver medalist(s)		Sofiya Lyskun	Ukraine
3rd place, bronze medalist(s)		Gabriela Agundes	Mexico

These are the results for the girls' 10m platform event at the 2018 Summer Youth Olympics.

== Results ==
Rank	Diver	Nation	Preliminary		Final	
Rank	Diver	Nation	Points	Rank	Points	Rank
1st place, gold medalist(s)	Lin Shan	China	485.50	1	466.50	1
2nd place, silver medalist(s)	Sofiya Lyskun	Ukraine	420.80	3	406.10	2
3rd place, bronze medalist(s)	Gabriela Agundes	Mexico	435.05	2	405.55	3
4	Kimberly Bong	Malaysia	371.50	4	385.40	4
5	Tanya Watson	Ireland	357.00	6	362.45	5
6	Elena Wassen	Germany	365.60	5	350.70	6
7	Mélodie Leclerc	Canada	346.45	7	347.35	7
8	Ronja Rundgren	Finland	336.85	8	329.80	8
9	Helle Tuxen	Norway	310.50	9	300.75	9
10	Yelizaveta Borova	Kazakhstan	260.45	11	271.45	10
11	Anna dos Santos	Brazil	272.00	10	250.20	11

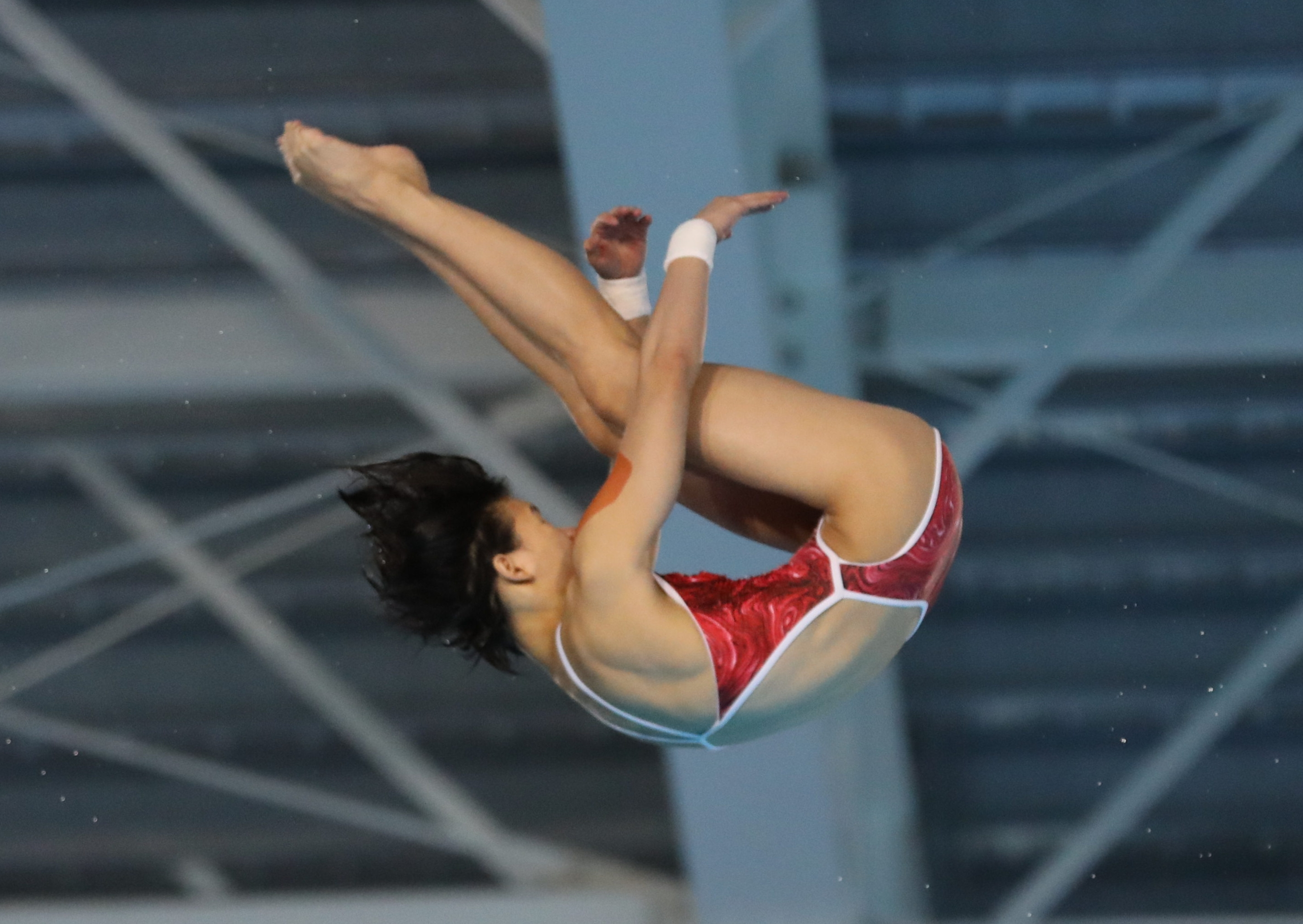
Lin Shan

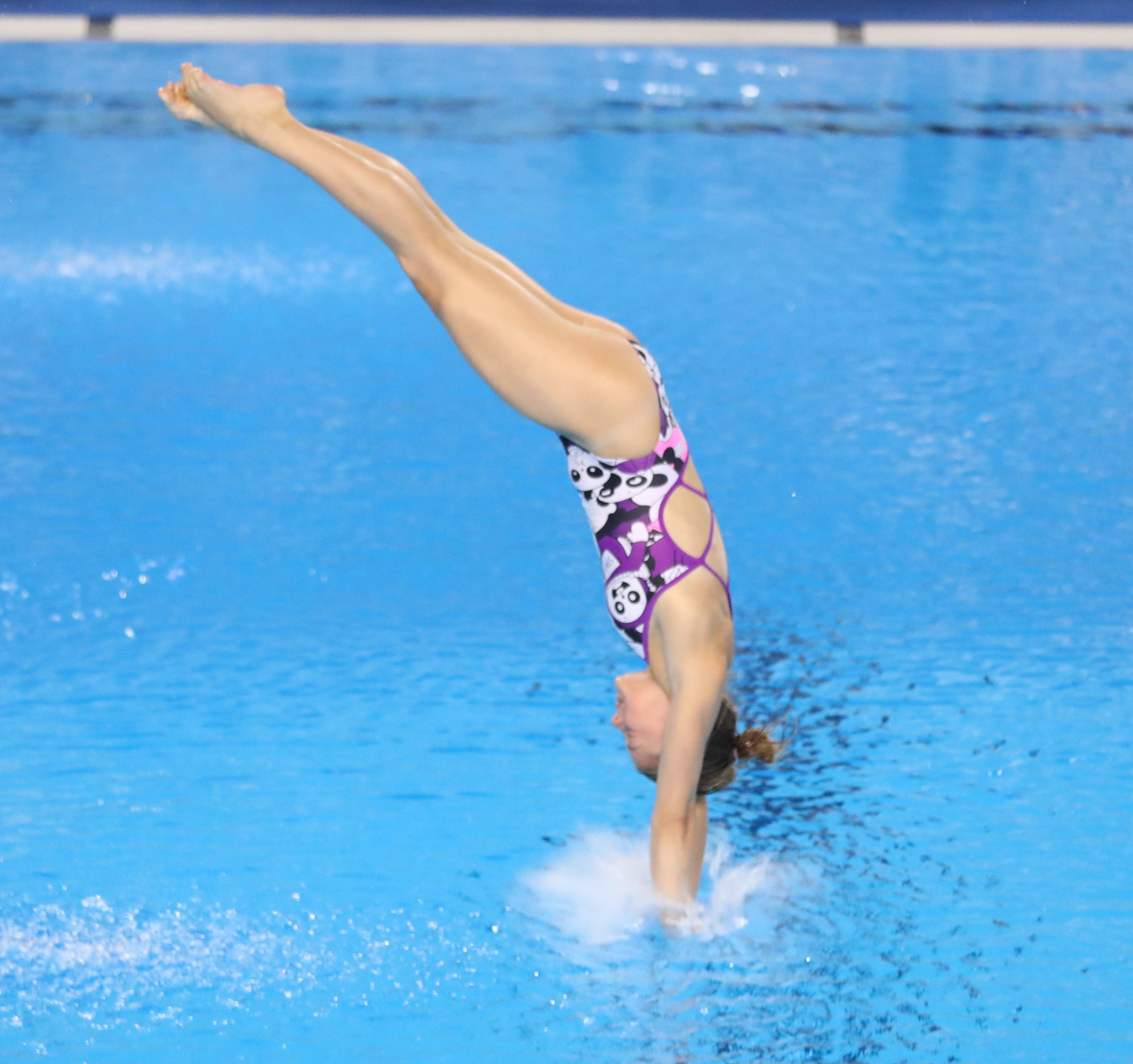
Sofiya Lyskun

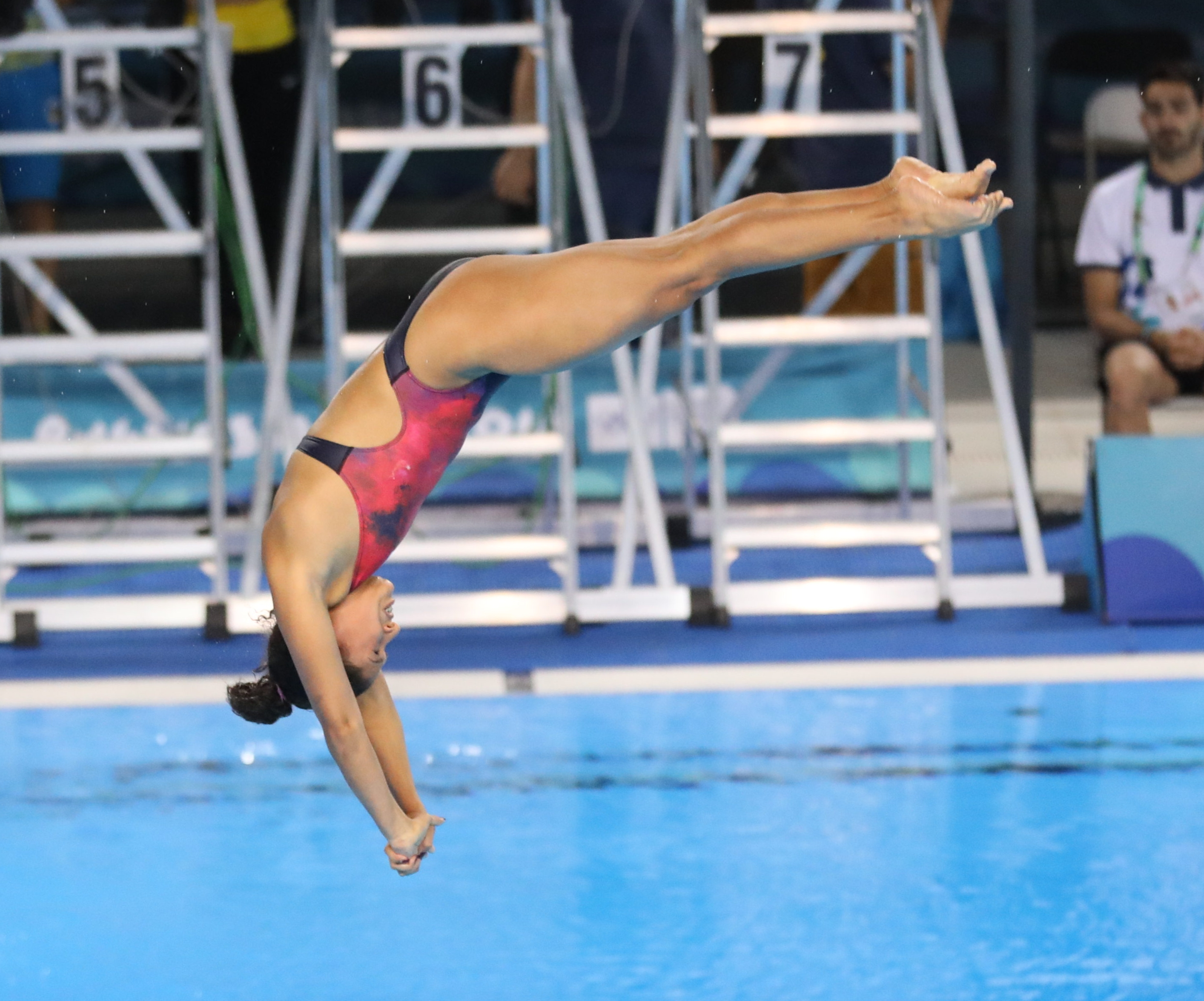
Gabriela Agundes

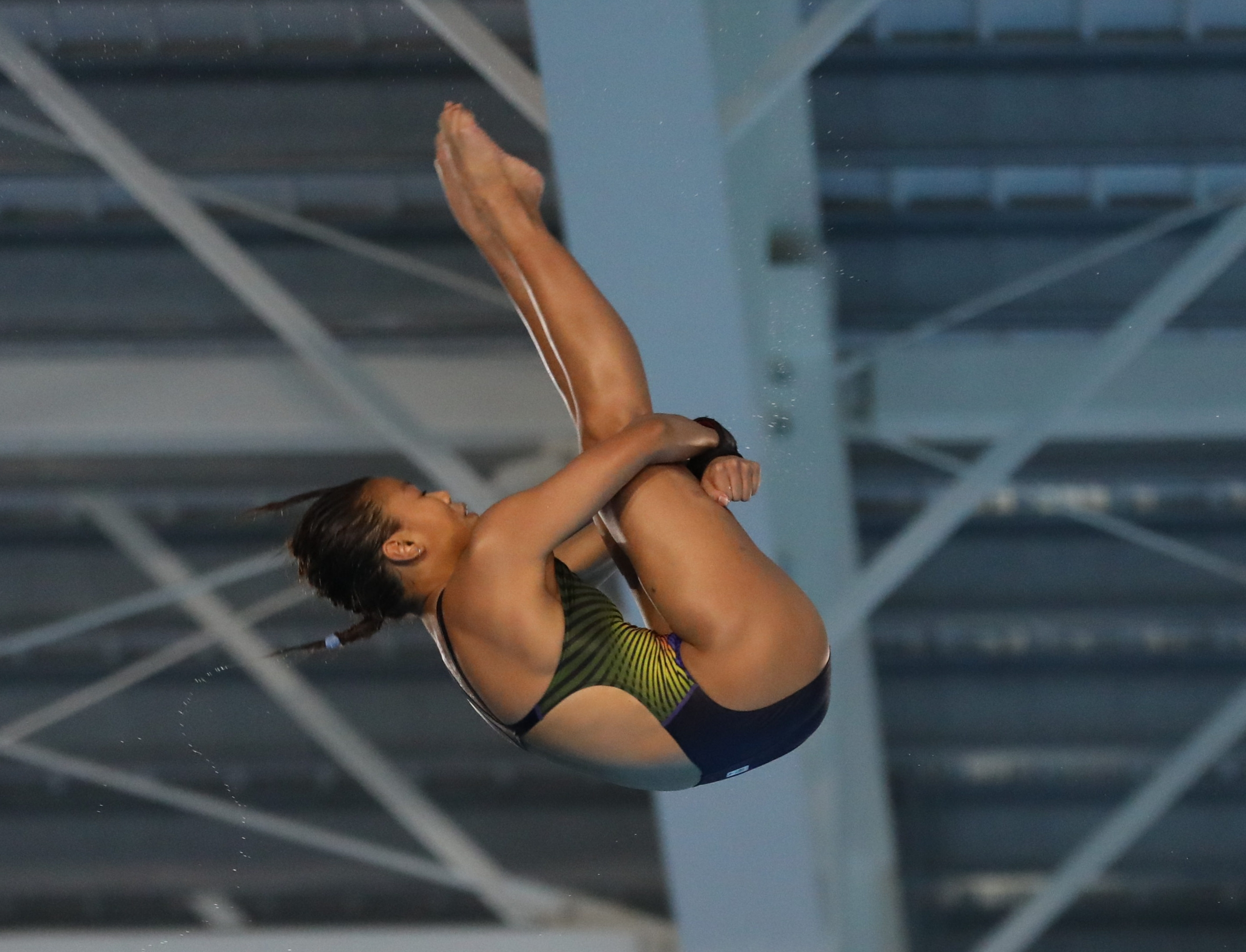
Kimberly Bong

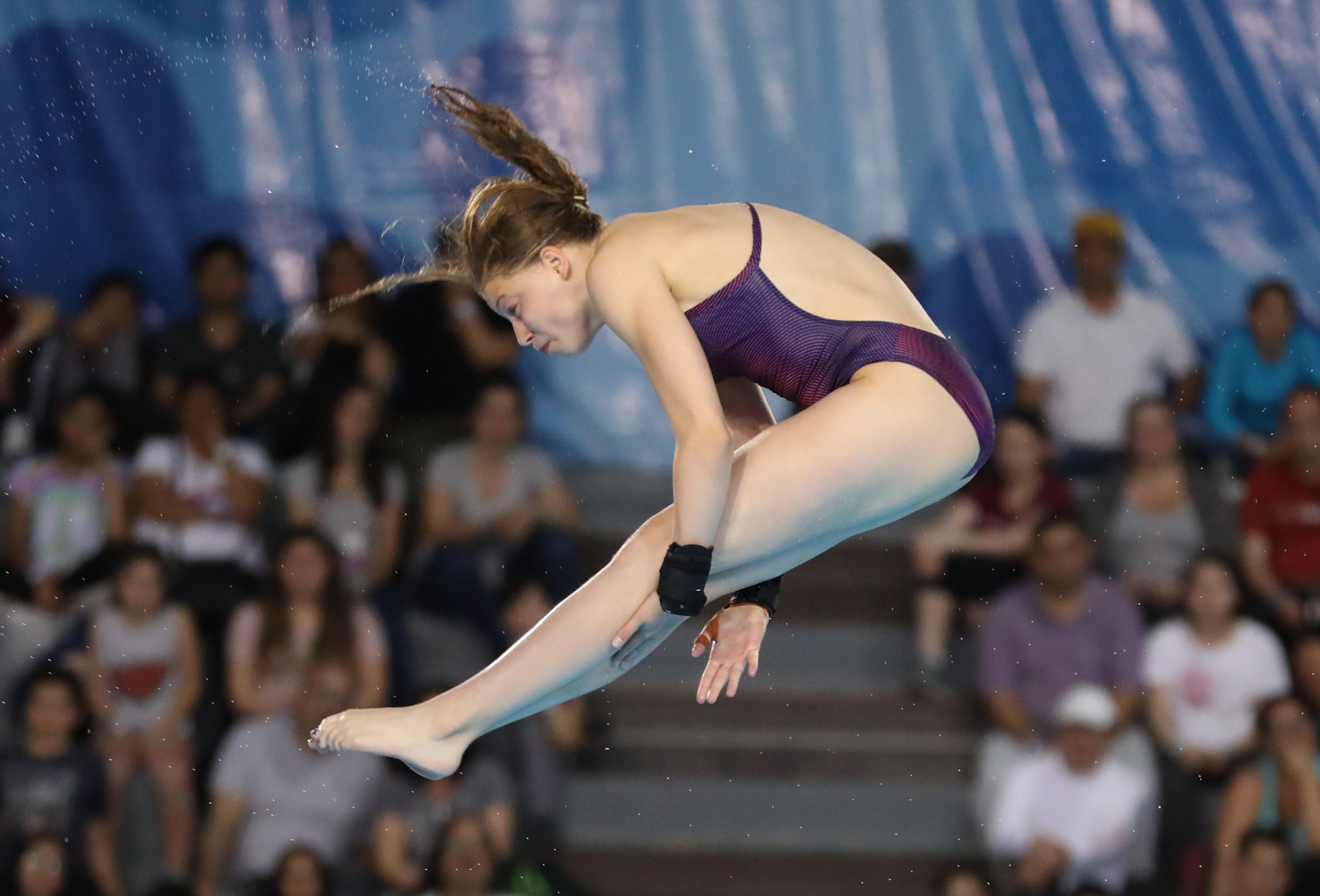
Tanya Watson

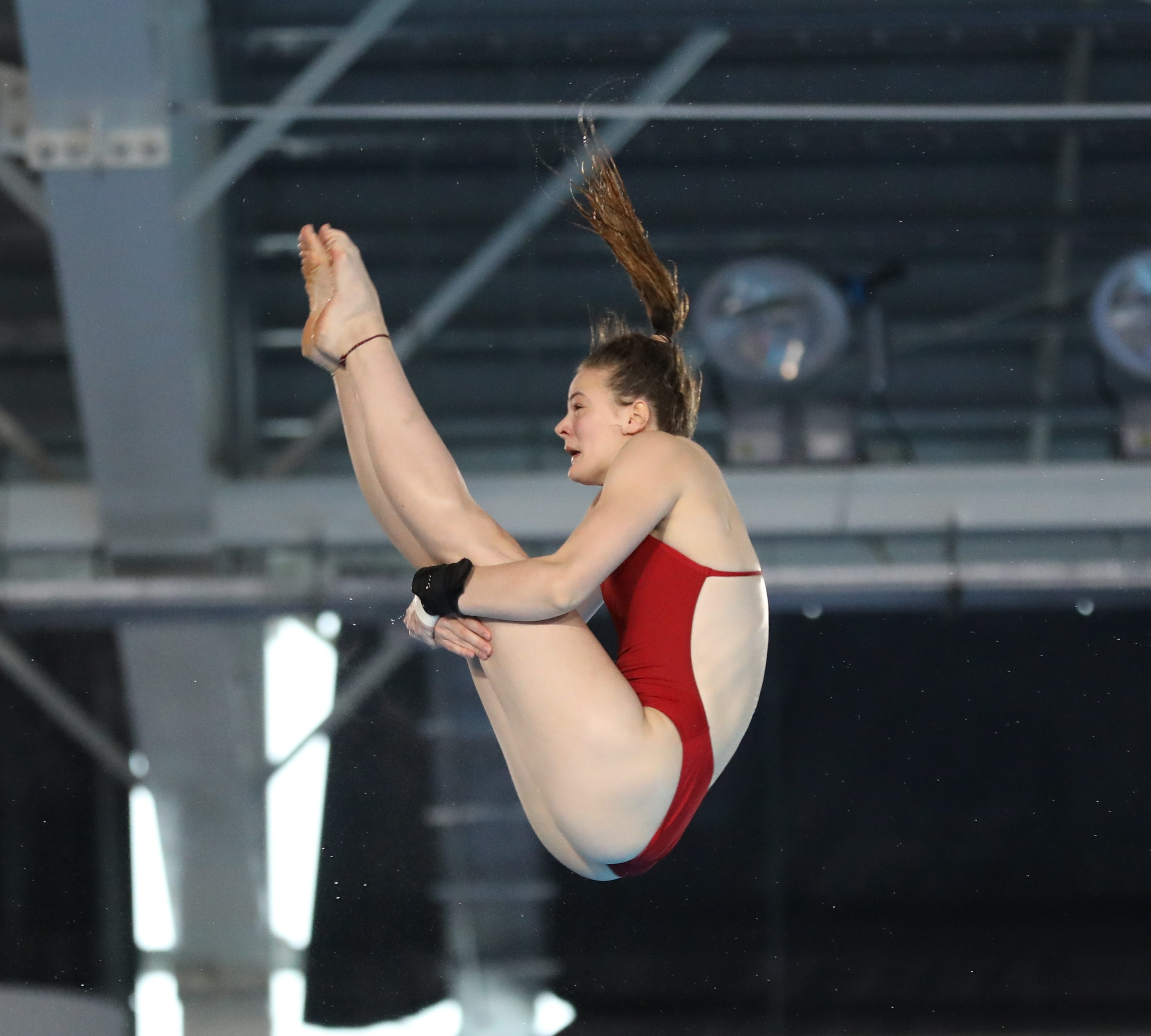
Elena Wassen

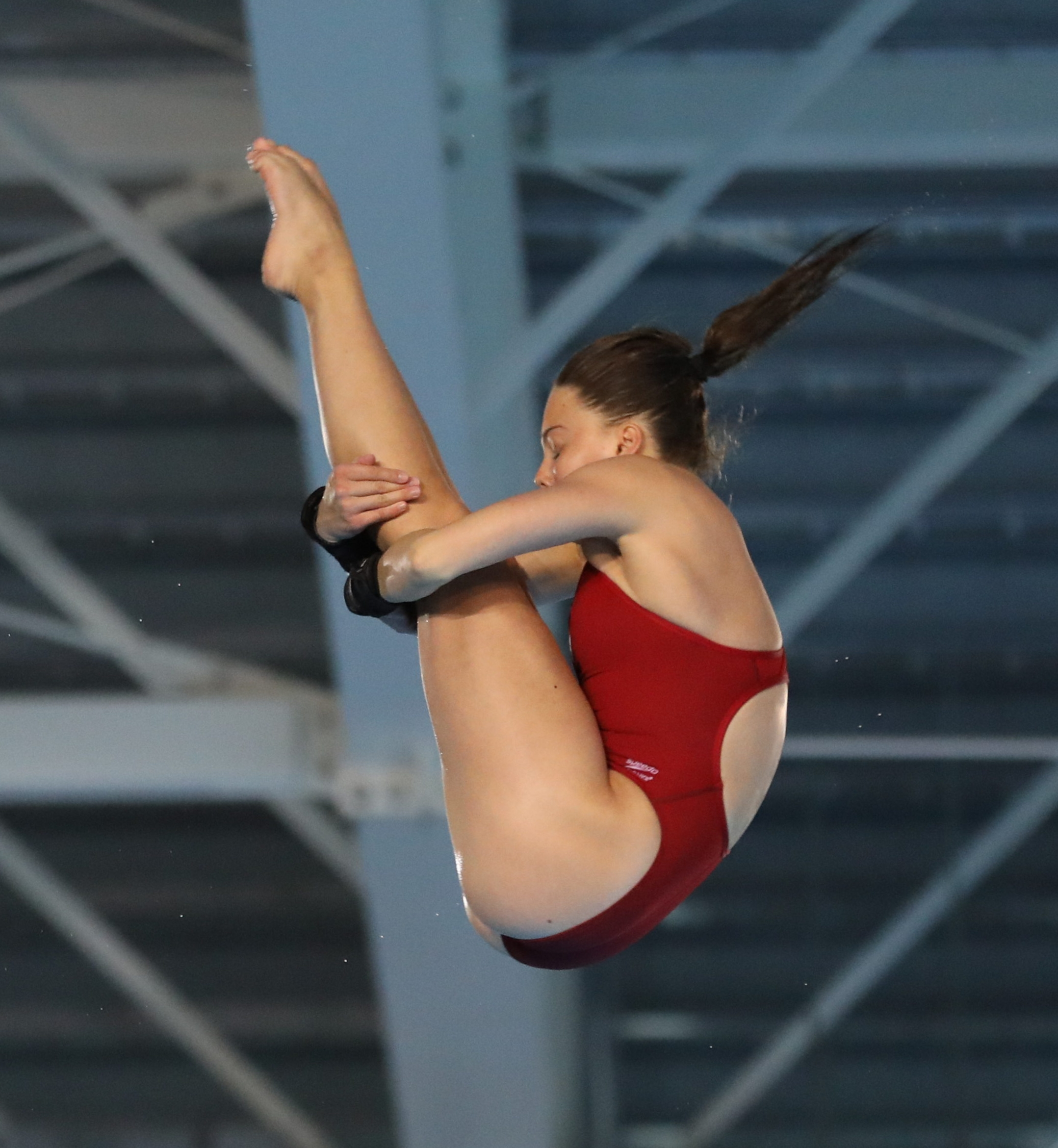
Mélodie Leclerc

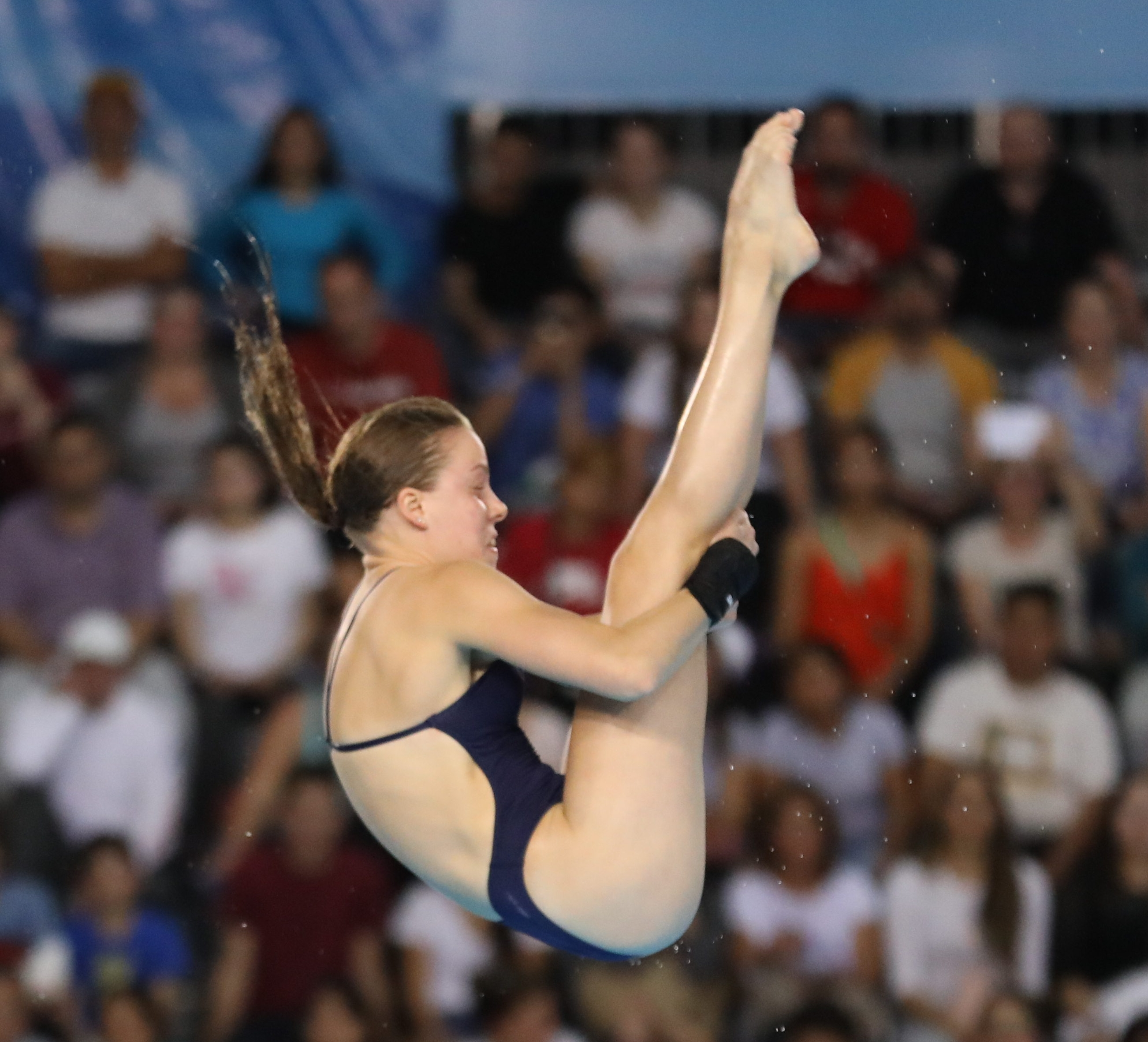
Ronja Rundgren

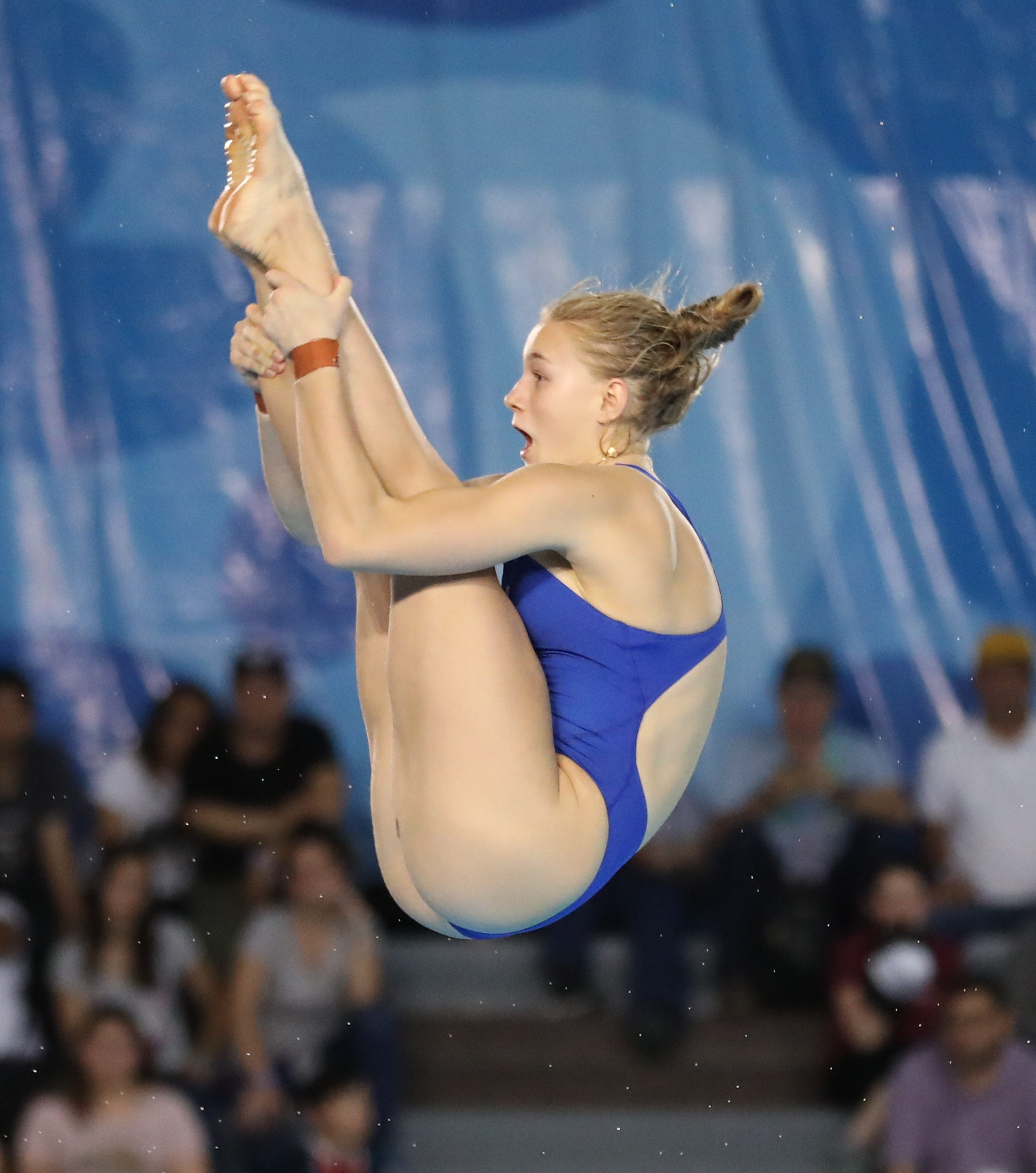
Helle Tuxen

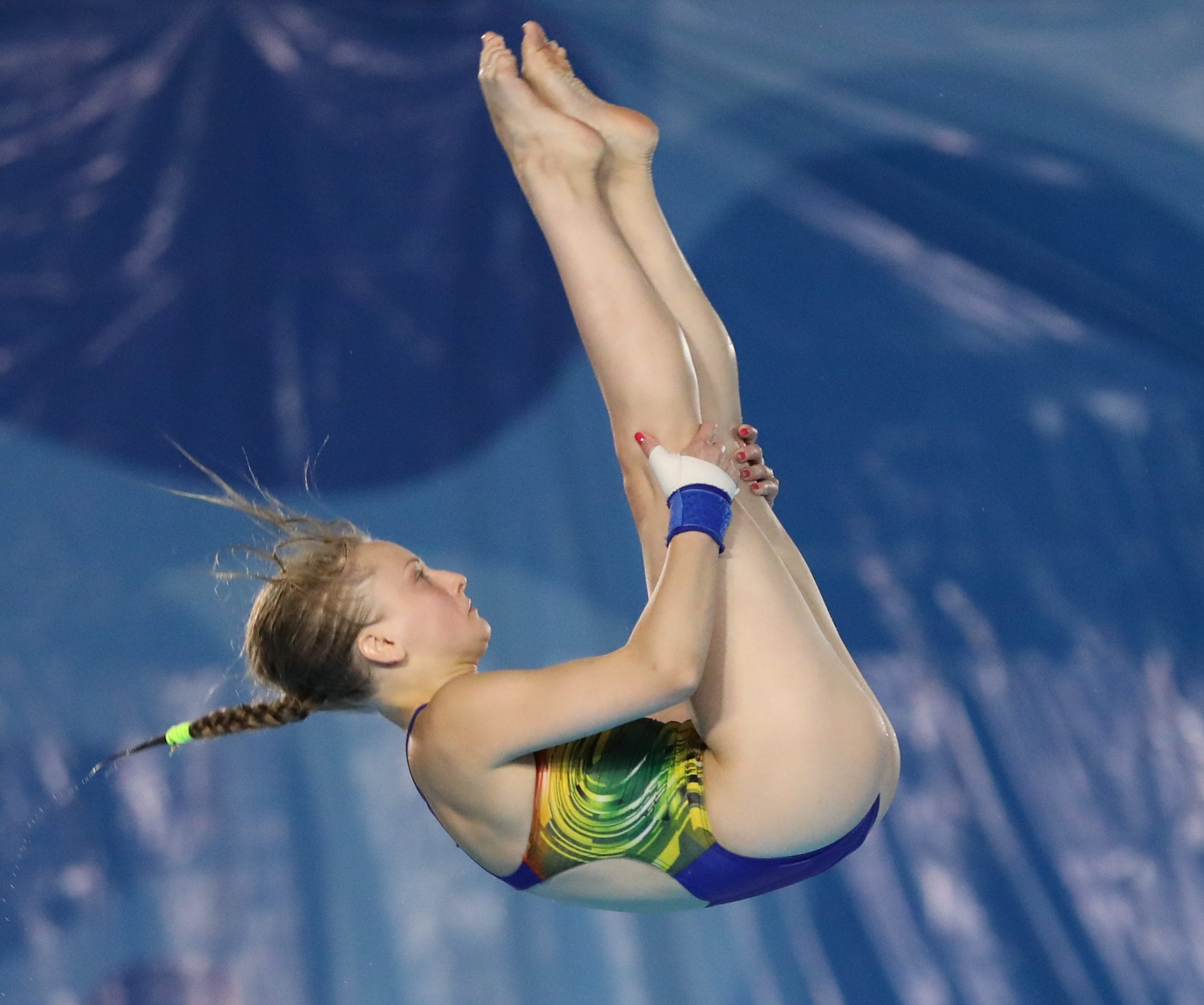
Yelizaveta Borova

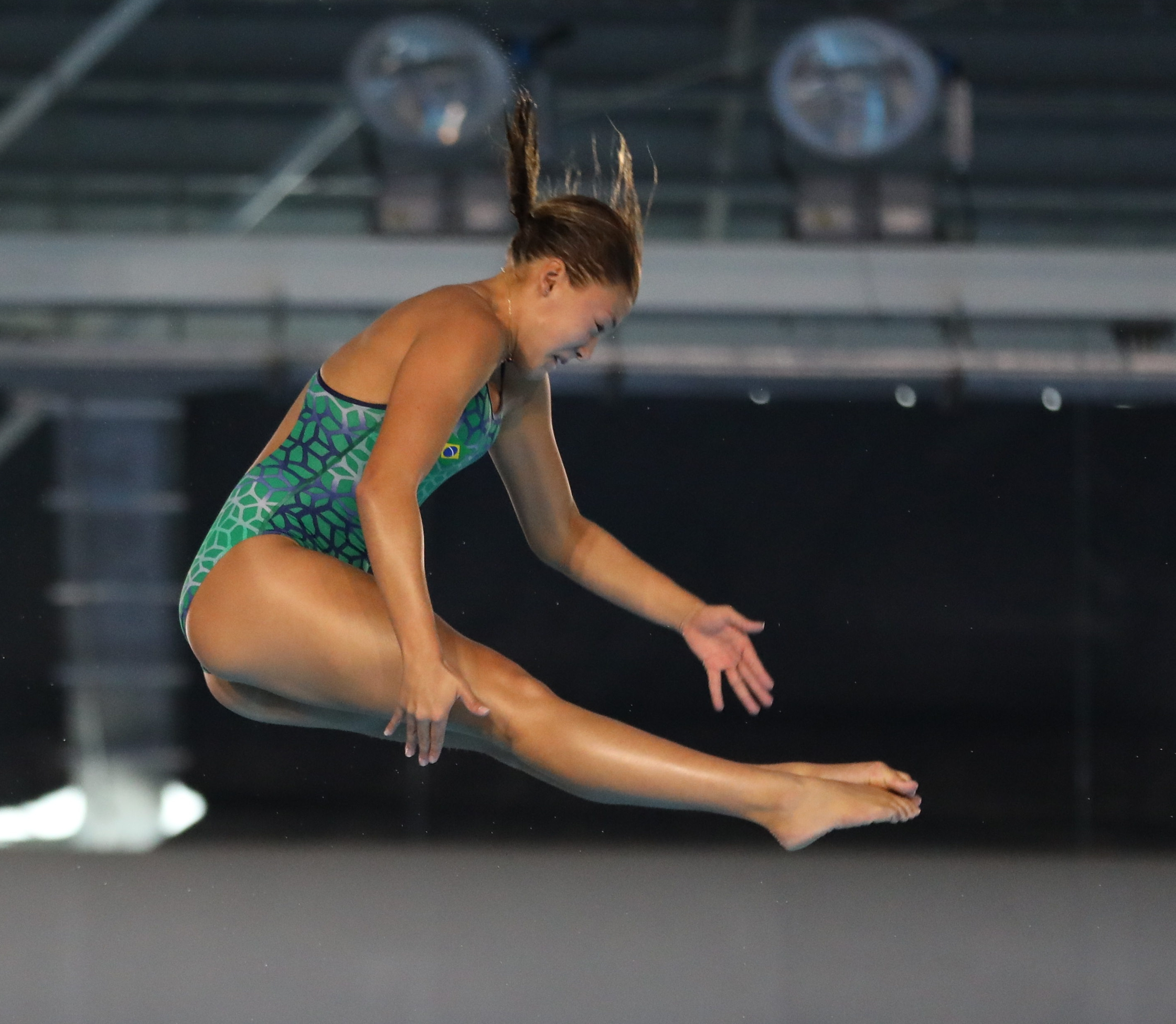
Anna dos Santos

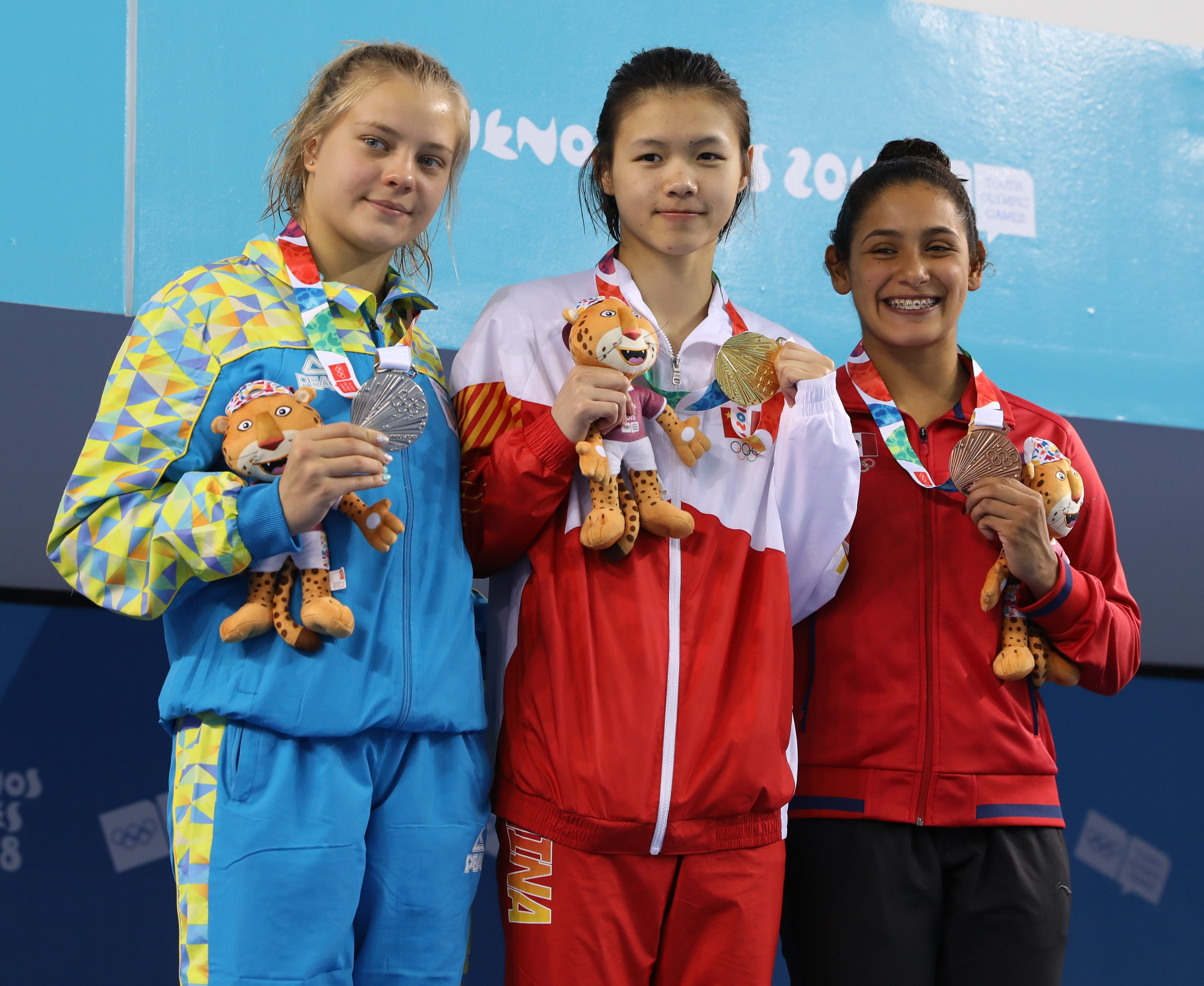
Victory ceremony
