= Bangladesh at the 2018 Summer Youth Olympics =

- IOC code: BAN
- NOC: Bangladesh Olympic Association
- Website: http://www.nocban.org/

in Buenos Aires, Argentina 6 – 18 October 2018
- Competitors: 13 in 3 sports
- Medals: Gold 0 Silver 0 Bronze 0 Total 0

Summer Youth Olympics appearances
- 2010; 2014; 2018

Bangladesh participated at the 2018 Summer Youth Olympics in Buenos Aires, Argentina from 6 October to 18 October 2018.

== Competitors ==
Sport	Boys	Girls	Total
Archery	1	1	2
Field hockey	9	0	9
Shooting	1	1	2
Total	11	2	13

== Archery ==
Individual

Athlete	Event	Ranking round		Round of 32	Round of 16	Quarterfinals	Semifinals	Final / BM	Rank
Athlete	Event	Score	Seed	Opposition Score	Opposition Score	Opposition Score	Opposition Score	Opposition Score	Rank
Md Ibrahim Sheik Rezowan	Boys' Individual	647	25	Roos (BEL); L 5–6	did not advance				17
Mst Radia Akther Shapla	Girls' Individual	580	32	Zhang (CHN); L 0–6	did not advance				17

Team

Athletes	Event	Ranking round		Round of 32	Round of 16	Quarterfinals	Semifinals	Final / BM	Rank
Athletes	Event	Score	Seed	Opposition Score	Opposition Score	Opposition Score	Opposition Score	Opposition Score	Rank
Md Ibrahim Sheik Rezowan (BAN); Viktoria Kharitonova (RUS)	Mixed team	1305	3	Uehara (JPN); Juhel (MRI); W 5–4	Naumova (UKR); Eyeni (CIV); W 5–4	Touraine-Helias (FRA); Solera (ESP); L 1–5	did not advance		7
Mst Radia Akther Shapla (BAN); Song In-jun (KOR)	Mixed team	1271	31	Vázquez Cadena (MEX); Mustafin (KAZ); L 2–6	did not advance				17

== Field hockey 5-a side ==
Bangladesh qualified a boys team of 9 athletes at the Asian Championships.

=== Preliminary round ===
Pos	Team	Pld	W	D	L	GF	GA	GD	Pts	Qualification
1	Australia	5	5	0	0	23	9	+14	15	Quarterfinals
2	India	5	4	0	1	34	8	+26	12	Quarterfinals
3	Austria	5	3	0	2	11	16	−5	9	Quarterfinals
4	Bangladesh	5	2	0	3	12	22	−10	6	Quarterfinals
5	Canada	5	1	0	4	13	22	−9	3	9th place game
6	Kenya	5	0	0	5	10	26	−16	0	11th place game

Source: FIH
Rules for classification: 1) Points; 2) Goal difference; 3) Goals scored; 4) Head-to-head result.

7 October 2018
11:45

India	10–0	Bangladesh
Anand 4'; Rajbhar 4', 9'; Sanjay 6'; Prasad 9', 18'; Chirmako 11', 17'; M. Singh 12'; Moirangthem 20'	Report

Umpires:
Hideki Kinoshita (JPN)
Hristiyan Vasilev (BUL)

8 October 2018
14:00

Australia	4–3	Bangladesh
B. Marais 1'; C. Marais 6'; White 10'; Murray 11'	Report	Sobuj 4'; Alam 11'; Sarowar 18'

Umpires:
Jonathan Altamirano (MEX)
Darren Hubach (RSA)

9 October 2018
10:15

Austria	3–0	Bangladesh
Matousek 9', 14'; Trnka 18'	Report

Umpires:
Nick Saunders (NZL)
Hristiyan Vasilev (BUL)

10 October 2018
16:15

Bangladesh	5–2	Canada
Alam 8', 16'; H. Mohammad 12'; Sobuj 13'; Hossain 17'	Report	Butt 3'; G. Singh 18'

Umpires:
Hideki Kinoshita (JPN)
Darren Hubach (RSA)

11 October 2018
12:30

Bangladesh	4–3	Kenya
M. Mohammad 7'; Sarowar 8'; H. Mohammad 15'; Hossain 18'	Report	Ogenche 4', 6'; Ouma 11'

Umpires:
Hideki Kinoshita (JPN)
Darren Hubach (RSA)

Quarterfinals

12 October 2018
12:00

Argentina	5–0	Bangladesh
Zarate 1', 8', 12'; Marcucci 17'; Ibarra 18'	Report

Umpires:
Peter Kabaso (KEN)
Nick Saunders (NZL)

=== 5–8th place semifinals ===
13 October 2018
09:00

Bangladesh	4–5	Poland
Sobuj 13', 15', 17'; Mohammad 20'	Report	Nitka 4'; Nowkowski 6'; Jarzyński 9', 14', 18'

Umpires:
Napoleon Chanamthabam (IND)
James Unkles (AUS)

=== Seventh place game ===
14 October 2018
08:30

Bangladesh	2–2	Austria
Sarowar 1'; Sobuj 2'	Report	Albrecht 7'; Drusany 8'
Penalties
Sarowar (penalty shoot-out missed); Hossain (penalty shoot-out missed)	0–2	(penalty shoot-out scored) Nyckowiak; (penalty shoot-out missed) Trnka; (penalty shoot-out scored) Matousek

Umpires:
Darren Hubach (RSA)
James Unkles (AUS)

== Shooting ==
Bangladesh qualified one sport shooter based on its performance at the 2017 Asian Championships. They also received a quota through the tripartite commission.

Athlete	Event	Qualification		Final	
Athlete	Event	Points	Rank	Points	Rank
Arnab Sharar	Boys' 10 metre air rifle	618.1	10	did not advance	
Amira Hamid	Girls' 10 metre air rifle	609.0	17	did not advance	

Team

Athletes	Event	Qualification		Round of 16	Quarterfinals	Semifinals	Final / BM	Rank
Athletes	Event	Points	Rank	Opposition Result	Opposition Result	Opposition Result	Opposition Result	Rank
Zhang Changhong (CHN); Amira Hamid (BAN)	Mixed 10 metre air rifle	815.3	16Q	Erdenechuluun (MGL); Pekler (HUN); L 7–10	did not advance			16
Chen Yun-Yun (TPE); Arnab Sharar (BAN)	Mixed 10 metre air rifle	815.5	15Q	Pardabaeva (UZB); Shamakov (RUS); W 10–7	Martínez (MEX); Wadlegger (AUT); L 8–10	did not advance		8
