= South Korea at the 2018 Summer Youth Olympics =

- IOC code: KOR
- NOC: Korean Sport & Olympic Committee
- Website: http://www.sports.or.kr/

in Buenos Aires, Argentina 6 – 18 October 2018
- Competitors: 28 in 14 sports
- Flag bearer: Song Gun Kim (opening)
- Medals Ranked 44th: Gold 1 Silver 4 Bronze 7 Total 12

Summer Youth Olympics appearances (overview)
- 2010; 2014; 2018; 2026

South Korea participated at the 2018 Summer Youth Olympics in Buenos Aires, Argentina from 6 October to 18 October 2018.

== Medalists ==
Medal	Name	Sport	Event	Date
Gold	Cho Won-hee	Taekwondo	Boys' 63 kg	9 Oct
Silver	Hyun Jun	Fencing	Boys' sabre	7 Oct
Silver	Kang Mi-reu	Taekwondo	Girls' 44 kg	7 Oct
Silver	Kim Kang-min	Taekwondo	Boys' 55 kg	8 Oct
Silver	Sung Yun-ho	Shooting	Boys' 10 meter air pistol	10 Oct
Bronze	Im Seong-bin	Taekwondo	Boys' 48 kg	7 Oct
Bronze	Kim Ju-hee	Judo	Girls' 63 kg	8 Oct
Bronze	Lee Ye-ji	Taekwondo	Girls' 49 kg	8 Oct
Bronze	Lee Ju-eun	Fencing	Girls' sabre	9 Oct
Bronze	Kim Ye-ri	Dancesport	B-Girls	11 Oct
Bronze	Wang Hee-song	Swimming	Girls' 200 m breaststroke	12 Oct
Bronze	Son Ye-ryeong	Archery	Girls' individual	16 Oct

== Competitors ==
Sport	Boys	Girls	Total
Archery	1	1	2
Athletics	1	0	1
Dancesport	0	1	1
Fencing	1	2	3
Golf	1	0	1
Gymnastics	1	2	3
Judo	0	1	1
Roller speed skating	1	0	1
Shooting	1	0	1
Sport climbing	2	0	2
Swimming	2	2	4
Table tennis	1	1	2
Taekwondo	3	2	5
Triathlon	0	1	1
Total	15	13	28

== Archery ==
South Korea qualified two archers based on its performance at the 2017 World Archery Youth Championships.

Individual

Athlete	Event	Ranking round		Round of 32	Round of 16	Quarterfinals	Semifinals	Final / BM	Rank
Athlete	Event	Score	Seed	Opposition Score	Opposition Score	Opposition Score	Opposition Score	Opposition Score	Rank
Song In-jun	Boys' Individual	691	1	Tura (SMR); W 6–2	Benítez (PAR); W 7–1	Roos (BEL); L 1–7	did not advance		7
Son Ye-ryeong	Girls' Individual	663	4	Kang (PRK); W 6–0	Naumova (UKR); W 6–0	Chang (TPE); W 6–0	Zhang (CHN); L 4–6	Vázquez Cadena (MEX); W 7–3	3rd place, bronze medalist(s)

Team

Athletes	Event	Ranking round		Round of 32	Round of 16	Quarterfinals	Semifinals	Final / BM	Rank
Athletes	Event	Score	Seed	Opposition Score	Opposition Score	Opposition Score	Opposition Score	Opposition Score	Rank
Song In-jun (KOR); Mst Radia Akther Shapla (BAN)	Mixed Team	1271	31	Vázquez Cadena (MEX); Mustafin (KAZ); L 2–6	did not advance				17
Son Ye-ryeong (KOR); Dan Thompson (GBR)	Mixed Team	1293	25	van der Winkel (NED); Cheremiskin (RUS); L 2–6	did not advance				17

== Dancesport ==
South Korea qualified one dancer based on its performance at the 2018 World Youth Breaking Championship.

- B-Girls - Yell

== Fencing ==
South Korea qualified four athletes based on its performance at the 2018 Cadet World Championship, but only 3 participated.

Athlete	Event	Pool Round	Seed	Round of 16	Quarterfinals	Semifinals	Final / BM	Rank
Athlete	Event	Opposition Score	Seed	Opposition Score	Opposition Score	Opposition Score	Opposition Score	Rank
Hyun Jun	Boys' Sabre	Pool 2 Vidovszky (USA); W 5-4; El Araby (EGY); W 5-1; Coly (SEN); W 5-0; Mahbas (IRQ); W 5-0; Rabb (HUN); L 2-5; Shaker (IRI); W 5-2; Heathcock (GER); W 5-4	2	Coly (SEN); W DNF	Kato (JPN); W 15-12	Vidovszky (USA); W 15-14	Rabb (HUN); L 13-15	2nd place, silver medalist(s)

- ~~Boys' Foil - Kwon Jungsung~~
- Girls' Épée - Lim Taehee
- Girls' Sabre - Lee Jueun

== Gymnastics ==
=== Artistic ===
South Korea qualified two gymnasts based on its performance at the 2018 Asian Junior Championship.

- Boys' artistic individual all-around - 1 quota
- Girls' artistic individual all-around - 1 quota

=== Rhythmic ===
South Korea qualified one gymnast based on its performance at the 2018 Asian Junior Championship.

- Girls' rhythmic individual all-around - 1 quota

== Golf ==
Individual

Athlete	Event	Round 1		Round 2			Round 3			Total		
Athlete	Event	Score	Rank	Score	Total	Rank	Score	Total	Rank	Score	Par	Rank
Park Sangha	Boys' Individual	73 (+3)	12	77 (+7)	140	23	73 (+3)	223	12	223	+13	16

Team

Athletes	Event	Round 1 (Fourball)		Round 2 (Foursome)		Round 3 (Individual Stroke)				Total		
Athletes	Event	Score	Rank	Score	Rank	Girl	Boy	Total	Rank	Score	Par	Rank
Ribka Vania (INA); Park Sangha (KOR)	Mixed team	66 (-4)	16	69 (-1)	2	75	73	148 (+8)	16	283	+3	8

== Judo ==
Athlete	Event	Round of 16	Quarterfinals	Semifinals	Repechage1	Repechage2	Repechage3	Final/BM match	
Athlete	Event	Opposition Result	Opposition Result	Opposition Result	Opposition Result	Opposition Result	Opposition Result	Opposition Result	Rank
Kim Ju-hee	Girls' −63 kg	Alessia Corrao (BEL); L 01-11	did not advance		Bye	Marin Visser (NED); W 01–00s2	Itzel Pecha (MEX); W 10–00	Nikol Pencue (COL); W 01–00s1	3rd place, bronze medalist(s)

Team

Team	Event	Round 1	Round 2	Semifinals	Final	Rank
Team	Event	Opposition Result	Opposition Result	Opposition Result	Opposition Result	Rank
Seoul; Mohammed Al-Mishri (LBA); Alex Barto (SVK); Sairy Colón (PUR); María Giménez (VEN); Yuri Israelyan (ARM); Kim Ju-hee (KOR); Omaria Ramírez (DOM); Wu Xiao-zhang (TPE)	Mixed Team	Los Angeles; L 3–5	did not advance			9

== Modern pentathlon ==
South Korea qualified two pentathletes based on its performance at the Asian/Oceanian Youth Olympic Games Qualifier. South Korea qualified a second male based on its performance at the 2018 Youth A World Championship. The nation must choose between the two boys.

- Boys' Individual - Shin Hyoseop or Moon Juseong
- Girls' Individual - Yoon Yangji

Eventually no South Korean modern pentathletes competed.

== Roller speed skating ==
South Korea qualified two roller skaters based on its performance at the 2018 Roller Speed Skating World Championship.

- Boys' combined speed event - Cheon Jongji
- Girls' combined speed event - Lee Yerim

== Shooting ==
South Korea qualified one sport shooter based on its performance at the 2017 Asian Championships.

- Boys' 10m Air Pistol - 1 quota

Individual

Athlete	Event	Qualification		Final	
Athlete	Event	Points	Rank	Points	Rank
Sung Yun-ho	Boys' 10 m air pistol	569-15	6	236.7	2nd place, silver medalist(s)

Mixed

Athlete	Event	Qualification		Round of 16	Quarterfinal	Semifinal	Final	
Athlete	Event	Points	Rank	Opposition Score	Opposition Score	Opposition Score	Opposition Score	Rank
Doua Chalghoum (TUN); Sung Yun-ho (KOR)	Mixed 10 metre air pistol	720-7	20	did not advance				

== Sport climbing ==
South Korea qualified one sport climber based on its performance at the 2017 World Youth Sport Climbing Championships.

- Boys' combined - 1 quota (Seongmin Eog)

== Table tennis ==
South Korea qualified one table tennis player based on its performance at the Asian Continental Qualifier. South Korea also qualified a female table tennis player based on its performance at the Road to Buenos Aires (Asia) series.

- Boys' singles - Cho Daeseong
- Girls' singles - Choi Haeeun

== Taekwondo ==
Boys

Athlete	Event	Round of 16	Quarterfinals	Semifinals	Final	
Athlete	Event	Opposition Result	Opposition Result	Opposition Result	Opposition Result	Rank
Im Seong-bin	48 kg	Bye	Zurab Kintsurashvili (GEO); W 30-11	Ulugbek Rashitov (UZB); L 10-21	did not advance	3rd place, bronze medalist(s)
Kim Kang-min	55 kg	Daniel Goichman (ISR); W 33-11	Georgios Ioannou (GRE); W 23-15	Zaid Abdul Kareem (JOR); W 31-16	Georgii Popov (RUS); L 26-33	2nd place, silver medalist(s)
Cho Won-hee	63 kg	Bye	Ramiro Ravachino (ARG); W 41-21	Javad Aghayev (AZE); W 15-13	Nareupong Thepsen (THA); W 21-16	1st place, gold medalist(s)

Girls

Athlete	Event	Round of 16	Quarterfinals	Semifinals	Final	
Athlete	Event	Opposition Result	Opposition Result	Opposition Result	Opposition Result	Rank
Kang Mi-reu	44 kg	Bye	Mahla Momenzadeh (IRI); W 15-14	Lena Stojković (CRO); W 16-13	Polina Shcherbakova (RUS); L 6-12	2nd place, silver medalist(s)
Lee Ye-ji	49 kg	Bye	Aaliyah Powell (GBR); W 21-14	Anastasija Zolotic (USA); L 11-21	did not advance	3rd place, bronze medalist(s)

== Triathlon ==
South Korea qualified one athlete based on its performance at the 2018 Asian Youth Olympic Games Qualifier.

Individual

Athlete	Event	Swim (750m)	Trans 1	Bike (20 km)	Trans 2	Run (5 km)	Total Time	Rank
Lee Jung-won	Girls	10:06	0:40	30:15	0:38	21:06	1:02:45	19

Relay

Athlete	Event	Total Times per Athlete (Swim 250m, Bike 6.6 km, Run 1.8 km)	Total Group Time	Rank
Asia 1 Lee Jung-won (KOR); Teppei Tokuyama (JPN); Emma Ada Middleditch (SGP); Daniil Zubtsov (KAZ)	Mixed Relay	22:57 (8); 21:44 (9); 24:01 (7); 23:15 (10)	1:31:57	10
