= Mexico at the 2018 Summer Youth Olympics =

- IOC code: MEX
- NOC: Mexican Olympic Committee
- Website: http://soycom.org/

in Buenos Aires, Argentina 6 – 18 October 2018
- Competitors: 93
- Medals Ranked 20th: Gold 3 Silver 3 Bronze 6 Total 12

Summer Youth Olympics appearances (overview)
- 2010; 2014; 2018; 2026

Mexico participated at the 2018 Summer Youth Olympics in Buenos Aires, Argentina from 6 October to 18 October 2018.

== Medalists ==
Medal	Name	Sport	Event	Notes
Gold	Luis Avilés	Athletics	400 metres	
	Randal Willars	Diving	10 m platform	
	Nicole Meyer (El Capricho Champion)	Equestrian	Team Jumping	Mixed NOC
Silver	Sofía Ramos	Athletics	5000 metre walk	
	Jennifer Yazmin Carrillo	Boxing	-57 kg	
	Natalia Botello	Fencing	Sabre	
Bronze	Stephanie Rodríguez	Canoeing	C1 sprint	
	Gabriela Agúndez	Diving	10 m platform	
	Natalia Botello	Fencing	Mixed team	Mixed NOC

== Archery ==
Mexico qualified two archers based on its performance at the 2017 World Archery Youth Championships.

Individual

Athlete	Event	Ranking round		Round of 32	Round of 16	Quarterfinals	Semifinals	Final / BM	Rank
Athlete	Event	Score	Seed	Opposition Score	Opposition Score	Opposition Score	Opposition Score	Opposition Score	Rank
Carlos Daniel Vaca Cordero	Boys' Individual	680	4	Thompson (GBR)W 6–0	Cadena (COL)W 6–0	Akash (IND)L 4–6	did not advance		5
Valentina Vázquez Cadena	Girls' Individual	659	7	van der Winkel (NED)W 6–2	Tromans-Ansell (GBR)W 7–1	Jones (NZL)W 6–0	Canales (ESP)L 4–6	Son (KOR)L 3–7	4

Team

Athletes	Event	Ranking round		Round of 32	Round of 16	Quarterfinals	Semifinals	Final / BM	Rank
Athletes	Event	Score	Seed	Opposition Score	Opposition Score	Opposition Score	Opposition Score	Opposition Score	Rank
Carlos Daniel Vaca Cordero (MEX) Kang Jin-hwa (PRK)	Mixed team	1288	26	GNoriega (USA) Rodríguez Valero (CUB)W 6–0	Trydvornava (BLR) Ovchynnikov (UKR)W 5–1	Reddig (NAM) Cowles (USA)L 2–6	did not advance		5
Valentina Vázquez Cadena (MEX) Alikhan Mustafin (KAZ)	Mixed team	1305	2	Shapla (BAN) Song (KOR)W 6–2	Reddig (NAM) Cowles (USA)L 2–6	did not advance			9

== Athletics ==
Boy's Events Track and Field

Athlete	Event	Stages				Final	
Athlete	Event	Result	Rank	Result	Rank	Result	Rank
Martin Troera	100 metres	11.39	24	10.88	23	22.27	23
Luis Avilés	400 metres	47.45	1	46.78	2	1:34.23	1st place, gold medalist(s)
Axel Vázquez	800 metres	1:52.44	10	1:53.84	11	3:46.28	9
Alejandro Gil	400 metres hurdles	54.89	10	54.29	7	1:49.18	9
Leopoldo Rincon	1500 metres	4:00.28	14	12:30	8	22 pts	11
Cesar Gómez	2000m steepleachase	5:53.05	11	12:14	7	18 pts	10
Jesus Macho	3000 metres	14:46	14	14:40	14	28.86	14
César Córdova	5000 metre walk	20:39.90	5	DQ			
Jose Manuel López	shot put	17.13	15	17.20	12	34.33	14

Girl's Events Track and Field

Athlete	Event	Stages				Final	
Athlete	Event	Result	Rank	Result	Rank	Result	Rank
Alejandra Ortiz	100 metres	12.52	19	11.82	10	24.34	14
Lorena Rangel	400 metres	57.08	11	56.86	13	1:53.94	12
María Fernanda Patrón	100 metres hurdles	14.14	12	13.68	7	27.82	8
Yara Amador	400 metres hurdles	1:01.63	8	59.91	4	2:01.54	6
Arian Chia	2000m steepleachase	6:52.87	11	14:56	14	25 pts	13
Sofía Ramos	5000 metre walk	22:29.52	2	23:29.45	4	45:58.97	2nd place, silver medalist(s)
Sara Solano	long jump	5.00	13	5.23	14	10.14	14
Claudina Díaz	high jump	1.70	12	1.72	14	3.42	12
Xochitl Montoya	javelin throw	41.74	15	42.03	14	83.77	14

== Basketball ==
Mexico qualified a girls' team based on the U18 3x3 National Federation Ranking.

- Girls' tournament - 1 team of 4 athletes

Event	Group stage					Quarterfinal	Semifinal	Final / BM	
Event	Opposition Score	Opposition Score	Opposition Score	Opposition Score	Rank	Opposition Score	Opposition Score	Opposition Score	Rank
Girls' tournament	IndonesiaW 17–14	FranceL 8–15	ArgentinaL 15–20	AndorraW 21–7	5	did not advance			

Shoot-out contest

Athlete	Event	Qualification		Final					
Athlete	Event	Points	Rank	Round 1	Round 2	Round 3	Round 4	Total	Rank
Karina Esquer	Shoot-out contest	7	4	did not advance					
Martha Tapia	Shoot-out contest	DNS							

== Boxing ==
Girls

Athlete	Event	Preliminaries	Semifinals	Final / RM	Rank
Athlete	Event	Opposition Result	Opposition Result	Opposition Result	Rank
Jennifer Yazmin Carrillo	-57 kg	Moustakim (MAR)W 5-0	Shelford-Edmonds (NZL)W RSC R2 0:48	Somnuek (THA)L 0–5	2nd place, silver medalist(s)

== Canoeing ==
Mexico qualified four boats based on its performance at the 2018 World Qualification Event.

- Boys' C1 - 1 boat
- Boys' K1 - 1 boat
- Girls' C1 - 1 boat
- Girls' K1 - 1 boat

Athlete	Event	Qualification		Repechage		Round of 16	Quarterfinals	Semifinals	Final / BM	Rank
Athlete	Event	Time	Rank	Time	Rank	Opposition Result	Opposition Result	Opposition Result	Opposition Result	Rank
Miguel Adrian Figueroa Vargas	Boys' C1 sprint	1:54.98	5	1:55.00	4	Abdusalomov (UZB)L 1:55.20	did not advance			
Miguel Adrian Figueroa Vargas	Boys' C1 slalom	1:38.38	12	1:35.39	6	did not advance				
Alberto Chávez Contreras	Boys' K1 sprint	1:48.75	9	1:46.75	5	did not advance				
Alberto Chávez Contreras	Boys' K1 slalom	1:28.52	12	1:24.63	9	did not advance				
Stephanie Angie Rodríguez Guzmán	Girls' C1 sprint	2:16.69	2			Hein (USA)W 2:18.53	Santiago (ESP)W 2:16.52	Gonczol (HUN)L 2:16.22	Nurlanova (HUN)W 2:16.04	3rd place, bronze medalist(s)
Stephanie Angie Rodríguez Guzmán	Girls' C1 slalom	2:11.69	16	2:11.69	7	Cullwick (NZL)L 2:02.98	did not advance			
Andrea Rocha Donias	Girls' K1 sprint	2:01.13	9	2:01.10	1	Rendessy (HUN)L 2:02.15	did not advance			
Andrea Rocha Donias	Girls' K1 slalom	1:42.49	19	1:42.96	10	did not advance				

== Cycling ==
Mexico qualified a boys' and girls' combined team based on its ranking in the Youth Olympic Games Junior Nation Rankings. They also qualified a mixed BMX racing team based on its ranking in the Youth Olympic Games BMX Junior Nation Rankings.

Athletes	Event	Cross-Country Eliminator			Time Trial			Criterium		Cross-Country Race			Road Race			Total Pts	Rank
Athletes	Event	Time	Rank	Points	Time	Rank	Points	Rank	Points	Time	Rank	Points	Time	Rank	Points	Total Pts	Rank
Brian Joshua Ivan García Barrón Tomas Aguirre Garza	Boys' Team	1:45.651 1:53.442	14 33	8	8:50.65	6	30	7	50	17:17 17:09	11 11	0	1:31:03 1:31.03	12 17	1	221	5
Fatima Anahi Hijar Marin Katia Elizabeth Martínez Miñarro	Girls' Team	2:01.051 2:08.222	14 24	8	10:27.56	16	1	14	3	16:05 17:42	10 15	0	1:42:19 1:42:19	8 25	20	32	13

Mixed Events

Athletes	Event	Semifinals		Total Pts	Rank
Athletes	Event	Rank	Points	Total Pts	Rank
Eduardo Vargas	Mixed Racing	10	10	12	14
Dayana Hernández	Mixed Racing	15	2	12	14

== Diving ==
Boys'

Athlete	Event	Preliminary		Final	
Athlete	Event	Points	Rank	Points	Rank
Randal Willars	3 m springboard	497.70	8	528.10	5
Randal Willars	10 m platform	544.80	2	609.80	1st place, gold medalist(s)

Girls'

Athlete	Event	Preliminary		Final	
Athlete	Event	Points	Rank	Points	Rank
Gabriela Agundes	3 m springboard	408.20	6	427.70	5
Gabriela Agundes	10 m platform	435.05	2	405.55	3rd place, bronze medalist(s)

Mixed Team

Athlete	Event	Preliminary		Final	
Athlete	Event	Points	Rank	Points	Rank
Gabriela Agundes (MEX) Antonio Volpe (ITA)	Mixed team	—N/a		309.00	10
Helle Tuxen (NOR) Randal Willars (MEX)	Mixed team	—N/a		301.10	11

== Equestrian ==
Mexico qualified a rider based on its performance at the FEI North American Junior Championships.

- Individual Jumping - 1 athlete

Nicole Meyer Robredo

Athlete	Horse	Event	Round 1		Round 2			Total		Jump off		
Athlete	Horse	Event	Penalties	Rank	Penalties	Total	Rank	Penalties	Rank	Penalties	Total	Rank
Nicole Meyer Robredo	El Capricho Champion	Individual Jumping	4	2	8	8	20	12	20	did not advance		
North America Nicole Meyer Robredo (MEX) Mateo Philippe Coles (HAI) Marissa del Pilar Thompson (PAN) Pedro Espinosa (HON) Mattie Hatcher (USA)	El Capricho Champion Quid Du Plessis Canal Del Bajo Kithira Llavaneras Genquina Santa Rosa Valery	Team Jumping	4 # 0 0 0 0 #	0	4 # 0 0 4 # 0	0	0	4 # 0 # 0 0 0	0	38.07 # 34.55 # 34.07 32.16 31.66	97.89	1st place, gold medalist(s)

== Fencing ==
Mexico qualified two athletes based on its performance at the 2018 Cadet World Championship.

Girls'

Athlete	Event	Pool Round		Seed	Round of 16	Quarterfinals	Semifinals	Final / BM	Rank
Athlete	Event	Opposition	Result	Seed	Opposition Score	Opposition Score	Opposition Score	Opposition Score	Rank
Natalia Botello	Sabre	(Belgium) Jolien Corteyn (BEL)	W	1	BYE	(Russia) Kliuchnikova W 15-9	(Belgium) Corteyn W 15-3	(Hungary) Pusztai L 9-15	2nd place, silver medalist(s)
Natalia Botello	Sabre	(South Korea) Lee Ju-eun (KOR)	W	1	BYE	(Russia) Kliuchnikova W 15-9	(Belgium) Corteyn W 15-3	(Hungary) Pusztai L 9-15	2nd place, silver medalist(s)
Natalia Botello	Sabre	(Algeria) Chaima Benadouda (ALG)	W	1	BYE	(Russia) Kliuchnikova W 15-9	(Belgium) Corteyn W 15-3	(Hungary) Pusztai L 9-15	2nd place, silver medalist(s)
Natalia Botello	Sabre	(Russia) Alina Kliuchnikova (RUS)	W	1	BYE	(Russia) Kliuchnikova W 15-9	(Belgium) Corteyn W 15-3	(Hungary) Pusztai L 9-15	2nd place, silver medalist(s)
Natalia Botello	Sabre	(Hong Kong) Ma Ho Chee (HKG)	W	1	BYE	(Russia) Kliuchnikova W 15-9	(Belgium) Corteyn W 15-3	(Hungary) Pusztai L 9-15	2nd place, silver medalist(s)

Boy's

Athlete	Event	Pool Round		Seed	Round of 16	Quarterfinals	Semifinals	Final / BM	Rank
Athlete	Event	Opposition	Result	Seed	Opposition Score	Opposition Score	Opposition Score	Opposition Score	Rank
Diego Cervantes	Foil	(Denmark) Jonas Winterberg-Poulsen (DEN)	W	1	BYE	(Poland) Bem L 12-25	did not advance		5
Diego Cervantes	Foil	(Egypt) Loaay Marouf (EGY)	W	1	BYE	(Poland) Bem L 12-25	did not advance		5
Diego Cervantes	Foil	(Singapore) Matthew Lim (SGP)	W	1	BYE	(Poland) Bem L 12-25	did not advance		5
Diego Cervantes	Foil	(Poland) Maciej Bem (POL)	W	1	BYE	(Poland) Bem L 12-25	did not advance		5
Diego Cervantes	Foil	(Hong Kong) Chan Pak Hei (HKG)	W	1	BYE	(Poland) Bem L 12-25	did not advance		5

Mixed Team

Athletes	Event	Quarterfinals	Semifinals / PM	Bronze Final / PM	Rank
Athletes	Event	Opposition Score	Opposition Score	Opposition Score	Rank
Americas 1 (United States) Emily Vermeule (USA) (5) (United States) May Tieu (USA) (3) (Mexico) Natalia Botello (MEX) (2) (United States) Isaac Herbst (USA) (8) (United States) Kenji Bravo (USA) (2) (United States) Robert Vidovszky (USA) (4)	Mixed team	Americas 2 W 30-15	Asia-Oceanía 1 L 22-23	Europe 3 W 30-24	3rd place, bronze medalist(s)
Ariane Leonard (CAN) (6) Anabella Acurero (VEN) (4) Alexis Anglade (USA) (7) Seraphim Jarov (CAN) (9) Diego Cervantes (MEX) (5) Hudson Santana (PUR) (10)	Mixed team	Americas 1 L 15-30	did not advance		7

== Field hockey ==
=== Boys' ===
Preliminary round

Pos	Team	Pld	W	D	L	GF	GA	GD	Pts	Qualification
1	Argentina (H)	5	5	0	0	36	6	+30	15	Quarterfinals
2	Malaysia	5	4	0	1	31	11	+20	12	Quarterfinals
3	Poland	5	2	0	3	29	17	+12	6	Quarterfinals
4	Zambia	5	2	0	3	29	23	+6	6	Quarterfinals
5	Mexico	5	2	0	3	19	20	−1	6	9th place game
6	Vanuatu	5	0	0	5	5	72	−67	0	11th place game

Source: FIH
Rules for classification: 1) Points; 2) Goal difference; 3) Goals scored; 4) Head-to-head result.
(H) Hosts

7 October 2018
09:30

Poland	6–3	Mexico
T. Bembenek 5'; Nitka 9', 18'; E. Bembenek 12'; Zabłocki 13'; Jarzyński 17'	Report	Villegas 6', 19'; Estrada 16'

Umpires:
Hideki Kinoshita (JPN)
Napoleon Chanamthabam (IND)

8 October 2018
17:00

Malaysia	4–2	Mexico
Anuar 4'; Ishak 8', 19'; Mat 19'	Report	Villegas 14'; Estrada 20'

Umpires:
Hristiyan Vasilev (BUL)
Peter Kabaso (KEN)

9 October 2018
12:30

Mexico	8–3	Vanuatu
Estrada 2', 13'; Hernández 3', 10'; Palma 3'; Villegas 6', 17'; Sosa 18'	Report	Iawila 7'; Job 13', 19'

Umpires:
Napoleon Chanamthabam (IND)
Darren Hubach (RSA)

10 October 2018
14:45

Mexico	6–4	Zambia
Hernández 2'; Estrada 6'; Palma 7'; Villegas 10', 13'; Sosa 15'	Report	Bwali 14', 20'; Mubanga 17', 18'

Umpires:
James Unkles (AUS)
Napoleon Chanamthabam (IND)

11 October 2018
11:00

Argentina	3–0	Mexico
Garrone 2'; Zarate 6'; Sarto 8'	Report

Umpires:
Napoleon Chanamthabam (IND)
Peter Kabaso (KEN)

Ninth and tenth place game

12 October 2018
13:00

Mexico	2–1	Canada
Hernández 3'; Palma 6'	Report	Dhillon 13'

Umpires:
Hideki Kinoshita (JPN)
James Unkles (AUS)

=== Girls' ===
Preliminary round

Pos	Team	Pld	W	D	L	GF	GA	GD	Pts	Qualification
1	China	5	5	0	0	29	1	+28	15	Quarterfinals
2	Australia	5	2	1	2	23	8	+15	7	Quarterfinals
3	Poland	5	2	1	2	4	14	−10	7	Quarterfinals
4	Namibia	5	1	2	2	9	17	−8	5	Quarterfinals
5	Zimbabwe	5	1	1	3	6	23	−17	4	9th place game
6	Mexico	5	0	3	2	5	13	−8	3	11th place game

Source: FIH
Rules for classification: 1) Points; 2) Goal difference; 3) Goals scored; 4) Head-to-head result.

7 October 2018
17:45

Poland	1–1	Mexico
Balcerzak 17'	Report	Cuevas 7'

Umpires:
Margaux Brand (CAN)
Fatma Mahmoud (EGY)

8 October 2018
11:45

China	7–0	Mexico
Cai 3', 10', 15'; Yu 7'; Ma 16', 17'; Zhang 17'	Report

Umpires:
Lize Strydom (RSA)
Ayu Zainuddin (MAS)

9 October 2018
14:45

Mexico	2–2	Namibia
Gonzalez 6', 19'	Report	Cormack 3'; Myburgh 10'

Umpires:
Fatma Mahmoud (EGY)
Gemma Calderon Alcade (ESP)

10 October 2018
09:30

Mexico	1–2	Zimbabwe
Ramirez 19'	Report	A. Terblanche 1'; N. Terblanche 9'

Umpires:
Cynthia Clement (GHA)
Margaux Brand (CAN)

11 October 2018
15:30

Australia	1–1	Mexico
Schonell 20'	Report	Verdugo 13'

Umpires:
Ayu Zainuddin (MAS)
Gemma Calderon (ESP)

Eleventh and twelfth place game

13 October 2018
08:00

Vanuatu	0–5	Mexico
	Report	Cuevas 10', 18', 20'; Ramírez 15', 19'

Umpires:
Cynthia Clement (GHA)
Gemma Calderon (ESP)

== Golf ==
Individual

Athlete	Event	Round 1		Round 2			Round 3			Total		
Athlete	Event	Score	Rank	Score	Total	Rank	Score	Total	Rank	Score	Par	Rank
Maria Fernanda Martinez Almeida	Girls' Individual	71 (+1)	2	77 (+7)	148	19	74 (+4)	222	12	222	+12	11
Alejandro Madariaga Couttolenc	Boys' Individual	74 (+4)	16	75 (+5)	149	17	71 (+1)	220	6	220	+10	13

Team

Athletes	Event	Round 1 (Fourball)		Round 2 (Foursome)		Round 3 (Individual Stroke)				Total		
Athletes	Event	Score	Rank	Score	Rank	Girl	Boy	Total	Rank	Score	Par	Rank
Maria Fernanda Martinez Almeida Alejandro Madariaga Couttolenc	Mixed team	65 (-5)	10	79 (+9)	25	74	70	144 (+4)	7	288	+8	17

== Gymnastics ==
=== Artistic ===
Mexico qualified one gymnast based on its performance at the 2018 American Junior Championship.

Athlete	Event	Apparatus				Total	Rank
Athlete	Event	F	V	UB	BB	Total	Rank
Stephanie Hernández	Qualification	12.400	11.966	11.966	9.266	45.598	23

=== Rhythmic ===
Mexico qualified one gymnast based on its performance at the 2018 American Junior Championship.

Athlete	Event	Apparatus				Total	Rank
Athlete	Event	H	B	C	R	Total	Rank
Xitlali Santana	All-around	10.800	12.650	10.900	10.650	45.000	31

=== Trampoline ===
Mexico qualified one gymnast based on its performance at the 2018 American Junior Championship.

Athlete	Event	1st Routine		2nd Routine		Total	Rank
Athlete	Event	Score	Rank	Score	Rank	Total	Rank
Michelle Mares	individual	41.755	9	48.675	10	90.430	10

== Modern pentathlon ==
Mexico qualified two pentathletes based on its performance at the Pan American Youth Olympic Games Qualifier.

Athlete	Event	Fencing Ranking Round (épée one touch)		Swimming (200 m freestyle)			Fencing Bonus Round (épée one touch)		Combined: Shooting/Running (10 m air pistol)/(3000 m)			Total Points	Final Rank
Athlete	Event	Results	Rank	Time	Rank	Points	Rank	Points	Time	Rank	Points	Total Points	Final Rank
Sergio Flores	Boys' Individual	202	19	2:11.89	14	287	18	0	11:34.64	5	606	1095	11
Melissa Mireles	Girls' Individual	210	16	2:32.75	22	245	13	0	12:53.74	8	527	982	11
Team 10 Dora Nusretglu (TUR) Melissa Mireles (MEX)	Mixed Team	195	14	2:09.37 58.67 1:10.70	19	292	16	1	11:58.42	12	582	1069	15
Team 16 Martha Derrant (MEX) Gianluca Micozzi (ITA)	Mixed Team	215	6	2:23.77 1:18.87 1:04.90	22	263	6	0	13:40.04	22	480	959	22

== Rowing ==
Mexico qualified one boat based on its performance at the 2017 World Junior Rowing Championships. They also qualified a boat in girls' single sculls based on their performance at the American Qualification Regatta.

- Boys' pair – 2 athletes
- Girls' single sculls - 1 athlete

== Sailing ==
Mexico qualified two boats based on their performance at the North American Windsurfing Championship.

- Boys' Techno 293+ - 1 boat
- Girls' Techno 293+ - 1 boat

== Shooting ==
Mexico qualified four sport shooters based on its performance at the American Qualification Tournament.

- Boys' 10m Air Rifle - 1 quota
- Boys' 10m Air Pistol - 1 quota
- Girls' 10m Air Rifle - 1 quota
- Girls' 10m Air Pistol - 1 quota

Individual

Athlete	Event	Qualification		Final	
Athlete	Event	Points	Rank	Points	Rank
Edson Ismael Ramírez Ramos	Boys' 10 m air rifle	615.3	15	did not advance	
Gabriela Fernanda Martínez López	Girls' 10 m air rifle	615.1	14	did not advance	
Sebastian Hernández García	Boys' 10 m air pistol	547	19	did not advance	
Andrea Victoria Ibarra Miranda	Girls' 10 m air pistol	559	9	did not advance	

Mixed

Athlete	Event	Qualification		Round of 16	Quarterfinal	Semifinal	Final	
Athlete	Event	Points	Rank	Opposition Score	Opposition Score	Opposition Score	Opposition Score	Rank
Andrea Victoria Ibarra Miranda (MEX) Dmytro Honta (UKR)	Mixed 10 metre air pistol	738	16 Q	Mak (SGP) Salavati (IRI)W 10-5	Campostrini (ITA) Zorge (LAT)W 10-8	Bhaker (IND) Fayzullaev (TJK)L 3-10	al-Kaabi (IRQ) Son (BEL)W 10-4	3rd place, bronze medalist(s)
Anastasiia Dereviagina (RUS) Edson Ramírez (MEX)	Mixed 10m air rifle	825.1	6 Q	Malić (SRB) Dizdarević (BIH)W 10–4	Rossiter (AUS) Babayan (ARM)W 10–4	Martínez (MEX) Wadlegger (AUT)W 10–8	Erdenechuluun (MGL) Pekler (HUN)L 9–10	2nd place, silver medalist(s)
Martínez (MEX) Wadlegger (AUT)	Mixed 10m air rifle	823.0	10 Q	Takagi (JPN) Ulbrich (GER)W 10–7	Chen (TPE) Sharar (BAN)W 10–8	Anastasiia Dereviagina (RUS) Edson Ramírez (MEX)L 8–10	Kemppi (FIN) Firmapaz (ARG)L 7–10	4

== Triathlon ==
Mexico qualified two athletes based on its performance at the 2018 American Youth Olympic Games Qualifier.

Individual

Athlete	Event	Swim (750m)	Trans 1	Bike (20 km)	Trans 2	Run (5 km)	Total Time	Rank
Javier Antonio de la Peña Schott	Boys	9:40	0:32	28:40	0:26	16:27	55:45	12
Sofia Rodríguez Moreno	Girls	10:39	0:50	31:14	0:34	17:49	1:01:06	12

Relay

Athlete	Event	Total Times per Athlete (Swim 250m, Bike 6.6 km, Run 1.8 km)	Total Group Time	Rank
Americas 1 Paula Vega (ECU) Cristobal Baeza Muñoz (CHI) Sofia Rodríguez Moreno (MEX) Andrew Shellenberger (USA)	Mixed Relay	22:11 (3): - -	DNF	
Americas 2 Karina Clemant (VEN) Cristian Andres Triana Peña (COL) Giovanna Lacerda (BRA) Javier Antonio de la Peña Schott (MEX)	Mixed Relay	23:23 (11) 21:26 (6) 23:49 (6) 22:01 (7)	1:30:39 1P	6

== Weightlifting ==
Mexico qualified two athletes based on its performance at the 2017 World Youth Championships.

Boy

Athlete	Event	Snatch		Clean & Jerk		Total	Rank
Athlete	Event	Result	Rank	Result	Rank	Total	Rank
Mauricio Cristofer Canul Facundo	−69 kg	127	3	156	2	283	3rd place, bronze medalist(s)

Girl

Athlete	Event	Snatch		Clean & jerk		Total	Rank
Athlete	Event	Result	Rank	Result	Rank	Total	Rank
Yesica Yadira Hernández Vieyra	−48 kg	74	2	97	1	171	1st place, gold medalist(s)

== Wrestling ==
Key:
- VFA – Victory by Fall
- VSU – Without any points scored by the opponent
- VSU1 – With point(s) scored by the opponent
- VPO – Without any points scored by the opponent
- VPO1 – With point(s) scored by the opponent

Boys

Athlete	Event	Group stage			Final / RM	Rank
Athlete	Event	Opposition Score	Opposition Score	Rank	Opposition Score	Rank
Axel Salas	Greco-Roman −51kg	Sasaki (JPN)L 1 – 10 ^{VSU1}	Jouini (TUN)W 10 – 8 ^{VPO1}	2 Q	Lovera (ARG)W 5 – 3 ^{VPO1}	3rd place, bronze medalist(s)
Miguel Ugalde	Greco-Roman −60kg	Kellner (NZL)W 8 – 0 ^{VSU}	Sadyrov (KGZ)L 6 – 9 ^{VPO1}	2 Q	Hovhannisyan (ARM)L 0 – 9 ^{VSU}	4
Luis Orozco	freestyle −110kg	Kozyrev (RUS)L 1 – 4 ^{VPO1}	Velinov (MKD)W 4 – 0 ^{VFA}	2 Q	Khalil (EGY)L 2 – 6 ^{VPO1}	4

Girls

Athlete	Event	Group stage					Final / RM	Rank
Athlete	Event	Opposition Score	Opposition Score	Opposition Score	Opposition Score	Rank	Opposition Score	Rank
Andrea López	freestyle −57kg	Ozaki (JPN)L 2 – 8 ^{VFA}	Ahmed (EGY)W 8 – 2 ^{VPO1}	Quintanilla (GUM)W 4 – 0 ^{VFA}	Blayvas (GER)L 0 – 2 ^{VFA}	3 Q	Parra (VEN)W 7 – 0 ^{VPO}	5
Sandra Escamilla	freestyle −65kg	Tamir (MGL)L 1 – 4 ^{VFA}	Ramírez (CUB)L 1 – 2 ^{VPO1}	Zhou (CHN)L 0 – 3 ^{VPO}	Capezan (ROU)L 0 – 10 ^{VSU}	5 Q	Nabaina (CMR)W WO	9
