= Rugby sevens at the 2018 Summer Youth Olympics =

Rugby sevens at the III Summer Youth Olympic Games
- Venue: Club Atlético de San Isidro
- Dates: 13–15 October
- No. of events: 2 (1 boys, 1 girls)

The rugby sevens tournament at the 2018 Summer Youth Olympics was held from 13 to 15 October in Buenos Aires, Argentina.

12 rugby sevens teams, total 144 athletes, participated in the tournament. The rugby sevens competition took place at Club Atlético de San Isidro in San Isidro.

== Qualification ==
Each National Olympic Committee (NOC) is limited to participation in 1 team sports (Futsal, Beach handball, Field Hockey, and Rugby Sevens) per each gender with the exception of the host country who can enter one team per sport. Also at rugby sevens each NOC can enter a maximum of 1 team of 12 athletes per both genders. To be eligible to participate in the Youth Olympics, athletes must have been born between 1 January 2000 and 31 December 2001.

As hosts, Argentina has the right to directly qualify 1 team per both genders on account of Sudamérica Rugby quota. The best ranked NOC in each of the 5 Continental Qualification Tournaments will obtain quota place.

- 1 quota for boys' event given to host country, the member of Sudamérica Rugby.
- 1 quota for girls' event given to Sudamérica Rugby.
- 1 quota per each gender are given to Rugby Africa, Asia Rugby, Rugby Europe, Rugby Americas North, Oceania Rugby

=== Boys' qualification ===
Mean of qualification	Date	Host	Vacancies	Qualified
Host nation	—	—	1	Argentina
2017 Asia Rugby U17 Sevens	9–10 September 2017	(Chinese Taipei) Tainan	1	Japan
North American Qualifier	2–4 March 2018	(United States) Las Vegas	1	United States^{A}
Oceanian Qualifier	21–22 April 2018	(Australia) Sydney	1	Samoa^{A}
2018 U18 European Sevens Championship	5–6 May 2018	(Lithuania) Šiauliai	1	France
2018 African Youth Games	19–21 July 2018	(Algeria) Algiers	1	South Africa
South American Qualifier	—	—	0	—
Total			6	

^A Canada and Australia won their respective tournaments, but through team sports quotas are sending their boys' field hockey teams instead. As such, the United States and Samoa qualify in their place as respective runners-up.

=== Girls' qualification ===
Mean of qualification	Date	Host	Vacancies	Qualified
2017 ARU Girls' Sevens Championships	29–30 November 2017	United Arab Emirates	1	Kazakhstan^{B}
North American Qualifier	2–4 March 2018	(United States) Las Vegas	1	Canada
South American Qualifier	3–4 March 2018	(Brazil) São José dos Campos	1	Colombia
Oceanian Qualifier	21–22 April 2018	(Australia) Sydney	1	New Zealand
2018 U18 Women's European Sevens Championship	28–29 April 2018	(France) Vichy	1	France
2018 African Youth Games	19–21 July 2018	(Algeria) Algiers	1	Tunisia
Total			6	

^B Japan won the Asian championships, but through team sports quotas is sending its girls' futsal team instead. Kazakhstan is the next best ranked team without a team qualified for girls.

== Medal summary ==
=== Medal table ===
* Host nation (Argentina)

Rank	Nation	Gold	Silver	Bronze	Total
1	Argentina*	1	0	0	1
1	New Zealand	1	0	0	1
3	France	0	2	0	2
4	Canada	0	0	1	1
4	Japan	0	0	1	1
Totals (5 entries)		2	2	2	6

=== Medalists ===
Event	Gold	Silver	Bronze
Boys	Argentina; Lucio Cinti; Ramiro Costa; Marcos Elicagaray; Juan González; Matteo Graziano; Julián Hernández; Ignacio Mendy; Marcos Moneta; Bautista Pedemonte; Julián Quetglas; Nicolás Roger; Tomás Vanni	France; Dorian Bellot; Erwan Dridi; Martin Dulon; Baptiste Germain; Sasha Gue; Théo Louvet; Yoram Moefana; Yann Peysson; Calum Randle; Cheikh Tiberghien; Joachim Trouabal; Tani Vili	Japan; Ryo Eto; Kentaro Fujii; Kanji Futamura; Kippei Ishida; Ryosuke Kan; Taisei Konishi; Tyler Main; Junya Matsumoto; Kaito Nakanishi; Jo Ohba; Haruhiko Uemura; Hibiki Yamada
Girls	New Zealand; Carys Dallinger; Tiana Davison; Tynealle Fitzgerald; Iritana Hohaia; Azalleyah Maaka; Mahina Paul; Risaleaana Pouri-Lane; Kiani Tahere; Montessa Tairakena; Kalyn Takitimu-Cook; Arorangi Tauranga; Hinemoa Watene	France; Axelle Berthoumieu; Alycia Christiaens; Mélanie Daumalle; Charlotte Escudero; Lucy Hapulat; Salomé Maran; Alice Muller; Lou Noel; Aurélie Plantefeve; Méline Puech; Celia Roue; Chloé Sanz	Canada; Delaney Aikens; Taylor Black; Kendra Cousineau; Hunter Czeppel; Olivia De Couvreur; Brooklynn Feasby; Elizabeth Gibson; Madison Grant; Carmen Izyk; Aliesha Lewis; Maggie Mackinnon; Keyara Wardley
