= Rugby sevens at the 2018 Summer Youth Olympics – Girls' tournament =

Rugby sevens tournament

2018 Summer Youth Olympics
Tournament details
- Host: Argentina
- Venue: Club Atlético San Isidro
- Date: 13–15 October 2018
- Teams: 6

Tournament statistics
- Matches played: 18

The girls' tournament at the 2018 Summer Youth Olympics was held at the Club Atlético San Isidro from 13 to 15 October 2018.

== Group stage ==
All times are Argentina Time (UTC–3).

Pos	Team	Pld	W	D	L	PF	PA	PD	Pts
1	New Zealand	5	5	0	0	169	27	+142	15
2	France	5	4	0	1	178	45	+133	13
3	Canada	5	3	0	2	125	85	+40	11
4	Colombia	5	2	0	3	66	119	−53	9
5	Kazakhstan	5	1	0	4	44	142	−98	7
6	Tunisia	5	0	0	5	19	183	−164	5

Source: Buenos Aires 2018
Rules for classification: 1) Points; 2) Head-to-head result; 3) Point difference; 4) Points scored.

13 October 2018
12:00

New Zealand	53–0	Tunisia
Try: Davison 0'c Pouri-Lane 3'm Maaka 5'm Tairakena 7'm Hohaia (2) 7'c, 10'c Paul 9'm Takitimu-Cook 12'c Tauranga 13'm Con: Pouri-Lane (2/6) 1', 8'; Takitimu-Cook (2/4) 11', 12'	Report

Club Atlético San Isidro, Buenos Aires
Referee: Maddy Putz (Australia)

13 October 2018
12:25

France	47–0	Colombia
Try: Noel 1'm Christiaens (2) 5'c, 10'c Daumalle (2) 7'c, 8'c Hapulat 11'c Roue 14'c Con: Maran (4/5) 6', 10', 12', 14'; Christiaens (2/2) 7', 8'	Report

Club Atlético San Isidro, Buenos Aires
Referee: Ashleigh Murray (South Africa)

13 October 2018
12:50

Canada	24–15	Kazakhstan
Try: Grant 2'c Black 4'm de Couvreur 6'm Izyk 13'c Con: Black (2/4) 2', 13'	Report	Try: Odnoletok (3) 8'm, 10'm, 12'm Con: Mikhailenko (0/3)

Club Atlético San Isidro, Buenos Aires
Referee: Lauren Jenner (New Zealand)

13 October 2018
15:05

New Zealand	38–5	Colombia
Try: Hohaia 0'c Dallinger 2'c Pouri-Lane 5'c Takitimu-Cook 8'c Tairakena 10'm Fitzgerald 14'm Con: Pouri-Lane (4/5) 1', 3', 6', 9'; Dallinger (0/1)	Report	Try: Mejia 12'm Con: Ibarra (0/1)

Club Atlético San Isidro, Buenos Aires
Referee: Katherine Ritchie (Great Britain)

13 October 2018
15:30

France	45–0	Kazakhstan
Try: Christiaens (3) 3'c, 4'm, 10'c Sanz 6'c Daumalle 7'c Hapulat 12'm Muller 14'c Con: Plantefeve (2/3) 3', 7'; Christiaens (1/1) 6'; Maran (2/3) 11', 14'	Report

Club Atlético San Isidro, Buenos Aires
Referee: Lauren Jenner (New Zealand)

13 October 2018
15:55

Canada	50–7	Tunisia
Try: Cousineau (3) 0'c, 7'm, 8'm Grant (2) 3'c, 5'c de Couvreur 7'c Mackinnon 13'm Izyk 14'c Con: Black (3/3) 1', 3', 5'; Czeppel (2/5) 7', 14'	Report	Try: Arbi 12'c Con: Ben Charrada (1/1) 12'

Club Atlético San Isidro, Buenos Aires
Referee: Ashleigh Murray (South Africa)

14 October 2018
12:00

New Zealand	26–12	France
Try: Watene 4'c Tairakena (2) 6'm, 8'c Pouri-Lane 11'c Con: Pouri-Lane (3/4) 4', 9', 11'	Report	Try: Berthoumieu 2'm Muller 13'c Con: Christiaens (1/1) 13'; Maran (0/1)

Club Atlético San Isidro, Buenos Aires
Referee: Ashleigh Murray (South Africa)

14 October 2018
12:25

Canada	27–10	Colombia
Try: Lewis 1'm Aikens (2) 2'm, 14'm Black 4'm Wardley 10'c Con: Black (1/4) 10'; Cousineau (0/1)	Report	Try: Mejia 11'm Jimenez 13'; Con: Tapias (0/1)

Club Atlético San Isidro, Buenos Aires
Referee: Maddy Putz (Australia)

14 October 2018
12:50

Tunisia	5–24	Kazakhstan
Try: Barhoumi 14'm Con: Barhoumi (0/1)	Report	Try: Odnoletok (3) 0'c, 4'c, 11'm Boichenko 13'm Con: Kamenkova (2/3) 0', 4'; Mikhailenko (0/1)

Club Atlético San Isidro, Buenos Aires
Referee: Katherine Ritchie (Great Britain)

14 October 2018
15:05

New Zealand	20–5	Canada
Try: Maaka 7'm Tairakena (2) 10'm, 12'm Risaleaana Pouri-Lane 13'm Con: Risaleaana Pouri-Lane (0/4)	Report	Try: Wardley 4'm Con: Black (0/1)

Club Atlético San Isidro, Buenos Aires
Referee: Katherine Ritchie (Great Britain)

14 October 2018
15:30

France	41–0	Tunisia
Try: Noel (3) 2'm, 5'c, 13'm Muller 7'c Plantefeve 10'm Hapulat (2) 12'm, 14'c Con: Maran (3/7) 5', 7', 14'	Report

Club Atlético San Isidro, Buenos Aires
Referee: Lauren Jenner (New Zealand)

14 October 2018
15:55

Colombia	36–0	Kazakhstan
Try: Ibarra (3) 2'm, 6'c, 11'm Tapias 4'm Ramirez 7'c Mejia 14'c Con: Tapias (2/5) 7', 7'; Mejia (1/1) 14'	Report

Club Atlético San Isidro, Buenos Aires
Referee: Maddy Putz (Australia)

15 October 2018
9:50

New Zealand	32–5	Kazakhstan
Try: Takitimu-Cook 6'm Tairakena 8'm Watene 10'c Dallinger 11'm Tahere (2) 12'm, 14'm Con: Pouri-Lane (1/6) 10'	Report	Try: Odnoletok 0'm Con: Mikhailenko (0/1)

Club Atlético San Isidro, Buenos Aires
Referee: Katherine Ritchie (Great Britain)

15 October 2018
10:15

France	33–19	Canada
Try: Escudero 3'c Hapulat (3) 7'm, 9'c, 13'c Christiaens 11'c Con: Christiaens (3/4) 3', 9', 11'; Maran (1/1) 14'	Report	Try: Aikens (2) 0'm, 7'c Con: Black (1/2) 7'

Club Atlético San Isidro, Buenos Aires
Referee: Maddy Putz (Australia)

15 October 2018
10:40

Colombia	15–7	Tunisia
Try: Mejia 7'm Sarmeinto 10'm Ramirez 12'm Con: Tapias (0/3)	Report	Try: Arbi 14'c Con: Ben Arous (1/1) 14'

Club Atlético San Isidro, Buenos Aires
Referee: Lauren Jenner (New Zealand)

== Placement rounds ==
=== Fifth place game ===
15 October 2018
13:55

Kazakhstan	12–0	Tunisia
Try: Odnoletok (2) 1'c, 12'm Con: Mikhailenko (1/2) 1'	Report

Club Atlético San Isidro, Buenos Aires
Referee: Katherine Ritchie (Great Britain)

=== Bronze medal game ===
15 October 2018
14:45

(bronze) Canada	24–19	Colombia
Try: Grant (2) 1'm, 11'c Black 3'c Izyk 12'm Con: Black (2/4) 4', 11'	Report	Try: Tapias 5'; Ibarra 7'm Mejia 9'c Con: Tapias (2/2) 6', 10'; Mejia (0/1)

Club Atlético San Isidro, Buenos Aires
Referee: Lauren Jenner (New Zealand)

=== Gold medal game ===
15 October 2018
15:35

(gold) New Zealand	15–12	France (silver)
Try: Tairakena 0'm Hohaia 4'm Mahina 11'm Con: Pouri-Lane (0/3)	Report	Try: Christiaens 6'c Hapulat 9'm Con: Christiaens (1/2) 7'

Club Atlético San Isidro, Buenos Aires
Referee: Ashleigh Murray (South Africa)

== Final ranking ==
Rank	Team	Players
1st place, gold medalist(s)	New Zealand	Kalyn Takitimu-Cook, Arorangi Tauranga, Tynealle Fitzgerald, Hinemoa Watene, Azalleyah Maaka, Carys Dallinger, Risi Pouri-Lane, Mahina Paul, Tiana Davison, Kiani Tahere, Iritana Hohaia, Montessa Tairakena
2nd place, silver medalist(s)	France	Charlotte Escudero, Aurélie Plantefève, Célia Roué, Méline Puech, Alycia Christiaens, Mélanie Daumalle, Lou Noël, Lucy Hapulat, Axelle Berthoumieu, Salomé Maran, Chloé Sanz, Alice Muller
3rd place, bronze medalist(s)	Canada	Brooklynn Feasby, Carmen Izyk, Delaney Aikens, Hunter Czeppel, Keyara Wardley, Lizzy Gibson, Maggie Mackinnon, Liv de Couvreur, Taylor Black, Maddy Grant, Aliesha Lewis, Kendra Cousineau
4	Colombia	Isabel Ramírez, Stefania Sarmiento, Carmen Ibarra, Valeria Muñoz, Karen Cárdenas, Isabella Pérez, Silvia Pereira, Marta Jiménez, Valentina Tapias, Laura Mejía, Marcela Osorio, Leidy Soto
5	Kazakhstan	Viktoriya Mikhailenko, Zhanelya Nursilanova, Nargiza Bekezhanova, Xeniya Kim, Marina Volodina, Vasilisa Yakimchuk, Vera Boichenko, Yekaterina Kamenkova, Russalina Fedorova, Olga Nosovskaya, Vlada Odnoletok
6	Tunisia	Abir Dhahri, Halima Ben Charrada, Sabrine Barhoumi, Maissa Haouani, Amna ben Arous, Chaima Arbi, Amna Zarai, Khouloud Hammami, Jihen Fatnassi, Abir Ragoubi, Lamia Mlawah, Hajer Saoudi

== See also ==
- Rugby sevens at the 2018 Summer Youth Olympics – Boys' tournament
