= Colombia at the 2018 Summer Youth Olympics =

- IOC code: COL
- NOC: Colombian Olympic Committee
- Website: www.olimpicocol.co (in Spanish)

in Buenos Aires, Argentina 6 – 18 October 2018
- Competitors: 53 in 15 sports
- Flag bearer: Daniel Restrepo
- Medals Ranked 14th: Gold 4 Silver 3 Bronze 3 Total 10

Summer Youth Olympics appearances (overview)
- 2010; 2014; 2018; 2026

Colombia participated at the 2018 Summer Youth Olympics in Buenos Aires, Argentina from 6 October to 18 October 2018.

== Medalists ==
Medals awarded to participants of mixed-NOCs teams are represented in italics. These medals are not counted towards the individual NOC medal tally.

Medal	Name	Sport	Event	Date
Gold	Jhony Angulo	Roller speed skating	Boys' combined	8 October
Gold	Gabriela Rueda	Roller speed skating	Girls' combined	8 October
Gold	Daniel Restrepo	Diving	Boys' 3m springboard	14 October
Gold	Valeria Cabezas	Athletics	Girls' 400 metre hurdles	16 October
Gold	Daniel Restrepo	Diving	Mixed team	17 October
Silver	Yineth Santoya	Weightlifting	Girls' 48 kg	8 October
Silver	Kely Junkar	Weightlifting	Girls' 53 kg	9 October
Silver	Juan Montealegre	Judo	Mixed team	10 October
Silver	Camila Osorio; Nicolás Mejía	Tennis	Mixed doubles	14 October
Bronze	Gabriela Bolle; Juan Ramírez	Cycling	Mixed BMX racing	7 October
Bronze	Estiven Villar	Weightlifting	Boys' 62 kg	8 October
Bronze	Camila Osorio	Tennis	Girls' singles	13 October

== Archery ==
Colombia qualified one archer based on its performance at the 2017 World Archery Youth Championships.

Individual

Athlete	Event	Ranking round		Round of 32	Round of 16	Quarterfinals	Semifinals	Final / BM	Rank
Athlete	Event	Score	Seed	Opposition Score	Opposition Score	Opposition Score	Opposition Score	Opposition Score	Rank
David Cadena	Boys' Individual	667	13	Eyeni (CIV); W 6–4	Vaca Cordero (MEX); L 0–6	did not advance			9

Team

Athletes	Event	Ranking round		Round of 32	Round of 16	Quarterfinals	Semifinals	Final / BM	Rank
Athletes	Event	Score	Seed	Opposition Score	Opposition Score	Opposition Score	Opposition Score	Opposition Score	Rank
David Cadena (COL); Sogand Rahmani (IRI)	Mixed team	1298	21	Hnin (MYA); Ak (TUR); L 0–6	did not advance				17

== Cycling ==
Colombia qualified a girls' combined team based on its ranking in the Youth Olympic Games Junior Nation Rankings. They also qualified a mixed BMX racing team based on its ranking in the Youth Olympic Games BMX Junior Nation Rankings and two athletes in BMX freestyle based on its performance at the 2018 Urban Cycling World Championship.

- Girls' combined team - 1 team of 2 athletes
- Mixed BMX racing team - 1 team of 2 athletes
- Mixed BMX freestyle - 1 boy and 1 girl

== Diving ==
Athlete	Event	Preliminary		Final	
Athlete	Event	Points	Rank	Points	Rank
Daniel Restrepo	Boys' 3 m springboard	511.95	6	576.05	1st place, gold medalist(s)
Daniel Restrepo	Boys' 10 m platform	454.95	7	370.85	12
Lin Shan (CHN); Daniel Restrepo (COL)	Mixed team	—N/a		391.35	1st place, gold medalist(s)

== Gymnastics ==
=== Rhythmic ===
Colombia qualified one gymnast based on its performance at the 2018 American Junior Championship.

- Girls' rhythmic individual all-around - 1 quota

== Judo ==
Individual

Athlete	Event	Round of 16	Quarterfinals	Semifinals	Rep 1	Rep 2	Rep 3	Final / BM	Rank
Athlete	Event	Opposition Result	Opposition Result	Opposition Result	Opposition Result	Opposition Result	Opposition Result	Opposition Result	Rank
Juan Montealegre	Boys' 55 kg	Yuri Israelyan (ARM); W 01s1-00	Temuujin Ganburged (MGL); L 00s3-10	did not advance	Ariel Shulman (ISR); L 00–10	did not advance			
Nikol Pencue	Girls' 63 kg	Bye	Hasret Bozkurt (TUR); W 10s1-000	Mariem Khlifi (TUN); L 00-01s1	Bye			Kim Ju-hee (KOR); L 00s1-01	4

Team

Athletes	Event	Round of 16	Quarterfinals	Semifinals	Final	
Athletes	Event	Opposition Result	Opposition Result	Opposition Result	Opposition Result	Rank
Team Athens; Mireille Andriamifehy (MAD); Martin Bezděk (CZE); Juan Montealegre (COL); Javier Peña Insausti (ESP); Christi Rose Pretorius (ZIM); Tababi Devi Thangjam (IND); Marin Visser (NED); Anwar Zrhari (MAR)	Mixed team	Bye	Team Los Angeles (MIX); W 5–3	Team Rio de Janeiro (MIX); W 5–3	Team Beijing (MIX); L 4–5	2nd place, silver medalist(s)
Barcelona; Mikaela Rojas (ARG); Sosorbaram Lkhagvasuren (MGL); Nikol Pencue (COL); Margarita Gritsenko (KAZ); Loreince Nanekoula (GAB); Jalen Kon Elijah (CMR); Mark van Dijk (NED)	Mixed team	Atlanta (MIX); L 3–4	did not advance			9

== Roller speed skating ==
Colombia qualified two roller skaters based on its performance at the 2018 Roller Speed Skating World Championship.

- Boys' combined speed event - Jhony Angulo
- Girls' combined speed event - Gabriela Rueda

== Rugby sevens ==
Colombia qualified their national women's team in March 2018.

- Girls' tournament - 1 team of 12 athletes

=== Girls' tournament ===
Group stage

Pos	Team	Pld	W	D	L	PF	PA	PD	Pts
1	New Zealand	5	5	0	0	169	27	+142	15
2	France	5	4	0	1	178	45	+133	13
3	Canada	5	3	0	2	125	85	+40	11
4	Colombia	5	2	0	3	66	119	−53	9
5	Kazakhstan	5	1	0	4	44	142	−98	7
6	Tunisia	5	0	0	5	19	183	−164	5

Source: Buenos Aires 2018
Rules for classification: 1) Points; 2) Head-to-head result; 3) Point difference; 4) Points scored.

13 October 2018
12:25

France	47–0	Colombia
Try: Noel 1'm Christiaens (2) 5'c, 10'c Daumalle (2) 7'c, 8'c Hapulat 11'c Roue 14'c Con: Maran (4/5) 6', 10', 12', 14'; Christiaens (2/2) 7', 8'	Report

Club Atlético San Isidro, Buenos Aires
Referee: Ashleigh Murray (South Africa)

13 October 2018
15:05

New Zealand	38–5	Colombia
Try: Hohaia 0'c Dallinger 2'c Pouri-Lane 5'c Takitimu-Cook 8'c Tairakena 10'm Fitzgerald 14'm Con: Pouri-Lane (4/5) 1', 3', 6', 9'; Dallinger (0/1)	Report	Try: Mejia 12'm Con: Ibarra (0/1)

Club Atlético San Isidro, Buenos Aires
Referee: Katherine Ritchie (Great Britain)

14 October 2018
12:25

Canada	27–10	Colombia
Try: Lewis 1'm Aikens (2) 2'm, 14'm Black 4'm Wardley 10'c Con: Black (1/4) 10'; Cousineau (0/1)	Report	Try: Mejia 11'm Jimenez 13'; Con: Tapias (0/1)

Club Atlético San Isidro, Buenos Aires
Referee: Maddy Putz (Australia)

14 October 2018
15:55

Colombia	36–0	Kazakhstan
Try: Ibarra (3) 2'm, 6'c, 11'm Tapias 4'm Ramirez 7'c Mejia 14'c Con: Tapias (2/5) 7', 7'; Mejia (1/1) 14'	Report

Club Atlético San Isidro, Buenos Aires
Referee: Maddy Putz (Australia)

15 October 2018
10:40

Colombia	15–7	Tunisia
Try: Mejia 7'm Sarmeinto 10'm Ramirez 12'm Con: Tapias (0/3)	Report	Try: Arbi 14'c Con: Ben Arous (1/1) 14'

Club Atlético San Isidro, Buenos Aires
Referee: Lauren Jenner (New Zealand)

Bronze medal match

15 October 2018
14:45

(bronze) Canada	24–19	Colombia
Try: Grant (2) 1'm, 11'c Black 3'c Izyk 12'm Con: Black (2/4) 4', 11'	Report	Try: Tapias 5'; Ibarra 7'm Mejia 9'c Con: Tapias (2/2) 6', 10'; Mejia (0/1)

Club Atlético San Isidro, Buenos Aires
Referee: Lauren Jenner (New Zealand)

== Shooting ==
Colombia qualified one sport shooter based on its performance at the American Qualification Tournament.

- Girls' 10m Air Pistol - 1 quota

Individual

Athlete	Event	Qualification		Final	
Athlete	Event	Points	Rank	Points	Rank
Juana Rueda	Girls' 10 metre air pistol	552-6	15	did not advance	

Team

Athletes	Event	Qualification		Round of 16	Quarterfinals	Semifinals	Final / BM	
Athletes	Event	Points	Rank	Opposition Result	Opposition Result	Opposition Result	Opposition Result	Rank
Juana Rueda (COL); Jan Luca Karstedt (GER)	Mixed 10 metre air pistol	750	6 Q	Khutsiberidze (GEO); Ng (CAN); W 10–7	Vanessa Seeger (GER); Kiril Kirov (BUL); L 5–10	did not advance		

== Taekwondo ==
Athlete	Event	Round of 16	Quarterfinals	Semifinals	Final	
Athlete	Event	Opposition Result	Opposition Result	Opposition Result	Opposition Result	Rank
Laura Ayala	Girls' +63 kg	—N/a	Mu Wenzhe (CHN); L 17–28	did not advance		

== Tennis ==
Singles

Athlete	Event	Round of 32	Round of 16	Quarterfinals	Semifinals	Final / BM	
Athlete	Event	Opposition Score	Opposition Score	Opposition Score	Opposition Score	Opposition Score	Rank
Nicolás Mejía	Boys' singles	Štyler (CZE); L (4–6, 2–6)	did not advance				17
Camila Osorio	Girls' singles	Carlé (ARG); W (7^{7}-6^{4}, 7–5)	Cocciaretto (ITA); W (1–6, 7-6^{2}, 7–5)	Naito (JPN); W (6^{5}-7^{7}, 6–3, 6–1)	Burel (FRA); L (4–6, 5–7)	Wang (CHN); W (7-6^{4}, 6–0)	3rd place, bronze medalist(s)

Doubles

Athletes	Event	Round of 32	Round of 16	Quarterfinals	Semifinals	Final / BM	
Athletes	Event	Opposition Score	Opposition Score	Opposition Score	Opposition Score	Opposition Score	Rank
Nicolás Mejía; Gilbert Soares Klier Júnior (BRA)	Boys' doubles	—N/a	Baird (USA) / Boyer (USA); W (6–3, 7-6^{6})	Andreev (BUL) / Hijikata (AUS); L (6^{6}-7, 6–4, [7-10])	did not advance		5
Camila Osorio; María Lourdes Carlé (ARG)	Girls' doubles	—N/a	Nahimana (BDI) / Rivera Corado (GUA); W (6–4, 6–4)	Rakhimova (RUS) / Selekhmeteva (RUS); W (7–5, 3–6, [10-7])	Juvan (SLO) / Świątek (POL); L (2–6, 2–6)	Wang Xinyu (CHN) / Wang Xiyu (CHN); L (5–7, 3–6)	4
Nicolás Mejía; Camila Osorio	Mixed doubles	Liang (TPE) / Ho (TPE); W (5–7, 6–3, [10-8])	Wang Xiyu (CHN) / Tashbulatov (KAZ); W (4–6, 6–4, [10-8])	Selekhmeteva (RUS) / López Montagud (ESP); W (6–1, 6–3)	Sun (SUI) / Wenger (SUI); W (6–3, 7^{7}-6^{4})	Naito (JPN) / Tajima (JPN); L (2–6, 3–6)	2nd place, silver medalist(s)

== Triathlon ==
Colombia qualified two athletes based on its performance at the 2018 American Youth Olympic Games Qualifier.

Individual

Athlete	Event	Swim (750m)	Trans 1	Bike (20 km)	Trans 2	Run (5 km)	Total Time	Rank
Cristian Andres Triana Peña	Boys	9:47	0:26	27:30	0:28	17:17	55:28	11
Maria Fernanda Barbosa Sánchez	Girls	10:47	0:45	33:04	0:32	19:18	1:04:26	24

Relay

Athlete	Event	Total Times per Athlete (Swim 250m, Bike 6.6 km, Run 1.8 km)	Total Group Time	Rank
Americas 2 Karina Clemant (VEN); Cristian Andres Triana Peña (COL); Giovanna Lacerda (BRA); Javier Antonio de la Peña Schott (MEX)	Mixed Relay	23:23 (11); 21:26 (6); 23:49 (6); 22:01 (7)	1:30:39 1P	6
Americas 3 Delfina Orlandini (ARG); Gabriel Terán Carvajal (ECU); Maria Fernanda Barbosa Sánchez (COL); Solen Wood (CAN)	Mixed Relay	22:49 (7); 21:27 (7); 24:52 (9); 22:35 (8)	1:31:43	7

== Weightlifting ==
Colombia qualified three athletes based on its performance at the 2017 World Youth Championships.

Boys

Athlete	Event	Snatch		Clean & Jerk		Total	Rank
Athlete	Event	Result	Rank	Result	Rank	Total	Rank
Estiven Villar	−62 kg	115	3	145	2	260	3rd place, bronze medalist(s)

Girls

Athlete	Event	Snatch		Clean & jerk		Total	Rank
Athlete	Event	Result	Rank	Result	Rank	Total	Rank
Yineth Santoya	−48 kg	76	1	86	3	162	2nd place, silver medalist(s)
Kely Junkar	−48 kg	78	1	98	2	176	2nd place, silver medalist(s)

== Wrestling ==
Key:
- VFA – Victory by Fall
- VSU – Without any point scored by the opponent
- VSU1 – With point(s) scored by the opponent
- VPO1 – With point(s) scored by the opponent

Athlete	Event	Group stage			Final / RM	Rank
Athlete	Event	Opposition Score	Opposition Score	Rank	Opposition Score	Rank
Brandon Calle	Boys' Greco-Roman −71kg	Guţu (MDA); L 0 – 4 ^{VFA}	Maafi (TUN); L 8 – 8 ^{VPO1}	3 Q	Santos (GUM); W 14 – 6 ^{VSU1}	5
Diego Zuluaga	Boys' freestyle −48kg	Gegelashvili (GEO); L 1 – 12 ^{VSU1}	Detudamo (NRU); W 10 – 0 ^{VSU}	2 Q	Gökdeniz (TUR); L 0 – 4 ^{VFA}	4

== See also ==
- Colombia at the Youth Olympics
- Colombia at the 2019 Pan American Games
