= Tunisia at the 2018 Summer Youth Olympics =

- IOC code: TUN
- NOC: Tunisian Olympic Committee
- Website: http://www.cnot.org.tn/

in Buenos Aires, Argentina 6 – 18 October 2018
- Competitors: 38 in 15 sports
- Medals Ranked 52nd: Gold 1 Silver 1 Bronze 1 Total 3

Summer Youth Olympics appearances (overview)
- 2010; 2014; 2018; 2026

Tunisia participated at the 2018 Summer Youth Olympics in Buenos Aires, Argentina from 6 October to 18 October 2018.

== Athletics ==
Tunisia qualified four athletes.

Qualification Legend: Q=Final A (medal); qB=Final B (non-medal); qC=Final C (non-medal); qD=Final D (non-medal); qE=Final E (non-medal)

Boys
Track & road events

Athlete	Event	Heats		Final	
Athlete	Event	Result	Rank	Result	Rank
Rami Balti	400 m hurdles	56.03	15	54.59	10
Ahmed Sayf Kadri	2000 m steeplechase	5:44.56	2	12:15	8

Girls
Field Events

Athlete	Event	Qualification		Final	
Athlete	Event	Distance	Rank	Distance	Rank
Ghada Hamdani	Triple Jump	11.74	15	DNS	
Imen Rhouma	Pole Vault	3.35	12	3.22	15

== Boxing ==
Tunisia qualified one boxer based on its performance at the 2018 AIBA Youth African Championships

Girls

Athlete	Event	Preliminaries	Semifinals	Final / RM	Rank
Athlete	Event	Opposition Result	Opposition Result	Opposition Result	Rank
Mawada Taghouti	-60 kg	Dubois (GBR); L 0–5	did not advance		5

== Canoeing ==
Tunisia has qualified one boat for the following distances into the Olympic canoeing regatta through the 2018 youth olympic games canoeing world qualification event.

Boys

Athlete	Event	Qualification		Repechage		Quarterfinals	Semifinals	Final / BM	Rank
Athlete	Event	Time	Rank	Time	Rank	Opposition Result	Opposition Result	Opposition Result	Rank
Zaydene Ben Hassine	Boys’ K1 Sprint	1:50.95	11	DSQ		did not advance			
Zaydene Ben Hassine	Boys’ K1 Slalom	1:24.95	11	1:22.92	7	did not advance			

== Gymnastics ==
=== Rhythmic Gymnastics ===
Tunisia qualified one athlete based on its performance at the 2018 youth African Rhythmic gymnastics and trampoline Championships.

Individual

Athlete	Event	Qualification						Final					
Athlete	Event	Hoop	Ball	Clubs	Ribbon	Total	Rank	Hoop	Ball	Clubs	Ribbon	Total	Rank
Lina Wahada	Individual	7.300	9.050	7.700	6.300	30.350	36	did not advance					

=== Mixed multi-discipline team ===
Team

Team	Athlete	Acrobatic	Artistic	Rhythmic	Trampoline	Total points	Rank
Team Rosie MacLennan (Light Blue)	Noa Kazado Yakar (ISR); Yonatan Fridman (ISR)	9	—N/a			441	11
Team Rosie MacLennan (Light Blue)	Sam Dick (NZL)	—N/a	79	—N/a		441	11
Team Rosie MacLennan (Light Blue)	Gabriel Burtănete (ROU)	—N/a	14	—N/a		441	11
Team Rosie MacLennan (Light Blue)	Yin Dehang (CHN)	—N/a	32	—N/a		441	11
Team Rosie MacLennan (Light Blue)	Emma Spence (CAN)	—N/a	26	—N/a		441	11
Team Rosie MacLennan (Light Blue)	Nazlı Savranbaşı (TUR)	—N/a	57	—N/a		441	11
Team Rosie MacLennan (Light Blue)	Sofia Nair (ALG)	—N/a	22	—N/a		441	11
Team Rosie MacLennan (Light Blue)	Tia Sobhy (EGY)	—N/a		99	—N/a	441	11
Team Rosie MacLennan (Light Blue)	Azra Dewan (RSA)	—N/a		93	—N/a	441	11
Team Rosie MacLennan (Light Blue)	Lina Wahada (TUN)	—N/a		-	—N/a	441	11
Team Rosie MacLennan (Light Blue)	Benny Wizani (AUT)	—N/a			8	441	11
Team Rosie MacLennan (Light Blue)	Yuki Okuno (JPN)	—N/a			10	441	11

== Judo ==
Tunisia qualified two athletes based on its performance at the 2017 Cadet World Judo Championships.

Individual

Athlete	Event	Round of 32	Round of 16	Quarterfinals	Semifinals	Rep 1	Rep 2	Rep 3	Final / BM	Rank
Athlete	Event	Opposition Result	Opposition Result	Opposition Result	Opposition Result	Opposition Result	Opposition Result	Opposition Result	Opposition Result	Rank
Aleddine Ben Chalbi	Boys' −55 kg	Bye	Daniel Leutgeb (AUT); L 01s1-10	did not advance		Bye	Adrián Medero (PUR); W 11s1-00	Romain Valadier-Picard (FRA); L 00s2-01s2	did not advance	5
Mariem Khlifi	Girls' −63 kg	Bye	Bye	Saskia Brothers (AUS); W 10-00	Nikol Pencue (COL); W 01s1-00	Bye			Szofi Özbas (HUN); L 00s2-10s01	2nd place, silver medalist(s)

Team

Athletes	Event	Round of 16	Quarterfinals	Semifinals	Final	
Athletes	Event	Opposition Result	Opposition Result	Opposition Result	Opposition Result	Rank
Team Singapore; Ahad Al-Sagheer (YEM); Anastasia Balaban (UKR); Bryan Garboa (ECU); Sarah Kafufula (COD); Mariem Khlifi (TUN); Ahmed Mohamed Fahmy (EGY); Eduarda Rosa (BRA); Ilia Sulamanidze (GEO)	Mixed team	Team Moscow (MIX); L 3–4	did not advance			

== Rowing ==
Athlete	Event	Heats		Repechage		Semifinals		Final		Overall Rank
Athlete	Event	Time	Rank	Time	Rank	Time	Rank	Time	Rank	Overall Rank
Dhiaeddine Zoghlami	Boys' Single Sculls									
Sara Zammali	Girls' Single Sculls									

== Rugby sevens ==
=== Girls' tournament ===
Roster

- Chaima Arbi
- Sabrine Barhoumi
- Amna Ben Arous
- Halima Ben Charrada
- Abir Dhahri
- Nesrine Faidi
- Jihen Fatnassi
- Khouloud Hammami
- Maissa Haouani
- Lamia Mlawah
- Hajer Saoudi
- Amna Zarrai

Group stage

Pos	Team	Pld	W	D	L	PF	PA	PD	Pts
1	New Zealand	5	5	0	0	169	27	+142	15
2	France	5	4	0	1	178	45	+133	13
3	Canada	5	3	0	2	125	85	+40	11
4	Colombia	5	2	0	3	66	119	−53	9
5	Kazakhstan	5	1	0	4	44	142	−98	7
6	Tunisia	5	0	0	5	19	183	−164	5

Source: Buenos Aires 2018
Rules for classification: 1) Points; 2) Head-to-head result; 3) Point difference; 4) Points scored.

13 October 2018
12:00

New Zealand	53–0	Tunisia
Try: Davison 0'c Pouri-Lane 3'm Maaka 5'm Tairakena 7'm Hohaia (2) 7'c, 10'c Paul 9'm Takitimu-Cook 12'c Tauranga 13'm Con: Pouri-Lane (2/6) 1', 8'; Takitimu-Cook (2/4) 11', 12'	Report

Club Atlético San Isidro, Buenos Aires
Referee: Maddy Putz (Australia)

13 October 2018
15:55

Canada	50–7	Tunisia
Try: Cousineau (3) 0'c, 7'm, 8'm Grant (2) 3'c, 5'c de Couvreur 7'c Mackinnon 13'm Izyk 14'c Con: Black (3/3) 1', 3', 5'; Czeppel (2/5) 7', 14'	Report	Try: Arbi 12'c Con: Ben Charrada (1/1) 12'

Club Atlético San Isidro, Buenos Aires
Referee: Ashleigh Murray (South Africa)

14 October 2018
12:50

Tunisia	5–24	Kazakhstan
Try: Barhoumi 14'm Con: Barhoumi (0/1)	Report	Try: Odnoletok (3) 0'c, 4'c, 11'm Boichenko 13'm Con: Kamenkova (2/3) 0', 4'; Mikhailenko (0/1)

Club Atlético San Isidro, Buenos Aires
Referee: Katherine Ritchie (Great Britain)

14 October 2018
15:30

France	41–0	Tunisia
Try: Noel (3) 2'm, 5'c, 13'm Muller 7'c Plantefeve 10'm Hapulat (2) 12'm, 14'c Con: Maran (3/7) 5', 7', 14'	Report

Club Atlético San Isidro, Buenos Aires
Referee: Lauren Jenner (New Zealand)

15 October 2018
10:40

Colombia	15–7	Tunisia
Try: Mejia 7'm Sarmeinto 10'm Ramirez 12'm Con: Tapias (0/3)	Report	Try: Arbi 14'c Con: Ben Arous (1/1) 14'

Club Atlético San Isidro, Buenos Aires
Referee: Lauren Jenner (New Zealand)

== Sailing ==
Tunisia qualified one boat based on its performance at the African Nacra 15 Qualifiers.

Mixed

Athlete	Event	Race													Net points	Final rank
Athlete	Event	1	2	3	4	5	6	7	8	9	10	11	12	M*	Net points	Final rank
Fourat Gueddana; Chaima Chemmeri	Nacra 15	(15)	7	12	13	14	(15)	13	12	12	12	14	14	14	167.0	14

== Shooting ==
Tunisia qualified one sport shooter based on its performance at the 2017 African Championships.

Women

Athlete	Event	Qualification		Final	
Athlete	Event	Points	Rank	Points	Rank
Douaa Chalghoum	Girls' 10 m air pistol	537-8	19	did not advance	

Mixed

Athlete	Event	Qualification		Round of 16	Quarterfinal	Semifinal	Final	
Athlete	Event	Points	Rank	Opposition Score	Opposition Score	Opposition Score	Opposition Score	Rank
Doua Chalghoum (TUN); Sung Yun-ho (KOR)	Mixed 10 metre air pistol	720-7	20	did not advance				

== Swimming ==
Tunisia qualified four swimmers.

Boys

Athlete	Event	Heat		Semifinal		Final	
Athlete	Event	Time	Rank	Time	Rank	Time	Rank
Azziz Ghaffari	100 m freestyle						
Azziz Ghaffari	200 m freestyle						
Azziz Ghaffari	400 m freestyle						
Ahmed Hafnaoui	200 m freestyle						
Ahmed Hafnaoui	400 m freestyle						
Ahmed Hafnaoui	800 m freestyle						

== Table tennis ==
Tunisia qualified one table tennis player based on its performance at the African Continental Qualifier.

Singles

Athlete	Event	Group Stage	Rank	Round of 16	Quarterfinals	Semifinals	Final / BM	Rank
Athlete	Event	Opposition Score	Rank	Opposition Score	Opposition Score	Opposition Score	Opposition Score	Rank
Nathael Elyes Hamdoun	Boys							

== Taekwondo ==
Athlete	Event	Round of 16	Quarterfinals	Semifinals	Final / BM	
Athlete	Event	Opposition Result	Opposition Result	Opposition Result	Opposition Result	Rank
Mohamed Khalil Jendoubi	Boys' 48 kg	Bye	Sharif Salim (USA); W 11-8	Dmitrii Shishko (RUS); L 10-14	did not advance	3rd place, bronze medalist(s)
Asma Hajji	Girls' 63 kg	Sara Neto (STP); W 21-0	Assunta Cennamo (ITA); L 8-11	did not advance		

== Triathlon ==
Tunisia qualified two athlete based on its performance at the 2018 African Cadet and junior Championships.

Individual

Athlete	Event	Swim (750m)	Trans 1	Bike (20 km)	Trans 2	Run (5 km)	Total Time	Rank
Mohamed Aziz Sebai	Boys	10:42	0:28	29:24	0:29	17:51	58:54	25
Sirine Fattoum	Girls	10:52	0:54	32:52	0:32	21:01	1:06:11	28

Relay

Athlete	Event	Total Times per Athlete (Swim 250m, Bike 6.6 km, Run 1.8 km)	Total Group Time	Rank
Africa 1 Amber Schlebusch (RSA); Christiaan Stroebel (RSA); Syrine Fattoum (TUN); Mohamed Aziz Sebai (TUN)	Mixed Relay	22:01 (2); 21:17 (5); 25:27 (12); 23:09 (9)	1:31:54 1P	9

== Weightlifting ==
Tunisia qualified one athlete based on its performance at the 2018 African Cadet Championships

Girls

Athlete	Event	Snatch		Clean & jerk		Total	Rank
Athlete	Event	Result	Rank	Result	Rank	Total	Rank
Ghofrane Belkhir	−58 kg	88	1	108	1	196	1st place, gold medalist(s)

== Wrestling ==
Tunisia qualified three athletes based on its performance at the 2018 African Cadet Championships.

Key:

- VFA – Victory by Fall.
- VSU – Without any points scored by the opponent
- VSU1 – With point(s) scored by the opponent
- VPO – Without any points scored by the opponent
- VPO1 – With point(s) scored by the opponent

Boys

Athlete	Event	Group stage			Final / RM	Rank
Athlete	Event	Opposition Score	Opposition Score	Rank	Opposition Score	Rank
Mehdi Jouini	Greco-Roman −51kg	Sasaki (JPN); L 0 – 9 ^{VSU}	Salas (MEX); L 8 – 10 ^{VPO1}	3 Q	Adiniwin (MHL); W 2 – 0 ^{VFA}	5
Lamjed Maafi	Greco-Roman −71kg	Guţu (MDA); L 0 – 9 ^{VSU}	Calle (COL); W 8 – 8 ^{VPO1}	2 Q	Yamada (JPN); L 0 – 4 ^{VPO}	4

Girls

Athlete	Event	Group stage					Final / RM	Rank
Athlete	Event	Opposition Score	Opposition Score	Opposition Score	Opposition Score	Rank	Opposition Score	Rank
Zaineb Sghaier	Freestyle −65kg	Vesso (EST); L 1 – 7 ^{VFA}	Nabaina (CMR); W 10 – 6 ^{VFA}	Chudyk (UKR); L 0 – 10 ^{VSU}	Balogun (NGR); L 0 – 9 ^{VPO}	4 Q	Ramírez (CUB); W 1 – 1 ^{VPO1}	7
Khadija Jlassi	Freestyle −73kg	Dzibuk (BLR); L 4 – 13 ^{VPO1}	Gök (TUR); W 6 – 1 ^{VFA}	Oknazarova (UZB); L 2 – 13 ^{VSU1}	Machuca (ARG); L 2 – 5 ^{VPO1}	4 Q	White (CAN); W 4 – 0 ^{VFA}	7
