= New Zealand at the 2018 Summer Youth Olympics =

- IOC code: NZL
- NOC: New Zealand Olympic Committee
- Website: http://www.olympic.org.nz/

in Buenos Aires, Argentina 6 – 18 October 2018
- Competitors: 61 in 22 sports
- Flag bearer: Kanah Andrews-Nahu
- Medals Ranked 25th: Gold 3 Silver 1 Bronze 1 Total 5

Summer Youth Olympics appearances
- 2010; 2014; 2018; 2026

New Zealand participated at the 2018 Summer Youth Olympics in Buenos Aires, Argentina, from 6 October to 18 October 2018.

== Archery ==
Individual

Athlete	Event	Ranking round		Round of 32	Round of 16	Quarterfinals	Semifinals	Final / BM	Rank
Athlete	Event	Score	Seed	Opposition Score	Opposition Score	Opposition Score	Opposition Score	Opposition Score	Rank
Rebecca Jones	Girls' Individual	587	31	Uehara (JPN); W 6–5	Reddig (NAM); W 7–3	Vázquez Cadena (MEX); L 0–6	did not advance		7

Team

Athletes	Event	Ranking round		Round of 32	Round of 16	Quarterfinals	Semifinals	Final / BM	Rank
Athletes	Event	Score	Seed	Opposition Score	Opposition Score	Opposition Score	Opposition Score	Opposition Score	Rank
Rebecca Jones (NZL); Tang Chih-chun (TPE)	Mixed team	1276	28	Reisenweber (GER); Fabrizzi (ITA); W 6–2	Hnin (MYA); Ak (TUR); W 5–1	Tagle (PHI); Õun (EST); W 5–1	Giannasio (ARG); Soithong (THA); L 0–6	Reddig (NAM); Cowles (USA); L 3–5	4

== Badminton ==
New Zealand qualified one player based on the Badminton Junior World Rankings.

Singles

Athlete	Event	Group stage				Quarterfinal	Semifinal	Final / BM	Rank
Athlete	Event	Opposition Score	Opposition Score	Opposition Score	Rank	Opposition Score	Opposition Score	Opposition Score	Rank
Oscar Guo	Boys' Singles	Grimley (GBR); L 0–2	Papai (HUN); W 2–0	Chen (TPE); L 0–2	3	did not advance			9

Team

Athlete	Event	Group stage				Quarterfinal	Semifinal	Final / BM	Rank
Athlete	Event	Opposition Score	Opposition Score	Opposition Score	Rank	Opposition Score	Opposition Score	Opposition Score	Rank
Team Omega; Oscar Guo (NZL); Markus Barth (NOR); Chang Ho Kim (FIJ); Kunlavut Vitidsarn (THA); Huang Yin-hsuan (TPE); Léonice Huet (FRA); Anastasiya Prozorova (UKR); Vũ Thị Anh Thư (VIE)	Mixed Teams	Gamma (MIX); W (110–99)	Theta (MIX); W (110–100)	Sigma (MIX); W (110–98)	1Q	Epsilon (MIX); W (110–102)	Zeta (MIX); W (110–109)	Alpha (MIX); L (106–110)	2nd place, silver medalist(s)

== Basketball ==
New Zealand qualified a boys' team based on the U18 3x3 National Federation Ranking.

- Boys' tournament – 1 team of 4 athletes

Event	Group stage					Quarterfinal	Semifinal	Final / BM	
Event	Opposition Score	Opposition Score	Opposition Score	Opposition Score	Rank	Opposition Score	Opposition Score	Opposition Score	Rank
Boys' tournament	Andorra; W 11–16	Ukraine; L 13–21	Venezuela; W 21–16	Brazil; L 17–20	3	did not advance			

== Beach volleyball ==
New Zealand qualified a boys' and girls' team based on their performance at the 2018 Oceania U19 Championship.

- Boys' tournament – 1 team of 2 athletes
- Girls' tournament – 1 team of 2 athletes

Athletes	Event	Preliminary round		Round of 24	Round of 16	Quarterfinals	Semifinals	Final / BM	
Athletes	Event	Opposition Score	Rank	Opposition Score	Opposition Score	Opposition Score	Opposition Score	Opposition Score	Rank
David Jeffrey–Keegan Joe	Boys'	Veretiuk–Shekunov (RUS); L0–2; Poznański–Miszczuk (POL); L0–2; Lammel–Droguett (CHI); L0–2	4	did not advance					
Maya Dickson–Tamara Otene	Girls'	Nicole–Canedo (BOL); L 1–2 van Driel–Schoon (NED); L 1–2; Dorcas–Kutekenenyi (COD); W 2–0	3	Thatsarida–Pawarun (THA); L 0–2	did not advance				

== Boxing ==
Boys

Athlete	Event	Preliminary R1	Preliminary R2	Semifinals	Final / RM	Rank
Athlete	Event	Opposition Result	Opposition Result	Opposition Result	Opposition Result	Rank
Kasib Hunter Murdoch-McKeich	-60 kg	Bondarchuk (UKR); L 0–5	Mamdouh (EGY); L 0–5	Did not advance	Wilcox (CAN); L 0–5	6

Girls

Athlete	Event	Preliminaries	Semifinals	Final / RM	Rank
Athlete	Event	Opposition Result	Opposition Result	Opposition Result	Rank
Te Mania Rzeka Tai Shelford-Edmonds	-57 kg	Bye	Carrillo Carrillo (MEX); L RSC R2 0:48	Rooney (IRL); L 0–5	4

== Canoeing ==
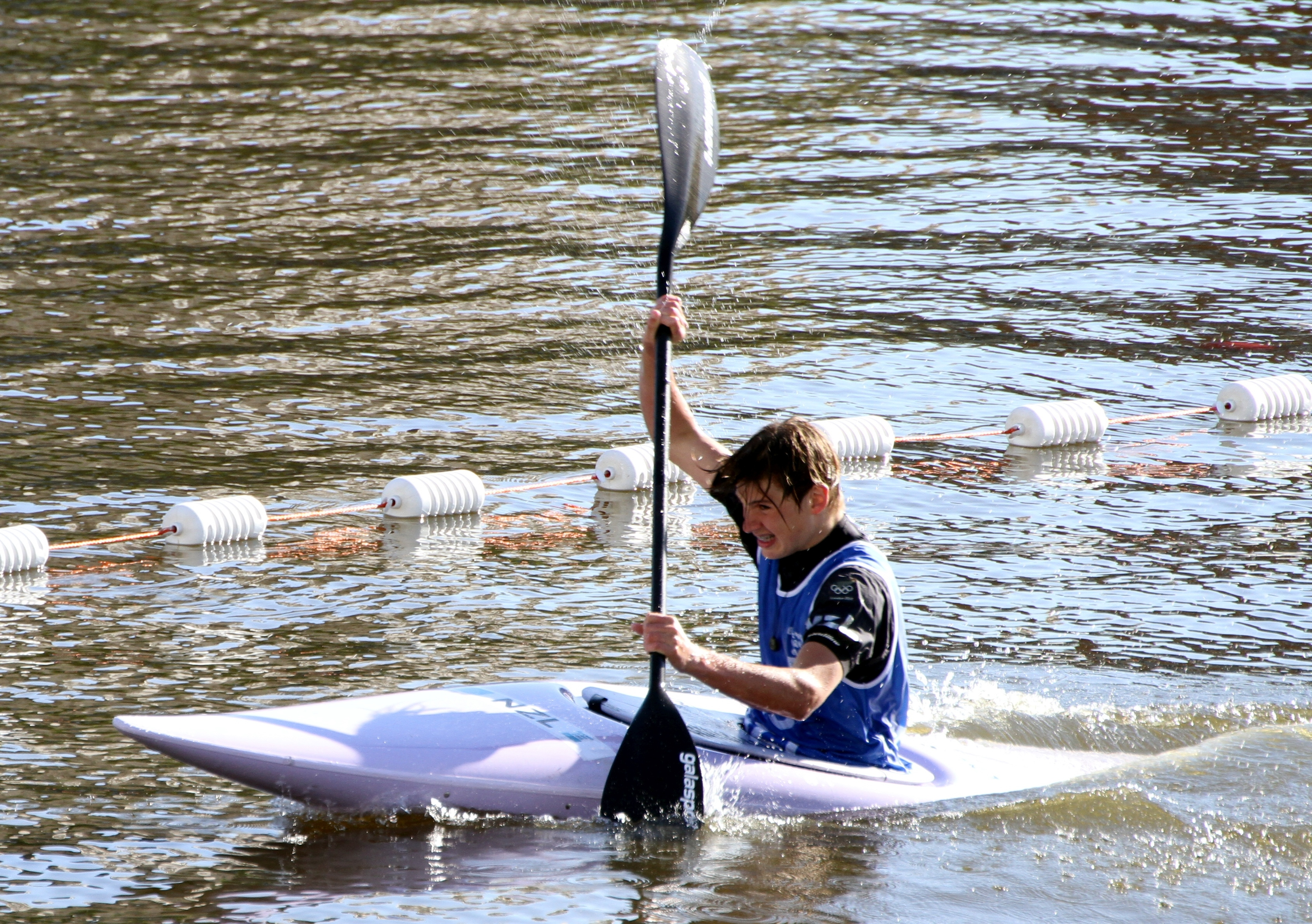
George Snook at Boys' K1 slalom Bronze Medal Race

New Zealand qualified three boats based on its performance at the 2018 World Qualification Event.

- Boys' C1 – Finn Anderson
- Boys' K1 – George Snook
- Girls' C1 – Kahlia Cullwick

Athlete	Event	Qualification		Repechage		Round of 16	Quarterfinals	Semifinals	Final / BM	Rank
Athlete	Event	Time	Rank	Time	Rank	Opposition Result	Opposition Result	Opposition Result	Opposition Result	Rank
Finn Anderson	Boys' C1 sprint	2:34.80	16	2:30.15	12	—N/a	did not advance			
Finn Anderson	Boys' C1 slalom	1:20.26	2	Bye		—N/a	Bechtold (GER); W 1:24.44	Kuzyk (UKR); W 1:20.57	Saramandif (MRI); L 1:23.26	2nd place, silver medalist(s)
George Snook	Boys' K1 sprint	1:59.00	13	2:00.50	8	—N/a	did not advance			
George Snook	Boys' K1 slalom	1:14.33	3	Bye		—N/a	Kiss (HUN); W 1:13.35	Changheng (CHN); L 1:16.27	Bouchardon (FRA); L 1:16.81	4
Kahlia Cullwick	Girls' C1 sprint	2:56.39	14	3:37.85	5	Nurlanova (KAZ); L 3:10.30	did not advance			
Kahlia Cullwick	Girls' C1 slalom	1:34.17	7	Bye		Rodríguez (MEX); W 1:39.06	Asadbeki (IRI); L 1:37.84	did not advance		

== Cycling ==
New Zealand qualified a boys' and girls' combined team based on its ranking in the Youth Olympic Games Junior Nation Rankings. The also qualified a mixed BMX racing team based on its ranking in the Youth Olympic Games BMX Junior Nation Rankings.

- Boys' combined team – 1 team of 2 athletes
- Girls' combined team – 1 team of 2 athletes: Sammie Maxwell and Phoebe Young
- Mixed BMX racing team – 1 team of 2 athletes

== Equestrian ==
New Zealand qualified a rider based on its ranking in the FEI World Jumping Challenge Rankings.

- Individual Jumping – Briar Burnett-Grant

Summary

Athlete	Horse	Event	Qualification					Final					Total	
Athlete	Horse	Event	Round 1		Round 2			Round A		Round B			Total	
Athlete	Horse	Event	Penalties	Rank	Penalties	Total	Rank	Penalties	Rank	Penalties	Total	Rank	Penalties	Rank
Briar Burnett-Grant	Milagro Maximo	Individual	—N/a					0	=1 Q	4	4	6	4	6
Mix Australasia; Almarzooqi (UAE); Najafinia (IRI); Burnett-Grant (NZL); Alqashouti (QAT); Sinderberry (AUS)	La Corina Lala; La Trinidad; Milagro Maximo; Pietro; Zambo	Team	24	=1 Q	36	60	5	—N/a					60	4

== Golf ==
Individual

Athlete	Event	Round 1		Round 2			Round 3			Total		
Athlete	Event	Score	Rank	Score	Total	Rank	Score	Total	Rank	Score	Par	Rank
Juliana Hung	Girls' Individual	77 (+7)	15	77 (+7)	154	19	77 (+7)	231	24	231	+21	20
Jimmy Zheng	Boys' Individual	73 (+3)	12	75 (+5)	148	17	81 (+11)	229	26	229	+19	24

Team

Athletes	Event	Round 1 (Fourball)		Round 2 (Foursome)		Round 3 (Individual Stroke)				Total		
Athletes	Event	Score	Rank	Score	Rank	Girl	Boy	Total	Rank	Score	Par	Rank
Juliana Hung; Jimmy Zheng	Mixed team	69 (−1)	27	79 (+9)	25	77	73	150 (+10)	22	298	+18	26

== Gymnastics ==
=== Artistic ===
New Zealand qualified one gymnast based on its performance at the 2018 Oceania Junior Championship.

- Boys' artistic individual all-around – 1 quota

== Judo ==
Individual

Athlete	Event	Round of 16	Quarterfinals	Semifinals	Repechage		Final / BM	Rank
Athlete	Event	Round of 16	Quarterfinals	Semifinals	Quarterfinals	Semifinals	Final / BM	Rank
Athlete	Event	Opposition Result	Opposition Result	Opposition Result	Opposition Result	Opposition Result	Opposition Result	Rank
Rihari Iki	Boys' −81 kg	Adrian Sulca (ROU); L 00–10	did not advance		Alexis Harrison (PAN); W 10–00	Mark van Dijk (NED); L 00–10	did not advance	5

Team

Athletes	Event	Round of 16	Quarterfinals	Semifinals	Final	Rank
Athletes	Event	Opposition Result	Opposition Result	Opposition Result	Opposition Result	Rank
Team Nanjing; Hasret Bozkurt (TUR); Joaquín Burgos (ARG); Nilufar Ermaganbetova (UZB); Rihari Iki (NZL); Alaa Mousaad Mohamed (EGY); Eva Pérez Soler (ESP); Vugar Talibov (AZE); Romain Valadier-Picard (FRA)	Mixed Team	—N/a	Team Beijing (MIX); L 3–4	did not advance		

== Karate ==
- Boys' +68 kg – Raukawa Jefferies

Athlete	Event	Group Stage				Semifinal	Final / BM	
Athlete	Event	Opposition Score	Opposition Score	Opposition Score	Rank	Opposition Score	Opposition Score	Rank
Raukawa Jefferies	Boys' +68 kg	Robert Avakimov (RUS); L (1–4)	Enes Bulut (TUR); L (0–1)	Nabil Ech-Chaabi (MAR); D (0–0)	4	did not advance		

== Rugby sevens ==
New Zealand qualified a girls' team based on its performance at the Oceania Rugby U18s Sevens Championship.

=== Girls' tournament ===
Roster

- Tiana Davison
- Dhys Faleafaga
- Tynealle Fitzgerald
- Iritana Hohaia
- Jazmin Hotham
- Ricshay Lemanu
- Azalleyah Maaka
- Risaleaana Pouri-Lane
- Montessa Tairakena
- Kalyn Takitimu-Cook
- Arorangi Tauranga
- Hinemoa Watene

Pos	Team	Pld	W	D	L	PF	PA	PD	Pts
1	New Zealand	5	5	0	0	169	27	+142	15
2	France	5	4	0	1	178	45	+133	13
3	Canada	5	3	0	2	125	85	+40	11
4	Colombia	5	2	0	3	66	119	−53	9
5	Kazakhstan	5	1	0	4	44	142	−98	7
6	Tunisia	5	0	0	5	19	183	−164	5

Source: Buenos Aires 2018
Rules for classification: 1) Points; 2) Head-to-head result; 3) Point difference; 4) Points scored.

13 October 2018
12:00

New Zealand	53–0	Tunisia
Try: Davison 0'c Pouri-Lane 3'm Maaka 5'm Tairakena 7'm Hohaia (2) 7'c, 10'c Paul 9'm Takitimu-Cook 12'c Tauranga 13'm Con: Pouri-Lane (2/6) 1', 8'; Takitimu-Cook (2/4) 11', 12'	Report

Club Atlético San Isidro, Buenos Aires
Referee: Maddy Putz (Australia)

13 October 2018
15:05

New Zealand	38–5	Colombia
Try: Hohaia 0'c Dallinger 2'c Pouri-Lane 5'c Takitimu-Cook 8'c Tairakena 10'm Fitzgerald 14'm Con: Pouri-Lane (4/5) 1', 3', 6', 9'; Dallinger (0/1)	Report	Try: Mejia 12'm Con: Ibarra (0/1)

Club Atlético San Isidro, Buenos Aires
Referee: Katherine Ritchie (Great Britain)

14 October 2018
12:00

New Zealand	26–12	France
Try: Watene 4'c Tairakena (2) 6'm, 8'c Pouri-Lane 11'c Con: Pouri-Lane (3/4) 4', 9', 11'	Report	Try: Berthoumieu 2'm Muller 13'c Con: Christiaens (1/1) 13'; Maran (0/1)

Club Atlético San Isidro, Buenos Aires
Referee: Ashleigh Murray (South Africa)

14 October 2018
15:05

New Zealand	20–5	Canada
Try: Maaka 7'm Tairakena (2) 10'm, 12'm Risaleaana Pouri-Lane 13'm Con: Risaleaana Pouri-Lane (0/4)	Report	Try: Wardley 4'm Con: Black (0/1)

Club Atlético San Isidro, Buenos Aires
Referee: Katherine Ritchie (Great Britain)

15 October 2018
9:50

New Zealand	32–5	Kazakhstan
Try: Takitimu-Cook 6'm Tairakena 8'm Watene 10'c Dallinger 11'm Tahere (2) 12'm, 14'm Con: Pouri-Lane (1/6) 10'	Report	Try: Odnoletok 0'm Con: Mikhailenko (0/1)

Club Atlético San Isidro, Buenos Aires
Referee: Katherine Ritchie (Great Britain)

Gold Medal Game

15 October 2018
15:35

(gold) New Zealand	15–12	France (silver)
Try: Tairakena 0'm Hohaia 4'm Mahina 11'm Con: Pouri-Lane (0/3)	Report	Try: Christiaens 6'c Hapulat 9'm Con: Christiaens (1/2) 7'

Club Atlético San Isidro, Buenos Aires
Referee: Ashleigh Murray (South Africa)

== Sailing ==
New Zealand qualified two boats based on its performance at the Oceania Techno 293+ Youth Olympic Games Qualifier. They also qualified one boat based on its performance at the Asian and Oceania IKA Twin Tip Racing Qualifiers.

- Boys' Techno 293+ – 1 boat
- Girls' Techno 293+ – 1 boat
- Girls' IKA Twin Tip Racing – 1 boat

== Sport climbing ==
New Zealand qualified one sport climber based on its performance at the 2017 Oceania Youth Sport Climbing Championships.

- Girls' combined – 1 quota (Sarah Tetzlaff)

== Table tennis ==
New Zealand qualified two table tennis players based on its performance at the Oceania Continental Qualifier.

- Boys' singles – Nathan Xu
- Girls' singles – Hui Ling Vong

== Tennis ==
Singles

Athlete	Event	Round of 32	Round of 16	Quarterfinals	Semifinals	Final / BM	Rank
Athlete	Event	Opposition Score	Opposition Score	Opposition Score	Opposition Score	Opposition Score	Rank
Valentina Ivanov	Girls' Singles	G Drummy (IRL); L (0–6, 7–5, 3–6)	did not advance				

Doubles

Athletes	Event	Round of 32	Round of 16	Quarterfinals	Semifinals	Final / BM	Rank
Athletes	Event	Opposition Score	Opposition Score	Opposition Score	Opposition Score	Opposition Score	Rank
Thasaporn Naklo (THA); Valentina Ivanov (NZL)	Girls' Doubles	Bilokin (UKR); Dema (UKR); L (1–6, 3–6)	did not advance				9

== Triathlon ==
New Zealand qualified two athletes based on its performance at the 2018 Oceania Youth Olympic Games Qualifier.

Individual

Athlete	Event	Swim (750m)	Trans 1	Bike (20 km)	Trans 2	Run (5 km)	Total Time	Rank
Dylan McCullough	Boys	9:29	0:28	26:52	0:28	16:10	53:27	1st place, gold medalist(s)
Brea Roderick	Girls	10:12	0:39	30:10	0:28	19:26	1:00:55	9

Relay

Athlete	Event	Total Times per Athlete (Swim 250m, Bike 6.6 km, Run 1.8 km)	Total Group Time	Rank
Oceania 1 Charlotte Derbyshire (AUS); Dylan McCullough (NZL); Brea Roderick (NZL); Joshua Ferris (AUS)	Mixed Relay	22:26 (5); 19:51 (1); 23:00 (2); 21:15 (2)	1:26:32	2nd place, silver medalist(s)

== Weightlifting ==
Athlete	Event	Snatch		Clean & jerk		Total	Rank
Athlete	Event	Result	Rank	Result	Rank	Total	Rank
Kanah Andrews-Nahu	Girls' +63 kg	95	2	116	4	211	3rd place, bronze medalist(s)

- Supatchanin Khamhaeng from Thailand was disqualified after testing positive for a banned substance. She was stripped of her gold medal and Kanah Andrews-Nahu got the bronze medal.

== Wrestling ==
New Zealand qualified four wrestlers based on its performance at the 2018 Oceania Cadet Championship.

Key:
- VFA – Victory by Fall
- VSU – Without any points scored by the opponent
- VSU1 – With point(s) scored by the opponent
- VPO – Without any points scored by the opponent
- VPO1 – With point(s) scored by the opponent

Athlete	Event	Group stage					Final / RM	Rank
Athlete	Event	Opposition Score	Opposition Score	Opposition Score	Opposition Score	Rank	Opposition Score	Rank
Arapo Kellner	Boys' Greco-Roman −60kg	Sadyrov (KGZ); L 0 – 9 ^{VSU}	Ugalde (MEX); L 0 – 8 ^{VSU}	—N/a		3 Q	Merikhi (ALG); L 2 – 10 ^{VSU1}	6
Westerly Ainsley	Boys' freestyle −65kg	Ullah (PAK); L 2 – 13 ^{VSU1}	Bayramov (AZE); L 0 – 10 ^{VSU}	—N/a		3 Q	Ismail (EGY); L 0 – 7 ^{VPO}	6
Ryan Marshall	Boys' freestyle −80kg	Tembotov (RUS); L 0 – 10 ^{VSU}	Rakhimov (UZB); L 0 – 10 ^{VSU}	—N/a		3 Q	Yairegpie (FSM); W 4 – 0 ^{VFA}	5
Ella Derry	Girls' freestyle −43kg	Leorda (MDA); L WO	Simran (IND); L WO	Mahmoud (EGY); L WO	Batbaatar (MGL); L WO	5 Q	Ogunsanya (NGR); L WO	10
