= Kazakhstan at the 2018 Summer Youth Olympics =

- IOC code: KAZ
- NOC: National Olympic Committee of the Republic of Kazakhstan
- Website: http://www.olympic.kz/

in Buenos Aires, Argentina 6 – 18 October 2018
- Competitors: 58 in 20 sports
- Medals Ranked 14th: Gold 4 Silver 3 Bronze 3 Total 10

Summer Youth Olympics appearances (overview)
- 2010; 2014; 2018

Kazakhstan participated at the 2018 Summer Youth Olympics in Buenos Aires, Argentina from 6 October to 18 October 2018.

== Competitors ==
Sport	Girls	Boys	Total
Archery	1	1	2
Athletics	4	1	5
Badminton	0	1	1
Basketball	0	4	4
Boxing	2	3	5
Canoeing	2	2	4
Cycling	2	2	4
Diving	1	0	1
Fencing	1	0	1
Gymnastics	3	2	5
Judo	1	1	2
Karate	0	1	1
Modern Pentathlon	1	1	2
Rugby Sevens	11	0	11
Shooting	0	1	1
Swimming	2	2	4
Taekwondo	2	0	2
Tennis	0	1	1
Triathlon	0	1	1
Wrestling	1	0	1
Total	34	24	58

== Archery ==
Kazakhstan qualified one female archer based on its performance at the 2017 World Archery Youth Championships. Later, they qualified one male archer based on its performance at the Asian Continental Qualification Tournament.

Individual

Athlete	Event	Ranking round		Round of 32	Round of 16	Quarterfinals	Semifinals	Final / BM	Rank
Athlete	Event	Score	Seed	Opposition Score	Opposition Score	Opposition Score	Opposition Score	Opposition Score	Rank
Alikhan Mustafin	Boys' Individual	646	26	Cheremiskin (RUS); L 2–6	did not advance				17
Alexandra Voropayeva	Girls' Individual	637	17	Gațco (MDA); W 6–4	Zhang (CHN); L 1–7	did not advance			9

Team

Athletes	Event	Ranking round		Round of 32	Round of 16	Quarterfinals	Semifinals	Final / BM	Rank
Athletes	Event	Score	Seed	Opposition Score	Opposition Score	Opposition Score	Opposition Score	Opposition Score	Rank
Alikhan Mustafin (KAZ); Valentina Vázquez Cadena (MEX)	Mixed team	1305	2	Shapla (BAN); Song (KOR); W 6–2	Reddig (NAM); Cowles (USA); L 2–6	did not advance			9
Alexandra Voropayeva (KAZ); Alejandro Benítez (PAR)	Mixed team	1300	15	Reddig (NAM); Cowles (USA); L 0–6	did not advance				17

== Athletics ==
Athlete	Event	Stage 1		Stage 2		Total	
Athlete	Event	Result	Rank	Result	Rank	Total	Rank
Yefim Tarassov	Boys' 400 metres	48.93	7	49.88	12	1:38.81	10
Alexandra Zalyubovskaya	Girls' 400 metres	57.21	12	58.55	17	1:55.76	16
Galina Panassenko	Girls' 2000 metre steeplechase	DNF		DNS		—N/a	
Kristina Morozova	Girls' 5000 metre walk	25:11.17	10	27:15.83	15	52:27.00	14
Anastassiya Glukhareva	Girls' triple jump	12.02	13	12.49	7	24.51	12

== Badminton ==
Kazakhstan qualified one player based on the Badminton Junior World Rankings.

Singles

Athlete	Event	Group stage				Quarterfinal	Semifinal	Final / BM	Rank
Athlete	Event	Opposition Score	Opposition Score	Opposition Score	Rank	Opposition Score	Opposition Score	Opposition Score	Rank
Dmitriy Panarin	Boys' Singles	Savin (MDA); W 2–1	Kim (FIJ); W 2–0	Naraoka (JPN); L 0–2	2	did not advance			9

Team

Athlete	Event	Group stage				Quarterfinal	Semifinal	Final / BM	Rank
Athlete	Event	Opposition Score	Opposition Score	Opposition Score	Rank	Opposition Score	Opposition Score	Opposition Score	Rank
Team Delta; Dmitriy Panarin (KAZ); Mateo Delmastro (ARG); Arnaud Merklé (FRA); Balázs Pápai (HUN); Elena Andreu (ESP); Pattarasuda Chaiwan (THA); Madouc Linders (NED); Petra Polanc (SLO)	Mixed Teams	Zeta (MIX); W (110–95)	Alpha (MIX); W (110–99)	Epsilon (MIX); L (108–110)	1Q	Theta (MIX); L (93–110)	did not advance		5

== Basketball ==
Kazakhstan qualified a boys' team based on the U18 3x3 National Federation Ranking.

- Boys' tournament – 1 team of 4 athletes

Event	Group stage					Quarterfinal	Semifinal	Final / BM	
Event	Opposition Score	Opposition Score	Opposition Score	Opposition Score	Rank	Opposition Score	Opposition Score	Opposition Score	Rank
Boys' tournament	Belgium; L 9–20	Italy; L 12–21	Latvia; L 16–19	Kyrgyzstan; W 21–13	4	did not advance			

== Boxing ==
Boys

Athlete	Event	Preliminary R1	Preliminary R2	Semifinals	Final / RM	Rank
Athlete	Event	Opposition Result	Opposition Result	Opposition Result	Opposition Result	Rank
Talgat Shaiken	-64 kg	Bye	Maliqi (KOS); W WO	Boulaouja (MAR); W RSC R3 2:19	Popov (RUS); L 1–4	2nd place, silver medalist(s)
Aibek Oralbay	-91 kg	Bye	Salgado (CHI); W 5–0	Canales (PUR); W 5–0	Hacid (ALG); W 5–0	1st place, gold medalist(s)
Damir Toibay	+91 kg	Bye	Tuigamala (SAM); W WO	Chuol (CAN); W 5–0	Dronov (RUS); L 1–4	2nd place, silver medalist(s)

Girls

Athlete	Event	Preliminaries	Semifinals	Final / RM	Rank
Athlete	Event	Opposition Result	Opposition Result	Opposition Result	Rank
Zhansaya Abdraimova	-51 kg	Garcia (USA); L 2–3	did not advance		5
Nadezhda Ryabets	-75 kg	Gajewska (POL); W 5–0	Shamonova (RUS); L 0–5	Chaib (ALG); W 5–0	3rd place, bronze medalist(s)

== Canoeing ==
Kazakhstan qualified four boats based on its performance at the 2018 World Qualification Event.

- Boys' C1 – 1 boat
- Boys' K1 – 1 boat
- Girls' C1 – 1 boat
- Girls' K1 – 1 boat

Athlete	Event	Qualification		Repechage		Round of 16	Quarterfinals	Semifinals	Final / BM	Rank
Athlete	Event	Time	Rank	Time	Rank	Opposition Result	Opposition Result	Opposition Result	Opposition Result	Rank
Dias Bakhraddin	Boys' C1 sprint	1:54.08	2	Bye		—N/a	Kuzyk (UKR); W 1:54.64	Palla (HUN); W 1:54.66	Abdusalomov (UZB); W 1:54.66	1st place, gold medalist(s)
Dias Bakhraddin	Boys' C1 slalom	1:23.85	5	1:23.98	1	—N/a	Saramandif (MRI); L 1:24.28	did not advance		
Mikhail Yakovlev	Boys' K1 sprint	1:44.90	6	1:46.19	4	—N/a	Pilarz (POL); L 1:45.40	did not advance		
Mikhail Yakovlev	Boys' K1 slalom	1:16.90	6	1:17.38	5	—N/a	did not advance			
Elnura Nurlanova	Girls' C1 sprint	2:19.48	5	Bye		Cullwick (NZL); W 2:19.58	Asadbeki (IRI); W 2:20.95	Fayzieva (UZB); L 2:22.61	Guzmán (MEX); L 2:22.19	4
Elnura Nurlanova	Girls' C1 slalom	1:32.62	6	Bye		Arias (CHI); W 1:34.57	Luknárová (SVK); L 1:32.67	did not advance		
Stella Sukhanova	Girls' K1 sprint	1:54.64	4	Bye		Massie (AUS); W 1:56.13	Zironi (ITA); W 1:53.82	Rendessy (HUN); L 1:55.09	Zint (GER); W 1:54.25	3rd place, bronze medalist(s)
Stella Sukhanova	Girls' K1 slalom	1:25.55	10	1:28.88	5	Spibar (USA); L 1:28.38	did not advance			

== Cycling ==
Kazakhstan qualified a boys' and girls' combined team based on its ranking in the Youth Olympic Games Junior Nation Rankings.

- Boys' combined team – 1 team of 2 athletes
- Girls' combined team – 1 team of 2 athletes

Athlete	Event	Team time trial			Road race			XC eliminator		XC short circuit			Criterium				Total	
Athlete	Event	Time	Rank	Points	Time	Rank	Points	Rank	Points	Time	Rank	Points	Laps	Sprint pts	Rank	Points	Points	Rank
Gleb Brussenskiy	Boys' combined team	8:17.97	1	100	1:30:58	1	100	30	0	19:47	11	8	16	7	2	80	418	1st place, gold medalist(s)
Yevgeniy Fedorov	Boys' combined team	8:17.97	1	100	1:31:03	8	20	40	0	19:34	2	80	16	4	6	30	418	1st place, gold medalist(s)
Svetlana Pachshenko	Girls' combined team	10:00.49	9	15	1:41:20	1	100	20	2	19:56	16	1	16	0	12	6	149	6
Marina Kurnossova	Girls' combined team	10:00.49	9	15	1:42:19	7	25	28	0	17:31	17	2	16	0	25	0	149	6

== Diving ==
Athlete	Event	Preliminary		Final	
Athlete	Event	Points	Rank	Points	Rank
Yelizaveta Borova	Girls' 10 m platform	260.45	11	271.45	10

== Fencing ==
Kazakhstan qualified one athlete based on its performance at the 2018 Cadet World Championship.

- Girls' Épée – Tamila Muridova

Girls

Athlete	Event	Pool round		Round of 16	Quarterfinals	Semifinals	Final / BM	
Athlete	Event	Opposition Score	Seed	Opposition Score	Opposition Score	Opposition Score	Opposition Score	Rank
Tamila Muridova	Épée	Dékány (HUN) L Leonard (CAN) L Zeboudj (ALG) L Vermeule (USA) L Jaoude (LBN) L Bekmurzova (RUS) L 4–5	6	Kateryna Chorniy (UKR) L 10-15	did not advance			14

== Gymnastics ==
=== Acrobatic ===
Kazakhstan qualified a mixed pair based on its performance at the 2018 Acrobatic Gymnastics World Championship.

- Mixed pair – 1 team of 2 athletes

=== Artistic ===
Kazakhstan qualified one gymnast based on its performance at the 2018 Asian Junior Championship.

- Boys' artistic individual all-around – 1 quota

=== Rhythmic ===
Kazakhstan qualified one gymnast based on its performance at the 2018 Asian Junior Championship.

- Girls' rhythmic individual all-around – 1 quota

=== Trampoline ===
Kazakhstan qualified one gymnast based on its performance at the 2018 Asian Junior Championship.

- Girls' trampoline – 1 quota

== Judo ==
Individual

Athlete	Event	Round of 16	Quarterfinals	Semifinals	Rep 1	Rep 2	Rep 3	Final / BM	
Athlete	Event	Opposition Result	Opposition Result	Opposition Result	Opposition Result	Opposition Result	Opposition Result	Opposition Result	Rank
Margarita Gritsenko	Girls' 78 kg	Bye	Edith Ortiz (ECU); W 10-00	Ester Svobodová (CZE); W 11s1-00	Bye			Raffaela Igl (GER); L 00-11s1	2nd place, silver medalist(s)
Bekarys Saduakas	Boys' 100 kg	Bye	Abolfazl Shojaei (IRI); W 11s1-00	Zsombor Vég (HUN); W 01s1-00s2	Bye			Ilia Sulamanidze (GEO); W 01s2-00s2	1st place, gold medalist(s)

Team

Athletes	Event	Round of 16	Quarterfinals	Semifinals	Final	
Athletes	Event	Opposition Result	Opposition Result	Opposition Result	Opposition Result	Rank
Team London; Yangchen Wangmo (BHU); Daniel Leutgeb (AUT); Noemi Huayhuameza Orneta (PER); Joao Santos (BRA); Rachel Krapman (CAN); Ahmed Rebahi (ALG); Edith Ortiz (ECU); Bekarys Saduakas (KAZ)	Mixed team	Bye	Team Moscow (MIX); W 4–3	Team Beijing (MIX); L 0–7	did not advance	3rd place, bronze medalist(s)
Barcelona; Mikaela Rojas (ARG); Sosorbaram Lkhagvasuren (MGL); Nikol Pencue (COL); Margarita Gritsenko (KAZ); Loreince Nanekoula (GAB); Jalen Kon Elijah (CMR); Mark van Dijk (NED)	Mixed team	Atlanta (MIX); L 3-4	did not advance			9

== Karate ==
Kazakhstan qualified one athlete based on the rankings in the Buenos Aires 2018 Olympic Standings.

- Boys' −68 kg – Abilmansur Batyrgali

Athlete	Event	Group Stage				Semifinal	Final / BM	
Athlete	Event	Opposition Score	Opposition Score	Opposition Score	Rank	Opposition Score	Opposition Score	Rank
Abilmansur Batyrgali	Boys' 68 kg	Yassine Sekouri (MAR); D (0–0)	Juan Salsench (ARG); W (3–0)	Kotaro Nakamura (JPN); W (3–0)	2	Quentin Mahauden (BEL); L (1–3)	did not advance	3rd place, bronze medalist(s)

== Rugby sevens ==
Group stage

Pos	Team	Pld	W	D	L	PF	PA	PD	Pts
1	New Zealand	5	5	0	0	169	27	+142	15
2	France	5	4	0	1	178	45	+133	13
3	Canada	5	3	0	2	125	85	+40	11
4	Colombia	5	2	0	3	66	119	−53	9
5	Kazakhstan	5	1	0	4	44	142	−98	7
6	Tunisia	5	0	0	5	19	183	−164	5

Source: Buenos Aires 2018
Rules for classification: 1) Points; 2) Head-to-head result; 3) Point difference; 4) Points scored.

13 October 2018
12:50

Canada	24–15	Kazakhstan
Try: Grant 2'c Black 4'm de Couvreur 6'm Izyk 13'c Con: Black (2/4) 2', 13'	Report	Try: Odnoletok (3) 8'm, 10'm, 12'm Con: Mikhailenko (0/3)

Club Atlético San Isidro, Buenos Aires
Referee: Lauren Jenner (New Zealand)

13 October 2018
15:30

France	45–0	Kazakhstan
Try: Christiaens (3) 3'c, 4'm, 10'c Sanz 6'c Daumalle 7'c Hapulat 12'm Muller 14'c Con: Plantefeve (2/3) 3', 7'; Christiaens (1/1) 6'; Maran (2/3) 11', 14'	Report

Club Atlético San Isidro, Buenos Aires
Referee: Lauren Jenner (New Zealand)

14 October 2018
12:50

Tunisia	5–24	Kazakhstan
Try: Barhoumi 14'm Con: Barhoumi (0/1)	Report	Try: Odnoletok (3) 0'c, 4'c, 11'm Boichenko 13'm Con: Kamenkova (2/3) 0', 4'; Mikhailenko (0/1)

Club Atlético San Isidro, Buenos Aires
Referee: Katherine Ritchie (Great Britain)

14 October 2018
15:55

Colombia	36–0	Kazakhstan
Try: Ibarra (3) 2'm, 6'c, 11'm Tapias 4'm Ramirez 7'c Mejia 14'c Con: Tapias (2/5) 7', 7'; Mejia (1/1) 14'	Report

Club Atlético San Isidro, Buenos Aires
Referee: Maddy Putz (Australia)

15 October 2018
9:50

New Zealand	32–5	Kazakhstan
Try: Takitimu-Cook 6'm Tairakena 8'm Watene 10'c Dallinger 11'm Tahere (2) 12'm, 14'm Con: Pouri-Lane (1/6) 10'	Report	Try: Odnoletok 0'm Con: Mikhailenko (0/1)

Club Atlético San Isidro, Buenos Aires
Referee: Katherine Ritchie (Great Britain)

Fifth place game

15 October 2018
13:55

Kazakhstan	12–0	Tunisia
Try: Odnoletok (2) 1'c, 12'm Con: Mikhailenko (1/2) 1'	Report

Club Atlético San Isidro, Buenos Aires
Referee: Katherine Ritchie (Great Britain)

== Shooting ==
Individual

Athlete	Event	Qualification		Final	
Athlete	Event	Points	Rank	Points	Rank
Eldar Imankulov	Boys' 10 metre air pistol	566-16	8	197.0	6

Team

Athletes	Event	Qualification		Round of 16	Quarterfinals	Semifinals	Final / BM	Rank
Athletes	Event	Points	Rank	Opposition Result	Opposition Result	Opposition Result	Opposition Result	Rank
Gloria Fernández (ESP); Eldar Imankulov (KAZ)	Mixed 10 metre air pistol	737-13	17	did not advance				

== Taekwondo ==
Athlete	Event	Round of 16	Quarterfinals	Semifinals	Final	
Athlete	Event	Opposition Result	Opposition Result	Opposition Result	Opposition Result	Rank
Assel Usmanova	−44 kg	Minaya Akbarova (AZE); W 14-9	Polina Shcherbakova (RUS); L 1-15	did not advance		
Tangsholpan Kaiyrzhankyzy	−49 kg	Rim Bayaa (SWE); L DSQ	did not advance			

== Tennis ==
Singles

Athlete	Event	Round of 32	Round of 16	Quarterfinals	Semifinals	Final / BM	
Athlete	Event	Opposition Score	Opposition Score	Opposition Score	Opposition Score	Opposition Score	Rank
D Tashbulatov	Boys' singles	C-h Tseng (TPE); L (3,6 4,6)	did not advance				

Doubles

Athlete	Event	Round of 32	Round of 16	Quarterfinals	Semifinals	Final / BM	
Athlete	Event	Opposition Score	Opposition Score	Opposition Score	Opposition Score	Opposition Score	Rank
A Dawani (BHR); D Tashbulatov (KAZ)	Boys' doubles	N Hardt (DOM); P Sydow (ARU); L (0-6, 1–6)	did not advance				
Wang Xiyu (CHN); Dostanbek Tashbulatov (KAZ)	Mixed doubles	Parry (FRA) / Tabur (FRA); W (7-5, 6–2)	Osorio (COL) / Mejía (COL); L (6-4, 4–6, [8-10])	did not advance			9

== Triathlon ==
Individual

Athlete	Event	Swim (750m)	Trans 1	Bike (20 km)	Trans 2	Run (5 km)	Total Time	Rank
Daniil Zubtsov	Boys	11:19	0:31	28:43	0:36	17:58	59:07	26

Relay

Athlete	Event	Total Times per Athlete (Swim 250m, Bike 6.6 km, Run 1.8 km)	Total Group Time	Rank
Asia 1 Lee Jung-won (KOR); Teppei Tokuyama (JPN); Emma Ada Middleditch (SGP); Daniil Zubtsov (KAZ)	Mixed Relay	22:57 (8); 21:44 (9); 24:01 (7); 23:15 (10)	1:31:57	10

== Weightlifting ==
Kazakhstan qualified four athletes based on its performance at the 2017 World Youth Championships.

- ~~Boys' events – 2 quotas~~ (not used)
- ~~Girls' events – 2 quotas~~ (not used)

== Wrestling ==
Key:
- VFA – Victory by Fall
- VSU – Without any points scored by the opponent
- VSU1 – With point(s) scored by the opponent
- VPO – Without any points scored by the opponent
- VPO1 – With point(s) scored by the opponent

Athlete	Event	Group stage					Final / RM	Rank
Athlete	Event	Opposition Score	Opposition Score	Opposition Score	Opposition Score	Rank	Opposition Score	Rank
Nilufar Raimova	Girls' freestyle −49kg	Akhmedova (UZB); L 0 – 11 ^{VSU}	Varakina (BLR); L 0 – 10 ^{VSU}	Mosquera (VEN); L 8 – 14 ^{VPO1}	Ikei (USA); L 0 – 8 ^{VPO}	5 Q	Sim (CAM); W WO	9
