= Athletics at the 2018 Summer Youth Olympics – Girls' triple jump =

Girls' triple jump at the III Summer Youth Olympic Games
- Venue: Parque Polideportivo Roca
- Date: 13, 16 October
- Competitors: 15 from 15 nations

Medalists
| 1st place, gold medalist(s) | | Aleksandra Nacheva | Bulgaria |
| 2nd place, silver medalist(s) | | María Vicente | Spain |
| 3rd place, bronze medalist(s) | | Mariya Privalova | Russia |

The girls' triple jump competition at the 2018 Summer Youth Olympics was held on 13 and 16 October at the Parque Polideportivo Roca.

== Schedule ==
All times are in local time (UTC-3).

| Date | Time | Round |
|---|---|---|
| Saturday, 13 October 2018 | 16:25 | Stage 1 |
| Tuesday, 16 October 2018 | 16:21 | Stage 2 |

== Results ==
=== Stage 1 ===
| Rank | Athlete | Nation | 1 | 2 | 3 | 4 | Result | Notes |
|---|---|---|---|---|---|---|---|---|
| 1 | Aleksandra Nacheva | Bulgaria | 13.11 | 13.76 | 11.48 | 13.32 | 13.76 | |
| 2 | María Vicente | Spain | x | 13.76 | x | 13.13 | 13.76 | |
| 3 | Mariya Privalova | Russia | x | 12.52 | 13.04 | 12.73 | 13.04 | PB |
| 4 | Lesly Raffin | France | x | 13.02w | 12.61 | x | 13.02w | |
| 5 | Roksana Khudoyarova | Uzbekistan | 12.74 | 12.77 | 12.98 | 12.49 | 12.98 | |
| 6 | Viktória Áts | Hungary | x | 12.69 | 12.77 | 12.64 | 12.77 | |
| 7 | Spyridoula Karydi | Greece | x | 12.54 | 12.47 | 12.75 | 12.75 | |
| 8 | Nerisnelia Sousa | Brazil | 12.66 | 12.44 | 12.60 | 12.26 | 12.66 | |
| 9 | Kayla Goodwin | New Zealand | 12.62 | x | x | 12.43 | 12.62 | |
| 10 | Zulia Hernández | Cuba | 12.38 | x | 12.45 | 12.06 | 12.45 | |
| 11 | Gaëlle Maonzambi | Switzerland | x | 12.40 | x | 11.97 | 12.40 | |
| 12 | Monifah Latavia Djoe | Suriname | 11.73 | 11.70 | 12.26 | 11.92 | 12.26 | |
| 13 | Anastassiya Glukhareva | Kazakhstan | 12.02 | 11.98 | 11.88 | 11.48 | 12.02 | |
| 14 | Palina Talankova | Belarus | 12.00 | x | 11.95 | x | 12.00 | |
| 15 | Ghada Hamdani | Tunisia | x | 11.49 | 11.74 | x | 11.74 | |

=== Stage 2 ===
| Rank | Athlete | Nation | 1 | 2 | 3 | 4 | Result | Notes |
|---|---|---|---|---|---|---|---|---|
| 1 | Aleksandra Nacheva | Bulgaria | 13.56 | 13.86 | x | – | 13.86 | |
| 2 | María Vicente | Spain | 13.67 | 13.50w | x | 11.45w | 13.67 | |
| 3 | Mariya Privalova | Russia | 12.80 | 12.93 | 13.03 | 12.68 | 13.03 | |
| 4 | Roksana Khudoyarova | Uzbekistan | 12.94 | 12.81 | x | 12.90 | 12.94 | |
| 5 | Spyridoula Karydi | Greece | x | 12.82 | 12.70 | 12.84 | 12.84 | |
| 6 | Lesly Raffin | France | 12.65 | x | 12.73 | x | 12.73 | |
| 7 | Anastassiya Glukhareva | Kazakhstan | 12.49w | 12.26 | 12.11 | 12.16 | 12.49w | |
| 8 | Nerisnelia Sousa | Brazil | 12.48 | 12.41 | 11.63 | 12.42 | 12.48 | |
| 9 | Viktória Áts | Hungary | 12.38 | x | x | x | 12.38 | |
| 10 | Gaëlle Maonzambi | Switzerland | 12.12 | 11.96 | x | 12.31 | 12.31 | |
| 11 | Kayla Goodwin | New Zealand | 11.36 | x | x | 12.30 | 12.30 | |
| 12 | Zulia Hernández | Cuba | 11.98 | 11.95 | 12.28 | 11.98 | 12.28 | |
| 13 | Monifah Latavia Djoe | Suriname | 11.89 | 11.49 | 11.87 | 11.44 | 11.89 | |
| | Palina Talankova | Belarus | x | x | x | x | NM | |
| | Ghada Hamdani | Tunisia | | | | | DNS | |

=== Final placing ===
| Rank | Athlete | Nation | Stage 1 | Stage 2 | Total |
|---|---|---|---|---|---|
| 1st place, gold medalist(s) | Aleksandra Nacheva | Bulgaria | 13.76 | 13.86 | 27.62 |
| 2nd place, silver medalist(s) | María Vicente | Spain | 13.76 | 13.67 | 27.43 |
| 3rd place, bronze medalist(s) | Mariya Privalova | Russia | 13.04 | 13.03 | 26.07 |
| 4 | Roksana Khudoyarova | Uzbekistan | 12.98 | 12.94 | 25.92 |
| 5 | Lesly Raffin | France | 13.02 | 12.73 | 25.75 |
| 6 | Spyridoula Karydi | Greece | 12.75 | 12.84 | 25.59 |
| 7 | Viktória Áts | Hungary | 12.77 | 12.38 | 25.15 |
| 8 | Nerisnelia Sousa | Brazil | 12.66 | 12.48 | 25.14 |
| 9 | Kayla Goodwin | New Zealand | 12.62 | 12.30 | 24.92 |
| 10 | Zulia Hernández | Cuba | 12.45 | 12.28 | 24.73 |
| 11 | Gaëlle Maonzambi | Switzerland | 12.40 | 12.31 | 24.71 |
| 12 | Anastassiya Glukhareva | Kazakhstan | 12.02 | 12.49 | 24.51 |
| 13 | Monifah Latavia Djoe | Suriname | 12.26 | 11.89 | 24.15 |
| 14 | Palina Talankova | Belarus | 12.00 | NM | 12.00 |
| | Ghada Hamdani | Tunisia | 11.74 | DNS | |
