= Judo at the 2018 Summer Youth Olympics – Girls' 63 kg =

Judo competition

Girls' 63 kg at the III Summer Youth Olympic Games
- Venue: Parque Polideportivo Roca
- Date: 8 October
- Competitors: 11 from 11 nations

Medalists
1st place, gold medalist(s)		Szofi Özbas	Hungary
2nd place, silver medalist(s)		Mariem Khlifi	Tunisia
3rd place, bronze medalist(s)		Alessia Corrao	Belgium
3rd place, bronze medalist(s)		Kim Ju-hee	South Korea

The Girls' 63 kg competition at the 2018 Summer Youth Olympics was held on 8 October, at the Asia Pavilion.

== Schedule ==
All times are in local time (UTC-3).

Date	Time	Round
Sunday, 8 October 2018	10:00; 11:00; 11:00; 12:00; 15:00	Round of 16; Quarterfinals; Repechage Rounds; Semifinals; Finals

== Results ==
Legend

- 1st number — Ippon
- 2nd number — Waza-ari
- s — Shido

=== Main Bracket ===
Round of 16
Saskia Brothers (AUS)	01s1
Yassamine Djellab (ALG)	00s1
Szofi Ozbas (HUN)	11
Rachel Krapman (CAN)	00s1
Kim Ju-hee (KOR)	01
Alessia Corrao (BEL)	11

Quarterfinals
Mariem Khlifi (TUN)	10
Saskia Brothers (AUS)	00
Hasret Bozkurt (TUR)	000
Nikol Pencue (COL)	10s1
Marin Visser (NED)	00
Szofi Özbas (HUN)	10
Itzel Pechá (MEX)	00
Alessia Corrao (BEL)	10

Semifinals
Mariem Khlifi (TUN)	01s1
Nikol Pencue (COL)	00
Szofi Ozbas (HUN)	01s1
Alessia Corrao (BEL)	00

Finals
Mariem Khlifi (TUN)	00s2
Szofi Özbas (HUN)	10s1

=== Repechage ===
Repechage 1

Repechage 2
Yassamine Djellab (ALG)	00
Hasret Bozkurt (TUR)	10
Rachel Krapman (CAN)	00
Itzel Pechá (MEX)	10
Kim Ju-hee (KOR)	01
Marin Visser (NED)	00s2

Repechage 3
Hasret Bozkurt (TUR)	10
Saskia Brothers (AUS)	00
Itzel Pechá (MEX)	00
Kim Ju-hee (KOR)	10

Bronze Medal Finals
Hasret Bozkurt (TUR)	01
Alessia Corrao (BEL)	10
Kim Ju-hee (KOR)	01
Nikol Pencue (COL)	00s1
