= Roller speed skating at the 2018 Summer Youth Olympics =

Roller Speed Skating at the III Summer Youth Olympic Games
- Venue: Paseo de la Costa
- Dates: 7–8 October
- No. of events: 2 (1 boys, 1 girls)
- Competitors: 28 (14 boys, 14 girls)

Roller speed skating at the 2018 Summer Youth Olympics was held from 7 to 8 October. The competition took place at the Paseo de la Costa in Buenos Aires, Argentina. This marked the debut of the sport at the Youth Olympics.

== Qualification ==
Each National Olympic Committee (NOC) was permitted a maximum of two competitors, one boy and one girl. As hosts, Argentina was granted one male and one female competitor, should they not qualify normally, and an additional two competitors, one boy and one girl, were to be decided by the tripartite committee. However, no competitors from Argentina ultimately participated in the event. The remaining places were decided at the 2018 Roller Speed Skating World Championship, with each participating continent guaranteed a spot at the games. No African competitors participated in the 2018 Inline Speed Skating World Championship and, therefore, no competitors representing an African nation participated in the event at the Youth Olympics.

To be eligible to participate at the Youth Olympics athletes must have been born between 1 January 2000 and 31 December 2003.

=== Boys ===
Event	Location	Date	Total Places	Qualified
Argentina (Host Nation)	–	–	~~1~~ 0	
2018 Roller Speed Skating World Championship	(Netherlands) Heerde	1–3 July 2018	~~10~~ 14	Jhonny Angulo (COL); Ewen Foussadier (FRA); Merijn Scheperkamp (NED); Vincenzo Maiorca (ITA); Nahuel Schelling (ARG); Cheon Jong-jin (KOR); Ivan Galar (ESP); ~~Sabien Tinson (USA)~~; Chen Tao (CHN); Chang Chia-wei (TPE); Ignacio Mardones (CHI); David Sarmiento (ECU); Jason Suttels (BEL); Gustavo Rodríguez (VEN); Alexander Myint (AUS)^{A}
Tripartite Invitation	–	–	~~1~~ 0	
TOTAL			14	

^A Continental quota

=== Girls ===
Event	Location	Date	Total Places	Qualified
Argentina (Host Nation)	–	–	~~1~~ 0	
2018 Roller Speed Skating World Championship	(Netherlands) Heerde	1–3 July 2018	~~10~~ 14	Gabriela Rueda (COL); Honorine Barrault (FRA); Giorgia Valanzano (ITA); Nerea Langa (ESP); Ashly Marin (CHI); Angelina Otto (GER); ~~Corinne Stoddard (USA)~~; Marit van Beijnum (NED); ~~Lee Ye-rim (KOR)~~; Wang Kuan-chih (TPE); Andrea Lokvencová (CZE); María Arias (ECU); Fernanda Illanes (ARG); Carolina Ferreira (POR); Patjira Srisathitha (THA); Giselle Stogdale (AUS)^{B}
Tripartite Invitation	–	–	~~1~~ 0	
TOTAL			14	

^B Continental quota

== Medal summary ==
=== Medal table ===
Rank	Nation	Gold	Silver	Bronze	Total
1	Colombia	2	0	0	2
2	Italy	0	1	1	2
3	France	0	1	0	1
4	Netherlands	0	0	1	1
Totals (4 entries)		2	2	2	6

=== Events ===
Event	Gold	Silver	Bronze
Boys' Combined	Jhony Angulo; Colombia	Vincenzo Maiorca; Italy	Merijn Scheperkamp; Netherlands
Girls' Combined	Gabriela Rueda; Colombia	Honorine Barrault; France	Giorgia Valanzano; Italy
