= Canoeing at the 2018 Summer Youth Olympics – Boys' K1 slalom =

Boys' K1 slalom at the III Summer Youth Olympic Games
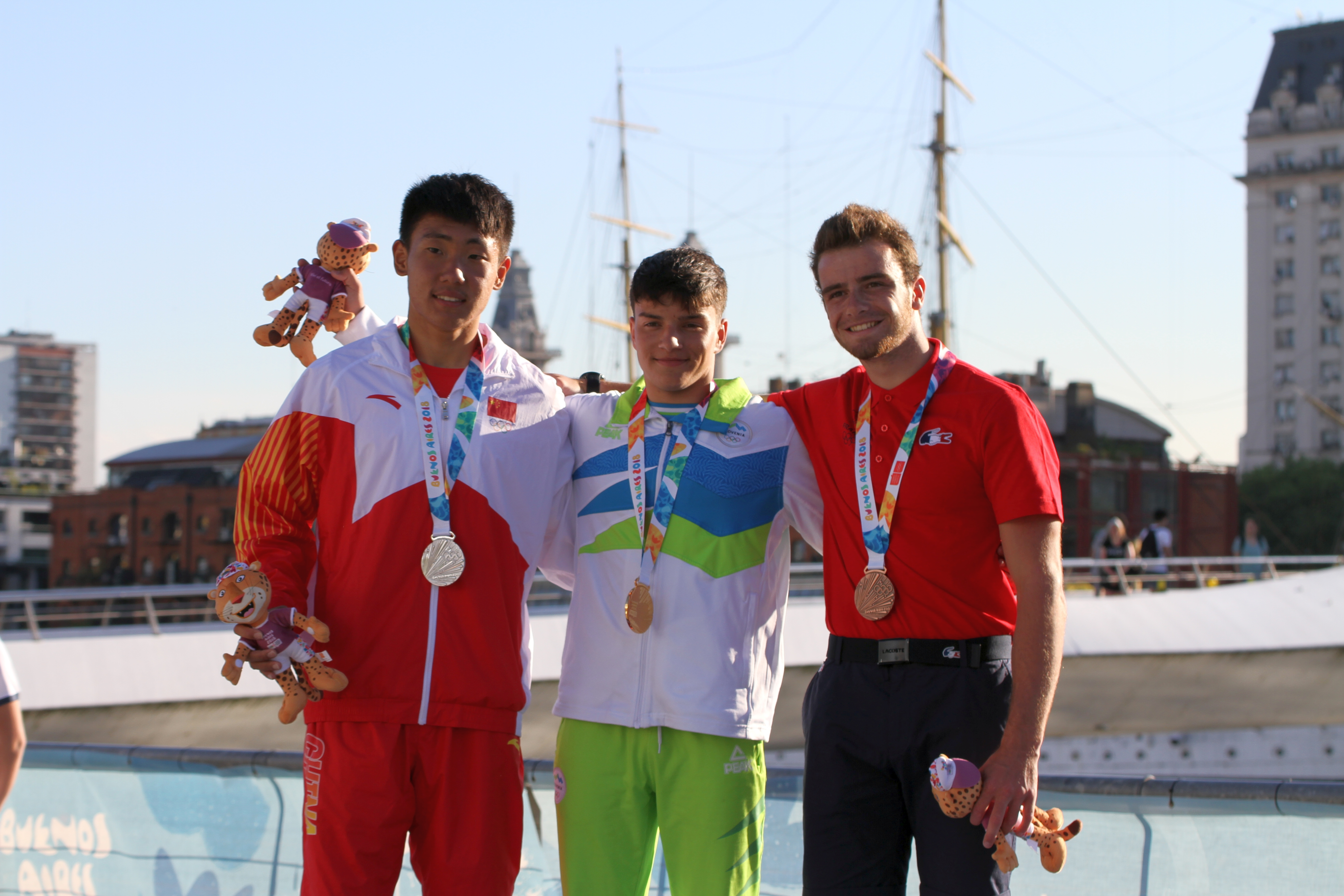
- Guan Changheng (China, silver), Lan Tominc (Slovenia, gold), Tom Bouchardon (France, bronze) at the Victory ceremony
- Venue: Puerto Madero
- Dates: October 16
- Competitors: 15 from 15 nations

Medalists
1st place, gold medalist(s)		Lan Tominc; Slovenia
2nd place, silver medalist(s)		Guan Changheng; China
3rd place, bronze medalist(s)		Tom Bouchardon; France

These are the results for the boys' K1 slalom event at the 2018 Summer Youth Olympics.

== Results ==
=== Qualification ===
Rank	Athlete	Nation	Time	Notes
1	Guan Changheng	China	1:10.62	Q
2	Lan Tominc	Slovenia	1:10.69	Q
3	George Snook	New Zealand	1:14.33	Q
4	Tom Bouchardon	France	1:14.57	Q
5	Valentin Rossi	Argentina	1:15.74	
6	Mikhail Yakovlev	Kazakhstan	1:16.90	
7	Robert Healy	United States	1:17.00	
8	Wojciech Pilarz	Poland	1:17.65	
8	Jules Vangeel	Belgium	1:17.65	
10	Adam Kiss	Hungary	1:17.79	
11	Zayden Ben Hassine	Tunisia	1:24.95	
12	Alberto Chávez Contreras	Mexico	1:28.52	
13	Tomas Hradil	Czech Republic	1:29.70	
14	Sherzod Khakimjonov	Uzbekistan	1:33.09	
	Pierre Thomas van der Westhuyzen	South Africa	DNF	

=== Repechages ===
Rank	Athlete	Nation	Time	Notes
1	Jules Vangeel	Belgium	1:14.95	Q
2	Valentin Rossi	Argentina	1:15.91	Q
3	Adam Kiss	Hungary	1:15.98	Q
4	Wojciech Pilarz	Poland	1:17.13	Q
5	Mikhail Yakovlev	Kazakhstan	1:17.38	
6	Robert Healy	United States	1:19.15	
7	Zayden Ben Hassine	Tunisia	1:22.92	
8	Tomas Hradil	Czech Republic	1:24.50	
9	Alberto Chávez Contreras	Mexico	1:24.63	
10	Sherzod Khakimjonov	Uzbekistan	1:30.81	

=== Quarterfinals ===
Race	Rank	Athlete	Nation	Time	Notes
1	1	Guan Changheng	China	1:10.74	QFS
1	2	Jules Vangeel	Belgium	1:17.45	
2	1	Lan Tominc	Slovenia	1:10.96	QFS
2	2	Valentin Rossi	Argentina	1:14.70	
3	1	George Snook	New Zealand	1:13.35	QFS
3	2	Adam Kiss	Hungary	1:15.37	
4	1	Tom Bouchardon	France	1:13.62	QFS
4	2	Wojciech Pilarz	Poland	1:19.57	

=== Semifinals ===
Race	Rank	Athlete	Nation	Time	Notes
1	1	Guan Changheng	China	1:11.15	QFG
1	2	George Snook	New Zealand	1:16.27	QFB
2	1	Lan Tominc	Slovenia	1:09.34	QFG
2	2	Tom Bouchardon	France	1:15.70	QFB

=== Finals ===
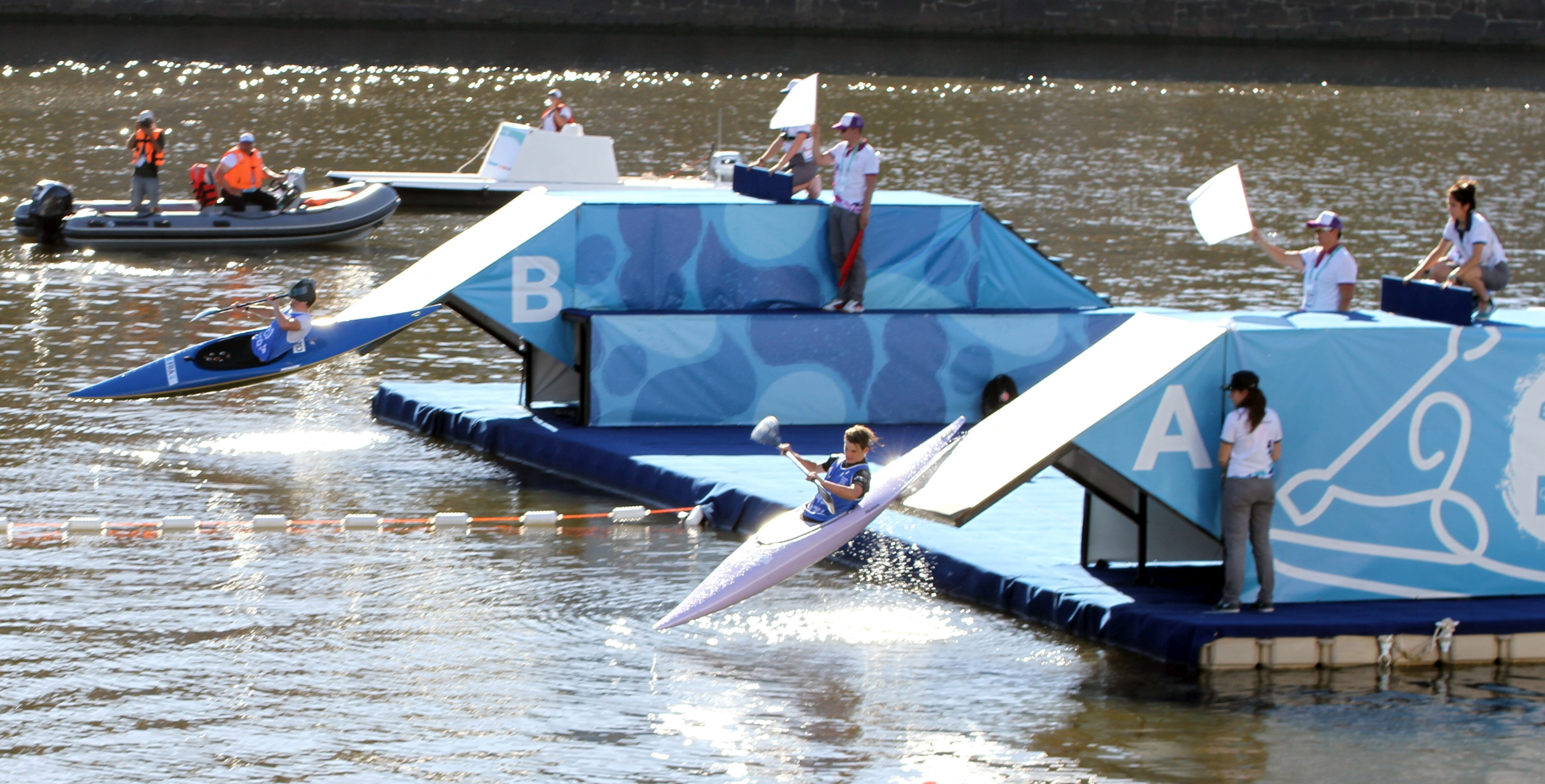
Start of the Bronze Medal Race

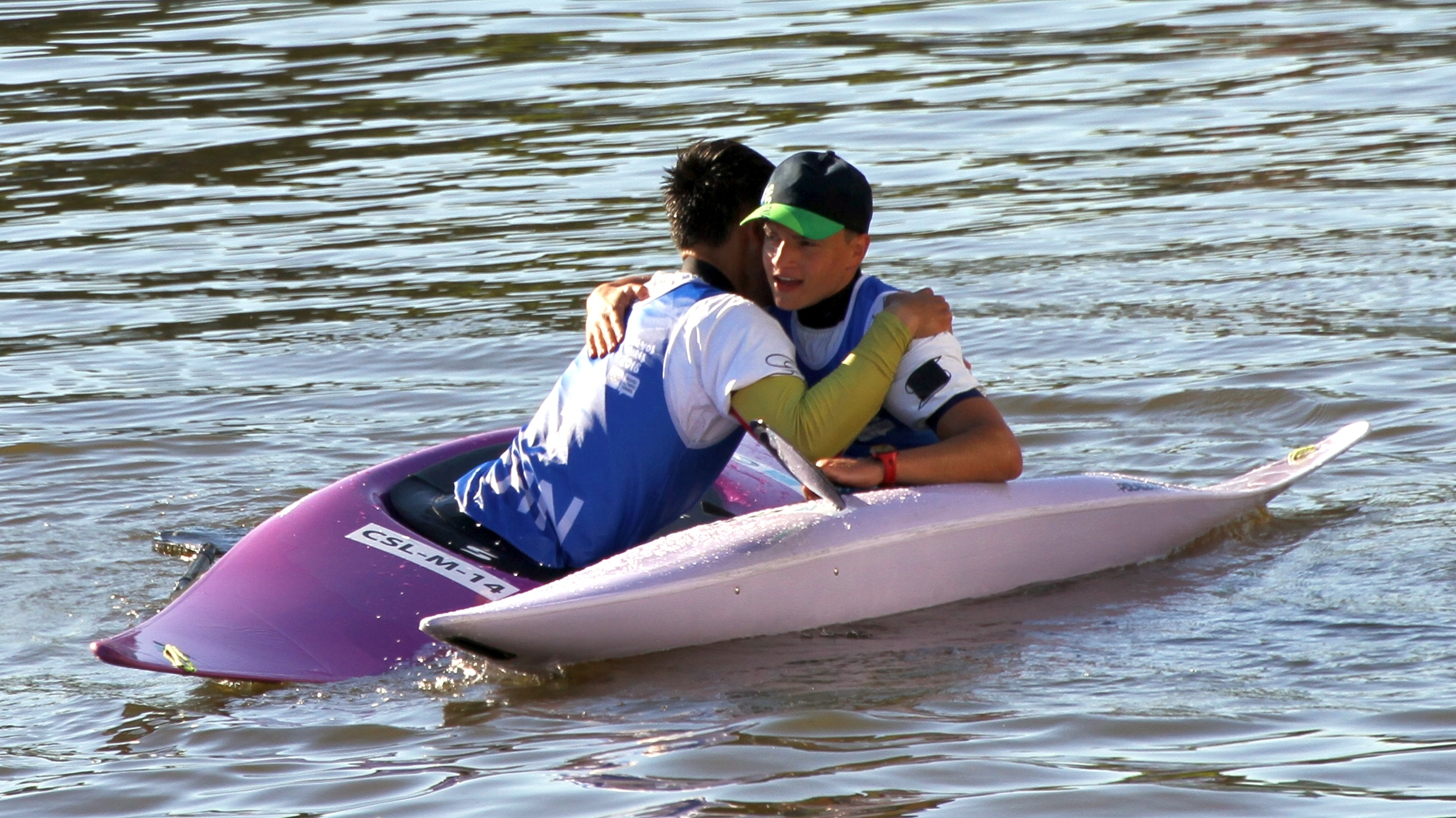
Guan Changheng congrats Lan Tominc after the Gold Medal Race

Rank	Athlete	Nation	Time	Notes
Gold Medal Race
1st place, gold medalist(s)	Lan Tominc	Slovenia	1:08.95	
2nd place, silver medalist(s)	Guan Changheng	China	1:09.92	
Bronze Medal Race
3rd place, bronze medalist(s)	Tom Bouchardon	France	1:11.09	
4	George Snook	New Zealand	1:16.81	
