= Canoeing at the 2018 Summer Youth Olympics – Girls' C1 sprint =

Girls' C1 sprint at the III Summer Youth Olympic Games
- Venue: Puerto Madero
- Dates: October 13
- Competitors: 17 from 16 nations

Medalists
1st place, gold medalist(s)		Gulbakhor Fayzieva; Uzbekistan
2nd place, silver medalist(s)		Laura Gonczol; Hungary
3rd place, bronze medalist(s)		Stephanie Angie Rodríguez Guzmán; Mexico

These are the results for the girls' C1 sprint event at the 2018 Summer Youth Olympics.

== Results ==
=== Qualification ===
Rank	Athlete	Nation	Time	Notes
1	Gulbakhor Fayzieva	Uzbekistan	2:14.22	Q
2	Stephanie Angie Rodríguez Guzmán	Mexico	2:16.69	Q
3	Laura Gonczol	Hungary	2:17.17	Q
4	Antia Otero Santiago	Spain	2:19.30	Q
5	Elnura Nurlanova	Kazakhstan	2:19.48	Q
6	Amina Palamarchuk	Ukraine	2:23.23	Q
7	Darya Marusava	Belarus	2:24.92	Q
8	Nirvana Asadbeki	Iran	2:27.28	Q
9	Blessing Toboh Amusar	Nigeria	2:28.59	
10	Ayomide Emmanuel Bello	Nigeria	2:32.35	
11	Isidora Jesus Arias	Chile	2:36.46	
12	Zoe Hein	United States	2:44.14	
13	Zola Charlotte Marion Lewandowski	Germany	2:49.21	
14	Kahlia Cullwick	New Zealand	2:56.39	
15	Lifa Malapane	Mozambique	3:52.31	
16	Emanuela Luknárová	Slovakia	3:55.57	
17	Doriane Delassus	France	4:08.59	

=== Repechages ===
Rank	Athlete	Nation	Time	Notes
1	Ayomide Emmanuel Bello	Nigeria	2:25.62	Q
2	Zoe Hein	United States	2:34.27	Q
3	Blessing Toboh Amusar	Nigeria	2:34.37	Q
4	Zola Charlotte Marion Lewandowski	Germany	2:41.24	Q
5	Kahlia Cullwick	New Zealand	3:37.85	Q
6	Isidora Jesus Arias	Chile	3:52.79	Q
7	Doriane Delassus	France	4:05.79	Q
8	Lifa Malapane	Mozambique	5:23.59	Q
9	Emanuela Luknárová	Slovakia	6:46.85	

=== Last 16 ===
Race	Rank	Athlete	Nation	Time	Notes
1	1	Gulbakhor Fayzieva	Uzbekistan	2:10.38	Q
1	2	Ayomide Emmanuel Bello	Nigeria	2:23.12	
2	1	Stephanie Angie Rodríguez Guzmán	Mexico	2:18.53	Q
2	2	Zoe Hein	United States	2:38.67	
3	1	Laura Gonczol	Hungary	2:14.85	Q
3	2	Blessing Toboh Amusar	Nigeria	2:32.75	
4	1	Antia Otero Santiago	Spain	2:25.98	Q
4	2	Zola Charlotte Marion Lewandowski	Germany	2:39.05	
5	1	Elnura Nurlanova	Kazakhstan	2:19.58	Q
5	2	Kahlia Cullwick	New Zealand	3:10.30	
6	1	Amina Palamarchuk	Ukraine	2:20.61	Q
6	2	Isidora Jesus Arias	Chile	2:34.91	
7	1	Darya Marusava	Belarus	2:20.07	Q
7	2	Doriane Delassus	France	4:00.38	
8	1	Nirvana Asadbeki	Iran	2:26.89	Q
8	2	Lifa Malapane	Mozambique	3:53.99	

=== Quarterfinals ===
Race	Rank	Athlete	Nation	Time	Notes
1	1	Gulbakhor Fayzieva	Uzbekistan	2:13.08	QFS
2	2	Darya Marusava	Belarus	2:21.34	
2	1	Laura Gonczol	Hungary	2:11.24	QFS
2	2	Amina Palamarchuk	Ukraine	2:31.18	
3	1	Stephanie Angie Rodríguez Guzmán	Mexico	2:16.52	QFS
3	2	Antia Otero Santiago	Spain	2:19.94	
4	1	Elnura Nurlanova	Kazakhstan	2:20.95	QFS
4	2	Nirvana Asadbeki	Iran	2:28.81	

=== Semifinals ===
Race	Rank	Athlete	Nation	Time	Notes
1	1	Laura Gonczol	Hungary	2:15.02	QFG
1	2	Stephanie Angie Rodríguez Guzmán	Mexico	2:16.22	QFB
2	1	Gulbakhor Fayzieva	Uzbekistan	2:10.62	QFG
2	2	Elnura Nurlanova	Kazakhstan	2:22.61	QFB

=== Finals ===
Rank	Athlete	Nation	Time	Notes
Gold Medal Race
1st place, gold medalist(s)	Gulbakhor Fayzieva	Uzbekistan	2:06.28	
2nd place, silver medalist(s)	Laura Gonczol	Hungary	2:16.14	
Bronze Medal Race
3rd place, bronze medalist(s)	Stephanie Angie Rodríguez Guzmán	Mexico	2:16.04	
4	Elnura Nurlanova	Kazakhstan	2:22.19	
