= Canoeing at the 2018 Summer Youth Olympics – Boys' K1 sprint =

Boys' K1 sprint at the III Summer Youth Olympic Games
- Venue: Puerto Madero
- Dates: 13 October
- Competitors: 15 from 15 nations

Medalists
1st place, gold medalist(s)		Ádám Kiss	Hungary
2nd place, silver medalist(s)		Jules Vangeel	Belgium
3rd place, bronze medalist(s)		Valentin Rossi	Argentina

These are the results for the boys' K1 sprint event at the 2018 Summer Youth Olympics.

== Results ==
=== Qualification ===
Rank	Athlete	Nation	Time	Notes
1	Tomáš Hradil	Czech Republic	1:40.11	Q
2	Jules Vangeel	Belgium	1:40.67	Q
3	Valentin Rossi	Argentina	1:40.93	Q
4	Wojciech Pilarz	Poland	1:42.64	Q
5	Ádám Kiss	Hungary	1:43.36	
6	Mikhail Yakovlev	Kazakhstan	1:44.90	
7	Sherzod Khakimjonov	Uzbekistan	1:44.91	
8	Pierre Thomas van der Westhuyzen	South Africa	1:45.58	
9	Alberto Chávez Contreras	Mexico	1:48.75	
10	Tom Bouchardon	France	1:50.83	
11	Zayden Ben Hassine	Tunisia	1:50.95	
12	Lan Tominc	Slovenia	1:55.95	
13	George Snook	New Zealand	1:59.00	
14	Guan Changheng	China	2:00.94	
15	Robert Healy	United States	2:09.24	

=== Repechages ===
Rank	Athlete	Nation	Time	Notes
1	Ádám Kiss	Hungary	1:41.49	Q
2	Sherzod Khakimjonov	Uzbekistan	1:43.50	Q
3	Pierre Thomas van der Westhuyzen	South Africa	1:45.78	Q
4	Mikhail Yakovlev	Kazakhstan	1:46.19	Q
5	Alberto Chávez Contreras	Mexico	1:46.75	
6	Tom Bouchardon	France	1:50.46	
7	Lan Tominc	Slovenia	1:58.29	
8	George Snook	New Zealand	2:00.50	
9	Guan Changheng	China	2:01.74	
10	Robert Healy	United States	2:09.11	
11	Zayden Ben Hassine	Tunisia	DSQ	

=== Quarterfinals ===
Race	Rank	Athlete	Nation	Time	Notes
1	1	Ádám Kiss	Hungary	1:42.91	QFS
1	2	Tomáš Hradil	Czech Republic	DNF	
2	1	Jules Vangeel	Belgium	1:40.69	QFS
2	2	Sherzod Khakimjonov	Uzbekistan	1:42.76	
3	1	Valentin Rossi	Argentina	1:40.76	QFS
3	2	Pierre Thomas van der Westhuyzen	South Africa	1:46.22	
4	1	Wojciech Pilarz	Poland	1:42.63	QFS
4	2	Mikhail Yakovlev	Kazakhstan	1:45.40	

=== Semifinals ===
Race	Rank	Athlete	Nation	Time	Notes
1	1	Jules Vangeel	Belgium	1:39.52	QFG
1	2	Wojciech Pilarz	Poland	1:41.22	QFB
2	1	Ádám Kiss	Hungary	1:38.49	QFG
2	2	Valentin Rossi	Argentina	1:39.48	QFB

=== Finals ===
Rank	Athlete	Nation	Time	Notes
Gold Medal Race
1st place, gold medalist(s)	Ádám Kiss	Hungary	1:38.770	
2nd place, silver medalist(s)	Jules Vangeel	Belgium	1:39.880	
Bronze Medal Race
3rd place, bronze medalist(s)	Valentin Rossi	Argentina	1:38.88	
4	Wojciech Pilarz	Poland	1:41.11	
