= Delaney Aikens =

Canadian rugby sevens player

- Born: 2000 (age 25–26) Moose Jaw, Saskatchewan
- Height: 163 cm (5 ft 4 in)
- Weight: 61 kg (134 lb)
- University: University of British Columbia

Rugby union career
Senior career
Years	Team	Apps	(Points)
2021-present	Northern Loonies		
National sevens team
Years	Team		Comps
2019-present	Canada		
Medal record
Women's rugby sevens
Representing Canada
Pan American Games
Gold medal – first place	2019 Lima	Team competition
Summer Youth Olympics
Bronze medal – third place	2018 Buenos Aires	Team competition

Delaney Aikens (born 2000) is a Canadian rugby sevens player. She won a gold medal at the 2019 Pan American Games as a member of the Canada women's national rugby sevens team.

Aikens has been part of the Premier Rugby Sevens Northern Loonies team, winning the women's championship in 2021 and 2023. Aikens also won Championship MVP in 2021.
