= Keyara Wardley =

Canadian rugby sevens player (born 1998)

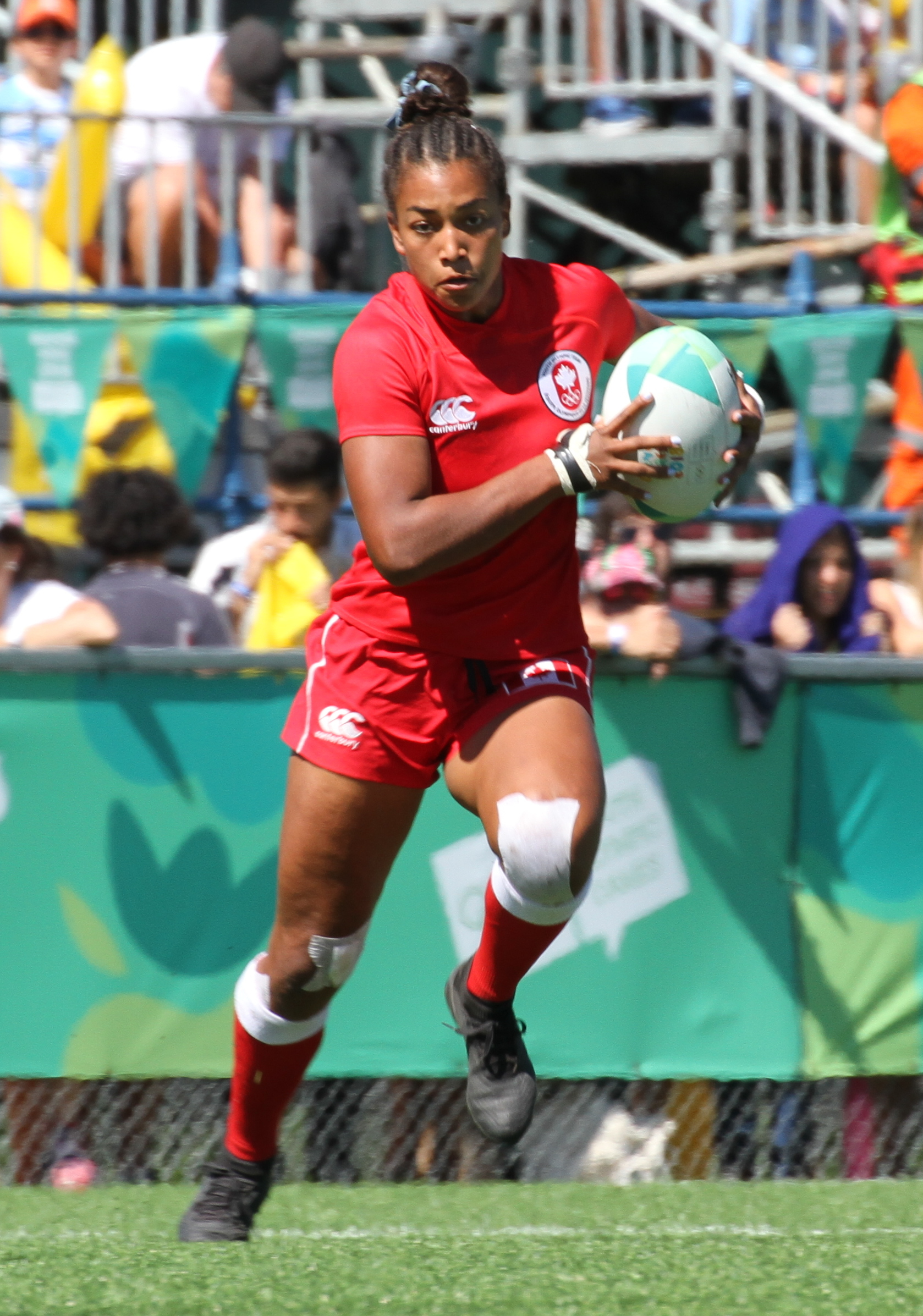
- Wardley at the 2018 Summer Youth Olympics
- Born: January 27, 2000 (age 26) Calgary, Alberta, Canada
- Height: 165 cm (5 ft 5 in)
- Weight: 68 kg (150 lb)

Rugby union career
National sevens team
Years	Team	Comps
- Canada
Medal record
Women's Rugby sevens
Representing Canada
Olympics
Silver medal – second place	2024 Paris	Team competition
Summer Youth Olympics
Bronze medal – third place	2018 Buenos Aires	Team

Keyara Wardley (born January 27, 2000) is a Canadian rugby union player, in the sevens discipline.

== Career ==
Wardley was part of Canada's 2018 Summer Youth Olympics team that won the bronze medal.

In June 2021, Wardley was named to Canada's 2020 Olympic team. She competed for Canada at the 2022 Rugby World Cup Sevens in Cape Town. They placed sixth overall after losing to Fiji in the fifth place final.

She was chosen for the 2024 Summer Olympics in Paris, France. The team won a silver medal, coming from 0-12 behind to defeat Australia 21-12 in the semi-finals, before losing the final to New Zealand.
