= Olivia De Couvreur =

Canadian rugby sevens player

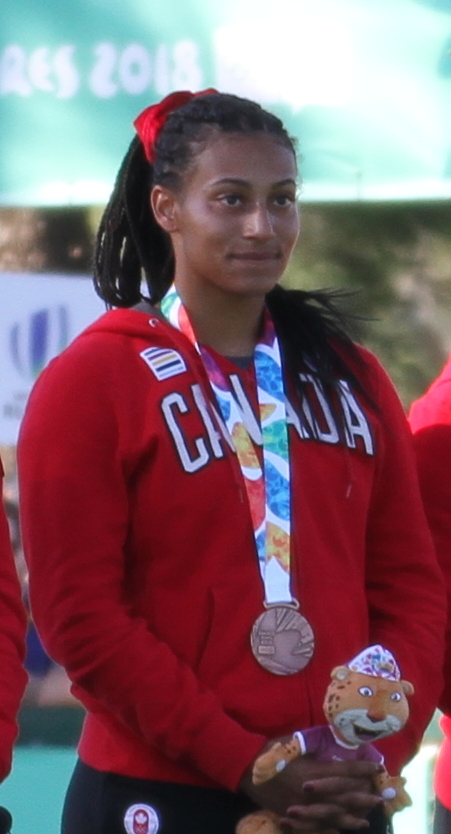
- De Couvreur at the 2018 Summer Youth Olympics
- Born: February 20, 2000 (age 26) Ottawa, Ontario
- Height: 1.73 m (5 ft 8 in)
- Weight: 78 kg (172 lb)

Rugby union career
- Position: Prop
National sevens team
Years	Team	Comps
2019–present	Canada	
Medal record
Women's rugby sevens
Representing Canada
Pan American Games
Gold medal – first place	2019 Lima	Team
Silver medal – second place	2023 Santiago	Team
Summer Youth Olympics
Bronze medal – third place	2018 Buenos Aires	Team

Olivia De Couvreur (born 20 February 2000) is a Canadian rugby sevens player. She won a gold medal at the 2019 Pan American Games as a member of the Canada women's national rugby sevens team.

De Couvreur took up the game of rugby after watching the Canadian 7s win bronze at the 2016 Summer Olympics, switching over from soccer. Two years later she competed at the 2018 Summer Youth Olympics where she won a bronze medal as part of the Canadian national team that competed at those games.

In 2022, De Couvreur competed for Canada at the Rugby World Cup Sevens in Cape Town. They placed sixth overall after losing to Fiji in the fifth place final.
