= Lou Noël =

French rugby sevens player

- Full name: Lou Noël-Rivier
- Born: 25 November 2000 (age 25) Béziers, France
- Height: 1.65 m (5 ft 5 in)
- Weight: 68 kg (150 lb)

Rugby union career
- Position: Wing
Senior career
Years	Team	Apps	(Points)
- FC Grenoble Amazones
National sevens team
Years	Team		Comps
- France
Medal record
Women's rugby sevens
Representing France
Rugby World Cup Sevens
Bronze medal – third place	2022 Cape Town	Team competition

Lou Noël-Rivier (born 25 November 2000) is a French rugby sevens player. She won a bronze medal at the 2022 Rugby World Cup Sevens. She competed for France at the 2024 Summer Olympics.
