= Mahina Paul =

NZ rugby sevens player

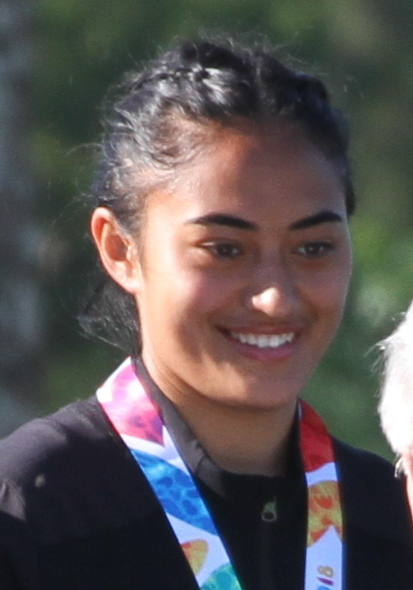
- Paul in 2018
- Born: 19 April 2001 (age 25) Whakatāne, New Zealand
- Height: 1.65 m (5 ft 5 in)
- Weight: 74 kg (163 lb)
- Notable relative: Mererangi Paul (sister)

Rugby union career
Amateur team(s)
Years	Team	Apps	(Points)
	Rangataua		(0)
Provincial / State sides
Years	Team	Apps	(Points)
2020 – present	Bay of Plenty	10	(45)
National sevens team
Years	Team		Comps
2019 – present	New Zealand		78 apps
Medal record
Representing New Zealand
Women's rugby sevens
Olympic Games
Gold medal – first place	2024 Paris	Team competition

Mahina Paul (born 19 April 2001) is a New Zealand rugby sevens player. She was a member of the New Zealand Women's Sevens team when they won a gold medal at the 2024 Summer Olympics in Paris.

== Rugby career ==
Paul has represented New Zealand in touch rugby and at the Youth Olympic Games for rugby sevens in 2018.

Paul made her Black Ferns Sevens international debut at the South Africa Sevens in Cape Town in 2019. She was one of three players who were handed professional contracts earlier that year. She later featured at the 2020 New Zealand Sevens in Hamilton.

Paul was named as a travelling reserve for the Black Ferns Sevens squad to the 2022 Commonwealth Games in Birmingham.

On 20 June 2024 it was announced that she had been selected as a member of the New Zealand Women's Rugby Sevens team for the Paris Olympics. The team won the gold medal, defeating Canada 19–12 in the final.

== See also ==
- List of Youth Olympic Games gold medalists who won Olympic gold medals
