= Alycia Chrystiaens =

French rugby sevens player

- Born: 12 January 2001 (age 25) Roubaix, France
- Height: 1.68 m (5 ft 6 in)
- Weight: 58 kg (128 lb)

Rugby union career
National sevens team
Years	Team	Comps
- France
Medal record
Women's rugby sevens
Representing France
Rugby World Cup Sevens
Bronze medal – third place	2022 Cape Town	Team competition

Alycia Chrystiaens (born 12 January 2001), also spelled Christiaens, is a French rugby sevens player. She plays for Lille Métropole RC Villeneuvois. She won a bronze medal at the 2022 Rugby World Cup Sevens.
