= Iritana Hohaia =

NZ international rugby union player

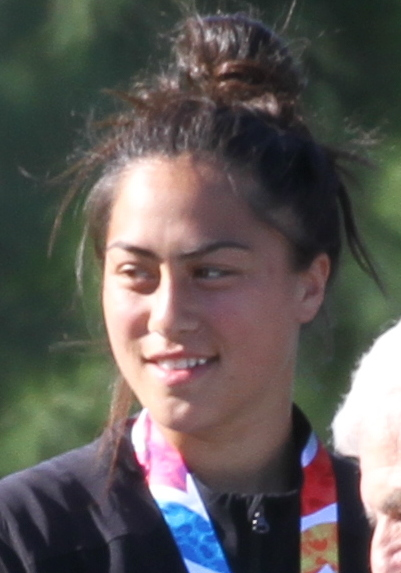
- Hohaia in 2018
- Born: 1 March 2000 (age 26) New Plymouth, New Zealand
- Height: 1.64 m (5 ft 5 in)
- Weight: 65 kg (143 lb)

Rugby union career
- Position: Halfback
Provincial / State sides
Years	Team	Apps	(Points)
2019–2023	Taranaki	13	(30)
Super Rugby
Years	Team	Apps	(Points)
2021	Chiefs Manawa	1	(0)
2022–	Hurricanes Poua	17	(5)
International career
Years	Team	Apps	(Points)
2023–	New Zealand	19	(5)
Medal record
Women's rugby union
Representing New Zealand
World Cup
Bronze medal – third place	2025 England	Team competition

Iritana Hohaia (born 1 March 2000) is a New Zealand rugby union player. She plays halfback for Taranaki provincially and for Hurricanes Poua professionally.

== Personal life ==
Hohaia was born in Ōpunake in Taranaki. She began playing club rugby at Coastal as a child and has also played representative Basketball. She is also a police officer for the New Zealand Police.

== Rugby career ==
=== 2018–20 ===
Hohaia won a gold medal with the New Zealand Sevens team at the 2018 Youth Olympics in Buenos Aires. She was named Taranaki Whio's Player of the Year in 2019. In 2020, she played for the Possibles against the Probables in a Black Ferns trial match and then later appeared for the New Zealand Barbarians against the Black Ferns.

=== 2021–25 ===
For 2021 she was selected for the Black Ferns squad for two test matches against England and France. She was contracted by the Hurricanes Poua for their first-ever women's squad for the inaugural season of Super Rugby Aupiki.

Hohaia received her first fulltime Black Ferns contract in 2023, she was one of three players whose names were finalised to join the contracted group. She was selected in the Black Ferns 30-player squad to compete in the Pacific Four Series and O’Reilly Cup. She made her international debut against Australia on 29 June 2023 at Brisbane. She then featured in her sides 21–52 victory over Canada at the Pacific Four Series in Ottawa.

In July 2025, she was named in the Black Ferns squad to the Women's Rugby World Cup.
