= Carys Dallinger =

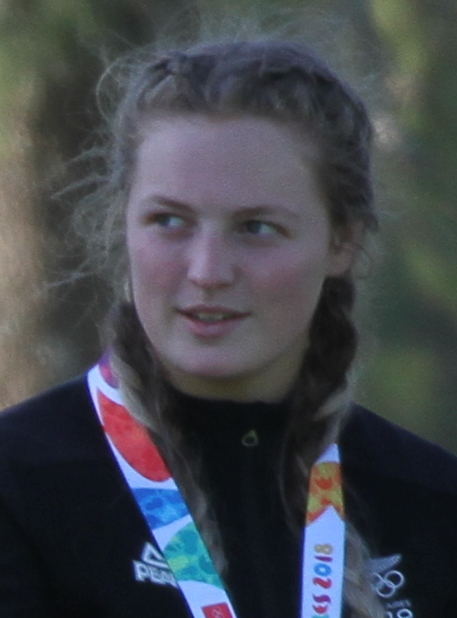
- Born: 30 April 2000 (age 26) Rotorua, New Zealand
- Height: 164 cm (5 ft 5 in)
- Weight: 70 kg (154 lb)
- School: Feilding High School & Manukura

Rugby union career
- Position: Fly-half
Provincial / State sides
| Years | Team | Apps | (Points) |
| 2018–2022 | Manawatū Cyclones | 27 | (172) |
Super Rugby
| Years | Team | Apps | (Points) |
| 2022–2023 | Hurricanes Poua | 7 | (23) |
| 2023–Present | Queensland Reds | 3 | (11) |
International career
| Years | Team | Apps | (Points) |
| 2023 | Australia | 6 | (0) |

Carys Dallinger (born 30 April 2000) is a New Zealand-born Australian rugby union player. She plays for the Queensland Reds in the Super W competition. She previously played for Hurricanes Poua in the Super Rugby Aupiki competition.

== Early life ==
Dallinger was born in Rotorua, New Zealand, and was eligible to represent Australia through her father, who was born in Melbourne; both her paternal and maternal grandparents were born in England.

== Rugby career ==
In 2022, Dallinger was sidelined for three months due to a severe bout of COVID-19 which ruined her hopes of competing in the Rugby World Cup in New Zealand. She has played for the Manawatū Cyclones in the Farah Palmer Cup.

Dallinger was contracted with Hurricanes Poua for the 2023 Super Rugby Aupiki season. She then joined Queensland Reds halfway through the season in early April, and helped them to the Super W final, her side lost to the Fijiana Drua 30–38.

Dallinger accepted the opportunity to represent Australia after narrowly missing out on a Black Ferns contract. She made her test debut for the Wallaroos against Fiji on 20 May 2023 at the Allianz Stadium.

== Personal life ==
Dallinger works as a teacher's aid, she helps children and adults with disabilities.
