= Risi Pouri-Lane =

New Zealand rugby sevens player

- Pouri-Lane speaks to media at the 2023 Hong Kong Sevens
- Full name: Risealeaana Pouri-Lane
- Born: 28 May 2000 (age 26) Auburn, Sydney, Australia
- Height: 1.64 m (5 ft 5 in)
- Weight: 66 kg (146 lb)

Rugby union career
- Position: Scrum-half
International career
Years	Team	Apps	(Points)
2025–	New Zealand	7	(5)
National sevens team
Years	Team		Comps
2018–present	New Zealand 7s		143 apps
Medal record
Women's rugby sevens
Representing New Zealand
Olympic Games
Gold medal – first place	2024 Paris	Team competition
Gold medal – first place	2020 Tokyo	Team competition
Rugby World Cup Sevens
Silver medal – second place	2022 Cape Town	Team competition
Commonwealth Games
Gold medal – first place	2018 Gold Coast	Team
Bronze medal – third place	2022 Birmingham	Team competition
Women's rugby union
Representing New Zealand
World Cup
Bronze medal – third place	2025 England	Team competition

Risealeaana "Risi" Pouri-Lane (born 28 May 2000) is a New Zealand rugby union and sevens player. She captained the 2018 Youth Olympics squad that won gold in Buenos Aires. She also won gold medals with the Black Ferns sevens team at the 2018 Commonwealth Games, the 2020 Summer Olympics and 2024 Summer Olympics.

She is the only New Zealander to have won a gold medal at both a youth and summer Olympics. (Her 2024 Olympic team-mate Jazmin Hotham was selected for the 2018 Youth Olympics but was ruled out through injury.) She made her international debut for the Black Ferns fifteens in 2025.

== Early life ==
Pouri-Lane was born on 28 May 2000 in Auburn, Sydney, Australia, to New Zealanders Lealofi and Kevin Pouri-Lane. When she was three years old her family returned to New Zealand, settling in Motueka, where she attended Motueka High School.

At the age of five she began judo and went on to win several national age group competitions. She represented New Zealand at the 2016 judo Oceania championships. At the age of 10, she started playing touch rugby as a social player. She soon graduated to playing at a competitive level playing in the Motueka High School mixed touch team at the national secondary school tournament in 2016. At the age of 17 she played for the New Zealand under 18 women's team in the Trans-Tasman tournament. She also played in the school's girls 15-a-side and sevens rugby teams, and was good enough while at high school to play for the Tasman women's sevens in the national tournament. As well as continuing with judo she also competed in athletics and netball while at high school. These commitments clashed in 2015, when she had to decide between athletics, Condor sevens rugby and touch rugby national secondary school sports events, all occurring on the same weekend. She choose to attend the Condor sevens national tournament.

== Rugby career ==
=== Sevens ===
In 2017, she was selected at the age of 16 for the New Zealand sevens development squad, with whom played in Japan and Australia. In early 2018, she was awarded a 12-month contract with the New Zealand women's national rugby sevens team. Aged 17, she was the youngest fully-contracted player.

She took time away from the senior team to captain the New Zealand sevens team which won gold at the 2018 Summer Youth Olympics in Buenos Aires in October 2018.

Upon her return from Buenos Aires she made her debut for the senior team at the 2018 Dubai tournament.

==== 2018 Gold Coast Commonwealth Games ====
Just prior to departure for their pre-camp on the Sunshine Coast for the Gold Coast Commonwealth Games Kat Whata-Simpkins suffered a hamstring injury, which resulted first in Pouri-Lane being added to the travelling team. When it was confirmed that Whata-Simpkins would not recover in time for the tournament, Tenika Willison was promoted to the initial 12. Alena Saili was made a travelling reserve or 13th player with Pouri-Lane staying on as another reserve. After injuries to other players in the warm-up to the final against Australia, Pouri-Lane was promoted to the playing 12, and came on in the last moments of the game to assist the team in winning the gold medal.

In January 2019, she was awarded another 12-month contract with the sevens team.

==== 2020 Tokyo Olympic Games ====
She was selected for the New Zealand Women's Rugby Sevens team for the Tokyo Olympics which went on to win the gold medal. Upon her return from Tokyo she spent 14 days isolating at a managed isolation and quarantine (MIQ) facility before being reunited with family and released into the general population.

==== 2022 Birmingham Commonwealth Games ====
She was named in the Black Ferns Sevens squad for the 2022 Commonwealth Games in Birmingham, and won a bronze medal at the event. She later won a silver medal at the 2022 Rugby World Cup Sevens in Cape Town.

==== 2022–23 World Rugby Women's Sevens Series ====
After captain Sarah Hirini became unable to finish the 2023–24 World Rugby SVNS Series after rupturing a anterior cruciate ligament in the second game of the first tournament of the season in Dubai on 2–3 December, Pouri-Lane took over the captaincy of the Black Ferns for the remainder of the season, and led them to winning the Sevens league title. The team then came third at the Grand Final in Madrid. Over the course of the competition she played 43 games, and scored 15 tries.

==== 2024 Paris Olympics ====
On 20 June 2024, it was announced that she had been selected as a member of the New Zealand Women's Rugby Sevens team for the Paris Olympics. When Sarah Hirini returned to the team after recovering from injury, it was decided that Hirini and Pouri-Lane would co-captain the team. The team won the gold medal, defeating Canada 19–12 in the final.

In February 2026 Pouri-Lane re-signed with New Zealand Rugby through to the Olympics in 2028.

She scored her 70th sevens try in the final against Australia in Perth 2026.

=== Fifteens ===
Pouri-Lane made her test debut for the Black Ferns on 24 May 2025 at Albany, New Zealand against the United States in the final match of the Pacific Four Series. Later in July, she was named in the Black Ferns squad to the Women's Rugby World Cup.

At the rugby she played in seven matches, scoring a try against Japan.

== Personal life ==
Pouri-Lane is of Samoan and Māori descent and affiliates to the Ngāti Kuia, Ngāti Koata, Ngāi Tahu iwi.

== See also ==
- List of Youth Olympic Games gold medalists who won Olympic gold medals
