= Montessa Tairakena =

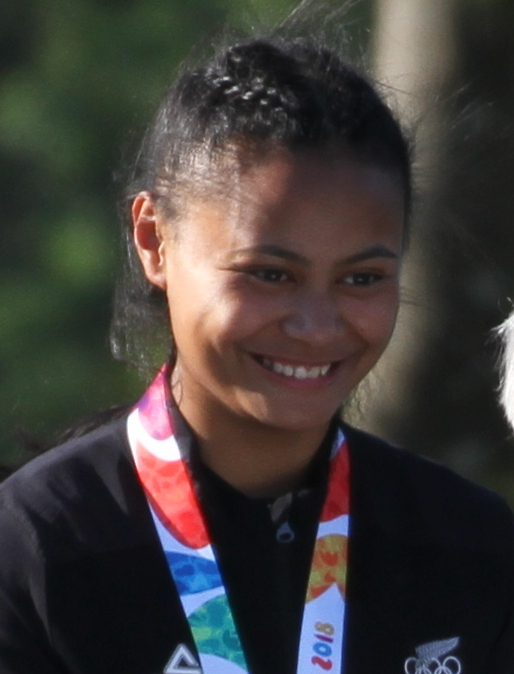
- Tairakena in 2018
- Born: 12 September 2000 (age 26)
- Height: 1.62 m (5 ft 4 in)
- Weight: 65 kg (143 lb)

Rugby union career
- Position: Wing
Provincial / State sides
Years	Team	Apps	(Points)
2021–Present	Waikato	9	(15)
National sevens team
Years	Team		Comps
2019–Present	New Zealand		3 (10)

Montessa Tairakena (born 12 September 2000) is a New Zealand rugby sevens player.

== Early life and career ==
Tairakena has also represented New Zealand in athletics and touch rugby. She is of Maori descent and is from the Tainui iwi. She attended Hamilton Girls' High School and captained their 1st XV to a national title in September 2018. A month later she was a member of the Youth Olympic Games Sevens team that won gold.

== Rugby career ==
In 2019, she made her Black Ferns Sevens international debut at the USA Women's Sevens in Glendale, Colorado. She scored one of five unanswered tries in their third place win against France at the tournament.

She was named in the Bolt Women's side for the 2020 Red Bull Ignite7s tournament at Blake Park in Mt Maunganui. She scored the first try in their 21–7 win in the final.

Tairakena competed for the Black Ferns Sevens White team at the Takiwhitu Tutūru tournament in Wellington. She was named in Waikato's XVs squad for the 2021 Farah Palmer Cup season.
