= Russia at the 2018 Summer Youth Olympics =

- IOC code: RUS
- NOC: Russian Olympic Committee
- Website: www.olympic.ru (in Russian)

in Buenos Aires
- Competitors: 93 in 24 sports
- Flag bearers: Kliment Kolesnikov (opening); Sergey Chernyshyov (closing)
- Medals Ranked 1st: Gold 29 Silver 18 Bronze 12 Total 59

Summer Youth Olympics appearances (overview)
- 2010; 2014; 2018; 2026

Russia competed at the 2018 Summer Youth Olympics, in Buenos Aires, Argentina from 6 to 18 October 2018. A total of 93 athletes competed in 24 sports. There were no Russian athletes in badminton, canoeing, equestrian, field hockey, golf, roller speed skating, rowing, rugby sevens and weightlifting.

The Olympic banner was passed to Kliment Kolesnikov by Stanislav Pozdnyakov, president of the Russian Olympic Committee. The flagbearer in the closing ceremony was Sergei Chernyshev, the first Olympic breakdance gold medalist.

Already on Day 10, Russia topped the medal table of the Youth Olympics, with 25 gold, 15 silver and 12 bronze medals collecting. On the next day they collected three more gold medals and one more silver medal, breaking their previous Olympics' record by number of gold medals. Also on the last day, Russia broke another record by total medals, winning overall 59 medals, two more than in the previous Olympics.

== Medalists ==
Medals awarded to participants of mixed-NOC teams are represented in italics. These medals are not counted towards the individual NOC medal tally.

Medal	Name	Sport	Event	Date
Gold	Grigorii Shamakov	Shooting	Boys' 10 m air rifle	7 October
Gold	Ilia Beskrovnyy; Varvara Ovchinnikova	Cycling	Mixed BMX racing	7 October
Gold	Polina Egorova; Vladislav Gerasimenko*; Elizaveta Klevanovich; Kliment Kolesnikov; Anastasia Makarova*; Daniil Markov*; Andrei Minakov; Daria Vaskina*	Swimming	Mixed 4 × 100 m freestyle relay	7 October
Gold	Polina Shcherbakova	Taekwondo	Girls' 44 kg	7 October
Gold	Dmitrii Shishko	Taekwondo	Boys' 48 kg	7 October
Gold	Irena Khubulova	Judo	Girls' 52 kg	8 October
Gold	Sergey Chernyshyov	Dancesport	B-Boys'	8 October
Gold	Kliment Kolesnikov	Swimming	Boys' 100 m backstroke	8 October
Gold	Daria Vaskina	Swimming	Girls' 100 m backstroke	8 October
Gold	Elizaveta Ryadninskaya	Taekwondo	Girls' 49 kg	8 October
Gold	Georgy Popov	Taekwondo	Boys' 55 kg	8 October
Gold	Andrei Minakov	Swimming	Boys' 100 m butterfly	9 October
Gold	Vladislav Gerasimenko; Kliment Kolesnikov; Daniil Markov; Andrei Minakov	Swimming	Boys' 4 × 100 m freestyle relay	9 October
Gold	Kliment Kolesnikov	Swimming	Boys' 50 m backstroke	10 October
Gold	Anastasia Makarova	Swimming	Girls' 100 m breaststroke	10 October
Gold	Vladislav Gerasimenko; Kliment Kolesnikov; Daniil Markov; Andrei Minakov	Swimming	Boys' 4 × 100 m medley relay	10 October
Gold	Daria Trubnikova	Gymnastics	Mixed multi-discipline team	10 October
Gold	Andrei Minakov	Swimming	Boys' 50 m butterfly	11 October
Gold	Polina Egorova; Elizaveta Klevanovich; Anastasia Makarova; Daria Vaskina	Swimming	Girls' 4 × 100 m freestyle relay	11 October
Gold	Kliment Kolesnikov	Swimming	Boys' 200 m backstroke	12 October
Gold	Polina Egorova	Swimming	Girls' 100 m butterfly	12 October
Gold	Andrei Minakov	Swimming	Boys' 100 m freestyle	12 October
Gold	Ksenia Klimenko	Gymnastics	Girls' uneven bars	13 October
Gold	Akhmedkhan Tembotov	Wrestling	Boys' freestyle 80 kg	14 October
Gold	Sergei Kozyrev	Wrestling	Boys' freestyle 110 kg	14 October
Gold	Daria Trubnikova	Gymnastics	Girls' individual all-around	16 October
Gold	Maria Bocharova; Maria Voronina	Beach volleyball	Girls' tournament	17 October
Gold	Aleksei Dronov	Boxing	Boys' super heavyweight	17 October
Gold	Anastasiia Shamonova	Boxing	Girls' middleweight	17 October
Gold	Ilia Popov	Boxing	Boys' light welterweight	18 October
Silver	Abrek Naguchev	Judo	Boys' 66 kg	7 October
Silver	Iana Enina	Shooting	Girls' 10 m air pistol	9 October
Silver	Daniil Markov	Swimming	Boys' 50 m freestyle	10 October
Silver	Ksenia Klimenko	Gymnastics	Mixed multi-discipline team	10 October
Silver	Anastasiia Dereviagina	Shooting	Mixed 10 m air rifle	11 October
Silver	Daniil Markov	Swimming	Boys' 50 m butterfly	11 October
Silver	Daria Vaskina	Swimming	Girls' 50 m backstroke	11 October
Silver	Sergey Naidin	Gymnastics	Boys' artistic individual all-around	11 October
Silver	Stepan Starodubtsev	Wrestling	Boys' Greco-Roman 71 kg	12 October
Silver	Polina Egorova; Vladislav Gerasimenko*; Elizaveta Klevanovich*; Kliment Kolesnikov; Anastasia Makarova; Daniil Markov*; Andrei Minakov	Swimming	Mixed 4 × 100 m medley relay	12 October
Silver	Sergey Naidin	Gymnastics	Boys' pommel horse	13 October
Silver	Violetta Ignatyeva	Athletics	Girls' discus throw	14 October
Silver	Egor Gromadskii	Modern pentathlon	Boys' individual	14 October
Silver	Nikita Remizov	Basketball	Boys' dunk contest	15 October
Silver	Mariya Kochanova	Athletics	Girls' high jump	15 October
Silver	Ksenia Klimenko	Gymnastics	Girls' balance beam	15 October
Silver	Uliana Kliueva	Diving	Girls' 3 m springboard	15 October
Silver	Anna Chernysheva	Karate	Girls' 59 kg	17 October
Silver	Kamil Gereikhanov; Pavel Karpov; Danil Karpiuk; Maxim Okulov; Danil Samusenko; Denis Subbotin; Pavel Sysoliatin; Ilia Fedorov; Igor Cherniavskii; Kirill Iarullin	Futsal	Boys' tournament	18 October
Silver	Ruslan Kolesnikov	Boxing	Boys' light heavyweight	18 October
Bronze	Polina Egorova; Elizaveta Klevanovich; Anastasia Makarova; Daria Vaskina	Swimming	Girls' 4 × 100 m medley relay	8 October
Bronze	Abrek Naguchev	Judo	Mixed team	10 October
Bronze	Polina Egorova	Swimming	Girls' 50 m butterfly	10 October
Bronze	Sergey Chernyshyov	Dancesport	Mixed team	11 October
Bronze	Kristina Adebaio	Taekwondo	Girls' +63 kg	11 October
Bronze	Yana Reznikova	Sailing	Girls' Techno 293+	12 October
Bronze	Mukhammad Evloev	Wrestling	Boys' Greco-Roman 92 kg	12 October
Bronze	Sergey Naidin	Gymnastics	Boys' floor	13 October
Bronze	Ruslan Ternovoi	Diving	Boys' 3 m springboard	14 October
Bronze	Vera Beliankina	Gymnastics	Girls' trampoline	14 October
Bronze	Sergey Naidin	Gymnastics	Boys' parallel bars	15 October
Bronze	Dmitriy Kachanov	Athletics	Boys' pole vault	16 October
Bronze	Mariya Privalova	Athletics	Girls' triple jump	16 October
Bronze	Ruslan Ternovoi	Diving	Boys' 10m platform	16 October
Bronze	Ruslan Ternovoi	Diving	Mixed team	17 October

Medals by sport
Sport	1st place, gold medalist(s)	2nd place, silver medalist(s)	3rd place, bronze medalist(s)	Total
Swimming	13	4	2	19
Taekwondo	4	0	1	5
Boxing	3	1	0	4
Gymnastics	2	3	3	8
Wrestling	2	1	1	4
Judo	1	1	0	2
Shooting	1	1	0	2
Beach volleyball	1	0	0	1
Cycling	1	0	0	1
Dancesport	1	0	0	1
Athletics	0	2	2	4
Diving	0	1	2	3
Basketball	0	1	0	1
Futsal	0	1	0	1
Karate	0	1	0	1
Modern pentathlon	0	1	0	1
Sailing	0	0	1	1
Total	29	18	12	59

Medals by date
Day	Date	1st place, gold medalist(s)	2nd place, silver medalist(s)	3rd place, bronze medalist(s)	Total
Day 1	7 October	5	1	0	6
Day 2	8 October	6	0	1	7
Day 3	9 October	2	1	0	3
Day 4	10 October	3	1	1	5
Day 5	11 October	2	3	1	6
Day 6	12 October	3	2	2	7
Day 7	13 October	1	1	1	3
Day 8	14 October	2	2	2	6
Day 9	15 October	0	4	1	5
Day 10	16 October	1	0	3	4
Day 11	17 October	3	1	0	4
Day 12	18 October	1	2	0	3
Total		29	18	12	59

== Competitors ==
The following is the list of number of competitors that could participate at the Games per sport/discipline.

Sport	Boys	Girls	Total
Archery	1	1	2
Athletics	1	3	4
Basketball	4	0	4
Beach handball	0	9	9
Beach volleyball	2	2	4
Boxing	3	1	4
Cycling	4	4	8
Dancesport	1	1	2
Diving	1	1	2
Fencing	1	2	3
Futsal	10	0	10
Gymnastics	2	4	6
Judo	1	1	2
Karate	1	1	2
Modern pentathlon	1	1	2
Sailing	1	1	2
Shooting	1	2	3
Sport climbing	0	2	2
Swimming	4	4	8
Table tennis	1	1	2
Taekwondo	2	3	5
Tennis	0	2	2
Triathlon	0	1	1
Wrestling	4	0	4
Total	46	47	93

== Archery ==
Russia qualified two archers based on its performance at the 2017 World Archery Youth Championships.

Athlete	Event	Ranking round		Round of 32	Round of 16	Quarterfinals	Semifinals	Final / BM	
Athlete	Event	Score	Seed	Opposition Score	Opposition Score	Opposition Score	Opposition Score	Opposition Score	Rank
Stanislav Cheremiskin	Boys' individual	678	7	Mustafin (KAZ); W 6–2	Shabani (IRN); L 4–6	Did not advance			
Viktoria Kharitonova	Girls' individual	658	8	Caetano (BRA); W 6–4	Hnin (MYA); L 5–6	Did not advance			
Viktoria Kharitonova; Md Ibrahim Sheik Rezowan (BAN)	Mixed team	1305	3	Uehara (JPN); Juhel (MRI); W 5–4	Naumova (UKR); Eyeni (IRL); W 5–4	Touraine-Hélias (FRA); Solera (ESP); L 1–5	Did not advance		
Laura van der Winkel (NED); Stanislav Cheremiskin	Mixed team	1301	8	Son (KOR); Thompson (GBR); W 6–2	Satır (TUR); Akash (IND); L 2–6	Did not advance			

== Athletics ==
Boys
Field events

Athlete	Event	Stage 1		Stage 2		Total	
Athlete	Event	Distance	Rank	Distance	Rank	Distance	Rank
Dmitriy Kachanov	Pole vault	5.20	1	5.12	3	10.32	3rd place, bronze medalist(s)

Girls
Field events

Athlete	Event	Stage 1		Stage 2		Total	
Athlete	Event	Distance	Rank	Distance	Rank	Distance	Rank
Mariya Kochanova	High jump	1.84	2	1.87	2	3.71	2nd place, silver medalist(s)
Mariya Privalova	Triple jump	13.04	3	13.03	3	26.07	3rd place, bronze medalist(s)
Violetta Ignatyeva	Discus throw	53.47	2	54.32	2	107.79	2nd place, silver medalist(s)

== Basketball ==
Russia qualified a boys' team based on the U18 3x3 National Federation Ranking.

Team roster

- Vasilii Berdnikov
- Khasan Kipkeev
- Nikita Remizov
- Timur Vagapov

Boys' tournament

Event	Group stage					Quarterfinals	Semifinals	Final / BM	
Event	Opposition Score	Opposition Score	Opposition Score	Opposition Score	Rank	Opposition Score	Opposition Score	Opposition Score	Rank
Boys' tournament	United States; W 18–16	Argentina; L 14–21	Mongolia; W 19–12	Estonia; W 22–21	2 Q	Slovenia; L 14–15	Did not advance		

Dunk contest

Athlete	Event	Qualification				Semifinal				Final				
Athlete	Event	Round 1	Round 2	Total	Rank	Round 1	Round 2	Total	Rank	Round 1	Round 2	Round 3	Total	Rank
Nikita Remizov	Dunk contest	24	26	50	2 Q	24	27	51	1 Q	27	27	27	81	2nd place, silver medalist(s)

== Beach handball ==
Team roster

- Victoria Davydova
- Kristina Grigorovskaya
- Anna Ivanova
- Ekaterina Karabutova
- Ekaterina Karpova
- Sofia Krakhmaleva
- Sofya Savina
- Anastasia Skripka
- Anna Volkova

Girls' tournament

Event	Preliminary round						Main round / Consolidation round				Semifinals	Final / BM / PM	
Event	Opposition Score	Opposition Score	Opposition Score	Opposition Score	Opposition Score	Rank	Opposition Score	Opposition Score	Opposition Score	Rank	Opposition Score	Opposition Score	Rank
Girls' tournament	Chinese Taipei; L 1–2	Croatia; L 0–2	Hungary; L 1–2	American Samoa; W 2–0	Mauritius; W 2–0	4	Hong Kong; W 2–0	Turkey; W 2–0	Venezuela; W 2–0	1	—N/a	Venezuela; W 2–0	7

== Beach volleyball ==
Russia qualified a boys' and girls' team based on their performance at 2017-18 European Youth Continental Cup Final.

Athletes	Event	Preliminary round		Round of 24	Round of 16	Quarterfinals	Semifinals	Final / BM	
Athletes	Event	Opposition Score	Rank	Opposition Score	Opposition Score	Opposition Score	Opposition Score	Opposition Score	Rank
Denis Shekunov; Dmitrii Veretiuk	Boys'	Poznański–Miszczuk (POL) W 2–0; Jeffrey–Joe (NZL) W 2–0; Lammel–Droguett (CHI) W 2–0	1 Q	Bye	Ayón– Alayo (CUB); L 1–2	Did not advance			
Maria Bocharova; Maria Voronina	Girls'	Roskic–Vermette (CAN) W 2–0; Burton–Lockhart (DMA) W 2–0; Dos Santos–Galil (BRA) W 2–0	1 Q	Bye	Van Driel– Schoon (NED); W 2–1	Navas– González (PUR); W 2–0	Olimstad– Berntsen (NOR); W 2–0	Scampoli– Bertozzi (ITA); W 2–0	1st place, gold medalist(s)

== Boxing ==
Boys

Athlete	Event	Preliminary		Semifinals	Final / BM / PM	
Athlete	Event	Round 1	Round 2	Semifinals	Final / BM / PM	
Athlete	Event	Opposition Result	Opposition Result	Opposition Result	Opposition Result	Rank
Ilia Popov	-64 kg	Bye	Jones (USA); W 3–2	Azim (GBR); W 4–1	Shaiken (KAZ); W 4–1	1st place, gold medalist(s)
Ruslan Kolesnikov	-81 kg	Bye	Mousavi paeindezaei (IRI); W KO	Merjanov (UZB); W 5–0	Itauma (GBR); L 1–4	2nd place, silver medalist(s)
Aleksei Dronov	+91 kg	Bye	Dennis (AUS); W 5–0	Elsawy (EGY); W 5–0	Toibay (KAZ); W 4–1	1st place, gold medalist(s)

Girls

Athlete	Event	Preliminary	Semifinals	Final / BM	
Athlete	Event	Opposition Result	Opposition Result	Opposition Result	Rank
Anastasiia Shamonova	-75 kg	Kelly (IRL); W 5–0	Ryabets (KAZ); W 5–0	Brillaux (FRA); W 3–2	1st place, gold medalist(s)

== Cycling ==
Russia qualified a boys' and girls' combined team based on its ranking in the Youth Olympic Games Junior Nation Rankings. They also qualified a mixed BMX racing team based on its ranking in the Youth Olympic Games BMX Junior Nation Rankings and two athletes in BMX freestyle based on its performance at the 2018 Urban Cycling World Championship.

Combined team

Athlete	Event	Time trial			Road race			Cross-country Eliminator		Cross-country Short circuit		Criterium		Total points	Rank
Athlete	Event	Time	Rank	Points	Time	Rank	Points	Rank	Points	Rank	Points	Rank	Points	Total points	Rank
Maksim Artemev	Boys' combined team	9:21.03	18	0	1:31:03	30	0	27	0		0	21	0	1	20
Nikolay Ivanov	Boys' combined team	9:21.03	18	0	1:31:40	34	0	25	0	16	1	28	0	1	20
Darya Alexeeva	Girls' combined team	9:52.87	6	30	1:42:54	31	0	6	30		0	23	0	196	5
Aigul Gareeva	Girls' combined team	9:52.87	6	30	1:42:19	4	50	12	6	6	30	4	50	196	5

BMX freestyle park

Athlete	Event	Seeding				Qualification				Final / Small final					Total points	Rank
Athlete	Event	Run 1	Run 2	Score	Seed	Run 1	Run 2	Score	Rank	Run 1	Run 2	Score	Rank	Points	Total points	Rank
Alexander Kim	Mixed BMX freestyle park	72.33	66.66	69.49	3	58.33	67.16	62.74	5 q	48.66	65.00	65.00	7	2	8	5
Valeriia Pinkina	Mixed BMX freestyle park	59.66	59.33	59.49	4	60.00	61.33	60.66	4 Q	62.33	58.66	62.33	4	6	8	5

BMX racing

Athlete	Event	Semifinal		Final			Total points	Rank
Athlete	Event	Points	Rank	Result	Rank	Points	Total points	Rank
Ilia Beskrovnyy	Mixed BMX racing	6	1 Q	35.173	2	80	160	1st place, gold medalist(s)
Varvara Ovchinnikova	Mixed BMX racing	5	1 Q	38.955	2	80	160	1st place, gold medalist(s)

== Dancesport ==
Russia qualified two dancers based on its performance at the 2018 World Youth Breaking Championship.

Athlete	Event	Preliminary				Quarterfinals	Semifinals	Final / BB	
Athlete	Event	Opposition Score	Opposition Score	Opposition Score	Rank	Opposition Score	Opposition Score	Opposition Score	Rank
Sergey Chernyshyov (Bumblebee)	B-Boys'	Axel (POL); 1–1	KennyG (TPE); 2–0	Broly (ARG); 2–0	3 Q	D-Matt (CAN); W 4–0	Shigekix (JPN); W 3–1	Martin (FRA); W 4–0	1st place, gold medalist(s)
Kristina Yashina (Matina)	B-Girls'	Lexy (ITA); 2–0	Ivy (CYP); 2–0	Ella (AUT); 2–0	2 Q	Lexy (ITA); W 3–1	Emma (CAN); L 2–2	Yell (KOR); L 1–3	4
Ella (AUT); Bumblebee	Mixed team	Lexy (ITA); Broly (ARG); 1–1	Ivy (CYP); D-Matt (CAN); 2–0	Ram (JPN); B4 (VIE); 1–1	5 Q	Yell (KOR); Jordan (RSA); W 3–2	Lexy (ITA); Broly (ARG); L 2–2	Vicky (NED); Bad Matty (ITA); W 2–2	3rd place, bronze medalist(s)
Matina; Reflow (BEL)	Mixed team	Yell (KOR); Jordan (RSA); 0–2	Anastasia (LAT); Shigekix (JPN); 0–2	Vale (ARG); Axel (POL); 1–1	10	Did not advance			

== Diving ==
Athlete	Event	Preliminary		Final	
Athlete	Event	Points	Rank	Points	Rank
Ruslan Ternovoi	Boys' 3 m springboard	486.65	9 Q	551.20	3rd place, bronze medalist(s)
Ruslan Ternovoi	Boys' 10 m platform	524.05	3 Q	596.85	3rd place, bronze medalist(s)
Uliana Kliueva	Girls' 3 m springboard	442.05	2 Q	445.05	2nd place, silver medalist(s)
Sofiya Lyskun (UKR); Ruslan Ternovoi	Mixed team	—N/a		371.15	3rd place, bronze medalist(s)
Uliana Kliueva; Aurelian Dragomir (ROU)	Mixed team	—N/a		310.20	9

== Fencing ==
Russia qualified three athletes based on its performance at the 2018 Cadet World Championship.

Boys

Athlete	Event	Pool round		Round of 16	Quarterfinals	Semifinals	Final / BM	
Athlete	Event	Opposition Score	Seed	Opposition Score	Opposition Score	Opposition Score	Opposition Score	Rank
Artur Tolasov	Épée	Veltrup (GER) L 3–4; Pérez (ARG) W 5–1; Asami (JPN) L 1–5; Baudunov (KGZ) W 5–4; Jarov (CAN) W 5–2	6	Pérez (ARG); W 15–4	Elsayed (EGY); L 8–15	Did not advance		

Girls

Athlete	Event	Pool round		Round of 16	Quarterfinals	Semifinals	Final / BM	
Athlete	Event	Opposition Score	Seed	Opposition Score	Opposition Score	Opposition Score	Opposition Score	Rank
Iana Bekmurzova	Épée	Dékány (HUN) L 4–5; Leonard (CAN) L 3–5; Zeboudj (ALG) W 5–3; Vermeule (USA) W 5–3; Jaoude (LBN) W 5–2; Muridova (KAZ) W 5–4	7	Lim (KOR); L 8–15	Did not advance			
Alina Klyuchnikova	Sabre	Corteyn (BEL) L 2–5; Lee (KOR) L 2–5; Botello (MEX) L 0–5; Benadouda (ALG) W 5–2; Ma (HKG) W 5–1	8	Ma (HKG); W 15–11	Botello (MEX); L 9–15	Did not advance		

== Futsal ==
Summary

Team	Event	Group stage					Semifinals	Final / BM	
Team	Event	Opposition Score	Opposition Score	Opposition Score	Opposition Score	Rank	Opposition Score	Opposition Score	Rank
Russia U18	Boys' tournament	Costa Rica; W 6–1	Brazil; L 1–6	Solomon Islands; W 10–4	Iran; W 2–1	2 Q	Egypt; W 3–1	Brazil; L 1–4	2nd place, silver medalist(s)

Team roster

Head coach: Sergei Skorovich

No.	Pos.	Player	Date of birth (age)	Club
1	GK	Kirill Iarullin	23 February 2001 (aged 17)	(Russian Football Union) Sinara Yekaterinburg
2	GK	Denis Subbotin	2 April 2002 (aged 16)	(Russian Football Union) Tyumen
3	FW	Ilia Fedorov	25 July 2001 (aged 17)	(Russian Football Union) Krasnaya Gvardiya
4	FW	Danil Karpiuk	3 September 2000 (aged 18)	(Russian Football Union) Dinamo Moskva
5	FW	Pavel Karpov	6 April 2000 (aged 18)	(Russian Football Union) Sinara Yekaterinburg
6	FW	Pavel Sysoliatin	27 January 2000 (aged 18)	(Russian Football Union) Sinara Yekaterinburg
7	FW	Igor Cherniavskii	2 July 2000 (aged 18)	(Russian Football Union) Gazprom-Ugra Yugorsk
8	FW	Maxim Okulov	11 May 2000 (aged 18)	(Russian Football Union) Sinara Yekaterinburg
9	FW	Danil Samusenko	9 January 2000 (aged 18)	(Russian Football Union) PMFK Sibiryak
10	FW	Kamil Gereikhanov	7 September 2000 (aged 18)	(Russian Football Union) Tyumen

Group stage

Pos	Team	Pld	W	D	L	GF	GA	GD	Pts	Qualification
1	Brazil	4	4	0	0	25	4	+21	12	Semi-finals
2	Russia	4	3	0	1	19	12	+7	9	Semi-finals
3	Iran	4	2	0	2	19	11	+8	6	
4	Costa Rica	4	1	0	3	17	27	−10	3	
5	Solomon Islands	4	0	0	4	13	39	−26	0	

Source: FIFA IOC
7 October 2018
18:00

Costa Rica	1–6	Russia
Corrales 27'	Report (FIFA); Report (IOC)	Sysoliatin 2'; Karpiuk 5', 15'; Fedorov 10', 31'; Subbotin 33'

CeNARD
Attendance: 0
Referee: David Urdánoz (Spain)

8 October 2018
18:00

Russia	1–6	Brazil
Fedorov 37'	Report (FIFA); Report (IOC) Category:Futsal at the 2018 Summer Youth Olympics – Boys First Round – RUS-BRA on Wikimedia Commons	Neguinho 13', 39'; Breno 21'; Wesley 23'; Yuri 24' (pen.); Guilhermão 39'

Tecnópolis
Attendance: 1,250
Referee: Mohamed Hassan (Egypt)

10 October 2018
20:00

Russia	10–4	Solomon Islands
Karpiuk 1', 12', 13'; Sysoliatin 10'; Okulov 12', 39'; Karpov 14'; Fedorov 19'; Gereikhanov 28'; Samusenko 34'	Report (FIFA); Report (IOC)	Lea'i 18', 22', 29', 38'

CeNARD
Attendance: 576
Referee: Chiara Perona (Italy)

12 October 2018
18:00

Iran	1–2	Russia
Alizadeh 31'	Report (FIFA); Report (IOC)	Karpiuk 32' (pen.); Fedorov 38'

Tecnópolis
Attendance: 6,100
Referee: Hiroyuki Kobayashi (Japan)

Semifinal

15 October 2018
18:00

Egypt	1–3	Russia
El-Sayed 10'	Report (FIFA); Report (IOC) Category:Futsal at the 2018 Summer Youth Olympics – Boys Semifinals – EGY-RUS on Wikimedia Commons	Cherniavskii 3'; Okulov 4'; Karpiuk 20'

Tecnópolis
Attendance: 6,500
Referee: Khalid Hnich (Morocco)

Final

18 October 2018
13:00

Brazil	4–1	Russia
Karpiuk 1' (o.g.); Breno 20'; Moura 28'; Françoar 39'	Report (FIFA); Report (IOC) Category:Futsal at the 2018 Summer Youth Olympics – Boys Final on Wikimedia Commons	Samusenko 38'

Tecnópolis
Attendance: 3,400
Referee: Mohamed Hassan (Egypt)

== Gymnastics ==
=== Acrobatic ===
Russia qualified a mixed pair based on its performance at the 2018 Acrobatic Gymnastics World Championship.

Athlete	Event	Qualification					Final	
Athlete	Event	Balance	Dynamic	Combined	Total	Rank	Total	Rank
Kapitolina Khusnullina; Anatolii Slivkov	Mixed pairs	27.350	27.040	26.600	80.990	5 Q	27.200	5

=== Artistic ===
Russia qualified two gymnasts based on its performance at the 2018 European Junior Championship.

Boys

Athlete	Event	Apparatus						Total	Rank
Athlete	Event	F	PH	R	V	PB	HB	Total	Rank
Sergey Naidin	Qualification	13.800 Q	13.666 Q	12.866	13.883	13.933 Q	13.300 Q	81.448 Q	2
Sergey Naidin	All-around	13.500	13.500	12.766	14.066	13.666	13.000	80.498	2nd place, silver medalist(s)
Sergey Naidin	Floor	13.566	—N/a					13.566	3rd place, bronze medalist(s)
Sergey Naidin	Pommel horse	—N/a	13.500	—N/a				13.500	2nd place, silver medalist(s)
Sergey Naidin	Parallel bars	—N/a				13.633	—N/a	13.633	3rd place, bronze medalist(s)
Sergey Naidin	Horizontal bar	—N/a					Did not start		

Girls

Athlete	Event	Apparatus				Total	Rank
Athlete	Event	V	UB	BB	F	Total	Rank
Ksenia Klimenko	Qualification	12.100	13.266 Q	13.100 Q	13.033 Q	51.499 Q	5
Ksenia Klimenko	All-around	13.000	13.200	11.966	13.033	51.199	5
Ksenia Klimenko	Uneven bars	—N/a	14.266	—N/a		14.266	1st place, gold medalist(s)
Ksenia Klimenko	Balance beam	—N/a		13.533	—N/a	13.533	2nd place, silver medalist(s)
Ksenia Klimenko	Floor	—N/a			12.000	12.000	7

=== Rhythmic ===
Russia qualified one rhythmic gymnast based on its performance at the European qualification event.

Athlete	Event	Qualification						Final					
Athlete	Event	Hoop	Ball	Clubs	Ribbon	Total	Rank	Hoop	Ball	Clubs	Ribbon	Total	Rank
Daria Trubnikova	All-around	17.900	17.275	17.500	15.900	68.575	1 Q	17.650	17.100	17.900	16.750	69.400	1st place, gold medalist(s)

=== Trampoline ===
Russia qualified one gymnast based on its performance at the 2018 European Junior Championship.

Athlete	Event	Qualification				Final	
Athlete	Event	Routine 1	Routine 2	Total	Rank	Score	Rank
Vera Beliankina	Girls	43.470	49.825	93.295	5 Q	51.435	3rd place, bronze medalist(s)

=== Multidiscipline ===
Team	Athlete	Acrobatic	Artistic	Rhythmic	Trampoline	Total points	Rank
Team Simone Biles (Orange)	Mariela Kostadinova (BUL); Panayot Dimitrov (BUL)	10	—N/a			293	1st place, gold medalist(s)
Team Simone Biles (Orange)	Ruan Lange (RSA)	—N/a	17	—N/a		293	1st place, gold medalist(s)
Team Simone Biles (Orange)	Krisztián Balázs (HUN)	—N/a	34	—N/a		293	1st place, gold medalist(s)
Team Simone Biles (Orange)	Nazar Chepurnyi (UKR)	—N/a	70	—N/a		293	1st place, gold medalist(s)
Team Simone Biles (Orange)	Tamara Ong (SGP)	—N/a	38	—N/a		293	1st place, gold medalist(s)
Team Simone Biles (Orange)	Phạm Như Phương (VIE)	—N/a	48	—N/a		293	1st place, gold medalist(s)
Team Simone Biles (Orange)	Alba Petisco (ESP)	—N/a	40	—N/a		293	1st place, gold medalist(s)
Team Simone Biles (Orange)	Talisa Torretti (ITA)	—N/a		13	—N/a	293	1st place, gold medalist(s)
Team Simone Biles (Orange)	Daria Trubnikova	—N/a		4	—N/a	293	1st place, gold medalist(s)
Team Simone Biles (Orange)	Yelyzaveta Luzan (AZE)	—N/a		–	—N/a	293	1st place, gold medalist(s)
Team Simone Biles (Orange)	Liam Christie (AUS)	—N/a			17	293	1st place, gold medalist(s)
Team Simone Biles (Orange)	Fan Xiny (CHN)	—N/a			2	293	1st place, gold medalist(s)
Team Max Whitlock (Green)	Madalena Cavilhas (POR); Manuel Candeias (POR)	20	—N/a			349	2nd place, silver medalist(s)
Team Max Whitlock (Green)	Fernando Espíndola (ARG)	—N/a	43	—N/a		349	2nd place, silver medalist(s)
Team Max Whitlock (Green)	Takeru Kitazono (JPN)	—N/a	17	—N/a		349	2nd place, silver medalist(s)
Team Max Whitlock (Green)	Pablo Calvache (ECU)	—N/a	59	—N/a		349	2nd place, silver medalist(s)
Team Max Whitlock (Green)	Camila Montoya (CRC)	—N/a	69	—N/a		349	2nd place, silver medalist(s)
Team Max Whitlock (Green)	Ksenia Klimenko	—N/a	11	—N/a		349	2nd place, silver medalist(s)
Team Max Whitlock (Green)	Zeina Ibrahim (EGY)	—N/a	15	—N/a		349	2nd place, silver medalist(s)
Team Max Whitlock (Green)	Rayna Khai Ling Hoh (MAS)	—N/a		18	—N/a	349	2nd place, silver medalist(s)
Team Max Whitlock (Green)	Roza Abitova (KAZ)	—N/a		26	—N/a	349	2nd place, silver medalist(s)
Team Max Whitlock (Green)	Adelina Beljajeva (EST)	—N/a		47	—N/a	349	2nd place, silver medalist(s)
Team Max Whitlock (Green)	Robert Vilarasau (ESP)	—N/a			11	349	2nd place, silver medalist(s)
Team Max Whitlock (Green)	Jessica Clarke (GBR)	—N/a			13	349	2nd place, silver medalist(s)
Team Anna Bessonova (Gray)	Sophia Imrie-Gale (GBR); Clyde Gembickas (GBR)	15	—N/a			381	4
Team Anna Bessonova (Gray)	Ward Claeys (BEL)	—N/a	99	—N/a		381	4
Team Anna Bessonova (Gray)	Reza Bohloulzade Hajlari (IRI)	—N/a	65	—N/a		381	4
Team Anna Bessonova (Gray)	Ayan Moldagaliyev (KAZ)	—N/a	36	—N/a		381	4
Team Anna Bessonova (Gray)	Eglė Stalinkevičiūtė (LTU)	—N/a	42	—N/a		381	4
Team Anna Bessonova (Gray)	Ada Hautala (FIN)	—N/a	10	—N/a		381	4
Team Anna Bessonova (Gray)	Giorgia Villa (ITA)	—N/a	11	—N/a		381	4
Team Anna Bessonova (Gray)	Célia Joseph-Noël (FRA)	—N/a		40	—N/a	381	4
Team Anna Bessonova (Gray)	Celeste D'Arcángelo (ARG)	—N/a		13	—N/a	381	4
Team Anna Bessonova (Gray)	Tatyana Volozhanina (BUL)	—N/a		26	—N/a	381	4
Team Anna Bessonova (Gray)	Jérémy Chartier (CAN)	—N/a			15	381	4
Team Anna Bessonova (Gray)	Vera Beliankina	—N/a			9	381	4
Team Alina Kabaeva (White)	Kapitolina Khusnullina; Anatolii Slivkov	17	—N/a			397	6
Team Alina Kabaeva (White)	Jacob Karlsen (NOR)	—N/a	81	—N/a		397	6
Team Alina Kabaeva (White)	Samad Mammadli (AZE)	—N/a	49	—N/a		397	6
Team Alina Kabaeva (White)	Yeh Cheng (TPE)	—N/a	45	—N/a		397	6
Team Alina Kabaeva (White)	Paulina Vargas (MEX)	—N/a	47	—N/a		397	6
Team Alina Kabaeva (White)	Laura Leonardo (BRA)	—N/a	31	—N/a		397	6
Team Alina Kabaeva (White)	Chiharu Yamada (JPN)	—N/a	34	—N/a		397	6
Team Alina Kabaeva (White)	Elizabeth Kapitonova (USA)	—N/a		20	—N/a	397	6
Team Alina Kabaeva (White)	Kim Mun-ye (PRK)	—N/a		25	—N/a	397	6
Team Alina Kabaeva (White)	Yulia Vodopyanova (ARM)	—N/a		33	—N/a	397	6
Team Alina Kabaeva (White)	Ruben Tavares (POR)	—N/a			5	397	6
Team Alina Kabaeva (White)	Marina Chavarria (ESP)	—N/a			10	397	6
Team Nadia Comăneci (Yellow)	Anastassiya Arkhipova (KAZ); Dmitriy Nemerenko (KAZ)	15	—N/a			410	9
Team Nadia Comăneci (Yellow)	Uri Zeidel (ISR)	—N/a	105	—N/a		410	9
Team Nadia Comăneci (Yellow)	Sergey Naidin	—N/a	31	—N/a		410	9
Team Nadia Comăneci (Yellow)	Mathys Cordule (FRA)	—N/a	21	—N/a		410	9
Team Nadia Comăneci (Yellow)	Zarith Imaan Khalid (MAS)	—N/a	41	—N/a		410	9
Team Nadia Comăneci (Yellow)	Lisa Zimmermann (GER)	—N/a	36	—N/a		410	9
Team Nadia Comăneci (Yellow)	Milka Dona (SRI)	—N/a	33	—N/a		410	9
Team Nadia Comăneci (Yellow)	Natalie Garcia (CAN)	—N/a		19	—N/a	410	9
Team Nadia Comăneci (Yellow)	Ioanna Magopoulou (GRE)	—N/a		28	—N/a	410	9
Team Nadia Comăneci (Yellow)	Ketevan Arbolishvili (GEO)	—N/a		42	—N/a	410	9
Team Nadia Comăneci (Yellow)	Takumi Fujimoto (JPN)	—N/a			20	410	9
Team Nadia Comăneci (Yellow)	Michelle Mares (MEX)	—N/a			19	410	9

== Judo ==
Individual

Athlete	Event	Round of 16	Quarterfinals	Semifinals	Rep 1	Rep 2	Rep 3	Final / BM	
Athlete	Event	Opposition Result	Opposition Result	Opposition Result	Opposition Result	Opposition Result	Opposition Result	Opposition Result	Rank
Abrek Naguchev	Boys' -66 kg	Zulu (ZAM); W 10–00	Djoukaev (FIN); W 10–00s3	Pena Insausti (ESP); W 10s1–00	Bye			Talibov (AZE); L 00–10	2nd place, silver medalist(s)
Irena Khubulova	Girls' -52 kg	Bye	Rzal (MAR); W 10–00s1	Toniolo (ITA); W 10–00	Bye			Lkhagvasuren (MGL); W 10–00	1st place, gold medalist(s)

Team

Athletes	Event	Round of 16	Quarterfinals	Semifinals	Final	
Athletes	Event	Opposition Result	Opposition Result	Opposition Result	Opposition Result	Rank
Team Rio de Janeiro; Milana Charygulyyeva (TKM); Yassamine Djellab (ALG); Metka Lobnik (SLO); Erza Muminoviq (KOS); Abrek Naguchev; Fleury Nihozeko (BUR); Jamshed Sulaimoni (TJK); Sultan Zhenishbekov (KGZ)	Mixed team	Team Sydney (MIX); W 4–3	Team Atlanta (MIX); W 5–4	Team Athens (MIX); L 3–5	Did not advance	3rd place, bronze medalist(s)
Team Sydney; Ömer Aydın (TUR); Fatime Barka Segue (CHA); Giorgia Hagianu (ROU); Irena Khubulova; Euclides Lopes (GBS); Shakhida Narmukhamedova (KGZ); Keagan Young (CAN); Simon Zulu (ZAM)	Mixed team	Team Rio de Janeiro (MIX); L 3–4	Did not advance			

== Karate ==
Russia qualified two athletes based on its performance at one of the Karate Qualification Tournaments.

Athlete	Event	Elimination round				Semifinals	Final	
Athlete	Event	Opposition Score	Opposition Score	Opposition Score	Rank	Opposition Score	Opposition Score	Rank
Robert Avakimov	Boys' +68 kg	Ech-Chaabi (MAR); L 0–8	Bulut (TUR); L 0–7	Jefferies (NZL); W 4–1	3	Did not advance		
Anna Chernysheva	Girls' –59 kg	Oukhattou (FRA); W 8–0	Hope (GBR); W 4–0	Heidari (IRI); W 8–0	1 Q	Perović (SRB); W 0–0	Sakaji (JPN); L 0–3	2nd place, silver medalist(s)

== Modern pentathlon ==
Russia qualified one pentathlete based on its performance at the European Youth Olympic Games Qualifier.

Athlete	Event	Fencing Ranking round (épée one touch)			Swimming (200 m freestyle)			Fencing Bonus round (épée one touch)		Combined: Shooting / Running (10 m air pistol) / (3200 m)			Total points	Final rank
Athlete	Event	Results	Rank	Points	Time	Rank	Points	Results	Points	Time	Rank	Points	Total points	Final rank
Egor Gromadskii	Boys' individual	18–5	1	266	2:06.21	6	298	0–1	0	11:45.90	10	595	1159	2nd place, silver medalist(s)
Viktoriia Novikova	Girls' individual	6–17	23	170	2:27.25	15	256	0–1	0	12:49.10	7	531	957	15
Sofya Prizhennikova (KAZ); Egor Gromadskii	Mixed relay	8–14; 9–13	20	180	Did not start									
Viktoriia Novikova; Yevhen Ziborov (UKR)	Mixed relay	6–16; 9–13	23	170	2:05.27	16	300	8–1	8	12:20.74	18	560	1038	21

== Sailing ==
Russia qualified female boat based on its performance at the 2017 Techno 293+ World Championship. They later qualified a male boat based on its performance at the Techno 293+ European Qualifier.

Athlete	Event	Race													Net points	Final rank
Athlete	Event	1	2	3	4	5	6	7	8	9	10	11	12	M*	Net points	Final rank
Egor Zhilin	Boys' Techno 293+	6	9	15	9	–	13	11	16	(18)	14	7	10	10	120	11
Yana Reznikova	Girls' Techno 293+	2	3	1	(13)	–	4	2	13	8	6	1	3	3	46	3rd place, bronze medalist(s)

== Shooting ==
Russia qualified two sport shooters based on its performance at the 2017 European Championships. Russia later qualified a female rifle sport shooter based on its performance at the 2018 European Championships.

Individual

Athlete	Event	Qualification		Final	
Athlete	Event	Points	Rank	Points	Rank
Grigorii Shamakov	Boys' 10m air rifle	622.7	5 Q	249.2	1st place, gold medalist(s)
Anastasiia Dereviagina	Girls' 10m air rifle	625.3	3 Q	164.6	6
Iana Enina	Girls' 10m air pistol	569	2 Q	235.9	2nd place, silver medalist(s)

Team

Athletes	Event	Qualification		Round of 16	Quarterfinals	Semifinals	Final / BM	
Athletes	Event	Points	Rank	Opposition Result	Opposition Result	Opposition Result	Opposition Result	Rank
Anastasiia Dereviagina; Edson Ramírez (MEX)	Mixed 10m air rifle	825.1	6 Q	Malić (SRB); Dizdarević (BIH); W 10–4	Rossiter (AUS); Babayan (ARM); W 10–4	Martínez (MEX); Wadlegger (AUT); W 10–8	Erdenechuluun (MGL); Pekler (HUN); L 9–10	2nd place, silver medalist(s)
Zaynab Pardabaeva (UZB); Grigorii Shamakov	Mixed 10m air rifle	827.0	2 Q	Chen (TPE); Sharar (BAN); L 7–10	Did not advance			
Iana Enina; Sebastian Hernández (MEX)	Mixed 10m air pistol	728	19	Did not advance				

== Sport climbing ==
Russia qualified three sport climbers based on its performance at the 2017 World Youth Sport Climbing Championships.

Athlete	Event	Qualification					Final				
Athlete	Event	Speed	Bouldering	Lead	Total	Rank	Speed	Bouldering	Lead	Total	Rank
Luiza Emeleva	Girls' combined	9	8	12	864	14	Did not advance				
Elena Krasovskaia	Girls' combined	3	6	6	108	3 Q	2	6	4	48	5

== Swimming ==
Boys

Athlete	Event	Heats		Semifinals		Final	
Athlete	Event	Time	Rank	Time	Rank	Time	Rank
Vladislav Gerasimenko	50 m breaststroke	29.03	13 Q	28.43	5 Q	28.36	6
Vladislav Gerasimenko	100 m breaststroke	1:02.46	5 Q	1:02.15	6 Q	1:02.43	7
Kliment Kolesnikov	50 m backstroke	24.74	1 Q	24.56	1 Q	24.40	1st place, gold medalist(s)
Kliment Kolesnikov	100 m backstroke	54.26	1 Q	53.80	1 Q	53.26	1st place, gold medalist(s)
Kliment Kolesnikov	200 m backstroke	1:59.86	1 Q	—N/a		1:56.14	1st place, gold medalist(s)
Daniil Markov	50 m freestyle	22.73	2 Q	22.30	1 Q	22.37	2nd place, silver medalist(s)
Daniil Markov	100 m freestyle	50.60	7 Q	Did not start		Did not advance	
Daniil Markov	50 m butterfly	24.00	3 Q	23.77	3 Q	23.63	2nd place, silver medalist(s)
Daniil Markov	100 m butterfly	53.91	10 Q	54.07	13	Did not advance	
Andrei Minakov	100 m freestyle	50.20	4 Q	50.16	4 Q	49.23	1st place, gold medalist(s)
Andrei Minakov	50 m butterfly	23.50	1 Q	23.47	2 Q	23.62	1st place, gold medalist(s)
Andrei Minakov	100 m butterfly	52.47	1 Q	51.94	1 Q	51.12	1st place, gold medalist(s)
Kliment Kolesnikov; Daniil Markov; Vladislav Gerasimenko; Andrei Minakov	4 × 100 m freestyle relay	—N/a				3:18.11	1st place, gold medalist(s)
Kliment Kolesnikov; Vladislav Gerasimenko; Andrei Minakov; Daniil Markov	4 × 100 m medley relay	3:43.50	1 Q	—N/a		3:35.17 WJ	1st place, gold medalist(s)

Girls

Athlete	Event	Heats		Semifinals		Final	
Athlete	Event	Time	Rank	Time	Rank	Time	Rank
Polina Egorova	100 m backstroke	1:01.74	3 Q	1:00.92	1 Q	1:01.25	4
Polina Egorova	200 m backstroke	2:13.89	8 Q	—N/a		2:15.90	8
Polina Egorova	50 m butterfly	27.43	8 Q	26.98	7 Q	26.68	3rd place, bronze medalist(s)
Polina Egorova	100 m butterfly	1:00.23	2 Q	1:00.14	1 Q	59.22	1st place, gold medalist(s)
Elizaveta Klevanovich	50 m freestyle	25.99	8 Q	25.74	8 Q	26.05	8
Elizaveta Klevanovich	100 m freestyle	55.99	5 Q	55.34	5 Q	55.68	6
Elizaveta Klevanovich	200 m freestyle	2:06.08	26	—N/a		Did not advance	
Anastasia Makarova	50 m breaststroke	32.35	11 Q	32.89	14	Did not advance	
Anastasia Makarova	100 m breaststroke	1:08.80	1 Q	1.08.75	1 Q	1.07.88	1st place, gold medalist(s)
Anastasia Makarova	200 m breaststroke	2:30.10	3 Q	—N/a		2:29.03	6
Daria Vaskina	50 m backstroke	28.46	3 Q	28.24	2 Q	28.38	2nd place, silver medalist(s)
Daria Vaskina	100 m backstroke	1:02.05	6 Q	1:01.41	3 Q	1:00.45	1st place, gold medalist(s)
Daria Vaskina	200 m backstroke	2:19.54	22	—N/a		Did not advance	
Elizaveta Klevanovich; Anastasia Makarova; Daria Vaskina; Polina Egorova	4 × 100 m freestyle relay	—N/a				3:45.26	1st place, gold medalist(s)
Daria Vaskina; Anastasia Makarova; Polina Egorova; Elizaveta Klevanovich	4 × 100 m medley relay	—N/a				4:06.07	3rd place, bronze medalist(s)

Mixed

Athlete	Event	Heats		Final	
Athlete	Event	Time	Rank	Time	Rank
Kliment Kolesnikov; Andrei Minakov; Polina Egorova; Elizaveta Klevanovich; Daniil Markov; Vladislav Gerasimenko; Daria Vaskina; Anastasia Makarova	4 × 100 m freestyle relay	3:36.98	8 Q	3:28.50	1st place, gold medalist(s)
Polina Egorova; Anastasia Makarova; Andrei Minakov; Kliment Kolesnikov; Vladislav Gerasimenko; Daniil Markov; Elizaveta Klevanovich	4 × 100 m medley relay	3:54.42	3 Q	3:51.46	2nd place, silver medalist(s)

== Table tennis ==
Russia qualified two table tennis players based on its performance at the European Continental Qualifier.

Athlete	Event	Group stage		Round of 16	Quarterfinals	Semifinals	Final / BM	
Athlete	Event	Opposition Score	Rank	Opposition Score	Opposition Score	Opposition Score	Opposition Score	Rank
Vladimir Sidorenko	Boys' singles	Lin (TPE) L 2–4; Cho (KOR) W 4–1; Panagitgun (THA) W 4–0	2 Q	Wang (CHN); L 2–4	Did not advance			
Mariia Tailakova	Girls' singles	Lee (HKG) W 4–0; Lundström (FIN) W 4–0; Sawettabut (THA) W 4–0	1 Q	Blašková (CZE); W 4–3	Hirano (JPN); L 0–4	Did not advance		
Vladimir Sidorenko; Mariia Tailakova	Mixed team	Latin America–1 (MIX) W 2–1; Intercontinental–3 (MIX) W 2–1; Thailand W 2–1	1 Q	South Korea; W 2–1	China; L 0–2	Did not advance		

== Taekwondo ==
Boys

Athlete	Event	Round of 16	Quarterfinals	Semifinals	Final	
Athlete	Event	Opposition Result	Opposition Result	Opposition Result	Opposition Result	Rank
Dmitrii Shishko	−48 kg	Bye	Teskera (CRO); W 14–7	Jendoubi (TUN); W 14–10	Rashitov (UZB); W 11–8	1st place, gold medalist(s)
Georgy Popov	−55 kg	Bye	Maeda (JPN); W 34–13	Amadou (NIG); W 33–13	Kim (KOR); W 33–26	1st place, gold medalist(s)

Girls

Athlete	Event	Round of 16	Quarterfinals	Semifinals	Final	
Athlete	Event	Opposition Result	Opposition Result	Opposition Result	Opposition Result	Rank
Polina Shcherbakova	−44 kg	Bye	Usmanova (KAZ); W 15–1	Rodríguez (MEX); W 6–3	Kang (KOR); W 12–6	1st place, gold medalist(s)
Elizaveta Ryadninskaya	−49 kg	Bye	Ho (VIE); W 6–5	Cao (CHN); W 6–5	Zolotic (USA); W 17–16	1st place, gold medalist(s)
Kristina Adebaio	+63 kg	—N/a	Arslan (TUR); W 4–2	Hemmati (IRN); L 19–21	Did not advance	3rd place, bronze medalist(s)

== Tennis ==
Athlete	Event	Round of 32	Round of 16	Quarterfinals	Semifinals	Final / BM	
Athlete	Event	Opposition Score	Opposition Score	Opposition Score	Opposition Score	Opposition Score	Rank
Kamilla Rakhimova	Girls' singles	Ma (USA); W 4–6, 6–2, 6–1	Naito (JPN); L 6–7^{(4–7)}, 6–3, 4–6	Did not advance			
Oksana Selekhmeteva	Girls' singles	Sun (SUI); W 7–6^{(7–1)}, 3–6, 6–3	Parry (FRA); W 6–4, 6–2	Juvan (SLO); L 6–1, 5–7, 3–6	Did not advance		
Kamilla Rakhimova; Oksana Selekhmeteva	Girls' doubles	—N/a	Garland (TPE) / Liang (TPE); W 6–0, 6–1	Carlé (ARG) / Osorio (COL); L 5–7, 6–3, [7–10]	Did not advance		
Kamilla Rakhimova; Ondřej Štyler (CZE)	Mixed doubles	Burel (FRA) / Gaston (FRA); L 6–4, 4–6, [8–10]	Did not advance				
Oksana Selekhmeteva; Carlos López Montagud (ESP)	Mixed doubles	Vismane (LAT) / Svrčina (CZE); W 7–5, 4–6, [11–9]	Sato (JPN) / Klier (BRA); W 6–4, 6–7^{(8–10)}, [10–6]	Osorio (COL) / Mejía (COL); L 1–6, 3–6	Did not advance		

== Triathlon ==
Russia qualified one athlete based on its performance at the 2018 European Youth Olympic Games Qualifier.

Individual

Athlete	Event	Swim (750m)	Trans 1	Bike (19.2 km)	Trans 2	Run (5 km)	Total time	Rank
Alevtina Stetsenko	Girls	10:42	0:38	31:23	0:29	18:36	1:01:48	15

Relay

Athlete	Event	Total times per athlete (Swim 300m, Bike 6.4 km, Run 2 km)	Total group time	Rank
Europe 5 Chiara Lobba (ITA); Loïc Triponez (SUI); Alevtina Stetsenko; Itamar Shevach Levanon (ISR)	Mixed relay	24:00; 21:54; 24:26; 21:28	1:31:48	8

== Wrestling ==
Key:

- VFA – Victory by fall.
- VPO – Victory by points – the loser without technical points.
- VPO1 – Victory by points – the loser with technical points.
- VSU – Victory by technical superiority – the loser without technical points and a margin of victory of at least 8 (Greco-Roman) or 10 (freestyle) points.
- VSU1 – Victory by technical superiority – the loser with technical points and a margin of victory of at least 8 (Greco-Roman) or 10 (freestyle) points.

Boys

Athlete	Event	Group stage			Final / BM / RM	
Athlete	Event	Opposition Score	Opposition Score	Rank	Opposition Score	Rank
Akhmedkhan Tembotov	Freestyle -80 kg	Marshall (NZL); W 10–0^{VSU}	Rakhimov (UZB); W 9–0^{VPO}	1	Benferdjallah (ALG); W 10–0^{VSU}	1st place, gold medalist(s)
Sergei Kozyrev	Freestyle -110 kg	Orozco (MEX); W 4–1^{VPO1}	Velinov (MKD); W 4–0^{VFA}	1	Zare (IRI); W 6–5^{VPO1}	1st place, gold medalist(s)
Stepan Starodubtsev	Greco-Roman -71 kg	Yamada (JPN); W 4–2^{VPO1}	Santos (GUM); W 8–0^{VSU}	1	Guţu (MDA); L 0–8^{VFA}	2nd place, silver medalist(s)
Mukhammad Evloev	Greco-Roman -92 kg	Nosrati (IRI); L 3–5^{VPO1}	De Queiroz (BRA); W 7–0^{VPO}	2	Wehib (EGY); W 11–2^{VSU1}	3rd place, bronze medalist(s)
