= Swimming at the 2018 Summer Youth Olympics – Girls' 100 metre breaststroke =

Girls' 100 metre breaststroke at the 2018 Summer Youth Olympics
- Venue: Natatorium
- Dates: 9 October (heats, semifinals); 10 October (final)
- Competitors: 45 from 38 nations
- Winning time: 1:07.88

Medalists
gold medal	Anastasia Makarova	Russia
silver medal	Niamh Coyne	Ireland
bronze medal	Kotryna Teterevkova	Lithuania

The girls' 100 metre breaststroke event at the 2018 Summer Youth Olympics took place on 9 and 10 October at the Natatorium in Buenos Aires, Argentina.

== Results ==
=== Heats ===
The heats were started on 9 October at 10:41.

Rank	Heat	Lane	Name	Nationality	Time	Notes
1	5	5	Anastasia Makarova	Russia	1:08.80	Q
2	6	4	Mona McSharry	Ireland	1:09.24	Q
3	4	3	Shiori Asaba	Japan	1:09.27	Q
4	5	4	Niamh Coyne	Ireland	1:09.49	Q
5	6	3	Anna Pirovano	Italy	1:09.78	Q
6	4	4	Kotryna Teterevkova	Lithuania	1:10.06	Q
7	4	2	Hannah Brunzell	Sweden	1:10.10	Q
8	6	6	Chelsea Hodges	Australia	1:10.37	Q
9	6	5	Weronika Hallmann	Poland	1:10.47	Q
10	4	5	Avery Wiseman	Canada	1:10.63	Q
11	6	2	Elena Guttmann	Austria	1:10.86	Q
12	3	5	Julia Månsson	Sweden	1:10.91	Q
12	4	6	Tina Čelik	Slovenia	1:10.91	Q
14	5	3	Zheng Muyan	China	1:10.94	Q
15	5	6	Agnė Šeleikaitė	Lithuania	1:10.95	Q
16	4	1	Clara Basso-Bert	France	1:11.31	Q
17	2	4	Yun Eun-sol	South Korea	1:11.37	
18	3	3	Anna Kroniger	Germany	1:11.51	
19	3	1	Christie Chue	Singapore	1:11.56	
20	6	8	Christin Mundell	South Africa	1:11.58	
21	5	7	Alba Vázquez	Spain	1:11.69	
22	4	7	Kate Douglass	United States	1:11.77	
23	3	8	Saovanee Boonamphai	Thailand	1:11.82	
24	3	4	Anastasia Moscenscaia	Moldova	1:12.00	
25	4	8	Wang Hee-song	South Korea	1:12.01	
26	3	6	Claudia Maria Gâdea	Romania	1:12.04	
27	5	1	Raquel Pereira	Portugal	1:12.13	
28	2	2	Mila Medić	Serbia	1:12.14	
29	1	5	María Alborzen	Argentina	1:12.23	
30	3	7	Ingrid Huszár	Romania	1:12.36	
31	5	2	Nina Kucheran	Canada	1:12.50	
32	6	7	Ana Vieira	Brazil	1:12.57	
33	1	4	Lea Polonsky	Israel	1:12.69	
34	2	3	Emina Pašukan	Bosnia and Herzegovina	1:12.73	
34	3	2	Laura Lahtinen	Finland	1:12.73	
36	2	7	Elena Onieva Henrich	Switzerland	1:13.00	
37	2	5	Natalie Kan	Hong Kong	1:13.04	
38	2	6	Nika Čulina	Croatia	1:13.18	
39	2	1	Miroslava Záborská	Slovakia	1:13.30	
40	5	8	Gülşen Beste Samancı	Turkey	1:13.39	
41	1	3	Anahi Schreuders	Aruba	1:15.14	
42	2	8	Karen Mist Arngeirsdóttir	Iceland	1:15.43	
43	6	1	Camille Mallet	France	1:16.12	
44	1	6	Bibigul Menlibaeva	Uzbekistan	1:16.75	
45	1	7	Aishath Hulva Khulail	Maldives	1:34.61	
	2	2	Mera Abushammaleh	Palestine	DNS	

=== Semifinals ===
The semifinals were started on 9 October at 18:51.

Rank	Heat	Lane	Name	Nationality	Time	Notes
1	2	4	Anastasia Makarova	Russia	1:08.75	Q
2	1	3	Kotryna Teterevkova	Lithuania	1:08.80	Q
3	1	5	Niamh Coyne	Ireland	1:08.90	Q
4	2	3	Anna Pirovano	Italy	1:09.14	Q
5	2	6	Hannah Brunzell	Sweden	1:09.46	Q
6	2	5	Shiori Asaba	Japan	1:09.50	Q
7	2	8	Agnė Šeleikaitė	Lithuania	1:09.55	Q
8	1	4	Mona McSharry	Ireland	1:09.74	Q
9	2	2	Weronika Hallmann	Poland	1:10.06	
10	2	7	Elena Guttmann	Austria	1:10.43	
11	1	6	Chelsea Hodges	Australia	1:10.59	
12	1	7	Julia Månsson	Sweden	1:10.60	
13	1	2	Avery Wiseman	Canada	1:10.67	
14	2	1	Tina Čelik	Slovenia	1:10.77	
15	1	1	Zheng Muyan	China	1:10.78	
16	1	8	Clara Basso-Bert	France	1:12.71	

=== Final ===
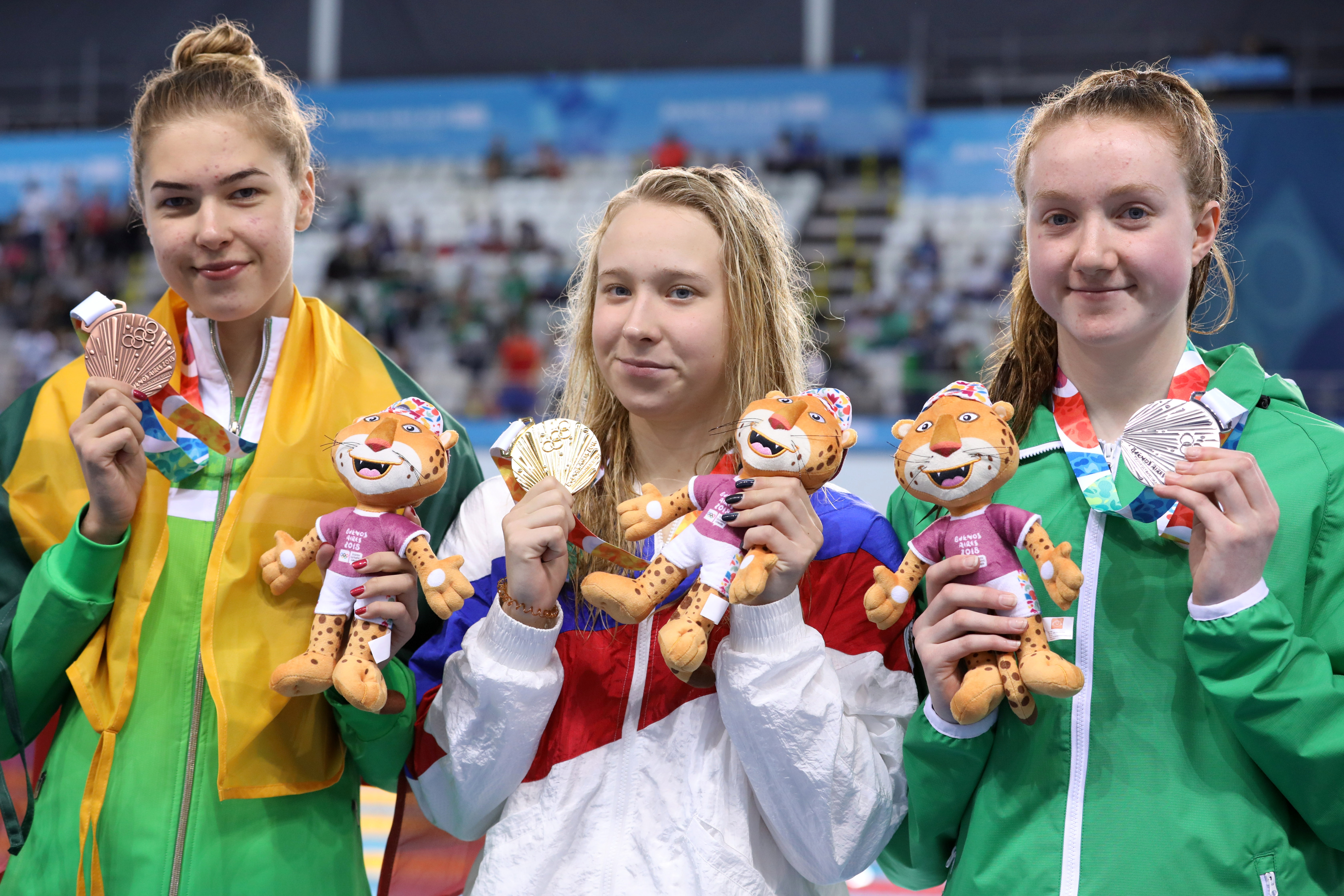
The medailists

The final was held on 10 October at 18:39.

Rank	Lane	Name	Nationality	Time	Notes
1st place, gold medalist(s)	4	Anastasia Makarova	Russia	1:07.88	
2nd place, silver medalist(s)	3	Niamh Coyne	Ireland	1:08.90	
3rd place, bronze medalist(s)	5	Kotryna Teterevkova	Lithuania	1:08.95	
4	8	Mona McSharry	Ireland	1:08.97	
5	6	Anna Pirovano	Italy	1:09.16	
6	2	Hannah Brunzell	Sweden	1:09.20	
7	1	Agnė Šeleikaitė	Lithuania	1:09.40	
8	7	Shiori Asaba	Japan	1:09.57	
