= Swimming at the 2018 Summer Youth Olympics – Girls' 200 metre backstroke =

Girls' 200 metre backstroke at the 2018 Summer Youth Olympics
- Venue: Natatorium
- Dates: 9 October
- Competitors: 26 from 22 nations
- Winning time: 2:10.13

Medalists
gold medal	Tatiana Salcuțan	Moldova
silver medal	Madison Broad	Canada
bronze medal	Kaylee McKeown	Australia

The girls' 200 metre backstroke event at the 2018 Summer Youth Olympics took place on 9 October at the Natatorium in Buenos Aires, Argentina.

== Results ==
=== Heats ===
The heats were started at 11:13.

Rank	Heat	Lane	Name	Nationality	Time	Notes
1	4	6	Rhyan White	United States	2:12.21	Q
2	3	6	Madison Broad	Canada	2:12.94	Q
3	4	4	Peng Xuwei	China	2:13.06	Q
4	4	5	Cristina García	Spain	2:13.25	Q
5	3	4	Kaylee McKeown	Australia	2:13.32	Q
6	3	5	Tatiana Salcuțan	Moldova	2:13.56	Q
7	2	5	Laura Ilyés	Hungary	2:13.83	Q
8	2	4	Polina Egorova	Russia	2:13.89	Q
9	4	1	Anastasia Gorbenko	Israel	2:14.24	
10	4	2	Tamara Frías	Spain	2:15.09	
11	2	6	Fernanda de Goeij	Brazil	2:15.21	
12	4	8	Maria Pessanha	Brazil	2:15.93	
13	4	7	Ingeborg Løyning	Norway	2:16.46	
14	3	2	Aleksa Gold	Estonia	2:17.14	
15	2	2	Cyrielle Duhamel	France	2:17.46	
16	2	7	Anastassiya Rezvantseva	Kazakhstan	2:17.60	
17	2	1	Andrea Hurtado	Peru	2:18.37	
18	2	3	Mariella Venter	South Africa	2:18.70	
19	3	7	Gina Galloway	New Zealand	2:18.72	
20	3	3	Maryna Kolesnykova	Ukraine	2:18.92	
21	3	8	Chen Szu-chi	Chinese Taipei	2:19.23	
22	4	3	Daria Vaskina	Russia	2:19.54	
23	3	1	Lila Touili	France	2:21.15	
24	1	5	Trinidad Ardiles	Chile	2:24.27	
25	1	4	Mia Krstevska	Macedonia	2:27.15	
26	1	3	Claudia Verdino	Monaco	2:30.26	

=== Final ===
The final was held at 18:40.

Rank	Lane	Name	Nationality	Time	Notes
1st place, gold medalist(s)	7	Tatiana Salcuțan	Moldova	2:10.13	
2nd place, silver medalist(s)	5	Madison Broad	Canada	2:10.32	
3rd place, bronze medalist(s)	2	Kaylee McKeown	Australia	2:10.67	
4	4	Rhyan White	United States	2:10.95	
5	3	Peng Xuwei	China	2:11.77	
6	1	Laura Ilyés	Hungary	2:13.05	
7	6	Cristina García	Spain	2:13.07	
8	8	Polina Egorova	Russia	2:15.90	
