= Swimming at the 2018 Summer Youth Olympics – Girls' 4 × 100 metre freestyle relay =

Girls' 4 × 100 metre freestyle relay at the 2018 Summer Youth Olympics
- Venue: Natatorium
- Dates: 11 October
- Competitors: 24 from 6 nations
- Winning time: 3:45.26

Medalists
gold medal	Elizaveta Klevanovich; Anastasia Makarova; Daria Vaskina; Polina Egorova	Russia
silver medal	Rafaela Raurich; Ana Vieira; Maria Pessanha; Fernanda de Goeij	Brazil
bronze medal	Miku Kojima; Mayuka Yamamoto; Nagisa Ikemoto; Shiori Asaba	Japan

The girls' 4 × 100 metre freestyle relay event at the 2018 Summer Youth Olympics took place on 11 October at the Natatorium in Buenos Aires, Argentina.

== Results ==
=== Final ===
The final was held at 19:14.

Rank	Lane	Name	Nationality	Time	Notes
1st place, gold medalist(s)	7	Elizaveta Klevanovich (55.92); Anastasia Makarova (56.84); Daria Vaskina (57.19); Polina Egorova (55.31)	Russia	3:45.26	
2nd place, silver medalist(s)	3	Rafaela Raurich (56.46); Ana Vieira (56.48); Maria Pessanha (56.76); Fernanda de Goeij (57.50)	Brazil	3:47.20	
3rd place, bronze medalist(s)	5	Miku Kojima (57.81); Mayuka Yamamoto (55.67); Nagisa Ikemoto (55.76); Shiori Asaba (1:00.03)	Japan	3:49.27	
4	6	Yang Junxuan (56.00); Peng Xuwei (58.68); Zheng Muyan (1:02.43); Lin Xintong (56.08)	China	3:53.19	
5	2	Kate Douglass (56.65); Ryan White (59.81); Maddie Donohoe (58.60); Kaitlynn Sims (58.26)	United States	3:53.32	
6	4	Duné Coetzee (58.39); Christin Mundell (58.84); Kate Beavon (59.07); Mariella Venter (1:01.10)	South Africa	3:57.40	
	1		Australia	DNS	
