= Swimming at the 2018 Summer Youth Olympics – Girls' 4 × 100 metre medley relay =

Girls' 4 × 100 metre medley relay at the 2018 Summer Youth Olympics
- Venue: Natatorium
- Dates: 8 October
- Competitors: 28 from 7 nations
- Winning time: 4:05.18

Medalists
gold medal	Peng Xuwei; Zheng Muyan; Lin Xintong; Yang Junxuan	China
silver medal	Kaylee McKeown; Chelsea Hodges; Michaela Ryan; Abbey Webb	Australia
bronze medal	Daria Vaskina; Anastasia Makarova; Polina Egorova; Elizaveta Klevanovich	Russia

The girls' 4 × 100 metre medley relay event at the 2018 Summer Youth Olympics took place on 8 October at the Natatorium in Buenos Aires, Argentina.

== Results ==
=== Final ===
The final was held at 19:29.

Rank	Lane	Name	Nationality	Time	Notes
1st place, gold medalist(s)	4	Peng Xuwei (1:01.64); Zheng Muyan (1:10.13); Lin Xintong (59.42); Yang Junxuan (53.99)	China	4:05.18	
2nd place, silver medalist(s)	5	Kaylee McKeown (1:01.61); Chelsea Hodges (1:08.83); Michaela Ryan (1:00.12); Abbey Webb (54.90)	Australia	4:05.46	
3rd place, bronze medalist(s)	7	Daria Vaskina (1:02.74); Anastasia Makarova (1:08.63); Polina Egorova (59.50); Elizaveta Klevanovich (55.20)	Russia	4:06.07	
4	1	Fernanda de Goeij (1:02.26); Ana Vieira (1:12.04); Maria Pessanha (1:00.63); Rafaela Raurich (56.00)	Brazil	4:10.93	
5	3	Rhyan White (1:01.66); Kate Douglass (1:10.85); Kaitlynn Sims (1:05.68); Maddie Donohoe (58.60)	United States	4:16.79	
6	6	Mariella Venter (1:04.12); Christin Mundell (1:12.05); Duné Coetzee (1:02.61); Kate Beavon (59.00)	South Africa	4:17.78	
	2	Madison Broad (1:02.26); Nina Kucheran (1:10.46); Avery Wiseman (1:04.03); Kyla Leibel	Canada	DSQ	
