= Swimming at the 2018 Summer Youth Olympics – Girls' 50 metre breaststroke =

Girls' 50 metre breaststroke at the 2018 Summer Youth Olympics
- Venue: Natatorium
- Dates: 7 October (heats, semifinals); 8 October (final)
- Competitors: 43 from 38 nations
- Winning time: 31.37

Medalists
gold medal	Agnė Šeleikaitė	Lithuania
silver medal	Chelsea Hodges	Australia
bronze medal	Tina Čelik	Slovenia

The girls' 50 metre breaststroke event at the 2018 Summer Youth Olympics took place on 7 and 8 October at the Natatorium in Buenos Aires, Argentina.

== Results ==
=== Heats ===
The heats were started on 7 October at 10:24.

Rank	Heat	Lane	Name	Nationality	Time	Notes
1	4	4	Agnė Šeleikaitė	Lithuania	31.55	Q
2	6	4	Mona McSharry	Ireland	31.78	Q
3	4	3	Avery Wiseman	Canada	31.81	Q
3	6	2	Hannah Brunzell	Sweden	31.81	Q
5	5	4	Niamh Coyne	Ireland	31.90	Q
6	6	5	Chelsea Hodges	Australia	31.91	Q
7	5	1	Christie Chue	Singapore	31.95	Q
8	5	2	Laura Lahtinen	Finland	32.01	Q
9	6	1	Christin Mundell	South Africa	32.16	Q
10	5	5	Weronika Hallmann	Poland	32.24	Q
11	6	3	Anastasia Makarova	Russia	32.35	Q
12	6	6	Kotryna Teterevkova	Lithuania	32.42	Q
13	4	5	Tina Čelik	Slovenia	32.44	Q
14	4	1	Nina Kucheran	Canada	32.48	Q
15	5	3	Gülşen Beste Samancı	Turkey	32.56	Q
16	4	2	Saovanee Boonamphai	Thailand	32.67	Q
17	6	7	Julia Månsson	Sweden	32.86	
18	5	6	Anastasia Moscenscaia	Moldova	32.89	
19	5	8	Mila Medić	Serbia	32.99	
20	5	7	Clara Basso-Bert	France	33.02	
21	4	6	Elena Guttmann	Austria	33.04	
22	2	5	Zheng Muyan	China	33.23	
22	3	1	Raquel Pereira	Portugal	33.23	
24	3	4	Diana Petkova	Bulgaria	33.26	
25	6	8	Shiori Asaba	Japan	33.46	
26	3	6	Elena Onieva Henrich	Switzerland	33.64	
27	3	5	Ingrid Huszár	Romania	33.68	
28	4	8	Emina Pašukan	Bosnia and Herzegovina	33.84	
29	3	7	Anna Kroniger	Germany	33.98	
30	3	2	Nika Čulina	Croatia	34.27	
31	2	4	Anahi Schreuders	Aruba	34.37	
32	3	8	Miroslava Záborská	Slovakia	34.39	
33	4	7	Camille Mallet	France	34.57	
34	3	3	Bibigul Menlibaeva	Uzbekistan	35.00	
35	1	4	Melisa Zhdrella	Kosovo	35.44	
36	2	6	Lara Al Yafei	Oman	37.35	
37	2	1	Ruvarashe Gondo	Botswana	37.79	
38	2	3	Ramatoulaye Kamara	Senegal	37.94	
39	2	8	Aishath Hulva Khulail	Maldives	43.41	
40	2	2	Rita Ekomba	Equatorial Guinea	49.28	
41	2	7	Gniene Faouzia Sessouma	Burkina Faso	57.76	
42	1	5	María Abdallah Attoumani	Comoros	1:00.13	
43	1	3	Ahmadou Salima	Niger	1:00.64	

=== Semifinals ===
The semifinals were started on 7 October at 18:07.

Rank	Heat	Lane	Name	Nationality	Time	Notes
1	2	4	Agnė Šeleikaitė	Lithuania	31.41	Q
2	1	2	Weronika Hallmann	Poland	31.49	Q
3	1	3	Chelsea Hodges	Australia	31.62	Q
4	2	3	Niamh Coyne	Ireland	31.80	Q
5	2	1	Tina Čelik	Slovenia	31.89	Q
6	1	4	Mona McSharry	Ireland	32.01	Q
7	1	1	Nina Kucheran	Canada	32.17	Q
8	2	5	Avery Wiseman	Canada	32.18	Q
9	1	7	Kotryna Teterevkova	Lithuania	32.30	
10	1	5	Hannah Brunzell	Sweden	32.34	
11	1	6	Laura Lahtinen	Finland	32.49	
12	2	2	Christin Mundell	South Africa	32.77	
13	2	6	Christie Chue	Singapore	32.86	
14	2	7	Anastasia Makarova	Russia	32.89	
15	2	8	Gülşen Beste Samancı	Turkey	33.23	
16	1	8	Saovanee Boonamphai	Thailand	33.34	

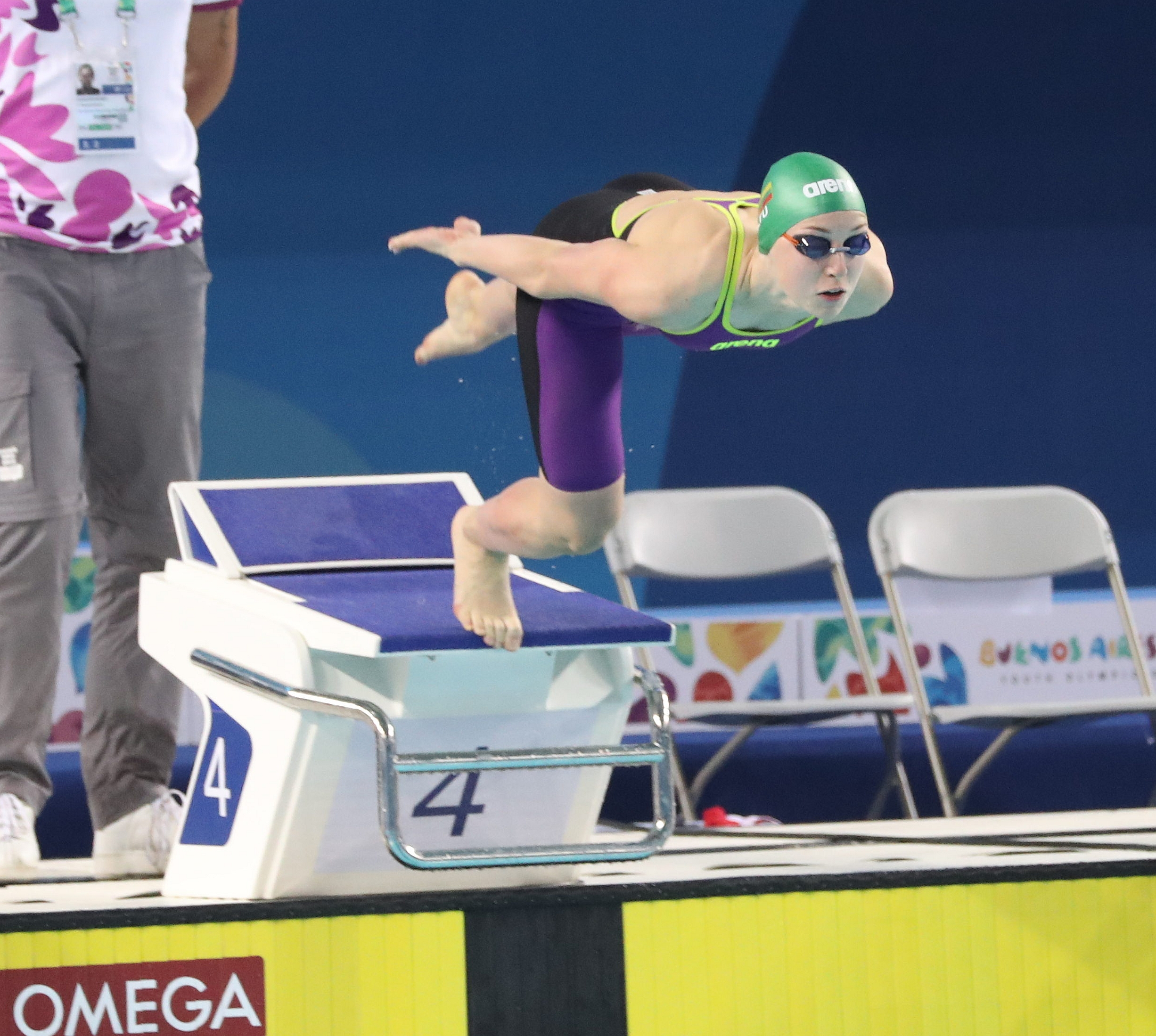
Agnė Šeleikaitė

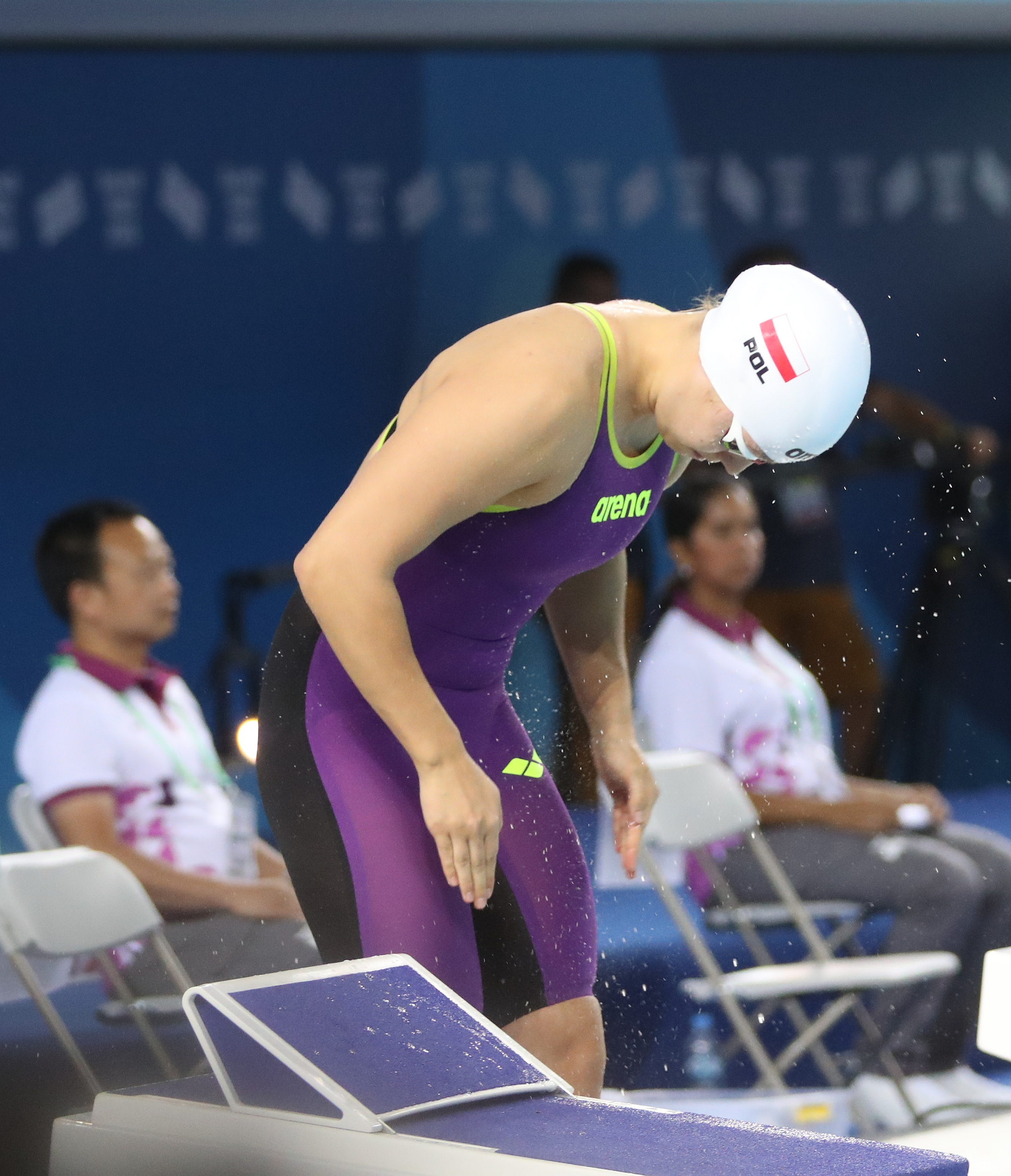
Weronika Hallmann

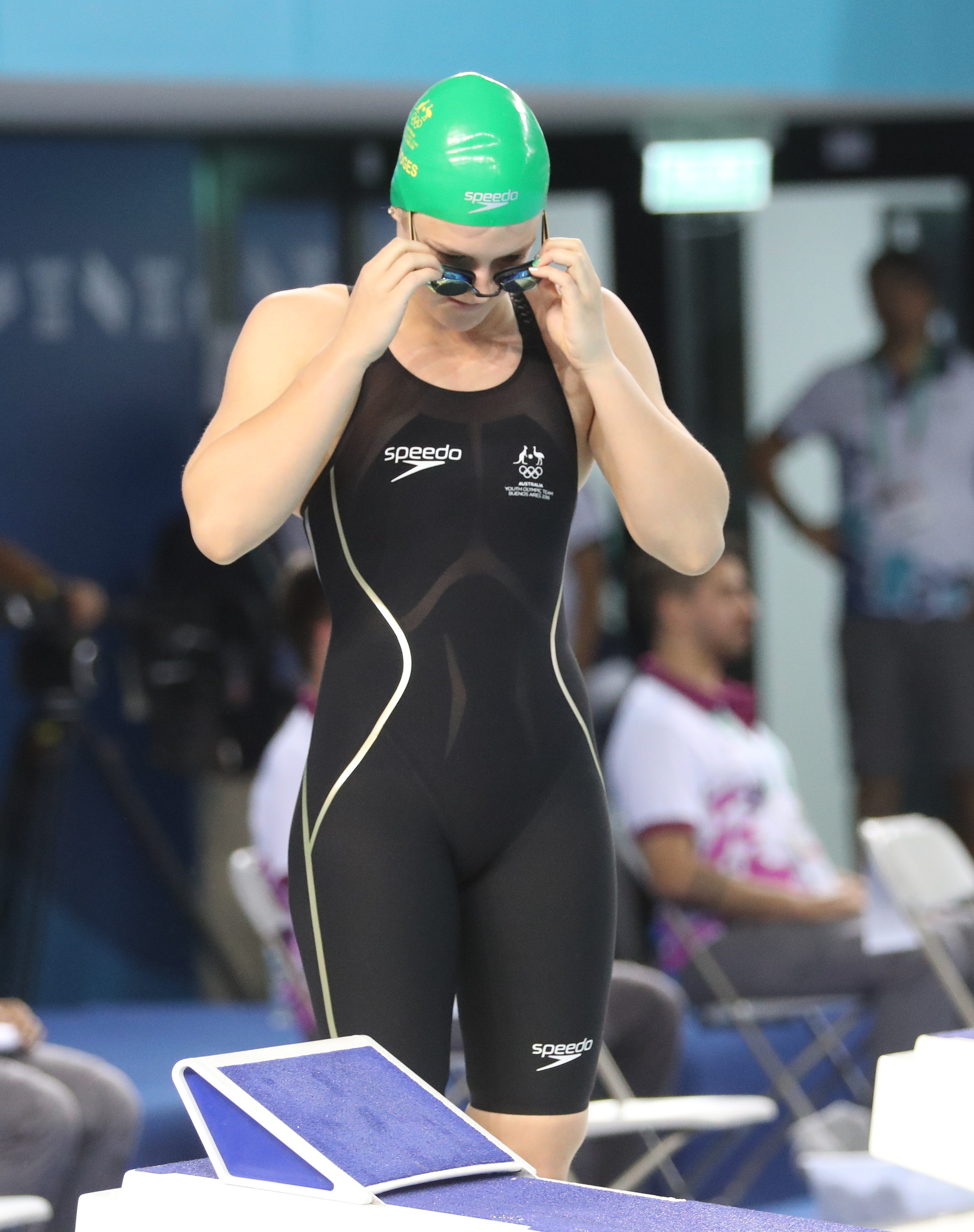
Chelsea Hodges

=== Final ===
The final was held on 8 October at 18:14.

Rank	Lane	Name	Nationality	Time	Notes
1st place, gold medalist(s)	4	Agnė Šeleikaitė	Lithuania	31.37	
2nd place, silver medalist(s)	3	Chelsea Hodges	Australia	31.42	
3rd place, bronze medalist(s)	2	Tina Čelik	Slovenia	31.75	
4	7	Mona McSharry	Ireland	31.96	
5	6	Niamh Coyne	Ireland	32.02	
6	1	Nina Kucheran	Canada	32.06	
7	5	Weronika Hallmann	Poland	32.17	
8	8	Avery Wiseman	Canada	32.79	
