= Swimming at the 2018 Summer Youth Olympics – Girls' 100 metre backstroke =

Girls' 100 metre backstroke at the 2018 Summer Youth Olympics
- Venue: Natatorium
- Dates: 7 October (heats, semifinals); 8 October (final)
- Competitors: 26 from 23 nations
- Winning time: 1:00.45

Medalists
gold medal	Daria Vaskina	Russia
silver medal	Kaylee McKeown	Australia
bronze medal	Rhyan White	United States

The girls' 100 metre backstroke event at the 2018 Summer Youth Olympics took place on 7 and 8 October at the Natatorium in Buenos Aires, Argentina.

== Results ==
=== Heats ===
The heats were started on 7 October at 10:48.

Rank	Heat	Lane	Name	Nationality	Time	Notes
1	3	3	Rhyan White	United States	1:00.88	Q
2	2	4	Kaylee McKeown	Australia	1:01.29	Q
3	4	4	Polina Egorova	Russia	1:01.74	Q
4	4	5	Peng Xuwei	China	1:01.78	Q
5	3	5	Madison Broad	Canada	1:01.86	Q
6	3	4	Daria Vaskina	Russia	1:02.05	Q
7	2	3	Tamara Frías	Spain	1:02.13	Q
8	3	7	Ingeborg Løyning	Norway	1:02.50	Q
9	3	2	Gina Galloway	New Zealand	1:02.66	Q
10	3	6	Anastasiya Shkurdai	Belarus	1:02.68	Q
11	2	2	Maria Pessanha	Brazil	1:02.89	Q
12	4	6	Laura Ilyés	Hungary	1:02.97	Q
13	2	5	Mariella Venter	South Africa	1:03.15	Q
14	4	3	Tatiana Salcuțan	Moldova	1:03.16	Q
15	4	2	Fernanda de Goeij	Brazil	1:03.30	Q
16	2	7	Cristina García	Spain	1:03.54	Q
17	4	7	Lila Touili	France	1:03.63	
18	3	1	Arina Baikova	Latvia	1:04.01	
19	2	1	Diana Nazarova	Kazakhstan	1:04.10	
20	4	1	Chen Szu-chi	Chinese Taipei	1:04.17	
21	2	6	Maryna Kolesnykova	Ukraine	1:04.27	
22	3	8	Andrea Hurtado	Peru	1:04.67	
23	4	8	Lucija Šulenta	Croatia	1:05.82	
24	1	4	Natalie Kan	Hong Kong	1:06.20	
25	2	8	Taydé Sansores	Mexico	1:06.58	
26	1	1	Mia Krstevska	Macedonia	1:08.85	
	1	3	Robyn Young	Eswatini	DNS	

=== Semifinals ===
The semifinals were started on 7 October at 18:30.

Rank	Heat	Lane	Name	Nationality	Time	Notes
1	2	5	Polina Egorova	Russia	1:00.92	Q
2	2	4	Rhyan White	United States	1:00.94	Q
3	1	3	Daria Vaskina	Russia	1:01.41	Q
4	1	4	Kaylee McKeown	Australia	1:01.51	Q
5	2	3	Madison Broad	Canada	1:01.66	Q
6	1	1	Tatiana Salcuțan	Moldova	1:02.04	Q
7	1	5	Peng Xuwei	China	1:02.12	Q
8	2	6	Tamara Frías	Spain	1:02.17	Q
9	2	8	Fernanda de Goeij	Brazil	1:02.48	
10	1	7	Laura Ilyés	Hungary	1:02.90	
11	2	7	Maria Pessanha	Brazil	1:03.00	
12	1	2	Anastasiya Shkurdai	Belarus	1:03.06	
13	1	6	Ingeborg Løyning	Norway	1:03.26	
14	1	8	Cristina García	Spain	1:03.39	
14	2	2	Gina Galloway	New Zealand	1:03.39	
16	2	1	Mariella Venter	South Africa	1:03.53	

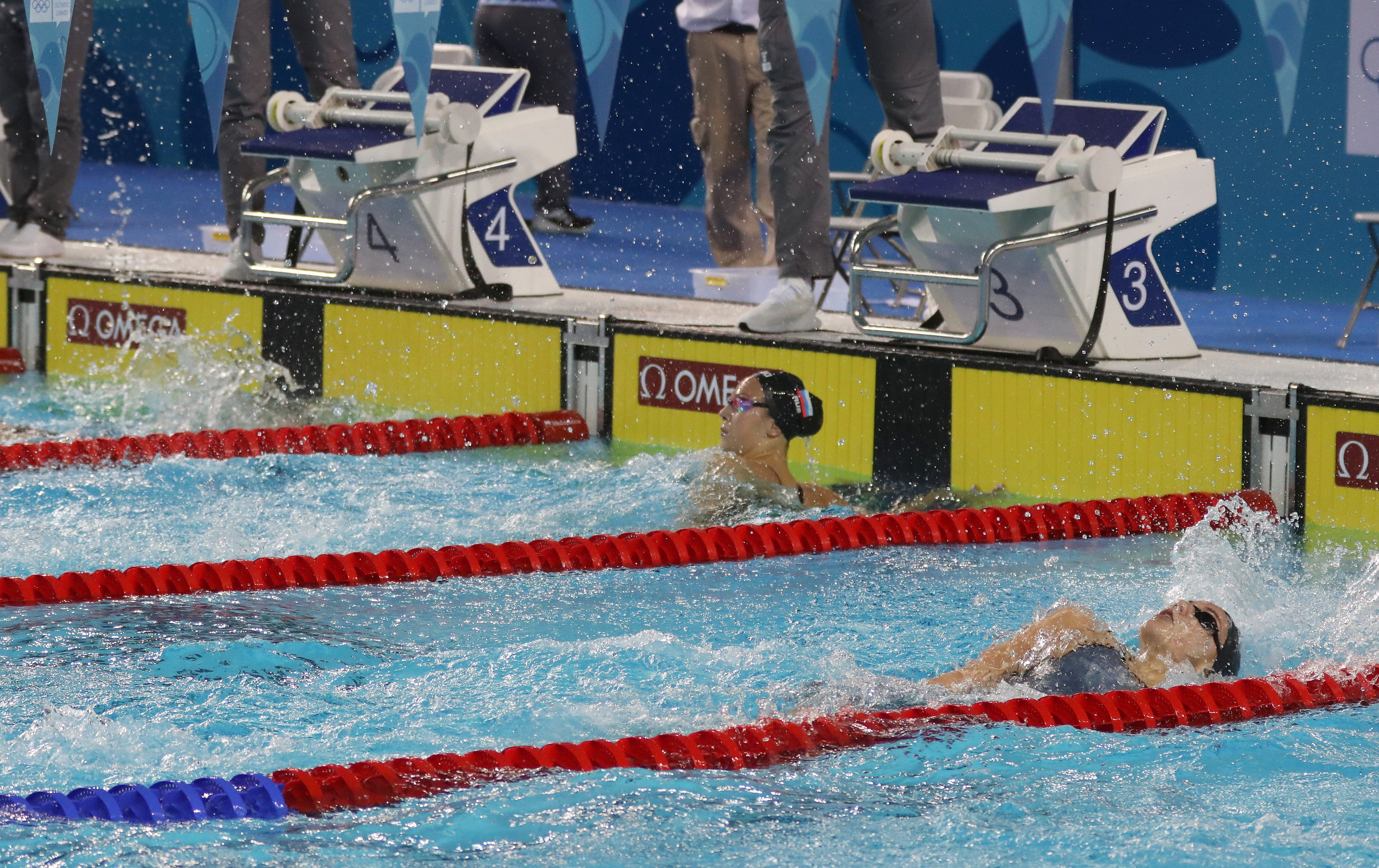
Semifinal 1

=== Final ===
The final was held on 8 October at 19:06.

Rank	Lane	Name	Nationality	Time	Notes
1st place, gold medalist(s)	3	Daria Vaskina	Russia	1:00.45	
2nd place, silver medalist(s)	6	Kaylee McKeown	Australia	1:00.58	
3rd place, bronze medalist(s)	5	Rhyan White	United States	1:00.60	
4	4	Polina Egorova	Russia	1:01.25	
5	2	Madison Broad	Canada	1:01.37	
6	1	Peng Xuwei	China	1:01.44	
7	8	Tamara Frías	Spain	1:01.93	
8	7	Tatiana Salcuțan	Moldova	1:02.20	
