= Anastasia Makarova =

Russian swimmer

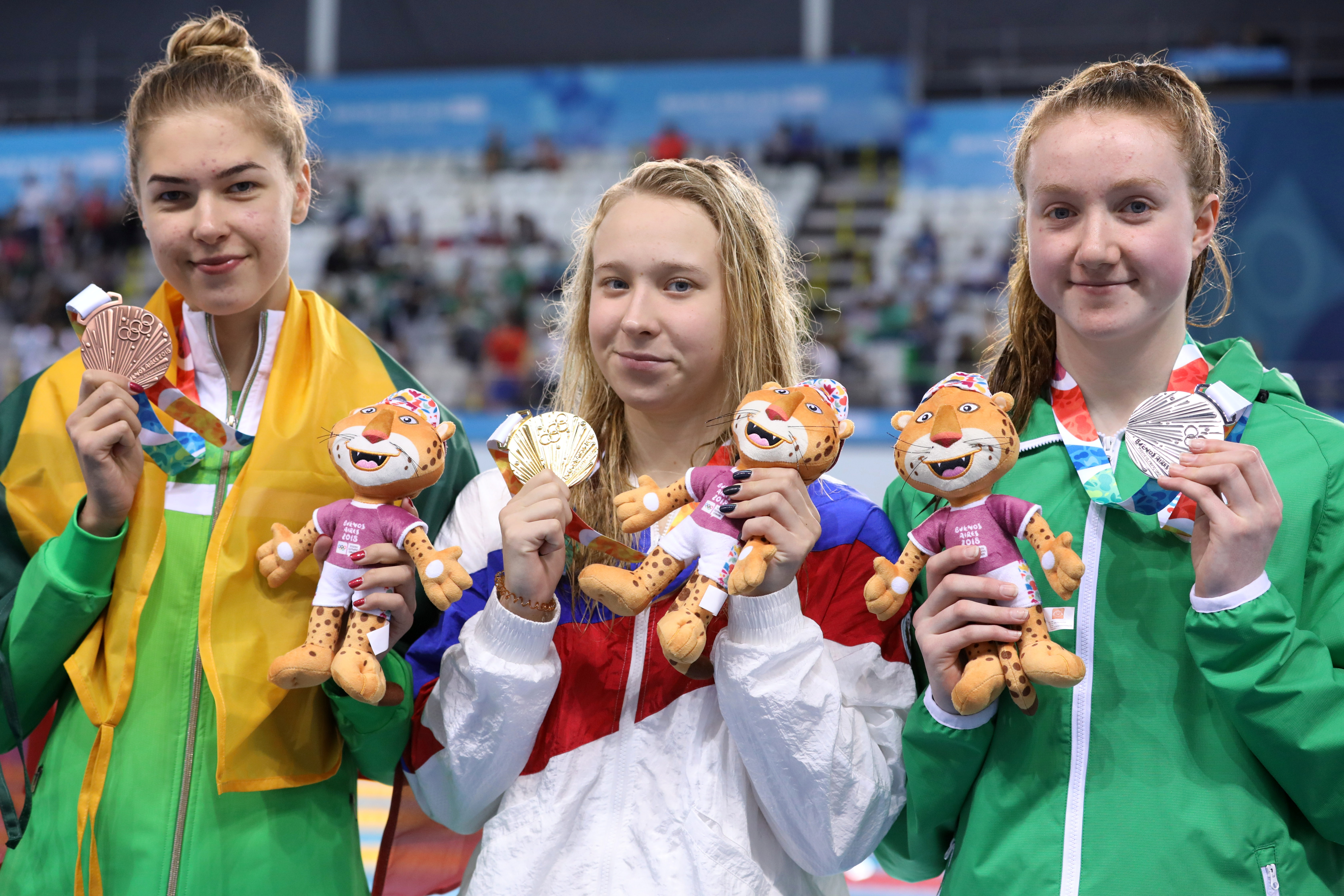
- Makarova (middle) in 2018

Personal information
- Full name: Anastasia R. Makarova
- National team: Russia
- Born: 8 January 2003 (age 23) Russia

Sport
- Sport: Swimming
- Strokes: Breaststroke, freestyle
- College team: Auburn University
Medal record
Women's swimming
Representing Russia
Event	1st	2nd	3rd
World Junior Championships	0	3	0
European Junior Championships	2	4	1
Summer Youth Olympics	3	1	1
Total	5	8	2
World Junior Championships
Silver medal – second place	2019 Budapest	200 m breaststroke
Silver medal – second place	2019 Budapest	4×100 m mixed medley
Silver medal – second place	2019 Budapest	4×100 m medley
European Junior Championships
Gold medal – first place	2018 Helsinki	200 m breaststroke
Gold medal – first place	2019 Kazan	4×100 m medley
Silver medal – second place	2018 Helsinki	100 m breaststroke
Silver medal – second place	2018 Helsinki	4×100 m medley
Silver medal – second place	2019 Kazan	100 m breaststroke
Silver medal – second place	2019 Kazan	200 m breaststroke
Bronze medal – third place	2019 Kazan	50 m breaststroke
Summer Youth Olympics
Gold medal – first place	2018 Buenos Aires	100 m breaststroke
Gold medal – first place	2018 Buenos Aires	4×100 m mixed freestyle
Gold medal – first place	2018 Buenos Aires	4×100 m freestyle
Silver medal – second place	2018 Buenos Aires	4×100 m mixed medley
Bronze medal – third place	2018 Buenos Aires	4×100 m medley

Anastasia R. Makarova (born 8 January 2003) is a Russian competitive swimmer. In the 100 metre breaststroke, she won the gold medal at the 2018 Summer Youth Olympics and silver medals at the European Junior Swimming Championships in 2018 and 2019. In the 200 metre breaststroke, she won a silver medal at the 2019 World Junior Championships, a gold medal at the 2018 European Junior Championships, and a silver medal at the 2019 European Junior Championships. In the 50 metre breaststroke, she won a bronze medal at the 2019 European Junior Championships.

== Background ==
Makarova was born 8 January 2003 in Russia. In 2022, Makarova started attending Auburn University and competing collegiately on the school swim team partway through the 2021–2022 season, participating in her first competition in early February 2022.

== Career ==
=== 2018 ===
==== 2018 European Junior Championships ====
In July, at the 2018 European Junior Swimming Championships in Helsinki, Finland, Makarova placed sixth in the final of the 50 metre breaststroke on the first day of competition with a time of 31.71 seconds. On the third day of competition, Makarova won two medals in the same finals session, first winning a gold medal in the 200 metre breaststroke with a time of 2:26.29 and second winning a silver medal as part of the Russia 4×100 metre medley relay, where the relay finished with a time of 4:04.52 behind of the relay from Great Britain and ahead of the Germany relay. For the fifth and final day of competition, Makarova won the silver medal in the 100 metre breaststroke with a time of 1:08.46, finishing 0.43 seconds after gold medalist Kotryna Teterevkova of Lithuania, 0.22 seconds ahead of bronze medalist Anna Elendt of Germany, and 0.27 seconds ahead of Niamh Coyne of Ireland. Heading into the final of the 100 metre breaststroke, Makarova had ranked first in the semifinals heats with a time of 1:08.46.

==== 2018 Summer Youth Olympics ====
2018 Summer Youth Olympics
Gold medal – first place	4×100 m mixed freestyle	3:28.50 (h)
Gold medal – first place	100 m breaststroke	1:07.88
Gold medal – first place	4×100 m freestyle	3:45.26
Silver medal – second place	4×100 m mixed medley	3:49.79
Bronze medal – third place	4×100 m medley	4:06.07

Day one of the 2018 Summer Youth Olympics in Buenos Aires, Argentina, at the Natatorium, Makarova swam the anchor leg of the 4×100 metre mixed freestyle relay in a time of 57.67, helping the relay qualify for the final ranked eighth, and won a gold medal in the event for her contribution in the prelims heats when the finals relay team, which did not include Makarova, finished first with a time of 3:28.50. The same day, Makarova placed 14th in the semifinals of the 50 metre breaststroke and did not advance to the final of the event. The next day, she split a 1:08.63 on the breaststroke leg of the 4×100 metre medley relay in the final to win the silver medal in a relay time of 4:06.07 with Daria Vaskina (backstroke), Polina Egorova (butterfly), and Elizaveta Klevanovich (freestyle). In the final of the 100 metre breaststroke on day four, both Makarova and Niamh Coyne improved their final placement relative to the 2018 European Junior Championships, with Makarova winning the gold medal with a time of 1:07.88 and Niamh Coyne winning the silver medal in 1:08.90.

On the fifth day, Makarova split a 56.84 for the second leg of the 4×100 metre freestyle relay, helping achieve a time of 3:46.26 in the final, which was almost two seconds faster than the next relay team, the Brazil relay, and earned the Russia relay team the gold medal. Come the sixth and final day of swimming at the 2018 Summer Youth Olympics, Makarova started wrapping up her competition with the 200 metre breaststroke, where she placed sixth in the final with a time of 2:29.03, finishing two-hundredths of a second behind the fifth-place finisher Alba Vázquez of Spain. Makarova finished wrapping up her competition in the 4×100 metre mixed medley relay, swimming the breaststroke leg of the relay in 1:10.00 and helping the finals relay consisting of her, Polina Egorova, Andrei Minakov, and Kliment Kolesnikov, finish second with a time of 3:51.46 and win the silver medal.

=== 2019 ===
==== 2019 European Junior Championships ====
On the first day of competition at the Palace of Water Sports in Kazan for the 2019 European Junior Swimming Championships, Makarova won a bronze medal in the 50 metre breaststroke, finishing behind Benedetta Pilato of Italy and Kotryna Teterevkova with a time of 31.26 seconds. Two days later, 5 July, Makarova won her first medal of the finals session in the 200 metre breaststroke where she won the silver medal with her time of 2:26.06. Later in the same finals session, Makarova swam the breaststroke leg of the 4×100 metre medley relay in a time of 1:07.86 to help win the gold medal and achieve a Championships record time of 4:01.83. The fifth and final day of competition, Makarova won a silver medal in the 100 metre breaststroke, finishing behind Kayla van der Merwe of Great Britain and ahead of Evgeniia Chikunova of Russia.

==== 2019 World Junior Championships ====
2019 World Junior Championships
Silver medal – second place	4×100 m mixed medley	3:48.06
Silver medal – second place	200 m breaststroke	2:24.39
Silver medal – second place	4×100 m medley	4:00.30 (h)

On the first day of competition at the 2019 FINA World Junior Swimming Championships held at Danube Arena in Budapest, Hungary, Makarova advanced to the final of the 50 metre breaststroke ranking seventh with a time of 31.67 seconds. In the final of the event the next day, she placed fifth in 31.34 seconds. Later in the same finals session, Makarova won a silver medal as part of the 4×100 metre mixed medley relay, swimming the breaststroke leg of the relay in a time of 1:07.30 and contributing to the final relay time of 3:48.06. In the 100 metre breaststroke final two days later, Makarova finished fourth with a time of 1:07.10, just four-hundredths of a second behind the bronze medalist in the event Kayla van der Merwe. Her time of 1:07.10, ranked Makarova as the number five female performer 18 years of age or younger for the 2019 year in the 100 metre breaststroke, seven spots higher than Lydia Jacoby of the United States. The final day of competition, Makarova swam the breaststroke leg of the 4×100 metre medley relay in the prelims heats, helping the relay achieve a rank of second with a time of 4:04.57 heading into the final. In the final, Makarova was substituted out and won a silver medal when the finals relay finished second with a time of 4:00.30. For her final individual event, Makarova won a silver medal in the 200 metre breaststroke, swimming a 2:24.39 to finish less than four-tenths of a second after the gold medalist in the event Evgeniia Chikunova.

=== 2021 ===
==== 2021 Swimming World Cup: Kazan ====
At the fourth stop of the 2021 FINA Swimming World Cup, held in Kazan, Makarova started competition on the first day, 28 October, in the 200 metre breaststroke with a time 2:29.16 that qualified her to the final ranked seventh overall. Later in the day in the final of the 200 metre breaststroke, she placed seventh in 2:27.95. The second day of competition, Makarova advanced to the final of the 100 metre breaststroke ranked fifth with a time of 1:07.13. She followed up her morning performance with a time of 1:06.40 and sixth-place finish in the final. On the third and final day of the stop, Makarova swam a 31.31 in the prelims heats of the 50 metre breaststroke and did not advance to the final.

=== 2022 ===
At the 2022 Auburn University Invitational in early February 2022, Makarova won the 100 yard breaststroke and 200 yard breaststroke with personal best times of 1:00.24 and 2:11.74, respectively. Her 200-yard breaststroke time and her time of 59.98 seconds in a 100-yard breaststroke time trial were in the top ten fastest times ever swam in the events in the history of the Auburn University swim program.

==== 2022 Southeastern Conference Championships ====
For the 2022 Southeastern Conference Championships in mid-February, Makarova entered to compete in the 100 yard butterfly, 100 yard breaststroke, and 200 yard breaststroke individual events representing her collegiate team, the Auburn Tigers. In her first event of the Championships, the 4×50 yard medley relay on day one, Makarova helped achieve a fourth-place finish for the Auburn Tigers relay team with a split of 26.87 on the breaststroke leg of the relay. On day three, Makarova swam the 100 yard butterfly in competition through the NCAA for the first time, placing 51st with a time of 55.66 seconds. Day four, she competed in the prelims heats of the 100 yard breaststroke and did not swim fast enough to qualify for the fastest final. Her time of 1:00.25 did qualify her for the b-final later in the day, where she ranked 15th across all prelims heats heading into the three finals heats. She won the b-final with a personal best time of 59.36 seconds. During the same finals session, she helped achieve an eighth-place finish in the 4×100 yard medley relay in 3:33.71 with a split of 1:00.06 for the breaststroke leg of the relay. On the final day of competition, Makarova placed 30th in the 200 yard breaststroke with a time of 2:15.73.

==== First ban for her nationality ====
Two weeks later, on 3 March, Makarova and all other Russians and Belarusians were banned from LEN European competitions indefinitely, denying her the opportunity of making her senior international debut at the 2022 European Aquatics Championships.

==== 2022 NCAA Championships ====
On 16 March 2022, Makarova split a 27.40 for the breaststroke leg of the 4×50 yard medley relay at the 2022 NCAA Championships to help achieve a 23rd-place finish in 1:37.16. Day three of competition, she tied for 20th-place in the 100 yard breaststroke with a time of 59.48 seconds and helped achieve an 18th-place finish in the 4×100 yard medley relay in 3:31.42, splitting a 59.69 for the breaststroke leg of the relay. In the morning on the fourth and final day, she placed 52nd in the 200 yard breaststroke with a time of 2:18.98.

==== Second ban for her nationality ====
On 21 April 2022, FINA echoed the actions of LEN the month before, banning all Russians and Belarusians from their competitions, only with the communicated end date at the time of ban implementation the end of the 2022 calendar year, 31 December 2022. With the enactment, and lasting the duration, of the ban, FINA also stopped counting times swum by Russians towards world records and world rankings. In April 2023, the ban on Russians and Belarusians was extended indefinitely.

=== 2022–2023: Second collegiate season ===
At the 2022 University of Georgia Invitational in November in Athens, United States, Makarova swam a personal best time of 2:03.75 in the 200 yard individual medley on the first day, placing twenty-eighth overall in the preliminaries. The following day, she swam the fastest time in the history of the Auburn University swim program by a female swimmer in the 100 yard breaststroke with a personal best time of 58.91 seconds, placing second amongst the female competitors from all schools competing. On the third of three days, she finished in a personal best time of 2:09.35 in the final of the 200 yard breaststroke, tying for fifth-place. The points earned for her team from her placings in her individual events contributed to an overall win for the women's team.

==== 2023 Southeastern Conference Championships ====
For her first event of her second Southeastern Conference Championships, held in February 2023, Makarova helped achieve a fourth-place finish in the 4×50 yard medley relay in 1:36.02, splitting a 26.87 for the breaststroke leg of the relay. The second day, she placed forty-sixth in the 50 yard freestyle with a time of 23.35 seconds. On the fourth of five days, she placed fifth in the final of the 100 yard breaststroke with a time of 59.30 seconds. Later in the session, she split a 1:00.27 for the breaststroke leg of the 4×100 yard medley relay, helping place tenth in 3:33.65. Day five of five, she won the c-final of the 200 yard breaststroke with a time of 2:11.40.

==== 2023 NCAA Championships ====
Opening her competition at the 2023 NCAA Division I Championships on day one, Makarova contributed a breaststroke split of 27.49 to a nineteenth-place time of 1:37.00 in the 4×50 yard medley relay. In the 100 yard breaststroke on day three, she finished in a time of 59.86 seconds in the preliminaries and placed twenty-ninth overall. For the 4×100 yard medley relay the same day, she helped place fourteenth in a seventh-rank Auburn Tigers swim program time of 3:31.34. She followed up with an overall ranking of fifty-fourth in the 200 yard breaststroke the following, and final, day, finishing in a time of 2:14.90.

=== 2023 Russian Championships ===
Day one of the 2023 Russian National Championships in Kazan, Makarova placed 22nd in the preliminary heats of the 50 metre breaststroke with a time of 32.91 seconds. Two morning sessions later, she ranked sixth across all preliminary heats of the 100 metre breaststroke with a time of 1:09.50 and qualified for the event semifinals. She ranked fourth in her semifinal, ninth overall, and received a b-classification with a time of 1:09.74.

== International championships ==
Meet	50 breaststroke	100 breaststroke	200 breaststroke	4×100 free	4×50 medley	4×100 medley	4×100 mixed free	4×100 mixed medley
EYOF 2017	—N/a	1st place, gold medalist(s)	10th	1st place, gold medalist(s)		1st place, gold medalist(s)		
EJC 2018	6th	2nd place, silver medalist(s)	1st place, gold medalist(s)			1st place, gold medalist(s)		
YOG 2018	14th	1st place, gold medalist(s)	6th	1st place, gold medalist(s)		3rd place, bronze medalist(s)	(gold) ^{[a]}	2nd place, silver medalist(s)
EJC 2019	3rd place, bronze medalist(s)	2nd place, silver medalist(s)	2nd place, silver medalist(s)			1st place, gold medalist(s)		
WJC 2019	5th	4th	2nd place, silver medalist(s)			(silver) ^{[a]}		2nd place, silver medalist(s)
NCAA 2022	—N/a	20th	52nd		23rd	18th	—N/a	—N/a
NCAA 2023	—N/a	29th	54th		19th	14th	—N/a	—N/a

^{a} Makarova swam only in the prelims heats.

== Personal best times ==
=== Long course metres (50 m pool) ===
Event	Time	Meet	Location	Date	Ref
50 m freestyle	26.87	2019 Swimming World Cup	Kazan	1 November 2019	
100 m freestyle	58.67	2019 Russian Junior Championships	Penza	15 May 2019	
50 m breaststroke	31.26	2019 European Junior Championships	Kazan	3 July 2019	
100 m breaststroke	1:07.10	2019 World Junior Championships	Budapest, Hungary	23 August 2019	
200 m breaststroke	2:24.39	2019 World Junior Championships	Budapest, Hungary	25 August 2019	

=== Short course metres (25 m pool) ===
Event	Time	Meet	Location	Date	Ref
50 m breaststroke	30.99	2019 Russian Short Course Championships	Kazan	6 November 2019	
100 m breaststroke	1:06.21	2019 Russian Short Course Championships	Kazan	8 November 2019	
200 m breaststroke	2:23.92	2019 Russian Short Course Championships	Kazan	10 November 2019	

=== Short course yards (25 yd pool) ===
Event	Time		Meet	Location	Date	Ref
100 yd breaststroke	58.91		2022 University of Georgia Invitational	Athens, United States	18 November 2022	
200 yd breaststroke	2:09.35		2022 University of Georgia Invitational	Athens, United States	19 November 2022	
100 yd butterfly	55.66	h	2022 Southeastern Conference Championships	Knoxville, United States	17 February 2022	
200 yd individual medley	2:03.75	h	2022 University of Georgia Invitational	Athens, United States	17 November 2022	

Legend: h – prelims heat
