= Swimming at the 2018 Summer Youth Olympics – Girls' 100 metre butterfly =

Girls' 100 metre butterfly at the 2018 Summer Youth Olympics
- Venue: Natatorium
- Dates: 11 October (heats, semifinals); 12 October (final)
- Competitors: 29 from 27 nations
- Winning time: 59.22

Medalists
gold medal	Polina Egorova	Russia
silver medal	Angelina Köhler	Germany
bronze medal	Anastasiya Shkurdai	Belarus

The girls' 100 metre butterfly event at the 2018 Summer Youth Olympics took place on 11 and 12 October at the Natatorium in Buenos Aires, Argentina.

== Results ==
=== Heats ===
The heats started on 11 October at 11:05.

Rank	Heat	Lane	Name	Nationality	Time	Notes
1	4	3	Angelina Köhler	Germany	59.99	Q
2	2	4	Polina Egorova	Russia	1:00.23	Q
3	2	5	Anastasiya Shkurdai	Belarus	1:00.48	Q
4	4	6	Yuliia Stadnyk	Ukraine	1:01.01	Q
5	3	8	Natalie Kan	Hong Kong	1:01.06	Q
6	4	5	Lin Xintong	China	1:01.19	Q
7	3	4	Michaela Ryan	Australia	1:01.30	Q
8	2	3	Aleyna Özkan	Turkey	1:01.41	Q
9	4	4	Sara Junevik	Sweden	1:01.50	Q
10	3	5	Miriam Guevara	Mexico	1:01.54	Q
11	3	3	Petra Barócsai	Hungary	1:01.83	Q
12	4	2	Dune Coetzee	South Africa	1:01.92	Q
13	1	4	Beatriz Padrón	Costa Rica	1:02.07	Q
14	1	6	Maria Pessanha	Brazil	1:02.11	Q
15	2	1	Laura Lahtinen	Finland	1:02.15	Q
16	2	8	Kristýna Štemberová	Czech Republic	1:02.20	Q
17	4	8	Lismar Lyon	Venezuela	1:02.30	
18	2	7	Blanka Berecz	Hungary	1:02.43	
19	3	6	Valentina Becerra	Colombia	1:02.45	
20	2	6	Julia Mrozinski	Germany	1:02.56	
20	3	7	Lea Polonsky	Israel	1:02.56	
22	1	3	Gina Galloway	New Zealand	1:02.85	
23	2	2	Adinda Larasati Dewi	Indonesia	1:03.02	
24	3	1	Chen Yu-rong	Chinese Taipei	1:03.21	
25	1	2	Inés Marín	Chile	1:03.37	
26	4	1	Anicka Delgado	Ecuador	1:03.47	
27	4	7	Alexandra Schegoleva	Cyprus	1:03.55	
28	3	2	Tamara Potocká	Slovakia	1:04.80	
29	1	7	Theresa Hefel	Liechtenstein	1:06.81	
	1	5	Leoni Richter	Switzerland	DNS	

=== Semifinals ===
The semifinals started on 11 October at 18:12.

Rank	Heat	Lane	Name	Nationality	Time	Notes
1	2	5	Anastasiya Shkurdai	Belarus	59.72	Q
2	2	4	Angelina Köhler	Germany	59.78	Q
3	1	4	Polina Egorova	Russia	1:00.14	Q
4	1	3	Lin Xintong	China	1:00.21	Q
5	1	2	Miriam Guevara	Mexico	1:00.36	Q
6	1	6	Aleyna Özkan	Turkey	1:00.77	Q
7	2	2	Sara Junevik	Sweden	1:00.85	Q
8	2	3	Natalie Kan	Hong Kong	1:01.05	Q
9	1	5	Yuliia Stadnyk	Ukraine	1:01.19	
10	2	6	Michaela Ryan	Australia	1:01.20	
11	1	7	Dune Coetzee	South Africa	1:01.29	
12	1	1	Maria Pessanha	Brazil	1:01.46	
13	2	7	Petra Barócsai	Hungary	1:01.95	
14	2	1	Beatriz Padrón	Costa Rica	1:01.99	
15	2	8	Laura Lahtinen	Finland	1:02.00	
16	1	8	Kristýna Štemberová	Czech Republic	1:02.27	

=== Final ===
The final was held on 12 October at 18:11.

Rank	Lane	Name	Nationality	Time	Notes
1st place, gold medalist(s)	3	Polina Egorova	Russia	59.22	
2nd place, silver medalist(s)	5	Angelina Köhler	Germany	59.44	
3rd place, bronze medalist(s)	4	Anastasiya Shkurdai	Belarus	59.76	
4	6	Lin Xintong	China	1:00.35	
5	1	Sara Junevik	Sweden	1:00.41	
6	2	Miriam Guevara	Mexico	1:00.90	
7	8	Natalie Kan	Hong Kong	1:01.21	
8	7	Aleyna Özkan	Turkey	1:01.47	
