= Swimming at the 2018 Summer Youth Olympics – Girls' 200 metre breaststroke =

Girls' 200 metre breaststroke at the 2018 Summer Youth Olympics
- Venue: Natatorium
- Dates: 12 October
- Competitors: 36 from 30 nations
- Winning time: 2:26.80

Medalists
gold medal	Shiori Asaba	Japan
silver medal	Kotryna Teterevkova	Lithuania
bronze medal	Wang Hee-song	South Korea

The girls' 200 metre breaststroke event at the 2018 Summer Youth Olympics took place on 12 October at the Natatorium in Buenos Aires, Argentina.

== Results ==
=== Heats ===
The heats were started at 10:11.

Rank	Heat	Lane	Name	Nationality	Time	Notes
1	5	5	Shiori Asaba	Japan	2:29.12	Q
2	5	4	Zheng Muyan	China	2:29.61	Q
3	3	4	Anastasia Makarova	Russia	2:30.10	Q
4	3	2	Alba Vázquez	Spain	2:30.30	Q
5	4	3	Anna Kroniger	Germany	2:30.65	Q
5	4	4	Wang Hee-song	South Korea	2:30.65	Q
7	4	1	Yun Eun-sol	South Korea	2:31.22	Q
8	4	5	Kotryna Teterevkova	Lithuania	2:31.36	Q
9	5	3	Anna Pirovano	Italy	2:31.75	
10	1	7	María Alborzen	Argentina	2:32.14	
11	4	6	Hannah Brunzell	Sweden	2:32.34	
12	5	1	Eleni Kontogeorgou	Greece	2:32.38	
13	3	7	Weronika Hallmann	Poland	2:32.52	
14	3	6	Nikoletta Pavlopoulou	Greece	2:32.61	
15	3	1	Julia Månsson	Sweden	2:32.99	
16	5	2	Raquel Pereira	Portugal	2:33.07	
17	4	2	Anastasia Gorbenko	Israel	2:33.13	
18	5	7	Niamh Coyne	Ireland	2:33.27	
19	2	4	Miroslava Záborská	Slovakia	2:34.32	
20	1	3	Tina Čelik	Slovenia	2:34.54	
21	1	4	Claudia Maria Gâdea	Romania	2:34.61	
22	3	8	Agnė Šeleikaitė	Lithuania	2:35.02	
23	2	1	Emina Pašukan	Bosnia and Herzegovina	2:36.43	
24	1	8	Christie Chue	Singapore	2:36.49	
25	5	6	Avery Wiseman	Canada	2:36.71	
26	4	7	Christin Mundell	South Africa	2:37.06	
27	1	1	Elena Guttmann	Austria	2:37.22	
28	4	8	Vũ Thị Phương Anh	Vietnam	2:37.58	
29	5	8	Elena Onieva Henrich	Switzerland	2:38.12	
30	1	2	Azzahra Permatahani	Indonesia	2:38.45	
31	2	8	Anastasia Moscenscaia	Moldova	2:38.57	
32	1	6	Natalie Kan	Hong Kong	2:40.03	
33	2	5	Nika Čulina	Croatia	2:40.34	
34	2	2	Ingrid Huszár	Romania	2:40.65	
35	1	5	Tina Tadić	Bosnia and Herzegovina	2:48.65	
	2	3	Laura Lahtinen	Finland	DSQ	
	2	6	Clara Basso-Bert	France	DNS	
	2	7	Gülşen Beste Samancı	Turkey	DNS	
	3	3	Nina Kucheran	Canada	DNS	
	3	5	Mona McSharry	Ireland	DNS	

=== Final ===
The final was held at 18:29.

Rank	Lane	Name	Nationality	Time	Notes
1st place, gold medalist(s)	4	Shiori Asaba	Japan	2:26.80	
2nd place, silver medalist(s)	8	Kotryna Teterevkova	Lithuania	2:28.18	
3rd place, bronze medalist(s)	7	Wang Hee-song	South Korea	2:28.83	
4	5	Zheng Muyan	China	2:28.99	
5	6	Alba Vázquez	Spain	2:29.01	
6	3	Anastasia Makarova	Russia	2:29.03	
7	1	Yun Eun-sol	South Korea	2:30.33	
8	2	Anna Kroniger	Germany	2:30.93	
