= Fernanda de Goeij =

Brazilian swimmer (born 2000)

Personal information
- Nationality: Brazil
- Born: November 11, 2000 (age 25) Curitiba, Paraná, Brazil
- Height: 1.60 m (5 ft 3 in)
- Weight: 57 kg (126 lb)

Sport
- Sport: Swimming
- Strokes: Backstroke
- Club: Clube Curitibano
- College team: University of Missouri
Medal record
Women's swimming
Representing Brazil
Pan American Games
Bronze medal – third place	2019 Lima	4×100 m medley
South American Games
Gold medal – first place	2018 Cochabamba	4×100 m medley
Silver medal – second place	2018 Cochabamba	100 m backstroke
Silver medal – second place	2018 Cochabamba	200 m backstroke
Youth Olympic Games
Silver medal – second place	2018 Buenos Aires	4×100 m freestyle

Fernanda de Goeij (born November 11, 2000, in Curitiba) is a Brazilian swimmer.

== International career ==
She started swimming in the butterfly style, but a back problem prevented her from following the training in that style. She changed to a swim that gave her national titles and the vacancies in the Brazilian National Team.

At the 2018 South American Games in Cochabamba, she won a gold medal in the 4 × 100 m medley, and two silver medals in the 100m and 200m backstroke.

At the 2018 Summer Youth Olympics held in Buenos Aires, she won a silver medal in the girls' 4 × 100 metre freestyle relay. It was the first time that a Brazil's women's relay won a swimming medal on a world level. She also finished 4th in the girls' 4 × 100 metre medley relay, 5th in the girls' 50 metre backstroke, 9th in the girls' 100 metre backstroke, 11th in the girls' 200 metre backstroke and 12th in the mixed 4 × 100 metre medley relay.

At just 18 years old, she went to the 2019 Pan American Games held in Lima, Peru, where, in the Women's 200 metre backstroke, she broke the South American record, with a time of 2:11.95, finishing 4th. In the women's 4 × 100 metre medley relay, she won a bronze medal, by participating in the heats. She also finished 5th in the women's 100 metre backstroke and 7th in the women's 400 metre individual medley.
