= Chen Szu-chi =

Taiwanese swimmer

Personal information
- Born: 20 June 2002 (age 24)

Sport
- Sport: Swimming

Chen Szu-chi (born 20 June 2002) is a Taiwanese swimmer. She competed in the women's 50 metre backstroke event at the 2017 World Aquatics Championships. At the 2016 Asian Swimming Championships, she set a national record for the 50m backstroke, with a time of 29.23.

In 2018, she competed in the girls' 50 metre backstroke event at the 2018 Summer Youth Olympics held in Buenos Aires, Argentina. She did not qualify to compete in the semi-finals. She also competed in the 100 metre and 200 metre events.
