= Cyprus at the 2018 Summer Youth Olympics =

- IOC code: CYP
- NOC: Cyprus Olympic Committee
- Website: http://www.olympic.org.cy/

in Buenos Aires, Argentina 6 – 18 October 2018
- Competitors: 6 in 6 sports
- Flag bearer: Kalia Antoniou
- Medals: Gold 0 Silver 0 Bronze 0 Total 0

Summer Youth Olympics appearances
- 2010; 2014; 2018; 2026

Cyprus participated at the 2018 Summer Youth Olympics in Buenos Aires, Argentina from 6 October to 18 October 2018.

== Athletics ==
Boys
Field events

Athlete	Event	Stage 1		Stage 2		Total	
Athlete	Event	Distance	Rank	Distance	Rank	Total	Rank
Nikolaos Kesidis	Hammer throw	63.59	15	66.62	13	130.21	13

== Dancesport ==
Cyprus qualified one dancer based on its performance at the 2018 World Youth Breaking Championship.

Athlete	Event	Preliminary				Quarterfinals	Semifinals	Final / BB	
Athlete	Event	Opposition Score	Opposition Score	Opposition Score	Rank	Opposition Score	Opposition Score	Opposition Score	Rank
Irene Tanou (Ivy)	B-Girls'	Ella (AUT); 2–0	Matina (RUS); 2–0	Lexy (ITA); 2–0	2 Q	Yell (KOR); L 0–4	did not advance		6
Ivy (CYP); D-Matt (CAN)	Mixed team	Ram (JPN); B4 (VIE); 0–2	Ella (AUT); Bumblebee (RUS); 0–2	Lexy (ITA); Broly (ARG); 0–2	12	did not advance			

== Gymnastics ==
=== Rhythmic ===
Cyprus qualified one rhythmic gymnast based on its performance at the European qualification event.

Athlete	Event	Qualification						Final					
Athlete	Event	Hoop	Ball	Clubs	Ribbon	Total	Rank	Hoop	Ball	Clubs	Ribbon	Total	Rank
Anastasia Pingou	All-around	10.350	12.800	13.075	11.650	47.875	28	did not advance					

=== Multidiscipline ===
Team	Athlete	Acrobatic	Artistic	Rhythmic	Trampoline	Total points	Rank
Yevgeny Marchenko (Brown)	Daniela González (PUR); Adriel González (PUR)	36	—N/a			430	10
Yevgeny Marchenko (Brown)	Byun Seong-won (KOR)	—N/a	45	—N/a		430	10
Yevgeny Marchenko (Brown)	Lay Giannini (ITA)	—N/a	55	—N/a		430	10
Yevgeny Marchenko (Brown)	Víctor Betancourt (VEN)	—N/a	54	—N/a		430	10
Yevgeny Marchenko (Brown)	Kate Sayer (AUS)	—N/a	36	—N/a		430	10
Yevgeny Marchenko (Brown)	Elvira Katsali (GRE)	—N/a	89	—N/a		430	10
Yevgeny Marchenko (Brown)	Valeriia Sotskova (ISR)	—N/a		26	—N/a	430	10
Yevgeny Marchenko (Brown)	Anastasia Pingou (CYP)	—N/a		20	—N/a	430	10
Yevgeny Marchenko (Brown)	Ekaterina Fetisova (UZB)	—N/a		39	—N/a	430	10
Yevgeny Marchenko (Brown)	Fu Fantao (CHN)	—N/a			8	430	10
Yevgeny Marchenko (Brown)	Alyssa Oh (USA)	—N/a			12	430	10

== Judo ==
Individual

Athlete	Event	Round of 16	Quarterfinals	Semifinals	Rep 1	Rep 2	Rep 3	Final / BM	
Athlete	Event	Opposition Result	Opposition Result	Opposition Result	Opposition Result	Opposition Result	Opposition Result	Opposition Result	Rank
Georgios Balarjishvili	Boys' -66 kg	Nazarov (UZB); L 00s1–10	did not advance		Jashari (MKD); L 00s2–01	did not advance			13

Team

Athletes	Event	Round of 16	Quarterfinals	Semifinals	Final	
Athletes	Event	Opposition Result	Opposition Result	Opposition Result	Opposition Result	Rank
Team Los Angeles; Soniya Bhatta (NEP); Ariel Shulman (ISR); Nahomys Acosta Batte (CUB); Turpal Djoukaev (FIN); Saskia Brothers (AUS); Georgios Balarjishvili (CYP); Raffaela Igl (GER); Alin Bagrin (MDA)	Mixed team	Team Seoul (MIX); W 5–3	Team Athens (MIX); L 3–5	did not advance		5

== Swimming ==
Girls

Athlete	Event	Heats		Semifinals		Final	
Athlete	Event	Time	Rank	Time	Rank	Time	Rank
Kalia Antoniou	50 m freestyle	25.86	7 Q	25.95	12	did not advance	
Kalia Antoniou	100 m freestyle	56.76	12 Q	56.63	10	did not advance	
Kalia Antoniou	50 m backstroke	29.91	19	did not advance			
Alexandra Schegoleva	50 m butterfly	27.85 (27.94*)	=16 (18*)	did not advance			
Alexandra Schegoleva	100 m butterfly	1:03.55	27	did not advance			

*Alexandra Schegoleva's heat time was tied with 2 other swimmers in 16th place, which led to a swim-off for the last qualification spot. She finished third, therefore 18th overall.
