= Boxing at the 2018 Summer Youth Olympics – Boys' super heavyweight =

Boxing competitions

Boys' super heavyweight boxing at the III Summer Youth Olympic Games
- Venue: Oceania Pavilion
- Date: 14–17 October
- Competitors: 6 from 6 nations

Medalists
1st place, gold medalist(s)		Aleksei Dronov	Russia
2nd place, silver medalist(s)		Damir Toibay	Kazakhstan
3rd place, bronze medalist(s)		Ahmed Elsawy	Egypt

The boys' super heavyweight boxing competition at the 2018 Summer Youth Olympics in Buenos Aires was held from 14 to 17 October at the Oceania Pavilion.

== Schedule ==
All times are local (UTC−3).

Date	Time	Round
Sunday, 14 October	15:02	Preliminary Round 1
Monday, 15 October	14:43	Preliminary Round 2
Tuesday, 16 October	15:02	Semifinals
Wednesday, 17 October	15:13	Finals

== Results ==
Preliminary Round 1
Jai Dennis (AUS)
Ahmed Elsawy (EGY)	RSC
Tethluach Chuol (CAN)	5
Vaisilika Tuigamala (SAM)	0

Preliminary Round 2
Aleksei Dronov (RUS)	5
Jai Dennis (AUS)	0
Vaisilika Tuigamala (SAM)
Damir Toibay (KAZ)	WO

Semifinals
Ahmed Elsawy (EGY)	0
Aleksei Dronov (RUS)	5
Damir Toibay (KAZ)	5
Tethluach Chuol (CAN)	0

Final
Aleksei Dronov (RUS)	4
Damir Toibay (KAZ)	1
Third place
Ahmed Elsawy (EGY)	5
Tethluach Chuol (CAN)	0

== Final standings ==
Rank	Athlete
1st place, gold medalist(s)	Aleksei Dronov (RUS)
2nd place, silver medalist(s)	Damir Toibay (KAZ)
3rd place, bronze medalist(s)	Ahmed Elsawy (EGY)
4	Tethluach Chuol (CAN)
5	Jai Dennis (AUS)
6	Vaisilika Tuigamala (SAM)
