= Aleksei Dronov =

Russian boxer

Personal information
- Born: December 17, 2001 (age 24) Russia
- Height: 6 ft 4 1/2 in (194 cm)

Boxing career
- Stance: Southpaw
Medal record
Men's amateur boxing
Representing Russia
Youth Olympic Games
Gold medal – first place	2018 Buenos Aires	Super-heavyweight
Youth World Championships
Gold medal – first place	2018 Budapest	Super-heavyweight
European Youth Championships
Gold medal – first place	2018 Roseto	Super-heavyweight

Aleksei Dronov (Russian: Алексей Алексеевич Дронов; born December 17, 2001), is a Russian amateur boxer who won gold medals at the 2018 Youth Olympics, Youth World Championships, and European Youth Championships, all in the super-heavyweight division.
