= Chelsea Hodges =

Australian swimmer (born 2001)

Chelsea Hodges OAM
Personal information
- Full name: Chelsea Mae Hodges
- Nationality: Australian
- Born: 27 June 2001 (age 25) Queensland, Australia

Sport
- Sport: Swimming
Medal record
Women's swimming
Representing Australia
Olympic Games
Gold medal – first place	2020 Tokyo	4×100 m medley
World Championships (SC)
Gold medal – first place	2022 Melbourne	4×50 m medley
Silver medal – second place	2022 Melbourne	4×100 m medley
Commonwealth Games
Gold medal – first place	2022 Birmingham	4×100 m medley
Bronze medal – third place	2022 Birmingham	50 m breaststroke
Bronze medal – third place	2022 Birmingham	100 m breaststroke
Universiade
Bronze medal – third place	2019 Naples	50 m breaststroke
Youth Olympic Games
Silver medal – second place	2018 Buenos Aires	50 m breaststroke
Silver medal – second place	2018 Buenos Aires	4×100 m medley

Chelsea Mae Hodges OAM (born 27 June 2001) is a retired Australian swimmer. She competed in the women's 100 metre breaststroke at the 2020 Summer Olympics.

== Career ==
At the 2020 Summer Olympics in Tokyo, Hodges was a semi-finalist in the Women's 100 metre breaststroke swimming the ninth fastest time (1:06.60) and just missing the final by 0.01 second.

Hodges later swam the breaststroke leg of the Women's 4 × 100 metre medley relay for the gold medal winning Australian team. Hodges was up against American 100m breaststroke gold medalist Lydia Jacoby and despite being 1.65 seconds slower than Jacoby in the individual event Hodges posted a time of 1:05.57 in the final of the relay which was only 0.54 seconds slower than the American. Hodges' breaststroke leg kept the Australians within striking distance of the Americans and with Emma McKeon narrowing the gap Cate Campbell was able to touch the wall first ahead of American Abbey Weitzeil to win the gold medal for Australia.

In the 2022 Australia Day Honours, Hodges was awarded the Medal of the Order of Australia.

== World records ==
=== Short course metres ===
No.	Event	Time	Meet	Location	Date	Status	Ref
1	4x50 m medley relay^{[a]}	1:42.35	2022 World Championships (25 m)	Melbourne, Australia	17 December 2022	Current	

^{a} split 29.11 (breaststroke leg); with Mollie O'Callaghan (backstroke leg), Emma McKeon (butterfly leg), Madison Wilson (freestyle leg)

== Olympic records ==
=== Long course metres ===
No.	Event	Time	Meet	Location	Date	Status	Notes	Ref
1	4x100 m medley relay^{[a]}	3:51.60	2020 Summer Olympics	Tokyo, Japan	1 August 2021	Former	OC, NR	

Legend: WR – World record; OC – Oceanian record; NR – Australian record;
Records not set in finals: h – heat; sf – semifinal; r – relay 1st leg; rh – relay heat 1st leg; b – B final; † – en route to final mark; so – swim-off; tt – time trial

^{a} split 1:05.57 for breaststroke leg; with Kaylee McKeown (backstroke leg), Emma McKeon (butterfly), Cate Campbell (freestyle)
