= Rhyan White =

American swimmer (born 2000)

Personal information
- Full name: Rhyan Elizabeth White
- Nationality: United States
- Born: January 25, 2000 (age 26) Herriman, Utah, U.S.
- Height: 5 ft 6 in (168 cm)

Sport
- Sport: Swimming
- Strokes: Backstroke, butterfly, individual medley
- College team: University of Alabama
Medal record
Women's swimming
Representing the United States
Olympic Games
Silver medal – second place	2020 Tokyo	4×100 m medley
World Championships (LC)
Gold medal – first place	2022 Budapest	4×100 m medley
Bronze medal – third place	2022 Budapest	200 m backstroke
World Championships (SC)
Gold medal – first place	2021 Abu Dhabi	200 m backstroke
Silver medal – second place	2021 Abu Dhabi	4×50 m medley
Youth Olympic Games
Bronze medal – third place	2018 Buenos Aires	100 m backstroke

Rhyan Elizabeth White (born January 25, 2000) is an American swimmer. She won a silver medal in the 4x100-meter medley relay at the 2020 Summer Olympics for her contribution in the prelims of the event and placed fourth in both the 100-meter backstroke and the 200-meter backstroke. At the 2020 Olympics, White also became the first Utah-born swimmer to compete in an Olympic Games. At the 2018 Summer Youth Olympics, she was the only swimmer representing the United States to win a medal. She won her first world title in the 200-meter backstroke at the 2021 World Short Course Championships.

== Early life and education ==
White was born and raised in Herriman, Utah. While attending Cottonwood High School in Murray, Utah, she swam for her high school swim team, winning UHSAA state swimming championships titles in the 100-yard butterfly, 100-yard backstroke, and 200-yard individual medley. She graduated from Academy for Math, Engineering, and Science, which is physically contained within Cottonwood High School.

White committed to competing collegiately for the University of Alabama in 2017 and started swimming for the school in the autumn of 2018. She currently attends and swims for the University of Alabama, where she is majoring in psychology.

== Swimming career ==
=== 2016 US Olympic trials ===
At the 2016 US Olympic trials in swimming, White competed in two events. She finished in 18th place overall in the 200-meter backstroke with a time of 2:12.36, and 61st overall with a time of 1:02.82 in the 100-meter backstroke.

=== 2018 Summer Youth Olympics ===
White was the only American swimmer to win a medal of any type, gold, silver, or bronze, at the 2018 Summer Youth Olympics in Buenos Aires, Argentina, winning the bronze medal in the 100-meter backstroke with a time of 1:00.60. With the one bronze medal White won, the United States tied with Egypt, Spain, and South Korea for 30th-place in the medal table for swimming at the 2018 Youth Olympics.

=== 2020 US Olympic trials ===
In June 2021 at the US Olympic trials in Omaha, Nebraska, White became the first woman from the University of Alabama to win any event at a US Olympic trials in swimming when she won the 200-meter backstroke. White qualified for the 2020 US Olympic swim team with her first-place finish in the 200-meter backstroke, with a time of 2:05.73, and her second-place finish in the 100-meter backstroke with a time of 58.60.

=== 2020 Summer Olympics ===
2020 Summer Olympics
Silver medal – second place	4x100 m medley relay	3:51.73

The 2020 Summer Olympics in Tokyo, Japan were the first Olympic Games White made the US Olympic team. She became the third female athlete from the University of Alabama to make the US Olympic team in any sport, and the first female swimmer from the school.

White was the first swimmer from Utah to compete in an Olympic Games. Her first race at an Olympic Games was in the prelims of the 100-meter backstroke where she swam a 59.02, ranked sixth overall, and advanced to the semifinals. She advanced to the final from the semifinals where she swam a 58.46 and ranked fourth. In the final, White swam a 58.43 and finished in fourth place less than half a second after the third-place finisher and bronze medalist, American Regan Smith.

On day six of competition, White tied for second overall in the prelims heats of the 200-meter backstroke with a time of 2:08.23 and advanced to the semifinals. In the semifinals on day seven, White swam the third fastest time for both semifinal heats with a time of 2:07.28 and qualified for the final of the 200 meter backstroke the following day. Later in the day, White swam the backstroke leg of the 4x100-meter medley relay, contributing to the relay ranking second for all prelims heats and qualifying for the final.

In the morning on day eight, White placed fourth in the final of the 200-meter backstroke with her time of 2:06.39.

On the ninth and final day, the finals relay of the 4x100-meter medley relay finished second and White won a silver medal for her swim as part of the prelims relay in the event.

=== 2021 World Short Course Championships ===
2021 World Championships
Gold medal – first place	200 m backstroke	2:01.58
Silver medal – second place	4×50 m medley	1:43.61

White entered to compete in three individual events, the 50-meter, 100-meter, and 200-meter backstroke, at the 2021 World Short Course Championships in Abu Dhabi, United Arab Emirates in December. In the prelims heats of the 100-meter backstroke on day one, White advanced to the semifinals with a time of 56.76 seconds, which ranked her fifth overall. She tied Kira Toussaint of the Netherlands for second-rank in the semifinals with a time of 56.05 seconds and qualified for the final. On the second day of competition, White helped win a silver medal in the 4×50-meter medley relay with finals relay teammates Lydia Jacoby, Claire Curzan, and Abbey Weitzeil, contributing a 26.33 backstroke split to the final time of 1:43.61. Later in the same session, White placed fifth in the final of the 100-meter backstroke with a 55.87. The following morning, White swam a 2:04.08 in the prelims heats of the 200-meter backstroke and qualified for the final ranking second overall. In the evening, White won the gold medal in the 200-meter backstroke with a 2:01.58. White's win was her first world title and the first individual gold medal won by a swimmer from the University of Alabama swim program at a World Championships. Day four, White decided not to swim the 50-meter backstroke. She officially withdrew from competition alongside teammates MIchael Andrew and Michael Brinegar the same day.

=== 2022 collegiate championships ===
==== 2022 Southeastern Conference Championships ====
Day one of the 2022 Southeastern Conference Championships in February 2022, White helped win the 4×50 yard medley relay for the Alabama Crimson Tide in a time of 1:33.94 by splitting a 23.65 on the backstroke leg of the relay. The relay's time of 1:33.94 set a new Southeastern Conference record. The third day, she qualified for the final of the 100 yard butterfly with a rank of fourth and time of 51.76 in the prelims heats. She placed second in the final with a 51.19, finishing 0.85 seconds after first-place finisher Ellen Walshe. The next day, White advanced to the final of the 100 yard backstroke with a time of 51.08 seconds in the prelims heats. In the final, she set a new pool record with her first-place time of 50.18 seconds. Later in the session, she split a 50.44 on the backstroke leg of the 4×100 yard medley relay to help win in a time of 3:26.64. On the fifth and final day, she ranked first in the prelims heats of the 200 yard backstroke with a 1:51.57. She lowered her time to a 1:50.22 in the final to win the event by over half a second.

==== 2022 NCAA Championships ====
Starting off on the first day of the 2022 NCAA Championships, March 16, White swam a 23.35 for the backstroke portion of the 4×50 yard medley relay to help achieve a fourth-place finish in 1:33.29. On the third day of competition, she qualified for the final of the 100 yard backstroke ranking fourth with a time of 50.65 seconds after qualifying for the b-final of the 100 yard butterfly with a time of 51.27 seconds that ranked her tenth overall. Racing the events in the evening finals session, she placed second with a 50.85 in the b-final of the 100 yard butterfly and fourth in the 100 yard backstroke in 50.34 seconds. In her third final of the day, White contributed to a sixth-place finish in the 4×100 yard medley relay, swimming the backstroke portion of the relay in 50.89 seconds. The final day of competition, she qualified for the final of the 200 yard backstroke with a time of 1:50.36 in the prelims heats. For the final, she swam a 1:49.36 and placed third.

== Physique ==
White's coach from when she competed at Cottonwood High School partially attributed White's speed to her ability to naturally hyperextend her knees in such a way that provided heightened mobility.

== Awards and honors ==
- Southeastern Conference (SEC), Female Swimmer of the Year: 2020—2021
- Southeastern Conference (SEC), Commissioner's Trophy: 2020—2021
- SwimSwam, Top 100 (Women's): 2022 (#36)
- Southeastern Conference (SEC), Female Swimmer of the Week: January 18, 2022

== See also ==
- List of World Swimming Championships (25 m) medalists (women)
- List of 2020 Summer Olympics medal winners
