= Elizaveta Klevanovich =

Russian swimmer (born 2001)

Personal information
- Nationality: Russia
- Born: 22 March 2001 (age 25) Tyumen, Russia

Sport
- Sport: Swimming
Medal record
Women's swimming
Representing Russia
European Championships (SC)
Gold medal – first place	2019 Glasgow	4×50 m mixed freestyle
Universiade
Bronze medal – third place	2019 Naples	4x200 m freestyle
Youth Olympic Games
Gold medal – first place	2018 Buenos Aires	4×100 m freestyle
Gold medal – first place	2018 Buenos Aires	4×100 m mixed freestyle
Silver medal – second place	2018 Buenos Aires	4×100 m mixed medley
Bronze medal – third place	2018 Buenos Aires	4×100 m medley

Elizaveta Nikolayevna Klevanovich (Russian: Елизавета Николаевна Клеванович; born 22 March 2001) is a Russian swimmer. She competed in the 2020 Summer Olympics.

In September 2023, Klevanovich signed to attend the Auburn University and compete for the Auburn Tigers swim team.
