= Lin Xintong =

Chinese swimmer (born 2000)

Personal information
- Born: 4 July 2000 (age 25)

Sport
- Sport: Swimming
- Strokes: Butterfly
Medal record
Women's swimming
Representing China
Asian Games
Bronze medal – third place	2018 Jakarta	50 m butterfly
Summer Youth Olympics
Gold medal – first place	2018 Buenos Aires	4×100 m medley
Gold medal – first place	2018 Buenos Aires	Mixed 4×100 m medley
Bronze medal – third place	2018 Buenos Aires	Mixed 4×100 m freestyle

Lin Xintong (born 4 July 2000) is a Chinese swimmer. She competed in the women's 50 metre butterfly event at the 2018 Asian Games, winning the bronze medal.
