= Weronika Hallmann =

Polish swimmer

Personal information
- Nationality: Polish
- Born: 20 July 2000 (age 25)

Sport
- Sport: Swimming
Medal record
Representing Poland
European Junior Championships
Silver medal – second place	2017 Netanya	50m breaststroke
Bronze medal – third place	2017 Netanya	4x100m medley relay

Weronika Hallmann (born 20 July 2000) is a Polish swimmer. She competed in the women's 200 metre breaststroke at the 2019 World Aquatics Championships.

In 2017, she won the silver medal in the girls' 50 metre breaststroke at the 2017 European Junior Swimming Championships held in Netanya, Israel.
