= Polina Egorova =

Russian butterfly and backstroke swimmer

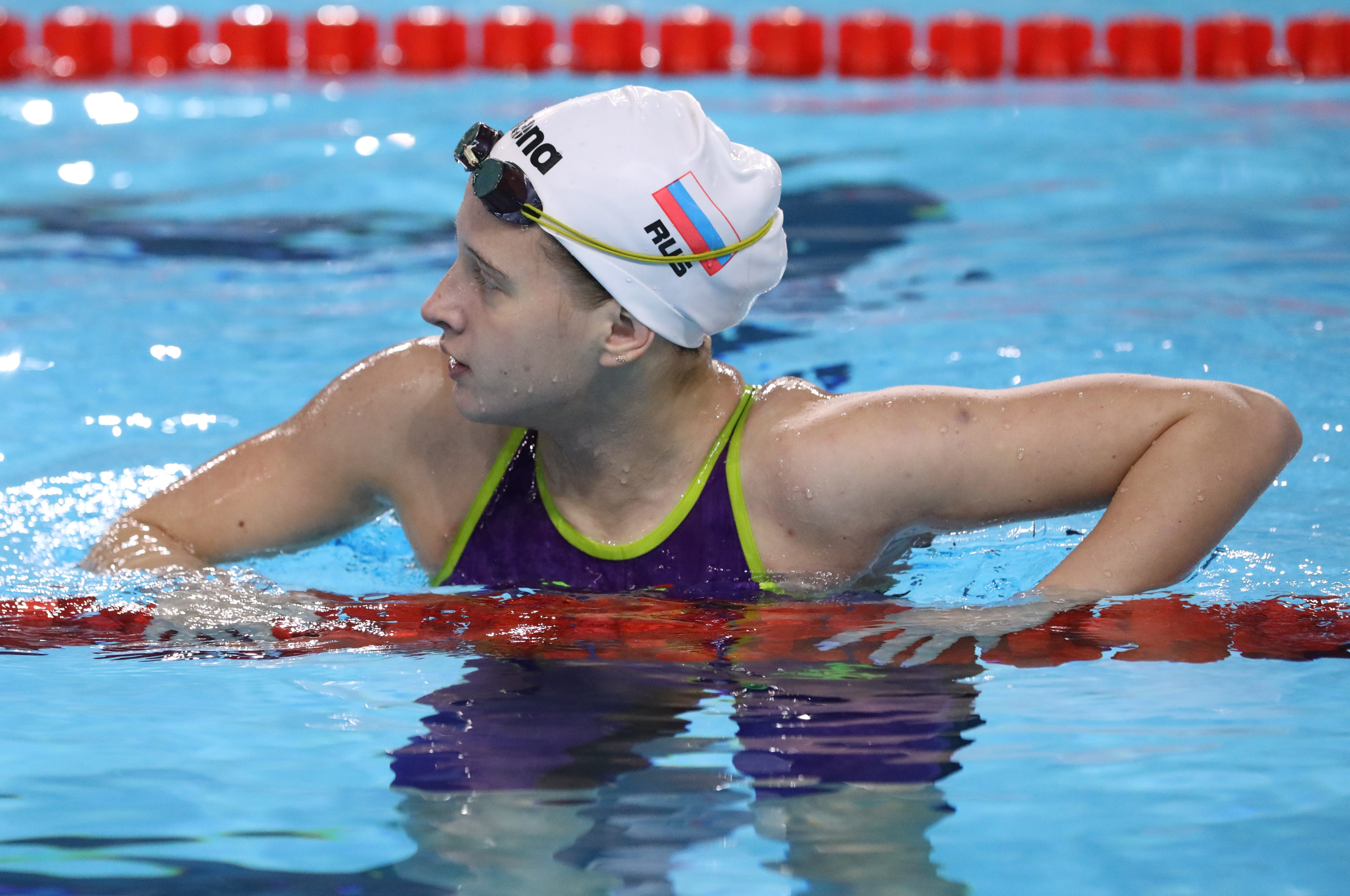
- Egorova at the 2018 Summer Youth Olympics

Personal information
- Native name: Полина Алексеевна Егорова
- Nationality: Russia
- Born: 25 February 2000 (age 26) Salavat, Russia
- Height: 1.68 m (5 ft 6 in)
- Weight: 52 kg (115 lb)

Sport
- Sport: Swimming
- Coach: Hanif Shafikov
Medal record
Women's swimming
Representing Russia
European Games
Gold medal – first place	2015 Baku	100 m backstroke
Gold medal – first place	2015 Baku	200 m backstroke
Gold medal – first place	2015 Baku	50 m butterfly
Gold medal – first place	2015 Baku	100 m butterfly
Gold medal – first place	2015 Baku	4×100 m freestyle
Gold medal – first place	2015 Baku	4×100 m medley
Summer Youth Olympics
Gold medal – first place	2018 Buenos Aires	4×100 m mixed freestyle
Gold medal – first place	2018 Buenos Aires	4×100 m freestyle
Gold medal – first place	2018 Buenos Aires	100 m butterfly
Bronze medal – third place	2018 Buenos Aires	50 m butterfly
Bronze medal – third place	2018 Buenos Aires	4×100 m medley relay

Polina Alexeyevna Egorova (Russian: Полина Алексеевна Егорова; born on 25 February 2000) is a Russian butterfly and backstroke swimmer. She is two-time Youth Olympic Games champion (2018) and six-time European Games champion (2015).

== Career ==
Polina was born in Salavat, Bashkortostan. Her first coach is Hanif Skafikov.

Polina competed at the 2015 European Games in Baku, Azerbaijan. She became a six-time champion, won gold medals in 100 and 200 m backstroke, 50 and 100 m butterfly and two-times in relays.
