= Tennis at the 2018 Summer Youth Olympics =

- Date: 7–14 October
- Edition: 3rd
- Location: Buenos Aires Lawn Tennis Club

Champions

Mixed doubles
- Yuki Naito / Naoki Tajima (JPN)

Boys' singles
- Hugo Gaston (FRA)

Girls' singles
- Kaja Juvan (SLO)

Boys' doubles
- Sebastián Báez (ARG) / Facundo Díaz Acosta (ARG)

Girls' doubles
- Kaja Juvan (SLO) / Iga Świątek (POL)
- Youth Olympic Games

Tennis at the 2018 Summer Youth Olympics was held on 7–14 October. The events took place at the Buenos Aires Lawn Tennis Club in Buenos Aires, Argentina.

== Qualification ==
Each National Olympic Committee (NOC) can enter a maximum of 4 competitors, 2 per each gender. As hosts, Argentina is given 2 quotas, 1 per each gender should they not qualify normally and a further 6 competitors, 3 per each gender will be decided by the Tripartite Commission.

The remaining 56 places shall be decided by the ITF World Junior Rankings, ATP rankings, WTA rankings update on 16 July 2018. The first 12 spots per each gender will go to the top ranked athletes in the ITF World Junior Rankings. The next 10 spots per gender will go to any eligible athlete ranked in the top 450 in the ATP rankings for boys and the top 200 in the WTA rankings for girls. Should any spots remain they will be reallocated to the top ranked athletes in the ITF World Junior Rankings. The remaining 6 spots per gender will go to the best ranked athlete from the ITF World Junior Rankings from any of the six regional associations not yet represented. Should any spots remain they will be reallocated to the next best ranked athlete in the ITF World Rankings, regardless of region.

To be eligible to participate at the Youth Olympics athletes must have been born between 1 January 2000 and 31 December 2003. Furthermore, all qualified players will take place in the doubles and mixed doubles events.

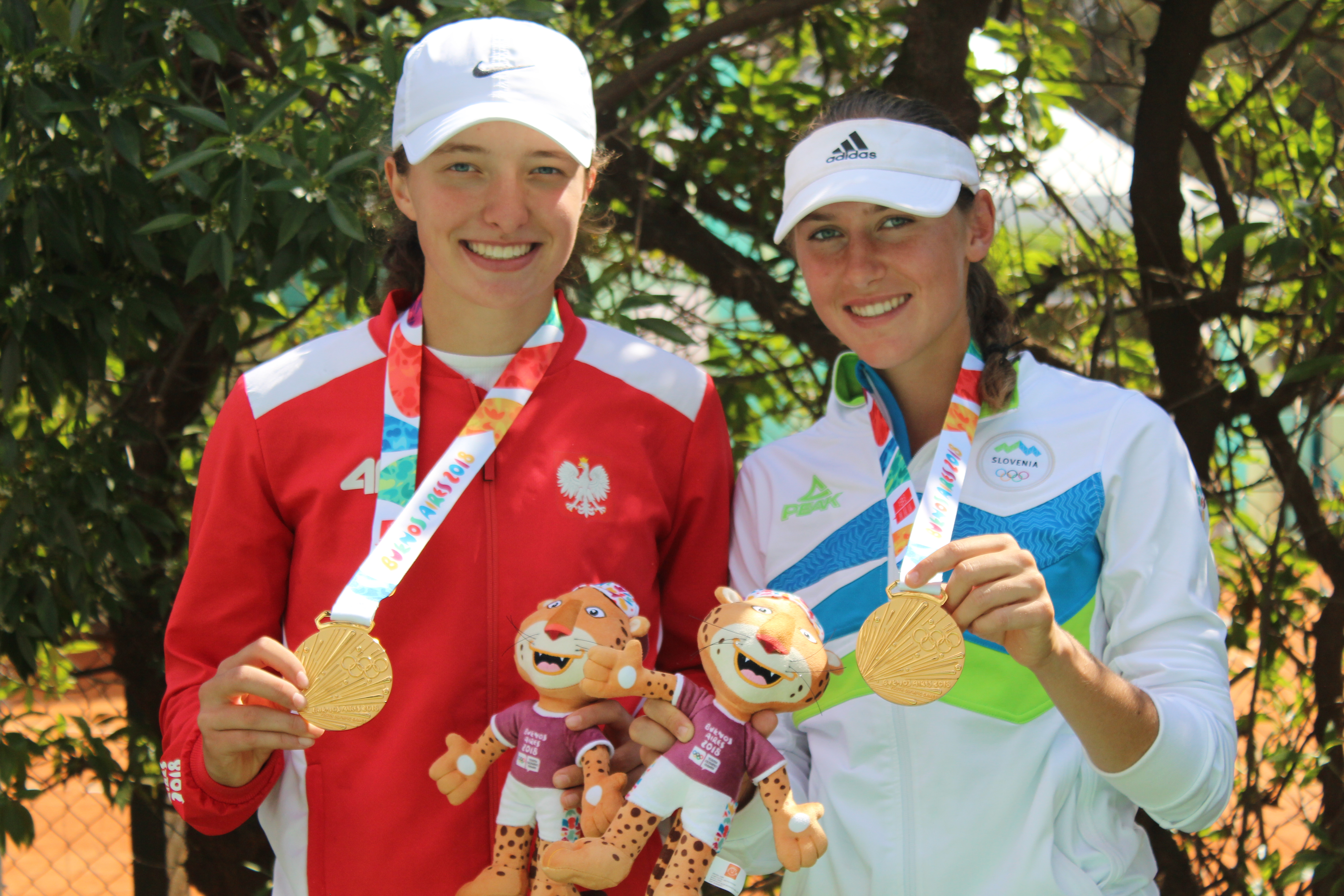
Iga Świątek (left) and Kaja Juvan, the gold medallists in girls' doubles

=== Boys ===
Rankings	Breakdown	Date	Total places	Qualified
ITF World Junior Rankings	Top Athletes	10 August 2018	21	Tseng Chun-hsin (TPE); Sebastián Báez (ARG); Nicolás Mejía (COL); Hugo Gaston (FRA); Adrian Andreev (BUL); Naoki Tajima (JPN); Facundo Díaz Acosta (ARG); Tristan Boyer (USA); Carlos López Montagud (ESP); Mu Tao (CHN); Filip Cristian Jianu (ROU); Yankı Erel (TUR); Lorenzo Musetti (ITA); Dalibor Svrčina (CZE); Drew Baird (USA); Clément Tabur (FRA); Marko Miladinović (SRB); Ray Ho (TPE); Ondřej Štyler (CZE); Arnaud Bovy (BEL); Gilbert Soares Klier Júnior (BRA)
Reallocation place	Top Athletes	10 August 2018	5	Nicolás Álvarez Varona (ESP); Damien Wenger (SUI); Daniel Michalski (POL); Jesper de Jong (NED); Dostanbek Tashbulatov (KAZ)
Africa Regional place	Top Athletes	10 August 2018	1	Philip Henning (RSA)
Central America Regional place	Top Athletes	10 August 2018	1	Nick Hardt (DOM)
Oceania Regional place	Top Athletes	10 August 2018	1	Rinky Hijikata (AUS)
Universality place	Top Athletes	10 August 2018	3	Patrick Sydow (ARU); Delmas N'tcha (BEN); Ali Dawani (BHR)
TOTAL			32	

=== Girls ===
Rankings	Breakdown	Date	Total places	Qualified
ITF World Junior Rankings	Top Athletes	10 August 2018	21	Wang Xinyu (CHN); Liang En-shuo (TPE); Wang Xiyu (CHN); Alexa Noel (USA); Camila Osorio (COL); Iga Świątek (POL); Eléonora Molinaro (LUX); Yuki Naito (JPN); Naho Sato (JPN); María Lourdes Carlé (ARG); Elisabetta Cocciaretto (ITA); Clara Burel (FRA); Joanna Garland (TPE); Lea Ma (USA); Viktoriia Dema (UKR); Margaryta Bilokin (UKR); Lulu Sun (SUI); Kamilla Rakhimova (RUS); Diane Parry (FRA); Viktoryia Kanapatskaya (BLR); Ana Makatsaria (GEO)
Reallocation place	Top Athletes	10 August 2018	6	Daniela Vismane (LAT); Kaja Juvan (SLO); Oksana Selekhmeteva (RUS); Selma Ștefania Cadar (ROU); Georgia Drummy (IRL); Thasaporn Naklo (THA)
Africa Regional place	Top Athletes	10 August 2018	1	Sada Nahimana (BDI)
Central America Regional place	Top Athletes	10 August 2018	1	María Gabriela Rivera Corado (GUA)
Oceania Regional place	Top Athletes	10 August 2018	1	Valentina Ivanov (NZL)
Universality place	Top Athletes	10 August 2018	2	Francesca Curmi (MLT); Sylvie Zünd (LIE)
TOTAL			32	

== Medal summary ==
=== Medal table ===
* Host nation (Argentina)

Rank	Nation	Gold	Silver	Bronze	Total
1	France	1	1	2	4
2	Argentina*	1	1	0	2
2	Japan	1	1	0	2
–	Mixed-NOCs	1	1	0	2
4	Slovenia	1	0	0	1
5	Colombia	0	1	1	2
6	Brazil	0	0	1	1
6	China	0	0	1	1
Totals (7 entries)		5	5	5	15

- Note: Medals for mixed teams have not been counted towards their individual nation.

=== Events ===
Event	Gold	Silver	Bronze
Boys' singles	Hugo Gaston; France	Facundo Díaz Acosta; Argentina	Gilbert Soares Klier Júnior; Brazil
Boys' doubles	Sebastián Báez; Argentina; Facundo Díaz Acosta; Argentina	Adrian Andreev; Bulgaria; Rinky Hijikata; Australia	Hugo Gaston; France; Clément Tabur; France
Girls' singles	Kaja Juvan; Slovenia	Clara Burel; France	Camila Osorio; Colombia
Girls' doubles	Kaja Juvan; Slovenia; Iga Świątek; Poland	Yuki Naito; Japan; Naho Sato; Japan	Wang Xinyu; China; Wang Xiyu; China
Mixed doubles	Yuki Naito; Japan; Naoki Tajima; Japan	Camila Osorio; Colombia; Nicolás Mejía; Colombia	Clara Burel; France; Hugo Gaston; France

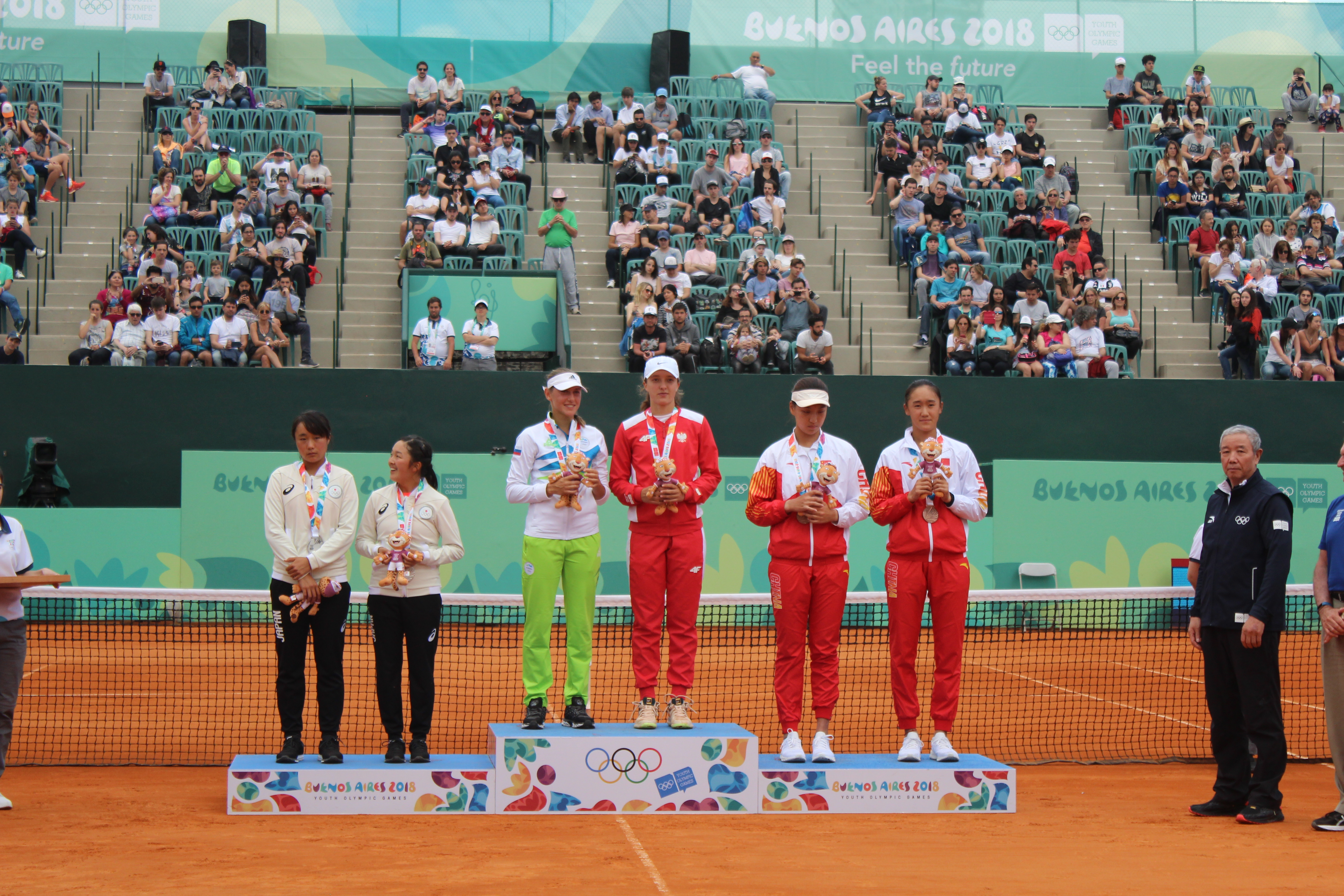
Girls doubles podium.
