= Tennis at the 2018 Summer Youth Olympics – Mixed doubles =

Mixed doubles at the III Summer Youth Olympic Games
- Venue: Buenos Aires Lawn Tennis Club
- Date: 9–14 October
- Competitors: 64 from 40 nations

Medalists
1st place, gold medalist(s)		Yuki Naito; Naoki Tajima; Japan
2nd place, silver medalist(s)		Camila Osorio; Nicolás Mejía; Colombia
3rd place, bronze medalist(s)		Clara Burel; Hugo Gaston; France

Mixed doubles
- Tennis at the 2018 Summer Youth Olympics

Events
Singles	boys	girls
Doubles	boys	girls	mixed
← 2014 ·	Summer Youth Olympics	· 2022 →

These are the results for the mixed doubles event at the 2018 Summer Youth Olympics.

== Seeds ==
1. Clara Burel (FRA) / Hugo Gaston (FRA) (semifinals, Bronze medallist)
2. Camila Osorio (COL) / Nicolás Mejía (COL) (final, Silver medallist)
3. Joanna Garland (TPE) / Tseng Chun-hsin (TPE) (quarterfinals)
4. Elisabetta Cocciaretto (ITA) / Lorenzo Musetti (ITA) (second round)
5. Kaja Juvan (SLO) / Marko Miladinović (SRB) (quarterfinals)
6. Alexa Noel (USA) / Tristan Boyer (USA) (first round)
7. Wang Xinyu (CHN) / Mu Tao (CHN) (second round)
8. Naho Sato (JPN) / Gilbert Soares Klier Júnior (BRA) (second round)

== Main draw ==
=== Key ===
- Q = Qualifier
- WC = Wild card
- LL = Lucky loser
- Alt = Alternate
- ITF = ITF entry
- PR = Protected ranking
- SR = Special ranking
- SE = Special exempt
- JE = Junior exempt
- JR = Junior Accelerator Programme entrant
- CO = College Accelerator Programme entrant
- NG = Next Gen Accelerator Program entrant
- w/o = Walkover
- r = Retired
- d = Defaulted

=== Finals ===
Semifinals
1	Clara Burel (FRA); Hugo Gaston (FRA)	1	5
Yuki Naito (JPN); Naoki Tajima (JPN)	6	7
Lulu Sun (SUI); Damien Wenger (SUI)	3	6^{4}
2	Camila Osorio (COL); Nicolás Mejía (COL)	6	7^{7}

Gold medal match
Yuki Naito (JPN); Naoki Tajima (JPN)	6	6
2	Camila Osorio (COL); Nicolás Mejía (COL)	2	3
Bronze medal match
1	Clara Burel (FRA); Hugo Gaston (FRA)	6	5	[10]
Lulu Sun (SUI); Damien Wenger (SUI)	4	7	[4]

=== Top half ===
First round
1	C Burel (FRA); H Gaston (FRA)	4	6	[10]
K Rakhimova (RUS); O Štyler (CZE)	6	4	[8]
S Zünd (LIE); N Álvarez Varona (ESP)	4	2
ML Carlé (ARG); S Báez (ARG)	6	6
T Naklo (THA); A Dawani (BHR)	0	1
S Nahimana (BDI); P Henning (RSA)	6	6
V Kanapatskaya (BLR); A Bovy (BEL)	4	4
5	K Juvan (SLO); M Miladinović (SRB)	6	6
3	J Garland (TPE); C-h Tseng (TPE)	6	3	[10]
F Curmi (MLT); F Díaz Acosta (ARG)	2	6	[3]
MG Rivera Corado (GUA); N Hardt (DOM)	3	6	[10]
V Ivanov (NZL); R Hijikata (AUS)	6	4	[7]
A Makatsaria (GEO); P Sydow (ARU)	0	1
Y Naito (JPN); N Tajima (JPN)	6	6
I Świątek (POL); D Michalski (POL)	6	6
6	A Noel (USA); T Boyer (USA)	1	4

Second round
1	C Burel (FRA); H Gaston (FRA)	7	4	[10]
ML Carlé (ARG); S Báez (ARG)	5	6	[8]
S Nahimana (BDI); P Henning (RSA)	2	6	[8]
5	K Juvan (SLO); M Miladinović (SRB)	6	4	[10]
3	J Garland (TPE); C-h Tseng (TPE)	6	6
MG Rivera Corado (GUA); N Hardt (DOM)	4	2
Y Naito (JPN); N Tajima (JPN)
I Świątek (POL); D Michalski (POL)	w/o

Quarterfinals
1	C Burel (FRA); H Gaston (FRA)	6	5	[11]
5	K Juvan (SLO); M Miladinović (SRB)	2	7	[9]
3	J Garland (TPE); C-h Tseng (TPE)	1	0
Y Naito (JPN); N Tajima (JPN)	6	6

Semifinals
1	C Burel (FRA); H Gaston (FRA)	1	5
Y Naito (JPN); N Tajima (JPN)	6	7

=== Bottom half ===
First round
7	Xin Wang (CHN); T Mu (CHN)	6	7
SȘ Cadar (ROU); FC Jianu (ROU)	1	5
L Sun (SUI); D Wenger (SUI)	6	7
V Dema (UKR); A Andreev (BUL)	3	6^{3}
E Molinaro (LUX); J de Jong (NED)	6	7
M Bilokin (UKR); Y Erel (TUR)	1	6^{3}
L Ma (USA); D Baird (USA)	5	2
4	E Cocciaretto (ITA); L Musetti (ITA)	7	6
8	N Sato (JPN); G Soares Klier Júnior (BRA)	6	6
G Drummy (IRL); D N'tcha (BEN)	1	1
O Selekhmeteva (RUS); C López Montagud (ESP)	7	4	[11]
D Vismane (LAT); D Svrčina (CZE)	5	6	[9]
Xiy Wang (CHN); D Tashbulatov (KAZ)	7	6
D Parry (FRA); C Tabur (FRA)	5	2
E-s Liang (TPE); R Ho (TPE)	7	3	[8]
2	C Osorio (COL); N Mejía (COL)	5	6	[10]

Second round
7	Xin Wang (CHN); T Mu (CHN)	4	6	[6]
L Sun (SUI); D Wenger (SUI)	6	3	[10]
E Molinaro (LUX); J de Jong (NED)	4	6	[12]
4	E Cocciaretto (ITA); L Musetti (ITA)	6	2	[10]
8	N Sato (JPN); G Soares Klier Júnior (BRA)	4	7	[6]
O Selekhmeteva (RUS); C López Montagud (ESP)	6	6^{8}	[10]
Xiy Wang (CHN); D Tashbulatov (KAZ)	6	4	[8]
2	C Osorio (COL); N Mejía (COL)	4	6	[10]

Quarterfinals
L Sun (SUI); D Wenger (SUI)	6	3	[12]
E Molinaro (LUX); J de Jong (NED)	4	6	[10]
O Selekhmeteva (RUS); C López Montagud (ESP)	1	3
2	C Osorio (COL); N Mejía (COL)	6	6

Semifinals
L Sun (SUI); D Wenger (SUI)	3	6^{4}
2	C Osorio (COL); N Mejía (COL)	6	7^{7}
