= Tennis at the 2018 Summer Youth Olympics – Girls' singles =

Girls' singles at the III Summer Youth Olympic Games
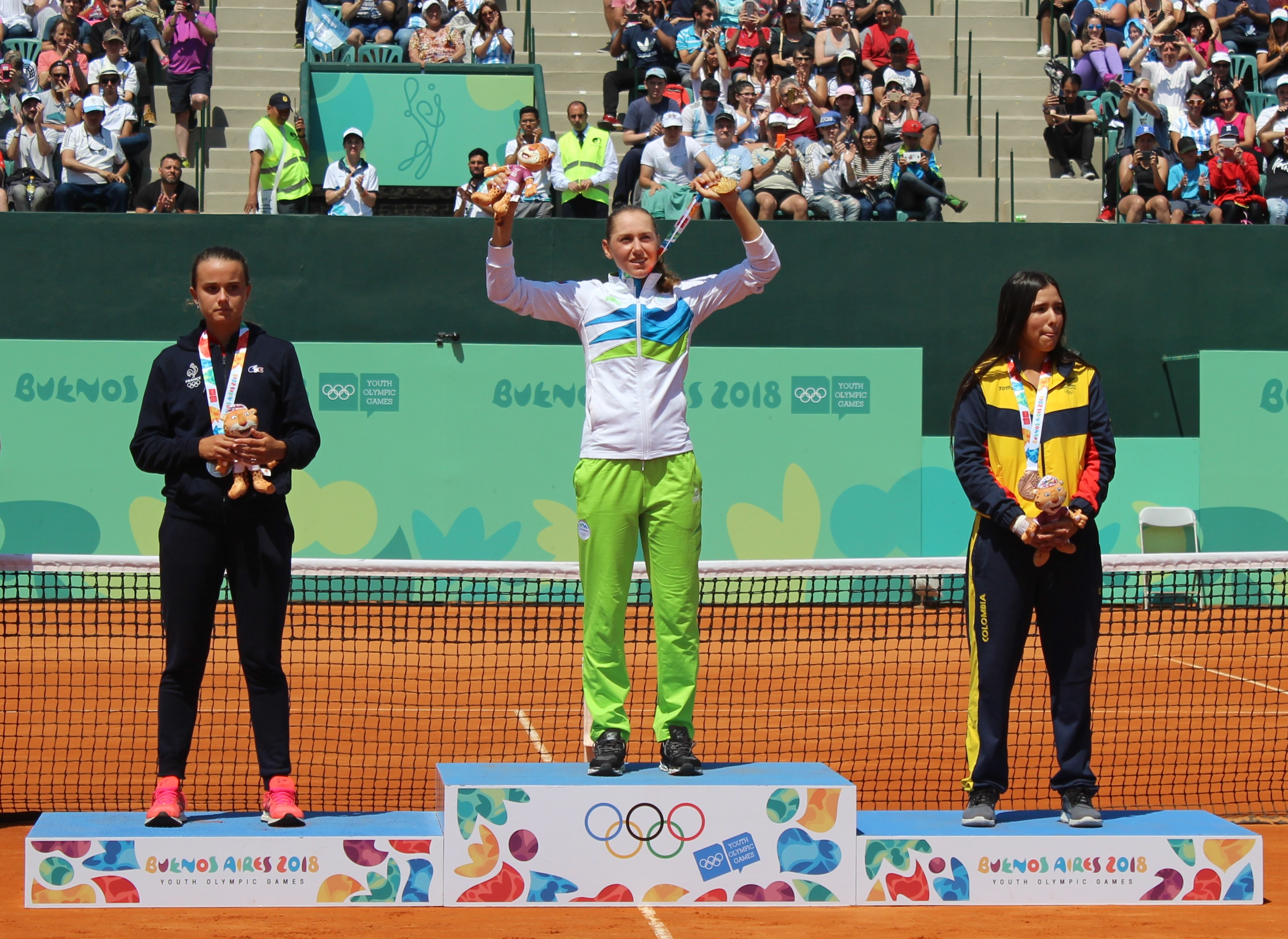
- Venue: Buenos Aires Lawn Tennis Club
- Date: 8–14 October
- Competitors: 32 from 25 nations

Medalists
1st place, gold medalist(s)		Kaja Juvan	Slovenia
2nd place, silver medalist(s)		Clara Burel	France
3rd place, bronze medalist(s)		Camila Osorio	Colombia

Girls' singles
- Tennis at the 2018 Summer Youth Olympics

Events
Singles	boys	girls
Doubles	boys	girls	mixed
- Summer Youth Olympics

These are the results for the girls' singles event at the 2018 Summer Youth Olympics.

== Seeds ==
1. Wang Xiyu (CHN) (first round)
2. Liang En-shuo (TPE) (first round)
3. Iga Świątek (POL) (quarterfinals)
4. Kaja Juvan (SLO) (Gold Medallist)
5. Wang Xinyu (CHN) (semifinals)
6. Camila Osorio (COL) (semifinals, Bronze Medallist)
7. Clara Burel (FRA) (final, Silver Medallist)
8. Alexa Noel (USA) (first round)

== Main draw ==
Key

- Q = Qualifier
- WC = Wild card
- LL = Lucky loser
- Alt = Alternate
- ITF = ITF entry
- PR = Protected ranking
- SR = Special ranking
- SE = Special exempt
- JE = Junior exempt
- JR = Junior Accelerator Programme entrant
- CO = College Accelerator Programme entrant
- NG = Next Gen Accelerator Program entrant
- w/o = Walkover
- r = Retired
- d = Defaulted

=== Finals ===
Semifinals
6	Camila Osorio (COL)	4	5
7	Clara Burel (FRA)	6	7
4	Kaja Juvan (SLO)	6	7
5	Wang Xinyu (CHN)	0	5

Gold medal match
7	Clara Burel (FRA)	5	4
4	Kaja Juvan (SLO)	7	6
Bronze medal match
6	Camila Osorio (COL)	7	6
5	Wang Xinyu (CHN)	6^{4}	0

=== Top half ===
First round
1	Xiy Wang (CHN)	6^{3}	5
Y Naito (JPN)	7	7
L Ma (USA)	6	2	1
K Rakhimova (RUS)	4	6	6
E Cocciaretto (ITA)	6	6
M Bilokin (UKR)	2	4
ML Carlé (ARG)	6^{4}	5
6	C Osorio (COL)	7^{7}	7
3	I Świątek (POL)	6	6
E Molinaro (LUX)	1	4
T Naklo (THA)	5	1
J Garland (TPE)	7	6
S Nahimana (BDI)	6	6
MG Rivera Corado (GUA)	2	1
F Curmi (MLT)	5	4
7	C Burel (FRA)	7	6

Second round
Y Naito (JPN)	7	3	6
K Rakhimova (RUS)	6^{4}	6	4
E Cocciaretto (ITA)	6	6^{2}	5
6	C Osorio (COL)	1	7	7
3	I Świątek (POL)	4	6	6
J Garland (TPE)	6	3	1
S Nahimana (BDI)	4	2
7	C Burel (FRA)	6	6

Quarterfinals
Y Naito (JPN)	7^{7}	3	1
6	C Osorio (COL)	6^{5}	6	6
3	I Świątek (POL)	4	2
7	C Burel (FRA)	6	6

Semifinals
6	C Osorio (COL)	4	5
7	C Burel (FRA)	6	7

=== Bottom half ===
First round
8	A Noel (USA)	6^{4}	3
D Parry (FRA)	7^{7}	6
O Selekhmeteva (RUS)	7^{7}	3	6
L Sun (SUI)	6^{1}	6	3
N Sato (JPN)	1	4
V Dema (UKR)	6	6
SȘ Cadar (ROU)	2	5
4	K Juvan (SLO)	6	7
5	Xin Wang (CHN)	6	7
V Kanapatskaya (BLR)	3	6^{5}
A Makatsaria (GEO)	5	3
S Zünd (LIE)	7	6
G Drummy (IRL)	6	5	6
V Ivanov (NZL)	0	7	3
D Vismane (LAT)	7	6
2	E-s Liang (TPE)	5	2

Second round
D Parry (FRA)	4	2
O Selekhmeteva (RUS)	6	6
V Dema (UKR)	0	0
4	K Juvan (SLO)	6	6
5	Xin Wang (CHN)	6	6
S Zünd (LIE)	4	0
G Drummy (IRL)	2	2
D Vismane (LAT)	6	6

Quarterfinals
O Selekhmeteva (RUS)	6	5	3
4	K Juvan (SLO)	1	7	6
5	Xin Wang (CHN)	w/o
D Vismane (LAT)

Semifinals
4	K Juvan (SLO)	6	7
5	Xin Wang (CHN)	0	5
