= Switzerland at the 2018 Summer Youth Olympics =

- IOC code: SUI
- NOC: Swiss Olympic Association
- Website: http://www.swissolympic.ch/

in Buenos Aires, Argentina 6 – 18 October 2018
- Competitors: 41 in 14 sports
- Medals Ranked 71st: Gold 0 Silver 1 Bronze 2 Total 3

Summer Youth Olympics appearances
- 2010; 2014; 2018; 2026

Switzerland participated at the 2018 Summer Youth Olympics in Buenos Aires, Argentina from 6 October to 18 October 2018.

== Beach volleyball ==
Athletes	Event	Group stage				Round of 24	Round of 16	Quarterfinals	Semifinals	Final / BM	Rank
Athletes	Event	Opposition Score	Opposition Score	Opposition Score	Rank	Opposition Score	Opposition Score	Opposition Score	Opposition Score	Opposition Score	Rank
Gysin; Broch	Boys' tournament	Amieva–Zelayeta (ARG); W 2–1	N Phichakon–T Phanupong (THA); W 2–0	Manas–Sedlák (CZE); W 2–0	1	Bye	Brewster–Schwengel (USA); L 0–2	did not advance			
Baumann; Betschart	Girls' tournament	Villar–Churín (ARG); W 2–1	Newberry–Sparks (USA); L 0–2	Lauren–Tiaan (AUS); W 2–0	2	Juárez–Alvarado (GUA); W 2–0	Olimstad–Berntsen (NOR); L 0–2	did not advance			

== Cycling ==
Switzerland qualified a boys' and girls' combined team based on its ranking in the Youth Olympic Games Junior Nation Rankings. They also qualified a mixed BMX racing team based on its ranking in the Youth Olympic Games BMX Junior Nation Rankings.

- Boys' combined team - 1 team of 2 athletes
- Girls' combined team - 1 team of 2 athletes
- Mixed BMX racing team - 1 team of 2 athletes

== Diving ==
Athlete	Event	Preliminary		Final	
Athlete	Event	Points	Rank	Points	Rank
Michelle Heimberg	Girls' 3 m springboard	389.40	10	417.90	8
Michelle Heimberg (SUI); Lou Massenberg (GER)	Mixed team	—N/a		328.50	8

== Golf ==
Individual

Athlete	Event	Round 1		Round 2			Round 3			Total		
Athlete	Event	Score	Rank	Score	Total	Rank	Score	Total	Rank	Score	Par	Rank
Elena Moosmann	Girls' Individual	78 (+8)	18	78 (+8)	156	23	73 (+3)	229	7	229	+19	19
Nicola Gerhardsen	Boys' Individual	71 (+1)	5	69 (-1)	140	3	74 (+4)	214	15	214	+4	7

Team

Athletes	Event	Round 1 (Fourball)		Round 2 (Foursome)		Round 3 (Individual Stroke)				Total		
Athletes	Event	Score	Rank	Score	Rank	Girl	Boy	Total	Rank	Score	Par	Rank
Elena Moosmann; Nicola Gerhardsen	Mixed team	62 (−8)	3	71 (+1)	6	73	72	145 (+5)	9	278	−2	4

== Gymnastics ==
=== Trampoline ===
Switzerland qualified one gymnast based on its performance at the 2018 European Junior Championship.

- Girls' trampoline - 1 quota

Athlete	Event	Qualification				Final	
Athlete	Event	Routine 1	Routine 2	Total	Rank	Score	Rank
Emily Mussmann	Girls	42.585	51.050	93.635	3	48.855	7

=== Multidiscipline ===
Team	Athlete	Acrobatic	Artistic	Rhythmic	Trampoline	Total points	Rank
Team Kohei Uchimura (Blue)	Daryna Plokhotniuk (UKR); Oleksandr Madei (UKR)	10	—N/a			407	8
Team Kohei Uchimura (Blue)	Abdulaziz Mirvaliev (UZB)	—N/a	115	—N/a		407	8
Team Kohei Uchimura (Blue)	Michael Torres (PUR)	—N/a	117	—N/a		407	8
Team Kohei Uchimura (Blue)	Ondřej Kalný (CZE)	—N/a	–	—N/a		407	8
Team Kohei Uchimura (Blue)	Amelie Morgan (GBR)	—N/a	20	—N/a		407	8
Team Kohei Uchimura (Blue)	Tang Xijing (CHN)	—N/a	9	—N/a		407	8
Team Kohei Uchimura (Blue)	Csenge Bácskay (HUN)	—N/a	5	—N/a		407	8
Team Kohei Uchimura (Blue)	Josephine Juul Møller (NOR)	—N/a		34	—N/a	407	8
Team Kohei Uchimura (Blue)	Denisa Stoian (ROU)	—N/a		47	—N/a	407	8
Team Kohei Uchimura (Blue)	Anna Kamenshchikova (BLR)	—N/a		22	—N/a	407	8
Team Kohei Uchimura (Blue)	Noureddine-Younes Belkhir (ALG)	—N/a			21	407	8
Team Kohei Uchimura (Blue)	Emily Mussmann (SUI)	—N/a			7	407	8

== Modern pentathlon ==
Switzerland qualified one athlete based on its performance at the 2018 Youth A World Championship.

- Girls' Individual - Anna Jurt

== Rowing ==
Switzerland qualified one boat based on its performance at the 2017 World Junior Rowing Championships. Later, they qualified one girls' boat based on its performance at the 2018 European Rowing Junior Championships.

- Boys' single sculls - 1 boat
- Girls' single sculls - 1 boat

== Sailing ==
Switzerland qualified one boat based on its performance at the 2018 World Championship.

- Mixed Nacra 15 - 1 boat

Athlete	Event	Race													Net points	Final rank
Athlete	Event	1	2	3	4	5	6	7	8	9	10	11	12	M*	Net points	Final rank
Arnaud Grange; Marie Van der Klink	Nacra 15	8	(15)	10	8	12	(15)	8	3	4	6	11	8	2	95.0	10

== Shooting ==
Switzerland qualified one sport shooter based on its performance at the 2018 European Championships.

- Boys' 10m Air Pistol - 1 quota

Individual

Athlete	Event	Qualification		Final	
Athlete	Event	Points	Rank	Points	Rank
Jason Solari	Boys' 10 m air pistol	570-13	4	215.6	3rd place, bronze medalist(s)

Team

Athletes	Event	Qualification		Round of 16	Quarterfinals	Semifinals	Final / BM	Rank
Athletes	Event	Points	Rank	Opposition Result	Opposition Result	Opposition Result	Opposition Result	Rank
Daria-Olimpia Haristiade (ROU); Jason Solari (SUI)	Mixed 10 metre air pistol	744-16	9	Campostrini (ITA); Zorge (LAT); L 6–10	did not advance			

== Tennis ==
Singles

Athlete	Event	Round of 32	Round of 16	Quarterfinals	Semifinals	Final / BM	
Athlete	Event	Opposition Score	Opposition Score	Opposition Score	Opposition Score	Opposition Score	Rank
Damien Wenger	Boys' singles	Álvarez Varona (ESP); L (3–6, 3–6)	did not advance				17
Lulu Sun	Girls' singles	Selekhmeteva (RUS); L (6^{1}-7^{7}, 6–3, 3–6)	did not advance				17

Doubles

Athletes	Event	Round of 32	Round of 16	Quarterfinals	Semifinals	Final / BM	
Athletes	Event	Opposition Score	Opposition Score	Opposition Score	Opposition Score	Opposition Score	Rank
Damien Wenger; Jesper de Jong (NED)	Boys' doubles	—N/a	Álvarez Varona (ESP) / López Montagud (ESP); W (6^{7}-7, 6–2, [10-8])	Štyler (CZE) / Svrčina (CZE); L (6–2, 4–6, [5-10])	did not advance		5
Lulu Sun; Selma Ștefania Cadar (ROU)	Girls' doubles	—N/a	Ma (USA) / Noel (USA); W (6–1, 6–4)	Wang Xin (CHN) / Wang Xiy (CHN); L (1–6, 6–4, [3-10])	did not advance		5
Lulu Sun; Damien Wenger	Mixed doubles	Dema (UKR) / Andreev (BUL); W (6–3, 7-6^{3})	Wang Xin (CHN) / Mu (CHN); W (6–4, 3–6, [10-6])	Molinaro (LUX) / de Jong (NED); W (6–4, 3–6, [12-10])	Osorio (COL) / Mejía (COL); L (3–6, 6^{4}-7^{7})	Burel (FRA) / Gaston (FRA); L (4–6, 7–5, [4-10])	4

== Triathlon ==
Switzerland qualified two athletes based on its performance at the 2018 European Youth Olympic Games Qualifier.

Individual

Athlete	Event	Swim (750m)	Trans 1	Bike (20 km)	Trans 2	Run (5 km)	Total Time	Rank
Loic Triponez	Boys	9:45	0:31	27:25	0:30	18:08	56:19	14
Anja Weber	Girls	9:52	0:43	29:36	0:30	18:55	59:36	3rd place, bronze medalist(s)

Relay

Athlete	Event	Total Times per Athlete (Swim 250m, Bike 6.6 km, Run 1.8 km)	Total Group Time	Rank
Europe 1 Sif Bendix Madsen (DEN); Alessio Crociani (ITA); Anja Weber (SUI); Alexandre Montez (POR)	Mixed Relay	21:42 (1); 20:55 (3); 22:40 (1); 20:55 (1)	1:26:12	1st place, gold medalist(s)
Europe 5 Chiara Lobba (ITA); Loic Triponez (SUI); Alevtina Stetsenko (RUS); Itamar Shevach Levanon (ISR)	Mixed Relay	24:00 (14); 21:54 (10); 24:26 (8); 21:28 (4)	1:31:48	8
