= France at the 2018 Summer Youth Olympics =

- IOC code: FRA
- NOC: French National Olympic and Sports Committee
- Website: https://www.franceolympique.com/

in Buenos Aires, Argentina 6 – 18 October 2018
- Competitors: 99 in 25 sports
- Medals Ranked 9th: Gold 5 Silver 15 Bronze 7 Total 27

Summer Youth Olympics appearances
- 2010; 2014; 2018; 2026

France participated at the 2018 Summer Youth Olympics in Buenos Aires, Argentina from 6 October to 18 October 2018.

== Archery ==
France qualified one archer based on its performance at the 2017 World Archery Youth Championships.

Individual

Athlete	Event	Ranking round		Round of 32	Round of 16	Quarterfinals	Semifinals	Final / BM	Rank
Athlete	Event	Score	Seed	Opposition Score	Opposition Score	Opposition Score	Opposition Score	Opposition Score	Rank
Kyla Touraine-Helias	Girls' Individual	644	12	Giannasio (ARG); W 7–3	Chang (TPE); L 2–6	did not advance			9

Team

Athletes	Event	Ranking round		Round of 32	Round of 16	Quarterfinals	Semifinals	Final / BM	Rank
Athletes	Event	Score	Seed	Opposition Score	Opposition Score	Opposition Score	Opposition Score	Opposition Score	Rank
Kyla Touraine-Helias (FRA); José Manuel Solera (ESP)	Mixed team	1301	11	Rong-jia (TPE); Lee (CAN); W 6–0	Sliachticas Caetano (BRA); Ross (BEL); W 6–2	Kharitonova (RUS); Rezowan (BAN); W 5–1	Reddig (NAM); Cowles (USA); W 5–3	Giannasio (ARG); Soithong (THA); W 5–1	1st place, gold medalist(s)

== Badminton ==
France qualified two players based on the Badminton Junior World Rankings.

Singles

Athlete	Event	Group stage				Quarterfinal	Semifinal	Final / BM	Rank
Athlete	Event	Opposition Score	Opposition Score	Opposition Score	Rank	Opposition Score	Opposition Score	Opposition Score	Rank
Arnaud Merklé	Boys' Singles	Barth (NOR); W 2–0	Resch (GER); W 2–1	Yang (CAN); W 2–1	1Q	Vitidsarn (THA); W 2–0	Li (CHN); L 0–2	Naraoka (JPN); L 1–2	4
Léonice Huet	Girls' Singles	Mizui (JPN); L 0–2	Wang (CHN); L 0–2	Bouksani (ALG); W 2–0	3	did not advance			9

Team

Athlete	Event	Group stage				Quarterfinal	Semifinal	Final / BM	Rank
Athlete	Event	Opposition Score	Opposition Score	Opposition Score	Rank	Opposition Score	Opposition Score	Opposition Score	Rank
Team Delta; Arnaud Merklé (FRA); Mateo Delmastro (ARG); Dmitriy Panarin (KAZ); Balázs Pápai (HUN); Elena Andreu (ESP); Pattarasuda Chaiwan (THA); Madouc Linders (NED); Petra Polanc (SLO)	Mixed Teams	Zeta (MIX); W (110–95)	Alpha (MIX); W (110–99)	Epsilon (MIX); L (108–110)	1Q	Theta (MIX); L (93–110)	did not advance		5
Team Omega; Léonice Huet (FRA); Markus Barth (NOR); Oscar Guo (NZL); Chang Ho Kim (FIJ); Kunlavut Vitidsarn (THA); Huang Yin-hsuan (TPE); Anastasiya Prozorova (UKR); Vũ Thị Anh Thư (VIE)	Mixed Teams	Gamma (MIX); W (110–99)	Theta (MIX); W (110–100)	Sigma (MIX); W (110–98)	1Q	Epsilon (MIX); W (110–102)	Zeta (MIX); W (110–109)	Alpha (MIX); L (106–110)	2nd place, silver medalist(s)

== Basketball ==
France qualified a girls' team based on the U18 3x3 National Federation Ranking.

- Girls' tournament – 1 team of 4 athletes

Event	Group stage					Quarterfinal	Semifinal	Final / BM	
Event	Opposition Score	Opposition Score	Opposition Score	Opposition Score	Rank	Opposition Score	Opposition Score	Opposition Score	Rank
Girls' tournament	Indonesia; W 22–12	Argentina; L 13–18	Mexico; W 15–8	Andorra; W 21–7	2	Hungary; W 13–12	Australia; W 20–19	United States; L 4–18	2nd place, silver medalist(s)

Shoot-out contest

Athlete	Event	Qualification		Final					
Athlete	Event	Points	Rank	Round 1	Round 2	Round 3	Round 4	Total	Rank
Mathilde Peyregne	Shoot-out contest	6	3	1	2	2	4	9	1st place, gold medalist(s)
Olivia Yale	Shoot-out contest	3	23	did not advance					

== Boxing ==
Girls

Athlete	Event	Preliminaries	Semifinals	Final / RM	Rank
Athlete	Event	Opposition Result	Opposition Result	Opposition Result	Rank
Tallya Brillaux	-75 kg	Selaj (ALB); W 5–0	Chaib (ALG); W 5–0	Shamonova (RUS); L 2–3	2nd place, silver medalist(s)

== Canoeing ==
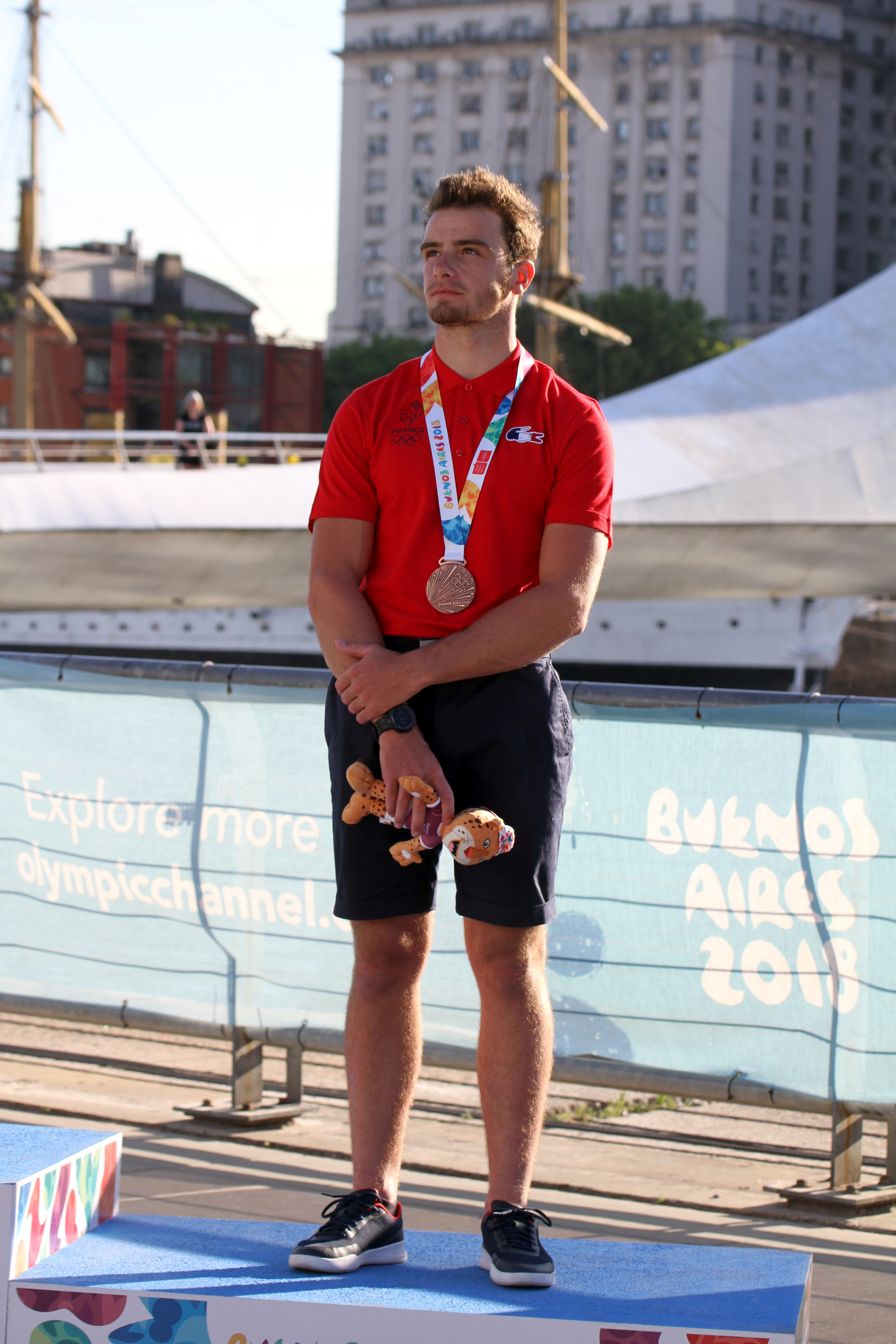
Tom Bouchardon at victory ceremony

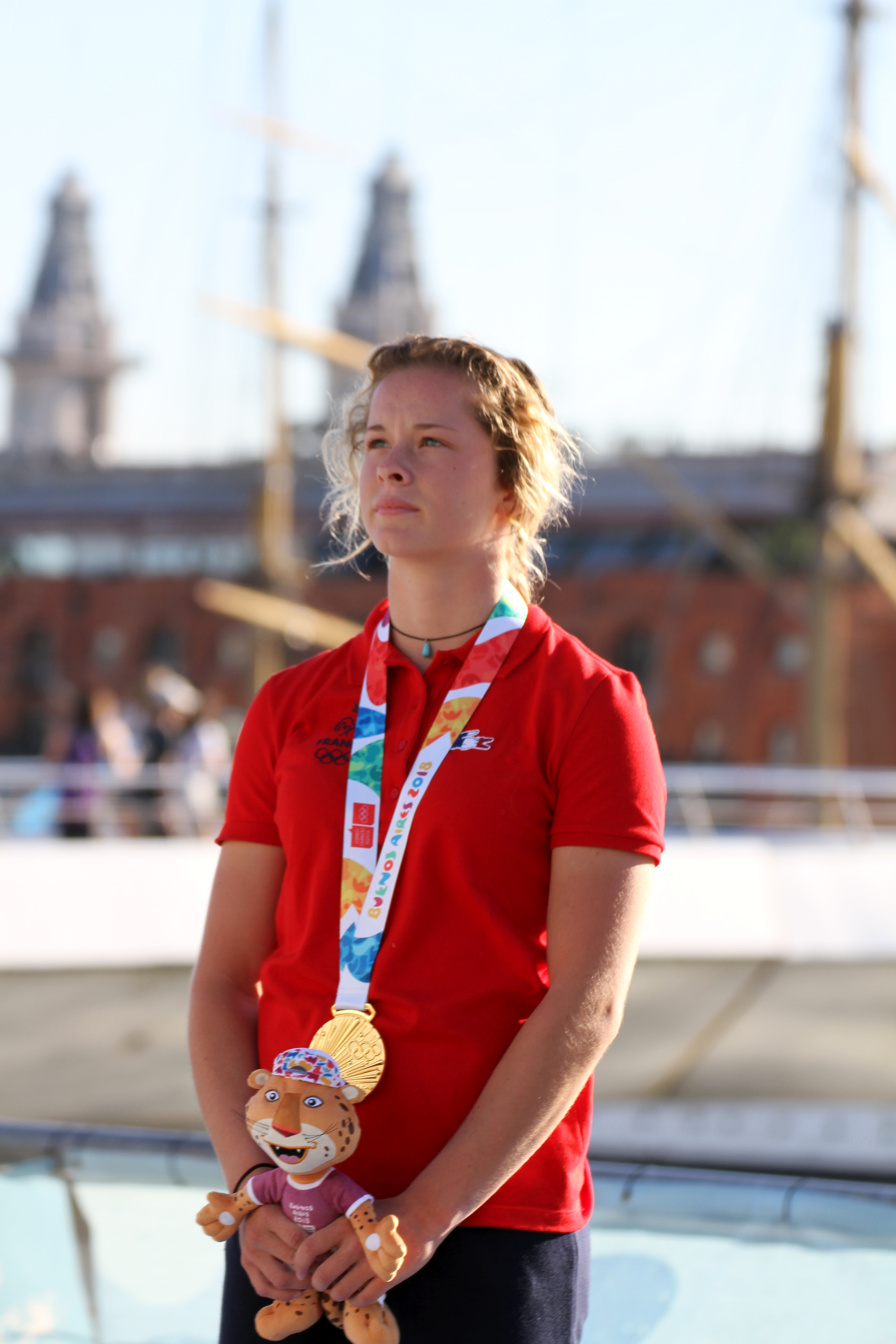
Doriane Delassus at victory ceremony

France qualified three boats based on its performance at the 2018 World Qualification Event.

- Boys' K1 – 1 boat
- Girls' C1 – 1 boat
- Girls' K1 – 1 boat

Athlete	Event	Qualification		Repechage		Last 16	Quarterfinals	Semifinals	Final / BM	Rank
Athlete	Event	Time	Rank	Time	Rank	Opposition Result	Opposition Result	Opposition Result	Opposition Result	Rank
Tom Bouchardon	Boys' K1 sprint	1:50.83	10	1:50.46	6	—N/a	did not advance			
Tom Bouchardon	Boys' K1 slalom	1:14.57	4	Bye		—N/a	Pilarz (POL); W 1:13.62	Tominc (SLO); L 1:15.70	Snook (NZL); W 1:11.09	3rd place, bronze medalist(s)
Doriane Delassus	Girls' C1 sprint	4:08.59	17	4:05.79	7	Marusava (BLR); L 4:00.38	did not advance			
Doriane Delassus	Girls' C1 slalom	1:30.16	4	Bye		Otero (ESP); W 1:28.49	Bello (NGR); W 1:27.25	Asadbeki (IRI); W 1:27.54	Lewandowski (GER); W 1:26.08	1st place, gold medalist(s)
Doriane Delassus	Girls' K1 sprint	2:13.68	17	2:11.30	7	Zironi (ITA); L 2:11.30	did not advance			
Doriane Delassus	Girls' K1 slalom	1:21.44	2	Bye		Charayron (FRA); W 1:21.03	Phuangmaiming (THA); W 1:20.29	Lewandowski (GER); W 1:19.90	Luknárová (SVK); L 1:20.00	2nd place, silver medalist(s)
Romane Charayron	Girls' K1 sprint	1:56.42	6	Bye		Valenzuela (CHI); W 1:58.25	Rendessy (HUN); L 1:56.86	did not advance		
Romane Charayron	Girls' K1 slalom	1:24.46	9	1:26.03	2	Delassus (FRA); L 1:25.00	did not advance			

== Dancesport ==
France qualified two dancers based on its performance at the 2018 World Youth Breaking Championship.

- B-Boys – Martin
- B-Girls – Senorita Carlota

== Diving ==
Athlete	Event	Preliminary		Final	
Athlete	Event	Points	Rank	Points	Rank
Jules Bouyer	Boys' 3 m springboard	483.40	10	487.80	11

== Fencing ==
France qualified two athletes based on its performance at the 2018 Cadet World Championship.

- Boys' Foil – Armand Spichiger
- Boys' Sabre – Samuel Jarry

== Golf ==
Individual

Athlete	Event	Round 1		Round 2			Round 3			Total		
Athlete	Event	Score	Rank	Score	Total	Rank	Score	Total	Rank	Score	Par	Rank
Mathilde Claisse	Girls' Individual	78 (+8)	18	78 (+8)	156	23	75 (+5)	231	16	231	+21	20
Thomas Boulanger	Boys' Individual	74 (+4)	16	77 (+7)	151	23	73 (+3)	224	12	224	+14	18

Team

Athletes	Event	Round 1 (Fourball)		Round 2 (Foursome)		Round 3 (Individual Stroke)				Total		
Athletes	Event	Score	Rank	Score	Rank	Girl	Boy	Total	Rank	Score	Par	Rank
Mathilde Claisse; Thomas Boulanger	Mixed team	66 (−4)	16	79 (+9)	25	80	78	158 (+18)	29	303	+23	29

== Gymnastics ==
=== Artistic ===
France qualified two gymnasts based on its performance at the 2018 European Junior Championship.

- Boys' artistic individual all-around – 1 quota
- Girls' artistic individual all-around – 1 quota

=== Rhythmic ===
France qualified one rhythmic gymnast based on its performance at the European qualification event.

- Girls' rhythmic individual all-around – 1 quota

== Judo ==
Individual

Athlete	Event	Round of 16	Quarterfinals	Semifinals	Rep 1	Rep 2	Rep 3	Final / BM	
Athlete	Event	Opposition Result	Opposition Result	Opposition Result	Opposition Result	Opposition Result	Opposition Result	Opposition Result	Rank
Romain Valadier-Picard	Boys' 55 kg	Adrián Medero (PUR); W 10-00	Artsiom Kolasau (BLR); L 00-10	did not advance	Bye	Euclides Lopes (GBS); W 10-00s1	Aleddine Ben Chalbi (TUN); W 01s2-00s2	Oleh Veredyba (UKR); L 00s3-10	4

Team

Athletes	Event	Round of 16	Quarterfinals	Semifinals	Final	Rank
Athletes	Event	Opposition Result	Opposition Result	Opposition Result	Opposition Result	Rank
Team Nanjing; Hasret Bozkurt (TUR); Joaquín Burgos (ARG); Nilufar Ermaganbetova (UZB); Rihari Iki (NZL); Alaa Mousaad Mohamed (EGY); Eva Pérez Soler (ESP); Vugar Talibov (AZE); Romain Valadier-Picard (FRA)	Mixed Team	—N/a	Team Beijing (MIX); L 3–4	did not advance		

== Karate ==
Athlete	Event	Elimination round				Semifinals	Final	
Athlete	Event	Opposition Score	Opposition Score	Opposition Score	Rank	Opposition Score	Opposition Score	Rank
Oukhattou	Girls' 59 kg	Charlotte Hope (GBR); W 4–0	Anna Chernysheva (RUS); L 0–8	Heydariozomcheloei (IRI); L 0–1	3	did not advance		

== Modern pentathlon ==
France qualified two athletes based on its performance at the 2018 Youth A World Championship.

- Boys' Individual – Hugo Fleurot
- Girls' Individual – Emma Riff

== Roller speed skating ==
France qualified two roller skaters based on its performance at the 2018 Roller Speed Skating World Championship.

- Boys' combined speed event – Ewen Foussadier
- Girls' combined speed event – Honorine Barrault

== Rowing ==
France qualified one boat based on its performance at the 2017 World Junior Rowing Championships.

- Girls' single sculls – Lucine AHYI

== Rugby sevens ==
=== Boys' tournament ===
Roster

- Dorian Bellot
- Erwan Dridi
- Martin Dulon
- Baptiste Germain
- Sasha Gue
- Théo Louvet
- Yoram Moefana
- Yann Peysson
- Calum Randle
- Cheikh Tiberghien
- Joachim Trouabal
- Tani Vili

Group Stage

Pos	Team	Pld	W	D	L	PF	PA	PD	Pts
1	Argentina	5	5	0	0	180	38	+142	15
2	France	5	4	0	1	111	65	+46	13
3	Japan	5	2	1	2	74	103	−29	10
4	South Africa	5	2	0	3	79	84	−5	9
5	United States	5	0	2	3	67	120	−53	7
6	Samoa	5	0	1	4	48	149	−101	6

Source: Buenos Aires 2018
Rules for classification: 1) Points; 2) Head-to-head result; 3) Point difference; 4) Points scored.

13 October 2018
13:40

United States	0–38	France
	Report	Try: Vili 1'm Trouabal 3'c Germain 5'c Louvet (2) 6'c, 8'c Dridi 12'm Con: Germain (3/4) 4', 5', 7'; Bellot (1/2) 8'

Club Atlético San Isidro, Buenos Aires
Referee: Damián Schneider (Argentina)

13 October 2018
16:20

South Africa	12–17	France
Try: Manyike 6'c Zwelendaba 11'm Con: Manyike (1/1) 6'; Rose (0/1)	Report	Try: Trouabal (2) 1'm, 7'c Dridi 3'm Con: Germain (1/3) 7'

Club Atlético San Isidro, Buenos Aires
Referee: Paulo Duarte (Portugal)

14 October 2018
9:40

Argentina	29–12	France
Try: Vanni 0'c Moneta (2) 4'm, 13'm Costa 5'c Mendy 14'm Con: Roger (2/3) 1', 6'; Elicagaray (0/2)	Report	Try: Randle 7'c Trouabal 10'm Con: Germain (1/1) 7'; Tiberghein (0/1)

Club Atlético San Isidro, Buenos Aires
Referee: Paulo Duarte (Portugal)

14 October 2018
13:10

France	15–10	Samoa
Try: Peysson 1'm Trouabal 8'm Dulon 14'm Con: Germain (0/1); Tiberghien (0/1); Bellot (0/1)	Report	Try: Tuitama 2'm Fuiono 7'm Con: Sepulona (0/2)

Club Atlético San Isidro, Buenos Aires
Referee: Damián Schneider (Argentina)

15 October 2018
11:55

France	29–14	Japan
Try: Dridi 1'c Dulon 4'm Randle 6'c Trouabal 11'm Tani 13'm Con: Bellot (1/2) 2'; Tiberghien (1/2) 7'; Germain (0/1)	Report	Try: Konishi 3'c Fujii 9'c Con: Konishi (1/1) 4'; Yamada (1/1) 9'

Club Atlético San Isidro, Buenos Aires
Referee: Paulo Duarte (Portugal)

Gold Medal Match

15 October 2018
16:00

Argentina	24–14	France
Try: Mendy 0'm Cinti Luna 2'c Roger 4'c Costa 12'm Con: Roger (2/4) 2', 5'	Report	Try: Trouabal (2) 9'c, 10'c Con: Germain (1/1) 9', 10'

Club Atlético San Isidro, Buenos Aires
Referee: Paulo Duarte (Portugal)

=== Girls' tournament ===
Roster

- Axelle Berthoumieu
- Alycia Christiaens
- Mélanie Daumalle
- Charlotte Escudero
- Lucy Hapulat
- Salomé Maran
- Alice Muller
- Lou Noel
- Aurélie Plantefeve
- Méline Puech
- Celia Roue
- Chloé Sanz

Group Stage

Pos	Team	Pld	W	D	L	PF	PA	PD	Pts
1	New Zealand	5	5	0	0	169	27	+142	15
2	France	5	4	0	1	178	45	+133	13
3	Canada	5	3	0	2	125	85	+40	11
4	Colombia	5	2	0	3	66	119	−53	9
5	Kazakhstan	5	1	0	4	44	142	−98	7
6	Tunisia	5	0	0	5	19	183	−164	5

Source: Buenos Aires 2018
Rules for classification: 1) Points; 2) Head-to-head result; 3) Point difference; 4) Points scored.

13 October 2018
12:25

France	47–0	Colombia
Try: Noel 1'm Christiaens (2) 5'c, 10'c Daumalle (2) 7'c, 8'c Hapulat 11'c Roue 14'c Con: Maran (4/5) 6', 10', 12', 14'; Christiaens (2/2) 7', 8'	Report

Club Atlético San Isidro, Buenos Aires
Referee: Ashleigh Murray (South Africa)

13 October 2018
15:30

France	45–0	Kazakhstan
Try: Christiaens (3) 3'c, 4'm, 10'c Sanz 6'c Daumalle 7'c Hapulat 12'm Muller 14'c Con: Plantefeve (2/3) 3', 7'; Christiaens (1/1) 6'; Maran (2/3) 11', 14'	Report

Club Atlético San Isidro, Buenos Aires
Referee: Lauren Jenner (New Zealand)

14 October 2018
12:00

New Zealand	26–12	France
Try: Watene 4'c Tairakena (2) 6'm, 8'c Pouri-Lane 11'c Con: Pouri-Lane (3/4) 4', 9', 11'	Report	Try: Berthoumieu 2'm Muller 13'c Con: Christiaens (1/1) 13'; Maran (0/1)

Club Atlético San Isidro, Buenos Aires
Referee: Ashleigh Murray (South Africa)

14 October 2018
15:30

France	41–0	Tunisia
Try: Noel (3) 2'm, 5'c, 13'm Muller 7'c Plantefeve 10'm Hapulat (2) 12'm, 14'c Con: Maran (3/7) 5', 7', 14'	Report

Club Atlético San Isidro, Buenos Aires
Referee: Lauren Jenner (New Zealand)

15 October 2018
10:15

France	33–19	Canada
Try: Escudero 3'c Hapulat (3) 7'm, 9'c, 13'c Christiaens 11'c Con: Christiaens (3/4) 3', 9', 11'; Maran (1/1) 14'	Report	Try: Aikens (2) 0'm, 7'c Con: Black (1/2) 7'

Club Atlético San Isidro, Buenos Aires
Referee: Maddy Putz (Australia)

Gold Medal Match

15 October 2018
15:35

(gold) New Zealand	15–12	France (silver)
Try: Tairakena 0'm Hohaia 4'm Mahina 11'm Con: Pouri-Lane (0/3)	Report	Try: Christiaens 6'c Hapulat 9'm Con: Christiaens (1/2) 7'

Club Atlético San Isidro, Buenos Aires
Referee: Ashleigh Murray (South Africa)

== Sailing ==
France qualified two boats based on its performance at the 2017 World Techno 293+ Championships. France later qualified two boats based on its performance at the 2018 IKA Twin Tip Racing Youth World Championship. A Nacra 15 boat was qualified based on their performance at the 2018 Nacra 15 World Championships.

- Boys' Techno 293+ – 1 boat
- Boys' IKA Twin Tip Racing – 1 boat
- Girls' Techno 293+ – 1 boat
- Girls' IKA Twin Tip Racing – 1 boat
- Mixed Nacra 15 – 1 boat

== Shooting ==
France qualified one sport shooter based on its performance at the 2017 European Championships.

- Girls' 10m Air Pistol – 1 quota

Individual

Athlete	Event	Qualification		Final	
Athlete	Event	Points	Rank	Points	Rank
Kateline Nicolas	Girls' 10 metre air pistol	557-11	12	did not advance	

Team

Athletes	Event	Qualification		Round of 16	Quarterfinals	Semifinals	Final / BM	Rank
Athletes	Event	Points	Rank	Opposition Result	Opposition Result	Opposition Result	Opposition Result	Rank
Kateline Nicolas (FRA); James Andrew John Miller (GBR)	Mixed 10 metre air pistol	739-12	14	Seeger (GER); Kirov (BUL); L 5–10	did not advance			

== Sport climbing ==
France qualified two sport climbers based on its performance at the 2017 World Youth Sport Climbing Championships.

- Boys' combined – 2 quotas (Sam Avezou, Nathan Martin)

== Table tennis ==
France qualified one table tennis player based on its performance at the European Continental Qualifier. France later qualified a male player based on its performance at the Road to Buenos Aires (Europe) series.

- Boys' singles – Bastien Rembert
- Girls' singles – Lucie Gauthier

== Tennis ==
Singles

Athlete	Event	Round of 32	Round of 16	Quarterfinals	Semifinals	Final / BM	
Athlete	Event	Opposition Score	Opposition Score	Opposition Score	Opposition Score	Opposition Score	Rank
Hugo Gaston	Boys' singles	Hardt (DOM); W (6-2, 6-1)	Tajima (JPN); W (6-3, 6-2)	Michalski (POL); W (6-4, 6-1)	Soares Klier Júnior (BRA); W (6-4, 6-1)	Díaz Acosta (ARG); W (6-4, 7-5)	1st place, gold medalist(s)
Clément Tabur	Boys' singles	Svrčina (CZE); W (7-5, 3-6, 6–2)	Jianu (ROU); L (7-6^{5}, 4–6, 6^{3}-7)	did not advance			9
Clara Burel	Girls' singles	Curmi (MLT); W (7-5, 6-4)	Nahimana (BDI); W (6-4, 6-2)	Świątek (POL); W (6-4, 6-2)	Osorio (COL); W (6-4, 7-5)	Juvan (SLO); L (5-7, 4-6)	2nd place, silver medalist(s)
Diane Parry	Girls' singles	Noel (USA); W (7^{7}-6^{4}, 6-3)	Selekhmeteva (RUS); L (4-6, 2-6)	did not advance			9

Doubles

Athletes	Event	Round of 32	Round of 16	Quarterfinals	Semifinals	Final / BM	
Athletes	Event	Opposition Score	Opposition Score	Opposition Score	Opposition Score	Opposition Score	Rank
Hugo Gaston; Clément Tabur	Boys' doubles	—N/a	Bovy (BEL) / Miladinović (SRB); W (6-0, 6-4)	Hardt (DOM) / Sydow (ARU); W (6-2, 6-2)	Andreev (BUL) / Hijikata (AUS); L (1-6, 4-6)	Štyler (CZE) / Svrčina (CZE); W (6^{4}-7, 7-5, [10-8])	3rd place, bronze medalist(s)
Clara Burel; Diane Parry	Girls' doubles	—N/a	Curmi (MLT) / Molinaro (LUX); W (6-4, 3-6, [10-5])	Juvan (SLO) / Świątek (POL); L (0-6, 4-6)	did not advance		5
Clara Burel; Hugo Gaston	Mixed doubles	Rakhimova (RUS) / Štyler (CZE); W (4-6, 6-4, [10-8])	Carlé (ARG) / Báez (ARG); W (7-5, 4-6, [10-8])	Juvan (SLO) / Miladinović (SRB); W (6-2, 5-7, [11-9])	Naito (JPN) / Tajima (JPN); L (1-6, 5-7)	Sun (SUI) / Wenger (SUI); W (6-4, 5-7, [10-4])	3rd place, bronze medalist(s)
Diane Parry; Clément Tabur	Mixed doubles	Wang Xiyu (CHN) / Tashbulatov (KAZ); L (5-7, 2-6)	did not advance				17

== Triathlon ==
France qualified two athletes based on its performance at the 2018 European Youth Olympic Games Qualifier.

Individual

Athlete	Event	Swim (750m)	Trans 1	Bike (20 km)	Trans 2	Run (5 km)	Total Time	Rank
Baptiste Passemard	Boys	9:40	0:27	27:32	0:26	16:21	54:26	5
Emilie Noyer	Girls	10:52	0:44	31:04	0:32	17:25	1:00:37	7

Relay

Athlete	Event	Total Times per Athlete (Swim 250m, Bike 6.6 km, Run 1.8 km)	Total Group Time	Rank
Europe 2 Eva Daniels (LUX); Andreas Carlsson (SWE); Barbara de Koning (NED); Baptiste Passemard (FRA)	Mixed Relay	22:24 (4) - - -	DNF	
Europe 3 Marie Horn (GER); Henry Graf (GER); Emilie Noyer (FRA); Igor Bellido Mikhailova (ESP)	Mixed Relay	23:39 (12); 20:42 (2); 23:13 (3); 21:25 (3)	1:28:59	3rd place, bronze medalist(s)

== Wrestling ==
Key:
- VFA – Victory by Fall
- VPO – Without any points scored by the opponent

Athlete	Event	Group stage					Final / RM	Rank
Athlete	Event	Opposition Score	Opposition Score	Opposition Score	Opposition Score	Rank	Opposition Score	Rank
Justine Vigouroux	Girls' freestyle −43kg	Shilson (USA); L 0 – 5 ^{VPO}	Ogunsanya (NGR); W 1 – 0 ^{VPO}	Martinez (BRA); W 11 – 2 ^{VFA}	Nazarova (AZE); L 0 – 1 ^{VPO}	3 Q	Leorda (MDA); W 4 – 0 ^{VPO}	5
