= Romania at the 2018 Summer Youth Olympics =

- IOC code: ROU
- NOC: Romanian Olympic and Sports Committee
- Website: http://www.cosr.ro/

in Buenos Aires, Argentina 6 – 18 October 2018
- Competitors: 34 in 13 sports
- Medals Ranked 29th: Gold 2 Silver 3 Bronze 3 Total 8

Summer Youth Olympics appearances
- 2010; 2014; 2018; 2026

Romania participated at the 2018 Summer Youth Olympics in Buenos Aires, Argentina from 6 October to 18 October 2018.

== Basketball ==
Romania qualified a girls' team based on the U18 3x3 National Federation Ranking.

- Girls' tournament - 1 team of 4 athletes

| Event | Group stage | | | | | Quarterfinal | Semifinal | Final / BM | |
| Event | Opposition Score | Opposition Score | Opposition Score | Opposition Score | Rank | Opposition Score | Opposition Score | Opposition Score | Rank |
|---|---|---|---|---|---|---|---|---|---|
| Girls' tournament | Germany; L 16–18 | Iran; W 18–14 | China; L 14–18 | Hungary; L 21–10 | 4 | did not advance | | | |

Shoot-out contest

| Athlete | Event | Qualification | | Final | | | | | |
| Athlete | Event | Points | Rank | Round 1 | Round 2 | Round 3 | Round 4 | Total | Rank |
|---|---|---|---|---|---|---|---|---|---|
| Maria Ferariu | Shoot-out contest | 3 | 18 | did not advance | | | | | |
| Carla Popescu | Shoot-out contest | 3 | 21 | did not advance | | | | | |

== Diving ==
| Athlete | Event | Preliminary | | Final | |
| Athlete | Event | Points | Rank | Points | Rank |
|---|---|---|---|---|---|
| Aurelian Dragomir | Boys' 3 m springboard | 386.00 | 14 | did not advance | |
| Aurelian Dragomir | Boys' 10 m platform | 443.85 | 10 | 423.75 | 11 |
| Uliana Kliueva (RUS); Aurelian Dragomir (ROU) | Mixed team | —N/a | | 310.20 | 9 |

== Fencing ==
Romania qualified two athletes based on its performance at the 2018 Cadet World Championship.

- Boys' Sabre - Andrei Pastin
- Girls' Foil - Rebeca Candescu

== Gymnastics ==
=== Artistic ===
Romania qualified one gymnast based on its performance at the 2018 European Junior Championship.

- Girls' artistic individual all-around - 1 quota

=== Rhythmic ===
Romania qualified one rhythmic gymnast based on its performance at the European qualification event.

- Girls' rhythmic individual all-around - 1 quota

== Judo ==
Individual

| Athlete | Event | Round of 16 | Quarterfinals | Semifinals | Rep 1 | Rep 2 | Rep 3 | Final / BM | |
| Athlete | Event | Opposition Result | Opposition Result | Opposition Result | Opposition Result | Opposition Result | Opposition Result | Opposition Result | Rank |
|---|---|---|---|---|---|---|---|---|---|
| Adrian Şulcă | Boys' 81 kg | Rihari Iki (NZL); W 10-0 | Rhys Allan (AUS); W 01-00 | Alex Barto (SVK); W 10-00 | did not advance | | | Martin Bezděk (CZE); W 10-00 | 1st place, gold medalist(s) |
| Giorgia Hagianu | Girls' 44 kg | Eva Pérez Soler (ESP); L 01-10 | did not advance | | Paulina Țurcan (MDA); W 01s1-00 | Mikaela Rojas (ARG); L 01s3-11s1 | did not advance | | 5 |

Team

| Athletes | Event | Round of 16 | Quarterfinals | Semifinals | Final | Rank |
| Athletes | Event | Opposition Result | Opposition Result | Opposition Result | Opposition Result | Rank |
|---|---|---|---|---|---|---|
| Team Sydney; Giorgia Hagianu (ROU); Fatime Barka Segue (CHA); Irena Khubulova (RUS); Shakhida Narmukhamedova (KGZ); Euclides Lopes (GBS); Simon Zulu (ZAM); Keagan Young (CAN); Ömer Aydın (TUR) | Mixed Team | Team Rio de Janeiro (MIX); L 3–4 | did not advance | | | 9 |
| Team Atlanta; Tiguidanke Camara (GUI); Aleksa Georgieva (BUL); Vusala Karimova (AZE); Adrián Medero (PUR); Rok Pogorevc (SLO); Fatine Rzal (MAR); Adrian Sulca (ROU); Antonio Tornal (DOM) | Mixed team | Team Barcelona (MIX); W 4–3 | Team Barcelona (MIX); L 3–4 | did not advance | | |

== Rowing ==
Romania qualified two boats based on its performance at the 2017 World Junior Rowing Championships.

- Boys' pair – 2 athletes
- Girls' pair – 2 athletes

== Shooting ==
Individual

| Athlete | Event | Qualification | | Final | |
| Athlete | Event | Points | Rank | Points | Rank |
|---|---|---|---|---|---|
| Daria-Olimpia Haristiade | Girls' 10 metre air pistol | 544-6 | 18 | did not advance | |

Team

| Athletes | Event | Qualification | | Round of 16 | Quarterfinals | Semifinals | Final / BM | Rank |
| Athletes | Event | Points | Rank | Opposition Result | Opposition Result | Opposition Result | Opposition Result | Rank |
|---|---|---|---|---|---|---|---|---|
| Daria-Olimpia Haristiade (ROU); Jason Solari (SUI) | Mixed 10 metre air pistol | 744-16 | 9 | Campostrini (ITA); Zorge (LAT); L 6–10 | did not advance | | | |

== Swimming ==
Boys

| Athlete | Event | Heat | | Semifinal | | Final | |
| Athlete | Event | Time | Rank | Time | Rank | Time | Rank |
|---|---|---|---|---|---|---|---|
| Daniel Cristian Martin | 100 metre backstroke | 54.46 | 2 | 54.08 | 2 | 53.59 | 2nd place, silver medalist(s) |
| Daniel Cristian Martin | 200 metre backstroke | 2:00.15 | 2 | —N/a | | 1:58.20 | 2nd place, silver medalist(s) |
| Daniel Cristian Martin | 100 metre butterfly | 53.33 | 5 | 52.70 | 5 | 53.00 | 7 |
| George Rațiu | 50 metre butterfly | 24.75 | 18 | did not advance | | | |
| George Rațiu | 50 metre freestyle | 23.05 | 9 | 22.85 | 7 | 22.79 | 6 |
| George Rațiu | 100 metre freestyle | 52.61 | 32 | did not advance | | | |

Girls

| Athlete | Event | Heat | | Semifinal | | Final | |
| Athlete | Event | Time | Rank | Time | Rank | Time | Rank |
|---|---|---|---|---|---|---|---|
| Maria Claudia Gadea | 200 metre individual medley | 2:20.02 | 18 | did not advance | | | |
| Maria Claudia Gadea | 100 metre breaststroke | 1:12.04 | 26 | did not advance | | | |
| Maria Claudia Gadea | 200 metre breaststroke | 2:34.61 | 21 | did not advance | | | |
| Ingrid Huszár | 50 metre breaststroke | 33.68 | 27 | did not advance | | | |
| Ingrid Huszár | 100 metre breaststroke | 1:12.36 | 30 | did not advance | | | |
| Ingrid Huszár | 200 metre breaststroke | 2:40.65 | 34 | did not advance | | | |

== Table tennis ==
Romania qualified two table tennis players based on its performance at the Road to Buenos Aires (Europe) series.

| Athlete | Event | Group stage | | | | Round of 16 | Quarterfinals | Semifinals | Final / BM | |
| Athlete | Event | Opposition Score | Opposition Score | Opposition Score | Rank | Opposition Score | Opposition Score | Opposition Score | Opposition Score | Rank |
|---|---|---|---|---|---|---|---|---|---|---|
| Cristian Pletea | Boys' singles | Youssef Abdel-Aziz (EGY); W 4–0 | Khinhang Yu (AZE); W 4–1 | Nathan Xu (NZL); W 4–0 | 1 | Matteo Mutti (ITA); W 4–1 | Tomokazu Harimoto (JPN); L 1–4 | did not advance | | 5 |
| Andreea Dragoman | Girls' singles | Pei-Ling Su (TPE); W 4–0 | Jing Ning (AZE); L 2–4 | Esther Oribamise (NGR); W 4–0 | 1 | Anna Węgrzyn (POL); W 4–1 | Amy Wang (USA); W 4–2 | Miu Hirano (JPN); L 0–4 | AG Kamath (IND); W 4–1 | 3rd place, bronze medalist(s) |
| Cristian Pletea (ROU); Andreea Dragoman (ROU) | Mixed team | Fiji; W 3–0 | United States; W 2–1 | New Zealand; W 3–0 | 1 | India; W 2–1 | Chinese Taipei; L 0–2 | did not advance | | 5 |

== Tennis ==
Singles

| Athlete | Event | Round of 32 | Round of 16 | Quarterfinals | Semifinals | Final / BM | |
| Athlete | Event | Opposition Score | Opposition Score | Opposition Score | Opposition Score | Opposition Score | Rank |
|---|---|---|---|---|---|---|---|
| Filip Cristian Jianu | Boys' singles | Musetti (ITA); W (6-4, 6-4) | Tabur (FRA); W (6^{5}-7, 6-4, 7-6^{3}) | Andreev (BUL); L (2-6, 4-6) | did not advance | | 5 |
| Selma Ștefania Cadar | Girls' singles | Juvan (SLO); L (2-6, 5-7) | did not advance | | | | 17 |

Doubles

| Athletes | Event | Round of 32 | Round of 16 | Quarterfinals | Semifinals | Final / BM | |
| Athletes | Event | Opposition Score | Opposition Score | Opposition Score | Opposition Score | Opposition Score | Rank |
|---|---|---|---|---|---|---|---|
| Filip Cristian Jianu; Daniel Michalski (POL) | Boys' doubles | —N/a | Mu (CHN) / Tajima (JPN); L (7-6^{5}, 3-6, [4-10]) | did not advance | | | 9 |
| Selma Ștefania Cadar; Lulu Sun (SUI) | Girls' doubles | —N/a | Ma (USA) / Noel (USA); W (6-1, 6-4) | Wang Xin (CHN) / Wang Xiy (CHN); L (1-6, 6-4, [3-10]) | did not advance | | 5 |
| Selma Ștefania Cadar; Filip Cristian Jianu | Mixed doubles | Wang Xin (CHN) / Mu (CHN); L (1-6, 5-7) | did not advance | | | | 17 |

== Weightlifting ==
Romania qualified two athletes based on its performance at the 2017 World Youth Championships.

Boys

| Athlete | Event | Snatch | | Clean & Jerk | | Total | Rank |
| Athlete | Event | Result | Rank | Result | Rank | Total | Rank |
|---|---|---|---|---|---|---|---|
| Emanuel Marian Danciu | −62 kg | 115 | 3 | 143 | 3 | 258 | 4 |

Girls

| Athlete | Event | Snatch | | Clean & jerk | | Total | Rank |
| Athlete | Event | Result | Rank | Result | Rank | Total | Rank |
|---|---|---|---|---|---|---|---|
| Mihaela Cambei | −48 kg | 70 | 3 | 88 | 2 | 158 | 3rd place, bronze medalist(s) |
| Sabina Baltag | −53 kg | 77 | 2 | 100 | 1 | 177 | 1st place, gold medalist(s) |

== Wrestling ==
Key:
- VFA – Victory by Fall
- VSU – Without any points scored by the opponent
- VSU1 – With point(s) scored by the opponent
- VPO – Without any points scored by the opponent
- VPO1 – With point(s) scored by the opponent

| Athlete | Event | Group stage | | | | | Final / RM | Rank |
| Athlete | Event | Opposition Score | Opposition Score | Opposition Score | Opposition Score | Rank | Opposition Score | Rank |
|---|---|---|---|---|---|---|---|---|
| Amina Capezan | Girls' freestyle −65kg | Ramírez (CUB); W 11 – 0 ^{VSU} | Tamir (MGL); L 2 – 4 ^{VPO1} | Zhou (CHN); L 2 – 9 ^{VPO1} | Escamilla (MEX); W 10 – 0 ^{VSU} | 3 Q | Vesso (EST); L 2 – 6 ^{VFA} | 6 |
