= Tennis at the 2018 Summer Youth Olympics – Boys' doubles =

Boys' doubles at the III Summer Youth Olympic Games
- Venue: Buenos Aires Lawn Tennis Club
- Date: 8–14 October
- Competitors: 32 from 25 nations

Medalists
1st place, gold medalist(s)		Sebastián Báez; Facundo Díaz Acosta	Argentina
2nd place, silver medalist(s)		Adrian Andreev; Rinky Hijikata	Mixed-NOCs
3rd place, bronze medalist(s)		Hugo Gaston; Clément Tabur	France

Boys' doubles
- Tennis at the 2018 Summer Youth Olympics

Events
Singles	boys	girls
Doubles	boys	girls	mixed
← 2014 ·	Summer Youth Olympics	· 2022 →

These are the results for the boys' doubles event at the 2018 Summer Youth Olympics.

== Seeds ==
1. Sebastián Báez (ARG) / Facundo Díaz Acosta (ARG) (Gold medallist)
2. Nicolás Mejía (COL) / Gilbert Soares Klier Júnior (BRA) (quarterfinals)
3. Hugo Gaston (FRA) / Clément Tabur (FRA) (semifinals, Bronze medallist)
4. Yankı Erel (TUR) / Lorenzo Musetti (ITA) (first round)

== Main draw ==
=== Key ===
- Q = Qualifier
- WC = Wild card
- LL = Lucky loser
- Alt = Alternate
- ITF = ITF entry
- PR = Protected ranking
- SR = Special ranking
- SE = Special exempt
- JE = Junior exempt
- JR = Junior Accelerator Programme entrant
- CO = College Accelerator Programme entrant
- NG = Next Gen Accelerator Program entrant
- w/o = Walkover
- r = Retired
- d = Defaulted

=== Draw ===
First round
1	S Báez (ARG); F Díaz Acosta (ARG)	7	6
R Ho (TPE); C-h Tseng (TPE)	5	2
T Mu (CHN); N Tajima (JPN)	6^{5}	6	[10]
FC Jianu (ROU); D Michalski (POL)	7	3	[4]
4	Y Erel (TUR); L Musetti (ITA)	4	2
O Štyler (CZE); D Svrčina (CZE)	6	6
N Álvarez Varona (ESP); C López Montagud (ESP)	7	2	[8]
J de Jong (NED); D Wenger (SUI)	6^{7}	6	[10]
N Hardt (DOM); P Sydow (ARU)	6	6
A Dawani (BHR); D Tashbulatov (KAZ)	0	1
A Bovy (BEL); M Miladinović (SRB)	0	4
3	H Gaston (FRA); C Tabur (FRA)	6	6
P Henning (RSA); D N'tcha (BEN)	2	6^{4}
A Andreev (BUL); R Hijikata (AUS)	6	7
D Baird (USA); T Boyer (USA)	3	6^{6}
2	N Mejía (COL); G Soares Klier Júnior (BRA)	6	7

Quarter-finals
1	S Báez (ARG); F Díaz Acosta (ARG)	6	6
T Mu (CHN); N Tajima (JPN)	0	1
O Štyler (CZE); D Svrčina (CZE)	2	6	[10]
J de Jong (NED); D Wenger (SUI)	6	4	[5]
N Hardt (DOM); P Sydow (ARU)	2	2
3	H Gaston (FRA); C Tabur (FRA)	6	6
A Andreev (BUL); R Hijikata (AUS)	7	4	[10]
2	N Mejía (COL); G Soares Klier Júnior (BRA)	6^{6}	6	[7]

Semi-finals
1	S Báez (ARG); F Díaz Acosta (ARG)	7	1	[10]
O Štyler (CZE); D Svrčina (CZE)	5	6	[6]
3	H Gaston (FRA); C Tabur (FRA)	1	4
A Andreev (BUL); R Hijikata (AUS)	6	6

Final
1	S Báez (ARG); F Díaz Acosta (ARG)	6	6
A Andreev (BUL); R Hijikata (AUS)	4	4
Bronze medal match
O Štyler (CZE); D Svrčina (CZE)	7	5	[8]
3	H Gaston (FRA); C Tabur (FRA)	6^{4}	7	[10]
