= Tennis at the 2018 Summer Youth Olympics – Boys' singles =

Boys' singles at the III Summer Youth Olympic Games
- Venue: Buenos Aires Lawn Tennis Club
- Date: 7–13 October
- Competitors: 32 from 25 nations

Medalists
| 1st place, gold medalist(s) | | Hugo Gaston | France |
| 2nd place, silver medalist(s) | | Facundo Díaz Acosta | Argentina |
| 3rd place, bronze medalist(s) | | Gilbert Soares Klier Júnior | Brazil |

Boys' singles
- Tennis at the 2018 Summer Youth Olympics

Events
| Singles | boys | girls |
| Doubles | boys | girls | mixed |
| ← 2014 · | Summer Youth Olympics | · 2022 → |

These are the results for the boys' singles event at the 2018 Summer Youth Olympics.

== Seeds ==
1. Tseng Chun-hsin (TPE) (quarterfinals)
2. Sebastián Báez (ARG) (quarterfinals)
3. Hugo Gaston (FRA) (gold medallist)
4. Lorenzo Musetti (ITA) (first round)
5. Nicolás Mejía (COL) (first round)
6. Adrian Andreev (BUL) (semifinals, retired, fourth place)
7. Gilbert Soares Klier Júnior (BRA) (semifinals, bronze medallist)
8. Facundo Díaz Acosta (ARG) (final, silver medallist)

== Main draw ==
=== Key ===
- Q = Qualifier
- WC = Wild card
- LL = Lucky loser
- Alt = Alternate
- ITF = ITF entry
- PR = Protected ranking
- SR = Special ranking
- SE = Special exempt
- JE = Junior exempt
- JR = Junior Accelerator Programme entrant
- CO = College Accelerator Programme entrant
- NG = Next Gen Accelerator Program entrant
- w/o = Walkover
- r = Retired
- d = Defaulted

=== Finals ===
Semifinals
8 | Facundo Díaz Acosta (ARG) | 6 | 6
6 | Adrian Andreev (BUL) | 4 | 1
3 | Hugo Gaston (FRA) | 6 | 6
7 | Gilbert Soares Klier Júnior (BRA) | 4 | 1

Gold medal match
8 | Facundo Díaz Acosta (ARG) | 4 | 5
3 | Hugo Gaston (FRA) | 6 | 7
Bronze medal match
6 | Adrian Andreev (BUL) | 4 | 1^{r}
7 | Gilbert Soares Klier Júnior (BRA) | 6 | 3

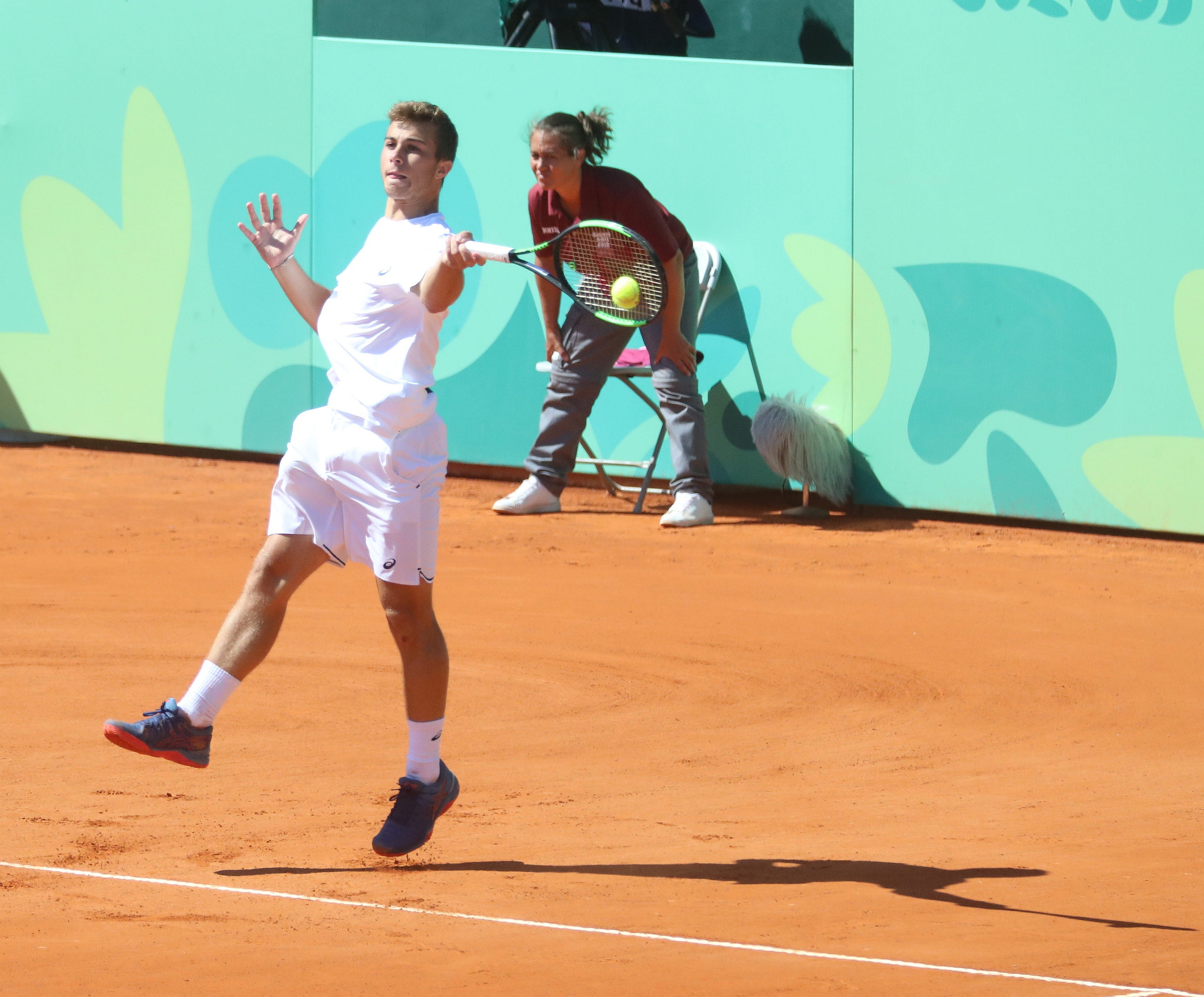
Hugo Gaston (winner) during the gold medal match

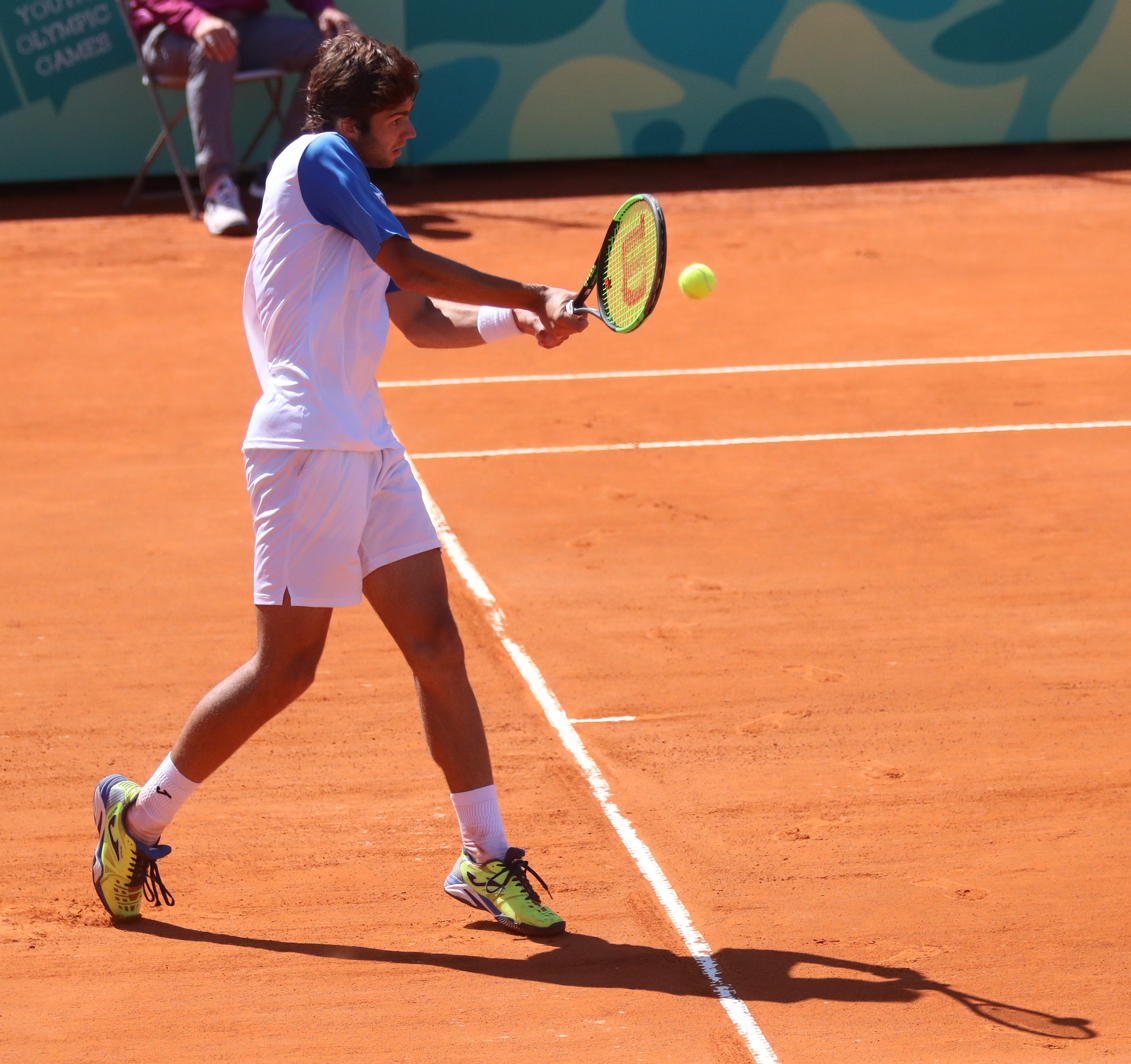
Facundo Díaz Acosta (runner-up) during the gold medal match

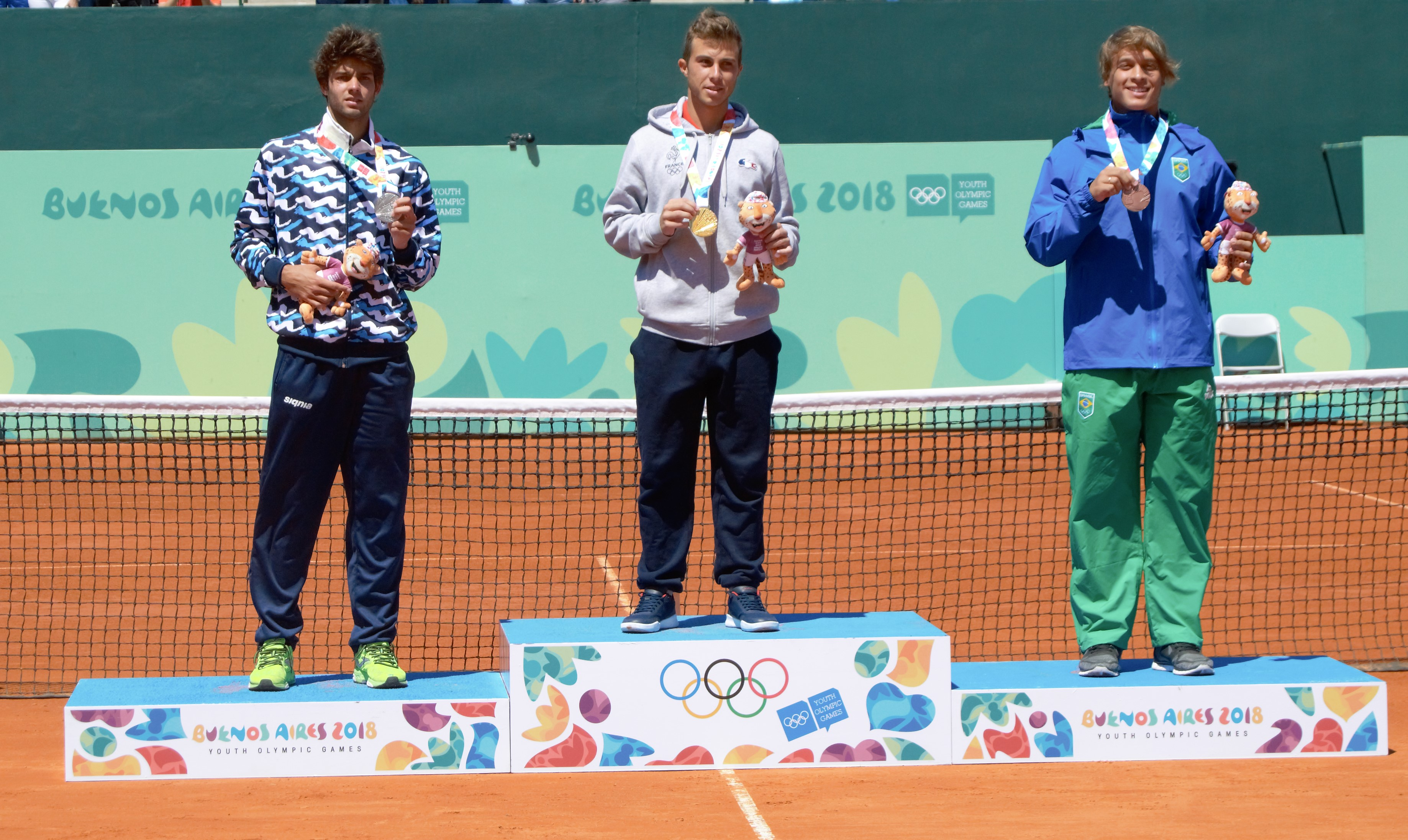
Victory ceremony of the boys' singles

=== Top half ===
First round
1 | C-h Tseng (TPE) | 6 | 6
D Tashbulatov (KAZ) | 3 | 4
R Hijikata (AUS) | 6^{2} | 6 | 0
T Mu (CHN) | 7^{7} | 2 | 6
J de Jong (NED) | 6 | 6
A Dawani (BHR) | 2 | 1
P Henning (RSA) | 0 | 3
8 | F Díaz Acosta (ARG) | 6 | 6
4 | L Musetti (ITA) | 4 | 4
FC Jianu (ROU) | 6 | 6
C Tabur (FRA) | 7 | 3 | 6
D Svrčina (CZE) | 5 | 6 | 2
T Boyer (USA) | 3 | 6^{9}
Y Erel (TUR) | 6 | 7^{11}
C López Montagud (ESP) | 6^{4} | 6 | 2
6 | A Andreev (BUL) | 7^{7} | 3 | 6

Second round
1 | C-h Tseng (TPE) | 6 | 3 | 6
T Mu (CHN) | 3 | 6 | 2
J de Jong (NED) | 6 | 4 | 3
8 | F Díaz Acosta (ARG) | 4 | 6 | 6
FC Jianu (ROU) | 6^{5} | 6 | 7
C Tabur (FRA) | 7 | 4 | 6^{3}
Y Erel (TUR) | 3 | 7 | 3
6 | A Andreev (BUL) | 6 | 5 | 6

Quarterfinals
1 | C-h Tseng (TPE) | 2 | 4
8 | F Díaz Acosta (ARG) | 6 | 6
FC Jianu (ROU) | 2 | 4
6 | A Andreev (BUL) | 6 | 6

Semifinals
8 | F Díaz Acosta (ARG) | 6 | 6
6 | A Andreev (BUL) | 4 | 1

=== Bottom half ===
First round
5 | N Mejía (COL) | 4 | 2
O Štyler (CZE) | 6 | 6
D N'tcha (BEN) | 0 | 0
D Michalski (POL) | 6 | 6
N Tajima (JPN) | 6 | 6
A Bovy (BEL) | 4 | 2
N Hardt (DOM) | 2 | 1
3 | H Gaston (FRA) | 6 | 6
7 | G Soares Klier Júnior (BRA) | 6 | 4 | 6
M Miladinović (SRB) | 4 | 6 | 2
P Sydow (ARU) | 3 | 7^{7} | 3
D Baird (USA) | 6 | 6^{5} | 6
D Wenger (SUI) | 3 | 3
N Álvarez Varona (ESP) | 6 | 6
R Ho (TPE) | 4 | 1
2 | S Báez (ARG) | 6 | 6

Second round
O Štyler (CZE) | 2 | 0
D Michalski (POL) | 6 | 6
N Tajima (JPN) | 3 | 2
3 | H Gaston (FRA) | 6 | 6
7 | G Soares Klier Júnior (BRA) | 7 | 6
D Baird (USA) | 6^{7} | 4
N Álvarez Varona (ESP) | 7 | 4 | 4
2 | S Báez (ARG) | 5 | 6 | 6

Quarterfinals
D Michalski (POL) | 4 | 1
3 | H Gaston (FRA) | 6 | 6
7 | G Soares Klier Júnior (BRA) | 6 | 6
2 | S Báez (ARG) | 4 | 4

Semifinals
3 | H Gaston (FRA) | 6 | 6
7 | G Soares Klier Júnior (BRA) | 4 | 1
