= Bulgaria at the 2018 Summer Youth Olympics =

- IOC code: BUL
- NOC: Bulgarian Olympic Committee
- Website: http://www.bgolympic.org/

in Buenos Aires, Argentina 6 – 18 October 2018
- Competitors: 24 in 14 sports
- Medals Ranked 34th: Gold 2 Silver 2 Bronze 2 Total 6

Summer Youth Olympics appearances (overview)
- 2010; 2014; 2018

Bulgaria participated at the 2018 Summer Youth Olympics in Buenos Aires, Argentina from 6 October to 18 October 2018.

== Badminton ==
Bulgaria qualified one player based on the Badminton Junior World Rankings.

Singles

Athlete	Event	Group stage				Quarterfinal	Semifinal	Final / BM	Rank
Athlete	Event	Opposition Score	Opposition Score	Opposition Score	Rank	Opposition Score	Opposition Score	Opposition Score	Rank
Maria Delcheva	Girls' Singles	Akoumba Ze (CMR); W 2–0	Prozorova (UKR); W 2–0	Vũ (VIE); L 0–2	2	did not advance			9

Team

Athlete	Event	Group stage				Quarterfinal	Semifinal	Final / BM	Rank
Athlete	Event	Opposition Score	Opposition Score	Opposition Score	Rank	Opposition Score	Opposition Score	Opposition Score	Rank
Team Alpha; Maria Delcheva (BUL); Lakshya Sen (IND); Giovanni Toti (ITA); Vannthoun Vath (CAM); Brian Yang (CAN); Hasini Nusaka Ambalangodage (SRI); Jennie Gai (USA); Ashwathi Pillai (SWE)	Mixed Teams	Epsilon (MIX); W 110–98	Delta (MIX); L 99–110	Zeta (MIX); W 110–103	2 Q	Gamma (MIX); W 110–94	Theta (MIX); W 110–90	Omega (MIX); W 110–106	1st place, gold medalist(s)

== Boxing ==
Athlete	Event	Preliminaries	Semifinals	Final / RM	Rank
Athlete	Event	Opposition Result	Opposition Result	Opposition Result	Rank
Goryanana Stoeva	Girls' -51 kg	Kholmatova (UZB); W 5–0	Gbadamosi (NGR); L 1–4	Garcia (USA); L 0–5	4

== Fencing ==
Bulgaria qualified one athlete based on its performance at the 2018 Cadet World Championship.

- Girls' Sabre – Yoana Ilieva

== Gymnastics ==
=== Acrobatic ===
Bulgaria qualified a mixed pair based on its performance at the 2018 Acrobatic Gymnastics World Championship.

- Mixed pair – 1 team of 2 athletes

=== Rhythmic ===
Bulgaria qualified one rhythmic gymnast based on its performance at the European qualification event.

- Girls' rhythmic individual all-around – 1 quota

== Judo ==
Individual

Athlete	Event	Round of 16	Quarterfinals	Semifinals	Rep 1	Rep 2	Rep 3	Final / BM	
Athlete	Event	Opposition Result	Opposition Result	Opposition Result	Opposition Result	Opposition Result	Opposition Result	Opposition Result	Rank
Aleksa Georgieva	Girls' 44 kg	Vusala Karimova (AZE); L 00-10	did not advance		Soniya Bhatta (NEP); W 10-00	Erza Muminoviq (KOS); L 00-10s1	did not advance		

Team

Athletes	Event	Round of 16	Quarterfinals	Semifinals	Final	
Athletes	Event	Opposition Result	Opposition Result	Opposition Result	Opposition Result	Rank
Team Atlanta; Tiguidanke Camara (GUI); Aleksa Georgieva (BUL); Vusala Karimova (AZE); Adrián Medero (PUR); Rok Pogorevc (SLO); Fatine Rzal (MAR); Adrian Sulca (ROU); Antonio Tornal (DOM)	Mixed team	Team Barcelona (MIX); W 4–3	Team Barcelona (MIX); L 3–4	did not advance		

== Shooting ==
Bulgaria qualified one sport shooter based on its performance at the 2017 European Championships. They also qualified a rifle sport shooter based on its performance at the 2018 European Championships.

- Boys' 10m Air Rifle – 1 quota
- Boys' 10m Air Pistol – 1 quota

Individual

Athlete	Event	Qualification		Final	
Athlete	Event	Points	Rank	Points	Rank
Plamen Emilov	Boys' 10 metre air rifle	612.4	16	did not advance	
Kiril Kirov	Boys' 10 metre air pistol	562-14x	11	did not advance	

Team

Athletes	Event	Qualification		Round of 16	Quarterfinals	Semifinals	Final / BM	Rank
Athletes	Event	Points	Rank	Opposition Result	Opposition Result	Opposition Result	Opposition Result	Rank
Wang Zeru (CHN); Plamen Emilov (BUL)	Mixed 10 metre air rifle	819.8	13Q	Kemppi (FIN); Firmapaz (ARG); L 9–10	did not advance			14
Vanessa Seeger (GER); Kiril Kirov (BUL)	Mixed 10 metre air pistol	754	3 Q	Nicolas (FRA); Miller (GBR); W 10–5	Juana Rueda Vargas (COL); Jan Luca Karstedt (GER); W 10–5	Al-Kaabi (IRQ); Son (BEL); W 10–6	Bhaker (IND); Fayzullaev (TJK); W 10–3	1st place, gold medalist(s)

== Sport climbing ==
Bulgaria qualified one sport climber based on its performance at the 2017 World Youth Sport Climbing Championships.

- Boys' combined – 1 quota (Petar Ivanov)

== Tennis ==
Key

- r = Retired

Singles

Athlete	Event	Round of 32	Round of 16	Quarterfinals	Semifinals	Final / BM	
Athlete	Event	Opposition Score	Opposition Score	Opposition Score	Opposition Score	Opposition Score	Rank
Adrian Andreev	Boys' singles	López Montagud (ESP); W (7^{7}-6^{4}, 3–6, 6–2)	Erel (TUR); W (6–3, 5–7, 6–3)	Jianu (ROU); W (6–2, 6–4)	Díaz Acosta (ARG); L (4–6, 1–6)	Soares Klier Júnior (BRA); L (4–6, 1^{r}-3)	4

Doubles

Athletes	Event	Round of 32	Round of 16	Quarterfinals	Semifinals	Final / BM	
Athletes	Event	Opposition Score	Opposition Score	Opposition Score	Opposition Score	Opposition Score	Rank
Adrian Andreev; Rinky Hijikata (AUS)	Boys' doubles	—N/a	Henning (RSA) / N'tcha (BEN); W (6–2, 7–6^{4})	Mejía (COL) / Soares Klier Júnior (BRA); W (7–6^{6}, 4–6, [10–7])	Gaston (FRA) / Tabur (FRA); W (6–1, 6–4)	Báez (ARG) / Díaz Acosta (ARG); L (4–6, 4–6)	2nd place, silver medalist(s)
Viktoriia Dema (UKR); Adrian Andreev	Mixed doubles	Sun (SUI) / Wenger (SUI); L (3-6, 6^{3}-7)	did not advance				17

== Weightlifting ==
Bulgaria qualified one athlete based on its performance at the 2017 World Youth Championships.

Boy

Athlete	Event	Snatch		Clean & Jerk		Total	Rank
Athlete	Event	Result	Rank	Result	Rank	Total	Rank
Hristo Hristov	+85 kg	173	1	206	2	379	2nd place, silver medalist(s)

Girl

Athlete	Event	Snatch		Clean & jerk		Total	Rank
Athlete	Event	Result	Rank	Result	Rank	Total	Rank
Galya Shatova	−63 kg	90	2	111	3	201	3rd place, bronze medalist(s)

== Wrestling ==
Key:
- VSU – Without any point scored by the opponent
- VSU1 – With point(s) scored by the opponent
- VPO1 – With point(s) scored by the opponent

Athlete	Event	Group stage			Final / RM	Rank
Athlete	Event	Opposition Score	Opposition Score	Rank	Opposition Score	Rank
Edmond Nazaryan	Boys' Greco-Roman −45kg	Dehbozorgi (IRI); L 1 – 3 ^{VPO1}	Shaaban (EGY); W 14 – 5 ^{VSU1}	2 Q	Zakirbayev (TKM); W 8 – 0 ^{VSU}	3rd place, bronze medalist(s)
