= Tennis at the 2018 Summer Youth Olympics – Girls' doubles =

Girls' doubles at the III Summer Youth Olympic Games
- Venue: Buenos Aires Lawn Tennis Club
- Date: 7–13 October
- Competitors: 32 from 25 nations

Medalists
1st place, gold medalist(s)		Kaja Juvan; Iga Świątek	Mixed-NOCs
2nd place, silver medalist(s)		Yuki Naito; Naho Sato	Japan
3rd place, bronze medalist(s)		Wang Xinyu; Wang Xiyu	China

Girls' doubles
- Tennis at the 2018 Summer Youth Olympics

Events
Singles	boys	girls
Doubles	boys	girls	mixed
- Summer Youth Olympics

These are the results for the girls' doubles event at the 2018 Summer Youth Olympics.

== Seeds ==
1. Wang Xinyu (CHN) / Wang Xiyu (CHN) (semifinals, Bronze medallist)
2. Kaja Juvan (SLO) / Iga Świątek (POL) (gold medallist)
3. Joanna Garland (TPE) / Liang En-shuo (TPE) (first round)
4. Yuki Naito (JPN) / Naho Sato (JPN) (final, Silver medallist)

== Main draw ==
Key

- Q = Qualifier
- WC = Wild card
- LL = Lucky loser
- Alt = Alternate
- ITF = ITF entry
- PR = Protected ranking
- SR = Special ranking
- SE = Special exempt
- JE = Junior exempt
- JR = Junior Accelerator Programme entrant
- CO = College Accelerator Programme entrant
- NG = Next Gen Accelerator Program entrant
- w/o = Walkover
- r = Retired
- d = Defaulted

=== Draw ===
First round
1	Xin Wang (CHN); Xiy Wang (CHN)	6	6
V Kanapatskaya (BLR); D Vismane (LAT)	0	4
SȘ Cadar (ROU); L Sun (SUI)	6	6
L Ma (USA); A Noel (USA)	1	4
4	Y Naito (JPN); N Sato (JPN)	6	7
G Drummy (IRL); A Makatsaria (GEO)	1	5
V Ivanov (NZL); T Naklo (THA)	1	3
M Bilokin (UKR); V Dema (UKR)	6	6
S Nahimana (BDI); MG Rivera Corado (GUA)	4	4
ML Carlé (ARG); C Osorio (COL)	6	6
K Rakhimova (RUS); O Selekhmeteva (RUS)	6	6
3	J Garland (TPE); E-s Liang (TPE)	0	1
C Burel (FRA); D Parry (FRA)	6	3	[10]
F Curmi (MLT); E Molinaro (LUX)	4	6	[5]
E Cocciaretto (ITA); S Zünd (LIE)	0	2
2	K Juvan (SLO); I Świątek (POL)	6	6

Quarter-finals
1	Xin Wang (CHN); Xiy Wang (CHN)	6	4	[10]
SȘ Cadar (ROU); L Sun (SUI)	1	6	[3]
4	Y Naito (JPN); N Sato (JPN)	7	5	[10]
M Bilokin (UKR); V Dema (UKR)	5	7	[8]
ML Carlé (ARG); C Osorio (COL)	7	3	[10]
K Rakhimova (RUS); O Selekhmeteva (RUS)	5	6	[7]
C Burel (FRA); D Parry (FRA)	0	4
2	K Juvan (SLO); I Świątek (POL)	6	6

Semi-finals
1	Xin Wang (CHN); Xiy Wang (CHN)	6	4	[6]
4	Y Naito (JPN); N Sato (JPN)	4	6	[10]
ML Carlé (ARG); C Osorio (COL)	2	2
2	K Juvan (SLO); I Świątek (POL)	6	6

Final
4	Y Naito (JPN); N Sato (JPN)	7	5	[4]
2	K Juvan (SLO); I Świątek (POL)	6^{5}	7	[10]
Bronze-medal match
1	Xin Wang (CHN); Xiy Wang (CHN)	7	6
ML Carlé (ARG); C Osorio (COL)	5	3
