= Serbia at the 2018 Summer Youth Olympics =

- IOC code: SRB
- NOC: Olympic Committee of Serbia
- Website: http://www.oks.org.rs/

in Buenos Aires, Argentina 6 – 18 October 2018
- Competitors: 16 in 8 sports
- Flag bearer: Anja Crevar
- Medals Ranked 66th: Gold 0 Silver 2 Bronze 3 Total 5

Summer Youth Olympics appearances
- 2010; 2014; 2018; 2026

Serbia participated at the 2018 Summer Youth Olympics in Buenos Aires, Argentina from 6 October to 18 October 2018.

== Competitors ==
Sport	Boys	Girls	Total
Athletics	1	2	3
Gymnastics, Artistic	1	0	1
Karate	0	1	1
Shooting	1	1	1
Swimming	2	2	4
Table tennis	0	1	1
Taekwondo	2	1	3
Tennis	1	0	1
Total	8	8	16

== Medalists ==
Medal	Name	Sport	Event	Date
Silver	Anja Crevar	Swimming	Girls' 200 m individual medley	7 October
Silver	Nadica Božanić	Taekwondo	Girls' 63 kg	10 October
Bronze	Aleksa Mitrović	Shooting	Boys' 10 m air rifle	7 October
Bronze	Marija Malić	Shooting	Girls' 10 m air rifle	8 October
Bronze	Ivana Perović	Karate	Girls' 59 kg	17 October

== Athletics ==
Boys
Field events

Athlete	Event	Stage 1		Stage 2		Total	
Athlete	Event	Result	Rank	Result	Rank	Result	Rank
Nikola Mujanović	High jump	2.00	12	2.07	8	4.07	10

Girls
Track & road events

Athlete	Event	Stage 1		Stage 2		Total	
Athlete	Event	Result	Rank	Result	Rank	Result	Rank
Nikolina Mandić	800 m	2:20.35	21	2:19.43	19	4:39.78	20
Ivana Ilić	200 m	25.15	12	24.63	15	49.78	13

== Gymnastics ==
=== Artistic ===
Serbia qualified one gymnast based on its performance at the 2018 European Junior Championship.

- Boys' artistic individual all-around – Vlada Raković

Individual Qualification

Athlete	Event	Apparatus						Total	Rank
Athlete	Event	F	PH	R	V	PB	HB	Total	Rank
Vlada Raković	Individual	2.666	9.900	12.766	12.800	12.333	12.700 Q	73.165	22
Vlada Raković	Horizontal bar	—N/a					12.691	12.691	6

=== Multidiscipline ===
Team	Athlete	Acrobatic	Artistic	Rhythmic	Trampoline	Total points	Rank
Team Marina Chernova (Light Green)	Arina Yulusheva (UZB); Nikolay Evdokimov (UZB)	30	—N/a			492	12
Team Marina Chernova (Light Green)	Nguyễn Văn Khánh Phong (VIE)	—N/a	48	—N/a		492	12
Team Marina Chernova (Light Green)	Vlada Raković (SRB)	—N/a	61	—N/a		492	12
Team Marina Chernova (Light Green)	Oļegs Ivanovs (LAT)	—N/a	55	—N/a		492	12
Team Marina Chernova (Light Green)	Lisa Conradie (RSA)	—N/a	59	—N/a		492	12
Team Marina Chernova (Light Green)	Olivia Araujo (ARG)	—N/a	18	—N/a		492	12
Team Marina Chernova (Light Green)	Emma Slevin (IRL)	—N/a	33	—N/a		492	12
Team Marina Chernova (Light Green)	Lee So-yun (KOR)	—N/a		57	—N/a	492	12
Team Marina Chernova (Light Green)	Jennifer Rivera (COL)	—N/a		86	—N/a	492	12
Team Marina Chernova (Light Green)	Antonella Genuzio (BOL)	—N/a		20	—N/a	492	12
Team Marina Chernova (Light Green)	Ivan Litvinovich (BLR)	—N/a			2	492	12
Team Marina Chernova (Light Green)	Thalia Loveira (NAM)	—N/a			23	492	12

== Karate ==
Serbia qualified one athlete based on its performance at one of the Karate Qualification Tournaments.

Athlete	Event	Group phase				Semifinal	Final	
Athlete	Event	Opposition Score	Opposition Score	Opposition Score	Rank	Opposition Score	Opposition Score	Rank
Ivana Perović	Girls' 59 kg	Baranyi (HUN); W 2–0	Ossipova (EST); W 8–0	Sakaji (JPN); L 0–1	2 Q	Chernysheva (RUS); L 0–0*	Did not advance	3rd place, bronze medalist(s)

== Shooting ==
Serbia qualified two sport shooters based on its performance at the 2017 European Championships.

Individual

Athlete	Event	Qualification		Final	
Athlete	Event	Points	Rank	Points	Rank
Aleksa Mitrović	Boys' 10m Air Rifle	620.4	6 Q	227.9	3rd place, bronze medalist(s)
Marija Malić	Girls' 10m Air Rifle	621.7	7 Q	226.2	3rd place, bronze medalist(s)

Team

Athletes	Event	Qualification		Round of 16	Quarterfinals	Semifinals	Final / BM	Rank
Athletes	Event	Points	Rank	Opposition Result	Opposition Result	Opposition Result	Opposition Result	Rank
Marija Malić (SRB); Amar Dizdarević (BIH)	Mixed Team 10m Air Rifle	821.1	11Q	Anastasiia Dereviagina (RUS); Ismael Edson Ramos Ramirez (MEX); L 4–10	Did not advance			13
Aleksa Mitrović (SRB); Isidora Van de Perre (CHI)	Mixed Team 10m Air Rifle	811.7	17	Did not advance				17

== Swimming ==
Boys

Athlete	Event	Heats		Semifinals		Final	
Athlete	Event	Time	Rank	Time	Rank	Time	Rank
Dušan Babić	100 m freestyle	51.71	23	Did not advance			
Dušan Babić	200 m freestyle	1:51.91	17	—N/a		Did not advance	
Dušan Babić	200 m individual medley	2:06.05	13	—N/a		Did not advance	
Boris Laćanski	400 m freestyle	4:02.06	27	—N/a		Did not advance	
Boris Laćanski	800 m freestyle	8:16.17	18	—N/a		Did not advance	

Girls

Athlete	Event	Heat		Semifinals		Final	
Athlete	Event	Time	Rank	Time	Rank	Time	Rank
Anja Crevar	400 m freestyle	4:22.89	19	—N/a		Did not advance	
Anja Crevar	200 m individual medley	2:15.55	4 Q	—N/a		2:13.98	2nd place, silver medalist(s)
Mila Medić	50 m breaststroke	32.99	19	Did not advance			
Mila Medić	100 m breaststroke	1:12.14	28	Did not advance			

== Table tennis ==
Serbia qualified one table tennis player based on its performance at the Road to Buenos Aires (Africa) series.

Singles

Athlete	Event	Group stage	Rank	Round of 16	Quarterfinals	Semifinals	Final / BM	Rank
Athlete	Event	Opposition Score	Rank	Opposition Score	Opposition Score	Opposition Score	Opposition Score	Rank
Sabina Šurjan	Girls	Group E Tatiana Kukuľková (SVK); W 4–3	2	Bruna Takahashi (BRA); L 0–4	Did not advance			9
Sabina Šurjan	Girls	Amy Wang (USA); L 0–4	2	Bruna Takahashi (BRA); L 0–4	Did not advance			9
Sabina Šurjan	Girls	Choi Hae-eun (KOR); W 4–2	2	Bruna Takahashi (BRA); L 0–4	Did not advance			9

Team

Athletes	Event	Group stage	Rank	Round of 16	Quarterfinals	Semifinals	Final / BM	Rank
Athletes	Event	Opposition Score	Rank	Opposition Score	Opposition Score	Opposition Score	Opposition Score	Rank
Europe 1 Sabina Šurjan (SRB); Truls Moregard (SWE)	Mixed	Zdena Blašková (CZE); Medardas Stankevičius (LTU); W 3–0	1	Jamila Laurenti / Matteo Mutti (ITA); W 2–0	Aleksandra Vovk (SLO); Vladislav Ursu (MDA); W 2–0	Miu Hirano / Tomokazu Harimoto (JPN); L 1–2	Su Pei-ling / Lin Yun-ju (TPE); L 1–2	4
Europe 1 Sabina Šurjan (SRB); Truls Moregard (SWE)	Mixed	Janina Anna Wegrzyn (POL); Maciej Kolodziejczyk (AUT); W 3–0	1	Jamila Laurenti / Matteo Mutti (ITA); W 2–0	Aleksandra Vovk (SLO); Vladislav Ursu (MDA); W 2–0	Miu Hirano / Tomokazu Harimoto (JPN); L 1–2	Su Pei-ling / Lin Yun-ju (TPE); L 1–2	4
Europe 1 Sabina Šurjan (SRB); Truls Moregard (SWE)	Mixed	Pyon Song-gyong / Kim Song-gun (PRK); W 2–1	1	Jamila Laurenti / Matteo Mutti (ITA); W 2–0	Aleksandra Vovk (SLO); Vladislav Ursu (MDA); W 2–0	Miu Hirano / Tomokazu Harimoto (JPN); L 1–2	Su Pei-ling / Lin Yun-ju (TPE); L 1–2	4

== Taekwondo ==
Athlete	Event	Round of 16	Quarterfinals	Semifinals	Final / BM	
Athlete	Event	Opposition Result	Opposition Result	Opposition Result	Opposition Result	Rank
Bogdan Bulat	Boys' −55 kg	Amadou T Mahamadou Maharana (NIG); L 7–19	Did not advance			
Dušan Božanić	Boys' −73 kg	Bye	Darlyn Padilla (ECU); L 20–23	Did not advance		
Nadica Božanić	Girls' −63 kg	Bye	Lucija Domić (CRO); W 13–7	Assunta Cennamo (ITA); W 16–4	Yalda Valinejad (IRI); L 17–23	2nd place, silver medalist(s)

== Tennis ==
Singles

Athlete	Event	Round of 32	Round of 16	Quarterfinals	Semifinals	Final / BM	Rank
Athlete	Event	Opposition Score	Opposition Score	Opposition Score	Opposition Score	Opposition Score	Rank
Marko Miladinović	Boys' Singles	Gilbert Soares Klier Junior (BRA); L 1–2; 4–6, 6–4, 2–6	Did not advance				17

Doubles

Athletes	Event	Round of 32	Round of 16	Quarterfinals	Semifinals	Final / BM	Rank
Athletes	Event	Opposition Score	Opposition Score	Opposition Score	Opposition Score	Opposition Score	Rank
Marko Miladinović (SRB); Arnaud Bovy (BEL)	Boys' Doubles	—N/a	Hugo Gaston (FRA); Clement Tabur (FRA); L 0–2; 0–6, 4–6	Did not advance			9
Marko Miladinović (SRB); Kaja Juvan (SLO)	Mixed Doubles	Viktoryia Kanapatskaya (BLR); Arnaud Bovy (BEL); W 2–0; 6–4, 6–4	Sada Nahimana (BDI); Philip Henning (RSA); W 2–1; 6–2, 4–6, [10]–[8]	Clara Burel (FRA); Hugo Gaston (FRA); L 1–2; 2–6, 7–5, [9]–[11]	Did not advance		5
