= Dominican Republic at the 2018 Summer Youth Olympics =

- IOC code: DOM
- NOC: Dominican Republic Olympic Committee
- Website: https://www.colimdo.org/

in Buenos Aires, Argentina 6 – 18 October 2018
- Competitors: 20 in 9 sports
- Medals Ranked 57th: Gold 1 Silver 0 Bronze 1 Total 2

Summer Youth Olympics appearances
- 2010; 2014; 2018; 2026

Dominican Republic participated at the 2018 Summer Youth Olympics in Buenos Aires, Argentina from 6 October to 18 October 2018.

== Archery ==
Dominican Republic qualified one archer based on its performance at the American Continental Qualification Tournament.

Individual

Athlete	Event	Ranking round		Round of 32	Round of 16	Quarterfinals	Semifinals	Final / BM	Rank
Athlete	Event	Score	Seed	Opposition Score	Opposition Score	Opposition Score	Opposition Score	Opposition Score	Rank
Stefany Jerez	Girls' Individual	639	15	Reddig (NAM); L 5–6	did not advance				17

Team

Athletes	Event	Ranking round		Round of 32	Round of 16	Quarterfinals	Semifinals	Final / BM	Rank
Athletes	Event	Score	Seed	Opposition Score	Opposition Score	Opposition Score	Opposition Score	Opposition Score	Rank
Stefany Jerez (DOM); Mateus de Carvalho Almeida (BRA)	Mixed team	1301	9	Satır (TUR); Akash (IND); L 3–5	did not advance				17

== Badminton ==
Dominican Republic qualified one player based on the Badminton Junior World Rankings.

Singles

Athlete	Event	Group stage				Quarterfinal	Semifinal	Final / BM	Rank
Athlete	Event	Opposition Score	Opposition Score	Opposition Score	Rank	Opposition Score	Opposition Score	Opposition Score	Rank
Nairoby Abigail Jimenez	Girls' Singles	Ambalangodage (SRI); L (14–21, 16–21)	Ilori (NGR); W (21–17, 21–9)	Chaiwan (THA); L (9–21, 5–21)	3	did not advance			9

Team

Athlete	Event	Group stage				Quarterfinal	Semifinal	Final / BM	Rank
Athlete	Event	Opposition Score	Opposition Score	Opposition Score	Rank	Opposition Score	Opposition Score	Opposition Score	Rank
Team Zeta; Nairoby Abigail Jiménez (DOM); Danylo Bosniuk (UKR); Christopher Grimley (GBR); Kettiya Keoxay (LAO); Nhat Nguyen (IRL); Maharani Sekar Batari (INA); Jaslyn Hooi (SGP); Vivien Sándorházi (HUN)	Mixed Teams	Delta (MIX); L (95–110)	Epsilon (MIX); W (110–89)	Alpha (MIX); L (103–110)	3Q	Sigma (MIX); W (110–106)	Omega (MIX); L (109–110)	Theta (MIX); L (107–110)	4

== Futsal ==
Summary

Team	Event	Group Stage					Semifinal	Final / BM	
Team	Event	Opposition score	Opposition score	Opposition score	Opposition score	Rank	Opposition score	Opposition score	Rank
Dominica	Girls' tournament	Cameroon; L 1–9	Chile; D 1–1	Japan; L 2–6	Portugal; L 0–14	2	did not advance		9

Group D

Pos	Team	Pld	W	D	L	GF	GA	GD	Pts	Qualification
1	Portugal	4	4	0	0	37	2	+35	12	Semi-finals
2	Japan	4	3	0	1	16	7	+9	9	Semi-finals
3	Cameroon	4	2	0	2	16	13	+3	6	
4	Chile	4	0	1	3	6	27	−21	1	
5	Dominican Republic	4	0	1	3	6	32	−26	1	

Source: FIFA IOC
7 October 2018
14:00

Dominican Republic	1–9	Cameroon
Muñiz 31'	Report (FIFA); Report (IOC) Category:Futsal at the 2018 Summer Youth Olympics – Girls First Round – DOM-CRM on Wikimedia Commons	Tchomte 9', 11', 13'; Ndzana 17', 35', 39'; Mbomozomo 22', 32'; Mbofewuie 37'

CeNARD
Attendance: 0
Referee: Gelareh Nazemi (Iran)
9 October 2018
14:00

Portugal	14–0	Dominican Republic
Silva 7', 23'; Carol 10', 19', 26', 30'; Leninha 13', 22', 28'; Martinha 15', 29'; Sanheiro 27'; Fifó 29', 32'	Report (FIFA); Report (IOC)

Tecnópolis
Attendance: 1,600
Referee: Diego Molina (Costa Rica)
11 October 2018
14:00

Japan	6–2	Dominican Republic
Yokoyama 7'; Oino 9'; Ikeuchi 18'; Abe 19'; Arai 22'; Maeda 27'	Report (FIFA); Report (IOC)	Collado 3', 4'

Tecnópolis
Attendance: 2,085
Referee: Tayana Moreno (Venezuela)
13 October 2018
14:00

Dominican Republic	3–3	Chile
Muñiz 1'; Ditrén 7', 27'	Report (FIFA); Report (IOC)	Aguirre 26'; Pérez 36'; Keefe 40' (pen.)

Tecnópolis
Attendance: 1,960
Referee: Lee Po-fu (Chinese Taipei)

== Judo ==
Individual

Athlete	Event	Round of 16	Quarterfinals	Semifinals	Rep 1	Rep 2	Final / BM	Rank
Athlete	Event	Opposition Result	Opposition Result	Opposition Result	Opposition Result	Opposition Result	Opposition Result	Rank
Antonio Tornal	Boys' 66 kg	Kimy Bravo (CUB); W 10-00s2	Jalen Kon Elijah (CMR); W 10-00	Vugar Talibov (AZE); L 00s1-01s2	Bye		Jaykhunbek Nazarov (UZB); W 10s1-00s3	3rd place, bronze medalist(s)
Omaria Ramírez	Girls' 78 kg	Maral Mardani (IRI); W 10-00	Eduarda Rosa (BRA); L 00s2-01	did not advance	Bye	Alaa Mousaad Mohamed (EGY); L 00-10	did not advance	

Team

Athletes	Event	Round of 16	Quarterfinals	Semifinals	Final	Rank
Athletes	Event	Opposition Result	Opposition Result	Opposition Result	Opposition Result	Rank
Team Atlanta; Tiguidanke Camara (GUI); Aleksa Georgieva (BUL); Vusala Karimova (AZE); Adrián Medero (PUR); Rok Pogorevc (SLO); Fatine Rzal (MAR); Adrian Sulca (ROU); Antonio Tornal (DOM)	Mixed Team	Team Barcelona (MIX); W 4–3	Team Barcelona (MIX); L 3–4	did not advance		9
Seoul; Mohammed Al-Mishri (LBA); Alex Barto (SVK); Sairy Colón (PUR); María Giménez (VEN); Yuri Israelyan (ARM); Kim Ju-hee (KOR); Omaria Ramírez (DOM); Wu Xiao-zhang (TPE)	Mixed Team	Los Angeles; L 3–5	Did not advance			9

== Sailing ==
Dominican Republic qualified one boat based on its performance at the North American and Caribbean IKA Twin Tip Qualifiers. They later qualified a boat in the boys' event based on its performance at the 2018 IKA Twin Tip Racing Youth World Championship.

Athlete	Event	Race												Total Points	Net Points	Final Rank
Athlete	Event	1	2	3	4	5	6	7	8	9	10	11	12	Total Points	Net Points	Final Rank
Deury Corniel	Boys' IKA Twin Tip Racing	1	1	1	(6)	(6)	1	CAN						16	4	1st place, gold medalist(s)
Paula Herrmann	Girls' IKA Twin Tip Racing	6	4	(9)	6	(9)	8	CAN						42	24	9

== Tennis ==
Singles

Athlete	Event	Round of 32	Round of 16	Quarterfinals	Semifinals	Final / BM	
Athlete	Event	Opposition Score	Opposition Score	Opposition Score	Opposition Score	Opposition Score	Rank
N Hardt	Boys' singles	H Gaston (FRA); L (2-6, 1-6)	did not advance				

Doubles

Athletes	Event	Round of 32	Round of 16	Quarterfinals	Semifinals	Final / BM	
Athletes	Event	Opposition Score	Opposition Score	Opposition Score	Opposition Score	Opposition Score	Rank
N Hardt (DOM); P Sydow (ARU)	Boys' doubles	A Dawani (BHR); D Tashbulatov (KAZ); W (6-0, 6-1)	H Gaston (FRA); C Tabur (FRA); L (2-6, 2-6)	did not advance			
MG Rivera Corado (GUA); N Hardt (DOM)	Mixed doubles	V Ivanov (NZL); R Hijikata (AUS); W (3-6, 6-4, 10-7)	J Garland (TPE); C-h Tseng (TPE); L (4-6, 2-6)	did not advance			

== Weightlifting ==
Athlete	Event	Snatch		Clean & jerk		Total	Rank
Athlete	Event	Result	Rank	Result	Rank	Total	Rank
Dahiana Ortiz	Girls' −48 kg	70	3	86	4	156	4
