= Liechtenstein at the 2018 Summer Youth Olympics =

- IOC code: LIE
- NOC: Liechtenstein Olympic Committee
- Website: www.olympic.li

in Buenos Aires, Argentina 6 – 18 October 2018
- Competitors: 3 in 2 sports
- Medals: Gold 0 Silver 0 Bronze 0 Total 0

Summer Youth Olympics appearances
- 2010; 2014; 2018

Liechtenstein participated at the 2018 Summer Youth Olympics in Buenos Aires, Argentina from 6 October to 18 October 2018.

== Competitors ==
Sport	Boys	Girls	Total
Swimming	1	1	2
Tennis	0	1	1
Total	1	2	3

== Swimming ==
Athlete	Event	Heats		Semifinals		Final	
Athlete	Event	Time	Rank	Time	Rank	Time	Rank
Simon Greuter	Boys' 50 metre breaststroke	31.13	21	did not advance			
Simon Greuter	Boys' 100 metre breaststroke	1:08.12	32	did not advance			
Theresa Hefel	Girls' 50 metre butterfly	29.52	33	did not advance			
Theresa Hefel	Girls' 100 metre butterfly	1:06.81	29	did not advance			

== Tennis ==
Athlete	Event	Round of 32	Round of 16	Quarterfinals	Semifinals	Final / BM
Athlete	Event	Opposition Score	Opposition Score	Opposition Score	Opposition Score	Opposition Score
Sylvie Zünd	Girls' singles	A Makatsaria (GEO); W (7-5, 6-3)	Xin Wang (CHN); L (4-6, 0-6)	did not advance		
Elisabetta Cocciaretto (ITA); Sylvie Zünd (LIE)	Girls' doubles	—	Juvan (SLO) / Świątek (POL); L (0-6, 2-6)	did not advance		
Nicolás Álvarez Varona (ESP); Sylvie Zünd (LIE)	Mixed Doubles	Carlé (ARG); Báez (ARG); L 6-4, 6-2	did not advance			
