= Malta at the 2018 Summer Youth Olympics =

- IOC code: MLT
- NOC: Malta Olympic Committee
- Website: https://nocmalta.org/

in Buenos Aires, Argentina 6 – 18 October 2018
- Competitors: 4 in 4 sports
- Medals: Gold 0 Silver 0 Bronze 0 Total 0

Summer Youth Olympics appearances
- 2010; 2014; 2018

Malta participated at the 2018 Summer Youth Olympics in Buenos Aires, Argentina from 6 October to 18 October 2018.

== Swimming ==
Boys

Athlete	Event	Heat		Semifinal		Final	
Athlete	Event	Time	Rank	Time	Rank	Time	Rank
Rudi Spiteri	50 m freestyle	24.35	33	did not advance			

== Tennis ==
Singles

Athlete	Event	Round of 32	Round of 16	Quarterfinals	Semifinals	Final / BM	
Athlete	Event	Opposition Score	Opposition Score	Opposition Score	Opposition Score	Opposition Score	Rank
Francesca Curmi	Girls' singles	Burel (FRA); L (5-7, 4-6)	did not advance				

Doubles

Athletes	Event	Round of 32	Round of 16	Quarterfinals	Semifinals	Final / BM	
Athletes	Event	Opposition Score	Opposition Score	Opposition Score	Opposition Score	Opposition Score	Rank
F Curmi (MLT); E Molinaro (LUX)	Girls' doubles	C Burel (FRA); D Parry (FRA); L 4-6, 6-3, 5-10	did not advance				
Facundo Díaz Acosta (ARG); Francesca Curmi (MLT)	Mixed doubles	Garland (TPE) / Chun-hsin (TPE); L 2–6, 6–3, [3–10]	did not advance				

== Weightlifting ==
Malta was given a quota by the tripartite committee to compete in weightlifting.

Athlete	Event	Snatch		Clean & jerk		Total	Rank
Athlete	Event	Result	Rank	Result	Rank	Total	Rank
Shelby Mangion Vassallo	Girls' -63 kg	62	10	76	10	138	10
