= Bahrain at the 2018 Summer Youth Olympics =

- IOC code: BRN
- NOC: Bahrain Olympic Committee
- Website: http://www.boc.bh/

in Buenos Aires, Argentina 6 – 18 October 2018
- Competitors: 4 in 3 sports
- Medals: Gold 0 Silver 0 Bronze 0 Total 0

Summer Youth Olympics appearances
- 2010; 2014; 2018

Bahrain participated at the 2018 Summer Youth Olympics in Buenos Aires, Argentina from 6 October to 18 October 2018.

== Athletics ==
Track and road events

Athlete	Event	Stage 1		Stage 2		Total	
Athlete	Event	Result	Rank	Result	Rank	Total	Rank
Yusuf Anan	Boys' 400 metres	DSQ					
Marwa Alajooz	Girls' 100 metres	13.60	29	13.18	28	13.60	28

== Tennis ==
Singles

Athlete	Event	Round of 32	Round of 16	Quarterfinals	Semifinals	Final / BM	
Athlete	Event	Opposition Score	Opposition Score	Opposition Score	Opposition Score	Opposition Score	Rank
A Dawani	Boys' singles	de Jong (NED); L 0–2	did not qualify				

Doubles

Athlete	Event	Round of 32	Round of 16	Quarterfinals	Semifinals	Final / BM	
Athlete	Event	Opposition Score	Opposition Score	Opposition Score	Opposition Score	Opposition Score	Rank
A Dawani (BHR); D Tashbulatov (KAZ)	Boys' doubles	N Hardt (DOM); P Sydow (ARU); L (0-6, 1–6)	did not advance				
Thasaporn Naklo (THA); Ali Dawani (BHN)	Mixed Doubles	Nahimana (BDI); Henning (RSA); L (0–6, 1–6)	did not advance				9

== Weightlifting ==
Bahrain was given a quota by the tripartite committee to compete in weightlifting.

Athlete	Event	Snatch		Clean & jerk		Total	Rank
Athlete	Event	Result	Rank	Result	Rank	Total	Rank
Maryam Ahmed	Girls' −48 kg	43	6	62	6	105	6
