= Calum Randle =

English rugby union player

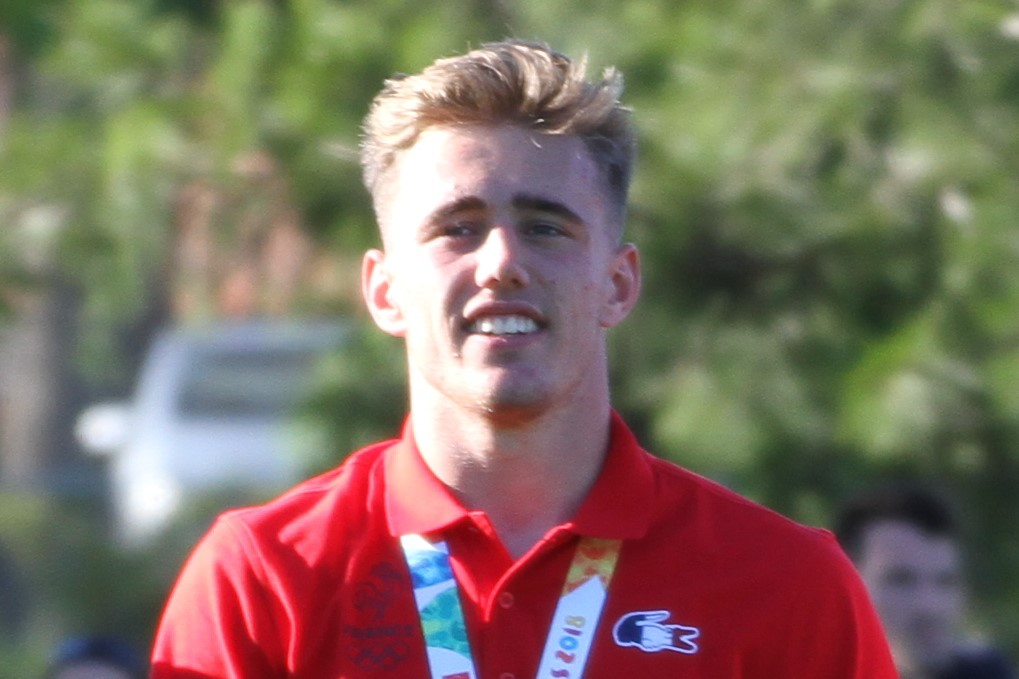
- Born: Calum Randle; 18 January 2000 (age 26) Cheltenham, England
- Height: 1.84 m (6 ft 1/2 in)
- Weight: 92 kg (14 st 7 lb)

Rugby union career
- Position: Wing
- Current team: Montpellier
Senior career
Years	Team	Apps	(Points)
2019–	Montpellier	4	(0)
- Correct as of 12 February 2020
International career
Years	Team	Apps	(Points)
2020	France U20	3	(0)
- Correct as of 12 February 2020
National sevens teams
Years	Team		Comps
2018	France 7s		9
2021-	Great Britain		1

Calum Randle (born 18 January 2000) is a Franco-British rugby union player who plays as winger with Montpellier HR.

== Biography ==
Calum Randle began playing rugby at Gloucester when he was 7. When he was 13, he and his parents moved to Marseillette in France. He made his professional debut with MHR in the European Champions Cup at Gloucester, against his former club. He competed for England at the 2022 Rugby World Cup Sevens in Cape Town.
