= Lea Ma =

American tennis player (born 2001)

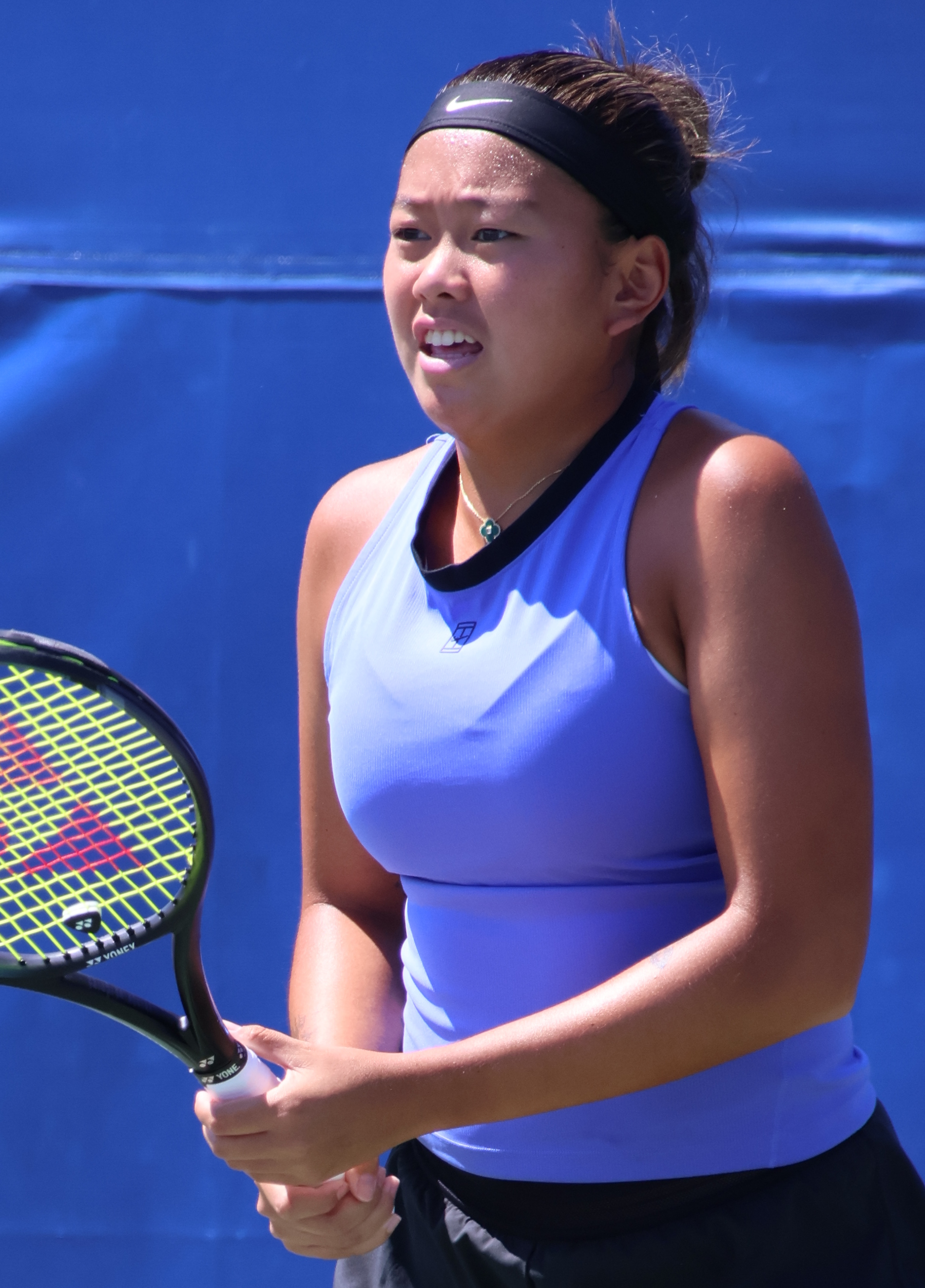
- Ma in 2026
- Country (sports): United States
- Born: February 1, 2001 (age 25) New York City, US
- Height: 5 ft 9 in (175 cm)
- Plays: Right-handed (two-handed backhand)
- College: Georgia Bulldogs (2019–2023)
- Prize money: $46,395

Singles
- Career record: 94–57
- Career titles: 1 ITF
- Highest ranking: No. 328 (October 6, 2025)
- Current ranking: No. 344 (October 13, 2025)

Doubles
- Career record: 3–6
- Career titles: 0
- Highest ranking: No. 1,170 (August 5, 2019)
- Last updated on: October 13, 2025.

Lea Ma (born February 1, 2001) is an American professional tennis player. She played college tennis for the Georgia Bulldogs and was ranked as high as No. 3 in college singles.

== Early life and junior career ==
Ma grew up in Dix Hills, New York. She trained at the USTA Billie Jean King National Tennis Center in New York and the Junior Tennis Champions Center in Maryland before moving to IMG Academy in Florida in the winter of 2017–18. She played on the International Tennis Federation (ITF) Junior Circuit from 2014 to 2019, winning one singles title and four doubles titles, and reached a peak junior ranking of No. 19 in July 2018. At the junior Grand Slam level, she reached the round of 16 in singles at the 2018 Wimbledon Championships and 2018 US Open and the quarterfinals in doubles at the 2019 French Open (partnering Hurricane Tyra Black). She represented the United States at the 2018 Summer Youth Olympics in Buenos Aires.

== College career ==
Ma committed to the University of Georgia in June 2019. She began playing for Georgia in the fall of 2019, but the spring season was interrupted by the COVID-19 pandemic. As a sophomore in 2020–21, she went 17–5 in singles, playing mostly in the team's No. 2 spot, and was ranked No. 30 nationally at the end of the season. She helped Georgia win the Southeastern Conference (SEC) regular season title and the SEC Championship, receiving All-SEC first team honors and being named SEC Newcomer of the Year. She finished the next season, 2021–22, with a singles record of 16–8 and a ranking of No. 38, again being named to the All-SEC first team.

In October 2022, Ma won the Intercollegiate Tennis Association (ITA) Southeast Regionals title. She handed No. 1 college player Fiona Crawley her first defeat of the season in Georgia's loss to North Carolina in February 2023. She went 32–8 in singles as a senior, finishing her college career with a national ranking of No. 3, and helped Georgia win the SEC Tournament and reach the NCAA Championships semifinals. She was named to the All-SEC first team and nominated for the Honda Sports Award for tennis.

== Professional career ==
After graduation, Ma began regularly playing on the ITF Women's World Tennis Tour in mid-2023. She received five ITF tournament wildcards as one of the first recipients of the ITF/WTA College Accelerator Program in September 2023.

== ITF Circuit finals ==
=== Singles: 3 (2 titles, 1 runner-up) ===
Legend W35 tournaments (2–1)	Finals by surface Hard (2–1)

Result	W–L	Date	Tournament	Tier	Surface	Opponent	Score
Win	1–0	Sep 2024	ITF Redding, United States	W35	Hard	(United States) Maria Mateas	6–3, 6–2
Loss	1–1	Oct 2025	ITF Redding, United States	W35	Hard	(Italy) Francesca Pace	6–1, 2–6, 4–6
Win	2–1	Jun 2026	ITF Decatur, United States	W35	Hard	(United States) Madison Brengle	6–3, 7–6^{(3)}
