= Damien Wenger =

Swiss tennis player

- Country (sports): Switzerland
- Born: 17 March 2000 (age 25) Biel/Bienne, Switzerland
- Height: 1.73 m (5 ft 8 in)
- Plays: Right-handed (two-handed backhand)
- Prize money: $102,264

Singles
- Career record: 0–0 (at ATP Tour level, Grand Slam level, and in Davis Cup)
- Career titles: 5 ITF
- Highest ranking: No. 363 (22 May 2023)
- Current ranking: No. 401 (20 May 2024)

Doubles
- Career record: 0–0 (at ATP Tour level, Grand Slam level, and in Davis Cup)
- Career titles: 13 ITF
- Highest ranking: No. 235 (15 April 2024)
- Current ranking: No. 249 (20 May 2024)
- Last updated on: 20 May 2024.

Damien Wenger (born 17 March 2000) is a Swiss tennis player. He has a career high ATP singles ranking of world No. 363 achieved on 22 May 2023 and a doubles ranking of No. 235 achieved on 15 April 2024.

== Career ==
Wenger made his ATP main draw debut at the 2024 Geneva Open after receiving a wildcard into the doubles main draw with Luca Margaroli.
