= Swimming at the 2018 Summer Youth Olympics – Boys' 200 metre freestyle =

Boys' 200 metre freestyle at the 2018 Summer Youth Olympics
- Venue: Natatorium
- Dates: 8 October
- Competitors: 36 from 32 nations
- Winning time: 1:47.73

Medalists
gold medal	Kristóf Milák	Hungary
silver medal	Robin Hanson	Sweden
bronze medal	Denis Loktev	Israel

The boys' 200 metre freestyle event at the 2018 Summer Youth Olympics took place on 8 October at the Natatorium in Buenos Aires, Argentina.

== Results ==
=== Heats ===
The heats were started at 10:57.

Rank	Heat	Lane	Name	Nationality	Time	Notes
1	4	5	Keisuke Yoshida	Japan	1:48.97	Q
2	4	3	Murilo Sartori	Brazil	1:49.02	Q
3	5	4	Kristóf Milák	Hungary	1:49.15	Q
4	5	3	Jakub Kraska	Poland	1:49.17	Q
5	4	4	Denis Loktev	Israel	1:49.20	Q
6	3	4	Robin Hanson	Sweden	1:49.86	Q
7	5	7	Lee Yoo-yeon	South Korea	1:50.08	Q
8	3	5	Antonio Djakovic	Switzerland	1:50.30	Q
9	5	6	Mohamed Aziz Ghaffari	Tunisia	1:50.74	
10	5	5	Lucas Peixoto	Brazil	1:50.76	
11	2	3	Ahmed Hafnaoui	Tunisia	1:50.86	
12	4	8	Hong Jinquan	China	1:51.22	
13	4	1	Efe Turan	Turkey	1:51.25	
14	3	3	Rafael Miroslaw	Germany	1:51.59	
15	4	6	Marco De Tullio	Italy	1:51.62	
16	2	1	Marcos Gil	Spain	1:51.83	
17	2	5	Dušan Babić	Serbia	1:51.91	
18	2	6	Adam Hlobeň	Czech Republic	1:51.92	
19	5	8	Ashton Brinkworth	Australia	1:51.94	
20	3	2	Kanstantsin Kurachkin	Belarus	1:52.06	
21	5	2	Zac Reid	New Zealand	1:52.33	
22	3	7	Ákos Kalmár	Hungary	1:52.54	
23	5	1	Yordan Yanchev	Bulgaria	1:52.80	
24	2	2	Will Barao	United States	1:53.18	
25	2	7	James Freeman	Botswana	1:54.14	
26	3	8	Jarod Arroyo	Puerto Rico	1:54.39	
27	4	7	Juan Morales	Colombia	1:55.25	
28	2	4	Federico Burdisso	Italy	1:55.40	
29	3	6	Ognjen Marić	Croatia	1:55.44	
30	1	4	Bob Sauber	Luxembourg	1:55.50	
31	1	5	Filipe Santo	Portugal	1:55.81	
32	2	8	Guillermo Cruz	Mexico	1:55.88	
33	3	1	Wang Kuan-hung	Chinese Taipei	1:59.54	
34	1	3	Noel Keane	Palau	2:00.77	
35	4	2	Nguyễn Huy Hoàng	Vietnam	2:00.98	
36	1	6	Daniel Scott	Guyana	2:05.43	

=== Final ===
The final was held at 18:09.

Rank	Lane	Name	Nationality	Time	Notes
1st place, gold medalist(s)	3	Kristóf Milák	Hungary	1:47.73	
2nd place, silver medalist(s)	7	Robin Hanson	Sweden	1:48.14	
3rd place, bronze medalist(s)	2	Denis Loktev	Israel	1:48.53	
4	6	Jakub Kraska	Poland	1:48.65	
5	4	Keisuke Yoshida	Japan	1:48.75	
6	5	Murilo Sartori	Brazil	1:49.22	
7	8	Antonio Djakovic	Switzerland	1:49.74	
8	1	Lee Yoo-yeon	South Korea	1:50.39	
