= Zambia at the 2018 Summer Youth Olympics =

- IOC code: ZAM
- NOC: National Olympic Committee of Zambia
- Website: http://www.nocz.co.zm/index.php

in Buenos Aires, Argentina 6 – 18 October 2018
- Competitors: 14 in 5 sports
- Medals Ranked 76th: Gold 0 Silver 1 Bronze 1 Total 2

Summer Youth Olympics appearances
- 2010; 2014; 2018

Zambia is scheduled to participate at the 2018 Summer Youth Olympics in Buenos Aires, Argentina from 6 October to 18 October 2018.

== Equestrian ==
Zambia qualified a rider based on its ranking in the FEI World Jumping Challenge Rankings.

- Individual Jumping - 1 athlete

== Field hockey ==
=== Preliminary round ===
| Pos | Team | Pld | W | D | L | GF | GA | GD | Pts | Qualification |
|---|---|---|---|---|---|---|---|---|---|---|
| 1 | Argentina (H) | 5 | 5 | 0 | 0 | 36 | 6 | +30 | 15 | Quarterfinals |
| 2 | Malaysia | 5 | 4 | 0 | 1 | 31 | 11 | +20 | 12 | Quarterfinals |
| 3 | Poland | 5 | 2 | 0 | 3 | 29 | 17 | +12 | 6 | Quarterfinals |
| 4 | Zambia | 5 | 2 | 0 | 3 | 29 | 23 | +6 | 6 | Quarterfinals |
| 5 | Mexico | 5 | 2 | 0 | 3 | 19 | 20 | −1 | 6 | 9th place game |
| 6 | Vanuatu | 5 | 0 | 0 | 5 | 5 | 72 | −67 | 0 | 11th place game |

Source: FIH
Rules for classification: 1) Points; 2) Goal difference; 3) Goals scored; 4) Head-to-head result.
(H) Hosts

7 October 2018
13:15

| Argentina | 6–2 | Zambia |
|---|---|---|
| Ibarra 1', 6', 9'; Marcucci 4', 18'; Sarto 8' | Report | Bwali 7'; Siwale 10' |

Umpires:
Peter Kabaso (KEN)
James Unkles (AUS)

8 October 2018
16:15

| Zambia | 4–3 | Poland |
|---|---|---|
| Mubanga 4', 13'; Siwale 11'; Bwali 18' | Report | Jarzyński 1'; Nowkowski 3'; E. Bembenek 16' |

Umpires:
Napoleon Chanamthabam (IND)
James Unkles (AUS)

9 October 2018
11:45

| Zambia | 2–7 | Malaysia |
|---|---|---|
| Mulenga 2', 3' | Report | Rosdi 3'; Anuar 6', 10', 12', 20'; Azahar 9'; Mat 13' |

Umpires:
Peter Kabaso (KEN)
James Unkles (AUS)

10 October 2018
14:45

| Mexico | 6–4 | Zambia |
|---|---|---|
| Hernández 2'; Estrada 6'; Palma 7'; Villegas 10', 13'; Sosa 15' | Report | Bwali 14', 20'; Mubanga 17', 18' |

Umpires:
James Unkles (AUS)
Napoleon Chanamthabam (IND)

11 October 2018
09:30

| Vanuatu | 1–17 | Zambia |
|---|---|---|
| Lily 20' | Report | Mubanga 2', 4', 11', 11'; Moyo 7', 12', 12', 13', 18', 19'; Bwali 8', 15', 17', 19'; Siwale 9'; Banda 16'; Kapeso 20' |

Umpires:
Nick Saunders (NZL)
Napoleon Chanamthabam (IND)

=== Final round ===
==== Quarterfinals ====
12 October 2018
10:00

| Australia | 4–6 | Zambia |
|---|---|---|
| Murray 5'; Davis 8'; Collins 11'; Carr 17' | Report | Moyo 2', 19'; Bwali 6', 10', 18'; Mulenga 14' |

Umpires:
Napoleon Chanamthabam (IND)
Hristiyan Vasilev (BUL)

==== Semifinals ====
13 October 2018
14:00

| Malaysia | 7–4 | Zambia |
|---|---|---|
| Anuar 1', 9', 20'; Rosdi 4', 7'; Moharam 12'; Mat 13' | Report | Moyo 6', 19'; Bwali 14', 18' |

Umpires:
Nick Saunders (NZL)
Jonathan Altamirano (MEX)

==== Bronze medal game ====
14 October 2018
13:00

| Argentina | 4–0 | Zambia |
|---|---|---|
| Zarate 4', 14'; Sarto 10'; Ibarra 19' | Report |

Umpires:
Peter Kabaso (KEN)
Hideki Kinoshita (JPN)

== Swimming ==
| Athlete | Event | Heat | | Semifinal | | Final | |
| Athlete | Event | Time | Rank | Time | Rank | Time | Rank |
|---|---|---|---|---|---|---|---|
| Mia Ann Phiri | Girls' 50 m freestyle | 28.28 | 36 | did not advance | | | |
| Mia Ann Phiri | Girls' 50 m backstroke | 30.89 | 30 | did not advance | | | |
