= Swimming at the 2018 Summer Youth Olympics – Boys' 800 metre freestyle =

Boys' 800 metre freestyle at the 2018 Summer Youth Olympics
- Venue: Natatorium
- Dates: 11 October
- Competitors: 26 from 22 nations
- Winning time: 7:50.20

Medalists
gold medal	Nguyễn Huy Hoàng	Vietnam
silver medal	Keisuke Yoshida	Japan
bronze medal	Marco De Tullio	Italy

The boys' 800 metre freestyle event at the 2018 Summer Youth Olympics took place on 11 October at the Natatorium in Buenos Aires, Argentina.

== Results ==
The heats were started at 10:00 and 18:00.

Rank	Heat	Lane	Name	Nationality	Time	Notes
1st place, gold medalist(s)	4	6	Nguyễn Huy Hoàng	Vietnam	7:50.20	NR
2nd place, silver medalist(s)	4	8	Keisuke Yoshida	Japan	7:53.85	
3rd place, bronze medalist(s)	4	1	Marco De Tullio	Italy	7:55.81	
4	4	4	Ákos Kalmár	Hungary	7:56.43	
5	4	5	Paul Beaugrand	France	8:01.93	
6	4	3	Johannes Calloni	Italy	8:03.30	
7	2	3	Ahmed Hafnaoui	Tunisia	8:04.43	
8	4	2	Zac Reid	New Zealand	8:05.27	
9	3	7	José Lopes	Portugal	8:09.43	
10	4	7	Ferran Julià	Spain	8:09.92	
11	3	3	Bartłomiej Koziejko	Poland	8:09.97	
12	3	2	Aaron Schmidt	Germany	8:11.73	
13	3	6	Tommy-Lee Camblong	France	8:11.82	
14	3	4	Marcos Gil	Spain	8:12.93	
15	2	4	Yordan Yanchev	Bulgaria	8:13.49	
16	3	5	Andreas Georgakopoulos	Greece	8:14.71	
17	3	8	Advait Page	India	8:16.06	
18	2	6	Boris Lačanski	Serbia	8:16.17	
19	2	7	Kanstantsin Kurachkin	Belarus	8:17.62	
20	2	5	James Freeman	Botswana	8:18.64	
21	2	1	Murilo Sartori	Brazil	8:22.27	
22	3	1	Will Barao	United States	8:23.60	
23	2	2	Filipe Santo	Portugal	8:24.48	
24	1	4	Sarith Petchakul	Thailand	8:38.52	
25	1	5	Amadou Ndiaye	Senegal	8:47.04	
26	1	3	Murray MacPherson	Malawi	9:35.82	
