= Athletics at the 2018 Summer Youth Olympics – Boys' 400 metres =

Boys' 400 metres at the III Summer Youth Olympic Games
- Venue: Parque Polideportivo Roca
- Date: 11 October and 14 October 2018
- Competitors: 25 from 25 nations

Medalists
1st place, gold medalist(s)		Luis Avilés; Mexico
2nd place, silver medalist(s)		Kennedy Luchembe; Zambia
3rd place, bronze medalist(s)		Nicholas Ramey; United States

The boys' 400 metres competition at the 2018 Summer Youth Olympics was held on 11 and 14 October, at the Parque Polideportivo Roca.

== Schedule ==
All times are in local time (UTC-3).

Date	Time	Round
Thursday, 11 October 2018	17:20	Stage 1
Sunday, 14 October 2018	16:10	Stage 2

== Results ==
=== Stage 1 ===
Rank	Heat	Lane	Athlete	Nation	Result	Notes
1	2	2	Luis Avilés	Mexico	47.45	QH4
2	4	2	Nicholas Ramey	United States	47.60	QH4
3	4	8	Ilyas Çanakçi	Turkey	47.96	QH4
4	1	7	Kennedy Luchembe	Zambia	47.98	QH4
5	4	7	Dilan Bogoda	Sri Lanka	48.52	QH4, PB
6	3	7	Lorenzo Benati	Italy	48.58	QH4
7	1	4	Yefim Tarassov	Kazakhstan	48.93	QH4, PB
8	1	2	Solomon Diafo	Ghana	49.08	QH4
9	3	4	Bernat Erta	Spain	49.18	QH3
10	2	7	Keegan Bell	Australia	49.58	QH3
11	1	3	Junior Rouse	Saint Kitts and Nevis	50.33	QH3
12	2	5	Douglas Hernandes Mendes da Silva	Brazil	50.39	QH3
13	3	5	Gnanzou Desire Kodjo	Ivory Coast	50.47	QH3
14	1	6	Wang Yu-hsuan	Chinese Taipei	50.82	QH3
15	3	2	Raymond Oriakhi	Bahamas	51.01	QH2
16	4	4	Evaldo Whitehorne	Jamaica	51.55	QH2
17	3	3	Potchara Petchkaew	Thailand	51.81	QH2
18	3	6	Bernard Olesitse	Botswana	52.04	QH2
19	4	5	Dalitso Gunde	Malawi	53.88	QH2
20	2	8	Christel Rakotomalala	Madagascar	54.31	QH2
21	1	5	Ludovic Ouceni	France	58.15	QH1
	4	6	Clevonte Lodge-Bean	Bermuda	DNF	QH1
	2	6	Malik John	British Virgin Islands	DQ	R 163.3a QH1
	2	4	Jared Sylvester	Grenada	DQ	R 163.3a QH1
	4	3	Yusuf Anan	Bahrain	DQ	R 163.3a QH1
	2	3	Berat Mustafa	Macedonia	DNS	QH1

=== Stage 2 ===
Rank	Heat	Lane	Athlete	Nation	Result	Notes
1	4	3	Kennedy Luchembe	Zambia	46.36	
2	4	6	Luis Avilés	Mexico	46.78	
3	4	4	Nicholas Ramey	United States	47.27	
4	4	5	Ilyas Çanakçi	Turkey	47.82	
5	4	7	Lorenzo Benati	Italy	48.00	
6	3	4	Bernat Erta	Spain	48.13	
7	4	2	Solomon Diafo	Ghana	48.47	
8	3	6	Douglas Hernandes Mendes da Silva	Brazil	48.65	
9	4	8	Dilan Bogoda	Sri Lanka	48.81	
10	2	4	Bernard Olesitse	Botswana	49.04	
11	3	5	Keegan Bell	Australia	49.05	
12	4	1	Yefim Tarassov	Kazakhstan	49.88	
13	2	3	Raymond Oriakhi	Bahamas	50.01	
14	3	3	Junior Rouse	Saint Kitts and Nevis	50.37	
15	3	7	Wang Yu-hsuan	Chinese Taipei	50.54	
16	2	6	Evaldo Whitehorne	Jamaica	50.93	
17	3	8	Gnanzou Desire Kodjo	Ivory Coast	51.11	
18	2	5	Potchara Petchkaew	Thailand	51.19	
19	1	7	Yusuf Anan	Bahrain	52.37	PB
20	2	7	Christel Rakotomalala	Madagascar	52.88	
	1	4	Malik John	British Virgin Islands	DQ	R 163.3a
	1	5	Jared Sylvester	Grenada	DQ	R 163.3a
	2	8	Dalitso Gunde	Malawi	DQ	R 163.3a
	1	6	Ludovic Ouceni	France	DNS	
	1	3	Clevonte Lodge-Bean	Bermuda	DNS	
	1	8	Berat Mustafa	Macedonia	DNS	

=== Final placing ===
Rank	Athlete	Nation	Stage 1	Stage 2	Total
1st place, gold medalist(s)	Luis Avilés	Mexico	47.45	46.78	1:34.23
2nd place, silver medalist(s)	Kennedy Luchembe	Zambia	47.98	46.36	1:34.34
3rd place, bronze medalist(s)	Nicholas Ramey	United States	47.60	47.27	1:34.87
4	Ilyas Çanakçi	Turkey	47.96	47.82	1:35.78
5	Lorenzo Benati	Italy	48.58	48.00	1:36.58
6	Bernat Erta	Spain	49.18	48.13	1:37.31
7	Dilan Bogoda	Sri Lanka	48.52	48.81	1:37.33
8	Solomon Diafo	Ghana	49.08	48.47	1:37.55
9	Keegan Bell	Australia	49.58	49.05	1:38.63
10	Yefim Tarassov	Kazakhstan	48.93	49.88	1:38.81
11	Douglas Hernandes Mendes da Silva	Brazil	50.39	48.65	1:39.04
12	Junior Rouse	Saint Kitts and Nevis	50.33	50.37	1:40.70
13	Raymond Oriakhi	Bahamas	51.01	50.01	1:41.02
14	Bernard Olesitse	Botswana	52.04	49.04	1:41.08
15	Wang Yu-hsuan	Chinese Taipei	50.82	50.54	1:41.36
16	Gnanzou Desire Kodjo	Ivory Coast	50.47	51.11	1:41.58
17	Evaldo Whitehorne	Jamaica	51.55	50.93	1:42.48
18	Potchara Petchkaew	Thailand	51.81	51.19	1:43.00
19	Christel Rakotomalala	Madagascar	54.31	52.88	1:47.19
	Yusuf Anan	Bahrain	DQ	52.37	
	Dalitso Gunde	Malawi	53.88	DQ	
	Ludovic Ouceni	France	58.15	DNS	
	Malik John	British Virgin Islands	DQ	DQ	
	Jared Sylvester	Grenada	DQ	DQ	
	Clevonte Lodge-Bean	Bermuda	DNF	DNS	
	Berat Mustafa	Macedonia	DNS	DNS	
