= Swimming at the 2018 Summer Youth Olympics – Boys' 400 metre freestyle =

Boys' 400 metre freestyle at the 2018 Summer Youth Olympics
- Venue: Natatorium
- Dates: 7 October
- Competitors: 32 from 28 nations
- Winning time: 3:48.08

Medalists
gold medal	Kristóf Milák	Hungary
silver medal	Marco De Tullio	Italy
bronze medal	Keisuke Yoshida	Japan

The boys' 400 metre freestyle event at the 2018 Summer Youth Olympics took place on 7 October at the Natatorium in Buenos Aires, Argentina.

== Results ==
=== Heats ===
The heats were started at 10:00.

Rank	Heat	Lane	Name	Nationality	Time	Notes
1	4	4	Keisuke Yoshida	Japan	3:51.68	Q
2	4	5	Ákos Kalmár	Hungary	3:51.73	Q
3	3	4	Kristóf Milák	Hungary	3:51.99	Q
4	4	2	Denis Loktev	Israel	3:52.04	Q
5	2	8	Ahmed Hafnaoui	Tunisia	3:52.06	Q
6	4	6	Marco De Tullio	Italy	3:52.31	Q
7	3	5	Nguyễn Huy Hoàng	Vietnam	3:52.40	Q
8	3	6	Antonio Djakovic	Switzerland	3:52.42	Q
9	4	3	Zac Reid	New Zealand	3:52.79	
10	3	3	Johannes Calloni	Italy	3:53.15	
11	2	2	Robin Hanson	Sweden	3:53.71	
12	3	2	Mohamed Aziz Ghaffari	Tunisia	3:54.02	
13	3	1	Marcos Gil	Spain	3:54.22	
14	2	1	Murilo Sartori	Brazil	3:55.76	
15	3	7	José Lopes	Portugal	3:56.10	
16	2	5	Andreas Georgakopoulos	Greece	3:56.37	
17	4	7	Yordan Yanchev	Bulgaria	3:56.90	
18	1	6	Efe Turan	Turkey	3:56.92	
19	4	8	Aaron Schmidt	Germany	3:57.03	
20	2	6	James Freeman	Botswana	3:57.37	
21	1	4	Kanstantsin Kurachkin	Belarus	3:57.99	
22	3	8	Ferran Julià	Spain	3:58.11	
23	2	5	Hong Jinquan	China	3:58.93	
24	1	1	Bartłomiej Koziejko	Poland	3:59.08	
25	1	5	Adam Hlobeň	Czech Republic	3:59.11	
26	2	3	Will Barao	United States	4:00.43	
27	1	2	Boris Lačanski	Serbia	4:02.06	
28	2	7	Paul Beaugrand	France	4:02.83	
29	1	3	Jarod Arroyo	Puerto Rico	4:02.94	
30	1	7	Arvin Chahal	Malaysia	4:06.11	
31	4	1	Amadou Ndiaye	Senegal	4:17.36	
32	1	8	Samil Nur Haziq	Brunei	4:33.47	

=== Final ===
The final was held at 18:00.

Rank	Lane	Name	Nationality	Time	Notes
1st place, gold medalist(s)	3	Kristóf Milák	Hungary	3:48.08	
2nd place, silver medalist(s)	7	Marco De Tullio	Italy	3:48.55	
3rd place, bronze medalist(s)	4	Keisuke Yoshida	Japan	3:48.68	
4	1	Nguyễn Huy Hoàng	Vietnam	3:48.85	
5	5	Ákos Kalmár	Hungary	3:51.56	
6	6	Denis Loktev	Israel	3:52.12	
7	8	Antonio Djakovic	Switzerland	3:53.74	
8	2	Ahmed Hafnaoui	Tunisia	3:55.94	

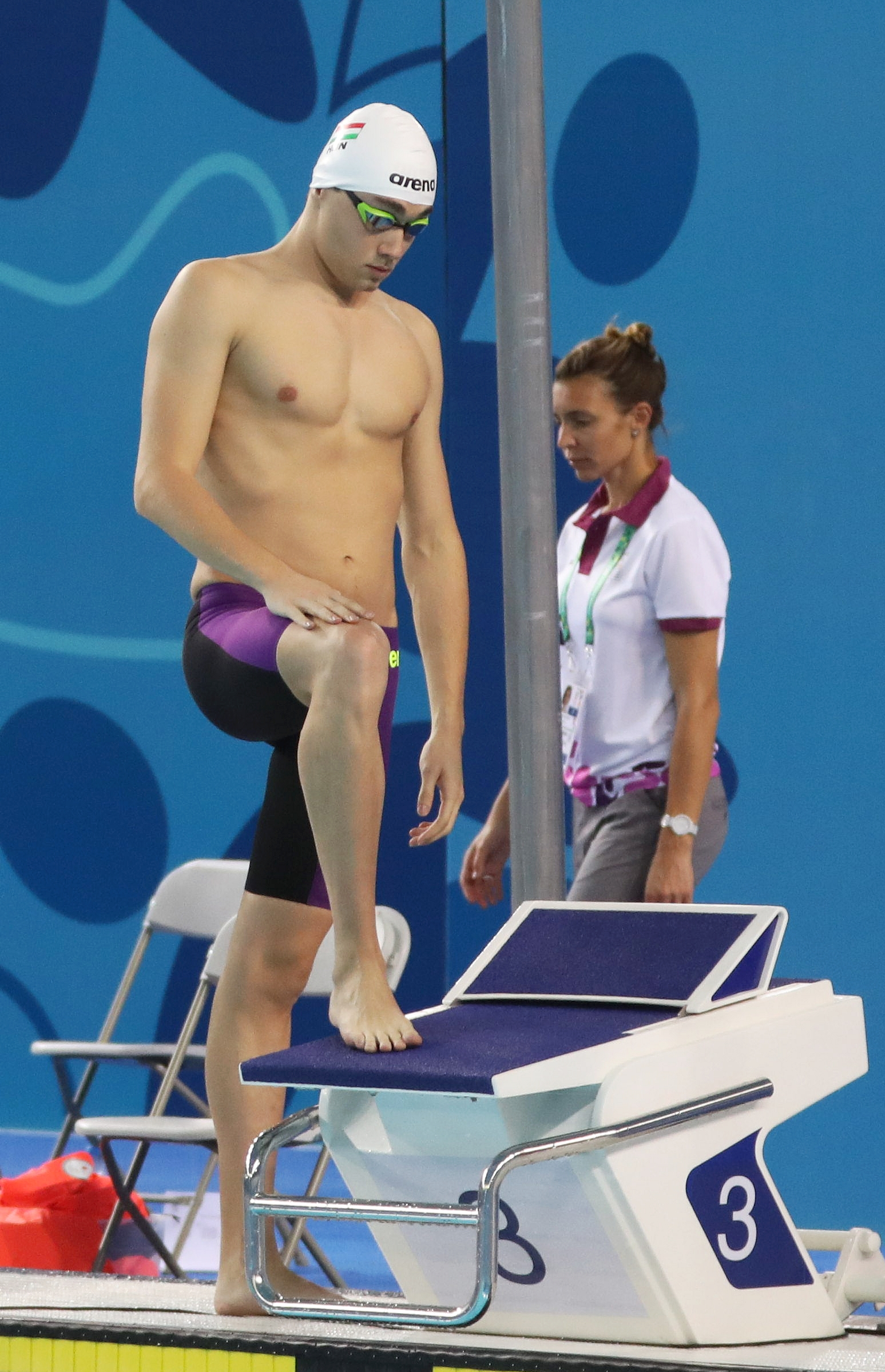
Kristóf Milák

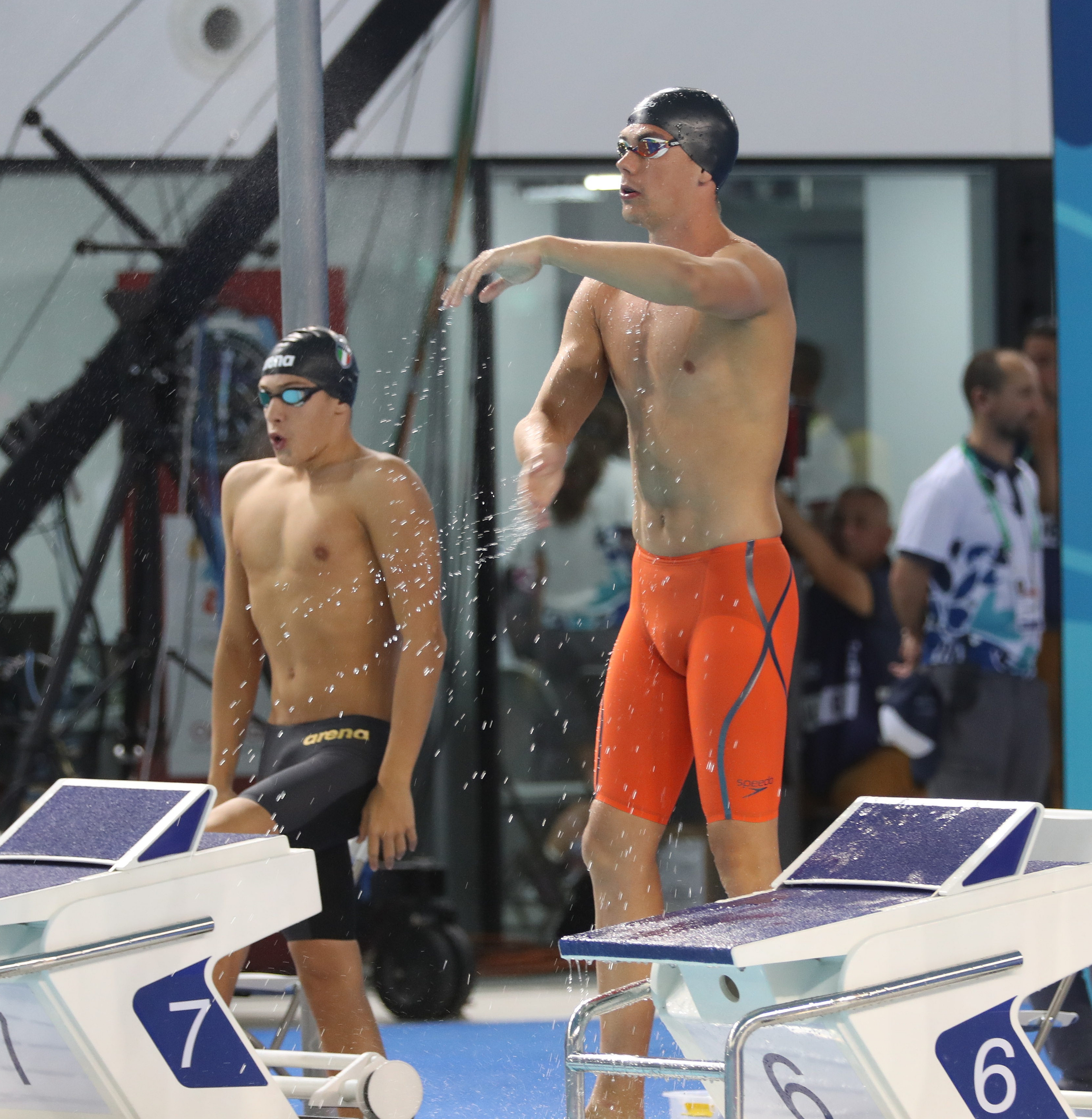
Marco De Tullio, and Denis Loktev

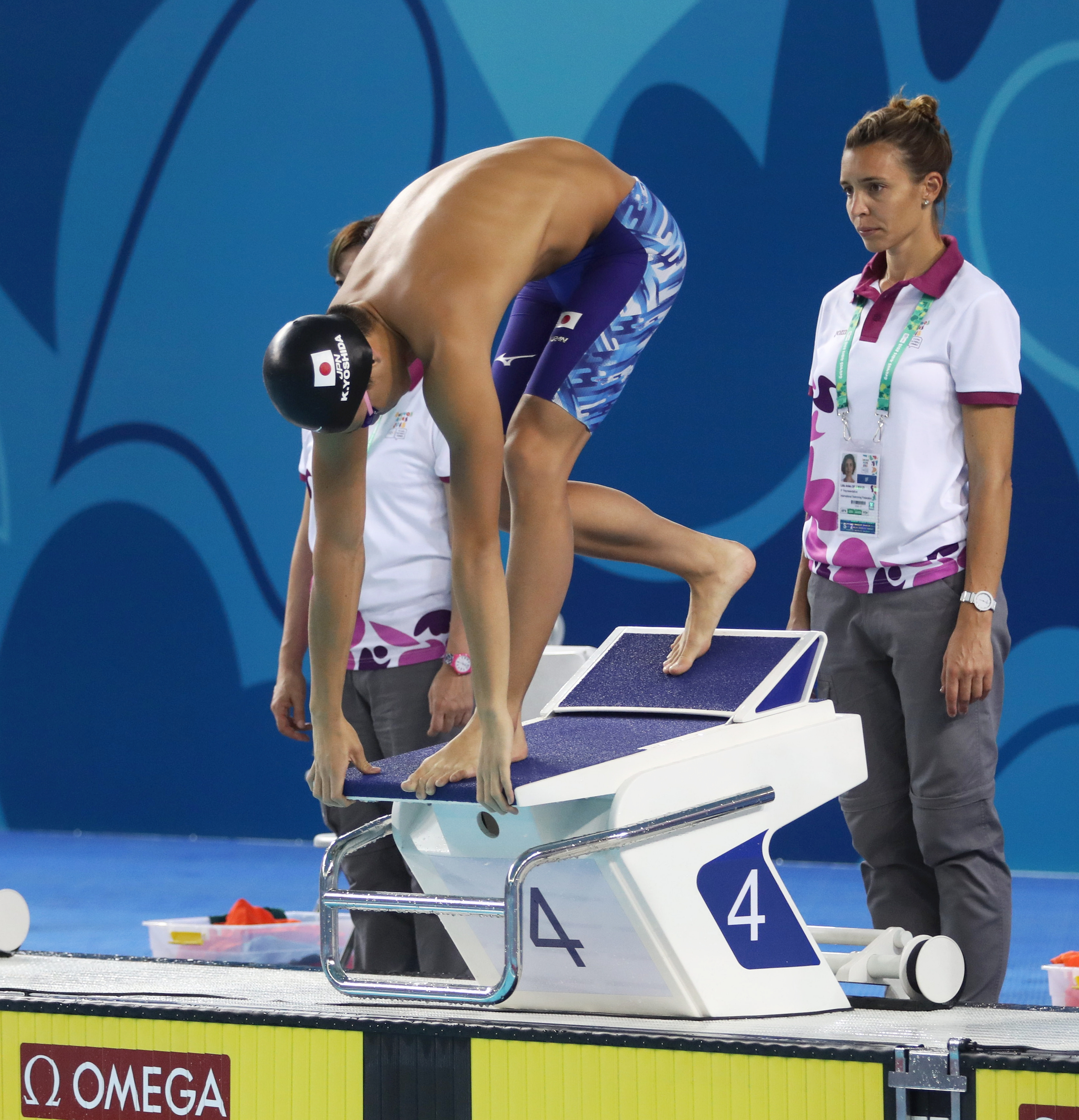
Keisuke Yoshida before the start of the final

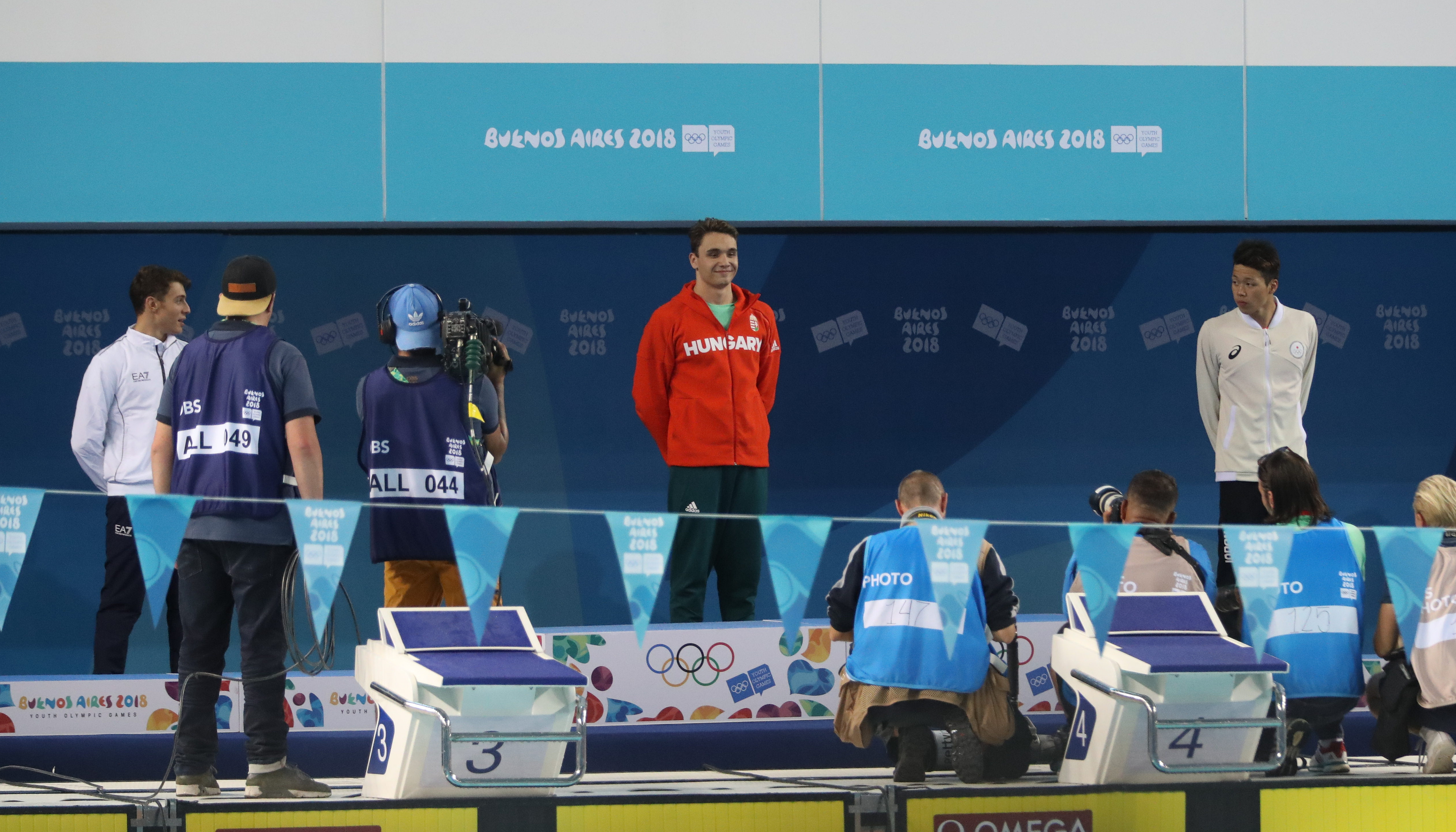
Victory ceremony

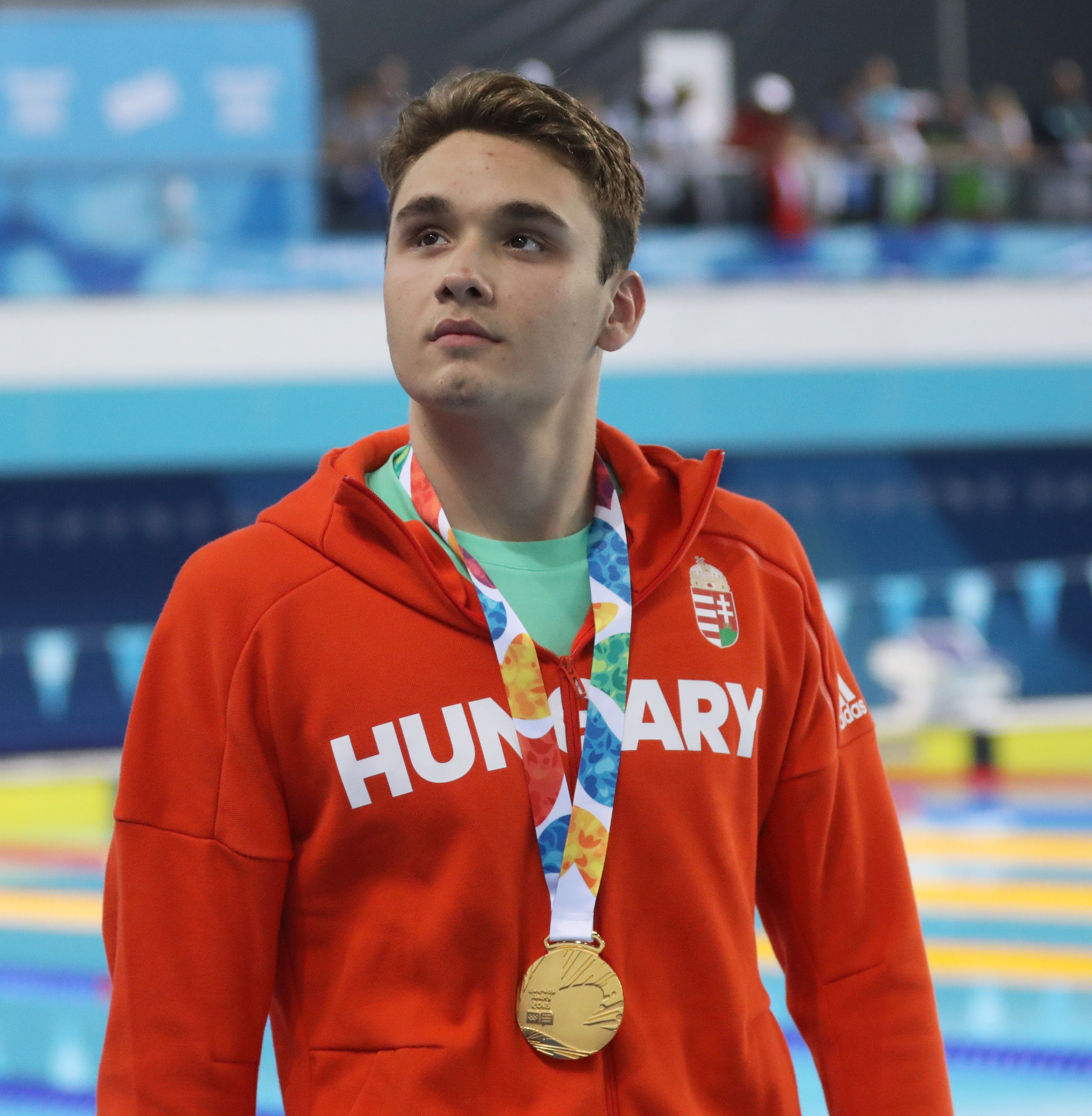
Kristóf Milák with the gold medal
