= Athletics at the 2018 Summer Youth Olympics – Boys' discus throw =

Boys' discus throw at the III Summer Youth Olympic Games
- Venue: Parque Polideportivo Roca
- Date: 11 October and 14 October 2018
- Competitors: 15 from 15 nations

Medalists
1st place, gold medalist(s)		Connor Bell	New Zealand
2nd place, silver medalist(s)		Jorge Luis Contreras	Puerto Rico
3rd place, bronze medalist(s)		Gracjan Kozak	Poland

The boys' discus throw competition at the 2018 Summer Youth Olympics was held on 11 and 14 October, at the Parque Polideportivo Roca.

== Schedule ==
All times are in local time (UTC-3).

Date	Time	Round
Thursday, 11 October 2018	16:15	Stage 1
Sunday, 14 October 2018	14:10	Stage 2

== Results ==
=== Stage 1 ===
Rank	Athlete	Nation	1	2	3	4	Result	Notes
1	Connor Bell	New Zealand	64.89	x	66.84	65.31	66.84	
2	Vitor Motin	Brazil	x	56.67	x	57.30	57.30	
3	Jorge Luis Contreras	Puerto Rico	55.99	x	55.53	49.51	55.99	
4	Gracjan Kozak	Poland	54.85	55.40	53.92	53.88	55.40	
5	Lázaro Bonora	Argentina	55.01	53.65	52.00	53.09	55.01	
6	Valdimar Hjalti Erlendsson	Iceland	x	x	50.38	54.46	54.46	SB
7	Mohammadreza Rahmanifar	Iran	x	x	54.34	x	54.34	
8	Francois Prinsloo	South Africa	x	x	54.07	x	54.07	
9	Roman Khartanovich	Belarus	x	x	52.22	52.78	52.78	
10	Ahmad Al-Haj	Qatar	51.39	x	x	x	51.39	
11	Enrico Saccomano	Italy	48.33	x	x	51.32	51.32	
12	Mark Peringer	Hungary	49.37	x	41.30	x	49.37	
13	Aslan Kagan Kalintas	Turkey	x	x	x	48.78	48.78	
14	Yasiel Sotero	Spain	47.69	x	x	x	47.69	
	Matas Makaravičius	Lithuania	x	x	x	x	NM	

=== Stage 2 ===
Rank	Athlete	Nation	1	2	3	4	Result	Notes
1	Connor Bell	New Zealand	66.24	x	x	64.29	66.24	
2	Gracjan Kozak	Poland	55.66	59.52	56.47	x	59.52	PB
3	Enrico Saccomano	Italy	54.48	58.36	59.49	55.32	59.49	
4	Jorge Luis Contreras	Puerto Rico	59.07	x	58.29	x	59.07	
5	Mohammadreza Rahmanifar	Iran	56.74	56.14	58.92	49.16	58.92	
6	Valdimar Hjalti Erlendsson	Iceland	54.81	57.46	x	x	57.46	PB
7	Roman Khartanovich	Belarus	x	57.27	54.97	56.59	57.27	
8	Francois Prinsloo	South Africa	x	x	56.63	x	56.63	
9	Lázaro Bonora	Argentina	52.39	x	56.36	x	56.36	
10	Vitor Motin	Brazil	x	49.94	54.17	54.78	54.78	
11	Ahmad Al-Haj	Qatar	x	x	x	53.78	53.78	
12	Aslan Kagan Kalintas	Turkey	52.78	x	x	51.44	52.78	
13	Mark Peringer	Hungary	44.52	48.14	x	50.54	50.54	
	Matas Makaravičius	Lithuania	x	x	x	x	NM	
	Yasiel Sotero	Spain	x	x	x	x	NM	

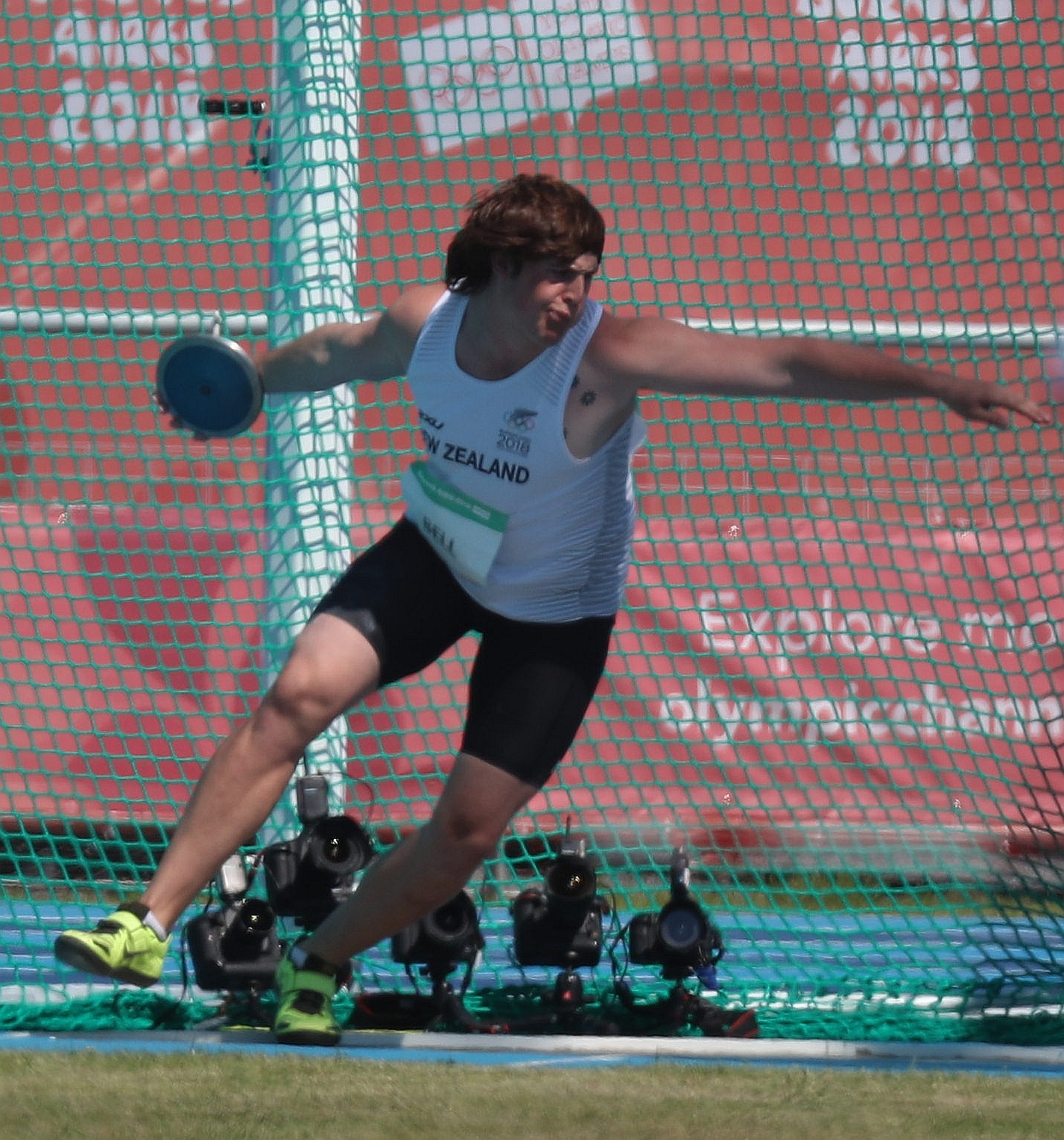
Connor Bell

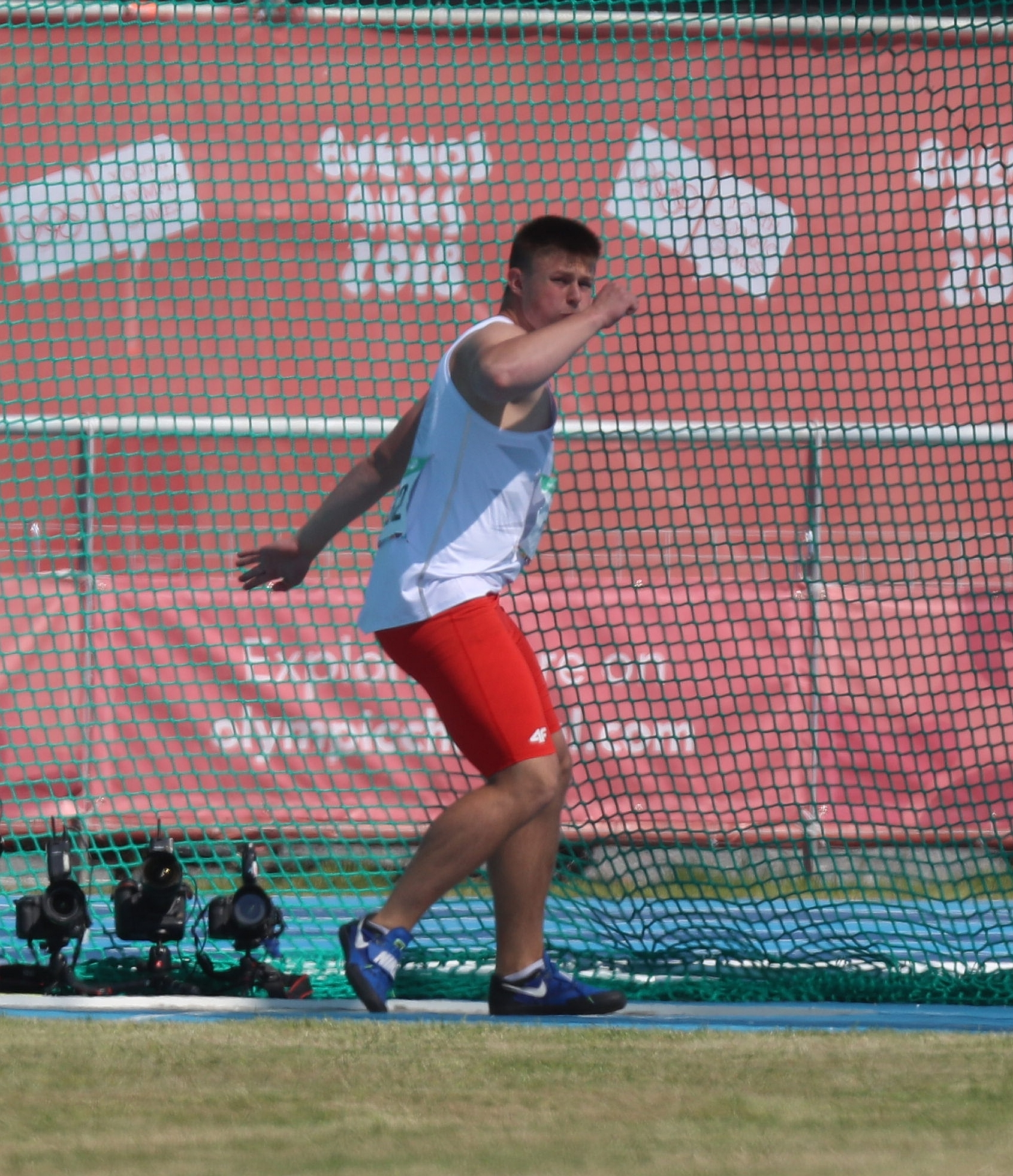
Gracjan Kozak

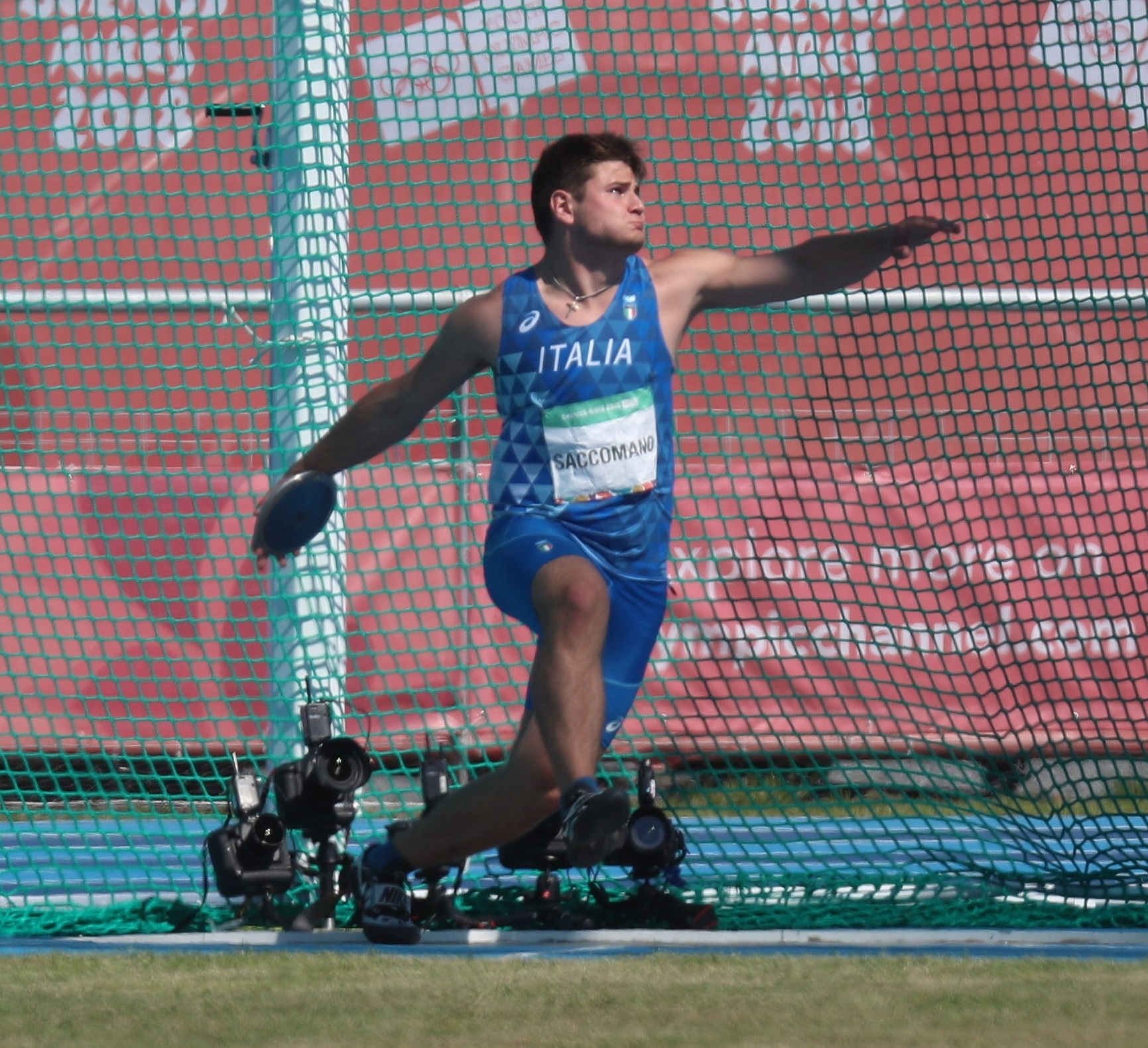
Enrico Saccomano

=== Final placing ===
Rank	Athlete	Nation	Stage 1	Stage 2	Total
1st place, gold medalist(s)	Connor Bell	New Zealand	66.84	66.24	133.08
2nd place, silver medalist(s)	Jorge Luis Contreras	Puerto Rico	55.99	59.07	115.06
3rd place, bronze medalist(s)	Gracjan Kozak	Poland	55.40	59.52	114.92
4	Mohammadreza Rahmanifar	Iran	54.34	58.92	113.26
5	Vitor Motin	Brazil	57.30	54.78	112.08
6	Valdimar Hjalti Erlendsson	Iceland	54.46	57.46	111.92
7	Lázaro Bonora	Argentina	55.01	56.36	111.37
8	Enrico Saccomano	Italy	51.32	59.49	110.81
9	Francois Prinsloo	South Africa	54.07	56.63	110.70
10	Roman Khartanovich	Belarus	52.78	57.27	110.05
11	Ahmad Al-Haj	Qatar	51.39	53.78	105.17
12	Aslan Kagan Kalintas	Turkey	48.78	52.78	101.56
13	Mark Peringer	Hungary	49.37	50.54	99.91
14	Yasiel Sotero	Spain	47.69	NM	47.69
15	Matas Makaravičius	Lithuania	NM	NM	NM
