= Keisuke Yoshida =

Keisuke Yoshida may refer to:

- Keisuke Yoshida (director) (吉田 恵輔, born 1975), Japanese film director and screenwriter
- Keisuke Yoshida (swimmer) (吉田 啓祐, born 2000), Japanese swimmer
