= Poland at the 2018 Summer Youth Olympics =

- IOC code: POL
- NOC: Polish Olympic Committee
- Website: http://www.olimpijski.pl/

in Buenos Aires, Argentina 6 – 18 October 2018
- Competitors: 71 in 17 sports
- Medals Ranked 70th: Gold 0 Silver 1 Bronze 3 Total 4

Summer Youth Olympics appearances
- 2010; 2014; 2018

Poland participated at the 2018 Summer Youth Olympics in Buenos Aires, Argentina from 6 October to 18 October 2018.

== Medalists ==
Medal	Name	Sport	Event	Date
Silver	Jakub Kraska	Swimming	Boys' 100m Freestyle	11 October
Bronze	Jan Kałusowski	Swimming	Boys' 200m Breaststroke	09 October
Bronze	Jakub Kraska; Jan Kałusowski; Jakub Majerski; Bartłomiej Koziejko	Swimming	Boys' 4 × 100m Medley Relay	09 October
Bronze	Gracjan Kozak	Athletics	Boys' Discus	14 October

== Beach volleyball ==
Poland qualified a girls' team based on their performance at 2017-18 European Youth Continental Cup Final.

- Girls' tournament - 1 team of 2 athletes
- Boys' tournament - 1 team of 2 athletes

Athlete	Event	Group stage				Round of 24	Round of 16	Quarterfinal	Semifinal	Final / BM	Rank
Athlete	Event	Opposition Score	Opposition Score	Opposition Score	Rank	Opposition Score	Opposition Score	Opposition Score	Opposition Score	Opposition Score	Rank
Poznański; Miszczuk	Boys' tournament	Veretiuk–Shekunov (RUS); L 0-2	Lammel–Droguett (CHI); W 2-0	Jeffrey–Joe (NZL); W 2-0	2	N Phichakon–T Phanupong (THA); L 0-2	did not advance				
Gierczynska; Jundziłł	Girls' tournament	J.J. Zeng–Sh. T. Cao (CHN); L 1-2	Juárez–Alvarado (GUA); W 2-0	Niro–Nada (EGY); W 2-0	2	Villar–Churín (ARG); L 0-2	did not advance				

== Boxing ==
Girls

Athlete	Event	Preliminaries	Semifinals	Final / RM	Rank
Athlete	Event	Opposition Result	Opposition Result	Opposition Result	Rank
Natalia Gajewska	-75 kg	Ryabets (KAZ); L 0–5	did not advance		5

== Canoeing ==
Poland qualified one boat based on its performance at the 2018 World Qualification Event.

- Boys' K1 - 1 boat

Athlete	Event	Qualification		Repechage		Quarterfinals	Semifinals	Final / BM	Rank
Athlete	Event	Time	Rank	Time	Rank	Opposition Result	Opposition Result	Opposition Result	Rank
Wojciech Pilarz	K1 sprint	1:42.64	4	Bye		Yakovlev (KAZ); W 1:42.63	Vangeel (BEL); L 1:41.22	Rossi (ARG); L 1:41.11	4
Wojciech Pilarz	K1 slalom	1:17.65	8	1:17.13	4	Bouchardon (FRA); L 1:19.57	did not advance		

== Cycling ==
Poland qualified a boys' and girls' combined team based on its ranking in the Youth Olympic Games Junior Nation Rankings.

- Boys' combined team - 1 team of 2 athletes
- Girls' combined team - 1 team of 2 athletes

== Dancesport ==
Poland qualified one dancer based on its performance at the 2018 World Youth Breaking Championship.

- B-Boys - Axel

== Field hockey ==
- Boys' tournament - 1 team of 9 athletes
- Girls' tournament - 1 team of 9 athletes

=== Boys' tournament ===
==== Preliminary round ====
Pos	Team	Pld	W	D	L	GF	GA	GD	Pts	Qualification
1	Argentina (H)	5	5	0	0	36	6	+30	15	Quarterfinals
2	Malaysia	5	4	0	1	31	11	+20	12	Quarterfinals
3	Poland	5	2	0	3	29	17	+12	6	Quarterfinals
4	Zambia	5	2	0	3	29	23	+6	6	Quarterfinals
5	Mexico	5	2	0	3	19	20	−1	6	9th place game
6	Vanuatu	5	0	0	5	5	72	−67	0	11th place game

Source: FIH
Rules for classification: 1) Points; 2) Goal difference; 3) Goals scored; 4) Head-to-head result.
(H) Hosts

7 October 2018
09:30

Poland	6–3	Mexico
T. Bembenek 5'; Nitka 9', 18'; E. Bembenek 12'; Zabłocki 13'; Jarzyński 17'	Report	Villegas 6', 19'; Estrada 16'

Umpires:
Hideki Kinoshita (JPN)
Napoleon Chanamthabam (IND)

8 October 2018
16:15

Zambia	4–3	Poland
Mubanga 4', 13'; Siwale 11'; Bwali 18'	Report	Jarzyński 1'; Nowkowski 3'; E. Bembenek 16'

Umpires:
Napoleon Chanamthabam (IND)
James Unkles (AUS)

9 October 2018
13:15

Poland	2–5	Argentina
Nitka 4'; Nowkowski 20'	Report	Garrone 3'; Sarto 9', 14'; Marcucci 11'; Ibarra 20'

Umpires:
Peter Kabaso (KEN)
Nick Saunders (NZL)

10 October 2018
15:30

Vanuatu	1–15	Poland
Katmatem 19'	Report	Jarzyński 1', 7'; E. Bembenek 1', 9', 15', 18', 20'; Chumeńczuk 8'; Zabłocki 9', 13', 14'; Nowkowski 10', 15', 16'; T. Bembenek 13'

Umpires:
Peter Kabaso (KEN)
Hristiyan Vasilev (BUL)

11 October 2018
10:15

Poland	3–4	Malaysia
Jarzyński 7'; E. Bembenek 7'; Nowkowski 11'	Report	Anuar 1', 16', 17'; Azahar 3'

Umpires:
Hideki Kinoshita (JPN)
James Unkles (AUS)

==== 5–8th place semifinals ====
13 October 2018
09:00

Bangladesh	4–5	Poland
Sobuj 13', 15', 17'; Mohammad 20'	Report	Nitka 4'; Nowkowski 6'; Jarzyński 9', 14', 18'

Umpires:
Napoleon Chanamthabam (IND)
James Unkles (AUS)

==== Fifth place game ====
14 October 2018
10:30

Poland	4–4	Australia
E. Bembenek 16'; Jarzyński 18'; Nowkowski 20'; T. Bembenek 20'	Report	Carr 4'; Davis 8'; Marais 10'; Collins 14'
Penalties
E. Bembenek (penalty shoot-out missed); Chumeńczuk (penalty shoot-out scored); Jarzyński (penalty shoot-out missed); Chumeńczuk (penalty shoot-out scored)	2–1	(penalty shoot-out scored) Collins; (penalty shoot-out missed) Carr; (penalty shoot-out missed) Murray; (penalty shoot-out missed) Collins

Umpires:
Napoleon Chanamthabam (IND)
Nick Saunders (NZL)

=== Girls' tournament ===
==== Preliminary round ====
Pos	Team	Pld	W	D	L	GF	GA	GD	Pts	Qualification
1	China	5	5	0	0	29	1	+28	15	Quarterfinals
2	Australia	5	2	1	2	23	8	+15	7	Quarterfinals
3	Poland	5	2	1	2	4	14	−10	7	Quarterfinals
4	Namibia	5	1	2	2	9	17	−8	5	Quarterfinals
5	Zimbabwe	5	1	1	3	6	23	−17	4	9th place game
6	Mexico	5	0	3	2	5	13	−8	3	11th place game

Source: FIH
Rules for classification: 1) Points; 2) Goal difference; 3) Goals scored; 4) Head-to-head result.

7 October 2018
17:45

Poland	1–1	Mexico
Balcerzak 17'	Report	Cuevas 7'

Umpires:
Margaux Brand (CAN)
Fatma Mahmoud (EGY)

8 October 2018
12:30

Zimbabwe	1–2	Poland
A. Terblanche 4'	Report	Mazur 5'; Balcerzak 6'

Umpires:
Cynthia Clement (GHA)
Victoria Pazos (PAR)

9 October 2018
15:30

Poland	0–8	Australia
	Report	Schonell 2', 3', 6', 7', 16'; Smith 8'; Sertorio 9', 18'

Umpires:
Victoria Pazos (PAR)
Margaux Brand (CAN)

10 October 2018
11:00

Namibia	0–1	Poland
	Report	Mazur 20'

Umpires:
Victoria Pazos (PAR)
Ayu Zainuddin (MAS)

11 October 2018
17:45

Poland	0–4	China
	Report	Ma 4', 11', 12', 19'

Umpires:
Lize Strydom (RSA)
Ayu Zainuddin (MAS)

==== Quarterfinals ====
12 October 2018
14:00

India	3–0	Poland
Lalremsiami 10'; Tete 14'; Kaur 14'	Report

Umpires:
Lizé Srtydom (RSA)
Chen Jianjun (CHN)

==== Fifth to eighth place classification ====
===== Crossover =====
13 October 2018
12:00

Poland	1–3	Austria
Balcerzak 20'	Report	Klausbruckner 8'; Felber 10'; Herzog 17'

===== Seventh and eighth place =====
14 October 2018
09:30

Namibia	1–3	Poland
Cormack 15'	Report	Balcerzak 5'; Zimmermann 15', 20'

Umpires:
Margaux Brand (CAN)
Cynthia Clement (GHA)

== Fencing ==
Poland qualified two athletes based on its performance at the 2018 Cadet World Championship.

- Boys' Foil - Maciej Bem
- Girls' Foil - Magdalena Lawska

== Modern pentathlon ==
Poland qualified one pentathlete based on its performance at the European Youth Olympic Games Qualifier.

- Boys' Individual - Kamil Kasperczak

== Sailing ==
Poland qualified two boats based on its performance at the Techno 293+ European Qualifier. They later qualified one boat based on its performance at the African and European IKA Twin Tip Racing Qualifiers.

- Boys' Techno 293+ - 1 boat
- Boys' IKA Twin Tip Racing - 1 boat
- Girls' Techno 293+ - 1 boat

== Shooting ==
Poland qualified one sport shooter based on its performance at the 2018 European Championships.

- Girls' 10m Air Rifle - 1 quota

Individual

Athlete	Event	Qualification		Final	
Athlete	Event	Points	Rank	Points	Rank
Wiktoria Zuzanna Bober	Girls' 10 m air rifle	618.3	10	did not advance	

Team

Athletes	Event	Qualification		Round of 16	Quarterfinals	Semifinals	Final / BM	Rank
Athletes	Event	Points	Rank	Opposition Result	Opposition Result	Opposition Result	Opposition Result	Rank
Miljan Dević (MNE); Wiktoria Zuzanna Bober (POL)	Mixed Team 10m Air Rifle	823.5	8 Q	Volkart (ARG); Zolfagharian (IRI); L 9–10	did not advance			12

== Sport climbing ==
Poland qualified one sport climber based on its performance at the 2017 World Youth Sport Climbing Championships.

- Girls' combined - 2 quota (Aleksandra Kałucka & Natalia Kałucka)

Individual

Athlete	Event	Qualification					Final				
Athlete	Event	Speed	Bouldering	Lead	Total	Rank	Speed	Bouldering	Lead	Total	Rank
Aleksandra Kałucka	Girls' combined	1	17	16	272	7	did not advance				
Natalia Kałucka	Girls' combined	2	12	14	336	8	did not advance				

== Taekwondo ==
Athlete	Event	Quarterfinals	Semifinals	Final	
Athlete	Event	Opposition Result	Opposition Result	Opposition Result	Rank
Marcelina Koszel	Girls' +63 kg	Fatima-Ezzahra Aboufaras (MAR); L 4-20	did not advance		
Jakub Sadurski	Boys' +73 kg	Lee Meng-en (TPE); L 2-10	did not advance		

== Tennis ==
Singles

Athlete	Event	Round of 32	Round of 16	Quarterfinals	Semifinals	Final / BM	
Athlete	Event	Opposition Score	Opposition Score	Opposition Score	Opposition Score	Opposition Score	Rank
Daniel Michalski	Boys' singles	D N'tcha (BEN); W (6-4, 6-2)	O Štyler (CZE); W (6-2, 6-0)	H Gaston (FRA); L(4-6, 1-6)	did not advance		
Iga Świątek	Girls' singles	E Molinaro (LUX); W (6-1, 6-4)	J Garland (TPE); W (4-6, 6-3, 6-1)	C Burel (FRA); L(4-6, 2-6)	did not advance		

Doubles

Athletes	Event	Round of 32	Round of 16	Quarterfinals	Semifinals	Final / BM	
Athletes	Event	Opposition Score	Opposition Score	Opposition Score	Opposition Score	Opposition Score	Rank
Filip Cristian Jianu (ROU); Daniel Michalski (POL)	Boys' doubles	—	Mu (CHN) / Tajima (JPN); L (7-6^{5}, 3-6, [4-10])	did not advance			9
K Juvan (SLO); I Świątek (POL)	Girls' doubles	—	E Cocciaretto (ITA); S Zünd (LIE); W (6-0, 6-2)	C Burel (FRA); D Parry (FRA); W (6-0, 6-4)	ML Carlé (ARG); Osorio (COL); W (6-2, 6-2)	Y Naito (JPN); N Sato (JPN); W (6-7, 7-5, 10-4)	1st place, gold medalist(s)
Daniel Michalski; Iga Świątek	Mixed doubles	A Noel (USA); T Boyer (USA); W (6-1, 6-4)	Y Naito (JPN); N Tajima (JPN); L W/O	did not advance			

== Weightlifting ==
Boys

Athlete	Event	Snatch		Clean & Jerk		Total	Rank
Athlete	Event	Result	Rank	Result	Rank	Total	Rank
Jakub Jerzy Zieliński	+85 kg	140	5	173	5	313	5

Girls

Athlete	Event	Snatch		Clean & jerk		Total	Rank
Athlete	Event	Result	Rank	Result	Rank	Total	Rank
Paulina Rutkowska	−63 kg	84	5	103	5	187	5
