= Botswana at the 2018 Summer Youth Olympics =

- IOC code: BOT
- NOC: Botswana National Olympic Committee
- Website: http://www.botswananoc.org/

in Buenos Aires, Argentina 6 – 18 October 2018
- Competitors: 3 in 2 sports
- Medals: Gold 0 Silver 0 Bronze 0 Total 0

Summer Youth Olympics appearances
- 2010; 2014; 2018

Botswana participated at the 2018 Summer Youth Olympics in Buenos Aires, Argentina from 6 October to 18 October 2018.

== Athletics ==
Athlete	Event	Stage 1	Stage 2	Final Placing
Bernard Olesitse	Men's 400m	51.01	50.01	14

== Swimming ==
Boys

Athlete	Event	Heat		Semifinal		Final	
Athlete	Event	Time	Rank	Time	Rank	Time	Rank
James Samuel Freeman	200 m freestyle	1:54.14	25	did not advance			
James Samuel Freeman	400 m freestyle	3:57.37	20	did not advance			
James Samuel Freeman	800 m freestyle	8:18.64	20	did not advance			

Girls

Athlete	Event	Heat		Semifinal		Final	
Athlete	Event	Time	Rank	Time	Rank	Time	Rank
Ruvarashe Tjawada Gondo	50 m breaststroke	37.79	37	did not advance			
Ruvarashe Tjawada Gondo	50 m butterfly	32.16	34	did not advance			
