= Field hockey at the 2018 Summer Youth Olympics – Boys' tournament =

2018 Summer Youth Olympics
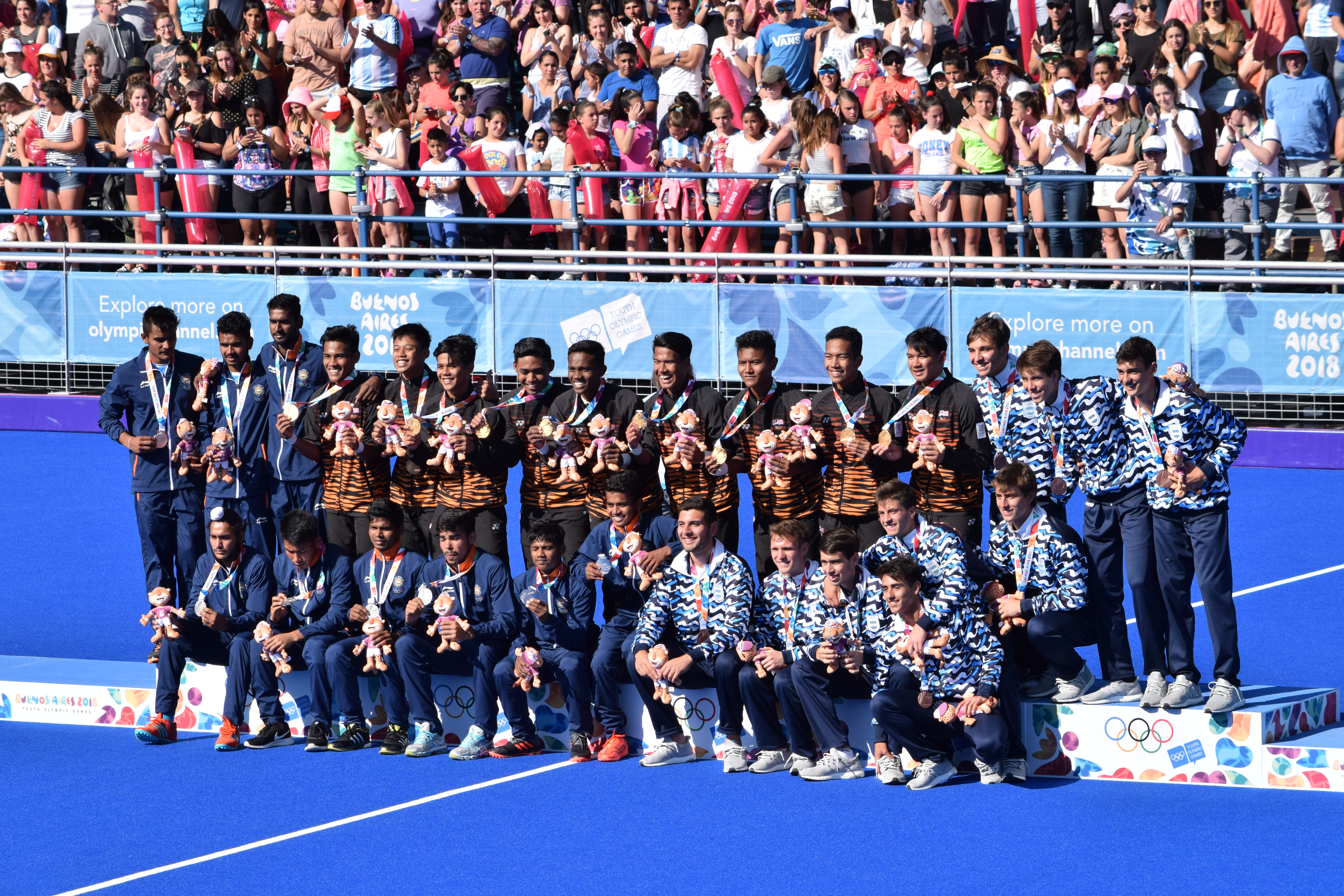

Tournament details
- Host country: Argentina
- City: Buenos Aires
- Dates: 7–14 October
- Teams: 12
- Venue: Parque Polideportivo Roca

Final positions
- Champions: Malaysia (1st title)
- Runner-up: India
- Third place: Argentina

Tournament statistics
- Matches played: 44
- Goals scored: 346 (7.86 per match)
- Top scorer: (Malaysia) Akhimullah Anuar (22 goals)

The boys' tournament at the 2018 Summer Youth Olympics was held at the Parque Polideportivo Roca from 7 to 14 October 2018. Malaysia defeated India to clinch the gold.

== Results ==
All times are Argentina Time (UTC-03:00)

=== Preliminary round ===
==== Pool A ====
Pos	Team	Pld	W	D	L	GF	GA	GD	Pts	Qualification
1	Argentina (H)	5	5	0	0	36	6	+30	15	Quarterfinals
2	Malaysia	5	4	0	1	31	11	+20	12	Quarterfinals
3	Poland	5	2	0	3	29	17	+12	6	Quarterfinals
4	Zambia	5	2	0	3	29	23	+6	6	Quarterfinals
5	Mexico	5	2	0	3	19	20	−1	6	9th place game
6	Vanuatu	5	0	0	5	5	72	−67	0	11th place game

Source: FIH
Rules for classification: 1) Points; 2) Goal difference; 3) Goals scored; 4) Head-to-head result.
(H) Hosts

7 October 2018
09:30

Poland	6–3	Mexico
T. Bembenek 5'; Nitka 9', 18'; E. Bembenek 12'; Zabłocki 13'; Jarzyński 17'	Report	Villegas 6', 19'; Estrada 16'

Umpires:
Hideki Kinoshita (JPN)
Napoleon Chanamthabam (IND)

7 October 2018
10:15

Malaysia	14–0	Vanuatu
Anuar 3', 7', 8', 14', 15', 20', 20'; Azahar 7', 13'; Mat 9'; Moharam 11', 12'; Rosdi 18'; Ishak 18'	Report

Umpires:
Peter Kabaso (KEN)
Nick Saunders (NZL)

7 October 2018
13:15

Argentina	6–2	Zambia
Ibarra 1', 6', 9'; Marcucci 4', 18'; Sarto 8'	Report	Bwali 7'; Siwale 10'

Umpires:
Peter Kabaso (KEN)
James Unkles (AUS)

8 October 2018
16:15

Zambia	4–3	Poland
Mubanga 4', 13'; Siwale 11'; Bwali 18'	Report	Jarzyński 1'; Nowakowski 3'; E. Bembenek 16'

Umpires:
Napoleon Chanamthabam (IND)
James Unkles (AUS)

8 October 2018
17:00

Malaysia	4–2	Mexico
Anuar 4'; Ishak 8', 19'; Mat 19'	Report	Villegas 14'; Estrada 20'

Umpires:
Hristiyan Vasilev (BUL)
Peter Kabaso (KEN)

8 October 2018
17:45

Argentina	18–0	Vanuatu
Marcucci 2', 3', 7', 10', 15'; Zárate 4', 19'; Micaz 5', 11', 12'; Garrone 5', 11'; Ibarra 6', 8', 16', 18'; Sarto 14', 20'	Report

Umpires:
Napoleon Chanamthabam (IND)
James Unkles (AUS)

9 October 2018
11:45

Zambia	2–7	Malaysia
Mulenga 2', 3'	Report	Rosdi 3'; Anuar 6', 10', 12', 20'; Azahar 9'; Mat 13'

Umpires:
Peter Kabaso (KEN)
James Unkles (AUS)

9 October 2018
12:30

Mexico	8–3	Vanuatu
Estrada 2', 13'; Hernández 3', 10'; Palma 3'; Villegas 6', 17'; Sosa 18'	Report	Iawila 7'; Job 13', 19'

Umpires:
Napoleon Chanamthabam (IND)
Darren Hubach (RSA)

9 October 2018
13:15

Poland	2–5	Argentina
Nitka 4'; Nowakowski 20'	Report	Garrone 3'; Sarto 9', 14'; Marcucci 11'; Ibarra 20'

Umpires:
Peter Kabaso (KEN)
Nick Saunders (NZL)

10 October 2018
14:45

Mexico	6–4	Zambia
Hernández 2'; Estrada 6'; Palma 7'; Villegas 10', 13'; Sosa 15'	Report	Bwali 14', 20'; Mubanga 17', 18'

Umpires:
James Unkles (AUS)
Napoleon Chanamthabam (IND)

10 October 2018
15:30

Vanuatu	1–15	Poland
Katmatem 19'	Report	Jarzyński 1', 7'; E. Bembenek 1', 9', 15', 18', 20'; Chumeńczuk 8'; Zabłocki 9', 13', 14'; Nowakowski 10', 15', 16'; T. Bembenek 13'

Umpires:
Peter Kabaso (KEN)
Hristiyan Vasilev (BUL)

10 October 2018
17:00

Malaysia	2–4	Argentina
Rosdi 5'; Ishak 9'	Report	Sarto 8', 14', 19'; Zárate 10'

Umpires:
James Unkles (AUS)
Peter Kabaso (KEN)

11 October 2018
09:30

Vanuatu	1–17	Zambia
Lily 20'	Report	Mubanga 2', 4', 11', 11'; Moyo 7', 12', 12', 13', 18', 19'; Bwali 8', 15', 17', 19'; Siwale 9'; Banda 16'; Kapeso 20'

Umpires:
Nick Saunders (NZL)
Napoleon Chanamthabam (IND)

11 October 2018
10:15

Poland	3–4	Malaysia
Jarzyński 7'; E. Bembenek 7'; Nowakowski 11'	Report	Anuar 1', 16', 17'; Azahar 3'

Umpires:
Hideki Kinoshita (JPN)
James Unkles (AUS)

11 October 2018
11:00

Argentina	3–0	Mexico
Garrone 2'; Zárate 6'; Sarto 8'	Report

Umpires:
Napoleon Chanamthabam (IND)
Peter Kabaso (KEN)

==== Pool B ====
Pos	Team	Pld	W	D	L	GF	GA	GD	Pts	Qualification
1	Australia	5	5	0	0	23	9	+14	15	Quarterfinals
2	India	5	4	0	1	34	8	+26	12	Quarterfinals
3	Austria	5	3	0	2	11	16	−5	9	Quarterfinals
4	Bangladesh	5	2	0	3	12	22	−10	6	Quarterfinals
5	Canada	5	1	0	4	13	22	−9	3	9th place game
6	Kenya	5	0	0	5	10	26	−16	0	11th place game

Source: FIH
Rules for classification: 1) Points; 2) Goal difference; 3) Goals scored; 4) Head-to-head result.

7 October 2018
11:00

Australia	7–0	Kenya
Murray 4', 16'; Collins 5', 8'; Carr 14'; Davis 17'; White 17'	Report

Umpires:
Jonathan Altamirano (MEX)
Darren Hubach (RSA)

7 October 2018
11:45

India	10–0	Bangladesh
Anand 4'; Rajbhar 4', 9'; Sanjay 6'; Vivek 9', 18'; Chirmako 11', 17'; Maninder 12'; Rabichandra 20'	Report

Umpires:
Hideki Kinoshita (JPN)
Hristiyan Vasilev (BUL)

7 October 2018
12:30

Canada	2–3	Austria
Childs 6'; Butt 12'	Report	Wellan 3'; Matousek 5', 13'

Umpires:
Nick Saunders (NZL)
Jonathan Altamirano (MEX)

8 October 2018
14:00

Australia	4–3	Bangladesh
B. Marais 1'; C. Marais 6'; White 10'; Murray 11'	Report	Sobuj 4'; Alam 11'; Sarowar 18'

Umpires:
Jonathan Altamirano (MEX)
Darren Hubach (RSA)

8 October 2018
14:45

India	9–1	Austria
Sanjay 2'; Anand 4', 10', 17'; Chirmako 6', 11', 14', 18'; Vivek 13'	Report	Drusany 8'

Umpires:
Hristiyan Vasilev (BUL)
Nick Saunders (NZL)

8 October 2018
15:30

Kenya	3–4	Canada
Ogenche 18', 20'; Ouma 19'	Report	G. Singh 1'; Farion 5'; Butt 6'; Childs 15'

Umpires:
Hideki Kinoshita (JPN)
Darren Hubach (RSA)

9 October 2018
09:30

Kenya	1–7	India
Ouma 7'	Report	Chirmako 5', 10'; Rabichandra 5', 11'; Vivek 8'; Sanjay 14'; Rajbhar 17'

Umpires:
Hideki Kinoshita (JPN)
Jonathan Altamirano (MEX)

9 October 2018
10:15

Austria	3–0	Bangladesh
Matousek 9', 14'; Trnka 18'	Report

Umpires:
Nick Saunders (NZL)
Hristiyan Vasilev (BUL)

9 October 2018
11:00

Canada	3–6	Australia
Guraliuk 10', 13'; G. Singh 15'	Report	C. Marais 1'; Murray 4', 20'; Davis 7'; Carr 9'; Collins 19'

Umpires:
Hideki Kinoshita (JPN)
Jonathan Altamirano (MEX)

10 October 2018
14:00

Austria	4–3	Kenya
Matousek 2'; Drusany 4'; Nyckowiak 10', 18'	Report	Ouma 4'; Omutekete 10'; Ogenche 14'

Umpires:
Hristiyan Vasilev (BUL)
Darren Hubach (RSA)

10 October 2018
16:15

Bangladesh	5–2	Canada
Alam 8', 16'; H. Mohammad 12'; Sobuj 13'; Hossain 17'	Report	Butt 3'; G. Singh 18'

Umpires:
Hideki Kinoshita (JPN)
Darren Hubach (RSA)

10 October 2018
17:45

India	3–4	Australia
Vivek 6', 18'; Anand 20'	Report	Davis 2'; Collins 3'; Murray 18'; B. Marais 19'

Umpires:
Nick Saunders (NZL)
Jonathan Altamirano (MEX)

11 October 2018
11:45

Australia	2–0	Austria
Murray 9'; B. Marais 17'	Report

Umpires:
Nick Saunders (NZL)
Jonathan Altamirano (MEX)

11 October 2018
12:30

Bangladesh	4–3	Kenya
M. Mohammad 7'; Sarowar 8'; H. Mohammad 15'; Hossain 18'	Report	Ogenche 4', 6'; Ouma 11'

Umpires:
Hideki Kinoshita (JPN)
Darren Hubach (RSA)

11 October 2018
13:15

Canada	2–5	India
Childs 15', 16'	Report	Sanjay 4', 17'; Anand 7'; Chirmako 10'; Rajbhar 17'

Umpires:
Jonathan Altamirano (MEX)
Hristiyan Vasilev (BUL)

=== Final round ===
Fifth place
Poland	4 (2)
Australia	4 (1)
Seventh place
Bangladesh	2 (0)
Austria	2 (2)

5–8th place semifinals
Bangladesh	4
Poland	5
Austria	3
Australia	8

Quarterfinals
Argentina	5
Bangladesh	0
India	4
Poland	2
Malaysia	2
Austria	0
Australia	4
Zambia	6

Semifinals
Argentina	1
India	3
Malaysia	7
Zambia	4

Final
India	2
Malaysia	4
Third place
Argentina	4
Zambia	0

==== Eleventh place game ====
12 October 2018
08:00

Vanuatu	2–9	Kenya
Muliaki 4'; Job 18'	Report	Wanganga 2', 17'; Ogenche 4', 12'; Ouma 6', 20'; Ndombi 9', 9'; Ndwati 10'

Umpires:
Napoleon Chanamthabam (IND)
Darren Hubach (RSA)

==== Ninth place game ====
12 October 2018
13:00

Mexico	2–1	Canada
Hernández 3'; Palma 6'	Report	Dhillon 13'

Umpires:
Hideki Kinoshita (JPN)
James Unkles (AUS)

==== Quarterfinals ====
12 October 2018
9:00

Malaysia	2–0	Austria
Anuar 11', 19'	Report

Umpires:
Hideki Kinoshita (JPN)
Jonathan Altamirano (MEX)

12 October 2018
10:00

Australia	4–6	Zambia
Murray 5'; Davis 8'; Collins 11'; Carr 17'	Report	Moyo 2', 19'; Bwali 6', 10', 18'; Mulenga 14'

Umpires:
Napoleon Chanamthabam (IND)
Hristiyan Vasilev (BUL)

12 October 2018
11:00

India	4–2	Poland
Anand 1', 8'; Maninder 3'; Sanjay 17'	Report	E. Bembenek 16'; Nowakowski 18'

Umpires:
Darren Hubach (RSA)
James Unkles (AUS)

12 October 2018
12:00

Argentina	5–0	Bangladesh
Zárate 1', 8', 12'; Marcucci 17'; Ibarra 18'	Report

Umpires:
Peter Kabaso (KEN)
Nick Saunders (NZL)

==== 5–8th place RD4 ====
13 October 2018
09:00

Bangladesh	4–5	Poland
Sobuj 13', 15', 17'; Mohammad 20'	Report	Nitka 4'; Nowakowski 6'; Jarzyński 9', 14', 18'

Umpires:
Napoleon Chanamthabam (IND)
James Unkles (AUS)

13 October 2018
10:00

Austria	3–8	Australia
Trnka 9', 14', 17'	Report	B. Marais 1'; Murray 2'; Collins 5', 8', 13'; Carr 6', 12'; White 16'

Umpires:
Hideko Kinoshita (JPN)
Darren Hubach (RSA)

==== Semifinals ====
13 October 2018
14:00

Malaysia	7–4	Zambia
Anuar 1', 9', 20'; Rosdi 4', 7'; Moharam 12'; Mat 13'	Report	Moyo 6', 19'; Bwali 14', 18'

Umpires:
Nick Saunders (NZL)
Jonathan Altamirano (MEX)

13 October 2018
15:00

Argentina	1–3	India
Zárate 4'	Report	Rajbhar 3'; Chirmako 12', 18'

Umpires:
Peter Kabaso (KEN)
Hristiyan Vasilev (BUL)

==== Seventh place game ====
14 October 2018
08:30

Bangladesh	2–2	Austria
Sarowar 1'; Sobuj 2'	Report	Albrecht 7'; Drusany 8'
Penalties
Sarowar (penalty shoot-out missed); Hossain (penalty shoot-out missed)	0–2	(penalty shoot-out scored) Nyckowiak; (penalty shoot-out missed) Trnka; (penalty shoot-out scored) Matousek

Umpires:
Darren Hubach (RSA)
James Unkles (AUS)

==== Fifth place game ====
14 October 2018
10:30

Poland	4–4	Australia
E. Bembenek 16'; Jarzyński 18'; Nowakowski 20'; T. Bembenek 20'	Report	Carr 4'; Davis 8'; B. Marais 10'; Collins 14'
Penalties
E. Bembenek (penalty shoot-out missed); Chumeńczuk (penalty shoot-out scored); Jarzyński (penalty shoot-out missed); Chumeńczuk (penalty shoot-out scored)	2–1	(penalty shoot-out scored) Collins; (penalty shoot-out missed) Carr; (penalty shoot-out missed) Murray; (penalty shoot-out missed) Collins

Umpires:
Napoleon Chanamthabam (IND)
Nick Saunders (NZL)

==== Bronze medal game ====
14 October 2018
13:00

(bronze) Argentina	4–0	Zambia
Zárate 4', 14'; Sarto 10'; Ibarra 19'	Report

Umpires:
Peter Kabaso (KEN)
Hideki Kinoshita (JPN)

==== Gold medal game ====
14 October 2018
15:00

(silver) India	2–4	Malaysia (gold)
Vivek 3', 6'	Report	Rosdi 5'; Anuar 14', 19'; Azahar 18'

Umpires:
Jonathan Altamirano (MEX)
Hristiyan Vasilev (BUL)

== Statistics ==
=== Final ranking ===
Rank	Team	Competitors
Gold medal	Malaysia	Hamiz Ahir, Shahrul Saupi, Amirul Azahar, Arif Ishak, Syarman Mat, Kamarulzaman Kamaruddin, Muhibuddin Moharam, Firdaus Rosdi, Akhimullah Anuar
Silver medal	India	Prashant Chauhan, Shivam Anand, Rahul Rajbhar, Maninder Singh, Sanjay, Sudeep Chirmako, Pawan, Rabichandra Moirangthem, Vivek Prasad
Bronze medal	Argentina	Nehuen Hernando, Facundo Zárate, Ignacio Ibarra, Gaspar Garrone, Tadeo Marcucci, Santiago Micaz, Facundo Sarto, Lisandro Zago, Agustín Cabaña
4	Zambia	Robson Kunda, Kennedy Siwale, Dominic Mulenga, Simon Banda, Phillimon Bwali, David Kapeso, Andrew Moyo, Joseph Mubanga, Jeff Phiri
5	Poland	Jakub Gebler, Tomasz Bembenek, Gracjan Jarzyński, Dawid Zabłocki, Korneliusz Nitka, Jakub Chumeńczuk, Marcin Szczęsny, Michał Nowakowski, Eryk Bembenek
6	Australia	Jed Snowden, Chris Starkie, Lain Carr, Bradley Marais, James Collins, Alistair Murray, Ben White, Miles Davis, Craig Marais
7	Austria	Florian Albrecht, Yannick Matousek, Paul Drusany, Maximilian Trnka, Nikolas Wellan, Jakob Scherf, Jan Gruener, Benjamin Koelbl, Marcin Nyckowiak
8	Bangladesh	Biplob Kujur, Sobuj Shohanur, Safiul Alam, Hasan Mohammad, Sawon Sarower, Mohsin Mohammad, Uddin Mohammad, Prince Samundo, Arshad Hossain
9	Mexico	Jesús Pérez, Jorge Estrada, Matías Guzmán, Erik Hernández, Alexander Palma, Brian Rangel, Luis Villegas, Jorge Gómez, Juan Sosa
10	Canada	Ethan McTavish, Roopkanwar Dhillon, Arjun Hothi, Brendan Guraliuk, Shazab Butt, Amraaz Dhillon, Ganga Singh, Isaac Farion, Rowan Childs
11	Kenya	Paul Ongadi, Richard Wanganga, Olando Ouma, Ivan Ludiali, Brian Ogenche, Bryton Ndwati, Edson Ndombi, Robinson Omutekete, Samuel Silong
12	Vanuatu	Lovis Iawila, Inias Muliaki, Francois Simeon, Jetro Namak, Stephen Nulak, Nicholsen Job, Jossie Lily, John Katmatem, Jeremy Nukur

=== Goalscorers ===
There were 346 goals scored in 44 matches, for an average of 7.86 goals per match.

22 goals

- (Malaysia) Akhimullah Anuar

13 goals

- (Zambia) Philimon Bwali

11 goals

- (Argentina) Facundo Zárate
- (India) Sudeep Chirmako

10 goals

- (Argentina) Facundo Sarto
- (Argentina) Ignacio Ibarra
- (Poland) Eryk Bembenek

9 goals

- (Australia) Alistair Murray
- (Australia) James Collins
- (Poland) Gracjan Jarzyński
- (Poland) Michał Nowakowski
- (Zambia) Andrew Moyo
- (Zambia) Joseph Mubanga

8 goals

- (Argentina) Tadeo Marcucci
- (India) Shivam Anand
- (India) Vivek Prasad

7 goals

- (Kenya) Brian Ogenche
- (Malaysia) Firadus Rosdi

6 goals

- (Australia) Lain Carr
- (Bangladesh) Shohanur Sobuj
- (India) Sanjay
- (Kenya) Olando Ouma
- (Mexico) Luis Villegas

5 goals

- (Australia) Bradley Marais
- (Australia) Miles Davis
- (Austria) Yannick Matousek
- (Mexico) Jorge Estrada

4 goals

- (Argentina) Gaspar Garrone
- (Austria) Maximilian Trnka
- (Canada) Rowan Childs
- (Canada) Shazab Butt
- (India) Rahul Rajbhar
- (India) Rabichandra Singh Moirangthem
- (Malaysia) Amirul Azahar
- (Malaysia) Arif Ishak
- (Malaysia) Syarman Mat
- (Mexico) Alexander Palma
- (Mexico) Erik Hernández
- (Poland) Dawid Zabłocki
- (Poland) Korneliusz Nitka

3 goals

- (Argentina) Santiago Micaz
- (Austria) Paul Drusany
- (Australia) Benjamin White
- (Bangladesh) Hasan Mohammad
- (Bangladesh) Saiful Alam
- (Bangladesh) Sawon Sarowar
- (Kenya) Richard Wanganga
- (Malaysia) Muhibddin Moharam
- (Poland) Tomasz Bembenek
- (Vanuatu) Nicholsen Job
- (Zambia) Dominic Mulenga
- (Zambia) Kennedy Siwale

2 goals

- (Australia) Craig Marais
- (Austria) Marcin Nyckowiak
- (Bangladesh) Arhsad Hossain
- (Canada) Brendan Guraliuk
- (Canada) Ganga Singh
- (India) Maninder Singh
- (Kenya) Edson Ndombi
- (Mexico) Juan Sosa
- (Vanuatu) Lovis Iawila

1 goal

- (Austria) Florian Albrecht
- (Austria) Nikolaus Wellan
- (Bangladesh) Mohsin Mohammad
- (Canada) Amraaz Dhillon
- (Canada) Isaac Farion
- (Kenya) Bryton Ndwati
- (Poland) Jakub Chumeńczuk
- (Vanuatu) Jon Katmatem
- (Vanuatu) Jossie Lily
- (Zambia) David Kapeso
- (Zambia) Simon Banda
