= Marco De Tullio =

Italian swimmer (born 2000)

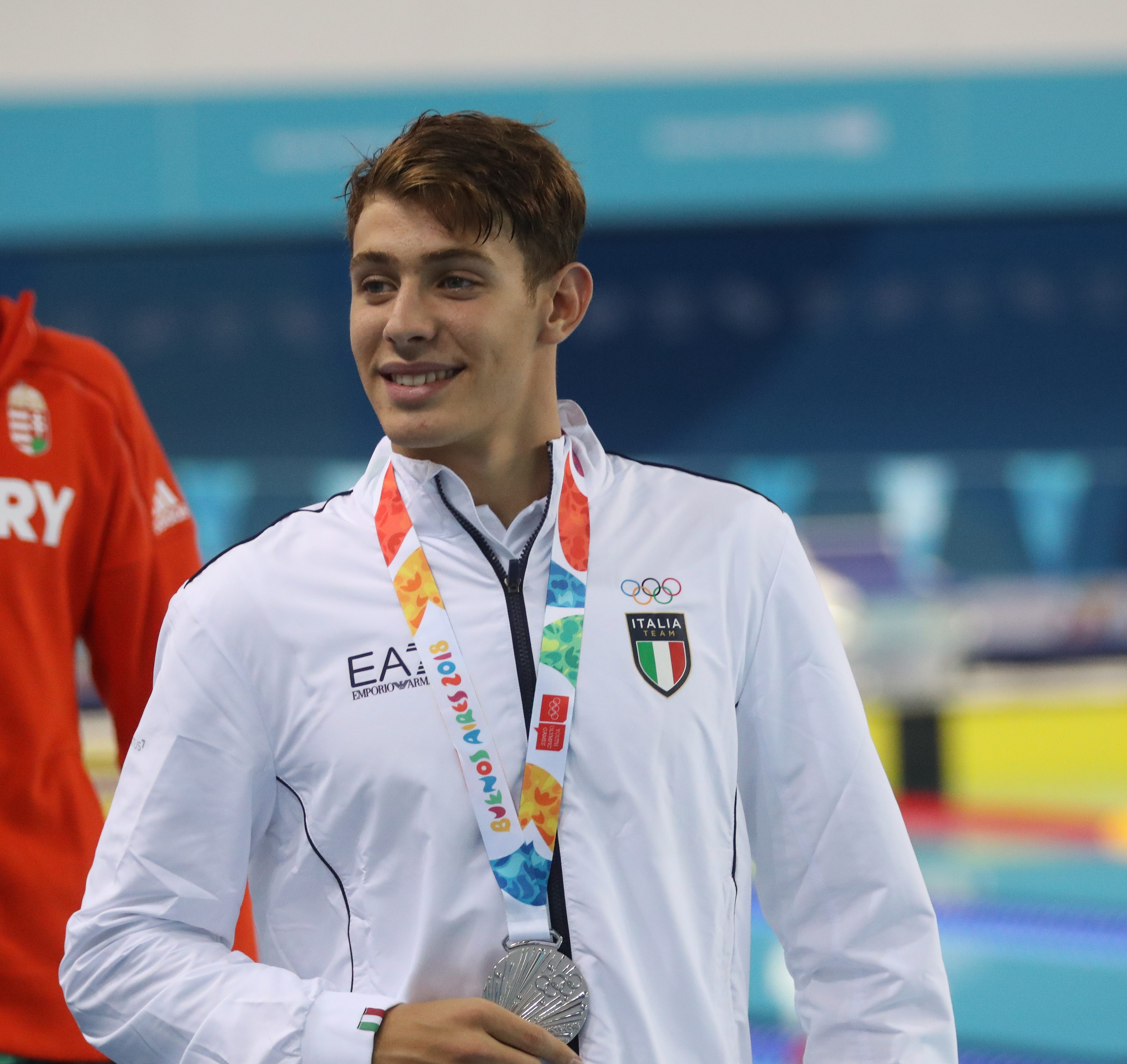
- Marco De Tullio in 2018

Personal information
- Born: 21 September 2000 (age 25) Bari, Italy

Sport
- Sport: Swimming
- Strokes: Freestyle
Medal record
Men's swimming
Representing Italy
European Championships (LC)
Silver medal – second place	2022 Rome	4×200 m freestyle
Bronze medal – third place	2020 Budapest	4×200 m freestyle
European Championships (SC)
Bronze medal – third place	2021 Kazan	400 m freestyle
Summer Youth Olympics
Silver medal – second place	2018 Buenos Aires	400 m freestyle
Bronze medal – third place	2018 Buenos Aires	800 m freestyle

Marco De Tullio (born 21 September 2000) is an Italian swimmer. He represented Italy at the 2019 World Aquatics Championships held in Gwangju, South Korea. He competed in the men's 400 metre freestyle event.

== Career ==
In 2018, he represented Italy at the Summer Youth Olympics in Buenos Aires, Argentina. In the boys' 400 metre freestyle event he won the silver medal and in the boys' 800 metre freestyle event he won the bronze medal.

In 2021, he won the bronze medal in the men's 4 × 200 metre freestyle relay event at the 2020 European Aquatics Championships held in Budapest, Hungary. In July 2021, he competed in the men's 400 metre freestyle and men's 4 × 200 metre freestyle relay events at the 2020 Summer Olympics held in Tokyo, Japan.

== Personal life ==
He is the brother of the swimmer Luca De Tullio.
