= Spain at the 2018 Summer Youth Olympics =

- IOC code: ESP
- NOC: Spanish Olympic Committee
- Website: www.coe.es

in Buenos Aires
- Competitors: 85 in 24 sports
- Flag bearer: María Vicente
- Medals Ranked 46th: Gold 1 Silver 3 Bronze 5 Total 9

Summer Youth Olympics appearances (overview)
- 2010; 2014; 2018; 2026

Spain competed at the 2018 Summer Youth Olympics, in Buenos Aires, Argentina from 6 to 18 October 2018.

== Medalists ==
Medal	Name	Sport	Event	Date
Gold	Spain men's youth beach handball team: Adrián Bandera; Guillermo García-Cabañas; Carlos González; Pau Ferré; Domingo Jesús Luis; David Martínez; Sergio Pérez; Pedro Rodríguez; Sergio José Venegas	Beach handball	Boys' tournament	October 13
Silver	Nina Font	Sailing	Girls' IKA Twin Tip Racing	October 14
Silver	Elia Canales	Archery		
Silver	María Vicente	Athletics	Triple jump	
Bronze	Javier Peña Insausti	Judo	Boys' 66 kg	October 7
Bronze	Manuel Martos	Swimming	Boys' 200 metre backstroke	October 12
Bronze	Yoel Becerra	Canoeing	Boys' C1 slalom	October 15
Bronze	Carla García	Athletics	400m hurdles	
Bronze	Women's Futsal	Futsal	Women's tournament	

== Archery ==
Spain qualified one archer based on its performance at the 2017 World Archery Youth Championships. Later, Spain qualified a male archer based on its performance at the 2018 European Youth Championships.

Athlete	Event	Ranking round		Round of 32	Round of 16	Quarterfinals	Semifinals	Final / BM	Rank
Athlete	Event	Score	Seed	Opposition Score	Opposition Score	Opposition Score	Opposition Score	Opposition Score	Rank
José Manuel Solera	Boys' singles	657	21	Soithong (THA); W 6-4	Akash (IND); L 2-6	Did not advance			9
Èlia Canales	Girls' singles	645	11	Paeglis (AUS); W 6-2	Reisenweber (GER); W 6-2	GNoriega (USA); W 7-3	Vazquez Cadena (MEX); W 6-4	Zhang (CHN); L 2-6	2nd place, silver medalist(s)
Èlia Canales; Tetsuya Aoshima (JPN)	Mixed Team	1299	19	Naumova (UKR); Eyeni (CIV); L 4-5	did not advance				17
José Manuel Solera; Kyla Touraine-Helias (FRA)	Mixed Team	1301	11	Rong-jia (TPE); Lee (CAN); W 6-0	Sliachticas Caetano (BRA); Ross (BEL); W 6-2	Kharitonova (RUS); Rezowan (BAN); W 5-1	Reddig (NAM); Cowles (USA); W 5-3	Giannasio (ARG); Soithong (THA); W 5-1	1st place, gold medalist(s)

== Athletics ==
- Men's 400 metres - 1 quota place (Bernat Erta)
- Men's 800 metres - 1 quota place (Eric Guzmán)
- Men's 3000 metres - 1 quota (Hugo De Miguel)
- Men's 400 metres hurdles - 1 quota (Ignacio Saez)
- Men's 2000 metres steeplechase - 1 quota (Pol Oriach)
- Men's pole vault - 1 quota (Artur Coll)
- Men's discus throw - 1 quota place Yasiel Sotero
- Men's cross country race - 2 quotas (Hugo De Miguel, Pol Oriach)
- Women's 100 metres - 1 quota (Laura Pintiel)
- Women's 200 metres - 1 quota (Esperança Cladera)
- Women's 400 metres - 1 quota (Andrea Jiménez)
- Women's 800 metres - 1 quota (Lucía Sicre)
- Women's 100 metres hurdles (Isabel Velasco)
- Women's 400 metres hurdles (Carla García)
- Women's 2000 metres steeplechase - 1 quota (María González)
- Women's 5000 metres race walk - 1 quota place (Ana Pulgarin)
- Women's pole vault - 1 quota (Ana María Chacón)
- Women's triple jump - 1 quota place María Vicente
- Women's hammer throw - 1 quota place (Aitana Safont)
- Women's cross country race - 1 quota (María González)

== Badminton ==
Spain qualified one player based on the Badminton Junior World Rankings.

Singles

Athlete	Event	Group stage				Quarterfinal	Semifinal	Final / BM	Rank
Athlete	Event	Opposition Score	Opposition Score	Opposition Score	Rank	Opposition Score	Opposition Score	Opposition Score	Rank
Tomás Toledano	Boys' singles	Li (CHN); L (21–11, 21–13)	Carraggi (BEL); L (21–3, 21–15)	Toti (ITA); W (13–21, 14–21)	3	Did not advance			9
Elena Andreu	Girls' singles	Jakka (IND); L (21–13, 21–6)	Saponara (PER); W (17–21, 13–21)	Gai (USA); L (21–10, 22–20)	3	Did not advance			9

Team

Athlete	Event	Group stage				Quarterfinal	Semifinal	Final / BM	Rank
Athlete	Event	Opposition Score	Opposition Score	Opposition Score	Rank	Opposition Score	Opposition Score	Opposition Score	Rank
Team Epsilon; Tomás Toledano (ESP); Chen Shiau-cheng (TPE); Fabricio Farias (BRA); Nguyễn Hải Đăng (VIE); Goh Jin Wei (MAS); Vlada Gînga (MDA); Aminat Oluwafunke Ilori (NGR); Nazlıcan İnci (TUR)	Mixed Teams	Alpha (MIX); L (98–110)	Zeta (MIX); L (89–110)	Delta (MIX); W (110–108)	4Q	Omega (MIX); L (102–110)	Did not advance		5
Team Delta; Elena Andreu (ESP); Mateo Delmastro (ARG); Arnaud Merklé (FRA); Dmitriy Panarin (KAZ); Balázs Pápai (HUN); Pattarasuda Chaiwan (THA); Madouc Linders (NED); Petra Polanc (SLO)	Mixed Teams	Zeta (MIX); W (110–95)	Alpha (MIX); W (110–99)	Epsilon (MIX); L (108–110)	1Q	Theta (MIX); L (93–110)	Did not advance		5

== Basketball ==
Spain qualified a female team due to their position at the FIBA U18 3x3 National Federation Ranking.

Event	Group stage					Quarterfinal	Semifinal	Final / BM	
Event	Opposition Score	Opposition Score	Opposition Score	Opposition Score	Rank	Opposition Score	Opposition Score	Opposition Score	Rank
Girls' tournament	Czech Republic; L 13–16	Estonia; L 11–21	Australia; W 12–7	Netherlands; L 12–14	3	Did not advance			

Shoot-out contest

Athlete	Event	Qualification		Final					
Athlete	Event	Points	Rank	Round 1	Round 2	Round 3	Round 4	Total	Rank
Estel Puiggros	Shoot-out contest	1	32	Did not advance					32
Mama Dembele	Shoot-out contest	0	36	Did not advance					36

== Beach handball ==
Spain qualified a boys' team (9 athletes) to the tournament. However, due to the rules of the Games only allowing the National Olympic Committees (NOCs) to enter one team sport (futsal, beach handball, field hockey or rugby sevens) per gender, it has not yet been made official in which event they will participate.

== Beach volleyball ==
Spain qualified a girls' team based on their performance at 2017-18 European Youth Continental Cup Final.

Athletes	Event	Preliminary round		Round of 24	Round of 16	Quarterfinals	Semifinals	Final / BM	Rank
Athletes	Event	Opposition Score	Rank	Opposition Score	Opposition Score	Opposition Score	Opposition Score	Opposition Score	Rank
Daniela Álvarez Mendoza; Tania Moreno Matveeva	Girls'	Simisterra–Castro (ECU); W 2-0; Corbacho–Vargas (URU); W 2-0; Pawarun–Thatsarida (THA); W 2-0	1 Q	—N/a	Villar–Churín (ARG); W 2-0	Newberry–Sparks (USA); L 1-2	Did not advance		

== Canoeing ==
Spain qualified three athletes based on its performance at the 2018 World Qualification Event in Barcelona.

Athlete	Event	Qualification		Repechage		Last 16	Quarterfinals	Semifinals	Final / BM	Rank
Athlete	Event	Time	Rank	Time	Rank	Opposition Result	Opposition Result	Opposition Result	Opposition Result	Rank
Yoel Becerra	Boys' C1 sprint	1:58.64	9	2:00.10	5	—N/a	Did not advance			
Yoel Becerra	Boys' C1 slalom	1:23.75	4	Bye		—N/a	Beiranvand (IRI); W 1:23.90	Saramandif (MRI); L 1:28.80	Kuzyk (UKR); W 1:23.22	3rd place, bronze medalist(s)
Antia Otero	Girls' C1 sprint	2:19.30	2	Bye		Lewandowski (GER); W 2:25.98	Guzmán (MEX); L 2:19.94	Did not advance		
Antia Otero	Girls' C1 slalom	1:42.02	12	1:43.25	4	Delassus (FRA); L 1:40.67	Did not advance			

== Cycling ==
Spain qualified a boys' combined team based on its ranking in the Youth Olympic Games Junior Nation Rankings.

- Boys' combined team - 1 team of 2 athletes

Athlete	Event	Team time trial			Road race			XC eliminator		XC short circuit			Criterium				Total	
Athlete	Event	Time	Rank	Points	Time	Rank	Points	Rank	Points	Time	Rank	Points	Laps	Sprint pts	Rank	Points	Points	Rank
Carlos Canal	Boys' combined team	9:09.24	16	1	1:31:03	24	0	8	20	20:07	15	2	16	0	27	0	73	12
David Campos	Boys' combined team	9:09.24	16	1	DNF			4	50	DNF			16	0	26	0	73	12

== Diving ==
Athlete	Event	Preliminary		Final	
Athlete	Event	Points	Rank	Points	Rank
Adrián Abadía	Boys' 3 m springboard	463.10	13	Did not advance	
Valeria Antolino	Girls' 3 m springboard	393.95	9 Q	400.80	10

== Fencing ==
Spain qualified one athlete based on its performance at the 2018 FIE Cadet World Championships.

Athlete	Event	Pool Round	Seed	Round of 16	Quarterfinals	Semifinals	Final / BM	Rank
Athlete	Event	Opposition Score	Seed	Opposition Score	Opposition Score	Opposition Score	Opposition Score	Rank
Alonso Santamaría	Sabre	Păștin (ROU) W 5–0; Rios (ARG) W 5–3; Santana (PUR) W 5–2; Jarry (FRA) L 0–5; Albahrani (KSA) W 5–2; Kato (JPN) W 5–3	2 Q	Mahbas (IRQ); W 15–9	Vidovszky (USA); L 13–15	did not advance		

== Futsal ==
Spain qualified the girls' team (10 athletes) to the tournament. However, due to the rules of the Games only allowing the NOCs to enter one team sport (futsal, beach handball, field hockey or rugby sevens) per gender, it has not yet been made official in which event they will participate.

== Golf ==
Individual

Athlete	Event	Round 1		Round 2			Round 3			Total		
Athlete	Event	Score	Rank	Score	Total	Rank	Score	Total	Rank	Score	Par	Rank
Blanca Fernández García-Poggio	Girls' Individual	77 (+7)	15	77 (+7)	154	19	74 (+4)	228	12	228	+18	18
David Puig	Boys' Individual	72 (+2)	9	78 (+8)	150	26	72 (+2)	222	9	222	+12	14

Team

Athletes	Event	Round 1 (Fourball)		Round 2 (Foursome)		Round 3 (Individual Stroke)				Total		
Athletes	Event	Score	Rank	Score	Rank	Girl	Boy	Total	Rank	Score	Par	Rank
Blanca Fernández García-Poggio; David Puig	Mixed team	67 (-3)	22	74 (+4)	15	75	70	145 (+5)	9	286	+6	13

== Gymnastics ==
=== Artistic ===
Spain qualified one gymnast based on its performance at the 2018 European Junior Championship.

Girls

Athlete	Event	Apparatus				Total	Rank
Athlete	Event	V	UB	BB	F	Total	Rank
Alba Petisco	Qualification	13.062	11.933	10.833	11.133	47.265	16 Q
Alba Petisco	All-around	13.333	12.200	11.633	11.966	49.132	11
Alba Petisco	Vault	13.062	—N/a			13.062	11
Alba Petisco	Uneven bars	—N/a	11.933	—N/a		11.933	14
Alba Petisco	Balance beam	—N/a		10.833	—N/a	10.833	22
Alba Petisco	Floor	—N/a			11.133	11.133	30

=== Rhythmic ===
Spain qualified one rhythmic gymnast based on its performance at the European qualification event.

Athlete	Event	Qualification						Final					
Athlete	Event	Hoop	Ball	Clubs	Ribbon	Total	Rank	Hoop	Ball	Clubs	Ribbon	Total	Rank
Paula Serrano	Individual	13.950	14.850	15.150	11.600	55.550	15	Did not advance					

=== Trampoline ===
Spain qualified two athletes based on its performance at the European trampoline qualification event.

Athlete	Event	Qualification				Final	
Athlete	Event	Routine 1	Routine 2	Total	Rank	Score	Rank
Robert Vilarasau	Boys	44.725	56.230	100.955	6 Q	56.995	5
Marina Chavarria	Girls	42.315	51.025	93.340	4 Q	50.985	4

=== Multidiscipline ===
Team	Athlete	Acrobatic	Artistic	Rhythmic	Trampoline	Total points	Rank
Team Simone Biles (Orange)	Mariela Kostadinova (BUL); Panayot Dimitrov (BUL)	10	—N/a			293	1st place, gold medalist(s)
Team Simone Biles (Orange)	Ruan Lange (RSA)	—N/a	17	—N/a		293	1st place, gold medalist(s)
Team Simone Biles (Orange)	Krisztián Balázs (HUN)	—N/a	34	—N/a		293	1st place, gold medalist(s)
Team Simone Biles (Orange)	Nazar Chepurnyi (UKR)	—N/a	70	—N/a		293	1st place, gold medalist(s)
Team Simone Biles (Orange)	Tamara Ong (SGP)	—N/a	38	—N/a		293	1st place, gold medalist(s)
Team Simone Biles (Orange)	Phạm Như Phương (VIE)	—N/a	48	—N/a		293	1st place, gold medalist(s)
Team Simone Biles (Orange)	Alba Petisco (ESP)	—N/a	40	—N/a		293	1st place, gold medalist(s)
Team Simone Biles (Orange)	Talisa Torretti (ITA)	—N/a		13	—N/a	293	1st place, gold medalist(s)
Team Simone Biles (Orange)	Daria Trubnikova (RUS)	—N/a		4	—N/a	293	1st place, gold medalist(s)
Team Simone Biles (Orange)	Yelyzaveta Luzan (AZE)	—N/a		–	—N/a	293	1st place, gold medalist(s)
Team Simone Biles (Orange)	Liam Christie (AUS)	—N/a			17	293	1st place, gold medalist(s)
Team Simone Biles (Orange)	Fan Xiny (CHN)	—N/a			2	293	1st place, gold medalist(s)
Team Max Whitlock	Madalena Cavilhas (POR); Manuel Candeias (POR)	20	—N/a			349	2nd place, silver medalist(s)
Team Max Whitlock	Fernando Espíndola (ARG)	—N/a	43	—N/a		349	2nd place, silver medalist(s)
Team Max Whitlock	Takeru Kitazono (JPN)	—N/a	17	—N/a		349	2nd place, silver medalist(s)
Team Max Whitlock	Pablo Calvache (ECU)	—N/a	59	—N/a		349	2nd place, silver medalist(s)
Team Max Whitlock	Camila Montoya (CRC)	—N/a	69	—N/a		349	2nd place, silver medalist(s)
Team Max Whitlock	Ksenia Klimenko (RUS)	—N/a	11	—N/a		349	2nd place, silver medalist(s)
Team Max Whitlock	Zeina Ibrahim (EGY)	—N/a	15	—N/a		349	2nd place, silver medalist(s)
Team Max Whitlock	Rayna Khai Ling Hoh (MAS)	—N/a		18	—N/a	349	2nd place, silver medalist(s)
Team Max Whitlock	Roza Abitova (KAZ)	—N/a		26	—N/a	349	2nd place, silver medalist(s)
Team Max Whitlock	Adelina Beljajeva (EST)	—N/a		47	—N/a	349	2nd place, silver medalist(s)
Team Max Whitlock	Robert Vilarasau (ESP)	—N/a			11	349	2nd place, silver medalist(s)
Team Max Whitlock	Jessica Clarke (GBR)	—N/a			13	349	2nd place, silver medalist(s)
Team Alina Kabaeva (White)	Kapitolina Khusnullina (RUS); Anatolii Slivkov (RUS)	17	—N/a			397	6
Team Alina Kabaeva (White)	Jacob Karlsen (NOR)	—N/a	81	—N/a		397	6
Team Alina Kabaeva (White)	Samad Mammadli (AZE)	—N/a	49	—N/a		397	6
Team Alina Kabaeva (White)	Yeh Cheng (TPE)	—N/a	45	—N/a		397	6
Team Alina Kabaeva (White)	Paulina Vargas (MEX)	—N/a	47	—N/a		397	6
Team Alina Kabaeva (White)	Laura Leonardo (BRA)	—N/a	31	—N/a		397	6
Team Alina Kabaeva (White)	Chiharu Yamada (JPN)	—N/a	34	—N/a		397	6
Team Alina Kabaeva (White)	Elizabeth Kapitonova (USA)	—N/a		20	—N/a	397	6
Team Alina Kabaeva (White)	Kim Mun-ye (PRK)	—N/a		25	—N/a	397	6
Team Alina Kabaeva (White)	Yulia Vodopyanova (ARM)	—N/a		33	—N/a	397	6
Team Alina Kabaeva (White)	Ruben Tavares (POR)	—N/a			5	397	6
Team Alina Kabaeva (White)	Marina Chavarria (ESP)	—N/a			10	397	6
Team Yang Wei (Red)	Liu Yiqian (CHN); Li Zhengyang (CHN)	27	—N/a			403	7
Team Yang Wei (Red)	Felix Dolci (CAN)	—N/a	54	—N/a		403	7
Team Yang Wei (Red)	Martin Guðmundsson (ISL)	—N/a	23	—N/a		403	7
Team Yang Wei (Red)	Bora Tarhan (TUR)	—N/a	63	—N/a		403	7
Team Yang Wei (Red)	Kryxia Alicea (PUR)	—N/a	–	—N/a		403	7
Team Yang Wei (Red)	Aliaksandra Varabyova (BLR)	—N/a	67	—N/a		403	7
Team Yang Wei (Red)	Anastasiia Bachynska (UKR)	—N/a	8	—N/a		403	7
Team Yang Wei (Red)	Maria Arakaki (BRA)	—N/a		18	—N/a	403	7
Team Yang Wei (Red)	Paula Serrano (ESP)	—N/a		55	—N/a	403	7
Team Yang Wei (Red)	Xitlali Santana (MEX)	—N/a		66	—N/a	403	7
Team Yang Wei (Red)	Andrew Stamp (GBR)	—N/a			12	403	7
Team Yang Wei (Red)	Jessica Pickering (AUS)	—N/a			10	403	7

== Judo ==
Athlete	Event	Round of 16	Quarterfinals	Semifinals	Repechage			Final / BM	
Athlete	Event	Round of 16	Quarterfinals	Semifinals	Round of 8	Quarterfinals	Semifinals	Final / BM	
Athlete	Event	Opposition Result	Opposition Result	Opposition Result	Opposition Result	Opposition Result	Opposition Result	Opposition Result	Rank
Eva Pérez Soler	Girls' 44 kg	Hagianu (ROU); W 10–10	Balaban (UKR); L 100–0	Did not advance	—N/a	Abdourahman (DJI); W 100–0	Rojas (ARG); L 0–2	Did not advance	7
Javier Peña Insausti	Boys' 66 kg	Jashari (MKD); W 110–10	Nazarov (UZB); W 100–2	Naguchev (RUS); L 10s1–0	—N/a			Bravo Blanco (CUB); W 110–10	3rd place, bronze medalist(s)

Team

Athletes	Event	Round of 16	Quarterfinals	Semifinals	Final	
Athletes	Event	Opposition Result	Opposition Result	Opposition Result	Opposition Result	Rank
Team Athens; Mireille Andriamifehy (MAD); Martin Bezděk (CZE); Juan Montealegre (COL); Javier Peña Insausti (ESP); Christi Rose Pretorius (ZIM); Tababi Devi Thangjam (IND); Marin Visser (NED); Anwar Zrhari (MAR)	Mixed team	Bye	Team Los Angeles (MIX); W 5–3	Team Rio de Janeiro (MIX); W 5–3	Team Beijing (MIX); L 4–5	2nd place, silver medalist(s)
Team Nanjing; Hasret Bozkurt (TUR); Joaquín Burgos (ARG); Nilufar Ermaganbetova (UZB); Rihari Iki (NZL); Alaa Mousaad Mohamed (EGY); Eva Pérez Soler (ESP); Vugar Talibov (AZE); Romain Valadier-Picard (FRA)	Mixed team	Bye	Team Beijing (MIX); L 3–4	Did not advance		

== Modern pentathlon ==
Spain qualified one pentathlete based on its performance at the European Youth Olympic Games Qualifier.

Athlete	Event	Fencing Ranking Round (épée one touch)		Swimming (200 m freestyle)			Fencing Final round (épée one touch)			Combined: Shooting/Running (10 m air pistol)/(3000 m)			Total Points	Final Rank
Athlete	Event	Results	Rank	Time	Rank	Points	Results	Rank	Points	Time	Rank	Points	Total Points	Final Rank
Laura Heredia	Girls' Individual													
Laura Heredia (ESP); Kamil Kasperczak (POL)	Mixed Relay													

== Roller speed skating ==
Spain qualified two roller skaters based on its performance at the 2018 Roller Speed Skating World Championship.

- Boys' combined speed event - Ivan Galar
- Girls' combined speed event - Nerea Langa

== Rowing ==
Spain qualified one boat based on its performance at the 2017 World Rowing Junior Championships.

Athlete	Event	Time trial		Heats		Repechage		Semifinals		Final	
Athlete	Event	Time	Rank	Time	Rank	Time	Rank	Time	Rank	Time	Rank
Aina Prats	Girls' Single Scull	4:11.61	17								

Qualification Legend: FA=Final A (medal); FB=Final B (non-medal); FC=Final C (non-medal); FD=Final D (non-medal); SA/B=Semifinals A/B; SC/D=Semifinals C/D; R=Repechage

== Sailing ==
Spain qualified two boats based on its performance at the 2018 World Championships.

Athlete	Event	Race													Net Points	Final Rank
Athlete	Event	1	2	3	4	5	6	7	8	9	10	11	12	M	Net Points	Final Rank
Nina Font	Girls' IKA Twin Tip Racing	1	6	6	(7)	2	4	Cancelled						2	-	2nd place, silver medalist(s)
Adrián Surroca; Eloisa Santacreu	Mixed Nacra 15	3	UDF (15)	9	10	8	9	9	4	13	7	3	7	5	87	8

== Shooting ==
Spain qualified one sport shooter based on its performance at the 2018 European Championships.

Individual

Athlete	Event	Qualification		Final	
Athlete	Event	Points	Rank	Points	Rank
Gloria Fernández	Girls' 10m air pistol	544-9x	17	Did not advance	

Team

Athletes	Event	Qualification		Round of 16	Quarterfinals	Semifinals	Final / BM	Rank
Athletes	Event	Points	Rank	Opposition Result	Opposition Result	Opposition Result	Opposition Result	Rank
Gloria Fernández (ESP); Eldar Imankulov (KAZ)	Mixed 10 metre air pistol	737-13	17	Did not advance				

== Swimming ==
Boys

Athlete	Event	Heat		Semifinal		Final	
Athlete	Event	Time	Rank	Time	Rank	Time	Rank
Marcos Gil Corbacho	200 m freestyle	1:51.83	16	—N/a		did not advance	
Marcos Gil Corbacho	400 m freestyle	3:54.22	13	—N/a		did not advance	
Marcos Gil Corbacho	800 m freestyle	—N/a				8:12.93	14
Ferrán Julia	400 m freestyle	3:58.11	22	—N/a		did not advance	
Ferrán Julia	800 m freestyle	—N/a				8:09.92	10
Manuel Martos	50 m backstroke	27.07	22	did not advance			
Manuel Martos	100 m backstroke	56.03	6 Q	56.20	7 Q	55.83	5
Manuel Martos	200 m backstroke	2:00.21	3 Q	—N/a		1:59.37	3rd place, bronze medalist(s)
Ferrán Sire	100 m butterfly	56.37	32	did not advance			
Ferrán Sire	200 m butterfly	2:01.39	6 Q	—N/a		2:01.88	7

Girls

Athlete	Event	Heat		Semifinal		Final	
Athlete	Event	Time	Rank	Time	Rank	Time	Rank
Tamara Frías	50 m backstroke	28.89	4 Q	28.93	8 Q	29.01	6
Tamara Frías	100 m backstroke	1:02.13	7 Q	1:02.17	8 Q	1:01.93	7
Tamara Frías	200 m backstroke	2:15.09	10	—N/a		Did not advance	
Andrea Galisteo	200 m freestyle	2:05.06	24	—N/a		Did not advance	
Andrea Galisteo	400 m freestyle	4:17.07	8 Q	—N/a		4:16.91	7
Andrea Galisteo	800 m freestyle	—N/a				8:49.85	19
Cristina García Kirichenko	100 m backstroke	1:03.54	16 Q	1:03.39	14	Did not advance	
Cristina García Kirichenko	200 m backstroke	2:13.25	4 Q	—N/a		2:13.07	7
Alba Vázquez	100 m breaststroke	1:11.69	21	Did not advance			
Alba Vázquez	200 m breaststroke	2:30.30	4 Q	—N/a		2:29.01	5
Alba Vázquez	200 m medley	2:17.54	11	—N/a		Did not advance	

Mixed

Athlete	Event	Heat		Final	
Athlete	Event	Time	Rank	Time	Rank
Marcos Gil Corbacho; Ferrán Julia; Tamara Frías; Andrea Galisteo	4 × 100 m freestyle relay	3:43.15	17	Did not advance	

== Sport climbing ==
Spain qualified one sport climber based on its performance at the 2017 World Youth Sport Climbing Championships.

Athlete	Event	Speed			Boulder		Repechage		Total	
Athlete	Event	Heat 1	Heat 2	Place Points	Result	Place Points	Result	Place Points	Place	Total points
Mikel Linacisoro	Boys' combined	8.16	7.31	8						

== Taekwondo ==
Spain qualified one quota based on its performance at the 2018 qualification event in Tunisia.

Athlete	Event	Preliminary round	Quarterfinals	Semifinals	Final	Rank
Athlete	Event	Opposition Result	Opposition Result	Opposition Result	Opposition Result	Rank
Hugo Arillo	Boys' −55 kg	Fernandes (CPV); W DQ	Abdul Kareem (JOR); L 25-5	Did not advance		

== Tennis ==
Athlete	Event	Round of 32	Round of 16	Quarterfinals	Semifinals	Final / BM
Athlete	Event	Opposition Score	Opposition Score	Opposition Score	Opposition Score	Opposition Score
Nicolás Álvarez Varona	Boys' Singles	Wenger (SUI); W 6-3, 6-3	Báez (ARG); L 7-5, 4-6, 4-6	did not advance		
Carlos López Montagud	Boys' Singles	Andreev (BUL); L 6-3, 6-3	did not advance			
Nicolás Álvarez Varona; Carlos López Montagud	Boys' Doubles	—N/a	de Jong (NED); Wenger (SUI); L 7-6, 2-6, 8-10	did not advance		
Nicolás Álvarez Varona; Sylvie Zünd (LIE)	Mixed Doubles	Carlé (ARG); Báez (ARG); L 6-4, 6-2	did not advance			
Carlos López Montagud; Oksana Selekhmeteva (RUS)	Mixed Doubles	Vismane (LAT); Svrčina (CZE); W7-5, 4-6, 11-9	Sato (JPN); Soares Klier Júnior (BRA); W4-6, 7-6, 6-10	Osorio (COL); Mejía (COL); L1-6, 3-6	did not advance	

== Triathlon ==
Spain qualified one athlete based on its performance at the 2018 European Youth Olympic Games Qualifier.

Individual

Athlete	Event	Swim (750m)	Trans 1	Bike (20 km)	Trans 2	Run (5 km)	Total time	Rank
Igor Bellido	Boys' race	9:44	0:30	27:25	0:26	16:38	54:43	6

Relay

Athlete	Event	Total times per athlete (Swim 250m, Bike 6.6 km, Run 1.8 km)	Total group time	Rank
Europe 3 Marie Horn (GER); Henry Graf (GER); Emilie Noyer (FRA); Igor Bellido Mikhailova (ESP)	Mixed relay	23:39 (12); 20:42 (2); 23:13 (3); 21:25 (3)	1:28:59	3rd place, bronze medalist(s)

== Weightlifting ==
Spain qualified one athlete based on its performance at the 2018 European Youth Championships, and was reallocated in the men's event.

Athlete	Event	Snatch		Clean & jerk		Total	Rank
Athlete	Event	Result	Rank	Result	Rank	Total	Rank
José David Perales	Boys' 56 kg	88	5	110	5	198	5
Irene Blanco	Girls' +63 kg	83	5	103	6	186	5
