= Tadeo Marcucci =

Argentine field hockey player

Personal information
- Born: 3 May 2001 (age 25) Buenos Aires, Argentina

Sport
- Sport: Field hockey
- Position: Defence
Senior career
Years	Team	Caps	Goals
–	Lomas	-	-
National team
Years	Team	Caps	Goals
2021	Argentina U–21	6	(0)
2022–	Argentina	32	(1)
Medal record
Men's field hockey
Representing Argentina
World Cup
Bronze medal – third place	2026 Wavre/Amstelveen
Pan American Games
Gold medal – first place	2023 Santiago	Team
Pan American Cup
Gold medal – first place	2025 Montevideo
South American Games
Gold medal – first place	2022 Asunción	Team
FIH Junior World Cup
Gold medal – first place	2021 Bhubaneswar	Team
Youth Olympic Games
Bronze medal – third place	2018 Buenos Aires	Team

Tadeo Marcucci (born 3 May 2001) is an Argentine field hockey player.

In 2024, he will represent Argentina at the XXXIII Summer Olympics in France.

== Early life ==
Tadeo Marcucci was born on 3 May 2001, in Buenos Aires, Argentina.

== Career ==
=== Under–21 ===
Marcucci made his international debut at under-21 level, making his first appearance in 2021. He debuted for the Argentine U–21 team at the FIH Junior World Cup in Bhubaneswar, where he won a gold medal.

=== Los Leones ===
Marcucci received his first call-up to the Los Leones squad in 2022. He made his senior international debut during season three of the FIH Pro League. Later in the year he won his first medal with the senior team, taking home gold at the South American Games in Asunción.

In 2023, Marcucci won his second medal with the national team, winning gold at the Pan American Games in Santiago.

On 7 June 2024, he was named in the national squad for the XXXIII Summer Olympics in Paris.
