= Murilo Sartori =

Brazilian swimmer (born 2002)

Personal information
- Full name: Murilo Setin Sartori
- Nationality: Brazilian
- Born: 18 May 2002 (age 24) Americana, São Paulo, Brazil
- Height: 181 cm (5 ft 11 in)
- Weight: 71 kg (157 lb)

Sport
- Sport: Swimming
- Strokes: freestyle
- Club: Natacao Americana Swim Club; Brazilian National Team
- College team: University of Louisville
- Coach: Fabio Cremonez (Natacao Americana); Arthur Albiero (Louisville)
Medal record
Representing Brazil
World Championships (SC)
Bronze medal – third place	2021 Abu Dhabi	4×200 m freestyle
Pan American Games
Gold medal – first place	2023 Santiago	4×200 m freestyle
Bronze medal – third place	2023 Santiago	200 m freestyle
South American Championships
Gold medal – first place	2021 Buenos Aires	400 m freestyle
Gold medal – first place	2021 Buenos Aires	4×200 m freestyle
Youth Olympic Games
Silver medal – second place	2018 Buenos Aires	4×100 m freestyle
World Junior Championships
Bronze medal – third place	2019 Budapest	200 m freestyle

Murilo Setin Sartori (born 18 May 2002) is a Brazilian swimmer who competed for the University of Louisville, and was an Olympic participant for Brazil in the 2020 Tokyo and 2024 Paris Olympics in the 200-meter freestyle and 200-meter freestyle relay events.

== Early swimming ==
Satori was born in Americana, Brazil, São Paulo, to Tatiane and Glauber Sartori. As he matured as a swimmer, he trained and competed primarily for São Paulo's Natacao Americana Swim Club and was coached by Fabio Cremonez as part of the Brazilian National Team. At the age of 16, participating in the 2018 Summer Youth Olympics in Buenos Aires, he won a silver medal in the Boys' 4 × 100 metre freestyle relay. He also finished 6th at the Boys' 200 metre freestyle. At the age of 17, he won a bronze medal in the 200 metre freestyle at the 2019 FINA World Junior Swimming Championships.

== University of Louisville ==
He competed and trained in college for the University of Louisville from around 2021-2025 under Head Coach Arthur Albiero, though he had competed in the 2020 Olympics as an underclassman. At Louisville, he was a business major. As a Louisville Senior at the NCAA Championships in Indianapolis, he captured All-American honors in the 200 free, with a time of 1:32.18 and again earned All-American honors in the 800 freestyle relay with a seventh-place finish after his team recorded a combined time of 6:08.32. He earned honorable mention All-American honors in the 400 free relay with a 15th place finish, recording a combined time of 2:48.55.

== Olympics, 2020-2024 ==
He competed in the men's 200 metre freestyle at the 2020 Summer Olympics at age 19, finishing in 24th place with a time of 1:47.11, around three seconds behind bronze medalist and teammate Fernando Scheffer of Brazil. He recorded a time of 1:47.11, finishing in 24th place overall. At the 2020 Olympics, Sartori also competed in the Men's 4 × 200 metre freestyle relay final, making the final heat and finishing in 8th place with a combined team time of 7:08.22.

He qualified for the 2024 Paris Olympic team for Brazil where he swam the leadoff on the 4x200M Relay and set a personal split of 1:48.56 as Brazil recorded a combined time of 7:10.26 in the preliminary heats.

== World championships 2021-2022 ==
At the 2021 FINA World Swimming Championships (25 m) in Abu Dhabi, United Arab Emirates, in the Men's 4 × 200 metre freestyle relay, the Brazilian relay, composed of Sartori, Fernando Scheffer, Kaique Alves and Breno Correia, again obtained a medal, now bronze, maintaining the good performance of 2018, when Brazil won the gold beating the world record. He also finished 10th in the Men's 200 metre freestyle.

At the 2022 World Aquatics Championships held in Budapest, Hungary, in the men's 4 × 200 metre freestyle relay event, the Brazilian team, composed by Sartori, Fernando Scheffer, Vinicius Assunção and Breno Correia, broke the South American record twice, first in the heats, and then in the finals, setting the record time of 7:04.69 and obtaining an unprecedented fourth place in the long-distance World Championships. The Brazilian team were unable to medal as a result of the exceptional performance of British team member Tom Dean who closed rapidly while swimming as anchor for the British team.
