= Ignacio Ibarra =

Argentine field hockey player

Personal information
- Born: 7 May 2000 (age 26) Quilmes, Argentina
- Height: 167 cm (5 ft 6 in)
- Weight: 65 kg (143 lb)

Sport
- Sport: Field hockey
- Position: Midfield
- Club: Club Atlético Ducilo
National team
Years	Team	Caps	Goals
2020–2021	Argentina U–21	6	(1)
2022–	Argentina	15	(6)
Medal record
Men's field hockey
Representing Argentina
World Cup
Bronze medal – third place	2026 Wavre/Amstelveen
FIH Junior World Cup
Gold medal – first place	2021 Bhubaneswar	Team
Youth Olympic Games
Bronze medal – third place	2018 Buenos Aires	Team
South American Games
Gold medal – first place	2022 Asunción	Team

Ignacio Ibarra (born 7 May 2000) is an Argentine field hockey player.

== Early life ==
Ignacio Ibarra was born and raised in Quilmes, a suburb of Greater Buenos Aires, Argentina.

== Career ==
=== Under–18 ===
Ibarra made his first international appearances for Argentina at under–18 level. He was a member of the national squad at the 2018 Youth Olympic Games in Buenos Aires. He helped the team to a bronze medal during the tournament.

=== Under–21 ===
Following his youth debut, Ibarra did not represent Argentina again until 2021, when he appeared in the Argentine U–21 squad for the first time. He was a member of the team at the FIH Junior World Cup held in Bhubaneswar. At the tournament, he won a gold medal.

=== Los Leones ===
In 2022, Ibarra received his first call-up to the Los Leones squad. He made his senior international debut at the South American Games in Asunción, where he won a gold medal.

Since his debut in 2022, Ibarra has been included in national squads intermittently. He has most recently appeared in seasons five and six of the FIH Pro League. He also remains a permanent member in the national squad.

==== International goals ====
Goal	Date	Location	Opponent	Score	Result	Competition	Ref.
1	3 October 2022	Parque Olímpico, Asunción, Paraguay	Uruguay	1–0	17–0	XXII South American Games	
2	3 October 2022	Parque Olímpico, Asunción, Paraguay	Uruguay	7–0	17–0	XXII South American Games	
3	3 October 2022	Parque Olímpico, Asunción, Paraguay	Uruguay	16–0	17–0	XXII South American Games	
4	5 October 2022	Parque Olímpico, Asunción, Paraguay	Peru	6–0	17–0	XXII South American Games	
5	9 October 2022	Parque Olímpico, Asunción, Paraguay	Brazil	2–0	12–0	XXII South American Games	
6	9 October 2022	Parque Olímpico, Asunción, Paraguay	Brazil	10–0	12–0	XXII South American Games	
