= Keisuke Yoshida (swimmer) =

Japanese swimmer

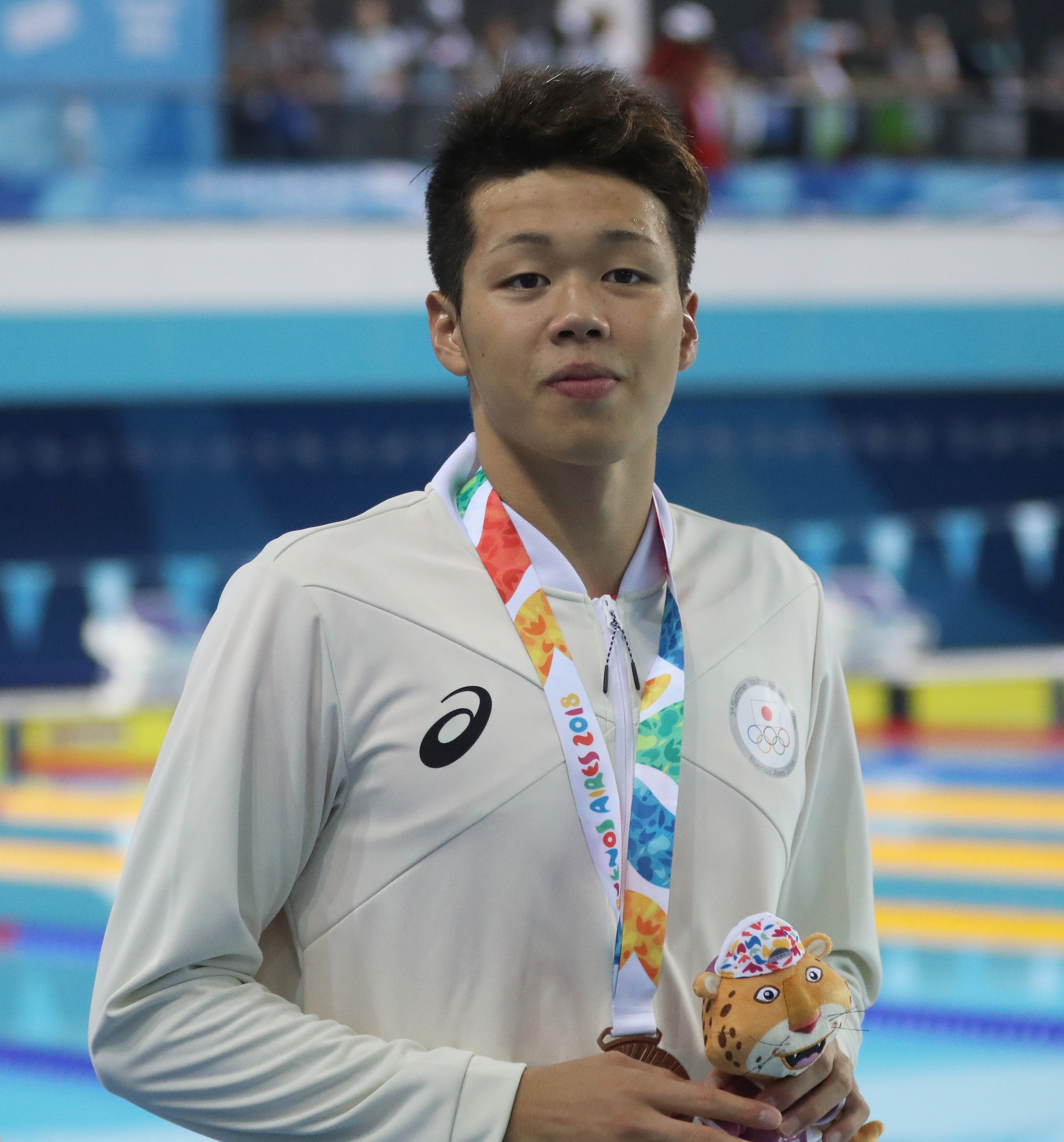
- Keisuke Yoshida in 2018

Personal information
- Born: 17 April 2000 (age 26)

Sport
- Sport: Swimming
Medal record
Men's swimming
Representing Japan
Summer Youth Olympics
Silver medal – second place	2018 Buenos Aires	800 m freestyle
Bronze medal – third place	2018 Buenos Aires	400 m freestyle
Summer Universiade
Gold medal – first place	2019 Naples	400 m freestyle

Keisuke Yoshida (吉田 啓祐, Yoshida Keisuke; born 17 April 2000) is a Japanese swimmer. In 2019, he represented Japan at the 2019 World Aquatics Championships held in Gwangju, South Korea. He competed in the men's 4 × 200 metre freestyle relay event.

In 2018, he represented Japan at the 2018 Summer Youth Olympics in Buenos Aires, Argentina. In the boys' 400 metre freestyle event he won the bronze medal and in the boys' 800 metre freestyle event he won the silver medal. In 2019, he won the gold medal in the men's 400 metre freestyle event at the 2019 Summer Universiade in Naples, Italy.
