= James Collins (field hockey) =

Australian field hockey player

Craig Collins
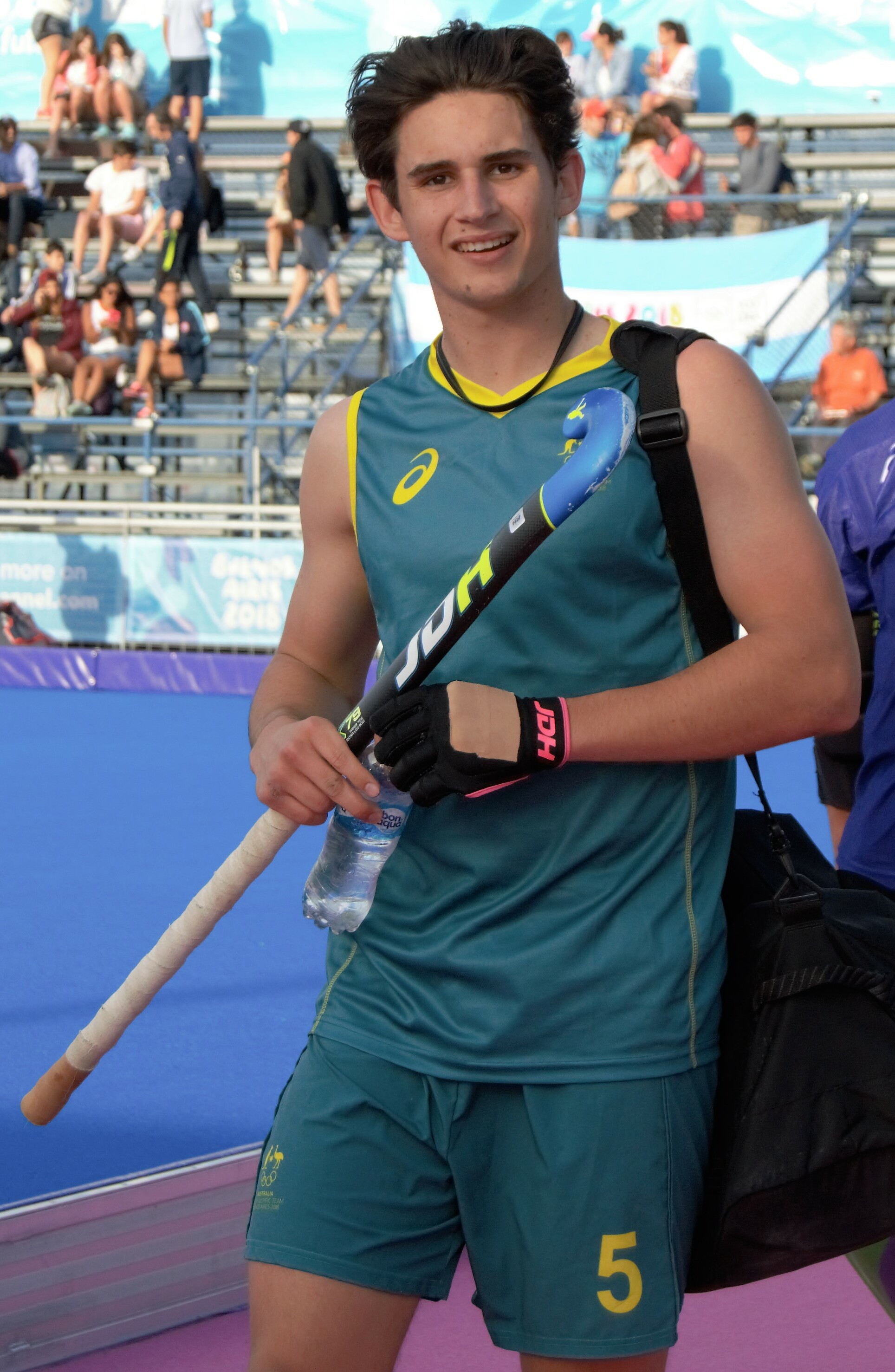
- 2018 Summer Youth Olympics – IND-AUS

Personal information
- Full name: James Haydn Tasman Collins
- Born: 25 February 2000 (age 26) Perth, Western Australia

Sport
- Sport: Field hockey
- Position: Defender
Senior career
Years	Team	Caps	Goals
2019–	Perth Thundersticks	-	-
National team
Years	Team	Caps	Goals
2018	Australia U–18	15	(19)
2022–	Australia	4	(0)
Medal record
Men's field hockey
Representing Australia
Oceania Cup
Gold medal – first place	2025 Darwin

James Haydn Tasman Collins (born 25 February 2000) is a field hockey player from Australia, who plays as a defender.

== Personal life ==
James Collins was born and raised in Perth, Western Australia.

== Career ==
=== Domestic hockey ===
In 2019, Collins was a member of the Perth Thundersticks team for the inaugural season of the Sultana Bran Hockey One League.

=== National teams ===
==== Under–18 ====
James Collins made his debut for Australia in 2018, where he was a member of the Under–18 team at the Oceania Youth Championship in Port Moresby. Later that year he captained the team at the Youth Olympics in Buenos Aires.

==== Kookaburras ====
In 2022, Collins was named in the Kookaburras squad for the first time. In April of that year, he made his senior international debut in a test series against Malaysia in Perth.
