= Rugby sevens at the 2018 Summer Youth Olympics – Boys' tournament =

2018 Summer Youth Olympics
Tournament details
- Host: Argentina
- Venue: Club Atlético San Isidro
- Date: 13–15 October
- Teams: 6

Tournament statistics
- Matches played: 18

The boys' tournament at the 2018 Summer Youth Olympics was held at the Club Atlético San Isidro from 13 to 15 October 2018.

== Group stage ==
All times are Argentina Time (UTC–3).

Pos	Team	Pld	W	D	L	PF	PA	PD	Pts
1	Argentina	5	5	0	0	180	38	+142	15
2	France	5	4	0	1	111	65	+46	13
3	Japan	5	2	1	2	74	103	−29	10
4	South Africa	5	2	0	3	79	84	−5	9
5	United States	5	0	2	3	67	120	−53	7
6	Samoa	5	0	1	4	48	149	−101	6

Source: Buenos Aires 2018
Rules for classification: 1) Points; 2) Head-to-head result; 3) Point difference; 4) Points scored.

13 October 2018
13:15

South Africa	12–14	Japan
Try: Maubane 3'c Kellerman 7'm Con: Hattingh (1/2) 3'	Report	Try: Nakanishi 6'c Konishi 11'c Con: Yamada (2/2) 7', 12'

Club Atlético San Isidro, Buenos Aires
Referee: Nehuen Jauri Rivero (Argentina)

13 October 2018
13:40

United States	0–38	France
	Report	Try: Vili 1'm Trouabal 3'c Germain 5'c Louvet (2) 6'c, 8'c Dridi 12'm Con: Germain (3/4) 4', 5', 7'; Bellot (1/2) 8'

Club Atlético San Isidro, Buenos Aires
Referee: Damián Schneider (Argentina)

13 October 2018
14:15

Argentina	50–7	Samoa
Try: Costa 2'c Mendy 4'm Quetglas 5'c Roger 7'm Moneta (2) 8'c, 14'c Graziano 10'c Hernández 11'm Con: Roger (3/5) 3', 5', 9'; Elicagaray (2/3) 10', 14'	Report	Try: Tuitama 1'c Con: Sepulona (1/1) 1'

Club Atlético San Isidro, Buenos Aires
Referee: Paulo Duarte (Portugal)

13 October 2018
16:20

South Africa	12–17	France
Try: Manyike 6'c Zwelendaba 11'm Con: Manyike (1/1) 6'; Rose (0/1)	Report	Try: Trouabal (2) 1'm, 7'c Dridi 3'm Con: Germain (1/3) 7'

Club Atlético San Isidro, Buenos Aires
Referee: Paulo Duarte (Portugal)

13 October 2018
16:45

United States	24–24	Samoa
Try: Al-Jiboori (2) 0'c, 3'm Waqavesi (2) 10'c, 12'm Con: Mahe (1/2) 1'; Rodriguez (1/2) 10'	Report	Try: Onosai 4'm Ionatana (2) 6'c, 7'c Tusigaigoa 7'c Con: Sepulona (2/4) 6', 7'

Club Atlético San Isidro, Buenos Aires
Referee: Nehuen Jauri Rivero (Argentina)

13 October 2018
17:10

Argentina	45–0	Japan
Try: Cinti Luna (2) 2'c, 9'c Vanni 4'm González 6'c Mendy 8'c Graziano 11'm Moneta 13'c Con: Roger (2/3) 3', 6'; Elicagaray (3/4) 8', 9', 13'	Report

Club Atlético San Isidro, Buenos Aires
Referee: Francisco González (Uruguay)

14 October 2018
9:15

South Africa	19–12	United States
Try: Grobbelaar 4'c Pretorius 7'c Manyike 14'm Con: Hattingh (1/1) 4'; Rose (1/2) 8'	Report	Try: Mahe 1'c Kruse 11'm Con: Mahe (1/1) 2'; Rodriguez (0/1)

Club Atlético San Isidro, Buenos Aires
Referee: Francisco González (Uruguay)

14 October 2018
9:40

Argentina	29–12	France
Try: Vanni 0'c Moneta (2) 4'm, 13'm Costa 5'c Mendy 14'm Con: Roger (2/3) 1', 6'; Elicagaray (0/2)	Report	Try: Randle 7'c Trouabal 10'm Con: Germain (1/1) 7'; Tiberghein (0/1)

Club Atlético San Isidro, Buenos Aires
Referee: Paulo Duarte (Portugal)

14 October 2018
10:05

Japan	29–0	Samoa
Try: Fujii (3) 0'm, 1'm, 4'c Konishi 10'c Nakanishi 13'm Con: Yamada (2/5) 5', 10'	Report

Club Atlético San Isidro, Buenos Aires
Referee: Damián Schneider (Argentina)

14 October 2018
12:20

South Africa	5–34	Argentina
Try: Gumede 12'm Con: Rose (0/1)	Report	Try: Mendy (2) 3'm, 5'm Moneta 6'c Costa 8'm Elicagaray 10'c González 14'm Con: Elicagaray (2/4) 7', 10'; Roger (0/2)

Club Atlético San Isidro, Buenos Aires
Referee: Francisco González (Uruguay)

14 October 2018
12:45

United States	17–17	Japan
Try: Sione 3'c Kruse 10'm Green 13'm Con: Sione (1/3) 3'	Report	Try: Konishi 4'c Nakanashi 6'm Yamada 8'm Con: Konishi (1/1) 5'; Ishida (0/1); Uemura (0/1)

Club Atlético San Isidro, Buenos Aires
Referee: Nehuen Jauri Rivero (Argentina)

14 October 2018
13:10

France	15–10	Samoa
Try: Peysson 1'm Trouabal 8'm Dulon 14'm Con: Germain (0/1); Tiberghien (0/1); Bellot (0/1)	Report	Try: Tuitama 2'm Fuiono 7'm Con: Sepulona (0/2)

Club Atlético San Isidro, Buenos Aires
Referee: Damián Schneider (Argentina)

15 October 2018
11:05

South Africa	31–7	Samoa
Try: Hattingh 1'c Rose 7'; Pretorius 7'm Kellerman 9'c Manyike 11'm Con: Hattingh (1/1) 2'; Rose (2/4) 7', 10'	Report	Try: Lonetona Tautala 5'; Con: Sepulona (1/1) 5'

Club Atlético San Isidro, Buenos Aires
Referee: Nehuen Jauri Rivero (Argentina)

15 October 2018
11:30

United States	14–22	Argentina
Try: Cleary 6'c Kruse 8'c Con: Kruse (2/2) 7', 8'	Report	Try: Vanni 3'c Pedemonte 11'm Graziano 12'm Mendy 14'm Con: Elicagaray (1/2) 4'; Roger (0/2)

Club Atlético San Isidro, Buenos Aires
Referee: Francisco González (Uruguay)

15 October 2018
11:55

France	29–14	Japan
Try: Dridi 1'c Dulon 4'm Randle 6'c Trouabal 11'm Tani 13'm Con: Bellot (1/2) 2'; Tiberghien (1/2) 7'; Germain (0/1)	Report	Try: Konishi 3'c Fujii 9'c Con: Konishi (1/1) 4'; Yamada (1/1) 9'

Club Atlético San Isidro, Buenos Aires
Referee: Paulo Duarte (Portugal)

== Placement rounds ==
=== Fifth place game ===
15 October 2018
11:55

United States	24–14	Samoa
Try: Mahe 7'c Neff 9'c Green 12'm Rodriguez 14'm Con: Kruse (2/4) 7', 9'	Report	Try: Ionatona (2) 0'c, 5'c Con: Sepulona (2/2) 1', 6'

Club Atlético San Isidro, Buenos Aires
Referee: Nehuen Jauri Rivero (Argentina)

=== Bronze medal game ===
15 October 2018
15:10

Japan	28–5	South Africa
Try: Fujii 2'c Nakanishi 3'c Konishi (2) 8'c, 12'c Con: Konishi (4/4) 2', 3', 9', 12'	Report	Try: Maubane 13'm Con: Braude (0/1)

Club Atlético San Isidro, Buenos Aires
Referee: Damián Schneider (Argentina)

=== Gold medal game ===
15 October 2018
16:00

Argentina	24–14	France
Try: Mendy 0'm Cinti Luna 2'c Roger 4'c Costa 12'm Con: Roger (2/4) 2', 5'	Report	Try: Trouabal (2) 9'c, 10'c Con: Germain (1/1) 9', 10'

Club Atlético San Isidro, Buenos Aires
Referee: Paulo Duarte (Portugal)

== Final ranking ==
Rank	Team
1st place, gold medalist(s)	Argentina
2nd place, silver medalist(s)	France
3rd place, bronze medalist(s)	Japan
4	South Africa
5	United States
6	Samoa

== See also ==
- Rugby sevens at the 2018 Summer Youth Olympics – Girls' tournament
