= United States at the 2018 Summer Youth Olympics =

- IOC code: USA
- NOC: United States Olympic Committee
- Website: https://www.teamusa.com

in Buenos Aires, Argentina 6 – 18 October 2018
- Competitors: 86 in 22 sports
- Flag bearers: Alex Cleary (opening); Grace Stark (closing)
- Medals Ranked 8th: Gold 6 Silver 5 Bronze 7 Total 18

Summer Youth Olympics appearances (overview)
- 2010; 2014; 2018; 2026

The United States participated at the 2018 Summer Youth Olympics in Buenos Aires, Argentina from 6 October to 18 October 2018.

== Archery ==
The United States qualified two archers based on its performance at the 2017 World Archery Youth Championships.

Individual

Athlete	Event	Ranking round		Round of 32	Round of 16	Quarterfinals	Semifinals	Final / BM	Rank
Athlete	Event	Score	Seed	Opposition Score	Opposition Score	Opposition Score	Opposition Score	Opposition Score	Rank
Trenton Cowles	Boys' Individual	665	15	de Carvalho Almeida (BRA); W 6–0	Tang (TPE); W 7–1	Shabani (IRI); W 6–0	Ovchynnikov (UKR); W 6–0	Akash (IND); W 6–0	1st place, gold medalist(s)
Catalina GNoriega	Girls' Individual	642	14	Bassi (CHI); W 6–5	Himani (IND); W 6–4	Canales (ESP); L 3–7	Did not advance		5

Team

Athletes	Event	Ranking round		Round of 32	Round of 16	Quarterfinals	Semifinals	Final / BM	Rank
Athletes	Event	Score	Seed	Opposition Score	Opposition Score	Opposition Score	Opposition Score	Opposition Score	Rank
Trenton Cowles (USA); Quinn Reddig (NAM)	Mixed team	1299	18	Voropayeva (KAZ); Benítez (PAR); W 6–0	Vázquez Cadena (MEX); Mustafin (KAZ); W 6–2	Kang (PRK); Vaca Cordero (MEX); W 6–2	Touraine-Helias (FRA); Solera (ESP); L 3–5	Jones (NZL); Tang (TPE); W 5–3	3rd place, bronze medalist(s)
Catalina GNoriega (USA); Hazael Jesus Rodríguez Valero (CUB)	Mixed team	1302	7	Kang (PRK); Vaca Cordero (MEX); L 0–6	Did not advance				17

== Badminton ==
The United States qualified one player based on the Badminton Junior World Rankings.

Singles

Athlete	Event	Group stage				Quarterfinal	Semifinal	Final / BM	Rank
Athlete	Event	Opposition Score	Opposition Score	Opposition Score	Rank	Opposition Score	Opposition Score	Opposition Score	Rank
Jennie Gai	Girls' Singles	Saponara Rivva (PER); W (21–10, 21–7)	Vaishnavi Reddy (IND); W (21–18, 23–21)	Andreu (ESP); W (21–10, 22–20)	1Q	Hooi (SGP); L (16–21, 18–21)	Did not advance		5

Team

Athlete	Event	Group stage				Quarterfinal	Semifinal	Final / BM	Rank
Athlete	Event	Opposition Score	Opposition Score	Opposition Score	Rank	Opposition Score	Opposition Score	Opposition Score	Rank
Team Alpha; Jennie Gai (USA); Lakshya Sen (IND); Giovanni Toti (ITA); Vannthoun Vath (CAM); Brian Yang (CAN); Hasini Nusaka Ambalangodage (SRI); Maria Delcheva (BUL); Ashwathi Pillai (SWE)	Mixed Teams	Epsilon (MIX); W (110–98)	Delta (MIX); L (99–110)	Zeta (MIX); W (110–103)	2 Q	Gamma (MIX); W (110–94)	Theta (MIX); W (110–90)	Omega (MIX); W (110–106)	1st place, gold medalist(s)

== Basketball ==
The United States qualified a girls' team based on its performance at the 2017 FIBA 3x3 U18 World Cup. The United States later qualified a boys' team based on the U18 3x3 National Federation Ranking.

- Boys' tournament - 1 team of 4 athletes
- Girls' tournament - 1 team of 4 athletes

Event	Group stage					Quarterfinal	Semifinal	Final / BM	
Event	Opposition Score	Opposition Score	Opposition Score	Opposition Score	Rank	Opposition Score	Opposition Score	Opposition Score	Rank
Boys' tournament	Estonia; L 14–21	Russia; L 16–18	Mongolia; W 21–19	Argentina; W 21–18	4	Did not advance			
Girls' tournament	Venezuela; W 21–9	Sri Lanka; W 21–8	Egypt; W 21–4	Ukraine; W 21–9	1	Netherlands; W 18–14	China; W 21–9	France; W 18–4	1st place, gold medalist(s)

Shoot-out contest

Athlete	Event	Qualification		Final	
Athlete	Event	Points	Rank	Total	Rank
Paige Bueckers	Shoot-out contest	7	4	8	4
Samantha Brunelle	Shoot-out contest	5	7	Did not advance	

Skills Competition

Athlete	Event	Qualification		Final	
Athlete	Event	Points	Rank	Points	Rank
Carson McCorkle	Boys' Dunk Contest	50	2	47	4

== Beach volleyball ==
The United States qualified a girls' team based on their performance at the 2018 Central Zone U19 Championship.

- Girls' tournament - 1 team of 2 athletes

Athletes	Event	Preliminary round		Round of 24	Round of 16	Quarterfinals	Semifinals	Final / BM	
Athletes	Event	Opposition Score	Rank	Opposition Score	Opposition Score	Opposition Score	Opposition Score	Opposition Score	Rank
Devon Newberry; Lindsey Sparks	Girls'	Baumann–Betschart (SUI); W 2–0; Tiaan–Lauren (AUS); W 2–0; Churin–Villar (ARG); W 2–0	1	Bye	Allcca–Mendoza (PER); W 2–0	Álvarez M.–Moreno (ESP); W 2–1	Scampoli–Bertozzi (ITA); L 0–2	Olimstad–Berntsen (NOR); L 1–2	4
Timothy Brewster; John Schwengel	Boys' tournament	Bintang–Danang (INA); L 0-2; Gabo–Osório (VEN); W 2-0; Railbiently–Brian (ARU); W 2-0	2	João Pedro–Gabriel (BRA); W 2-0	Gysin–Broch (SUI); W 2-0	de Groot–Immers (NED); L	Did not advance		

== Boxing ==
Boys

Athlete	Event	Preliminary R1	Preliminary R2	Semifinals	Final / RM	Rank
Athlete	Event	Opposition Result	Opposition Result	Opposition Result	Opposition Result	Rank
Otha Jones III	-64 kg	Azim (GBR); L 1–4	Popov (RUS); L 2-3	Did not advance	Maliqi (KOS); NC	5

Girls

Athlete	Event	Preliminaries	Semifinals	Final / RM	Rank
Athlete	Event	Opposition Result	Opposition Result	Opposition Result	Rank
Heaven Destiny Garcia	-51 kg	Abdraimova (KAZ); W 3–2	La Piana (ITA); L 4–1	Stoeva (BUL); W 5–0	3rd place, bronze medalist(s)
Roma Martinez	-57 kg	Rooney (IRL); L 0–5	Did not advance		5

== Canoeing ==
The United States qualified three boats based on its performance at the 2018 World Qualification Event.

- Boys' K1 - 1 boat
- Girls' C1 - 1 boat
- Girls' K1 - 1 boat

Athlete	Event	Qualification		Repechage		Last 16	Quarterfinals	Semifinals	Final / BM	Rank
Athlete	Event	Time	Rank	Time	Rank	Opposition Result	Opposition Result	Opposition Result	Opposition Result	Rank
Robert Healy	Boys' K1 sprint	2:09.24	15	2:09.11	10	—N/a	Did not advance			
Robert Healy	Boys' K1 slalom	1:17.00	7	1:19.15	6	—N/a	Did not advance			
Zoe Hein	Girls' C1 sprint	2:44.14	12	2:34.27	2	Guzmán (MEX); L 2:38.67	Did not advance			
Zoe Hein	Girls' C1 slalom	1:36.98	8	Bye		Amusar (NGR); W 1:35.47	Lewandowski (GER); L 1:40.43	Did not advance		
Ria Spibar	Girls' K1 sprint	2:16.09	18	DNF	12	Did not advance				
Ria Spibar	Girls' K1 slalom	1:22.76	5	Bye		Sukhanova (KAZ); W 1:20.44	Tzu-hsuan (TPE); L 1:21.19	Did not advance		

== Diving ==
Athlete	Event	Preliminary		Final	
Athlete	Event	Points	Rank	Points	Rank
Jack Matthews	Boys' 3m springboard	475.15	12	501.15	9
Jack Matthews	Boys' 10m platform	387.60	12	438.25	10
Bridget O'Neil	Girls' 3 m springboard	414.60	5	439.60	3rd place, bronze medalist(s)
Bridget O'Neil (USA); Jack Matthews (USA)	Mixed team	—N/a		263.70	13

== Equestrian ==
The United States qualified a rider based on its performance at the FEI North American Junior Championships.

- Individual Jumping - 1 athlete

Athlete	Horse	Event	Round 1		Round 2			Total		Jump off		
Athlete	Horse	Event	Penalties	Rank	Penalties	Total	Rank	Penalties	Rank	Penalties	Total	Rank
Mattie Hatcher	Santa Rosa Valery	Individual Jumping	0	1	0	0	1	0	1	8	8	4
North America; Nicole Meyer Robredo (MEX); Mateo Philippe Coles (HAI); Marissa del Pilar Thompson (PAN); Pedro Espinosa (HON); Mattie Hatcher (USA)	El Capricho Champion; Quid Du Plessis; Canal Del Bajo Kithira; Llavaneras Genquina; Santa Rosa Valery	Team Jumping	4 # 0; 0; 0; 0 #	0	4 # 0; 0; 4 # 0	0	0	4 # 0 # 0; 0; 0	0	38.07 # 34.55 # 34.07; 32.16; 31.66	97.89	1st place, gold medalist(s)

== Fencing ==
The United States qualified six athletes based on its performance at the 2018 Cadet World Championship.

- Boys' Épée - Isaac Herbst
- Boys' Foil - Kenji Bravo
- Boys' Sabre - Robert Vidovszky
- Girls' Épée - Emily Vermeule
- Girls' Foil - May Tieu
- Girls' Sabre - Alexis Anglade

== Golf ==
Individual

Athlete	Event	Round 1		Round 2			Round 3			Total		
Athlete	Event	Score	Rank	Score	Total	Rank	Score	Total	Rank	Score	Par	Rank
Lucy Li	Girls' Individual	78 (+8)	18	70 (0)	148	2	73 (+3)	221	7	211	+11	8
Akshay Bhatia	Boys' Individual	69 (-1)	1	69 (-1)	138	3	70 (0)	208	4	206	-2	2nd place, silver medalist(s)

Team

Athletes	Event	Round 1 (Fourball)		Round 2 (Foursome)		Round 3 (Individual Stroke)				Total		
Athletes	Event	Score	Rank	Score	Rank	Girl	Boy	Total	Rank	Score	Par	Rank
Lucy Li; Akshay Bhatia	Mixed team	62 (-8)	3	70 (0)	3	71	66	137 (-3)	1	269	-11	2nd place, silver medalist(s)

== Gymnastics ==
=== Artistic ===
The United States qualified two gymnasts based on its performance at the 2018 American Junior Championship.

- Boys' artistic individual all-around - 1 quota
- Girls' artistic individual all-around - 1 quota

=== Rhythmic ===
The United States qualified one gymnast based on its performance at the 2018 American Junior Championship.

- Girls' rhythmic individual all-around - 1 quota

=== Trampoline ===
The United States qualified one gymnast based on its performance at the 2018 American Junior Championship.

- Girls' trampoline - 1 quota

== Roller speed skating ==
The United States qualified two roller skaters based on its performance at the 2018 Roller Speed Skating World Championship.

- Boys' combined speed event - Sabien Tinson
- Girls' combined speed event - Corinne Stoddard

== Rowing ==
The United States qualified two boats based on its performance at the 2017 World Junior Rowing Championships.

- Boys' single sculls - 1 athlete
- Girls' pair – 2 athletes

== Rugby sevens ==
The United States qualified a boys' team based on its performance at the 2018 Americas North qualification tournament, with Canada electing to send its boys' field hockey team instead based on quotas.

Roster

- Tyren Al-Jiboori
- Max Clark
- Alex Cleary
- Lauina Falatea
- Jasper Green
- Isaia Kruse
- Sione Mahe
- Zachary Neff
- Uluamu Niutupuivaha
- Jon Rodriguez
- Inoke Waqavesi
- Ben Wierenga

=== Group stage ===
Pos	Team	Pld	W	D	L	PF	PA	PD	Pts
1	Argentina	5	5	0	0	180	38	+142	15
2	France	5	4	0	1	111	65	+46	13
3	Japan	5	2	1	2	74	103	−29	10
4	South Africa	5	2	0	3	79	84	−5	9
5	United States	5	0	2	3	67	120	−53	7
6	Samoa	5	0	1	4	48	149	−101	6

Source: Buenos Aires 2018
Rules for classification: 1) Points; 2) Head-to-head result; 3) Point difference; 4) Points scored.

13 October 2018
13:40

United States	0–38	France
	Report	Try: Vili 1'm Trouabal 3'c Germain 5'c Louvet (2) 6'c, 8'c Dridi 12'm Con: Germain (3/4) 4', 5', 7'; Bellot (1/2) 8'

Club Atlético San Isidro, Buenos Aires
Referee: Damián Schneider (Argentina)

13 October 2018
16:45

United States	24–24	Samoa
Try: Al-Jiboori (2) 0'c, 3'm Waqavesi (2) 10'c, 12'm Con: Mahe (1/2) 1'; Rodriguez (1/2) 10'	Report	Try: Onosai 4'm Ionatana (2) 6'c, 7'c Tusigaigoa 7'c Con: Sepulona (2/4) 6', 7'

Club Atlético San Isidro, Buenos Aires
Referee: Nehuen Jauri Rivero (Argentina)

14 October 2018
9:15

South Africa	19–12	United States
Try: Grobbelaar 4'c Pretorius 7'c Manyike 14'm Con: Hattingh (1/1) 4'; Rose (1/2) 8'	Report	Try: Mahe 1'c Kruse 11'm Con: Mahe (1/1) 2'; Rodriguez (0/1)

Club Atlético San Isidro, Buenos Aires
Referee: Francisco González (Uruguay)

14 October 2018
12:45

United States	17–17	Japan
Try: Sione 3'c Kruse 10'm Green 13'm Con: Sione (1/3) 3'	Report	Try: Konishi 4'c Nakanashi 6'm Yamada 8'm Con: Konishi (1/1) 5'; Ishida (0/1); Uemura (0/1)

Club Atlético San Isidro, Buenos Aires
Referee: Nehuen Jauri Rivero (Argentina)

15 October 2018
11:30

United States	14–22	Argentina
Try: Cleary 6'c Kruse 8'c Con: Kruse (2/2) 7', 8'	Report	Try: Vanni 3'c Pedemonte 11'm Graziano 12'm Mendy 14'm Con: Elicagaray (1/2) 4'; Roger (0/2)

Club Atlético San Isidro, Buenos Aires
Referee: Francisco González (Uruguay)

=== Fifth place game ===
15 October 2018
11:55

United States	24–14	Samoa
Try: Mahe 7'c Neff 9'c Green 12'm Rodriguez 14'm Con: Kruse (2/4) 7', 9'	Report	Try: Ionatona (2) 0'c, 5'c Con: Sepulona (2/2) 1', 6'

Club Atlético San Isidro, Buenos Aires
Referee: Nehuen Jauri Rivero (Argentina)

== Sailing ==
The United States qualified one boat based on its performance at the North American and Caribbean Nacra 15 Qualifiers. The nation later qualified two more boats based on their performance at the North American Windsurfing Championship. An IKA Twin Tip boat was qualified through its performance at the 2018 World Championship.

- Boys' Techno 293+ - 1 boat
- Boys' IKA Twin Tip Racing - 1 boat
- Girls' Techno 293+ - 1 boat
- Mixed Nacra 15 - 1 boat

== Sport climbing ==
The United States qualified two sport climbers based on their second-place and third-place finishes in the youth A combined event of the 2017 World Youth Sport Climbing Championships.

- Girls' combined - 2 quotas (Ashima Shiraishi, Brooke Raboutou)

However neither Shiraishi nor Raboutou was included in the final list of starting athletes for the Summer Youth Olympics. The US Olympic Committee declined to allow them to participate, citing a fixed limit on the total number of athletes that it could send to all events, and a low prioritization of the climbing event based on the fact that, as a sport new to the Olympics, USA Climbing had applied for recognition by the USOC but not yet received it.

== Swimming ==
United States qualified eight swimmers.

== Table tennis ==
The United States qualified two table tennis players based on its performance at the North American Continental Qualifier.

- Boys' singles - Kanak Jha
- Girls' singles – Amy Wang

== Taekwondo ==
Athlete	Event	Round of 16	Quarterfinals	Semifinals	Final	
Athlete	Event	Opposition Result	Opposition Result	Opposition Result	Opposition Result	Rank
Sharif Salim	Boys' −48 kg	Bye	Mohamed Khalil Jendoubi (TUN); L 8-11	Did not advance		6
Anastasija Zolotic	Girls' 49 kg	Bye	Rim Bayaa (SWE); W 22-17	Lee Ye-ji (KOR); W 21-11	Elizaveta Ryadninskaya (RUS); L 16-17	2nd place, silver medalist(s)

== Tennis ==
Singles

Athlete	Event	Round of 32	Round of 16	Quarterfinals	Semifinals	Final / BM	
Athlete	Event	Opposition Score	Opposition Score	Opposition Score	Opposition Score	Opposition Score	Rank
Tristan Boyer	Boys' singles	Y Erel (TUR); L (3-6, 6^{9}-7^{11})	Did not advance				
Drew Baird	Boys' singles	P Sydow (ARU); W (6-3, 6^{5}-7^{7}, 6-3)	G Soares Klier Júnior (BRA); L (6-7, 4-6)	Did not advance			
Lea Ma	Girls' singles	K Rakhimova (RUS); L (6-4, 2-6, 1-6)	Did not advance				
Alexa Noel	Girls' singles	D Parry (FRA); L (6^{4}-7^{7}, 3-6)	Did not advance				

Doubles

Athletes	Event	Round of 32	Round of 16	Quarterfinals	Semifinals	Final / BM	
Athletes	Event	Opposition Score	Opposition Score	Opposition Score	Opposition Score	Opposition Score	Rank
Drew Baird (USA); Tristan Boyer (USA)	Boys' doubles	—N/a	N Mejía (COL); G Soares Klier Júnior (BRA); L (3-6, 6-7)	Did not advance			
L Ma (USA); A Noel (USA)	Girls' doubles	—N/a	SȘ Cadar (ROU); L Sun (SUI); L (1-6, 4-6)	Did not advance			
A Noel (USA); T Boyer (USA)	Mixed doubles	I Świątek (POL); D Michalski (POL); L (1-6, 4-6)	Did not advance				
L Ma (USA); D Baird (USA)	Mixed doubles	E Cocciaretto (ITA); L Musetti (ITA); L (5-7, 2-6)	Did not advance				

== Triathlon ==
The United States qualified two athletes based on its performance at the 2018 American Youth Olympic Games Qualifier.

Individual

Athlete	Event	Swim (750m)	Trans 1	Bike (20 km)	Trans 2	Run (5 km)	Total Time	Rank
Andrew Shellenberger	Boys	9:31	0:28	27:41	0:30	16:37	54:47	7
Maryhelen Albright	Girls	-	-	-	-	-	DNF	

Relay

Athlete	Event	Total Times per Athlete (Swim 250m, Bike 6.6 km, Run 1.8 km)	Total Group Time	Rank
Americas 1 Paula Vega (ECU); Cristobal Baeza Muñoz (CHI); Sofia Rodríguez Moreno (MEX); Andrew Shellenberger (USA)	Mixed Relay	22:11 (3) - - -	DNF	
Americas 5 Maryhelen Albright (USA); Giannon Lisandro Eights (ARU); Naomi Espinoza Guablocho (PER); Dominic Pugliese (ISV)	Mixed Relay	22:45 (6); 23:11 (12); 25:15 (10); 24:06 (13)	1:35:17	11

== Weightlifting ==
The United States qualified two athletes based on its performance at the 201? ??? Youth Championships.

Boy

Athlete	Event	Snatch		Clean & jerk		Total	Rank
Athlete	Event	Result	Rank	Result	Rank	Total	Rank
Jerome Anthony Smith	−69 kg	127	3	155	3	282	4

Girl

Athlete	Event	Snatch		Clean & jerk		Total	Rank
Athlete	Event	Result	Rank	Result	Rank	Total	Rank
Peyton Brown	−58 kg	85	3	106	3	186	3rd place, bronze medalist(s)

== Wrestling ==
Key:
- VFA – Victory by Fall
- VSU – Without any points scored by the opponent
- VSU1 – With point(s) scored by the opponent
- VPO – Without any points scored by the opponent
- VPO1 – With point(s) scored by the opponent

Boys

Athlete	Event	Group stage			Final / RM	Rank
Athlete	Event	Opposition Score	Opposition Score	Rank	Opposition Score	Rank
Robert Howard	Boys' freestyle −55kg	Fujita (JPN); W 13 – 2 ^{VSU1}	Ostapenko (UKR); W 10 – 5 ^{VPO1}	1 Q	Almendra (ARG); W 17 – 6 ^{VSU1}	1st place, gold medalist(s)
Carson Taylor Manville	Boys' freestyle −65kg	Ismail (EGY); W 12 – 3 ^{VPO1}	Karimi (IRI); L 0 – 10 ^{VSU}	2 Q	Ullah (PAK); L 2 – 6 ^{VPO1}	4

Girls

Athlete	Event	Group stage					Final / RM	Rank
Athlete	Event	Opposition Score	Opposition Score	Opposition Score	Opposition Score	Rank	Opposition Score	Rank
Emily Shilson	Girls' freestyle −43kg	Vigouroux (FRA); W 5 – 0 ^{VPO}	Martinez (BRA); W 10 – 0 ^{VSU}	Nazarova (AZE); W 12 – 2 ^{VSU1}	Ogunsanya (NGR); W 2 – 0 ^{VFA}	1 Q	Simran (IND); W 11 – 6 ^{VPO1}	1st place, gold medalist(s)
Tiare Lynn Ikei	Girls' freestyle −49kg	Mosquera (VEN); W 12 – 2 ^{VSU1}	Varakina (BLR); L 0 – 6 ^{VPO}	Akhmedova (UZB); L 8 – 9 ^{VFA}	Raimova (KAZ); W 8 – 0 ^{VPO}	3 Q	Szenttamási (HUN); L 0 – 3 ^{VPO}	6
