= Samoa at the 2018 Summer Youth Olympics =

- IOC code: SAM
- NOC: Samoa Association of Sports and National Olympic Committee

in Buenos Aires, Argentina 6 – 18 October 2018
- Competitors: 17 in 4 sports
- Medals: Gold 0 Silver 0 Bronze 0 Total 0

Summer Youth Olympics appearances
- 2010; 2014; 2018

Samoa participated at the 2018 Summer Youth Olympics in Buenos Aires, Argentina from 6 October to 18 October 2018.

== Competitors ==
The following is the list of number of competitors participating at the Games per sport/discipline.

| Sport | Men | Women | Total |
|---|---|---|---|
| Archery | 0 | 1 | 1 |
| Boxing | 3 | 0 | 3 |
| Rugby sevens | 12 | 0 | 12 |
| Weightlifting | 0 | 1 | 1 |
| Total | 15 | 2 | 17 |

== Archery ==
Individual

| Athlete | Event | Ranking round | | Round of 32 | Round of 16 | Quarterfinals | Semifinals | Final / BM | Rank |
| Athlete | Event | Score | Seed | Opposition Score | Opposition Score | Opposition Score | Opposition Score | Opposition Score | Rank |
|---|---|---|---|---|---|---|---|---|---|
| Jil Walter | Girls' Individual | 590 | 30 | Himani (IND); L 1–7 | did not advance | | | | 17 |

Team

| Athletes | Event | Ranking round | | Round of 32 | Round of 16 | Quarterfinals | Semifinals | Final / BM | Rank |
| Athletes | Event | Score | Seed | Opposition Score | Opposition Score | Opposition Score | Opposition Score | Opposition Score | Rank |
|---|---|---|---|---|---|---|---|---|---|
| Jil Walter (SAM); Feng Hao (CHN) | Mixed team | 1278 | 27 | Sliachticas Caetano (BRA); Roos (BEL); L 2–6 | did not advance | | | | 17 |

== Boxing ==
Samoa qualified 3 boys based on its performance at Oceania Boxing Championship in Apia, Samoa.

Boys

| Athlete | Event | Preliminary R1 | Preliminary R2 | Semifinals | Final / RM | Rank |
| Athlete | Event | Opposition Result | Opposition Result | Opposition Result | Opposition Result | Rank |
|---|---|---|---|---|---|---|
| Jancen Poutoa | -75 kg | Jiménez (VEN); W 5–0 | — | Douibi (ALG); L 0–5 | Jongjohor (THA); L 0-5 | 4 |
| Malcolm Matthes | -91 kg | Mikušťák (CZE); L 0–5 | Hacid (ALG); L 0-5 | Did not advance | Salgado (CHI); L 1-4 | 6 |
| Vaisilika Tuigamala | +91 kg | Chuol (CAN); L 0–5 | Toibay (KAZ); L WO | Did not advance | Dennis (AUS); NC | 6 |

== Rugby sevens ==
Group stage

| Pos | Team | Pld | W | D | L | PF | PA | PD | Pts |
|---|---|---|---|---|---|---|---|---|---|
| 1 | Argentina | 5 | 5 | 0 | 0 | 180 | 38 | +142 | 15 |
| 2 | France | 5 | 4 | 0 | 1 | 111 | 65 | +46 | 13 |
| 3 | Japan | 5 | 2 | 1 | 2 | 74 | 103 | −29 | 10 |
| 4 | South Africa | 5 | 2 | 0 | 3 | 79 | 84 | −5 | 9 |
| 5 | United States | 5 | 0 | 2 | 3 | 67 | 120 | −53 | 7 |
| 6 | Samoa | 5 | 0 | 1 | 4 | 48 | 149 | −101 | 6 |

Source: Buenos Aires 2018
Rules for classification: 1) Points; 2) Head-to-head result; 3) Point difference; 4) Points scored.

13 October 2018
14:15

| Argentina | 50–7 | Samoa |
| Try: Costa 2'c Mendy 4'm Quetglas 5'c Roger 7'm Moneta (2) 8'c, 14'c Graziano 10'c Hernández 11'm Con: Roger (3/5) 3', 5', 9'; Elicagaray (2/3) 10', 14' | Report | Try: Tuitama 1'c Con: Sepulona (1/1) 1' |

Club Atlético San Isidro, Buenos Aires
Referee: Paulo Duarte (Portugal)

13 October 2018
16:45

| United States | 24–24 | Samoa |
| Try: Al-Jiboori (2) 0'c, 3'm Waqavesi (2) 10'c, 12'm Con: Mahe (1/2) 1'; Rodriguez (1/2) 10' | Report | Try: Onosai 4'm Ionatana (2) 6'c, 7'c Tusigaigoa 7'c Con: Sepulona (2/4) 6', 7' |

Club Atlético San Isidro, Buenos Aires
Referee: Nehuen Jauri Rivero (Argentina)

14 October 2018
10:05

| Japan | 29–0 | Samoa |
| Try: Fujii (3) 0'm, 1'm, 4'c Konishi 10'c Nakanishi 13'm Con: Yamada (2/5) 5', 10' | Report |

Club Atlético San Isidro, Buenos Aires
Referee: Damián Schneider (Argentina)

14 October 2018
13:10

| France | 15–10 | Samoa |
| Try: Peysson 1'm Trouabal 8'm Dulon 14'm Con: Germain (0/1); Tiberghien (0/1); Bellot (0/1) | Report | Try: Tuitama 2'm Fuiono 7'm Con: Sepulona (0/2) |

Club Atlético San Isidro, Buenos Aires
Referee: Damián Schneider (Argentina)

15 October 2018
11:05

| South Africa | 31–7 | Samoa |
| Try: Hattingh 1'c Rose 7'; Pretorius 7'm Kellerman 9'c Manyike 11'm Con: Hattingh (1/1) 2'; Rose (2/4) 7', 10' | Report | Try: Lonetona Tautala 5'; Con: Sepulona (1/1) 5' |

Club Atlético San Isidro, Buenos Aires
Referee: Nehuen Jauri Rivero (Argentina)

=== Fifth place game ===
15 October 2018
11:55

| United States | 24–14 | Samoa |
| Try: Mahe 7'c Neff 9'c Green 12'm Rodriguez 14'm Con: Kruse (2/4) 7', 9' | Report | Try: Ionatona (2) 0'c, 5'c Con: Sepulona (2/2) 1', 6' |

Club Atlético San Isidro, Buenos Aires
Referee: Nehuen Jauri Rivero (Argentina)

== Weightlifting ==
Samoa was given a quota by the tripartite committee to compete in weightlifting.

| Athlete | Event | Snatch | | Clean & jerk | | Total | Rank |
| Athlete | Event | Result | Rank | Result | Rank | Total | Rank |
|---|---|---|---|---|---|---|---|
| Lesila Fiapule | Girls' +63 kg | NM | | DNF | | | |
