= South Africa at the 2018 Summer Youth Olympics =

- IOC code: RSA
- NOC: South African Sports Confederation and Olympic Committee
- Website: www.sascoc.co.za

in Buenos Aires, Argentina 6 – 18 October 2018
- Competitors: 75 in 20 sports
- Medals Ranked 25th: Gold 3 Silver 1 Bronze 1 Total 5

Summer Youth Olympics appearances
- 2010; 2014; 2018; 2026

South Africa participated at the 2018 Summer Youth Olympics in Buenos Aires, Argentina from 6 October to 18 October 2018.

== Archery ==
Individual

Athlete	Event	Ranking round		Round of 32	Round of 16	Quarterfinals	Semifinals	Final / BM	Rank
Athlete	Event	Score	Seed	Opposition Score	Opposition Score	Opposition Score	Opposition Score	Opposition Score	Rank
Wian Roux	Boys' Individual	609	30	Feng (CHN); L 0–6	did not advance				17

Team

Athletes	Event	Ranking round		Round of 32	Round of 16	Quarterfinals	Semifinals	Final / BM	Rank
Athletes	Event	Score	Seed	Opposition Score	Opposition Score	Opposition Score	Opposition Score	Opposition Score	Rank
Wian Roux (RSA); Himani Himani (IND)	Mixed team	1274	29	Tromans-Ansell (GBR) / Shabani (IRI); L 1–5	did not advance				17

== Canoeing ==
South Africa qualified two boats based on its performance at the 2018 World Qualification Event.

- Boys' K1 - 1 boat
- Girls' K1 - 1 boat

Boys

Athlete	Event	Qualification		Repechage		Quarterfinals	Semifinals	Final / BM	Rank
Athlete	Event	Time	Rank	Time	Rank	Opposition Result	Opposition Result	Opposition Result	Rank
Pierre Thomas van der Westhuyzen	K1 sprint	1:45.58	8	1:45.78	3	Valentin Rossi (ARG); L 1:46.22	did not advance		
Pierre Thomas van der Westhuyzen	K1 slalom	DNF		—N/a		did not advance			

Girls

Athlete	Event	Qualification		Repechage		Quarterfinals	Semifinals	Final / BM	Rank
Athlete	Event	Time	Rank	Time	Rank	Opposition Result	Opposition Result	Opposition Result	Rank
Lizanne Conradie	K1 sprint	2:05.30	14	2:05.64	5	Adela Házová (CZE); L 2:07.95	did not advance		
Lizanne Conradie	K1 slalom	1:27.57	13	1:32.01	8	Pornnapphan Phuangmaiming (THA); L 1:26.06	did not advance		

== Dancesport ==
South Africa qualified one dancer based on its performance at the 2018 World Youth Breaking Championship.

- B-Boys - Jordan Smith

== Equestrian ==
South Africa qualified a rider based on its ranking in the FEI World Jumping Challenge Rankings.

- Individual Jumping - 1 athlete

Athlete	Horse	Event	Round 1		Round 2			Total	
Athlete	Horse	Event	Penalties	Rank	Penalties	Total	Rank	Penalties	Rank
Hannah Ivy Garton	Jos Cassius	Individual Jumping	16	25	4	4	10	20	25
Africa; Margaux Koenig (MRI); Anna Bunty Howard (ZAM); Brianagh Lindsay Clark (ZIM); Ahmed Nasser Elnaggar (EGY); Hannah Ivy Garton (RSA)	BM Urlefe; Call Girl Z El Roblecito Malaika; Jos Africa de Parco; Jos Cassius	Team Jumping	(4); 1; 0 (8); 0	4	(4); 0; 0 (4); 0	1	1	1	3rd place, bronze medalist(s)

== Golf ==
Individual

Athlete	Event	Round 1		Round 2			Round 3			Total		
Athlete	Event	Score	Rank	Score	Total	Rank	Score	Total	Rank	Score	Par	Rank
Kaiyuree Moodley	Girls' Individual	77 (+7)	15	81 (+11)	158	27	76 (+6)	234	19	234	+24	22
Cole Stevens	Boys' Individual	75 (+5)	20	72 (+2)	147	10	80 (+10)	227	25	227	+17	21

Team

Athletes	Event	Round 1 (Fourball)		Round 2 (Foursome)		Round 3 (Individual Stroke)				Total		
Athletes	Event	Score	Rank	Score	Rank	Girl	Boy	Total	Rank	Score	Par	Rank
Kaiyuree Moodley; Cole Stevens	Mixed team	69 (-1)	27	75 (+5)	18	76	75	151 (+11)	24	295	+15	23

== Gymnastics ==
=== Acrobatic ===
South Africa qualified a mixed pair based on its performance at the 2018 Acrobatic Gymnastics World Championship.

- Mixed pair - 1 team of 2 athletes
- Rachel Nell and Sidwell Madibeng

=== Artistic ===
South Africa qualified two gymnasts based on its performance at the 2018 African Junior Championship.

- Boys' artistic individual all-around - 1 quota
- Ruan Lange
- Girls' artistic individual all-around - 1 quota
- Lisa Conradie

=== Rhythmic ===
South Africa qualified one gymnast based on its performance at the 2018 African Junior Championship.

- Girls' rhythmic individual all-around - 1 quota

== Field hockey ==
Roster

1. Mishka Ellis (GK)
2. Nepo Serage (GK)
3. Kayla de Waal
4. Amaarah Hendricks (C)
5. Jacolene McLaren
6. Smuts Samantha
7. Zimkhitha Weston
8. Angel Nkosi
9. Angela Welham

=== Preliminary round ===
Pool A

Pos	Team	Pld	W	D	L	GF	GA	GD	Pts	Qualification
1	Argentina (H)	5	5	0	0	41	2	+39	15	Quarterfinals
2	India	5	4	0	1	29	10	+19	12	Quarterfinals
3	South Africa	5	3	0	2	19	13	+6	9	Quarterfinals
4	Austria	5	2	0	3	19	13	+6	6	Quarterfinals
5	Uruguay	5	1	0	4	23	13	+10	3	9th place game
6	Vanuatu	5	0	0	5	0	80	−80	0	11th place game

Source: FIH
Rules for classification: 1) Points; 2) Goal difference; 3) Goals scored; 4) Head-to-head result.
(H) Hosts

7 October 2018
14:45

South Africa	4–3	Uruguay
de Waal 4', 6', 14'; Weston 20'	Report	Oliveros 1', 19'; Arias 10'

Umpires:
Victoria Pazos (PAR)
Chen Jianjun (CHN)

8 October 2018
10:15

Vanuatu	0–11	South Africa
	Report	Weston 4', 7', 20' de Waal 8', 11', 13'; McLaren 9'; Welham 16'; Nkosi 18', 18', 19'

Umpires:
Chen Jianjun (CHN)
Fatma Mahmoud (EGY)

9 October 2018
17:45

South Africa	0–4	Argentina
	Report	Cerundolo 3'; Bruggesser 4'; Palet 5', 12'

Umpires:
Sophie Bockelmann (GER)
Rhiannon Murrie (AUS)

10 October 2018
13:15

Austria	1–2	South Africa
Herzog 16'	Report	de Waal 3', 14'

Umpires:
Margaux Brand (CAN)
Ayu Zainuddin (MAS)

11 October 2018
14:00

South Africa	2–5	India
de Waal 10'; Welham 19'	Report	Khan 2', 17'; Reet 10'; Lalremsiami 12'; Chaudhary 13'

Umpires:
Rhiannon Murrie (AUS)
Fatma Mahmoud (EGY)

=== Final round ===
Quarterfinal

12 October 2018
15:00

Australia	3–3	South Africa
Lawton 4', 16'; Young 14'	Report	de Waal 6', 11'; McLaren 19'
Penalties
Sertorio (penalty shoot-out scored); Schonell (penalty shoot-out scored); Lawton (penalty shoot-out missed); Schonell (penalty shoot-out missed)	2–3	(penalty shoot-out scored) de Waal; (penalty shoot-out missed) Welham; (penalty shoot-out scored) Weston; (penalty shoot-out scored) de Waal

Umpires:
Victoria Pazos (PAR)
Fatma Mahmoud (EGY)

Semifinal

13 October 2018
17:00

Argentina	11–0	South Africa
Cerundolo 7', 20' di Santo 9', 18'; Rubenacker 10', 10', 19'; Palet 13', 15'; Bruggesser 14', 17'	Report

Umpires:
Rhiannon Murrie (AUS)
Sophie Bockelmann (GER)

Bronze-medal match

14 October 2018
14:00

South Africa	0–6	China
	Report	Gu 2'; Zou 7', 20'; Yu 13'; Ma 14'; Cai 15'

Umpires:
Victoria Pazos (PAR)
Fatma Mahmoud (EGY)

== Modern pentathlon ==
South Africa qualified two pentathletes based on its performance at the Asian/Oceanian Youth Olympic Games Qualifier.

- Boys' Individual - Rhys Poovan
- Girls' Individual - Alida van der Merwe

== Rowing ==
South Africa qualified two boats based on its performance at the 2017 World Junior Rowing Championships.

- Boys' single sculls - 1 athlete
- Girls' single sculls - 1 athlete

== Rugby sevens ==
- Boys' tournament - 1 team of 12 athletes

Roster

- Christie Grobbelaar
- Tiaan Pretorius
- Dawid Kellerman
- Celimpilo Gumede
- Albertus Horn
- Mnombo Zwelendaba
- William Rose
- Kobus Hattingh
- Ross Braude
- Muzi Manyike
- Ofentse Maubane
- Diego Appollis

=== Group stage ===
Pos	Team	Pld	W	D	L	PF	PA	PD	Pts
1	Argentina	5	5	0	0	180	38	+142	15
2	France	5	4	0	1	111	65	+46	13
3	Japan	5	2	1	2	74	103	−29	10
4	South Africa	5	2	0	3	79	84	−5	9
5	United States	5	0	2	3	67	120	−53	7
6	Samoa	5	0	1	4	48	149	−101	6

Source: Buenos Aires 2018
Rules for classification: 1) Points; 2) Head-to-head result; 3) Point difference; 4) Points scored.

13 October 2018
13:15

South Africa	12–14	Japan
Try: Maubane 3'c Kellerman 7'm Con: Hattingh (1/2) 3'	Report	Try: Nakanishi 6'c Konishi 11'c Con: Yamada (2/2) 7', 12'

Club Atlético San Isidro, Buenos Aires
Referee: Nehuen Jauri Rivero (Argentina)

13 October 2018
16:20

South Africa	12–17	France
Try: Manyike 6'c Zwelendaba 11'm Con: Manyike (1/1) 6'; Rose (0/1)	Report	Try: Trouabal (2) 1'm, 7'c Dridi 3'm Con: Germain (1/3) 7'

Club Atlético San Isidro, Buenos Aires
Referee: Paulo Duarte (Portugal)

14 October 2018
9:15

South Africa	19–12	United States
Try: Grobbelaar 4'c Pretorius 7'c Manyike 14'm Con: Hattingh (1/1) 4'; Rose (1/2) 8'	Report	Try: Mahe 1'c Kruse 11'm Con: Mahe (1/1) 2'; Rodriguez (0/1)

Club Atlético San Isidro, Buenos Aires
Referee: Francisco González (Uruguay)

14 October 2018
12:20

South Africa	5–34	Argentina
Try: Gumede 12'm Con: Rose (0/1)	Report	Try: Mendy (2) 3'm, 5'm Moneta 6'c Costa 8'm Elicagaray 10'c González 14'm Con: Elicagaray (2/4) 7', 10'; Roger (0/2)

Club Atlético San Isidro, Buenos Aires
Referee: Francisco González (Uruguay)

15 October 2018
11:05

South Africa	31–7	Samoa
Try: Hattingh 1'c Rose 7'; Pretorius 7'm Kellerman 9'c Manyike 11'm Con: Hattingh (1/1) 2'; Rose (2/4) 7', 10'	Report	Try: Lonetona Tautala 5'; Con: Sepulona (1/1) 5'

Club Atlético San Isidro, Buenos Aires
Referee: Nehuen Jauri Rivero (Argentina)

=== Bronze Medal Game ===
15 October 2018
15:10

Japan	28–5	South Africa
Try: Fujii 2'c Nakanishi 3'c Konishi (2) 8'c, 12'c Con: Konishi (4/4) 2', 3', 9', 12'	Report	Try: Maubane 13'm Con: Braude (0/1)

Club Atlético San Isidro, Buenos Aires
Referee: Damián Schneider (Argentina)

== Sailing ==
South Africa qualified one boat based on its performance at the African and European IKA Twin Tip Racing Qualifiers.

Athlete	Event	Race						Net Points	Final Rank
Athlete	Event	1	2	3	4	5	6	Net Points	Final Rank
Dorothy Gouws	IKA Twin Tip Racing	9	7	5	~~DSQ~~	~~DNS~~	9	30	10

== Shooting ==
South Africa qualified one sport shooter based on its performance at the 2017 African Championships.

- Boys' 10m Air Rifle - 1 quota

Individual

Athlete	Event	Qualification		Final	
Athlete	Event	Points	Rank	Points	Rank
Adriaan de Beer	Boys' 10m air rifle	583.4	20	did not advance	

Team

Athletes	Event	Qualification		Round of 16	Quarterfinals	Semifinals	Final / BM	
Athletes	Event	Points	Rank	Opposition Result	Opposition Result	Opposition Result	Opposition Result	Rank
Stephanie Grundsøe (DEN); Adriaan de Beer (RSA)	Mixed 10m air rifle	811.7	18	did not advance				

== Sport climbing ==
South Africa qualified two sport climbers based on its performance at the 2017 World African Sport Climbing Championships.

- Boys' combined - 1 quota (David Naude)
- Girls' combined - 1 quota (Angela Eckhardt)

== Tennis ==
Singles

Athlete	Event	Round of 32	Round of 16	Quarterfinals	Semifinals	Final / BM	
Athlete	Event	Opposition Score	Opposition Score	Opposition Score	Opposition Score	Opposition Score	Rank
P Henning	Boys' singles	F Díaz Acosta (ARG); L 0-6, 3–6	did not advance				

Doubles

Athletes	Event	Round of 32	Round of 16	Quarterfinals	Semifinals	Final / BM	
Athletes	Event	Opposition Score	Opposition Score	Opposition Score	Opposition Score	Opposition Score	Rank
P Henning (RSA); D N'tcha (BEN)	Boys' doubles	A Andreev (BUL); R Hijikata (AUS); L 2-6, 6–7	did not advance				
S Nahimana (BDI); P Henning (RSA)	Mixed doubles	T Naklo (THA); A Dawani (BHR); W 6-0, 6–1	K Juvan (SLO); M Miladinović (SRB); L 2-6, 6–4, 8–10	did not advance			

== Triathlon ==
South Africa qualified two athletes based on its performance at the 2018 African Youth Olympic Games Qualifier.

Individual

Athlete	Event	Swim (750m)	Trans 1	Bike (20 km)	Trans 2	Run (5 km)	Total Time	Rank
Christiaan Stroebel	Boys	9:39	0:32	27:31	0:28	19:24	57:34	21
Amber Schlebusch	Girls	9:59	0:46	30:17	0:28	17:15	58:45	1st place, gold medalist(s)

Relay

Athlete	Event	Total Times per Athlete (Swim 250m, Bike 6.6 km, Run 1.8 km)	Total Group Time	Rank
Africa 1 Amber Schlebusch (RSA); Christiaan Stroebel (RSA); Syrine Fattoum (TUN); Mohamed Aziz Sebai (TUN)	Mixed Relay	22:01 (2); 21:17 (5); 25:27 (12); 23:09 (9)	1:31:54 1P	9

== Weightlifting ==
South Africa qualified one athlete based on its performance at the 2018 African Youth Championships.

Athlete	Event	Snatch		Clean & Jerk		Total	Rank
Athlete	Event	Result	Rank	Result	Rank	Total	Rank
Jayden Dylon Pretorius	Boys' −77 kg	112	6	133	6	245	6

== Wrestling ==
South Africa qualified one wrestler based on its performance at the 2018 African Cadet Championships.

Key:
- VSU – Without any points scored by the opponent

Athlete	Event	Group stage			Final / RM	Rank
Athlete	Event	Opposition Score	Opposition Score	Rank	Opposition Score	Rank
Fernando Booysen	Boys' freestyle −48kg	Jalolov (UZB); L 0 – 10 ^{VSU}	Gökdeniz (TUR); L 0 – 10 ^{VSU}	3 Q	Detudamo (NRU); W 10 – 0 ^{VSU}	5
