= Archery at the 2018 Summer Youth Olympics – Boys' individual =

Boys' singles at the III Summer Youth Olympic Games
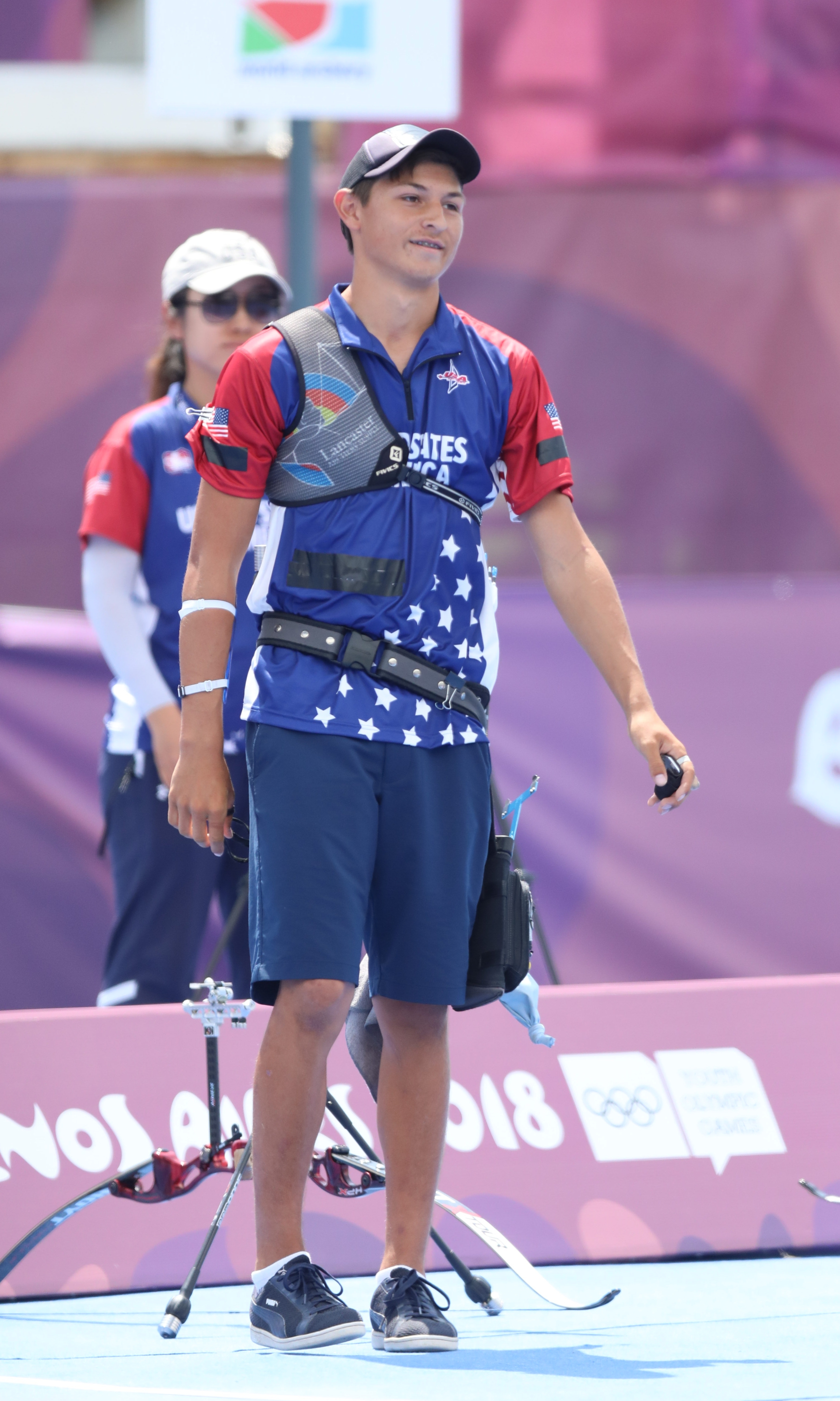
- Gold medallist Trenton Cowles (USA)
- Venue: Parque Sarmiento
- Dates: 12–17 October
- Competitors: 32 from 32 nations

Medalists
1st place, gold medalist(s)		Trenton Cowles	United States
2nd place, silver medalist(s)		Akash Akash	India
3rd place, bronze medalist(s)		Senna Roos	Belgium

These are the results for the boys' singles event at the 2018 Summer Youth Olympics.

== Results ==
=== Ranking round ===
Rank	Archer	Nation	Score
1	Song In-jun	South Korea	691
2	Tang Chih-chun	Chinese Taipei	689
3	Feng Hao	China	688
4	Carlos Daniel Vaca Cordero	Mexico	680
5	Akash Akash	India	679
6	Artem Ovchynnikov	Ukraine	679
7	Stanislav Cheremiskin	Russia	678
8	Senna Roos	Belgium	677
9	Samet Ak	Turkey	672
10	Hendrik Õun	Estonia	671
11	Youssof Tolba	Egypt	670
12	Aitthiwat Soithong	Thailand	669
13	David Cadena	Colombia	667
14	Ravien Dalpatadu	Sri Lanka	667
15	Trenton Cowles	United States	665
16	Alejandro Benítez	Paraguay	663
17	Jason Hurnall	Australia	663
18	Mateus de Carvalho Almeida	Brazil	662
19	Hazael Jesus Rodríguez Valero	Cuba	660
20	Franck Eyeni	Ivory Coast	658
21	Jose Manuel Solera	Spain	657
22	Tetsuya Aoshima	Japan	654
23	Reza Shabani	Iran	653
24	Matthias Potrafke	Germany	651
25	Md Ibrahim Sheik Rezowan	Bangladesh	647
26	Alikhan Mustafin	Kazakhstan	646
27	Federico Fabrizzi	Italy	646
28	Benjamen Lee	Canada	636
29	Dan Thompson	Great Britain	630
30	Wian Roux	South Africa	609
31	Louis Gino Aurelien Juhel	Mauritius	606
32	Leonardo Tura	San Marino	584

=== Elimination rounds ===
==== Finals ====
Semi-finals
8	Senna Roos (BEL)	0	0	0
5	Akash Akash (IND)	2	2	2
6	Artem Ovchynnikov (UKR)	0	0	0
15	Trenton Cowles (USA)	2	2	2

Gold medal match
5	Akash Akash (IND)	0	0	0
15	Trenton Cowles (USA)	2	2	2
Bronze medal match
8	Senna Roos (BEL)	0	1	2	2	2
6	Artem Ovchynnikov (UKR)	2	1	0	0	0

==== Top half ====
===== Section 1 =====
1st round
1	Song In-jun (KOR)	0	2	2	2
32	Leonardo Tura (SMR)	2	0	0	0
17	Jason Hurnall (AUS)	0	2	2	0	0
16	Alejandro Benítez (PAR)	2	0	0	2	2
9	Samet Ak (TUR)	2	2	0	0	2
24	Matthias Potrafke (GER)	0	0	2	2	0
25	Md Ibrahim Sheik Rezowan (BAN)	0	0	1	2	2
8	Senna Roos (BEL)	2	2	1	0	0

2nd round
1	Song In-jun (KOR)	2	1	2	2
16	Alejandro Benítez (PAR)	0	1	0	0
9	Samet Ak (TUR)	0	1	0	0
8	Senna Roos (BEL)	2	1	2	2

Quarter finals
1	Song In-jun (KOR)	1	0	0	0
8	Senna Roos (BEL)	1	2	2	2

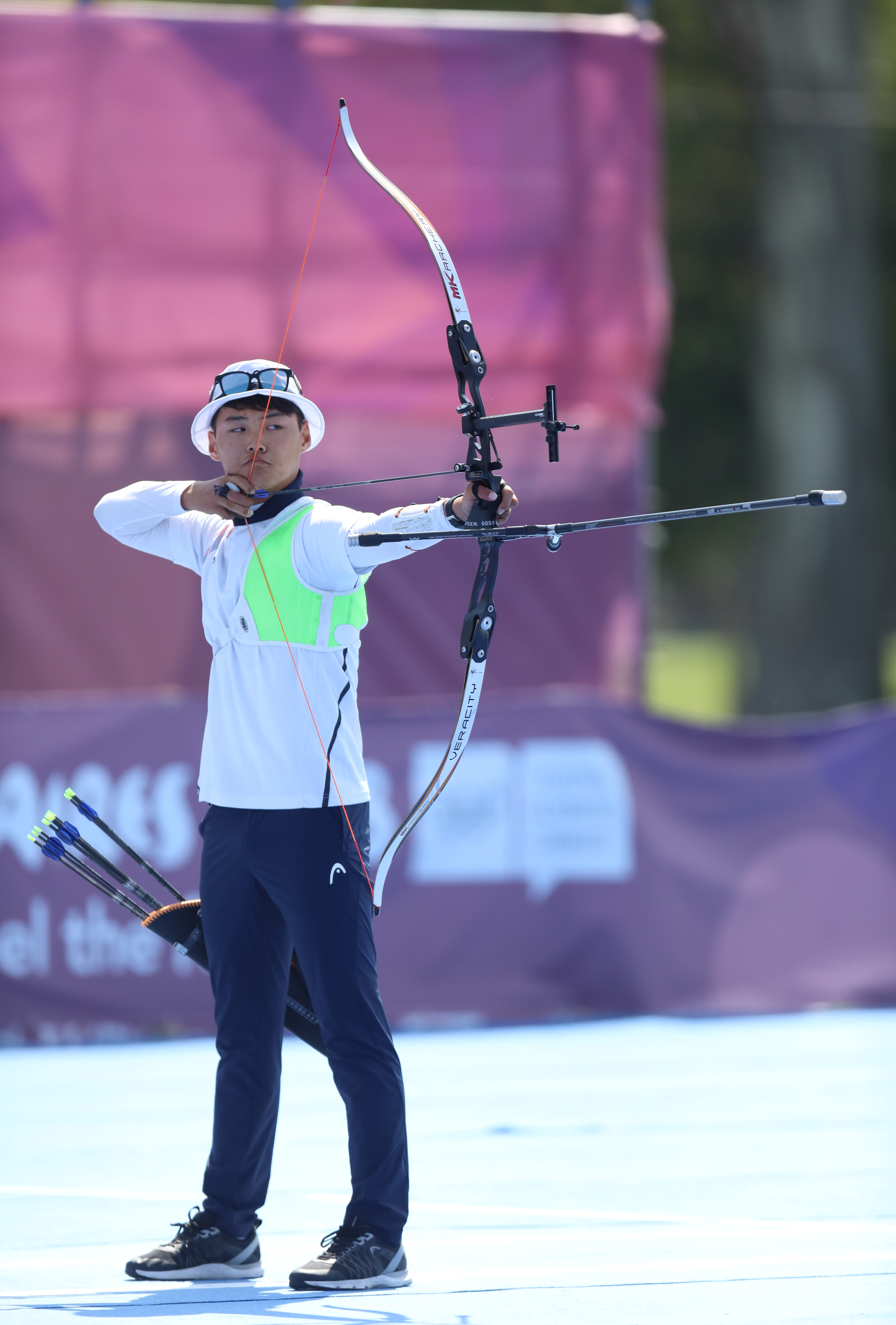
Song In-jun (KOR); all during the 2nd round

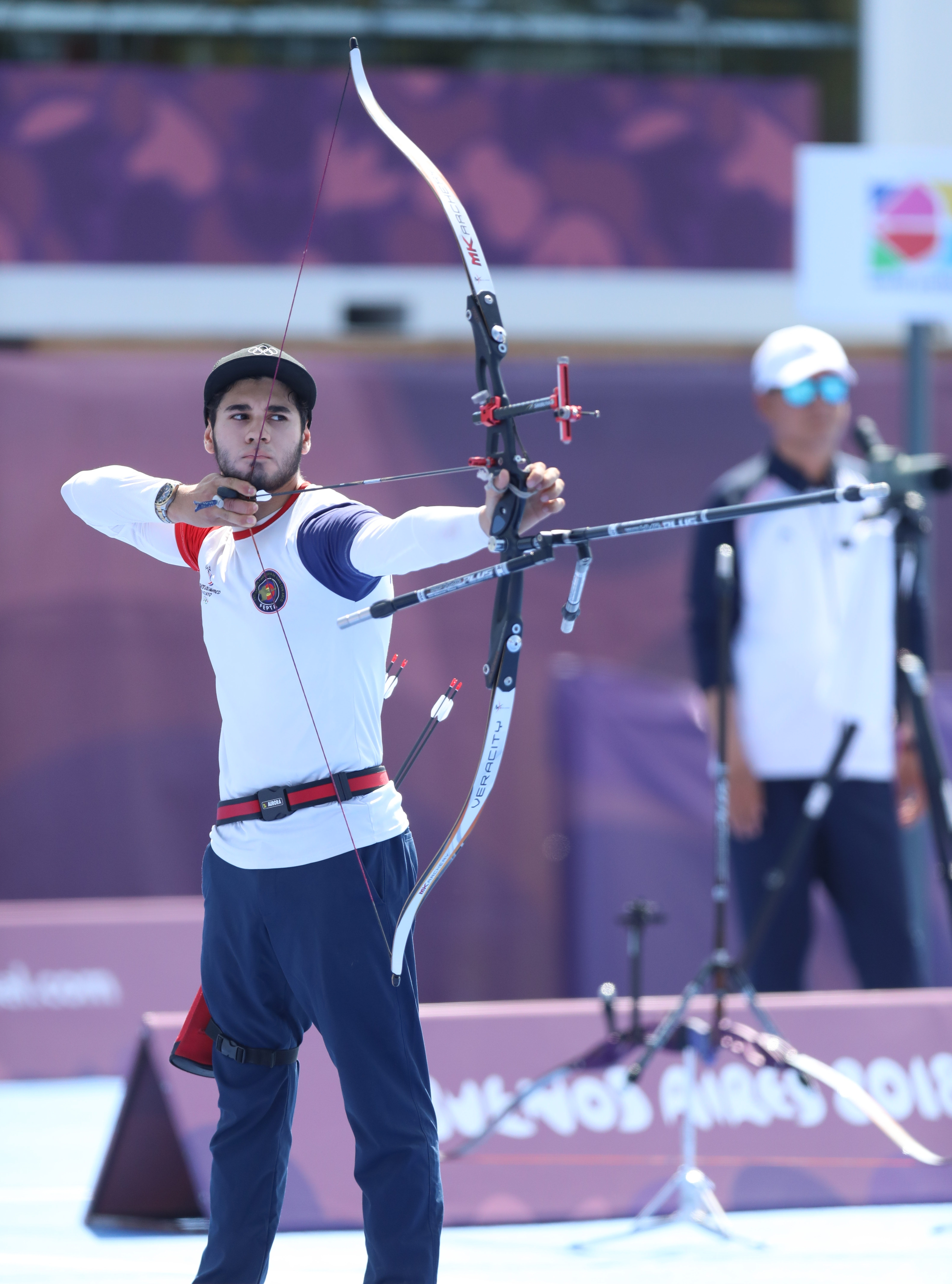
Alejandro Benítez (PAR)

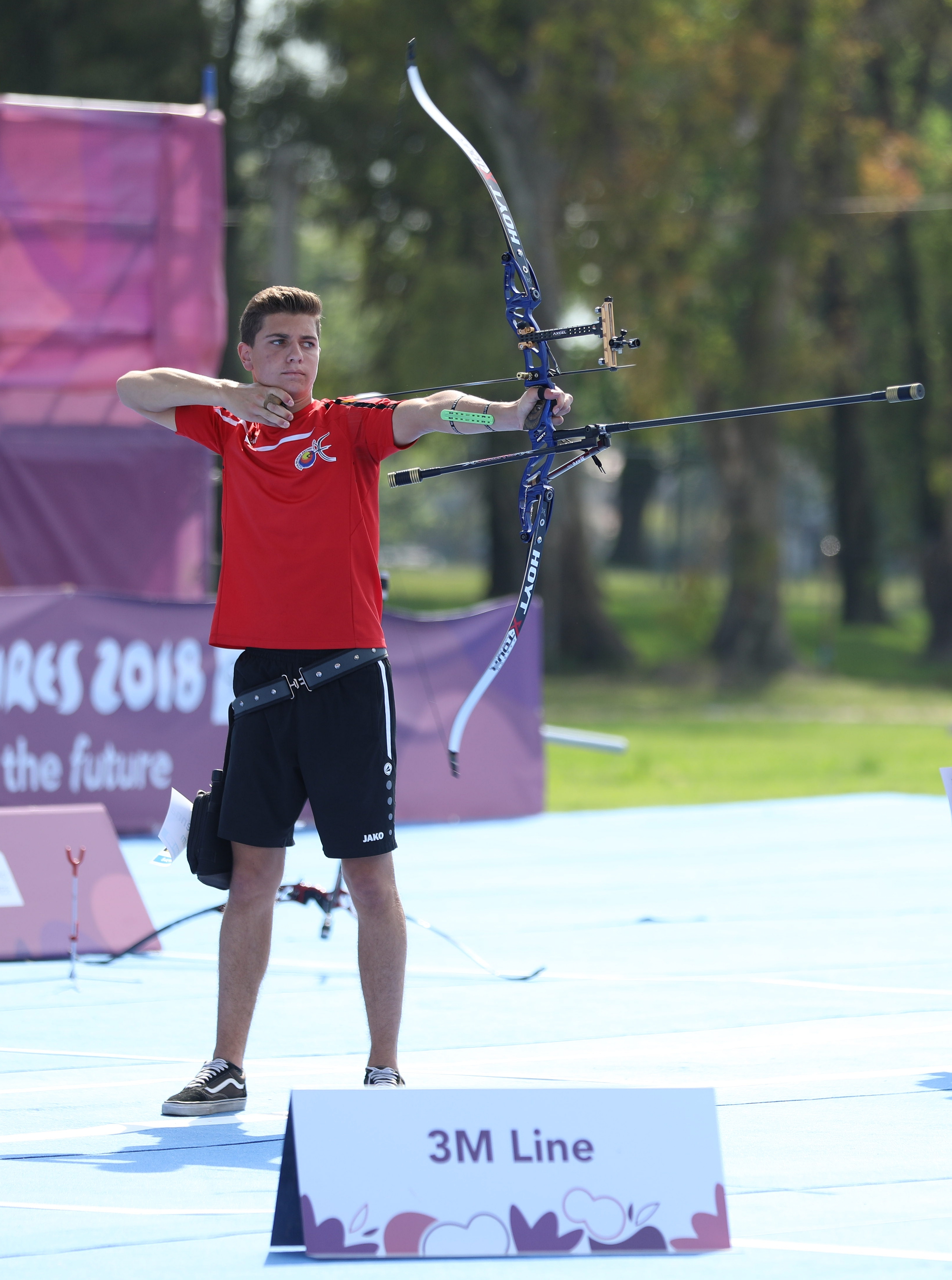
Senna Roos (BEL)

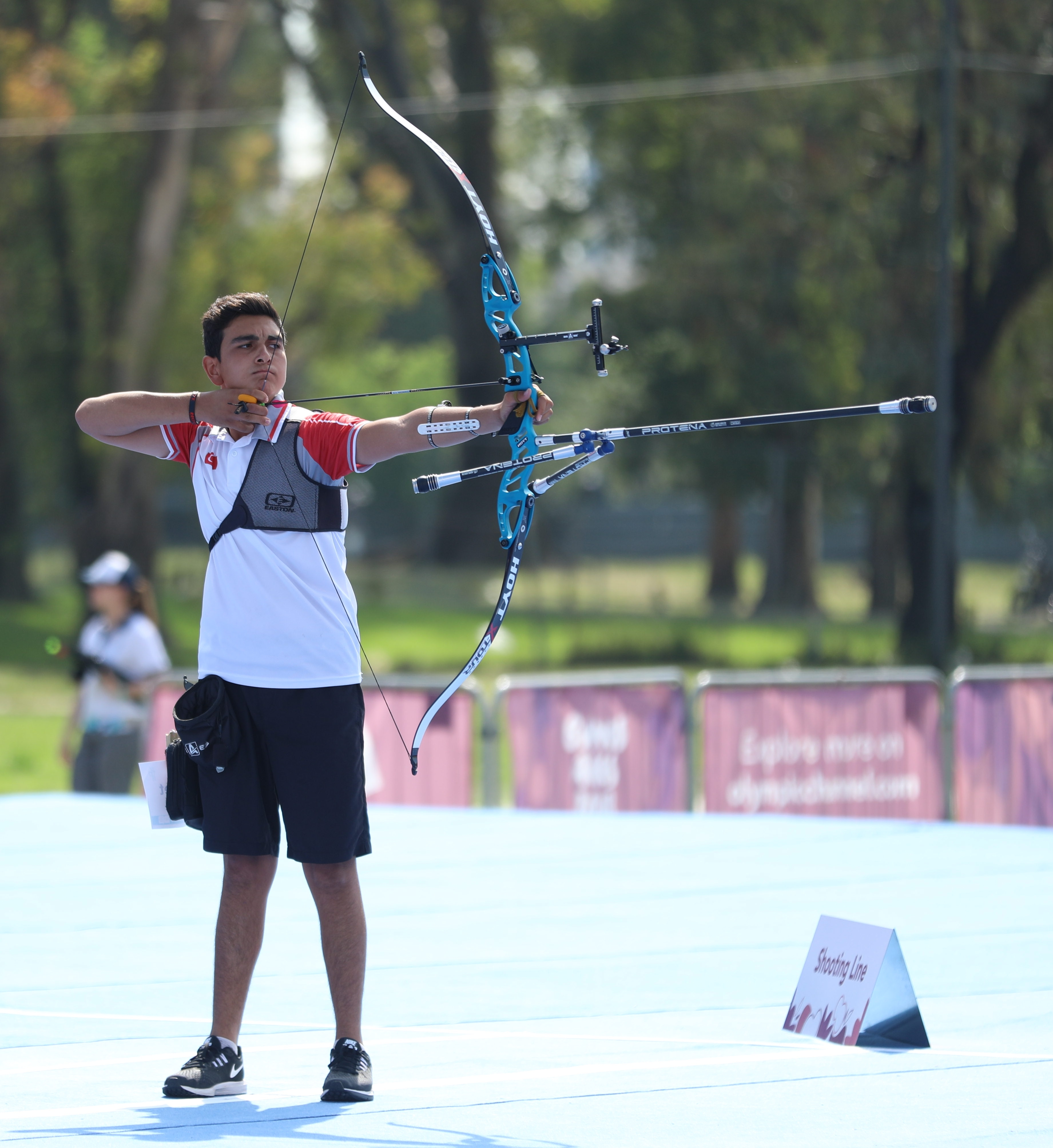
Samet Ak (TUR)

===== Section 2 =====
1st round
5	Akash Akash (IND)	0	2	1	0	2
28	Benjamen Lee (CAN)	2	0	1	2	0
21	Jose Manuel Solera (ESP)	0	0	2	2	2
12	Aitthiwat Soithong (THA)	2	2	0	0	0
13	David Cadena (COL)	0	2	0	2	2
20	Franck Eyeni (CIV)	2	0	2	0	0
29	Dan Thompson (GBR)	0	0	0
4	Carlos Daniel Vaca Cordero (MEX)	2	2	2

2nd round
5	Akash Akash (IND)	2	2	1	1
21	Jose Manuel Solera (ESP)	0	0	1	1
13	David Cadena (COL)	0	0	0
4	Carlos Daniel Vaca Cordero (MEX)	2	2	2

Quarter finals
5	Akash Akash (IND)	2	0	2	1	1
4	Carlos Daniel Vaca Cordero (MEX)	0	2	0	1	1

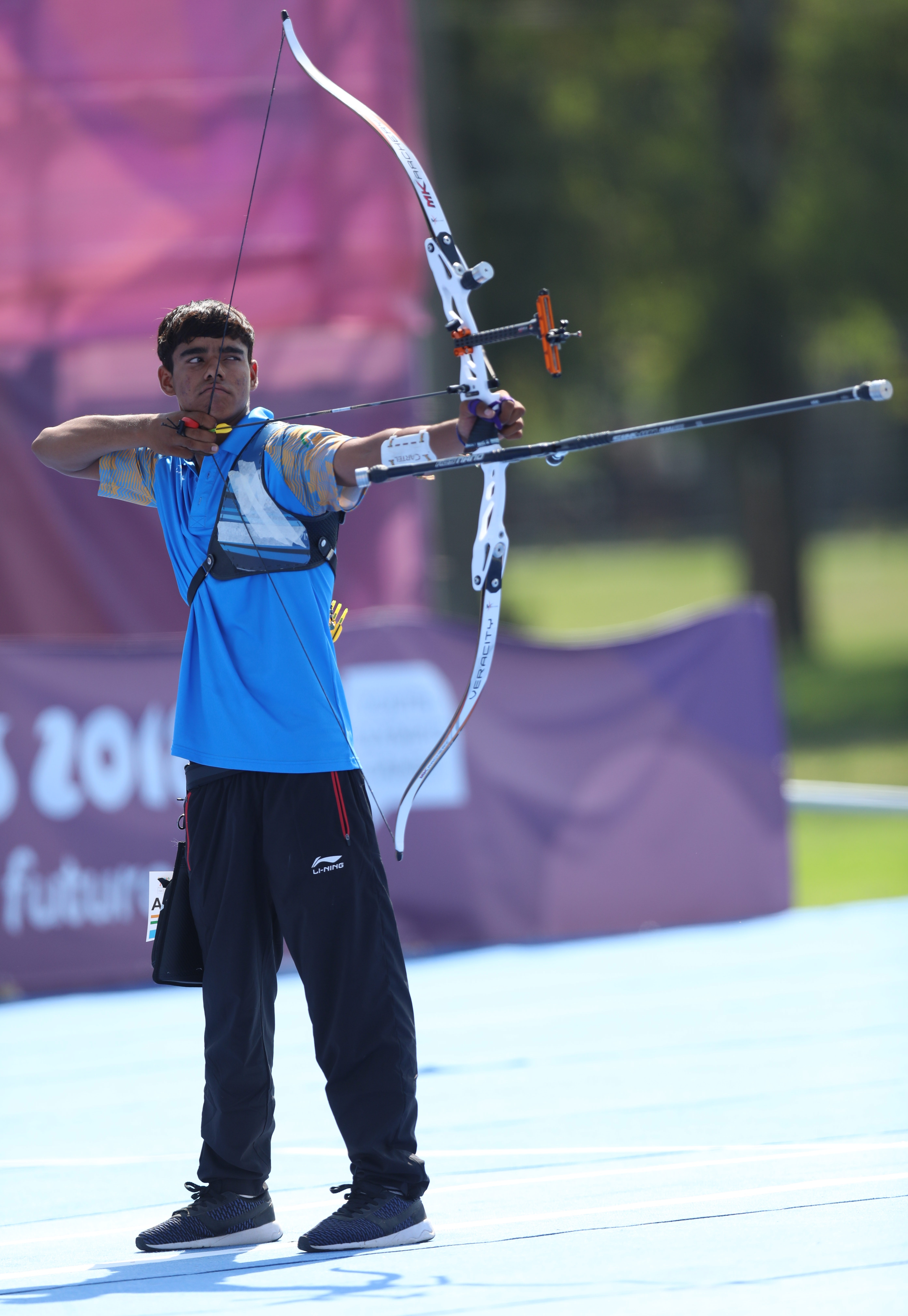
Akash Akash (IND); all during the 2nd round

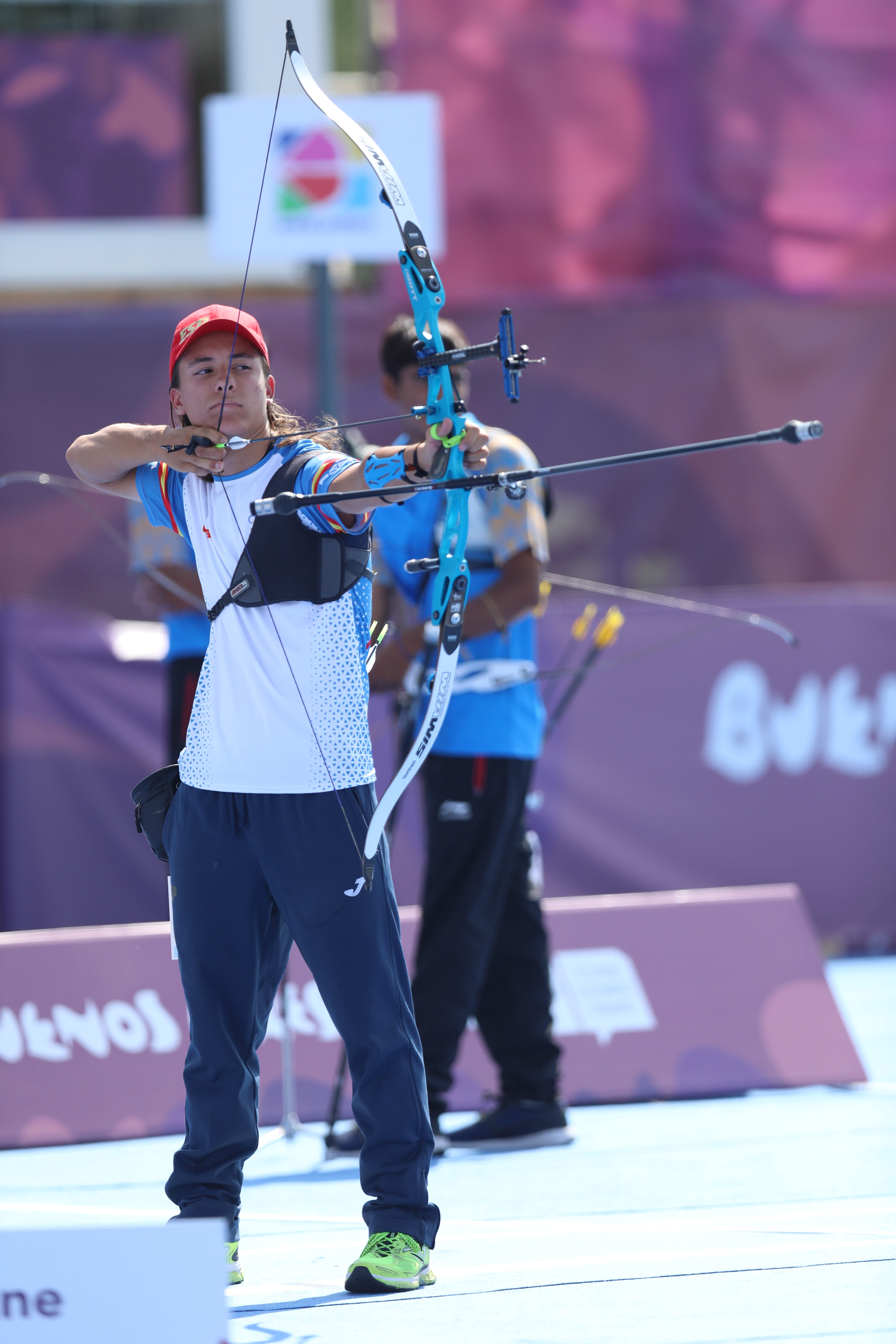
Jose Manuel Solera (ESP)

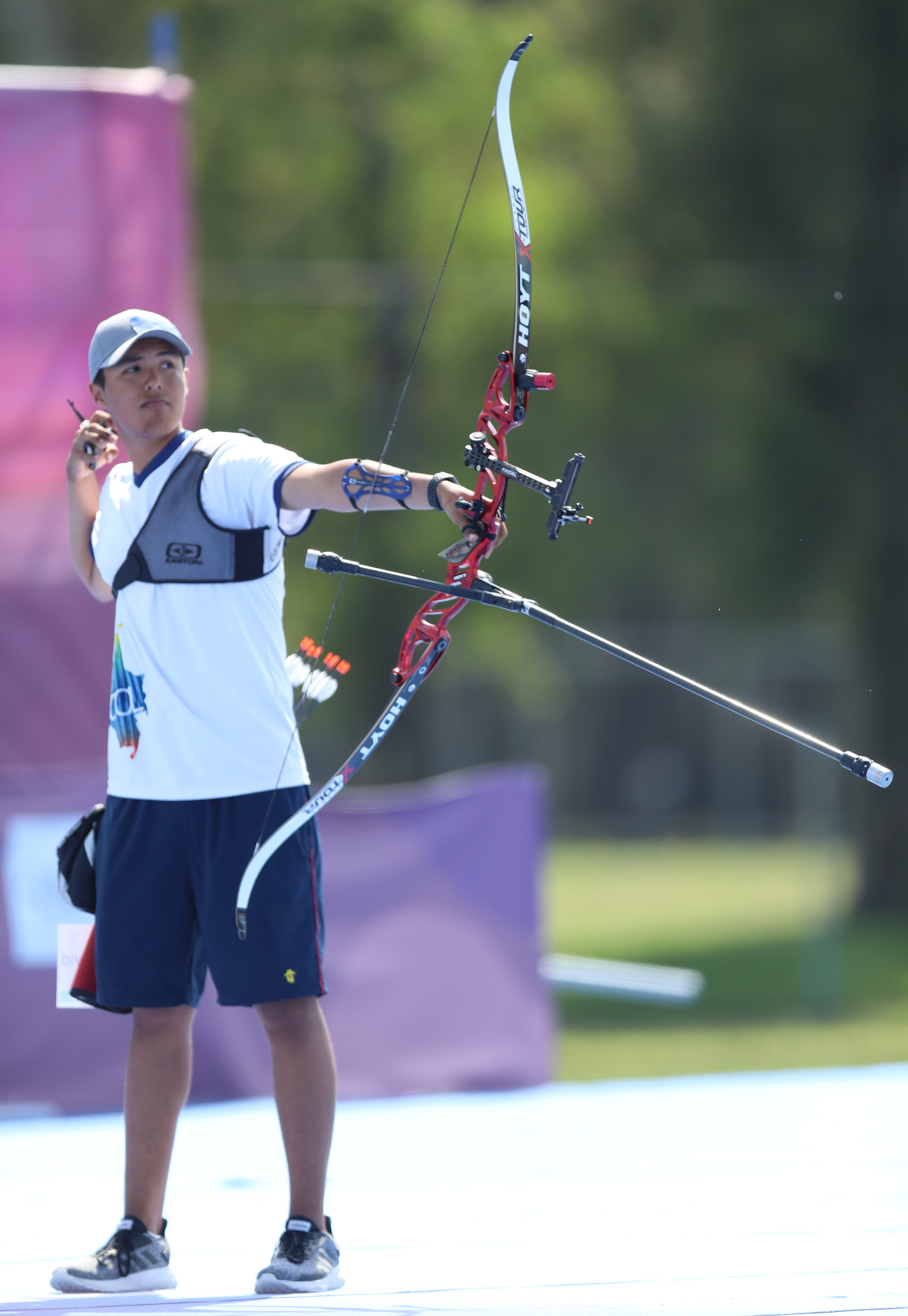
David Cadena (COL)

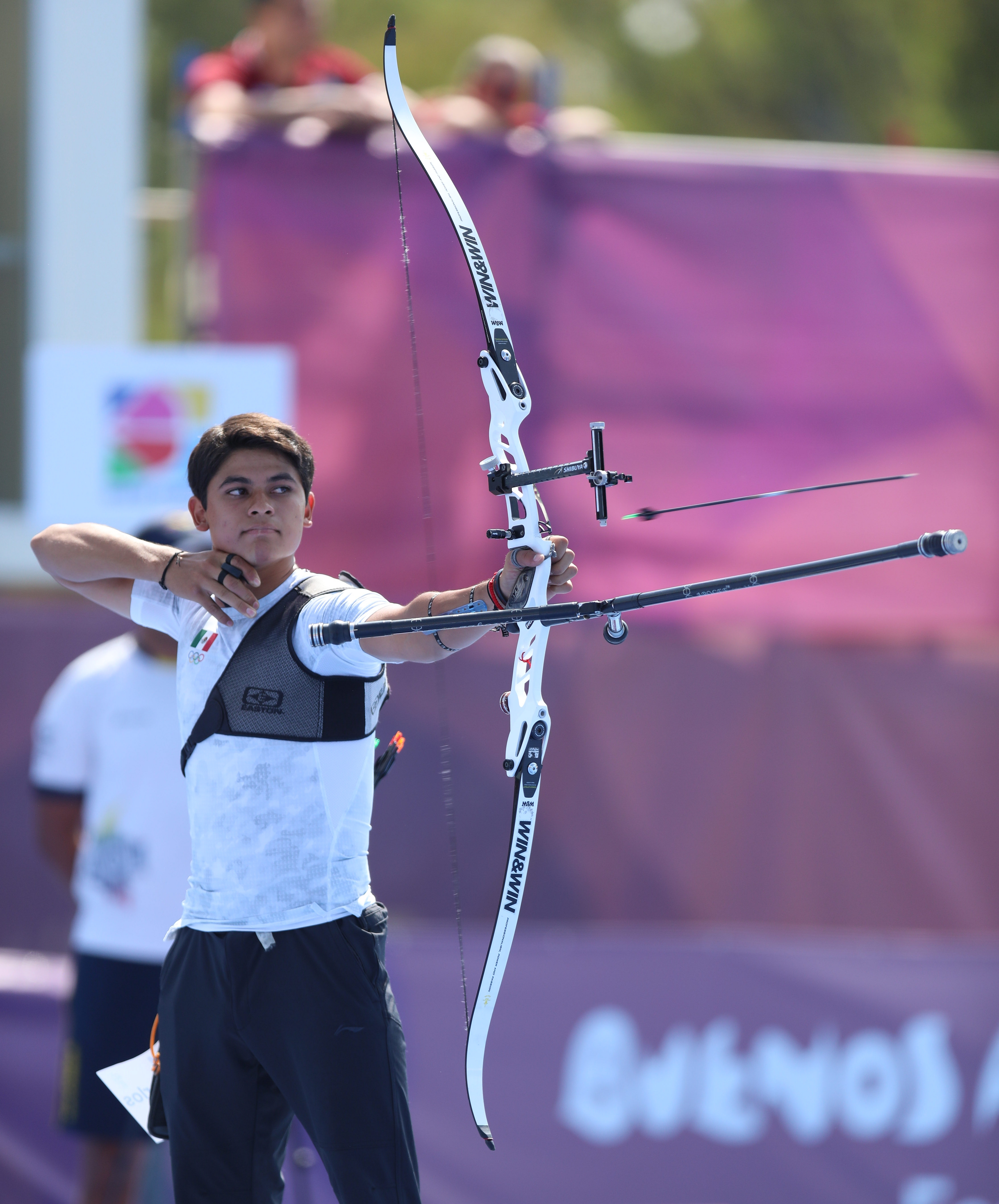
Carlos Daniel Vaca Cordero (MEX)

==== Bottom half ====
===== Section 3 =====
1st round
3	Feng Hao (CHN)	2	2	2
30	Wian Roux (RSA)	0	0	0
19	Hazael Jesus Rodríguez Valero (CUB)	2	0	0	2	1
14	Ravien Dalpatadu (SRI)	0	2	2	0	1
11	Youssof Tolba (EGY)	1	2	0	2	0
22	Tetsuya Aoshima (JPN)	1	0	2	0	2
27	Federico Fabrizzi (ITA)	0	0	2	0
6	Artem Ovchynnikov (UKR)	2	2	0	2

2nd round
3	Feng Hao (CHN)	2	1	2	0	0
14	Ravien Dalpatadu (SRI)	0	1	0	2	2
11	Youssof Tolba (EGY)	2	0	1	2	0
6	Artem Ovchynnikov (UKR)	0	2	1	0	2

Quarter finals
14	Ravien Dalpatadu (SRI)	2	0	0	0
6	Artem Ovchynnikov (UKR)	0	2	2	2

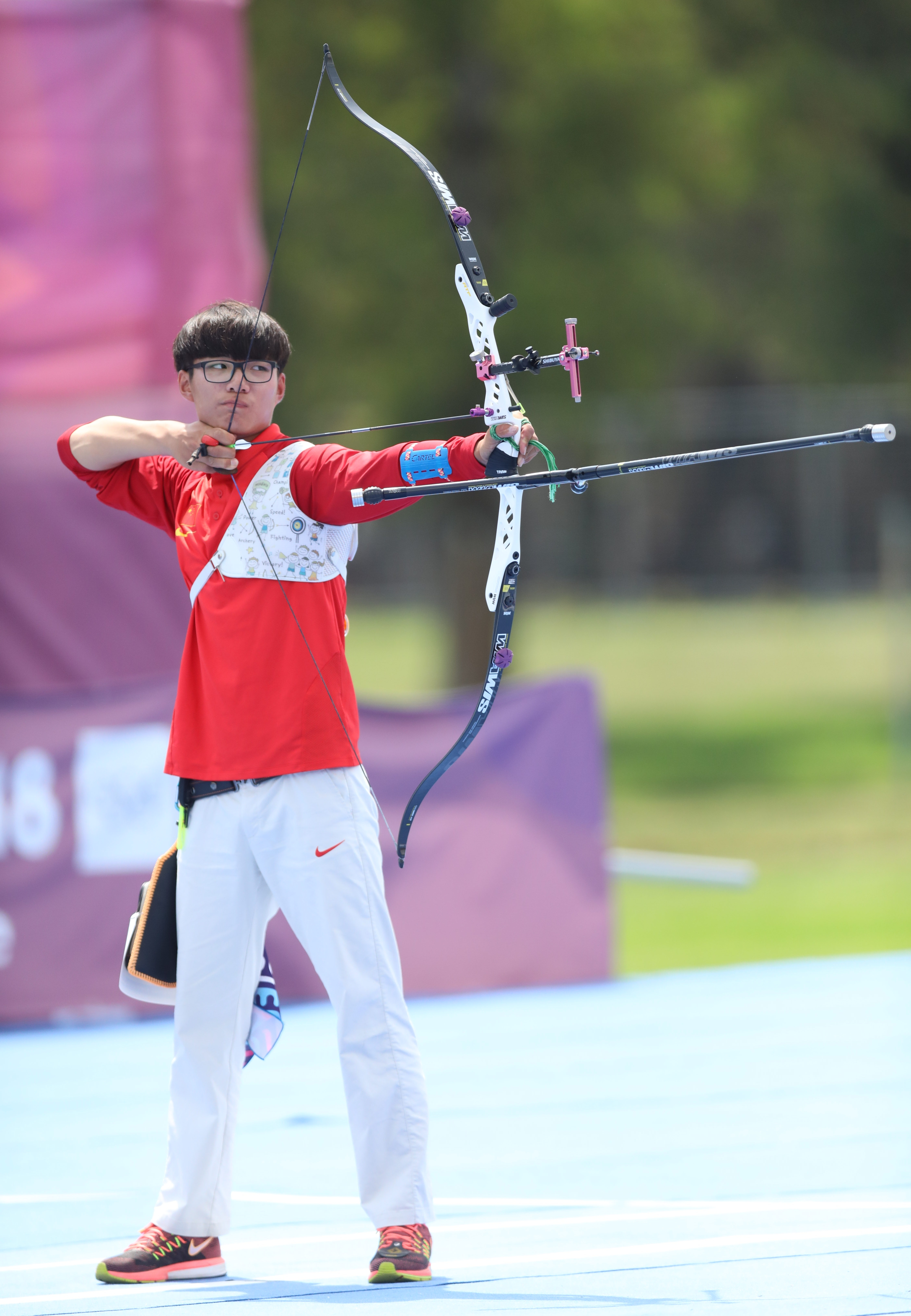
Feng Hao (CHN); all during the 2nd round

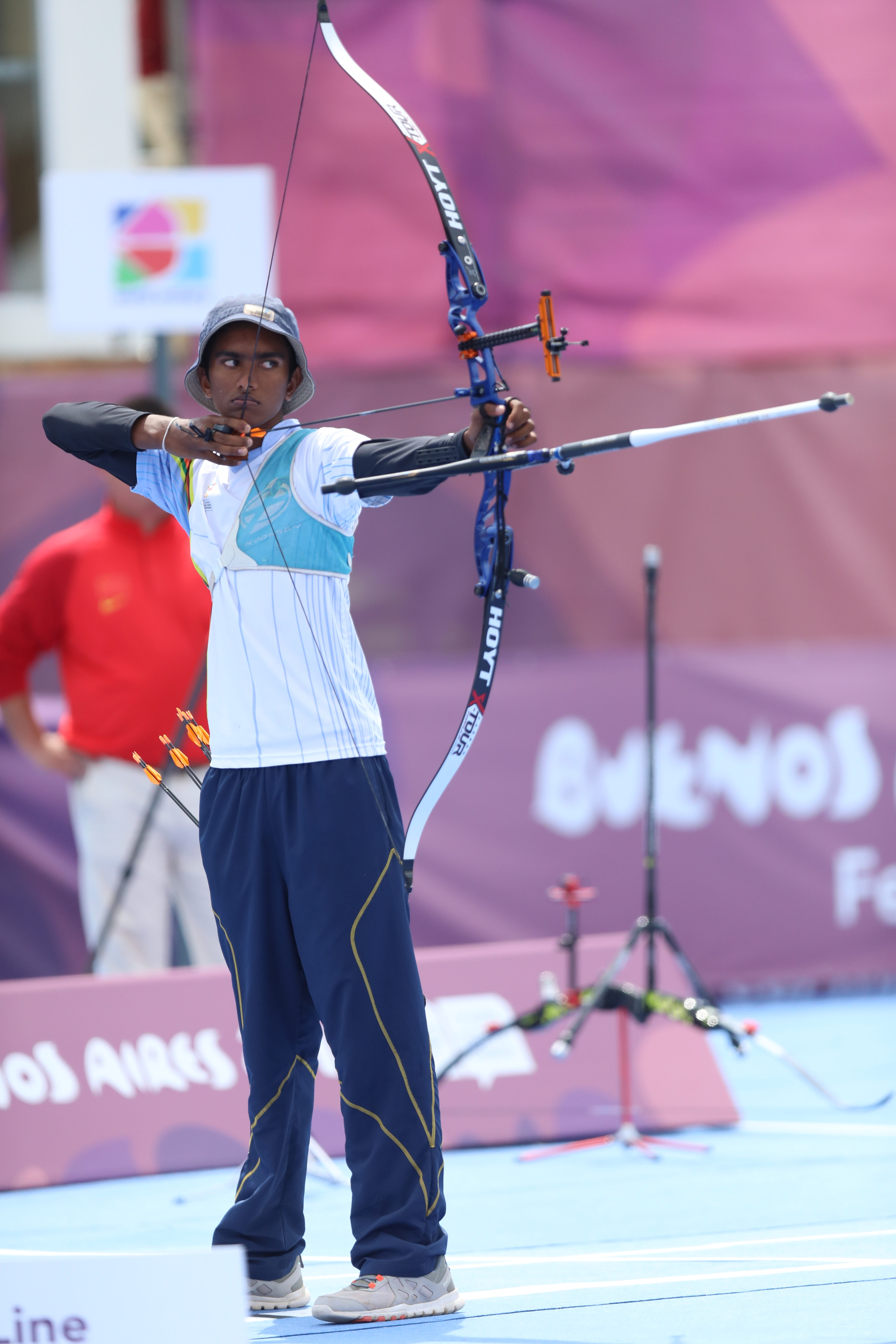
Ravien Dalpatadu (SRI)

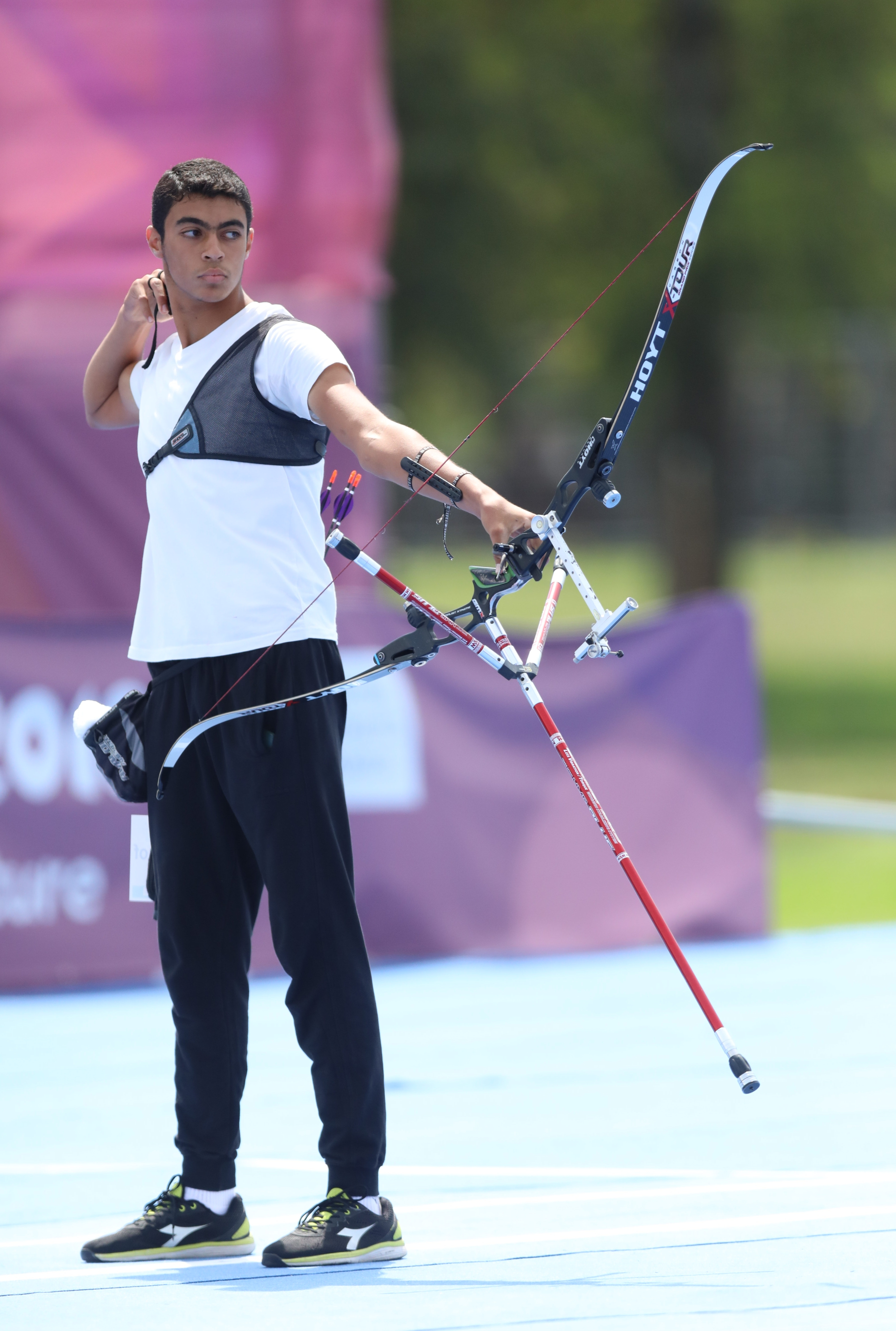
Youssof Tolba] (EGY)

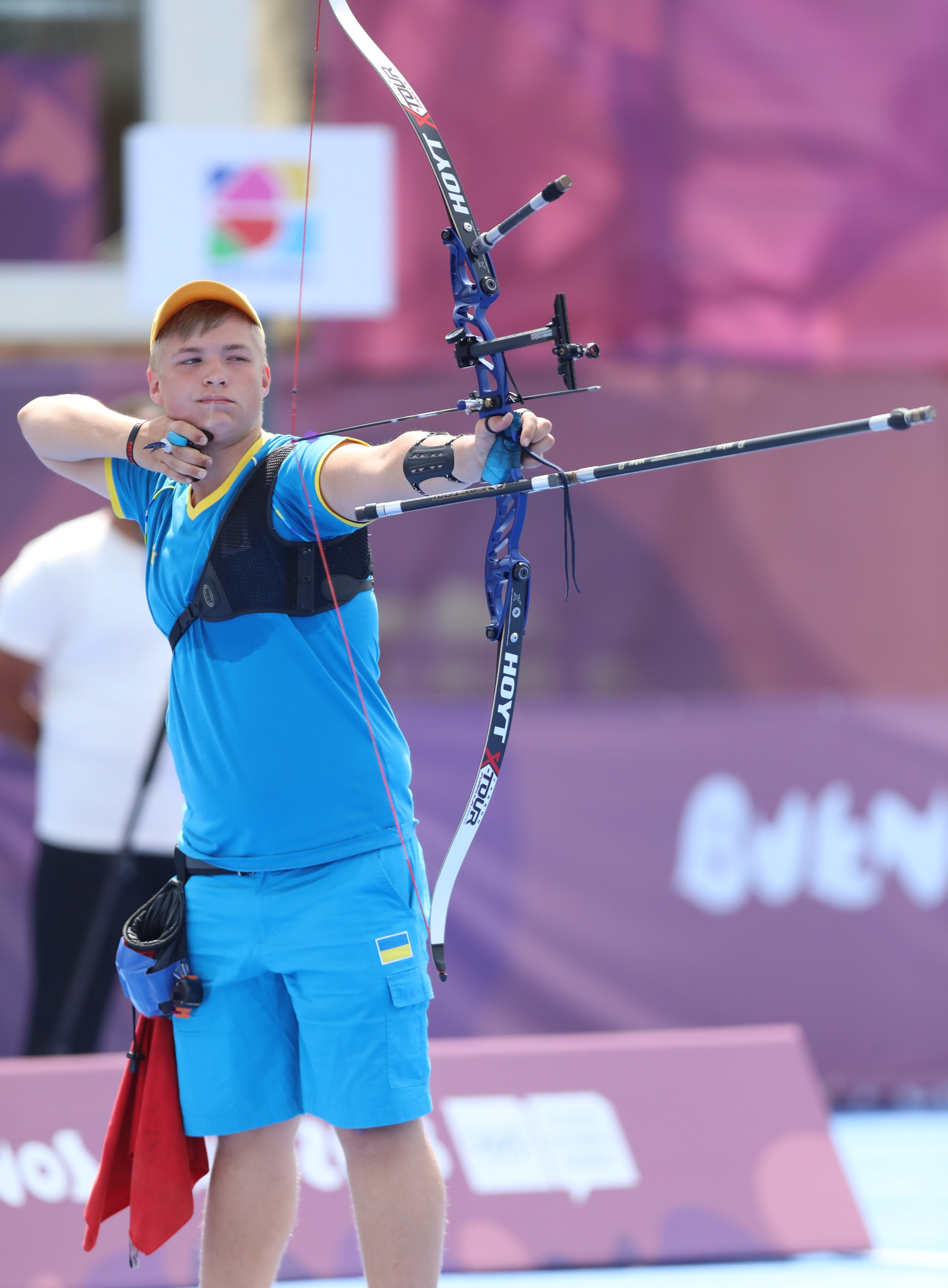
Artem Ovchynnikov (UKR)

===== Section 4 =====
1st round
7	Stanislav Cheremiskin (RUS)	0	2	2	2
26	Alikhan Mustafin (KAZ)	2	0	0	0
23	Reza Shabani (IRI)	2	0	2	2
10	Hendrik Õun (EST)	0	2	0	0
15	Trenton Cowles (USA)	2	2	2
18	Mateus de Carvalho Almeida (BRA)	0	0	0
31	Louis Gino Aurelien Juhel (MRI)	0	0	0
2	Tang Chih-chun (TPE)	2	2	2

2nd round
7	Stanislav Cheremiskin (RUS)	1	0	2	0	1
23	Reza Shabani (IRI)	1	2	0	2	1
15	Trenton Cowles (USA)	2	1	2	2
2	Tang Chih-chun (TPE)	0	1	0	0

Quarter finals
23	Reza Shabani (IRI)	0	0	0
15	Trenton Cowles (USA)	2	2	2

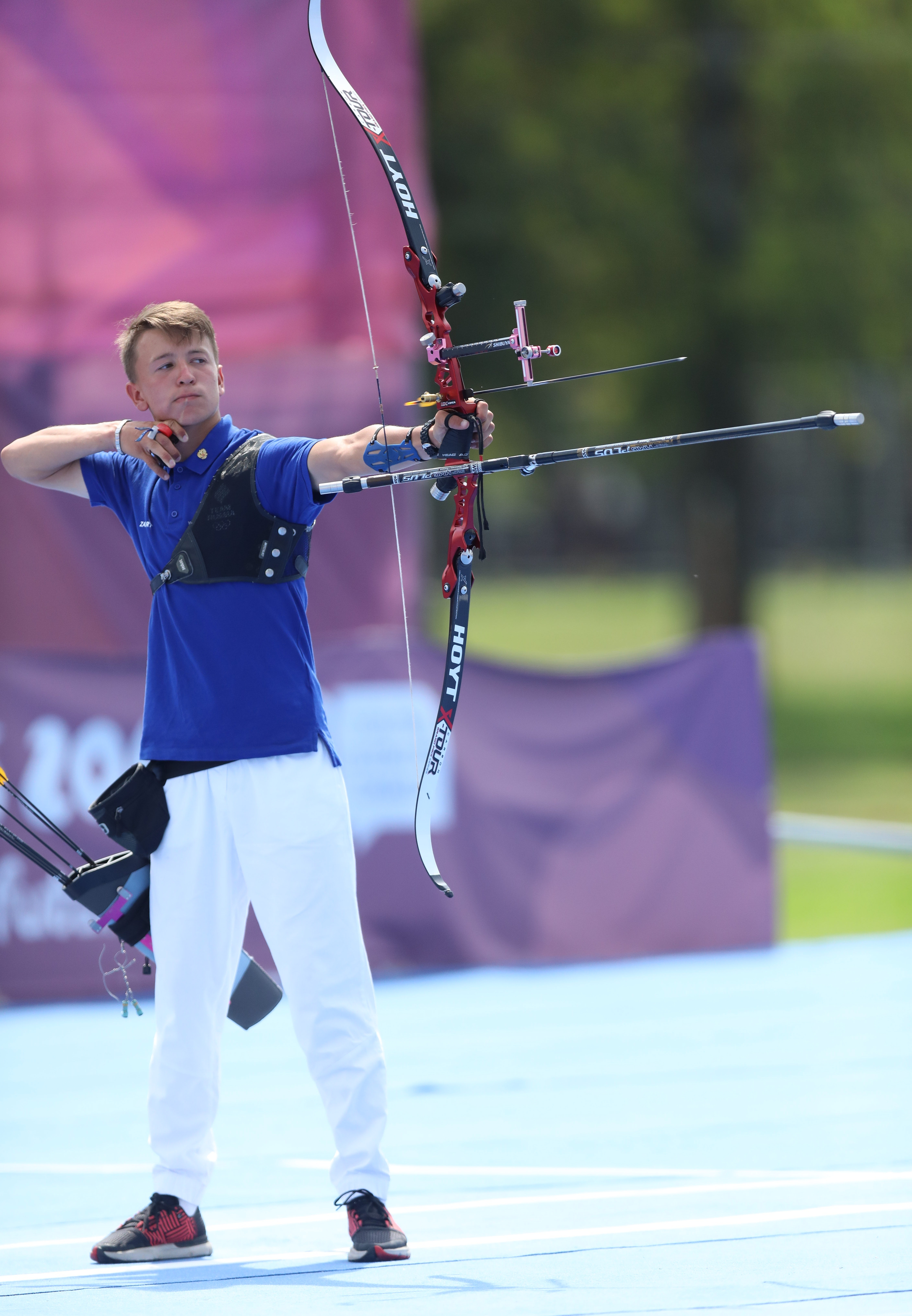
Stanislav Cheremiskin (RUS); all during the 2nd round

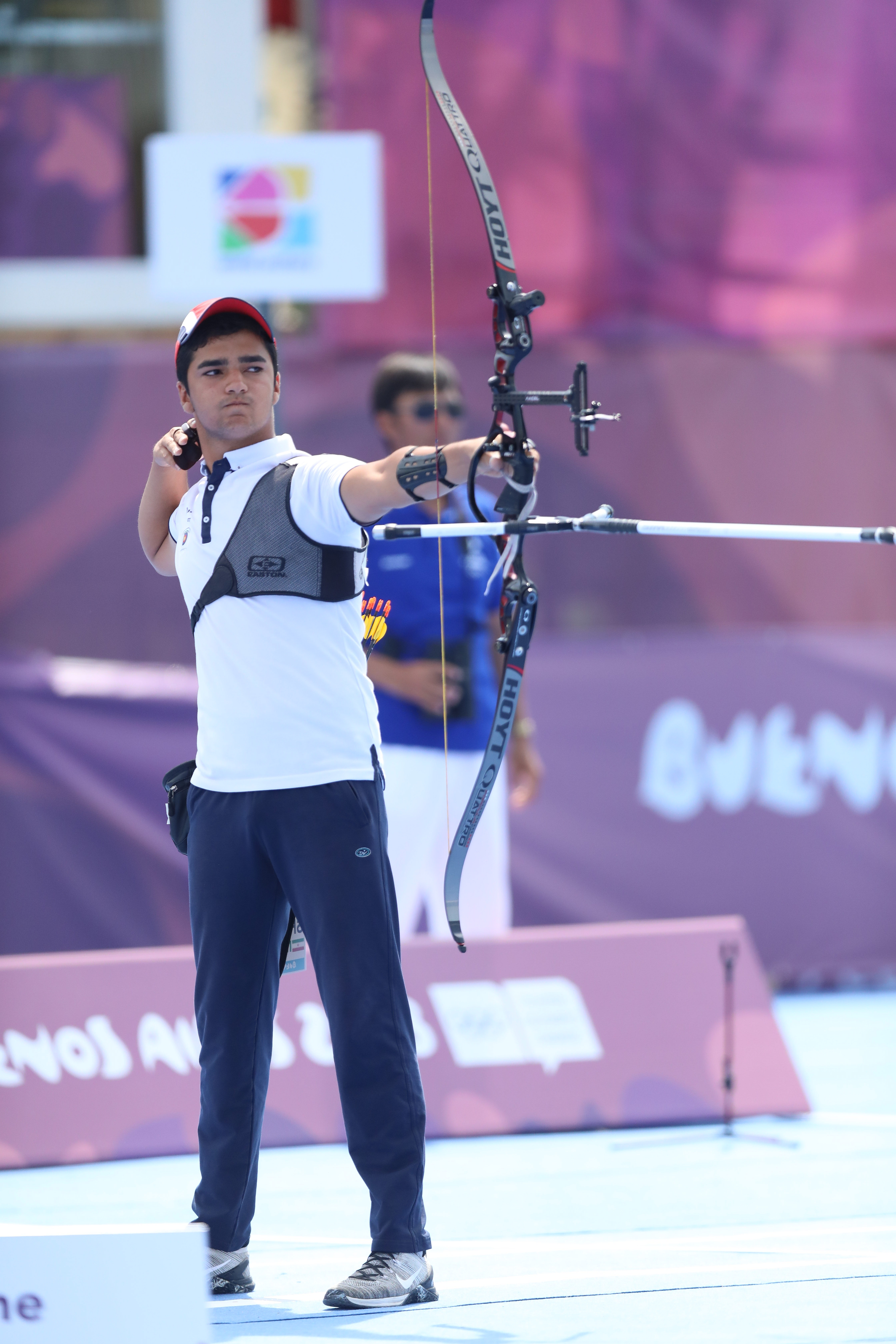
Reza Shabani (IRI)

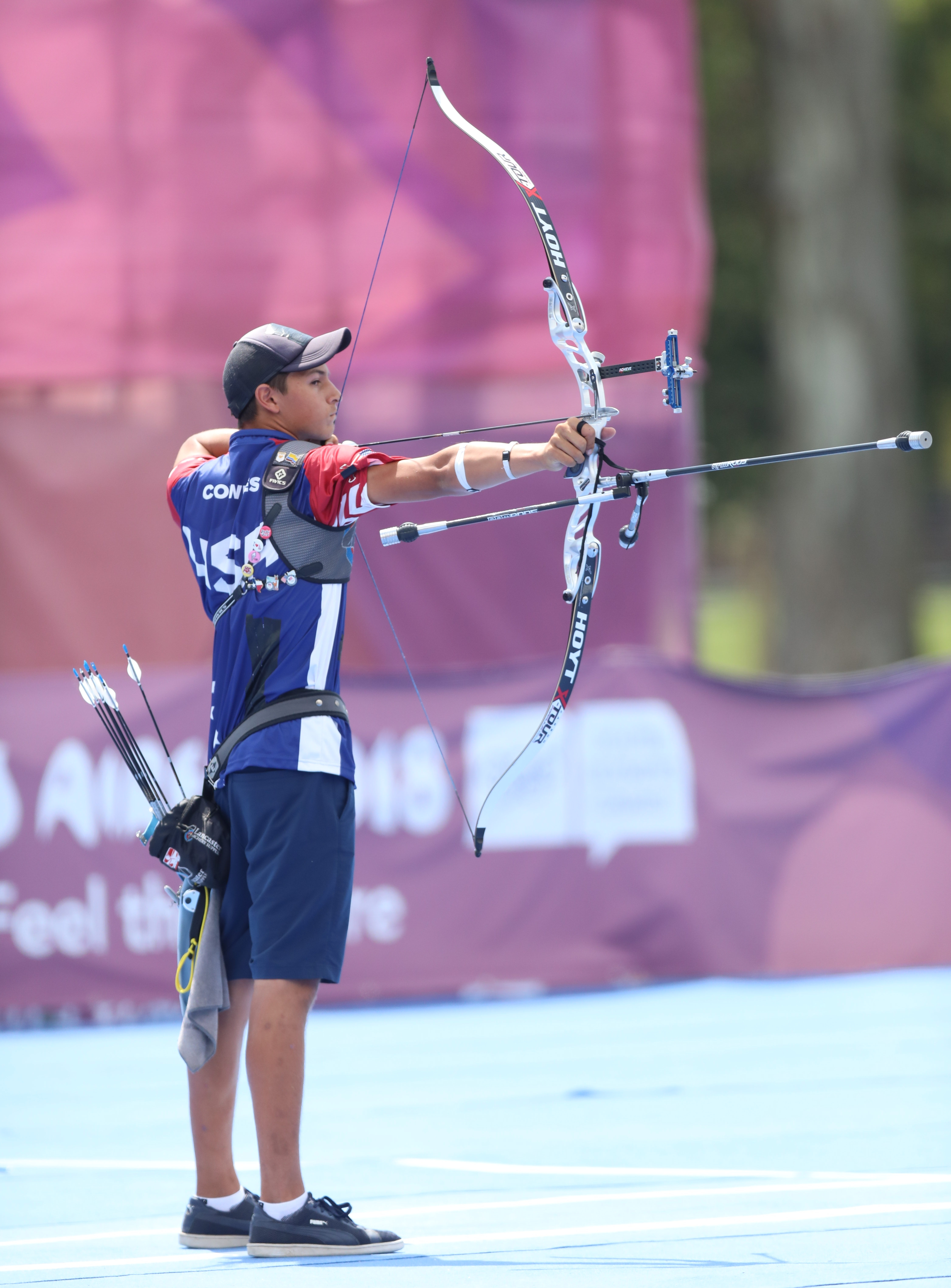
Trenton Cowles (USA)

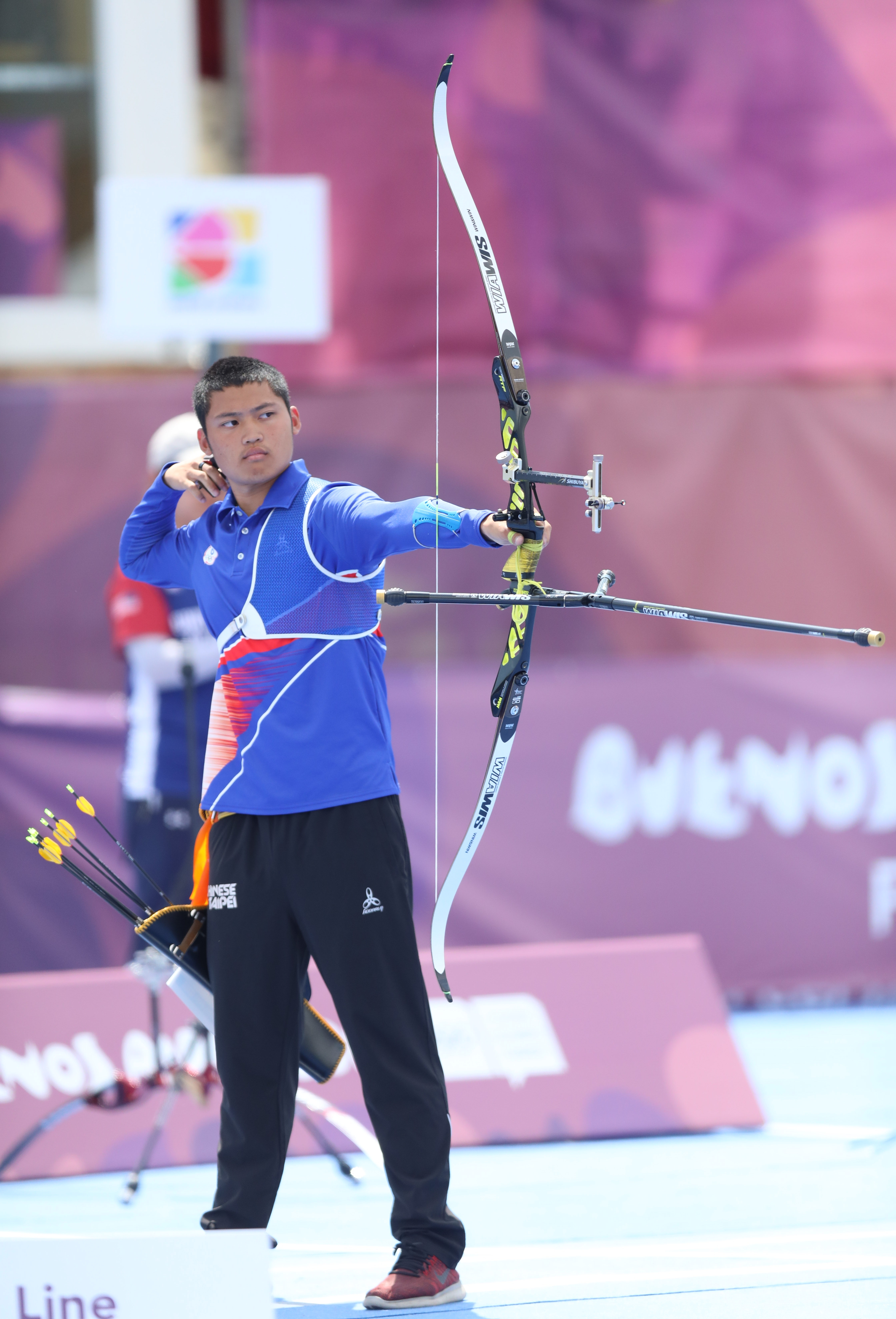
Tang Chih-chun (TPE)
