= Kippei Ishida =

Japan international rugby union player

- Born: 28 April 2000 (age 26) Amagasaki, Japan
- Height: 167 cm (5 ft 6 in)
- Weight: 73 kg (161 lb; 11 st 7 lb)

Rugby union career
- Position(s): Wing, Fullback, Loose forward
- Current team: Canon Eagles
Senior career
Years	Team	Apps	(Points)
2023–	Canon Eagles	28	(70)
International career
Years	Team	Apps	(Points)
2025–	Japan	13	(25)
National sevens team
Years	Team		Comps
2019–2024	Japan		20
Medal record
Men's rugby sevens
Representing Japan
Asian Games
Bronze medal – third place	2022 Hangzhou	Team
Summer Youth Olympics
Bronze medal – third place	2018 Buenos Aires	Team

Kippei Ishida (石田 吉平, born 28 April 2000) is a Japanese rugby sevens player. He competed in the men's tournament at the 2020 Summer Olympics.

Ishida captained the Japanese sevens side that competed at the 2024 Summer Olympics in Paris.
