= Cheikh Tiberghien =

French rugby union player

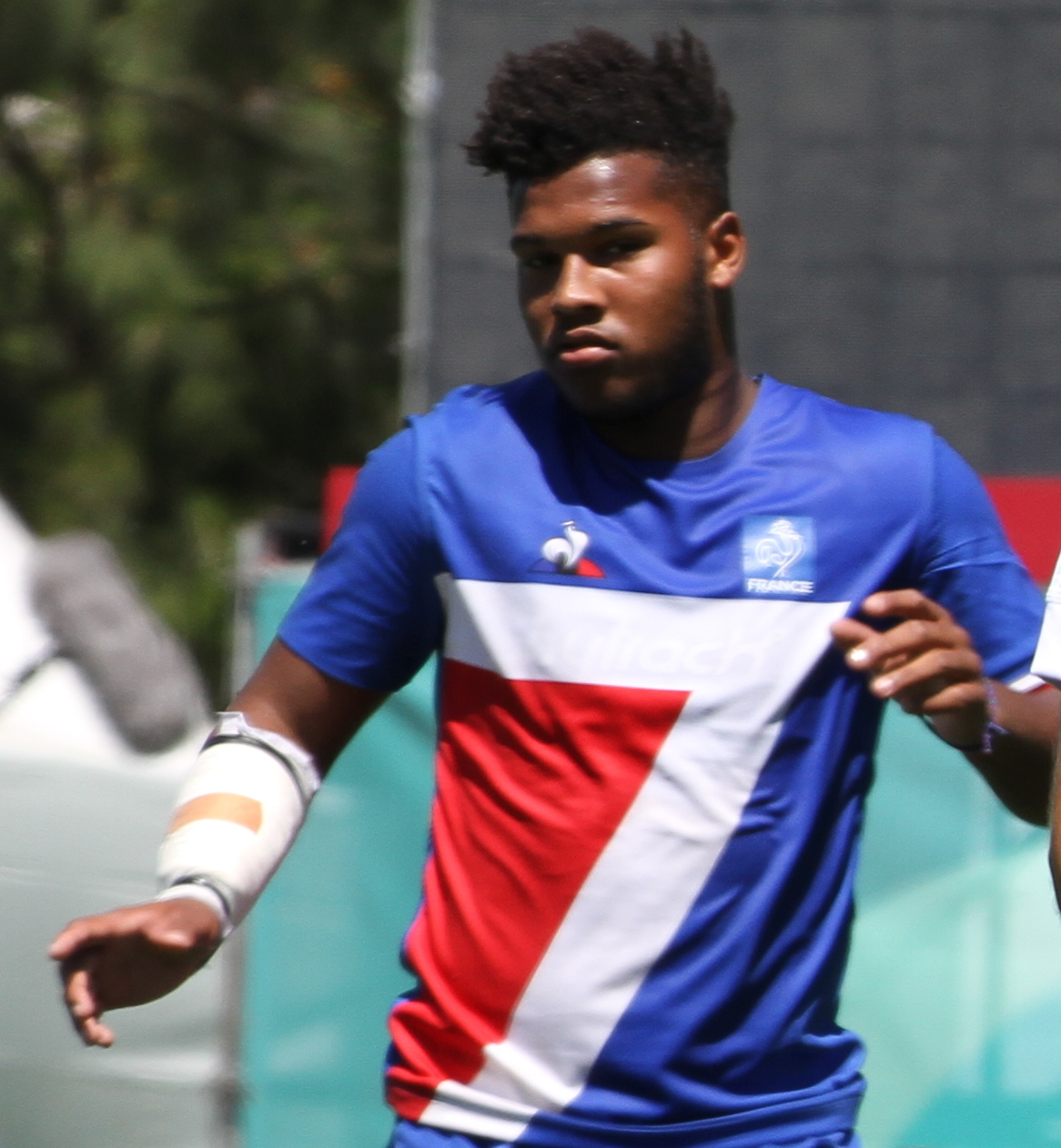
- Cheikh Tiberghien at the 2018 Summer Youth Olympics
- Born: Cheikh Tiberghien-Fall; 8 January 2000 (age 26)
- Height: 1.85 m (6 ft 1 in)
- Weight: 94 kg (14 st 11 lb)

Rugby union career
- Position: Fullback
- Current team: Bayonne
Senior career
Years	Team	Apps	(Points)
2019–2023	Clermont	59	(45)
2023–	Bayonne	13	(0)
- Correct as of 21 January 2024
International career
Years	Team	Apps	(Points)
2019-2020	France U20	4	(7)
- Correct as of 16 February 2020

Cheikh Tiberghien (born 8 January 2000) is a French professional rugby union player who plays as a fullback for Bayonne in the Top 14.

== Biography ==
Having played in junior categories with the Aviron Bayonnais, moved to ASM Clermont Auvergne in 2019.
