= Christie Grobbelaar =

South African international rugby union player

- Born: 25 May 2000 (age 26)
- Height: 192 cm (6 ft 4 in)
- Weight: 95 kg (209 lb)

Rugby union career
- Position: Wing
Senior career
| Years | Team | Apps | (Points) |
| 2024– | Sharks XV | 3 | (0) |
| 2025 | Sharks | 2 | (0) |
International career
| Years | Team | Apps | (Points) |
| 2020– | South Africa Sevens | | |
Medal record
Men's rugby sevens
Representing South Africa
Olympic Games
| Bronze medal – third place | 2024 Paris | Team competition |
Commonwealth Games
| Gold medal – first place | 2022 Birmingham | Team competition |
Africa Men's Sevens
| Silver medal – second place | 2024 Mauritius | Team competition |

Christie Grobbelaar (born 15 June 2000) is a South African rugby union player.

== Professional career ==
He competed for the South Africa national rugby sevens team at the 2022 Commonwealth Games in Birmingham, where South Africa won gold, and at the 2024 Summer Olympics in Paris, where they defeated Australia to win the bronze medal final.

Grobbelaar was named on the bench for the Sharks during the 2024 Currie Cup Premier Division, but did not ultimately make an appearance.

He was named in the Sharks squad for the 2025 Currie Cup Premier Division. Grobbelaar remained with the Sharks for the start of the 2025–26 United Rugby Championship and made his debut in the opening round against Glasgow Warriors, before being loaned back to the South African sevens team.

He was a try scorer in the final as South Africa won in Cape Town at the 2025 South Africa Sevens, part of the 2025–26 SVNS.

Grobbelaar returned to the Sharks for the 2026 Currie Cup.
