= Dawid Kellerman =

South African rugby union player

- Full name: Dawid Kellerman
- Born: South Africa
- School: Paarl Gimnasium

Rugby union career
- Position(s): Centre, Fly-half
- Current team: Honda Heat
Youth career
- 2018: Western Province
Senior career
Years	Team	Apps	(Points)
2021	Blue Bulls	1	(5)
2021	Bulls	0	(0)
2022–	Honda Heat	56	(114)
- Correct as of 13 September 2021

Dawid Kellerman is a South African rugby union player for the Blue Bulls in the Currie Cup. His regular position is centre.

Kellerman was named in the Blue Bulls side for their Round 7 match of the 2020–21 Currie Cup Premier Division against the Pumas. He made his debut in the same fixture, starting the match at inside centre.
