= Ignacio Mendy =

Argentine rugby union player

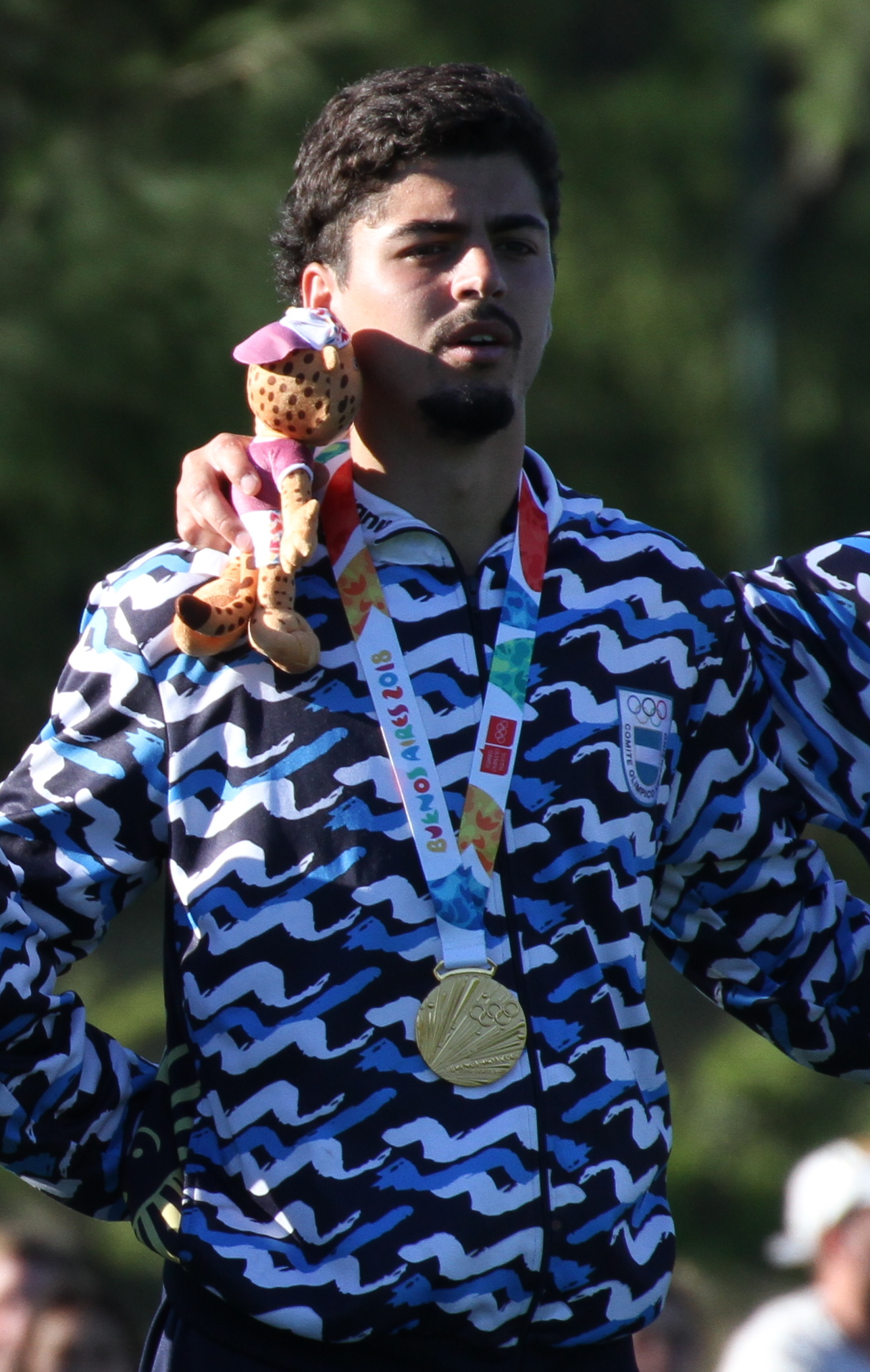
- Mendy at the 2018 Summer Youth Olympics
- Born: 29 June 2000 (age 26) Buenos Aires, Argentina
- Height: 187 cm (6 ft 2 in)
- Weight: 81 kg (179 lb; 12 st 11 lb)

Rugby union career
- Position: Fullback
- Current team: Benetton
Senior career
Years	Team	Apps	(Points)
2018−2022	Los Tilos	4	(0)
2019	Jaguares	0	(0)
2022	Jaguares XV	9	(40)
2022−	Benetton	57	(45)
International career
Years	Team	Apps	(Points)
2018–19	Argentina U20	7	(15)
2021−	Argentina	5	(20)
National sevens team
Years	Team		Comps
2018–2021	Argentina		2
Medal record
Men's rugby sevens
Representing Argentina
Olympic Games
Bronze medal – third place	2020 Tokyo	Team competition
Youth Olympic Games
Gold medal – first place	2018 Buenos Aires	Team competition

Ignacio Mendy (born 29 June 2000) is an Argentine professional rugby union player who plays for Benetton in United Rugby Championship. He made his debut appearance at the Olympics representing Argentina at the 2020 Summer Olympics. His playing position is fullback.

== Career ==
Mendy represented Argentina at the 2018 Summer Youth Olympics and was part of the Argentine team which whereas Argentina defeated France 24–14 in the final to claim the gold medal in the boys rugby sevens tournament. He was also named in Argentine senior rugby sevens squad for the 2018–19 World Rugby Sevens Series. On 28 December 2018, Mendy was named in the Jaguares squad for the 2019 Super Rugby season.

Mendy was also selected to Argentina squad to compete at the 2020 Summer Olympics in the men's rugby sevens tournament. He was also subsequently part of the Argentine side which claimed bronze medal after defeating Great Britain 17–12 in the third place match at the 2020 Summer Olympics. It was also the first ever Olympic medal for Argentina in rugby sevens.

In August 2021, he was named in Argentina squad for 2021 Rugby Championship. He made his debut on 21 August in 2021 Rugby Championship against South Africa.

In 2022, Mendy played for the Jaguares XV in Superliga Americana de Rugby.
