= Des Sepulona =

- Full name: Des Sepulona Faoa
- Born: 19 April 2001 (age 25)
- School: Leulumoega Fou College

Rugby union career
- Position: Scrum-half
International career
Years	Team	Apps	(Points)
2022–	Samoa	1	(0)

Des Sepulona Faoa (born 19 April 2001) is a Samoan rugby union player.

Sepulona picked up rugby while at primary school in Tuana'i and later attended Leulumoega Fou College. He plays his rugby for Salelologa and made the national training squad in 2020 as a 19-year old.

Primarily a halfback, Sepulona won a Samoa call up for their 2022 end-of-year internationals, making his debut in a win over Romania in Bucharest. He started playing with Samoa's rugby sevens team during the 2023–24 SVNS.

== See also ==
- List of Samoa national rugby union players
