= Joachim Trouabal =

French rugby player (born 2000)

- Born: 18 August 2000 (age 26)
- Height: 1.83 m (6 ft 0 in)
- Weight: 78 kg (172 lb)
- Notable relative: Jean-Charles Trouabal

Rugby union career
- Position: Winger
National sevens team
Years	Team	Comps
2018-	France 7s	

Joachim Trouabal (born 18 August 2000) is a French professional rugby union footballer who is an international for the France national rugby sevens team.

== Early life ==
He played a number of different sports growing up, including tennis, football, and judo. He ultimately chose rugby union and starting playing in the Paris region for Brétigny from 2008 to 2013, before training with Rugby Club Massy Essonne.

== Career ==
=== Rugby Union ===
He trained as a youngster at Top 14 club Racing 92 and played for France in Rugby Sevens at the 2018 Summer Youth Olympics. He made his debut for the senior France national rugby sevens team in Cape Town on December 9, 2018 against Samoa, during the 2018–19 World Rugby Sevens Series.

He continued to play for France Rugby Sevens in the 2021–22 World Rugby Sevens Series and was a member of the France Squad at the 2022 Rugby World Cup Sevens in South Africa.

He played for France in the 2022–23 World Rugby Sevens Series and 2023–24 SVNS, with his performances including a hat trick against Fiji in Toulouse in May 2023.

=== NFL ===
Following the end of his France Rugby Sevens contract he participated in the NFL International Combine in Loughborough, England in October 2024. In December 2024, he was announced as joining the NFL's International Player Pathway scheme.

== Personal life ==
His father is French international sprinter Jean-Charles Trouabal.
