= Judo at the 2018 Summer Youth Olympics – Mixed team =

Judo competition

Mixed team at the III Summer Youth Olympic Games
- Venue: Asia Pavilion
- Date: 10 October
- Competitors: 101

Medalists
1st place, gold medalist(s)		Artsiom Kolasau; Liu Li-ling; Jaykhunbek Nazarov; Carlos Páez; Itzel Pecha; Ana Viktorija Puljiz; Veronica Toniolo	Mixed-NOCs
2nd place, silver medalist(s)		Mireille Andriamifehy; Martin Bezděk; Juan Montealegre; Javier Peña Insausti; Christi Rose Pretorius; Tababi Devi Thangjam; Marin Visser; Anwar Zrhari	Mixed-NOCs
3rd place, bronze medalist(s)		Milana Charygulyyeva; Yassamine Djellab; Metka Lobnik; Erza Muminoviq; Abrek Naguchev; Fleury Nihozeko; Jamshed Sulaimoni; Sultan Zhenishbekov	Mixed-NOCs
3rd place, bronze medalist(s)		Noemi Huayhuameza Orneta; Rachel Krapman; Daniel Leutgeb; Edith Ortiz; Ahmed Rebahi; Bekarys Saduakas; João Santos	Mixed-NOCs

These are the results for the mixed team event at the 2018 Summer Youth Olympics.

== Results ==
Round of 16
Sydney	3
Rio de Janeiro	4
Atlanta	4
Barcelona	3
Los Angeles	5
Seoul	3
Beijing	5
Montreal	2
Moscow	4
Singapore	3

Quarterfinals
Rio de Janeiro	5
Atlanta	4
Los Angeles	3
Athens	5
Nanjing	3
Beijing	4
London	4
Moscow	3

Semifinals
Rio de Janeiro	3
Athens	5
Beijing	7
London	0

Final
Athens	3
Beijing	4

== Teams ==
Athens	Atlanta	Barcelona	Beijing
Mireille Andriamifehy (MAD); Martin Bezděk (CZE); Juan Montealegre (COL); Javier Peña Insausti (ESP); Christi Rose Pretorius (ZIM); Tababi Devi Thangjam (IND); Marin Visser (NED); Anwar Zrhari (MAR)	Tiguidanke Camara (GUI); Aleksa Georgieva (BUL); Vusala Karimova (AZE); Adrián Medero (PUR); Rok Pogorevc (SLO); Fatine Rzal (MAR); Adrian Şulcă (ROU); Antonio Tornal (DOM)	Margarita Gritsenko (KAZ); Jalen Kon Elijah (CMR); Sosorbaram Lkhagvasüren (MGL); Loreince Nanekoula (GAB); Nikol Pencue (COL); Mikaela Rojas (ARG); Mark van Dijk (NED)	Artsiom Kolasau (BLR); Liu Li-ling (TPE); Jaykhunbek Nazarov (UZB); Carlos Páez (VEN); Itzel Pecha (MEX); Ana Viktorija Puljiz (CRO); Veronica Toniolo (ITA)
London	Los Angeles	Montreal	Moscow
Noemi Huayhuameza Orneta (PER); Rachel Krapman (CAN); Daniel Leutgeb (AUT); Edith Ortiz (ECU); Ahmed Rebahi (ALG); Bekarys Saduakas (KAZ); João Santos (BRA); Yangchen Wangmo (BHU)	Nahomys Acosta Batte (CUB); Alin Bagrin (MDA); Georgios Balarjishvili (CYP); Soniya Bhatta (NEP); Saskia Brothers (AUS); Turpal Djoukaev (FIN); Raffaela Igl (GER); Ariel Shulman (ISR)	Rhys Allan (AUS); Kimy Bravo Blanco (CUB); Nemesis Candelo (PAN); Houda Faissal Abdourahman (DJI); Julián Gutiérrez (MEX); Szofi Ozbas (HUN); Ester Svobodová (CZE); Oleh Veredyba (UKR)	Augusta Ambourouet (GAB); Alessia Corrao (BEL); Temuujin Ganburged (MGL); Alexis Harrison Ayarza (PAN); Hamza Jashari (MKD); Paulina Țurcan (MDA); Zsombor Vég (HUN)
Nanjing	Rio de Janeiro	Seoul	Singapore
Hasret Bozkurt (TUR); Joaquín Burgos (ARG); Nilufar Ermaganbetova (UZB); Rihari Iki (NZL); Alaa Mousaad Mohamed (EGY); Eva Pérez Soler (ESP); Vugar Talibov (AZE); Romain Valadier-Picard (FRA)	Milana Charygulyyeva (TKM); Yassamine Djellab (ALG); Metka Lobnik (SLO); Erza Muminoviq (KOS); Abrek Naguchev (RUS); Fleury Nihozeko (BDI); Jamshed Sulaimoni (TJK); Sultan Zhenishbekov (KGZ)	Mohammed Al-Mishri (LBA); Alex Barto (SVK); Sairy Colón (PUR); María Giménez (VEN); Yuri Israelyan (ARM); Kim Ju-hee (KOR); Omaria Ramírez (DOM); Wu Xiao-zhang (TPE)	Ahad Al-Sagheer (YEM); Anastasia Balaban (UKR); Bryan Garboa (ECU); Sarah Kafufula (COD); Mariem Khlifi (TUN); Ahmed Mohamed Fahmy (EGY); Eduarda Rosa (BRA); Ilia Sulamanidze (GEO)
Sydney
Ömer Aydın (TUR); Fatime Barka Segue (CHA); Giorgia Hagianu (ROU); Irena Khubulova (RUS); Euclides Lopes (GBS); Shakhida Narmukhamedova (KGZ); Keagan Young (CAN); Simon Zulu (ZAM)
