= Chad at the 2018 Summer Youth Olympics =

- IOC code: CHA
- NOC: Comité Olympique et Sportif Tchadien

in Buenos Aires
- Competitors: 2 in 2 sports
- Medals: Gold 0 Silver 0 Bronze 0 Total 0

Summer Youth Olympics appearances
- 2010; 2014; 2018; 2026

Chad competed at the 2018 Summer Youth Olympics in Buenos Aires, Argentina from 6 October to 18 October 2018.

== Competitors ==
Sport	Boys	Girls	Total
Judo	0	1	1
Taekwondo	1	0	1

== Judo ==
Chad qualified one competitor for judo at the games.

Individual

Athlete	Event	Round of 16	Quarterfinals	Semifinals	Rep 1	Rep 2	Rep 3	Final / BM	Rank
Athlete	Event	Opposition Result	Opposition Result	Opposition Result	Opposition Result	Opposition Result	Opposition Result	Opposition Result	Rank
Fatime Barka Segue	Girls' -52 kg	Rzal (MAR); L 0s2-1	did not advance		—N/a	Colón (PUR); L 0-10	did not advance		9

Team

Athletes	Event	Round of 16	Quarterfinals	Semifinals	Final	Rank
Athletes	Event	Opposition Result	Opposition Result	Opposition Result	Opposition Result	Rank
Team Sydney; Giorgia Hagianu (ROU); Fatime Barka Segue (CHA); Irena Khubulova (RUS); Shakhida Narmukhamedova (KGZ); Euclides Lopes (GBS); Simon Zulu (ZAM); Keagan Young (CAN); Ömer Aydın (TUR)	Mixed Team	Team Rio de Janeiro (MIX); L 3–4	did not advance			9

== Taekwondo ==
Chad qualified one athlete for taekwondo at the games.

Athlete	Event	Round of 16	Quarterfinals	Semifinals	Final	
Athlete	Event	Opposition Result	Opposition Result	Opposition Result	Opposition Result	Rank
Casimir Djinodi	Boys −63 kg	Thepsen (THA); L 20–25	did not advance			9
