= Guinea-Bissau at the 2018 Summer Youth Olympics =

- IOC code: GBS
- NOC: Guinea-Bissau Olympic Committee
- Website: cogb.gw

in Buenos Aires, Argentina 6 – 18 October 2018
- Competitors: 2 in 2 sports
- Medals: Gold 0 Silver 0 Bronze 0 Total 0

Summer Youth Olympics appearances
- 2010; 2014; 2018; 2026

Guinea-Bissau participated at the 2018 Summer Youth Olympics in Buenos Aires, Argentina from 6 to 18 October 2018.

== Competitors ==
Sport	Boys	Girls	Total
Athletics	0	1	1
Judo	1	0	1
Total	1	1	2

== Athletics ==
Athlete	Event	Stage 1		Stage 2		Total	
Athlete	Event	Time	Rank	Time	Rank	Time	Rank
Famata Darame	Girls' 100 m	14.02	32	13.81	34	27.83	32

== Judo ==
Individual

Athlete	Event	Round of 16	Quarterfinals	Semifinals	Rep 1	Rep 2	Final / BM	Rank
Athlete	Event	Opposition Result	Opposition Result	Opposition Result	Opposition Result	Opposition Result	Opposition Result	Rank
Euclides Lopes	Boys' 55 kg	Daniel Leutgeb (AUT); L 00-10	did not advance		Bye	Romain Valadier-Picard (FRA); L 00s1-10	did not advance	

Team

Athletes	Event	Round of 16	Quarterfinals	Semifinals	Final	
Athletes	Event	Opposition Result	Opposition Result	Opposition Result	Opposition Result	Rank
Team Sydney; Giorgia Hagianu (ROU); Euclides Lopes (GBS); Irena Khubulova (RUS); Simon Zulu (ZAM); Fatime Barka Segue (CHA); Keagan Young (CAN); Shakhida Narmukhamedova (KGZ); Ömer Aydın (TUR)	Mixed team	Team Rio de Janeiro (MIX); L 4–3	did not advance			9
