= Cuba at the 2018 Summer Youth Olympics =

- IOC code: CUB
- NOC: Cuban Olympic Committee
- Website: https://www.olympic.org/cuba

in Buenos Aires, Argentina 6 – 18 October 2018
- Competitors: 19 in 7 sports
- Medals Ranked 16th: Gold 4 Silver 0 Bronze 2 Total 6

Summer Youth Olympics appearances
- 2010; 2014; 2018; 2026

Cuba participated at the 2018 Summer Youth Olympics in Buenos Aires, Argentina from 6 October to 18 October 2018.

== Medals ==
Medals awarded to participants of mixed-NOC (combined) teams are represented in italics. These medals are not counted towards the individual NOC medal tally.

Medal	Name	Sport	Event	Date
Gold	Lester Lescay	Athletics	Boys' long jump	15 October
Gold	Jordan Díaz	Athletics	Boys' triple jump	16 October
Gold	Melany Matheus	Athletics	Girls' discus throw	14 October
Gold	Milaimys de la Cari. Marín Potrille	Wrestling	Girls' freestyle −73kg	13 October
Bronze	Alegna Osorio Mayarí	Athletics	Girls' hammer throw	15 October
Bronze	Nahomys Acosta	Judo	Girls' 52 kg	8 October

Medals by sport
Sport	1st place, gold medalist(s)	2nd place, silver medalist(s)	3rd place, bronze medalist(s)	Total
Athletics	3	0	1	4
Judo	0	0	1	1
Wrestling	1	0	0	1
Total	4	0	2	6

== Archery ==
Cuba qualified one archer based on its performance at the American Continental Qualification Tournament.

Individual

Athlete	Event	Ranking round		Round of 32	Round of 16	Quarterfinals	Semifinals	Final / BM	Rank
Athlete	Event	Score	Seed	Opposition Score	Opposition Score	Opposition Score	Opposition Score	Opposition Score	Rank
Hazael Jesus Rodríguez Valero	Boys' Individual	660	19	Dalpatadu (SRI); L 5–6	did not advance				17

Team

Athletes	Event	Ranking round		Round of 32	Round of 16	Quarterfinals	Semifinals	Final / BM	Rank
Athletes	Event	Score	Seed	Opposition Score	Opposition Score	Opposition Score	Opposition Score	Opposition Score	Rank
Hazael Jesus Rodríguez Valero (CUB); Catalina GNoriega (USA)	Mixed team	1302	7	Kang (PRK); Vaca Cordero (MEX); L 0–6	did not advance				17

== Athletics ==
Boys
Field events

Athlete	Event	Stage 1		Stage 2		Total	
Athlete	Event	Result	Rank	Result	Rank	Total	Rank
Lester Lescay	Boys' long jump	7.65	2	7.89	1	15.54	1st place, gold medalist(s)
Jordan Díaz	Boys' triple jump	17.14	1	17.04	1	34.18	1st place, gold medalist(s)
Niesterle Alejand Castillo Castillo	Boys' shot put	18.66	6	18.54	7	37.20	7

Girls
Track and road events

Athlete	Event	Stage 1		Stage 2		Total	
Athlete	Event	Result	Rank	Result	Rank	Total	Rank
Keily Linet Pérez Ibáñez	Girls' 100 metre hurdles	13.96	6	13.49	6	27.45	6

Field events

Athlete	Event	Stage 1		Stage 2		Total	
Athlete	Event	Result	Rank	Result	Rank	Total	Rank
Rosaidi Robles Naranjo	Girls' pole vault	3.45	11	3.62	9	7.07	10
Zulia Hernández	Girls' triple jump	12.45	10	12.28	12	24.73	10
Melany Matheus	Girls' discus throw	53.70	1	54.95	1	108.65	1st place, gold medalist(s)
Alegna Osorio Mayarí	Girls' hammer throw	63.69	8	63.31	4	127.00	3rd place, bronze medalist(s)

== Beach volleyball ==
Cuba qualified a boys' team based on their performance at the 2018 Central Zone U19 Championship.

- Boys' tournament - 1 team of 2 athletes

Athletes	Event	Preliminary round		Round of 24	Round of 16	Quarterfinals	Semifinals	Final / BM	
Athletes	Event	Opposition Score	Rank	Opposition Score	Opposition Score	Opposition Score	Opposition Score	Opposition Score	Rank
Ayon; Alayo	Boys'	J Bello–Bello (GBR); L 1-2; Krovon–Ariyata (TOG); W 2-0; Jorge–Gonza (PAR); W 2-0	2	Santiago–Rivera (PUR); W 2-1	Veretiuk–Shekunov (RUS); W 2-1	Streli–Hajós (HUN); L 1-2	did not advance		

== Judo ==
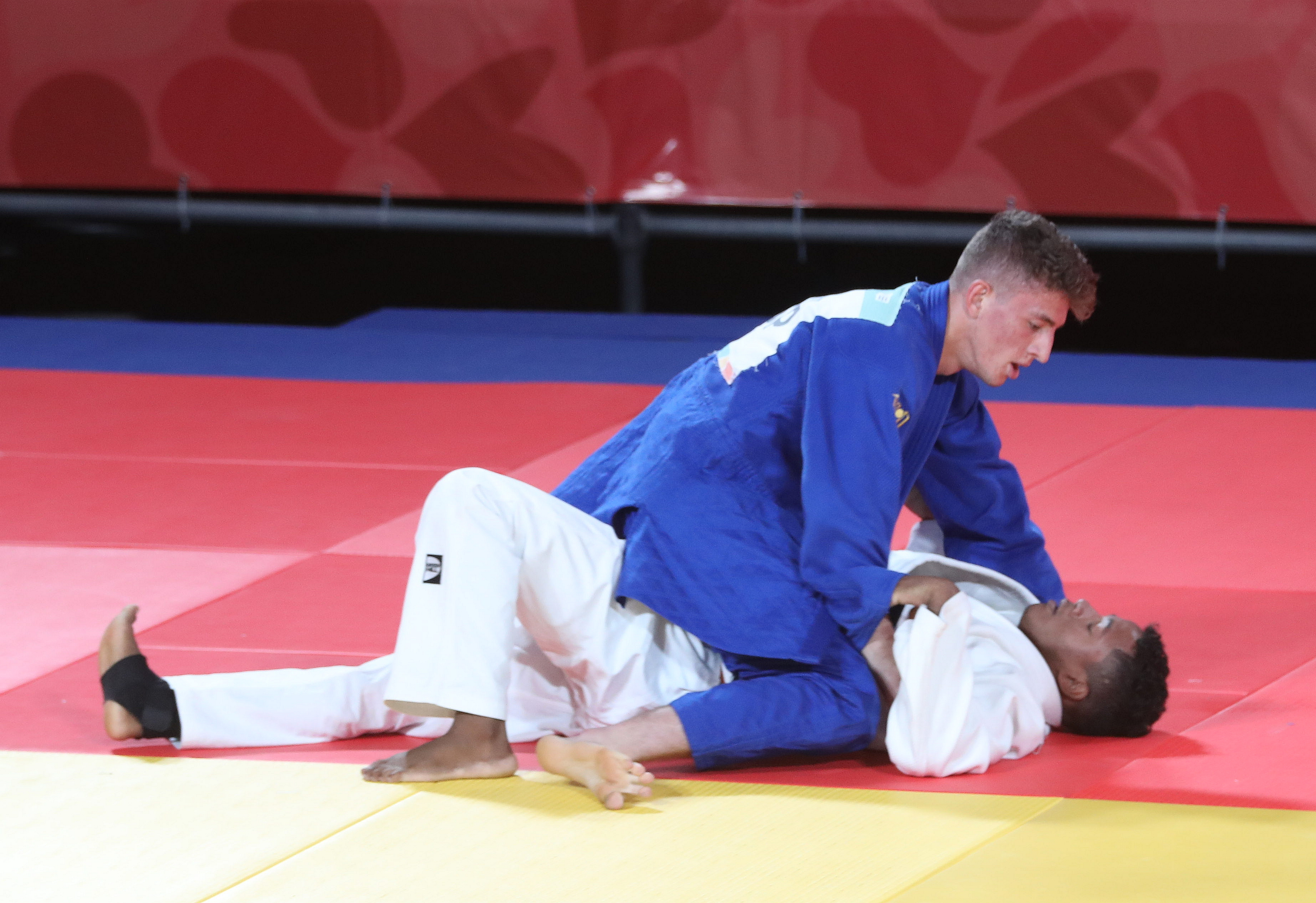
Bronze medal match: Kimy Bravo vs. Javier Peña (on top)

Individual

Athlete	Event	Preliminary round	Round of 16	Quarterfinals	Semifinals	Rep 1	Rep 2	Rep 3	Final / BM	
Athlete	Event	Opposition Result	Opposition Result	Opposition Result	Opposition Result	Opposition Result	Opposition Result	Opposition Result	Opposition Result	Rank
Kimy Bravo	Boys' 66 kg	João Santos (BRA); W 01-00s2	Antonio Tornal (DOM); L 00s1-10s1	did not advance		Loreince Nanekoula (GAB); W 10-00s2	Jamshed Sulaimoni (TJK); W 01s2-00s2	João Santos (BRA); W 01s2-00s2	Javier Peña (ESP); L 01-11	4
Nahomys Acosta	Girls' 52 kg	—N/a	Sosorbaram Lkhagvasüren (MGL); L 00-10	did not advance		Milana Charygulyyeva (TKM); W 10-00s1	Nemesis Candelo (PAN); W 10-00s1	Mireille Andriamifehy (MAD); W 10-00	Veronica Toniolo (ITA); W 01s1-00s1	3rd place, bronze medalist(s)

Team

Athletes	Event	Round of 16	Quarterfinals	Semifinals	Final	
Athletes	Event	Opposition Result	Opposition Result	Opposition Result	Opposition Result	Rank
Team Los Angeles; Soniya Bhatta (NEP); Ariel Shulman (ISR); Nahomys Acosta Batte (CUB); Turpal Djoukaev (FIN); Saskia Brothers (AUS); Georgios Balarjishvili (CYP); Raffaela Igl (GER); Alin Bagrin (MDA)	Mixed team	Team Seoul (MIX); W 5–3	Team Athens (MIX); L 3–5	did not advance		5
Team Montreal; Houda Faissal Abdourahman (DJI); Nemesis Candelo (PAN); Szofi Ozbas (HUN); Ester Svobodova (CZE); Oleh Veredyba (UKR); Kimy Bravo Blanco (CUB); Rhys Allan (AUS); Julian Gutierrez (MEX)	Mixed team	Team Beijing (MIX); L 2–5	did not advance			

== Rowing ==
Cuba qualified two boats based on its performance at the American Qualification Regatta.

- Boys' single sculls - 1 athlete
- Girls' single sculls - 1 athlete

== Triathlon ==
Cuba qualified one athlete based on its performance at the 2018 American Youth Olympic Games Qualifier.

Individual

Athlete	Event	Swim (750m)	Trans 1	Bike (20 km)	Trans 2	Run (5 km)	Total Time	Rank
Alejandro Rodríguez Díez	Boys	10:47	0:31	29:16	0:27	16:39	57:40	22
Niuska Figueredo Bringa	Girls	10:29	1:16	32:48	0:57	20:33	1:06:03	26

Relay

Athlete	Event	Total Times per Athlete (Swim 250m, Bike 6.6 km, Run 1.8 km)	Total Group Time	Rank
Americas 4 Niuska Figueredo Bringa (CUB); Pedro Boff da Silva (BRA); Enya Noel (GRN); Alejandro Rodríguez Díez (CUB)	Mixed Relay	24:22 (15); 22:05 (11); 26:21 (13); 23:29 (12)	1:36:17	12

== Wrestling ==
Key:
- VFA – Victory by Fall
- VSU – Without any points scored by the opponent
- VSU1 – With point(s) scored by the opponent
- VPO – Without any points scored by the opponent
- VPO1 – With point(s) scored by the opponent

Athlete	Event	Group stage					Final / RM	Rank
Athlete	Event	Opposition Score	Opposition Score	Opposition Score	Opposition Score	Rank	Opposition Score	Rank
Yetzis Camila Ramírez Marquez	Girls' freestyle −65kg	Capezan (ROU); L 0 – 11 ^{VSU}	Escamilla (MEX); W 2 – 1 ^{VPO1}	Tamir (MGL); L 0 – 5 ^{VFA}	Zhou (CHN); L 0 – 10 ^{VSU}	4 Q	Sghaier (TUN); L 1 – 1 ^{VPO1}	8
Milaimys de la Cari. Marín Potrille	Girls' freestyle −73kg	Kagami (JPN); W 4 – 1 ^{VPO1}	Fridlund (SWE); W 8 – 0 ^{VPO}	White (CAN); W 10 – 0 ^{VSU}	Ludgate (ASA); W 8 – 0 ^{VFA}	1 Q	Machuca (ARG); W 4 – 0 ^{VFA}	1st place, gold medalist(s)
