= Mongolia at the 2018 Summer Youth Olympics =

- IOC code: MGL
- NOC: Mongolian National Olympic Committee
- Website: http://www.olympic.mn/

in Buenos Aires, Argentina 6 – 18 October 2018
- Competitors: 11 in 6 sports
- Medals Ranked 67th: Gold 0 Silver 2 Bronze 1 Total 3

Summer Youth Olympics appearances
- 2010; 2014; 2018

Mongolia participated at the 2018 Summer Youth Olympics in Buenos Aires, Argentina from 6 October to 18 October 2018.

== Medalists ==
Medals awarded to participants of mixed-NOC (combined) teams are represented in italics. These medals are not counted towards the individual NOC medal tally.

Medal	Name	Sport	Event	Date
Gold	Erdenechuluuny Enkhmaa	Shooting	Mixed Team 10m Air Rifle	10 October
Silver	Ganbürgediin Temüüjin	Judo	Boys' 55 kg	7 October
Silver	Lkhagvasüren Sosorbaram	Judo	Girls' 52 kg	8 October
Bronze	Tamiryn Oyun-Erdene	Wrestling	Girls' freestyle −65kg	13 October

== Basketball ==
Mongolia qualified a boys' team based on the U18 3x3 National Federation Ranking.

- Boys' tournament – 1 team of 4 athletes

Event	Group stage					Quarterfinal	Semifinal	Final / BM	
Event	Opposition Score	Opposition Score	Opposition Score	Opposition Score	Rank	Opposition Score	Opposition Score	Opposition Score	Rank
Boys' tournament	Argentina; L 15–22	Russia; L 12–19	Estonia; L 13–22	United States; L 19–21	5	did not advance			17

== Judo ==
Individual

Athlete	Event	Round of 16	Quarterfinals	Semifinals	Repechage			Final / BM	
Athlete	Event	Round of 16	Quarterfinals	Semifinals	Round of 8	Quarterfinals	Semifinals	Final / BM	
Athlete	Event	Opposition Result	Opposition Result	Opposition Result	Opposition Result	Opposition Result	Opposition Result	Opposition Result	Rank
Ganbürgediin Temüüjin	Boys' 55 kg	—	Juan Montealegre (COL); W	Oleh Veredyba (UKR); W	—			Artsiom Kolasau (BLR); L	2nd place, silver medalist(s)
Sosorbaram Lkhagvasüren	Girls' 52 kg	Nahomys Acosta (CUB); W	Mireille Andriamifehy (MAD); W	Nilufar Ermaganbetova (UZB); W	—			Irena Khubulova (RUS); L	2nd place, silver medalist(s)

Team

Athletes	Event	Round of 16	Quarterfinals	Semifinals	Final	Rank
Athletes	Event	Opposition Result	Opposition Result	Opposition Result	Opposition Result	Rank
Team Barcelona; Margarita Gritsenko (KAZ); Jalen Kon Elijah (CMR); Sosorbaram Lkhagvasüren (MGL); Loreince Nanekoula (GAB); Nikol Pencue (COL); Mikaela Rojas (ARG); Mark van Dijk (NED); Peter Miles (GBR)	Mixed Team	Team Atlanta (MIX); L 3–4	did not advance			
Team Moscow; Augusta Ambourouet (GAB); Alessia Corrao (BEL); Ganbürgediin Temüüjin (MGL); Alexis Harrison Ayarza (PAN); Hamza Jashari (MKD); Paulina Țurcan (MDA); Zsombor Vég (HUN)	Mixed Team	Team Singapore (MIX); W 4–3	Team London (MIX); L 3–4	did not advance		

== Shooting ==
Individual

Athlete	Event	Qualification		Final	
Athlete	Event	Points	Rank	Points	Rank
Erdenechuluuny Enkhmaa	Girls' 10m Air Rifle	617.5	12	did not advance	

Team

Athletes	Event	Qualification		Round of 16	Quarterfinals	Semifinals	Final / BM	Rank
Athletes	Event	Points	Rank	Opposition Result	Opposition Result	Opposition Result	Opposition Result	Rank
Erdenechuluuny Enkhmaa (MGL); Zalán Pekler (HUN)	Mixed Team 10m Air Rifle	828.4	!Q	Hamid (BAN); Zhang (CHN); W 10–7	Volkart (ARG); Zolfagharian (IRI); W 10–9	Kemppi (FIN); Firmapaz (ARG); W 10–5	Dereviagina (RUS); Ramírez Ramos (MEX); W 10–9	1st place, gold medalist(s)

== Taekwondo ==
Athlete	Event	Round of 16	Quarterfinals	Semifinals	Final	
Athlete	Event	Opposition Result	Opposition Result	Opposition Result	Opposition Result	Rank
Pürevjalyn Düürenjargal	−48 kg	Mohammed Yasini (PLE); W 42–25	Ulugbek Rashitov (UZB); L 3–44	did not advance		=5

== Weightlifting ==
Mongolia qualified one athlete based on its performance at the 2018 Asian Youth Championships.

Athlete	Event	Snatch		Clean & jerk		Total	Rank
Athlete	Event	Result	Rank	Result	Rank	Total	Rank
Gombosürengiin Enerel	Girls' +63 kg	75	8	104	5	179	6

== Wrestling ==
Key:
- VFA – Victory by Fall
- VSU – Without any points scored by the opponent
- VSU1 – With point(s) scored by the opponent
- VPO – Without any points scored by the opponent
- VPO1 – With point(s) scored by the opponent

Athlete	Event	Group stage					Final / RM	Rank
Athlete	Event	Opposition Score	Opposition Score	Opposition Score	Opposition Score	Rank	Opposition Score	Rank
Tamiryn Oyun-Erdene	Girls' freestyle −65kg	Sandra Escamilla (MEX); W 4–1^{VFA}	Zhou Xinru (CHN); L 1–11^{VPO1}	Amina Capezan (ROU); W 4–2^{VPO1}	Yetzis Ramírez (CUB); W 4–2^{VFA}	2 Q	Sunmisola Balogun (NGR); W 15–4^{VPO1}	3rd place, bronze medalist(s)
Batbaataryn Enkhzul	Girls' freestyle 43 kg	Sara Mahmoud (EGY)} W 4–2^{VFA}	Maria Leorda (MDA); W 10–0^{VPO}	Ella Derry (NZL); Walkover	Simran (IND); L 1–2^{VPO}	2 Q	Shahana Nazarova (AZE); L 6–7^{VPO}	4
