= Madagascar at the 2018 Summer Youth Olympics =

- IOC code: MAD
- NOC: Comité Olympique Malgache

in Buenos Aires, Argentina 6 – 18 October 2018
- Competitors: 4 in 3 sports
- Medals: Gold 0 Silver 0 Bronze 0 Total 0

Summer Youth Olympics appearances
- 2010; 2014; 2018

Madagascar participated at the 2018 Summer Youth Olympics in Buenos Aires, Argentina from 6 October to 18 October 2018.

== Competitors ==
| Sport | Boys | Girls | Total |
|---|---|---|---|
| Athletics | 1 | 0 | 1 |
| Judo | 1 | 0 | 1 |
| Weightlifting | 1 | 1 | 2 |
| Total | 3 | 1 | 4 |

== Athletics ==
Track

| Athlete | Event | Stage 1 | | Stage 2 | | Final Placing |
| Athlete | Event | Result | Rank | Result | Rank | Final Placing |
|---|---|---|---|---|---|---|
| Christel Rakotomalala | Boys' 400m | 54.31 | 20 | 52.88 | 20 | 19 |

== Judo ==
Individual

| Athlete | Event | Round of 16 | Quarterfinals | Semifinals | Rep 1 | Rep 2 | Rep 3 | Final / BM | |
| Athlete | Event | Opposition Result | Opposition Result | Opposition Result | Opposition Result | Opposition Result | Opposition Result | Opposition Result | Rank |
|---|---|---|---|---|---|---|---|---|---|
| Mireille Andriamifehy | Girls' 52 kg | Milana Charygulyyeva (TKM); W 01s1-00s1 | Sosorbaram Lkhagvasüren (MGL); L 00-10 | did not advance | Bye | Sarah Kafufula (COD); W 10-00 | Nahomys Acosta (CUB); L 00-10 | did not advance | |

Team

| Athletes | Event | Round of 16 | Quarterfinals | Semifinals | Final | |
| Athletes | Event | Opposition Result | Opposition Result | Opposition Result | Opposition Result | Rank |
|---|---|---|---|---|---|---|
| Team Athens; Mireille Andriamifehy (MAD); Martin Bezděk (CZE); Juan Montealegre (COL); Javier Peña Insausti (ESP); Christi Rose Pretorius (ZIM); Tababi Devi Thangjam (IND); Marin Visser (NED); Anwar Zrhari (MAR) | Mixed team | Bye | Team Los Angeles (MIX); W 5–3 | Team Rio de Janeiro (MIX); W 5–3 | Team Beijing (MIX); L 4–5 | 2nd place, silver medalist(s) |

== Weightlifting ==
Madagascar was given a quota by the tripartite committee to compete in weightlifting.

Boy

| Athlete | Event | Snatch | | Clean & Jerk | | Total | Rank |
| Athlete | Event | Result | Rank | Result | Rank | Total | Rank |
|---|---|---|---|---|---|---|---|
| Miharintsoa Jose Rajaona | −56 kg | 85 | 6 | 110 | 5 | 195 | 6 |

Girls

| Athlete | Event | Snatch | | Clean & jerk | | Total | Rank |
| Athlete | Event | Result | Rank | Result | Rank | Total | Rank |
|---|---|---|---|---|---|---|---|
| Berthine Ravakiniaina | −44 kg | 40 | 5 | 50 | 5 | 90 | 5 |
