= Panama at the 2018 Summer Youth Olympics =

- IOC code: PAN
- NOC: Panama Olympic Committee

in Buenos Aires, Argentina 6 – 18 October 2018
- Competitors: 16
- Medals: Gold 0 Silver 0 Bronze 0 Total 0

Summer Youth Olympics appearances
- 2010; 2014; 2018; 2026

Panama participated at the 2018 Summer Youth Olympics in Buenos Aires, Argentina from 6 October to 18 October 2018.

== Equestrian ==
Panama qualified a rider based on its ranking in the FEI World Jumping Challenge Rankings.

- Individual Jumping - 1 athlete

Athlete	Horse	Event	Round 1		Round 2			Total		Jump off		
Athlete	Horse	Event	Penalties	Rank	Penalties	Total	Rank	Penalties	Rank	Penalties	Total	Rank
Marissa del Pilar Thompson	Canal Del Bajo Kithira	Individual Jumping	0	1	8	8	15	8	15	did not advance		
North America; Nicole Meyer Robredo (MEX); Mateo Philippe Coles (HAI); Marissa del Pilar Thompson (PAN); Pedro Espinosa (HON); Mattie Hatcher (USA)	El Capricho Champion; Quid Du Plessis; Canal Del Bajo Kithira; Llavaneras Genquina; Santa Rosa Valery	Team Jumping	4 # 0; 0; 0; 0 #	0	4 # 0; 0; 4 # 0	0	0	4 # 0 # 0; 0; 0	0	38.07 # 34.55 # 34.07; 32.16; 31.66	97.89	1st place, gold medalist(s)

== Futsal ==
=== Boys' tournament ===
Group stage

Pos	Team	Pld	W	D	L	GF	GA	GD	Pts	Qualification
1	Egypt	4	3	1	0	15	8	+7	10	Semi-finals
2	Argentina (H)	4	2	1	1	19	8	+11	7	Semi-finals
3	Iraq	4	2	1	1	12	5	+7	7	
4	Slovakia	4	1	0	3	5	12	−7	3	
5	Panama	4	0	1	3	7	25	−18	1	

Source: FIFA IOC
(H) Hosts
7 October 2018
18:00

Panama	1–1	Iraq
Ogilvie 29'	Report (FIFA); Report (IOC) Category:Futsal at the 2018 Summer Youth Olympics – Boys First Round – PAN-IRQ on Wikimedia Commons	Alaa 32'

Tecnópolis
Attendance: 3,600
Referee: Ricardo Amaral (Brazil)

9 October 2018
20:00

Egypt	8–3	Panama
El-Sayed 5', 16', 27'; Talaat 15'; Mohsen 25', 32'; Morsy 28'; Abdelmagid 38'	Report (FIFA); Report (IOC)	Arévalo 20', 21'; Victoria 35'

Tecnópolis
Attendance: 1,200
Referee: Hussain Al-Bahhar (Bahrain)

11 October 2018
20:00

Slovakia	4–1	Panama
Koricina 4', 33'; Bačo 12', 16'	Report (FIFA); Report (IOC)	Ogilvie 22'

Tecnópolis
Attendance: 985
Referee: Valeria Palma (Chile)

13 October 2018
20:00

Panama	2–12	Argentina
Ogilvie 4'; Agrazal 19'	Report (FIFA); Report (IOC)	Gassman 5', 10', 13', 19', 23', 25'; Rufino 11'; Ramírez 16', 26'; Raggiati 34'; Hernández 36'; De Candia 40' (pen.)

Tecnópolis
Attendance: 6,500
Referee: Khalid Hnich (Morocco)

== Judo ==
Individual

Athlete	Event	Round of 16	Quarterfinals	Semifinals	Rep 1	Rep 2	Rep 3	Final / BM	
Athlete	Event	Opposition Result	Opposition Result	Opposition Result	Opposition Result	Opposition Result	Opposition Result	Opposition Result	Rank
Alexis Harrison	Boys' 81 kg	Bye	Alex Barto (SVK); L 00-01s2	did not advance	Rihari Iki (NZL); L 00-010	did not advance			
Nemesis Candelo	Girls' 52 kg	Sarah Kafufula (COD); W 10s1-00s3	Nilufar Ermaganbetova (UZB); L 00s2-10s2	did not advance	Bye	Nahomys Acosta (CUB); L 00s1-10	did not advance		

Team

Athletes	Event	Round of 16	Quarterfinals	Semifinals	Final	Rank
Athletes	Event	Opposition Result	Opposition Result	Opposition Result	Opposition Result	Rank
Team Moscow; Augusta Ambourouet (GAB); Alessia Corrao (BEL); Temuujin Ganburged (MGL); Alexis Harrison Ayarza (PAN); Hamza Jashari (MKD); Paulina Țurcan (MDA); Zsombor Vég (HUN)	Mixed Team	Team Singapore (MIX); W 4–3	Team London (MIX); L 3–4	did not advance		
Team Montreal; Houda Faissal Abdourahman (DJI); Nemesis Candelo (PAN); Szofi Ozbas (HUN); Ester Svobodova (CZE); Oleh Veredyba (UKR); Kimy Bravo Blanco (CUB); Rhys Allan (AUS); Julian Gutierrez (MEX)	Mixed Team	Team Beijing (MIX); L 2–5	did not advance			

== Weightlifting ==
Athlete	Event	Snatch		Clean & Jerk		Total	Rank
Athlete	Event	Result	Rank	Result	Rank	Total	Rank
Ronnier Martinez	−62 kg	114	6	141	4	255	6
