= Puerto Rico at the 2018 Summer Youth Olympics =

- IOC code: PUR
- NOC: Puerto Rico Olympic Committee
- Website: http://www.copur.pr/

in Buenos Aires, Argentina 6 – 18 October 2018
- Competitors: 22 in 10 sports
- Flag bearer: Adriana Díaz
- Medals Ranked 71st: Gold 0 Silver 1 Bronze 2 Total 3

Summer Youth Olympics appearances
- 2010; 2014; 2018; 2026

Puerto Rico participated at the 2018 Summer Youth Olympics in Buenos Aires, Argentina from 6 October to 18 October 2018.

== Medalists ==
Medal	Name	Sport	Event	Date
Silver	Jorge Contreras	Athletics	Boys' discus throw	14 October
Bronze	Jan Moreu	Athletics	Boys' 5000 metre walk	15 October
Bronze	Alvin Canales	Boxing	-91 kg	17 October

Medals by sport
Sport	1st place, gold medalist(s)	2nd place, silver medalist(s)	3rd place, bronze medalist(s)	Total
Athletics	0	1	1	2
Boxing	0	0	1	1

== Athletics (track and field) ==
Athlete	Event	Stage 1		Stage 2		Total	
Athlete	Event	Result	Rank	Result	Rank	Total	Rank
Carlos Vilches	Boys' 1500 metres	4:05.93	16	12:32	9	25	13
Jan Moreu	Boys' 5000 metre walk	21:05.25	7	20:54.04	3	41:59.29	3rd place, bronze medalist(s)
Jorge Contreras	Boys' discus throw	55.99	3	59.07	4	115.06	2nd place, silver medalist(s)

== Beach volleyball ==
Puerto Rico qualified a boys' and girls' team based on their performance at the 2018 Central Zone U19 Championship.

- Boys' tournament – Randall Santiago and William Rivera
- Girls' tournament – Allanis Navas and María González

Athlete	Event	Group stage		Round of 24	Round of 16	Quarterfinal	Semifinal	Final / BM	Rank
Athlete	Event	Opposition Score	Rank	Opposition Score	Opposition Score	Opposition Score	Opposition Score	Opposition Score	Rank
Navas–Gonzalez	Girls' tournament	Ravo–Tebeim (VAN); W 2–0; Giuli–Romi (PAR); W 2–0; Scampoli–Bertozzi (ITA); L 0–2	2	Sinaportar–Mucheza (MOZ); W 2–0	Nicole–Canedo (BOL); W 2–0	Voronina–Bocharova (RUS); L 0–2	Did not advance		
Santiago–Rivera	Boys' tournament	Guvu–Monjane (MOZ); L 1–2; Leon–Jurado (ECU); L 1–2; Esther–Namah (MRI); W 2–0	3	Ayon–Alayo (CUB); L 1–2	Did not advance				

== Boxing ==
Boys

Athlete	Event	Preliminary R1	Preliminary R2	Semifinals	Final / RM	Rank
Athlete	Event	Opposition Result	Opposition Result	Opposition Result	Opposition Result	Rank
Jancarmelo Morales	-81 kg	Itauma (GBR); L 0–5	Ali Karar (EGY); L 0–5	Did not advance	Mousavipaeindezaei (IRI); W WO	5
Alvin Canales	-91 kg	Salgado (CHI); W 5–0	—N/a	Oralbay (KAZ); L 0–5	Mikušťák (CZE); W 5–0	3rd place, bronze medalist(s)

== Fencing ==
Puerto Rico qualified one athlete based on its performance at the 2018 Cadet World Championship.

- Boys' Sabre – Hudson Santana

== Gymnastics ==
=== Acrobatic ===
Puerto Rico qualified a mixed pair based on its performance at the 2018 Acrobatic Gymnastics World Championship.

- Mixed pair – Adriel Gónzalez and Daniela González

=== Artistic ===
Puerto Rico qualified two gymnasts based on its performance at the 2018 American Junior Championship.

- Boys' artistic individual all-around – Michael Torres
- Girls' artistic individual all-around – Kryxia Alicea

== Judo ==
Individual

Athlete	Event	Round of 16	Quarterfinals	Semifinals	Repechage		Final / BM	Rank
Athlete	Event	Round of 16	Quarterfinals	Semifinals	Quarterfinals	Semifinals	Final / BM	Rank
Athlete	Event	Opposition Result	Opposition Result	Opposition Result	Opposition Result	Opposition Result	Opposition Result	Rank
Adrián Medero	Boys' 55 kg	Romain Valadier-Picard (FRA); L 00-10	Did not advance		Aleddine Ben Chalbi (TUN); L 00-11s1	Did not advance		9
Sairy Colón	Girls' 52 kg	Augusta Ambourouet (GAB); W 11-00	Veronica Toniolo (ITA); L 00s1-10s1	Did not advance	Fatime Barka (CHA); W 10-00	Noemí Huayhuameza (PER); W 11-00	Nilufar Ermaganbetova (UZB); L 00-10	5

Team

Athletes	Event	Round of 16	Quarterfinals	Semifinals	Final	
Athletes	Event	Opposition Result	Opposition Result	Opposition Result	Opposition Result	Rank
Team Atlanta; Tiguidanke Camara (GUI); Aleksa Georgieva (BUL); Vusala Karimova (AZE); Adrián Medero (PUR); Rok Pogorevc (SLO); Fatine Rzal (MAR); Adrian Sulca (ROU); Antonio Tornal (DOM)	Mixed team	Team Barcelona (MIX); W 4–3	Team Barcelona (MIX); L 3–4	Did not advance		
Seoul; Mohammed Al-Mishri (LBA); Alex Barto (SVK); Sairy Colón (PUR); María Giménez (VEN); Yuri Israelyan (ARM); Kim Ju-hee (KOR); Omaria Ramírez (DOM); Wu Xiao-zhang (TPE)	Mixed Team	Los Angeles; L 3–5	did not advance			9

== Karate ==
Puerto Rico qualified one athlete based on its performance at one of the Karate Qualification Tournaments.

- Girls' +59kg – Janessa Fonseca

Athlete	Event	Elimination round				Semifinal	Final / BM	
Athlete	Event	Opposition Score	Opposition Score	Opposition Score	Rank	Opposition Score	Opposition Score	Rank
Janessa Fonseca	Girls' +59 kg	Sawashima (JPN); L 0–3	Lyck (DEN); W 2–0	Altooni (IRI); D 0–0	3	Did not advance		6

== Table tennis ==
Puerto Rico qualified one table tennis player based on its performance at the Latin American Continental Qualifier.

- Girls' singles – Adriana Díaz

== Weightlifting ==
Boy

Athlete	Event	Snatch		Clean & Jerk		Total	Rank
Athlete	Event	Result	Rank	Result	Rank	Total	Rank
Delvin Rocco Baez Moyeno	+85 kg	110	7	135	7	245	7

Girl

Athlete	Event	Snatch		Clean & jerk		Total	Rank
Athlete	Event	Result	Rank	Result	Rank	Total	Rank
Adamaris Santiago	−44 kg	55	4	73	4	128	4
