= Djibouti at the 2018 Summer Youth Olympics =

- IOC code: DJI
- NOC: Comité National Olympique Djiboutien

in Buenos Aires
- Competitors: 5 in 3 sports
- Medals: Gold 0 Silver 0 Bronze 0 Total 0

Summer Youth Olympics appearances
- 2010; 2014; 2018

Djibouti competed at the 2018 Summer Youth Olympics in Buenos Aires, Argentina from 6 October to 18 October 2018.

== Competitors ==
Djibouti qualified 5 competitors for the games.

Sport	Boys	Girls	Total
Athletics	3	0	3
Judo	0	1	1
Taekwondo	0	1	1

== Athletics ==
Djibouti qualified 3 male athletes to compete in athletics at the games.

Boys

Athlete	Event	Stage 1		Stage 2		Total	
Athlete	Event	Result	Rank	Result	Rank	Total	Rank
Hamze Ali Hassan	800 m	1:51.12	5	1:51.55	5	3:02.67	6
Nabil Mahdi Djama	1500 m	3:55.04	5	11:53	6	15:08.04	4
Farhan Mohamed Ibrahim	2000 m steeplechase	DQ		12:22	25	DQ	

== Judo ==
Djibouti qualified one female competitor for the games.

Individual

Athlete	Event	Round of 16	Quarterfinals	Semifinals	Rep 1	Rep 2	Rep 3	Final / BM	Rank
Athlete	Event	Opposition Result	Opposition Result	Opposition Result	Opposition Result	Opposition Result	Opposition Result	Opposition Result	Rank
Houda Faissal Abdourahman	Girls' -44 kg	Rojas (ARG); L 0-10	Did not advance		—N/a	Pérez Soler (ESP); L 0-10	—N/a	Did not advance	9

Team

Athletes	Event	Round of 16	Quarterfinals	Semifinals	Final	Rank
Athletes	Event	Opposition Result	Opposition Result	Opposition Result	Opposition Result	Rank
Team Montreal; Houda Faissal Abdourahman (DJI); Nemesis Candelo (PAN); Szofi Ozbas (HUN); Ester Svobodova (CZE); Oleh Veredyba (UKR); Kimy Bravo Blanco (CUB); Rhys Allan (AUS); Julian Gutierrez (MEX)	Mixed Team	Team Beijing (MIX); L 2–5	Did not advance			

== Taekwondo ==
Djibouti qualified one female competitor in taekwondo.

Athlete	Event	Round of 16	Quarterfinals	Semifinals	Final	
Athlete	Event	Opposition Result	Opposition Result	Opposition Result	Opposition Result	Rank
Safa Ismael Aden	Girls' −44 kg	Momenzadeh (IRI); L 0–32	Did not advance			
