= Democratic Republic of the Congo at the 2018 Summer Youth Olympics =

- IOC code: COD
- NOC: Comité Olympique Congolais

in Buenos Aires
- Competitors: 5 in 4 sports
- Flag bearer: Dante Cittadini
- Medals: Gold 0 Silver 0 Bronze 0 Total 0

Summer Youth Olympics appearances
- 2010; 2014; 2018

The Democratic Republic of the Congo competed at the 2018 Summer Youth Olympics in Buenos Aires, Argentina from 6 October to 18 October 2018.

== Competitors ==
Sport	Boys	Girls	Total
Athletics	0	1	1
Beach volleyball	0	2	2
Judo	0	1	1
Taekwondo	1	0	1

== Athletics ==
One athlete qualified for the games.

Girls

Athlete	Event	Stage 1		Stage 2		Total	
Athlete	Event	Result	Rank	Result	Rank	Total	Rank
Bernadette Bingonda	Girls' 3000 m	10:35.97	18	14:53	42	25:28.97	15

== Beach volleyball ==
Girls

Athletes	Event	Preliminary round		Round of 24	Round of 16	Quarterfinals	Semifinals	Final / BM	
Athletes	Event	Opposition Score	Rank	Opposition Score	Opposition Score	Opposition Score	Opposition Score	Opposition Score	Rank
Dorcas Mianda Ania; Nathalie Kutekemen Bijimine	Girls'	Dickson–Otene (NZL); L 0–2; Nogales–Canedo (BOL); L 0–2 van Driel–Schoon (NED); L 0–2	25	Did not advance					

== Judo ==
1 athlete qualified for judo at the games.

Individual

Athlete	Event	Round of 16	Quarterfinals	Semifinals	Rep 1	Rep 2	Rep 3	Final / BM	Rank
Athlete	Event	Opposition Result	Opposition Result	Opposition Result	Opposition Result	Opposition Result	Opposition Result	Opposition Result	Rank
Sarah Kafufula	Girls' -52 kg	Candelo (PAN); L 0s3-10s1	Did not advance		—	Andriamifehy (MAD); L 0-10	—	Did not advance	9

Team

Athletes	Event	Round of 16	Quarterfinals	Semifinals	Final	Rank
Athletes	Event	Opposition Result	Opposition Result	Opposition Result	Opposition Result	Rank
Team Singapore; Anastasiia Balaban (UKR); Sarah Kafufula (COD); Mariem Khlifi (TUN); Eduarda Rosa (BRA); Bryan Garboa (ECU); Ahad Al-Sagheer (YEM); Ahmed Mohamed Fahmy (EGY); Ilia Sulamanidze (GEO)	Mixed Team	Team Moscow (MIX); L 3–4	Did not advance			

== Taekwondo ==
Boys

Athlete	Event	Round of 16	Quarterfinals	Semifinals	Final	
Athlete	Event	Opposition Result	Opposition Result	Opposition Result	Opposition Result	Rank
Charly Kapashika Lutumba	Boys −73 kg	Sofotasios (GRE); L 4–26	Did not advance			
