= Judo at the 2018 Summer Youth Olympics – Girls' 52 kg =

Judo competition

Girls' 52 kg at the III Summer Youth Olympic Games
- Venue: Asia Pavilion
- Date: 8 October
- Competitors: 14 from 14 nations

Medalists
1st place, gold medalist(s)		Irena Khubulova; Russia
2nd place, silver medalist(s)		Sosorbaram Lkhagvasüren; Mongolia
3rd place, bronze medalist(s)		Nahomys Acosta; Cuba
3rd place, bronze medalist(s)		Nilufar Ermaganbetova; Uzbekistan

The Girls' 52 kg competition at the 2018 Summer Youth Olympics was held on 8 October, at the Asia Pavilion.

== Schedule ==
All times are in local time (UTC-3).

Date	Time	Round
Sunday, 8 October 2018	10:00; 11:00; 11:00; 12:00; 15:00	Round of 16; Quarterfinals; Repechage Rounds; Semifinals; Finals

== Results ==
Legend

- 1st number — Ippon
- 2nd number — Waza-ari
- s — Shido

=== Main Bracket ===
Round of 16
Sarah Kafufula (COD)	00s3
Nemesis Candelo (PAN)	10s1
Nahomys Acosta (CUB)	00
Sosorbaram Lkhagvasüren (MGL)	10
Mireille Andriamifehy (MAD)	01s1
Milana Charygulyyeva (TKM)	00s1
Fatime Barka (CHA)	00s2
Fatine Rzal (MAR)	01
Veronica Toniolo (ITA)	10
Noemí Huayhuameza (PER)	00s2
Sairy Colón (PUR)	11
Augusta Ambourouet (GAB)	00

Quarterfinals
Nilufar Ermaganbetova (UZB)	10s1
Nemesis Candelo (PAN)	00s2
Sosorbaram Lkhagvasüren (MGL)	10
Mireille Andriamifehy (MAD)	00
Irena Khubulova (RUS)	10
Fatine Rzal (MAR)	00s1
Veronica Toniolo (ITA)	10s1
Sairy Colón (PUR)	00s1

Semifinals
Nilufar Ermaganbetova (UZB)	00s1
Sosorbaram Lkhagvasüren (MGL)	10
Irena Khubulova (RUS)	10
Veronica Toniolo (ITA)	00

Finals
Sosorbaram Lkhagvasüren (MGL)	00
Irena Khubulova (RUS)	10

=== Repechage ===
Repechage 1
Nahomys Acosta (CUB)	10
Milana Charygulyyeva (TKM)	00s1
Noemí Huayhuameza (PER)	10
Augusta Ambourouet (GAB)	00

Repechage 2
Sarah Kafufula (COD)	00
Mireille Andriamifehy (MAD)	10
Nahomys Acosta (CUB)	10
Nemesis Candelo (PAN)	00s1
Fatime Barka (CHA)	00
Sairy Colón (PUR)	10
Noemí Huayhuameza (PER)	01s2
Fatine Rzal (MAR)	00s1

Repechage 3
Mireille Andriamifehy (MAD)	00
Nahomys Acosta (CUB)	10
Sairy Colón (PUR)	10
Noemí Huayhuameza (PER)	00

Bronze Medal Finals
Nahomys Acosta (CUB)	01s1
Veronica Toniolo (ITA)	00s1
Sairy Colón (PUR)	00
Nilufar Ermaganbetova (UZB)	10
