= Judo at the 2018 Central American and Caribbean Games =

Judo competition

- Venue: Coliseo Colegio Marymount
- Location: (Colombia) Barranquilla
- Dates: 30 July – 2 August

The judo competition at the 2018 Central American and Caribbean Games was held in Barranquilla, Colombia from 30 July to 2 August at the Coliseo Colegio Marymount.

== Medal summary ==
=== Men's events ===
Event	Gold	Silver	Bronze
−55 kg	Samuel Lameda (VEN)	Moisés Rosado (MEX)	Luis Montes (NCA); Yandry Torres (CUB)
−60 kg	Julio Molina (GUA)	Elmert Ramírez (DOM)	Johan Rojas (COL); Roberto Almenares (CUB)
−66 kg	Oniel Solís (CUB)	Ricardo Valderrama (VEN)	Wander Mateo (DOM); Carlos Rodríguez (PUR)
−73 kg	Magdiel Estrada (CUB)	Augusto Miranda (PUR)	Leider Navarro (COL); Sergio Mattey (VEN)
−81 kg	Medickson del Orbe (DOM)	Adrián Gandía (PUR)	Jorge Martínez (CUB); Pedro Castro (COL)
−90 kg	Iván Silva (CUB)	Robert Florentino (DOM)	Antony Peña (VEN); Francisco Balanta (COL)
−100 kg	Lewis Medina (DOM)	José Armenteros (CUB)	Luis Amézquita (VEN); Alexis Chiclana (PUR)
+100 kg	Andy Granda (CUB)	José Nova (DOM)	José Cuevas (MEX); Pedro Pineda (VEN)
Team	Cuba (CUB); Oniel Solís; Magdiel Estrada; Jorge Martínez; Iván Silva; Andy Granda	Venezuela (VEN); Pedro Pineda; Antony Peña; Noel Peña; Sergio Mattey; Ricardo Valderrama	Mexico (MEX); Eduardo Araújo; Samuel Ayala; Víctor Ochoa; José Ruiz; José Cuevas Dominican Republic (DOM); Wander Mateo; Lwilli Santana; Medickson del Orbe; Robert Florentino; José Nova; Lewis Medina

=== Women's events ===
Event	Gold	Silver	Bronze
−44 kg	Estefania Soriano (DOM)	Erika Lasso (COL)	Daniela Rodríguez (MEX); María Giménez (VEN)
−48 kg	Edna Carrillo (MEX)	Melissa Hurtado (CUB)	Luz Álvarez (COL); Paola García (PUR)
−52 kg	Kristine Jiménez (PAN)	Luz Olvera (MEX)	Diana de Jesús (DOM); Nahomys Acosta (CUB)
−57 kg	Miryam Roper (PAN)	Anailys Dorvigny (CUB)	Jennifer Cruz (MEX); Wisneybi Machado (VEN)
−63 kg	Anriquelis Barrios (VEN)	Cindy Mera (COL)	Maylín del Toro (CUB); Katherine Otaño (DOM)
−70 kg	Elvismar Rodríguez (VEN)	Leslie Villarreal (MEX)	Onix Cortés (CUB); María Pérez (PUR)
−78 kg	Kaliema Antomarchi (CUB)	Karen León (VEN)	Eiraima Silvestre (DOM); Debanhi Ochoa (MEX)
+78 kg	Idalys Ortiz (CUB)	Melissa Mojica (PUR)	Mariannys Hernández (VEN); Moira Morillo (DOM)
Team	Cuba (CUB); Nahomys Acosta; Anailys Dorvigny; Maylín del Toro; Onix Cortés; Idalys Ortiz; Melissa Hurtado; Kaliema Antomarchi	Venezuela (VEN); Karen León; Elvismar Rodríguez; Anriquelis Barrios; Mariannys Hernández; Wisneybi Machado	Mexico (MEX); Jennifer Cruz; Andrea Gutiérrez; Leslie Villarreal; Debanhi Ochoa; Luz Olvera; Melanie Bolaños Puerto Rico (PUR); Francin Echevarría; Keliz Rivera; Paola Santana; María Pérez; Melissa Mojica

== Medal table ==
* Host nation (Colombia)

Rank	Nation	Gold	Silver	Bronze	Total
1	Cuba (CUB)	8	3	6	17
2	Venezuela (VEN)	3	4	7	14
3	Dominican Republic (DOM)	3	3	6	12
4	Panama (PAN)	2	0	0	2
5	Mexico (MEX)	1	3	6	10
6	Guatemala (GUA)	1	0	0	1
7	Puerto Rico (PUR)	0	3	5	8
8	Colombia (COL)*	0	2	5	7
9	Nicaragua (NCA)	0	0	1	1
Totals (9 entries)		18	18	36	72
