= Athletics at the 2018 Summer Youth Olympics – Girls' hammer throw =

Girls' hammer throw at the III Summer Youth Olympic Games
- Venue: Parque Polideportivo Roca
- Date: 12 October and 15 October 2018
- Competitors: 16 from 16 nations

Medalists
1st place, gold medalist(s)		Valeriya Ivanenko; Ukraine
2nd place, silver medalist(s)		Rawan Ayman Ibrahim Barakat; Egypt
3rd place, bronze medalist(s)		Alegna Osorio Mayarí; Cuba

The girls' hammer throw competition at the 2018 Summer Youth Olympics was held on 12 and 15 October, at the Parque Polideportivo Roca.

== Schedule ==
All times are in local time (UTC-3).

Date	Time	Round
12 October 2018	14:40	Stage 1
15 October 2018	14:04	Stage 2

== Results ==
=== Stage 1 ===
Rank	Athlete	Nation	1	2	3	4	Result	Notes
1	Valeriya Ivanenko	Ukraine	71.60	71.24	71.15	74.90	74.90	
2	Rawan Ayman Ibrahim Barakat	Egypt	63.68	65.43	69.67	57.71	69.67	PB
3	Sara Killinen	Finland	64.58	x	60.10	67.63	67.63	
4	Stavroula Kosmidou	Greece	62.99	62.10	63.35	64.65	64.65	
5	Mariola Bukel	Belarus	x	58.05	60.54	64.18	64.18	
6	Carolina Ulloa	Colombia	63.94	59.30	x	63.69	63.94	
7	Rigina Adashbaeva	Uzbekistan	63.72	x	x	62.59	63.72	
8	Alegna Osorio Mayarí	Cuba	58.86	63.69	61.03	x	63.69	
9	Annika Emily Kelly	Estonia	61.73	60.76	63.37	63.41	63.41	PB
10	Aitana Safont	Spain	56.04	x	53.44	61.01	61.01	
11	Rochelle Vidler	Australia	x	x	58.51	60.76	60.76	
12	Karolina Bomba	Poland	57.86	58.34	x	x	58.34	
13	Bianka Rajczi	Hungary	x	x	56.68	58.20	58.20	
14	Silenis Vargas	Venezuela	x	x	54.84	x	54.84	
15	Miranda Tcheutchoua	Ireland	54.65	x	x	x	54.65	
	Elisabet Rut Rúnarsdóttir	Iceland	x	x	x	x	NM	

=== Stage 2 ===
Rank	Athlete	Nation	1	2	3	4	Result	Notes
1	Valeriya Ivanenko	Ukraine	61.95	67.83	72.08	x	72.08	
2	Rawan Ayman Ibrahim Barakat	Egypt	66.19	66.50	65.52	65.04	66.50	
3	Elisabet Rut Rúnarsdóttir	Iceland	56.44	63.52	61.67	x	63.52	
4	Alegna Osorio Mayarí	Cuba	57.35	63.31	58.01	x	63.31	
5	Rigina Adashbaeva	Uzbekistan	x	62.12	60.45	62.12	62.12	
6	Mariola Bukel	Belarus	60.03	x	60.21	59.91	60.21	
7	Annika Emily Kelly	Estonia	60.07	56.72	x	53.96	60.07	
8	Aitana Safont	Spain	57.73	58.11	59.39	58.38	59.39	
9	Stavroula Kosmidou	Greece	56.76	x	54.00	58.68	58.68	
10	Sara Killinen	Finland	x	x	57.96	x	57.96	
11	Silenis Vargas	Venezuela	54.83	56.56	53.82	x	56.56	
12	Rochelle Vidler	Australia	55.31	56.45	x	53.25	56.45	
13	Karolina Bomba	Poland	53.60	x	51.92	55.65	55.65	
14	Bianka Rajczi	Hungary	x	50.24	53.16	x	53.16	
15	Miranda Tcheutchoua	Ireland	x	x	x	51.95	51.95	
	Carolina Ulloa	Colombia	x	x	x	x	NM	

=== Final placing ===
Rank	Athlete	Nation	Stage 1	Stage 2	Total
1st place, gold medalist(s)	Valeriya Ivanenko	Ukraine	74.90	72.08	146.98
2nd place, silver medalist(s)	Rawan Ayman Ibrahim Barakat	Egypt	69.67	66.50	136.17
3rd place, bronze medalist(s)	Alegna Osorio Mayarí	Cuba	63.69	63.31	127.00
4	Rigina Adashbaeva	Uzbekistan	63.72	62.12	125.84
5	Sara Killinen	Finland	67.63	57.96	125.59
6	Mariola Bukel	Belarus	64.18	60.21	124.39
7	Annika Emily Kelly	Estonia	63.41	60.07	123.48
8	Stavroula Kosmidou	Greece	64.65	58.68	123.33
9	Aitana Safont	Spain	61.01	59.39	120.40
10	Rochelle Vidler	Australia	60.76	56.45	117.21
11	Karolina Bomba	Poland	58.34	55.65	113.99
12	Silenis Vargas	Venezuela	54.84	56.56	111.40
13	Bianka Rajczi	Hungary	58.20	53.16	111.36
14	Miranda Tcheutchoua	Ireland	54.65	51.95	106.60
15	Carolina Ulloa	Colombia	63.94	NM	63.94
16	Elisabet Rut Rúnarsdóttir	Iceland	NM	63.52	63.52
