= Judo at the 2019 Pan American Games – Women's 52 kg =

Women's 52 kg at the 2019 Pan American Games
- Venue: Polideportivo 3
- Dates: August 8
- Competitors: 9 from 9 nations

Medalists
Gold medal	Larissa Pimenta	Brazil
Silver medal	Luz Olvera	Mexico
Bronze medal	Kristine Jiménez	Panama
Bronze medal	Nahomys Acosta	Cuba

The women's 52 kg competition of the judo events at the 2019 Pan American Games in Lima, Peru, was held on August 8 at the Polideportivo 3.

== Results ==
All times are local (UTC−5)

=== Bracket ===
Round of 16
Ayelén Elizeche (ARG)	10
Judith González (CHI)	00S3

Quarter Finals
Luz Olvera (MEX)	10
Ayelén Elizeche (ARG)	00S1
Nahomys Acosta (CUB)	10
Kristine Jiménez (PAN)	00S3
Larissa Pimenta (BRA)	10
Diana de Jesús (DOM)	00S1
Brillith Gamarra (PER)	01S1
Marie Besson (CAN)	00

Semi Finals
Luz Olvera (MEX)	10
Nahomys Acosta (CUB)	00S2
Larissa Pimenta (BRA)	10
Brillith Gamarra (PER)	00S3

Final
Luz Olvera (MEX)	00S3
Larissa Pimenta (BRA)	10S1

=== Repechage round ===
Two bronze medals were awarded.

Repechage		Bronze medal
Ayelén Elizeche (ARG)	00
Kristine Jiménez (PAN)	10S2	Kristine Jiménez (PAN)	01S2
		Brillith Gamarra (PER)	00S1

Repechage		Bronze medal
Diana de Jesús (DOM)	01S1
Marie Besson (CAN)	00S1	Diana de Jesús (DOM)	00S2
		Nahomys Acosta (CUB)	01S1
