= Palestine at the 2018 Summer Youth Olympics =

- IOC code: PLE
- NOC: Bahamas Olympic Committee

in Buenos Aires, Argentina 6 – 18 October 2018
- Competitors: 4 in 3 sports
- Medals: Gold 0 Silver 0 Bronze 0 Total 0

Summer Youth Olympics appearances
- 2010; 2014; 2018

Palestine participated at the 2018 Summer Youth Olympics in Buenos Aires, Argentina from 6 October to 18 October 2018.

== Taekwondo ==
Athlete	Event	Round of 16	Quarterfinals	Semifinals	Final	
Athlete	Event	Opposition Result	Opposition Result	Opposition Result	Opposition Result	Rank
Mohammed Yasini	−48 kg	Duurenjargal Purevjal (MGL); L 25–42	did not advance			9
