= Taekwondo at the 2018 Summer Youth Olympics – Boys' 48 kg =

Taekwondo competition

Boys' 48kg at the III Summer Youth Olympic Games
- Venue: Oceania Pavilion
- Date: 7 October
- Competitors: 9 from 9 nations

Medalists
1st place, gold medalist(s)		Dmitrii Shishko	Russia
2nd place, silver medalist(s)		Ulugbek Rashitov	Uzbekistan
3rd place, bronze medalist(s)		Im Seong-bin	South Korea
3rd place, bronze medalist(s)		Mohamed Khalil Jendoubi	Tunisia

The boys' 48 kg competition at the 2018 Summer Youth Olympics was held on 7 October at the Oceania Pavilion.

== Schedule ==
All times are in local time (UTC-3).

Date	Time	Round
Sunday, 7 October 2018	14:15; 15:00; 19:15; 20:15	Round of 16; Quarterfinals; Semifinals; Final

== Bracket ==
Round of 16
9	Mohammed Yasini (PLE)	25
8	Duurenjargal Purevjal (MGL)	42

Quarterfinals
1	Ulugbek Rashitov (UZB)	44
8	Duurenjargal Purevjal (MGL)	3
5	Im Seong-bin (KOR)	30
4	Zurab Kintsurashvili (GEO)	11
3	Mohamed Khalil Jendoubi (TUN)	11
6	Sharif Salim (USA)	8
7	Josip Teskera (CRO)	7
2	Dmitrii Shishko (RUS)	14

Semifinals
1	Ulugbek Rashitov (UZB)	21
5	Im Seong-bin (KOR)	10
3	Mohamed Khalil Jendoubi (TUN)	10
2	Dmitrii Shishko (RUS)	14

Gold medal match
1	Ulugbek Rashitov (UZB)	8
2	Dmitrii Shishko (RUS)	11
