= Canoeing at the 2018 Summer Youth Olympics – Boys' C1 sprint =

Boys' C1 sprint at the III Summer Youth Olympic Games
- Venue: Puerto Madero
- Dates: October 12
- Competitors: 16 from 16 nations

Medalists
1st place, gold medalist(s)		Dias Bakhraddin	Kazakhstan
2nd place, silver medalist(s)		Islomjon Abdusalomov	Uzbekistan
3rd place, bronze medalist(s)		Jiří Minařík	Czech Republic

These are the results for the boys' C1 sprint event at the 2018 Summer Youth Olympics.

== Results ==
=== Qualification ===
Rank	Athlete	Nation	Time	Notes
1	César Soares	Portugal	1:53.98	Q
2	Dias Bakhraddin	Kazakhstan	1:54.08	Q
3	Islomjon Abdusalomov	Uzbekistan	1:54.12	Q
4	Balázs Palla	Hungary	1:54.17	Q
5	Miguel Adrian Figueroa Vargas	Mexico	1:54.98	
6	Diego Araújo do Nascimento	Brazil	1:57.35	
7	Taras Kuzyk	Ukraine	1:57.54	
8	Jiří Minařík	Czech Republic	1:57.71	
9	Yoel Becerra Bernárdez	Spain	1:58.64	
10	Joaquin Ezequiel Lukac	Argentina	1:58.66	
11	Tim Bechtold	Germany	1:59.93	
12	Sobhan Beiranvand	Iran	2:01.21	
13	Alex Antunes	São Tomé and Príncipe	2:09.00	
14	Matias Eduardo Reyes	Chile	2:13.52	
15	Terence Benjamin Saramandif	Mauritius	2:18.14	
16	Finn Anderson	New Zealand	2:34.80	

=== Repechages ===
Rank	Athlete	Nation	Time	Notes
1	Jiří Minařík	Czech Republic	1:53.64	Q
2	Taras Kuzyk	Ukraine	1:54.61	Q
3	Miguel Adrian Figueroa Vargas	Mexico	1:55.00	Q
4	Diego Araújo do Nascimento	Brazil	1:56.15	Q
5	Yoel Becerra Bernárdez	Spain	2:00.10	
6	Sobhan Beiranvand	Iran	2:00.11	
7	Joaquin Ezequiel Lukac	Argentina	2:00.13	
8	Tim Bechtold	Germany	2:02.00	
9	Terence Benjamin Saramandif	Mauritius	2:10.80	
10	Alex Antunes	São Tomé and Príncipe	2:11.16	
11	Matias Eduardo Reyes	Chile	2:13.57	
12	Finn Anderson	New Zealand	2:30.15	

=== Quarterfinals ===
Race	Rank	Athlete	Nation	Time	Notes
1	1	Jiří Minařík	Czech Republic	1:52.69	QFS
1	2	César Soares	Portugal	1:52.91	
2	1	Dias Bakhraddin	Kazakhstan	1:54.64	QFS
2	2	Taras Kuzyk	Ukraine	1:57.48	
3	1	Islomjon Abdusalomov	Uzbekistan	1:54.66	QFS
3	2	Miguel Adrian Figueroa Vargas	Mexico	1:55.20	
4	1	Balázs Palla	Hungary	1:55.48	QFS
4	2	Diego Araújo do Nascimento	Brazil	1:55.92	

=== Semifinals ===
Race	Rank	Athlete	Nation	Time	Notes
1	1	Islomjon Abdusalomov	Uzbekistan	1:53.11	QFG
1	2	Jiří Minařík	Czech Republic	1:55.32	QFB
2	1	Dias Bakhraddin	Kazakhstan	1:54.66	QFG
2	2	Balázs Palla	Hungary	1:57.04	QFB

=== Finals ===
Rank	Athlete	Nation	Time	Notes
Gold Medal Race
1st place, gold medalist(s)	Dias Bakhraddin	Kazakhstan	1:54.66	
2nd place, silver medalist(s)	Islomjon Abdusalomov	Uzbekistan	1:55.17	
Bronze Medal Race
3rd place, bronze medalist(s)	Jiří Minařík	Czech Republic	1:55.45	
4	Balázs Palla	Hungary	1:56.32	
