= Czech Republic at the 2018 Summer Youth Olympics =

- IOC code: CZE
- NOC: Czech Olympic Committee
- Website: https://www.olympic.cz/

in Buenos Aires, Argentina 6 – 18 October 2018
- Competitors: 53 in 19 sports
- Flag bearer: Barbora Malíková
- Medals Ranked 21st: Gold 3 Silver 3 Bronze 5 Total 11

Summer Youth Olympics appearances (overview)
- 2010; 2014; 2018; 2026

The Czech Republic participated at the 2018 Summer Youth Olympics in Buenos Aires, Argentina from 6 October to 18 October 2018.

== Medalists ==
Medal	Name	Sport	Event	Date
Gold	Barbora Seemanová	Swimming	Girls' 100 m freestyle	9 Oct
Gold	Barbora Seemanová	Swimming	Girls' 50 m freestyle	12 Oct
Gold	Barbora Malíková	Athletics	Girls' 400 m	14 Oct
Silver	Martin Bezděk	Judo	Boys' 81 kg	8 Oct
Silver	Anna Šantrůčková; Eliška Podrazilová	Rowing	Girls' Pairs	9 Oct
Silver	Martin Bezděk	Judo	Mixed Team	10 Aug
Silver	Kateřina Galíčková	Basketball	Girls' shoot-out contest	15 Oct
Bronze	František Polák	Weightlifting	Boys' 56 kg	7 Oct
Bronze	Veronika Bieleszova	Fencing	Girls' Épée	8 Oct
Bronze	Barbora Seemanová	Swimming	Girls' 200 m freestyle	10 Oct
Bronze	Jiří Minařík	Canoeing	Boys' C1 sprint	12 Oct
Bronze	Tereza Švábíková	Badminton	Mixed Team	12 Aug
Bronze	Martin Florian	Athletics	Boys' javelin throw	16 Oct

== Athletics ==
Boys
Track and road events

Athlete	Event	Stage 1		Stage 2		Total	
Athlete	Event	Result	Rank	Result	Rank	Total	Rank
Tadeáš Formánek	100 m	11.28	21	10.59	8	21.68	17
Jakub Davidík	800 m	1:53.75	15	1:54.75	16	3:48.76	14
Jiří Pechar	110 m hurdles	14.16	12	13.95	10	28.11	11
Ondřej Hodboď	2000 m steeplechase	—N/a				5:51.78	9
Ondřej Hodboď	cross country	—N/a				12:29	43

Field events

Athlete	Event	Stage 1		Stage 2		Total	
Athlete	Event	Result	Rank	Result	Rank	Total	Rank
Tomáš Kratochvíl	Long jump	7.02	11	6.97	10	13.99	10
Martin Florian	Javelin throw	74.00	5	76.24	2	150.24	3rd place, bronze medalist(s)

Girls
Track and road events

Athlete	Event	Stage 1		Stage 2		Total	
Athlete	Event	Result	Rank	Result	Rank	Total	Rank
Tereza Marková	100 m	12.44	14	12.13	20	24.57	17
Barbora Šplechtnová	200 m	24.30	4	23.82	5	48.12	4
Barbora Malíková	400 m	54.18	1	54.68	1	1:48.86	1st place, gold medalist(s)
Denisa Folková	800 m	2:11.97	11	2:10.88	8	4:22.85	9
Kristýna Korelová	400 m hurdles	1:01.84	9	1:01.13	10	2:02.97	8

Field events

Athlete	Event	Stage 1		Stage 2		Total	
Athlete	Event	Result	Rank	Result	Rank	Total	Rank
Barbora Sajdoková	High jump	1.78	6	1.79	5	3.57	5
Veronika Šebáková	Pole vault	3.65	5	3.72	7	7.37	6
Linda Suchá	Long jump	5.96	5	6.01	7	11.97	6
Ivana Koktavá	Javelin throw	46.80	12	42.76	13	89.56	13

== Badminton ==
The Czech Republic qualified one player based on the Badminton Junior World Rankings.

Singles

Athlete	Event	Group stage				Quarterfinal	Semifinal	Final / BM	Rank
Athlete	Event	Opposition Score	Opposition Score	Opposition Score	Rank	Opposition Score	Opposition Score	Opposition Score	Rank
Tereza Švábíková	Girls' Singles	Hooi (SGP); L 0–2	İnci (TUR); W 2–1	King (GBR); W 2–0	2	did not advance			9

Team

Athlete	Event	Group stage				Quarterfinal	Semifinal	Final / BM	Rank
Athlete	Event	Opposition Score	Opposition Score	Opposition Score	Rank	Opposition Score	Opposition Score	Opposition Score	Rank
Team Theta; Tereza Švábíková (CZE); Julien Carraggi (BEL); Mohamed Mostafa Kamel (EGY); Kodai Naraoka (JPN); Lukas Resch (GER); Zecily Fung (AUS); Jaqueline Lima (BRA); Hirari Mizui (JPN)	Mixed Teams	Sigma (MIX); L (100–110)	Omega (MIX); L (100–110)	Gamma (MIX); L (107–110)	4Q	Delta (MIX); W (110–93)	Alpha (MIX); L (90–110)	Zeta (MIX); W (110–107)	3rd place, bronze medalist(s)

== Basketball ==
3x3 tournament

The Czech Republic qualified a girls' team based on the U18 3x3 national federation ranking.

- Girls' tournament – 1 team of 4 athletes: Kateřina Galíčková, Alžběta Levínská, Anežka Kopecká, Anna Rosecká

Group stage

Pos	Team	Pld	W	L	PF	PA	PD	Pts
1	Australia	4	3	1	52	45	+7	7
2	Netherlands	4	3	1	59	45	+14	7
3	Spain	4	2	2	58	48	+10	6
4	Estonia	4	1	3	55	77	−22	5
5	Czech Republic	4	1	3	52	61	−9	5

10 October 2018
10:30

Czech Republic	16–13	Spain

PlayGround, Buenos Aires

10 October 2018
12:30

Australia	15–11	Czech Republic

PlayGround, Buenos Aires

14 October 2018
10:00

Czech Republic	15–17	Estonia

PlayGround, Buenos Aires

14 October 2018
11:40

Netherlands	16–10	Czech Republic

PlayGround, Buenos Aires

Shoot-out contest

Athlete	Event	Qualification		Final					
Athlete	Event	Points	Rank	Round 1	Round 2	Round 3	Round 4	Total	Rank
Kateřina Galíčková	Shoot-out contest	5	4	2	3	3	0	8	2nd place, silver medalist(s)
Anna Rosecká	Shoot-out contest	2	27	Did not advance					

== Beach volleyball ==
The Czech Republic qualified a boys' team based on their performance at 2017-18 European Youth Continental Cup Final.

- Boys' tournament - 1 team of 2 athletes

Athletes	Event	Group stage				Round of 24	Round of 16	Quarterfinals	Semifinals	Final / BM	Rank
Athletes	Event	Opposition Score	Opposition Score	Opposition Score	Rank	Opposition Score	Opposition Score	Opposition Score	Opposition Score	Opposition Score	Rank
Maňas; Sedlák	Boys' tournament	N Phichakon–T Phanupong (THA); L 1-2	Amieva–Zelayeta (ARG); L 0-2	Gysin–Broch (SUI); L 0-2	4	did not advance					

== Boxing ==
Athlete	Event	Preliminary R1	Preliminary R2	Semifinals	Final / RM	Rank
Athlete	Event	Opposition Result	Opposition Result	Opposition Result	Opposition Result	Rank
Daniel Mikušťák	-91 kg	Matthes (SAM); W 5–0	—N/a	Hacid (ALG); L 2–3	Canales (PUR); L 0-5	4

== Canoeing ==
The Czech Republic qualified three boats based on its performance at the 2018 World Qualification Event.

- Boys' C1 - 1 boat
- Boys' K1 - 1 boat
- Girls' K1 - 1 boat

Athlete	Event	Qualification		Repechage		Last 16	Quarterfinals	Semifinals	Final / BM	Rank
Athlete	Event	Time	Rank	Time	Rank	Opposition Result	Opposition Result	Opposition Result	Opposition Result	Rank
Tomáš Hradil	Boys' K1 sprint	1:40.11	1	Bye		—N/a	Kiss (HUN); L DNF	did not advance		8
Tomáš Hradil	Boys' K1 slalom	1:29.70	13	1:24.50	8	—N/a	did not advance			12
Jiří Minařík	Boys' C1 sprint	1:57.71	8	1:53.64	1	—N/a	Soares (POR); W 1:52.69	Abdusalomov (UZB); L 1:55.32	Palla (HUN); W 1:55.45	3rd place, bronze medalist(s)
Jiří Minařík	Boys' C1 slalom	1:37.12	10	1:43.78	8	—N/a	did not advance			12
Adela Házová	Girls' C1 sprint	1:55.91	5	Bye		Conradie (RSA); W 1:59.56	Zint (GER); L 1:56.07	did not advance		7
Adela Házová	Girls' C1 slalom	1:28.81	15	1:34.52	9	did not advance				17

== Cycling ==
The Czech Republic qualified a boys' combined team based on its ranking in the Youth Olympic Games Junior Nation Rankings. They also qualified a mixed BMX racing team based on its ranking in the Youth Olympic Games BMX Junior Nation Rankings and two athletes in BMX freestyle based on its performance at the 2018 Urban Cycling World Championship.

- Boys' combined team - 1 team of 2 athletes
- Mixed BMX racing team - 1 team of 2 athletes
- Mixed BMX freestyle - 1 boy and 1 girl

Boys' combined team

Athlete	Event	Team time trial			Road race			XC eliminator		XC short circuit			Criterium				Total	
Athlete	Event	Time	Rank	Points	Time	Rank	Points	Rank	Points	Time	Rank	Points	Laps	Sprint pts	Rank	Points	Points	Rank
Samuel Jirouš	Boys' combined team	8:42.21	4	50	1:31:03	15	2	18	0	DNF QH1	—N/a	0	15	0	—N/a	0	137	7
Petr Kelemen	Boys' combined team	8:42.21	4	50	1:31:08	18	0	7	25	19:36	5	40	16	2	6	20	137	7

Mixed BMX racing

Athlete	Event	Semifinal		Final		Total points	Rank
Athlete	Event	Points	Rank	Result	Rank	Total points	Rank
Lukáš Mentlík	Mixed BMX racing	13	5	Did not advance		40	10
Eliška Bartuňková	Mixed BMX racing	7	3	40.591	7	40	10

Mixed BMX freestyle park

Athlete	Event	Seeding				Qualification				Final / Small final				Total points	Rank
Athlete	Event	Run 1	Run 2	Score	Seed	Run 1	Run 2	Score	Rank	Run 1	Run 2	Score	Rank	Total points	Rank
Martin Habada	Mixed BMX freestyle park	52.66	57.50	55.08	6	43.00	28.33	35.66	8 q	67.66	43.66	67.66	6	7	6
Nikol Přikrylová	Mixed BMX freestyle park	55.66	48.33	51.99	5	53.00	54.00	53.50	5 q	59.33	59.50	59.50	5	7	6

== Fencing ==
Czech Republic qualified one athlete based on its performance at the 2018 Cadet World Championship.

- Girls' Épée – Veronika Bieleszová

Athlete	Event	Pool Round	Seed	Round of 16	Quarterfinals	Semifinals	Final / BM	Rank
Athlete	Event	Opposition Score	Seed	Opposition Score	Opposition Score	Opposition Score	Opposition Score	Rank
Veronika Bieleszová	Épée	Amer (EGY) W 5–1; Wasiak (BEL) W 5–4; Chorniy (UKR) W 5–4; Lim (KOR) L 2–5; Hsieh (HKG) W 5–4; Dyner Villa (CRC) W 5–4	2	—N/a	Lim (KOR); W 15–6	Chorniy (UKR); L 11–15	Wasiak (BEL); W 9–8	3rd place, bronze medalist(s)

Team

Athletes	Event	Quarterfinals	Classification place 5–8	Classification place 5	Semifinals	Final / BM	Rank
Athletes	Event	Opposition Result	Opposition Result	Opposition Result	Opposition Result	Opposition Result	Rank
Team Europe 2 Veronika Bieleszová (CZE); Rebeca Candescu (ROU); Jolien Corteyn (BEL); Paul Veltrup (GER); Jonas Winterberg-Poulsen (DEN); Samuel Jarry (FRA)	Mixed team	Team Europe 3 (MIX); L 24–30	Team Africa (MIX); W 43–13	Team Asia-Oceania 2 (MIX); L 22–30	Did not advance		6

== Golf ==
Individual

Athlete	Event	Round 1		Round 2			Round 3			Total		
Athlete	Event	Score	Rank	Score	Total	Rank	Score	Total	Rank	Score	Par	Rank
Sarah Hricíková	Girls' Individual	79 (+9)	22	72 (+2)	151	5	73 (+3)	224	7	224	+14	15
Václav Tichý	Boys' Individual	71 (+1)	5	74 (+4)	145	14	68 (-2)	213	1	213	+3	5

Team

Athletes	Event	Round 1 (Fourball)		Round 2 (Foursome)		Round 3 (Individual Stroke)				Total		
Athletes	Event	Score	Rank	Score	Rank	Girl	Boy	Total	Rank	Score	Par	Rank
Sarah Hricíková; Václav Tichý	Mixed team	67 (-3)	22	78 (+8)	24	72	72	144 (+4)	7	289	+9	20

== Gymnastics ==
=== Artistic ===
The Czech Republic qualified one gymnast based on its performance at the 2018 European Junior Championship.

- Boys' artistic individual all-around - 1 quota

Athlete	Event	Apparatus						Total	Rank
Athlete	Event	F	PH	R	V	PB	HB	Total	Rank
Ondřej Kalný	Qualification	DNS							

=== Multidiscipline ===
Team	Athlete	Acrobatic	Artistic	Rhythmic	Trampoline	Total points	Rank
Team Kohei Uchimura (Blue)	Daryna Plokhotniuk (UKR); Oleksandr Madei (UKR)	10	—N/a			407	8
Team Kohei Uchimura (Blue)	Abdulaziz Mirvaliev (UZB)	—N/a	115	—N/a		407	8
Team Kohei Uchimura (Blue)	Michael Torres (PUR)	—N/a	117	—N/a		407	8
Team Kohei Uchimura (Blue)	Ondřej Kalný (CZE)	—N/a	–	—N/a		407	8
Team Kohei Uchimura (Blue)	Amelie Morgan (GBR)	—N/a	20	—N/a		407	8
Team Kohei Uchimura (Blue)	Tang Xijing (CHN)	—N/a	9	—N/a		407	8
Team Kohei Uchimura (Blue)	Csenge Bácskay (HUN)	—N/a	5	—N/a		407	8
Team Kohei Uchimura (Blue)	Josephine Juul Møller (NOR)	—N/a		34	—N/a	407	8
Team Kohei Uchimura (Blue)	Denisa Stoian (ROU)	—N/a		47	—N/a	407	8
Team Kohei Uchimura (Blue)	Anna Kamenshchikova (BLR)	—N/a		22	—N/a	407	8
Team Kohei Uchimura (Blue)	Noureddine-Younes Belkhir (ALG)	—N/a			21	407	8
Team Kohei Uchimura (Blue)	Emily Mussmann (SUI)	—N/a			7	407	8

== Judo ==
Individual

Athlete	Event	Round of 16	Quarterfinals	Semifinals	Rep 1	Rep 2	Rep 3	Final / BM	
Athlete	Event	Opposition Result	Opposition Result	Opposition Result	Opposition Result	Opposition Result	Opposition Result	Opposition Result	Rank
Martin Bezděk	Boys' 81 kg	Anwar Zrhari (MAR); W 10-01	Carlos Páez (VEN); W 10-00	Ahmed Rebahi (ALG); W 01-00s1	Bye		—N/a	Adrian Şulcă (ROU); L 00-10	2nd place, silver medalist(s)
Ester Svobodová	Girls' 78 kg	Christi-Rose Pretorius (ZIM); W 10-00s1	Liu Li-ling (TPE); W 10-00	Margarita Gritsenko (KAZ); L 00-11s1	Bye			Metka Lobnik (SLO); L 00s1-10	5

Team

Athletes	Event	Round of 16	Quarterfinals	Semifinals	Final	
Athletes	Event	Opposition Result	Opposition Result	Opposition Result	Opposition Result	Rank
Team Athens; Mireille Andriamifehy (MAD); Martin Bezděk (CZE); Juan Montealegre (COL); Javier Peña Insausti (ESP); Christi Rose Pretorius (ZIM); Tababi Devi Thangjam (IND); Marin Visser (NED); Anwar Zrhari (MAR)	Mixed team	Bye	Team Los Angeles (MIX); W 5–3	Team Rio de Janeiro (MIX); W 5–3	Team Beijing (MIX); L 3–4	2nd place, silver medalist(s)
Team Montreal; Houda Faissal Abdourahman (DJI); Nemesis Candelo (PAN); Szofi Ozbas (HUN); Ester Svobodová (CZE); Oleh Veredyba (UKR); Kimy Bravo Blanco (CUB); Rhys Allan (AUS); Julian Gutierrez (MEX)	Mixed team	Team Beijing (MIX); L 2–5	did not advance			

== Roller speed skating ==
Athlete	Event	5000m elimination		1000m sprint						500m sprint								Total	
Athlete	Event	Rank	Points	Semifinals		Final		Total		Quarterfinals		Semifinals		Final		Total		Points	Rank
Athlete	Event	Rank	Points	Time	Rank	Time	Rank	Rank	Points	Time	Rank	Time	Rank	Time	Rank	Rank	Points	Points	Rank
Andrea Lokvencová	Girls' combined	12	3	1:40.756	6	—N/a		12	3	53.696	3	—N/a				12	3	9	13

== Rowing ==
The Czech Republic qualified one boat based on its performance at the 2017 World Junior Rowing Championships. The Czech Republic later qualified a single sculls boat based on its performance at the 2018 European Rowing Junior Championships.

- Boys' single sculls - 1 boat
- Girls' pair - 1 boat

Athlete	Event	Time trial		Heats						Quarterfinals		Semifinals		Final	
Athlete	Event	Time trial		Round 2		Round 3		Points	Rank	Quarterfinals		Semifinals		Final	
Athlete	Event	Time	Rank	Time	Rank	Time	Rank	Points	Rank	Time	Rank	Time	Rank	Time	Rank
Gabriel Mahler	Boys' single sculls	3:38.87	8	1:48.20	2	1:41.25	1	10	7 Q	1:36.10	2 FB	—N/a		1:43.16	8
Anna Šantrůčková; Eliška Podrazilová	Girls' single sculls	3:47.56	7	1:45.56	1	1:47.62	1	14	1 Q	—N/a		1:40.62	1 FA	1:40.09	2nd place, silver medalist(s)

== Shooting ==
The Czech Republic qualified one sport shooter based on its performance at the 2018 European Championships.

- Boys' 10m Air Pistol - 1 quota

Individual

Athlete	Event	Qualification		Final	
Athlete	Event	Points	Rank	Points	Rank
Pavel Schejbal	Boys' 10 m air pistol	572-11	3	134.4	7

Mixed

Athlete	Event	Qualification		Round of 16	Quarterfinal	Semifinal	Final	
Athlete	Event	Points	Rank	Opposition Score	Opposition Score	Opposition Score	Opposition Score	Rank
Olivia Kate Erickson (AUS); Pavel Schejbal (CZE)	Mixed 10 metre air pistol	749-12	7	al-Kaabi (IRQ); Son (BEL); L 9-10	did not advance			10

== Swimming ==
Boys

Athlete	Event	Heats		Semifinals		Final	
Athlete	Event	Time	Rank	Time	Rank	Time	Rank
Adam Hlobeň	200 m freestyle	1:51.92	18	did not advance			
Adam Hlobeň	400 m freestyle	3:59.11	25	did not advance			
Adam Hlobeň	200 m butterfly	2:02.48	12	did not advance			
Jakub Lahoda	200 m backstroke	2:07.36	19	did not advance			
Jakub Lahoda	200 m individual medley	2:05.49	11	did not advance			

Girls

Athlete	Event	Heats		Semifinals		Final	
Athlete	Event	Time	Rank	Time	Rank	Time	Rank
Barbora Seemanová	50 m freestyle	25.44	1	25.33	1	25.14	1st place, gold medalist(s)
Barbora Seemanová	100 m freestyle	55.15	1	54.61	1	54.19	1st place, gold medalist(s)
Barbora Seemanová	200 m freestyle	2:00.44	4	—N/a		1:58.25	3rd place, bronze medalist(s)
Kristýna Štemberová	50 m backstroke	30.04	21	did not advance			
Kristýna Štemberová	50 m butterfly	28.33	26	did not advance			
Kristýna Štemberová	100 m butterfly	1:02.20	16	1:02.27	16	did not advance	

== Table tennis ==
Athlete	Event	Group stage	Rank	Round of 16	Quarterfinals	Semifinals	Final / BM	Rank
Athlete	Event	Opposition Score	Rank	Opposition Score	Opposition Score	Opposition Score	Opposition Score	Rank
Zdena Blašková	Girls	Group B Sun (CHN); L 1–11, 2–11, 4–11, 6–11	2	Tailakova (RUS); L 9–11, 11–2, 8–11, 4–11, 11–9, 11–5, 2–11	did not advance			9
Zdena Blašková	Girls	Morri (SMR); W 11–6, 11–2, 11–5, 12–10	2	Tailakova (RUS); L 9–11, 11–2, 8–11, 4–11, 11–9, 11–5, 2–11	did not advance			9
Zdena Blašková	Girls	Gauthier (FRA); W 11–6, 11–9, 4–11, 7–11, 11–9, 8–11, 11–8	2	Tailakova (RUS); L 9–11, 11–2, 8–11, 4–11, 11–9, 11–5, 2–11	did not advance			9

Team

Athletes	Event	Group stage	Rank	Round of 16	Quarterfinals	Semifinals	Final / BM	Rank
Athletes	Event	Opposition Score	Rank	Opposition Score	Opposition Score	Opposition Score	Opposition Score	Rank
Europe 4 Zdena Blašková (CZE); Medardas Stankevičius (LTU)	Mixed	Group A Šurjan (SRB); Möregårdh (SWE); L 0–3	4	Did not advance				
Europe 4 Zdena Blašková (CZE); Medardas Stankevičius (LTU)	Mixed	Pyon (PRK); Kim (PRK); L 1–2	4	Did not advance				
Europe 4 Zdena Blašková (CZE); Medardas Stankevičius (LTU)	Mixed	Węgrzyn (POL); Kolodziejczyk (AUT); L 0–3	4	Did not advance				

== Taekwondo ==
Athlete	Event	Round of 16	Quarterfinals	Semifinals	Final / BM	
Athlete	Event	Opposition Result	Opposition Result	Opposition Result	Opposition Result	Rank
Petra Štolbová	Girls' 63 kg	Koumba Ibo (CIV); W 27-16	Leslie Soltero (MEX); L 8-18	did not advance		5

== Tennis ==
Singles

Athlete	Event	Round of 32	Round of 16	Quarterfinals	Semifinals	Final / BM	
Athlete	Event	Opposition Score	Opposition Score	Opposition Score	Opposition Score	Opposition Score	Rank
Ondřej Štyler	Boys' singles	Mejía (COL); W (6-4, 6-2)	Michalski (POL); L (2-6, 0-6)	did not advance			9
Dalibor Svrčina	Boys' singles	Tabur (FRA); L (5-7, 6-3, 2-6)	did not advance				17

Doubles

Athletes	Event	Round of 32	Round of 16	Quarterfinals	Semifinals	Final / BM	
Athletes	Event	Opposition Score	Opposition Score	Opposition Score	Opposition Score	Opposition Score	Rank
Ondřej Štyler; Dalibor Svrčina	Boys' doubles	—N/a	Erel (TUR) / Musetti (ITA); W (6-4, 6-2)	de Jong (NED) / Wenger (SUI); W (2-6, 6-4, [10-5])	Báez (ARG) / Díaz Acosta (ARG); L (5-7, 6-1, [6-10])	Gaston (FRA) / Tabur (FRA); L (7-6^{4}, 5-7, [8-10])	4
Kamilla Rakhimova (RUS); Ondřej Štyler	Mixed doubles	Burel (FRA) / Gaston (FRA); L (6-4, 4-6, [8-10])	did not advance				17
Vismane (LAT); Dalibor Svrčina	Mixed doubles	Selekhmeteva (RUS) / López Montagud (ESP); L (5-7, 6-4, [9-11])	did not advance				17

== Weightlifting ==
Athlete	Event	Snatch		Clean & jerk		Total	Rank
Athlete	Event	Result	Rank	Result	Rank	Total	Rank
František Polák	Boys' 56 kg	104	3rd	129	3rd	233	3rd place, bronze medalist(s)
