= Judo at the 2018 Summer Youth Olympics – Boys' 81 kg =

Judo competition

Boys' 81 kg at the III Summer Youth Olympic Games
- Venue: Parque Polideportivo Roca
- Date: 8 October
- Competitors: 12 from 12 nations

Medalists
1st place, gold medalist(s)		Adrian Şulcă	Romania
2nd place, silver medalist(s)		Martin Bezděk	Czech Republic
3rd place, bronze medalist(s)		Keagan Young	Canada
3rd place, bronze medalist(s)		Mark van Dijk	Netherlands

The Boys' 81 kg competition at the 2018 Summer Youth Olympics was held on 8 October at the Asia Pavilion.

== Schedule ==
All times are in local time (UTC-3).

Date	Time	Round
Sunday, 8 October 2018	10:00; 11:00; 11:00; 12:00; 15:00	Round of 16; Quarterfinals; Repechage Rounds; Semifinals; Finals

== Results ==
Legend

- 1st number — Ippon
- 2nd number — Waza-ari
- s — Shido

=== Main Bracket ===
Round of 16
Ahmed Rebahi (ALG)	11s1
Ahmed Mohamed Fahmy (EGY)	00s3
Martin Bezděk (CZE)	10
Anwar Zrhari (MAR)	01
Adrian Şulcă (ROU)	10
Rihari Iki (NZL)	00
Mark van Dijk (NED)	000
Alex Barto (SVK)	01s1

Quarterfinals
Keagan Young (CAN)	000
Ahmed Rebahi (ALG)	10s1
Carlos Páez (VEN)	00
Martin Bezděk (CZE)	10
Rhys Allan (AUS)	00
Adrian Şulcă (ROU)	01
Alexis Harrison (PAN)	00
Alex Barto (SVK)	01s2

Semifinals
Ahmed Rebahi (ALG)	00s1
Martin Bezděk (CZE)	01
Adrian Şulcă (ROU)	10
Alex Barto (SVK)	00

Finals
Martin Bezděk (CZE)	00
Adrian Şulcă (ROU)	10

=== Repechage ===
Repechage 1
Ahmed Mohamed Fahmy (EGY)	00s1
Carlos Páez (VEN)	10s1
Anwar Zrhari (MAR)	00
Keagan Young (CAN)	10
Rihari Iki (NZL)	10
Alexis Harrison (PAN)	00
Mark van Dijk (NED)	01
Rhys Allan (AUS)	00s2

Repechage 2
Carlos Páez (VEN)	00s1
Keagan Young (CAN)	01s2
Rihari Iki (NZL)	00
Mark van Dijk (NED)	10

Bronze Medal Finals
Keagan Young (CAN)	01s1
Alex Barto (SVK)	00s1
Mark van Dijk (NED)	10
Ahmed Rebahi (ALG)	01s2
