= Uzbekistan at the 2018 Summer Youth Olympics =

- IOC code: UZB
- NOC: National Olympic Committee of the Republic of Uzbekistan
- Website: https://www.olympic.uz/

in Buenos Aires, Argentina 6 – 18 October 2018
- Competitors: 37 in 13 sports
- Medals Ranked 12th: Gold 4 Silver 5 Bronze 5 Total 14

Summer Youth Olympics appearances (overview)
- 2010; 2014; 2018

Uzbekistan participated at the 2018 Summer Youth Olympics in Buenos Aires, Argentina, from 6 October to 18 October 2018.

== Competitors ==
Sport	Boys	Girls	Total
Athletics	0	0	0
Boxing	3	1	4
Canoeing	2	1	3
Equestrian	1	0	1
Gymnastics	3	3	6
Karate	1	0	1
Rowing	2	1	3
Weightlifting	1	2	3
Wrestling	2	2	4
Total	15	10	25

== Boxing ==
Boys

Athlete	Event	Preliminary R1	Preliminary R2	Semifinals	Final / RM	Rank
Athlete	Event	Opposition Result	Opposition Result	Opposition Result	Opposition Result	Rank
Abdumalik Khalokov	-56 kg	Bye	Qamili (ALB); W 5–0	Cuello (ARG); W 5–0	Halinichev (UKR); W 5-0	1st place, gold medalist(s)
Jakhongir Rakhmonov	-69 kg	Arregui (ARG); L 2–3	Belini (BRA); W 4–1	Arregui (ARG); L 2-3	Hasanov (AZE); W 5-0	3rd place, bronze medalist(s)
Timur Merjanov	-81 kg	Mousavipaeindezaei (IRI); W 4–1	—N/a	Kolesnikov (RUS); L 0–5	Ali Karar (EGY); W 5–0	3rd place, bronze medalist(s)

Girls

Athlete	Event	Preliminaries	Semifinals	Final / RM	Rank
Athlete	Event	Opposition Result	Opposition Result	Opposition Result	Rank
Khursandoy Kholmatova	-51 kg	Stoeva (BUL); L 0–5	did not advance		5

== Canoeing ==
Uzbekistan qualified three boats based on its performance at the 2018 World Qualification Event.

- Boys' C1 - 1 boat
- Boys' K1 - 1 boat
- Girls' C1 - 1 boat

Athlete	Event	Qualification		Repechage		Last 16	Quarterfinals	Semifinals	Final / BM	Rank
Athlete	Event	Time	Rank	Time	Rank	Opposition Result	Opposition Result	Opposition Result	Opposition Result	Rank
Islomjon Abdusalomov	Boys' C1 sprint	1:54.12	3	Bye		—N/a	Vargas (MEX); W 1:54.66	Minařík (CZE); W 1:53.11	Bakhraddin (KAZ); L 1:55.17	2nd place, silver medalist(s)
Islomjon Abdusalomov	Boys' C1 slalom	DSQ		did not advance						
Sherzod Khakimjonov	Boys' K1 sprint	1:44.91	7	1:43.50	2	Vangeel (BEL); L 1:42.76	did not advance			
Sherzod Khakimjonov	Boys' K1 slalom	1:33.09	14	1:30.81	10	did not advance				
Gulbakhor Fayzieva	Girls' C1 sprint	2:14.22	1	Bye		Bello (NGR); W 2:10.38	Marusava (BLR); W 2:13.08	Nurlanova (KAZ); W 2:10.62	Gonczol (HUN); W 2:06.28	1st place, gold medalist(s)
Gulbakhor Fayzieva	Girls' C1 slalom	1:40.86	10	1:34.72	1	Luknárová (SVK); L 1:32.68	did not advance			

== Equestrian ==
Uzbekistan qualified a rider based on its ranking in the FEI World Jumping Challenge Rankings.

- Individual Jumping - 1 athlete

Summary

Athlete	Horse	Event	Qualification					Final					Total	
Athlete	Horse	Event	Round 1		Round 2			Round A		Round B			Total	
Athlete	Horse	Event	Penalties	Rank	Penalties	Total	Rank	Penalties	Rank	Penalties	Total	Rank	Penalties	Rank
Abdushukur Sobirjonov	Quby Z	Individual	—N/a					8	23 Q	0	8	17	8	17
Asia; Sara Hussein Saleh Al Armouti (JOR); Edgar Fung (HKG); Momen Zindaki (SYR); In Shaallah Hameed (IRQ); Abdushukur Sobirjonov (UZB)	Passe One Z The Winner Z Cooper Larquino; Kings Charade; Quby Z	Team	13 # 0; 0; 4; 8 #	4	1; 4; 0; 4 # 4 #	5	9	—N/a					38	6

== Gymnastics ==
=== Acrobatic ===
Uzbekistan qualified a mixed pair based on its performance at the 2018 Acrobatic Gymnastics World Championship.

- Mixed pair - 1 team of 2 athletes

=== Artistic ===
Uzbekistan qualified two gymnasts based on its performance at the 2018 Asian Junior Championship.

- Boys' artistic individual all-around - 1 quota
- Girls' artistic individual all-around - 1 quota

=== Rhythmic ===
Uzbekistan qualified one gymnast based on its performance at the 2018 Asian Junior Championship.

- Girls' rhythmic individual all-around - 1 quota

=== Trampoline ===
Uzbekistan qualified one gymnast based on its performance at the 2018 Asian Junior Championship.

- Boys' trampoline - 1 quota

== Judo ==
Individual

Athlete	Event	Round of 16	Quarterfinals	Semifinals	Rep 1	Rep 2	Rep 3	Final / BM	Rank
Athlete	Event	Opposition Result	Opposition Result	Opposition Result	Opposition Result	Opposition Result	Opposition Result	Opposition Result	Rank
Jaykhunbek Nazarov	Boys' 66 kg	Georgios Balarjishvili (CYP); W 10-00s1	Javier Peña (ESP); L 00s2-10	did not advance	Bye	Simon Zulu (ZAM); W 10s2-00s3	Turpal Djoukaev (FIN); W 10s1-00s3	Antonio Tornal (DOM); L 00s1-10s3	5
Nilufar Ermaganbetova	Girls' 52 kg	Bye	Nemesis Candelo (PAN); W 10s1-00s2	Sosorbaram Lkhagvasüren (MGL); L 00s1-10	Bye			Sairy Colón (PUR); W 10-00	3rd place, bronze medalist(s)

Team

Athletes	Event	Round of 16	Quarterfinals	Semifinals	Final	
Athletes	Event	Opposition Result	Opposition Result	Opposition Result	Opposition Result	Rank
Team Beijing; Artsiom Kolasau (BLR); Liu Li-ling (TPE); Jaykhunbek Nazarov (UZB); Carlos Páez (VEN); Itzel Pecha (MEX); Ana Viktorija Puljiz (CRO); Veronica Toniolo (ITA)	Mixed team	Team Montreal (MIX); W 5–2	Team Nanjing (MIX); W 4–3	Team London (MIX); W 7–0	Team Athens (MIX); W 4–3	1st place, gold medalist(s)
Team Nanjing; Hasret Bozkurt (TUR); Joaquín Burgos (ARG); Nilufar Ermaganbetova (UZB); Rihari Iki (NZL); Alaa Mousaad Mohamed (EGY); Eva Pérez Soler (ESP); Vugar Talibov (AZE); Romain Valadier-Picard (FRA)	Mixed team	—N/a	Team Beijing (MIX); L 3–4	did not advance		

== Karate ==
Uzbekistan qualified one athlete based on its performance at one of the Karate Qualification Tournaments.

- Girls' -53kg - Dildora Alikulova

Athlete	Event	Group phase				Semifinal	Final / BM	
Athlete	Event	Opposition Score	Opposition Score	Opposition Score	Rank	Opposition Score	Opposition Score	Rank
Dildora Alikulova	Girls' 53 kg	Yasmin Nasr Elgewily (EGY); D 0-0	Catalina Valdés (CHI); D 0-0	Damla Ocak (TUR); W 1-0	2 Q	Rinka Tahata (JPN); L 0-2	did not advance	3rd place, bronze medalist(s)

== Rowing ==
Uzbekistan qualified one boys' boat based on its performance at the 2017 World Junior Rowing Championships. They also qualified one girls' boat based on its performance at the 2018 Asian Youth Olympic Games Qualification Regatta.

- Boys' pair – 2 athletes
- Girls' single sculls - 1 athlete

== Shooting ==
Athlete	Event	Qualification		Final	
Athlete	Event	Points	Rank	Points	Rank
Zaynab Pardabaeva	Girls' 10m air rifle	605.2	20	did not advance	

Team

Athletes	Event	Qualification		Round of 16	Quarterfinals	Semifinals	Final / BM	
Athletes	Event	Points	Rank	Opposition Result	Opposition Result	Opposition Result	Opposition Result	Rank
Zaynab Pardabaeva (UZB); Grigorii Shamakov (RUS)	Mixed 10m air rifle	827.0	2 Q	Chen (TPE); Sharar (BAN); L 7–10	did not advance			

== Taekwondo ==
Athlete	Event	Round of 16	Quarterfinals	Semifinals	Final	
Athlete	Event	Opposition Result	Opposition Result	Opposition Result	Opposition Result	Rank
Ulugbek Rashitov	Boys' −48 kg	Bye	Duurenjargal Purevjal (MGL); W 44-3	Im Seong-bin (KOR); W 21-10	Dmitrii Shishko (RUS); L 8-11	2nd place, silver medalist(s)

== Weightlifting ==
Uzbekistan qualified three athletes based on its performance at the 2017 World Youth Championships.

Boys

Athlete	Event	Snatch		Clean & Jerk		Total	Rank
Athlete	Event	Result	Rank	Result	Rank	Total	Rank
Mukhammadkodir Toshtemirov	−77 kg	140	2	168	2	308	2nd place, silver medalist(s)

Girls

Athlete	Event	Snatch		Clean & jerk		Total	Rank
Athlete	Event	Result	Rank	Result	Rank	Total	Rank
Kumushkhon Fayzullaeva	−63 kg	94	1	124	1	218	1st place, gold medalist(s)
Dolera Davronova	+63 kg	92	3	125	3	217	2nd place, silver medalist(s)

- Supatchanin Khamhaeng from Thailand was disqualified after testing positive for a banned substance. She was stripped of her gold medal and Dolera Davronova got the silver medal instead of the bronze medal.

== Wrestling ==
Key:
- VFA – Victory by Fall
- VSU – Without any points scored by the opponent
- VSU1 – With point(s) scored by the opponent
- VPO – Without any points scored by the opponent
- VPO1 – With point(s) scored by the opponent

Boys

Athlete	Event	Group stage			Final / RM	Rank
Athlete	Event	Opposition Score	Opposition Score	Rank	Opposition Score	Rank
Umidjon Jalolov	Boys' freestyle −48kg	Booysen (RSA); W 10 – 0 ^{VSU}	Gökdeniz (TUR); W 11 – 3 ^{VPO1}	1 Q	Gegelashvili (GEO); W 8 – 2 ^{VPO1}	1st place, gold medalist(s)
Mukhammadrasul Rakhimov	Boys' freestyle −80kg	Marshall (NZL); W 10 – 0 ^{VSU}	Tembotov (RUS); L 0 – 9 ^{VPO}	2 Q	Lee (CAN); W 10 – 0 ^{VSU}	3rd place, bronze medalist(s)

Girls

Athlete	Event	Group stage					Final / RM	Rank
Athlete	Event	Opposition Score	Opposition Score	Opposition Score	Opposition Score	Rank	Opposition Score	Rank
Shokhida Akhmedova	Girls' freestyle −49kg	Raimova (KAZ); W 11 – 0 ^{VSU}	Mosquera (VEN); W 12 – 1 ^{VSU1}	Ikei (USA); W 9 – 8 ^{VFA}	Varakina (BLR); W 3 – 1 ^{VPO1}	1 Q	Malmgren (SWE); L 2 – 2 ^{VFA}	2nd place, silver medalist(s)
Svetlana Oknazarova	Girls' freestyle −73kg	Dzibuk (BLR); L 2 – 6 ^{VPO1}	Jlassi (TUN); W 13 – 2 ^{VSU1}	Machuca (ARG); L 9 – 10 ^{VPO1}	Gök (TUR); W 7 – 0 ^{VFA}	3 Q	Fridlund (SWE); L 0 – 2 ^{VFA}	6
