= Luz Olvera =

Mexican judoka (born 1994)

Personal information
- Born: 1 April 1994 (age 32)
- Occupation: Judoka

Sport
- Country: Mexico
- Sport: Judo
- Weight class: –52 kg

Achievements and titles
- World Champ.: R32 (2017, 2019, 2021)
- Pan American Champ.: (2013, 2017, 2020)
Medal record
Women's judo
Representing Mexico
Pan American Games
Silver medal – second place	2019 Lima	–52 kg
Pan American Championships
Silver medal – second place	2013 San José	–52 kg
Silver medal – second place	2017 Panama City	–52 kg
Silver medal – second place	2020 Guadalajara	–52 kg
Bronze medal – third place	2018 San José	–52 kg
IJF Grand Prix
Gold medal – first place	2017 Cancún	–52 kg

Profile at external databases
- IJF: 11433
- JudoInside.com: 71757
- Updated on 7 December 2022

Luz Olvera (born 1 April 1994) is a Mexican judoka. At the 2019 Pan American Games held in Lima, Peru, she won the silver medal in the women's 52 kg event. She lost against Larissa Pimenta of Brazil in the final.

She competed in the women's 52 kg event at the 2014 World Judo Championships held in Chelyabinsk, Russia. She was eliminated in her first match by Rim Song-sim of North Korea.

In 2019, she competed in the women's 52 kg event at the 2019 World Judo Championships held in Tokyo, Japan. She was eliminated in her second match by Majlinda Kelmendi of Kosovo. In 2020, she won the silver medal in the women's 52 kg event at the 2020 Pan American Judo Championships held in Guadalajara, Mexico.
