= Judo at the 2018 Summer Youth Olympics =

Judo at the III Summer Youth Olympic Games
- Venue: Parque Polideportivo Roca
- Dates: 7–10 October
- No. of events: 9 (4 boys, 4 girls, 1 mixed)

Judo at the 2018 Summer Youth Olympics was held from 7 to 10 October 2018.

== Medal summary ==
=== Medal table ===
Rank	Nation	Gold	Silver	Bronze	Total
–	Mixed-NOCs	1	1	2	4
1	Kazakhstan	1	1	0	2
1	Russia	1	1	0	2
3	Hungary	1	0	1	2
4	Azerbaijan	1	0	0	1
4	Belarus	1	0	0	1
4	Germany	1	0	0	1
4	Romania	1	0	0	1
4	Venezuela	1	0	0	1
9	Mongolia	0	2	0	2
10	Czech Republic	0	1	0	1
10	Georgia	0	1	0	1
10	India	0	1	0	1
10	Tunisia	0	1	0	1
14	Austria	0	0	1	1
14	Belgium	0	0	1	1
14	Brazil	0	0	1	1
14	Canada	0	0	1	1
14	Croatia	0	0	1	1
14	Cuba	0	0	1	1
14	Dominican Republic	0	0	1	1
14	Kosovo	0	0	1	1
14	Netherlands	0	0	1	1
14	Slovenia	0	0	1	1
14	South Korea	0	0	1	1
14	Spain	0	0	1	1
14	Turkey	0	0	1	1
14	Ukraine	0	0	1	1
14	Uzbekistan	0	0	1	1
Totals (28 entries)		9	9	18	36

=== Medallists ===
==== Boys events ====
Event	Gold	Silver	Bronze
55 kg	Artsiom Kolasau; Belarus	Temuujin Ganburged; Mongolia	Oleh Veredyba; Ukraine
55 kg	Artsiom Kolasau; Belarus	Temuujin Ganburged; Mongolia	Daniel Leutgeb; Austria
66 kg	Vugar Talibov; Azerbaijan	Abrek Naguchev; Russia	Antonio Tornal; Dominican Republic
66 kg	Vugar Talibov; Azerbaijan	Abrek Naguchev; Russia	Javier Peña Insausti; Spain
81 kg	Adrian Șulcă; Romania	Martin Bezděk; Czech Republic	Keagan Young; Canada
81 kg	Adrian Șulcă; Romania	Martin Bezděk; Czech Republic	Mark van Dijk; Netherlands
100 kg	Bekarys Saduakas; Kazakhstan	Ilia Sulamanidze; Georgia	Ömer Aydın; Turkey
100 kg	Bekarys Saduakas; Kazakhstan	Ilia Sulamanidze; Georgia	Zsombor Vég; Hungary

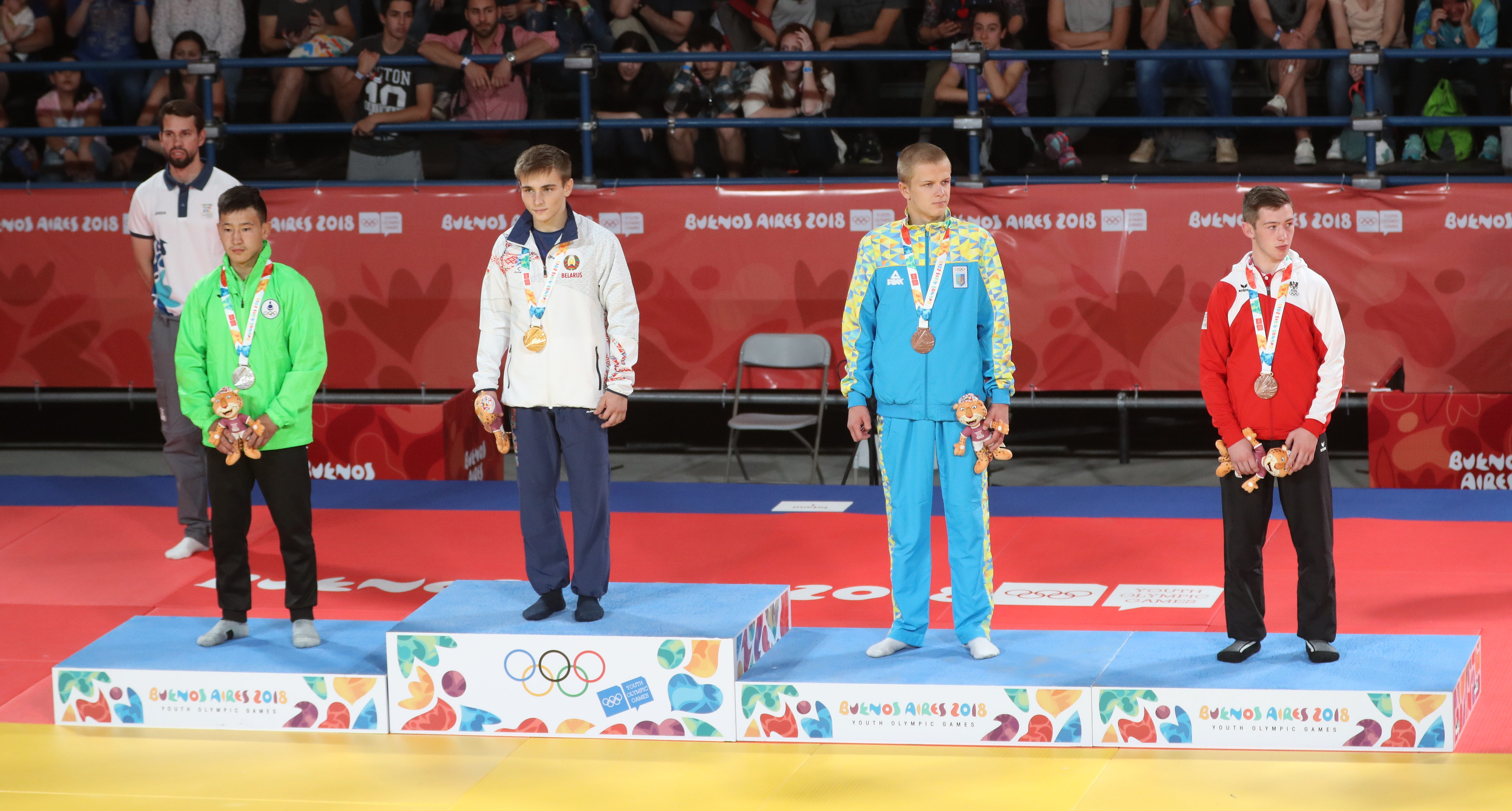
55 kg victory ceremony

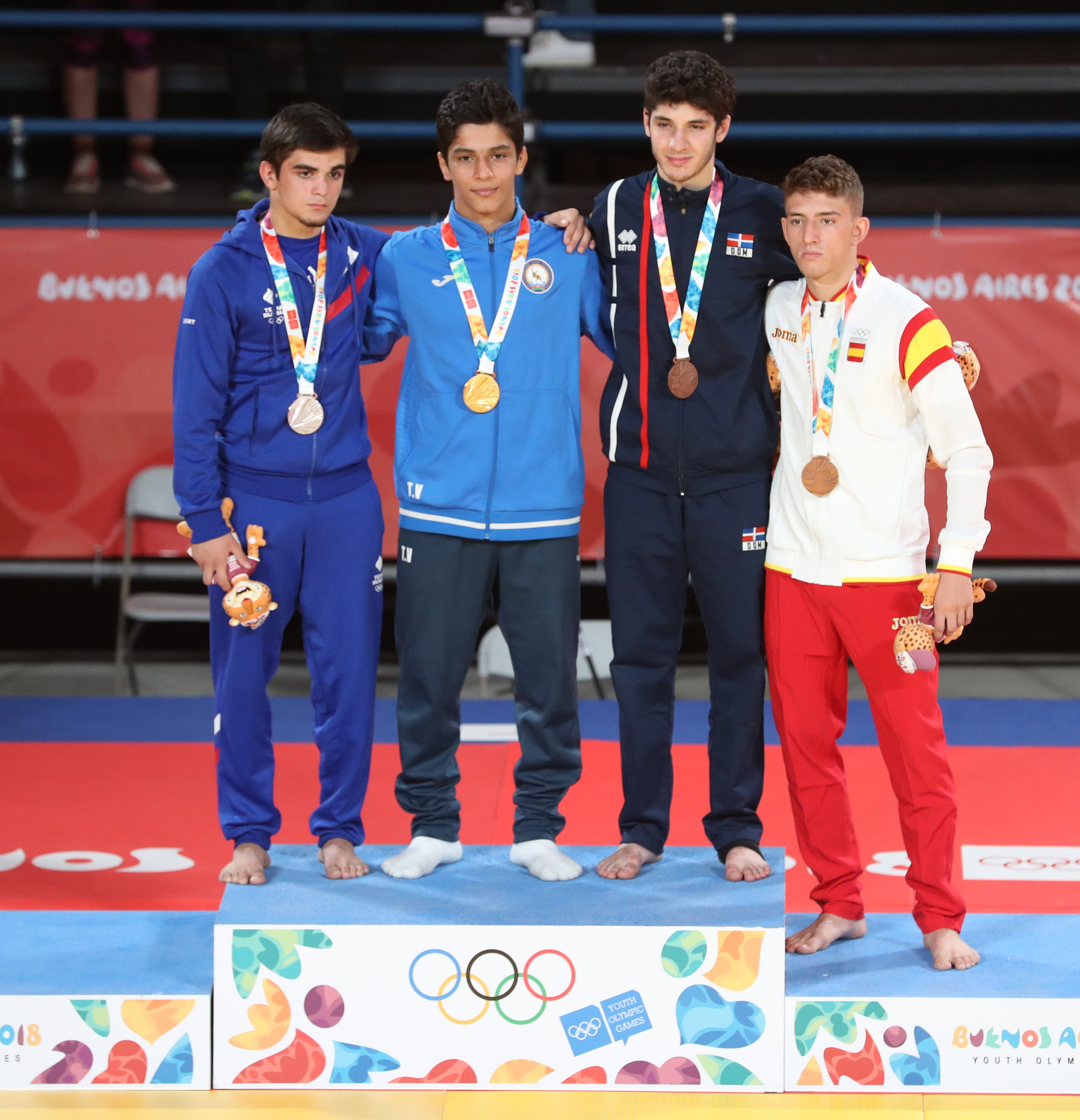
66 kg victory ceremony

==== Girls events ====
Event	Gold	Silver	Bronze
44 kg	María Giménez; Venezuela	Tababi Devi Thangjam; India	Erza Muminoviq; Kosovo
44 kg	María Giménez; Venezuela	Tababi Devi Thangjam; India	Ana Viktorija Puljiz; Croatia
52 kg	Irena Khubulova; Russia	Lkhagvasürengiin Sosorbaram; Mongolia	Nahomys Acosta; Cuba
52 kg	Irena Khubulova; Russia	Lkhagvasürengiin Sosorbaram; Mongolia	Nilufar Ermaganbetova; Uzbekistan
63 kg	Szofi Özbas; Hungary	Mariem Khlifi; Tunisia	Alessia Corrao; Belgium
63 kg	Szofi Özbas; Hungary	Mariem Khlifi; Tunisia	Kim Ju-hee; South Korea
78 kg	Raffaela Igl; Germany	Margarita Gritsenko; Kazakhstan	Eduarda Rosa; Brazil
78 kg	Raffaela Igl; Germany	Margarita Gritsenko; Kazakhstan	Metka Lobnik; Slovenia

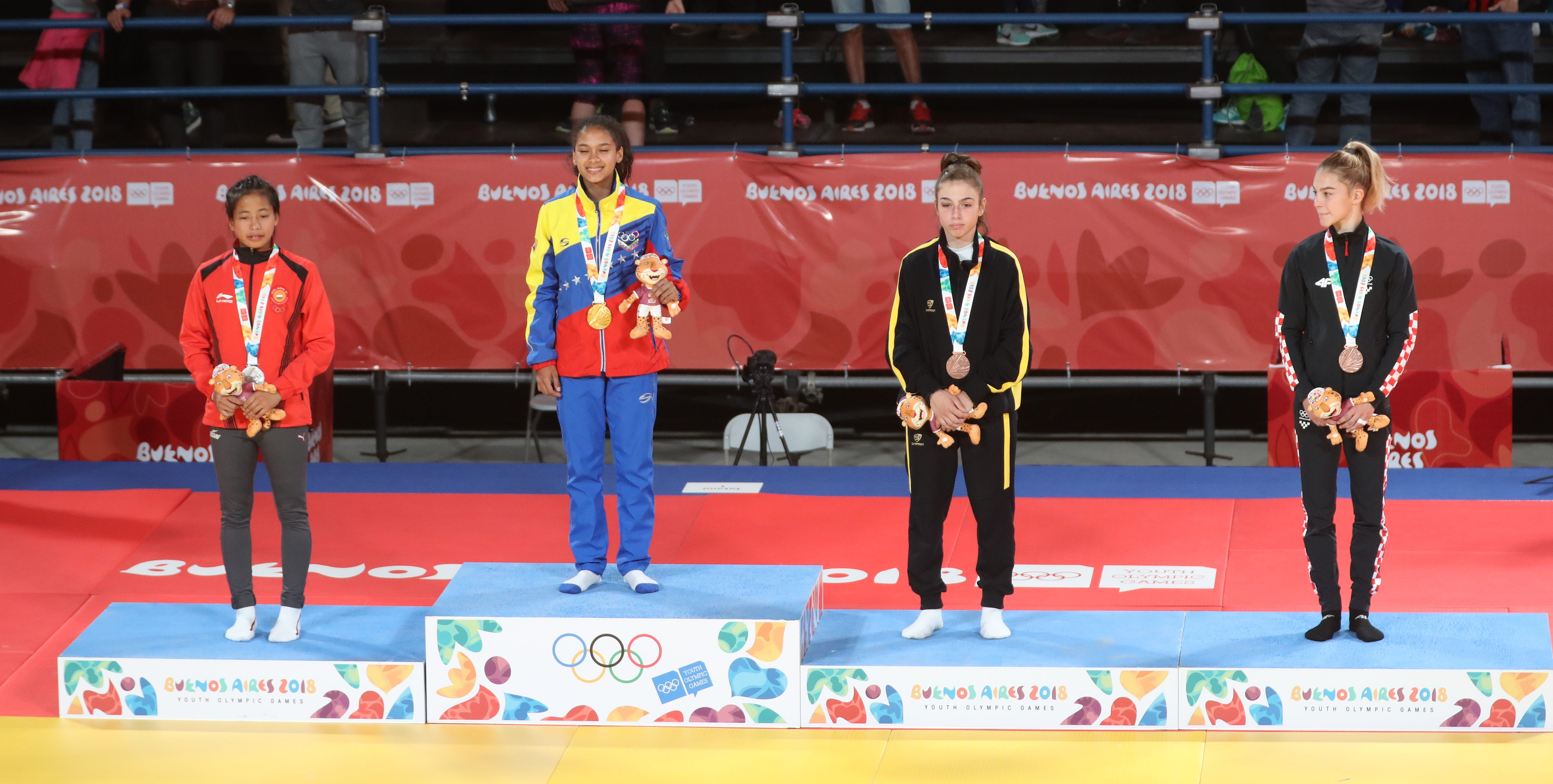
44 kg victory ceremony

==== Team Event ====
Event	Gold	Silver	Bronze
Mixed Team	Beijing; Artsiom Kolasau (BLR); Liu Li-ling (TPE); Jaykhunbek Nazarov (UZB); Carlos Páez (VEN); Itzel Pecha (MEX); Ana Viktorija Puljiz (CRO); Veronica Toniolo (ITA)	Athens; Mireille Andriamifehy (MAD); Martin Bezděk (CZE); Juan Montealegre (COL); Javier Peña (ESP); Christi-Rose Pretorius (ZIM); Tababi Devi Thangjam (IND); Marin Visser (NED); Anwar Zrhari (MAR)	Rio de Janeiro; Milana Charygulyyeva (TKM); Yassamine Djellab (ALG); Metka Lobnik (SLO); Erza Muminoviq (KOS); Abrek Naguchev (RUS); Fleury Nihozeko (BDI); Jamshed Sulaimoni (TJK); Sultan Zhenishbekov (KGZ)
Mixed Team	Beijing; Artsiom Kolasau (BLR); Liu Li-ling (TPE); Jaykhunbek Nazarov (UZB); Carlos Páez (VEN); Itzel Pecha (MEX); Ana Viktorija Puljiz (CRO); Veronica Toniolo (ITA)	Athens; Mireille Andriamifehy (MAD); Martin Bezděk (CZE); Juan Montealegre (COL); Javier Peña (ESP); Christi-Rose Pretorius (ZIM); Tababi Devi Thangjam (IND); Marin Visser (NED); Anwar Zrhari (MAR)	London; Noemí Huayhuameza (PER); Rachel Krapman (CAN); Daniel Leutgeb (AUT); Edith Ortiz (ECU); Ahmed Rebahi (ALG); Bekarys Saduakas (KAZ); João Santos (BRA)

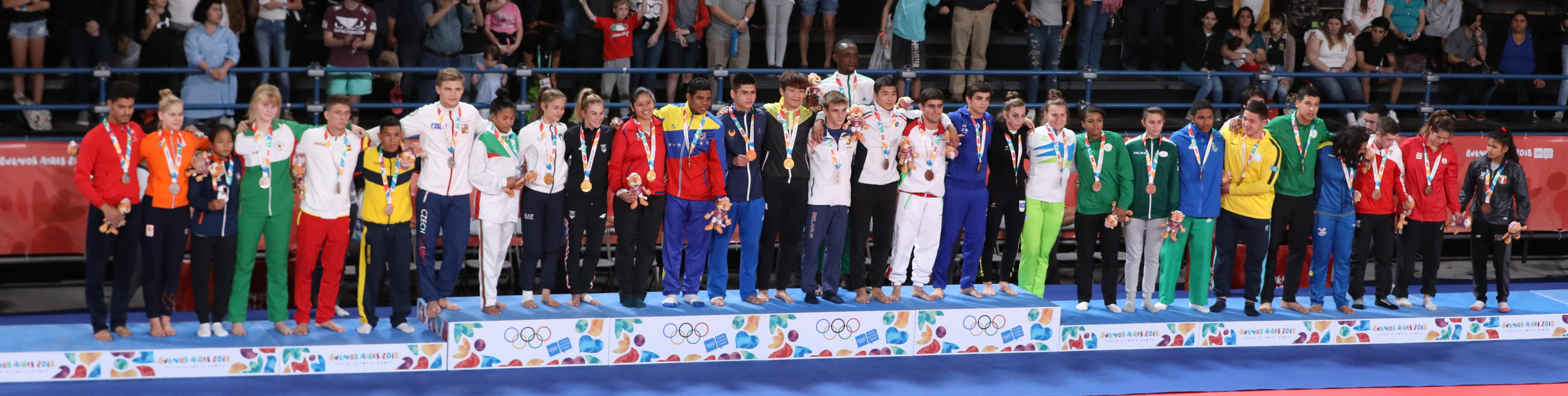
Mixed Team victory ceremony
