= Keagan Young =

Canadian judoka (born 2001)

Personal information
- Born: 30 July 2001 (age 25) Markham, Ontario, Canada
- Occupation: Judoka

Sport
- Country: Canada
- Sport: Judo
- Weight class: ‍–‍81 kg, ‍–‍90 kg

Achievements and titles
- Pan American Champ.: (silver) (2025)
Medal record
Men's judo
Representing Canada
Pan American Championships
Silver medal – second place	2025 Santiago	‍–‍81 kg
IJF Grand Prix
Bronze medal – third place	2026 Zagreb	‍–‍90 kg
Pan American Junior Championships
Bronze medal – third place	2018 La Paz	‍–‍73 kg
World Cadets Championships
Bronze medal – third place	2017 Santiago	‍–‍66 kg
Pan American Cadet Championships
Silver medal – second place	2016 Cordoba	‍–‍55 kg
Bronze medal – third place	2017 Cancún	‍–‍66 kg
Youth Olympic Games
Bronze medal – third place	2018 Buenos Aires	‍–‍81 kg

Profile at external databases
- IJF: 31025
- JudoInside.com: 100891
- Updated on 15 November 2026

Keagan Young (born 30 July 2001) is a Canadian judoka who competes in the men's 90 kg category and formerly in the 81 kg category. Young was raised and lives in Markham, Ontario, Canada.

== Career ==
=== Junior ===
At the 2017 World Judo Cadets Championships in Santiago, Chile, Young won the bronze medal in the 66 kg category.

In July 2018, Young won gold at the Pan American Cadet Judo Championships in Cordoba, Argentina and became the world's number one ranked cadet judoka in the 81 kg category. Young won Canada's first medal at the 2018 Summer Youth Olympics in Buenos Aires, Argentina, a bronze medal in the –81 kg event.

=== Senior ===
In the senior category, Young moved up a weight category to compete in the 90 kg event. At the 2022 Pan American-Oceania Judo Championships in Lima, Peru, Young finished in fifth in the 90 kg category. Young was named to his first national senior multi-sport event team for the 2022 Commonwealth Games in June 2022.
