= Irena Khubulova =

Russian judoka (born 2001)

Personal information
- Nationality: Russian
- Born: 16 June 2001 (age 25)
- Occupation: Judoka

Sport
- Country: Russia (until 2021); United Arab Emirates (since 2025)
- Sport: Judo
- Weight class: ‍–‍48 kg, ‍–‍52 kg

Achievements and titles
- World Champ.: R16 (2021)
Medal record
Women's judo
Representing Russia
IJF Grand Slam
Bronze medal – third place	2021 Kazan	‍–‍48 kg
European U23 Championships
Silver medal – second place	2020 Poreč	‍–‍48 kg
World Juniors Championships
Silver medal – second place	2021 Olbia	‍–‍48 kg
European Junior Championships
Gold medal – first place	2019 Vantaa	‍–‍48 kg
Gold medal – first place	2021 Luxembourg	‍–‍48 kg
European Cadet Championships
Gold medal – first place	2018 Sarajevo	‍–‍48 kg
Silver medal – second place	2016 Vantaa	‍–‍48 kg
Youth Olympic Games
Gold medal – first place	2018 Buenos Aires	‍–‍52 kg

Profile at external databases
- IJF: 31270, 94109
- JudoInside.com: 105507
- Updated on 27 November 2025

Irena Khubulova (born 16 June 2001) is a Russian judoka.
