= Nahomys Acosta =

Cuban judoka (born 2001)

Personal information
- Full name: Nahomys Acosta Batte
- Born: 15 May 2001 (age 25)
- Occupation: Judoka

Sport
- Country: Cuba
- Sport: Judo
- Weight class: –52 kg

Achievements and titles
- Pan American Champ.: (bronze) (2020)
Medal record
Women's judo
Representing Cuba
Pan American Games
Bronze medal – third place	2019 Lima	–52 kg
Pan American Championships
Bronze medal – third place	2020 Guadalajara	–52 kg
Pan American Junior Championships
Silver medal – second place	2018 La Paz	–52 kg
Youth Olympic Games
Bronze medal – third place	2018 Buenos Aires	–52 kg
Central American and Caribbean Games
Gold medal – first place	2018 Barranquilla	Women's team
Bronze medal – third place	2018 Barranquilla	–52 kg

Profile at external databases
- IJF: 41110
- JudoInside.com: 116259
- Updated on 21 February 2022

Nahomys Acosta Batte (born 15 May 2001) is a Cuban judoka. At the 2019 Pan American Games held in Lima, Peru, she won one of the bronze medals in the women's 52 kg event.

== Career ==
In 2018, she won one of the bronze medals in the women's 52 kg event at the 2018 Central American and Caribbean Games held in Barranquilla, Colombia. In the same year, she also competed in the girls' 52 kg and mixed team events at the 2018 Summer Youth Olympics held in Buenos Aires, Argentina.

In 2020, she won one of the bronze medals in the women's 52 kg event at the 2020 Pan American Judo Championships held in Guadalajara, Mexico.

== Achievements ==
Year	Tournament	Place	Weight class
2019	Pan American Games	3rd	−52 kg
2020	Pan American Judo Championships	3rd	−52 kg
