= Lkhagvasürengiin Sosorbaram =

Mongolian judoka (born 2001)

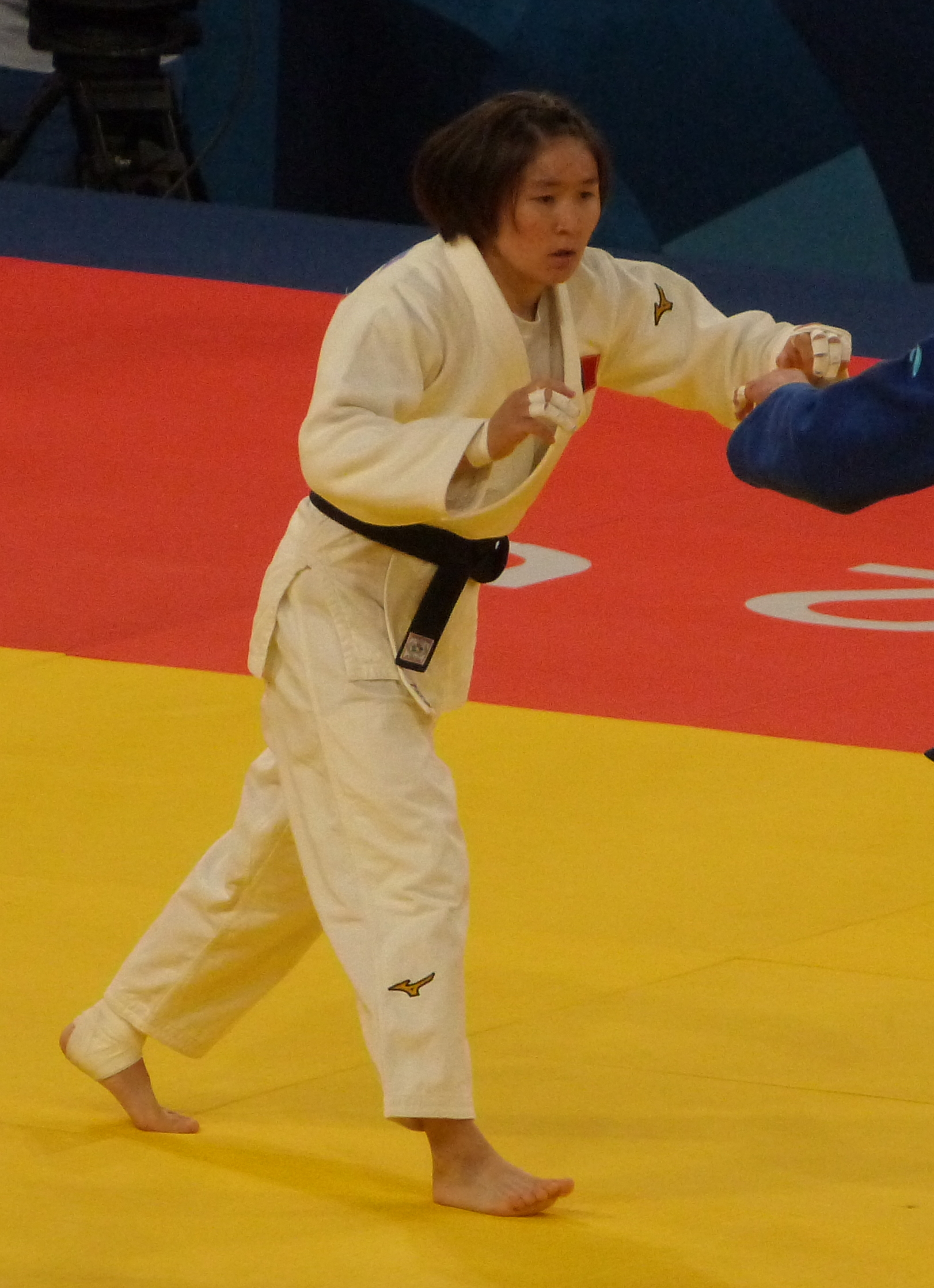

Personal information
- Born: 22 March 2001 (age 25)
- Occupation: Judoka

Sport
- Country: Mongolia
- Sport: Judo
- Weight class: ‍–‍52 kg

Achievements and titles
- Olympic Games: R16 (2020, 2024)
- World Champ.: 7th (2021)
- Asian Champ.: (silver) (2019)
Medal record
Women's judo
Representing Mongolia
Asian Games
Bronze medal – third place	2023 Hangzhou	‍–‍52 kg
Bronze medal – third place	2023 Hangzhou	Mixed team
Asian Championships
Silver medal – second place	2019 Fujairah	‍–‍52 kg
Bronze medal – third place	2024 Hong Kong	‍–‍52 kg
IJF Grand Slam
Silver medal – second place	2019 Düsseldorf	‍–‍52 kg
Silver medal – second place	2021 Tashkent	‍–‍52 kg
Silver medal – second place	2022 Baku	‍–‍52 kg
Silver medal – second place	2024 Abu Dhabi	‍–‍52 kg
Bronze medal – third place	2022 Tokyo	‍–‍52 kg
Bronze medal – third place	2023 Tokyo	‍–‍52 kg
Bronze medal – third place	2024 Tashkent	‍–‍52 kg
Bronze medal – third place	2025 Ulaanbaatar	‍–‍57 kg
IJF Grand Prix
Bronze medal – third place	2025 Qingdao	‍–‍57 kg
World Juniors Championships
Gold medal – first place	2019 Marrakesh	‍–‍52 kg
Asian Cadet Championships
Gold medal – first place	2016 Kochi	‍–‍52 kg
Bronze medal – third place	2017 Bishkek	‍–‍52 kg
Bronze medal – third place	2018 Beirut	‍–‍52 kg
Youth Olympic Games
Silver medal – second place	2018 Buenos Aires	‍–‍52 kg

Profile at external databases
- IJF: 16819
- JudoInside.com: 108184
- Updated on 27 September 2025

Lkhagvasürengiin Sosorbaram (Mongolian: Лхагвасүрэнгийн Сосорбарам, born 22 March 2001) is a Mongolian judoka.

She is the silver medallist of the 2019 Judo Grand Slam Düsseldorf in the ‍–‍52 kg category.
