= Gabon at the 2018 Summer Youth Olympics =

- IOC code: GAB
- NOC: Comité Olympique Gabonais

in Buenos Aires, Argentina 6 – 18 October 2018
- Competitors: 4 in 3 sports
- Medals: Gold 0 Silver 0 Bronze 0 Total 0

Summer Youth Olympics appearances
- 2010; 2014; 2018

Gabon participated at the 2018 Summer Youth Olympics in Buenos Aires, Argentina from 6 October to 18 October 2018.

== Competitors ==
Sport	Boys	Girls	Total
Judo	1	1	2
Swimming	1	1	2
Taekwondo	0	1	1

== Taekwondo ==
- Girls' -55 kg - Merveille Marindi

Athlete	Event	Round of 16	Quarterfinals	Semifinals	Final	Rank
Athlete	Event	Opposition Result	Opposition Result	Opposition Result	Opposition Result	Rank
Merveille Marindi	Girls' −55kg	Safia Salih (MAR); L 1-31	did not advance			
