= Mixed-NOCs at the 2018 Summer Youth Olympics =

Mixed-NOC teams participated under the Olympic flag

Teams made up of athletes representing different National Olympic Committees (NOCs), called mixed-NOCs teams, participated in the 2018 Summer Youth Olympics. These teams participated in either events composed entirely of mixed-NOCs teams, or in events which saw the participation of mixed-NOCs teams and non-mixed-NOCs teams. When a mixed-NOCs team won a medal, the Olympic flag was raised rather than a national flag; if a mixed-NOCs team won gold, the Olympic anthem would be played instead of national anthems. A total of 18 events with Mixed NOCs were held.

== Background ==
The concept of mixed-NOCs was introduced in the 2010 Summer Youth Olympics, in which athletes from different nations would compete in the same team, often representing their continent. This is in contrast to the Mixed team (IOC code: ZZX) found at early senior Olympic Games.

== Archery ==
Event	Gold	Silver	Bronze
Mixed team	Kyla Touraine-Helias (FRA); Jose Manuel Solera (ESP)	Agustina Sofia Giannasio (ARG); Aitthiwat Soithong (THA)	Quinn Reddig (NAM); Trenton Cowles (USA)

== Badminton ==
Event	Gold	Silver	Bronze
Mixed teams	Alpha; Lakshya Sen (IND); Giovanni Toti (ITA); Vannthoun Vath (CAM); Brian Yang (CAN); Hasini Nusaka Ambalangodage (SRI); Maria Delcheva (BUL); Jennie Gai (USA); Ashwathi Pillai (SWE)	Omega; Markus Barth (NOR); Oscar Guo (NZL); Chang Ho Kim (FIJ); Kunlavut Vitidsarn (THA); Huang Yin-hsuan (TPE); Léonice Huet (FRA); Anastasiya Prozorova (UKR); Vũ Thị Anh Thư (VIE)	Theta; Julien Carraggi (BEL); Mohamed Mostafa Kamel (EGY); Kodai Naraoka (JPN); Lukas Resch (GER); Zecily Fung (AUS); Jaqueline Lima (BRA); Hirari Mizui (JPN); Tereza Švábíková (CZE)

== Cycling ==
Cycling featured a mixed team competition with one mixed-NOC entry, but medals were won by individual NOCs.

== Dancesport ==
Event	Gold	Silver	Bronze
Breaking Mixed Team	Ram (JPN); B4 (VIE)	Lexy (ITA); Broly (ARG)	Ella (AUT); Bumblebee (RUS)

== Diving ==
Event	Gold	Silver	Bronze
Mixed team	Lin Shan (CHN); Daniel Restrepo (COL)	Elena Wassen (GER); Lian Junjie (CHN)	Sofiya Lyskun (UKR); Ruslan Ternovoi (RUS)

== Equestrian ==
Event	Gold	Silver	Bronze
Team Jumping	North America; Nicole Meyer Robredo (MEX); Mateo Philippe Coles (HAI); Marissa del Pilar Thompson (PAN); Pedro Espinosa (HON); Mattie Hatcher (USA)	Europe; Jack Whitaker (GBR); Giacomo Casadei (ITA); Vince Jarmy (HUN); Rowen van de Mheen (NED); Simon Jan G Morssinkhof (BEL)	Africa; Ahmed Nasser Elnaggar (EGY); Brianagh Lindsay Clark (ZIM); Anna Bunty Howard (ZAM); Hannah Ivy Carton (RSA); Margaux Koenig (MRI)

== Fencing ==
Event	Gold	Silver	Bronze
Mixed Team Event	Europe 1 Kateryna Chorniy (UKR); Martina Favaretto (ITA); Liza Pusztai (HUN); Davide Di Veroli (ITA); Armand Spichiger (FRA); Krisztian Rabb (HUN)	Asia-Oceania 1 Hsieh Kaylin Sin Yan (HKG); Yuka Ueno (JPN); Lee Ju-eun (KOR); Khasan Baudunov (KGZ); Chen Yi-tung (HKG); Jun Hyun (KOR)	Americas 1 Emily Vermeule (USA); May Tieu (USA); Natalia Botello (MEX); Isaac Herbst (USA); Kenji Bravo (USA); Robert Vidovszky (USA)

== Golf ==
Golf featured mixed team competition with one mixed-NOC entry, but medals were won by individual NOCs.

== Gymnastics ==
Games	Gold	Silver	Bronze
Mixed multi-discipline team	Team Simone Biles; Mariela Kostadinova (BUL); Panayot Dimitrov (BUL); Ruan Lange (RSA); Krisztián Balázs (HUN); Nazar Chepurnyi (UKR); Tamara Anika Ong (SGP); Phạm Như Phương (VIE); Alba Petisco (ESP); Talisa Torretti (ITA); Daria Trubnikova (RUS); Yelizaveta Luzan (AZE); Liam Christie (AUS); Fan Xinyi (CHN)	Team Max Whitlock; Madalena Cavilhas (POR); Manuel Candeias (POR); Fernando Martín Espíndola (ARG); Takeru Kitazono (JPN); Pablo Calvache (ECU); Camila Montoya (CRC); Ksenia Klimenko (RUS); Zeina Ibrahim (EGY); Rayna Khai Ling Hoh (MAS); Roza Abitova (KAZ); Adelina Beljajeva (EST); Robert Vilarasau (ESP); Jessica Clarke (GBR)	Team Oksana Chusovitina; Viktoryia Akhotnikava (BLR); Ilya Famenkou (BLR); Brandon Briones (USA); Adam Tobin (GBR); Mohamed Afify (EGY); Indira Ulmasova (UZB); Karla Perez (GUA); Tonya Paulsson (SWE); Lidiia Iakovleva (AUS); Aino Yamada (JPN); Lilly Rotaermel (GER); Santiago Escallier (ARG); Antonia Sakellaridou (GRE)

== Judo ==
Event	Gold	Silver	Bronze
Mixed team	Beijing; Artsiom Kolasau (BLR); Liu Li-ling (TPE); Jaykhunbek Nazarov (UZB); Carlos Páez (VEN); Itzel Pecha (MEX); Ana Viktorija Puljiz (SLO); Veronica Toniolo (ITA)	Athens; Mireille Andriamifehy (MAD); Martin Bezděk (CZE); Juan Montealegre (COL); Javier Peña Insausti (ESP); Christi Rose Pretorius (ZIM); Tababi Devi Thangjam (IND); Marin Visser (NED); Anwar Zrhari (MAR)	Rio de Janeiro; Milana Charygulyyeva (TKM); Yassamine Djellab (ALG); Metka Lobnik (SLO); Erza Muminoviq (KOS); Abrek Naguchev (RUS); Fleury Nihozeko (BDI); Jamshed Sulaimoni (TJK); Sultan Zhenishbekov (KGZ)
Mixed team	Beijing; Artsiom Kolasau (BLR); Liu Li-ling (TPE); Jaykhunbek Nazarov (UZB); Carlos Páez (VEN); Itzel Pecha (MEX); Ana Viktorija Puljiz (SLO); Veronica Toniolo (ITA)	Athens; Mireille Andriamifehy (MAD); Martin Bezděk (CZE); Juan Montealegre (COL); Javier Peña Insausti (ESP); Christi Rose Pretorius (ZIM); Tababi Devi Thangjam (IND); Marin Visser (NED); Anwar Zrhari (MAR)	London; Noemi Huayhuameza Orneta (PER); Rachel Krapman (CAN); Daniel Leutgeb (AUT); Edith Ortiz (ECU); Ahmed Rebahi (ALG); Bekarys Saduakas (KAZ); João Santos (BRA)

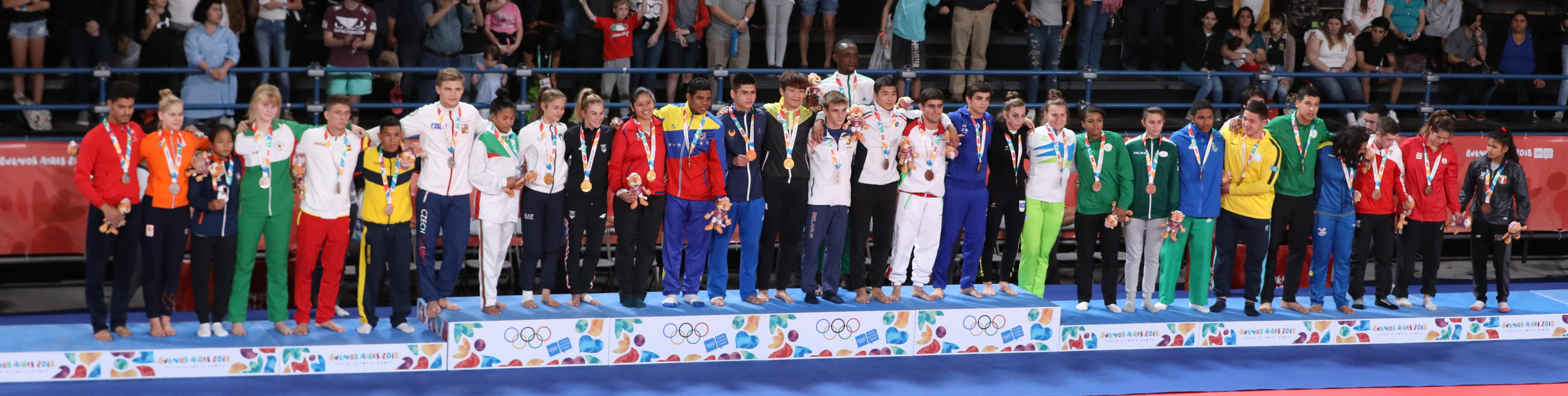
Mixed Team victory ceremony

== Modern pentathlon ==
Event	Gold	Silver	Bronze
Mixed relay	Gu Yewen (CHN); Ahmed Elgendy (EGY)	Salma Abdelmaksoud (EGY); Franco Serrano (ARG)	Laura Heredia (ESP); Kamil Kasperczak (POL)

== Shooting ==
Event	Gold	Silver	Bronze
Mixed Teams' 10m Air Rifle	Enkhmaa Erdenechuluun (MGL); Zalan Pekler (HUN)	Anastasiia Dereviagina (RUS); Edson Ismael Ramírez Ramos (MEX)	Viivi Natalia Kemppi (FIN); Facundo Firmapaz (ARG)
Mixed Teams' 10m Air Pistol	Vanessa Seeger (GER); Kiril Kirov (BUL)	Manu Bhaker (IND); Bezhan Fayzullaev (TJK)	Andrea Victoria Ibarra Miranda (MEX); Dmytro Honta (UKR)

== Table tennis ==
Table tennis featured mixed team competition, but medals were won by individual NOCs.

== Tennis ==
Event	Gold	Silver	Bronze
Boys' doubles	Won by a team representing the individual NOC of Argentina	Adrian Andreev (BUL); Rinky Hijikata (AUS)	Won by a team representing the individual NOC of France
Girls' doubles	Kaja Juvan (SLO); Iga Świątek (POL)	Won by a team representing the individual NOC of Japan	Won by a team representing the individual NOC of China
Mixed doubles	Medals in this event were won by individual NOCs		

== Triathlon ==
Event	Gold	Silver	Bronze
Mixed relay	Europe 1 Sif Bendix Madsen (DEN); Alessio Crociani (ITA); Anja Weber (SUI); Alexandre Montez (POR)	Oceania 1 Charlotte Derbyshire (AUS); Dylan McCullough (NZL); Brea Roderick (NZL); Joshua Ferris (AUS)	Europe 3 Marie Horn (GER); Henry Graf (GER); Emilie Noyer (FRA); Igor Bellido Mikhailova (ESP)

== See also ==
- 2018 Summer Youth Olympics medal table
- Mixed-NOCs at the Youth Olympics
