= Morocco at the 2018 Summer Youth Olympics =

- IOC code: MAR
- NOC: Moroccan Olympic Committee
- Website: http://www.marocolympique.org/

in Buenos Aires, Argentina 6 – 18 October 2018
- Competitors: 20 in 8 sports
- Medals Ranked 43rd: Gold 1 Silver 5 Bronze 1 Total 7

Summer Youth Olympics appearances (overview)
- 2010; 2014; 2018; 2026

Morocco participated at the 2018 Summer Youth Olympics in Buenos Aires, Argentina from 6 October to 18 October 2018.

== Medals ==
Medals awarded to participants of mixed-NOC (combined) teams are represented in italics. These medals are not counted towards the individual NOC medal tally.

Medal	Name	Sport	Event	Date
Gold	Fatima-Ezzahra Aboufaras	Taekwondo	Girls' +63 kg	11 October
Silver	Anass Essayi	Athletics	1500 metres	15 October
Silver	Yassine Elouarz	Boxing	Boys' -69 kg	17 October
Silver	Anwar Zrhari	Judo	Mixed team	10 October
Silver	Nabil Ech-Chaabi	Karate	Boys' +68 kg	18 October
Silver	Yassine Sekouri	Karate	Boys' 68 kg	18 October
Silver	Safia Salih	Taekwondo	Girls' −55kg	9 October
Bronze	Oussama Edari	Karate	Boys' 61 kg	17 October

Medals by sport
Sport	1st place, gold medalist(s)	2nd place, silver medalist(s)	3rd place, bronze medalist(s)	Total
Athletics	0	1	0	1
Boxing	0	1	0	1
Karate	0	2	1	3
Taekwondo	1	1	0	2
Total	1	5	1	7

== Athletics ==
Boys
Track and road events

Athlete	Event	Stage 1		Stage 2		Total	
Athlete	Event	Result	Rank	Result	Rank	Total	Rank
Mohamed Abouettahery	400 metres	1:51.17	6	1:51.03	4	3:42.20	5
Anass Essayi	1500 metres	3:53.75	2	11:35	2	4	2nd place, silver medalist(s)
Abderrazzak Mouzdahir	110 metre hurdles	13.76	3	13.57	4	27.33	4
Hamza Sekhmani	2000 metre steeplechase	DNF					

Girls
Track and road events

Athlete	Event	Stage 1		Stage 2		Total	
Athlete	Event	Result	Rank	Result	Rank	Total	Rank
Meryeme Azrour	1500 metres	4:21.22	3	13:33	5	8	5

== Boxing ==
Boys

Athlete	Event	Preliminary R1	Preliminary R2	Semifinals	Final / RM	Rank
Athlete	Event	Opposition Result	Opposition Result	Opposition Result	Opposition Result	Rank
Abdessamad Abbaz	-56 kg	Bye	Amram (NRU); W 5–0	Halinichev (UKR); L 0–5	Cuello (ARG); L 0-5	4
Mohammed Boulaouja	-64 kg	Maliqi (KOS); W 3–2	—N/a	Shaiken (KAZ); L RSC R3 2:19	Azim (GBR); L RSC R2 1:49	4
Yassine Elouarz	-69 kg	Bye	Tauta (ASA); W 5–0	Hasanov (AZE); W 4–1	Arregui (ARG); L 0–5	2nd place, silver medalist(s)

Girls

Athlete	Event	Preliminaries	Semifinals	Final / RM	Rank
Athlete	Event	Opposition Result	Opposition Result	Opposition Result	Rank
Hind Moustakim	-57 kg	Carrillo Carrillo (MEX); L 0–5	did not advance		5

== Judo ==
Individual

Athlete	Event	Round of 16	Quarterfinals	Semifinals	Rep 1	Rep 2	Rep 3	Final / BM	
Athlete	Event	Opposition Result	Opposition Result	Opposition Result	Opposition Result	Opposition Result	Opposition Result	Opposition Result	Rank
Anwar Zrhari	Boys' 81 kg	Martin Bezděk (CZE); L 01-10	did not advance		Keagan Young (CAN); L 00-10	did not advance			
Mireille Andriamifehy	Girls' 52 kg	Fatime Barka (CHA); W 01-00s2	Irena Khubulova (RUS); L 00s1-10	did not advance	Bye	Noemí Huayhuameza (PER); L 00s1-01s2	did not advance		

Team

Athletes	Event	Round of 16	Quarterfinals	Semifinals	Final	
Athletes	Event	Opposition Result	Opposition Result	Opposition Result	Opposition Result	Rank
Team Athens; Mireille Andriamifehy (MAD); Martin Bezděk (CZE); Juan Montealegre (COL); Javier Peña Insausti (ESP); Christi Rose Pretorius (ZIM); Tababi Devi Thangjam (IND); Marin Visser (NED); Anwar Zrhari (MAR)	Mixed team	Bye	Team Los Angeles (MIX); W 5–3	Team Rio de Janeiro (MIX); W 5–3	Team Beijing (MIX); L 4–5	2nd place, silver medalist(s)
Team Atlanta; Tiguidanke Camara (GUI); Aleksa Georgieva (BUL); Vusala Karimova (AZE); Adrián Medero (PUR); Rok Pogorevc (SLO); Fatine Rzal (MAR); Adrian Sulca (ROU); Antonio Tornal (DOM)	Mixed team	Team Barcelona (MIX); W 4–3	Team Barcelona (MIX); L 3–4	did not advance		

== Karate ==
Morocco qualified two athletes based on its performance at one of the Karate Qualification Tournaments.

- Boys' 61 kg - Oussama Edari
- Boys' -68 kg - Yassine Sekouri
- Boys' +68 kg - Nabil Ech-Chaabi

Athlete	Event	Group Stage				Semifinal	Final / BM	
Athlete	Event	Opposition Score	Opposition Score	Opposition Score	Rank	Opposition Score	Opposition Score	Rank
Oussama Edari	Boys' 61 kg	Pedropablo de la Roca (GUA); W (4–1)	Alireza Farajikouhikheili (IRI); W (4–0)	Masaki Yamaoka (JPN); D (0–0)	2	Mohammed Al-Assiri (KSA); L (0–2)	did not advance	3rd place, bronze medalist(s)
Yassine Sekouri	Boys' 68 kg	Kotaro Nakamura (JPN); W (8–2)	Abilmansur Batyrgali (KAZ); D (0–0)	Juan Salsench (ARG); W (1–0)	1	Rosario Ruggiero (ITA); W (5–0)	Quentin Mahauden (BEL); L (0–1)	2nd place, silver medalist(s)
Nabil Ech-Chaabi	Boys' +68 kg	Raukawa Jefferies (NZL); D (0-0)	Robert Avakimov (RUS); W (8-0)	Enes Bulut (TUR); D (0-0)	2	Sean McCarthy Crean (IRL); W (2-1)	Navid Mohammadi (IRI); L (0–5)	2nd place, silver medalist(s)

== Sailing ==
Morocco qualified one boat based on its performance at the African and European IKA Twin Tip Racing Qualifiers.

- Boys' IKA Twin Tip Racing - 1 boat

Athlete	Event	Race													Net points	Final rank
Athlete	Event	1	2	3	4	5	6	7	8	9	10	11	12	M*	Net points	Final rank
Jonas Ouahmid	Boys' TTR	(12)	6	(12)	11	12	9	–	–	–	–	–	–		38	11

== Swimming ==
Athlete	Event	Heats		Semifinals		Final	
Athlete	Event	Time	Rank	Time	Rank	Time	Rank
Ahmed Yassine Fliyou	Boys' 50 metre breaststroke	29.59	23	did not advance			
Samy Ahmed Boutouil	Boys' 50 metre breaststroke	29.12	14	29.10	15	did not advance	
Samy Ahmed Boutouil	Boys' 100 metre butterfly	56.95	35	did not advance			

== Taekwondo ==
Morocco qualified two athletes during the WORLD TAEKWONDO QUALIFICATION TOURNAMENT FOR BUENOS AIRES 2018 YOUTH OLYMPIC GAMES.

- Girls' -55 kg - Safia Salih
- Girls' +63 kg - Fatima-Ezzahra Aboufaras

Athlete	Event	Round of 16	Quarterfinals	Semifinals	Final	Rank
Athlete	Event	Opposition Result	Opposition Result	Opposition Result	Opposition Result	Rank
Safia Salih	Girls' −55kg	Merveille Marindi (GAB); W 31-1	Rama Abo-Alrub (JOR); W 12-8	Sandy Macedo (BRA); W 4-1	Kanthida Saengsin (THA); L 6-10	2nd place, silver medalist(s)
Fatima-Ezzahra Aboufaras	Girls' +63 kg	—N/a	Marcelina Koszel (POL); W 20-4	Mu Wenzhe (CHN); W 17-2	Kimia Hemati (IRI); W 18-16	1st place, gold medalist(s)

== Wrestling ==
Morocco qualified one wrestler based on its performance at the 2018 African Cadet Championships.

Key:
- VFA – Victory by Fall
- VSU – Without any points scored by the opponent
- VSU1 – With point(s) scored by the opponent
- VPO – Without any points scored by the opponent
- VPO1 – With point(s) scored by the opponent

Athlete	Event	Group stage					Final / RM	Rank
Athlete	Event	Opposition Score	Opposition Score	Opposition Score	Opposition Score	Rank	Opposition Score	Rank
Zineb Ech-Chabki	Girls' freestyle −49kg	Szenttamási (HUN); W 8 – 4 ^{VPO1}	Malmgren (SWE); L 0 – 4 ^{VFA}	Sim (CAM); W 8 – 0 ^{VFA}	Duenas (GUM); W 12 – 0 ^{VSU}	2 Q	Varakina (BLR); L 1 – 12 ^{VSU1}	4
