= Karate at the 2018 Summer Youth Olympics =

Karate at the III Summer Youth Olympic Games
- Venue: Europa Pavilion
- Dates: 17–18 October
- No. of events: 6 (3 boys, 3 girls)
- Competitors: 48 (24 boys, 24 girls) from 33 nations

Karate at the 2018 Summer Youth Olympics was held from 17 to 18 October at Europa Pavilion in Buenos Aires, Argentina. This marked the debut of Karate at the Youth Olympics.

== Qualification ==
Each National Olympic Committee (NOC) could enter a maximum of 6 competitors, 3 per gender and one per event. As hosts, Argentina was given 4 quotas, 2 per gender. A further four places, two per gender, were granted by the Tripartite Commission. The remaining 40 places were to be decided in various ways; namely, the Youth Olympic Rankings and two qualification tournaments. Furthermore, all continents are guaranteed at least one athlete representation.

To be eligible to participate in these events, athletes must have been born between 1 January 2001 and 31 December 2002.

=== Boys ===
Event	Location	Date	Places	-61 kg	-68 kg	+68 kg
Host Nation	-	-	-	Rodrigo Tello (ARG)	Juan Salsench (ARG)	
Youth Olympic Rankings	-	1 June 2018	2	Masaki Yamaoka (JPN); Fahik Vaseli (MKD)	Rosario Ruggiero (ITA); Abilmansur Batyrgali (KAZ)	Enes Bulut (TUR); Tomáš Kósa (SVK)
Karate Qualification Tournament 1	(Croatia) Umag	29 June 2018	2	Mohammad Al-Assiri (KSA); Abdallah Hammad (JOR)	Robert Shyroian (UKR); Kotaro Nakamura (JPN)	Keisei Sakiyama (JPN); Robert Avakimov (RUS)
Karate Qualification Tournament 2	(Croatia) Umag	30 June 2018	2	Alireza Faraji (IRI); Pedro de la Roca (GUA)	Yassine Sekouri (MAR); Quentin Mahauden (BEL)	Nabil Ech-Chaabi (MAR); Navid Mohammadi (IRI)
Continental Representation	-	-	-			Raukawa Jefferies (NZL)
Reallocation	-	-	-	Oussama Edari (MAR)		Sean McCarthy (IRL)
Tripartite Invitation	-	-	-		Bojan Bošković (MNE)	
TOTAL				8	8	8

=== Girls ===
Event	Location	Date	Places	-53 kg	-59 kg	+59 kg
Host Nation	-	-	-			
Youth Olympic Rankings	-	1 June 2018	2	Damla Ocak (TUR); Rinka Tahata (JPN)	Charlotte Hope (GBR); Kokoro Sakaji (JPN)	Kyriaki Kydonaki (GRE); Laura Lyok (DEN)
Karate Qualification Tournament 1	(Croatia) Umag	29 June 2018	2	Aika Okazaki (THA); Yasmin Nasr El-Gewily (EGY)	Anna Chernysheva (RUS); Mobina Heidari (IRI)	Janessa Fonseca (PUR); Annika Sælid (NOR)
Karate Qualification Tournament 2	(Croatia) Umag	30 June 2018	2	Fatemeh Khonakdar (IRI); Dildora Alikulova (UZB)	Zsófia Baranyi (HUN); Ivana Perović (SRB)	Sakura Sawashima (JPN); Lauren Salisbury (GBR)
Continental Representation	-	-	-			
Reallocation	-	-	-	Tânia Barros (POR); Catalina Valdés (CHI)	Assia Oukhattou (FRA); Marta Ossipova (EST)	Negin Altooni (IRI)
Tripartite Invitation	-	-	-			Sarah Al-Ameri (UAE)
TOTAL				8	8	8

=== Summary ===
NOC	Boys			Girls			Total
NOC	-61 kg	-68 kg	+68 kg	-53 kg	-59 kg	+59 kg	Total
Argentina	X	X					2
Belgium		X					1
Chile				X			1
Denmark						X	1
Egypt				X			1
Estonia					X		1
France					X		1
Great Britain					X	X	2
Greece						X	1
Guatemala	X						1
Hungary					X		1
Iran	X		X	X	X	X	5
Ireland			X				1
Italy		X					1
Japan	X	X	X	X	X	X	6
Jordan	X						1
Kazakhstan		X					1
Macedonia	X						1
Montenegro		X					1
Morocco	X	X	X				3
New Zealand			X				1
Norway						X	1
Portugal				X			1
Puerto Rico						X	1
Russia			X		X		2
Saudi Arabia	X						1
Serbia					X		1
Slovakia			X				1
Thailand				X			1
Turkey			X	X			2
Ukraine		X					1
United Arab Emirates						X	1
Uzbekistan				X			1
33 NOCs	8	8	8	8	8	8	48

== Medal summary ==
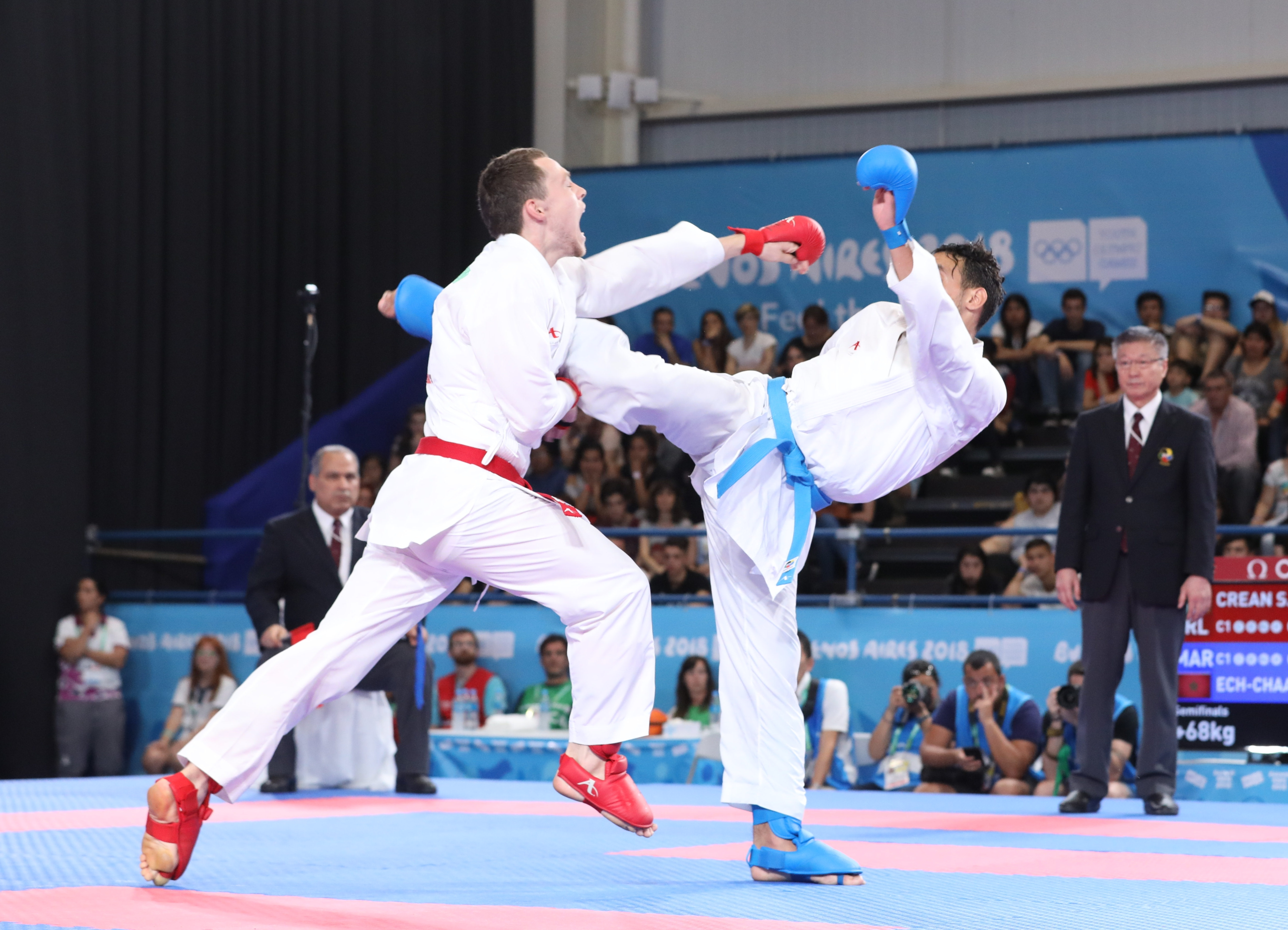
Bronze medal match at the 2018 Summer Youth Olympics

=== Medal table ===
Rank	Nation	Gold	Silver	Bronze	Total
1	Japan	1	3	0	4
2	Iran	1	0	3	4
3	Belgium	1	0	0	1
3	Egypt	1	0	0	1
3	Norway	1	0	0	1
3	Saudi Arabia	1	0	0	1
7	Morocco	0	2	1	3
8	Russia	0	1	0	1
9	Great Britain	0	0	1	1
9	Ireland	0	0	1	1
9	Italy	0	0	1	1
9	Kazakhstan	0	0	1	1
9	North Macedonia	0	0	1	1
9	Serbia	0	0	1	1
9	Turkey	0	0	1	1
9	Uzbekistan	0	0	1	1
Totals (16 entries)		6	6	12	24

=== Boys events ===
Event	Gold	Silver	Bronze
Boys' 61 kg	Mohammed Ayed Al Assiri; Saudi Arabia	Masaki Yamaoka; Japan	Oussama Edari; Morocco Fahik Veseli; Macedonia
Boys' 68 kg	Quentin Mahauden; Belgium	Yassine Sekouri; Morocco	Abilmansur Batyrgali; Kazakhstan Rosario Ruggiero; Italy
Boys' +68 kg	Navid Mohammadi; Iran	Nabil Ech-Chaabi; Morocco	Enes Bulut; Turkey Sean McCarthy Crean; Ireland

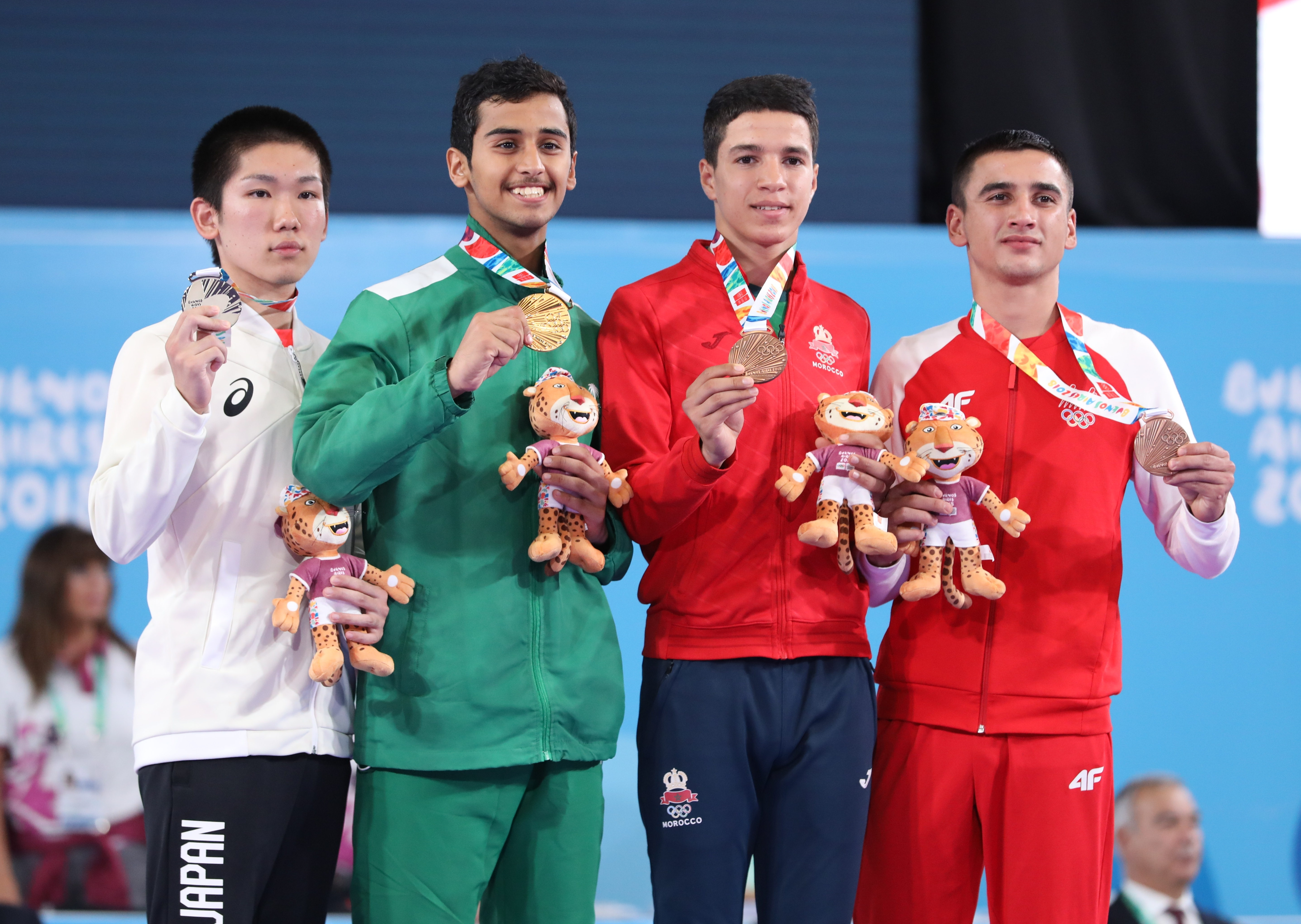
Boys' 61 kg victory ceremony

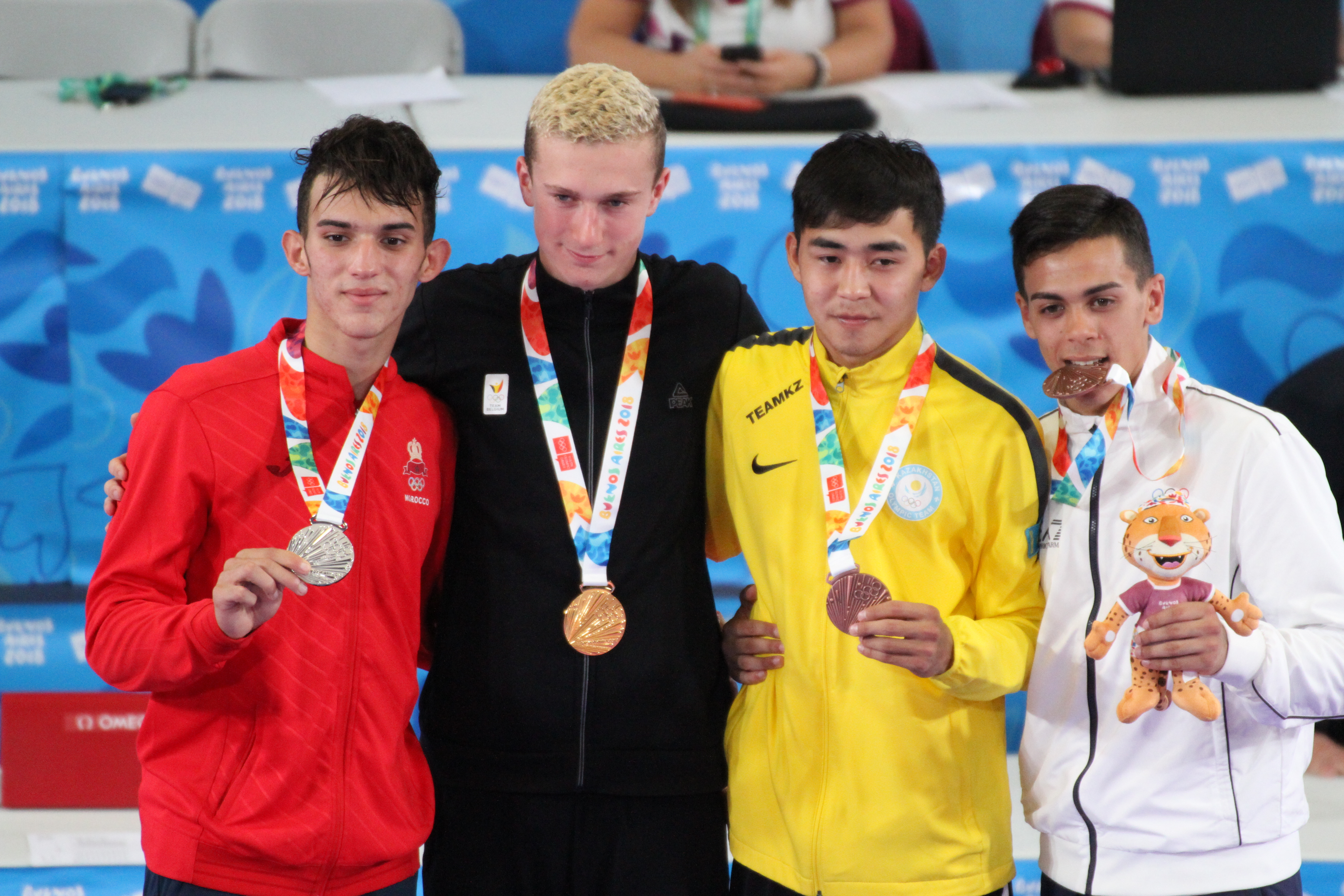
Boys' 68 kg victory ceremony

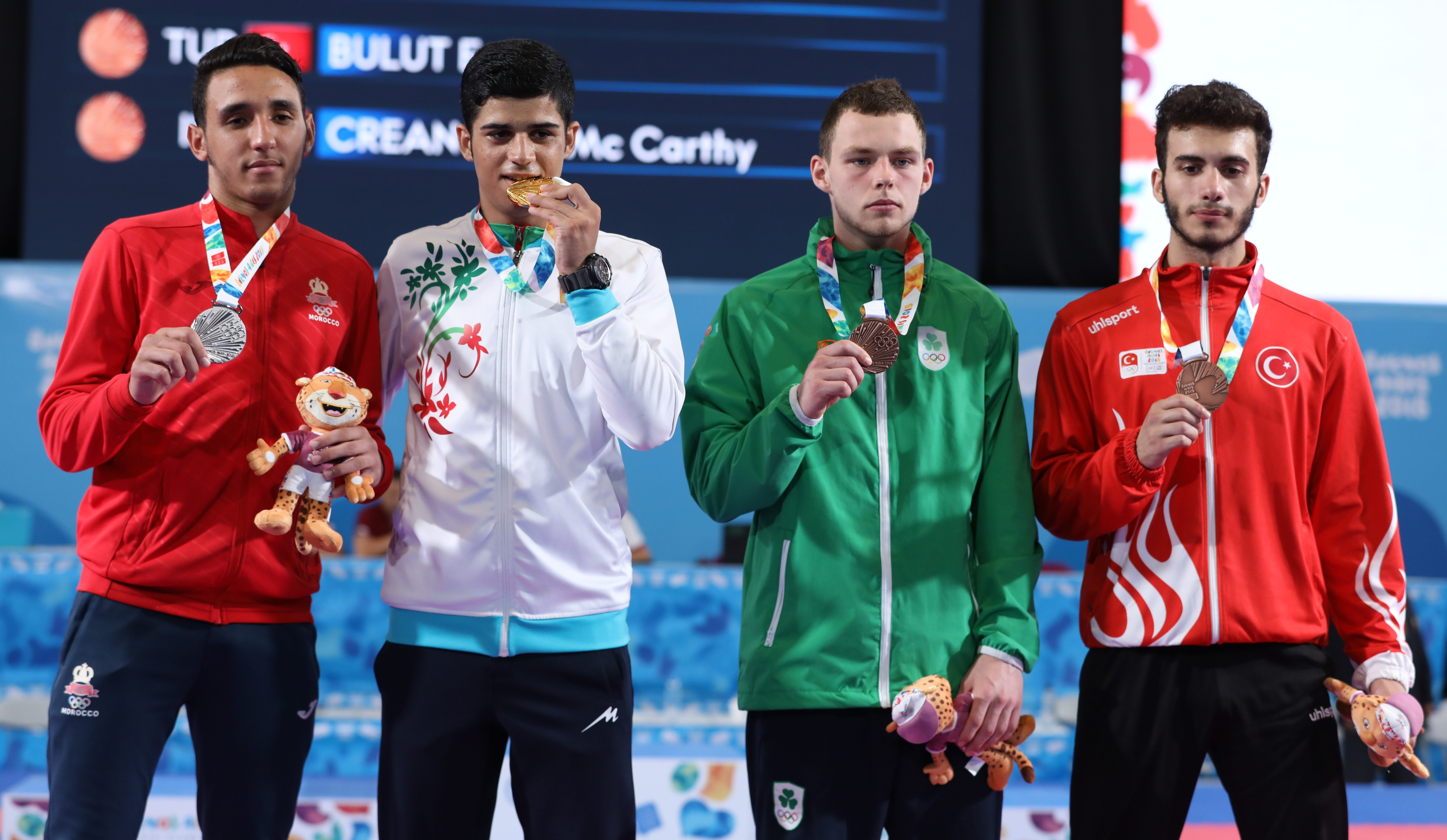
Boys' +68 kg victory ceremony

=== Girls events ===
Event	Gold	Silver	Bronze
Girls' 53 kg	Yasmin Nasr Elgewily; Egypt	Rinka Tahata; Japan	Fatemeh Khonakdar; Iran Dildora Alikulova; Uzbekistan
Girls' 59 kg	Kokoro Sakaji; Japan	Anna Chernysheva; Russia	Mobina Heidari; Iran Ivana Perovic; Serbia
Girls' +59 kg	Annika Sælid; Norway	Sakura Sawashima; Japan	Lauren Salisbury; Great Britain Negin Altooni; Iran

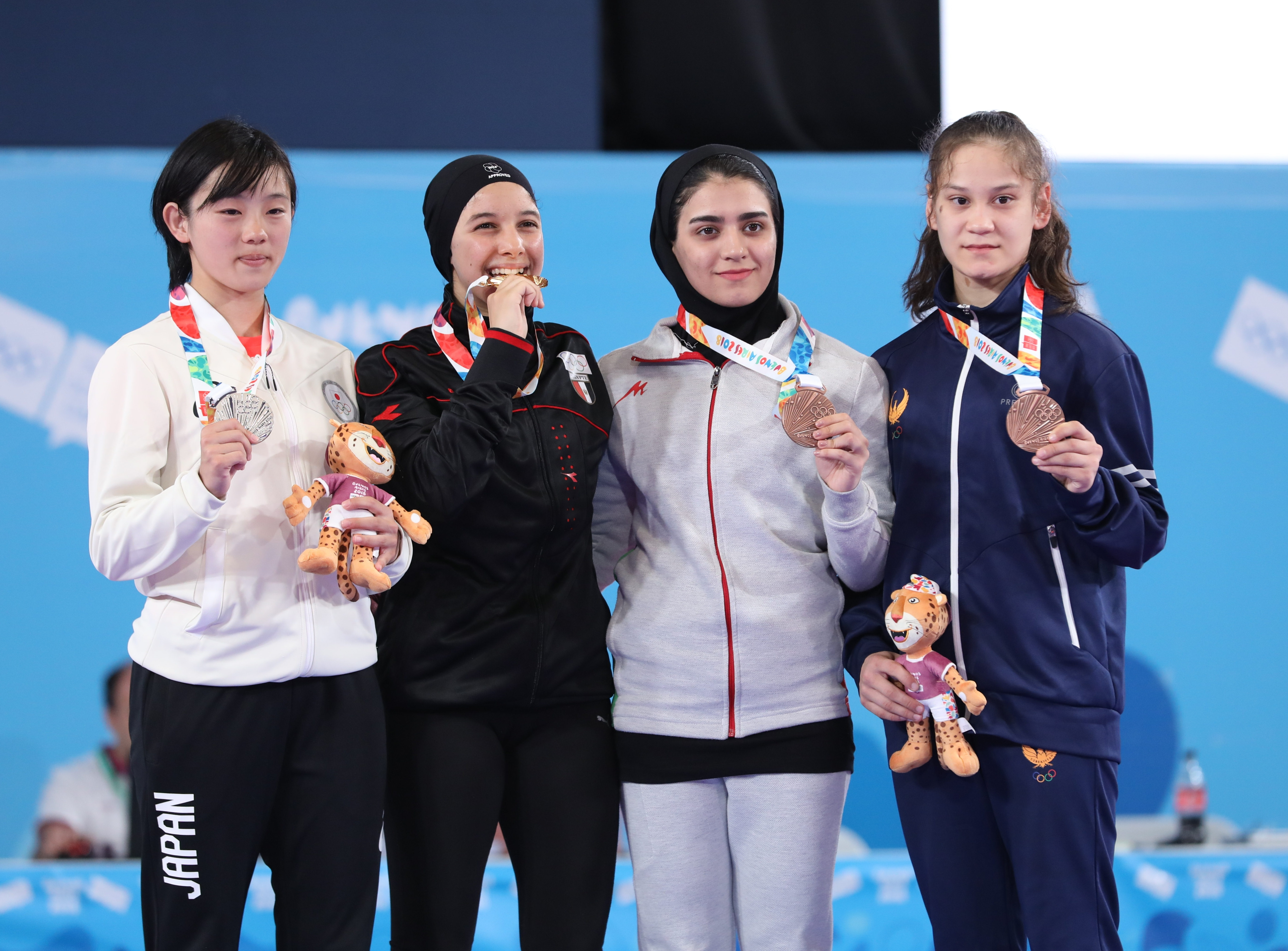
Girls' 53 kg victory ceremony

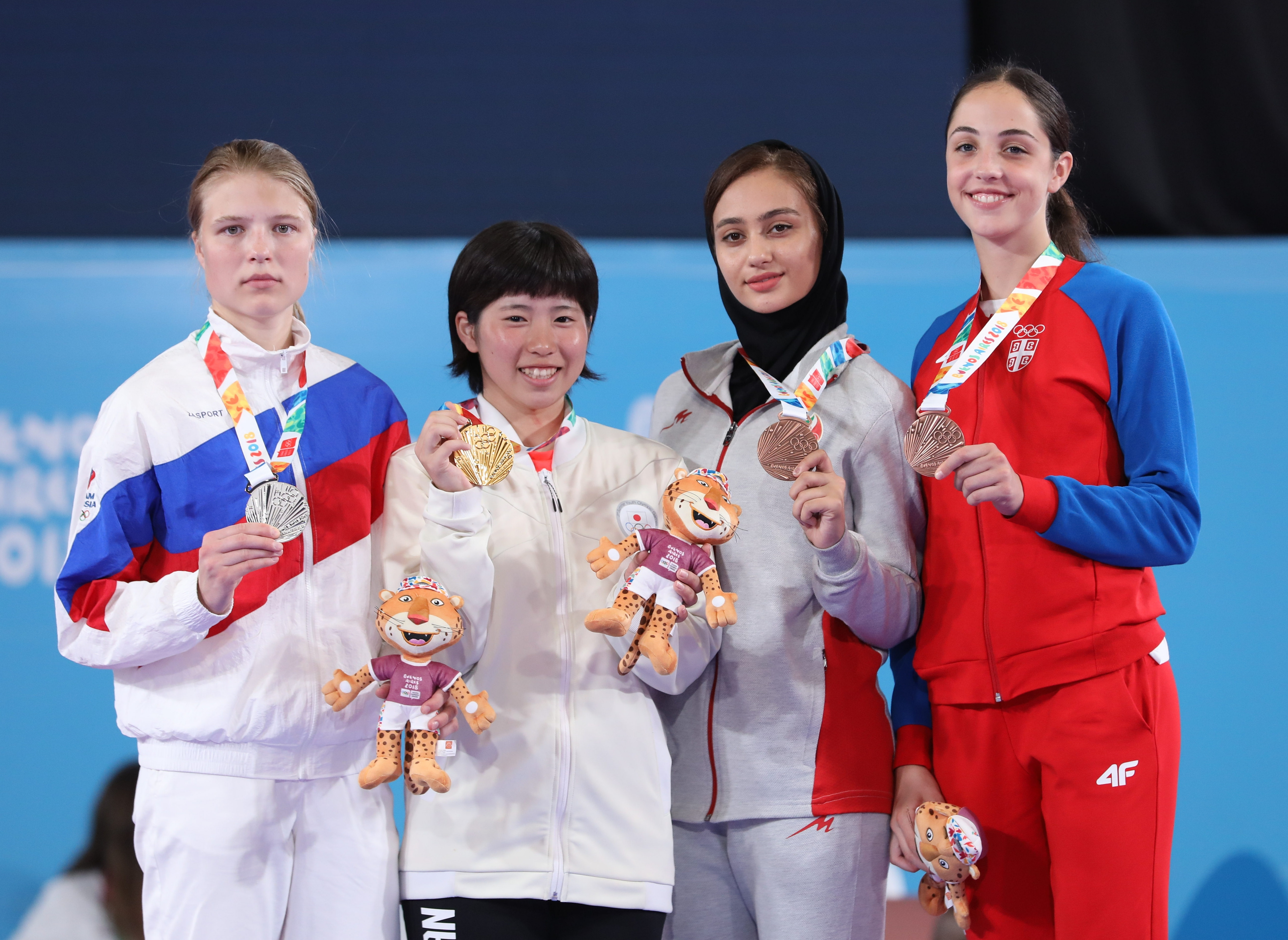
Girls' 59 kg victory ceremony

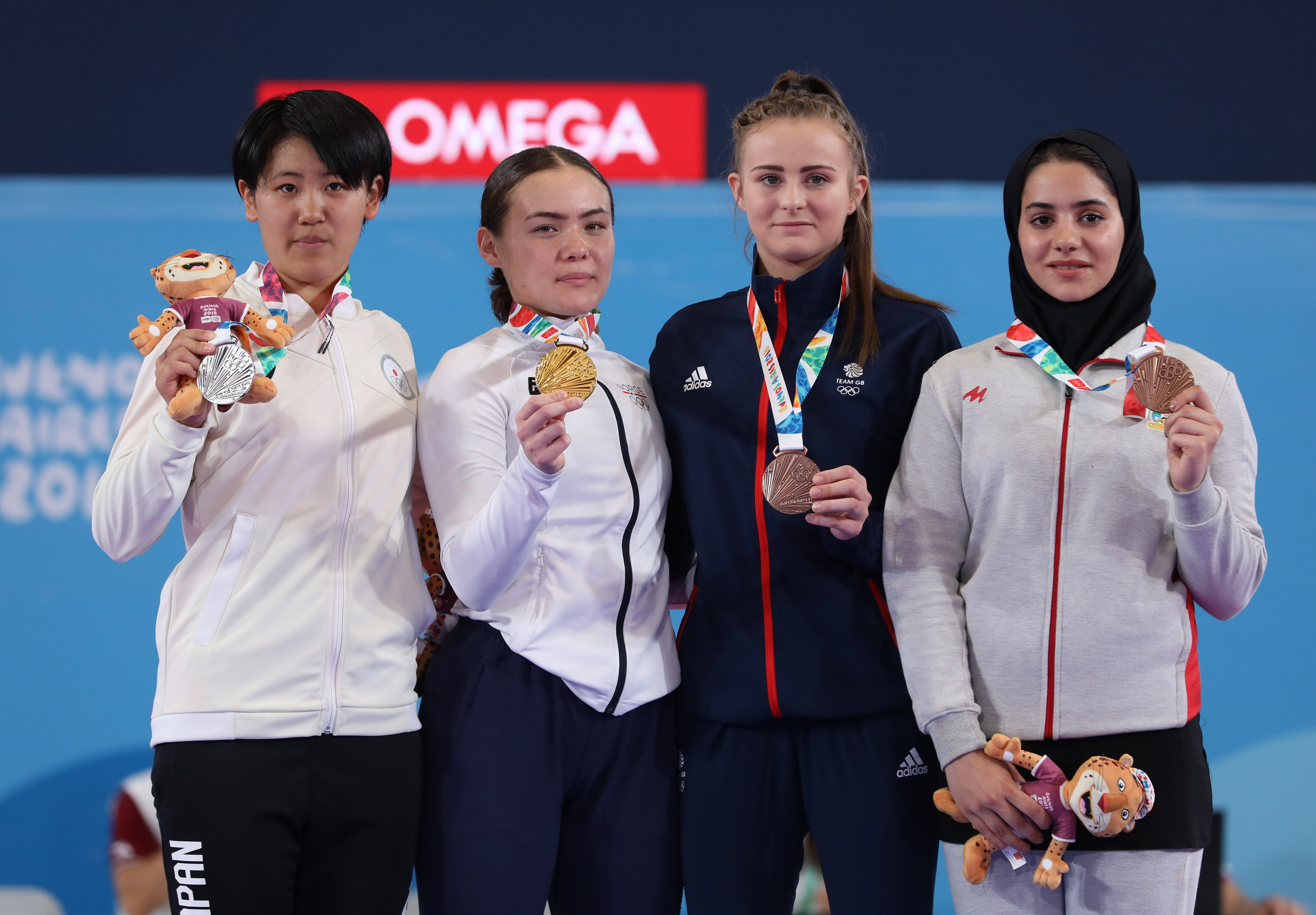
Girls' +59 kg victory ceremony
