= Iran at the 2018 Summer Youth Olympics =

- IOC code: IRI
- NOC: National Olympic Committee of the Islamic Republic of Iran

in Buenos Aires 6 – 18 October 2018
- Competitors: 49 in 18 sports
- Flag bearer: Mohammad Nosrati
- Medals Ranked 7th: Gold 7 Silver 3 Bronze 4 Total 14

Summer Youth Olympics appearances (overview)
- 2010; 2014; 2018; 2026

Iran participated at the 2018 Summer Youth Olympics in Buenos Aires, Argentina.

== Competitors ==
Sport	Boys	Girls	Total
3x3 basketball		4	4
Archery	1	1	2
Athletics	3		3
Boxing	1		1
Canoeing	1	1	2
Equestrian	1		1
Fencing	1		1
Futsal	10		10
Gymnastics	1		1
Judo	1	1	2
Karate	2	3	5
Rowing		1	1
Shooting	2		2
Swimming	1		1
Table tennis	1		1
Taekwondo	3	3	6
Weightlifting	2		2
Wrestling	4		4
Total	35	14	49

== Medal summary ==
Medal	Name	Sport	Event
Gold	Navid Mohammadi	Karate	Men's +68 kg
Gold	Yalda Valinejad	Taekwondo	Women's 63 kg
Gold	Ali Eshkevarian	Taekwondo	Men's 73 kg
Gold	Mohammad Ali Khosravi	Taekwondo	Men's +73 kg
Gold	Alireza Yousefi	Weightlifting	Men's +85 kg
Gold	Amir Reza Dehbozorgi	Wrestling	Men's Greco-Roman 45 kg
Gold	Mohammad Nosrati	Wrestling	Men's Greco-Roman 92 kg
Silver	Kimia Hemmati	Taekwondo	Women's +63 kg
Silver	Mohammad Karimi	Wrestling	Men's Freestyle 65 kg
Silver	Amir Hossein Zare	Wrestling	Men's Freestyle 110 kg
Bronze	Reza Bohloulzadeh	Gymnastics	Men's Pommel horse
Bronze	Fatemeh Khonakdar	Karate	Women's 53 kg
Bronze	Mobina Heidari	Karate	Women's 59 kg
Bronze	Negin Altooni	Karate	Women's +59 kg

Medals by sport
Sport	1st place, gold medalist(s)	2nd place, silver medalist(s)	3rd place, bronze medalist(s)	Total
Gymnastics	0	0	1	1
Karate	1	0	3	4
Taekwondo	3	1	0	4
Weightlifting	1	0	0	1
Wrestling	2	2	0	4
Total	7	3	4	14

== Results by event ==
=== 3x3 basketball ===
Team

Athlete	Event	Preliminary round					Quarterfinal	Semifinal	Final	Rank
Athlete	Event	Round 1	Round 2	Round 3	Round 4	Rank	Quarterfinal	Semifinal	Final	Rank
Fatemeh Aghazadegan; Fatemeh Bidar; Negin Rasoulipour; Ayda Golmohammadi	Girls	Hungary; L 0–22	Romania; L 14–18	Germany; L 9–19	China; L 13–15	5	Did not advance			19

Individual contests

Athlete	Event	Qualification		Final	
Athlete	Event	Score (Time)	Rank	Score (Time)	Rank
Fatemeh Aghazadegan	Girls' shoot-out	4 (29.4)	15	Did not advance	
Fatemeh Bidar	Girls' shoot-out	3 (30.0)	26	Did not advance	

=== Aquatics ===
==== Swimming ====
Athlete	Event	Heats		Semifinals		Final	
Athlete	Event	Time	Rank	Time	Rank	Time	Rank
Alireza Yavari	Boys' 100 m freestyle	52.08	28	Did not advance			

=== Archery ===
Boys' recurve

Athlete	Event	Ranking round		1/16 elimination	1/8 elimination	Quarterfinal	Semifinal	Final	Rank
Athlete	Event	Score	Seed	1/16 elimination	1/8 elimination	Quarterfinal	Semifinal	Final	Rank
Reza Shabani	Individual	653	23	Õun (EST); W 6–2; 27–25, 26–28, 27–25, 30–26	Cheremiskin (RUS); W 6–4; 28–28, 29–28, 27–28, 29–27, 27–27	Cowles (USA); L 0–6; 26–29, 28–29, 27–28	Did not advance		8

Girls' recurve

Athlete	Event	Ranking round		1/16 elimination	1/8 elimination	Quarterfinal	Semifinal	Final	Rank
Athlete	Event	Score	Seed	1/16 elimination	1/8 elimination	Quarterfinal	Semifinal	Final	Rank
Sogand Rahmani	Individual	631	20	Naumova (UKR); L 2–6; 25–28, 26–23, 24–26, 23–25	Did not advance				17

Mixed recurve

Athlete	Event	Ranking round		1/16 elimination	1/8 elimination	Quarterfinal	Semifinal	Final	Rank
Athlete	Event	Score	Seed	1/16 elimination	1/8 elimination	Quarterfinal	Semifinal	Final	Rank
Shabani (IRI); Tromans-Ansell (GBR)	Team	1305	4	Roux (RSA); Kumari (IND); W 5–1; 39–33, 35–35, 37–32	Õun (EST); Tagle (PHI); L 3–6; 36–36, 34–34, 36–36, 33–36	Did not advance			9
Cadena (COL); Rahmani (IRI)	Team	1298	21	Ak (TUR); Pyae (MYA); L 0–6; 25–35, 35–37, 36–37	Did not advance				17

=== Boxing ===
Athlete	Event	Quarterfinal		Semifinal	Final	Rank
Athlete	Event	1st chance	2nd chance	Semifinal	Final	Rank
Sajjad Mousavi	Boys' 81 kg	Merjanov (UZB); L 1–4	Kolesnikov (RUS); L KO	Did not advance	5th place match Morales (PUR); L WO	6

=== Canoeing ===
Athlete	Event	Heats		Repechage		Round of 16	Quarterfinal	Semifinal	Final	Rank
Athlete	Event	Time	Rank	Time	Rank	Round of 16	Quarterfinal	Semifinal	Final	Rank
Sobhan Beiranvand	Boys' slalom C1	1:27.60	7	1:27.62	4 Q	—N/a	Becerra (ESP); L 1:25.72–1:23.90	Did not advance		7
Sobhan Beiranvand	Boys' sprint C1	2:01.21	12	2:00.11	6	—N/a	Did not advance			10
Nirvana Asadbeigi	Girls' slalom C1	1:28.57	2 Q	Bye		Gönczöl (HUN); W 1:29.00–1:36.57	Cullwick (NZL); W 1:29.87–1:37.84	Delassus (FRA); L 1:28.53–1:27.54	3rd place match Luknárová (SVK); L 1:29.56–1:25.75	4
Nirvana Asadbeigi	Girls' sprint C1	2:27.28	8 Q	Bye		Malapane (MOZ); W 2:26.89–3:53.99	Nurlanova (KAZ); L 2:28.81–2:20.95	Did not advance		7

=== Equestrian ===
Iran qualified a rider based on its ranking in the FEI World Jumping Challenge Rankings.

- Individual Jumping – 1 athlete

Summary

Athlete	Horse	Event	Qualification					Final					Total	
Athlete	Horse	Event	Round 1		Round 2			Round A		Round B			Total	
Athlete	Horse	Event	Penalties	Rank	Penalties	Total	Rank	Penalties	Rank	Penalties	Total	Rank	Penalties	Rank
Arshia Najafinia	La Trinidad	Individual	—N/a					20	27	12	12	27	32	27
Mix Australasia; Almarzooqi (UAE); Najafinia (IRI); Burnett-Grant (NZL); Alqashouti (QAT); Sinderberry (AUS)	La Corina Lala; La Trinidad; Milagro Maximo; Pietro; Zambo	Team	24	=1 Q	36	60	5	—N/a					60	4

=== Fencing ===
Athlete	Event	Pool round		Round of 16	Quarterfinal	Semifinal	Final	Rank
Athlete	Event	Results	Rank	Round of 16	Quarterfinal	Semifinal	Final	Rank
Amir Hossein Shaker	Boys' sabre	Mahbas (IRQ) W 5–3; Heathcock (GER) L 4–5; Rabb (HUN) W 5–0; Hyun (KOR) L 2–5; Coly (SEN) W 5–0; Vidovszky (USA) W 5–4; El-Araby (EGY) L 2–5	7 Q	Kato (JPN); L 9–15	Did not advance			9

=== Futsal ===
Summary

Team	Event	Group stage					Semifinal	Final / BM	
Team	Event	Opposition Score	Opposition Score	Opposition Score	Opposition Score	Rank	Opposition Score	Opposition Score	Rank
Iran U18	Boys' tournament	Solomon Islands; W 9–2	Brazil; L 0–4	Russia; L 1–2	Costa Rica; W 9–3	3	Did not advance		

Team roster

Group stage

Pos	Team	Pld	W	D	L	GF	GA	GD	Pts	Qualification
1	Brazil	4	4	0	0	25	4	+21	12	Semi-finals
2	Russia	4	3	0	1	19	12	+7	9	Semi-finals
3	Iran	4	2	0	2	19	11	+8	6	
4	Costa Rica	4	1	0	3	17	27	−10	3	
5	Solomon Islands	4	0	0	4	13	39	−26	0	

Source: FIFA IOC
7 October 2018
20:00

Iran	9–2	Solomon Islands
Alizadeh 6', 12', 22'; Ghanbari 11'; Tamizi 18', 37'; Esmaeili 35', 36'; Sarbaz 38'	Report (FIFA); Report (IOC)	Lea'i 23', 39'

CeNARD
Attendance: 0
Referee: José Barrera (El Salvador)

10 October 2018
18:00

Brazil	4–0	Iran
Guilhermão 1', 16'; Neguinho 29'; Moura 38'	Report (FIFA); Report (IOC) Category:Futsal at the 2018 Summer Youth Olympics – Boys First Round – BRA-IRI on Wikimedia Commons

CeNARD
Attendance: 788
Referee: Miguel Oliveira (Portugal)

12 October 2018
18:00

Iran	1–2	Russia
Alizadeh 31'	Report (FIFA); Report (IOC)	Karpiuk 32' (pen.); Fedorov 38'

Tecnópolis
Attendance: 6,100
Referee: Hiroyuki Kobayashi (Japan)

13 October 2018
18:00

Costa Rica	3–9	Iran
Corrales 1', 3'; Mora 6'	Report (FIFA); Report (IOC)	Tamizi 5'; Adelipour 14'; Alizadeh 15'; Mehdikhani 16'; Aghapour 17' (pen.), 35'; Esmaeili 19' (pen.), 21'; Ghanbari 27' (pen.)

Tecnópolis
Attendance: 6,410
Referee: Ovidiu Curta (Romania)

=== Gymnastics ===
==== Artistic ====
Iran qualified one gymnasts based on its performance at the 2018 Asian Junior Championship.

- Boys' artistic individual all-around – 1 quota

Boys

Athlete	Event	Apparatus						Total	Rank
Athlete	Event	F	PH	R	V	PB	HB	Total	Rank
Reza Bohloulzade Hajlari	Qualification	12.766	13.166	11.300	12.333	12.800	11.766	74.131	18
Reza Bohloulzade Hajlari	All-around	12.566	13.133	11.866	12.766	12.133	12.233	74.397	13
Reza Bohloulzade Hajlari	Pommel horse	—N/a	13.241	—N/a				13.241	3rd place, bronze medalist(s)

==== Multidiscipline ====
Team	Athlete	Acrobatic	Artistic	Rhythmic	Trampoline	Total points	Rank
Team Anna Bessonova (Gray)	Sophia Imrie-Gale (GBR); Clyde Gembickas (GBR)	15	—N/a			381	4
Team Anna Bessonova (Gray)	Ward Claeys (BEL)	—N/a	99	—N/a		381	4
Team Anna Bessonova (Gray)	Reza Bohloulzade Hajlari (IRI)	—N/a	65	—N/a		381	4
Team Anna Bessonova (Gray)	Ayan Moldagaliyev (KAZ)	—N/a	36	—N/a		381	4
Team Anna Bessonova (Gray)	Eglė Stalinkevičiūtė (LTU)	—N/a	42	—N/a		381	4
Team Anna Bessonova (Gray)	Ada Hautala (FIN)	—N/a	10	—N/a		381	4
Team Anna Bessonova (Gray)	Giorgia Villa (ITA)	—N/a	11	—N/a		381	4
Team Anna Bessonova (Gray)	Celia Joseph Noël (FRA)	—N/a		40	—N/a	381	4
Team Anna Bessonova (Gray)	Celeste D'arcangelo (ARG)	—N/a		13	—N/a	381	4
Team Anna Bessonova (Gray)	Tatyana Volozhanina (BUL)	—N/a		26	—N/a	381	4
Team Anna Bessonova (Gray)	Jérémy Chartier (CAN)	—N/a			15	381	4
Team Anna Bessonova (Gray)	Vera Beliankina (RUS)	—N/a			9	381	4

=== Judo ===
Athlete	Event	Round of 16	Quarterfinal	Semifinal	Repechage	Final	Rank
Abolfazl Shojaei	Boys' 100 kg	Nihozeko (BDI); W 10–00	Saduakas (KAZ); L 00–11	Did not advance	Repechage; Bagrin (MDA); L 01–10	Did not advance	7
Maral Mardani	Girls' 78 kg	Ramírez (DOM); L WO	Did not advance	Repechage; Lobnik (SLO); L WO	Did not advance		9

=== Karate ===
Athlete	Event	Group round				Semifinal	Final	Rank
Athlete	Event	Round 1	Round 2	Round 3	Rank	Semifinal	Final	Rank
Alireza Faraji	Boys' 61 kg	Edari (MAR); L 0–4	Yamaoka (JPN); L 0–5	de la Roca (GUA); L 0–1	4	Did not advance		7
Navid Mohammadi	Boys' +68 kg	McCarthy (IRL); W 5–2	Sakiyama (JPN); L 0–2	Kósa (SVK); W 1–0	2 Q	Bulut (TUR); W 3–3	Ech-Chaabi (MAR); W 5–0	1st place, gold medalist(s)
Fatemeh Khonakdar	Girls' 53 kg	Barros (POR); W 6–0	Okazaki (THA); W 2–0	Tahata (JPN); L 0–1	2 Q	El-Gewily (EGY); L 0–5	Did not advance	3rd place, bronze medalist(s)
Mobina Heidari	Girls' 59 kg	Hope (GBR); W 2–0	Oukhattou (FRA); W 1–0	Chernysheva (RUS); L HAN (1–0)	2 Q	Sakaji (JPN); L 0–0	Did not advance	3rd place, bronze medalist(s)
Negin Altouni	Girls' +59 kg	Fonseca (PUR); D 0–0	Sawashima (JPN); W 5–1	Lyck (DEN); L 0–1	2 Q	Sælid (NOR); L 0–4	Did not advance	3rd place, bronze medalist(s)

=== Rowing ===
Athlete	Event	Time trial		Qualification rounds				Quarterfinal		Semifinal		Final		Rank
Athlete	Event	Time	Rank	Round 2	Round 3	Total	Rank	Time	Rank	Time	Rank	Time	Rank	Rank
Hanieh Bidad	Girls' single sculls	Relegated	24	2:00.83 (3 pts)	1:59.70 (3 pts)	6 pts	17 QE/F	Did not advance		Semifinal E/F; 1:52.43	1 QE	Final E 1:54.76	3	19

=== Shooting ===
Individual

Athlete	Event	Qualification		Final	
Athlete	Event	Score	Rank	Score	Rank
Amirsiyavash Zolfagharian	Boys' 10 m air rifle	628.5	1 Q	119.9	8
Erfan Salavati	Boys' 10 m air pistol	580	2 Q	174.7	5

Team

Athletes	Event	Qualification		Round of 16	Quarterfinals	Semifinals	Final / BM	
Athletes	Event	Points	Rank	Opposition Result	Opposition Result	Opposition Result	Opposition Result	Rank
Mak Amanda Sao Keng (SGP); Erfan Salavati (IRI)	Mixed 10 metre air pistol	755-16	1	Ibarra Miranda (MEX); Honta (UKR); L 5-10	Did not advance			
Alliana Volkart (ARG); Amirsiyavash Zolfagharian (IRI)	Mixed Team 10m Air Rifle	823.2	9 Q	Bober (POL); Dević (MNE); W 10 - 9	Erdenechuluun (MGL); Pekler (HUN); L 9 - 10	Did not advance		6

=== Table tennis ===
Athlete	Event	Preliminary round				Round of 16	Quarterfinal	Semifinal	Final	Rank
Athlete	Event	Round 1	Round 2	Round 3	Rank	Round of 16	Quarterfinal	Semifinal	Final	Rank
Amin Ahmadian	Boys' singles	Choong (MAS); W 4–2 (−8, 8, 6, 8, −6, 13)	Thakkar (IND); W 4–1 (9, −10, 6, 7, 8)	Stankevičius (LTU); W 4–1 (−4, 5, 12, 5, 7)	1 Q	Pang (SGP); L 0–4 (−10, −10, −9, −2)	Did not advance			9

=== Taekwondo ===
Athlete	Event	Round of 16	Quarterfinal	Semifinal	Final	Rank
Hamed Asghari	Boys' 63 kg	Bye	Aghayev (AZE); L 8–9	Did not advance		5
Ali Eshkevarian	Boys' 73 kg	Bye	Qiu (TPE); W 19–17	Padilla (ECU); W 29–5	Achab (BEL); W 17–16	1st place, gold medalist(s)
Mohammad Ali Khosravi	Boys' +73 kg	—N/a	Auguštin (SLO); W 16–11	Abdulrahimzai (AFG); W 19–16	Lee (TPE); W 2–1	1st place, gold medalist(s)
Mahla Momenzadeh	Girls' 44 kg	Aden (DJI); W RSC (32–0)	Kang (KOR); L 14–15	Did not advance		5
Yalda Valinejad	Girls' 63 kg	Bye	Hamaidi (JOR); W 12–2	Soltero (MEX); W 26–22	Božanić (SRB); W 23–17	1st place, gold medalist(s)
Kimia Hemmati	Girls' +63 kg	—N/a	Gannaway (GBR); W 19–8	Adebaio (RUS); W 21–19	Aboufaras (MAR); L 16–18	2nd place, silver medalist(s)

=== Weightlifting ===
Athlete	Event	Snatch		Clean & Jerk		Total	
Athlete	Event	Result	Rank	Result	Rank	Result	Rank
Amir Reza Askaridoun	Boys' 85 kg	133	3	165	4	298	4
Alireza Yousefi	Boys' +85 kg	162	2	218	1	380	1st place, gold medalist(s)

=== Wrestling ===
Athlete	Event	Group round			Final	Rank
Athlete	Event	Round 1	Round 2	Rank	Final	Rank
Mohammad Karimi	Boys' freestyle 65 kg	Ismail (EGY); W 6–5	Manville (USA); W 10–0	1 Q	Bayramov (AZE); L 1–6	2nd place, silver medalist(s)
Amir Hossein Zare	Boys' freestyle 110 kg	Barns (AUS); W 11–0	Khalil (EGY); W 11–0	1 Q	Kozyrev (RUS); L 5–6	2nd place, silver medalist(s)
Amir Reza Dehbozorgi	Boys' Greco-Roman 45 kg	Nazaryan (BUL); W 3–1	Shaaban (EGY); W 10–0	1 Q	Peralta (ECU); W 8–0	1st place, gold medalist(s)
Mohammad Nosrati	Boys' Greco-Roman 92 kg	Queiroz (BRA); W 5–0	Evloev (RUS); W 5–3	1 Q	Ayaydın (TUR); W 3–1	1st place, gold medalist(s)
