= Karate at the 2018 Summer Youth Olympics – Boys' 61 kg =

Karate competition

Boys' Kumite 61 kg at the III Summer Youth Olympic Games
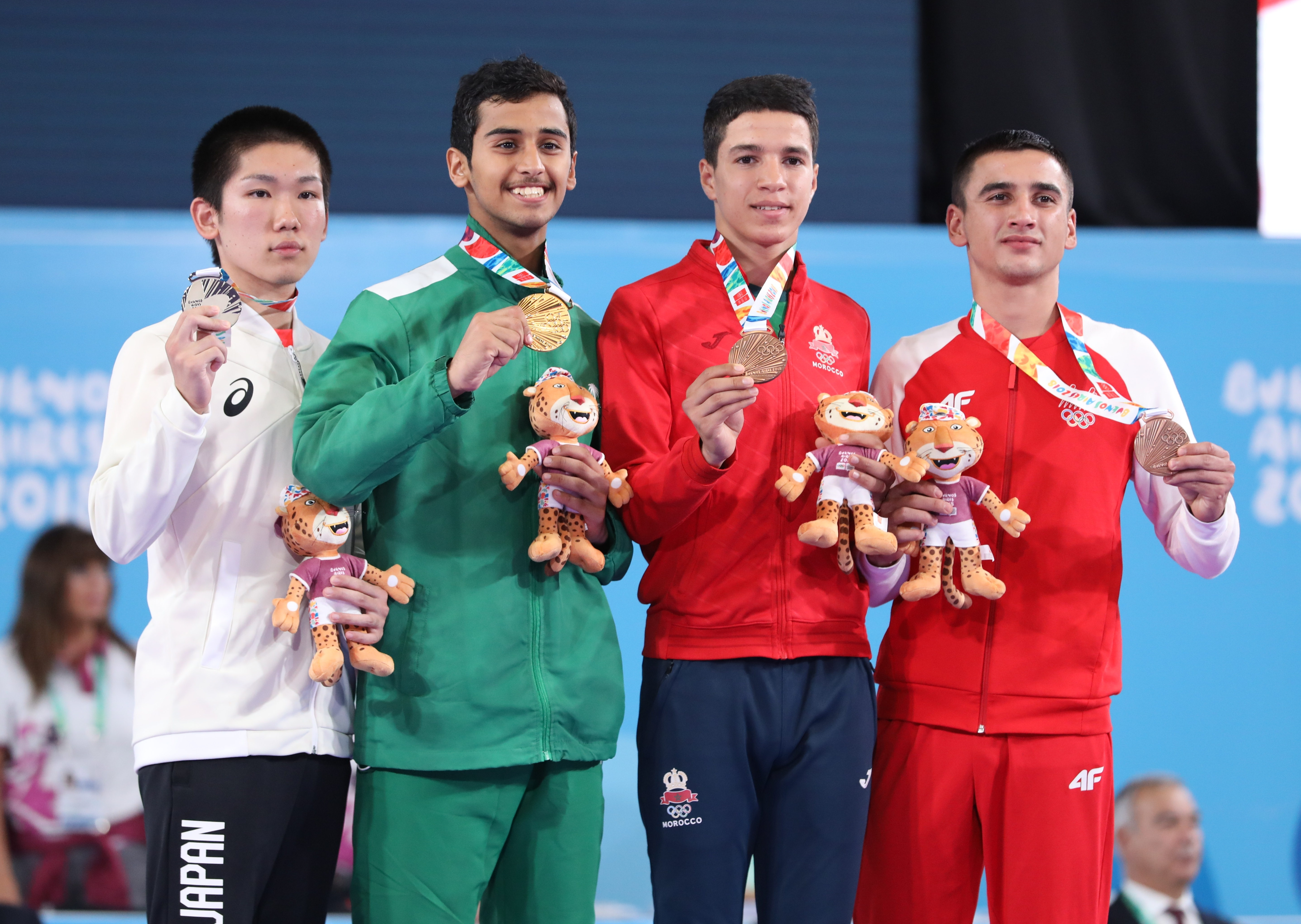
- Venue: Europa Pavilion
- Date: 17 October
- Competitors: 8 from 8 nations

Medalists
1st place, gold medalist(s)		Mohammed Al-Assiri	Saudi Arabia
2nd place, silver medalist(s)		Masaki Yamaoka	Japan
3rd place, bronze medalist(s)		Oussama Edari	Morocco
3rd place, bronze medalist(s)		Fahik Veseli	Macedonia

The boys' kumite –61 kg competition at the 2018 Summer Youth Olympics was held on 17 October at the Europa Pavilion in Buenos Aires, Argentina.

== Schedule ==
All times are local (UTC-3).

Date	Time	Round
Wednesday, 17 October	11:05	Elimination round
Wednesday, 17 October	15:15	Semifinals
Wednesday, 17 October	15:49	Final

== Results ==
=== Elimination round ===
==== Pool A ====
Rank	Athlete	B	W	D	L	Pts	Score
1	Mohammed Al-Assiri (KSA)	3	2	1	0	5	6–0
2	Fahik Veseli (MKD)	3	2	0	1	4	7–4
3	Abdallah Hammad (JOR)	3	1	1	1	3	1–1
4	Rodrigo Tello (ARG)	3	0	1	2	1	0–9

	Score	
Fahik Veseli (MKD)	0–4	Mohammed Al-Assiri (KSA)
Rodrigo Tello (ARG)	0–1	Abdallah Hammad (JOR)
Rodrigo Tello (ARG)	0–2	Mohammed Al-Assiri (KSA)
Fahik Veseli (MKD)	1–0	Abdallah Hammad (JOR)
Abdallah Hammad (JOR)	0–0	Mohammed Al-Assiri (KSA)
Fahik Veseli (MKD)	6–0	Rodrigo Tello (ARG)

==== Pool B ====
Rank	Athlete	B	W	D	L	Pts	Score
1	Masaki Yamaoka (JPN)	3	2	1	0	5	9–0
2	Oussama Edari (MAR)	3	2	1	0	5	8–1
3	Pedropablo de la Roca (GUA)	3	1	0	2	2	2–8
4	Alireza Faraji (IRI)	3	0	0	3	0	0–10

	Score	
Masaki Yamaoka (JPN)	4–0	Pedropablo de la Roca (GUA)
Oussama Edari (MAR)	4–0	Alireza Faraji (IRI)
Oussama Edari (MAR)	4–1	Pedropablo de la Roca (GUA)
Masaki Yamaoka (JPN)	5–0	Alireza Faraji (IRI)
Alireza Faraji (IRI)	0–1	Pedropablo de la Roca (GUA)
Masaki Yamaoka (JPN)	0–0	Oussama Edari (MAR)

=== Semifinals ===
	Score	
Mohammed Al-Assiri (KSA)	2–0	Oussama Edari (MAR)
Masaki Yamaoka (JPN)	8–0	Fahik Veseli (MKD)

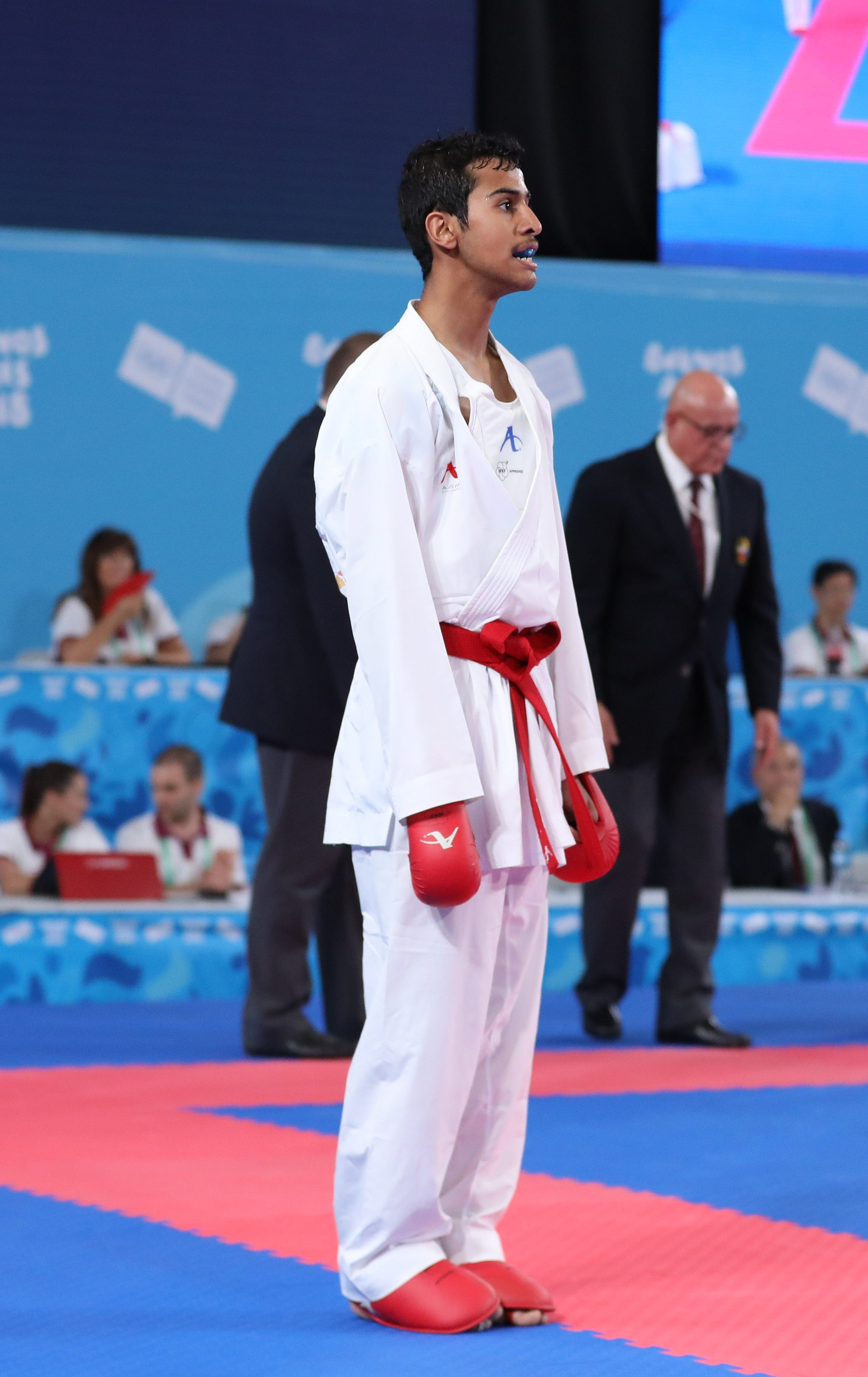
Mohammed Al-Assiri celebrating his victory in the semifinal

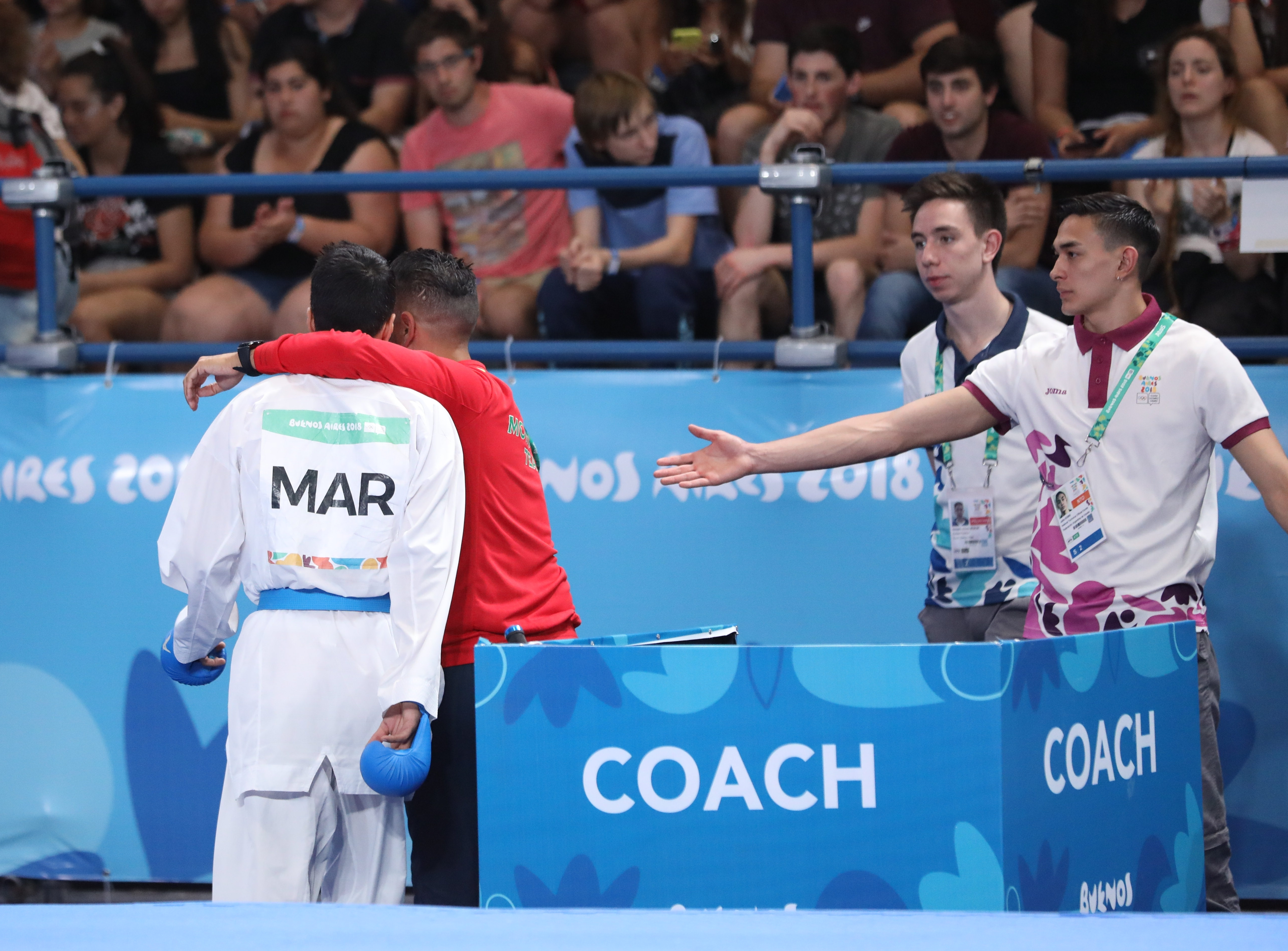
Oussama Edari is comforted by his trainer after losing the semifinal

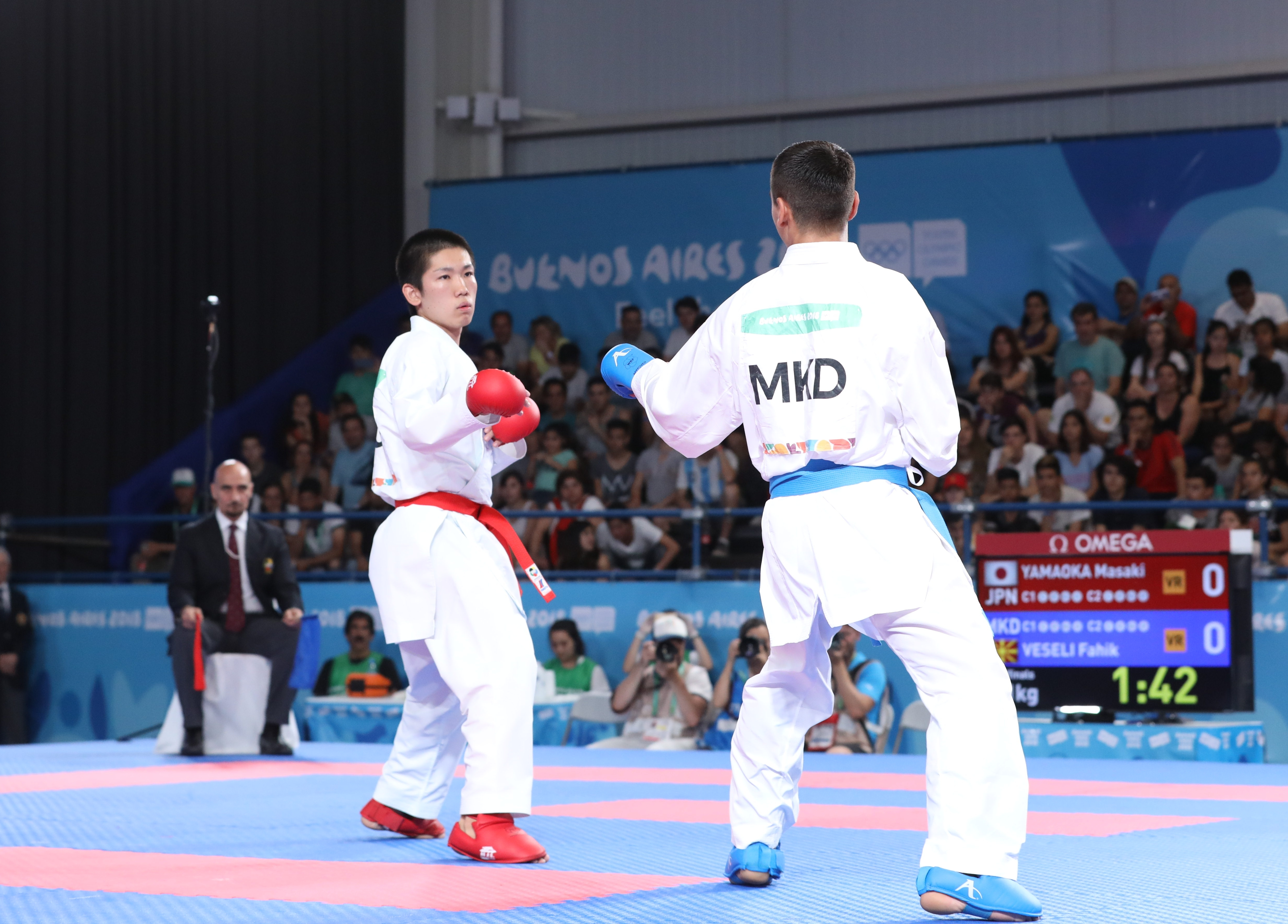
Masaki Yamaoka vs. Fahik Veseli in the semifinal

=== Final ===
	Score	
Mohammed Al-Assiri (KSA)	8–0	Masaki Yamaoka (JPN)

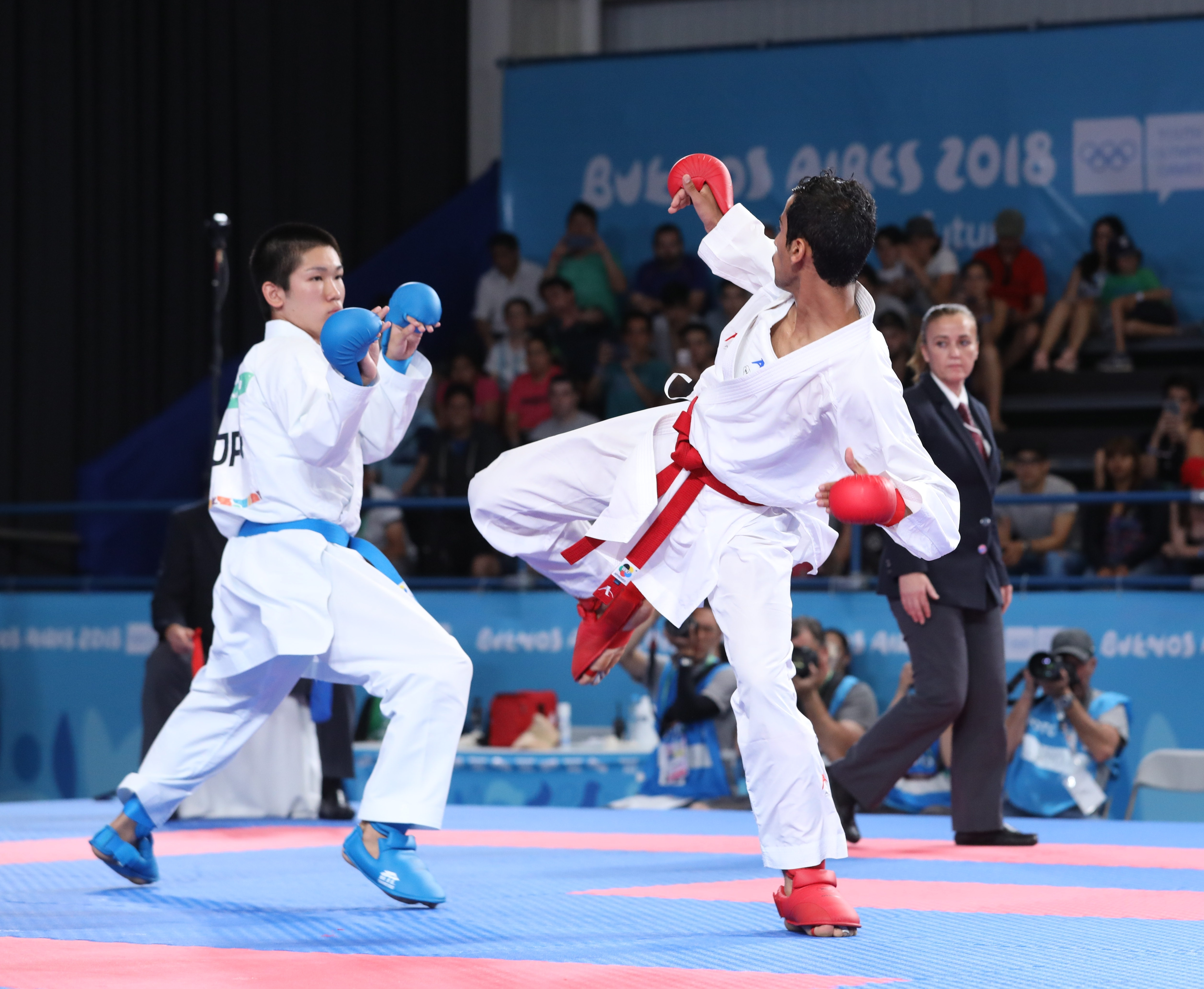
Masaki Yamaoka vs. Mohammed Al-Assiri

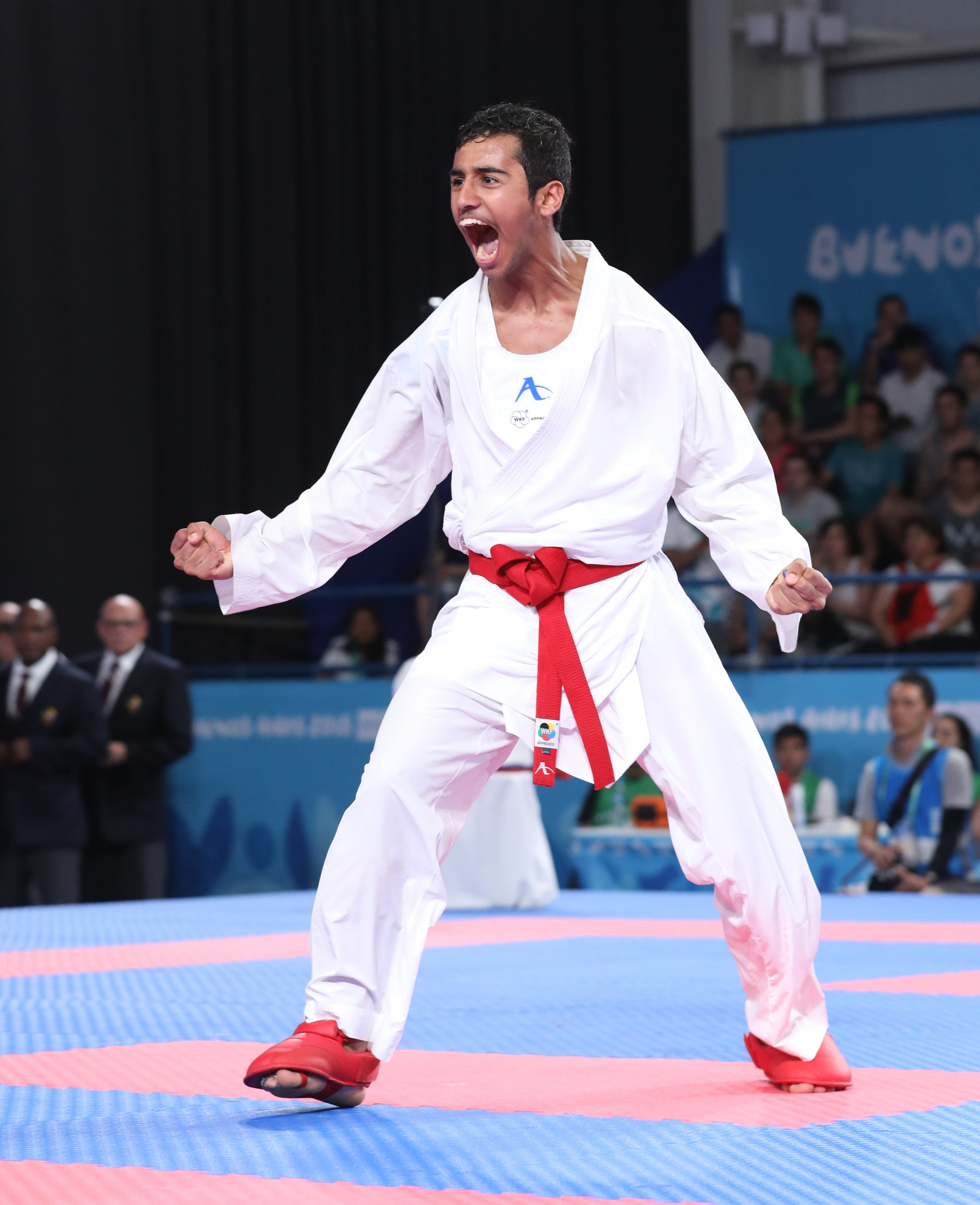
Mohammed Al-Assiri celebrating his victory

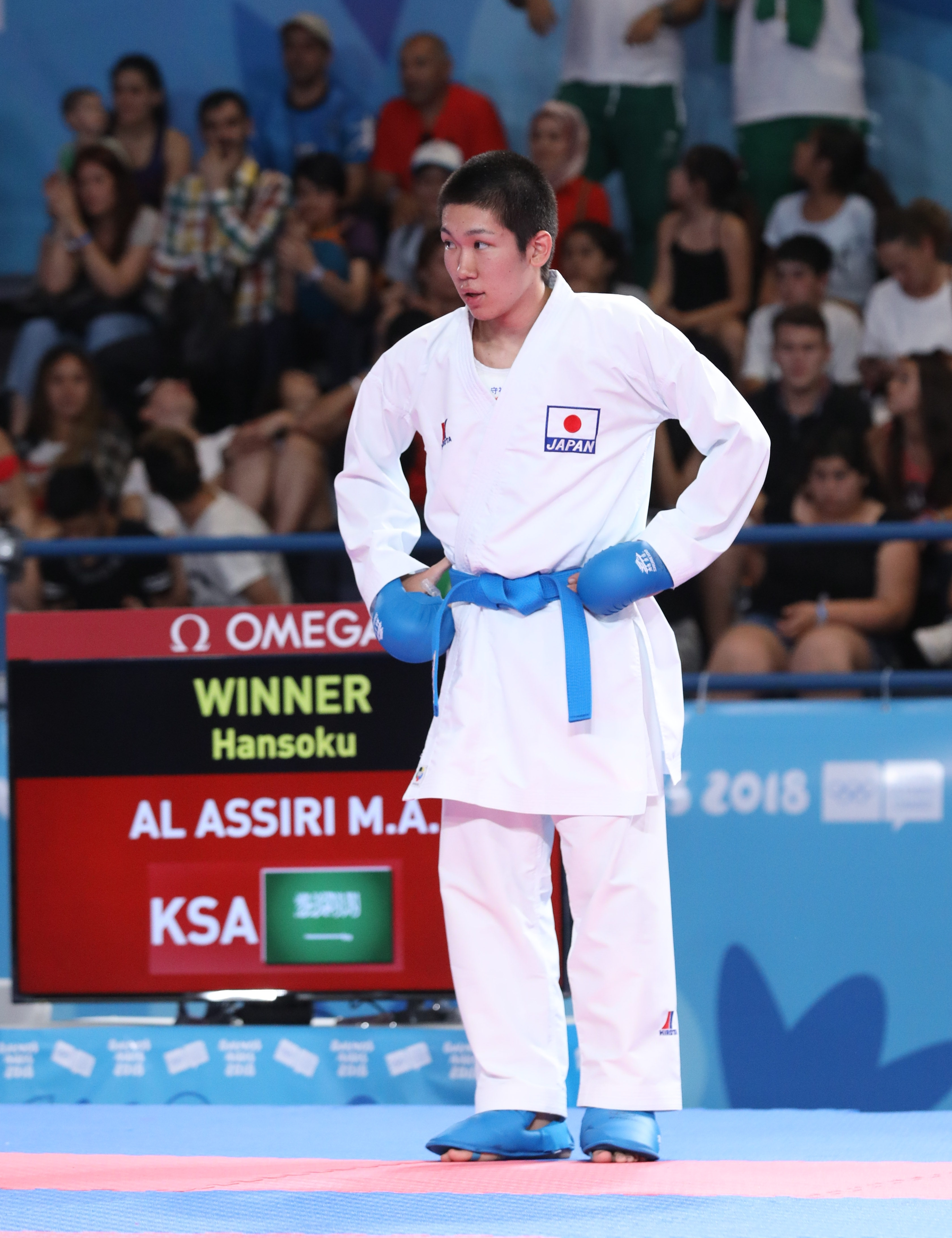
Masaki Yamaoka disappointed after losing the fight
