= Taekwondo at the 2018 Summer Youth Olympics – Girls' 55 kg =

Girls' 55 kg at the III Summer Youth Olympic Games
- Venue: Oceania Pavilion
- Date: 9 October
- Competitors: 10 from 10 nations

Medalists
1st place, gold medalist(s)		Kanthida Saengsin	Thailand
2nd place, silver medalist(s)		Safia Salih	Morocco
3rd place, bronze medalist(s)		Fani Tzeli	Greece
3rd place, bronze medalist(s)		Sandy Macedo	Brazil

The girls' 55 kg competition at the 2018 Summer Youth Olympics was held on 9 October at the Oceania Pavilion.

== Schedule ==
All times are in local time (UTC-3).

Date	Time	Round
Tuesday, 9 October 2018	14:00; 15:00; 19:00; 20:00	Round of 16; Quarterfinals; Semifinals; Final

== Bracket ==
Round of 16
9	Anamarija Georgievska (MKD)	DSQ
8	Vanessa Bettina Beckstein (GER)
7	Safia Salih (MAR)	31
10	Merveille Marindi (GAB)	1

Quarterfinals
1	Fani Tzeli (GRE)	19
8	Vanessa Bettina Beckstein (GER)	11
5	Yang Junli (CHN)	2
4	Kanthida Saengsin (THA)	3
3	Sandy Macedo (BRA)	23
6	Maya Magdy Badawy (EGY)	3
7	Safia Salih (MAR)	12
2	Rama Abo-Alrub (JOR)	8

Semifinals
1	Fani Tzeli (GRE)	3
4	Kanthida Saengsin (THA)	7
3	Sandy Macedo (BRA)	1
7	Safia Salih (MAR)	4

Gold medal match
4	Kanthida Saengsin (THA)	10
7	Safia Salih (MAR)	6
