= Macedonia at the 2018 Summer Youth Olympics =

- IOC code: MKD
- NOC: Macedonian Olympic Committee
- Website: http://www.mok.org.mk/

in Buenos Aires, Argentina 6 – 18 October 2018
- Competitors: 6 in 6 sports
- Flag bearer: Anamarija Georgievska
- Medals Ranked 83rd: Gold 0 Silver 0 Bronze 1 Total 1

Summer Youth Olympics appearances
- 2010; 2014; 2018

Macedonia participated at the 2018 Summer Youth Olympics held in Buenos Aires, Argentina from 6 October to 18 October 2018.

== Medalists ==
Medal	Name	Sport	Event	Date
Bronze	Fahik Vaseli	Karate	Boys' 61 kg	17 October

== Judo ==
Individual

Athlete	Event	Round of 16	Quarterfinals	Semifinals	Rep 1	Rep 2	Rep 3	Final / BM	Rank
Athlete	Event	Opposition Result	Opposition Result	Opposition Result	Opposition Result	Opposition Result	Opposition Result	Opposition Result	Rank
Hamza Jashari	Boys' 66 kg	Javier Peña (ESP); L 01-11	did not advance		Georgios Balarjishvili (CYP); W 01-00s2	Turpal Djoukaev (FIN); L 01-00s1	did not advance		

Team

Athletes	Event	Round of 16	Quarterfinals	Semifinals	Final	
Athletes	Event	Opposition Result	Opposition Result	Opposition Result	Opposition Result	Rank
Team Moscow; Augusta Ambourouet (GAB); Alessia Corrao (BEL); Temuujin Ganburged (MGL); Alexis Harrison Ayarza (PAN); Hamza Jashari (MKD); Paulina Țurcan (MDA); Zsombor Vég (HUN)	Mixed team	Team Singapore (MIX); W 4–3	Team London (MIX); L 3–4	did not advance		

== Karate ==
Macedonia qualified one athlete based on the rankings in the Buenos Aires 2018 Olympic Standings.

- Boys' -61 kg - Fahik Vaseli

Athlete	Event	Elimination round				Semifinals	Final	
Athlete	Event	Opposition Score	Opposition Score	Opposition Score	Rank	Opposition Score	Opposition Score	Rank
Fahik Vaseli	Boys' -61 kg	Hammad (JOR); W 1–0	Al Assiri (KSA); L 0–4	Tello (ARG); W 6–0	2	Masaki Yamaoka (JPN); L 0–8	did not advance	3rd place, bronze medalist(s)

== Taekwondo ==
Athlete	Event	Round of 16	Quarterfinals	Semifinals	Final	
Athlete	Event	Opposition Result	Opposition Result	Opposition Result	Opposition Result	Rank
Anamarija Georgievska	Girls' 55 kg	Vanessa Bettina Beckstein (GER); L DSQ	did not advance			

== Wrestling ==
Key:
- VFA – Victory by Fall
- VSU – Without any point scored by the opponent

Athlete	Event	Group stage			Final / RM	Rank
Athlete	Event	Opposition Score	Opposition Score	Rank	Opposition Score	Rank
Dragan Velinov	Boys' freestyle −110kg	Orozco (MEX); L 0 – 4 ^{VFA}	Kozyrev (RUS); L 0 – 4 ^{VFA}	3 Q	Barns (AUS); L 0 – 10 ^{VSU}	6
