= Taekwondo at the 2018 Summer Youth Olympics – Boys' 63 kg =

Boys' 63 kg at the III Summer Youth Olympic Games
- Venue: Oceania Pavilion
- Date: 9 October
- Competitors: 10 from 10 nations

Medalists
1st place, gold medalist(s)		Cho Won-hee	South Korea
2nd place, silver medalist(s)		Nareupong Thepsen	Thailand
3rd place, bronze medalist(s)		Javad Aghayev	Azerbaijan
3rd place, bronze medalist(s)		Gabriele Caulo	Italy

The boys' 63 kg competition at the 2018 Summer Youth Olympics was held on 9 October at the Oceania Pavilion.

== Schedule ==
All times are in local time (UTC-3).

Date	Time	Round
Tuesday, 9 October 2018	14:15; 15:15; 19:15; 20:15	Round of 16; Quarterfinals; Semifinals; Final

== Bracket ==
Round of 16
9	Stephen Chol Atem (SSD)	DSQ
8	Javad Aghayev (AZE)
7	Nareupong Thepsen (THA)	25
10	Casimir Djinodi (CHA)	20

Quarterfinals
1	Hamed Asghari Mahiabadi (IRI)	8
8	Javad Aghayev (AZE)	9
5	Cho Won-hee (KOR)	41
4	Ramiro Ravachino (ARG)	21
3	Gabriele Caulo (ITA)	18
6	Hasham Bandar bin Dookhy (KSA)	15
7	Nareupong Thepsen (THA)	28
2	Oleksandr Dziuba (UKR)	26

Semifinals
8	Javad Aghayev (AZE)	13
5	Cho Won-hee (KOR)	15
3	Gabriele Caulo (ITA)	14
7	Nareupong Thepsen (THA)	15

Gold medal match
5	Cho Won-hee (KOR)	21
7	Nareupong Thepsen (THA)	16
