= Wrestling at the 2018 Summer Youth Olympics – Boys' freestyle 110 kg =

Boys' freestyle 110kg at the III Summer Youth Olympic Games
- Venue: Asia Pavilion
- Date: 14 October 2018
- Competitors: 6 from 6 nations

Medalists
1st place, gold medalist(s)		Sergey Kozyrev; Russia
2nd place, silver medalist(s)		Amir Hossein Zare; Iran
3rd place, bronze medalist(s)		Ahmed Mahmoud Khalil; Egypt

The boys' freestyle 110 kg competition at the 2018 Summer Youth Olympics was held on 14 October, at the Asia Pavilion.

== Competition format ==
As there were less than six wrestlers in a weight category, the pool phase will be run as a single group competing in a round-robin format. Ranking within the groups is used to determine the pairings for the final phase.

== Schedule ==
All times are in local time (UTC-3).

Date	Time	Round
Sunday, 14 October 2018	10:20; 10:45; 11:10; 18:30	Round 1 Round 2 Round 3 Finals

== Results ==
Legend

- F — Won by fall

Group Stages

Qualified for the Gold-medal match
Qualified for the Bronze-medal match
Qualified for the 5th/6th Place Match

Group A

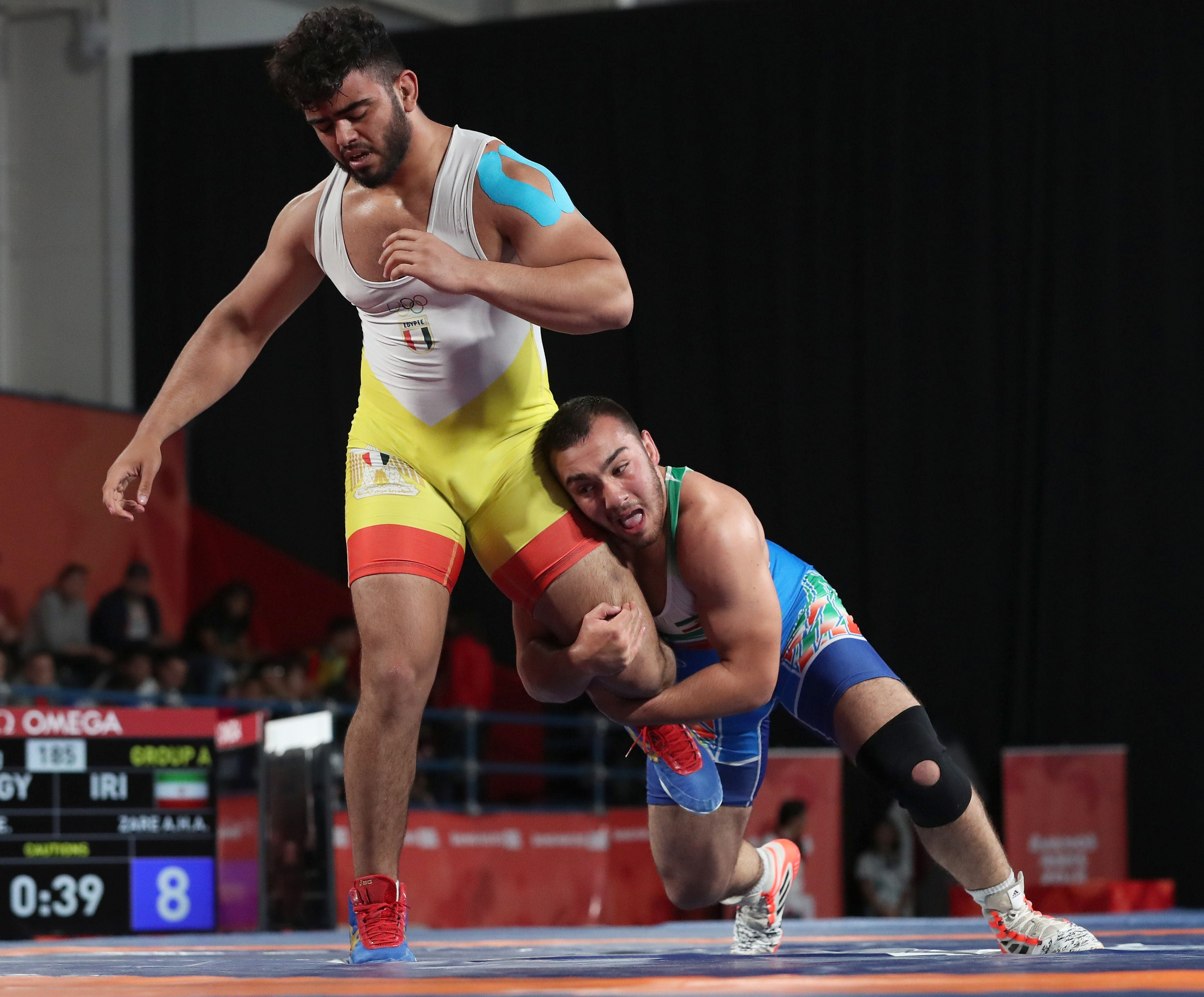
Ahmed Mahmoud Khalil vs. Amir Hossein Zare

Pos	Athlete	Pld	W	L	CP	TP	Qualification
1	Amir Hossein Zare (IRI)	2	2	0	8	22	Gold-medal match
2	Ahmed Mahmoud Khalil (EGY)	2	1	1	4	10	Bronze-medal match
3	Thomas Barns (AUS)	2	0	2	0	0	Classification 5th/6th place match

Source: UWW

	Score		CP
Thomas Barns (AUS)	0–11	Amir Hossein Zare (IRI)	0–4 VSU
Ahmed Mahmoud Khalil (EGY)	10–0	Thomas Barns (AUS)	4–0 VSU
Amir Hossein Zare (IRI)	11–0	Ahmed Mahmoud Khalil (EGY)	4–0 VSU

Group B

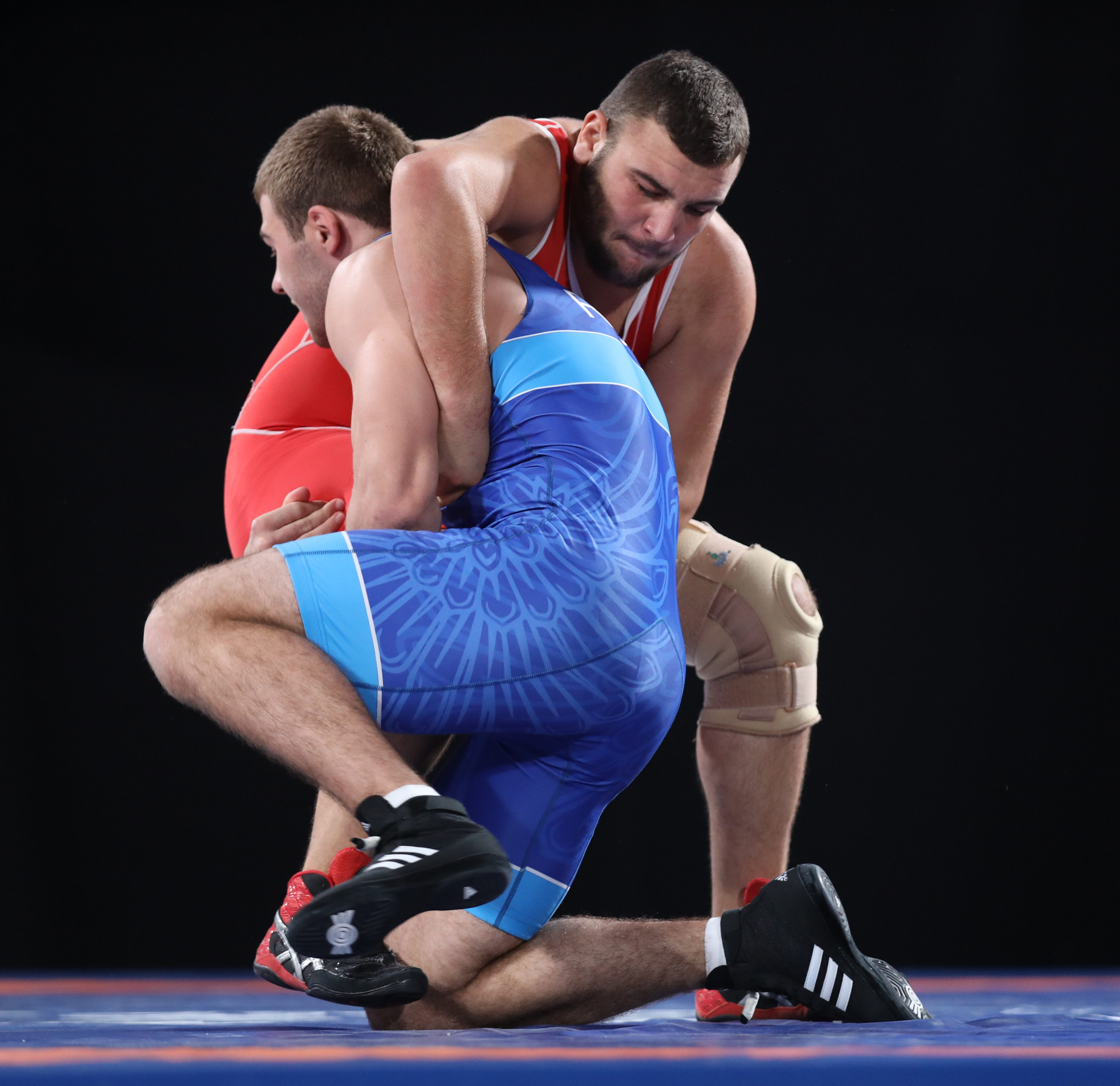
Dragan Velinov vs. Sergey Kozyrev

Pos	Athlete	Pld	W	L	CP	TP	Qualification
1	Sergey Kozyrev (RUS)	2	2	0	8	8	Gold-medal match
2	Luis Orozco (MEX)	2	1	1	6	5	Bronze-medal match
3	Dragan Velinov (MKD)	2	0	2	0	0	Classification 5th/6th place match

Source: UWW

	Score		CP
Luis Orozco (MEX)	1–4	Sergey Kozyrev (RUS)	1–3 VPO1
Dragan Velinov (MKD)	0–4 Fall	Luis Orozco (MEX)	0–5 VFA
Sergey Kozyrev (RUS)	4–0 Fall	Dragan Velinov (MKD)	5–0 VFA

=== Finals ===
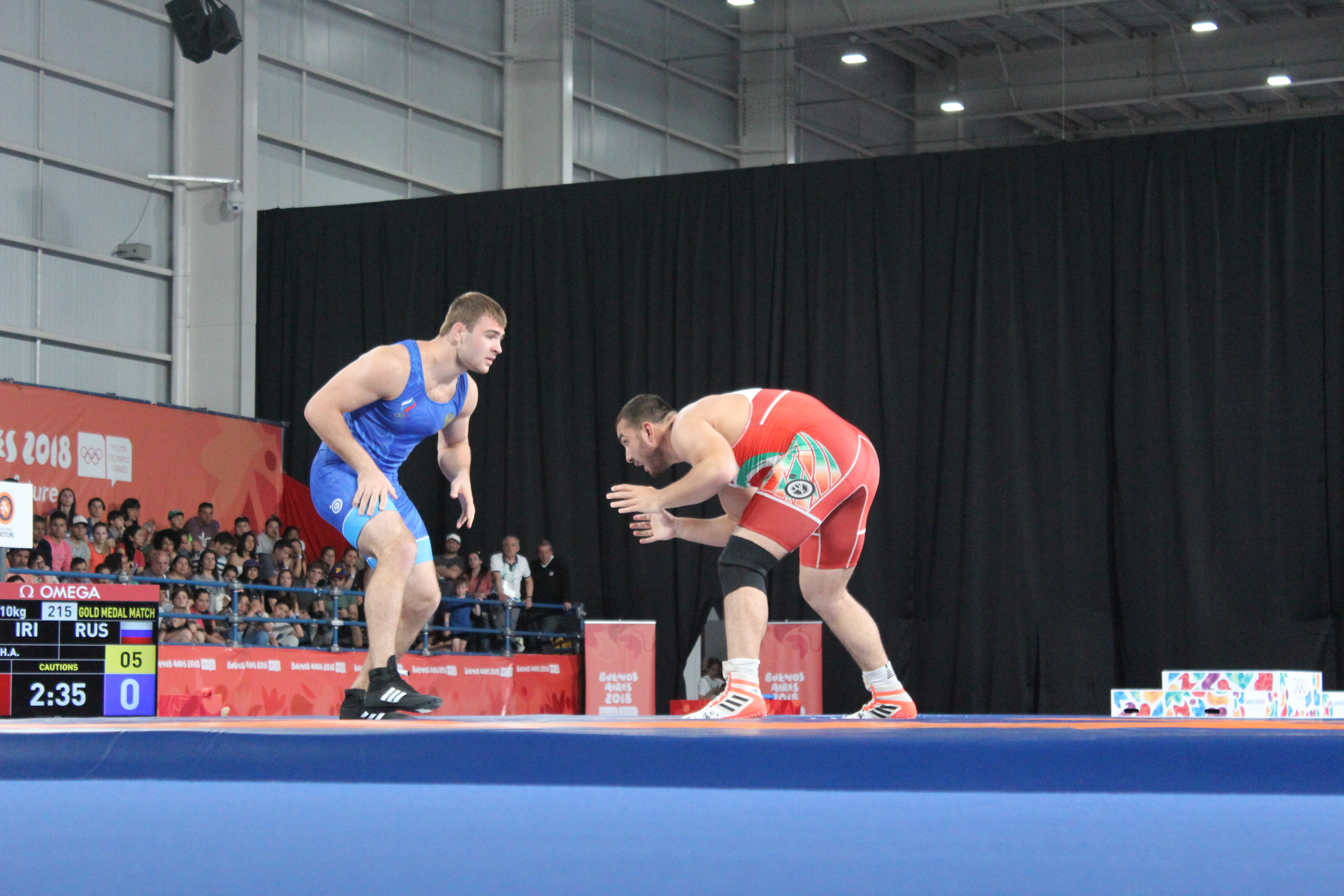
Amir Hossein Zare vs. Sergey Kozyrev

Gold-medal match
Amir Hossein Zare (IRI)	5
Sergey Kozyrev (RUS)	6

Bronze-medal match
Ahmed Mahmoud Khalil (EGY)	6
Luis Orozco (MEX)	2

Classification 5th/6th place match
Thomas Barns (AUS)	10
Dragan Velinov (MKD)	0

== Final rankings ==
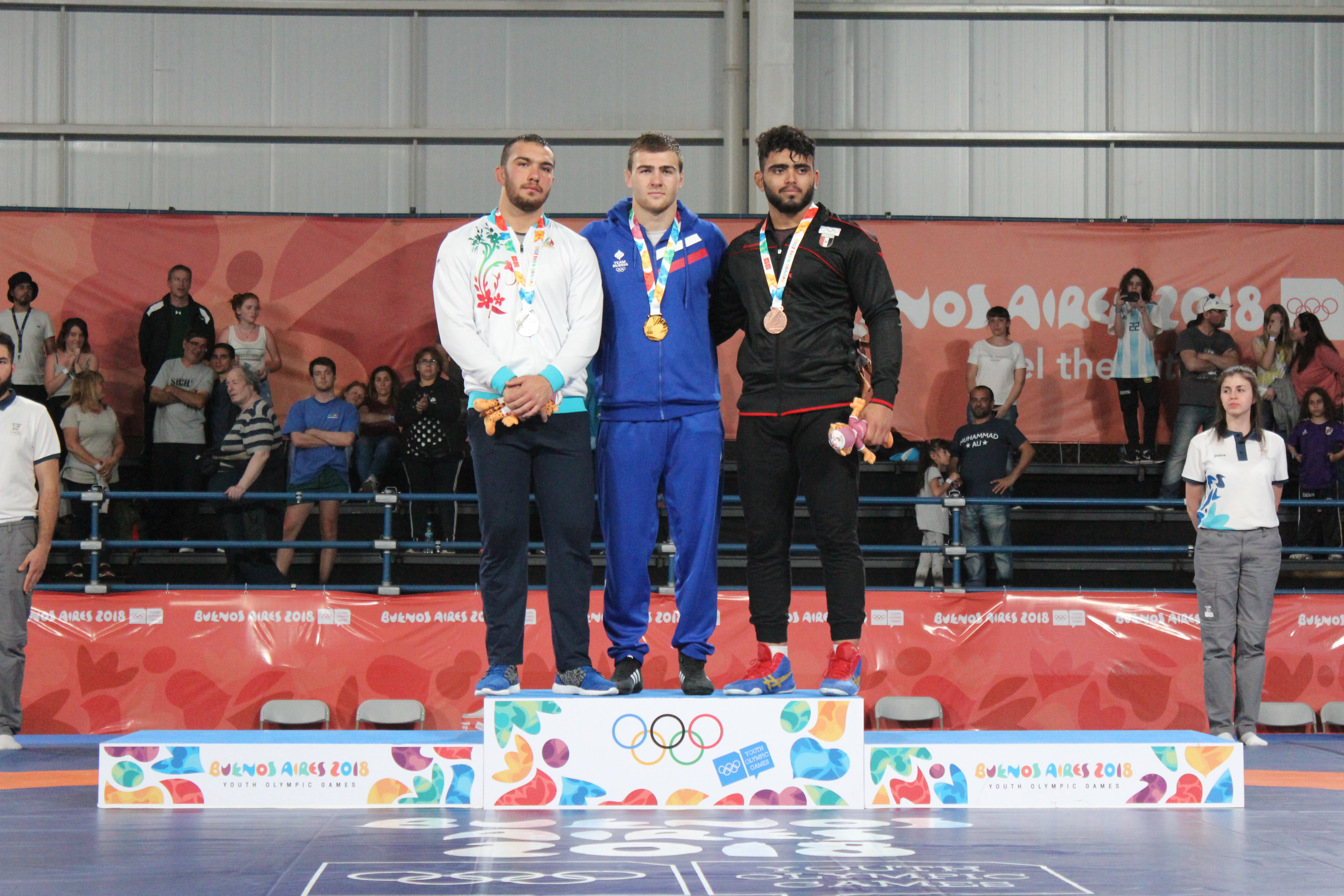
Medal ceremony

Rank	Athlete
1st place, gold medalist(s)	Sergey Kozyrev (RUS)
2nd place, silver medalist(s)	Amir Hossein Zare (IRI)
3rd place, bronze medalist(s)	Ahmed Mahmoud Khalil (EGY)
4	Luis Orozco (MEX)
5	Thomas Barns (AUS)
6	Dragan Velinov (MKD)
