= Equestrian at the 2018 Summer Youth Olympics =

Equestrian at the III Summer Youth Olympic Games
- Venue: Argentine Equestrian Club
- Dates: 8–13 October
- No. of events: 2
- Competitors: 30 from 30 nations

Equestrian at the 2018 Summer Youth Olympics was held from 8 to 13 October 2018 at the Argentine Equestrian Club in Buenos Aires, Argentina.

== Qualification ==
Each National Olympic Committee (NOC) could enter a maximum of 1 athlete. Athletes qualified into one of six zones (Europe, North America, South America, Asia, Australasia and Africa) containing five athletes. As hosts, Argentina was automatically given a rider and up to 6 spots were available to the Tripartite Commission, though not all were used; this caused a reduction from the zone quota depending which zone the chosen athlete is from. The remaining places were decided from qualification events or the 2017 FEI World Jumping Challenge (Category A) rankings. Should a zone not have enough athletes, the spot would be filled by athletes from another zone.

To be eligible to participate at the Youth Olympics athletes must have been born between 1 January 2000 and 31 December 2003. Furthermore, all riders must have obtained a Certificate of Capability. The certificate must be obtained between 1 April 2017 and 31 May 2018 at a registered event.

Continent	Event	Date	Total Places	Qualified
Africa	FEI World Jumping Challenge Rankings	31 December 2017	4	Egypt; South Africa; Zambia; Zimbabwe
Africa	Tripartite Invitation	–	1	Mauritius
Asia	FEI World Jumping Challenge Rankings	31 December 2017	7	Hong Kong; Iran; Jordan; Qatar; Syria; United Arab Emirates; Uzbekistan
Asia	Tripartite Invitation	–	1	Iraq
Europe	FEI European Junior Jumping Championships	8–13 August 2017	5	Belgium; Great Britain; Hungary; Italy; Netherlands
North America	FEI North American Junior Championships	18–23 July 2017	2	Mexico; United States
North America	FEI World Jumping Challenge Rankings	31 December 2017	2	Honduras; Panama
North America	Tripartite Invitation	–	1	Haiti
Oceania	FEI World Jumping Challenge Rankings	31 December 2017	2	Australia; New Zealand
South America	Host Nation	–	1	Argentina
South America	FEI World Jumping Challenge Rankings	31 December 2017	4	Bolivia; Brazil; Paraguay; Venezuela
TOTAL			30	

== Medal summary ==
=== Medal table ===
Rank	Nation	Gold	Silver	Bronze	Total
–	Mixed-NOCs	1	1	1	3
1	Italy	1	0	0	1
2	United Arab Emirates	0	1	0	1
3	Honduras	0	0	1	1
Totals (3 entries)		2	2	2	6

=== Events ===
Event	Gold	Silver	Bronze
Individual jumping	Giacomo Casadei; Italy	Omar Almarzooqi; United Arab Emirates	Pedro Espinosa; Honduras
Team jumping	North America; Nicole Meyer Robredo; Mexico; Mateo Philippe Coles; Haiti; Marissa del Pilar Thompson; Panama; Pedro Espinosa; Honduras; Mattie Hatcher; United States	Europe; Jack Whitaker; Great Britain; Giacomo Casadei; Italy; Vince Jármy; Hungary; Rowen van de Mheen; Netherlands; Simon Jan Morssinkhof; Belgium	Africa; Ahmed Nasser Elnaggar; Egypt; Brianagh Lindsay Clark; Zimbabwe; Anna Bunty Howard; Zambia; Hannah Ivy Carton; South Africa; Margaux Koenig; Mauritius
