= Saudi Arabia at the 2018 Summer Youth Olympics =

- IOC code: KSA
- NOC: Saudi Arabian Olympic Committee
- Website: http://www.olympic.sa/

in Buenos Aires, Argentina 6 – 18 October 2018
- Competitors: 9 in 6 sports
- Medals Ranked 56th: Gold 1 Silver 0 Bronze 2 Total 3

Summer Youth Olympics appearances
- 2010; 2014; 2018

Saudi Arabia participated at the 2018 Summer Youth Olympics in Buenos Aires, Argentina from 6 to 18 October 2018.

== Competitors ==
| Sport | Boys | Girls | Total |
|---|---|---|---|
| Athletics | 3 | 1 | 4 |
| Fencing | 1 | 0 | 1 |
| Karate | 1 | 0 | 1 |
| Swimming | 1 | 0 | 1 |
| Taekwondo | 1 | 0 | 1 |
| Weightlifting | 1 | 0 | 1 |
| Total | 8 | 1 | 9 |

== Fencing ==
Saudi Arabia was given a quota to compete by the tripartite committee.

- Boys' Sabre - 1 quota

== Karate ==
Saudi Arabia qualified one athlete based on its performance at one of the Karate Qualification Tournaments.

- Boys' -61 kg - Mohammad Al-Assiri

| Athlete | Event | Elimination round | | | | Semifinals | Final | |
| Athlete | Event | Opposition Score | Opposition Score | Opposition Score | Rank | Opposition Score | Opposition Score | Rank |
|---|---|---|---|---|---|---|---|---|
| Mohammed Al Assiri | Boys' -61 kg | Hammad (JOR); D 0–0 | Tello (ARG); W 2–0 | Veseli (MKD); W 4–0 | 1 | Oussama Edari (MAR); W 2–0 | Masaki Yamaoka (JPN); W 8–0 | 1st place, gold medalist(s) |

== Taekwondo ==
| Athlete | Event | Round of 16 | Quarterfinals | Semifinals | Final | |
| Athlete | Event | Opposition Result | Opposition Result | Opposition Result | Opposition Result | Rank |
|---|---|---|---|---|---|---|
| Hasham Bandar bin Dookhy | Boys −63 kg | Bye | Gabriele Caulo (ITA); L 15-18 | did not advance | | |

== Weightlifting ==
Saudi Arabia qualified one athlete based on its performance at the 2018 Asian Youth Championships.

| Athlete | Event | Snatch | | Clean & Jerk | | Total | Rank |
| Athlete | Event | Result | Rank | Result | Rank | Total | Rank |
|---|---|---|---|---|---|---|---|
| Ali Yousef Alothman | Boys' −85 kg | 130 | 4 | 169 | 3 | 299 | 3rd place, bronze medalist(s) |
