= Jordan at the 2018 Summer Youth Olympics =

- IOC code: JOR
- NOC: Jordan Olympic Committee
- Website: http://www.joc.jo/

in Buenos Aires, Argentina 6 – 18 October 2018
- Competitors: 12 in 6 sports
- Medals Ranked 83rd: Gold 0 Silver 0 Bronze 1 Total 1

Summer Youth Olympics appearances
- 2010; 2014; 2018

Jordan participated at the 2018 Summer Youth Olympics in Buenos Aires, Argentina from 6 October to 18 October 2018.

== Basketball ==
Jordan qualified a boys' team based on the U18 3x3 National Federation Ranking.

- Boys' tournament - 1 team of 4 athletes

Event	Group stage					Quarterfinal	Semifinal	Final / BM	
Event	Opposition Score	Opposition Score	Opposition Score	Opposition Score	Rank	Opposition Score	Opposition Score	Opposition Score	Rank
Boys' tournament	Slovenia; L 4-22	Georgia; L 4-21	China; L 11-21	Turkmenistan; L 5-19	5	did not advance			

== Equestrian ==
Jordan qualified a rider based on its ranking in the FEI World Jumping Challenge Rankings.

- Individual Jumping - 1 athlete

Summary

Athlete	Horse	Event	Qualification					Final					Total	
Athlete	Horse	Event	Round 1		Round 2			Round A		Round B			Total	
Athlete	Horse	Event	Penalties	Rank	Penalties	Total	Rank	Penalties	Rank	Penalties	Total	Rank	Penalties	Rank
Sara Hussein Saleh Al Armouti	Passe One Z	Individual	—					19	27 Q	4	23	26	23	26
Asia; Sara Hussein Saleh Al Armouti (JOR); Edgar Fung (HKG); Momen Zindaki (SYR); In Shaallah Hameed (IRQ); Abdushukur Sobirjonov (UZB)	Passe One Z The Winner Z Cooper Larquino; Kings Charade; Quby Z	Team	13 # 0; 0; 4; 8 #	4	1; 4; 0; 4 # 4 #	5	9	—					38	6

== Karate ==
Jordan qualified one athlete based on its performance at one of the Karate Qualification Tournaments.

- Boys' -61 kg - Abdallah Hammad

Athlete	Event	Elimination round				Semifinals	Final	
Athlete	Event	Opposition Score	Opposition Score	Opposition Score	Rank	Opposition Score	Opposition Score	Rank
Abdallah Hammad	Boys' -61 kg	Veseli (MKD); L 0–1	Al Assiri (KSA); D 0–0	Tello (ARG); W 1–0	3	did not advance		

== Swimming ==
Boys

Athlete	Event	Heats		Semifinals		Final	
Athlete	Event	Time	Rank	Time	Rank	Time	Rank
Mohammed Bedour	Boys' 50 metre freestyle	23.62	20	did not advance			
Mohammed Bedour	Boys' 100 metre freestyle	51.56	20	did not advance			
Amro Al-Wir	Boys' 50 metre breaststroke	29.71	26	did not advance			
Amro Al-Wir	Boys' 200 metre breaststroke	2:20.65	16	—		did not advance	

== Taekwondo ==
Boys

Athlete	Event	Round of 16	Quarterfinals	Semifinals	Final	
Athlete	Event	Opposition Result	Opposition Result	Opposition Result	Opposition Result	Rank
Zaid Abdul Kareem	55 kg	Bye	Hugo Arillo (ESP); W 25–5	Kim Kang-min (KOR); L 16–31	did not advance	3rd place, bronze medalist(s)

Girls

Athlete	Event	Round of 16	Quarterfinals	Semifinals	Final	
Athlete	Event	Opposition Result	Opposition Result	Opposition Result	Opposition Result	Rank
Rama Abo-Alrub	55 kg	Bye	Safia Salih (MAR); L 8–12	did not advance		
Natali Hamaidi	63 kg	Bye	Yalda Valinejad (IRI); L 2–12	did not advance		
