= Sandy Macedo =

Brazilian taekwondo practitioner

Personal information
- Full name: Sandy Camila Leite Macedo
- Born: 14 April 2001 (age 25) São José dos Campos, São Paulo

Sport
- Country: Brazil
- Sport: Taekwondo
- Weight class: 57 kg
Medal record
Women's taekwondo
Representing Brazil
Pan American Games
Bronze medal – third place	2023 Santiago	Team
Pan American Championships
Silver medal – second place	2021 Cancún	57 kg
Silver medal – second place	2022 Punta Cana	57 kg
South American Games
Gold medal – first place	2022 Asunción	57 kg
Junior Pan American Games
Gold medal – first place	2021 Cali-Valle	57 kg
Summer Youth Olympics
Bronze medal – third place	2018 Buenos Aires	55 kg

Sandy Camila Leite Macedo (born 14 April 2001) is a Brazilian taekwondo practitioner. She won the gold medal in the women's 57 kg event at the 2022 South American Games held in Asunción, Paraguay. She also won the silver medal in her event at the 2021 Pan American Taekwondo Championships held in Cancún, Mexico.

In 2018, she won one of the bronze medals in the girls' 55 kg event at the Summer Youth Olympics held in Buenos Aires, Argentina. She competed in the women's featherweight event at the 2019 World Taekwondo Championships held in Manchester, United Kingdom.

In 2021, she won the gold medal in the women's 57 kg event at the Junior Pan American Games held in Cali, Colombia. She represented Brazil at the 2023 Pan American Games in Santiago, Chile.
