= Negin Altooni =

Iranian karateka (born 2001)

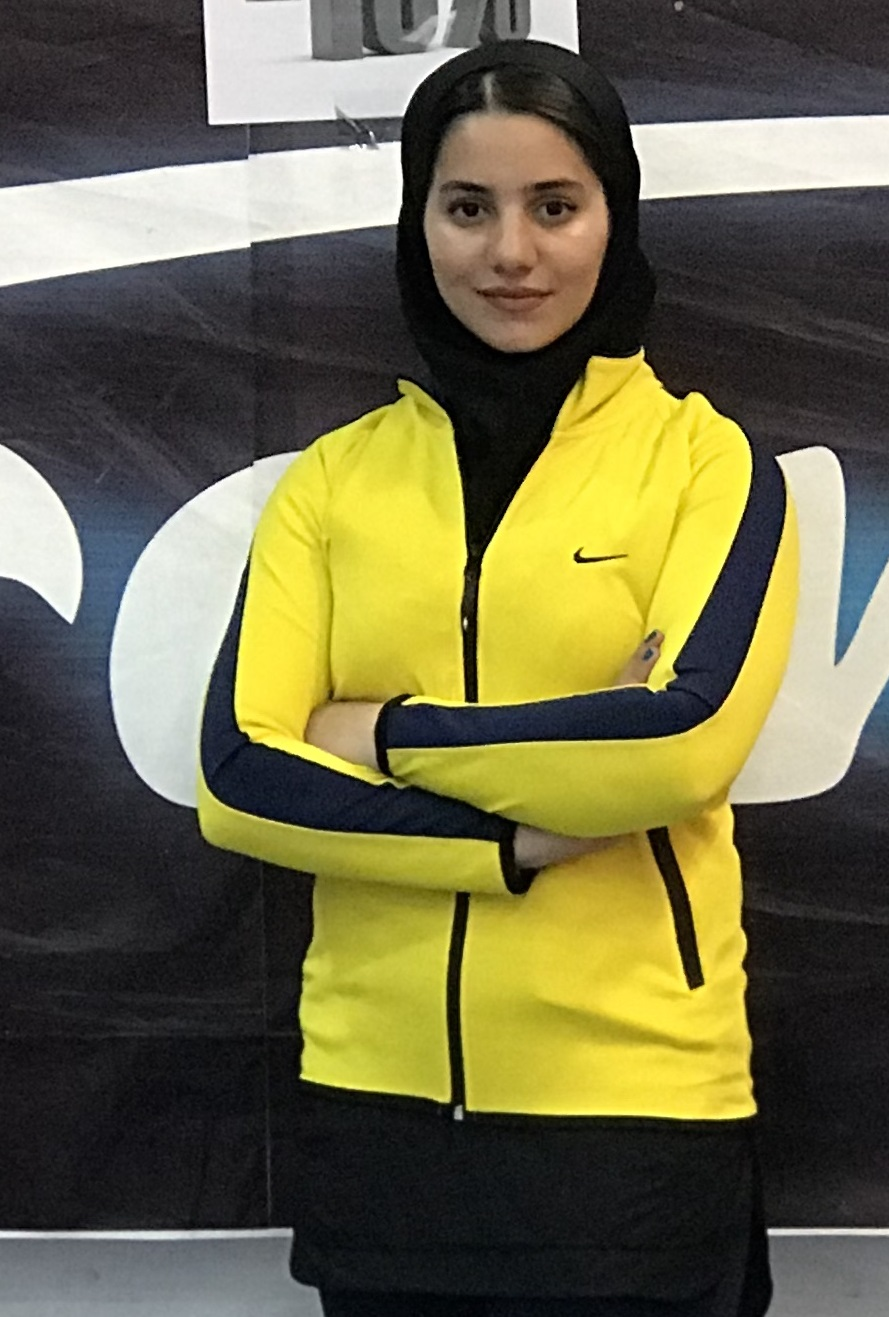

Personal information
- Born: 1 March 2001 (age 25) Ilam, Iran
- Education: Islamic Azad University of Karaj, Petroleum Engineering
- Height: 168 cm (5 ft 6 in)
- Weight: 59 kg (130 lb)
- Website: www.instagram.com/neginaltooni/

Sport
- Sport: Karate
- Event: Kumite
Medal record
girls Karate +59kg
Representing Iran
Youth Olympic Games
Bronze medal – third place	2018 Buenos Aires	+59kg
Karate1 Youth League
Bronze medal – third place	2018 Croatia	+59kg
Youth Asian Karate Competitions
Gold medal – first place	2018 Japan	+59kg

Negin Altooni (born 1 March 2001) is an Iranian karateka. She won bronze medal at the 2018 Summer Youth Olympics, and won gold medal at the Youth Asian karate championships 2018 Japan She also finished third in the Croatia 2018 Karate1 Youth League Championship and Earned the Youth Olympics quota.

== Achievements ==
Year	Competition	Venue	Rank	Event
2018	Summer Youth Olympics	Buenos Aires, Argentina	3rd	Kumite +59 kg

== See also ==
- Karate at the 2018 Summer Youth Olympics
- Hamideh Abbasali
- Sajad Ganjzadeh
- Mohammad Ali Khosravi
