= Guatemala at the 2018 Summer Youth Olympics =

- IOC code: GUA
- NOC: Guatemalan Olympic Committee
- Website: http://www.cog.org.gt/

in Buenos Aires, Argentina 6 – 18 October 2018
- Competitors: 10 in 8 sports
- Medals: Gold 0 Silver 0 Bronze 0 Total 0

Summer Youth Olympics appearances
- 2010; 2014; 2018; 2026

Guatemala participated at the 2018 Summer Youth Olympics in Buenos Aires, Argentina from 6 to 18 October 2018.

== Beach volleyball ==
Guatemala qualified a girls' team based on their performance at the 2018 AFECAVOL Zone U19 Championship.

Athlete	Event	Group stage				Round of 24	Round of 16	Quarterfinal	Semifinal	Final / BM	Rank
Athlete	Event	Opposition Score	Opposition Score	Opposition Score	Rank	Opposition Score	Opposition Score	Opposition Score	Opposition Score	Opposition Score	Rank
Juárez–Alvarado	Girls' tournament	Gierczynska–Jundziłł (POL); L 0-2	J.J. Zeng–Sh. T. Cao (CHN); L 0-2	Niro–Nada (EGY); W 2-0	3	Baumann–Betschart (SUI); L 0-2	did not advance				

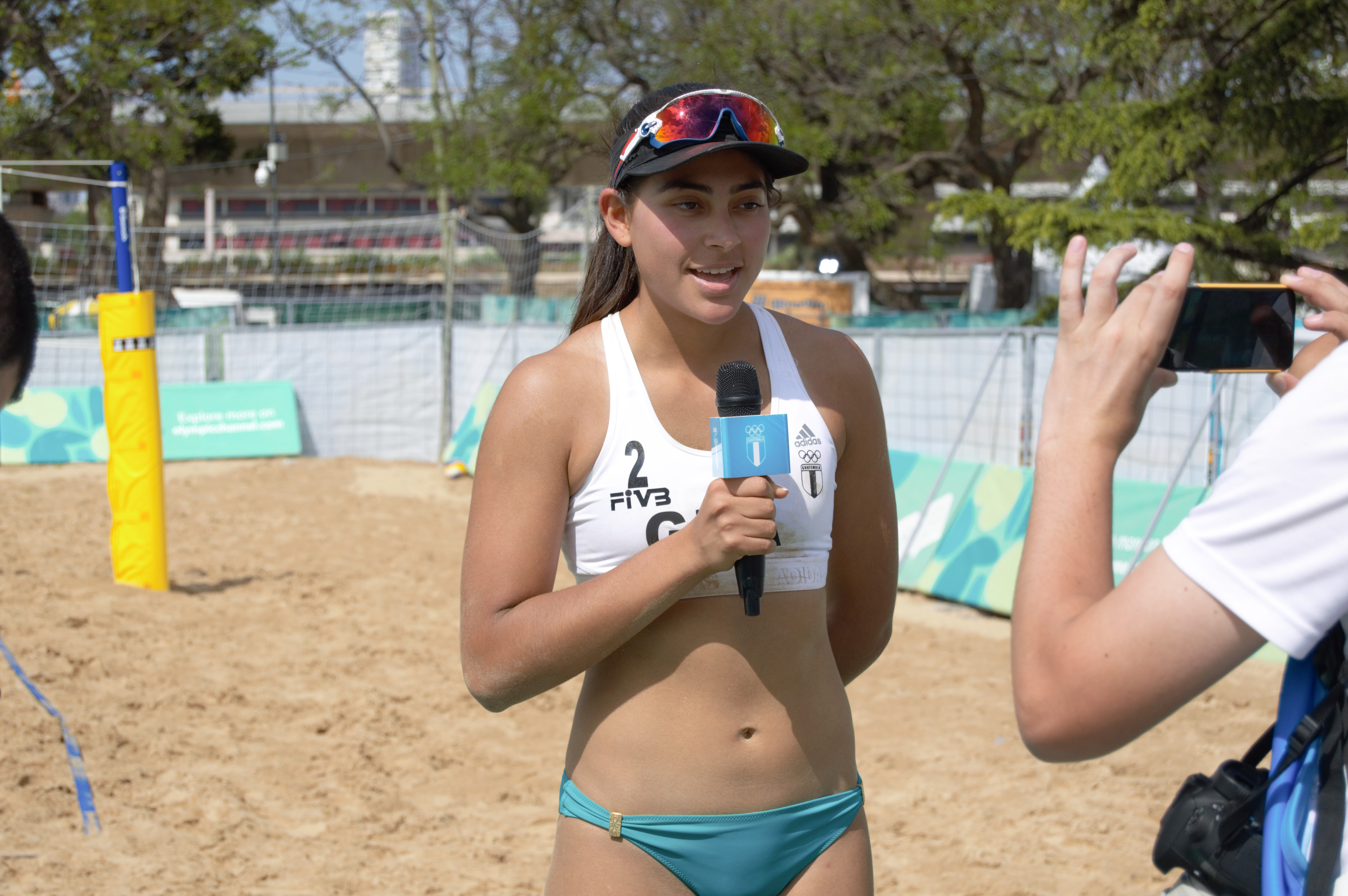
Maria Fernanda Juárez Peña

== Gymnastics ==
=== Artistic ===
Guatemala qualified one gymnast based on its performance at the 2018 American Junior Championship.

- Girls' artistic individual all-around - 1 quota

Girls

Athlete	Event	Apparatus				Total	Rank
Athlete	Event	V	UB	BB	F	Total	Rank
Karla Pérez	Qualification	12.033	8.600	11.566	11.333	43.532	30

=== Multidiscipline ===
Team	Athlete	Acrobatic	Artistic	Rhythmic	Trampoline	Total points	Rank
Team Oksana Chusovitina (Black)	Viktoryia Akhotnikava (BLR); Ilya Famenkou (BLR)	12	—N/a			352	3rd place, bronze medalist(s)
Team Oksana Chusovitina (Black)	Brandon Briones (USA)	—N/a	32	—N/a		352	3rd place, bronze medalist(s)
Team Oksana Chusovitina (Black)	Adam Tobin (GBR)	—N/a	45	—N/a		352	3rd place, bronze medalist(s)
Team Oksana Chusovitina (Black)	Mohamed Afify (EGY)	—N/a	–	—N/a		352	3rd place, bronze medalist(s)
Team Oksana Chusovitina (Black)	Indira Ulmasova (UZB)	—N/a	52	—N/a		352	3rd place, bronze medalist(s)
Team Oksana Chusovitina (Black)	Karla Pérez (GUA)	—N/a	35	—N/a		352	3rd place, bronze medalist(s)
Team Oksana Chusovitina (Black)	Tonya Paulsson (SWE)	—N/a	38	—N/a		352	3rd place, bronze medalist(s)
Team Oksana Chusovitina (Black)	Lidiia Iakovleva (AUS)	—N/a		35	—N/a	352	3rd place, bronze medalist(s)
Team Oksana Chusovitina (Black)	Aino Yamada (JPN)	—N/a		31	—N/a	352	3rd place, bronze medalist(s)
Team Oksana Chusovitina (Black)	Lilly Rotärmel (GER)	—N/a		34	—N/a	352	3rd place, bronze medalist(s)
Team Oksana Chusovitina (Black)	Santiago Escallier (ARG)	—N/a			21	352	3rd place, bronze medalist(s)
Team Oksana Chusovitina (Black)	Antonia Sakellaridou (GRE)	—N/a			17	352	3rd place, bronze medalist(s)

== Karate ==
Guatemala qualified one athlete based on its performance at one of the Karate Qualification Tournaments.

- Boys' -61 kg - Pedro de la Roca

Athlete	Event	Group Stage				Semifinal	Final / BM	
Athlete	Event	Opposition Score	Opposition Score	Opposition Score	Rank	Opposition Score	Opposition Score	Rank
Pedropablo de la Roca	Boys' 61 kg	Oussama Edari (MAR); L (1–4)	Alireza Farajikouhikheili (IRI); W (1–0)	Masaki Yamaoka (JPN); L (0–4)	3	did not advance		

== Rowing ==
Guatemala qualified one boat based on its performance at the American Qualification Regatta.

- Girls' single sculls - 1 athlete

== Tennis ==
Singles

Athlete	Event	Round of 32	Round of 16	Quarterfinals	Semifinals	Final / BM	
Athlete	Event	Opposition Score	Opposition Score	Opposition Score	Opposition Score	Opposition Score	Rank
MG Rivera Corado	Girls' singles	S Nahimana (BDI); L (2-6, 1-6)	did not advance				

Doubles

Athlete	Event	Round of 32	Round of 16	Quarterfinals	Semifinals	Final / BM	
Athlete	Event	Opposition Score	Opposition Score	Opposition Score	Opposition Score	Opposition Score	Rank
S Nahimana (BDI); MG Rivera Corado (GUA)	Girls' doubles	ML Carlé (ARG); Osorio (COL); L (1-6, 3-6)	did not advance				
MG Rivera Corado (GUA); N Hardt (DOM)	Mixed doubles	V Ivanov (NZL); R Hijikata (AUS); W (3-6, 6-4, 10-7)	J Garland (TPE); C-h Tseng (TPE); L (4-6, 2-6)	did not advance			

== Weightlifting ==
Athlete	Event	Snatch		Clean & jerk		Total	Rank
Athlete	Event	Result	Rank	Result	Rank	Total	Rank
Maria Alejandra Maldonado Panjoj	Girls' +63 kg	76	7	93	7	169	7
