= Safia Salih =

Moroccan taekwondo practitioner

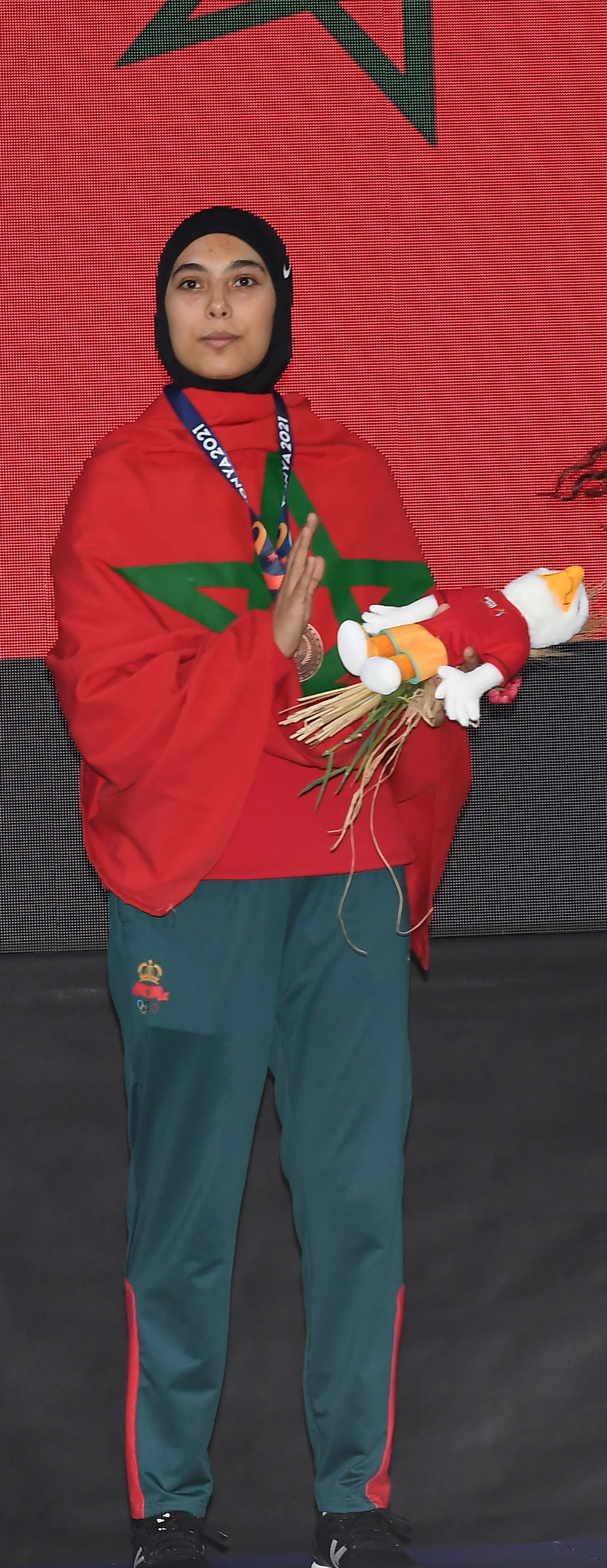

Personal information
- Born: 16 March 2001 (age 25)

Sport
- Country: Morocco
- Sport: Taekwondo
Medal record
Women's taekwondo
Representing Morocco
African Games
Gold medal – first place	2019 Rabat	62 kg
Bronze medal – third place	2023 Accra	67 kg
African Taekwondo Championships
Gold medal – first place	2022 Kigali	62 kg
Bronze medal – third place	2023 Abidjan	67 kg
African Youth Games
Gold medal – first place	2018 Alger	55 kg
Summer Youth Olympics
Silver medal – second place	2018 Buenos Aires	–55 kg
Islamic Solidarity Games
Bronze medal – third place	2022 Konya	– 67 kg

Safia Salih (born 16 March 2001) is a Moroccan taekwondo practitioner. She represented Morocco at the 2019 African Games held in Rabat, Morocco and she won the gold medal in the women's 62 kg event.

At the 2018 Summer Youth Olympics held in Buenos Aires, Argentina, she won the silver medal in the 55 kg event. In 2019, she competed in the women's lightweight event at the World Taekwondo Championships where she was eliminated by Anna-Lena Frömming in her first match.

She competed in the women's 67 kg event at the 2022 Mediterranean Games held in Oran, Algeria. She was eliminated in her second match by eventual bronze medalist Magda Wiet-Hénin of France.

She competed in the women's lightweight event at the 2022 World Taekwondo Championships held in Guadalajara, Mexico. She also competed in the women's welterweight event at the 2023 World Taekwondo Championships held in Baku, Azerbaijan.
