= Navid Mohammadi =

Iranian karateka

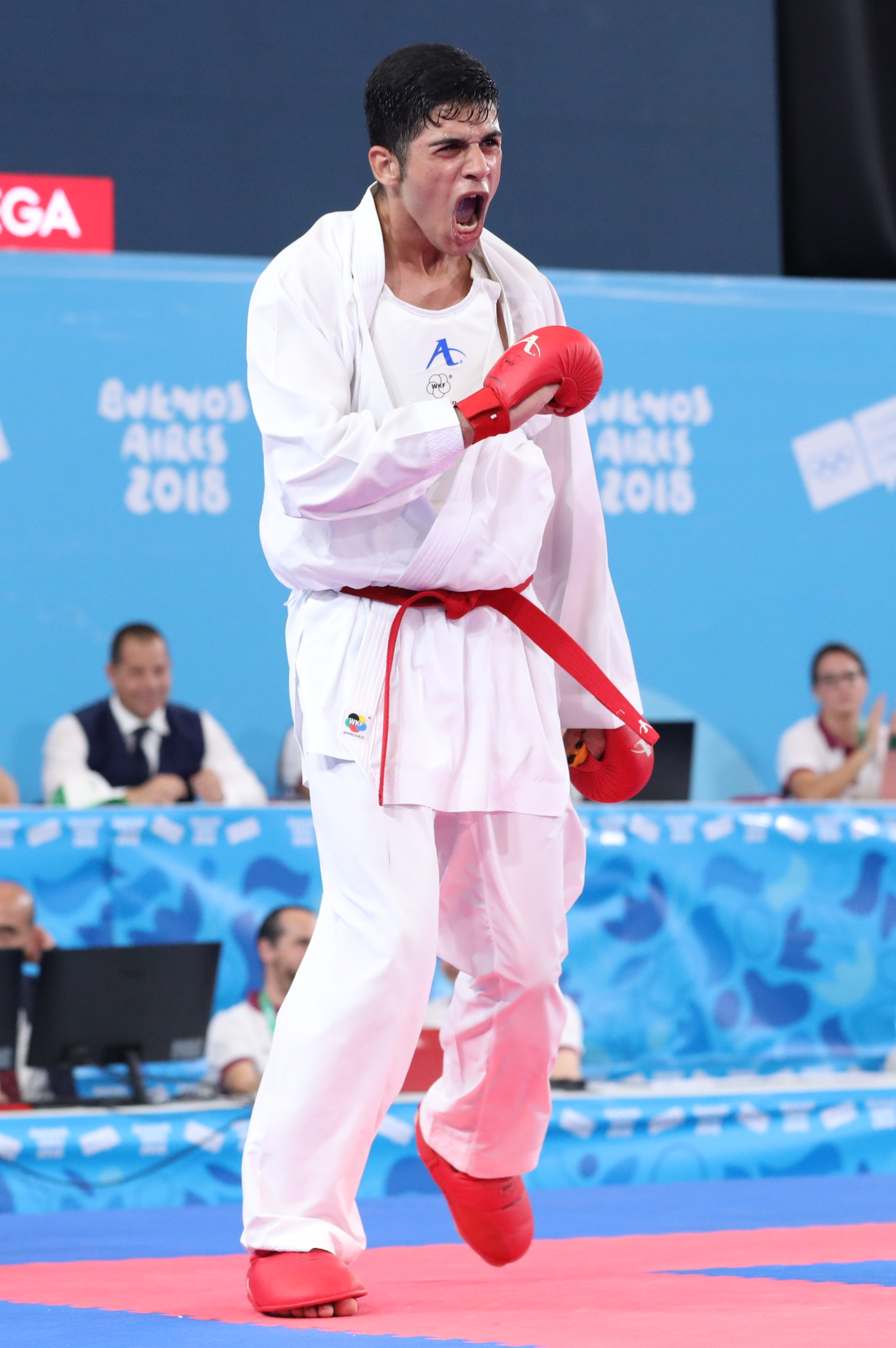

Personal information
- Born: 21 March 2001 Shiraz, Iran
- Died: June 6, 2019 (aged 18) Shiraz, Iran
- Height: 180 cm (5 ft 11 in)
- Weight: 80 kg (176 lb)

Sport
- Sport: Karate
- Event: Kumite
Medal record
Representing Iran
Youth Olympic Games
Gold medal – first place	2018 Buenos Aires	+68kg

Navid Mohammadi (21 March 2001 - 6 June 2019, in Shiraz) was an Iranian karateka who won the gold medal in the +68 kg boys' karate event at the 2018 Summer Youth Olympics. He also became the first Iranian to win a gold medal in karate at the Youth Olympics.

== Early life ==
Navid Mohammadi was born on March 21, 2001, in Golshan Town, Shiraz. He began his training in karate at the age of six under the guidance of his father, Mohammad Hadi Mohammad, and his uncle, Mohammad Reza Mohammad, a world gold medalist. From 2014 onwards, he participated in the training camps of Iran's national junior karate teams and, despite his young age, was also invited to the training camps of the senior national team.

== Death ==
On the early morning of Thursday, June 6, 2019, Mohammad was driving a hatchback car on the Kuhsar Expressway in Shiraz. Due to excessive speed on a dangerous curve after the Kuhsar tunnel, his vehicle veered off the road, overturned, and resulted in his death.

== Achievements ==
Year	Competition	Venue	Rank	Event
2018	Summer Youth Olympics	Buenos Aires, Argentina	1st place, gold medalist(s)	Kumite +68 kg

== See also ==
- Karate at the 2018 Summer Youth Olympics
- Hamideh Abbasali
- Sajjad Ganjzadeh
- Mohammad Ali Khosravi
