= Weightlifting at the 2018 Summer Youth Olympics =

Weightlifting at the III Summer Youth Olympic Games
- Venue: Parque Polideportivo Roca
- Dates: 7–13 October
- No. of events: 12 (6 boys, 6 girls)
- Competitors: 102 from 63 nations

Weightlifting at the 2018 Summer Youth Olympics was held from 7 to 13 October. The events took place at Parque Polideportivo Roca in Buenos Aires, Argentina.

== Qualification ==
Each National Olympic Committee (NOC) can enter a maximum of 4 competitors, 2 per each gender. As hosts, Argentina was guaranteed two quotas, 1 athlete per gender and a further 10 boys and 10 girls was to be decided by the Tripartite Commission. However only 9 girls were selected. The remaining 88 places shall be decided by team classification results from qualification events, namely the 2017 World Youth Championships and five continental qualification tournaments.

To be eligible to participate at the Youth Olympics athletes must have been born between 1 January 2001 and 31 December 2003. Furthermore, NOCs will only be allowed to enter a single athlete in an event and the chosen athlete must have participated in either the 2017 World Youth Championships or a continental championship in 2017 or 2018.

=== Boys ===
Event	Location	Date	Quotas	Qualified
Host nation	-	-	1	Argentina
2017 World Youth Championships	(Thailand) Bangkok	3–10 April 2017	2	~~China~~^{[a]} ~~Kazakhstan~~^{[a]} Iran; Turkey^{[a]} ~~Russia~~^{[a]} Thailand
2017 World Youth Championships	(Thailand) Bangkok	3–10 April 2017	1	United States*; Uzbekistan; Azerbaijan^{[a]} ~~Ukraine~~^{[a]} ~~Indonesia~~; Bulgaria; Colombia; ~~Chinese Taipei~~; Armenia^{[a]} Venezuela; Italy
2018 African Youth Championships	(Egypt) Sharm El Sheikh	23–30 March 2018	1	Egypt; Algeria; ~~Libya~~; South Africa
2018 Asian Youth Championships	(Uzbekistan) Urgench	20–30 April 2018	1	Turkmenistan; India; Saudi Arabia; ~~Kyrgyzstan~~
2018 Pan American Youth Championships	(Colombia) Palmira	3–10 June 2018	1	Mexico; Ecuador; Peru; Puerto Rico
2018 Oceania Youth Championships	(New Caledonia) Mont Dore	22–30 June 2018	1	Australia; Nauru; ~~New Zealand~~; ~~Kiribati~~
2018 European Youth Championships	(Italy) Lignano Sabbiadoro	22–29 July 2018	1	Georgia; Romania; Czech Republic; Poland
Tripartite Invitation	-	-	1	Cameroon; ~~Equatorial Guinea~~; ~~Kiribati~~; Kosovo; Marshall Islands; ~~Nepal~~; Pakistan; ~~Saudi Arabia~~; ~~Turkmenistan~~; Uganda
Reallocation			1	Albania; Chile; Hungary; Greece; Lithuania; Madagascar; Mauritius; Netherlands; Panama; Slovakia; Spain; United Arab Emirates; Vietnam
Total			49	

=== Girls ===
Event	Location	Date	Quotas	Qualified
Host nation	-	-	1	Argentina
2017 World Youth Championships	(Thailand) Bangkok	3–10 April 2017	2	~~China~~^{[a]} ~~Kazakhstan~~^{[a]} Uzbekistan; Romania; Colombia; Turkey^{[a]} Thailand
2017 World Youth Championships	(Thailand) Bangkok	3–10 April 2017	1	Mexico; United States; ~~Ukraine~~^{[a]} Venezuela; ~~Russia~~^{[a]} North Korea; Vietnam; Ecuador; Indonesia; Italy
2018 African Youth Championships	(Egypt) Sharm El Sheikh	23–30 March 2018	1	Egypt; Algeria; Tunisia; Ghana
2018 Asian Youth Championships	(Uzbekistan) Urgench	20–30 April 2018	1	Japan; ~~Chinese Taipei~~; India; Mongolia
2018 Pan American Youth Championships	(Colombia) Palmira	3–10 June 2018	1	Peru; Dominican Republic; Guatemala; Puerto Rico
2018 Oceania Youth Championships	(New Caledonia) Mont Dore	22–30 June 2018	1	Nauru; Australia; New Zealand; Samoa
2018 European Youth Championships	(Italy) Lignano Sabbiadoro	22–29 July 2018	1	Bulgaria; Poland; Spain; Hungary
Tripartite Invitation	-	-	1	Bahrain; ~~Fiji~~; Madagascar; Malta; Mauritius; ~~Nauru~~; ~~Nicaragua~~; ~~Samoa~~; Solomon Islands
Reallocation			1	Armenia; Azerbaijan; Chile; Croatia; Great Britain; Greece; Latvia; Nigeria; Turkmenistan; United Arab Emirates
Total			53	

^{a} Armenia, Azerbaijan, China, Kazakhstan, Russia, Turkey and Ukraine handed one-year ban from IWF for doping violations. Afterwards IWF lifted doping suspensions against Turkey, Armenia and Azerbaijan.

== Medal summary ==
=== Medal table ===
Rank	Nation	Gold	Silver	Bronze	Total
1	Turkey	2	1	1	4
2	Uzbekistan	1	2	0	3
3	Vietnam	1	1	0	2
4	Mexico	1	0	1	2
4	Romania	1	0	1	2
6	Armenia	1	0	0	1
6	India	1	0	0	1
6	Iran	1	0	0	1
6	Italy	1	0	0	1
6	Tunisia	1	0	0	1
6	Venezuela	1	0	0	1
12	Colombia	0	2	1	3
13	Thailand	0	2	0	2
14	Bulgaria	0	1	1	2
14	Egypt	0	1	1	2
16	Azerbaijan	0	1	0	1
16	Georgia	0	1	0	1
18	Czech Republic	0	0	1	1
18	Indonesia	0	0	1	1
18	Netherlands	0	0	1	1
18	New Zealand	0	0	1	1
18	Saudi Arabia	0	0	1	1
18	United States	0	0	1	1
Totals (23 entries)		12	12	12	36

=== Boy's events ===
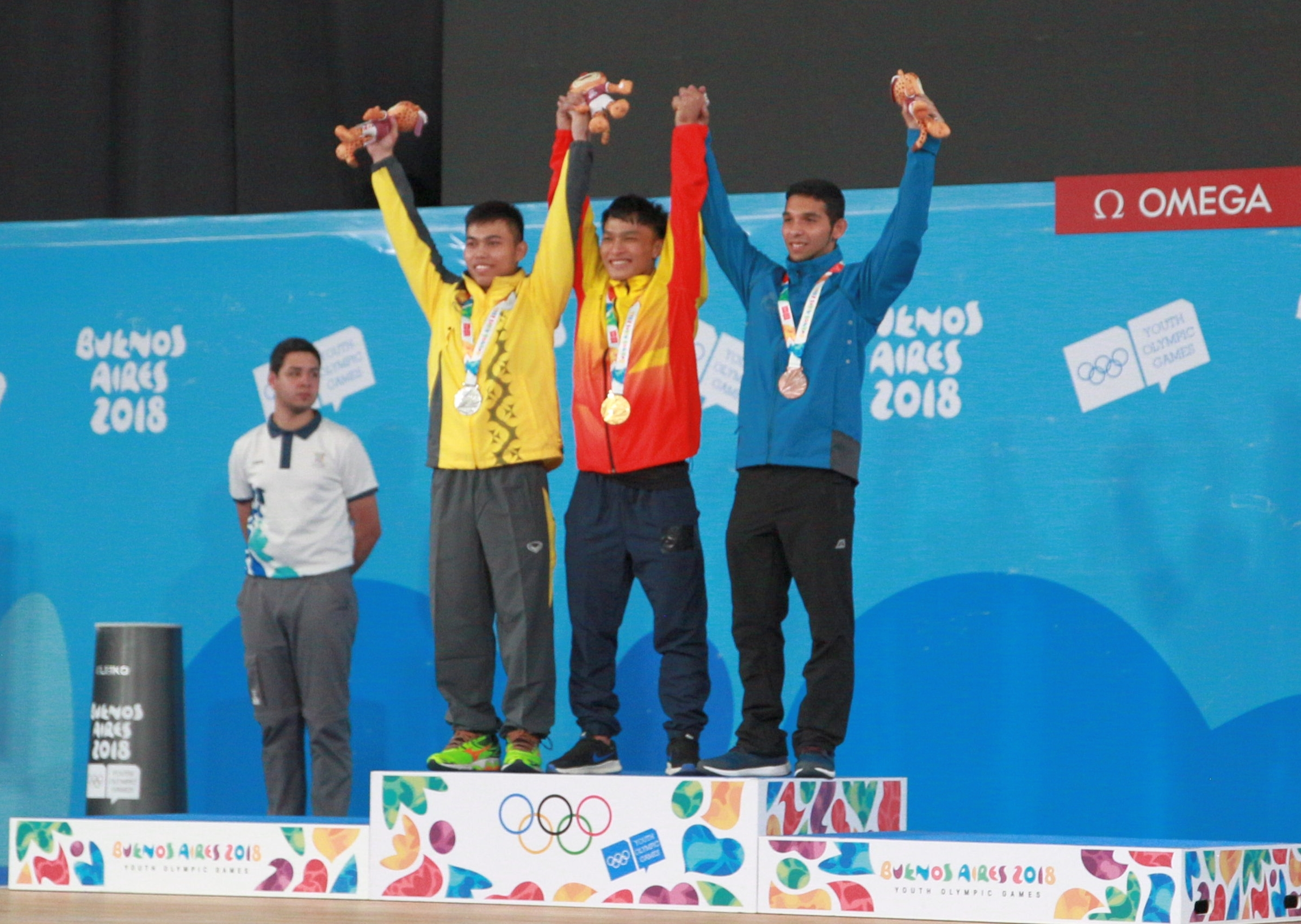
Boys' 56 kg podium

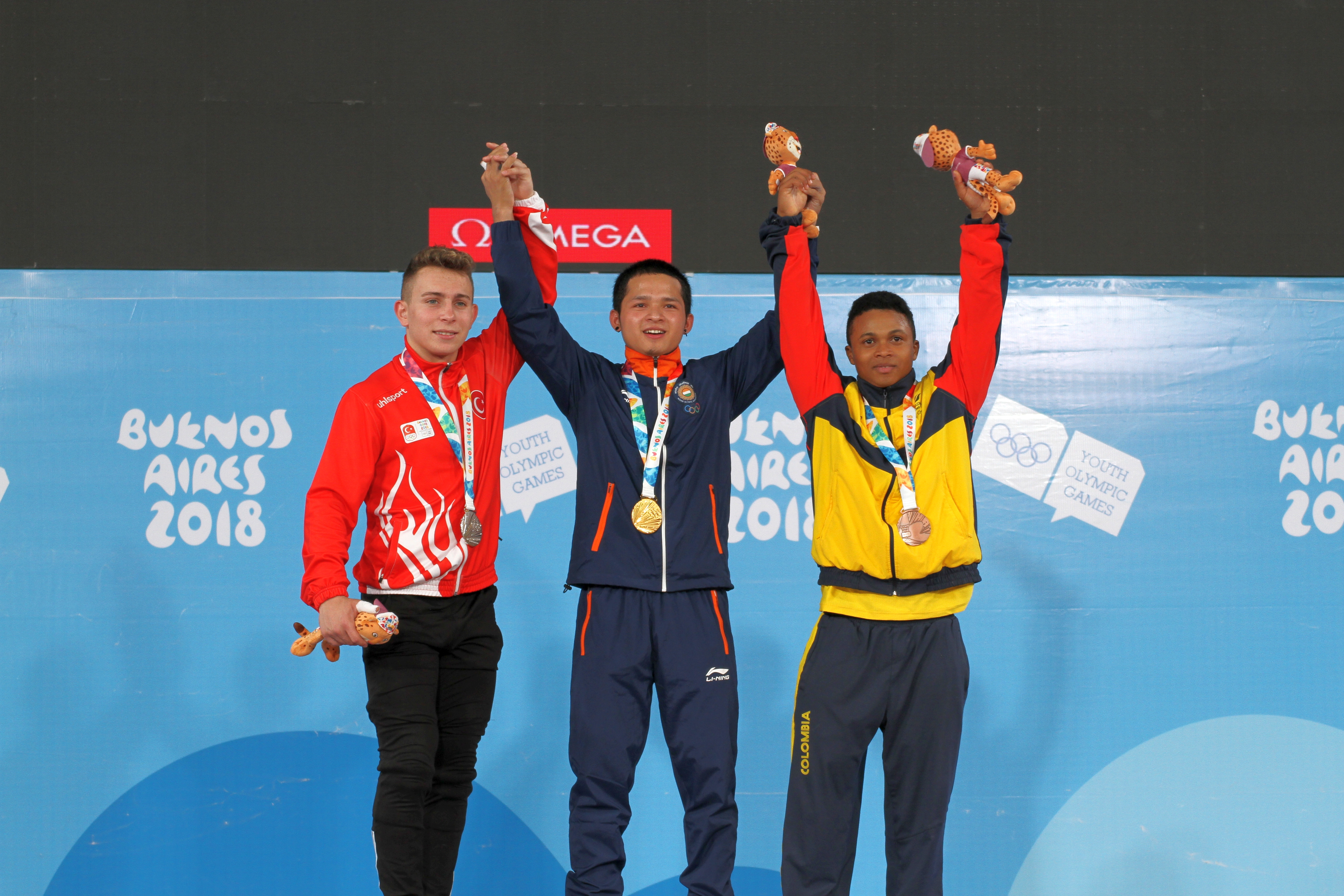
Boys' 62 kg podium

Event	Gold	Silver	Bronze
56 kg	Ngô Sơn Đỉnh; Vietnam	Natthawat Chomchuen; Thailand	František Polák; Czech Republic
62 kg	Jeremy Lalrinnunga; India	Caner Toptaş; Turkey	Estiven Villar; Colombia
69 kg	Muhammed Furkan Özbek; Turkey	Archil Malakmadze; Georgia	Mauricio Canul; Mexico
77 kg	Karen Margaryan; Armenia	Mukhammadkodir Toshtemirov; Uzbekistan	Abdalla Galal Mohamed Mostafa; Egypt
85 kg	Cristiano Ficco; Italy	Tarmenkhan Babayev; Azerbaijan	Ali Yousef Al-Othman; Saudi Arabia
+85 kg	Alireza Yousefi; Iran	Hristo Hristov; Bulgaria	Enzo Kuworge; Netherlands

=== Girl's events ===
Event	Gold	Silver	Bronze
44 kg	Katherin Echandía; Venezuela	Nguyễn Thị Thu Trang; Vietnam	Nida Karasakal; Turkey
48 kg	Yesica Hernández; Mexico	Yineth Santoya; Colombia	Mihaela Cambei; Romania
53 kg	Sabina Baltag; Romania	Kely Junkar; Colombia	Nur Vinatasari; Indonesia
58 kg	Ghofrane Belkhir; Tunisia	Neama Said Fahmi Said; Egypt	Peyton Brown; United States
63 kg	Kumushkhon Fayzullaeva; Uzbekistan	Thipwara Chontavin; Thailand	Galya Shatova; Bulgaria
+63 kg^{[a]}	Dilara Narin; Turkey	Dolera Davronova; Uzbekistan	Kanah Andrews-Nahu; New Zealand

==== Notes ====
- ^{Girls' +63 kg} Supatchanin Khamhaeng of Thailand originally won the gold medal, but was disqualified in 2019 after testing positive for a banned substance.
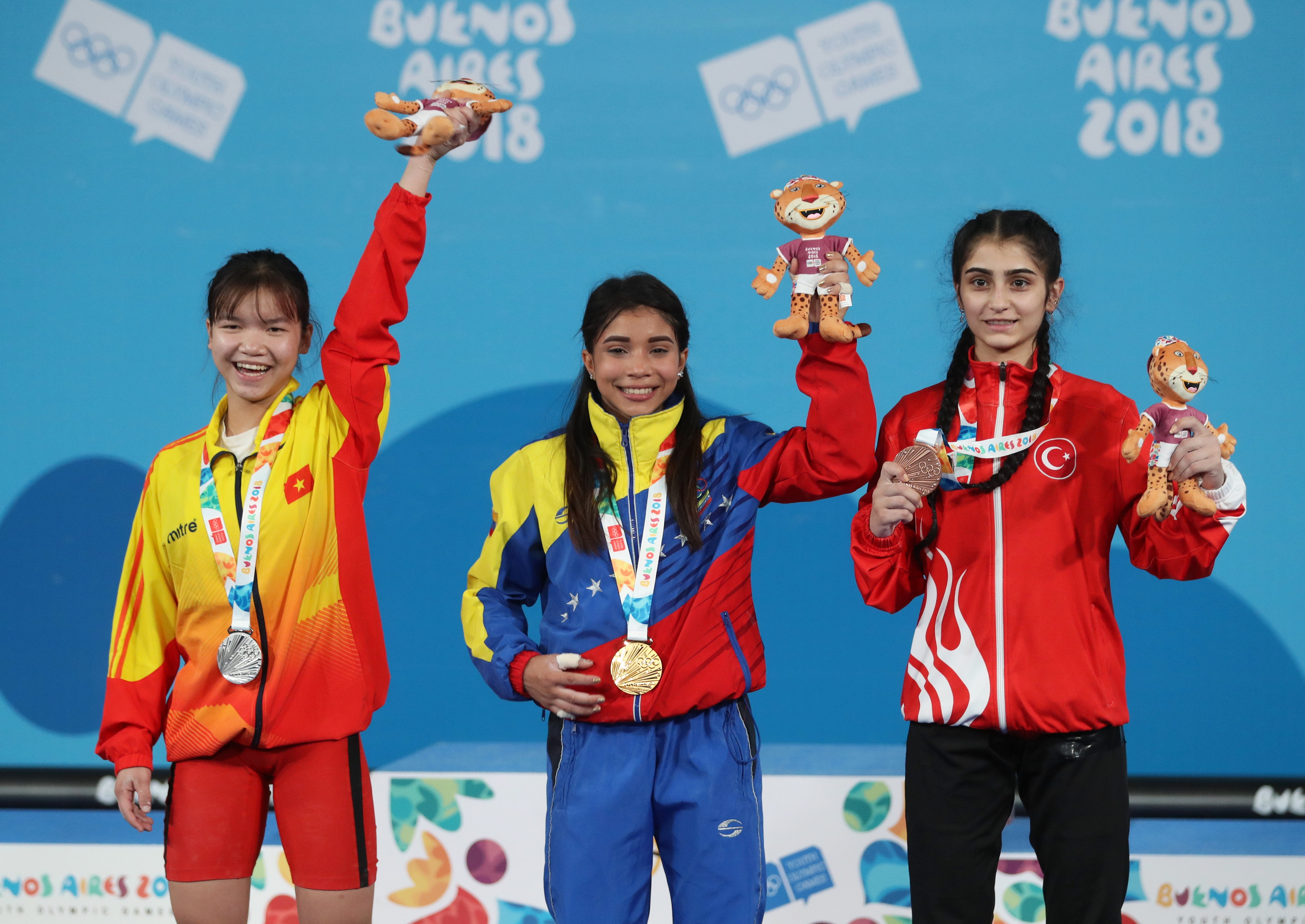
44 kg victory ceremony

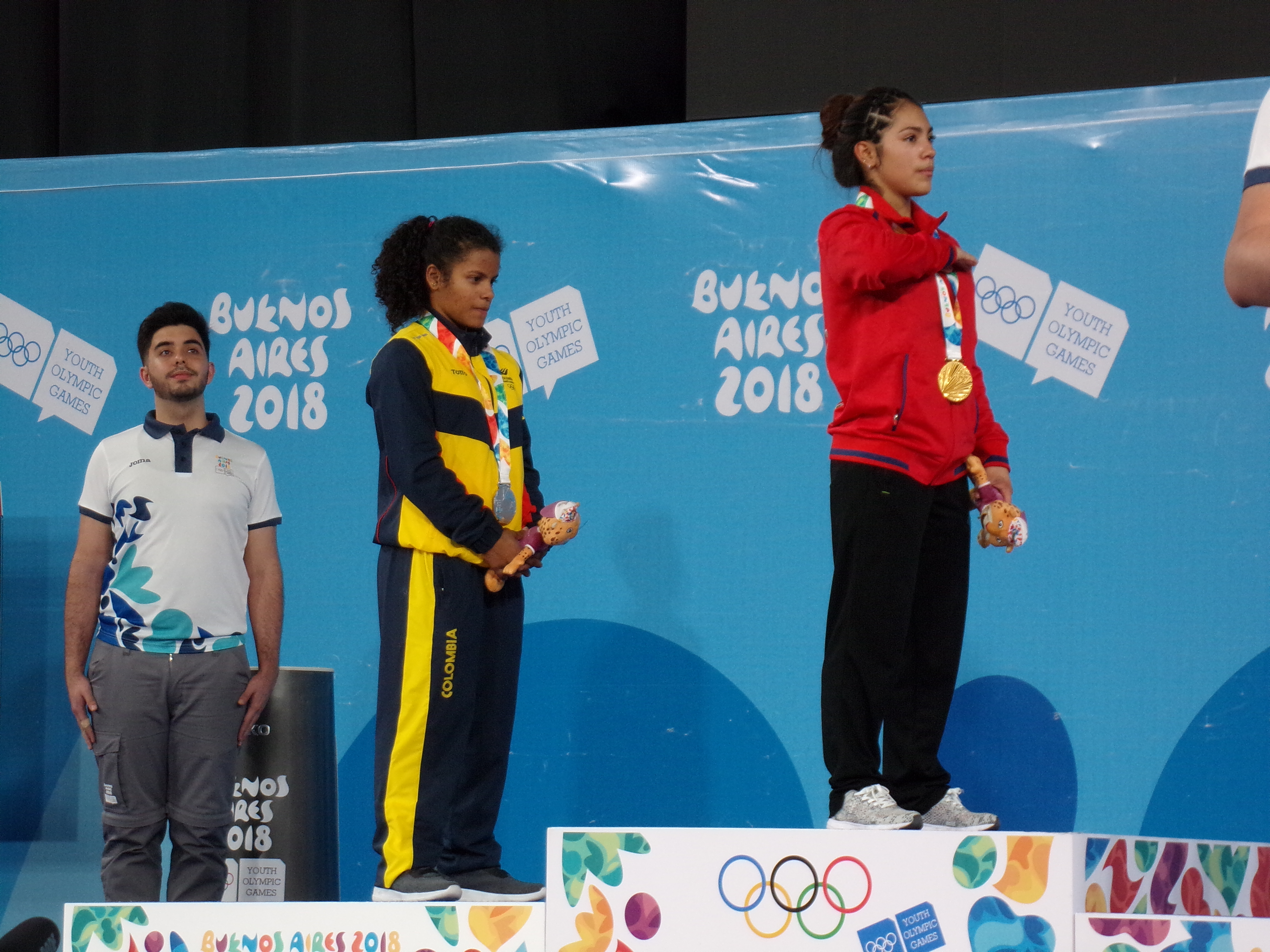
48 kg victory ceremony

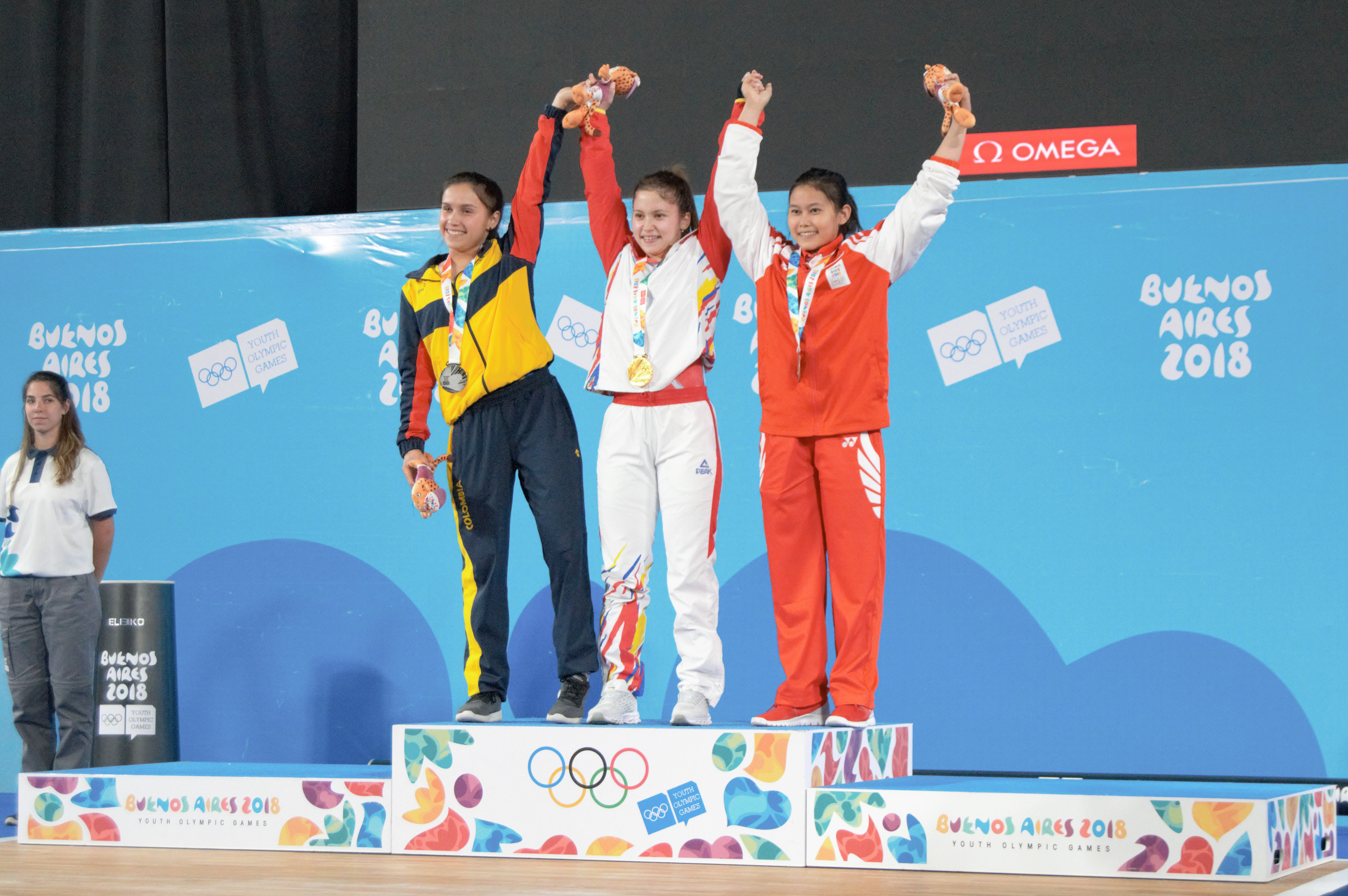
53 kg victory ceremony

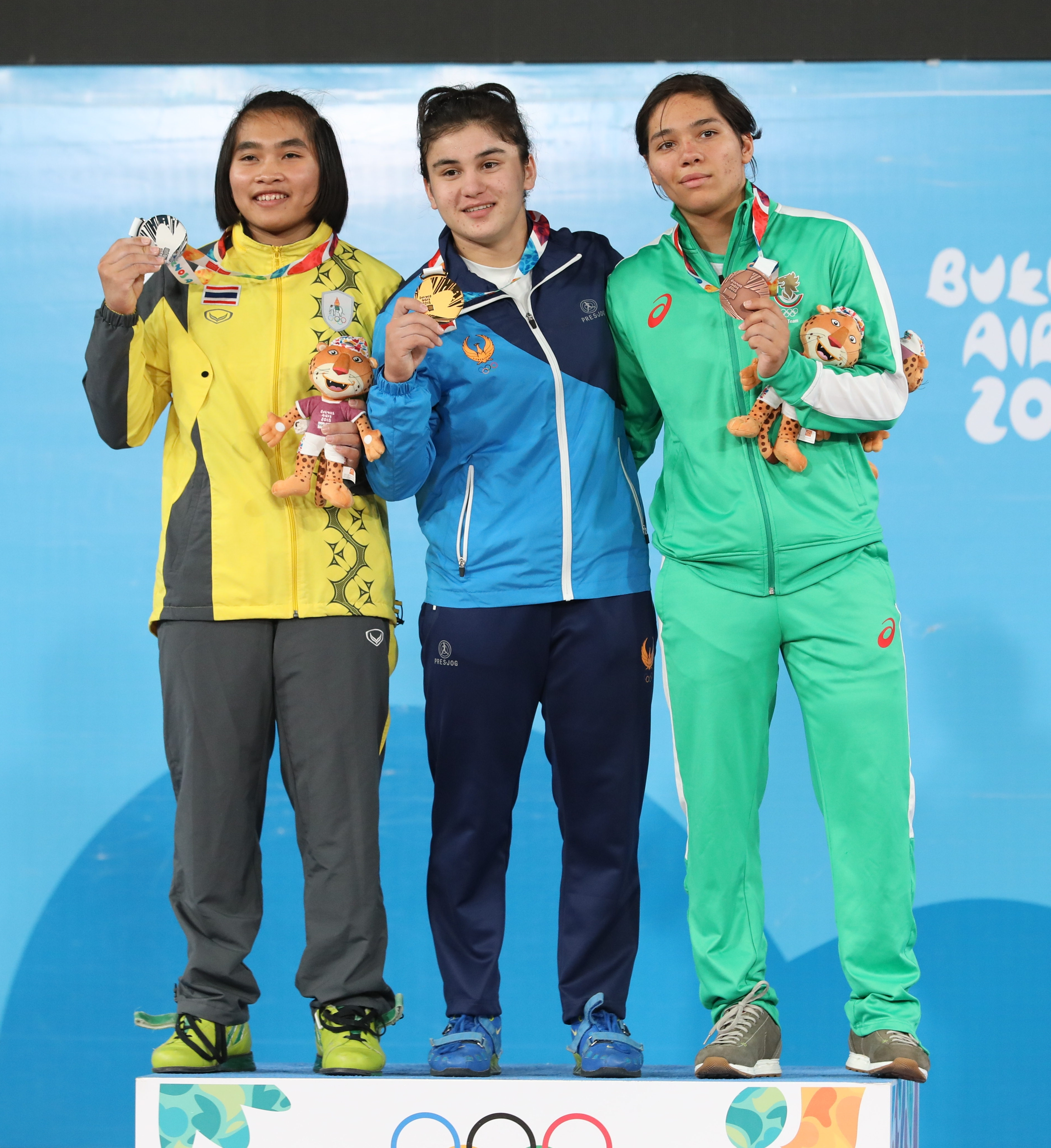
63 kg victory ceremony
