= Wrestling at the 2018 Summer Youth Olympics =

Wrestling at the III Summer Youth Olympic Games
- Venue: Asia Pavilion
- Dates: 12–14 October
- No. of events: 15 (10 boys, 5 girls)

Wrestling at the 2018 Summer Youth Olympics was held from 12 to 14 October. The events took place at the Asia Pavilion in Buenos Aires, Argentina.

== Qualification ==
Each National Olympic Committee (NOC) can enter a maximum of 6 competitors, 2 in Boys' Freestyle, 2 in Boys' Greco-Roman and 2 in Girls' Freestyle. As hosts, Argentina was given 3 quotas, one in each discipline should they participate in the Cadet Pan American Championships. A further 12, 8 male and 4 female athletes were decided by the Tripartite Commission. The remaining 95 athletes, 50 male and 45 female qualified over five continental qualification tournaments. For the boys’ events, each continent qualified 1 athlete while for the girls’ events the top 3 Europeans, top 2 Asians and Pan Americans and the top African and Oceanian athletes qualified.

To be eligible to participate at the Youth Olympics athletes must have been born between 1 January 2001 and 31 December 2003.

=== Qualification Timeline ===
Event	Location	Date
2018 Africa Cadet Championships	(Nigeria) Port Harcourt	7–11 February 2018
2018 Asia Cadet Championships	(Uzbekistan) Tashkent	10–13 May 2018
2018 Europe Cadet Championships	(North Macedonia) Skopje	14–20 May 2018
2018 Oceania Cadet Championships	(Guam) Yigo	18-20 May 2018
2018 Pan America Cadet Championships	Guatemala City	25–27 May 2018

=== Qualification Summary ===
NOC	Boys' Freestyle					Boys' Greco-Roman					Girls' Freestyle					Total
NOC	-48 kg	-55 kg	-65 kg	-80 kg	-110 kg	-45 kg	-51 kg	-60 kg	-71 kg	-92 kg	-43 kg	-49 kg	-57 kg	-65 kg	-73 kg	Total
Algeria		X		X				X								3
Argentina		X					X								X	3
Armenia								X								1
American Samoa										X					X	2
Australia					X											1
Azerbaijan			X								X					2
Belarus												X			X	2
Brazil										X	X					2
Bulgaria						X										1
Cambodia												X				1
Cameroon													X	X		2
Canada				X											X	2
China														X		1
Colombia	X								X							2
Cuba														X	X	2
Ecuador						X										1
Egypt			X		X	X				X	X		X			6
Estonia														X		1
Federated States of Micronesia				X												1
France											X					1
Georgia	X						X	X								3
Germany													X			1
Guam		X							X			X	X			4
Honduras						X										1
Hungary												X	X			2
India											X		X			2
Iran			X		X	X				X						4
Japan		X					X		X				X		X	5
Kazakhstan												X				1
Kyrgyzstan								X								1
Macedonia					X											1
Marshall Islands							X									1
Mexico					X		X	X					X	X		5
Moldova									X		X		X			3
Mongolia											X			X		2
Morocco												X				1
Nauru	X															1
New Zealand			X	X				X			X					4
Nigeria											X			X		2
Pakistan			X													1
Romania														X		1
Russia				X	X				X	X						4
South Africa	X															1
Sweden												X			X	2
Tunisia							X		X					X	X	4
Turkey	X									X					X	3
Turkmenistan						X										1
United States		X	X								X	X				4
Ukraine		X												X		2
Uzbekistan	X			X								X			X	4
Venezuela												X	X			2
51 NOCs	6	6	6	6	6	6	6	6	6	6	10	10	10	10	10	110

== Medal summary ==
=== Medal table ===
* Host nation (Argentina)

Rank	Nation	Gold	Silver	Bronze	Total
1	Iran	2	2	0	4
2	Russia	2	1	1	4
3	Japan	2	0	2	4
4	United States	2	0	0	2
5	Georgia	1	2	0	3
6	Uzbekistan	1	1	1	3
7	Azerbaijan	1	0	1	2
8	China	1	0	0	1
8	Cuba	1	0	0	1
8	Moldova	1	0	0	1
8	Sweden	1	0	0	1
12	Argentina*	0	2	0	2
13	Turkey	0	1	1	2
13	Ukraine	0	1	1	2
15	Algeria	0	1	0	1
15	Ecuador	0	1	0	1
15	Hungary	0	1	0	1
15	India	0	1	0	1
15	Kyrgyzstan	0	1	0	1
20	Armenia	0	0	1	1
20	Belarus	0	0	1	1
20	Bulgaria	0	0	1	1
20	Egypt	0	0	1	1
20	Germany	0	0	1	1
20	Mexico	0	0	1	1
20	Mongolia	0	0	1	1
20	Pakistan	0	0	1	1
Totals (27 entries)		15	15	15	45

=== Boy's events ===
==== Freestyle ====
Event	Gold	Silver	Bronze
48 kg	Umidjon Jalolov; Uzbekistan	Giorgi Gegelashvili; Georgia	Halil Gökdeniz; Turkey
55 kg	Robert Howard; United States	Hernán Almendra; Argentina	Vladyslav Ostapenko; Ukraine
65 kg	Turan Bayramov; Azerbaijan	Mohammad Karimi; Iran	Inayat Ullah; Pakistan
80 kg	Akhmedkhan Tembotov; Russia	Fateh Benferdjallah; Algeria	Mukhammadrasul Rakhimov; Uzbekistan
110 kg	Sergey Kozyrev; Russia	Amir Hossein Zare; Iran	Ahmed Mahmoud Khalil; Egypt

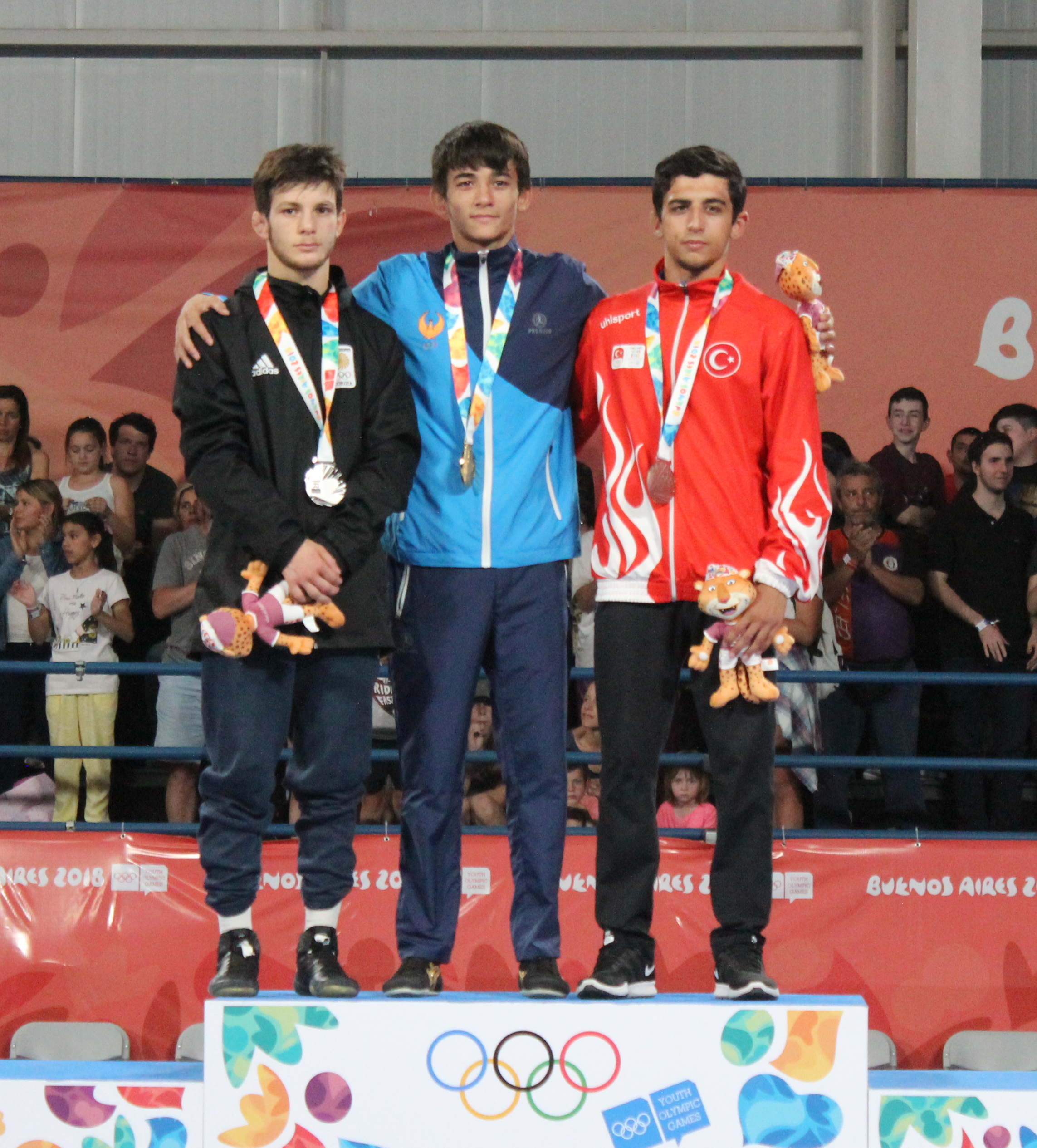
48 kg

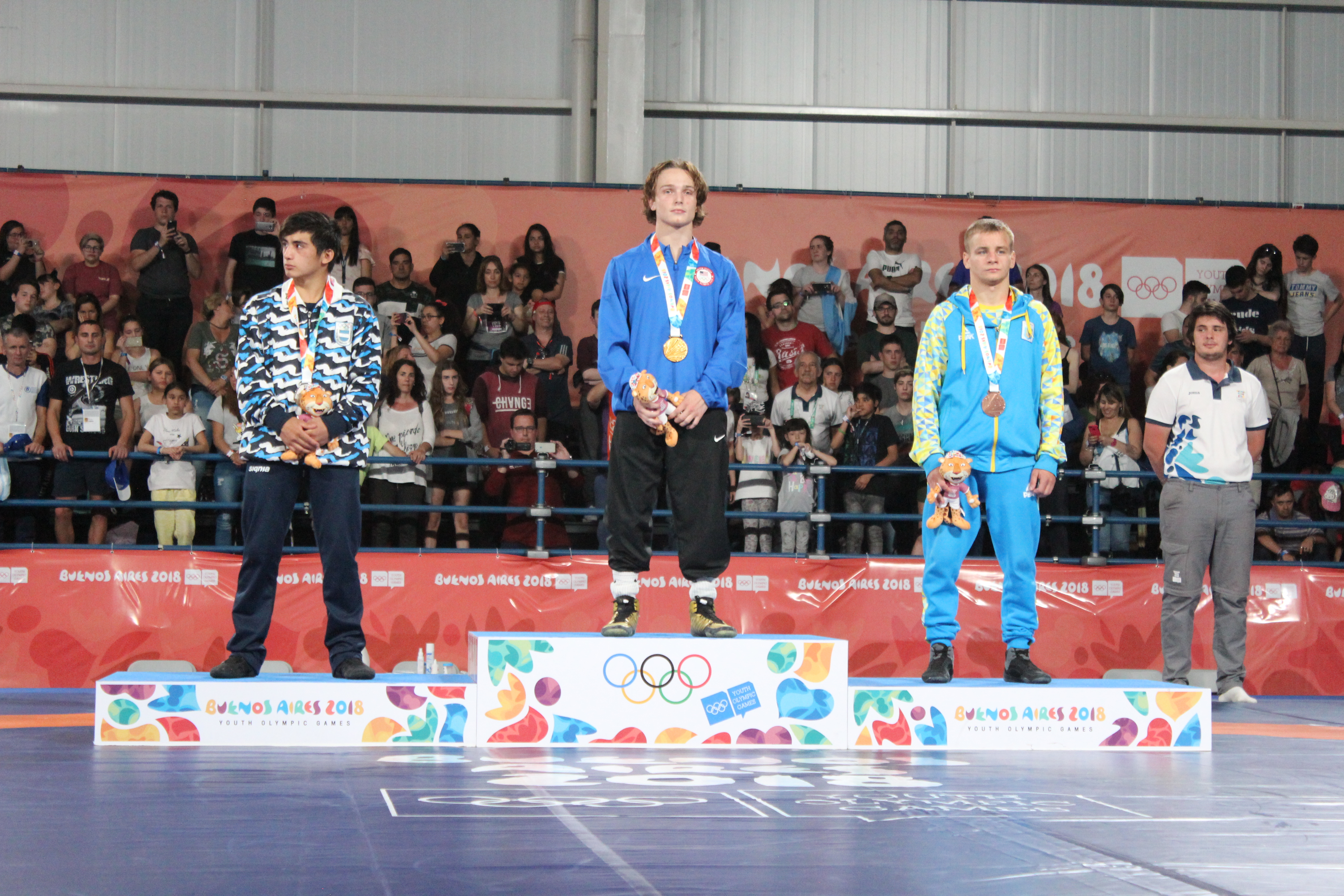
55 kg

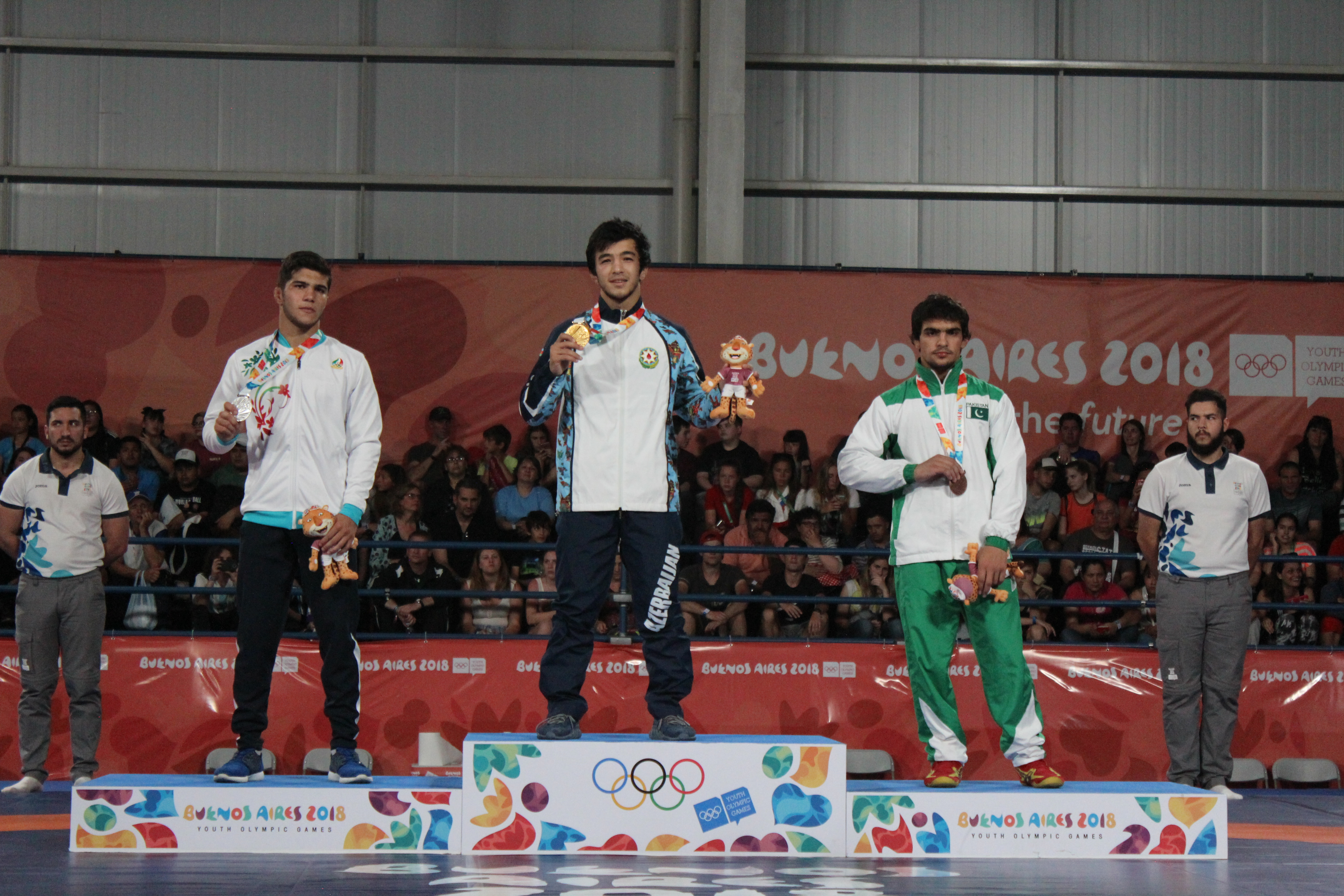
65 kg

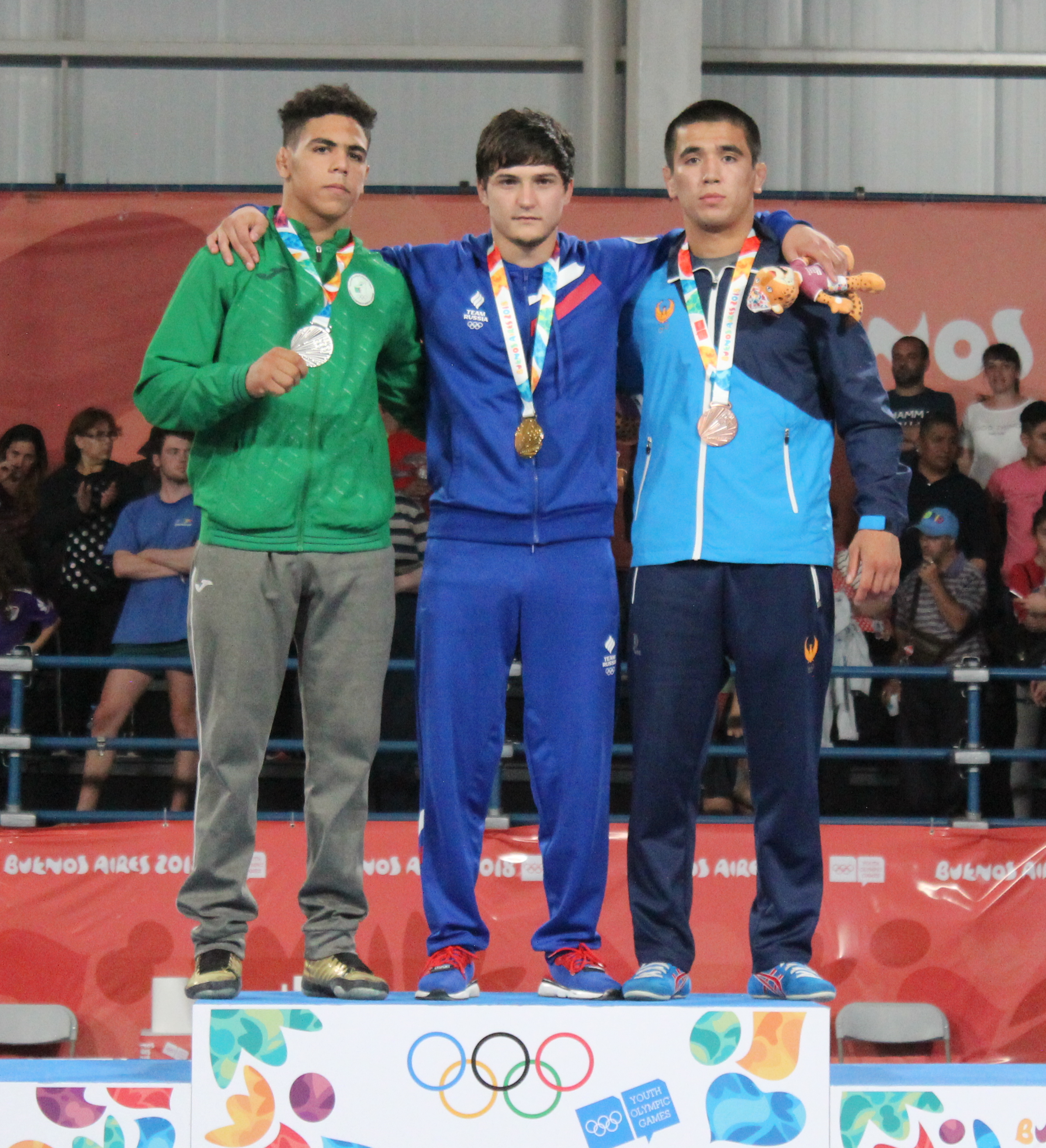
80 kg

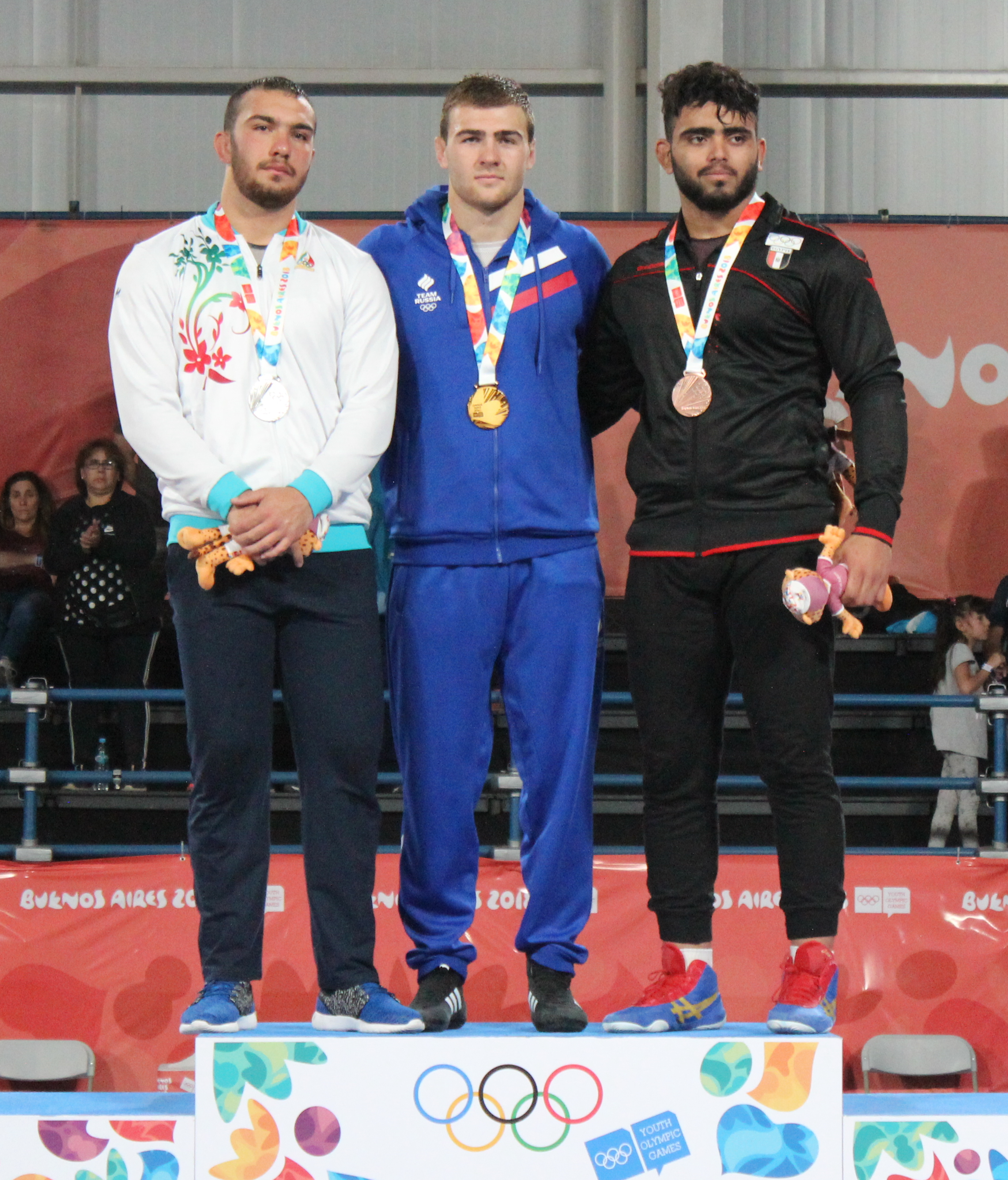
110 kg

==== Greco-Roman ====
Event	Gold	Silver	Bronze
45 kg	Amir Reza Dehbozorgi; Iran	Jeremy Peralta; Ecuador	Edmond Nazaryan; Bulgaria
51 kg	Wataru Sasaki; Japan	Giorgi Tokhadze; Georgia	Axel Salas; Mexico
60 kg	Giorgi Chkhikvadze; Georgia	Elmirbek Sadyrov; Kyrgyzstan	Sahak Hovhannisyan; Armenia
71 kg	Alexandrin Guțu; Moldova	Stepan Starodubtsev; Russia	Shu Yamada; Japan
92 kg	Mohammad Nosrati; Iran	Osman Ayaydın; Turkey	Mukhammad Evloev; Russia

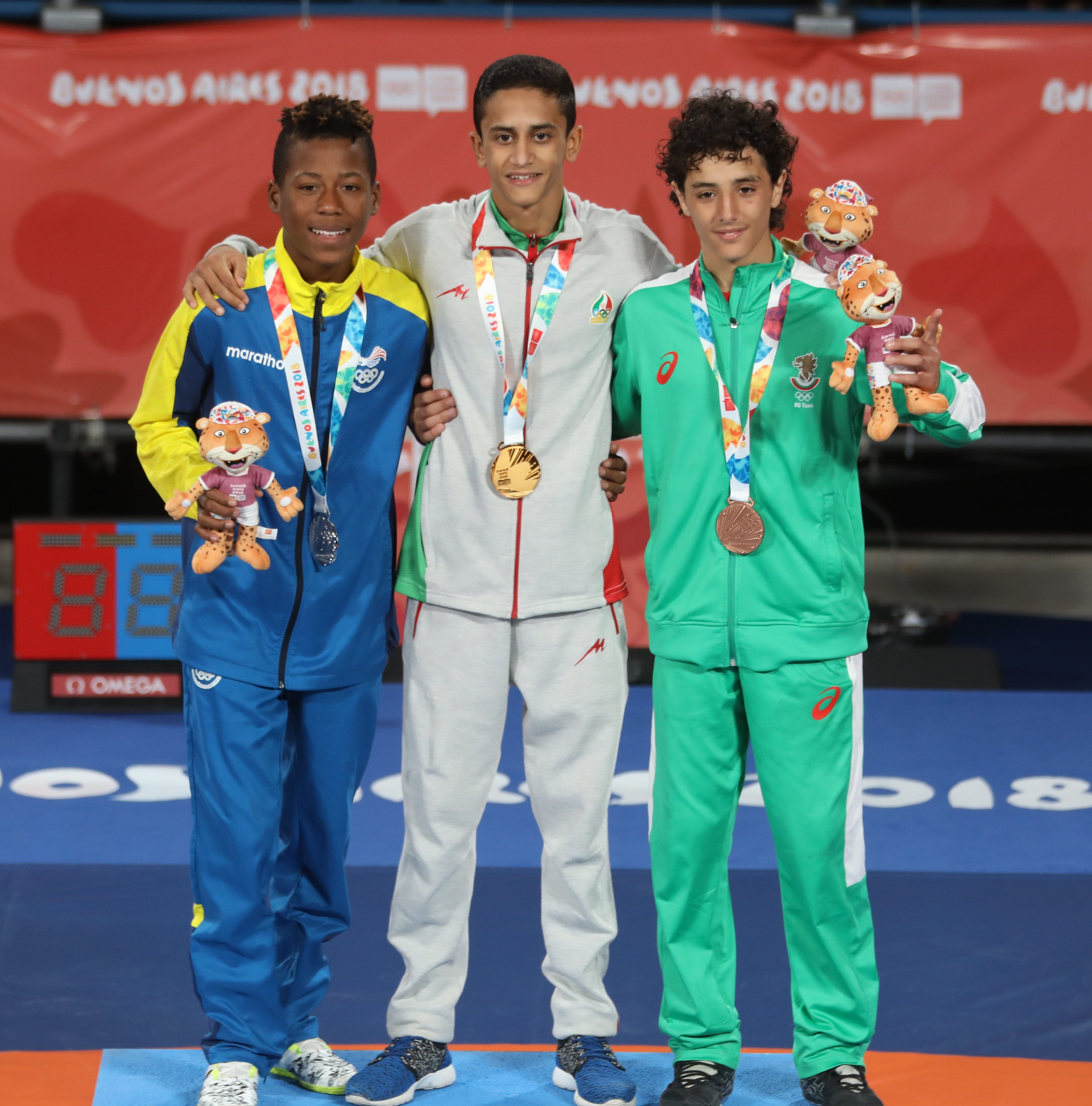
45 kg

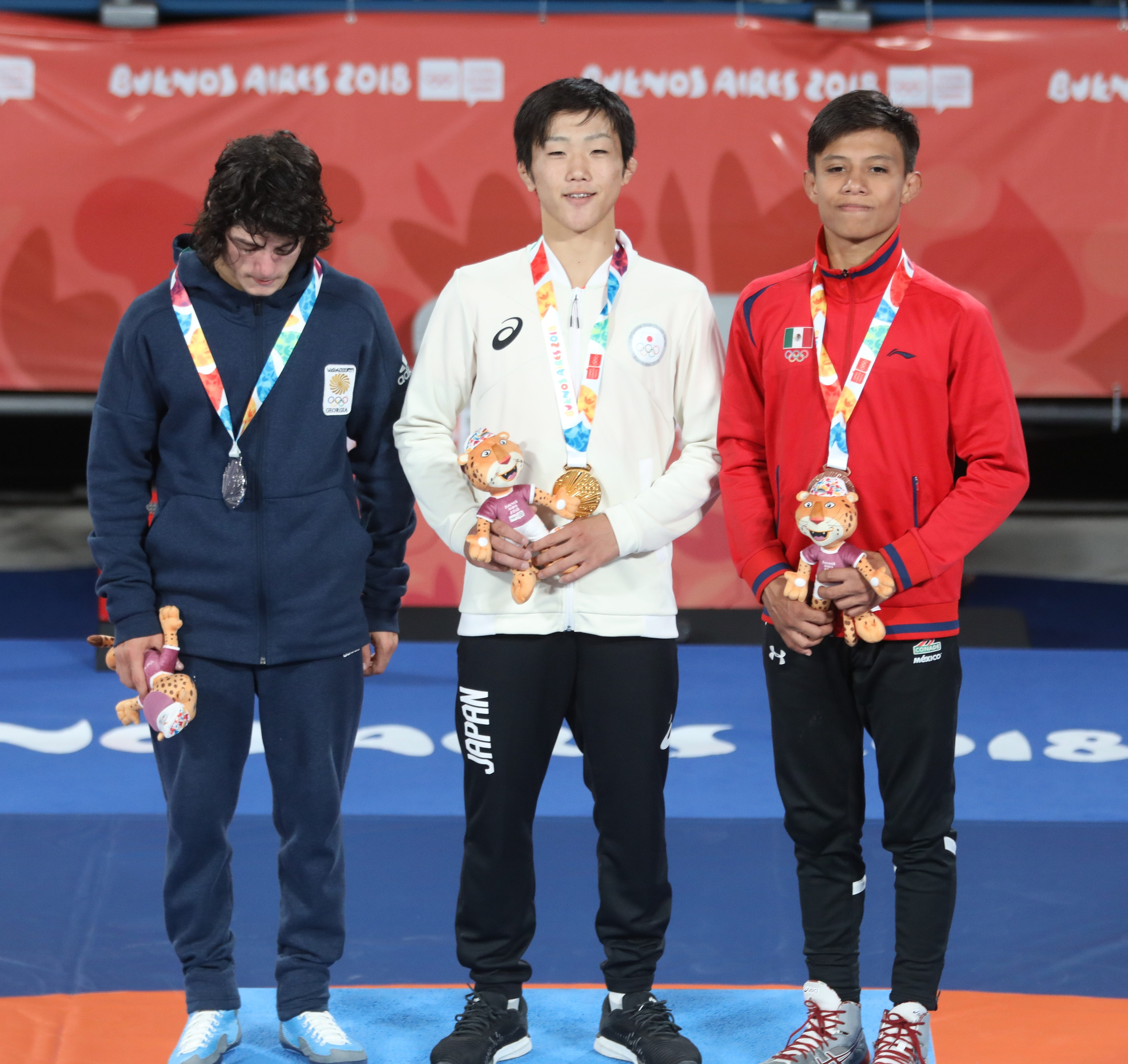
51 kg

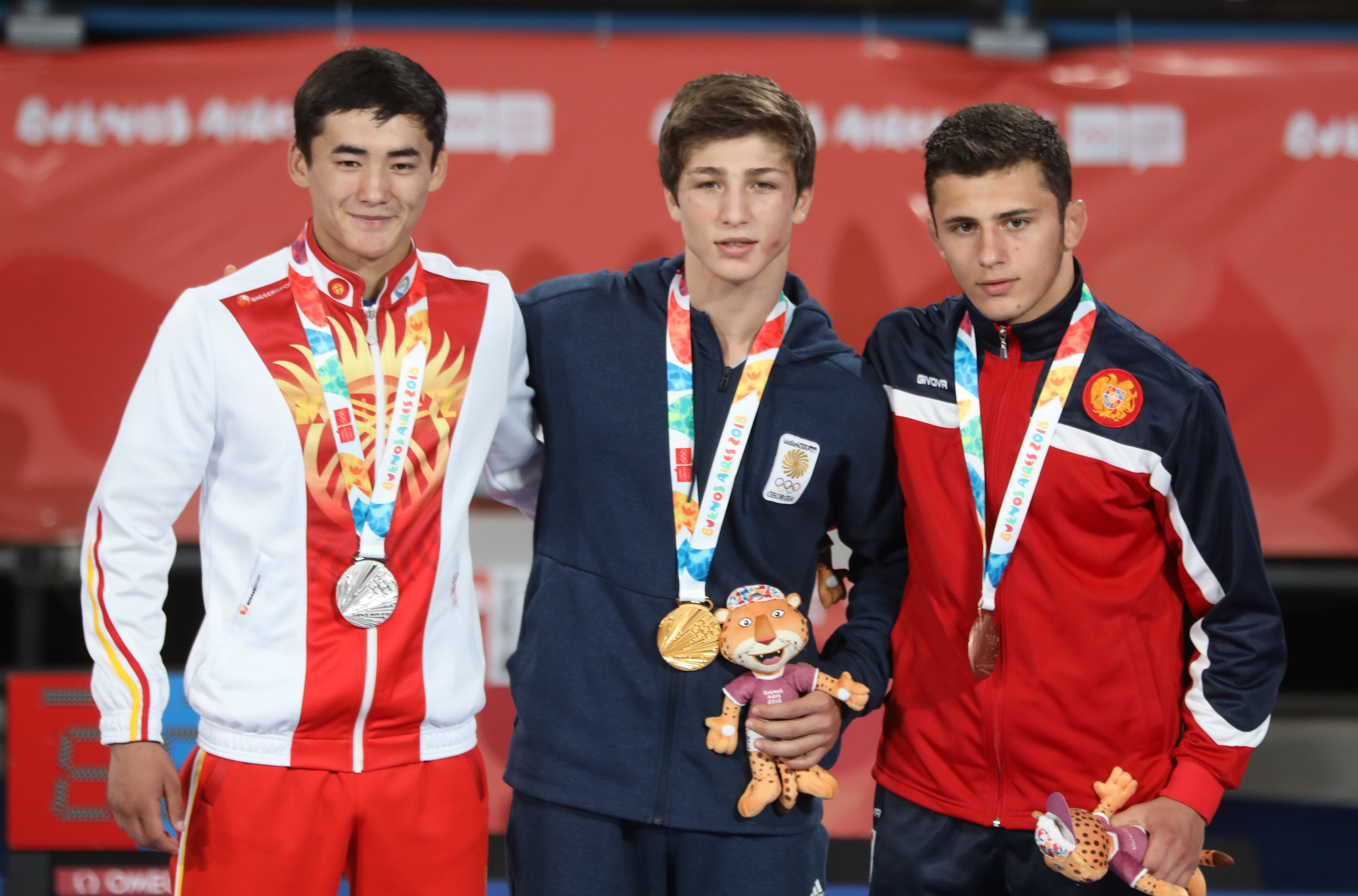
60 kg

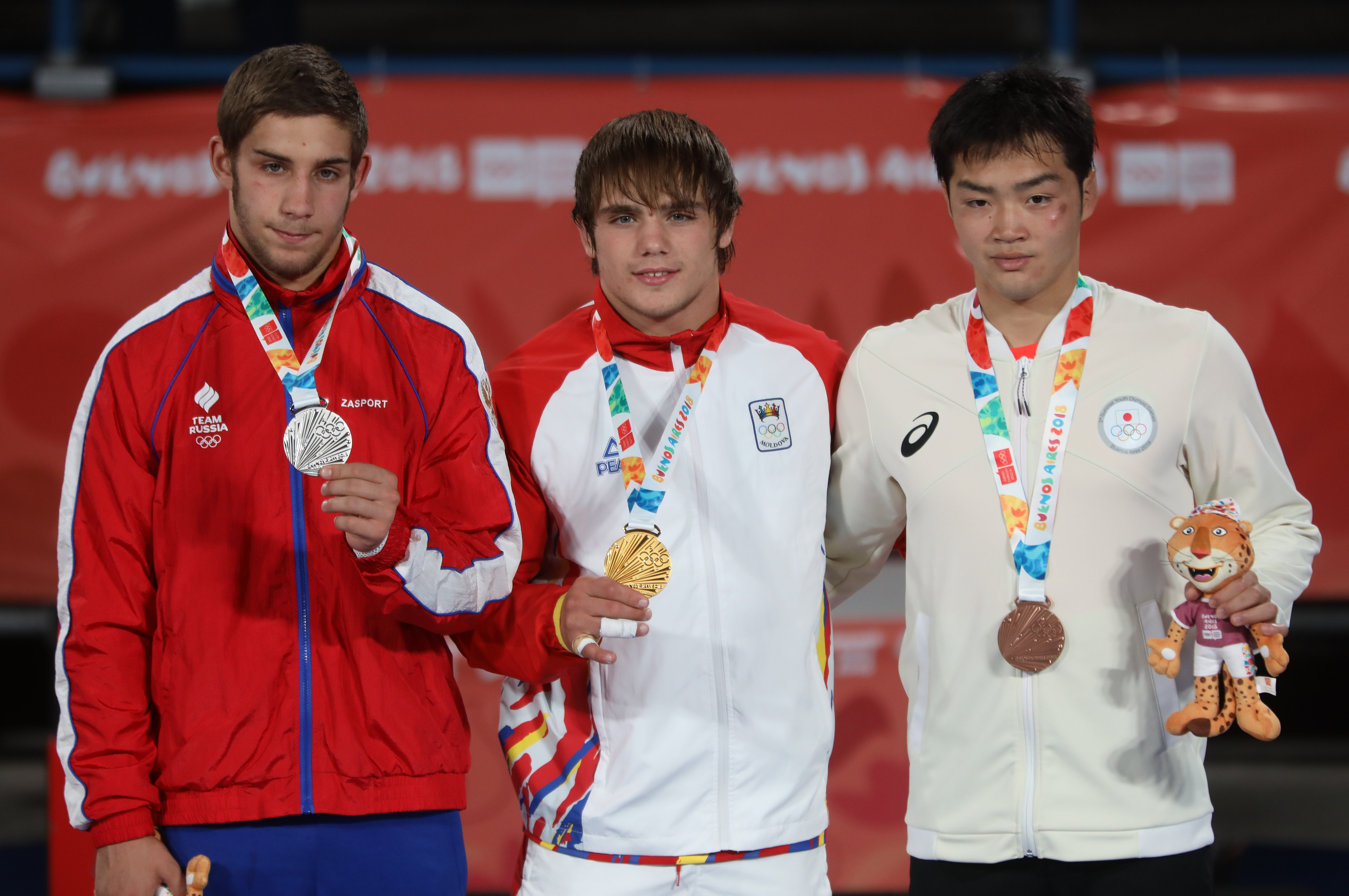
71 kg

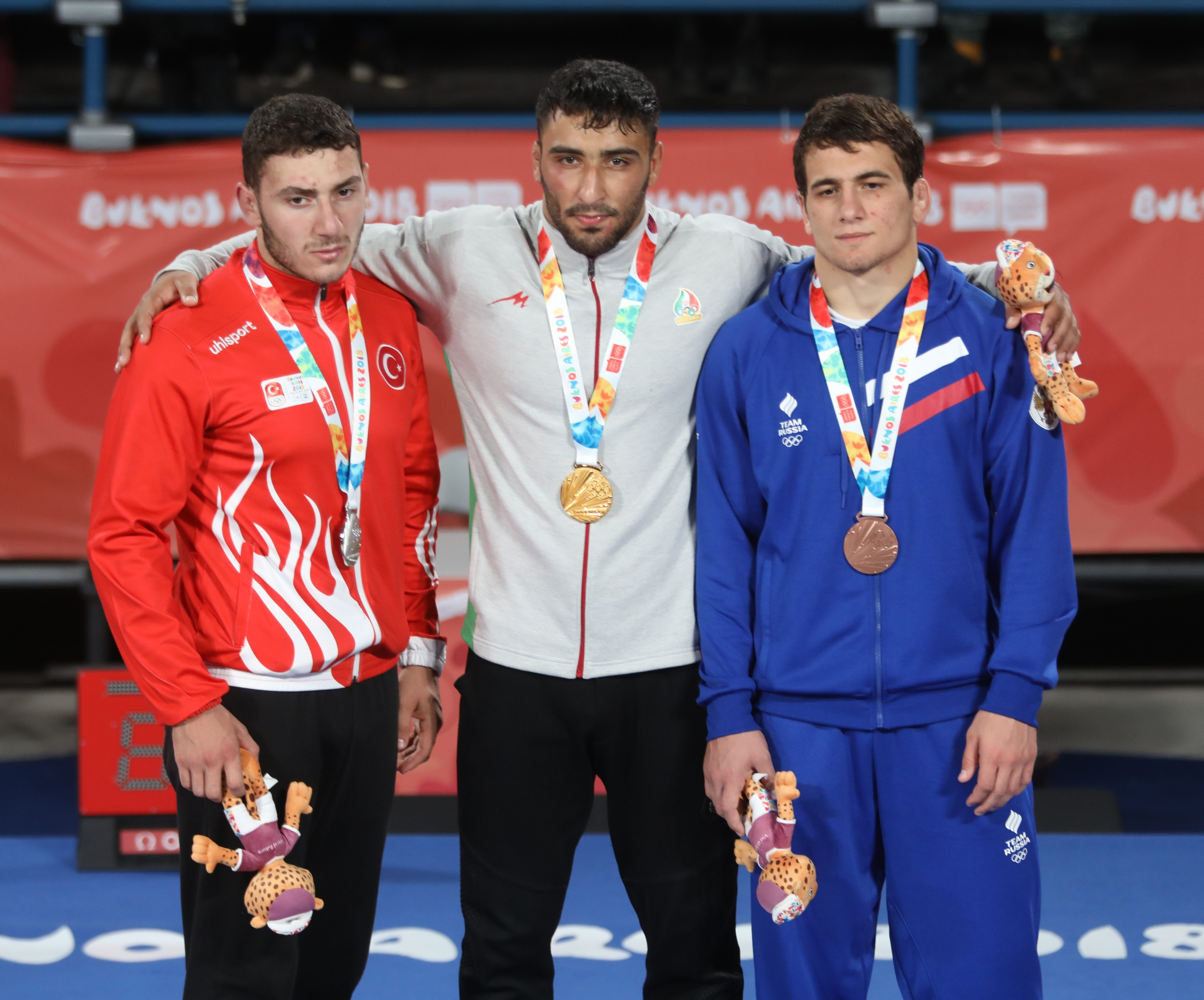
92 kg

=== Girl's events ===
==== Freestyle ====
Event	Gold	Silver	Bronze
43 kg	Emily Shilson; United States	Simran Kaur; India	Shahana Nazarova; Azerbaijan
49 kg	Jonna Malmgren; Sweden	Shokhida Akhmedova; Uzbekistan	Natallia Varakina; Belarus
57 kg	Nonoka Ozaki; Japan	Anna Szél; Hungary	Anastasia Blayvas; Germany
65 kg	Zhou Xinru; China	Oksana Chudyk; Ukraine	Oyun-Erdene Tamir; Mongolia
73 kg	Milaimys Marín; Cuba	Linda Machuca; Argentina	Yuka Kagami; Japan
