= Georgia at the 2018 Summer Youth Olympics =

- IOC code: GEO
- NOC: Georgian National Olympic Committee
- Website: www.geonoc.org.ge

in Buenos Aires, Argentina 6 – 18 October 2018
- Competitors: 15 in 10 sports
- Medals Ranked 45th: Gold 1 Silver 4 Bronze 1 Total 6

Summer Youth Olympics appearances
- 2010; 2014; 2018

Georgia participated at the 2018 Summer Youth Olympics in Buenos Aires, Argentina from 6 October to 18 October 2018.

== Medals ==
Medals awarded to participants of mixed-NOC (combined) teams are represented in italics. These medals are not counted towards the individual NOC medal tally.

Medal	Name	Sport	Event	Date
Gold	Giorgi Chkhikvadze	Wrestling	Boys' Greco-Roman −60kg	12 October
Silver	Ilia Sulamanidze	Judo	Boys' 100 kg	9 October
Silver	Archil Malakmadze	Weightlifting	Boys' 69 kg	9 October
Silver	Giorgi Tokhadze	Wrestling	Boys' Greco-Roman −51kg	12 October
Silver	Giorgi Gegelashvili	Wrestling	Boys' freestyle −48kg	14 October
Bronze	Nino Khutsiberidze	Shooting	Girls' 10 metre air pistol	9 October

== Basketball ==
Georgia qualified a boys' team based on the U18 3x3 National Federation Ranking.

- Boys' tournament - 1 team of 4 athletes

Event	Group stage					Quarterfinal	Semifinal	Final / BM	
Event	Opposition Score	Opposition Score	Opposition Score	Opposition Score	Rank	Opposition Score	Opposition Score	Opposition Score	Rank
Boys' tournament	Slovenia; L W/O	China; W 15-10	Turkmenistan; W 20-9	Jordan; W 21-4	2	Argentina; L 12-21	did not advance		6

== Gymnastics ==
=== Rhythmic gymnastics ===
Georgia qualified one rhythmic gymnast based on its performance at the European qualification event.

- Girls' rhythmic individual all-around - 1 quota

== Judo ==
Individual

Athlete	Event	Round of 16	Quarterfinals	Semifinals	Rep 1	Rep 2	Rep 3	Final / BM	
Athlete	Event	Opposition Result	Opposition Result	Opposition Result	Opposition Result	Opposition Result	Opposition Result	Opposition Result	Rank
Ilia Sulamanidze	Boys' 100 kg	Rok Pogorevc (SLO); W 10-00s1	Joaquín Burgos (ARG); W 10s1-00s1	Ömer Aydın (TUR); W 01s1-00s1	Bye			Bekarys Saduakas (KAZ); L 00s2-01s2	2nd place, silver medalist(s)

Team

Athletes	Event	Round of 16	Quarterfinals	Semifinals	Final	Rank
Athletes	Event	Opposition Result	Opposition Result	Opposition Result	Opposition Result	Rank
Team Singapore; Ahad Al-Sagheer (YEM); Anastasia Balaban (UKR); Bryan Garboa (ECU); Sarah Kafufula (COD); Mariem Khlifi (TUN); Ahmed Mohamed Fahmy (EGY); Eduarda Rosa (BRA); Ilia Sulamanidze (GEO)	Mixed Team	Team Moscow (MIX); L 3–4	did not advance			

== Shooting ==
Georgia qualified one sport shooter based on its performance at the 2018 European Championships.

Athlete	Event	Qualification		Final	
Athlete	Event	Points	Rank	Points	Rank
Nino Khutsiberidze	Girls' 10 metre air pistol	565-13x	4 Q	214.6	3rd place, bronze medalist(s)

Team

Athletes	Event	Qualification		Round of 16	Quarterfinals	Semifinals	Final / BM	Rank
Athletes	Event	Points	Rank	Opposition Result	Opposition Result	Opposition Result	Opposition Result	Rank
Nino Khutsiberidze (GEO); Brian Wai Kuk Ng (CAN)	Mixed Team 10m Air Pistol	740-17x	11Q	Rueda Vargas (COL); Karstedt (GER); L 7–10	did not advance			12

== Taekwondo ==
Athlete	Event	Round of 16	Quarterfinals	Semifinals	Final	
Athlete	Event	Opposition Result	Opposition Result	Opposition Result	Opposition Result	Rank
Zurab Kintsurashvili	Boys' −48 kg	Bye	Im Seong-bin (KOR); L 11-30	did not advance		

== Tennis ==
Athlete	Event	Round of 32	Round of 16	Quarterfinals	Semifinals	Final / BM
Athlete	Event	Opposition Score	Opposition Score	Opposition Score	Opposition Score	Opposition Score
Ana Makatsaria	Girls' singles	S Zünd (LIE); L (5-7, 3-6)	did not advance			
G Drummy (IRL); A Makatsaria (GEO)	Girls' doubles	—	Y Naito (JPN); N Sato (JPN); L (1-6, 5-7)	did not advance		
A Makatsaria (GEO); P Sydow (ARU)	Mixed doubles	Y Naito (JPN); N Tajima (JPN); L (0-6, 1-6)	did not advance			

== Weightlifting ==
Athlete	Event	Snatch		Clean & jerk		Total	Rank
Athlete	Event	Result	Rank	Result	Rank	Total	Rank
Archil Malakmadze	Boys' 69 kg	134	2	154	4	288	2nd place, silver medalist(s)

== Wrestling ==
Key:
- VFA – Victory by Fall
- VSU – Without any point(s) scored by the opponent
- VSU1 – With point(s) scored by the opponent
- VPO1 – With point(s) scored by the opponent

Athlete	Event	Group stage			Final / RM	Rank
Athlete	Event	Opposition Score	Opposition Score	Rank	Opposition Score	Rank
Giorgi Tokhadze	Boys' Greco-Roman −51kg	Lovera (ARG); W 6 – 0 ^{VFA}	Adiniwin (MHL); W 8 – 0 ^{VSU}	1 Q	Sasaki (JPN); L 7 – 11 ^{VPO1}	2nd place, silver medalist(s)
Giorgi Chkhikvadze	Boys' Greco-Roman −60kg	Hovhannisyan (ARM); W 3 – 1 ^{VPO1}	Merikhi (ALG); W 13 – 3 ^{VSU1}	1 Q	Sadyrov (KGZ); W 9 – 0 ^{VSU}	1st place, gold medalist(s)
Giorgi Gegelashvili	Boys' freestyle −48kg	Zuluaga (COL); W 12 – 1 ^{VSU1}	Detudamo (NRU); W 10 – 0 ^{VSU}	1 Q	Jalolov (UZB); L 2 – 8 ^{VPO1}	2nd place, silver medalist(s)
