= Wrestling at the 2018 Summer Youth Olympics – Boys' Greco-Roman 51 kg =

Boys' Greco-Roman 51kg at the III Summer Youth Olympic Games
- Venue: Asia Pavilion
- Date: 12 October
- Competitors: 6 from 6 nations

Medalists
1st place, gold medalist(s)		Wataru Sasaki	Japan
2nd place, silver medalist(s)		Giorgi Tokhadze	Georgia
3rd place, bronze medalist(s)		Axel Salas	Mexico

The Boys' Greco-Roman 51 kg competition at the 2018 Summer Youth Olympics was held on 12 October at the Asia Pavilion.

== Competition format ==
As there were less than six wrestlers in a weight category, the pool phase will be run as a single group competing in a round robin format. Ranking within the groups is used to determine the pairings for the final phase.

== Schedule ==
All times are in local time (UTC-3).

Date	Time	Round
Friday, 12 October 2018	10:05; 10:30; 10:55; 17:15	Round 1 Round 2 Round 3 Finals

== Results ==
Legend

- F — Won by fall

Group Stages

Qualified for the Gold Medal Match
Qualified for the Bronze Medal Match
Qualified for the 5th/6th Place Match

Group A

Pos	Athlete	Pld	W	L	CP	TP	Qualification
1	Wataru Sasaki (JPN)	2	2	0	8	19	Gold-medal match
2	Axel Salas (MEX)	2	1	1	4	11	Bronze-medal match
3	Mehdi Jouini (TUN)	2	0	2	1	8	Classification 5th/6th place match

Source: UWW

	Score		CP
Wataru Sasaki (JPN)	9–0	Mehdi Jouini (TUN)	4–0 VSU
Axel Salas (MEX)	1–10	Wataru Sasaki (JPN)	1–4 VSU1
Mehdi Jouini (TUN)	8–10	Axel Salas (MEX)	1–3 VPO1

Group B

Pos	Athlete	Pld	W	L	CP	TP	Qualification
1	Giorgi Tokhadze (GEO)	2	2	0	9	14	Gold-medal match
2	Eduardo Lovera (ARG)	2	1	1	5	4	Bronze-medal match
3	Alexander Adiniwin (MHL)	2	0	2	0	0	Classification 5th/6th place match

Source: UWW

	Score		CP
Eduardo Lovera (ARG)	4–0 Fall	Alexander Adiniwin (MHL)	5–0 VFA
Giorgi Tokhadze (GEO)	6–0 Fall	Eduardo Lovera (ARG)	5–0 VFA
Alexander Adiniwin (MHL)	0–8	Giorgi Tokhadze (GEO)	0–4 VSU

=== Finals ===
Gold medal match
Wataru Sasaki (JPN)	11
Giorgi Tokhadze (GEO)	7

Bronze medal match
Axel Salas (MEX)	5
Eduardo Lovera (ARG)	3

Classification 5th/6th place match
Mehdi Jouini (TUN)	2^{F}
Alexander Adiniwin (MHL)	0

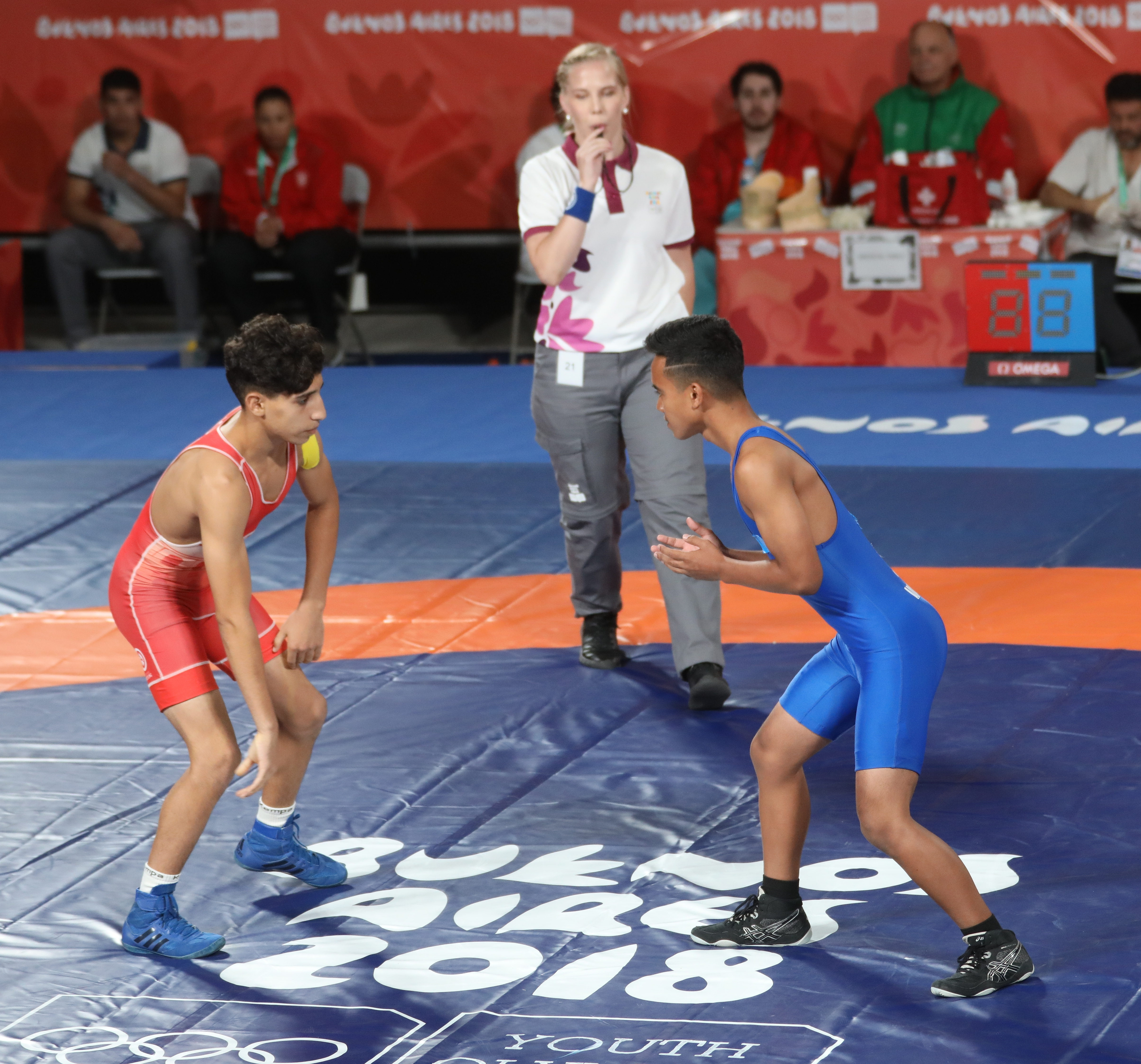
Classification 5th/6th Place Match: Mehdi Jouini (left) vs. Alexander Adiniwin

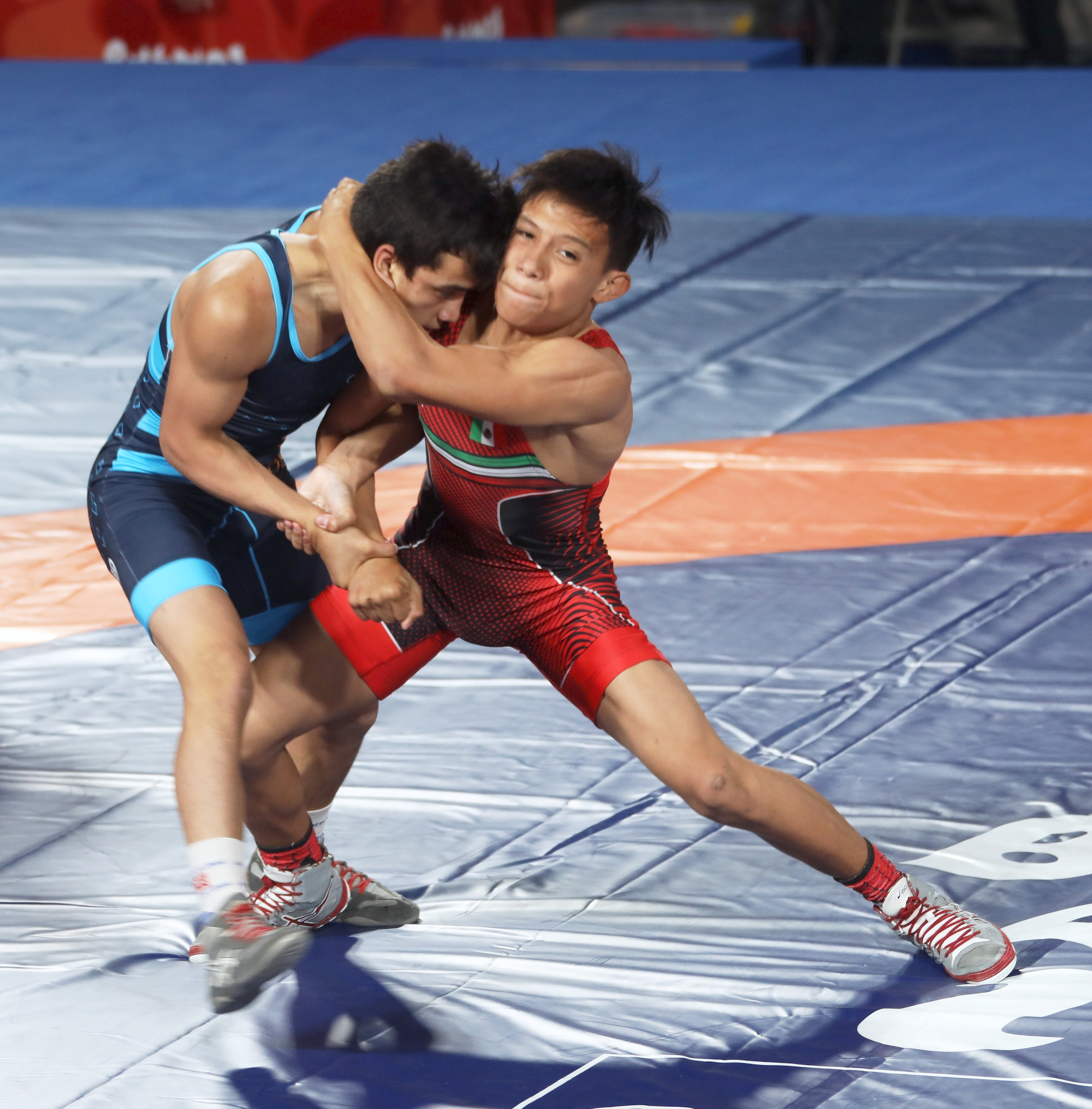
Bronze Medal Match: Axel Salas (right) vs. Eduardo Lovera

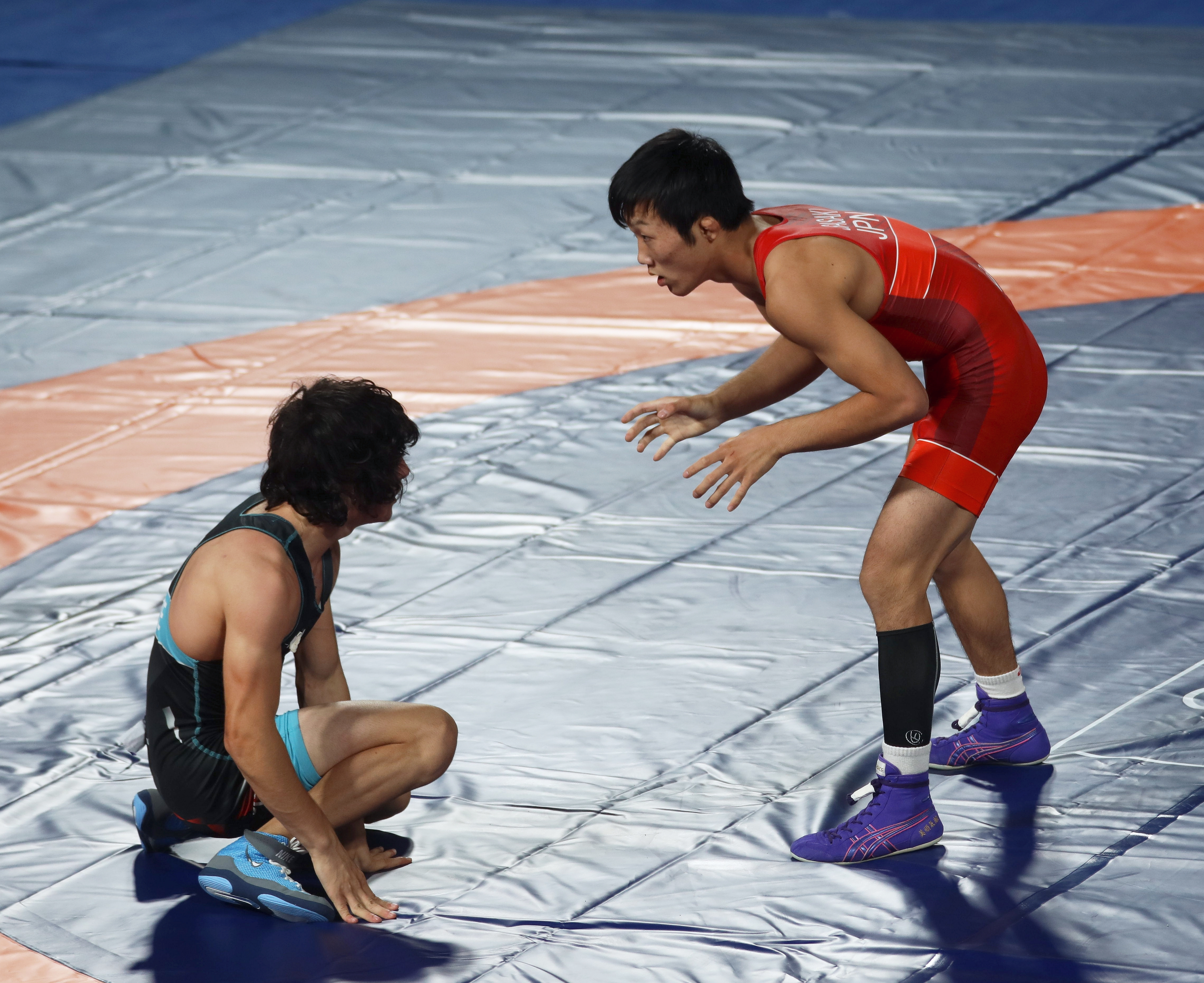
Gold Medal Match: Wataru Sasaki (right) vs. Giorgi Tokhadze

== Final rankings ==
Rank	Athlete
1st place, gold medalist(s)	Wataru Sasaki (JPN)
2nd place, silver medalist(s)	Giorgi Tokhadze (GEO)
3rd place, bronze medalist(s)	Axel Salas (MEX)
4	Eduardo Lovera (ARG)
5	Mehdi Jouini (TUN)
6	Alexander Adiniwin (MHL)

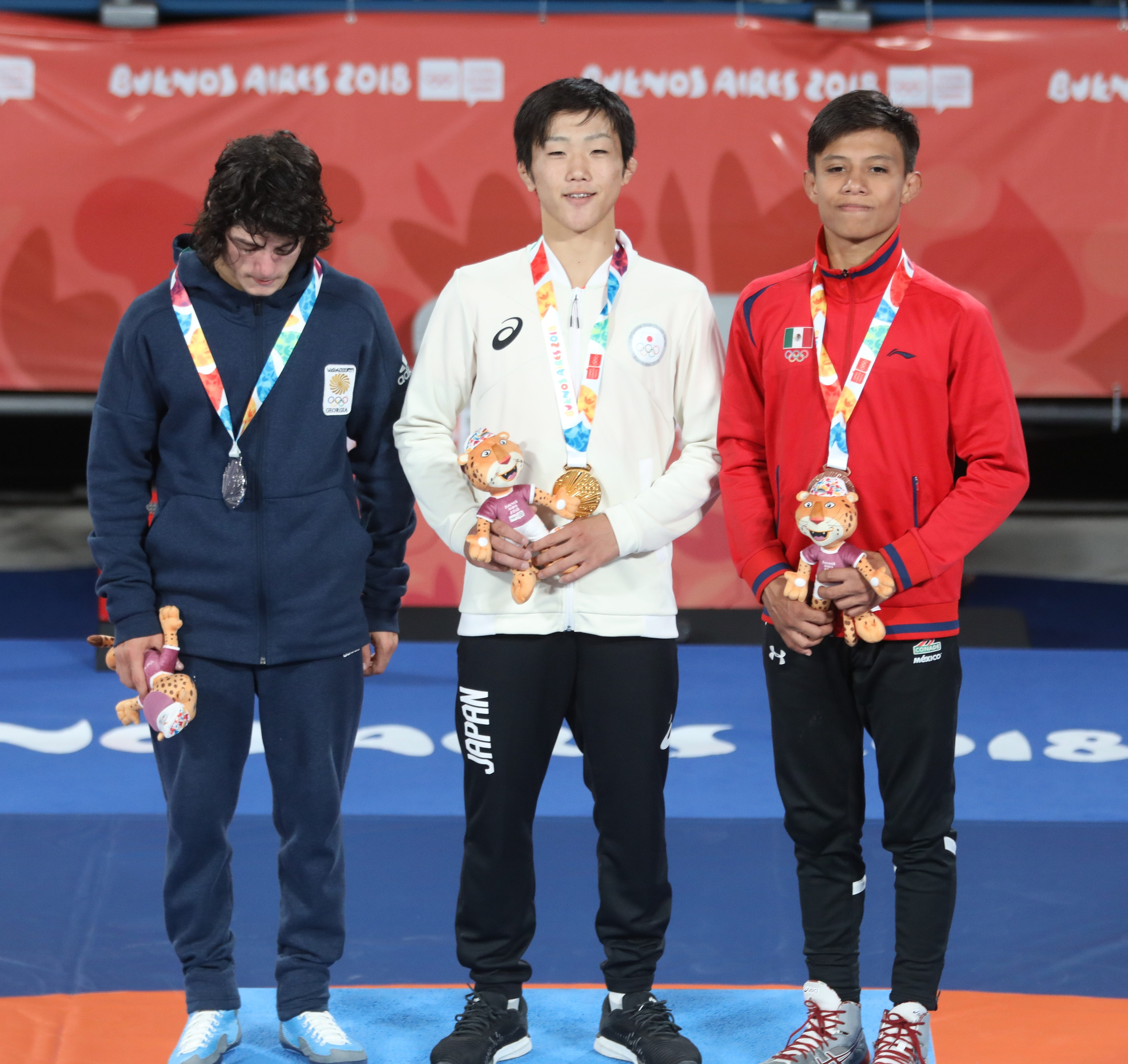
Victory ceremony (from left to right): Giorgi Tokhadze (Silver), Wataru Sasaki (Gold), Axel Salas (Bronze)
