= Nauru at the 2018 Summer Youth Olympics =

- IOC code: NRU
- NOC: Nauru Olympic Committee
- Website: http://www.oceaniasport.com/nauru/

in Buenos Aires, Argentina 6 – 18 October 2018
- Competitors: 5 in 4 sports
- Medals: Gold 0 Silver 0 Bronze 0 Total 0

Summer Youth Olympics appearances
- 2010; 2014; 2018; 2026

Nauru participated at the 2018 Summer Youth Olympics in Buenos Aires, Argentina from 6 October to 18 October 2018.

== Competitors ==
Sports	Boys	Girls	Total	Events
Athletics	0	1	1	1
Boxing	1	0	1	1
Weightlifting	1	1	2	2
Wrestling	1	0	1	1
Total	3	2	5	5

== Athletics ==
Track & road events

Athlete	Event	Stage 1		Stage 2		Total	
Athlete	Event	Time	Rank	Time	Rank	Time	Rank
Melanie Ribauw	Girls' 100 metres	14.05	33	13.47	31	27.52	31

== Boxing ==
Boys

Athlete	Event	Preliminary R1	Preliminary R2	Semifinals	Final / RM	Rank
Athlete	Event	Opposition Result	Opposition Result	Opposition Result	Opposition Result	Rank
Christon Amram	-56 kg	Halinichev (UKR); L 0–5	Abbaz (MAR); L 0–5	Did not advance	Qamili (ALB); L WO	6

== Weightlifting ==
Nauru was given a quota by the tripartite committee to compete in weightlifting. They also qualified two at the Oceania championships 2018.

Boy

Athlete	Event	Snatch		Clean & Jerk		Total	Rank
Athlete	Event	Result	Rank	Result	Rank	Total	Rank
Ezekiel Moses	−62 kg	105	8	130	7	235	7

Girl

Athlete	Event	Snatch		Clean & jerk		Total	Rank
Athlete	Event	Result	Rank	Result	Rank	Total	Rank
Maximina Uepa	−63 kg	82	6	101	6	183	6

== Wrestling ==
Key:
- VSU – Without any points scored by the opponent

Athlete	Event	Group stage			Final / RM	Rank
Athlete	Event	Opposition Score	Opposition Score	Rank	Opposition Score	Rank
Daiziel Detudamo	Boys' freestyle −48kg	Zuluaga (COL); L 0 – 10 ^{VSU}	Gegelashvili (GEO); L 0 – 10 ^{VSU}	3 Q	Booysen (RSA); L 0 – 10 ^{VSU}	6
