= Weightlifting at the 2018 Summer Youth Olympics – Boys' 69 kg =

Boys' 69 kg at the III Summer Youth Olympic Games
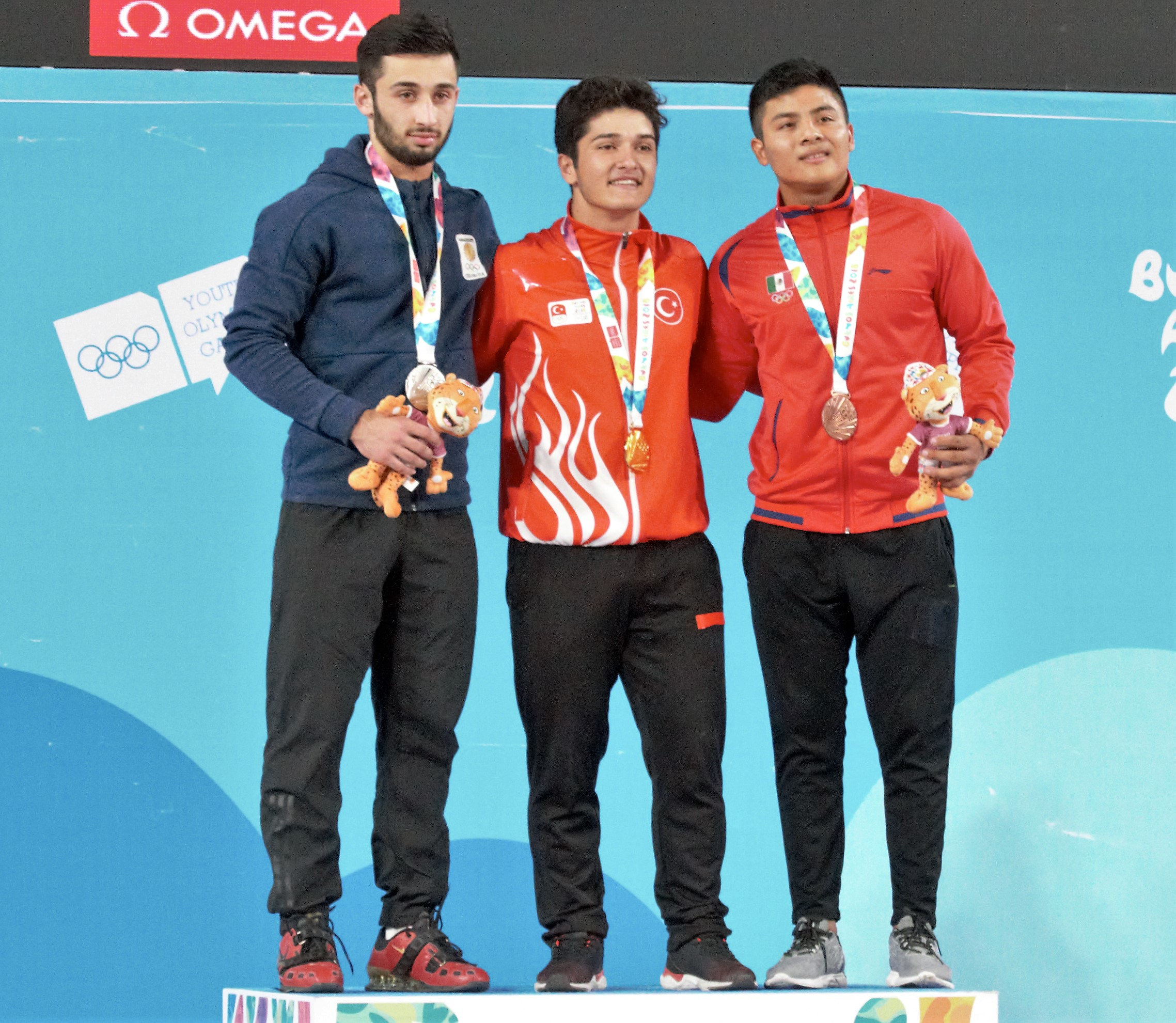
- Venue: Parque Polideportivo Roca
- Dates: October 9
- Competitors: 6 from 6 nations

Medalists
1st place, gold medalist(s)		Muhammed Furkan Özbek; Turkey
2nd place, silver medalist(s)		Archil Malakmadze; Georgia
3rd place, bronze medalist(s)		Mauricio Cristofer Canul Facundo; Mexico

These are the results for the boys' 69 kg event at the 2018 Summer Youth Olympics.

== Results ==
Rank	Name	Nation	Body Weight	Snatch (kg)				Clean & Jerk (kg)				Total (kg)
Rank	Name	Nation	Body Weight	1	2	3	Res	1	2	3	Res	Total (kg)
1st place, gold medalist(s)	Muhammed Furkan Özbek	Turkey		132	~~135~~	135	135	158	165	170	170	305
2nd place, silver medalist(s)	Archil Malakmadze	Georgia		130	134	~~138~~	134	150	154	~~157~~	154	288
3rd place, bronze medalist(s)	Mauricio Cristofer Canul Facundo	Mexico		124	~~127~~	127	127	154	156	~~160~~	156	283
4	Jerome Anthony Smith	United States		121	125	127	127	150	155	~~158~~	155	282
5	Sittichai Tangsut	Thailand		110	116	120	120	140	145	~~155~~	145	265
6	Sebastián Cabala	Slovakia		~~107~~	107	~~115~~	107	138	~~143~~	148	148	255
