= Judo at the 2018 Summer Youth Olympics – Boys' 100 kg =

Judo competition

Boys' 100 kg at the III Summer Youth Olympic Games
- Venue: Parque Polideportivo Roca
- Date: 9 October
- Competitors: 11 from 11 nations

Medalists
1st place, gold medalist(s)		Bekarys Saduakas	Kazakhstan
2nd place, silver medalist(s)		Ilia Sulamanidze	Georgia
3rd place, bronze medalist(s)		Ömer Aydın	Turkey
3rd place, bronze medalist(s)		Zsombor Vég	Hungary

The Boys' 100 kg competition at the 2018 Summer Youth Olympics was held on 9 October, at the Asia Pavilion.

== Schedule ==
All times are in local time (UTC-3).

Date	Time	Round
Sunday, 9 October 2018	10:00; 11:00; 11:00; 12:00; 15:00	Round of 16; Quarterfinals; Repechage Rounds; Semifinals; Finals

== Results ==
Legend

- 1st number — Ippon
- 2nd number — Waza-ari
- s — Shido

=== Main Bracket ===
Round of 16
Fleury Nihozeko (BDI)	00s3
Abolfazl Shojaei (IRI)	10s1
Julián Gutiérrez (MEX)	00
Wu Xiao-zhang (TPE)	10
Rok Pogorevc (SLO)	00s1
Ilia Sulamanidze (GEO)	10

Quarterfinals
Bekarys Saduakas (KAZ)	11
Abolfazl Shojaei (IRI)	00s1
Zsombor Vég (HUN)	10
Alin Bagrin (MDA)	00
Ömer Aydın (TUR)	01
Wu Xiao-zhang (TPE)	00s1
Joaquín Burgos (ARG)	00s1
Ilia Sulamanidze (GEO)	10s1

Semifinals
Bekarys Saduakas (KAZ)	01s1
Zsombor Vég (HUN)	00s2
Ömer Aydın (TUR)	00s1
Ilia Sulamanidze (GEO)	01s1

Finals
Bekarys Saduakas (KAZ)	01s2
Ilia Sulamanidze (GEO)	00s2

=== Repechage ===
Repechage 1

Repechage 2
Fleury Nihozeko (BDI)	00
Alin Bagrin (MDA)	10
Julián Gutiérrez (MEX)	00s1
Joaquín Burgos (ARG)	01s1
Rok Pogorevc (SLO)	10s1
Wu Xiao-zhang (TPE)	000

Repechage 3
Alin Bagrin (MDA)	10s1
Abolfazl Shojaei (IRI)	01
Joaquín Burgos (ARG)	00s1
Rok Pogorevc (SLO)	10

Bronze Medal Finals
Alin Bagrin (MDA)	01
Ömer Aydın (TUR)	10
Rok Pogorevc (SLO)	00
Zsombor Vég (HUN)	10
