= Wrestling at the 2018 Summer Youth Olympics – Boys' freestyle 48 kg =

Boys' freestyle 48kg at the III Summer Youth Olympic Games
- Venue: Asia Pavilion
- Date: 14 October 2018
- Competitors: 6 from 6 nations

Medalists
1st place, gold medalist(s)		Umidjon Jalolov; Uzbekistan
2nd place, silver medalist(s)		Giorgi Gegelashvili; Georgia
3rd place, bronze medalist(s)		Halil Gökdeniz; Turkey

The boys' freestyle 48 kg competition at the 2018 Summer Youth Olympics was held on 14 October, at the Asia Pavilion.

== Competition format ==
As there were less than six wrestlers in a weight category, the pool phase will be run as a single group competing in a round-robin format. Ranking within the groups is used to determine the pairings for the final phase.

== Schedule ==
All times are in local time (UTC-3).

Date	Time	Round
Sunday, 14 October 2018	10:00; 10:25; 10:50; 17:00	Round 1 Round 2 Round 3 Finals

== Results ==
Legend

- F — Won by fall

Group Stages

Qualified for the Gold-medal match
Qualified for the Bronze-medal match
Qualified for the 5th/6th Place Match

Group A

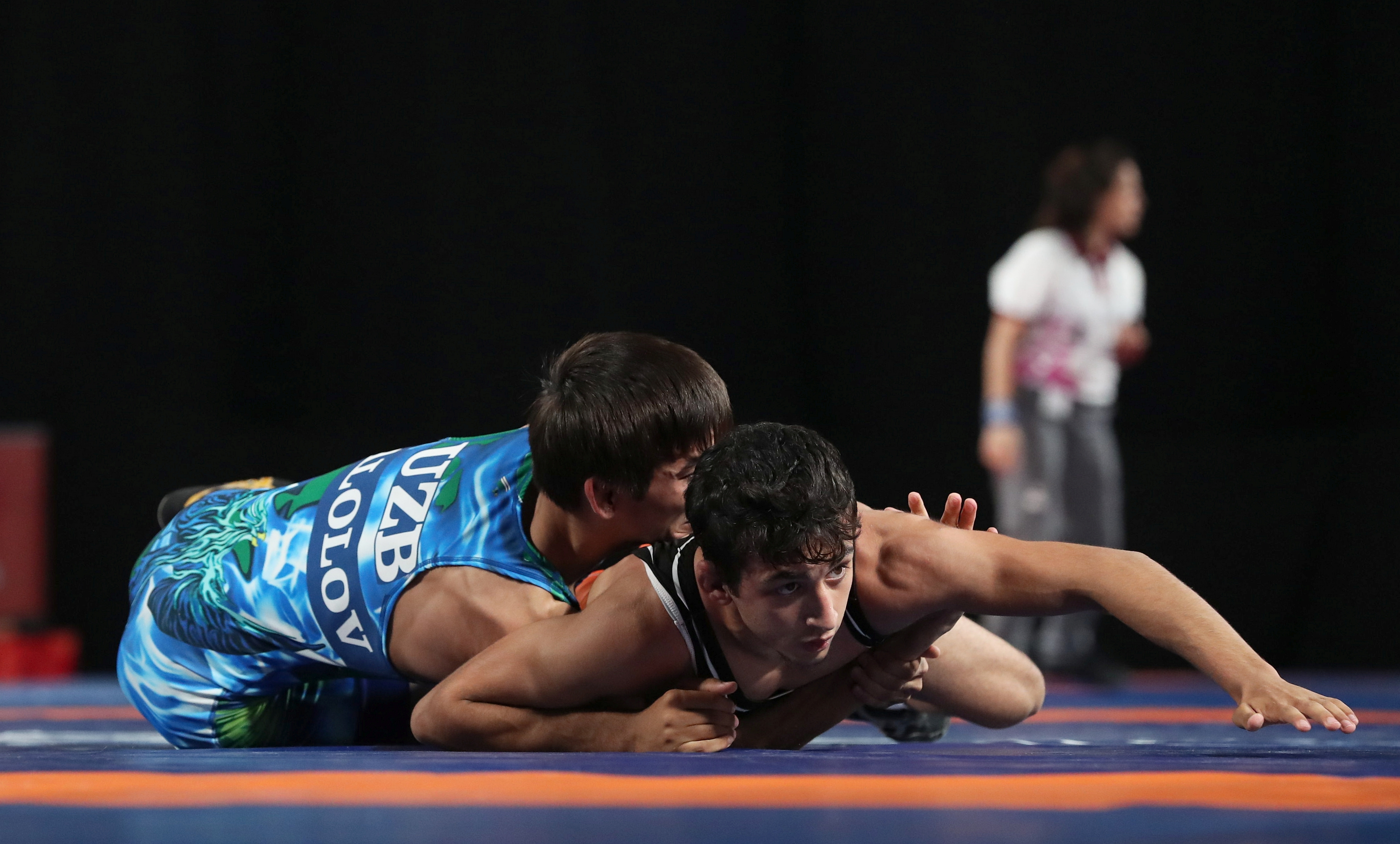
Umidjon Jalolov vs. Halil Gökdeniz

Pos	Athlete	Pld	W	L	CP	TP	Qualification
1	Umidjon Jalolov (UZB)	2	2	0	7	21	Gold-medal match
2	Halil Gökdeniz (TUR)	2	1	1	5	13	Bronze-medal match
3	Fernando Booysen (RSA)	2	0	2	0	0	Classification 5th/6th place match

Source: UWW

	Score		CP
Umidjon Jalolov (UZB)	10–0	Fernando Booysen (RSA)	4–0 VSU
Halil Gökdeniz (TUR)	3–11	Umidjon Jalolov (UZB)	1–3 VPO1
Fernando Booysen (RSA)	0–10	Halil Gökdeniz (TUR)	0–4 VSU

Group B

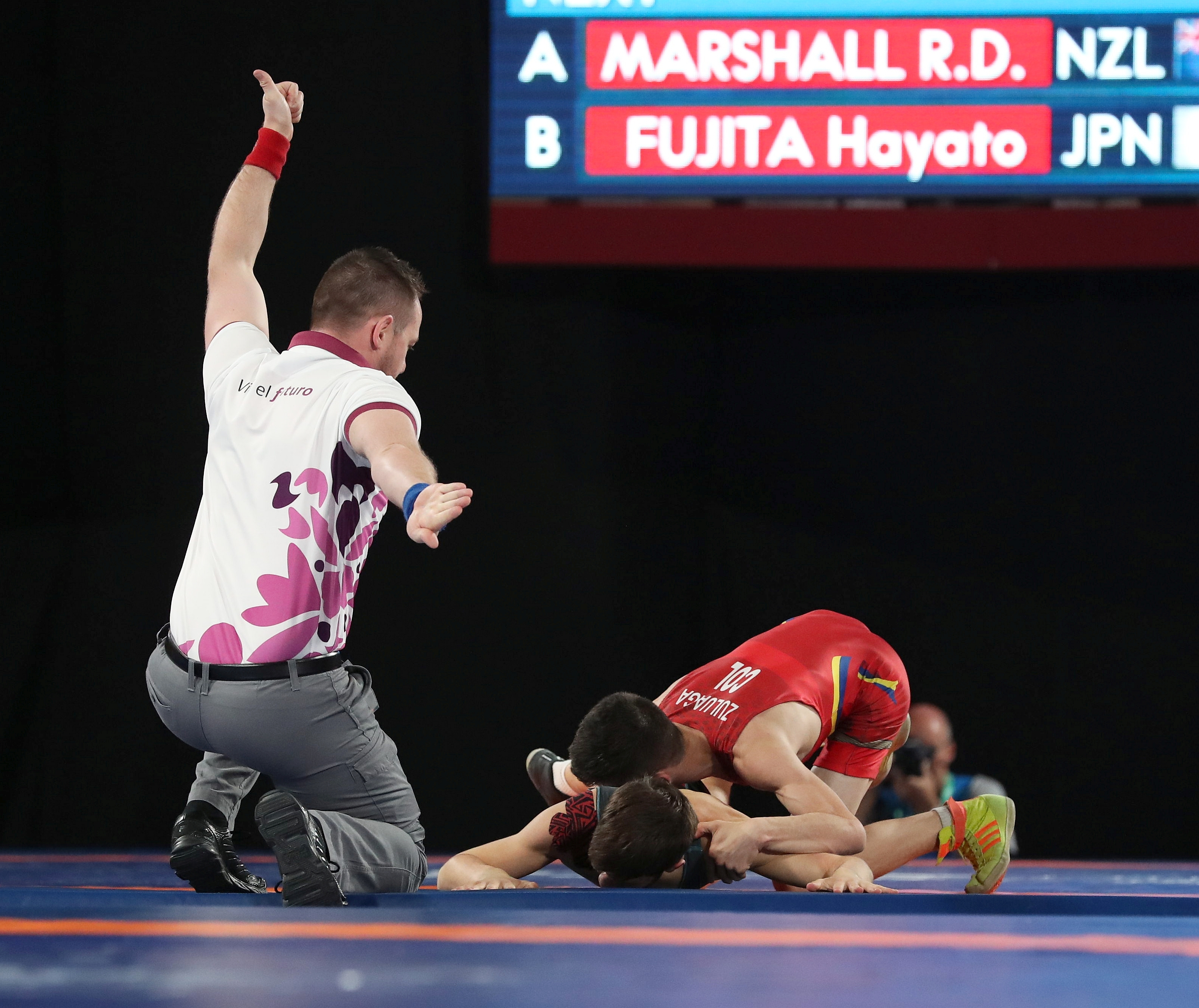
Giorgi Gegelashvili vs. Diego Zuluaga

Pos	Athlete	Pld	W	L	CP	TP	Qualification
1	Giorgi Gegelashvili (GEO)	2	2	0	8	22	Gold-medal match
2	Diego Zuluaga (COL)	2	1	1	5	11	Bronze-medal match
3	Daiziel Detudamo (NRU)	2	0	2	0	0	Classification 5th/6th place match

Source: UWW

	Score		CP
Diego Zuluaga (COL)	1–12	Giorgi Gegelashvili (GEO)	1–4 VSU1
Daiziel Detudamo (NRU)	0–10	Diego Zuluaga (COL)	0–4 VSU
Giorgi Gegelashvili (GEO)	10–0	Daiziel Detudamo (NRU)	4–0 VSU

=== Finals ===
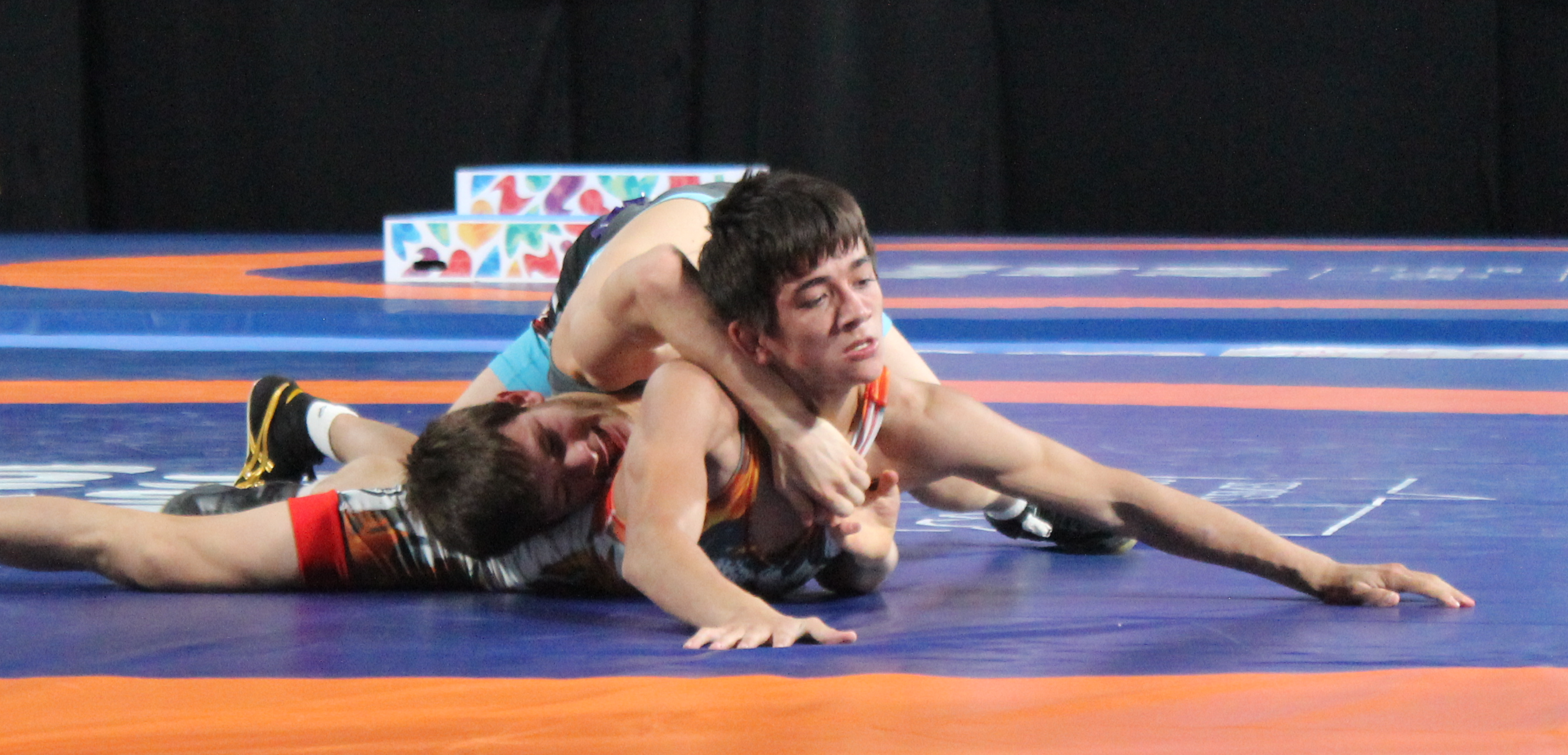
Umidjon Jalolov vs. Giorgi Gegelashvili

Gold-medal match
Umidjon Jalolov (UZB)	8
Giorgi Gegelashvili (GEO)	2

Bronze-medal match
Halil Gökdeniz (TUR)	4^{F}
Diego Zuluaga (COL)	0

Classification 5th/6th place match
Fernando Booysen (RSA)	10
Daiziel Detudamo (NRU)	0

== Final rankings ==
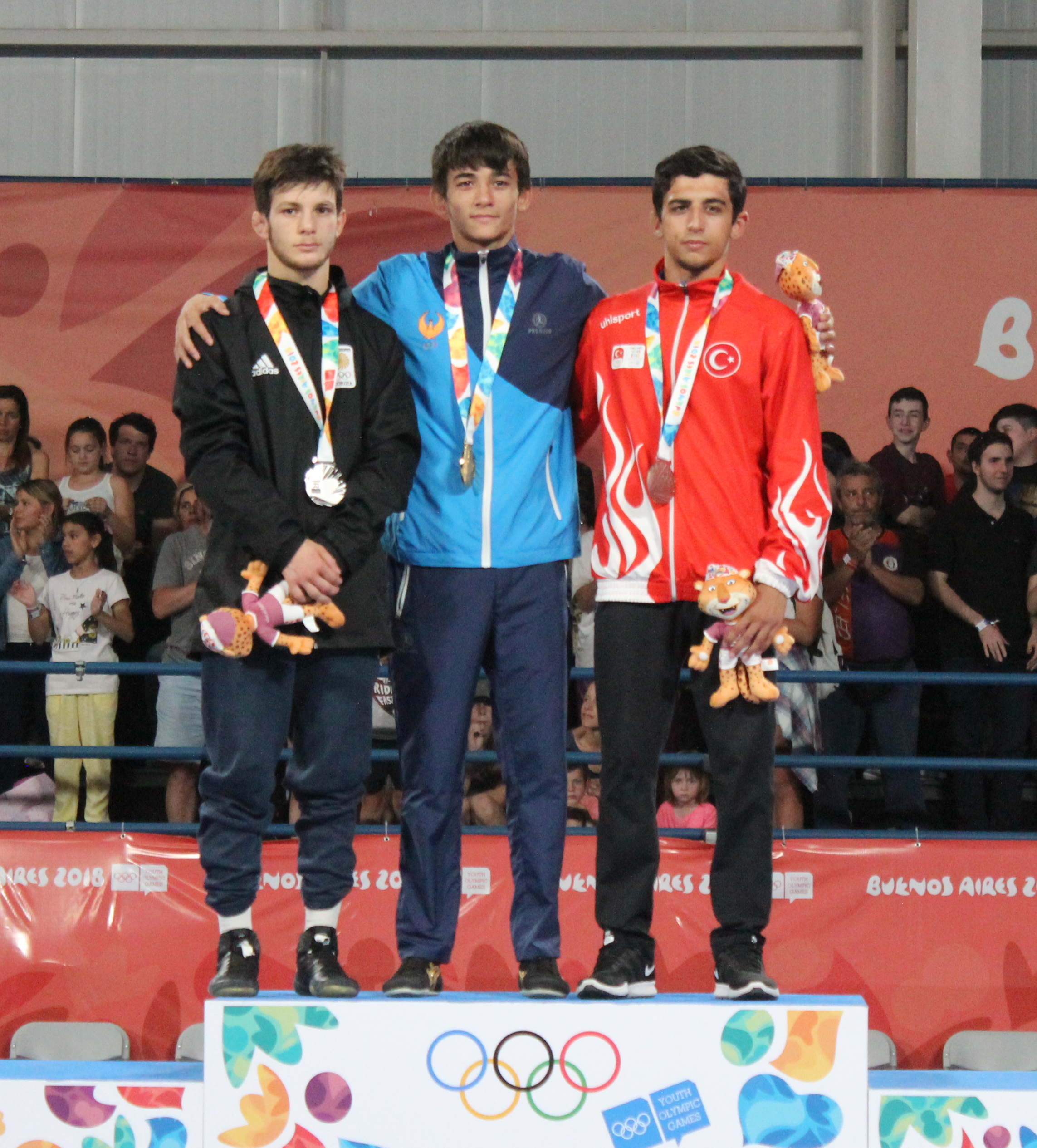
Victory ceremony

Rank	Athlete
1st place, gold medalist(s)	Umidjon Jalolov (UZB)
2nd place, silver medalist(s)	Giorgi Gegelashvili (GEO)
3rd place, bronze medalist(s)	Halil Gökdeniz (TUR)
4	Diego Zuluaga (COL)
5	Fernando Booysen (RSA)
6	Daiziel Detudamo (NRU)
