= Turkey at the 2018 Summer Youth Olympics =

- IOC code: TUR
- NOC: Turkish Olympic Committee
- Website: https://www.olimpiyatkomitesi.org.tr/

in Buenos Aires, Argentina 6 – 18 October 2018
- Competitors: 56 in 17 sports
- Medals Ranked 31st: Gold 2 Silver 2 Bronze 7 Total 11

Summer Youth Olympics appearances (overview)
- 2010; 2014; 2018; 2026

Turkey participated at the 2018 Summer Youth Olympics in Buenos Aires, Argentina from 6 October to 18 October 2018.

== Competitors ==
Sport	Boys	Girls	Total
Archery	1	1	2
Athletics	11	6	3
Badminton	0	1	1
Beach handball	0	9	9
Fencing	0	1	1
Gymnastics, Artistic	1	1	1
Judo	1	1	2
Karate	1	1	2
Modern pentathlon	1	1	2
Rowing	2	0	1
Sailing	0	1	1
Shooting	1	0	2
Swimming	2	2	4
Taekwondo	0	2	2
Tennis	1	0	1
Weightlifting	2	2	4
Wrestling	2	1	3
Total	26	30	56

== Archery ==
Turkey qualified one archer based on its performance at the 2017 World Archery Youth Championships. Later, Turkey qualified a female archer based on its performance at the 2018 European Youth Championships.

Individual

Athlete	Event	Ranking round		Round of 32	Round of 16	Quarterfinals	Semifinals	Final / BM	Rank
Athlete	Event	Score	Seed	Opposition Score	Opposition Score	Opposition Score	Opposition Score	Opposition Score	Rank
Samet Ak	Boys' Individual	672	9	Potrafke (GER); W 6–4	Roos (BEL); L 1–7	did not advance			9
Selin Satır	Girls' Individual	617	28	Chang (TPE); L 4–6	did not advance				17

Team

Athletes	Event	Ranking round		Round of 32	Round of 16	Quarterfinals	Semifinals	Final / BM	Rank
Athletes	Event	Score	Seed	Opposition Score	Opposition Score	Opposition Score	Opposition Score	Opposition Score	Rank
Samet Ak (TUR); Hnin Pyae Sone (MYA)	Mixed Team	1300	12	Rahmani (IRI); Cadena (COL); W 6–0	Jones (NZL); Tang (TPE); L 1–5	did not advance			9
Selin Satır (TUR); Akash Akash (IND)	Mixed Team	1296	24	Jerez (DOM); De Carvalho (BRA); W 5–3	Winkel (NED); Cheremiskin (RUS); W 6–2	Giannasio (ARG); Aitthiwat (THA); L 0–6	did not advance		8

== Badminton ==
Turkey qualified one player based on the Badminton Junior World Rankings.

Singles

Athlete	Event	Group stage				Quarterfinal	Semifinal	Final / BM	Rank
Athlete	Event	Opposition Score	Opposition Score	Opposition Score	Rank	Opposition Score	Opposition Score	Opposition Score	Rank
Nazlıcan İnci	Girls' Singles	King (GBR); L 1–2	Švábíková (CZE); L 1–2	Hooi (SGP); L 0–2	4	did not advance			9

Team

Athlete	Event	Group stage				Quarterfinal	Semifinal	Final / BM	Rank
Athlete	Event	Opposition Score	Opposition Score	Opposition Score	Rank	Opposition Score	Opposition Score	Opposition Score	Rank
Team Epsilon; Nazlıcan İnci (TUR); Chen Shiau-cheng (TPE); Fabricio Farias (BRA); Nguyễn Hải Đăng (VIE); Tomas Toledano (ESP); Goh Jin Wei (MAS); Vlada Gînga (MDA); Aminat Oluwafunke Ilori (NGR)	Mixed Teams	Alpha (MIX); L (98–110)	Zeta (MIX); L (89–110)	Delta (MIX); W (110–108)	4Q	Omega (MIX); L (102–110)	did not advance		5

== Beach handball ==
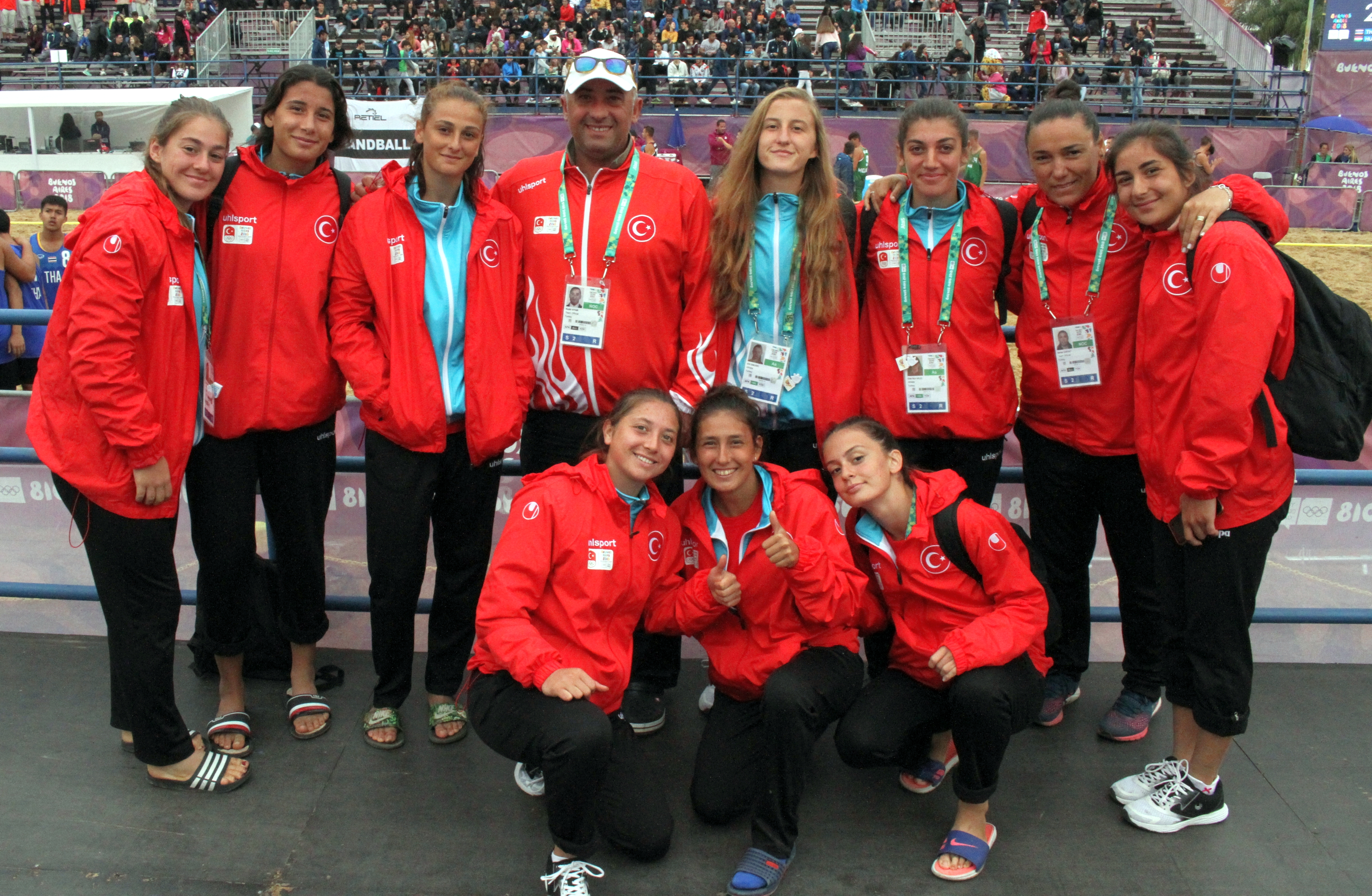
The Turkish Beach handball team

== Gymnastics ==
=== Artistic ===
Turkey qualified two gymnasts based on its performance at the 2018 European Junior Championship.

- Boys' artistic individual all-around - 1 quota
- Girls' artistic individual all-around - 1 quota

== Judo ==
Individual

Athlete	Event	Round of 16	Quarterfinals	Semifinals	Rep 1	Rep 2	Rep 3	Final / BM	Rank
Athlete	Event	Opposition Result	Opposition Result	Opposition Result	Opposition Result	Opposition Result	Opposition Result	Opposition Result	Rank
Ömer Aydın	Boys' 100 kg	Bye	Wu Xiao-zhang (TPE); W 01-00s1	Ilia Sulamanidze (GEO); L 00s1-01s1	Bye			Alin Bagrin (MDA); W 10-01	3rd place, bronze medalist(s)
Hasret Bozkurt	Girls' 63 kg	Bye	Nikol Pencue (COL); L 000-10s1	did not advance	Bye	Yassamine Djellab (ALG); W 10-00	Saskia Brothers (AUS); W 10-00	Alessia Corrao (BEL); L 01-10	4

Team

Athletes	Event	Round of 16	Quarterfinals	Semifinals	Final	Rank
Athletes	Event	Opposition Result	Opposition Result	Opposition Result	Opposition Result	Rank
Team Sydney; Giorgia Hagianu (ROU); Fatime Barka Segue (CHA); Irena Khubulova (RUS); Shakhida Narmukhamedova (KGZ); Euclides Lopes (GBS); Simon Zulu (ZAM); Keagan Young (CAN); Ömer Aydın (TUR)	Mixed Team	Team Rio de Janeiro (MIX); L 3–4	did not advance			9
Team Nanjing; Hasret Bozkurt (TUR); Joaquín Burgos (ARG); Nilufar Ermaganbetova (UZB); Rihari Iki (NZL); Alaa Mousaad Mohamed (EGY); Eva Pérez Soler (ESP); Vugar Talibov (AZE); Romain Valadier-Picard (FRA)	Mixed Team	—N/a	Team Beijing (MIX); L 3–4	did not advance		

== Karate ==
Turkey qualified two athletes based on the rankings in the Buenos Aires 2018 Olympic Standings.

- Boys' +68 kg - Enes Bulut
- Girls' -53 kg - Damla Ocak

Athlete	Event	Group Stage				Semifinal	Final	
Athlete	Event	Opposition Score	Opposition Score	Opposition Score	Rank	Opposition Score	Opposition Score	Rank
Damla Ocak	Girls' 53 kg	Dildora Alikulova (UZB); L (0-1)	Yasmin Nasr Elgewily (EGY); L (1-2)	Catalina Valdés (CHI); W (2-0)	3	did not advance		
Enes Bulut	Boys' +68 kg	Raukawa Jefferies (NZL); W (1-0)	Robert Avakimov (RUS); W (7-0)	Nabil Ech-Chaabi (MAR); D (0-0)	1	Navid Mohammadi (IRI); D (3-3)	did not advance	3rd place, bronze medalist(s)

== Rowing ==
Turkey qualified one boat based on its performance at the 2017 World Junior Rowing Championships.

- Boys' pair – 2 athletes

== Sailing ==
Turkey qualified one boat based on its performance at the 2017 World Championships.

- Girls' Techno 293+ - 1 boat

Athlete	Event	Race													Net points	Final rank
Athlete	Event	1	2	3	4	5	6	7	8	9	10	11	12	M*	Net points	Final rank
Eda Yavuz	Girls' Techno 293+	20	21	24^{†} DNF	11		13	18	14	16	19	17	12	17	178	18

== Shooting ==
Individual

Athlete	Event	Qualification		Final	
Athlete	Event	Points	Rank	Points	Rank
Alp Eren Erdur	Boys' 10m air pistol	551-8	16	did not advance	

Team

Athletes	Event	Qualification		Round of 16	Quarterfinals	Semifinals	Final / BM	
Athletes	Event	Points	Rank	Opposition Result	Opposition Result	Opposition Result	Opposition Result	Rank
Anja Prezelj (SLO); Alp Eren Erdur (TUR)	Mixed 10m air pistol	733-9	18	did not advance				

== Taekwondo ==
Girls

Athlete	Event	Round of 16	Quarterfinals	Semifinals	Final	
Athlete	Event	Opposition Result	Opposition Result	Opposition Result	Opposition Result	Rank
Emina Gogebakan	−44 kg	Bye	Stojković (CRO); L 3-17	did not advance		
Dilara Arslan	+63 kg	—N/a	Adebaio (RUS); L 2–4	did not advance		

== Tennis ==
Singles

Athlete	Event	Round of 32	Round of 16	Quarterfinals	Semifinals	Final / BM	
Athlete	Event	Opposition Score	Opposition Score	Opposition Score	Opposition Score	Opposition Score	Rank
Yankı Erel	Boys' singles	Boyer (USA); W (6-3, 7^{11}-6^{9})	Andreev (BUL); L (3-6, 7-5, 3-6)	did not advance			9

Doubles

Athletes	Event	Round of 32	Round of 16	Quarterfinals	Semifinals	Final / BM	
Athletes	Event	Opposition Score	Opposition Score	Opposition Score	Opposition Score	Opposition Score	Rank
Yankı Erel; Lorenzo Musetti (ITA)	Boys' doubles	—N/a	Štyler (CZE) / Svrčina (CZE); L (4-6, 2-6)	did not advance			9
Margaryta Bilokin (UKR); Yankı Erel	Mixed doubles	Molinaro (LUX) / de Jong (NED); L (1-6, 6^{3}-7)	did not advance				17

== Weightlifting ==
Turkey qualified four athletes based on its performance at the 2017 World Youth Championships.

Boys

Athlete	Event	Snatch		Clean & Jerk		Total	Rank
Athlete	Event	Result	Rank	Result	Rank	Total	Rank
Caner Toptaş	−62 kg	122	2	141	4	263	2nd place, silver medalist(s)
Muhammed Ozbek	−69 kg	135	1	170	1	305	1st place, gold medalist(s)

Girls

Athlete	Event	Snatch		Clean & jerk		Total	Rank
Athlete	Event	Result	Rank	Result	Rank	Total	Rank
Nida Karasakal	−44 kg	60	3	78	2	138	3rd place, bronze medalist(s)
Dilara Narin	+63 kg	92	3	126	2	218	1st place, gold medalist(s)

- Supatchanin Khamhaeng from Thailand was disqualified after testing positive for a banned substance. She was stripped of her gold medal and Dilara Narin got the gold medal instead of the silver medal.

== Wrestling ==
Key:
- VFA – Victory by Fall
- VSU – Without any points scored by the opponent
- VSU1 – With point(s) scored by the opponent
- VPO – Without any points scored by the opponent
- VPO1 – With point(s) scored by the opponent

Athlete	Event	Group stage					Final / RM	Rank
Athlete	Event	Opposition Score	Opposition Score	Opposition Score	Opposition Score	Rank	Opposition Score	Rank
Osman Ayaydın	Boys' Greco-Roman −92kg	Bartley (ASA); W 4 – 0 ^{VFA}	Wehib (EGY); W 2 – 1 ^{VPO1}	—N/a		1 Q	Nosrati (IRI); L 1 – 3 ^{VPO1}	2nd place, silver medalist(s)
Halil Gökdeniz	Boys' freestyle −48kg	Jalolov (UZB); L 3 – 11 ^{VPO1}	Booysen (RSA); W 10 – 0 ^{VSU}	—N/a		2 Q	Zuluaga (COL); W 4 – 0 ^{VFA}	3rd place, bronze medalist(s)
Vahide Nur Gök	Girls' freestyle −73kg	Machuca (ARG); L 1 – 8 ^{VFA}	Jlassi (TUN); L 1 – 6 ^{VFA}	Dzibuk (BLR); L 0 – 8 ^{VFA}	Oknazarova (UZB); L 0 – 7 ^{VFA}	5 Q	Ludgate (ASA); W WO	9
