= Marshall Islands at the 2018 Summer Youth Olympics =

- IOC code: MHL
- NOC: Marshall Islands National Olympic Committee

in Buenos Aires, Argentina 6 – 18 October 2018
- Competitors: 5 in 4 sports
- Medals: Gold 0 Silver 0 Bronze 0 Total 0

Summer Youth Olympics appearances
- 2010; 2014; 2018

Marshall Islands participated at the 2018 Summer Youth Olympics in Buenos Aires, Argentina from 6 October to 18 October 2018.

== Swimming ==
Boys

| Athlete | Event | Heats | | Semifinals | | Final | |
| Athlete | Event | Time | Rank | Time | Rank | Time | Rank |
|---|---|---|---|---|---|---|---|
| Daniel Ranis | 50 m freestyle | 29.21 | 48 | did not advance | | | |
| Daniel Ranis | 100 m freestyle | 1:09.42 | 46 | did not advance | | | |

Girls

| Athlete | Event | Heats | | Semifinals | | Final | |
| Athlete | Event | Time | Rank | Time | Rank | Time | Rank |
|---|---|---|---|---|---|---|---|
| Kayla Hepler | 50 m freestyle | 32.81 | 49 | did not advance | | | |

== Weightlifting ==
Marshall Islands was given a quota by the tripartite committee to compete in weightlifting.

| Athlete | Event | Snatch | | Clean & jerk | | Total | Rank |
| Athlete | Event | Result | Rank | Result | Rank | Total | Rank |
|---|---|---|---|---|---|---|---|
| Joshua Ralpho | Boys' 62 kg | 80 | 13th | 110 | 13th | 190 | 13th |

== Wrestling ==
Key:
- VFA – Victory by Fall
- VSU – Without any point scored by the opponent

| Athlete | Event | Group stage | | | Final / RM | Rank |
| Athlete | Event | Opposition Score | Opposition Score | Rank | Opposition Score | Rank |
|---|---|---|---|---|---|---|
| Alexander Adiniwin | Boys' Greco-Roman −51kg | Lovera (ARG); L 0 – 4 ^{VFA} | Tokhadze (GEO); L 0 – 8 ^{VSU} | 3rd Q | Jouini (TUN); L 0 – 2 ^{VFA} | 6th |
