= Boxing at the 2018 Summer Youth Olympics =

Boxing competitions

Boxing at the III Summer Youth Olympic Games
- Venue: Oceania Pavilion
- Dates: 14–18 October
- No. of events: 13 (9 boys, 4 girls)
- Competitors: 82 (54 boys and 28 girls) from 38 nations

Boxing at the 2018 Summer Youth Olympics was held from 14 to 18 October at the Oceania Pavilion in Buenos Aires, Argentina.

== Qualification ==
Each National Olympic Committee (NOC) can enter a maximum of 5 competitors, 3 males and 2 females with a maximum of 1 competitor in each weight category. As hosts, Argentina was given three quotas (2 boys and 1 girl) to compete and a further 10 quotas, 7 males and 3 females were given to the Tripartite Commission. The remaining 69 places are to be decided through qualification events, namely the 2017 Women's Youth World Championship and continental qualification events.

To be eligible to participate at the Youth Olympics athletes must have been born between 1 January 2000 and 31 December 2001. Furthermore, all athletes must have participated at an AIBA Women's Youth World Championships or at a Youth Continental Championship.

=== Qualification events ===
Event	Location	Date
2017 Youth Women's World Boxing Championships	(India) Guwahati	19–26 November 2017
2018 Youth European Confederation Boxing Championships	(Italy) Roseto degli Abruzzi	17–26 April 2018
2018 Youth Asian Confederation Boxing Championships	(Thailand) Bangkok	19–28 April 2018
2018 Youth African Confederation Boxing Championships	(Morocco) Casablanca	5–13 May 2018
2018 Youth Pan American Confederation Boxing Championships	(United States) Colorado Springs	19–27 May 2018
2018 Youth Oceania Confederation Boxing Championships	(Samoa) Apia	29 May – 2 June 2018

=== Qualification summary ===
NOC	Boys									Girls				Total
NOC	-52 kg	-56 kg	-60 kg	-64 kg	-69 kg	-75 kg	-81 kg	-91 kg	+91 kg	-51 kg	-57 kg	-60 kg	-75 kg	Total
Afghanistan	X													1
Albania		X											X	2
Algeria	X					X		X					X	4
American Samoa					X									1
Argentina		X			X							X		3
Australia									X			X		2
Azerbaijan			X		X									2
Brazil	X				X	X								3
Bulgaria										X				1
Canada			X						X					2
Chile								X						1
Czech Republic								X						1
Egypt			X				X		X					3
France													X	1
Great Britain	X			X			X					X		4
Hungary												X		1
India										X				1
Iran							X							1
Ireland	X										X		X	3
Italy						X				X				2
Kazakhstan				X				X	X	X			X	5
Kosovo				X										1
Mexico											X			1
Morocco		X		X	X						X			4
Nauru		X												1
New Zealand			X								X			2
Nigeria										X		X		2
Poland													X	1
Puerto Rico							X	X						2
Russia				X			X		X				X	4
Samoa						X		X	X					3
Slovakia											X			1
Thailand	X		X			X					X	X		5
Tunisia												X		1
Ukraine		X	X											2
United States				X						X	X			3
Uzbekistan		X			X		X			X				4
Venezuela						X								1
38 NOCs	6	6	6	6	6	6	6	6	6	7	7	7	7	82

== Medal summary ==
=== Medal table ===
* Host nation (Argentina)

Rank	Nation	Gold	Silver	Bronze	Total
1	Russia	3	1	0	4
2	Great Britain	3	0	1	4
3	Thailand	2	2	1	5
4	Kazakhstan	1	2	1	4
5	Argentina*	1	0	2	3
5	Uzbekistan	1	0	2	3
7	Brazil	1	0	1	2
8	Italy	1	0	0	1
9	Algeria	0	2	0	2
9	Ukraine	0	2	0	2
11	France	0	1	0	1
11	Mexico	0	1	0	1
11	Morocco	0	1	0	1
11	Nigeria	0	1	0	1
15	Azerbaijan	0	0	1	1
15	Egypt	0	0	1	1
15	Ireland	0	0	1	1
15	Puerto Rico	0	0	1	1
15	United States	0	0	1	1
Totals (19 entries)		13	13	13	39

=== Boys' events ===
Event	Gold	Silver	Bronze
−52 kg	Ivan Hope Price; Great Britain	Sarawut Sukthet; Thailand	Luiz Gabriel Oliveira; Brazil
−56 kg	Abdumalik Khalokov; Uzbekistan	Maksym Halinichev; Ukraine	Mirco Jehiel Cuello; Argentina
−60 kg	Atichai Phoemsap; Thailand	Taras Bondarchuk; Ukraine	Nurlan Safarov; Azerbaijan
−64 kg	Ilia Popov; Russia	Talgat Shaiken; Kazakhstan	Hassan Azim; Great Britain
−69 kg	Brian Arregui; Argentina	Yassine Elouarz; Morocco	Jakhongir Rakhmonov; Uzbekistan
−75 kg	Keno Machado; Brazil	Farid Douibi; Algeria	Weerapon Jongjoho; Thailand
−81 kg	Karol Itauma; Great Britain	Ruslan Kolesnikov; Russia	Timur Merjanov; Uzbekistan
−91 kg	Aibek Oralbay; Kazakhstan	Mohamed Amine Hacid; Algeria	Alvin Canales; Puerto Rico
+91 kg	Aleksei Dronov; Russia	Damir Toibay; Kazakhstan	Ahmed Elsawy; Egypt

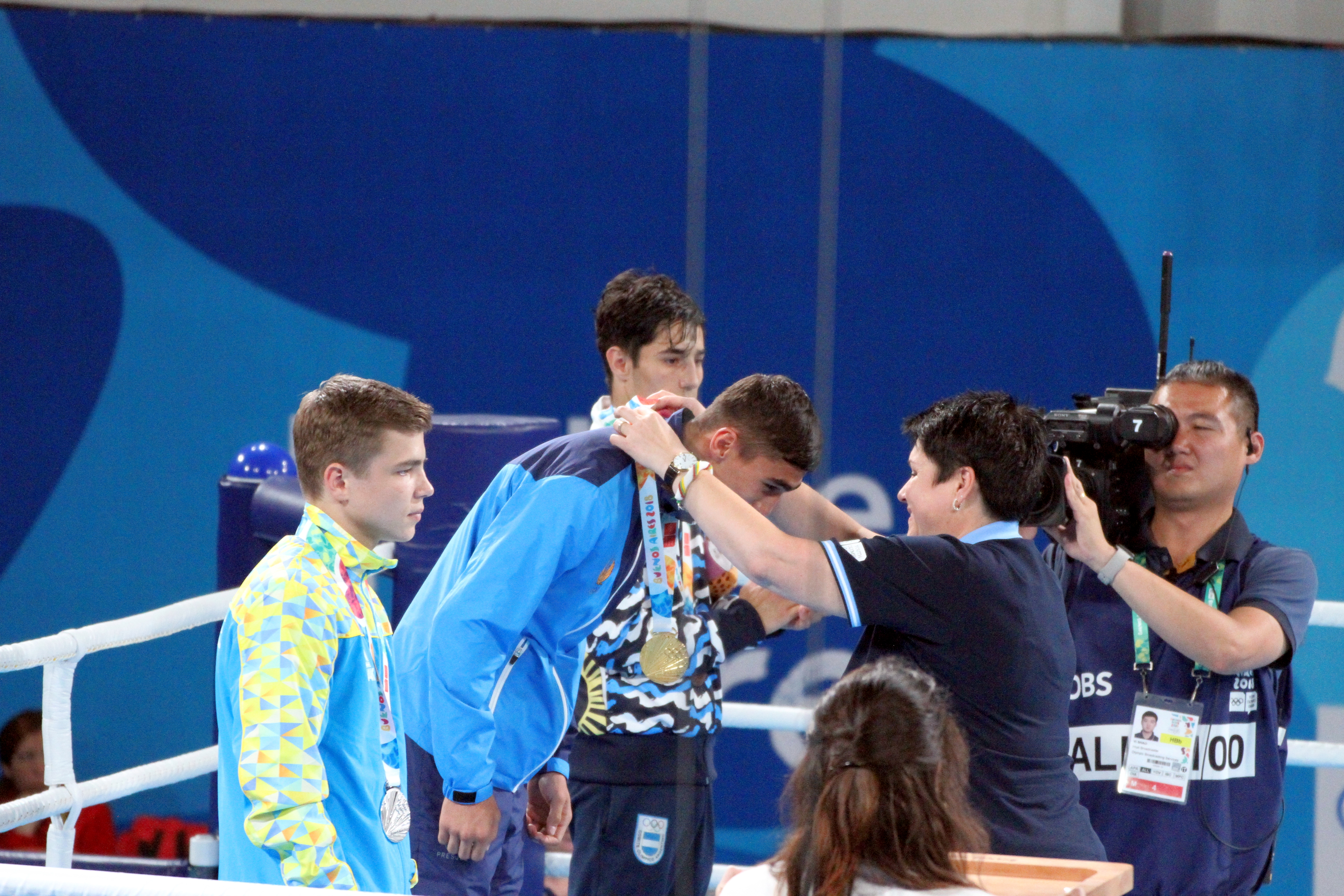
Boys' bantamweight Victory Ceremony

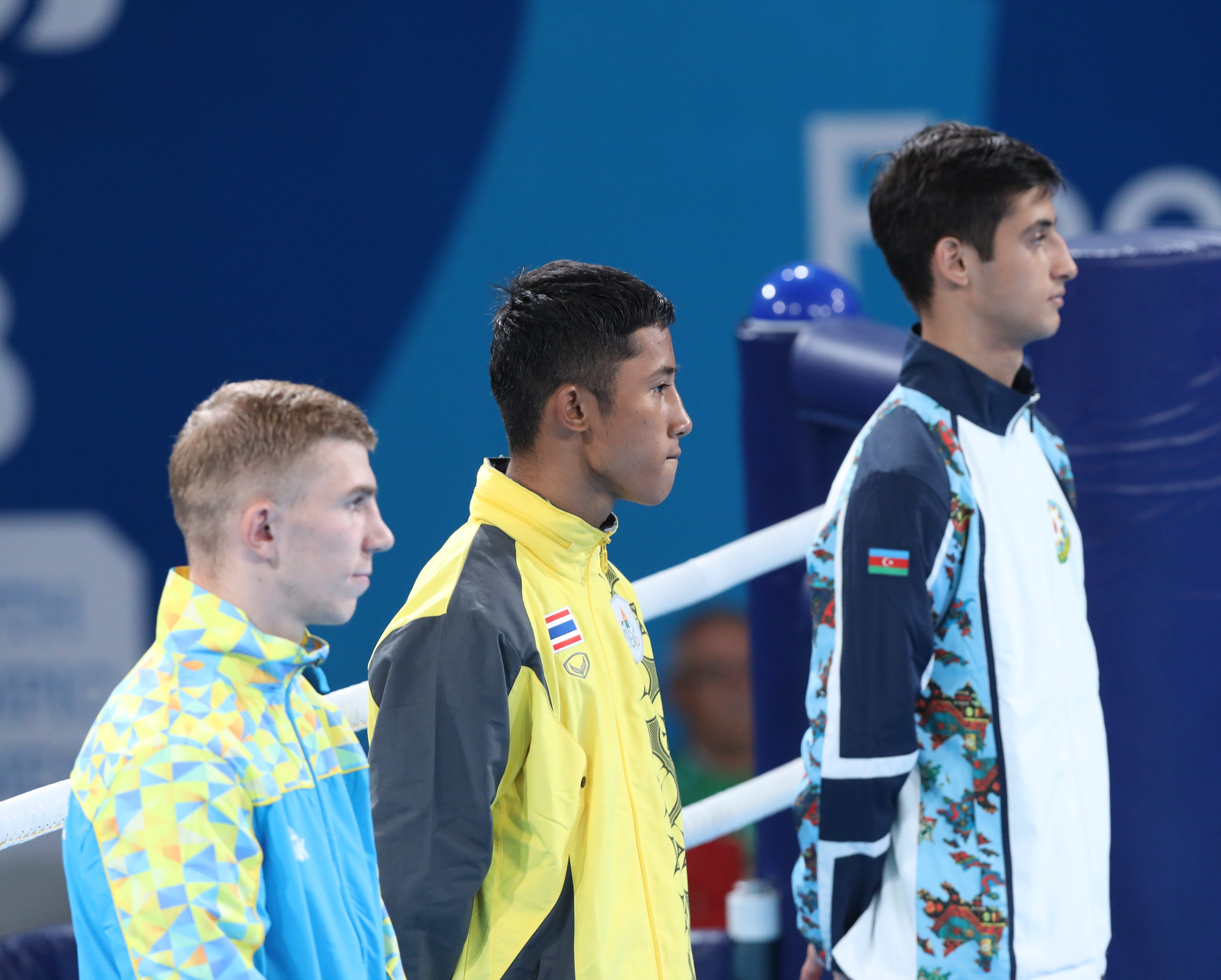
Boys' lightweight Victory Ceremony

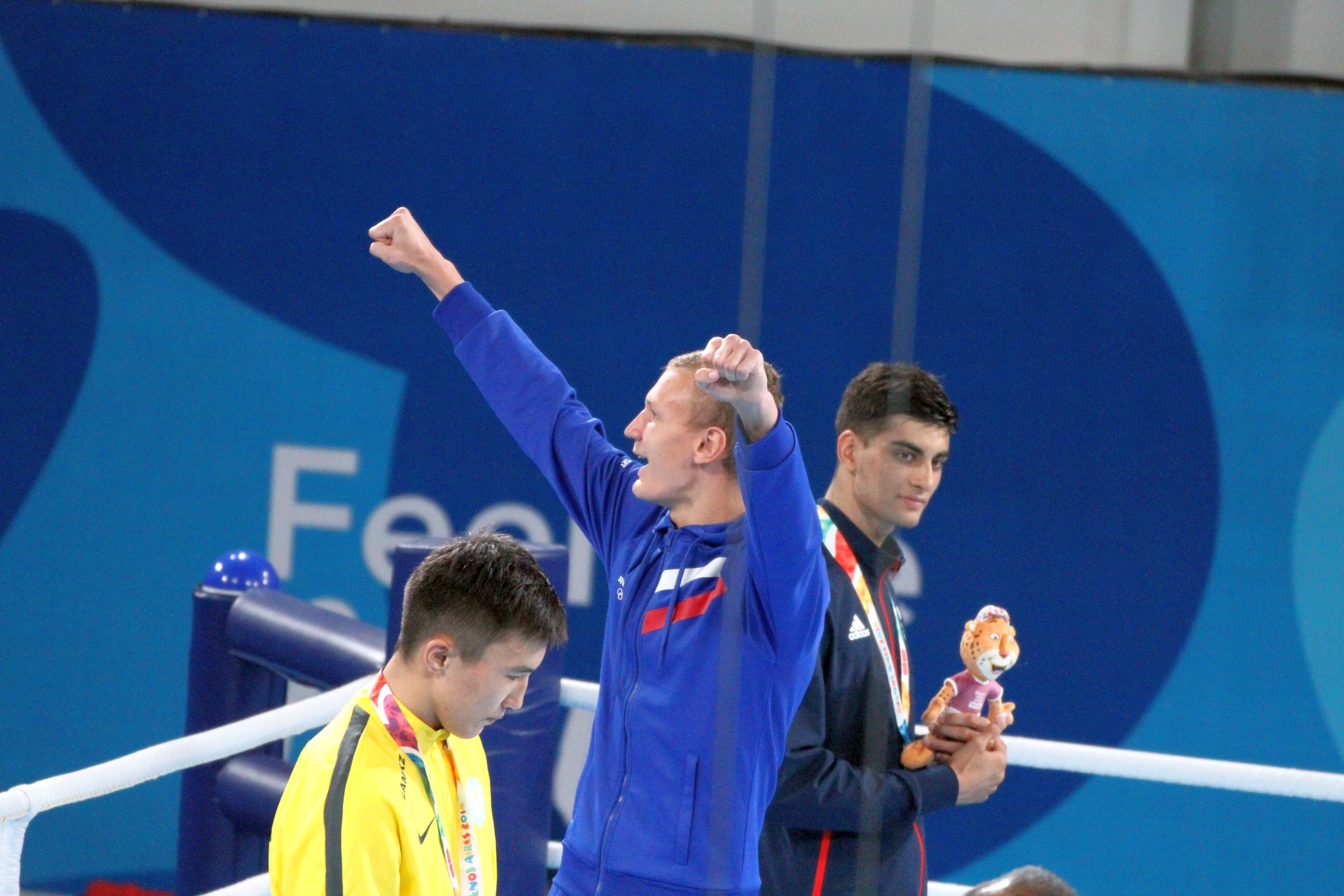
Boys' light welterweight Victory Ceremony

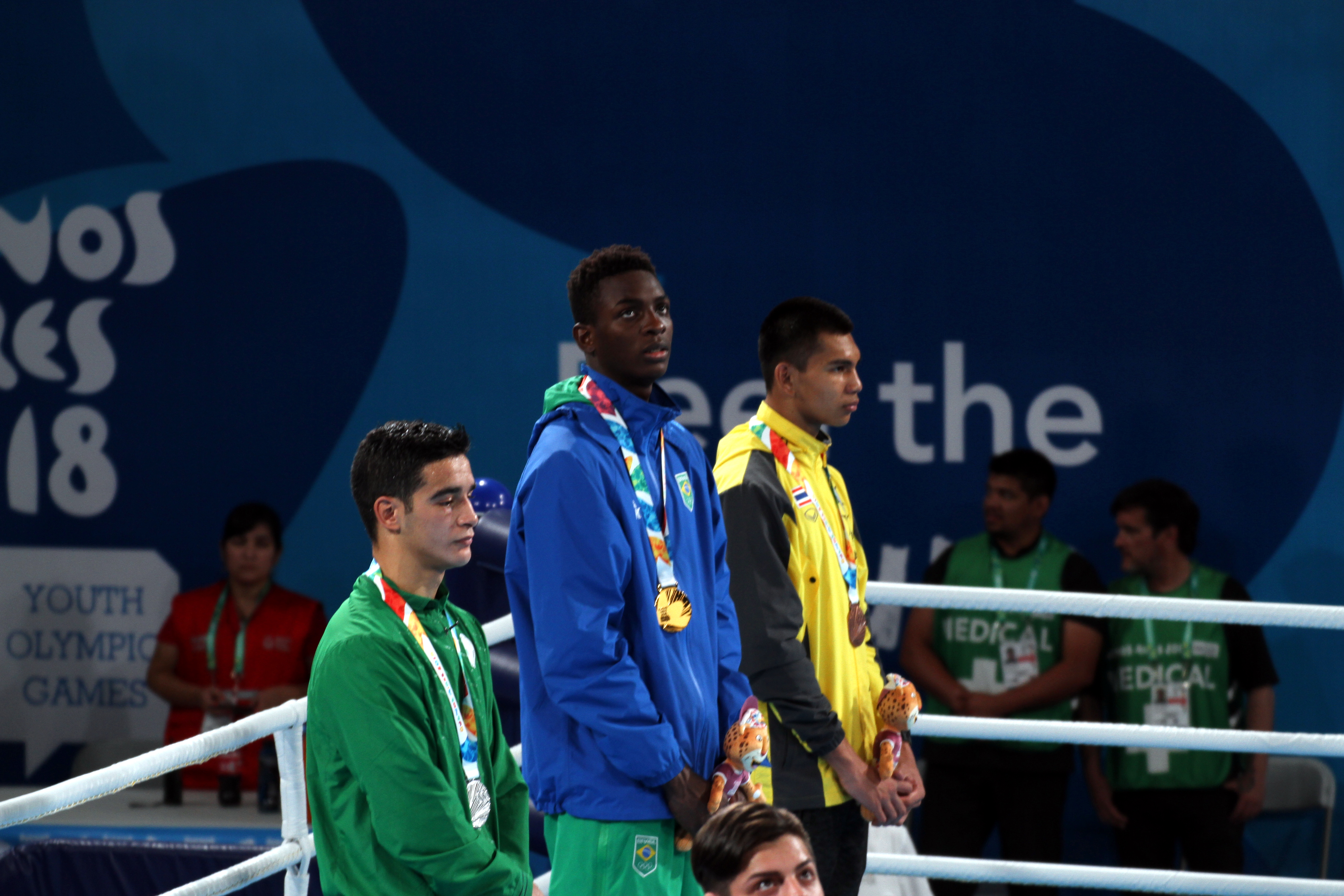
Boys' middleweight Victory Ceremony

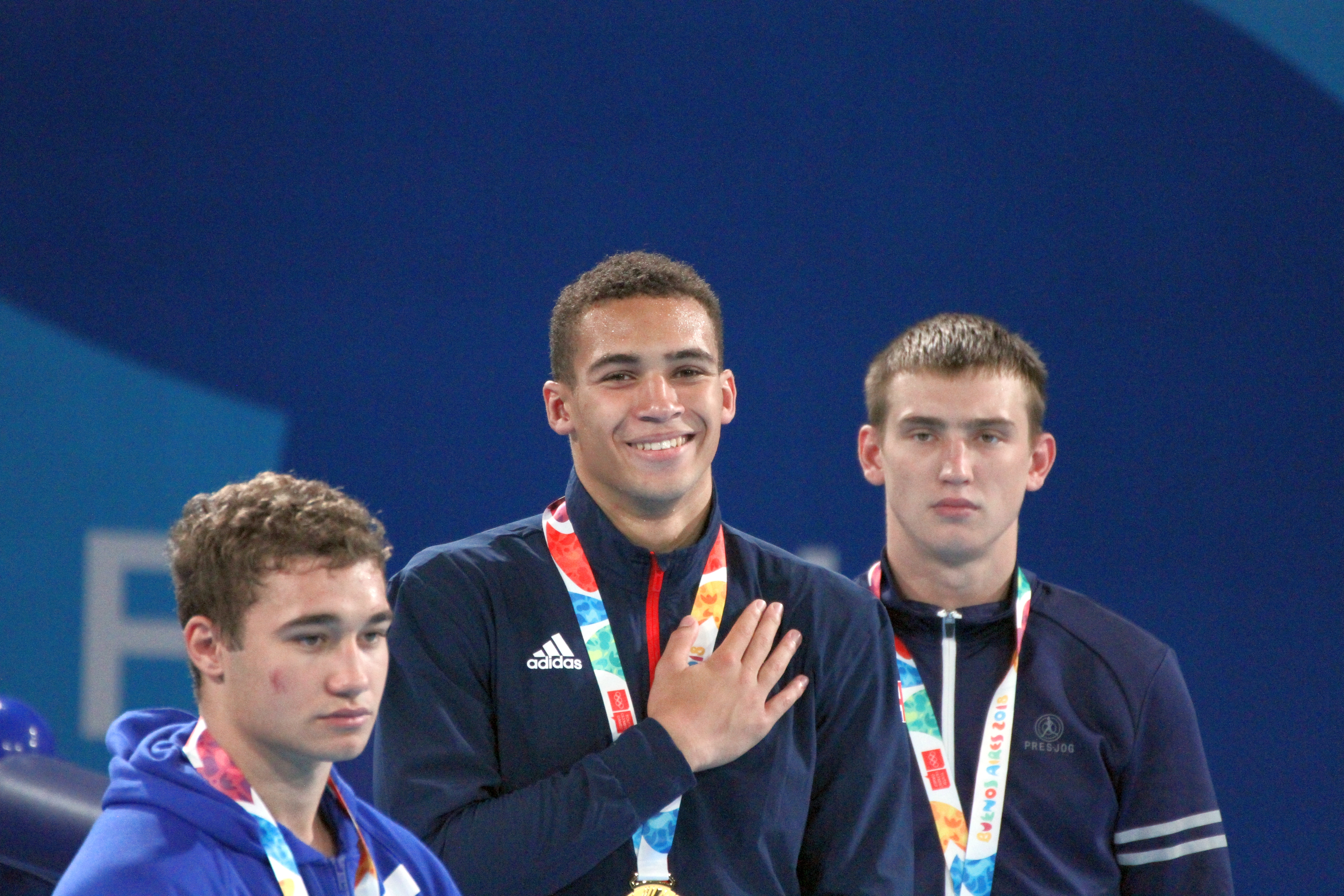
Boys' light heavyweight Victory Ceremony

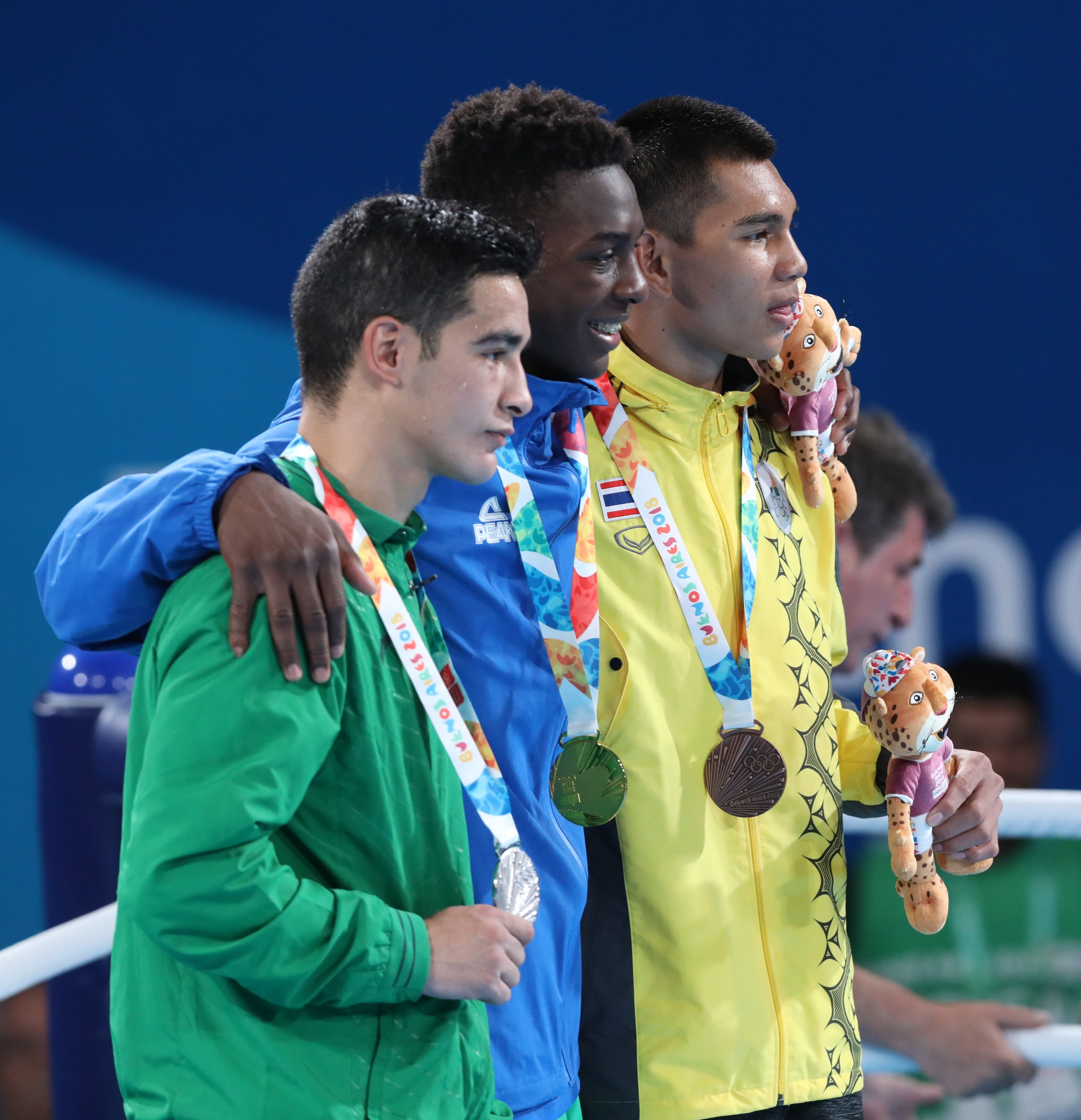
Boys' heavyweight Victory Ceremony

=== Girls' events ===
Event	Gold	Silver	Bronze
−51 kg	Martina La Piana; Italy	Adijat Gbadamosi; Nigeria	Heaven Garcia; United States
−57 kg	Panpatchara Somnuek; Thailand	Jennifer Carrillo; Mexico	Dearbhla Rooney; Ireland
−60 kg	Caroline Dubois; Great Britain	Porntip Buapa; Thailand	Oriana Saputo; Argentina
−75 kg	Anastasiia Shamonova; Russia	Tallya Brillaux; France	Nadezhda Ryabets; Kazakhstan

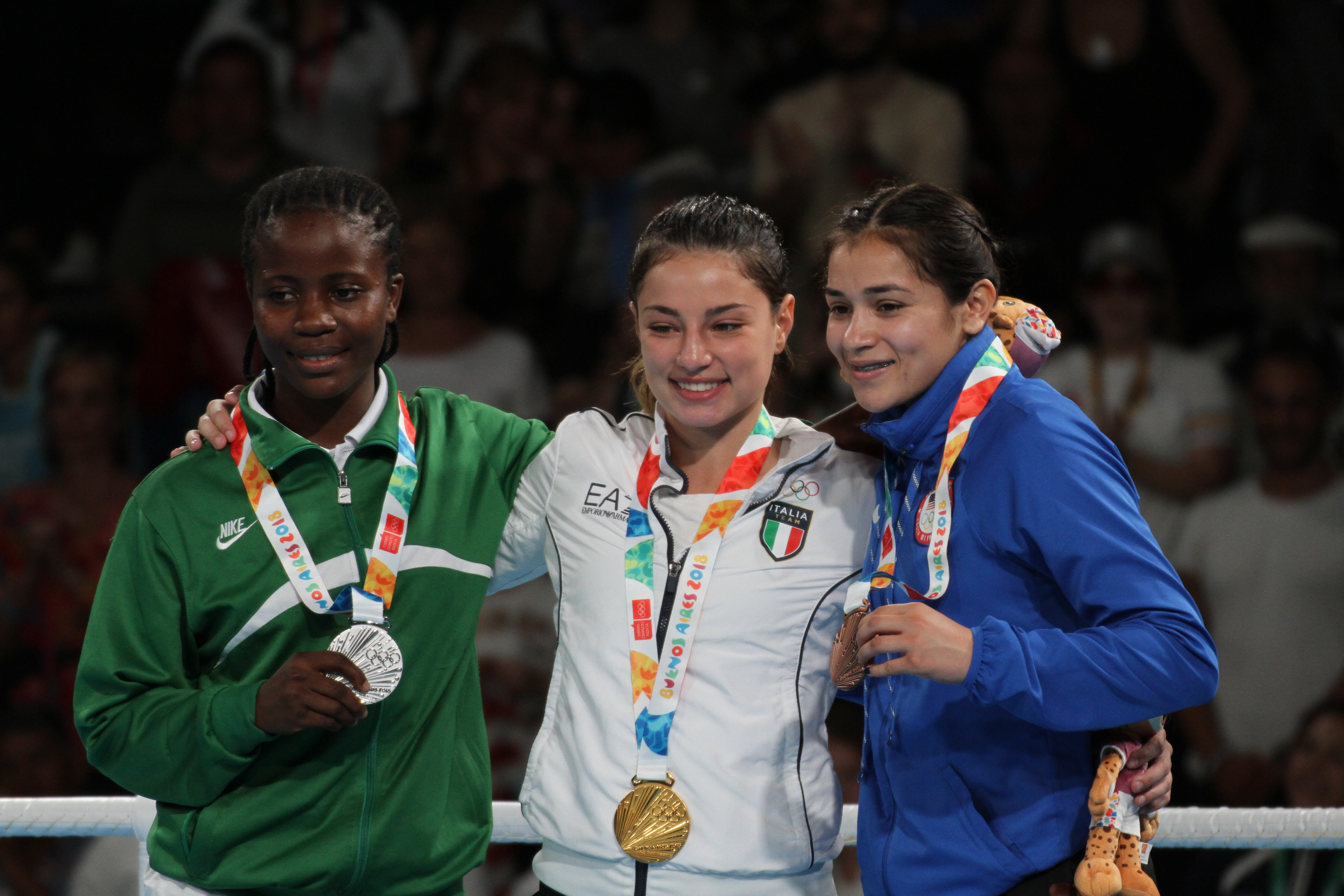
Girls' flyweight Victory Ceremony

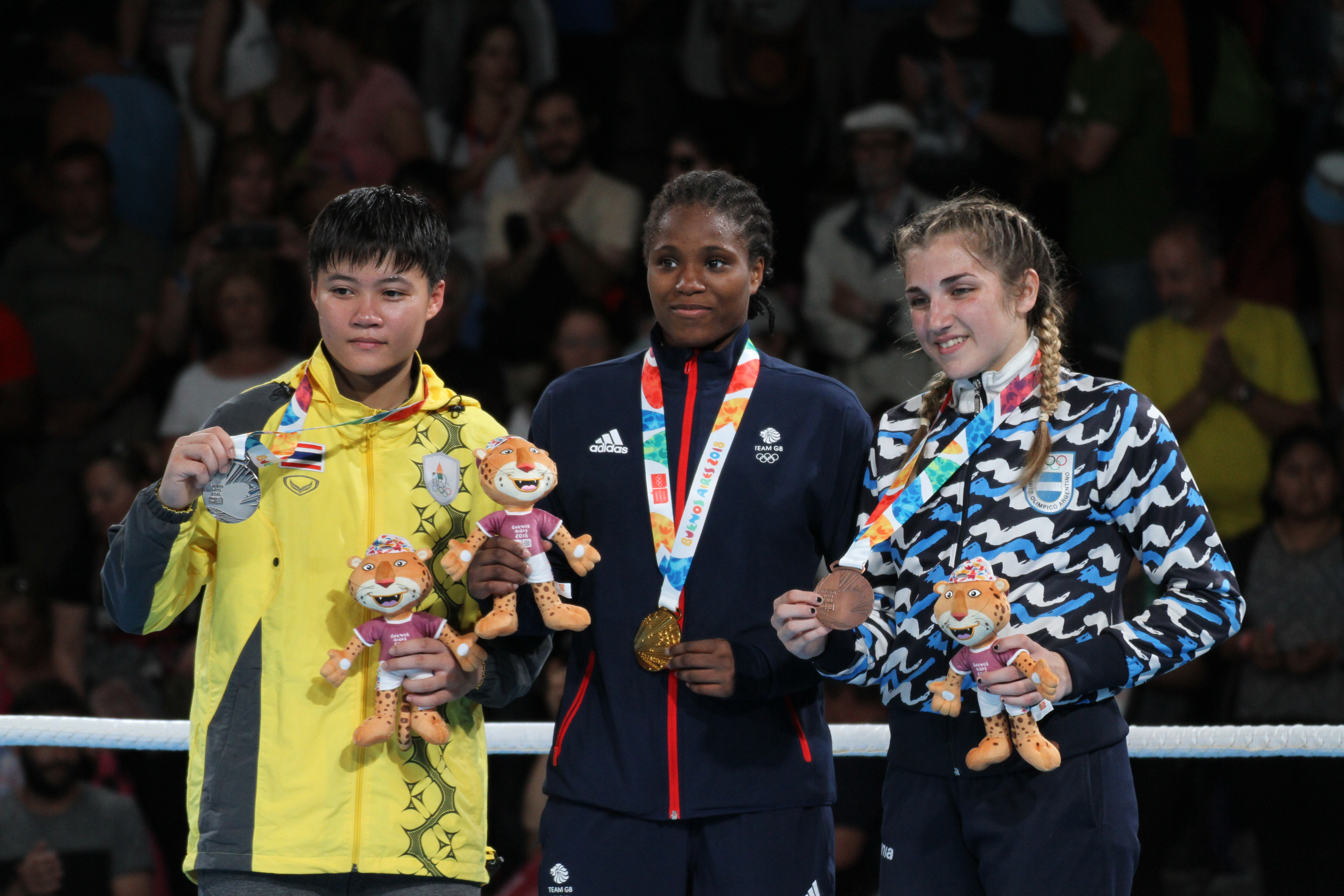
Girls' lightweight Victory Ceremony
