= Italy at the 2018 Summer Youth Olympics =

- IOC code: ITA
- NOC: Italian National Olympic Committee
- Website: http://www.coni.it/

in Buenos Aires, Argentina 6 – 18 October 2018
- Competitors: 83 in 29 sports
- Flag bearer: Davide Di Veroli
- Medals Ranked 5th: Gold 11 Silver 10 Bronze 13 Total 34

Summer Youth Olympics appearances
- 2010; 2014; 2018; 2026

Italy participated at the 2018 Summer Youth Olympics in Buenos Aires, Argentina from 6 October to 18 October 2018.

== Archery ==
Italy qualified one archer based on its performance at the 2017 World Archery Youth Championships.

Individual

Athlete	Event	Ranking round		Round of 32	Round of 16	Quarterfinals	Semifinals	Final / BM	Rank
Athlete	Event	Score	Seed	Opposition Score	Opposition Score	Opposition Score	Opposition Score	Opposition Score	Rank
Federico Fabrizzi	Boys' Individual	646	27	Ovchynnikov (UKR); L 2–6	Did not advance				17

Team

Athletes	Event	Ranking round		Round of 32	Round of 16	Quarterfinals	Semifinals	Final / BM	Rank
Athletes	Event	Score	Seed	Opposition Score	Opposition Score	Opposition Score	Opposition Score	Opposition Score	Rank
Federico Fabrizzi (ITA); Clea Reisenweber (GER)	Mixed team	1305	5	Jones (NZL); Tang (TPE); L 2–6	Did not advance				17

== Athletics ==
Italy qualified 13 athletes, based on 2018 European Athletics U18 Championships results.

- 400 m: Lorenzo Benati (Atl. Roma Acquacetosa)
- 3000 m: Francesco Guerra (RCF Roma Sud)
- 2000 m steeplechase: Carmelo Cannizzaro (Lib. Running Modica)
- 10,000 m race walking: Davide Finocchietti (Libertas Runners Livorno)
- Pole Vault: Ivan De Angelis (Fiamme Gialle Simoni)
- Long Jump: Davide Favro (Atl. Canavesana)
- Discus Throw: Enrico Saccomano (Atl. Malignani Libertas UD)
- Shot Put: Carmelo Musci (Aden Exprivia Molfetta)

Girls (5)

- 200 m: Dalia Kaddari (US Tespiense Quartu)
- 400 m hs: Emma Silvestri (Collection Atl. Sambenedettese)
- 5000m race walking: Simona Bertini (Asd Francesco Francia)
- High Jump: Idea Pieroni (Virtus CR Lucca)
- Discus Throw: Diletta Fortuna (Atl. Vicentina)

== Badminton ==
Italy qualified one player based on the Badminton Junior World Rankings.

Singles

Athlete	Event	Group stage				Quarterfinal	Semifinal	Final / BM	Rank
Athlete	Event	Opposition Score	Opposition Score	Opposition Score	Rank	Opposition Score	Opposition Score	Opposition Score	Rank
Giovanni Toti	Boys' Singles	Carraggi (BEL); W 2–1	Li (CHN); L 0–2	Toledano (ESP); L 0–2	4	Did not advance			9

Team

Athlete	Event	Group stage				Quarterfinal	Semifinal	Final / BM	Rank
Athlete	Event	Opposition Score	Opposition Score	Opposition Score	Rank	Opposition Score	Opposition Score	Opposition Score	Rank
Team Alpha; Giovanni Toti (ITA); Lakshya Sen (IND); Vannthoun Vath (CAM); Brian Yang (CAN); Hasini Nusaka Ambalangodage (SRI); Maria Delcheva (BUL); Jennie Gai (USA); Ashwathi Pillai (SWE)	Mixed Teams	Epsilon (MIX); W 110–98	Delta (MIX); L 99–110	Zeta (MIX); W 110–103	2 Q	Gamma (MIX); W 110–94	Theta (MIX); W 110–90	Omega (MIX); W 110–106	1st place, gold medalist(s)

== Basketball ==
Italy qualified a boys' team based on the U18 3x3 National Federation Ranking.

- Boys' tournament - 1 team of 4 athletes, Chinellato Riccardo, Donadio Lorenzo, Filoni Niccolò, Ianuale Nicolò;

But Italy took only 3 athletes to Buenos Aires. Italy were the only team to compete with only 3 players in the tournament. In spite of that they reached up to the quarter-final, where they lost to Ukraine in a thrilling contest.

Athlete	Event	Group stage					Quarterfinal	Semifinal	Final / BM
Athlete	Event	Opposition Score	Opposition Score	Opposition Score	Opposition Score	Rank	Opposition Score	Opposition Score	Opposition Score
Chinellato Riccardo; Donadio Lorenzo; Filoni Niccolò; Ianuale Nicolò	Boys' tournament	Latvia; W 19–10	Kazakhstan; W 21–12	Kyrgyzstan; W 21–6	Belgium; L 16–18	2 Q	Ukraine; L 11–14	Did not advance	

Skills Competition

Athlete	Event	Qualification		Final	
Athlete	Event	Points	Rank	Points	Rank
Niccolò Filoni	Boys' Dunk Contest	49	4	51	3rd place, bronze medalist(s)

== Beach handball ==
Athletes

- Alex Freund
- Max Prantner
- Giovanni Pavani
- Christian Mitterrutzner
- Davide Campestrini
- Davide Notarangelo
- Giovanni Cabrini
- Matteo Capuzzo
- Umberto Bronzo

== Beach volleyball ==
Italy qualified a girls' team based on their performance at 2017-18 European Youth Continental Cup Final.

- Girls' tournament - 1 team of 2 athletes, Bertozzi Nicol, Scampoli Claudia

Athlete	Event	Group stage		Round of 24	Round of 16	Quarterfinal	Semifinal	Final / BM	Rank
Athlete	Event	Opposition Score	Rank	Opposition Score	Opposition Score	Opposition Score	Opposition Score	Opposition Score	Rank
Scampoli–Bertozzi	Girls' tournament	Navas–Gonzalez (PUR); W 2-0; Giuli–Romi (PAR); W 2-1; Ravo–Tebeim (VAN); W 2-0	1	Bye	Aninha–Thamela (BRA); W 2-1	J.J. Zeng–Sh. T. Cao (CHN); W 2-0	Newberry–Sparks (USA); W 2-0	Voronina–Bocharova (RUS); L 0-2	2nd place, silver medalist(s)

== Boxing ==
Italy qualified one boxer based on its performance at the 2017 Youth Women's World Boxing Championships.

Boys

Athlete	Event	Preliminary R1	Preliminary R2	Semifinals	Final / RM	Rank
Athlete	Event	Opposition Result	Opposition Result	Opposition Result	Opposition Result	Rank
Naichel Millas	-75 kg	Jongjohor (THA); L 1–4	Machado (BRA); L WO	Did not advance	Jiménez (VEN); L WO	6

Girls

Athlete	Event	Preliminaries	Semifinals	Final / RM	Rank
Athlete	Event	Opposition Result	Opposition Result	Opposition Result	Rank
Martina La Piana	-51 kg	Gulia (IND); W 5-0	Garcia (USA); W 4–1	Gbadamosi (NGR); W 5–0	1st place, gold medalist(s)

== Canoeing ==
Italy qualified one boat based on its performance at the 2018 World Qualification Event.

- Girls' K1 - Zironi Lucrezia

Athlete	Event	Qualification		Repechage		Last 16	Quarterfinals	Semifinals	Final / BM	Rank
Athlete	Event	Time	Rank	Time	Rank	Opposition Result	Opposition Result	Opposition Result	Opposition Result	Rank
Lucrezia Zironi	Girls' K1 sprint	1:56.53	7	Bye		Delassus (FRA); W 2:01.62	Sukhanova (KAZ); L 1:54.56	Did not advance		
Lucrezia Zironi	Girls' K1 slalom	1:27.90	14	1:23.79	1	Luknárová (SVK); L 1:29.73	Did not advance			

== Cycling ==
Italy qualified a boys' and girls' combined team based on its ranking in the Youth Olympic Games Junior Nation Rankings.

- Boys' combined team - 1 team of 2 athletes
- Girls' combined team - 1 team of 2 athletes

== Dancesport ==
Italy qualified two dancers based on its performance at the 2018 World Youth Breaking Championship.

- B-Boys - Mattia Schinco a.k.a. Bad Matty
- B-Girls - Lexy

== Diving ==
Athlete	Event	Preliminary		Final	
Athlete	Event	Points	Rank	Points	Rank
Antonio Volpe	Boys' 3m springboard	509.05	7	515.15	7
Antonio Volpe	Boys' 10 m platform	405.95	11	453.35	8
Chiara Pellacani	Girls' 3m springboard	421.00	3	425.90	7
Chiara Pellacani (ITA); Oleh Serbin (UKR)	Mixed team	—N/a		333.40	6
Gabriela Agundes (MEX); Antonio Volpe (ITA)	Mixed team	—N/a		309.00	10

== Equestrian ==
Italy qualified a rider based on its performance at the FEI European Junior Jumping Championships.

- Individual Jumping - Giacomo Casadei 1 athlete

Athlete	Horse	Event	Round 1		Round 2			Total		Jump off		
Athlete	Horse	Event	Penalties	Rank	Penalties	Total	Rank	Penalties	Rank	Penalties	Total	Rank
Giacomo Casadei	Darna Z	Individual Jumping	0	1	0	1	0	0	1	0	0	1st place, gold medalist(s)
Europe; Jack Whitaker (GBR); Giacomo Casadei (ITA); Vince Jármy (HUN); Rowen van de Mheen (NED); Simon Jan Morssinkhof (BEL)	L V Chance Luck; Darna Z Walterstown Cruise Z Baral Ourika; Cheptel Wigan	Team Jumping	0; 0; 4 # 0; 0 #	0	4 # 0; 0; 0; 4 #	0	0	4 # 0 # 0; 0; 0	0	38.31 # 37.85 # 34.99; 34.79; 31.80	101.58	2nd place, silver medalist(s)

== Fencing ==
Italy qualified five athletes based on its performance at the 2018 Cadet World Championship but only three will compete.

- Boys' Épée - Davide Di Veroli (Italian flagbearer)
- Boys' Foil - Filippo Macchi
- Girls' Épée - Sara Kowalczyk (*)
- Girls' Foil - Martina Favaretto
- Girls' Sabre - Benedetta Taricco (*)

== Golf ==
Individual

Athlete	Event	Round 1		Round 2			Round 3			Bronze medal playoff	Total		
Athlete	Event	Score	Rank	Score	Total	Rank	Score	Total	Rank	Score	Score	Par	Rank
Alessia Nobilio	Girls' Individual	68 (−2)	1	72 (+2)	140	5	74 (+4)	214	12	3 (−1)	214	+4	2nd place, silver medalist(s)
Andrea Romano	Boys' Individual	69 (−1)	1	72 (+2)	141	10	74 (+4)	215	15	—N/a	215	+5	8

Team

Athletes	Event	Round 1 (Fourball)		Round 2 (Foursome)		Round 3 (Individual stroke)				Total		
Athletes	Event	Score	Rank	Score	Rank	Girl	Boy	Total	Rank	Score	Par	Rank
Alessia Nobilio; Andrea Romano	Mixed team	57 (−13)	1	72 (+2)	8	74	75	149 (+9)	21	278	−2	4

== Gymnastics ==
=== Artistic ===
Italy qualified two gymnasts based on its performance at the 2018 European Junior Championship.

- Boys' artistic individual all-around - 1 quota
- Girls' artistic individual all-around - 1 quota

Girls
Individual finals

Athlete	Event	Apparatus				Total	Rank
Athlete	Event	V	UB	BB	FX	Total	Rank
Giorgia Villa	All-around	14.566	14.000	12.300	13.200	54.066	1st place, gold medalist(s)
Giorgia Villa	Vault	14.233	—N/a				1st place, gold medalist(s)
Giorgia Villa	Uneven Bars	—N/a	14.166	—N/a			2nd place, silver medalist(s)
Giorgia Villa	Balance Beam	—N/a		12.966	—N/a		4
Giorgia Villa	Floor Exercise	—N/a			13.300	—N/a	1st place, gold medalist(s)

=== Rhythmic ===
Italy qualified one rhythmic gymnast based on its performance at the European qualification event.

- Girls' rhythmic individual all-around - 1 quota

== Judo ==
Individual

Athlete	Event	Round of 16	Quarterfinals	Semifinals	Rep 1	Rep 2	Rep 3	Final / BM	
Athlete	Event	Opposition Result	Opposition Result	Opposition Result	Opposition Result	Opposition Result	Opposition Result	Opposition Result	Rank
Veronica Toniolo	Girls' 52 kg	Noemí Huayhuameza (PER); W 10-00s2	Sairy Colón (PUR); W 10s1-00s1	Irena Khubulova (RUS); L 00-10	Bye			Nahomys Acosta (CUB); L 00s1-01s1	4

Team

Athletes	Event	Round of 16	Quarterfinals	Semifinals	Final	
Athletes	Event	Opposition Result	Opposition Result	Opposition Result	Opposition Result	Rank
Team Beijing; Artsiom Kolasau (BLR); Liu Li-ling (TPE); Jaykhunbek Nazarov (UZB); Carlos Páez (VEN); Itzel Pecha (MEX); Ana Viktorija Puljiz (CRO); Veronica Toniolo (ITA)	Mixed team	Team Montreal (MIX); W 5–2	Team Nanjing (MIX); W 4–3	Team London (MIX); W 7–0	Team Athens (MIX); W 4–3	1st place, gold medalist(s)

== Karate ==
Italy qualified one athlete based on the rankings in the Buenos Aires 2018 Olympic Standings.

- Boys' -68 kg - Rosario Ruggiero

Athlete	Event	Pool Matches				Semifinal	Final / BM	
Athlete	Event	Opposition Score	Opposition Score	Opposition Score	Rank	Opposition Score	Opposition Score	Rank
Rosario Ruggiero	Boys' 68 kg	Mahauden (BEL); L 0–3	Shyroian (UKR); W 3–0	Bošković (MNE); D 2–2	2	Yassine Sekouri (MAR); L 0–5	Did not advance	3rd place, bronze medalist(s)

== Modern pentathlon ==
Italy qualified two pentathletes based on its performance at the European Youth Olympic Games Qualifier. Italy qualified a second female based on its performance at the 2018 Youth A World Championship. The nation must choose between the two girls.

- Boys' Individual - Giorgio Malan
- Girls' Individual - Beatrice Mercuri or Alice Rinaudo

== Roller speed skating ==
Italy qualified two roller skaters based on its performance at the 2018 Roller Speed Skating World Championship.

- Boys' combined speed event - Vincenzo Maiorca
- Girls' combined speed event - Giorgia Valanzano

== Rowing ==
Italy qualified one boat based on its performance at the 2017 World Junior Rowing Championships. Later, Italy qualified a boys' pair boat based on its performance at the 2018 European Rowing Junior Championships.

- Boys' pair - 1 boat Castelnovo Nicolas, Zamariola Alberto
- Girls' pair – 1 boat Alajdi El Idrissi Khadija, Tonoli Vittoria

== Sailing ==
Italy qualified two boats based on its performance at the 2017 World Techno 293+ Championships. Italy qualified an additional boat based on its performance at the 2018 IKA Twin Tip Racing Youth World Championship. A Nacra 15 boat was qualified based on their performance at the 2018 Nacra 15 World Championships.

- Boys' Techno 293+ - 1 boat
- Girls' Techno 293+ - 1 boat
- Girls' IKA Twin Tip Racing - 1 boat
- Mixed Nacra 15 - 1 boat

== Shooting ==
Italy qualified one sport shooter based on its performance at the 2017 European Championships. Italy later qualified a rifle sport shooter based on its performance at the 2018 European Championships.

- Girls' 10m Air Rifle - 1 quota
- Girls' 10m Air Pistol - 1 quota

Individual

Athlete	Event	Qualification		Final	
Athlete	Event	Points	Rank	Points	Rank
Sofia Benetti	Girls' 10 m air pistol	621.3	8	143.0	7
Giulia Campostrini	Girls' 10 m air rifle	556-5	13	Did not advance	

Team

Athlete	Event	Qualification		Round of 16	Quarterfinal	Semifinal	Final	
Athlete	Event	Points	Rank	Opposition Score	Opposition Score	Opposition Score	Opposition Score	Rank
Giulia Campostrini (ITA); Rihards Zorge (LAT)	Mixed 10 metre air pistol	746-12	8	Haristiade (ROU); Solari (SUI); W 10-6	Ibarra Miranda (MEX); Honta (UKR); L 8-10	Did not advance		
Sofia Benetti (ITA); Muhammad Naufal Mahardika (INA)	Mixed 10 metre air rifle	820.5	12	Darwish (EGY); Hoberg (AUS); W 10-9	Kemppi (FIN); Firmapaz (ARG); L 5-10	Did not advance		

== Sport climbing ==
Italy qualified three sport climbers based on its performance at the 2017 World Youth Sport Climbing Championships. They also qualified a second female climber based on its performance at the 2017 European Youth Sport Climbing Championships.

- Boys' combined - 2 quotas (Filip Schenk, Pietro Biagini)
- Girls' combined - 2 quotas (Laura Rogora, Giorgia Tesio)

== Table tennis ==
Italy qualified two table tennis players based on its performance at the Road to Buenos Aires (Latin America) series.

- Boys' singles - Matteo Mutti
- Girls' singles - Jamila Laurenti

== Taekwondo ==
Athlete	Event	Round of 16	Quarterfinals	Semifinals	Final	
Athlete	Event	Opposition Result	Opposition Result	Opposition Result	Opposition Result	Rank
Gabriele Caulo	Boys' 63 kg	Bye	Hasham Bandar bin Dookhy (KSA); W 18-15	Nareupong Thepsen (THA); L 14-15	Did not advance	3rd place, bronze medalist(s)
Assunta Cennamo	Girls' 63 kg	Bye	Asma Haji (TUN); W 11-8	Nadica Božanić (SRB); L 4-16	Did not advance	3rd place, bronze medalist(s)

== Tennis ==
Singles

Athlete	Event	Round of 32	Round of 16	Quarterfinals	Semifinals	Final / BM	
Athlete	Event	Opposition Score	Opposition Score	Opposition Score	Opposition Score	Opposition Score	Rank
Lorenzo Musetti	Boys' singles	Jianu (ROU); L (4-6, 4-6)	Did not advance				17
Elisabetta Cocciaretto	Girls' singles	Bilokin (UKR); W (6-2, 6-4)	Osorio (COL); L (6-1, 6^{2}-7, 5-7)	Did not advance			9

Doubles

Athletes	Event	Round of 32	Round of 16	Quarterfinals	Semifinals	Final / BM	
Athletes	Event	Opposition Score	Opposition Score	Opposition Score	Opposition Score	Opposition Score	Rank
Lorenzo Musetti; Yankı Erel (TUR)	Boys' doubles	—N/a	Štyler (CZE) / Svrčina (CZE); L (4-6, 2-6)	Did not advance			9
Elisabetta Cocciaretto; Sylvie Zünd (LIE)	Girls' doubles	—N/a	Juvan (SLO) / Świątek (POL); L (0-6, 2-6)	Did not advance			9
Elisabetta Cocciaretto; Lorenzo Musetti	Mixed doubles	Ma (USA) / Baird (USA); W (7-5, 6-2)	Molinaro (LUX) / de Jong (NED); L (6-4, 2-6, [10-12])	Did not advance			9

== Triathlon ==
Italy qualified two athletes based on its performance at the 2018 European Youth Olympic Games Qualifier.

Individual

Athlete	Event	Swim (750m)	Trans 1	Bike (20 km)	Trans 2	Run (5 km)	Total Time	Rank
Alessio Crociani	Boys	9:29	0:27	26:52	0:28	16:29	53:45	3rd place, bronze medalist(s)
Chiara Lobba	Girls	10:37	0:46	31:15	0:30	18:54	1:02:02	16

Relay

Athlete	Event	Total Times per Athlete (Swim 250m, Bike 6.6 km, Run 1.8 km)	Total Group Time	Rank
Europe 1 Sif Bendix Madsen (DEN); Alessio Crociani (ITA); Anja Weber (SUI); Alexandre Montez (POR)	Mixed Relay	21:42 (1); 20:55 (3); 22:40 (1); 20:55 (1)	1:26:12	1st place, gold medalist(s)
Europe 5 Chiara Lobba (ITA); Loic Triponez (SUI); Alevtina Stetsenko (RUS); Itamar Shevach Levanon (ISR)	Mixed Relay	24:00 (14); 21:54 (10); 24:26 (8); 21:28 (4)	1:31:48	8

== Weightlifting ==
Italy qualified two athletes based on its performance at the 2017 World Youth Championships.

Boy

Athlete	Event	Snatch		Clean & jerk		Total	Rank
Athlete	Event	Result	Rank	Result	Rank	Total	Rank
Cristiano Ficco	−85 kg	145	1	180	1	325	1st place, gold medalist(s)

Girl

Athlete	Event	Snatch		Clean & jerk		Total	Rank
Athlete	Event	Result	Rank	Result	Rank	Total	Rank
Giulia Imperio	−48 kg	DNF					
