= Shooting at the 2018 Summer Youth Olympics – Mixed 10 metre air rifle =

Mixed 10 metre air rifle at the III Summer Youth Olympic Games
- Venue: Parque Sarmiento
- Dates: 10–11 October
- Competitors: 40 from 31 nations

Medalists
1st place, gold medalist(s)		Enkhmaa Erdenechuluun; Zalán Pekler	Mixed-NOCs
2nd place, silver medalist(s)		Anastasiia Dereviagina; Edson Ramírez	Mixed-NOCs
3rd place, bronze medalist(s)		Viivi Natalia Kemppi; Facundo Firmapaz	Mixed-NOCs

These are the results for the Mixed 10 metre air rifle event at the 2018 Summer Youth Olympics.

== Results ==
=== Qualification ===
Rank	Athlete	Points	Notes
1	Enkhmaa Erdenechuluun (MGL); Zalán Pekler (HUN)	828.4	Q
2	Zaynab Pardabaeva (UZB); Grigorii Shamakov (RUS)	827.0	Q
3	Victoria Rossiter (AUS); Hayk Babayan (ARM)	826.0	Q
4	Viivi Natalia Kemppi (FIN); Facundo Firmapaz (ARG)	825.9	Q
5	Farida Darwish (EGY); Alex Hoberg (AUS)	825.9	Q
6	Anastasiia Dereviagina (RUS); Edson Ramírez (MEX)	825.1	Q
7	Aoi Takagi (JPN); Maximilian Ulbrich (GER)	825.1	Q
8	Wiktoria Zuzanna Bober (POL); Miljan Dević (MNE)	823.5	Q
9	Alliana Volkart (ARG); Amirsiyavash Zolfagharian (IRI)	823.2	Q
10	Gabriela Martínez (MEX); Stefan Wadlegger (AUT)	823.0	Q
11	Marija Malić (SRB); Amar Dizdarević (BIH)	821.1	Q
12	Sofia Benetti (ITA); Muhammad Naufal Mahardika (INA)	820.5	Q
13	Wang Zeru (CHN); Plamen Emilov (BUL)	819.8	Q
14	Anna Janssen (GER); Chanidu Senanayake Mudiyanselage (SRI)	819.0	Q
15	Chen Yun-yun (TPE); Arnab Sharar (BAN)	815.5	Q
16	Amira Hamid (BAN); Zhang Changhong (CHN)	815.3	Q
17	Isidora Van de Perre (CHI); Aleksa Mitrović (SRB)	811.7	
18	Stephanie Grundsøe (DEN); Adriaan de Beer (RSA)	811.7	
19	Mehuli Ghosh (IND); Carlos Arze (PER)	809.9	
20	Latifa Al-Maazmi (UAE); Shahu Tushar Mane (IND)	803.2	

=== Draw ===
First round
1	Erdenechuluun (MGL); Pekler (HUN)	10
16	Hamid (BAN); Zhang (CHN)	7
9	Volkart (ARG); Zolfagharian (IRI)	10
8	Bober (POL); Dević (MNE)	9
4	Kemppi (FIN); Firmapaz (ARG)	10
13	Wang (CHN); Emilov (BUL)	9
12	Benetti (ITA); Mahardika (INA)	10
5	Darwish (EGY); Hoberg (AUS)	6
11	Malić (SRB); Dizdarević (BIH)	4
6	Dereviagina (RUS); Ramírez (MEX)	10
14	Janssen (GER); Mudiyanselage (SRI)	9
3	Rossiter (AUS); Babayan (ARM)	10
7	Takagi (JPN); Ulbrich (GER)	7
10	Martínez (MEX); Wadlegger (AUT)	10
15	Chen (TPE); Sharar (BAN)	10
2	Pardabaeva (UZB); Shamakov (RUS)	7

Quarter-finals
1	Erdenechuluun (MGL); Pekler (HUN)	10
9	Volkart (ARG); Zolfagharian (IRI)	9
4	Kemppi (FIN); Firmapaz (ARG)	10
12	Benetti (ITA); Mahardika (INA)	5
6	Dereviagina (RUS); Ramírez (MEX)	10
3	Rossiter (AUS); Babayan (ARM)	4
10	Martínez (MEX); Wadlegger (AUT)	10
15	Chen (TPE); Sharar (BAN)	8

Semi-finals
1	Erdenechuluun (MGL); Pekler (HUN)	10
4	Kemppi (FIN); Firmapaz (ARG)	5
6	Dereviagina (RUS); Ramírez (MEX)	10
10	Martínez (MEX); Wadlegger (AUT)	8

Final
1	Erdenechuluun (MGL); Pekler (HUN)	10
6	Dereviagina (RUS); Ramírez (MEX)	9
Bronze medal match
4	Kemppi (FIN); Firmapaz (ARG)	10
10	Martínez (MEX); Wadlegger (AUT)	7
