= Boxing at the 2018 Summer Youth Olympics – Girls' flyweight =

Boxing competitions

Girls' flyweight boxing at the III Summer Youth Olympic Games
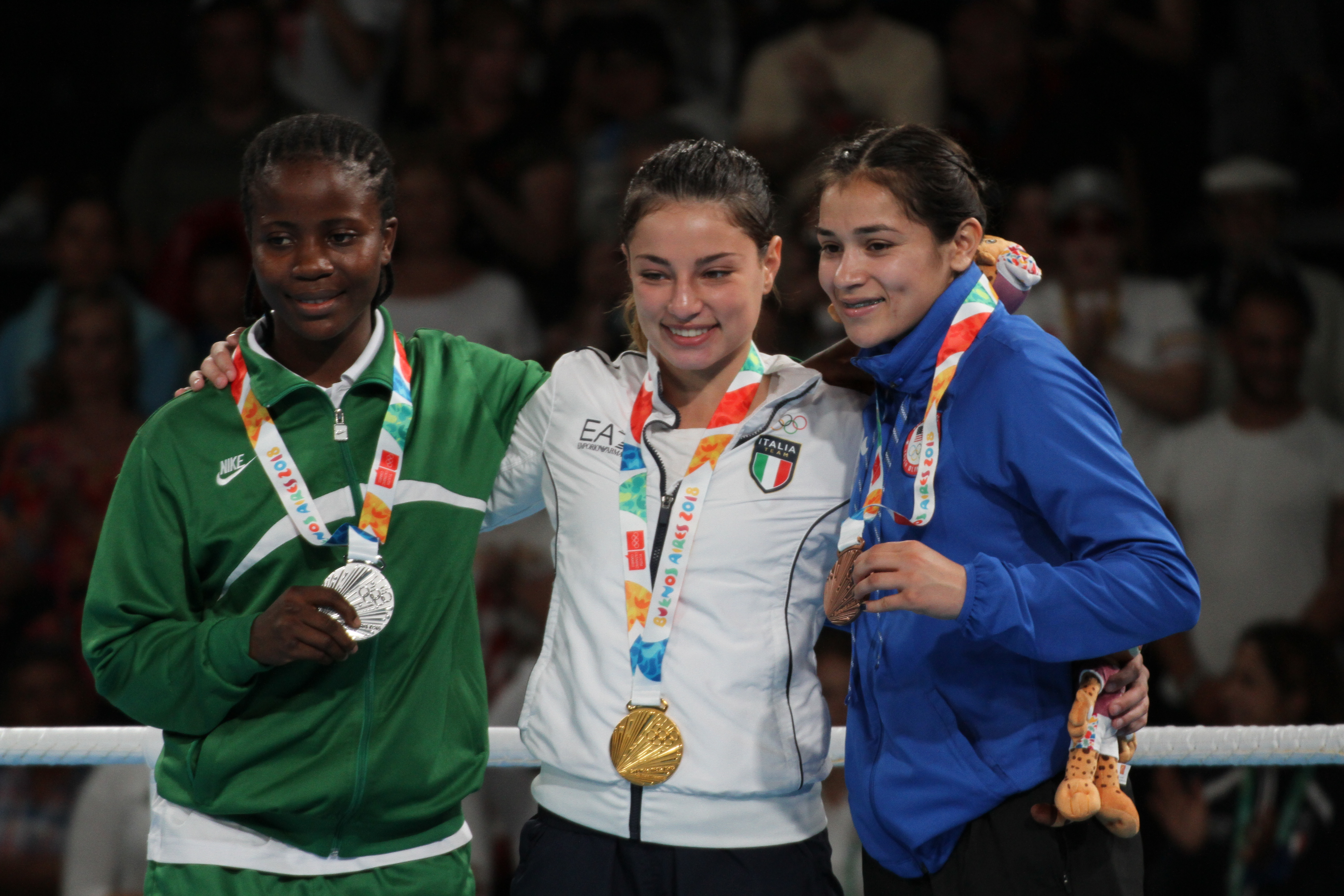
- The Olympic medalists of the Girls' flyweight event.
- Venue: Oceania Pavilion
- Date: 15–18 October
- Competitors: 7 from 7 nations

Medalists
1st place, gold medalist(s)		Martina La Piana	Italy
2nd place, silver medalist(s)		Adijat Gbadamosi	Nigeria
3rd place, bronze medalist(s)		Heaven Garcia	United States

The girls' flyweight boxing competition at the 2018 Summer Youth Olympics in Buenos Aires was held from 15 to 18 October at the Oceania Pavilion.

== Schedule ==
All times are local (UTC−3).

Date	Time	Round
Monday, 15 October	19:33	Preliminaries
Tuesday, 16 October	20:02	Semifinals
Thursday, 18 October	15:51	Finals

== Results ==
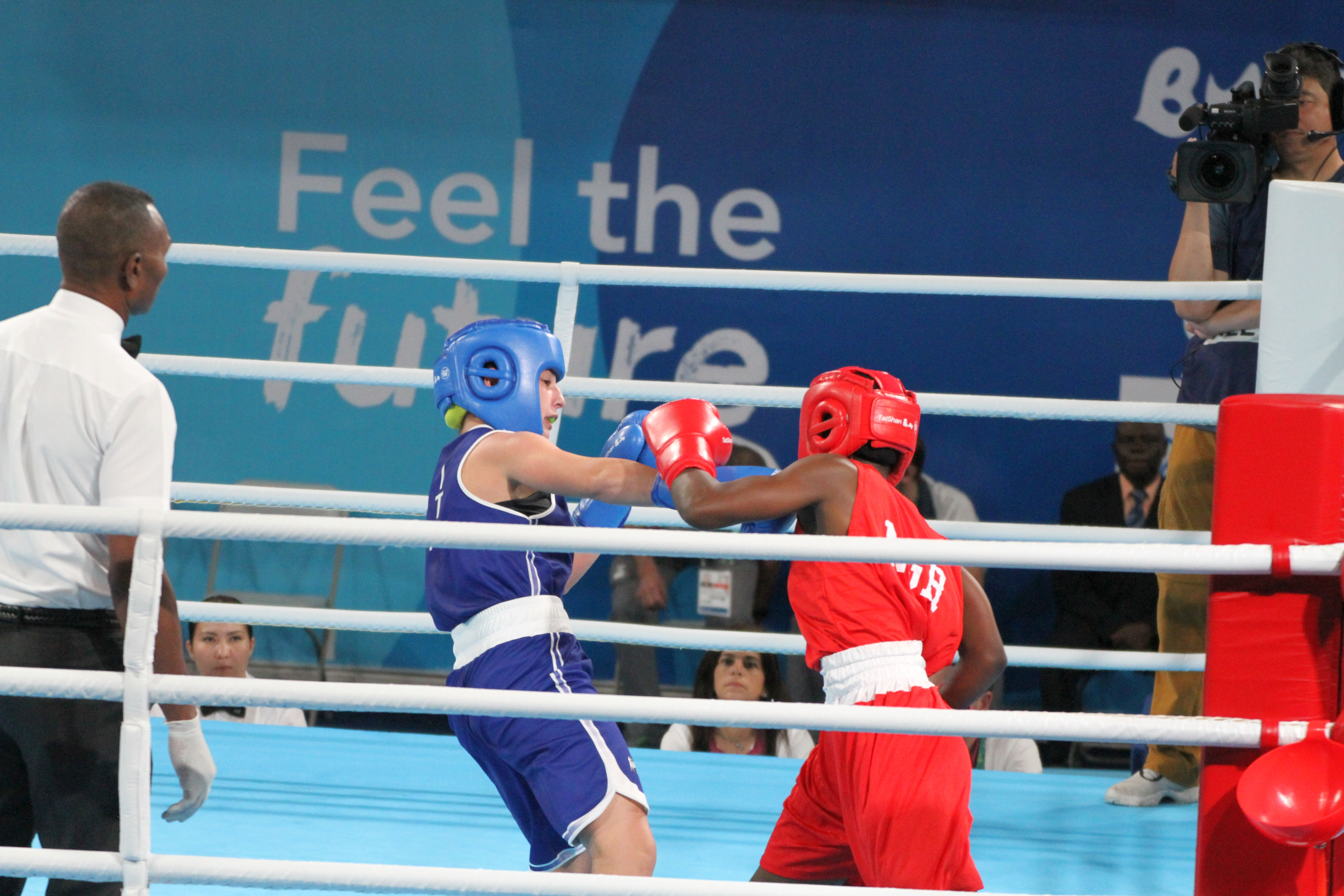
Gold Medal Bout La Piana vs Gbadamosi

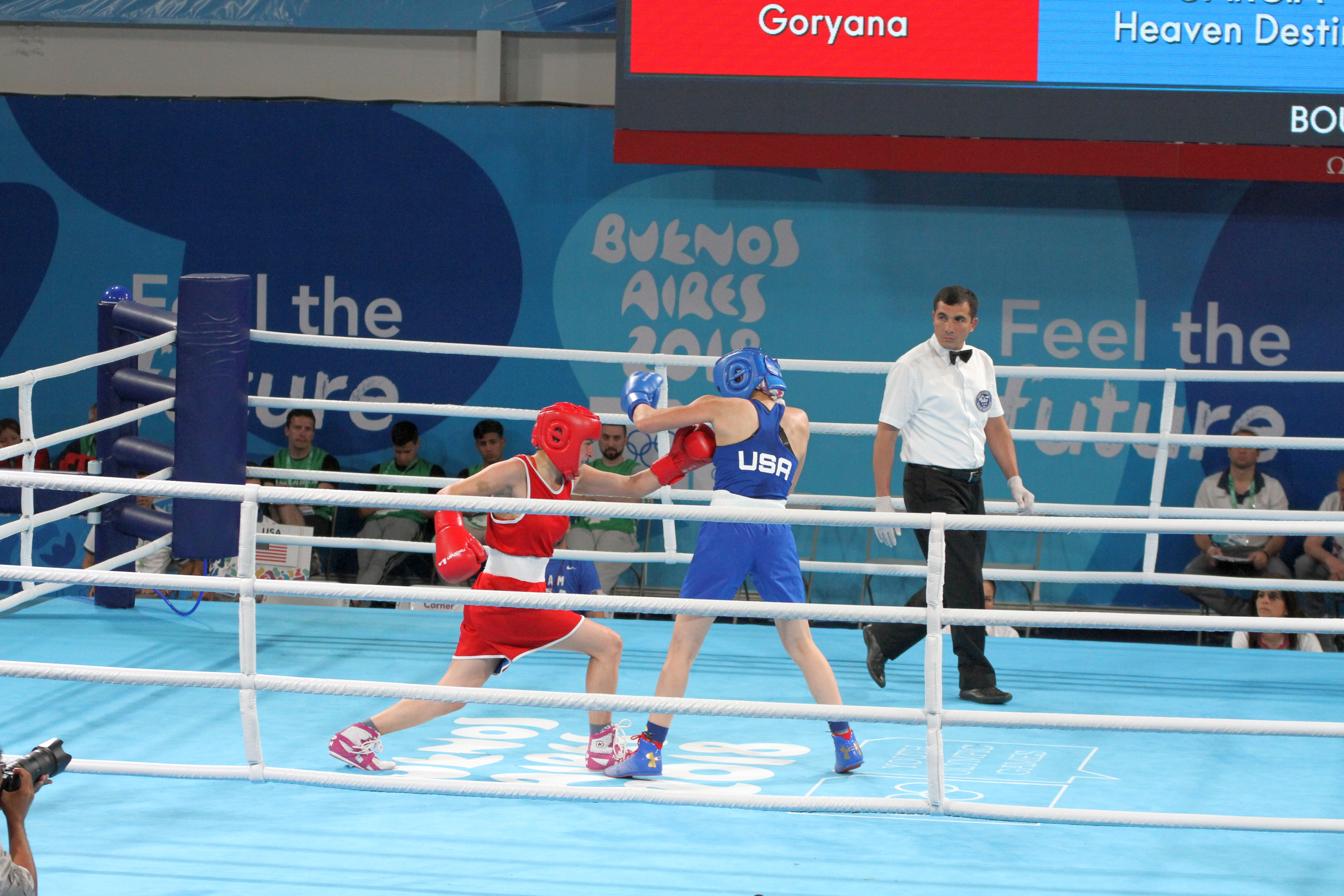
Bronze Medal Bout Garcia vs Stoeva

Preliminaries
Goryanana Stoeva (BUL)	5
Khursandoy Kholmatova (UZB)	0
Zhansaya Abdraimova (KAZ)	2
Heaven Garcia (USA)	3
Martina La Piana (ITA)	5
Jyoti Gulia (IND)	0

Semifinals
Adijat Gbadamosi (NGR)	4
Goryanana Stoeva (BUL)	1
Heaven Garcia (USA)	1
Martina La Piana (ITA)	4

Final
Adijat Gbadamosi (NGR)	0
Martina La Piana (ITA)	5
Third place
Goryanana Stoeva (BUL)	0
Heaven Garcia (USA)	5
