= Alliana =

Alliana can be a feminine given name or a surname. Notable people with the name include:

- Alliana Volkart (born 2000), Argentine sport shooter
- Pedro Alliana, President of Paraguay since 2026
