= Montenegro at the 2018 Summer Youth Olympics =

- IOC code: MNE
- NOC: Montenegrin Olympic Committee
- Website: http://www.cok.me

in Buenos Aires, Argentina 6 – 18 October 2018
- Competitors: 2 in 2 sports
- Flag bearer: Bojan Bošković
- Medals: Gold 0 Silver 0 Bronze 0 Total 0

Summer Youth Olympics appearances
- 2010; 2014; 2018

Montenegro participated at the 2018 Summer Youth Olympics in Buenos Aires, Argentina from 6 October to 18 October 2018.

== Competitors ==
Sport	Boy	Girl	Total
Karate	1	0	1
Shooting	1	0	1

== Karate ==
Montenegro was given a quota by the tripartite committee to compete in karate.

Boys

Athlete	Event	Pool Matches				Semifinal	Final / BM	
Athlete	Event	Opposition Score	Opposition Score	Opposition Score	Rank	Opposition Score	Opposition Score	Rank
Bojan Bošković	Boys' 68 kg	Mahauden (BEL); L 0–2	Shyroian (UKR); W 3–0	Ruggiero (ITA); L 2–2*	3	did not advance		

== Shooting ==
Montenegro was given a quota by the tripartite committee to compete in shooting.

Individual

Athlete	Event	Qualification		Final	
Athlete	Event	Points	Rank	Points	Rank
Miljan Dević	Boys' 10m air rifle	617.0	11	did not advance	

Team

Athletes	Event	Qualification		Round of 16	Quarterfinals	Semifinals	Final / BM	Rank
Athletes	Event	Points	Rank	Opposition Result	Opposition Result	Opposition Result	Opposition Result	Rank
Miljan Dević (MNE); Wiktoria Zuzanna Bober (POL)	Mixed Team 10m Air Rifle	823.5	8 Q	Volkart (ARG); Zolfagharian (IRI); L 9–10	did not advance			12
