= Karate at the 2018 Summer Youth Olympics – Boys' 68 kg =

Karate competition

Boys' Kumite 68 kg at the III Summer Youth Olympic Games
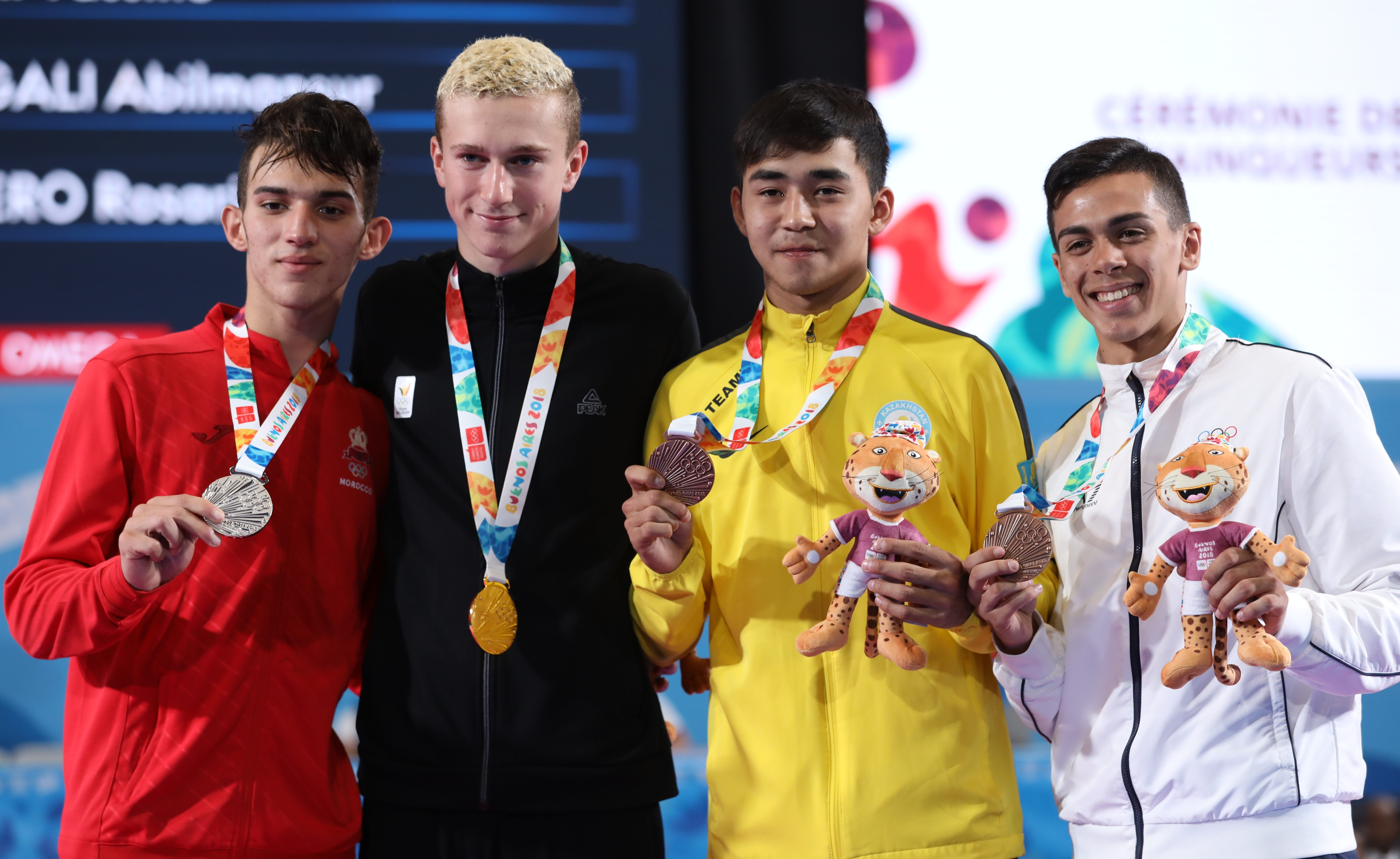
- Venue: Europa Pavilion
- Date: 18 October
- Competitors: 8 from 8 nations

Medalists
1st place, gold medalist(s)		Quentin Mahauden	Belgium
2nd place, silver medalist(s)		Yassine Sekouri	Morocco
3rd place, bronze medalist(s)		Abilmansur Batyrgali	Kazakhstan
3rd place, bronze medalist(s)		Rosario Ruggiero	Italy

The boys' kumite –68 kg competition at the 2018 Summer Youth Olympics was held on 18 October at the Europa Pavilion in Buenos Aires, Argentina.

== Schedule ==
All times are in local time (UTC-3).

Date	Time	Round
Thursday, 18 October	09:00	Elimination round
Thursday, 18 October	14:00	Semifinals
Thursday, 18 October	14:42	Final

== Results ==
=== Elimination round ===
==== Pool A ====
Rank	Athlete	B	W	D	L	Pts	Score
1	Quentin Mahauden (BEL)	3	2	1	0	5	9–6
2	Rosario Ruggiero (ITA)	3	1	1	1	3	11–9
3	Bojan Bošković (MNE)	3	1	1	1	3	5–4
4	Robert Shyroian (UKR)	3	0	1	2	1	0–6

	Score	
Rosario Ruggiero (ITA)	3–0	Robert Shyroian (UKR)
Bojan Bošković (MNE)	0–2	Quentin Mahauden (BEL)
Bojan Bošković (MNE)	3–0	Robert Shyroian (UKR)
Rosario Ruggiero (ITA)	6–7	Quentin Mahauden (BEL)
Quentin Mahauden (BEL)	0–0	Robert Shyroian (UKR)
Rosario Ruggiero (ITA)	2–2	Bojan Bošković (MNE)

==== Pool B ====
Rank	Athlete	B	W	D	L	Pts	Score
1	Yassine Sekouri (MAR)	3	2	1	0	5	9–2
2	Abilmansur Batyrgali (KAZ)	3	2	1	0	5	6–0
3	Kotaro Nakamura (JPN)	3	0	1	2	1	2–11
4	Juan Salsench (ARG)	3	0	1	2	1	0–4

	Score	
Abilmansur Batyrgali (KAZ)	3–0	Juan Salsench (ARG)
Yassine Sekouri (MAR)	8–2	Kotaro Nakamura (JPN)
Yassine Sekouri (MAR)	1–0	Juan Salsench (ARG)
Abilmansur Batyrgali (KAZ)	3–0	Kotaro Nakamura (JPN)
Kotaro Nakamura (JPN)	0–0	Juan Salsench (ARG)
Abilmansur Batyrgali (KAZ)	0–0	Yassine Sekouri (MAR)

=== Semifinals ===
	Score	
Quentin Mahauden (BEL)	3–1	Abilmansur Batyrgali (KAZ)
Yassine Sekouri (MAR)	5–0	Rosario Ruggiero (ITA)

=== Final ===
	Score	
Quentin Mahauden (BEL)	1–0	Yassine Sekouri (MAR)

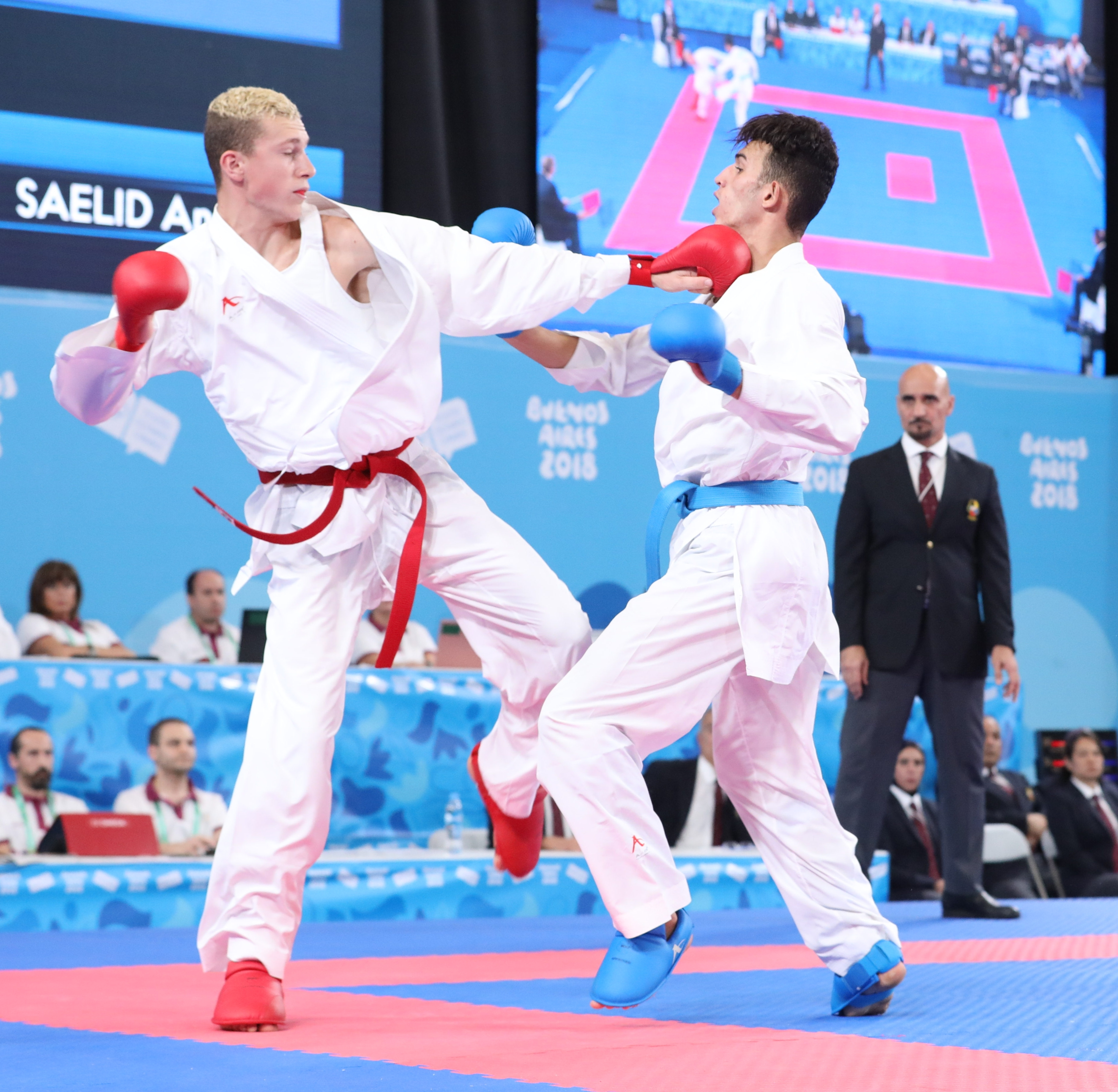
Quentin Mahauden versus Yassine Sekouri

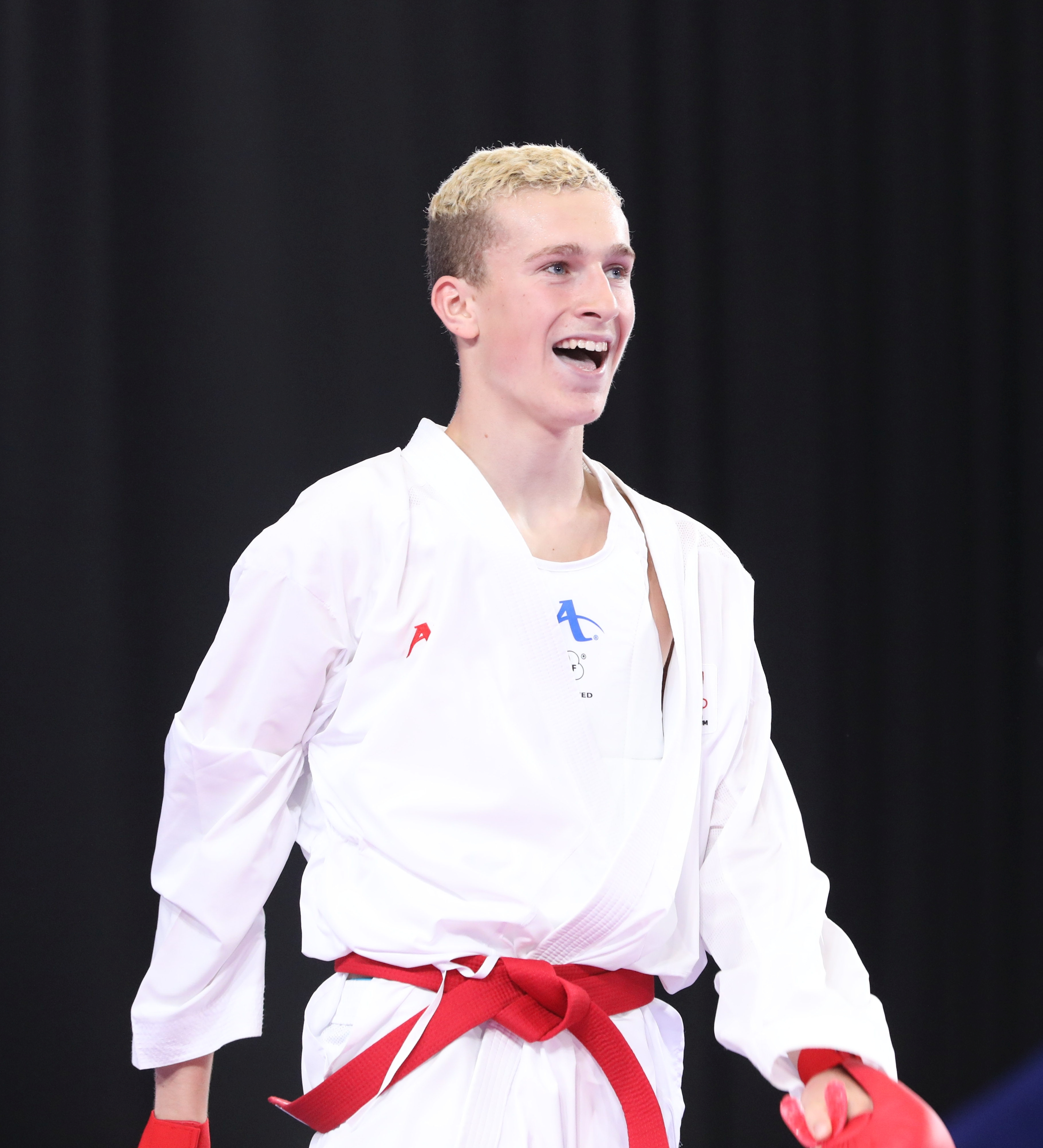
Quentin Mahauden celebrating his victory

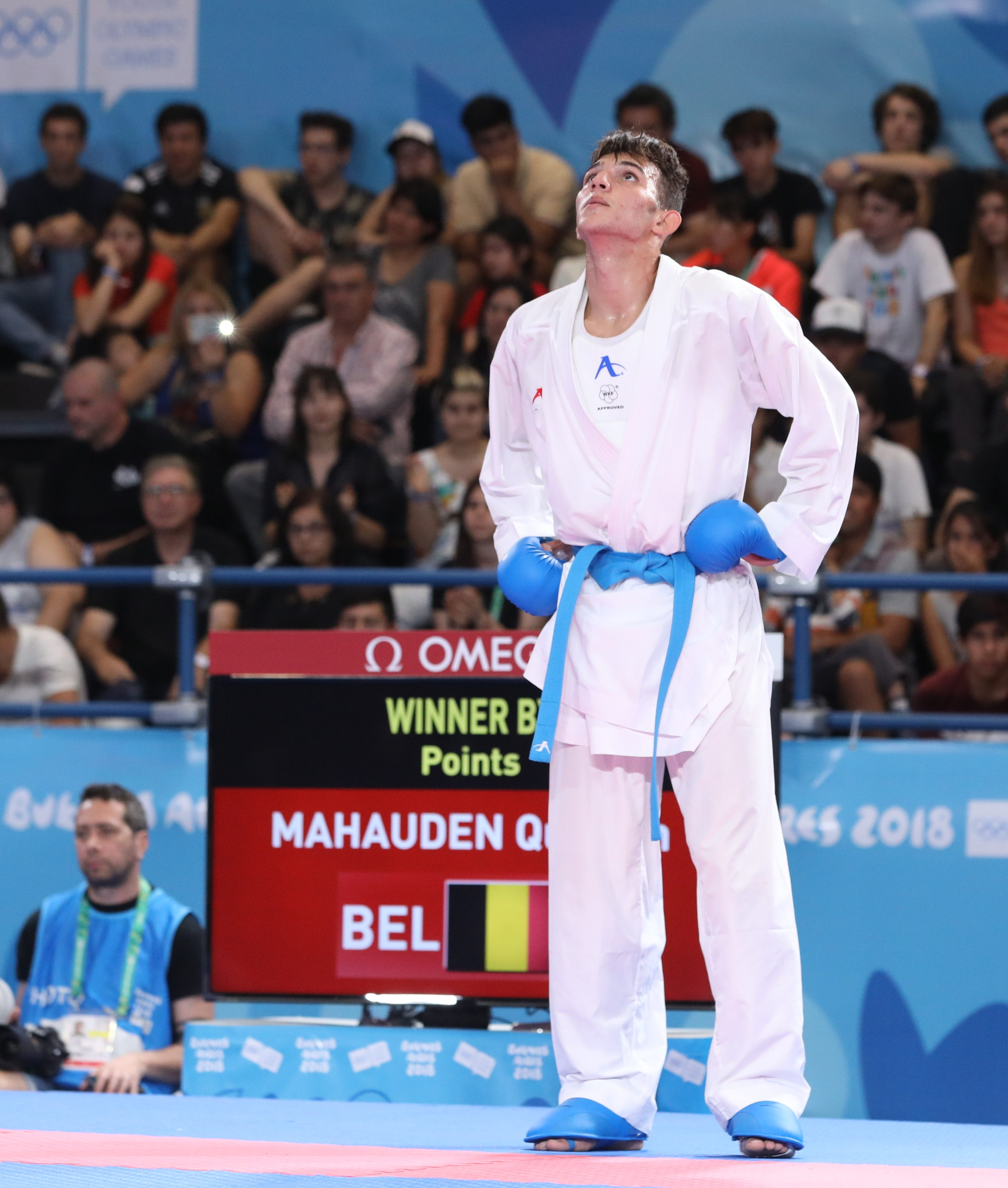
Yassine Sekouri disappointed after losing the fight
