= Nadezhda Ryabets =

Kazakhstani boxer (born 2000)

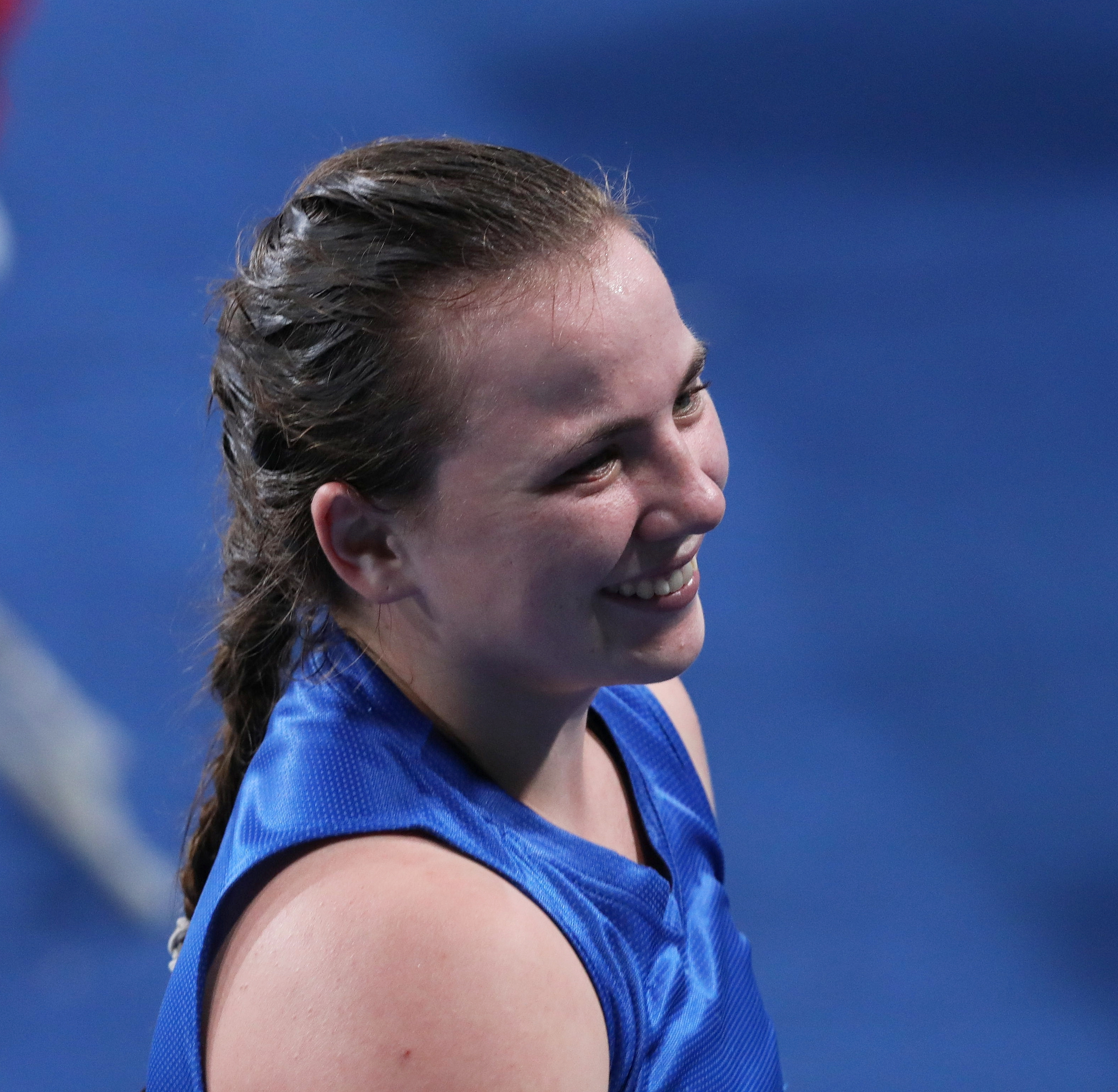
- Ryabets at the 2018 Youth Olympics

Personal information
- Nationality: Ukraine
- Born: 14 September 2000 (age 25) Vozvyshenka, North Kazakhstan, Kazakhstan
- Height: 165 cm (5 ft 5 in)
- Weight: 75 kg (165 lb)

Sport
- Sport: Boxing
- Weight class: Middleweight
Medal record
Women's amateur boxing
Representing Kazakhstan
World Championships
Bronze medal – third place	2023 New Delhi	Welterweight
Youth Olympic Games
Bronze medal – third place	2018 Buenos Aires	Middleweight

Nadezhda Ryabets (Надежда Рябец, born 14 September 2000) is a Kazakhstani boxer. In June 2020, she became the only Kazakhstani female boxer to qualify for the Tokyo Summer Olympics, in the middleweight category.

Nadezhda Ryabets started boxing in 2010. In 2015, she earned the gold medal at the Taipei 2015 AIBA Women's Junior World Boxing Championships and won the ASBC Asian Youth Boxing Championships in Bangkok in 2018.
