= Boxing at the 2018 Summer Youth Olympics – Girls' middleweight =

Boxing competitions

Girls' middleweight boxing at the III Summer Youth Olympic Games
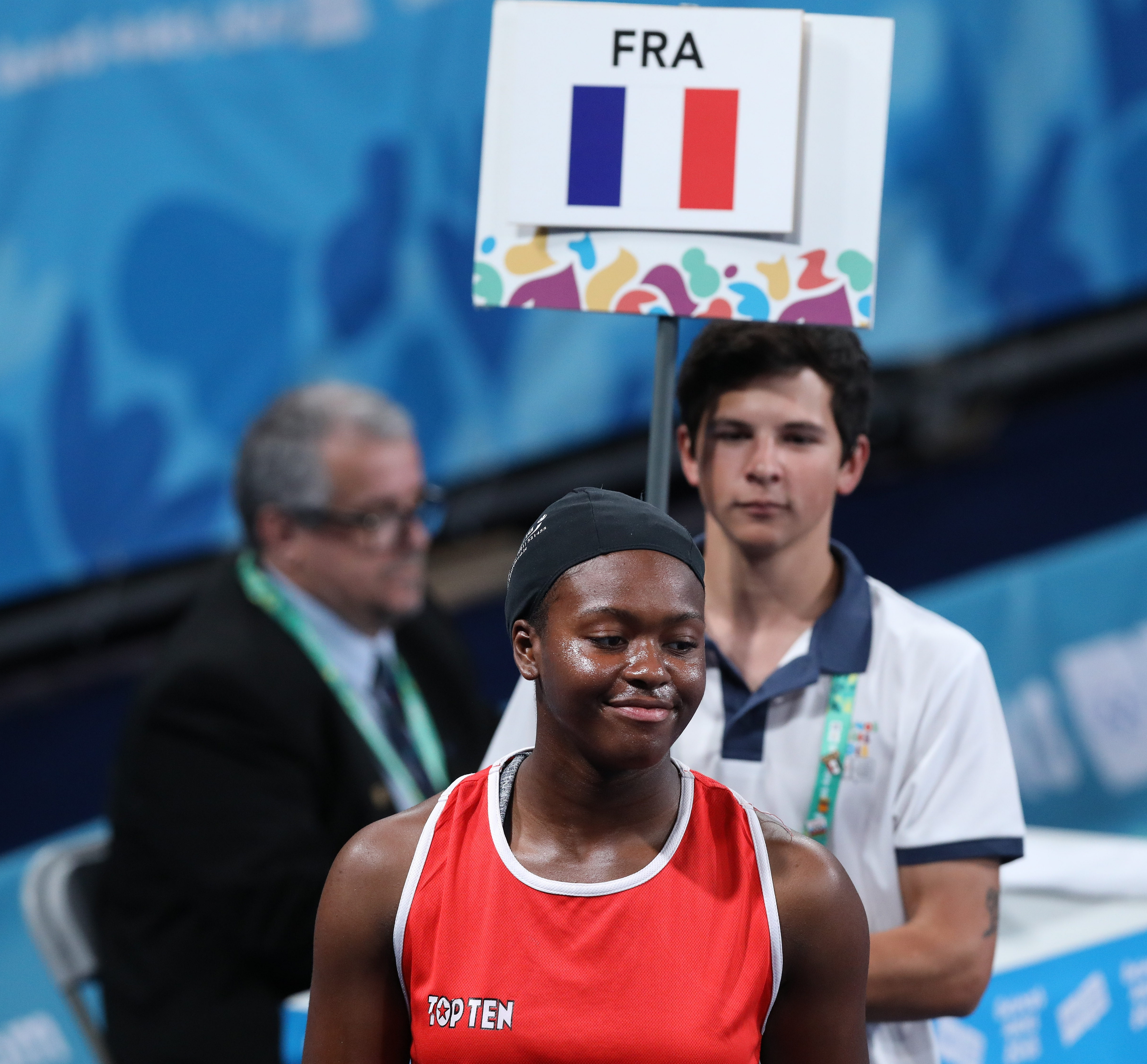
- Silver medallist Tallya Brillaux (France) during the walk-in
- Venue: Oceania Pavilion
- Date: 14–17 October
- Competitors: 7 from 7 nations

Medalists
1st place, gold medalist(s)		Anastasiia Shamonova	Russia
2nd place, silver medalist(s)		Tallya Brillaux	France
3rd place, bronze medalist(s)		Nadezhda Ryabets	Kazakhstan

The girls' middleweight boxing competition at the 2018 Summer Youth Olympics in Buenos Aires was held from 14 to 17 October at the Oceania Pavilion.

== Schedule ==
All times are local (UTC−3).

Date	Time	Round
Sunday, 14 October	15:28	Preliminaries
Tuesday, 16 October	15:58	Semifinals
Wednesday, 17 October	20:51	Finals

== Results ==
Preliminaries
Tallya Brillaux (FRA)	5
Elsidita Selaj (ALB)	0
Nadezhda Ryabets (KAZ)	5
Natalia Gajewska (POL)	0
Anastasiia Shamonova (RUS)	5
Lauren Kelly (IRL)	0

Semifinals
Ichrak Chaib (ALG)	0
Tallya Brillaux (FRA)	5
Nadezhda Ryabets (KAZ)	0
Anastasiia Shamonova (RUS)	5

Final
Tallya Brillaux (FRA)	2
Anastasiia Shamonova (RUS)	3
Third place
Ichrak Chaib (ALG)	0
Nadezhda Ryabets (KAZ)	5

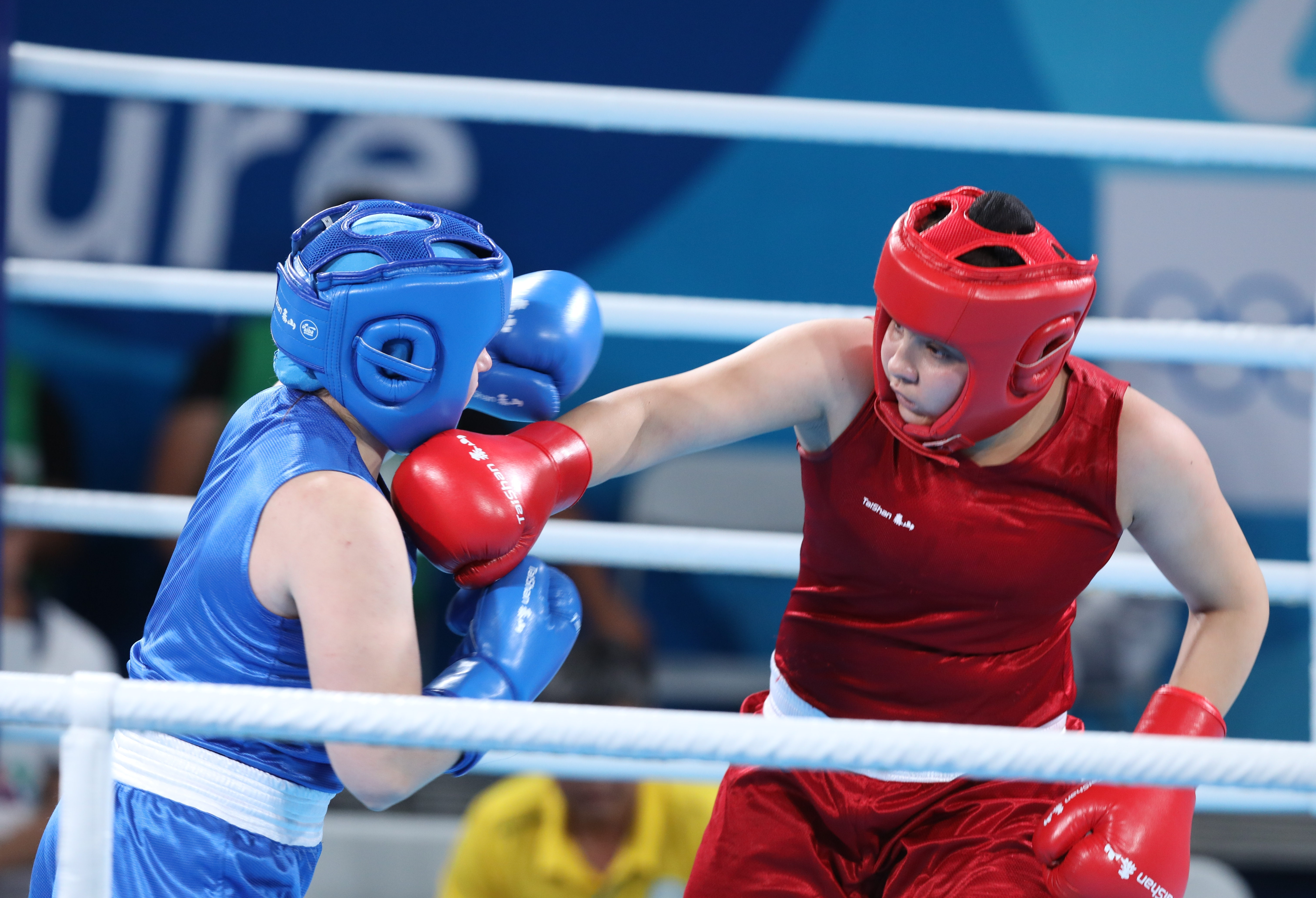
Bronze medal match: Ichrak Chaib vs. Nadezhda Ryabets

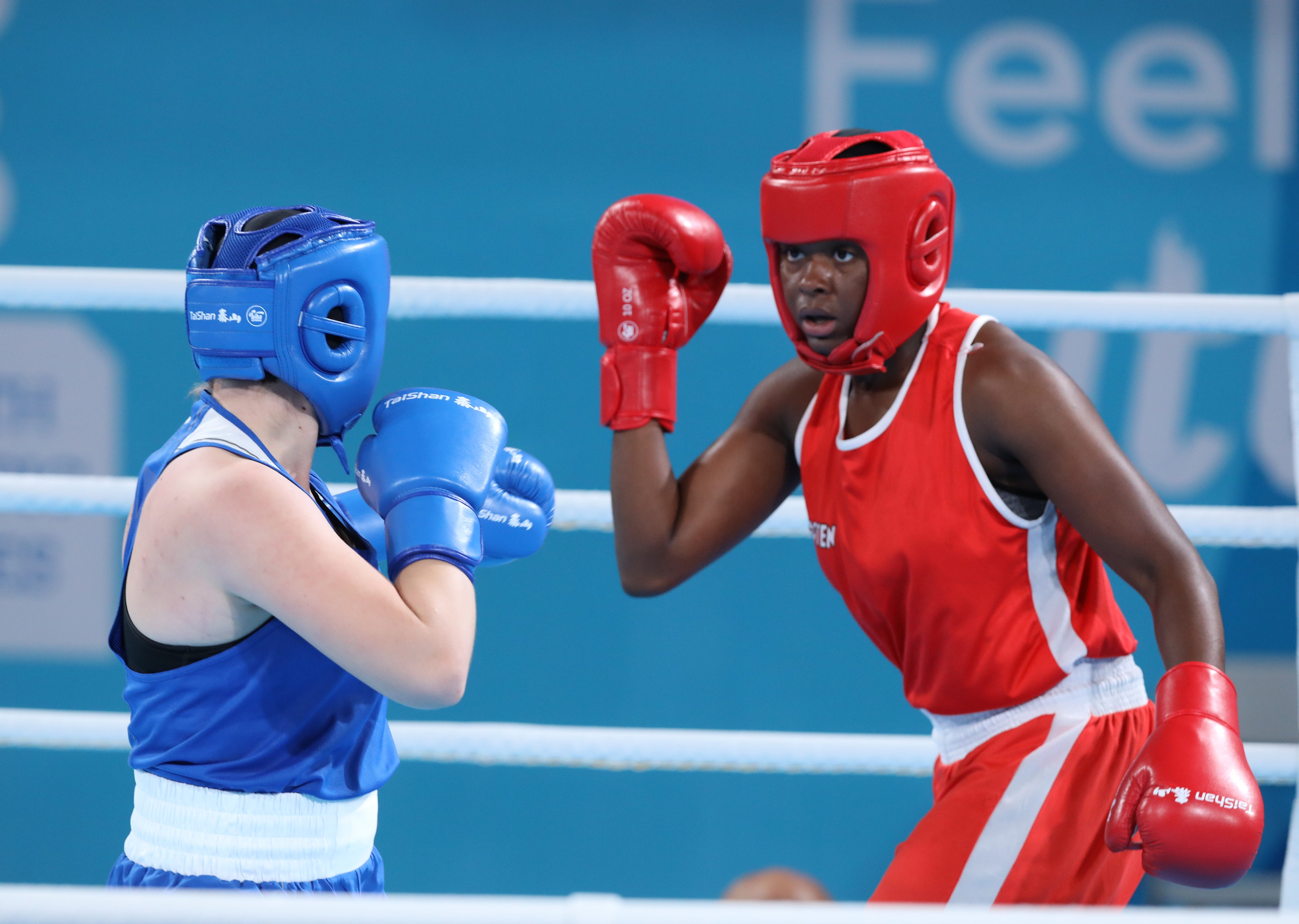
Gold medal match: Tallya Brillaux vs. Anastasiia Shamonova
