= Hayk Babayan =

Armenian commander

Hayk Harutyun Babayan
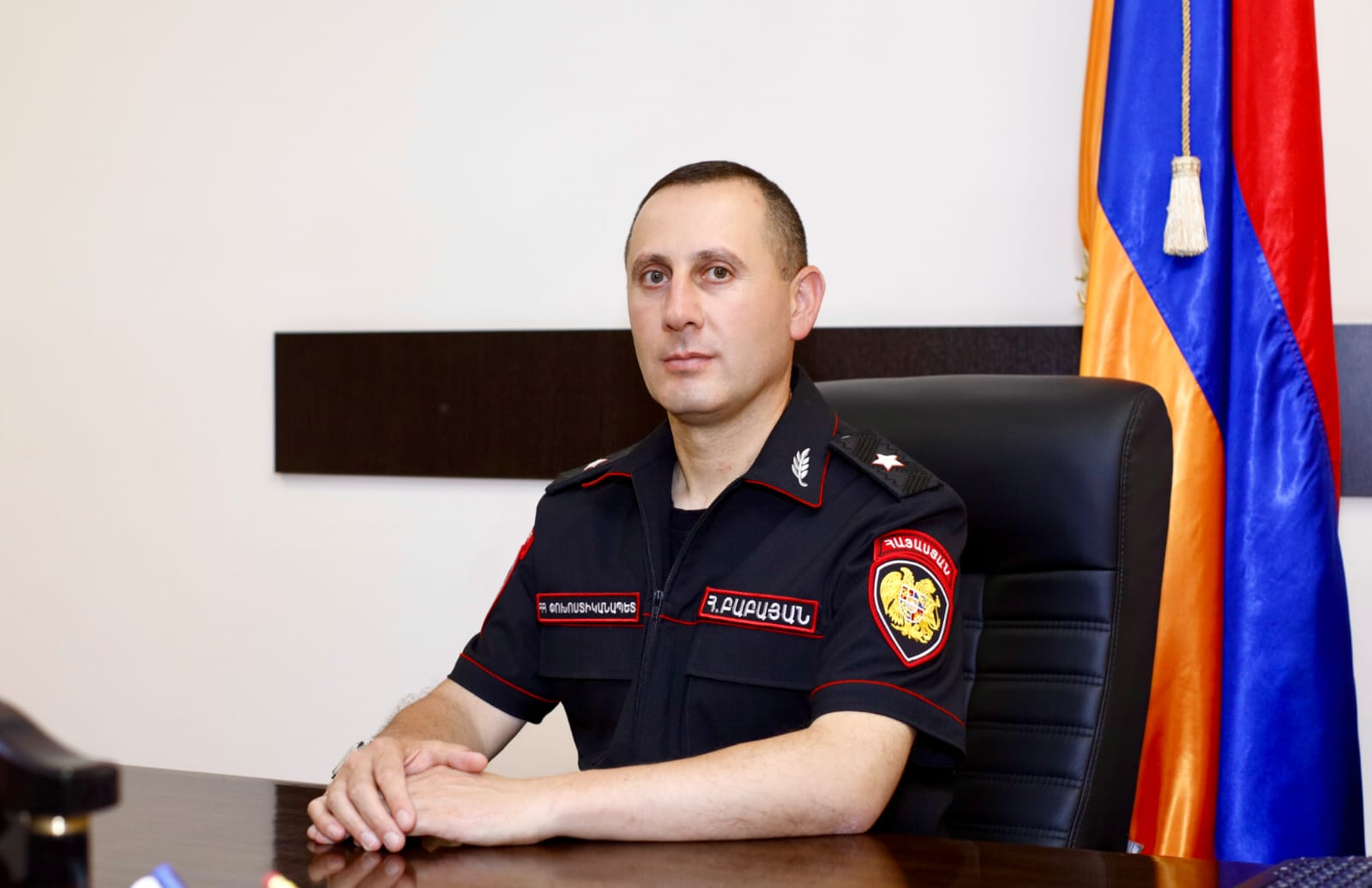
- Born: 25 December, 1979; Garni, Kotayk Province
- Citizenship: Armenia
- Education: RA Police Educational Complex
- Occupations: military, policeman
- Awards: RA State Award "Combat service" Medal, RA Armed Forces Medal "For Meritorious Service" 1st Degree, RA Armed Forces Medal "For Meritorious Service" 2nd Degree, "20th anniversary of the Armenian Armed Forces"; Departmental Medal, RA Armed Forces Medal "For Military Cooperation", RA Police Medal "Stronghold of the Law", "Police 100th Anniversary" Jubilee Medal, Badge "For Distinguished Service in the Police Force" 2nd Degree, Badge "For Distinguished Service in the Police Force" 1st Degree, Order of the Republic of Artsakh "Combat Cross" 2nd Degree (2021), "Combat Support" Medal (April, 2021), "Vazgen Sargsyan" Medal (April, 2021), " Border Guards 30th Anniversary" Medal (May, 2022), "Police Forces 30th Anniversary" Jubilee Medal (June 2022), "30 years of State Security Service" Jubilee Medal (June 2022), "Marshal Baghramyan" Medal (June 2022)

Hayk Harutyun Babayan (Armenian: Հայկ Հարությունի Բաբայան, born on 25 December, 1979) is the Commander of the RA Police Troops, Deputy chief of Police of the MIA of the RA, member of the Collegium of the Police of the MIA of the RA, Major General.

== Biography ==
Hayk Babayan was born on 25 December 1979 in the village of Garni, Kotayk region, in a family of teachers. From 1986 to 1996 he studied at secondary school no. 2 in the village of Garni. From 1996 to 2000, he continued his studies at the Armenian State Institute of Physical Culture and Sport, where he was trained as a coach-educator.

=== Career and education ===
In 2000, he was drafted into the Armenian Armed Forces and was assigned to the military unit named after Marshal Baghramyan. In the same year, he completed a three-month course at the Officers'; Qualification Centre and received the military rank of Lieutenant. From 2000 to 2010 he served in the military unit named after Marshal Baghramyan, holding various positions.

From 2010 to 2012, he served in the 3rd Army Corps of the Armed Forces of Armenia. Then, from 2013 to 2015, he studied and graduated from the Master's program at the RA Police Educational Complex, specializing in jurisprudence.

From 2012 to 2020, he served as the deputy in charge of the affairs of the Commander of the Police Troops of Armenia. During his time in this position, he frequently organised and supervised educational, cultural, philanthropic, and charitable events.

Emphasizing the spiritual education of police officers, Hayk Babayan frequently organized meetings, conversations and discussions with the Spiritual Leader of the RA Police, Ter Vrtanes Baghumyan, in the units of the RA Police Troops, contributing to the strengthening of the moral and psychological education of officers and the formation and development of spiritual and moral values.

He also organized educational meetings, promoted the development of knowledge, skills and abilities of police officers and their preparation for combat duty.

On 16 November 2020, by the decree of the President of Armenia, he was appointed Commander of the Armenian Police Troops and Deputy Chief of Police.

At the initiative of Hayk Babayan, on November 12, 2021, an “Eternity Park” was opened on the territory adjacent to the administrative building of the Main Police Department. The park is dedicated to the police soldiers who died in the 44-day war in Artsakh.

In 2017, the booklets “25 Years of the Police Troops” and “30 Years of the Police Troops” (published in 2022) were released. These booklets reflect the activities of the internal troops of the Ministry of Internal Affairs from 1992 to 2004 and the activities of the RA Police Troops from 2004 to 2022. On his initiative, the anniversary medal “30 Years of Police Forces” was also created.

== Personal life ==
Hayk Babayan is married. He has a son and a daughter.

== Titles ==
- 2000 – soldier
- 2000 – senior
- 2000 – lieutenant
- 2003 – senior lieutenant
- 2005 – captain
- 2008 – major
- 2011 – lieutenant colonel
- 2013 – colonel
- 2024 – Major General

== Awards ==
- RA State Award "Combat service" Medal
- RA Armed Forces Medal "For Meritorious Service" 1st Degree
- RA Armed Forces Medal "For Meritorious Service" 2nd Degree
- "20th anniversary of the Armenian Armed Forces"; Departmental Medal
- RA Armed Forces Medal "For Military Cooperation"
- RA Police Medal "Stronghold of the Law"
- "Police 100th Anniversary" Jubilee Medal
- Badge "For Distinguished Service in the Police Force" 2nd Degree
- Badge "For Distinguished Service in the Police Force" 1st Degree
- Order of the Republic of Artsakh "Combat Cross" 2nd Degree (2021)
- "Combat Support" Medal (April, 2021)
- "Vazgen Sargsyan" Medal (April, 2021)
- " Border Guards 30th Anniversary" Medal (May, 2022)
- "Police Forces 30th Anniversary" Jubilee Medal (June 2022)
- "30 years of State Security Service" Jubilee Medal (June 2022)
- "Marshal Baghramyan" Medal (June 2022)

== Published works ==
- Psychology of a juvenile delinquent / T.A.Azatyan, H.H.Babayan: - Yerevan. Author's edition, 148 pages.

== Gallery ==
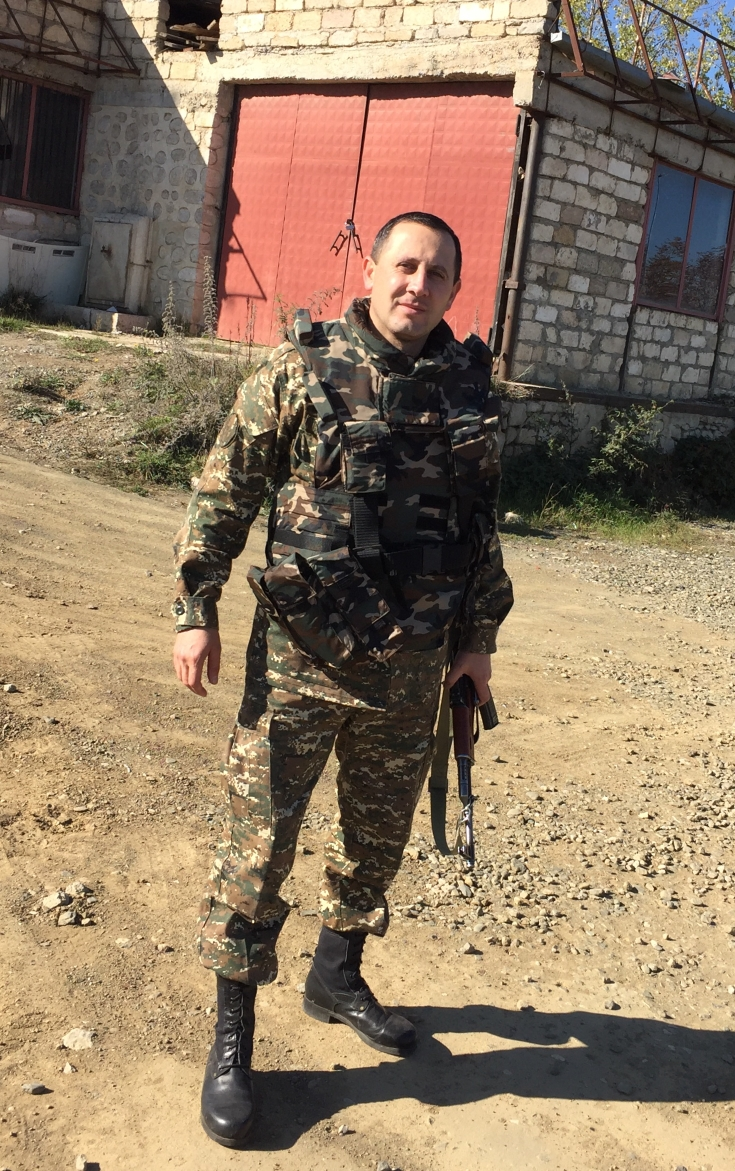
