= Heaven Garcia =

American boxer (born 2000)

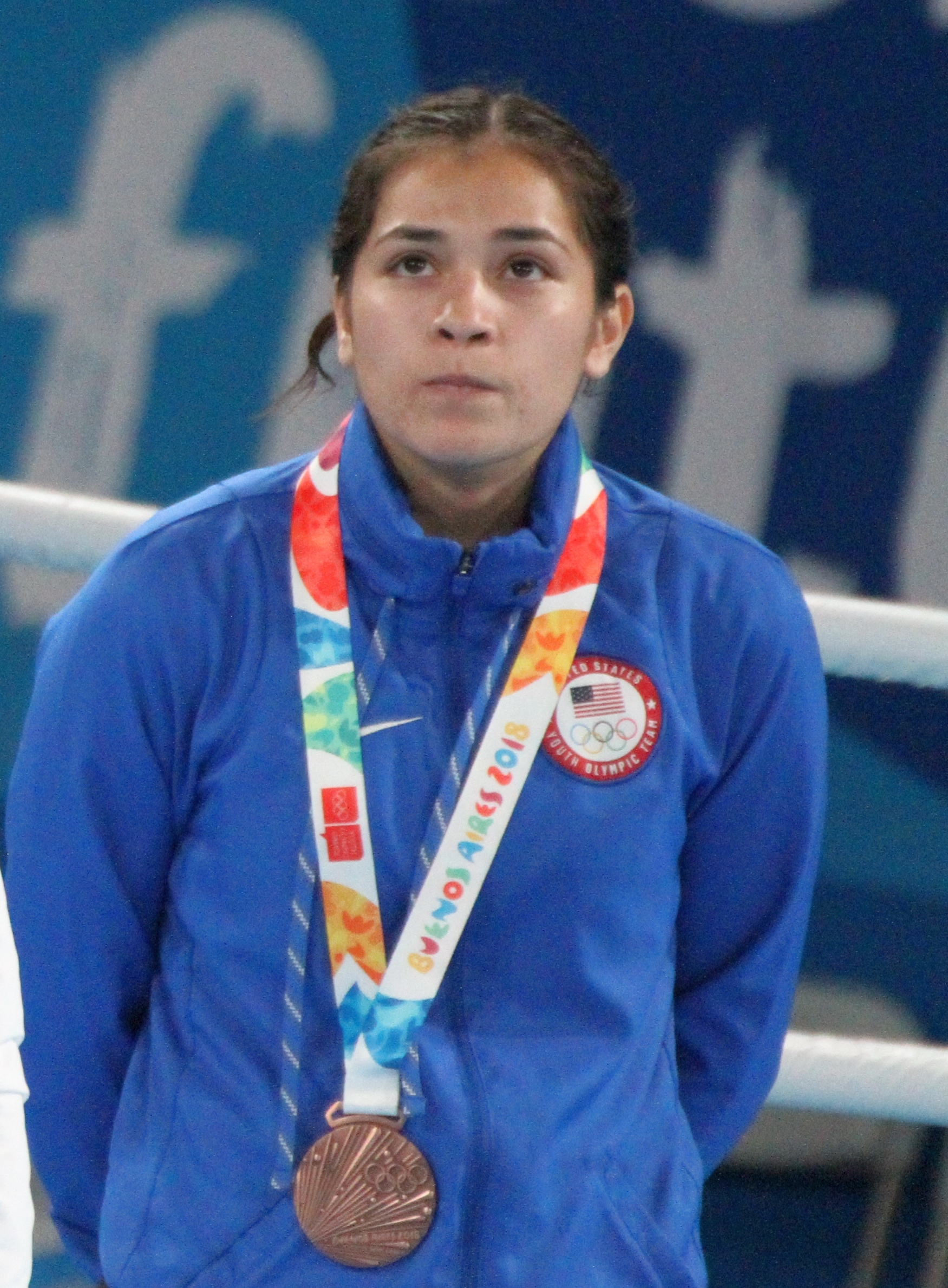
- Garcia in 2018

Personal information
- Nationality: United States
- Born: June 8, 2000 (age 26) Los Angeles, California

Boxing career
Medal record
Boxing
Representing United States
Youth World Championships
Gold medal – first place	2018 Budapest	Women's flyweight
Youth Olympic Games
Bronze medal – third place	2018 Buenos Aires	Girls' flyweight

Heaven Garcia (born June 8, 2000) is an American boxer. She competed at the 2018 AIBA Youth World Boxing Championships, winning the gold medal in the women's flyweight event. She also competed at the 2018 Summer Youth Olympics, winning the bronze medal in the girls' flyweight event.
