= Adijat Gbadamosi =

Nigerian professional boxer

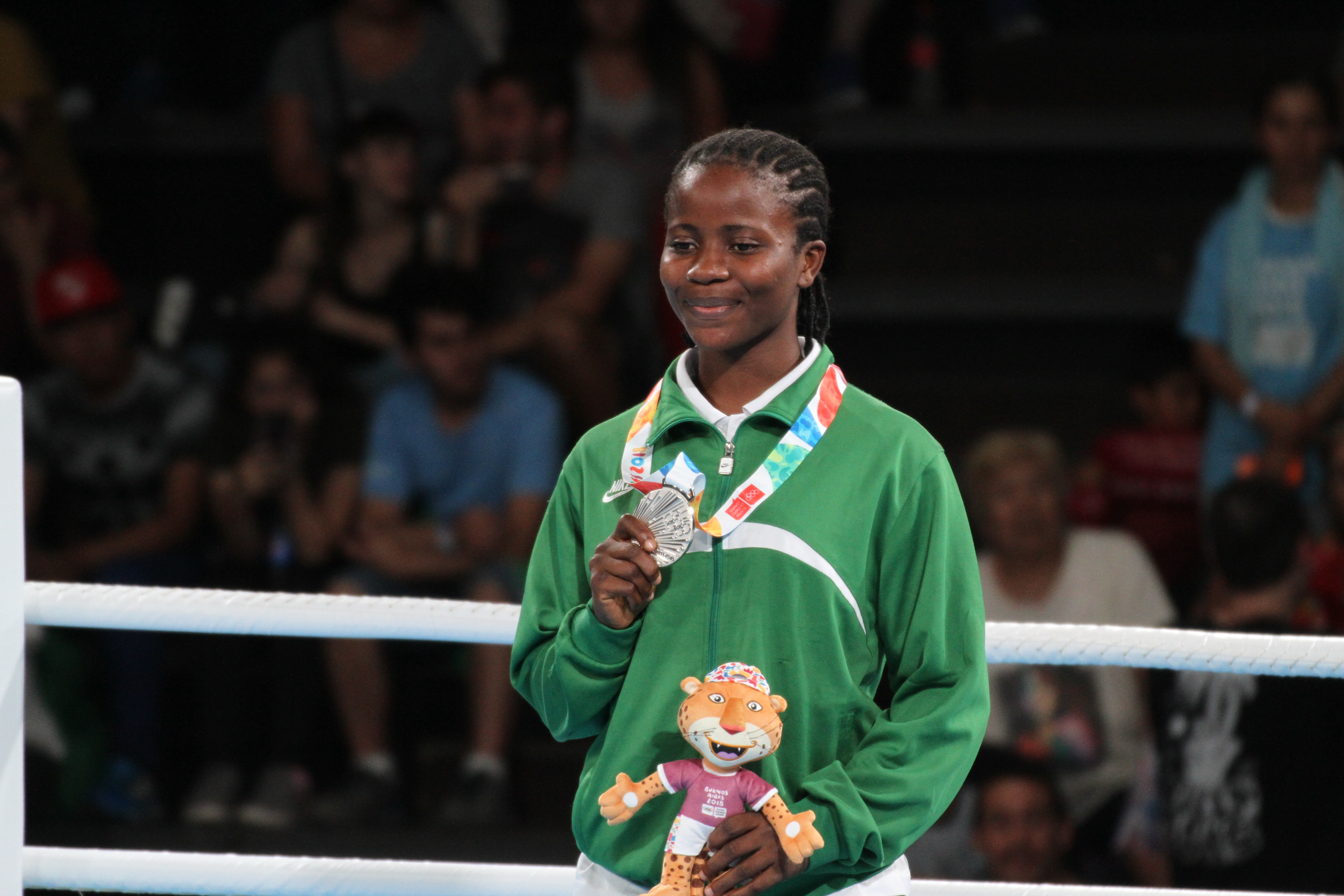

Personal information
- Nationality: Nigerian
- Born: December 31, 2001 (age 24)

Boxing career

Boxing record
- Win by KO: 1
Medal record
African Super Bantamweight 2023, Olympic Silver medalist 2018

Adijat Gbadamosi is a bantamweight/super bantamweight boxer and silver medalist at the 2018 Buenos Aires Youth Olympic. She is the first Nigerian female boxer to win an African boxing title after a TKO victory over Zimbabwean Patience Mastara during the 2023 Africa Super Bantamweight female title fight.

== Early life ==
Adijat Gbadamosi was born on the 31st December 2001, in Nigeria.

== Career ==
Adijat Gbadamosi started out as an amateur boxer, representing Nigeria at the 2018 Buenos Aires Youth Olympic in Argentina, where she won the silver medal after losing the gold medal match to Italy's Martina La Piana.

In the same year, she won a gold medal at the African Youth Boxing Championships in Morocco. In 2019, Gbadamosi won Best Boxer of the Day at theard, 101st edition of the Monthly Saturday Boxing Show held at the Mobolaji Johnson Sports Hall, Lagos.

In 2022, Gbadamosi debuted as a professional boxer at the King of the Ring boxing tourney against Taiye Kodjo.

== Awards ==
- African Super Bantamweight 2023
- Youth Olympic Silver medal, 2018
- African Youth Boxing Gold medal, 2018
