= Alliana Volkart =

Argentine sport shooter (born 2000)

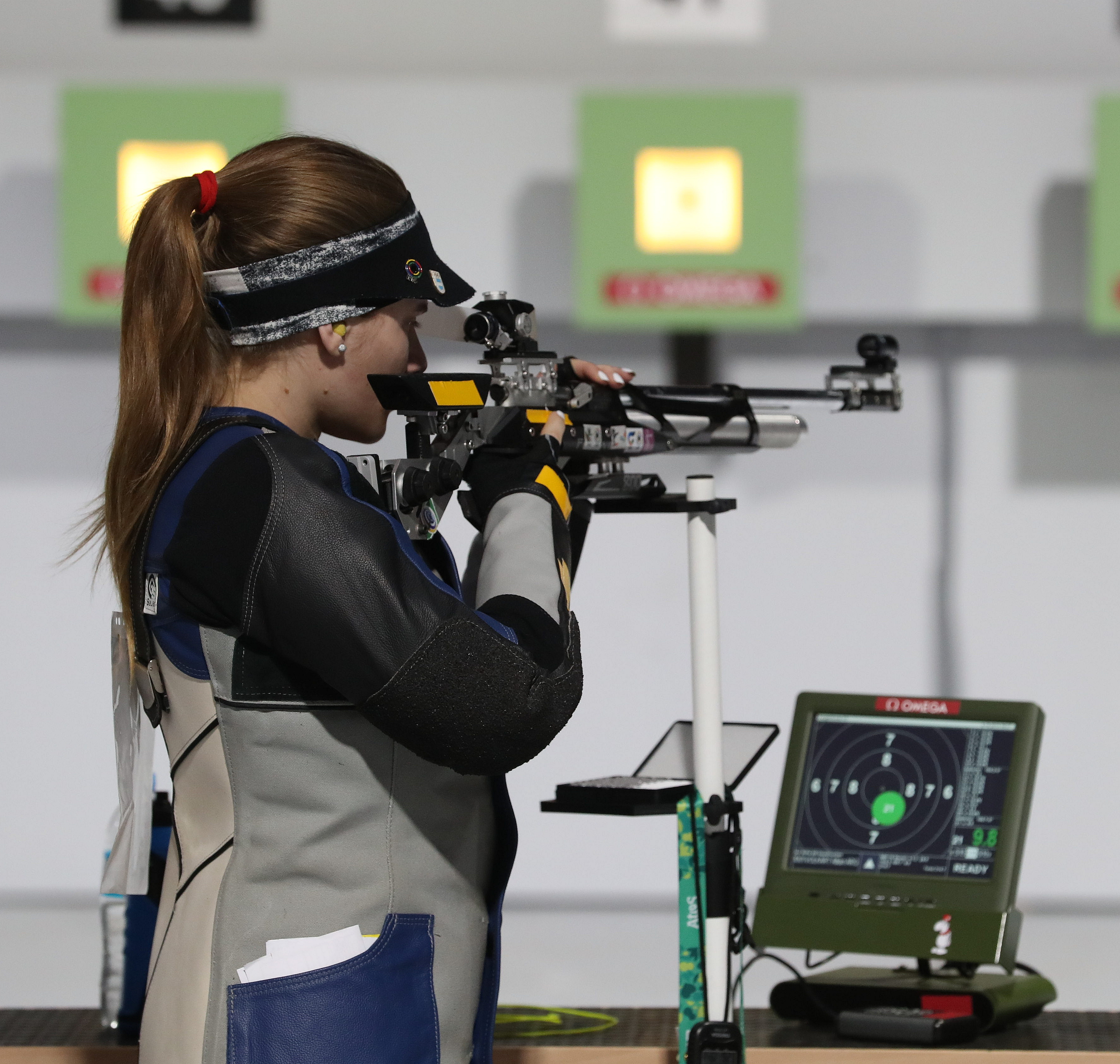
- Alliana Volkart in 2018

Personal information
- Full name: Alliana Volkart
- Nationality: Argentina
- Born: 18 November 2000 (age 25) San Carlos Centro, Santa Fé, Argentina
- Height: 1.62 m (5 ft 4 in)
- Weight: 60 kg (132 lb)

Sport
- Sport: Shooting
- Event: 10 m air rifle (AR60)
Medal record
Women's shooting
Representing Argentina
South American Games
Silver medal – second place	2018 Cochabamba	AR60

Alliana Volkart (born 18 September 2000 in San Carlos Centro, Argentina) is an Argentine sport shooter.

She won a silver medal in the women air rifle event at the 2018 South American Games, after a hard double shootoff in the finals, she obtained the 2nd place with 252.4 points, under only one tenth from the first place.

She has finished first in the 10m Air Rifle Women Youth category at the 2018 ISSF World Cup, held in Fort Benning, United States.

On 26 May 2016, Volkart and the YOG Argentine Youth team took part in the 26th Meeting of the Shooting Hopes.

Volkart made her Olympic debut at the 2018 Summer Youth Olympic Games participating in the Girls' 10 m air rifle event where she ended 13th in the qualification round and thus did not get a place in the finals. She also participated in the Mixed-NOC team event getting to the quarterfinals and ending at the 9th place.
