= Martina La Piana =

Italian boxer (born 2001)

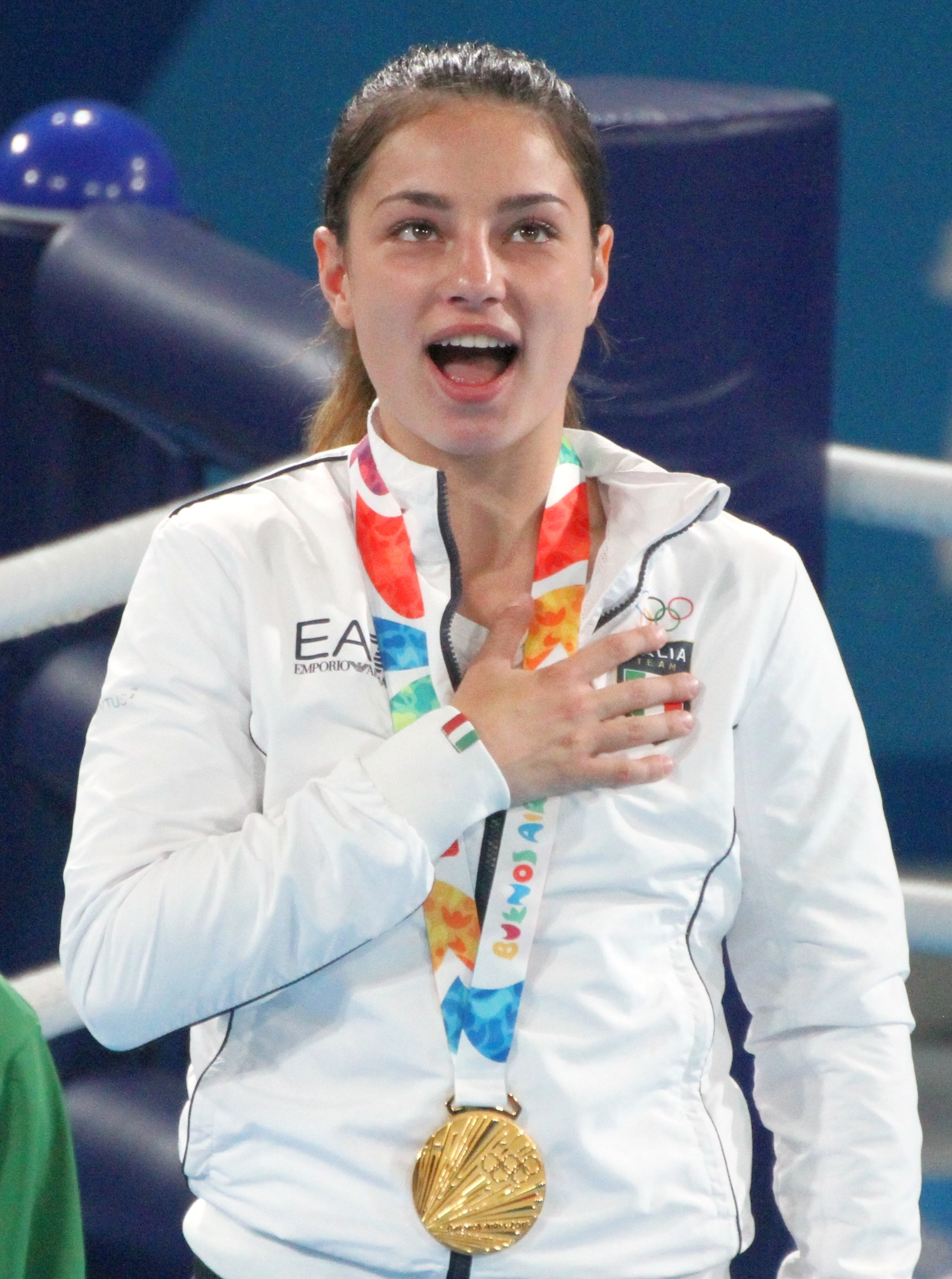
- La Piana in 2018

Personal information
- Nationality: Italy
- Born: 26 November 2001 (age 24) Catania, Sicily, Italy

Boxing career
Medal record
Boxing
Representing Italy
Youth Olympic Games
Gold medal – first place	2018 Buenos Aires	Girls' flyweight

Martina La Piana (born 26 November 2001) is an Italian Olympic boxer. She competed in the 2018 Summer Youth Olympics, winning the gold medal in the girls' flyweight event.
