= Japan at the 2018 Summer Youth Olympics =

- IOC code: JPN
- NOC: Japanese Olympic Committee
- Website: http://www.joc.or.jp/

in Buenos Aires, Argentina 6 – 18 October 2018
- Competitors: 96 in 23 sports
- Flag bearer: Yuka Kagami
- Medals Ranked 3rd: Gold 15 Silver 12 Bronze 12 Total 39

Summer Youth Olympics appearances (overview)
- 2010; 2014; 2018; 2026

Japan participated at the 2018 Summer Youth Olympics in Buenos Aires, Argentina from 6 October to 18 October 2018. Japan competes in 23 events and brought home 39 medals. It was the rehearsal of the hosting Summer Olympics as Tokyo was the host of the 2020 games which was held from 23 July to 8 August 2021.

== Medalists ==
Medal	Name	Sport	Event	Date
Gold	Yuka Ueno	Fencing	Girls' foil	7 October
Gold	Ramu Kawai	Dancesport	B-Girls'	8 October
Gold	Keita Dohi	Sport climbing	Boys' combined	10 October
Gold	Yu Hanaguruma	Swimming	Boys' 200 m breaststroke	10 October
Gold	Takeru Kitazono	Gymnastics	Boys' individual all-around	11 October
Gold	Wataru Sasaki	Wrestling	Boys' Greco-Roman 51 kg	12 October
Gold	Shiori Asaba	Swimming	Girls' 200 m breaststroke	12 October
Gold	Takeru Kitazono	Gymnastics	Boys' floor	13 October
Gold	Nonoka Ozaki	Wrestling	Girls' freestyle 57 kg	13 October
Gold	Yuki Naito; Naoki Tajima	Tennis	Mixed doubles	14 October
Gold	Takeru Kitazono	Gymnastics	Boys' rings	14 October
Gold	Takeru Kitazono	Gymnastics	Boys' parallel bars	15 October
Gold	Takeru Kitazono	Gymnastics	Boys' horizontal bar	15 October
Gold	Haruto Deguchi	Athletics	Boys' 400 m hurdles	16 October
Gold	Kokoro Sakaji	Karate	Girls' 59 kg	17 October
Silver	Shuta Tanaka	Sport climbing	Boys' combined	10 October
Silver	Miu Hirano	Table tennis	Girls' singles	10 October
Silver	Tomokazu Harimoto	Table tennis	Boys' singles	10 October
Silver	Keisuke Yoshida	Swimming	Boys' 800 m freestyle	11 October
Silver	Mayuka Yamamoto	Swimming	Girls' 50 m freestyle	12 October
Silver	Yuki Naito; Naho Sato	Tennis	Girls' doubles	13 October
Silver	Miu Hirano; Tomokazu Harimoto	Table tennis	Mixed team	15 October
Silver	Kazuki Furusawa	Athletics	Boys' pole vault	16 October
Silver	Masaki Yamaoka	Karate	Boys' 61 kg	17 October
Silver	Rinka Tahata	Karate	Girls' 53 kg	17 October
Silver	Mai Miyamoto; Sara Oino; Yuria Sutoh; Rinka Yokoyama; Ichika Arai; Aki Ikeuchi; Miu Maeda; Mitsuki Kobayashi; Rikako Yamakawa; Mirano Abe	Futsal	Girls' tournament	17 October
Silver	Sakura Sawashima	Karate	Girls' 59 kg	18 October
Bronze	Keisuke Yoshida	Swimming	Boys' 400 m freestyle	7 October
Bronze	Shigeyuki Nakarai	Dancesport	B-Boys'	8 October
Bronze	Taku Taniguchi	Swimming	Boys' 100 m breaststroke	8 October
Bronze	Kanami Tanno; Yuma Oshimo	Cycling	Mixed BMX freestyle park	11 October
Bronze	Miku Kojima; Mayuka Yamamoto; Nagisa Ikemoto; Shiori Asaba	Swimming	Girls' 4 × 100 m medley relay	11 October
Bronze	Kodai Naraoka	Badminton	Boys' singles	12 October
Bronze	Shu Yamada	Wrestling	Boys' Greco-Roman 71 kg	12 October
Bronze	Miku Kojima; Taku TaniguchI; Shinnosuke Ishikawa; Nagisa Ikemoto	Swimming	Mixed 4 × 100 m medley relay	12 October
Bronze	Yuka Kagami	Wrestling	Girls' freestyle 73 kg	13 October
Bronze	Koki Wada	Athletics	Boys' long jump	15 October
Bronze	Seiryo Ikeda	Athletics	Boys' 100 m	15 October
Bronze	Ryo Eto; Joh Ohba; Ryosuke Kan; Kaito Nakanishi; Kentaro Fujii; Junya Matsumoto; Kippei Ishida; Haruhiko Uemura; Taisei Konishi; Taira Main; Kanji Futamura; Hibiki Yamada	Rugby sevens	Boys' tournament	15 October

Medals by sport
Sport	1st place, gold medalist(s)	2nd place, silver medalist(s)	3rd place, bronze medalist(s)	Total
Gymnastics	5	0	0	5
Swimming	2	2	4	8
Wrestling	2	0	2	4
Karate	1	3	0	4
Athletics	1	1	2	4
Sport climbing	1	1	0	2
Tennis	1	1	0	2
Dancesport	1	0	1	2
Fencing	1	0	0	1
Table tennis	0	3	0	3
Futsal	0	1	0	1
Badminton	0	0	1	1
Cycling	0	0	1	1
Rugby sevens	0	0	1	1
Total	15	12	12	39

== Competitors ==
Sport	Boy	Girl	Total
Archery	1	1	2
Athletics	8	6	14
Badminton	1	1	2
Cycling	2	2	4
Dancesport	1	1	2
Fencing	2	1	3
Futsal	–	10	10
Golf	1	1	2
Gymnastics	2	3	5
Karate	3	3	6
Modern pentathlon	0	1	1
Rowing	1	0	1
Rugby sevens	12	–	12
Sailing	1	0	1
Shooting	0	1	1
Sport climbing	2	1	3
Swimming	4	4	8
Table tennis	1	1	2
Taekwondo	1	0	1
Tennis	1	2	3
Triathlon	1	1	2
Weightlifting	0	1	1
Wrestling	3	2	5
Total	48	43	91

== Archery ==
Japan qualified two archers based on its performance at the 2017 World Archery Youth Championships.

Individual

Athlete	Event	Ranking round		Round of 32	Round of 16	Quarterfinals	Semifinals	Final / BM	Rank
Athlete	Event	Score	Seed	Opposition Score	Opposition Score	Opposition Score	Opposition Score	Opposition Score	Rank
Tetsuya Aoshima	Boys' Individual	654	22	Tolba (EGY); L 5–6	did not advance				17
Ruka Uehara	Girls' Individual	667	2	Jones (NZL); L 5–6	did not advance				17

Team

Athletes	Event	Ranking round		Round of 32	Round of 16	Quarterfinals	Semifinals	Final / BM	Rank
Athletes	Event	Score	Seed	Opposition Score	Opposition Score	Opposition Score	Opposition Score	Opposition Score	Rank
Tetsuya Aoshima (JPN); Èlia Canales (ESP)	Mixed team	1299	19	Naumova (UKR); Eyeni (CIV); L 4–5	did not advance				17
Ruka Uehara (JPN); Louis Gino Aurelien Juhel (MRI)	Mixed team	1273	30	Kharitonova (RUS); Rezowan (BAN); L 4–5	did not advance				17

== Athletics ==
Boys
Track & road events

Athlete	Event	Stage 1		Stage 2		Total	
Athlete	Event	Time	Rank	Time	Rank	Time	Rank
Seiryo Ikeda	100 m	10.82	3	10.30	3	21.12	3rd place, bronze medalist(s)
Kosuke Ishida	1500 m	3:57.25	11	11:52^{[a]}	5	16	7
Rintaro Kajiyama	3000 m	8:22.15	5	12:10^{[a]}	8	13	6
Haruto Deguchi	400 m hurdles	51.40	1	51.28	1	1:42.68	1st place, gold medalist(s)
Yusuke Iwakawa	5000 m walk	21:49.40	10	23:20.84	12	45:10.24	12

Field Events

Athlete	Event	Stage 1		Stage 2		Total	
Athlete	Event	Time	Rank	Time	Rank	Time	Rank
Kazuki Furusawa	Pole vault	5.10	3	5.22	2	10.32	2nd place, silver medalist(s)
Koki Wada	Long jump	7.46	4	7.66	3	15.12	3rd place, bronze medalist(s)
Kentaro Nakamura	Javelin throw	66.31	13	64.55	12	130.86	12

Girls
Track & road events

Athlete	Event	Stage 1		Stage 2		Total	
Athlete	Event	Time	Rank	Time	Rank	Time	Rank
Takako Niisaka	100 m	12.22	7	11.65	8	23.87	8
Maki Ueda	800 m	2:09.91	8	2:10.06	5	4:19.97	7
Yuki Kanemitsu	1500 m	4:24.41	4	13:13^{[a]}	3	7	4
Miyaka Sugata	3000 m	9:21.16	5	13:59^{[a]}	11	16	9

Field Events

Athlete	Event	Stage 1		Stage 2		Total	
Athlete	Event	Time	Rank	Time	Rank	Time	Rank
Azuki Nakatsugawa	Long jump	5.86	6	6.14	5	12.00	5
Yuika Nakamura	Javelin throw	43.62	14	DNS	-	-	-

^{a} Cross Country

== Badminton ==
Japan qualified two players based on the Badminton Junior World Rankings.

Singles

Athlete	Event	Group Stage				Quarterfinal	Semifinal	Final / BM	
Athlete	Event	Opposition Score	Opposition Score	Opposition Score	Rank	Opposition Score	Opposition Score	Opposition Score	Rank
Kodai Naraoka	Boys' singles	Chang Ho Kim (FIJ); W (21–7, 21–5)	Cristian Savin (MDA); W (21–8, 21–13)	Dmitriy Panarin (KAZ); W (21–9, 21–12)	1 Q	Chen Shiau-cheng (TPE); W (21–11, 21–11)	Lakshya Sen (IND); L (21–14, 15–21, 22–24)	Arnaud Merklé (FRA); W (21–17, 24–26, 22–20)	3rd place, bronze medalist(s)
Hirari Mizui	Girls' singles	Léonice Huet (FRA); W (21–14, 21–16)	Halla Bouksani (ALG); W (21–1, 21–9)	Wang Zhiyi (CHN); L (10–21, 21–17, 16–21)	2	did not advance			9

Team

Athlete	Event	Group stage				Quarterfinal	Semifinal	Final / BM	Rank
Athlete	Event	Opposition Score	Opposition Score	Opposition Score	Rank	Opposition Score	Opposition Score	Opposition Score	Rank
Team Theta; Kodai Naraoka (JPN); Hirari Mizui (JPN); Julien Carraggi (BEL); Mohamed Mostafa Kamel (EGY); Lukas Resch (GER); Zecily Fung (AUS); Jaqueline Lima (BRA); Tereza Švábíková (CZE)	Mixed Teams	Sigma (MIX); L (100–110)	Omega (MIX); L (100–110)	Gamma (MIX); L (107–110)	4Q	Delta (MIX); W (110–93)	Alpha (MIX); L (90–110)	Zeta (MIX); W (110–107)	3rd place, bronze medalist(s)

== Cycling ==
Japan qualified a boys' and girls' combined team based on its ranking in the Youth Olympic Games Junior Nation Rankings, but they didn't participate. They also qualified a mixed BMX racing team based on its ranking in the Youth Olympic Games BMX Junior Nation Rankings and two athletes in BMX freestyle based on its performance at the 2018 Urban Cycling World Championship.

Athlete	Event	Points	Total	Rank
Yuichi Masuda	Mixed BMX racing	10	40	9
Miru Nagare	Mixed BMX racing	30	40	9
Yuma Oshimo	Mixed BMX freestyle park	6	14	3rd place, bronze medalist(s)
Miru Nagare	Mixed BMX freestyle park	8	14	3rd place, bronze medalist(s)

== Dancesport ==
Japan qualified two dancers based on its performance at the 2018 World Youth Breaking Championship.

Athlete	Nickname	Events	Group Stage				Quarterfinal	Semifinal	Final / BM	
Athlete	Nickname	Events	Opposition Result	Opposition Result	Opposition Result	Rank	Opposition Result	Opposition Result	Opposition Result	Rank
Shigeyuki Nakarai	Shigekix	B-Boys	Reflow (BEL); W (2–0)	D-Matt (CAN); W (2–0)	Jordan (RSA); W (2–0)	1 Q	X-Rain (CHN); W (4–0)	Bumblebee (RUS); L (1–3)	Axel (POL); W (4–0)	3rd place, bronze medalist(s)
Ramu Kawai	Ram	B-Girls	Vicky (NED); W (2–0)	Emma (CAN); W (2–0)	Csepke (HUN); W (2–0)	1 Q	Vicky (NED); W (4–0)	Yell (KOR); W (4–0)	Emma (CAN); W (4–0)	1st place, gold medalist(s)

== Fencing ==
Japan qualified three athletes based on its performance at the 2018 Cadet World Championship.

Athlete	Event	Group Stage							Round of 16	Quarterfinals	Semifinals	Final / BM / FM	
Athlete	Event	Opposition Score	Opposition Score	Opposition Score	Opposition Score	Opposition Score	Opposition Score	Rank	Opposition Score	Opposition Score	Opposition Score	Opposition Score	Rank
Seiya Asami	Boys' épée	Ignacio Pérez Contreras (ARG); W (5–1)	Khasan Baudunov (KGZ); L (3–4)	Paul Veltrup (GER); L (2–5)	Seraphim Hsieh Jarov (CAN); W (5–3)	Artur Tolasov (RUS); W (5–1)	—N/a	2	—N/a	Khasan Baudunov (KGZ); L (1–5)	Did not advance		6
Hibiki Kato	Boys' sabre	Samuel Jarry (FRA); L (1–5)	Andrei Păștin (ROU); W (5–1)	Matias Ríos (ARG); W (5–1)	Hudson Santana (PUR); L (4–5)	Alonso Santamaría (ESP); L (3–5)	—N/a	4	Amirhossein Shaker (IRI); W (15–9)	Hyun Jun (KOR); L (12–15)	Did not advance		8
Yuka Ueno	Girls' foil	Giorgia Salmas (AUS); W (5–0)	Venissia Thépaut (FRA); W (5–3)	Rebeca Cândescu (ROU); W (5–1)	Christelle Joy Ko (HKG); W (5–1)	Anabella Acurero (VEN); W (5–0)	Noha Hany (EGY); W (5–1)	1	—N/a	Christelle Joy Ko (HKG); W (13–3)	Anabella Acurero (VEN); W (8–4)	Martina Favaretto (ITA); W (15–12)	1st place, gold medalist(s)

== Futsal ==
Girls
Summary

Team	Event	Group Stage					Semifinal	Final / BM	
Team	Event	Opposition score	Opposition score	Opposition score	Opposition score	Rank	Opposition score	Opposition score	Rank
Japan	Girls' tournament	Cameroon; W 6–2	Chile; W 4–1	Dominican Republic; W 6–2	Portugal; L 0–2	2	Spain; W 3–2	Portugal; L 1–4	2nd place, silver medalist(s)

Group D

Pos	Team	Pld	W	D	L	GF	GA	GD	Pts	Qualification
1	Portugal	4	4	0	0	37	2	+35	12	Semi-finals
2	Japan	4	3	0	1	16	7	+9	9	Semi-finals
3	Cameroon	4	2	0	2	16	13	+3	6	
4	Chile	4	0	1	3	6	27	−21	1	
5	Dominican Republic	4	0	1	3	6	32	−26	1	

Source: FIFA IOC
8 October 2018
14:00

Cameroon	2–6	Japan
Tchomte 29'; Kalieu 35'	Report (FIFA); Report (IOC)	Maeda 7', 36'; Yamakawa 8', 20'; Miyamoto 34'; Oino 38'

Tecnópolis
Attendance: 1,260
Referee: Andres Peña (Argentina)
10 October 2018
14:00

Japan	4–1	Chile
Miyamoto 13'; Maeda 23'; Arai 27'; Carrasco 33' (o.g.)	Report (FIFA); Report (IOC)	Mora 17'

CeNARD
Attendance: 227
Referee: Leandro Lorenzo (Argentina)
11 October 2018
14:00

Japan	6–2	Dominican Republic
Yokoyama 7'; Oino 9'; Ikeuchi 18'; Abe 19'; Arai 22'; Maeda 27'	Report (FIFA); Report (IOC)	Collado 3', 4'

Tecnópolis
Attendance: 2,085
Referee: Tayana Moreno (Venezuela)
13 October 2018
14:00

Portugal	2–0	Japan
Sanheiro 5'; Pereira 21'	Report FIFA); Report (IOC)

CeNARD
Attendance: 359
Referee: Rafael Villalba (Paraguay)

Semi-finals

15 October 2018
16:00

Spain	2–3	Japan
de las Heras 17', 39'	Report (FIFA); Report (IOC)	Maeda 21'; Arai 24'; Oino 32'

Tecnópolis
Attendance: 6,200
Referee: Lance Vanhaitsma (United States)

Finals

17 October 2018
18:00

Portugal	4–1	Japan
Fifó 1', 9', 14', 21'	Report (FIFA); Report (IOC) Category:Futsal at the 2018 Summer Youth Olympics – Girls Final on Wikimedia Commons	Yamakawa 21'

Tecnópolis
Attendance: 1,800
Referee: Gelareh Nazemi (Iran)

== Golf ==
Individual

Athlete	Event	Round 1		Round 2			Round 3			Total		
Athlete	Event	Score	Rank	Score	Total	Rank	Score	Total	Rank	Score	Par	Rank
Kagetsu Tsuruse	Girls' Individual	79 (+9)	22	77 (+7)	156	19	79 (+9)	235	28	235	+25	27
Ryou Hitsatsune	Boys' Individual	75 (+5)	20	68 (-2)	143	1	70 (0)	213	4	213	+3	5

Team

Athletes	Event	Round 1 (Fourball)		Round 2 (Foursome)		Round 3 (Individual Stroke)				Total		
Athletes	Event	Score	Rank	Score	Rank	Girl	Boy	Total	Rank	Score	Par	Rank
Kagetsu Tsuruse; Ryou Hitsatsune	Mixed team	64 (-6)	6	74 (+4)	15	76	70	146 (+6)	11	284	+4	9

== Gymnastics ==
=== Artistic ===
Japan qualified two gymnasts based on its performance at the 2018 Asian Junior Championship.

Athlete	Event	Apparatus						Total	Rank
Athlete	Event	F	PH	R	V	PB	HB	Total	Rank
Takeru Kitazono	Qualification	13.500	14.133	13.700	14.100	14.266	13.600	83.299	1 Q
Takeru Kitazono	All-around	13.833	13.966	13.466	14.233	13.000	13.800	83.299	1st place, gold medalist(s)
Takeru Kitazono	Floor							13.633	1st place, gold medalist(s)
Takeru Kitazono	Parallel bars							12.666	6
Takeru Kitazono	Rings							13.533	1st place, gold medalist(s)
Takeru Kitazono	Parallel bars							14.166	1st place, gold medalist(s)
Takeru Kitazono	Horizontal bar							13.566	1st place, gold medalist(s)

Athlete	Event	Apparatus				Total	Rank
Athlete	Event	V	UB	BB	F	Total	Rank
Chiharu Yamada	Qualification	13.100	9.733	11.166	12.566	46.565	21
Chiharu Yamada	Floor					12.000	6

=== Rhythmic ===
Japan qualified one gymnast based on its performance at the 2018 Asian Junior Championship.

Individual

Athlete	Event	Qualification						Final					
Athlete	Event	Hoop	Ball	Clubs	Ribbon	Total	Rank	Hoop	Ball	Clubs	Ribbon	Total	Rank
Aino Yamada	Individual	14.900	14.850	15.450	14.250	59.450	6 Q	15.500	15.300	15.000	12.400	58.200	8

=== Trampoline ===
Japan qualified two gymnasts based on its performance at the 2018 Asian Junior Championship.

- Boys' trampoline – 1 quota
- Girls' trampoline – 1 quota

Athlete	Event	Qualification				Final	
Athlete	Event	Routine 1	Routine 2	Total	Rank	Score	Rank
Takumi Fujimoto	Boys			50.975	12	Did not advance	
Yuki Okuno	Girls	42.440	50.395	92.835	6 Q	50.760	5

== Karate ==
Japan qualified three athlete based on the rankings in the Buenos Aires 2018 Olympic Standings. Later, they qualified three more athletes based on its performance at one of the Karate Qualification Tournaments.

Athlete	Event	Group Stage				Semifinal	Final / BM	
Athlete	Event	Opposition Score	Opposition Score	Opposition Score	Rank	Opposition Score	Opposition Score	Rank
Masaki Yamaoka	Boys' 61 kg	Pedropablo de la Roca (GUA); W (4–0)	Alireza Farajikouhikheili (IRI); W (5–0)	Oussama Edari (MAR); D (0–0)	1	Fahik Veseli (MKD); W (8–0)	Mohammed Al-Assiri (KSA); L (0–8)	2nd place, silver medalist(s)
Kotaro Nakamura	Boys' 68 kg	Yassine Sekouri (MAR); L (2–8)	Abilmansur Batyrgali (KAZ); L (0–3)	Juan Salsench (ARG); D (0–0)	3	Did not advance		
Keisei Sakiyama	Boys' +68 kg	Tomáš Kósa (SVK); W (1–0)	Navid Mohammadi (IRI); W (2–0)	Sean McCarthy Crean (IRL); L (1–2)	3	Did not advance		
Rinka Tahata	Girls' 53 kg	Aika Okazaki (THA); D (3–3)	Tânia de Barros (POR); W (2–0)	Fatemeh Khonakdartarsi (IRI); W (1–0)	1	Dildora Alikulova (UZB); W (2–0)	Yasmin Nasr Elgewily (EGY); L (1–2)	2nd place, silver medalist(s)
Kokoro Sakaji	Girls' 59 kg	Marta Ossipova (EST); W (4–0)	Zsófia Baranyi (HUN); W (1–0)	Ivana Perović (SRB); W (1–0)	1	Mobina Heydariozomcheloei (IRI); D (0–0)	Anna Chernysheva (RSA); W (3–0)	1st place, gold medalist(s)
Sakura Sawashima	Girls' +59 kg	Laura Lyck (DEN); W (2–0)	Negin Altooni (IRI); L (1–5)	Janessa Fonseca (PUR); W (3–0)	1	Lauren Salisbury (GBR); W (9–1)	Annika Sælid (NOR); L (0–3)	2nd place, silver medalist(s)

== Rowing ==
Japan qualified one boat based on its performance at the 2018 Asian Youth Olympic Games Qualification Regatta.

- Boys' single sculls – 1 athlete

== Rugby sevens ==
=== Boys' tournament ===
Summary

Team	Event	Group Stage						Bronze medal game	
Team	Event	Opposition score	Opposition score	Opposition score	Opposition score	Opposition score	Rank	Opposition score	Rank
Japan	Boys' tournament	South Africa; W 14–12	Argentina; L 0–45	Samoa; W 29–0	United States; D 17–17	France; L 14–29	3	South Africa; W 28–5	3rd place, bronze medalist(s)

Group Stage

Pos	Team	Pld	W	D	L	PF	PA	PD	Pts
1	Argentina	5	5	0	0	180	38	+142	15
2	France	5	4	0	1	111	65	+46	13
3	Japan	5	2	1	2	74	103	−29	10
4	South Africa	5	2	0	3	79	84	−5	9
5	United States	5	0	2	3	67	120	−53	7
6	Samoa	5	0	1	4	48	149	−101	6

Source: Buenos Aires 2018
Rules for classification: 1) Points; 2) Head-to-head result; 3) Point difference; 4) Points scored.

13 October 2018
13:15

South Africa	12–14	Japan
Try: Maubane 3'c Kellerman 7'm Con: Hattingh (1/2) 3'	Report	Try: Nakanishi 6'c Konishi 11'c Con: Yamada (2/2) 7', 12'

Club Atlético San Isidro, Buenos Aires
Referee: Nehuen Jauri Rivero (Argentina)

13 October 2018
17:10

Argentina	45–0	Japan
Try: Cinti Luna (2) 2'c, 9'c Vanni 4'm González 6'c Mendy 8'c Graziano 11'm Moneta 13'c Con: Roger (2/3) 3', 6'; Elicagaray (3/4) 8', 9', 13'	Report

Club Atlético San Isidro, Buenos Aires
Referee: Francisco González (Uruguay)

14 October 2018
10:05

Japan	29–0	Samoa
Try: Fujii (3) 0'm, 1'm, 4'c Konishi 10'c Nakanishi 13'm Con: Yamada (2/5) 5', 10'	Report

Club Atlético San Isidro, Buenos Aires
Referee: Damián Schneider (Argentina)

14 October 2018
12:45

United States	17–17	Japan
Try: Sione 3'c Kruse 10'm Green 13'm Con: Sione (1/3) 3'	Report	Try: Konishi 4'c Nakanashi 6'm Yamada 8'm Con: Konishi (1/1) 5'; Ishida (0/1); Uemura (0/1)

Club Atlético San Isidro, Buenos Aires
Referee: Nehuen Jauri Rivero (Argentina)

15 October 2018
11:55

France	29–14	Japan
Try: Dridi 1'c Dulon 4'm Randle 6'c Trouabal 11'm Tani 13'm Con: Bellot (1/2) 2'; Tiberghien (1/2) 7'; Germain (0/1)	Report	Try: Konishi 3'c Fujii 9'c Con: Konishi (1/1) 4'; Yamada (1/1) 9'

Club Atlético San Isidro, Buenos Aires
Referee: Paulo Duarte (Portugal)

Bronze medal match

15 October 2018
15:10

Japan	28–5	South Africa
Try: Fujii 2'c Nakanishi 3'c Konishi (2) 8'c, 12'c Con: Konishi (4/4) 2', 3', 9', 12'	Report	Try: Maubane 13'm Con: Braude (0/1)

Club Atlético San Isidro, Buenos Aires
Referee: Damián Schneider (Argentina)

== Sailing ==
Japan qualified one boat based on its performance at the 2018 Singapore Open (Asian Techno 293+ Qualifiers).

- Boys' Techno 293+ – 1 boat

== Shooting ==
- Girls Rifle – Aoi Takagi

Individual

Athlete	Event	Qualification		Final	
Athlete	Event	Points	Rank	Points	Rank
Aoi Takagi	Girls' 10m air rifle	615.1	15	did not advance	

Team

Athletes	Event	Qualification		Round of 16	Quarterfinals	Semifinals	Final / BM	
Athletes	Event	Points	Rank	Opposition Result	Opposition Result	Opposition Result	Opposition Result	Rank
Aoi Takagi (JPN); Maximilian Ulbrich (GER)	Mixed 10 metre air rifle	825.1	7 Q	Martínez López (MEX); Wadlegger (AUT); L 7–10	did not advance			

== Sport climbing ==
Japan qualified two sport climbers based on its performance at the 2017 World Youth Sport Climbing Championships. They also qualified a female climber based on its performance at the 2017 Asian Youth Sport Climbing Championships.

- Boys' combined – 2 quotas (Keita Dohi, Shuta Tanaka)
- Girls' combined – 1 quota (Mao Nakamura)

== Swimming ==
Boys

Athlete	Event	Heat		Semifinal		Final	
Athlete	Event	Time	Rank	Time	Rank	Time	Rank
Keisuke Yoshida	200 m freestyle	1:48.97	1 Q	—N/a		1:48.75	5
Keisuke Yoshida	400 m freestyle	3:51.68	1 Q	—N/a		3:48.68	3rd place, bronze medalist(s)
Keisuke Yoshida	800 m freestyle	—N/a				7:53.85	2nd place, silver medalist(s)
Taku Taniguchi	50 m breaststroke	28.28	3 Q	28.22	4	28.20	4
Taku Taniguchi	100 m breaststroke	1:01.68	3 Q	1:02.08	5 Q	1:01.40	3rd place, bronze medalist(s)
Taku Taniguchi	200 m breaststroke	2:16.67	8 Q	—N/a		2:15.21	5
Yu Hanaguruma	50 m breaststroke	29.18	16 Q	29.01	14	Did not advance	
Yu Hanaguruma	100 m breaststroke	1:02.22	4 Q	1:01.99	4 Q	1:01.62	4
Yu Hanaguruma	200 m breaststroke	2:13.58	1 Q	—N/a		2:11.63	1st place, gold medalist(s)
Shinnosuke Ishikawa	50 m butterfly	24.64	16 Q	24.76	14	Did not advance	
Shinnosuke Ishikawa	100 m butterfly	53.57	7 Q	52.67	4 Q	52.52	4
Shinnosuke Ishikawa	200 m butterfly	2:01.47	7 Q	—N/a		1:59.42	6
Keisuke Yoshida; Taku Taniguchi; Shinnosuke Ishikawa; Yu Hanaguruma	4 × 100 m freestyle relay	—N/a				3:26.80	6
Keisuke Yoshida; Yu Hanaguruma; Shinnosuke Ishikawa; Taku Taniguchi	4 × 100 m medley relay	3:45.34	3 Q	—N/a		DSQ	

Girls

Athlete	Event	Heat		Semifinal		Final	
Athlete	Event	Time	Rank	Time	Rank	Time	Rank
Mayuka Yamamoto	50 m freestyle	25.80	6 Q	25.62	7 Q	25.39	2nd place, silver medalist(s)
Mayuka Yamamoto	100 m freestyle	55.95	4 Q	56.37	9	Did not advance	
Mayuka Yamamoto	50 m butterfly	26.84	3 Q	27.12	8 Q	27.17	7
Nagisa Ikemoto	50 m freestyle	26.52	18	Did not advance			
Nagisa Ikemoto	100 m freestyle	55.51	2 Q	55.25	4 Q	55.37	4
Nagisa Ikemoto	200 m freestyle	2:01.18	6 Q	—N/a		1:59.89	5
Shiori Asaba	50 m breaststroke	33.46	25	Did not advance			
Shiori Asaba	100 m breaststroke	1:09.27	3 Q	1:09.50	6 Q	1:09.57	8
Shiori Asaba	200 m breaststroke	2:29.12	1 Q	—N/a		2:26.80	1st place, gold medalist(s)
Miku Kojima	200 m individual medley	2:15.37	3 Q	—N/a		2:15.09	4
Miku Kojima; Mayuka Yamamoto; Nagisa Ikemoto; Shiori Asaba	4 × 100 m freestyle relay	—N/a				3:49.27	3rd place, bronze medalist(s)

Mixed

Athlete	Event	Heat		Final	
Athlete	Event	Time	Rank	Time	Rank
Keisuke Yoshida; Taku Taniguchi; Mayuka Yamamoto; Nagisa Ikemoto; Shinnosuke Ishikawa^{[a]}	4 × 100 m freestyle relay	3:35.95	6 Q	3:34.18	7
Miku Kojima; Taku TaniguchI; Shinnosuke Ishikawa; Nagisa Ikemoto; Yu Hanaguruma^{[b]}	4 × 100 m medley relay	3:54.14	2 Q	3:51.74	3rd place, bronze medalist(s)

- ^{a} Swimmers who participated in the heats only.
- ^{b} Swimmers who participated in the heats only and received medals.

== Table tennis ==
Japan qualified two table tennis players based on its performance at the Asian Continental Qualifier.

- Boys' singles – Tomokazu Harimoto
- Girls' singles – Miu Hirano

== Taekwondo ==
Athlete	Event	Round of 16	Quarterfinals	Semifinals	Final	
Athlete	Event	Opposition Score	Opposition Score	Opposition Score	Opposition Score	Rank
Hidetaka Maeda	Boys' 55 kg	Mason Yarrow (GBR); W (29–6)	Georgii Popov (RUS); L (13–34)	did not advance		

== Tennis ==
Athlete	Event	First round	Second round	Quarterfinals	Semifinals	Final / BM	
Athlete	Event	Opposition Score	Opposition Score	Opposition Score	Opposition Score	Opposition Score	Rank
Naoki Tajima	Boys' singles	Arnaud Bovy (BEL); W (6–4, 6-2)	Hugo Gaston (FRA); L (3–6, 2-6)	did not advance			
Naoki Tajima; Mu Tao (CHN)	Boys' doubles	Filip Cristian Jianu; Daniel Michalski (MIX); W (6–7, 6-3)	—N/a	Sebastián Báez; Facundo Díaz Acosta (ARG); L (0–6, 1-6)	did not advance		
Yuki Naito	Girls' singles	Wang Xiyu (CHN); W (7–6, 7-5)	Kamilla Rakhimova (RUS); W (7–6, 3-6, 6-4)	Camila Osorio (COL); L (7–6, 3-6, 1-6)	did not advance		
Naho Sato	Girls' singles	Viktoriia Dema (UKR); L (1–6, 4-6)	did not advance				
Yuki Naito; Naho Sato	Girls' doubles	Georgia Drummy; Ana Makatsaria (MIX); W (6–1, 7-5)	—N/a	Margaryta Bilokin; Viktoriia Dema (UKR); W (7–5, 5-7)	Wang Xinyu; Wang Xiyu (CHN); W (6–4, 4-6)	Kaja Juvan; Iga Świątek (MIX); L (7–6, 5-7)	2nd place, silver medalist(s)
Yuki Naito; Naoki Tajima	Mixed doubles	Ana Makatsaria; Patrick Sydow (MIX); W (6–0, 6-1)	Iga Świątek; Daniel Michalski (POL); W w/o	Joanna Garland; Tseng Chun-hsin (TPE); W (6–1, 6-0)	Clara Burel; Hugo Gaston (FRA); W (6–1, 7-5)	Camila Osorio; Nicolás Mejía (COL); L (6–2, 6-3)	1st place, gold medalist(s)
Naho Sato; Gilbert Soares Klier Júnior (BRA)	Mixed doubles	Georgia Drummy; Delmas N'tcha (MIX); W (6–1, 6-1)	Oksana Selekhmeteva; Carlos López Montagud (MIX); L (4-6, 7-6^{8}, [6]-[10])	did not advance			

== Triathlon ==
Japan qualified two athletes based on its performance at the 2018 Asian Youth Olympic Games Qualifier.

Individual

Athlete	Event	Swim (750m)	Trans 1	Bike (20 km)	Trans 2	Run (5 km)	Total Time	Rank
Teppei Tokuyama	Boys	9:59	0:29	29:10	0:34	17:38	57:50	23
Maki Uchida	Girls	9:32	0:55	32:16	0:32	22:05	1:05:20	25

Relay

Athlete	Event	Total Times per Athlete (Swim 250m, Bike 6.6 km, Run 1.8 km)	Total Group Time	Rank
Asia 1 Lee Jung-won (KOR); Teppei Tokuyama (JPN); Emma Ada Middleditch (SGP); Daniil Zubtsov (KAZ)	Mixed Relay	22:57 (8); 21:44 (9); 24:01 (7); 23:15 (10)	1:31:57	10
Asia 2 Maki Uchida (JPN); Hung Tik Long (HKG); Yu Xinying (CHN); Chong Xian Hao (MAS)	Mixed Relay	23:40 (13); 24:22 (14); 25:21 (11); 23:26 (11)	1:36:49 1P	13

== Weightlifting ==
Japan qualified one athlete based on its performance at the 2018 Asian Youth Championships.

Athlete	Event	Snatch		Clean & jerk		Total	Rank
Athlete	Event	Result	Rank	Result	Rank	Total	Rank
Sumire Hashimoto	Girls' -63 kg	75	7	95	8	170	8

== Wrestling ==
Boys

Athlete	Event	Group Stage			Final / BM / FM	
Athlete	Event	Opposition Score	Opposition Score	Rank	Opposition Score	Rank
Hayato Fujita	freestyle 55 kg	Vladyslav Ostapenko (UKR); L (4–10)	Robert Howard (USA); L (2–13)	3	Gavin Whitt (GUM); W (10–0)	5
Wataru Sasaki	Greco-Roman 51 kg	Mehdi Jouini (TUN); W (9–0)	Axel Salas (MEX); W (10–1)	1	Giorgi Tokhadze (GEO); W (11–7)	1st place, gold medalist(s)
Shu Yamada	Greco-Roman 71 kg	Lynch Santos (GUM); W (8–0)	Stepan Starodubtsev (RUS); L (2–4)	2	Lamjed Maafi (TUN); W (4–0)	3rd place, bronze medalist(s)

Girls

Athlete	Event	Group Stage					Final / BM	
Athlete	Event	Opposition Score	Opposition Score	Opposition Score	Opposition Score	Rank	Opposition Score	Rank
Nonoka Ozaki	freestyle 57 kg	Andrea López (MEX); W (8–2)	Kaetlyn-Rae Quintanilla (GUM); W (10–0)	Anastasia Blayvas (GER); W (10–0)	Hala Ahmed (EGY); W (10–0)	1	Anna Szél (HUN); W (10–0)	1st place, gold medalist(s)
Yuka Kagami	freestyle 73 kg	Milaimys Marín (CUB); L (1–4)	Ioana Ludgate (ASA); W (10–0)	Julia Fridlund (SWE); W (12–2)	Anika White (CAN); W (10–0)	2	Kseniya Dzibuk (BLR); W (8–0)	3rd place, bronze medalist(s)
