= Wrestling at the 2018 Summer Youth Olympics – Girls' freestyle 57 kg =

Girls' freestyle 57kg at the III Summer Youth Olympic Games
- Venue: Asia Pavilion
- Date: 13 October 2018
- Competitors: 10 from 10 nations

Medalists
1st place, gold medalist(s)		Nonoka Ozaki; Japan
2nd place, silver medalist(s)		Anna Szél; Hungary
3rd place, bronze medalist(s)		Anastasia Blayvas; Germany

The girls' freestyle 57 kg competition at the 2018 Summer Youth Olympics was held on 13 October, at the Asia Pavilion.

== Competition format ==
As there were ten wrestlers in a weight category, the pool phase will be run as a single group competing in a round-robin format. Ranking within the groups is used to determine the pairings for the final phase.

== Schedule ==
All times are in local time (UTC-3).

Date	Time	Round
Saturday, 13 October 2018	10:10; 11:00; 11:50; 12:40; 13:30; 18:00	Round 1 Round 2 Round 3 Round 4 Round 5 Finals

== Results ==
Legend

- F — Won by fall
- WO — Won by Walkover

Group Stages

Qualified for the Gold-medal match
Qualified for the Bronze-medal match
Qualified for the 5th/6th Place Match
Qualified for the 7th/8th Place Match
Qualified for the 9th/10th Place Match

Group A

Pos	Athlete	Pld	W	L	CP	TP	Qualification
1	Anna Szél (HUN)	4	4	0	17	26	Gold-medal match
2	Irina Rîngaci (MDA)	4	3	1	12	26	Bronze-medal match
3	Mayra Parra (VEN)	4	2	2	8	21	Classification 5th/6th place match
4	Mansi Ahlawat (IND)	4	1	3	4	18	Classification 7th/8th place match
5	Lydia Toida (CMR)	4	0	4	1	6	Classification 9th/10th place match

Source: UWW

	Score		CP
Anna Szél (HUN)	8–2 Fall	Lydia Toida (CMR)	5–0 VFA
Irina Rîngaci (MDA)	11–2	Mayra Parra (VEN)	3–1 VPO1
Mansi Ahlawat (IND)	0–6	Anna Szél (HUN)	0–3 VPO
Lydia Toida (CMR)	0–11	Irina Rîngaci (MDA)	0–4 VSU
Mayra Parra (VEN)	0–10	Anna Szél (HUN)	0–4 VSU
Mansi Ahlawat (IND)	10–4	Lydia Toida (CMR)	3–1 VPO1
Irina Rîngaci (MDA)	0–2 Fall	Anna Szél (HUN)	0–5 VFA
Mayra Parra (VEN)	9–8	Mansi Ahlawat (IND)	3–1 VPO1
Lydia Toida (CMR)	0–10	Mayra Parra (VEN)	0–4 VSU
Irina Rîngaci (MDA)	4–0 Fall	Mansi Ahlawat (IND)	5–0 VFA

Group B

Pos	Athlete	Pld	W	L	CP	TP	Qualification
1	Nonoka Ozaki (JPN)	4	4	0	17	38	Gold-medal match
2	Anastasia Blayvas (GER)	4	3	1	13	8	Bronze-medal match
3	Andrea López (MEX)	4	2	2	8	14	Classification 5th/6th place match
4	Hala Wael (EGY)	4	1	3	5	14	Classification 7th/8th place match
5	Kaetlyn-Rae Quintanilla (GUM)	4	0	4	1	2	Classification 9th/10th place match

Source: UWW

	Score		CP
Nonoka Ozaki (JPN)	8–2 Fall	Andrea López (MEX)	5–0 VFA
Hala Wael (EGY)	0–4	Anastasia Blayvas (GER)	0–3 VPO
Kaetlyn-Rae Quintanilla (GUM)	0–10	Nonoka Ozaki (JPN)	0–4 VSU
Andrea López (MEX)	8–2	Hala Wael (EGY)	3–1 VPO1
Anastasia Blayvas (GER)	0–10	Nonoka Ozaki (JPN)	0–4 VSU
Kaetlyn-Rae Quintanilla (GUM)	0–4 Fall	Andrea López (MEX)	0–5 VFA
Hala Wael (EGY)	0–10	Nonoka Ozaki (JPN)	0–4 VSU
Anastasia Blayvas (GER)	2–0 Fall	Kaetlyn-Rae Quintanilla (GUM)	5–0 VFA
Andrea López (MEX)	0–2 Fall	Anastasia Blayvas (GER)	0–5 VFA
Hala Wael (EGY)	12–2	Kaetlyn-Rae Quintanilla (GUM)	4–1 VSU1

=== Finals ===
Gold-medal match
Anna Szél (HUN)	0
Nonoka Ozaki (JPN)	10

Bronze-medal match
Irina Rîngaci (MDA)	3
Anastasia Blayvas (GER)	6

Classification 5th/6th place match
Mayra Parra (VEN)	0
Andrea López (MEX)	7

Classification 7th/8th place match
Mansi Ahlawat (IND)	0
Hala Wael (EGY)	4^{F}

Classification 9th/10th place match
~~Lydia Toida (CMR)~~
Kaetlyn-Rae Quintanilla (GUM)	WO

== Final rankings ==
Rank	Athlete
1st place, gold medalist(s)	Nonoka Ozaki (JPN)
2nd place, silver medalist(s)	Anna Szél (HUN)
3rd place, bronze medalist(s)	Anastasia Blayvas (GER)
4	Irina Rîngaci (MDA)
5	Andrea López (MEX)
6	Mayra Parra (VEN)
7	Hala Wael (EGY)
8	Mansi Ahlawat (IND)
9	Kaetlyn-Rae Quintanilla (GUM)
–	Lydia Toida (CMR)
