= Moldova at the 2018 Summer Youth Olympics =

- IOC code: MDA
- NOC: National Olympic Committee of the Republic of Moldova
- Website: www.olympic.md (in Romanian, English, and Russian)

in Buenos Aires
- Competitors: 17 in 10 sports
- Medals Ranked 39th: Gold 2 Silver 0 Bronze 0 Total 2

Summer Youth Olympics appearances
- 2010; 2014; 2018; 2026

Moldova competed at the 2018 Summer Youth Olympics, in Buenos Aires, Argentina from 6 October to 18 October 2018.

== Archery ==
Moldova qualified one athlete based on its performance at the 2017 World Archery Youth Championships.

Athlete	Event	Ranking round		Round of 32	Round of 16	Quarterfinals	Semifinals	Final / BM	
Athlete	Event	Score	Seed	Opposition Score	Opposition Score	Opposition Score	Opposition Score	Opposition Score	Rank
Milena Gațco	Girls' individual	638	16	Voropayeva (KAZ); L 4–6	did not advance				17

Team

Athletes	Event	Ranking round		Round of 32	Round of 16	Quarterfinals	Semifinals	Final / BM	Rank
Athletes	Event	Score	Seed	Opposition Score	Opposition Score	Opposition Score	Opposition Score	Opposition Score	Rank
Milena Gațco (MDA); Jason Hurnall (AUS)	Mixed team	1301	10	Trydvornava (BLR); Ovchynnikov (UKR); L 3–5	did not advance				17

== Athletics ==
- Women's Shot Put - Nina Capaţina

Athlete	Event	Stage 1		Stage 2		Total	
Athlete	Event	Result	Rank	Result	Rank	Total	Rank
Nina Capaţina	Girls' shot put	17.09	4	17.42	3	34.51	4

== Badminton ==
Moldova qualified two players based on the Badminton Junior World Rankings.

Singles

Athlete	Event	Group stage				Quarterfinal	Semifinal	Final / BM	Rank
Athlete	Event	Opposition Score	Opposition Score	Opposition Score	Rank	Opposition Score	Opposition Score	Opposition Score	Rank
Cristian Savin	Boys' Singles	Panarin (KAZ); L 1–2	Naraoka (JPN); L 0–2	Kim (FIJ); W 2–0	3	did not advance			9
Vlada Gînga	Girls' Singles	Polanc (SLO); W 2–1	Sándorházi (HUN); L 0–2	—N/a	2	did not advance			9

Team

Athlete	Event	Group stage				Quarterfinal	Semifinal	Final / BM	Rank
Athlete	Event	Opposition Score	Opposition Score	Opposition Score	Rank	Opposition Score	Opposition Score	Opposition Score	Rank
Team Sigma; Cristian Savin (MDA); Dennis Koppen (NED); Rukesh Maharjan (NEP); Ikhsan Rumbay (INA); Madeleine Caren Akoumba Ze (CMR); Grace King (GBR); Ann-Kathrin Spöri (GER); Wang Zhiyi (CHN)	Mixed Teams	Theta (MIX); W (110–100)	Gamma (MIX); W (110–86)	Omega (MIX); L (98–110)	2Q	Zeta (MIX); L (106–110)	did not advance		5
Team Epsilon; Vlada Gînga (MDA); Chen Shiau-cheng (TPE); Fabricio Farias (BRA); Nguyễn Hải Đăng (VIE); Tomás Toledano (ESP); Goh Jin Wei (MAS); Aminat Oluwafunke Ilori (NGR); Nazlıcan İnci (TUR)	Mixed Teams	Alpha (MIX); L (98–110)	Zeta (MIX); L (89–110)	Delta (MIX); W (110–108)	4Q	Omega (MIX); L (102–110)	did not advance		5

== Judo ==
- Girls' 44 kg - Paulina Țurcan
- Boys' 100 kg - Alin Bagrin

Individual

Athlete	Event	Round of 16	Quarterfinals	Semifinals	Rep 1	Rep 2	Rep 3	Final / BM	
Athlete	Event	Opposition Result	Opposition Result	Opposition Result	Opposition Result	Opposition Result	Opposition Result	Opposition Result	Rank
Paulina Țurcan	Girls' 44 kg	Anastasia Balaban (UKR); L 00-10	did not advance		Giorgia Hagianu (ROU); L00-01s1	did not advance			
Alin Bagrin	Boys' 100 kg	Bye	Zsombor Vég (HUN); L 00-10	did not advance	Bye	Fleury Nihozeko (BDI); W 10-00	Abolfazl Shojaei (IRI); W 10s1-01	Ömer Aydın (TUR); L 01-10	5

Team

Athletes	Event	Round of 16	Quarterfinals	Semifinals	Final	
Athletes	Event	Opposition Result	Opposition Result	Opposition Result	Opposition Result	Rank
Team Los Angeles; Soniya Bhatta (NEP); Ariel Shulman (ISR); Nahomys Acosta Batte (CUB); Turpal Djoukaev (FIN); Saskia Brothers (AUS); Georgios Balarjishvili (CYP); Raffaela Igl (GER); Alin Bagrin (MDA)	Mixed team	Team Seoul (MIX); W 5–3	Team Athens (MIX); L 3–5	did not advance		5
Team Moscow; Augusta Ambourouet (GAB); Alessia Corrao (BEL); Temuujin Ganburged (MGL); Alexis Harrison Ayarza (PAN); Hamza Jashari (MKD); Paulina Țurcan (MDA); Zsombor Vég (HUN)	Mixed team	Team Singapore (MIX); W 4–3	Team London (MIX); L 3–4	did not advance		

== Modern pentathlon ==
- Boy's events - Alex Vasilianov

Athlete	Event	Fencing Ranking round (épée one touch)			Swimming (200 m freestyle)			Fencing Bonus round (épée one touch)		Combined: Shooting / Running (10 m air pistol) / (3200 m)			Total points	Final rank
Athlete	Event	Results	Rank	Points	Time	Rank	Points	Results	Points	Time	Rank	Points	Total points	Final rank
Alex Vasilianov	Boys' Individual	10–13	17	202	2:13.35	19	284	1–0	0	11:51.71	12	589	1075	14
Martina Armanazqui (ARG); Alex Vasilianov (MDA)	Mixed relay	10–12; 12–10	11	205	2:02.59	9	305	2–0	2	11:52.56	10	588	1100	9

== Rowing ==
Moldova qualified one boat based on its performance at the 2018 European Rowing Junior Championships.

- Boys' single sculls - 1 boat (Ivan Corșunov)

Athlete	Event	Round 1		Round 2		Round 3		Total			Quarterfinals		Semifinals		Final	
Athlete	Event	Time	Rank	Time	Points	Time	Points	Time	Points	Rank	Time	Rank	Time	Rank	Time	Rank
Ivan Corșunov	Boys' single sculls	3:40.33	12	1:41.40	6	1:40.00	6	3:21.40	12	4 Q	1:37.32	1 FB	did not advance		1:40.06	2

FB=Final B (non-medal)

== Shooting ==
- 1 quota: Boys' 10 metre air pistol

Individual

Athlete	Event	Qualification		Final	
Athlete	Event	Points	Rank	Points	Rank
Kirill Ușanlî	Boys' 10 metre air pistol	558-11	13	did not advance	

Team

Athletes	Event	Qualification		Round of 16	Quarterfinals	Semifinals	Final / BM	Rank
Athletes	Event	Points	Rank	Opposition Result	Opposition Result	Opposition Result	Opposition Result	Rank
Greta Rankelytė (LTU); Kirill Ușanlî (MDA)	Mixed 10 metre air pistol	752-23	4	Lu (CHN); Vengríni (SVK); W 10-7	Bhaker (IND); Fayzullaev (TJK); L8-10	did not advance		

== Swimming ==
- Tatiana Salcuțan
- Anastasia Moșcenscaia
- Nichita Bortnicov
- Ivan Semidetnov

== Table tennis ==
Moldova qualified one table tennis player based on its performance at the European Continental Qualifier.

- Boys' singles - Vladislav Ursu

== Wrestling ==
Moldova qualified one athlete in category Women's Wrestling 57 kg

Key:
- VFA – Victory by Fall
- VSU – Without any points scored by the opponent
- VSU1 – With point(s) scored by the opponent
- VPO – Without any points scored by the opponent
- VPO1 – With point(s) scored by the opponent

Athlete	Event	Group stage					Final / RM	Rank
Athlete	Event	Opposition Score	Opposition Score	Opposition Score	Opposition Score	Rank	Opposition Score	Rank
Alexandrin Guţu	Boys' Greco-Roman −71kg	Calle (COL); W 4 – 0 ^{VFA}	Maafi (TUN); W 9 – 0 ^{VSU}	—N/a		1 Q	Starodubtsev (RUS); W 8 – 0 ^{VFA}	1st place, gold medalist(s)
Maria Leorda	Girls' freestyle −43kg	Derry (NZL); W WO	Batbaatar (MGL); L 0 – 10 ^{VSU}	Simran (IND); L 0 – 8 ^{VFA}	Mahmoud (EGY); W 8 – 1 ^{VPO1}	3 Q	Vigouroux (FRA); L 0 – 4 ^{VPO}	6
Irina Rîngaci	Girls' freestyle −57kg	Parra (VEN); W 11 – 2 ^{VPO1}	Toida (CMR); W 11 – 0 ^{VSU}	Szél (HUN); L 0 – 2 ^{VFA}	Mansi (IND); W 4 – 0 ^{VFA}	2 Q	Blayvas (GER); L 3 – 6 ^{VPO1}	4
