= Cameroon at the 2018 Summer Youth Olympics =

- IOC code: CMR
- NOC: Cameroon Olympic and Sports Committee
- Website: http://www.cnosc.org/

in Buenos Aires, Argentina 6 – 18 October 2018
- Competitors: 16 in 6 sports
- Medals: Gold 0 Silver 0 Bronze 0 Total 0

Summer Youth Olympics appearances
- 2010; 2014; 2018

Cameroon participated at the 2018 Summer Youth Olympics in Buenos Aires, Argentina from 6 October to 18 October 2018.

== Competitors ==
Sport	Boys	Girls	Total
Athletics	1	0	1
Badminton	0	1	1
Futsal	0	10	10
Judo	1	0	1
Wrestling	0	2	2
Total	2	13	15

== Athletics ==
Athlete	Event	Stage 1	Stage 2	Final Placing
Raphael Ngaguele Mberlina	Boys' 100 m	10.98	10.51	5

== Badminton ==
Cameroon was given a quota to compete by the tripartite committee.

- Girls' singles – 1 quota

Singles

Athlete	Event	Group stage				Quarterfinal	Semifinal	Final / BM	Rank
Athlete	Event	Opposition Score	Opposition Score	Opposition Score	Rank	Opposition Score	Opposition Score	Opposition Score	Rank
Madeleine Caren Akoumba Ze	Girls' Singles	Delcheva (BUL); L (5–21, 9–21)	Vũ (VIE); L (6–21, 4–21)	Prozorova (UKR); L (4–21, 6–21)	4	did not advance			9

Team

Athlete	Event	Group stage				Quarterfinal	Semifinal	Final / BM	Rank
Athlete	Event	Opposition Score	Opposition Score	Opposition Score	Rank	Opposition Score	Opposition Score	Opposition Score	Rank
Team Sigma; Madeleine Caren Akoumba Ze (CMR); Dennis Koppen (NED); Rukesh Maharjan (NEP); Ikhsan Rumbay (INA); Cristian Savin (MDA); Grace King (GBR); Ann-Kathrin Spöri (GER); Wang Zhiyi (CHN)	Mixed Teams	Theta (MIX); W (110–100)	Gamma (MIX); W (110–86)	Omega (MIX); L (98–110)	2Q	Zeta (MIX); L (106–110)	did not advance		5

== Futsal ==
Girls
Summary

Team	Event	Group Stage					Semifinal	Final / BM	
Team	Event	Opposition score	Opposition score	Opposition score	Opposition score	Rank	Opposition score	Opposition score	Rank
Cameroon	Girls' tournament	Dominican Republic; W 9–1	Japan; L 2–6	Portugal; L 0–6	Chile; W 5–0	3	did not advance		6

Group D

Pos	Team	Pld	W	D	L	GF	GA	GD	Pts	Qualification
1	Portugal	4	4	0	0	37	2	+35	12	Semi-finals
2	Japan	4	3	0	1	16	7	+9	9	Semi-finals
3	Cameroon	4	2	0	2	16	13	+3	6	
4	Chile	4	0	1	3	6	27	−21	1	
5	Dominican Republic	4	0	1	3	6	32	−26	1	

Source: FIFA IOC
7 October 2018
14:00

Dominican Republic	1–9	Cameroon
Muñiz 31'	Report (FIFA); Report (IOC) Category:Futsal at the 2018 Summer Youth Olympics – Girls First Round – DOM-CRM on Wikimedia Commons	Tchomte 9', 11', 13'; Ndzana 17', 35', 39'; Mbomozomo 22', 32'; Mbofewuie 37'

CeNARD
Attendance: 0
Referee: Gelareh Nazemi (Iran)
8 October 2018
14:00

Cameroon	2–6	Japan
Tchomte 29'; Kalieu 35'	Report (FIFA); Report (IOC)	Maeda 7', 36'; Yamakawa 8', 20'; Miyamoto 34'; Oino 38'

Tecnópolis
Attendance: 1,260
Referee: Andres Peña (Argentina)
10 October 2018
16:00

Cameroon	0–6	Portugal
	Report (FIFA); Report (IOC)	Fifó 2', 4', 23', 32'; Carol 16'; Leninha 32'

CeNARD
Attendance: 440
Referee: Rafael Villalba (Paraguay)
12 October 2018
14:00

Chile	0–5	Cameroon
	Report (FIFA); Report (IOC)	Ndzana 16', 18', 22'; Campos 28' (o.g.); Mbofewuie 33'

Tecnópolis
Attendance: 2,530
Referee: Rafael Villalba (Paraguay)

== Judo ==
Boys

Athlete	Event	Round of 16	Quarterfinals	Semifinals	Repechage 1	Repechage 2	Repechage 3	Repechage 4	Final	Rank
Athlete	Event	Opposition Result	Opposition Result	Opposition Result	Opposition Result	Opposition Result	Opposition Result	Opposition Result	Opposition Result	Rank
Jalen Kon Elijah	−66 kg	Nanekoula (GAB); W 10–0s2	Tornal (DOM); L 0–10	Did not advance	—		Santos (BRA); L 0–11	did not advance		9

Mixed team

Athlete	Event	Round of 16	Quarterfinals	Semifinals	Final	
Athlete	Event	Opposition Result	Opposition Result	Opposition Result	Opposition Result	Rank
Barcelona; Mikaela Rojas (ARG); Sosorbaram Lkhagvasuren (MGL); Nikol Pencue (COL); Margarita Gritsenko (KAZ); Loreince Nanekoula (GAB); Jalen Kon Elijah (CMR); Mark van Dijk (NED)	Mixed team	Atlanta (MIX); L 3-4	did not advance			9

== Weightlifting ==
Cameroon was given a quota by the tripartite committee to compete in weightlifting.

Athlete	Event	Snatch		Clean & Jerk		Total	Rank
Athlete	Event	Result	Rank	Result	Rank	Total	Rank
Hermann Junior Ngaina II	Boys' −77 kg	120	4	143	5	263	5

== Wrestling ==
Key:
- VFA – Victory by Fall
- VSU – Without any points scored by the opponent
- VSU1 – With point(s) scored by the opponent
- VPO – Without any points scored by the opponent
- VPO1 – With point(s) scored by the opponent

Athlete	Event	Group stage					Final / RM	Rank
Athlete	Event	Opposition Score	Opposition Score	Opposition Score	Opposition Score	Rank	Opposition Score	Rank
Lydia Toida	Girls' freestyle −57kg	Szél (HUN); L 2 – 8 ^{VFA}	Ringaci (MDA); L 0 – 11 ^{VSU}	Mansi (IND); L 4 – 10 ^{VPO1}	Parra Alvarez (VEN); L 0 – 10 ^{VSU}	5 Q	Quintanilla (GUM); L WO	10
Natacha Nabaina	Girls' freestyle −65kg	Balogun (NGR); L 0 – 10 ^{VSU}	Chudyk (UKR); L 3 – 10 ^{VPO1}	Sghaier (TUN); L 6 – 10 ^{VFA}	Vesso (EST); L 0 – 2 ^{VFA}	5 Q	Escamilla (MEX); L WO	10
