= Wrestling at the 2018 Summer Youth Olympics – Boys' Greco-Roman 71 kg =

Boys' Greco-Roman 71kg at the III Summer Youth Olympic Games
- Venue: Asia Pavilion
- Date: 12 October
- Competitors: 6 from 6 nations

Medalists
1st place, gold medalist(s)		Alexandrin Guțu	Moldova
2nd place, silver medalist(s)		Stepan Starodubtsev	Russia
3rd place, bronze medalist(s)		Shu Yamada	Japan

The Boys' Greco-Roman 71 kg competition at the 2018 Summer Youth Olympics was held on 12 October, at the Asia Pavilion.

== Competition format ==
As there were less than six wrestlers in a weight category, the pool phase will be run as a single group competing in a round robin format. Ranking within the groups is used to determine the pairings for the final phase.

== Schedule ==
All times are in local time (UTC-3).

Date	Time	Round
Friday, 12 October 2018	10:15; 10:40; 11:05; 18:05	Round 1 Round 2 Round 3 Finals

== Results ==
Legend

- F — Won by fall

Group stages

Qualified for the Gold Medal Match
Qualified for the Bronze Medal Match
Qualified for the 5th/6th Place Match

Group A

Pos	Athlete	Pld	W	L	CP	TP	Qualification
1	Alexandrin Guțu (MDA)	2	2	0	9	13	Gold-medal match
2	Lamjed Maafi (TUN)	2	1	1	3	8	Bronze-medal match
3	Brandon Calle (COL)	2	0	2	1	8	Classification 5th/6th place match

Source: UWW

	Score		CP
Alexandrin Guțu (MDA)	4–0 Fall	Brandon Calle (COL)	5–0 VFA
Lamjed Maafi (TUN)	0–9	Alexandrin Guțu (MDA)	0–4 VSU
Brandon Calle (COL)	8–8	Lamjed Maafi (TUN)	1–3 VPO1

Group B

Pos	Athlete	Pld	W	L	CP	TP	Qualification
1	Stepan Starodubtsev (RUS)	2	2	0	7	12	Gold-medal match
2	Shu Yamada (JPN)	2	1	1	5	10	Bronze-medal match
3	Lynch Santos (GUM)	2	0	2	0	0	Classification 5th/6th place match

Source: UWW

	Score		CP
Shu Yamada (JPN)	8–0	Lynch Santos (GUM)	4–0 VSU
Stepan Starodubtsev (RUS)	4–2	Shu Yamada (JPN)	3–1 VPO1
Lynch Santos (GUM)	0–8	Stepan Starodubtsev (RUS)	0–4 VSU

=== Finals ===
Gold medal match
Alexandrin Guțu (MDA)	8^{F}
Stepan Starodubtsev (RUS)	0

Bronze medal match
Lamjed Maafi (TUN)	0
Shu Yamada (JPN)	4

Classification 5th/6th place match
Brandon Calle (COL)	14
Lynch Santos (GUM)	6

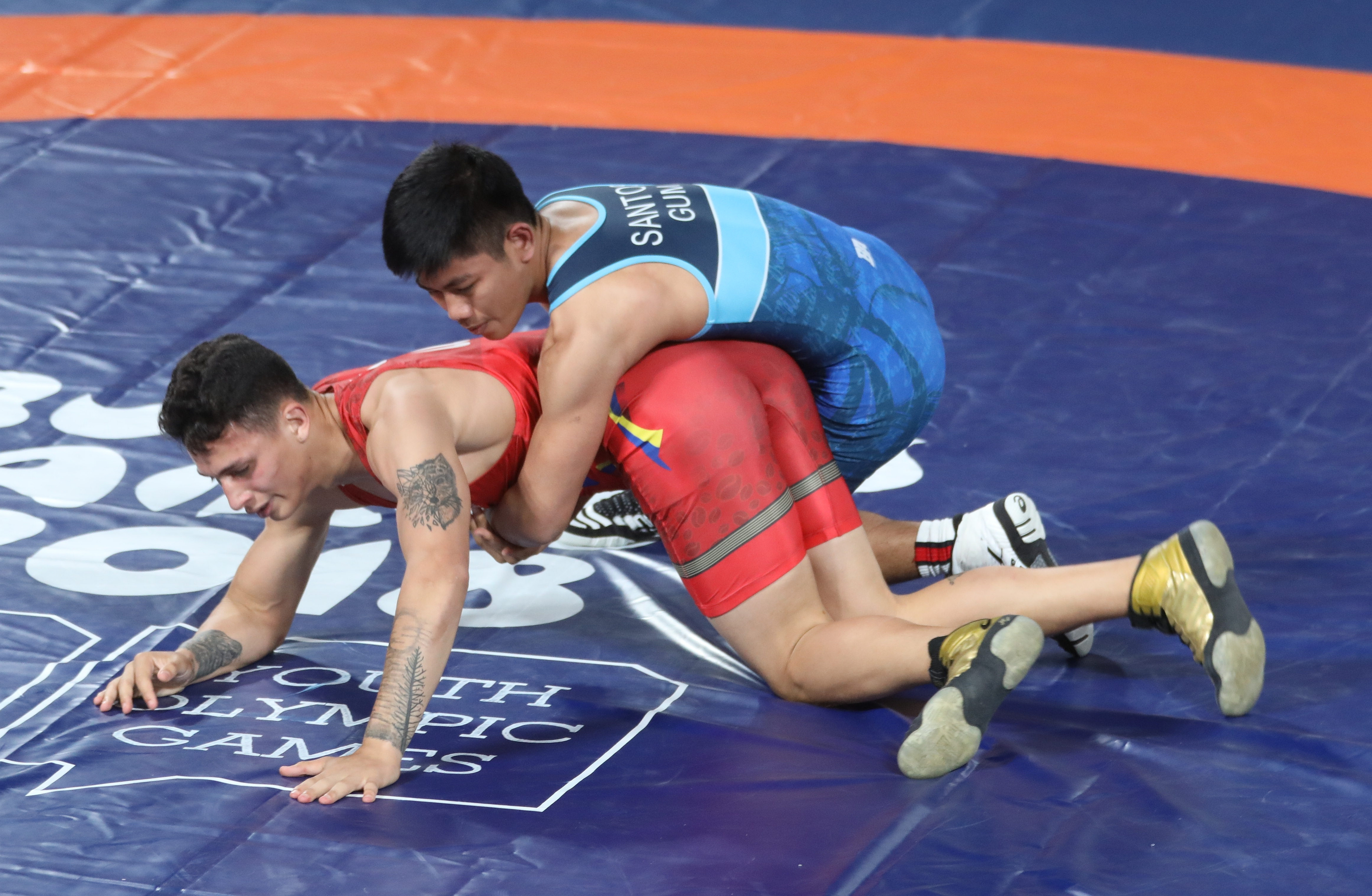
Classification 5th/6th Place Match: Brandon Calle vs. Lynch Santos (on top)

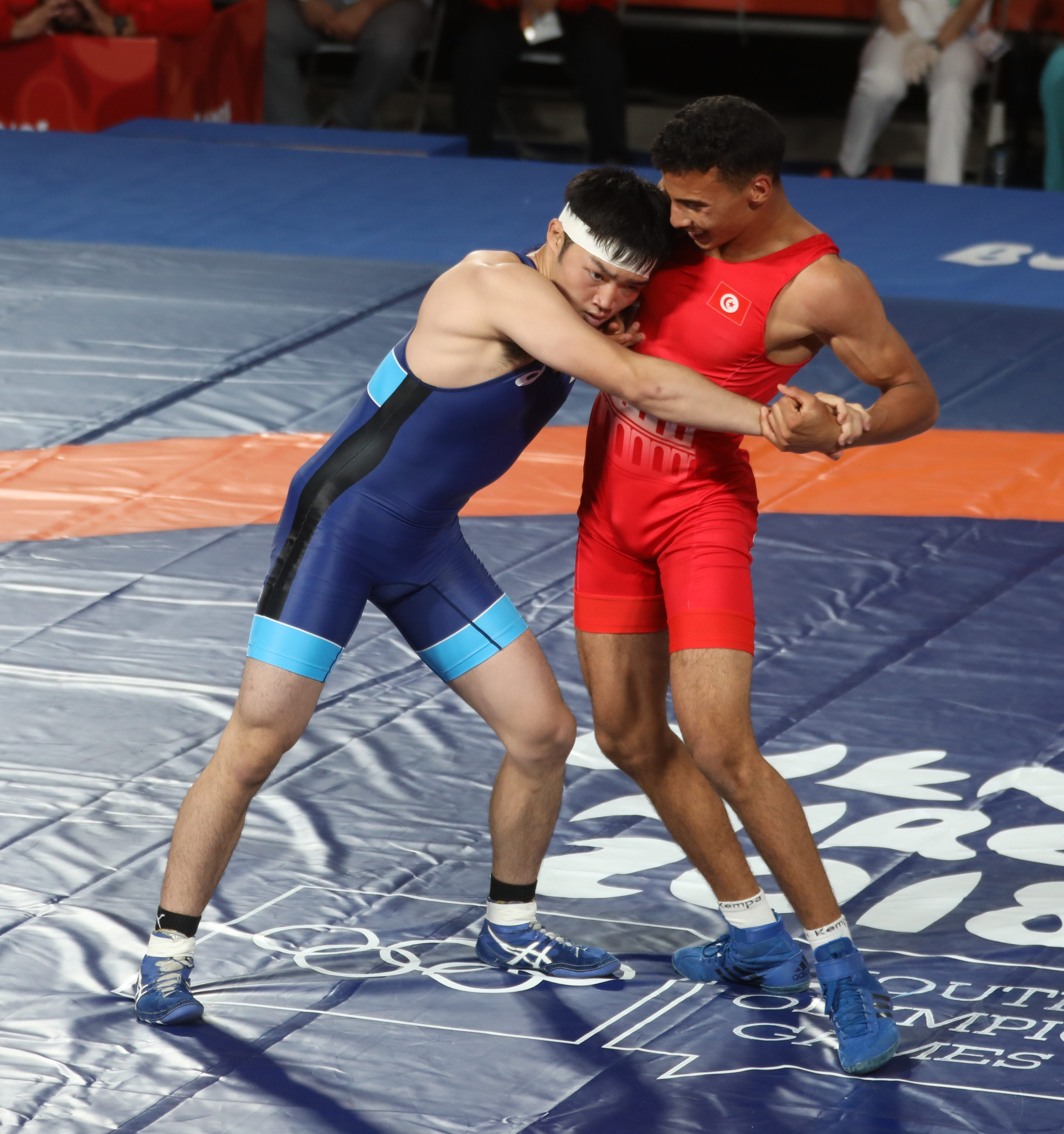
Bronze Medal Match: Lamjed Maafi (right) vs. Shu Yamada

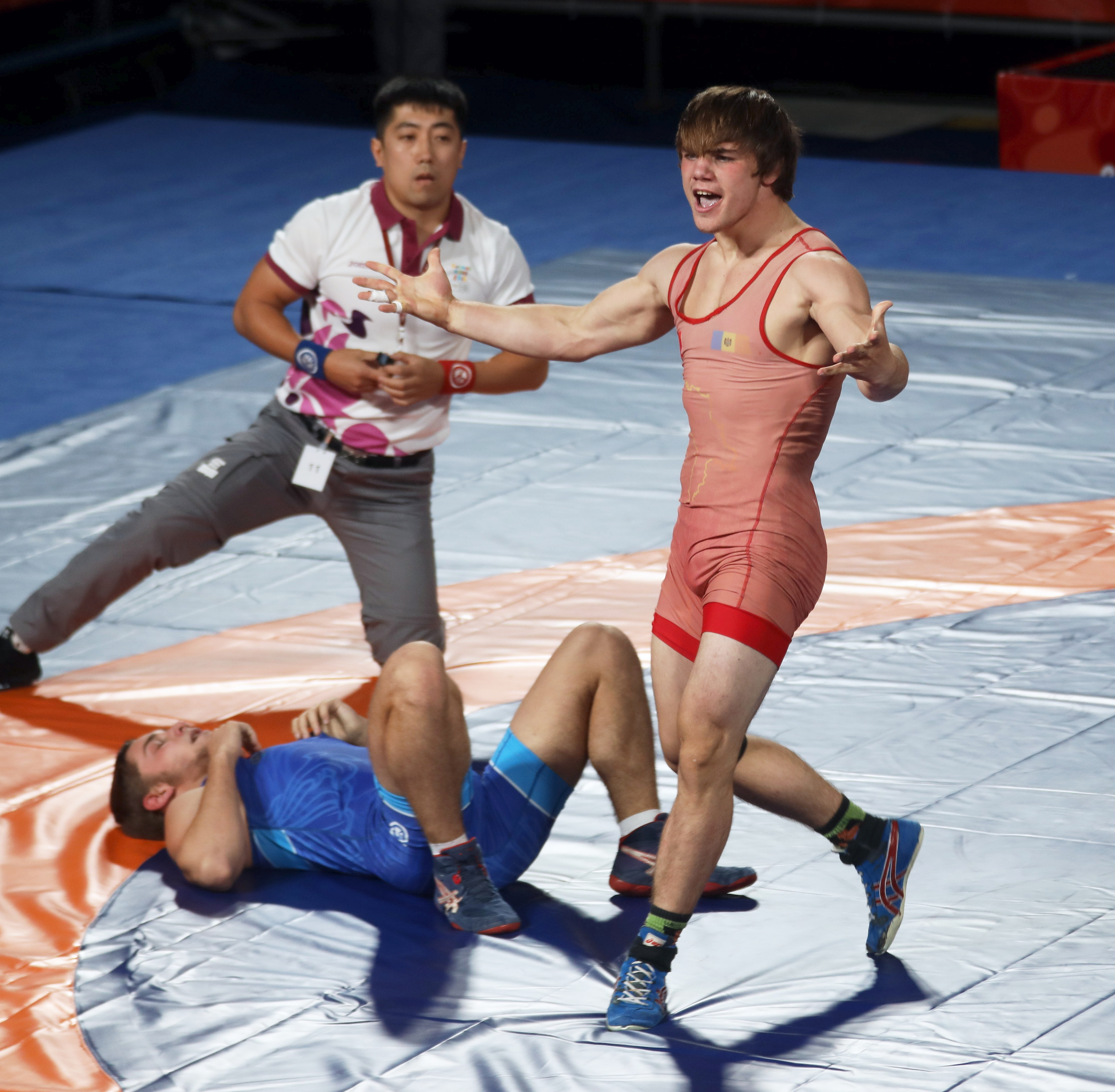
Gold Medal Match: Alexandrin Guțu (right) vs. Stepan Starodubtsev

== Final rankings ==
Rank	Athlete
1st place, gold medalist(s)	Alexandrin Guțu (MDA)
2nd place, silver medalist(s)	Stepan Starodubtsev (RUS)
3rd place, bronze medalist(s)	Shu Yamada (JPN)
4	Lamjed Maafi (TUN)
5	Brandon Calle (COL)
6	Lynch Santos (GUM)

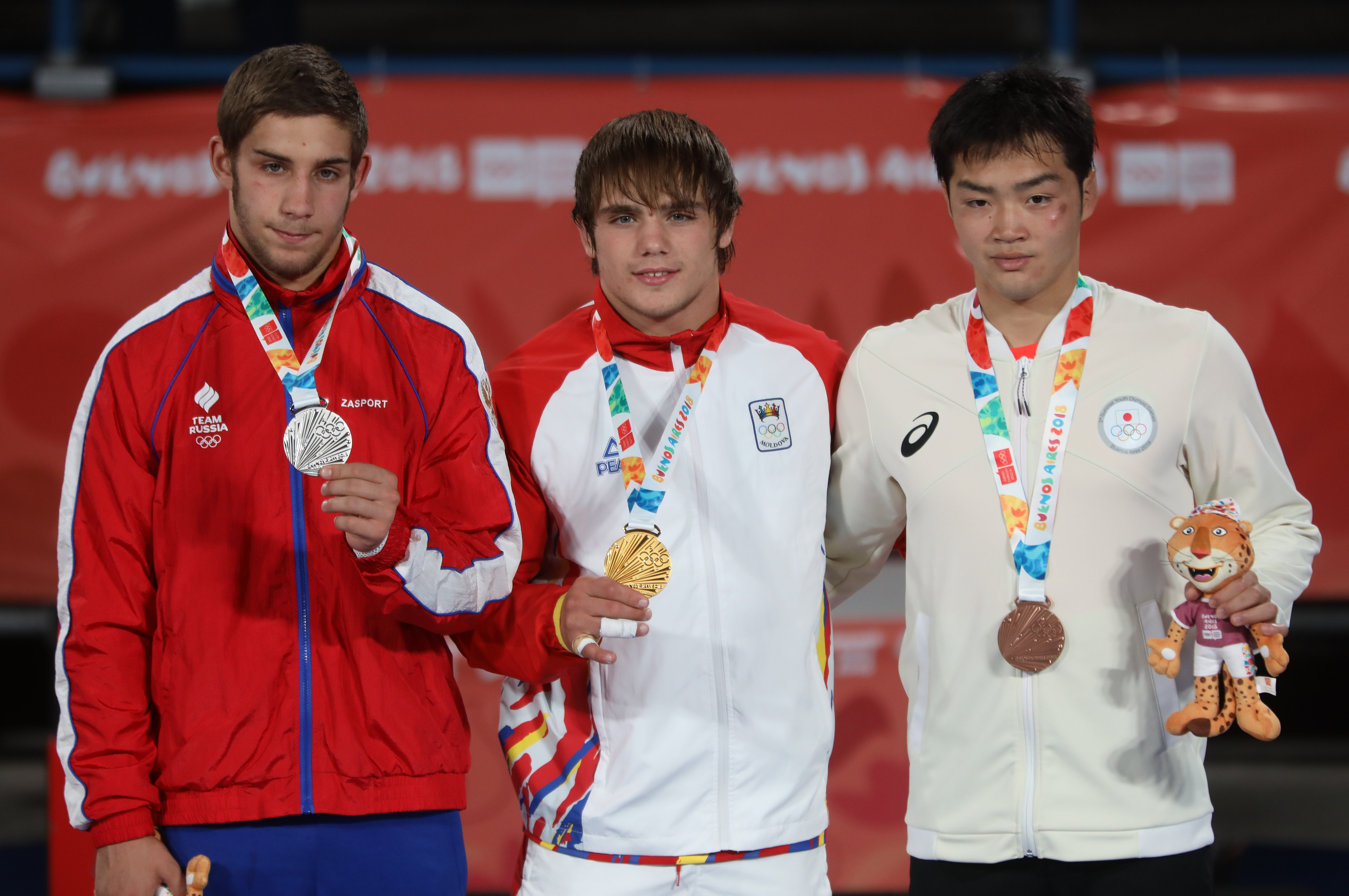
Victory ceremony (from left to right): Stepan Starodubtsev (Silver), Alexandrin Guțu (Gold), Shu Yamada (Bronze)
