= Wrestling at the 2018 Summer Youth Olympics – Girls' freestyle 49 kg =

Girls' freestyle 49kg at the III Summer Youth Olympic Games
- Venue: Asia Pavilion
- Date: 13 October 2018
- Competitors: 10 from 10 nations

Medalists
1st place, gold medalist(s)		Jonna Malmgren; Sweden
2nd place, silver medalist(s)		Shokhida Akhmedova; Uzbekistan
3rd place, bronze medalist(s)		Natallia Varakina; Belarus

The girls' freestyle 49 kg competition at the 2018 Summer Youth Olympics was held on 13 October, at the Asia Pavilion.

== Competition format ==
As there were ten wrestlers in a weight category, the pool phase will be run as a single group competing in a round-robin format. Ranking within the groups is used to determine the pairings for the final phase.

== Schedule ==
All times are in local time (UTC-3).

Date	Time	Round
Saturday, 13 October 2018	10:05; 10:55; 11:45; 12:35; 13:25; 17:25	Round 1 Round 2 Round 3 Round 4 Round 5 Finals

== Results ==
Legend

- F — Won by fall

Group Stages

Qualified for the Gold-medal match
Qualified for the Bronze-medal match
Qualified for the 5th/6th Place Match
Qualified for the 7th/8th Place Match
Qualified for the 9th/10th Place Match

Group A

Pos	Athlete	Pld	W	L	CP	TP	Qualification
1	Shokhida Akhmedova (UZB)	4	4	0	16	35	Gold-medal match
2	Natallia Varakina (BLR)	4	3	1	11	25	Bronze-medal match
3	Tiare Ikei (USA)	4	2	2	7	28	Classification 5th/6th place match
4	María Mosquera (VEN)	4	1	3	6	20	Classification 7th/8th place match
5	Nilufar Raimova (KAZ)	4	0	4	1	8	Classification 9th/10th place match

Source: UWW

	Score		CP
María Mosquera (VEN)	3–8	Natallia Varakina (BLR)	1–3 VPO1
Nilufar Raimova (KAZ)	0–11	Shokhida Akhmedova (UZB)	0–4 VSU
Tiare Ikei (USA)	12–2	María Mosquera (VEN)	4–1 VSU1
Natallia Varakina (BLR)	10–0	Nilufar Raimova (KAZ)	4–0 VSU
Shokhida Akhmedova (UZB)	12–1	María Mosquera (VEN)	4–1 VSU1
Tiare Ikei (USA)	0–6	Natallia Varakina (BLR)	0–3 VPO
Nilufar Raimova (KAZ)	8–14	María Mosquera (VEN)	1–3 VPO1
Shokhida Akhmedova (UZB)	9–8 Fall	Tiare Ikei (USA)	5–0 VFA
Natallia Varakina (BLR)	1–3	Shokhida Akhmedova (UZB)	1–3 VPO1
Nilufar Raimova (KAZ)	0–8	Tiare Ikei (USA)	0–3 VPO

Group B

Pos	Athlete	Pld	W	L	CP	TP	Qualification
1	Jonna Malmgren (SWE)	4	4	0	20	18	Gold-medal match
2	Zineb Ech-Chabki (MAR)	4	3	1	12	28	Bronze-medal match
3	Róza Szenttamási (HUN)	4	2	2	11	14	Classification 5th/6th place match
4	Paulina Duenas (GUM)	4	1	3	5	9	Classification 7th/8th place match
5	Sopealai Sim (CAM)	4	0	4	0	10	Classification 9th/10th place match

Source: UWW

	Score		CP
Róza Szenttamási (HUN)	4–8	Zineb Ech-Chabki (MAR)	1–3 VPO1
Jonna Malmgren (SWE)	6–0 Fall	Paulina Duenas (GUM)	5–0 VFA
Sopealai Sim (CAM)	0–4 Fall	Róza Szenttamási (HUN)	0–5 VFA
Zineb Ech-Chabki (MAR)	0–4 Fall	Jonna Malmgren (SWE)	0–5 VFA
Paulina Duenas (GUM)	0–6 Fall	Róza Szenttamási (HUN)	0–5 VFA
Sopealai Sim (CAM)	0–8 Fall	Zineb Ech-Chabki (MAR)	0–5 VFA
Jonna Malmgren (SWE)	6–0 Fall	Róza Szenttamási (HUN)	5–0 VFA
Paulina Duenas (GUM)	9–10 Fall	Sopealai Sim (CAM)	5–0 VFA
Zineb Ech-Chabki (MAR)	12–0	Paulina Duenas (GUM)	4–0 VSU
Jonna Malmgren (SWE)	2–0 Fall	Sopealai Sim (CAM)	5–0 VFA

=== Finals ===
Gold-medal match
Shokhida Akhmedova (UZB)	2
Jonna Malmgren (SWE)	2^{F}

Bronze-medal match
Natallia Varakina (BLR)	12
Zineb Ech-Chabki (MAR)	1

Classification 5th/6th place match
Tiare Ikei (USA)	0
Róza Szenttamási (HUN)	3

Classification 7th/8th place match
María Mosquera (VEN)	10
Paulina Duenas (GUM)	0

Classification 9th/10th place match
Nilufar Raimova (KAZ)	WO
~~Sopealai Sim (CAM)~~

== Final rankings ==
Rank	Athlete
1st place, gold medalist(s)	Jonna Malmgren (SWE)
2nd place, silver medalist(s)	Shokhida Akhmedova (UZB)
3rd place, bronze medalist(s)	Natallia Varakina (BLR)
4	Zineb Ech-Chabki (MAR)
5	Róza Szenttamási (HUN)
6	Tiare Ikei (USA)
7	María Mosquera (VEN)
8	Paulina Duenas (GUM)
9	Nilufar Raimova (KAZ)
—	Sopealai Sim (CAM)
