= Cambodia at the 2018 Summer Youth Olympics =

- IOC code: CAM
- NOC: National Olympic Committee of Cambodia

in Buenos Aires, Argentina 6 – 18 October 2018
- Competitors: 3 in 3 sports
- Medals: Gold 0 Silver 0 Bronze 0 Total 0

Summer Youth Olympics appearances
- 2010; 2014; 2018

Cambodia participated at the 2018 Summer Youth Olympics in Buenos Aires, Argentina from 6 October to 18 October 2018.

== Competitors ==
The following is the list of number of competitors participating at the Games per sport/discipline.

Sport	Men	Women	Total
Badminton	1	0	1
Swimming	1	0	1
Wrestling	0	1	1
Total	2	1	3

== Badminton ==
Cambodia was given a quota to compete by the tripartite committee.

Singles

Athlete	Event	Group stage				Quarterfinal	Semifinal	Final / BM	Rank
Athlete	Event	Opposition Score	Opposition Score	Opposition Score	Rank	Opposition Score	Opposition Score	Opposition Score	Rank
Vannthoun Vath	Boys' Singles	Vitidsarn (THA); L (9–21, 8–21)	Koh (SGP); L (3–21, 6–21)	Maharjan (NEP) no match	3	did not advance			9

Team

Athlete	Event	Group stage				Quarterfinal	Semifinal	Final / BM	Rank
Athlete	Event	Opposition Score	Opposition Score	Opposition Score	Rank	Opposition Score	Opposition Score	Opposition Score	Rank
Team Alpha; Vannthoun Vath (CAM); Lakshya Sen (IND); Giovanni Toti (ITA); Brian Yang (CAN); Hasini Nusaka Ambalangodage (SRI); Maria Delcheva (BUL); Jennie Gai (USA); Ashwathi Pillai (SWE)	Mixed Teams	Epsilon (MIX); W 110–98	Delta (MIX); L 99–110	Zeta (MIX); W 110–103	2 Q	Gamma (MIX); W 110–94	Theta (MIX); W 110–90	Omega (MIX); W 110–106	1st place, gold medalist(s)

== Swimming ==
Athlete	Event	Heat		Semifinal		Final	
Athlete	Event	Time	Rank	Time	Rank	Time	Rank
Bunna Poeuvpichra	Boys' 50 metre freestyle	28.11	46	did not advance			
Bunna Poeuvpichra	Boys' 50 metre butterfly	30.93	50	did not advance			

== Wrestling ==
Key:
- VFA – Victory by Fall
- VSU – Without any points scored by the opponent
- VSU1 – With point(s) scored by the opponent
- VPO – Without any points scored by the opponent
- VPO1 – With point(s) scored by the opponent

Athlete	Event	Group stage					Final / RM	Rank
Athlete	Event	Opposition Score	Opposition Score	Opposition Score	Opposition Score	Rank	Opposition Score	Rank
Sopealai Sim	Girls' freestyle −49kg	Szenttamási (HUN); L 0 – 4 ^{VFA}	Ech-Chabki (MAR); L 0 – 8 ^{VFA}	Duenas (GUM); L 10 – 9 ^{VFA}	Malmgren (SWE); L 0 – 2 ^{VFA}	5 Q	Raimova (KAZ); L WO	10
