= Guam at the 2018 Summer Youth Olympics =

- IOC code: GUM
- NOC: Guam National Olympic Committee
- Website: www.oceaniasport.com/guam/

in Buenos Aires, Argentina 6 – 18 October 2018
- Competitors: 4 in 1 sport
- Flag bearers: Paulina Duenas (opening); Lynch Santos (closing)
- Medals: Gold 0 Silver 0 Bronze 0 Total 0

Summer Youth Olympics appearances
- 2010; 2014; 2018

Guam participated at the 2018 Summer Youth Olympics in Buenos Aires, Argentina from 6 October to 18 October 2018.

== Competitors ==
Sport	Boy	Girl	Total
Wrestling	2	2	4
Total	2	2	4

== Wrestling ==
Key:

- VT – Victory by fall.
- PP – Decision by points – the loser with technical points.
- PO – Decision by points – the loser without technical points.
- SP – Technical superiority – the loser with technical points and a margin of victory of at least 8 (Greco-Roman) or 10 (freestyle) points.
- ST – Great superiority – the loser without technical points and a margin of victory of at least 8 (Greco-Roman) or 10 (freestyle) points.

Boys

Athlete	Event	Preliminary		Final / BM / CR	
Athlete	Event	Opposition Result		Opposition Result	Rank
Athlete	Event	Match 1	Match 2	Opposition Result	Rank
Gavin Whitt	Freestyle −55 kg	Oussama Laribi (ALG); L 0–10 ^{ST}	Hernán Almendra (ARG); L 0–4 ^{VT}	Hayato Fujita (JPN); L 0–10 ^{ST}	6
Lynch Santos	Greco-Roman −71 kg	Shu Yamada (JPN); L 0–8 ^{ST}	Stepan Starodubtsev (RUS); L 0–8 ^{ST}	Brandon Calle (COL); L 6–14 ^{SP}	6

Girls

Athlete	Event	Group Stage					Final / BM / CR	
Athlete	Event	Opposition Score	Opposition Score	Opposition Score	Opposition Score	Rank	Opposition Score	Rank
Paulina Duenas	Freestyle −49 kg	Jonna Malmgren (SWE); L 0–6 ^{VT}	Róza Szenttamási (HUN); L 0–6 ^{VT}	Sopealai Sim (CAM); W 9–10 ^{VT}	Zineb Ech-Chabki (MAR); L 0–12 ^{ST}	4	María Mosquera (VEN); L 0–10 ^{ST}	8
Kaetlyn-Rae Quintanilla	Freestyle −57 kg	Nonoka Ozaki (JPN); L 0–10 ^{ST}	Andrea López (MEX); L 0–4 ^{VT}	Anastasia Blayvas (GER); L 0–2 ^{VT}	Hala Ahmed (EGY); L 2–12 ^{SP}	5	Lydia Toida (CMR); W Walkover	9
