= Karate at the 2018 Summer Youth Olympics – Girls' 59 kg =

Karate competition

Girls' Kumite 59 kg at the III Summer Youth Olympic Games
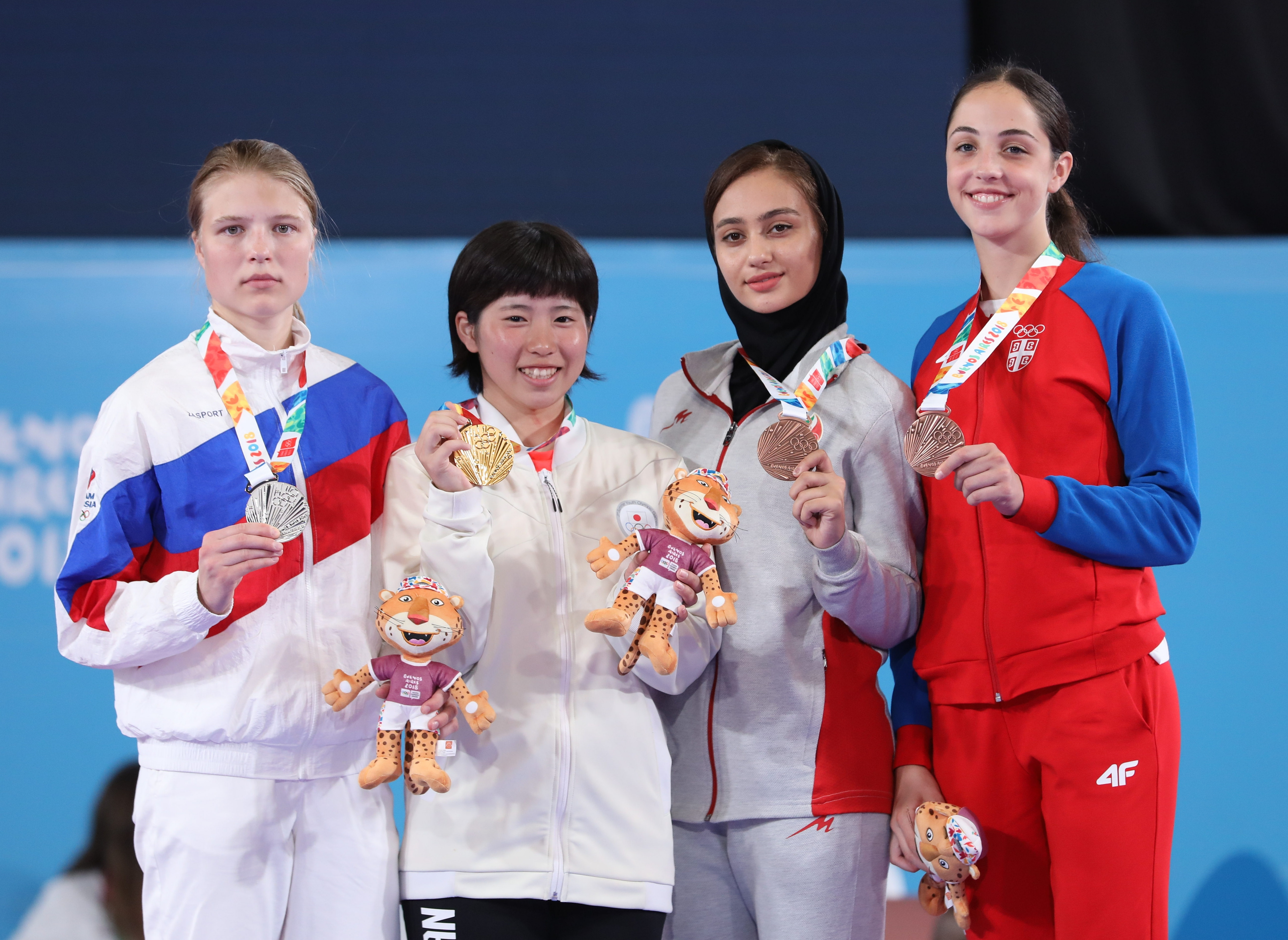
- Venue: Europa Pavilion
- Date: 17 October
- Competitors: 8 from 8 nations

Medalists
1st place, gold medalist(s)		Kokoro Sakaji	Japan
2nd place, silver medalist(s)		Anna Chernysheva	Russia
3rd place, bronze medalist(s)		Mobina Heidari	Iran
3rd place, bronze medalist(s)		Ivana Perović	Serbia

The girls' kumite –59 kg competition at the 2018 Summer Youth Olympics was held on 17 October at the Europa Pavilion in Buenos Aires, Argentina.

== Schedule ==
All times are local (UTC-3).

Date	Time	Round
Wednesday, 17 October	12:10	Elimination round
Wednesday, 17 October	15:30	Semifinals
Wednesday, 17 October	15:56	Final

== Results ==
=== Elimination round ===
==== Pool A ====
Rank	Athlete	B	W	D	L	Pts	Score
1	Kokoro Sakaji (JPN)	3	3	0	0	6	6–0
2	Ivana Perović (SRB)	3	2	0	1	4	10–1
3	Zsófia Baranyi (HUN)	3	1	0	2	2	5–3
4	Marta Ossipova (EST)	3	0	0	3	0	0–17

	Score	
Kokoro Sakaji (JPN)	4–0	Marta Ossipova (EST)
Ivana Perović (SRB)	2–0	Zsófia Baranyi (HUN)
Ivana Perović (SRB)	8–0	Marta Ossipova (EST)
Kokoro Sakaji (JPN)	1–0	Zsófia Baranyi (HUN)
Zsófia Baranyi (HUN)	5–0	Marta Ossipova (EST)
Kokoro Sakaji (JPN)	1–0	Ivana Perović (SRB)

==== Pool B ====
Rank	Athlete	B	W	D	L	Pts	Score
1	Anna Chernysheva (RUS)	3	3	0	0	6	20–0
2	Mobina Heidari (IRI)	3	2	0	1	4	3–8
3	Assia Oukhattou (FRA)	3	1	0	2	2	4–9
4	Charlotte Hope (GBR)	3	0	0	3	0	0–10

	Score	
Charlotte Hope (GBR)	0–2	Mobina Heidari (IRI)
Assia Oukhattou (FRA)	0–8	Anna Chernysheva (RUS)
Assia Oukhattou (FRA)	0–1	Mobina Heidari (IRI)
Charlotte Hope (GBR)	0–4	Anna Chernysheva (RUS)
Anna Chernysheva (RUS)	8–0	Mobina Heidari (IRI)
Charlotte Hope (GBR)	0–4	Assia Oukhattou (FRA)

=== Semifinals ===
	Score	
Kokoro Sakaji (JPN)	0–0	Mobina Heidari (IRI)
Anna Chernysheva (RUS)	0–0	Ivana Perović (SRB)

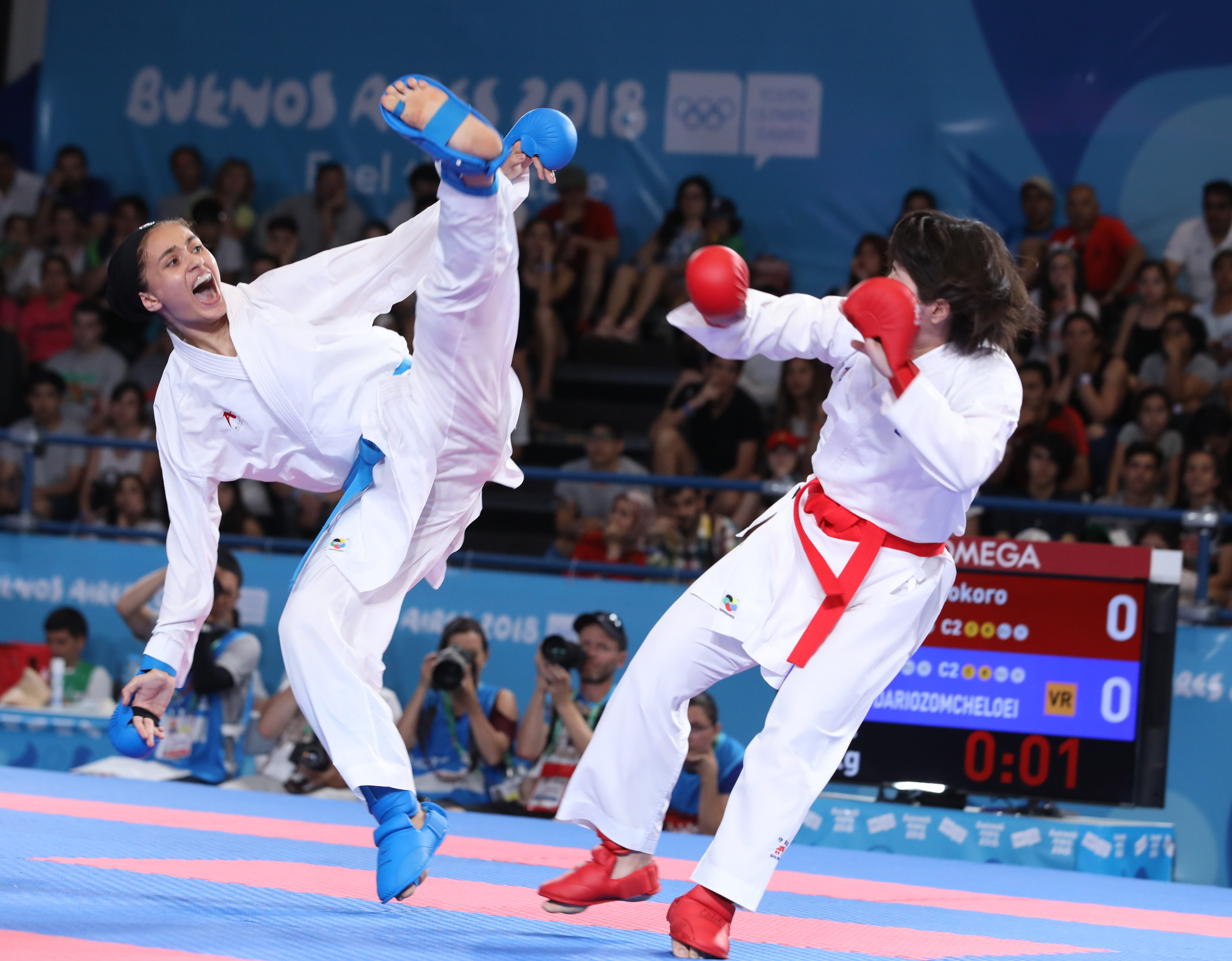
Mobina Heidari vs. Kokoro Sakaji

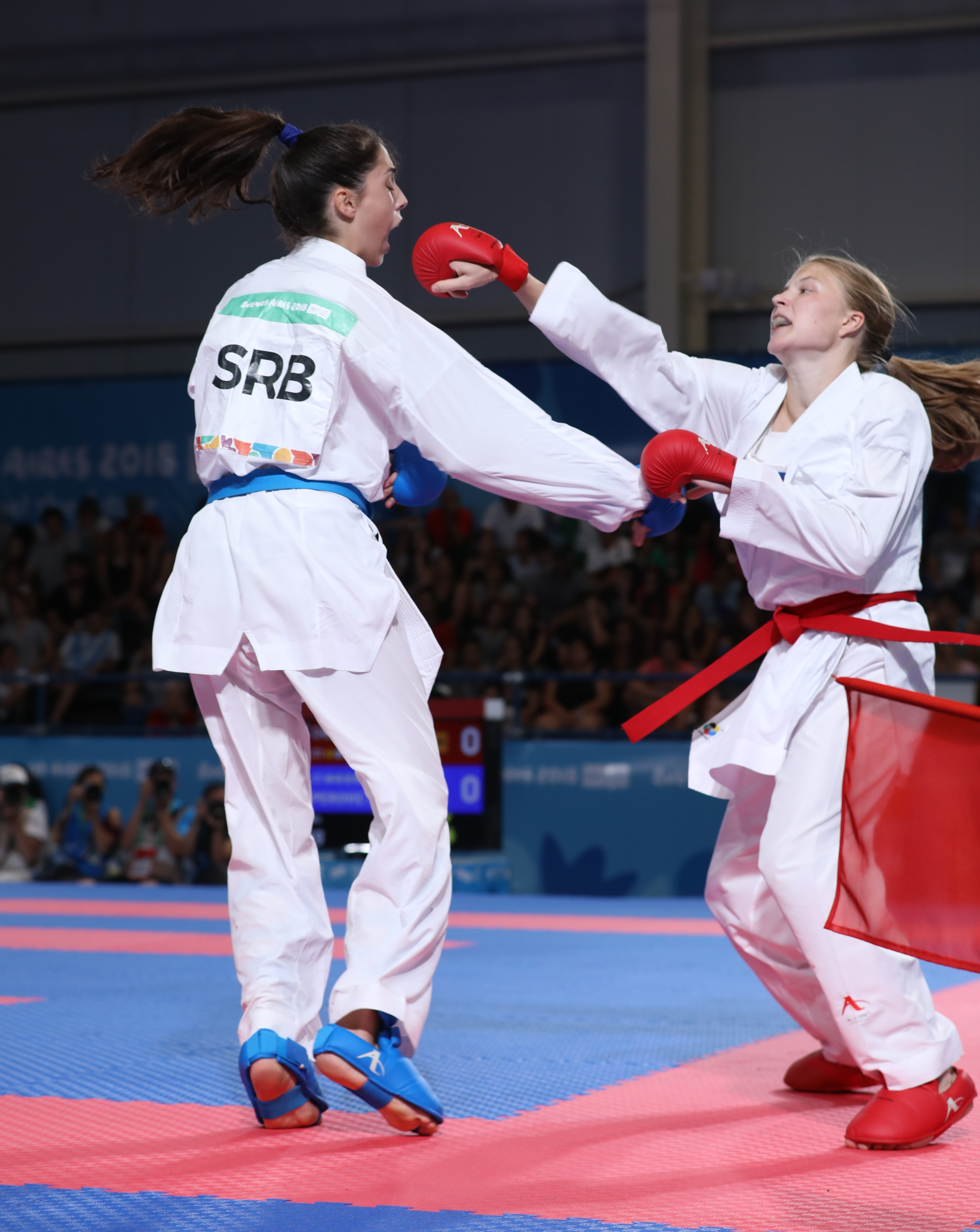
Ivana Perović vs. Anna Chernysheva

=== Final ===
	Score	
Kokoro Sakaji (JPN)	3–0	Anna Chernysheva (RUS)

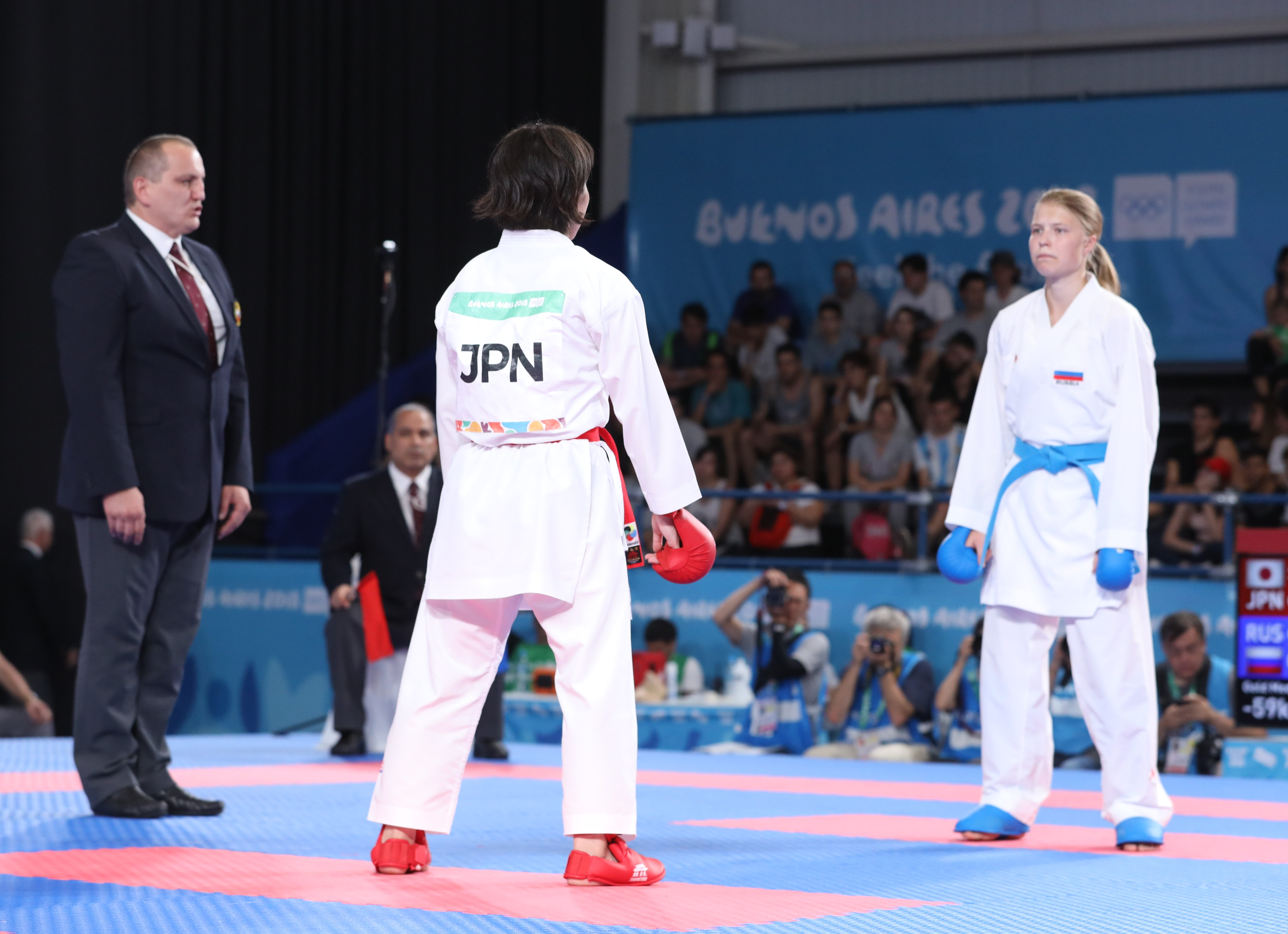
Begin of the fight between Kokoro Sakaji and Anna Chernysheva

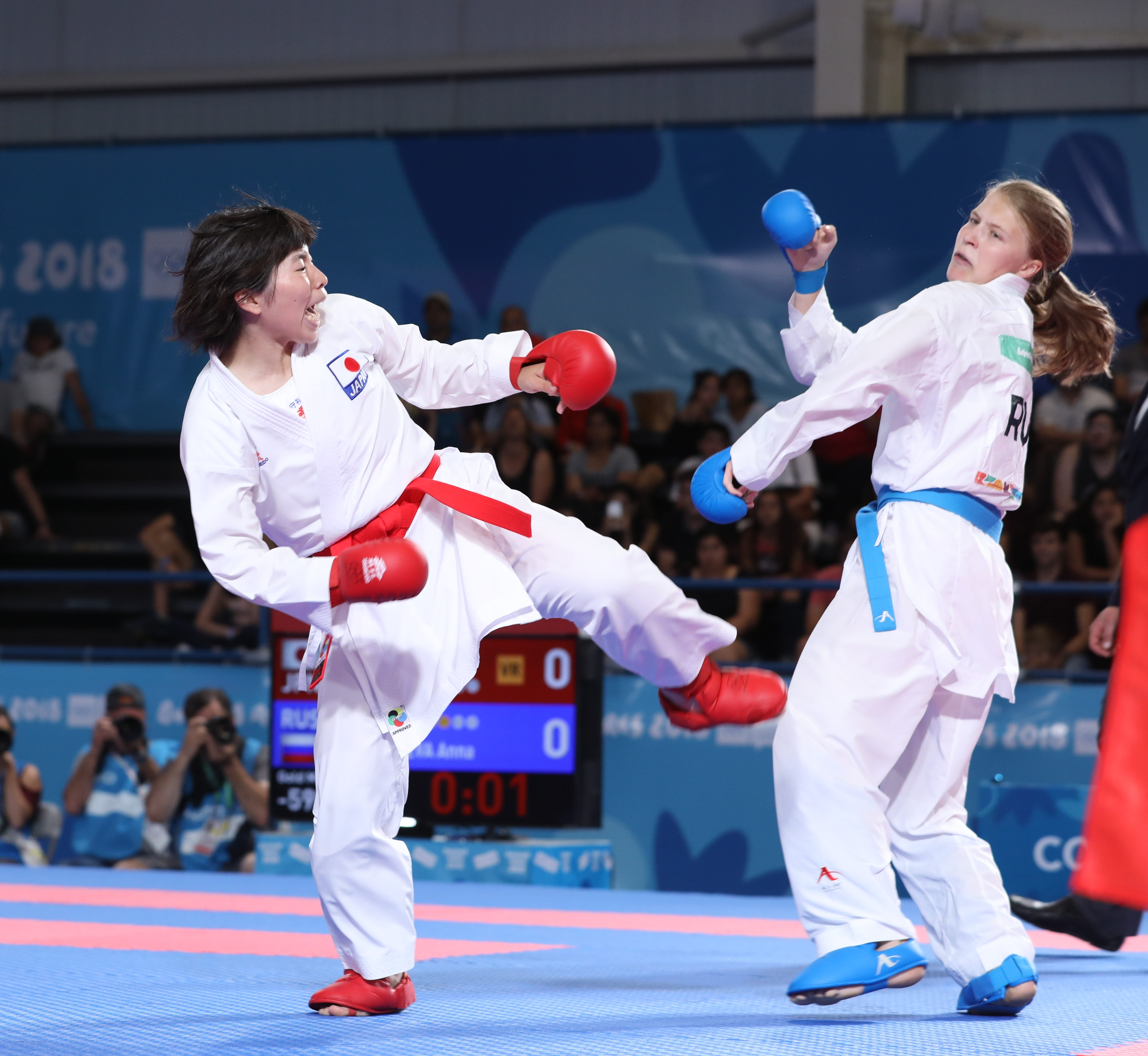
Kokoro Sakaji attacks Anna Chernysheva during the fight

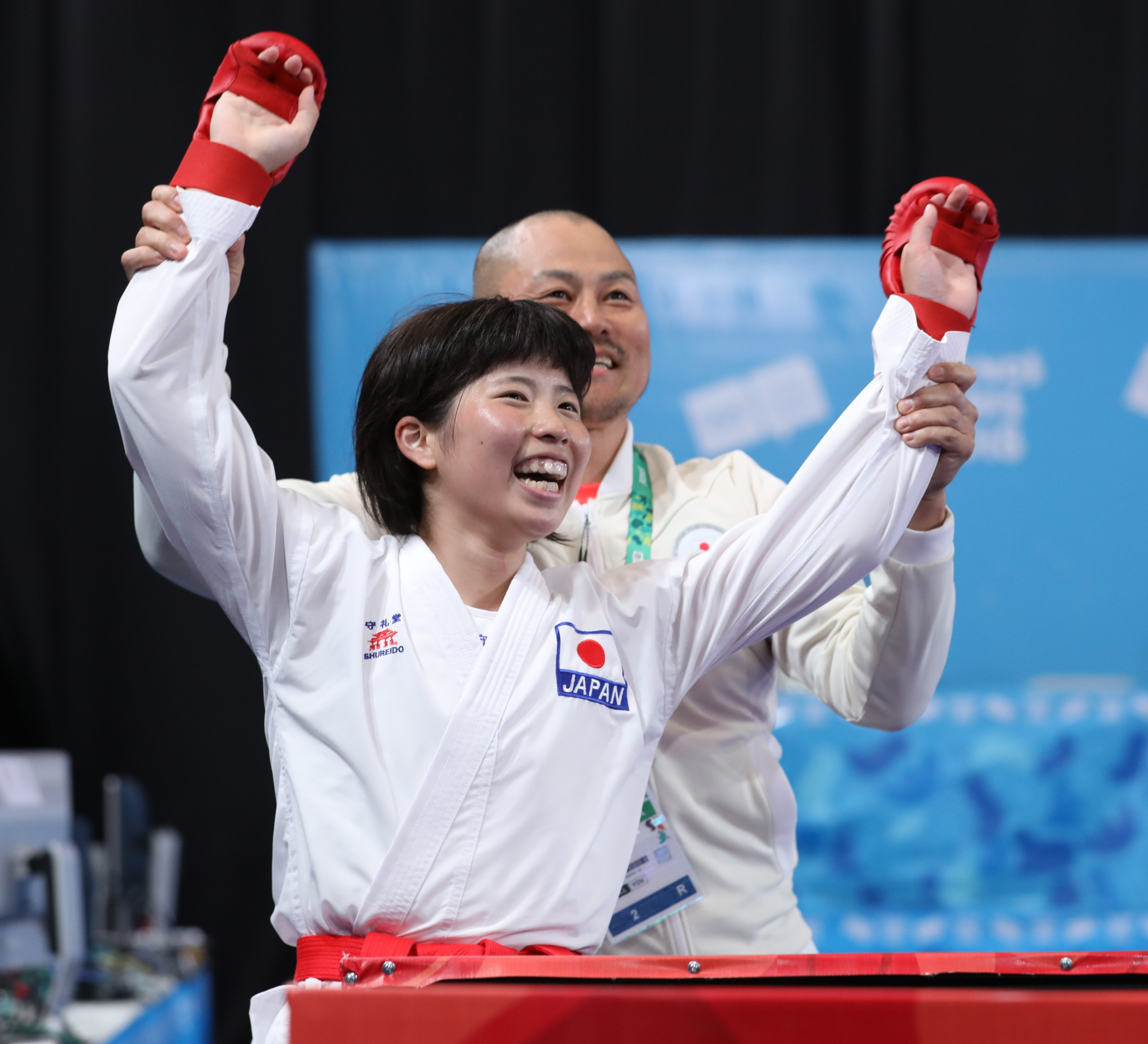
Kokoro Sakaji celebrating the victory with her trainer

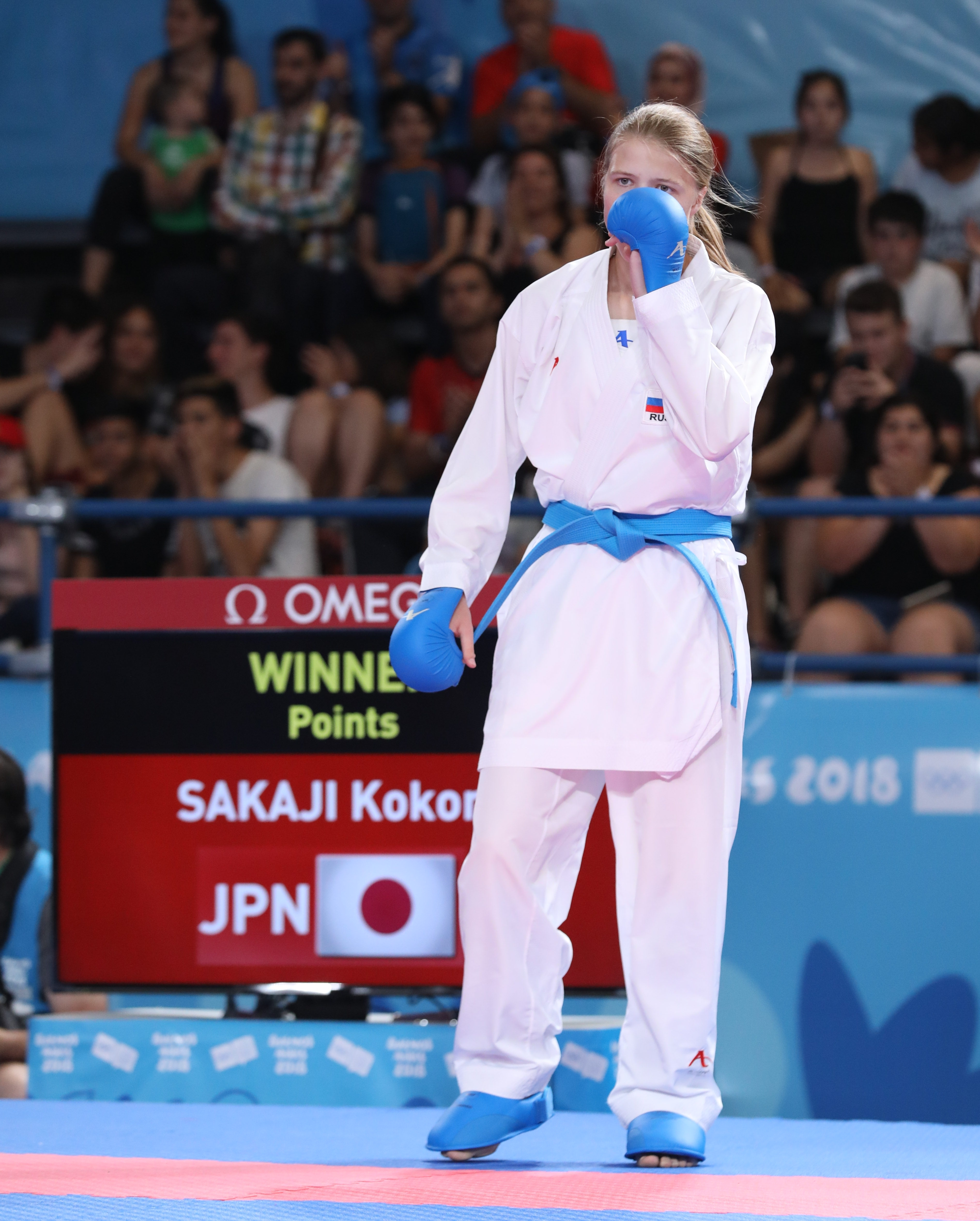
Anna Chernysheva disappointed after losing the fight
