= Hungary at the 2018 Summer Youth Olympics =

- IOC code: HUN
- NOC: Hungarian Olympic Committee
- Website: http://www.olimpia.hu/

in Buenos Aires, Argentina 6 – 18 October 2018
- Competitors: 79
- Medals Ranked 4th: Gold 12 Silver 7 Bronze 5 Total 24

Summer Youth Olympics appearances (overview)
- 2010; 2014; 2018

Hungary participated at the 2018 Summer Youth Olympics in Buenos Aires, Argentina from 6 October to 18 October 2018.

== Medalists ==
Medals awarded to participants of mixed-NOC (combined) teams are represented in italics. These medals are not counted towards the individual NOC medal tally.

Medal	Name	Sport	Event	Date
Gold	Kristóf Milák	Swimming	Boys' 400 m freestyle	7 October
Gold	Krisztián Rabb	Fencing	Boys' sabre	7 October
Gold	Kristóf Milák	Swimming	Boys' 200 m freestyle	8 October
Gold	Blanka Berecz	Swimming	Girls' 200 m butterfly	8 October
Gold	Szofi Özbas	Judo	Girls' 63 kg	8 October
Gold	Liza Pusztai	Fencing	Girls' sabre	9 October
Gold	Ajna Késely	Swimming	Girls' 800 m freestyle	9 October
Gold	Krisztián Balázs	Gymnastics	Mixed multi-discipline team (in mixed-NOC team with Team Simone Biles)	10 October
Gold	Ajna Késely	Swimming	Girls' 200 m freestyle	10 October
Gold	Liza Pusztai; Krisztián Rabb	Fencing	Mixed team (in mixed-NOC team with Team Europe 1)	10 October
Gold	Zalán Pekler	Shooting	Mixed 10 metre air rifle (in mixed-NOC team with MGL)	11 October
Gold	Eszter Rendessy	Canoeing	Girls' K1 sprint	12 October
Gold	Kristóf Milák	Swimming	Boys' 200 m butterfly	12 October
Gold	Ajna Késely	Swimming	Girls' 400 m freestyle	12 October
Gold	Ádám Kiss	Canoeing	Boys' K1 sprint	13 October
Silver	Vince Jármy	Equestrian	Team Jumping (in mixed-NOC team with Team Europe)	9 October
Silver	Kristóf Milák	Swimming	Boys' 100 m butterfly	9 October
Silver	Laura Gönczöl	Canoeing	Girls' C1 sprint	13 October
Silver	Krisztián Balázs	Gymnastics	Boys' floor	13 October
Silver	Anna Szél	Wrestling	Girls' freestyle 57 kg	13 October
Silver	Csenge Bácskay	Gymnastics	Girls' vault	13 October
Silver	Klaudia Endrész	Athletics	Girls' long jump	14 October
Silver	Dániel Huller	Athletics	Boys' 400 metre hurdles	16 October
Bronze	Zsombor Vég	Judo	Boys' 100 kg	9 October
Bronze	Rebeka Benzsay; Csenge Braun; Dorottya Gajdos; Gréta Hadfi; Réka Király; Gabriella Landi; Sára Léránt; Dalma Mátéfi; Klaudia Pintér	Beach handball	Girls' tournament	13 October
Bronze	Michelle Gulyás	Modern pentathlon	Girls' individual	13 October
Bronze	Krisztián Balázs	Gymnastics	Boys' horizontal bar	15 October
Bronze	Virág Buzsáki; Kata Blanka Vas	Cycling	Girls' combined team	17 October

== Badminton ==
Hungary qualified two players based on the Badminton Junior World Rankings.

Singles

Athlete	Event	Group stage				Quarterfinal	Semifinal	Final / BM	Rank
Athlete	Event	Opposition Score	Opposition Score	Opposition Score	Rank	Opposition Score	Opposition Score	Opposition Score	Rank
Balázs Pápai	Boys' Singles	Chen (TPE); L 0–2	Guo (NZL); L 0–2	Grimley (GBR); L 0–2	4	did not advance			9
Vivien Sándorházi	Girls' Singles	Gynga (MDA); W 2–0	Polanc (SLO); W 2–0	—	1Q	Chaiwan (THA); L 0–2	did not advance		5

Team

Athlete	Event	Group stage				Quarterfinal	Semifinal	Final / BM	Rank
Athlete	Event	Opposition Score	Opposition Score	Opposition Score	Rank	Opposition Score	Opposition Score	Opposition Score	Rank
Team Delta; Balázs Pápai (HUN); Mateo Delmastro (ARG); Arnaud Merklé (FRA); Dmitriy Panarin (KAZ); Elena Andreu (ESP); Pattarasuda Chaiwan (THA); Madouc Linders (NED); Petra Polanc (SLO)	Mixed Teams	Zeta (MIX); W (110–95)	Alpha (MIX); W (110–99)	Epsilon (MIX); L (108–110)	1Q	Theta (MIX); L (93–110)	did not advance		5
Team Zeta; Vivien Sándorházi (HUN); Danylo Bosniuk (UKR); Christopher Grimley (GBR); Kettiya Keoxay (LAO); Nhat Nguyen (IRL); Maharani Sekar Batari (INA); Jaslyn Hooi (SGP); Nairoby Abigail Jiménez (DOM)	Mixed Teams	Delta (MIX); L (95–110)	Epsilon (MIX); W (110–89)	Alpha (MIX); L (103–110)	3Q	Sigma (MIX); W (110–106)	Omega (MIX); L (109–110)	Theta (MIX); L (107–110)	4

== Basketball ==
Hungary qualified a girls' team based on the U18 3x3 National Federation Ranking.

- Girls' tournament – 1 team of 4 athletes

Event	Group stage					Quarterfinal	Semifinal	Final / BM
Event	Opposition Score	Opposition Score	Opposition Score	Opposition Score	Rank	Opposition Score	Opposition Score	Opposition Score
Girls' tournament	China; W 21-13	Germany; W 20-9	Romania; W 21-10	Iran; W 22-0	1	France; L 12-13	did not advance	

Shoot-out contest

Athlete	Event	Qualification		Final					
Athlete	Event	Points	Rank	Round 1	Round 2	Round 3	Round 4	Total	Rank
Aliz Varga	Shoot-out contest	5	6	did not advance					
Orsolya Toth	Shoot-out contest	5	10	did not advance					

== Boxing ==
Girls

Athlete	Event	Preliminaries	Semifinals	Final / RM	Rank
Athlete	Event	Opposition Result	Opposition Result	Opposition Result	Rank
Luca Anna Hámori	-60 kg	Saputo (ARG); L 0–5	did not advance		5

== Canoeing ==
Hungary qualified four boats based on its performance at the 2018 World Qualification Event.

- Boys' C1 – 1 boat
- Boys' K1 – 1 boat
- Girls' C1 – 1 boat
- Girls' K1 – 1 boat

Athlete	Event	Qualification		Repechage		Last 16	Quarterfinals	Semifinals	Final / BM	Rank
Athlete	Event	Time	Rank	Time	Rank	Opposition Result	Opposition Result	Opposition Result	Opposition Result	Rank
Balázs Palla	Boys' C1 sprint	1:54.17	4	Bye		—	do Nascimento (BRA); W 1:55.48	Bakhraddin (KAZ); L 1:57.04	Minařík (CZE); L 1:56.32	4
Balázs Palla	Boys' C1 slalom	1:28.48	8	1:27.40	3	—	Kuzyk (UKR); L 1:29.05	did not advance		
Ádám Kiss	Boys' K1 sprint	1:43.36	5	1:41.49	1	—	Hradil (CZE); W 1:42.91	Rossi (ARG); W 1:38.49	Vangeel (BEL); W 1:38.770	1st place, gold medalist(s)
Ádám Kiss	Boys' K1 slalom	1:17.79	10	1:15.98	3	—	Snook (NZL); L 1:15.37	did not advance		
Laura Gonczol	Girls' C1 sprint	2:17.17	3	Bye		Amusar (NGR); W 2:14.85	Palamarchuk (UKR); W 2:11.24	Guzmán (MEX); W 2:15.02	Fayzieva (UZB); L 2:16.14	2nd place, silver medalist(s)
Laura Gonczol	Girls' C1 slalom	1:38.68	9	1:37.13	2	Asadbeki (IRI); L 1:36.57	did not advance			
Eszter Rendessy	Girls' K1 sprint	1:48.68	1	Bye		Donias (MEX); W 1:50.33	Charayron (FRA); W 1:49.91	Sukhanova (KAZ); W 1:49.13	Pecsuková (SVK); W 1:46.21	1st place, gold medalist(s)
Eszter Rendessy	Girls' K1 slalom	1:25.78	12	1:27.48	3	Tzu-hsuan (TPE); L 1:23.03	did not advance			

== Cycling ==
Hungary qualified a boys' and girls' combined team based on its ranking in the Youth Olympic Games Junior Nation Rankings.

- Boys' combined team – 1 team of 2 athletes
- Girls' combined team – 1 team of 2 athletes

Athlete	Event	Team time trial			Road race			XC eliminator		XC short circuit			Criterium				Total	
Athlete	Event	Time	Rank	Points	Time	Rank	Points	Rank	Points	Time	Rank	Points	Laps	Sprint pts	Rank	Points	Points	Rank
Erik Fetter	Boys' combined team	9:00.91	13	4	1:31:03	4	30	5	40	19:33	1	100	16	0	32	0	174	5
Adam Fulop	Boys' combined team	9:00.91	13	4	1:31:08	31	0	3	0	17:21	12	0	4	0	—	0	174	5
Kata Blanka Vas	Girls' combined team	9:50.04	50	4	1:42:19	5	40	DNF		18:44	7	25	16	11	1	100	255	3rd place, bronze medalist(s)
Virág Buzsáki	Girls' combined team	9:50.04	50	4	1:42:19	18	0	5	40	20:09	19	0	16	0	29	0	255	3rd place, bronze medalist(s)

== Dancesport ==
Hungary qualified one dancer based on its performance at the 2018 World Youth Breaking Championship.

- B-Girls – Csepke

== Equestrian ==
Hungary qualified a rider based on its performance at the FEI European Junior Jumping Championships.

- Individual Jumping – 1 athlete

Athlete	Horse	Event	Round 1		Round 2			Total		Jump off		
Athlete	Horse	Event	Penalties	Rank	Penalties	Total	Rank	Penalties	Rank	Penalties	Total	Rank
Vince Jármy	Walterstown Cruise Z	Individual Jumping	0	1	0	8	12	8	12	did not advance		12
Europe; Jack Whitaker (GBR); Giacomo Casadei (ITA); Vince Jármy (HUN); Rowen van de Mheen (NED); Simon Jan Morssinkhof (BEL)	L V Chance Luck; Darna Z Walterstown Cruise Z Baral Ourika; Cheptel Wigan	Team Jumping	0; 0; 4 # 0; 0 #	0	4 # 0; 0; 0; 4 #	0	0	4 # 0 # 0; 0; 0	0	38.31 # 37.85 # 34.99; 34.79; 31.80	101.58	2nd place, silver medalist(s)

== Fencing ==
Hungary qualified four athletes based on its performance at the 2018 Cadet World Championship.

- Boys' Sabre – Krisztian Rabb
- Girls' Épée – Kinga Dekany
- Girls' Foil – Karolina Zsoldosi
- Girls' Sabre – Liza Pusztai

== Gymnastics ==
=== Artistic ===
Hungary qualified two gymnasts based on its performance at the 2018 European Junior Championship.

- Boys' artistic individual all-around – 1 quota
- Girls' artistic individual all-around – 1 quota

Boys

Athlete	Event	Apparatus						Total	Rank
Athlete	Event	F	PH	R	V	PB	HB	Total	Rank
Krisztián Balázs	Qualification	13.533	12.533	12.833	12.666	13.400	13.366	78.331	9
Krisztián Balázs	All-around	12.333	12.733	12.733	11.400	10.475	13.233	72.907	16
Krisztián Balázs	Floor	13.600	—					13.600	2nd place, silver medalist(s)
Krisztián Balázs	Pommel horse	—	12.533	—				12.533	11
Krisztián Balázs	Rings	—			12.833	—		12.833	11
Krisztián Balázs	Parallel bars	—				13.033	—	13.033	7
Krisztián Balázs	Horizontal bar	—				13.233	—	13.233	3rd place, bronze medalist(s)

Girls

Athlete	Event	Apparatus				Total	Rank
Athlete	Event	V	UB	BB	F	Total	Rank
Csenge Bácskay	Qualification	13.566	10.433	12.033	12.366	48.398	10
Csenge Bácskay	All-around	13.500	12.133	11.100	12.033	48.766	14
Csenge Bácskay	Vault	13.483	—			13.483	3rd place, bronze medalist(s)
Csenge Bácskay	Uneven Bars	—					
Csenge Bácskay	Balance beam	—					
Csenge Bácskay	Floor	—					

=== Multidiscipline ===
Team	Athlete	Acrobatic	Artistic	Rhythmic	Trampoline	Total points	Rank
Team Simone Biles (Orange)	Mariela Kostadinova (BUL); Panayot Dimitrov (BUL)	10	—			293	1st place, gold medalist(s)
Team Simone Biles (Orange)	Ruan Lange (RSA)	—	17	—		293	1st place, gold medalist(s)
Team Simone Biles (Orange)	Krisztián Balázs (HUN)	—	34	—		293	1st place, gold medalist(s)
Team Simone Biles (Orange)	Nazar Chepurnyi (UKR)	—	70	—		293	1st place, gold medalist(s)
Team Simone Biles (Orange)	Tamara Ong (SGP)	—	38	—		293	1st place, gold medalist(s)
Team Simone Biles (Orange)	Phạm Như Phương (VIE)	—	48	—		293	1st place, gold medalist(s)
Team Simone Biles (Orange)	Alba Petisco (ESP)	—	40	—		293	1st place, gold medalist(s)
Team Simone Biles (Orange)	Talisa Torretti (ITA)	—		13	—	293	1st place, gold medalist(s)
Team Simone Biles (Orange)	Daria Trubnikova (RUS)	—		4	—	293	1st place, gold medalist(s)
Team Simone Biles (Orange)	Yelyzaveta Luzan (AZE)	—		–	—	293	1st place, gold medalist(s)
Team Simone Biles (Orange)	Liam Christie (AUS)	—			17	293	1st place, gold medalist(s)
Team Simone Biles (Orange)	Fan Xiny (CHN)	—			2	293	1st place, gold medalist(s)
Team Kohei Uchimura (Blue)	Daryna Plokhotniuk (UKR); Oleksandr Madei (UKR)	10	—			407	8
Team Kohei Uchimura (Blue)	Abdulaziz Mirvaliev (UZB)	—	115	—		407	8
Team Kohei Uchimura (Blue)	Michael Torres (PUR)	—	117	—		407	8
Team Kohei Uchimura (Blue)	Ondřej Kalný (CZE)	—	–	—		407	8
Team Kohei Uchimura (Blue)	Amelie Morgan (GBR)	—	20	—		407	8
Team Kohei Uchimura (Blue)	Tang Xijing (CHN)	—	9	—		407	8
Team Kohei Uchimura (Blue)	Csenge Bácskay (HUN)	—	5	—		407	8
Team Kohei Uchimura (Blue)	Josephine Juul Møller (NOR)	—		34	—	407	8
Team Kohei Uchimura (Blue)	Denisa Stoian (ROU)	—		47	—	407	8
Team Kohei Uchimura (Blue)	Anna Kamenshchikova (BLR)	—		22	—	407	8
Team Kohei Uchimura (Blue)	Noureddine-Younes Belkhir (ALG)	—			21	407	8
Team Kohei Uchimura (Blue)	Emily Mussmann (SUI)	—			7	407	8

== Judo ==
Individual

Athlete	Event	Round of 16	Quarterfinals	Semifinals	Rep 1	Rep 2	Rep 3	Final / BM	Rank
Athlete	Event	Opposition Result	Opposition Result	Opposition Result	Opposition Result	Opposition Result	Opposition Result	Opposition Result	Rank
Zsombor Vég	Boys' 100 kg	Bye	Alin Bagrin (MDA); W 10-00	Bekarys Saduakas (KAZ); L 00s2-01s1	Bye			Rok Pogorevc (SLO); W 10-00	3rd place, bronze medalist(s)
Szofi Özbas	Girls' 63 kg	Rachel Krapman (CAN); W 11-00s1	Marin Visser (NED); W 10-00	Alessia Corrao (BEL); W 01s1-00	Bye			Mariem Khlifi (TUN); W 10s1-00s2	1st place, gold medalist(s)

Team

Athletes	Event	Round of 16	Quarterfinals	Semifinals	Final	
Athletes	Event	Opposition Result	Opposition Result	Opposition Result	Opposition Result	Rank
Team Moscow; Augusta Ambourouet (GAB); Alessia Corrao (BEL); Temuujin Ganburged (MGL); Alexis Harrison Ayarza (PAN); Hamza Jashari (MKD); Paulina Țurcan (MDA); Zsombor Vég (HUN)	Mixed team	Team Singapore (MIX); W 4–3	Team London (MIX); L 3–4	did not advance		
Team Montreal; Houda Faissal Abdourahman (DJI); Nemesis Candelo (PAN); Szofi Ozbas (HUN); Ester Svobodova (CZE); Oleh Veredyba (UKR); Kimy Bravo Blanco (CUB); Rhys Allan (AUS); Julian Gutierrez (MEX)	Mixed team	Team Beijing (MIX); L 2–5	did not advance			

== Karate ==
Hungary qualified one athlete based on its performance at one of the Karate Qualification Tournaments.

- Girls' −59kg – Zsófia Baranyi

Athlete	Event	Group Stage				Semifinal	Final / BM	
Athlete	Event	Opposition Score	Opposition Score	Opposition Score	Rank	Opposition Score	Opposition Score	Rank
Zsófia Baranyi	Girls' 59 kg	Marta Ossipova (EST); W (5–0)	Kokoro Sakaji (JPN); L (0–1)	Ivana Perović (SRB); L (0–2)	3	did not advance		

== Modern pentathlon ==
Hungary qualified one pentathlete based on its performance at the European Youth Olympic Games Qualifier. Hungary also qualified a male athlete based on its performance at the 2018 Youth A World Championship.

- Boys' Individual – Jozsef Tamas
- Girls' Individual – Michelle Gulyas

== Shooting ==
Hungary qualified one sport shooter based on its performance at the 2017 European Championships.

Athlete	Event	Qualification		Final	
Athlete	Event	Points	Rank	Points	Rank
Zalán Pekler	Boys' 10 metre air rifle	620.0	9	did not advance	

Team

Athletes	Event	Qualification		Round of 16	Quarterfinals	Semifinals	Final / BM	Rank
Athletes	Event	Points	Rank	Opposition Result	Opposition Result	Opposition Result	Opposition Result	Rank
Zalán Pekler (HUN); Enkhmaa Erdenechuluun (MGL)	Mixed Team 10m Air Rifle	828.4	!Q	Hamid (BAN); Zhang (CHN); W 10–7	Volkart (ARG); Zolfagharian (IRI); W 10–9	Kemppi (FIN); Firmapaz (ARG); W 10–5	Dereviagina (RUS); Ramírez Ramos (MEX); W 10–9	1st place, gold medalist(s)

== Triathlon ==
Hungary qualified two athletes based on its performance at the 2018 European Youth Olympic Games Qualifier.

Individual

Athlete	Event	Swim (750m)	Trans 1	Bike (20 km)	Trans 2	Run (5 km)	Total Time	Rank
Gergely Kiss	Boys	9:31	0:32	28:47	0:29	16:39	55:58	13
Nikolett Ferenczi	Girls	10:44	1:03	30:51	0:29	18:18	1:01:25	13

Relay

Athlete	Event	Total Times per Athlete (Swim 250m, Bike 6.6 km, Run 1.8 km)	Total Group Time	Rank
Europe 4 Hanne Peeters (BEL); Gergely Kiss (HUN); Nikolett Ferenczi (HUN); Calum Young (GBR)	Mixed Relay	23:01 (9); 21:00 (4); 23:42 (5); 21:38 (5)	1:29:21	4

== Weightlifting ==
Boy

Athlete	Event	Snatch		Clean & Jerk		Total	Rank
Athlete	Event	Result	Rank	Result	Rank	Total	Rank
Richard Orsos	−62 kg	95	9	116	10	211	10

Girl

Athlete	Event	Snatch		Clean & jerk		Total	Rank
Athlete	Event	Result	Rank	Result	Rank	Total	Rank
Cintia Andrea Arva	−53 kg	69	4	88	4	157	4

== Wrestling ==
Legend

- F — Won by fall
- Qualification Legend: Q=Final A (Gold medal match); qB=Final B (Bronze medal match); qC=Final C (5th Placement match); qD=Final D (7th Placement match); qE=Final E (9th Placement match)

Girls' Freestyle

Athlete	Event	Group Stages		Final / BM / Pl.	
Athlete	Event	Opposition Score	Standing	Opposition Score	Rank
Róza Szenttamási	49 kg	Group B Ech-chabki (MAR): L 4–8; Sim (CAM): W 4–0^{F} Duenas (GUM): W 6–0^{F} Malmgren (SWE): L 0–6^{F}	3 qC	Ikei (USA); W 3–0	5
Anna Szél	57 kg	Group A Toida (CMR): W 8–2^{F} Mansi (IND): W 6–0; Parra (VEN): W 10–0; Ringaci (MDA): W 2–0^{F}	1 Q	Ozaki (JPN); L 0–10	2nd place, silver medalist(s)
