= Miku Kojima =

Japanese football player

Personal information
- Birth name: Miku Ito
- Date of birth: 6 November 1999 (age 27)
- Place of birth: Tokyo, Japan
- Height: 1.64 m (5 ft 5 in)
- Position: Midfielder

Team information
- Current team: Granada CF
- Number: 14

Senior career*
Years	Team	Apps	(Gls)
2019–2023	Alavés	69	(6)
2023–2024	Sporting de Huelva	29	(4)
2024–	Granada CF	62	(1)
- * Club domestic league appearances and goals as of 18:51, 16 November 2026 (UTC)

Miku Kojima (née Ito; born 11 November 1999) is a Japanese professional footballer who plays as a midfielder for Liga F club Granada CF. She also played for Alavés Gloriosas and Sporting de Huelva.
