= Venezuela at the 2018 Summer Youth Olympics =

- IOC code: VEN
- NOC: Venezuelan Olympic Committee
- Website: covoficial.com.ve

in Buenos Aires
- Competitors: 53 in 17 sports
- Flag bearer: Katherin Echandia
- Medals Ranked 39th: Gold 2 Silver 0 Bronze 0 Total 2

Summer Youth Olympics appearances (overview)
- 2010; 2014; 2018; 2026

Venezuela competed at the 2018 Summer Youth Olympics, in Buenos Aires, Argentina, from 6 to 18 October 2018.

== Medalists ==
Medal	Name	Sport	Event	Date
Gold	Katherin Echandía	Weightlifting	Women's Girls's 44 kg	7 October
Gold	María Gimenez	Judo	Girls's –44kg	7 October

== Basketball 3×3 ==
Venezuela qualified both teams (8 athletes) via World Ranking as of April 1, 2018 (1st in Boys; 4th in Girls). This is a 2nd qualification in a row for a Venezuelan 3x3 (also qualified in Nanjing 2014 both teams). This is not consider as Team Sport (all athletes have individual World Ranking).

3x3 tournament

Event	Group stage					Quarterfinal	Semifinal	Final / BM	
Event	Opposition Score	Opposition Score	Opposition Score	Opposition Score	Rank	Opposition Score	Opposition Score	Opposition Score	Rank
Boys' tournament	Andorra; W 22–10	Ukraine; L 16–22	New Zealand; L 15–21	Brazil; L 9–21	4	did not advance			14
Girls' tournament	United States; L 9–21	Sri Lanka; W 21–10	Egypt; L 15–16	Ukraine; L 11–22	3	did not advance			

Dunk contest

Athlete	Event	Qualification				Semifinal				Final				
Athlete	Event	Round 1	Round 2	Total	Rank	Round 1	Round 2	Total	Rank	Round 1	Round 2	Round 3	Total	Rank
Omar Márquez	Dunk contest	DNS				did not advance								

Shoot-out contest

Athlete	Event	Qualification		Final					
Athlete	Event	Points	Rank	Round 1	Round 2	Round 3	Round 4	Total	Rank
Luisanny Zapata	Shoot-out contest	4	17	did not advance					
Odeth Betancourt	Shoot-out contest	3	25	did not advance					

== Beach handball ==
Venezuela qualified Boys' Team and Girls' Team (18 athletes) to the tournament.

== Beach volleyball ==
Venezuela qualified girls' and boys' from their performance at the 2018 CSV Youth Beach volleyball Tour.

Athletes	Event	Preliminary round		Round of 24	Round of 16	Quarterfinals	Semifinals	Final / BM	
Athletes	Event	Opposition Score	Rank	Opposition Score	Opposition Score	Opposition Score	Opposition Score	Opposition Score	Rank
Richard Brizuela; Gabriel González	Boys'	Bintang–Danang (INA); L 0-2; Brewster–Schwengel (USA); L 0-2; Railbiently–Brian (ARU); W 2-0	3	A Lezcano–C Lobo (CRC); L 0-2	Did not advance				
Urimar Narváez; Diana Ramírez	Girls'	Romero–Gutiérrez (MEX); W 2-1; Mali–Kayla (ARU); W 2-0; Valentine–Penelope (RWA); W 2-0	1	Bye	Thatsarida–Pawarun (THA); L 1-2	Did not advance			

== Boxing ==
Boys

Athlete	Event	Preliminary R1	Preliminary R2	Semifinals	Final / RM	Rank
Athlete	Event	Opposition Result	Opposition Result	Opposition Result	Opposition Result	Rank
Giodanny Jiménez	-75 kg	Poutoa (SAM); L 0–5	Douibi (ALG); L 0–5	Did not advance	Millas (ITA); W WO	5

== Cycling ==
Venezuela qualified one athlete in BMX freestyle based on its performance at the 2018 Urban Cycling World Championship.

- Mixed BMX freestyle - 1 girl

== Equestrian ==
Venezuela qualified a rider based on its ranking in the FEI World Jumping Challenge Rankings.

Athlete	Horse	Event	Round 1		Round 2			Total		Jump-Off		Rank
Athlete	Horse	Event	Penalties	Rank	Penalties	Total	Rank	Penalties	Rank	Penalties	Time	Rank
Bernardo Lander	Roi Quake Z	Individual Jumping	EL		Did not advance							29
South America; Philip Mattos Botelho (BRA); Bernardo Lander (VEN); Gonzalo Bedoya (BOL); Agostina Llano Zuccolillo (PAR); Richard Kierkegaard (ARG)	Denise Z Roi Quake Z Ankara I Red Sugar Z Legolas I	Team Jumping	12 # 4; 4 # 0; 0	4	0; 4 # 0; 0; 0	0	4	Did not advance				4

== Fencing ==
Venezuela qualified one athlete based on its performance at the 2018 Cadet World Championship.

- Girls' Foil - Anabella Acurero Gonzalez

== Gymnastics ==
=== Artistic ===
Venezuela qualified one gymnast based on its performance at the 2018 American Junior Championship.

- Boys' artistic individual all-around - 1 quota

=== Multidiscipline ===
Team	Athlete	Acrobatic	Artistic	Rhythmic	Trampoline	Total points	Rank
Yevgeny Marchenko (Brown)	Daniela González (PUR); Adriel González (PUR)	36	—N/a			430	10
Yevgeny Marchenko (Brown)	Byun Seong-won (KOR)	—N/a	45	—N/a		430	10
Yevgeny Marchenko (Brown)	Lay Giannini (ITA)	—N/a	55	—N/a		430	10
Yevgeny Marchenko (Brown)	Víctor Betancourt (VEN)	—N/a	54	—N/a		430	10
Yevgeny Marchenko (Brown)	Kate Sayer (AUS)	—N/a	36	—N/a		430	10
Yevgeny Marchenko (Brown)	Elvira Katsali (GRE)	—N/a	89	—N/a		430	10
Yevgeny Marchenko (Brown)	Valeriia Sotskova (ISR)	—N/a		26	—N/a	430	10
Yevgeny Marchenko (Brown)	Anastasia Pingou (CYP)	—N/a		20	—N/a	430	10
Yevgeny Marchenko (Brown)	Ekaterina Fetisova (UZB)	—N/a		39	—N/a	430	10
Yevgeny Marchenko (Brown)	Fu Fantao (CHN)	—N/a			8	430	10
Yevgeny Marchenko (Brown)	Alyssa Oh (USA)	—N/a			12	430	10

== Judo ==
Individual

Athlete	Event	Round of 16	Quarterfinals	Semifinals	Rep 1	Rep 2	Rep 3	Final / BM	Rank
Athlete	Event	Opposition Result	Opposition Result	Opposition Result	Opposition Result	Opposition Result	Opposition Result	Opposition Result	Rank
Carlos Páez	Boys' 81 kg	Bye	Martin Bezděk (CZE); L 00-10	did not advance	—N/a	Ahmed Mohamed Fahmy (EGY); W 10s1-00s1	Keagan Young (CAN); L 00s1-01s2	did not advance	
María Giménez	Girls' 44 kg	Bye	Mikaela Rojas (ARG); W 10-00s2	Anastasia Balaban (UKR); W 10-00	Bye			Tababi Devi Thangjam (IND); W 11-00s1	1st place, gold medalist(s)

Team

Athletes	Event	Round of 16	Quarterfinals	Semifinals	Final	
Athletes	Event	Opposition Result	Opposition Result	Opposition Result	Opposition Result	Rank
Team Beijing; Artsiom Kolasau (BLR); Liu Li-ling (TPE); Jaykhunbek Nazarov (UZB); Carlos Páez (VEN); Itzel Pecha (MEX); Ana Viktorija Puljiz (CRO); Veronica Toniolo (ITA)	Mixed team	Team Montreal (MIX); W 5–2	Team Nanjing (MIX); W 4–3	Team London (MIX); W 7–0	Team Athens (MIX); W 4–3	1st place, gold medalist(s)
Seoul; Mohammed Al-Mishri (LBA); Alex Barto (SVK); Sairy Colón (PUR); María Giménez (VEN); Yuri Israelyan (ARM); Kim Ju-hee (KOR); Omaria Ramírez (DOM); Wu Xiao-zhang (TPE)	Mixed team	Los Angeles; L 3–5	did not advance			9

== Modern pentathlon ==
Venezuela qualified one pentathlete based on its performance at the Pan American Youth Olympic Games Qualifier.

Athlete	Event	Fencing Ranking Round (épée one touch)		Swimming (200 m freestyle)			Fencing Final round (épée one touch)			Combined: Shooting/Running (10 m air pistol)/(3000 m)			Total Points	Final Rank
Athlete	Event	Results	Rank	Time	Rank	Points	Results	Rank	Points	Time	Rank	Points	Total Points	Final Rank
Angel Hernandez (VEN)	Boys' Individual													
Angel Hernandez (VEN); Elžbieta Adomaitytė (LTU)	Mixed Relay													

== Sailing ==
Venezuela qualified one boat based on its performance at the Central and South American IKA Twin Tip Qualifiers.

- Girls' IKA Twin Tip Racing - 1 boat

== Triathlon ==
Venezuela qualified one athlete based on its performance at the 2018 American Youth Olympic Games Qualifier.

Individual

Athlete	Event	Swim (750m)	Trans 1	Bike (20 km)	Trans 2	Run (5 km)	Total Time	Rank
Karina Clemant	Girls	9:56	0:48	30:17	0:40	20:37	1:02:18	17

Relay

Athlete	Event	Total Times per Athlete (Swim 250m, Bike 6.6 km, Run 1.8 km)	Total Group Time	Rank
Americas 2 Karina Clemant (VEN); Cristian Andres Triana Peña (COL); Giovanna Lacerda (BRA); Javier Antonio de la Peña Schott (MEX)	Mixed Relay	23:23 (11); 21:26 (6); 23:49 (6); 22:01 (7)	1:30:39 1P	6

== Weightlifting ==
Venezuela qualified one quota in the boys' events and one quota in the girls' events based on the team ranking after the 2017 Weightlifting Youth World Championships.

Boy

Athlete	Event	Snatch		Clean & jerk		Total	Rank
Athlete	Event	Result	Rank	Result	Rank	Total	Rank
Carlos David Trejo Gonzalez	−62 kg	115	3	140	6	255	5

Girl

Athlete	Event	Snatch		Clean & jerk		Total	Rank
Athlete	Event	Result	Rank	Result	Rank	Total	Rank
Katherin Oriana Echandia Zarate	−44 kg	72	1	90	1	162	1st place, gold medalist(s)

== Wrestling ==
Key:
- VFA – Victory by Fall
- VSU – Without any points scored by the opponent
- VSU1 – With point(s) scored by the opponent
- VPO – Without any points scored by the opponent
- VPO1 – With point(s) scored by the opponent

Athlete	Event	Group stage					Final / RM	Rank
Athlete	Event	Opposition Score	Opposition Score	Opposition Score	Opposition Score	Rank	Opposition Score	Rank
María Jose Mosquera Rojas	Girls' freestyle −49kg	Varakina (BLR); L 3 – 8 ^{VPO1}	Ikei (USA); L 2 – 12 ^{VSU1}	Akhmedova (UZB); L 1 – 12 ^{VSU1}	Raimova (KAZ); W 14 – 8 ^{VPO1}	4 Q	Duenas (GUM); W 10 – 0 ^{VSU}	7
Mayra Alejandra Parra Alvarez	Girls' freestyle −57kg	Ringaci (MDA); L 2 – 11 ^{VPO1}	Szél (HUN); L 0 – 10 ^{VSU}	Mansi (IND); W 9 – 8 ^{VPO1}	Toida (CMR); W 10 – 0 ^{VSU}	3 Q	López (MEX); L 0 – 7 ^{VPO}	6
