= Germany at the 2018 Summer Youth Olympics =

- IOC code: GER
- NOC: German Olympic Sports Confederation
- Website: http://www.dosb.de/

in Buenos Aires, Argentina 6 – 18 October 2018
- Competitors: 75 in 23 sports
- Flag bearer: Elena Wassen
- Medals Ranked 19th: Gold 3 Silver 4 Bronze 2 Total 9

Summer Youth Olympics appearances
- 2010; 2014; 2018; 2026

Germany participated at the 2018 Summer Youth Olympics in Buenos Aires, Argentina from 6 October to 18 October 2018.

== Medalists ==
Medals awarded to participants of mixed-NOC teams are represented in italics. These medals are not counted towards the individual NOC medal tally.

Medal	Name	Sport	Event	Date
Gold	Raffaela Igl	Judo	Girls' 78 kg	9 October
Gold	Evan Brandes; Lara Lessmann	Cycling	Mixed BMX freestyle park	11 October
Gold	Vanessa Seeger	Shooting	Mixed 10 metre air pistol	12 October
Gold	Leni Freyja Wildgrube	Athletics	Girls' pole vault	14 October
Silver	Paul Veltrup	Fencing	Boys' épée	8 October
Silver	Angelina Köhler	Swimming	Girls' 100 metre butterfly	12 October
Silver	Marie Scheppan	Athletics	Girls' 400 metres	14 October
Silver	Zola Lewandowski	Canoeing	Girls' C1 slalom	16 October
Silver	Elena Wassen	Diving	Mixed team	17 October
Bronze	Angelina Köhler	Swimming	Girls' 50 metre butterfly	10 October
Bronze	Lilly Rotärmel	Gymnastics	Mixed multi-discipline team	10 October
Bronze	Marie Horn; Henry Graf	Triathlon	Mixed relay	11 October
Bronze	Lukas Resch	Badminton	Mixed teams	12 October
Bronze	Anastasia Blayvas	Wrestling	Girls' freestyle 57 kg	13 October

Medals by sport
Sport	1st place, gold medalist(s)	2nd place, silver medalist(s)	3rd place, bronze medalist(s)	Total
Athletics	1	1	0	2
Cycling	1	0	0	1
Judo	1	0	0	1
Swimming	0	1	1	2
Canoeing	0	1	0	1
Fencing	0	1	0	1
Wrestling	0	0	1	1
Total	3	4	2	9

Medals by date
Day	Date	1st place, gold medalist(s)	2nd place, silver medalist(s)	3rd place, bronze medalist(s)	Total
Day 1	7 October	0	0	0	0
Day 2	8 October	0	1	0	1
Day 3	9 October	1	0	0	1
Day 4	10 October	0	0	1	1
Day 5	11 October	1	0	0	1
Day 6	12 October	0	1	0	1
Day 7	13 October	0	0	1	1
Day 8	14 October	1	1	0	2
Day 9	15 October	0	0	0	0
Day 10	16 October	0	1	0	1
Day 11	17 October	0	0	0	0
Total		3	4	2	9

== Archery ==
Germany qualified one archer based on its performance at the 2017 World Archery Youth Championships. Later, Germany qualified a female archer based on its performance at the 2018 European Youth Championships.

Individual

Athlete	Event	Ranking round		Round of 32	Round of 16	Quarterfinals	Semifinals	Final / BM	Rank
Athlete	Event	Score	Seed	Opposition Score	Opposition Score	Opposition Score	Opposition Score	Opposition Score	Rank
Matthias Potrafke	Boys' Individual	651	24	Ak (TUR); L 4–6	Did not advance				
Clea Reisenweber	Girls' Individual	659	6	Trydvornava (BLR); W 6–0	Canales (ESP); L 2–6	Did not advance			
Clea Reisenweber (GER); Federico Fabrizzi (ITA)	Mixed team	1305	5	Jones (NZL); Tang (TPE); L 2–6	Did not advance				
Nada Amr Said Mohamed Azzam (EGY); Matthias Potrafke (GER)	Mixed team	1309	1	Mengyao (CHN); Tura (SMR); W 5–1	Giannasio (ARG); Soithong (THA); L 4–5	Did not advance			

== Athletics ==
Boys
Track and road events

Athlete	Event	Stage 1		Stage 2		Total	
Athlete	Event	Result	Rank	Result	Rank	Total	Rank
Fabian Olbert	100 m	10.93	4	10.59	7	21.52	6
Alexander Czysch	200 m	21.68	4	21.42	10	43.10	8
Clemens Erdmann	3000 m	—N/a		8:29.27	10	8:29.27	10
Clemens Erdmann	cross country	—N/a		12:29	27	12:29	27

Field events

Athlete	Event	Stage 1		Stage 2		Total	
Athlete	Event	Result	Rank	Result	Rank	Total	Rank
Nick Schmahl	Long jump	7.13	8	7.27	5	14.40	5
Sören Hilbig	Hammer throw	71.12	8	67.97	11	139.09	10
David Schepp	Javelin throw	65.44	14	64.23	14	129.67	14

Girls
Track and road events

Athlete	Event	Stage 1		Stage 2		Total	
Athlete	Event	Result	Rank	Result	Rank	Total	Rank
Beauty Somuah	100 m	12.32	10	11.74	9	24.06	9
Marie Scheppan	400 m	54.91	2	55.15	2	1:50.06	2nd place, silver medalist(s)
Sophia Volkmer	800 m	2:06.92 PB	2	2:09.53	4	4:16.45	4
Antje Pfüller	1500 m	—N/a		4:25.14	6	4:25.14	6
Antje Pfüller	cross country	—N/a		13:56	22	13:56	22
Linn Kleine	3000 m	—N/a		10:11.07	16	10:11.07	16
Linn Kleine	cross country	—N/a		14:57	44	14:57	44
Antonia Buschendorf	100 m hurdles	14.16	13	13.75	9	27.91	10
Gisèle Wender	400 m hurdles	1:01.16	7	1:01.02	8	2:02.18	7
Paula Schneiders	2000 m steeplechase	—N/a		6:44.20	6	6:44.20	6
Paula Schneiders	cross country	—N/a		14:06	28	14:06	28

Field events

Athlete	Event	Stage 1		Stage 2		Total	
Athlete	Event	Result	Rank	Result	Rank	Total	Rank
Jenna Fee Feyerabend	High jump	1.78 SB	4	1.79 SB	6	3.57	5
Leni Freyja Wildgrube	Pole vault	3.95	1	4.17	1	8.12	1st place, gold medalist(s)
Saskia Woidy	Long jump	5.64	9	6.10	6	11.74	7
Josefine Klisch	Shot put	14.73	10	14.34	12	29.07	11
Pia Northoff	Discus throw	49.33	5	46.21	9	95.54	7
Lea Wipper	Javelin throw	50.54	7	49.18	8	99.72	8

== Badminton ==
Germany qualified two players based on the Badminton Junior World Rankings.

- Boys' singles – Lukas Resch (1. BC Beuel)
- Girls' singles – Ann-Kathrin Svenja Spöri (TuS Geretsried)

Singles

Athlete	Event	Group stage				Quarterfinal	Semifinal	Final / BM	Rank
Athlete	Event	Opposition Score	Opposition Score	Opposition Score	Rank	Opposition Score	Opposition Score	Opposition Score	Rank
Lukas Resch	Boys' Singles	Yang (CAN); W 21–13, 21–18	Merklé (FRA); L 12–21, 21–18, 12–21	Barth (NOR); W 21–10, 13–21, 21–12	2	Did not advance			9
Ann-Kathrin Spöri	Girls' Singles	Pillai (SWE); W 19–21, 21–9, 21–13	Batari (INA); L 14–21, 9–21	Goh (MAS); L 7–21, 21–18, 9–21	3	Did not advance			9

Mixed

Athlete	Event	Group stage				Quarterfinal	Semifinal	Final / BM	Rank
Athlete	Event	Opposition Score	Opposition Score	Opposition Score	Rank	Opposition Score	Opposition Score	Opposition Score	Rank
Team Theta; Julien Carraggi (BEL); Mohamed Mostafa Kamel (EGY); Kodai Naraoka (JPN); Lukas Resch (GER); Zecily Fung (AUS); Jaqueline Lima (BRA); Hirari Mizui (JPN); Tereza Švábíková (CZE)	Mixed teams	Team Sigma (MIX); L 100–110	Team Omega (MIX); L 100–110	Team Gamma (MIX); L 107–110	4	Team Delta (MIX); W 110–93	Team Alpha (MIX); L 90–110	Team Zeta (MIX); W 110–107	3rd place, bronze medalist(s)
Team Sigma; Dennis Koppen (NED); Rukesh Maharjan (NEP); Ikhsan Rumbay (INA); Cristian Savin (MDA); Madeleine Caren Akoumba Ze (CMR); Grace King (GBR); Ann-Kathrin Spöri (GER); Wang Zhiyi (CHN)	Mixed teams	Team Theta (MIX); W 110–100	Team Gamma (MIX); W 110–86	Team Omega (MIX); L 98–110	2	Team Zeta (MIX); L 106–110	Did not advance		5

== Basketball ==
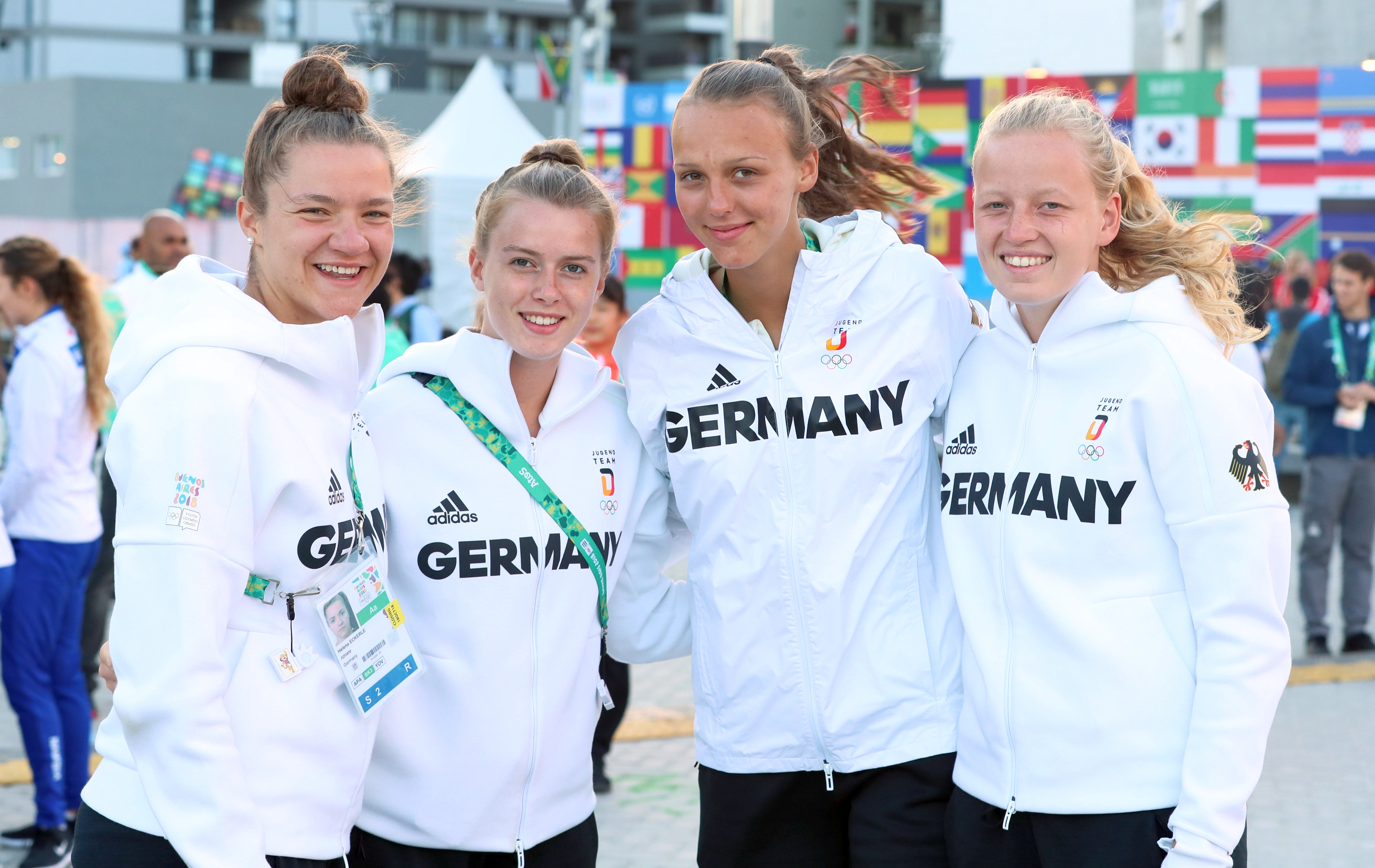
Eckerle, Enochs, Kucera and Eichmeyer at the Closing ceremony

3x3 tournament

Germany qualified a girls' team based on the U18 3x3 National Federation Ranking.

- Girls' tournament – 1 team of 4 athletes: Helena Paula Eckerle (BC Saarlouis / TV Saarlouis Royals), Emma Eichmeyer, Emily Beatrice Enochs (both Osnabrücker SC), Michaela Kucera (TSV Grünberg)

Group stage

Pos	Team	Pld	W	L	PF	PA	PD	Pts
1	Hungary	4	4	0	84	32	+52	8
2	China	4	3	1	64	60	+4	7
3	Germany	4	2	2	58	63	−5	6
4	Romania	4	1	3	58	71	−13	5
5	Iran	4	0	4	36	74	−38	4

7 October 2018
10:30

Romania	16–18	Germany

PlayGround, Buenos Aires

7 October 2018
13:30

China	18–12	Germany

PlayGround, Buenos Aires

11 October 2018
10:00

Germany	19–9	Iran

PlayGround, Buenos Aires

11 October 2018
12:00

Germany	9–20	Hungary

PlayGround, Buenos Aires

Shoot-out contest

Athlete	Event	Qualification		Final					
Athlete	Event	Points	Rank	Round 1	Round 2	Round 3	Round 4	Total	Rank
Emily Enochs	Shoot-out contest	2	28	Did not advance					
Helena Eckerle	Shoot-out contest	1	33	Did not advance					

== Beach volleyball ==
- Boys' tournament – Filip John (FC Schüttorf), Lukas Pfretzschner (VC Olympia Berlin)

Athletes	Event	Preliminary round	Standing	Round of 24	Round of 16	Quarterfinals	Semifinals	Final / BM	Rank
Athletes	Event	Opposition Score	Standing	Opposition Score	Opposition Score	Opposition Score	Opposition Score	Opposition Score	Rank
Filip John; Lukas Pfretzschner	Boys'	Åhman / Hellvig (SWE); W 17–21, 21–18, 15–9	1 Q	—N/a	Lezcano / Lobo (CRC); W 21–14, 21–10	Hellvig / Åhman (SWE); L 17–21, 16–21	Did not advance		
Filip John; Lukas Pfretzschner	Boys'	Colley / Koita (GAM); W 21–15, 21–8	1 Q	—N/a	Lezcano / Lobo (CRC); W 21–14, 21–10	Hellvig / Åhman (SWE); L 17–21, 16–21	Did not advance		
Filip John; Lukas Pfretzschner	Boys'	Glasgow / Louraine (VIN); W 21–3, 21–9	1 Q	—N/a	Lezcano / Lobo (CRC); W 21–14, 21–10	Hellvig / Åhman (SWE); L 17–21, 16–21	Did not advance		

== Canoeing ==
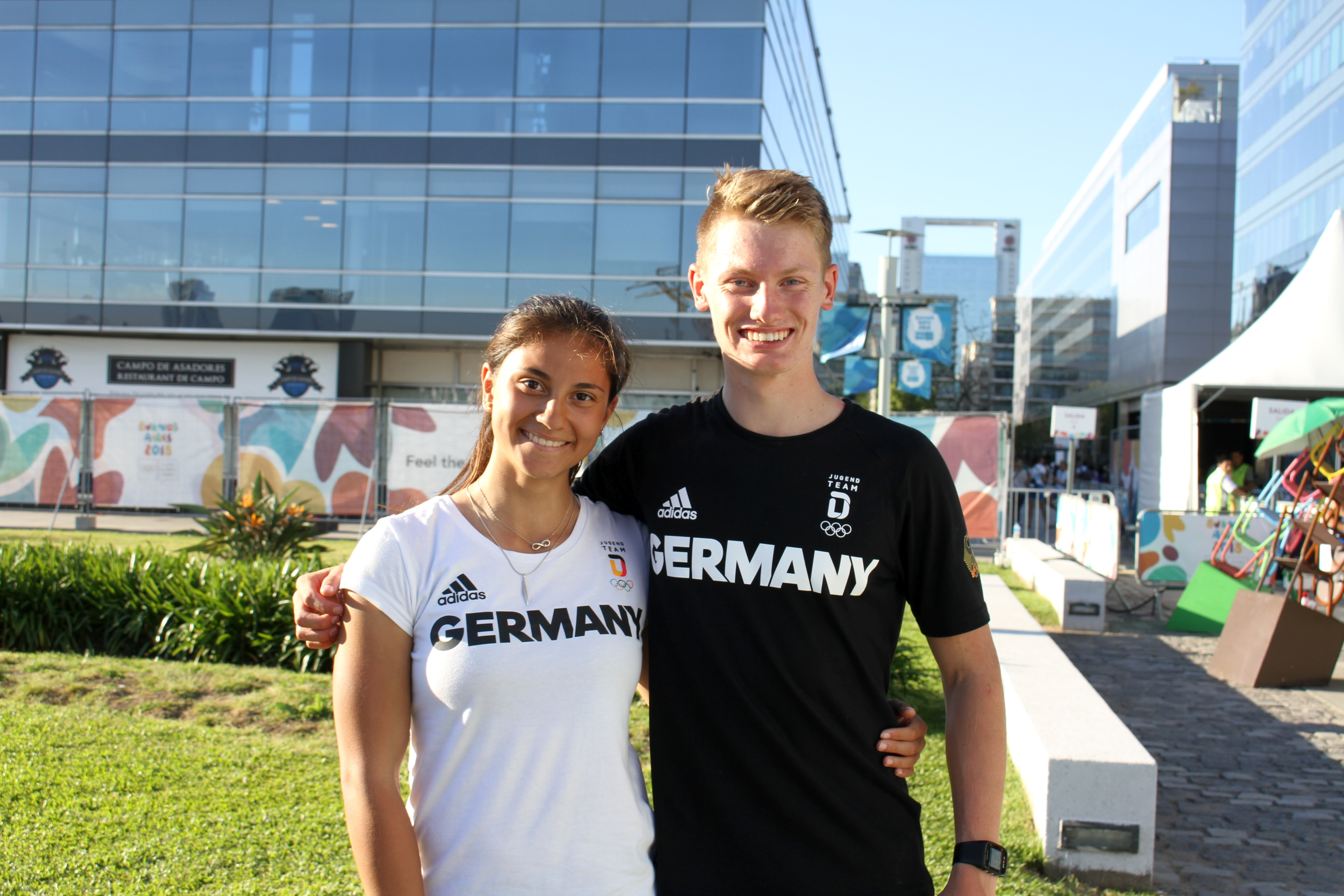
Gina Zint and Tim Bechtold at the YOG 2018

Germany qualified three boats based on its performance at the 2018 World Qualification Event.

Boys

Athlete	Event	Qualification		Repechage		Round of 16	Semifinals	Final / BM	Rank
Athlete	Event	Time	Rank	Time	Rank	Opposition Result	Opposition Result	Opposition Result	Rank
Tim Bechtold	C1 sprint	1:59.93	11 R	2:02.00	8	Did not advance			12
Tim Bechtold	C1 slalom	1:30.76	9 R	1:25.34	2 Q	Anderson (NZL); L 1:24.810	Did not advance		6

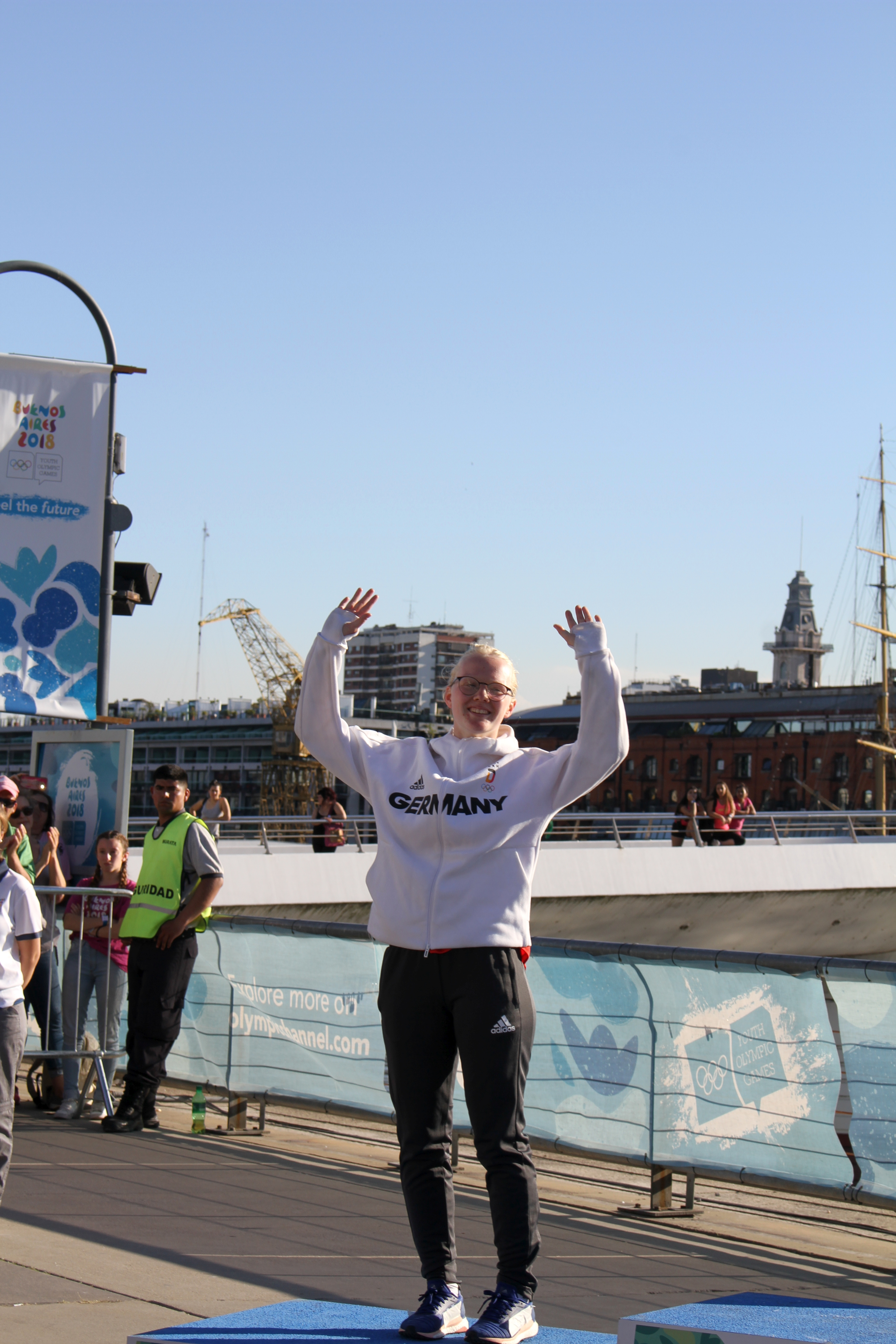
Zola Lewandowski at the Victory ceremony

Girls

Athlete	Event	Qualification		Repechage		Round of 16	Quarterfinals	Semifinals	Final / BM	Rank
Athlete	Event	Time	Rank	Time	Rank	Opposition Result	Opposition Result	Opposition Result	Opposition Result	Rank
Gina Zint	K1 sprint	1:54.49	3 Q	—N/a		Lai (TPE); W 1:55.190	Házová (CZE); W 1:54.230	Pecsuková (SVK); L 1:56.890	Sukhanova (KAZ); L 1:57.180	4
Gina Zint	K1 slalom	1:30.87	17 R	1:31.29	7 Q	Amusar (NGR); L 1:30.650	Did not advance			16
Zola Lewandowski	K1 sprint	2:25.65	20 R	2:22.49	11	Did not advance				18
Zola Lewandowski	K1 slalom	1:22.63	4 Q	—N/a		Massie (AUS); W 1:22.210	Amusar (NGR); W 1:21.830	Delassus (FRA); L 1:21.550	Lai (TPE); L 1:22.020	4
Zola Lewandowski	C1 sprint	2:49.21	13 R	2:41.24	4 Q	Otero (ESP); L 2:39.050	Did not advance			13
Zola Lewandowski	C1 slalom	1:29.17	3 Q	—N/a		Palamarchuk (UKR); W 1:28.520	Hein (USA); W 1:29.590	Luknárová (SVK); W 1:26.040	Delassus (FRA); L 1:26.860	2nd place, silver medalist(s)

== Cycling ==
Germany qualified a mixed BMX racing team based on its ranking in the Youth Olympic Games BMX Junior Nation Rankings. They also qualified two athletes in BMX freestyle based on its performance at the 2018 Urban Cycling World Championship.

- Mixed BMX racing team – Aron Lukas Beck (SZ Kornwestheim), Julia Möhser (BMX Team Cottbus)
- Mixed BMX freestyle – Evan Brandes (Mellowpark Berlin), Lara Marie Lessmann (Mellowpark Berlin)

Mixed BMX freestyle park

Athlete	Event	Seeding				Qualification				Final / Small final				Total points	Rank
Athlete	Event	Run 1	Run 2	Score	Seed	Run 1	Run 2	Score	Rank	Run 1	Run 2	Score	Rank	Total points	Rank
Evan Brandes	Mixed BMX freestyle park	79.33	83.66	81.49	1	82.00	85.33	83.66	1 Q	78.33	82.00	82.00	2	25	1st place, gold medalist(s)
Lara Lessmann	Mixed BMX freestyle park	74.66	86.00	80.33	1	82.00	82.33	82.16	1 Q	83.33	83.66	83.66	1	25	1st place, gold medalist(s)

Mixed BMX racing

Athlete	Event	Semifinal		Final		Total points	Rank
Athlete	Event	Points	Rank	Result	Rank	Total points	Rank
Aron Lukas Beck	Mixed BMX racing	19	6	Did not advance			13
Julia Möhser	Mixed BMX racing	18	6	Did not advance			13

== Diving ==
Athlete	Event	Preliminary		Final	
Athlete	Event	Points	Rank	Points	Rank
Lou Massenberg	Boys' 3 m springboard	512.20	5 Q	515.40	6
Lou Massenberg	Boys' 10 m platform	453.75	8 Q	493.80	5
Elena Wassen	Girls' 3 m springboard	370.80	11 Q	391.40	12
Elena Wassen	Girls' 10 m platform	365.60	5 Q	350.70	6
Michelle Heimberg (SUI); Lou Massenberg (GER)	Mixed team	—N/a		328.50	8
Elena Wassen (GER); Lian Junjie (CHN)	Mixed team	—N/a		390.10	2nd place, silver medalist(s)

== Fencing ==
Germany qualified two athletes based on its performance at the 2018 Cadet World Championship.

- Boys' Épée – Paul Veltrup (Fecht Club Krefeld)
- Boys' Sabre – Antonio Heathcock (TSG Eislingen)

Athlete	Event	Pool Round	Seed	Round of 16	Quarterfinals	Semifinals	Final / BM	Rank
Athlete	Event	Opposition Score	Seed	Opposition Score	Opposition Score	Opposition Score	Opposition Score	Rank
Paul Veltrup	Épée	Tolasov (RUS) W 4–3; Jarov (CAN) W 5–4; Asami (JPN) W 5–2; Pérez (ARG) W 5–3; Baudunov (KGZ) L 2–5	1	—N/a	Herbst (USA); W 13–12	Baudunov (KGZ); W 15–12	Di Veroli (ITA); L 4–11	2nd place, silver medalist(s)
Antonio Heathcock	Sabre	Rabb (HUN) L 4–5; Shaker (IRI) W 5–4; Coly (SEN) W 5–0; Vidovszky (USA) W 5–3; Elaraby (EGY) W 5–2; Mahbas (IRQ) W 5–1; Hyun (KOR) L 4–5	4	Al-Bahrani (KSA); W 15–9	Rabb (HUN); L 11–15	Did not advance		7

Team

Athletes	Event	Quarterfinals	Classification place 5–8	Classification place 5	Semifinals	Final / BM	Rank
Athletes	Event	Opposition Result	Opposition Result	Opposition Result	Opposition Result	Opposition Result	Rank
Team Europe 2 Veronika Bieleszova (CZE); Rebeca Candescu (ROU); Jolien Corteyn (BEL); Paul Veltrup (GER); Jonas Winterberg-Poulsen (DEN); Samuel Jarry (FRA)	Mixed team	Team Europe 3 (MIX); L 24–30	Team Africa (MIX); W 43–13	Team Asia-Oceania 2 (MIX); L 22–30	Did not advance		6

== Golf ==
- Boys' individual – Lukas Bastian Buller (Frankfurter Golf Club)
- Girls' individual – Paula Friedericke Kirner (Kiawah Golfpark Riedstadt)
- Mixed team – Lukas Bastian Buller, Paula Friedericke Kirner

Individual

Athlete	Event	Round 1		Round 2			Round 3			Total		
Athlete	Event	Score	Rank	Score	Total	Rank	Score	Total	Rank	Score	To Par	Rank
Lukas Bastian Buller	Boys	74 (+4)	16	78 (+8)	152	26	76 (+6)	228	20	228	+18	22
Paula Friedericke Kirner	Girls	73 (+3)	8	73 (+3)	146	9	74 (+4)	220	12	220	+10	5

Team

Athletes	Event	Round 1 (Foursome)		Round 2 (Fourball)			Round 3 (Individual Stroke)				Total	
Athletes	Event	Score	Rank	Score	Total	Rank	Boy	Girl	Total	Rank	Score	Rank
Lukas Bastian Buller; Paula Friedericke Kirner	Mixed	66 (−4)	16	74 (+4)	140	15	72	74	146 (+6)	11	286	13

== Gymnastics ==
=== Artistic ===
Germany qualified two gymnasts based on its performance at the 2018 European Junior Championship.

- Boys' artistic individual all-around – Daniel Schwed (SC Berlin)
- Girls' artistic individual all-around – Lisa Zimmermann (TuS Chemnitz-Altendorf)

Boys

Athlete	Event	Apparatus						Total	Rank
Athlete	Event	F	PH	R	V	PB	HB	Total	Rank
Daniel Schwed	Qualification	13.483 Q	13.233 Q	12.033	13.433	12.333	12.500	77.015	11 Q
Daniel Schwed	All-around	13.266	11.733	12.766	13.366	12.458	12.300	75.889	12
Daniel Schwed	Floor	13.166	—N/a					13.166	8
Daniel Schwed	Pommel horse	—N/a	13.166	—N/a				13.166	4

Girls

Athlete	Event	Apparatus				Total	Rank
Athlete	Event	V	UB	BB	F	Total	Rank
Lisa Zimmermann	Qualification	13.233 Q	12.600	12.100	12.466	50.399	7 Q
Lisa Zimmermann	All-around	13.483	12.466	10.633	12.366	48.948	12
Lisa Zimmermann	Vault	13.366	—N/a			13.366	5

=== Rhythmic ===
Germany qualified one rhythmic gymnast based on its performance at the European qualification event.

- Girls' rhythmic individual all-around – Lilly Rotärmel (1. VfL Fortuna Marzahn)

Athlete	Event	Qualification						Final					
Athlete	Event	Hoop	Ball	Clubs	Ribbon	Total	Rank	Hoop	Ball	Clubs	Ribbon	Total	Rank
Lilly Rotärmel	All-around	13.500	11.650	13.750	9.300	48.200	27	Did not advance					

=== Multidiscipline ===
Team	Athlete	Acrobatic	Artistic	Rhythmic	Trampoline	Total points	Rank
Yellow	Anastassiya Arkhipova (KAZ); Dmitriy Nemerenko (KAZ)	15	—N/a			410	9
Yellow	Uri Zeidel (ISR)	—N/a	105	—N/a		410	9
Yellow	Sergei Naidin (RUS)	—N/a	31	—N/a		410	9
Yellow	Mathys Cordule (FRA)	—N/a	21	—N/a		410	9
Yellow	Zarith Imaan Khalid (MAS)	—N/a	41	—N/a		410	9
Yellow	Lisa Zimmermann (GER)	—N/a	36	—N/a		410	9
Yellow	Milka Dona (SRI)	—N/a	33	—N/a		410	9
Yellow	Natalie Garcia (CAN)	—N/a		19	—N/a	410	9
Yellow	Ioanna Magopoulou (GRE)	—N/a		28	—N/a	410	9
Yellow	Ketevan Arbolishvili (GEO)	—N/a		42	—N/a	410	9
Yellow	Takumi Fujimoto (JPN)	—N/a			20	410	9
Yellow	Michelle Mares (MEX)	—N/a			19	410	9
Purple	Rachel Nell (RSA); Sidwell Madibeng (RSA)	33	—N/a			389	5
Purple	Daniel Schwed (GER)	—N/a	63	—N/a		389	5
Purple	Marcus Stenberg (SWE)	—N/a	27	—N/a		389	5
Purple	Diogo Brajão Soares (BRA)	—N/a	34	—N/a		389	5
Purple	Beatriz Cardoso (POR)	—N/a	33	—N/a		389	5
Purple	Ana-Maria Puiu (ROU)	—N/a	42	—N/a		389	5
Purple	Yunseo Lee (KOR)	—N/a	46	—N/a		389	5
Purple	Aurora Arvelo (FIN)	—N/a		38	—N/a	389	5
Purple	Khrystyna Pohranychna (UKR)	—N/a		22	—N/a	389	5
Purple	Zilu Wang (CHN)	—N/a		12	—N/a	389	5
Purple	Nikita Babyonishev (UZB)	—N/a			16	389	5
Purple	Yekaterina Lukina (KAZ)	—N/a			23	389	5
Black	Viktoryia Akhotnikava (BLR); Ilya Famenkou (BLR)	12	—N/a			352	3rd place, bronze medalist(s)
Black	Brandon Briones (USA)	—N/a	32	—N/a		352	3rd place, bronze medalist(s)
Black	Adam Tobin (GBR)	—N/a	45	—N/a		352	3rd place, bronze medalist(s)
Black	Mohamed Afify (EGY)	—N/a		—N/a		352	3rd place, bronze medalist(s)
Black	Indira Ulmasova (UZB)	—N/a	52	—N/a		352	3rd place, bronze medalist(s)
Black	Karla Perez (GUA)	—N/a	35	—N/a		352	3rd place, bronze medalist(s)
Black	Tonya Paulsson (SWE)	—N/a	38	—N/a		352	3rd place, bronze medalist(s)
Black	Lidiia Iakovleva (AUS)	—N/a		35	—N/a	352	3rd place, bronze medalist(s)
Black	Aino Yamada (JPN)	—N/a		31	—N/a	352	3rd place, bronze medalist(s)
Black	Lilly Rotärmel (GER)	—N/a		34	—N/a	352	3rd place, bronze medalist(s)
Black	Santiago Escallier (ARG)	—N/a			21	352	3rd place, bronze medalist(s)
Black	Antonia Sakellaridou (GRE)	—N/a			17	352	3rd place, bronze medalist(s)

== Judo ==
- Girls' Individual – Raffaela Regina Igl (TSV Abensberg)

Individual

Athlete	Event	Round of 16	Quarterfinals	Semifinals	Rep 1	Rep 2	Rep 3	Final / BM	Rank
Athlete	Event	Opposition Result	Opposition Result	Opposition Result	Opposition Result	Opposition Result	Opposition Result	Opposition Result	Rank
Raffaela Regina Igl	Girls' −78 kg	Bye	Lobnik (SLO); W 001–000	Rosa (BRA); W 002–000	—N/a			Gritsenko (KAZ); W 111–000	1st place, gold medalist(s)

Team

Athletes	Event	Round of 16	Quarterfinals	Semifinals	Final	
Athletes	Event	Opposition Result	Opposition Result	Opposition Result	Opposition Result	Rank
Team Los Angeles; Nahomys Acosta Batte (CUB); Alin Bagrin (MDA); Georgios Balarjishvili (CYP); Soniya Bhatta (NEP); Saskia Brothers (AUS); Turpal Djoukaev (FIN); Raffaela Igl (GER); Ariel Shulman (ISR)	Mixed team	Team Seoul (MIX); W 5–3	Team Athens (MIX); L 3–5	Did not advance		

== Modern pentathlon ==
- Boys' individual – Pele Uibel (Wasserfreunde Spandau)

Athlete	Event	Fencing Ranking Round (épée one touch)		Swimming (200 m freestyle)			Fencing Final round (épée one touch)		Combined: Shooting/Running (10 m air pistol)/(3000 m)			Total Points	Final Rank
Athlete	Event	Results	Rank	Time	Rank	Points	Rank	Points	Time	Rank	Points	Total Points	Final Rank
Pele Uibel	Boys' Individual	242	4	2:15.33	22	280	4	242	11:21.42	3	619	1141	4
Agnieszka Wysokińska (POL); Pele Uibel (GER)	Mixed relay	DNS											

== Roller speed skating ==
Germany qualified one roller skater based on its performance at the 2018 Roller Speed Skating World Championship.

- Girls' combined speed event – Angelina Otto (RSV Blau-Weiss Gera)

Athlete	Event	500 metres sprint								1000 metres sprint						5000 metres elimination			Total	
Athlete	Event	Quarterfinal		Semifinal		Final		Point	Rank	Semifinal		Final		Point	Rank	Result	Point	Rank	Point	Rank
Athlete	Event	Result	Rank	Result	Rank	Result	Rank	Point	Rank	Result	Rank	Result	Rank	Point	Rank	Result	Point	Rank	Point	Rank
Angelina Otto	Girls' combined events	51.917	11	Did not qualify				4	11	1:38.341	6 Q	1:40.491	6	9	6	E	6	9	19	9

== Rowing ==
Germany qualified two boats based on its performance at the 2017 World Junior Rowing Championships.

- Boys' pair – Jasper Elias Angl (RV Neptun Konstanz), Elias Nikolaus Kun (Tübinger RV „Fidelia“)
- Girls' single sculls – Tabea Kuhnert (SC Magdeburg)

Athlete	Event	Time trial		Heats						Quarterfinals		Semifinals		Final	
Athlete	Event	Time trial		Round 1		Round 2		Points	Rank	Quarterfinals		Semifinals		Final	
Athlete	Event	Time	Rank	Time	Rank	Time	Rank	Points	Rank	Time	Rank	Time	Rank	Time	Rank
Jasper Elias Angl; Elias Nikolaus Kun	Boys' pair	3:32.98	10	1:40.55	4	1:39.72	4	4	12 FC	—N/a				1:36.59	12
Tabea Kuhnert	Girls' single sculls	4:05.03	13	1:57.91	2	1:55.87	3	7	14 Q	1:48.72	4 SC/D	1:48.58	3 FD	1:50.11	13

Qualification Legend: FA=Final A (medal); FB=Final B (non-medal); FC=Final C (non-medal); FD=Final D (non-medal); SA/B=Semifinals A/B; SC/D=Semifinals C/D; R=Repechage

== Sailing ==
Germany qualified one boat based on its performance at the 2018 IKA Twin Tip Racing World Championships. They also qualified one boat based on its performance at the 2018 Nacra 15 European Qualifiers.

- Girls' IKA Twin Tip Racing – Alina Lisa Kornelli (WSC Starnberg/Reichersbeuern)
- Mixed Nacra 15 – Romy Felicitas Mackenbrock (NRV Münster), Silas Mühle (HSC Hamburg)

Athlete	Event	Race													Total score	Net score	Final rank
Athlete	Event	1	2	3	4	5	6	7	8	9	10	11	12	M*	Total score	Net score	Final rank
Alina Lisa Kornelli	Girls' IKA Twin Tip Racing	8	1	1	1	1	1	Cancelled						4	13	4	4
Romy Felicitas Mackenbrock; Silas Mühle	Nacra 15 Mixed	UFD (15)	2	6	5	2	4	6	8	7	11	7	3	9	85	70	5

== Shooting ==
Germany qualified two sport shooters based on its performance at the 2017 European Championships. Germany later qualified two more sport shooter based on its performance at the 2018 European Championships.

- Boys' 10m Air Rifle – Maximilian Benedikt Ulbrich (SG Wilzhofen)
- Boys' 10m Air Pistol – Jan Luca Karstedt (Schützenverein Stinstedt)
- Girls' 10m Air Rifle – Anna Janssen (SSG Kevelaer)
- Girls' 10m Air Pistol – Vanessa Seeger (USK Fallersleben)
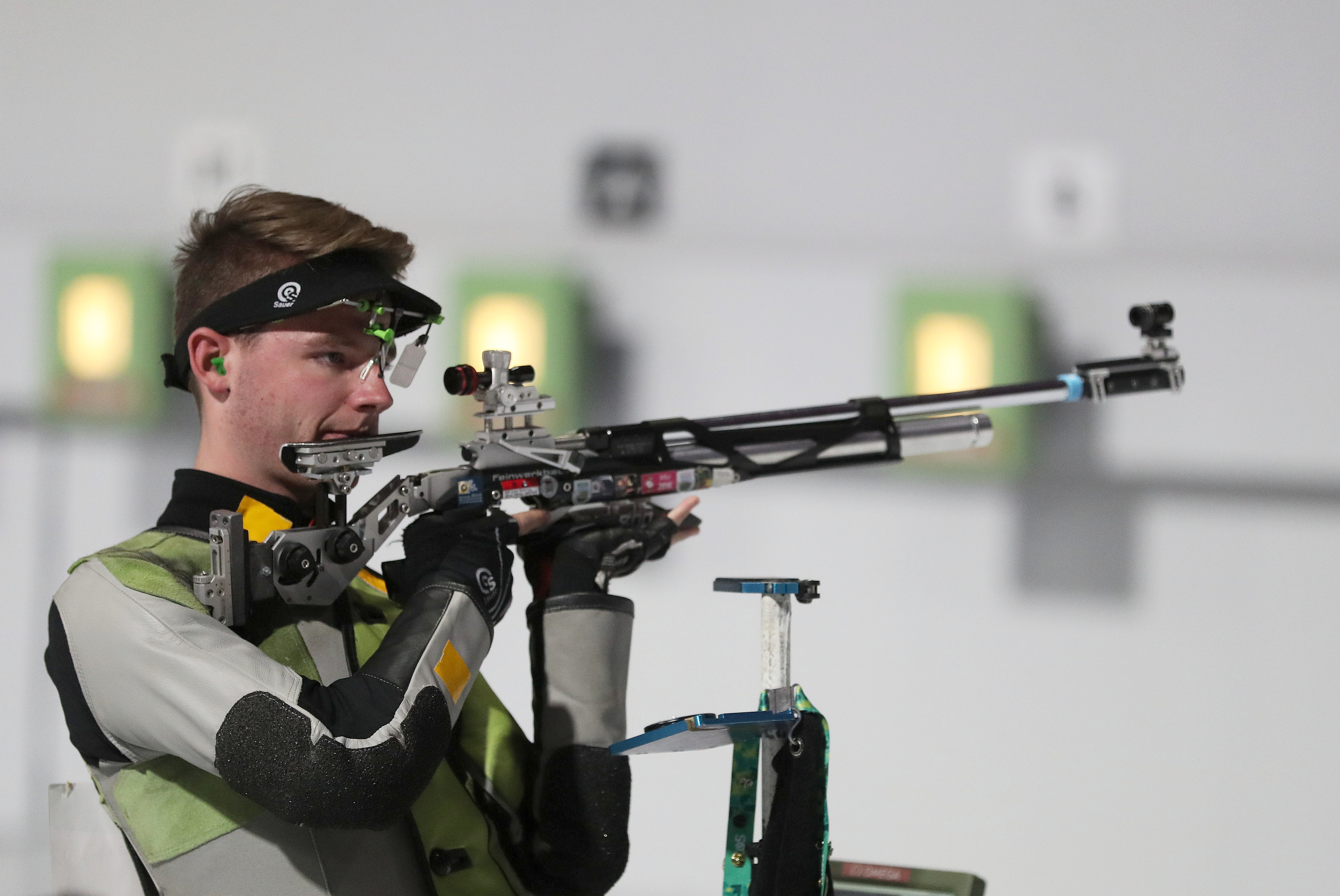
Maximilian Ulbrich

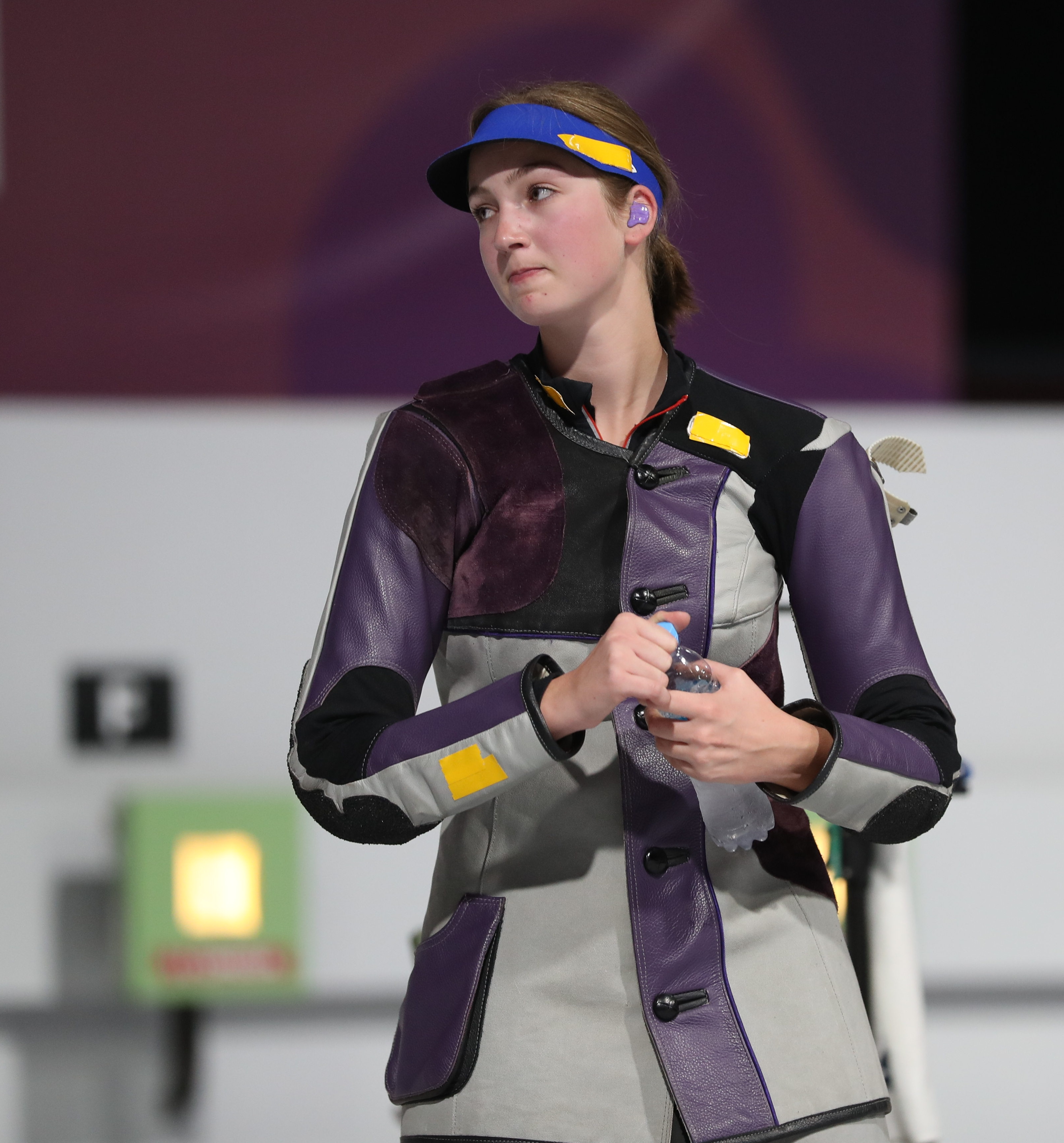
Anna Janßen

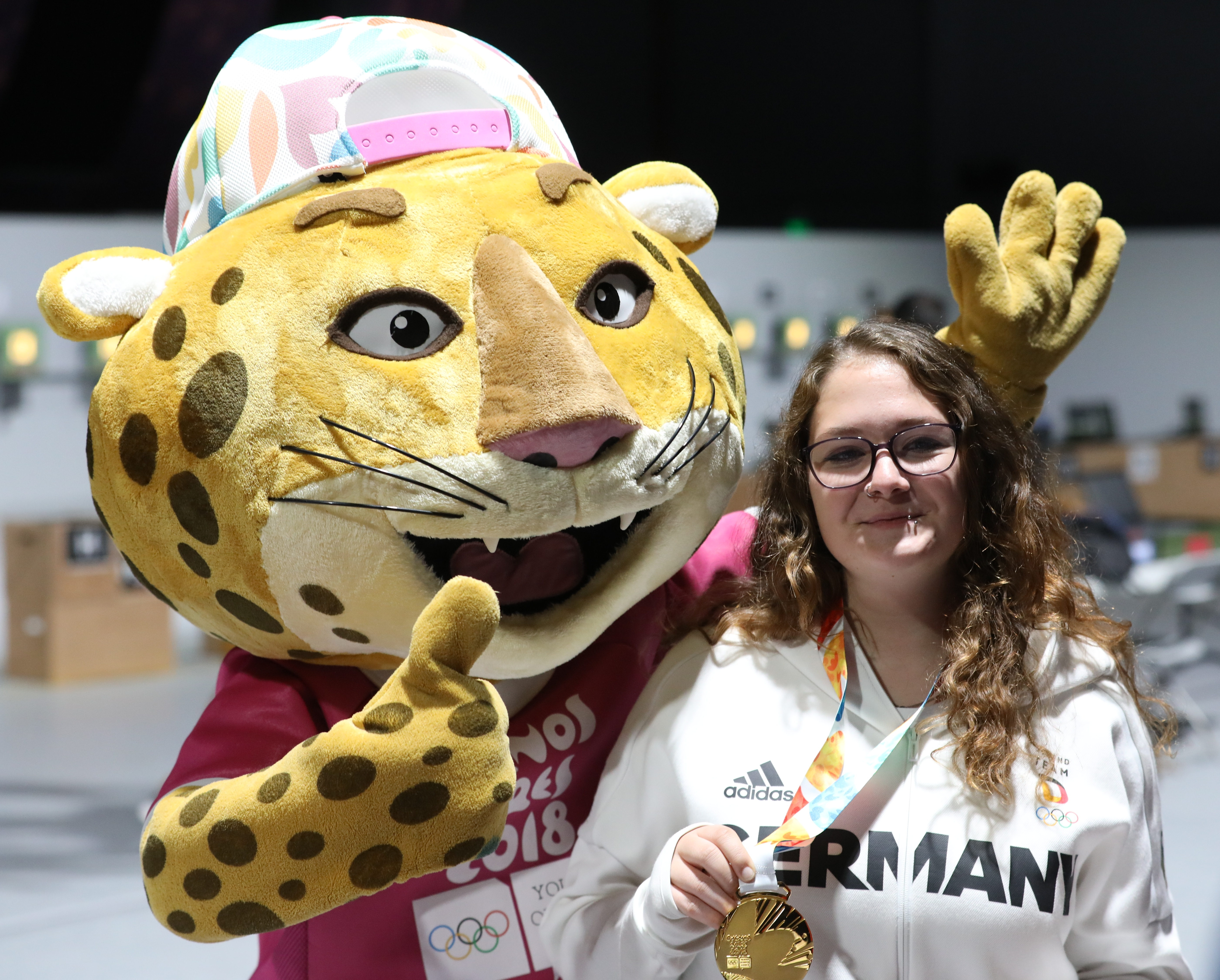
Vanessa Seeger

Individual

Athlete	Event	Qualification		Final	
Athlete	Event	Points	Rank	Points	Rank
Maximilian Ulbrich	Boys' 10m air rifle	620.4	7 Q	162.9	6
Jan Luca Karstedt	Boys' 10m air pistol	567 -14x	7 Q	156.4	6
Anna Janssen	Girls' 10m air rifle	621.8	6 Q	206.5	4
Vanessa Seeger	Girls' 10m air pistol	559 -9x	10	Did not advance	

Team

Athletes	Event	Qualification		Round of 16	Quarterfinals	Semifinals	Final / BM	
Athletes	Event	Points	Rank	Opposition Result	Opposition Result	Opposition Result	Opposition Result	Rank
Aoi Takagi (JPN); Maximilian Ulbrich (GER)	Mixed 10 metre air rifle	825.1	7 Q	Martínez López (MEX); Wadlegger (AUT); L 7–10	Did not advance			
Anna Janßen (GER); Chanidu Seanayake (SRI)	Mixed 10 metre air rifle	819.0	14 Q	Rossiter (AUS); Babayan (ARM); L 9–10	Did not advance			
Juana Rueda Vargas (COL); Jan Luca Karstedt (GER)	Mixed 10 metre air pistol	750	6 Q	Khutsiberidze (GEO); Ng (CAN); W 10–7	Vanessa Seeger (GER); Kiril Kirov (BUL); L 5–10	Did not advance		
Vanessa Seeger (GER); Kiril Kirov (BUL)	Mixed 10 metre air pistol	754	3 Q	Nicolas (FRA); Miller (GBR); W 10–5	Juana Rueda Vargas (COL); Jan Luca Karstedt (GER); W 10–5	Al-Kaabi (IRQ); Son (BEL); W 10–6	Bhaker (IND); Fayzullaev (TJK); W 10–3	1st place, gold medalist(s)

== Sport climbing ==
Germany qualified one sport climber based on its performance at the 2017 World Youth Sport Climbing Championships.

- Girls' combined – 1 quota (Hannah Luisa Meul) (DAV Sektion Rheinland-Köln)

Athlete	Event	Qualification					Final				
Athlete	Event	Speed	Bouldering	Lead	Total	Rank	Speed	Bouldering	Lead	Total	Rank
Hannah Luisa Meul	Girls' combined	10	2	7	140	5 Q	4	5	1	20	4

== Swimming ==
Boys

Athlete	Event	Heat		Semifinal		Final	
Athlete	Event	Time	Rank	Time	Rank	Time	Rank
Luca Armbruster	50 m butterfly	24.30	8 Q	24.45	13	Did not advance	
Luca Armbruster	100 m butterfly	54.51	17	Did not advance			
Maurice Ingenrieth	50 m butterfly	25.08	24	Did not advance			
Maurice Ingenrieth	100 m butterfly	54.56	19	Did not advance			
Maurice Ingenrieth	200 m butterfly	2:03.13	15	—N/a		Did not advance	
Rafael Miroslaw	50 m freestyle	23.77	22	Did not advance			
Rafael Miroslaw	100 m freestyle	50.54	6 Q	50.28	6 Q	50.13	6
Rafael Miroslaw	200 m freestyle	1:51.59	14	—N/a		Did not advance	
Aaron Schmidt	400 m freestyle	3:57.03	19	—N/a		Did not advance	
Aaron Schmidt	800 m freestyle	—N/a				8:11.73	

Girls

Athlete	Event	Heat		Semifinal		Final	
Athlete	Event	Time	Rank	Time	Rank	Time	Rank
Angelina Köhler	50 m freestyle	26.15	13 Q	DNS		Did not advance	
Angelina Köhler	100 m freestyle	57.27	23	Did not advance			
Angelina Köhler	50 m butterfly	26.96	5 Q	26.65	1 Q	26.68	3rd place, bronze medalist(s)
Angelina Köhler	100 m butterfly	59.99	1 Q	59.78	2 Q	59.44	2nd place, silver medalist(s)
Anna Kroniger	50 m breaststroke	33.98	29	Did not advance			
Anna Kroniger	100 m breaststroke	1:11.51	18	Did not advance			
Anna Kroniger	200 m breaststroke	2:30.65	5 Q	—N/a		2:30.93	8
Julia Mrozinski	100 m freestyle	56.97	17	Did not advance			
Julia Mrozinski	200 m freestyle	2:00.00	2 Q	—N/a		1:58.84	4
Julia Mrozinski	50 m butterfly	DNS		Did not advance			
Julia Mrozinski	100 m butterfly	1:02.56	20	Did not advance			
Céline Rieder	200 m freestyle	2:04.48	21	—N/a		Did not advance	
Céline Rieder	400 m freestyle	4:18.10	11	—N/a		Did not advance	
Céline Rieder	800 m freestyle	—N/a				8:43.73	5

Mixed

Athlete	Event	Heat		Semifinal		Final	
Athlete	Event	Time	Rank	Time	Rank	Time	Rank
Rafael Miroslaw; Luca Armbruster; Angelina Köhler; Julia Mrozinski	4 × 100 metre freestyle relay	3:34.09	4 Q	—N/a		3:33.03	4
Julia Mrozinski; Anna Kroniger; Luca Armbruster; Rafael Miroslaw	4 × 100 metre medley relay	3:58.07	8 Q	—N/a		3:57.88	8

== Table tennis ==
Germany qualified two table tennis players based on its performance at the Road to Buenos Aires (North America) series.

- Boys' singles – Cédric Meissner (TuS Celle)
- Girls' singles – Franziska Schreiner (TV Hofstetten)

Singles

Athlete	Event	Group stage	Rank	Round of 16	Quarterfinals	Semifinals	Final / BM	Rank
Athlete	Event	Opposition Score	Rank	Opposition Score	Opposition Score	Opposition Score	Opposition Score	Rank
Cédric Meissner	Boys'	Group H Sgouropoulos (GRE); L 11–8, 1–11, 4–11, 11–7, 9–11, 4–11	3	Did not advance				
Cédric Meissner	Boys'	Solanke (NGR); W 5–11, 11–8, 11–3, 11–5, 11–6	3	Did not advance				
Cédric Meissner	Boys'	Pang (SGP); L 5–11, 6–11, 7–11, 11–7, 9–11	3	Did not advance				
Franziska Schreiner	Girls'	Group D Chang (MAS); W 10–12, 11–5, 11–10, 13–11, 11–9	3	Did not advance				
Franziska Schreiner	Girls'	Díaz (PUR); L 12–14, 11–13, 8–11, 8–11	3	Did not advance				
Franziska Schreiner	Girls'	Laurenti (ITA); L 6–11, 4–11, 11–9, 9–11, 4–11,	3	Did not advance				

Team

Athletes	Event	Group stage	Rank	Round of 16	Quarterfinals	Semifinals	Final / BM	Rank
Athletes	Event	Opposition Score	Rank	Opposition Score	Opposition Score	Opposition Score	Opposition Score	Rank
Germany; Franziska Schreiner (GER); Cédric Meissner (GER)	Mixed	Group D Wang (CHN); Sun (CHN); L 0–3	3	Did not advance				
Germany; Franziska Schreiner (GER); Cédric Meissner (GER)	Mixed	Solanke (NGR); Oribamise (NGR); W 3–0	3	Did not advance				
Germany; Franziska Schreiner (GER); Cédric Meissner (GER)	Mixed	Mutti (ITA); Laurenti (ITA); L 1–2	3	Did not advance				

Qualification Legend: Q=Main Bracket (medal); qB=Consolation Bracket (non-medal)

== Taekwondo ==
- Girls' 55 kg – Vanessa Bettina Beckstein (SV Nennslingen)

Athlete	Event	Round of 16	Quarterfinals	Semifinals	Final	Rank
Athlete	Event	Opposition Result	Opposition Result	Opposition Result	Opposition Result	Rank
Vanessa Bettina Beckstein	−55kg	Georgievska (MKD); W DSQ	Tzeli (GRE); L 11–19	Did not advance		

== Triathlon ==
Germany qualified two athletes based on its performance at the 2018 European Youth Olympic Games Qualifier.

- Boys' individual – Henry Christopher Graf (MTV Kronberg)
- Girls' individual – Marie Horn (SK Ramsau)

Individual

Athlete	Event	Swim (750m)	Trans 1	Bike (20 km)	Trans 2	Run (5 km)	Total Time	Rank
Henry Christopher Graf	Boys'	9:39	0:29	27:31	0:30	16:58	55:07	9
Marie Horn	Girls'	9:59	0:44	30:19	0:31	19:08	1:00:41	8

Relay

Athlete	Event	Total times per athlete (Swim 250m, Bike 6.6 km, Run 1.8 km)	Total group time	Rank
Team Europe 3 Marie Horn (GER); Henry Graf (GER); Emilie Noyer (FRA); Igor Bellido (ESP)	Mixed relay	23:39; 20:42; 23:13; 21:25	1:28:59	3rd place, bronze medalist(s)

== Wrestling ==
- Girls' Freestyle −57 kg – Anastasia Blayvas (KFC Leipzig)

Key:

- VT – Victory by Fall.
- PP – Decision by Points – the loser with technical points.
- PO – Decision by Points – the loser without technical points.

Athlete	Event	Group stage					Final / BM / RM	Rank
Athlete	Event	Opposition Score	Opposition Score	Opposition Score	Opposition Score	Rank	Opposition Score	Rank
Anastasia Blayvas	Freestyle −57 kg	Ahmed (EGY); W 3–0	Ozaki (JPN); L 0–10	Quintanilla (GUM); W 2–0^{VT}	López (MEX); W 2–0^{VT}	2	Bronze-medal match Ringaci (MDA); W 6–3	3rd place, bronze medalist(s)
