= Egypt at the 2018 Summer Youth Olympics =

- IOC code: EGY
- NOC: Egyptian Olympic Committee
- Website: http://www.egyptianolympic.org/

in Buenos Aires, Argentina 6 – 18 October 2018
- Competitors: 68 in 23 sports
- Medals Ranked 22nd: Gold 3 Silver 2 Bronze 7 Total 12

Summer Youth Olympics appearances (overview)
- 2010; 2014; 2018; 2026

Egypt participated with a total of 68 athletes at the 2018 Summer Youth Olympics in Buenos Aires, Argentina. Olympians have to be aged 14–18 in order to participate.

Egypt's run in Buenos Aires has been able to set many records. With a total amount of 12 medals, this was Egypt's most-successful Olympics.

Egypt won its first Olympics medal in a kicking sport when Egypt's Youth Futsal team took bronze in the men's event. Egypt was also able to mark their first Olympics medals in karate and boxing.

It is also noteworthy that Egypt was able to set these records despite sending a record low amount of Olympians to participate (compared to 2010 and 2014 Youth Olympics).

Egypt was ranked 22nd out of 93 nations in the final medals table.

== Medalists ==
Medal	Name	Sport	Event	Date
Gold	Salma Abdelmaksoud	Modern pentathlon	Girls' individual	October 13
Gold	Ahmed Elgendy	Modern pentathlon	Boys' individual	October 14
Gold	Yasmin Nasr Elgewily	Karate	Girls' 53 kg	October 17
Silver	Neama Said Fahmi Said	Weightlifting	Girls' 58 kg	October 11
Silver	Rawan Ayman Bakarat	Athletics	Women's hammer	October 15
Bronze	Mazen Elaraby	Fencing	Boys' Sabre	October 7
Bronze	Abdelrahman Sameh	Swimming	50 m freestyle	October 10
Bronze	Eyad Adel Mahmoud	Taekwondo	Boys' 73 kg	October 10
Bronze	Abdalla Galal Mohamed Mostafa	Weightlifting	Boys' 77 kg	October 11
Bronze	Ahmed Mahmoud Khalil	Wrestling	Boys' 110 kg	October 14
Bronze	Ahmed Elsawy Awad Elbaz	Boxing	Men's over 91kg	October 17
Bronze	Egyptian U-18 Futsal Team	Futsal	Men's	October 18

Medals by sport
Sport	1st place, gold medalist(s)	2nd place, silver medalist(s)	3rd place, bronze medalist(s)	Total
Modern pentathlon	2	0	0	2
Karate	1	0	0	1
Weightlifting	0	1	1	2
Athletics	0	1	0	1
Fencing	0	0	1	1
Swimming	0	0	1	1
Boxing	0	0	1	1
Wrestling	0	0	1	1
Futsal	0	0	1	1
Taekwondo	0	0	1	1

Medals by date
Day	Date	1st place, gold medalist(s)	2nd place, silver medalist(s)	3rd place, bronze medalist(s)	Total
Day 1	7 October	0	0	1	1
Day 2	8 October	0	0	0	0
Day 3	9 October	0	0	0	0
Day 4	10 October	0	0	2	2
Day 5	11 October	0	1	1	2
Day 6	12 October	0	0	0	0
Day 7	13 October	1	0	0	1
Day 8	14 October	1	0	1	2
Day 9	15 October	0	1	0	1
Day 10	16 October	0	0	0	0
Day 11	17 October	1	0	1	2
Day 12	18 October	0	0	1	1
Total		3	2	7	12

== Competitors ==
Sport	Boys	Girls	Total
Archery	1	1	2
Athletics	2	2	4
Badminton	1	0	1
Basketball	0	4	4
Beach volleyball	0	2	2
Boxing	3	0	3
Cycling	0	2	2
Equestrian	1	0	1
Fencing	3	2	5
Futsal	10	0	10
Judo	1	1	0
Karate	0	1	1
Modern pentathlon	1	1	2
Gymnastics	1	2	3
Rowing	2	1	3
Sailing	1	1	2
Shooting	1	1	2
Swimming	2	2	4
Table tennis	1	1	2
Taekwondo	2	1	3
Triathlon	1	1	2
Weightlifting	1	1	2
Wrestling	4	2	6

== Archery ==
Individual

Athlete	Event	Ranking round		Round of 32	Round of 16	Quarterfinals	Semifinals	Final / BM	Rank
Athlete	Event	Score	Seed	Opposition Score	Opposition Score	Opposition Score	Opposition Score	Opposition Score	Rank
Youssof Tolba	Boys' Individual	670	11	Aoshima (JPN); W 6–5	Ovchynnikov (UKR); L 5–6	did not advance			9
Nada Amr Said Mohamed Azzam	Girls' Individual	658	9	Hnin (MYA); L 5–6	did not advance				17

Team

Athletes	Event	Ranking round		Round of 32	Round of 16	Quarterfinals	Semifinals	Final / BM	Rank
Athletes	Event	Score	Seed	Opposition Score	Opposition Score	Opposition Score	Opposition Score	Opposition Score	Rank
Youssof Tolba (EGY); Laura Paeglis (AUS)	Mixed team	1299	17	Giannasio (ARG); Soithong (THA); L 2–6	did not advance				17
Nada Amr Said Mohamed Azzam (EGY); Matthias Potrafke (GER)	Mixed team	1309	1	Zhang (CHN); Tura (SMR); W 5–1	Giannasio (ARG); Soithong (THA); L 4–5	did not advance			9

== Athletics ==
Egypt won a silver medal from the women's hammer event.

Silver	Rawan Ayman Bakarat	Athletics	Women's Hammer	October 15

== Badminton ==
Egypt qualified one player based on the Badminton Junior World Rankings.

Singles

Athlete	Event	Group stage				Quarterfinal	Semifinal	Final / BM	Rank
Athlete	Event	Opposition Score	Opposition Score	Opposition Score	Rank	Opposition Score	Opposition Score	Opposition Score	Rank
Mohamed Mostafa Kamel	Boys' singles	Lakshya Sen (IND); L 0–2	Danylo Bosniuk (UKR); L 0–2	Fabricio Farias (BRA); L 0–2	4	Did not advance			9

Team

Athlete	Event	Group stage				Quarterfinal	Semifinal	Final / BM	Rank
Athlete	Event	Opposition Score	Opposition Score	Opposition Score	Rank	Opposition Score	Opposition Score	Opposition Score	Rank
Team Theta; Mohamed Mostafa Kamel (EGY); Julien Carraggi (BEL); Kodai Naraoka (JPN); Lukas Resch (GER); Zecily Fung (AUS); Jaqueline Lima (BRA); Hirari Mizui (JPN); Tereza Švábíková (CZE)	Mixed Teams	Sigma (MIX); L (100–110)	Omega (MIX); L (100–110)	Gamma (MIX); L (107–110)	4Q	Delta (MIX); W (110–93)	Alpha (MIX); L (90–110)	Zeta (MIX); W (110–107)	3rd place, bronze medalist(s)

== Basketball ==
Egypt qualified a girls' team based on the U18 3x3 National Federation Ranking.

Event	Group stage					Quarterfinal	Semifinal	Final / BM	
Event	Opposition Score	Opposition Score	Opposition Score	Opposition Score	Rank	Opposition Score	Opposition Score	Opposition Score	Rank
Girls' tournament	Sri Lanka; L 15–17	Ukraine; L 6–21	United States; L 4–21	Venezuela; W 16–15	5	did not advance			18

Shoot-out contest

Athlete	Event	Qualification		Final					
Athlete	Event	Points	Rank	Round 1	Round 2	Round 3	Round 4	Total	Rank
Nouran Khaled Abdelrafea Ibrahim	Shoot-out contest	4	16	did not advance					
Enas Tawheed	Shoot-out contest	3	24	did not advance					

== Beach volleyball ==
Athletes	Event	Preliminary round		Round of 24	Round of 16	Quarterfinals	Semifinals	Final / BM	
Athletes	Event	Opposition Score	Rank	Opposition Score	Opposition Score	Opposition Score	Opposition Score	Opposition Score	Rank
Nada Hamdy Samir; Nariman Yasser Elsayed	Girls'	Gierczynska–Jundzill (POL); L 0–2; Sh. T. Cao–J. J. Zeng (CHN); L 0–2; Alvarado–Juarez (GUA); L 0–2	25	did not advance					

== Boxing ==
Boys

Athlete	Event	Preliminary R1	Preliminary R2	Semifinals	Final / RM	Rank
Athlete	Event	Opposition Result	Opposition Result	Opposition Result	Opposition Result	Rank
Marwan Mamdouh	-60 kg	Bye	Murdoch-McKeich (NZL); W 5–0	Bondarchuk (UKR); L 0–5	Safarov (AZE); L 0-4	4
Youssef Ali Karar	-81 kg	Bye	Morales (PUR); W 5–0	Itauma (GBR); L 0–5	Merjanov (UZB); L 0–5	4
Ahmed Elsawy	+91 kg	Dennis (AUS); W RSC R1 1:27	—N/a	Dronov (RUS); L 0–5	Chuol (CAN); W 5–0	3rd place, bronze medalist(s)

== Cycling ==
Egypt qualified a girls' combined team based on its ranking in the Youth Olympic Games Junior Nation Rankings.

- Girls' combined team - 1 team of 2 athletes

Combined team

Athlete	Event	Time trial			Road race			Cross-country Eliminator		Cross-country Short circuit		Criterium		Total points	Rank
Athlete	Event	Time	Rank	Points	Time	Rank	Points	Rank	Points	Rank	Points	Rank	Points	Total points	Rank
Salma Salah Eldin	Girls' combined team	11:28.24	19	0	DNF		0	37	0	18	0	DNF	0	3	18
Sohaila Youssuf	Girls' combined team	11:28.24	19	0	1:42:19	14	3	4	0	19	0	DNF	0	3	18

== Equestrian ==
Egypt qualified a rider based on its ranking in the FEI World Jumping Challenge Rankings.

- Individual Jumping – 1 athlete

Athlete	Horse	Event	Round 1		Round 2			Total	
Athlete	Horse	Event	Penalties	Rank	Penalties	Total	Rank	Penalties	Rank
Ahmed Nasser Elnaggar	Jos Africa de Parco	Individual Jumping	8	21	0	8	14	8	14
Africa; Margaux Koenig (MRI); Anna Bunty Howard (ZAM); Brianagh Lindsay Clark (ZIM); Ahmed Nasser Elnaggar (EGY); Hannah Ivy Garton (RSA)	BM Urlefe; Call Girl Z El Roblecito Malaika; Jos Africa de Parco; Jos Cassius	Team Jumping	(4); 1; 0 (8); 0	4	(4); 0; 0 (4); 0	1	1	1	3rd place, bronze medalist(s)

== Fencing ==
Egypt qualified five athletes based on its performance at the 2018 Cadet World Championship.

Bronze	Mazen Elaraby	Fencing	Boys' Sabre	October 7

- Boys' Épée – Mohamed Elsayed
- Boys' Foil – Loaay Marouf
- Boys' Sabre – Mazen Elaraby
- Girls' Épée – Mariam Amer
- Girls' Foil – Noha Hany

Boys

Athlete	Event	Pool round	Round of 16	Quarterfinals	Semifinals	Final / BM	
Athlete	Event	Opposition Score	Opposition Score	Opposition Score	Opposition Score	Opposition Score	Rank
Mohamed Elsayed	Épée	Biro (AUT) L 3–5; Herbst (USA) W 5–3; Li (CHN) W 4–3; Di Veroli (ITA) L 3–5	—N/a	Tolasov (RUS); W 15–8	Di Veroli (ITA); L 9–15	Baudunov (KGZ); L 13–14	4
Loaay Marouf	Foil	Lim (SGP) L 2–5; Cervantes (MEX) L 1–5; Bem (POL) L 4–5; Winterberg-Poulsen (DEN) L 0–5; Chan (HKG) L 2–5	Macchi (ITA); L 9–15	did not advance			
Mazen Elaraby	Sabre	Coly (SEN) W 5–0; Vidovszky (USA) L 2–5; Hyun (KOR) L 1–5; Mahbas (IRQ) W 5–1; Heathcock (GER) L 2–5; Rabb (HUN) L 1–5; Shaker (IRI) W 5–2	Macchi (ITA); L 9–15	Santana (PUR) W 15–14	Rabb (HUN) L 6–15	Vidovszky (USA) W 15–10	3rd place, bronze medalist(s)

Girls

Athlete	Event	Pool round	Round of 16	Quarterfinals	Semifinals	Final / BM	
Athlete	Event	Opposition Score	Opposition Score	Opposition Score	Opposition Score	Opposition Score	Rank
Mariam Amer	Épée	Chorniy (UKR) L 1–5; Dyner Villa (CRC) W 5–3; Lim (KOR) L 1–5; Wasiak (BEL) L 2–5; Hsieh (HKG) L 1–5; Bieleszova (CZE) L 1–5	Wasiak (BEL) L 10–15	did not advance			
Noha Hany	Foil	Ko (HKG) L 3–5; Salmas (AUS) W 5–2; Acurero Gonzalez (VEN) L 3–5; Thepaut (FRA) L 2–5; Ueno (JPN) L 1–5; Candescu (ROU) L 4–5	Candescu (ROU) W 15–11	Tieu (USA) L 3–15	did not advance		

Mixed team

Athletes	Event	Round of 16	Quarterfinals	Semifinals / PM	Final / PM	Rank
Athletes	Event	Opposition Score	Opposition Score	Opposition Score	Opposition Score	Rank
Africa; Mazen Elaraby (EGY); Chaima Benadouda (ALG); Loaay Marouf (EGY); Noha Hany (EGY); Mohamed Elsayed (EGY); Yousra Zeboudj (ALG)	Mixed Team	Europe 1 L 18–30	Did not advance	Americas 2 L 15–30	Did not advance	8

== Futsal ==
Egypt qualified to the futsal competition as African representative after its boys' team beat Angola in the final of the African qualifications.

=== Group A ===
Egypt topped their group after drawing with Argentina and winning against Panama, Iraq and Slovakia.

Pos	Team	Pld	W	D	L	GF	GA	GD	Pts	Qualification
1	Egypt	4	3	1	0	15	8	+7	10	Semi-finals
2	Argentina (H)	4	2	1	1	19	8	+11	7	Semi-finals
3	Iraq	4	2	1	1	12	5	+7	7	
4	Slovakia	4	1	0	3	5	12	−7	3	
5	Panama	4	0	1	3	7	25	−18	1	

Source: FIFA IOC
(H) Hosts
7 October 2018
20:00

Argentina	2–2	Egypt
De Candia 37'; Hernández 39'	Report (FIFA); Report (IOC) Category:Futsal at the 2018 Summer Youth Olympics – Boys First Round – ARG-EGY on Wikimedia Commons	Morsy 12'; El-Sayed 17'

Tecnópolis
Attendance: 6,150
Referee: Miguel Oliveira (Portugal)
9 October 2018
20:00

Egypt	8–3	Panama
El-Sayed 5', 16', 27'; Talaat 15'; Mohsen 25', 32'; Morsy 28'; Abdelmagid 38'	Report (FIFA); Report (IOC)	Arévalo 20', 21'; Victoria 35'

Tecnópolis
Attendance: 1,200
Referee: Hussain Al-Bahhar (Bahrain)
10 October 2018
20:00

Iraq	2–3	Egypt
Faeq 21'; Sabri 32'	Report (FIFA); Report (IOC)	El-Sayed 7'; Mohsen 10', 33'

Tecnópolis
Attendance: 850
Referee: Diego Molina (Costa Rica)
13 October 2018
20:00

Panama	2–12	Argentina
Ogilvie 4'; Agrazal 19'	Report (FIFA); Report (IOC)	Gassman 5', 10', 13', 19', 23', 25'; Rufino 11'; Ramírez 16', 26'; Raggiati 34'; Hernández 36'; De Candia 40' (pen.)

Tecnópolis
Attendance: 6,500
Referee: Khalid Hnich (Morocco)

=== Semifinal ===
15 October 2018
18:00

Egypt	1–3	Russia
El-Sayed 10'	Report (FIFA); Report (IOC) Category:Futsal at the 2018 Summer Youth Olympics – Boys Semifinals – EGY-RUS on Wikimedia Commons	Cherniavskii 3'; Okulov 4'; Karpiuk 20'

Tecnópolis
Attendance: 6,500
Referee: Khalid Hnich (Morocco)

=== Bronze medal match ===
18 October 2018
10:30

Argentina	4–5	Egypt
Ramírez 1', 10'; Raggiati 4'; De Candia 40'	Report (FIFA); Report (IOC) Category:Futsal at the 2018 Summer Youth Olympics – Boys Bronze medal match on Wikimedia Commons	Talaat 16', 21', 31', 39'; Ahmed 20'

Tecnópolis
Attendance: 4,800
Referee: David Urdánoz (Spain)

After losing the semifinal against Russia, Egypt was able to secure the bronze metal after staging a remarkable comeback against the hosts.

== Gymnastics ==
=== Artistic ===
Egypt qualified two gymnasts based on its performance at the 2018 African Junior Championship.

- Boys' artistic individual all-around – 1 quota
- Girls' artistic individual all-around – 1 quota

Boys

Athlete	Event	Qualification						Final	
Athlete	Event	Apparatus						Total	Rank
Athlete	Event	F	PH	R	V	PB	HB	Total	Rank
Mohamed Afify	All-Around	10.766	11.600	12.433	13.078	11.733	11.966	71.576	

Girls

Athlete	Event	Qualification				Final	
Athlete	Event	Apparatus				Total	Rank
Athlete	Event	V	UB	BB	F	Total	Rank
Zeina Ibrahim	All-Around	12.866	10.966	11.266	11.966	42.983	18

=== Rhythmic ===
Egypt qualified one gymnast based on its performance at the 2018 African Junior Championship.

- Girls' rhythmic individual all-around – 1 quota

Individual

Athlete	Event	Qualification						Final					
Athlete	Event	Hoop	Ball	Clubs	Ribbon	Total	Rank	Hoop	Ball	Clubs	Ribbon	Total	Rank
Tia Sobhy	Individual	11.250	10.650	11.550	10.050	43.500	33	did not advance					

=== Multidiscipline ===
Team	Athlete	Acrobatic	Artistic	Rhythmic	Trampoline	Total points	Rank
Team Max Whitlock (Green)	Madalena Cavilhas (POR); Manuel Candeias (POR)	20	—N/a			349	2nd place, silver medalist(s)
Team Max Whitlock (Green)	Fernando Espíndola (ARG)	—N/a	43	—N/a		349	2nd place, silver medalist(s)
Team Max Whitlock (Green)	Takeru Kitazono (JPN)	—N/a	17	—N/a		349	2nd place, silver medalist(s)
Team Max Whitlock (Green)	Pablo Calvache (ECU)	—N/a	59	—N/a		349	2nd place, silver medalist(s)
Team Max Whitlock (Green)	Camila Montoya (CRC)	—N/a	69	—N/a		349	2nd place, silver medalist(s)
Team Max Whitlock (Green)	Ksenia Klimenko (RUS)	—N/a	11	—N/a		349	2nd place, silver medalist(s)
Team Max Whitlock (Green)	Zeina Ibrahim (EGY)	—N/a	15	—N/a		349	2nd place, silver medalist(s)
Team Max Whitlock (Green)	Rayna Khai Ling Hoh (MAS)	—N/a		18	—N/a	349	2nd place, silver medalist(s)
Team Max Whitlock (Green)	Roza Abitova (KAZ)	—N/a		26	—N/a	349	2nd place, silver medalist(s)
Team Max Whitlock (Green)	Adelina Beljajeva (EST)	—N/a		47	—N/a	349	2nd place, silver medalist(s)
Team Max Whitlock (Green)	Robert Vilarasau (ESP)	—N/a			11	349	2nd place, silver medalist(s)
Team Max Whitlock (Green)	Jessica Clarke (GBR)	—N/a			13	349	2nd place, silver medalist(s)
Team Oksana Chusovitina (Black)	Viktoryia Akhotnikava (BLR); Ilya Famenkou (BLR)	12	—N/a			352	3rd place, bronze medalist(s)
Team Oksana Chusovitina (Black)	Brandon Briones (USA)	—N/a	32	—N/a		352	3rd place, bronze medalist(s)
Team Oksana Chusovitina (Black)	Adam Tobin (GBR)	—N/a	45	—N/a		352	3rd place, bronze medalist(s)
Team Oksana Chusovitina (Black)	Mohamed Afify (EGY)	—N/a	–	—N/a		352	3rd place, bronze medalist(s)
Team Oksana Chusovitina (Black)	Indira Ulmasova (UZB)	—N/a	52	—N/a		352	3rd place, bronze medalist(s)
Team Oksana Chusovitina (Black)	Karla Pérez (GUA)	—N/a	35	—N/a		352	3rd place, bronze medalist(s)
Team Oksana Chusovitina (Black)	Tonya Paulsson (SWE)	—N/a	38	—N/a		352	3rd place, bronze medalist(s)
Team Oksana Chusovitina (Black)	Lidiia Iakovleva (AUS)	—N/a		35	—N/a	352	3rd place, bronze medalist(s)
Team Oksana Chusovitina (Black)	Aino Yamada (JPN)	—N/a		31	—N/a	352	3rd place, bronze medalist(s)
Team Oksana Chusovitina (Black)	Lilly Rotärmel (GER)	—N/a		34	—N/a	352	3rd place, bronze medalist(s)
Team Oksana Chusovitina (Black)	Santiago Escallier (ARG)	—N/a			21	352	3rd place, bronze medalist(s)
Team Oksana Chusovitina (Black)	Antonia Sakellaridou (GRE)	—N/a			17	352	3rd place, bronze medalist(s)
Team Rosie MacLennan (Light Blue)	Noa Kazado Yakar (ISR); Yonatan Fridman (ISR)	9	—N/a			441	11
Team Rosie MacLennan (Light Blue)	Sam Dick (NZL)	—N/a	79	—N/a		441	11
Team Rosie MacLennan (Light Blue)	Gabriel Burtănete (ROU)	—N/a	14	—N/a		441	11
Team Rosie MacLennan (Light Blue)	Yin Dehang (CHN)	—N/a	32	—N/a		441	11
Team Rosie MacLennan (Light Blue)	Emma Spence (CAN)	—N/a	26	—N/a		441	11
Team Rosie MacLennan (Light Blue)	Nazlı Savranbaşı (TUR)	—N/a	57	—N/a		441	11
Team Rosie MacLennan (Light Blue)	Sofia Nair (ALG)	—N/a	22	—N/a		441	11
Team Rosie MacLennan (Light Blue)	Tia Sobhy (EGY)	—N/a		99	—N/a	441	11
Team Rosie MacLennan (Light Blue)	Azra Dewan (RSA)	—N/a		93	—N/a	441	11
Team Rosie MacLennan (Light Blue)	Lina Wahada (TUN)	—N/a		-	—N/a	441	11
Team Rosie MacLennan (Light Blue)	Benny Wizani (AUT)	—N/a			8	441	11
Team Rosie MacLennan (Light Blue)	Yuki Okuno (JPN)	—N/a			10	441	11

== Judo ==
Individual

Athlete	Event	Round of 16	Quarterfinals	Semifinals	Rep 1	Rep 2	Rep 3	Final / BM	Rank
Athlete	Event	Opposition Result	Opposition Result	Opposition Result	Opposition Result	Opposition Result	Opposition Result	Opposition Result	Rank
Ahmed Mohamed Fahmy	Boys' -81 kg	Rebahi (ALG); L 0s3-11s1	did not advance		—N/a	Paez (VEN); W 011-001	—N/a	Did not advance	9
Alaa Mousaad Mohamed	Girls' -78 kg	Lobnik (SLO); L 0s2-10s2	did not advance		—N/a	Ramirez (DOM); W 10–0	Lobnik (SLO); L 0s2-10	Did not advance	7

Team

Athletes	Event	Round of 16	Quarterfinals	Semifinals	Final	Rank
Athletes	Event	Opposition Result	Opposition Result	Opposition Result	Opposition Result	Rank
Team Nanjing; Eva Pérez Soler (ESP); Nilufar Ermaganbetova (UZB); Hasret Bozkurt (TUR); Alaa Mousaad Mohamed (EGY); Romain Valadier-Picard (FRA); Vugar Talibov (AZE); Rihari Iki (NZL); Joaquin Burgos (ARG)	Mixed Team	—N/a	Team Beijing (MIX); L 3–4	did not advance		
Team Singapore; Ahad Al-Sagheer (YEM); Anastasia Balaban (UKR); Bryan Garboa (ECU); Sarah Kafufula (COD); Mariem Khlifi (TUN); Ahmed Mohamed Fahmy (EGY); Eduarda Rosa (BRA); Ilia Sulamanidze (GEO)	Mixed Team	Team Moscow (MIX); L 3–4	did not advance			

== Karate ==
Egypt qualified one athlete based on its performance at one of the Karate Qualification Tournaments.

- Girls' −53kg – Yasmin Nasr El-Gewily

Athlete	Event	Elimination round				Semifinals	Final	
Athlete	Event	Opposition Score	Opposition Score	Opposition Score	Rank	Opposition Score	Opposition Score	Rank
Yasmin Nasr Elgewily	Girls' -53 kg	Valdes (CHI); W 7–0	Ocak (TUR); W 2–1	Alikulova (UZB); T 0–0	1	Khonakdartarsi (IRI); W 5–0	Tahata (JPN); W 2–1	1st place, gold medalist(s)

== Modern pentathlon ==
Egypt qualified two athletes based on its performance at the 2018 Youth A World Championship.

- Boys' Individual – Ahmed El Gendy
- Girls' Individual – Salma Abdelmaksoud

Individual

Athlete	Event	Fencing Ranking round (épée one touch)			Swimming (200 m freestyle)			Fencing Bonus round (épée one touch)		Combined: Shooting / Running (10 m air pistol) / (3200 m)			Total points	Final rank
Athlete	Event	Results	Rank	Points	Time	Rank	Points	Results	Points	Time	Rank	Points	Total points	Final rank
Ahmed Elgendy	Boys' Individual	18-5	2	266	2:01.95	2	307	2-0	2	11:36.77	6	604	1179	1st place, gold medalist(s)
Salma Abdelmaksoud	Girls' Individual	13–10	6	226	2:13.87	2	283	2-0	2	12:24.86	1	556	1067	1st place, gold medalist(s)

Mixed team

Athlete	Event	Fencing Ranking round (épée one touch)			Swimming (200 m freestyle)			Fencing Bonus round (épée one touch)		Combined: Shooting / Running (10 m air pistol) / (3200 m)			Total points	Final rank
Athlete	Event	Results	Rank	Points	Time	Rank	Points	Results	Points	Time	Rank	Points	Total points	Final rank
Ahmed Elgendy; Yewen Gu (CHN)	Mixed relay	19-3; 14-8	1	260	2:01.72	5	307	2–0	2	11:41.43	6	599	1168	1st place, gold medalist(s)
Salma Abdelmaksoud; Franco Serrano (ARG)	Mixed relay	15–7; 15–7	3	245	2:00.31	2	310	2–0	2	11:41.37	5	599	1156	2nd place, silver medalist(s)

== Rowing ==
Athlete	Event	Round 1		Round 2		Round 3		Total			Quarterfinals		Semifinals		Final	
Athlete	Event	Time	Rank	Time	Points	Time	Points	Time	Points	Rank	Time	Rank	Time	Rank	Time	Rank
Mostafa Ahmed Mohamed; Omar Hamdy Ibrahim	Boys' pair	3:37.18	12	1:38.45	2	1:38.63	2	3:17.08	4	11 FC	—N/a				1:34.68	2
Dareen Mahmoud Mohamed	Girls' single sculls	4:13.37	19	1:59.92	3	1:58.31	2	3:58.23	5	19 SE/F	—N/a		1:50.14	1 FE	1:49.85	1

Qualification Legend: FA=Final A (medal); FB=Final B (non-medal); FC=Final C (non-medal); FD=Final D (non-medal); FE=Final E (non-medal); FF=Final F (non-medal); SA/B=Semifinals A/B; SC/D=Semifinals C/D; SE/F=Semifinals E/F; QF=Quarterfinals;

== Sailing ==
Egypt qualified two boats based on its performance at the African Techno 293+ Youth Olympic Games Qualifier.

- Boys' Techno 293+ – 1 boat
- Girls' Techno 293+ – 1 boat

Athlete	Event	Race													Net points	Final rank
Athlete	Event	1	2	3	4	5	6	7	8	9	10	11	12	M*	Net points	Final rank
Moamen Maarouf Rabia Sowilam	Boys' Techno 293+	15	18	17	20	CAN	15	14	12	23	23	DNF	UDF	22	179	22
Salma Wael Ibrahim	Girls' Techno 293+	22	23	DNF	19	CAN	23	20	UDF	23	22	DNF	STP	22	174	23

== Shooting ==
Egypt qualified two sport shooters based on its performance at the 2017 African Championships.

- Boys' 10m Air Pistol – 1 quota
- Girls' 10m Air Rifle – 1 quota

Individual

Athlete	Event	Qualification		Final	
Athlete	Event	Points	Rank	Points	Rank
Omar Abdelfatah	Boys' 10m Air Pistol	549	17	did not advance	
Farida Darwish	Girls' 10m Air Rifle	612.1	16	did not advance	

Team

Athletes	Event	Qualification		Round of 16	Quarterfinals	Semifinals	Final / BM	Rank
Athletes	Event	Points	Rank	Opposition Result	Opposition Result	Opposition Result	Opposition Result	Rank
Farida Darwish (EGY); Alex Chresten Hoberg (AUS)	Mixed 10 metre air rifle	825.9	5	Benetti (ITA); Mahardika (INA); L 6-10	Did not advance			
Kanyakorn Hirunphoem (THA); Omar Abdelfatah (EGY)	Mixed 10 metre air pistol	740-16x	12Q	Bhaker (IND); Fayzullaev (TJK); L 4-10	Did not advance			17

== Swimming ==
Egypt qualified 4 competitors for the games.

Boys

Athlete	Event	Heat		Semifinal		Final	
Athlete	Event	Time	Rank	Time	Rank	Time	Rank
Abdelrahman Sameh	50 m freestyle	22.60	1 Q	22.48	2 Q	22.43	3rd place, bronze medalist(s)
Abdelrahman Sameh	50 m butterfly	24.45	12 Q	24.15	6 Q	24.07	6
Mohamed Ahmed Mohamed	100 m butterfly	56.66	34	did not advance			
Mohamed Ahmed Mohamed	200 m butterfly	2:05.79	26	did not advance			

Girls

Athlete	Event	Heat		Semifinal		Final	
Athlete	Event	Time	Rank	Time	Rank	Time	Rank
Enjy Mohamed Abouzaid	50 m freestyle	27.12	26	did not advance			
Enjy Mohamed Abouzaid	100 m freestyle	58.86	35	did not advance			
Sandy Atef	400 m freestyle	4:30.88	24	did not advance			
Sandy Atef	800 m freestyle	9:16.73	19	did not advance			

== Table tennis ==
Egypt qualified two table tennis players based on its performance at the African Continental Qualifier.

- Boys' singles – Youssef Abdel-Aziz
- Girls' singles – Marwa Alhodaby

Singles

Athlete	Event	Group stage		Round of 16	Quarterfinals	Semifinals	Final / BM	
Athlete	Event	Opposition Score	Rank	Opposition Score	Opposition Score	Opposition Score	Opposition Score	Rank
Youssef Abdel-Aziz	Boys' singles	Yu (AZE) W 4–1; Pletea (ROU) L 0–4; Xu (NZL) W 4–1	2	Moregard (SWE) L 2–4	did not advance			
Marwa Alhodaby	Girls' singles	Vovk (SLO) L 2–4; Kamath (IND) L 0–4; Goi (SGP) L 3–4	4	did not advance				

Mixed team

Athlete	Event	Group stage		Round of 16	Quarterfinals	Semifinals	Final / BM	
Athlete	Event	Opposition Score	Rank	Opposition Score	Opposition Score	Opposition Score	Opposition Score	Rank
Youssef Abdel-Aziz; Marwa Alhodaby	Mixed team	Team Europe (MIX) W 2–1; Brazil (BRA) L 0–3; Malaysia (MAS) W 2–1	3	did not advance				

== Taekwondo ==
Athlete	Event	Round of 16	Quarterfinals	Semifinals	Final	
Athlete	Event	Opposition Result	Opposition Result	Opposition Result	Opposition Result	Rank
Abdelrahman Mohamed Khalaf	Boys +73 kg	—N/a	Abdul Rahimzai (AFG); L 25–29	did not advance		
Eyad Adel Mahmoud	Boys −73 kg	Bye	Sofotasios (GRE); W 29–5	Achab (BEL); L 4–8	Did not advance	3rd place, bronze medalist(s)
Maya Magdy Mahmoud Badawy	Girls −55 kg	Bye	Leite Macedo (BRA); L 3–23	did not advance		

== Triathlon ==
Egypt qualified two athletes based on its performance at the 2018 African Youth Olympic Games Qualifier.

Individual

Athlete	Event	Swim (750m)	Trans 1	Bike (20 km)	Trans 2	Run (5 km)	Total Time	Rank
Mohamed Tarek	Boys	10:28	0:34	29:34	0:29	18:37	59:42	27
Maram Yasseer Mohamed	Girls	12:26	0:54	—N/a			LAP	NM

Relay

Athlete	Event	Total Times per Athlete (Swim 250m, Bike 6.6 km, Run 1.8 km)	Total Group Time	Rank
World Team 1 Lo Ho Yan (HKG); Mohamed Tarek (EGY); Maram Yasseer Mohamed (EGY); Zakaria Alkharrat (SYR)	Mixed Relay	24:35 (16); 23:16 (13); 27:07 (14); 24:40 (14)	1:39:38	14

== Weightlifting ==
Egypt qualified two athletes based on its performance at the 2018 African Youth Championships.

Athlete	Event	Snatch		Clean & jerk		Total	Rank
Athlete	Event	Result	Rank	Result	Rank	Total	Rank
Abdalla Galal Mohamed Mostafa	Boys' 77 kg	125	2	170	1	295	3rd place, bronze medalist(s)
Neama Said Fahmi Said	Girls' 58 kg	87	2	107	2	194	2nd place, silver medalist(s)

== Wrestling ==
Egypt qualified five wrestlers based on its performance at the 2018 African Cadet Championships.

Bronze	Ahmed Mahmoud Khalil	Wrestling	Boys' 110 kg	October 14

Key:
- VFA – Victory by Fall
- VSU – Without any points scored by the opponent
- VSU1 – With point(s) scored by the opponent
- VPO – Without any points scored by the opponent
- VPO1 – With point(s) scored by the opponent

Boys

Athlete	Event	Group stage			Final / RM	Rank
Athlete	Event	Opposition Score	Opposition Score	Rank	Opposition Score	Rank
Abdalla Mohamed Shaaban Shaaban	Greco-Roman −45kg	Nazaryan (BUL); L 5 – 14 ^{VSU1}	Dehbozorgi (IRI); L 0 – 10 ^{VSU}	3 Q	de Jesús (HON); W 12 – 1 ^{VFA}	5
Shady Elkhalil Ibrahim Wehib	Greco-Roman −92kg	Ayaydın (TUR); L 1 – 2 ^{VPO1}	Bartley (ASA); W 8 – 0 ^{VSU}	2 Q	Evloev (RUS); L 2 – 11 ^{VSU1}	4
Fathi Tarek Fathi Attia Ismail	freestyle −65kg	Karimi (IRI); L 5 – 6 ^{VPO1}	Manville (USA); L 3 – 12 ^{VPO1}	3 Q	Ainsley (NZL); W 7 – 0 ^{VPO}	5
Ahmed Mahmoud Elsayed Khalil	freestyle −110kg	Barns (AUS); W 10 – 0 ^{VSU}	Zare (IRI); L 0 – 11 ^{VSU}	2 Q	Orozco (MEX); W 6 – 2 ^{VPO1}	3rd place, bronze medalist(s)

Girls

Athlete	Event	Group stage					Final / RM	Rank
Athlete	Event	Opposition Score	Opposition Score	Opposition Score	Opposition Score	Rank	Opposition Score	Rank
Sara Gouda Farouk Mahmoud	freestyle −43kg	Batbaatar (MGL); L 4 – 2 ^{VFA}	Derry (NZL); W WO	Simran (IND); L 2 – 14 ^{VSU1}	Leorda (MDA); L 1 – 8 ^{VPO1}	4 Q	Martinez (BRA); W 10 – 0 ^{VSU}	7
Hala Wael Imbabi Ahmed	freestyle −57kg	Blayvas (GER); L 0 – 4 ^{VPO}	López (MEX); L 2 – 8 ^{VPO1}	Ozaki (JPN); L 0 – 10 ^{VSU}	Quintanilla (GUM); W 12 – 2 ^{VSU1}	4 Q	Mansi (IND); W 4 – 0 ^{VFA}	7
