= Fencing at the 2018 Summer Youth Olympics =

Fencing at the III Summer Youth Olympic Games
- Venue: Africa Pavilion
- Dates: 7–10 October
- No. of events: 7 (3 boys, 3 girls, 1 mixed)
- Competitors: 78 from 41 nations

Fencing events at the 2018 Summer Youth Olympics were held from 7 to 10 October at the Africa Pavilion in Buenos Aires, Argentina.

== Qualification ==
Each National Olympic Committee (NOC) can enter a maximum of 6 competitors, 3 per each gender and 1 per each weapon. 66 places was decided at the 2018 Cadet World Championships held in Verona, Italy from 1–9 April 2018. Ten athletes per each individual event (1 from Africa, 2 from the Americas, 3 from Asia/Oceania and 4 from Europe) qualified. Furthermore, the top six ranked individual athletes that have not qualified overall across all genders will also qualify, with a maximum one per event per NOC (2 from Oceania and 1 from the other four continents). As hosts, Argentina is able to enter athletes in all six events and a further three wildcards were awarded per gender. These were awarded to: Costa Rica, Lebanon, Togo, Saudi Arabia, Iraq and Senegal.

To be eligible to participate at the Youth Olympics athletes must have been born between 1 January 2000 and 31 December 2003.

| NOC | Boys | | | Girls | | | Total |
| NOC | Épée | Foil | Sabre | Épée | Foil | Sabre | Total |
|---|---|---|---|---|---|---|---|
| Algeria | | | | X | | X | 2 |
| Argentina | X | ~~X~~ | X | ~~X~~ | ~~X~~ | ~~X~~ | 2 |
| Australia | | X | | | X | | 2 |
| Austria | X | | | | | | 1 |
| Belgium | | | | X | | X | 2 |
| Bulgaria | | | | | | X | 1 |
| Canada | X | | | X | X | | 3 |
| China | X | ~~X~~ | ~~X~~ | | X | X | 3 |
| Costa Rica | | | | X | | | 1 |
| Czech Republic | | | | X | | | 1 |
| Denmark | | X | | | | | 1 |
| Egypt | X | X | X | X | X | | 5 |
| France | | X | X | | X | | 3 |
| Germany | X | | X | | | | 2 |
| Hong Kong | | X | | X | X | X | 4 |
| Hungary | | | X | X | X | X | 4 |
| Iran | | | X | | | | 1 |
| Iraq | | | X | | | | 1 |
| Italy | X | X | | ~~X~~ | X | ~~X~~ | 3 |
| Japan | X | | X | | X | | 3 |
| Kazakhstan | | | | X | | | 1 |
| Kyrgyzstan | X | | | | | | 1 |
| Lebanon | | | | X | | | 1 |
| Mexico | | X | | | | X | 2 |
| Philippines | | X | | | | | 1 |
| Poland | | X | | | X | | 2 |
| Portugal | | X | | | | | 1 |
| Puerto Rico | | | X | | | | 1 |
| Romania | | | X | | X | | 2 |
| Russia | X | | | X | | X | 3 |
| Saudi Arabia | | | X | | | | 1 |
| Singapore | | X | | | | | 1 |
| Senegal | | | X | | | | 1 |
| South Korea | | ~~X~~ | X | X | | X | 3 |
| Spain | | | X | | | | 1 |
| Chinese Taipei | | X | | | | | 1 |
| Togo | | | | | X | | 1 |
| Turkey | | | | | | X | 1 |
| Ukraine | | | | X | | | 1 |
| United States | X | X | X | X | X | X | 6 |
| Venezuela | | | | | X | | 1 |
| 41 NOCs | 11 | 13 | 15 | 14 | 14 | 11 | 78 |

== Medal summary ==
=== Medal table ===
| Rank | Nation | Gold | Silver | Bronze | Total |
|---|---|---|---|---|---|
| 1 | Hungary | 2 | 0 | 0 | 2 |
| – | Mixed-NOCs | 1 | 1 | 1 | 3 |
| 2 | Italy | 1 | 1 | 0 | 2 |
| 3 | France | 1 | 0 | 0 | 1 |
| 3 | Japan | 1 | 0 | 0 | 1 |
| 3 | Ukraine | 1 | 0 | 0 | 1 |
| 6 | South Korea | 0 | 1 | 1 | 2 |
| 6 | United States | 0 | 1 | 1 | 2 |
| 8 | Germany | 0 | 1 | 0 | 1 |
| 8 | Hong Kong | 0 | 1 | 0 | 1 |
| 8 | Mexico | 0 | 1 | 0 | 1 |
| 11 | Czech Republic | 0 | 0 | 1 | 1 |
| 11 | Denmark | 0 | 0 | 1 | 1 |
| 11 | Egypt | 0 | 0 | 1 | 1 |
| 11 | Kyrgyzstan | 0 | 0 | 1 | 1 |
| Totals (14 entries) | | 7 | 7 | 7 | 21 |

=== Events ===
| Event | Gold | Silver | Bronze |
|---|---|---|---|
| Boys' Épée | Davide Di Veroli; Italy | Paul Veltrup; Germany | Khasan Baudunov; Kyrgyzstan |
| Boys' Foil | Armand Spichiger; France | Kenji Bravo; United States | Jonas Winterberg-Poulsen; Denmark |
| Boys' Sabre | Krisztián Rabb; Hungary | Hyun Jun; South Korea | Mazen Elaraby; Egypt |
| Girls' Épée | Kateryna Chorniy; Ukraine | Kaylin Hsieh; Hong Kong | Veronika Bieleszová; Czech Republic |
| Girls' Foil | Yuka Ueno; Japan | Martina Favaretto; Italy | May Tieu; United States |
| Girls' Sabre | Liza Pusztai; Hungary | Natalia Botello; Mexico | Lee Ju-eun; South Korea |
| Mixed Team Event | Europe 1 Kateryna Chorniy (UKR); Martina Favaretto (ITA); Liza Pusztai (HUN); Davide Di Veroli (ITA); Armand Spichiger (FRA); Krisztián Rabb (HUN) | Asia-Oceania 1 Kaylin Hsieh (HKG); Yuka Ueno (JPN); Lee Ju-eun (KOR); Khasan Baudunov (KGZ); Chen Yi-tung (TPE); Hyun Jun (KOR) | Americas 1 Emily Vermeule (USA); May Tieu (USA); Natalia Botello (MEX); Isaac Herbst (USA); Kenji Bravo (USA); Robert Vidovszky (USA) |
