= Fencing at the 2018 Summer Youth Olympics – Boys' sabre =

Boys' sabre at the III Summer Youth Olympic Games
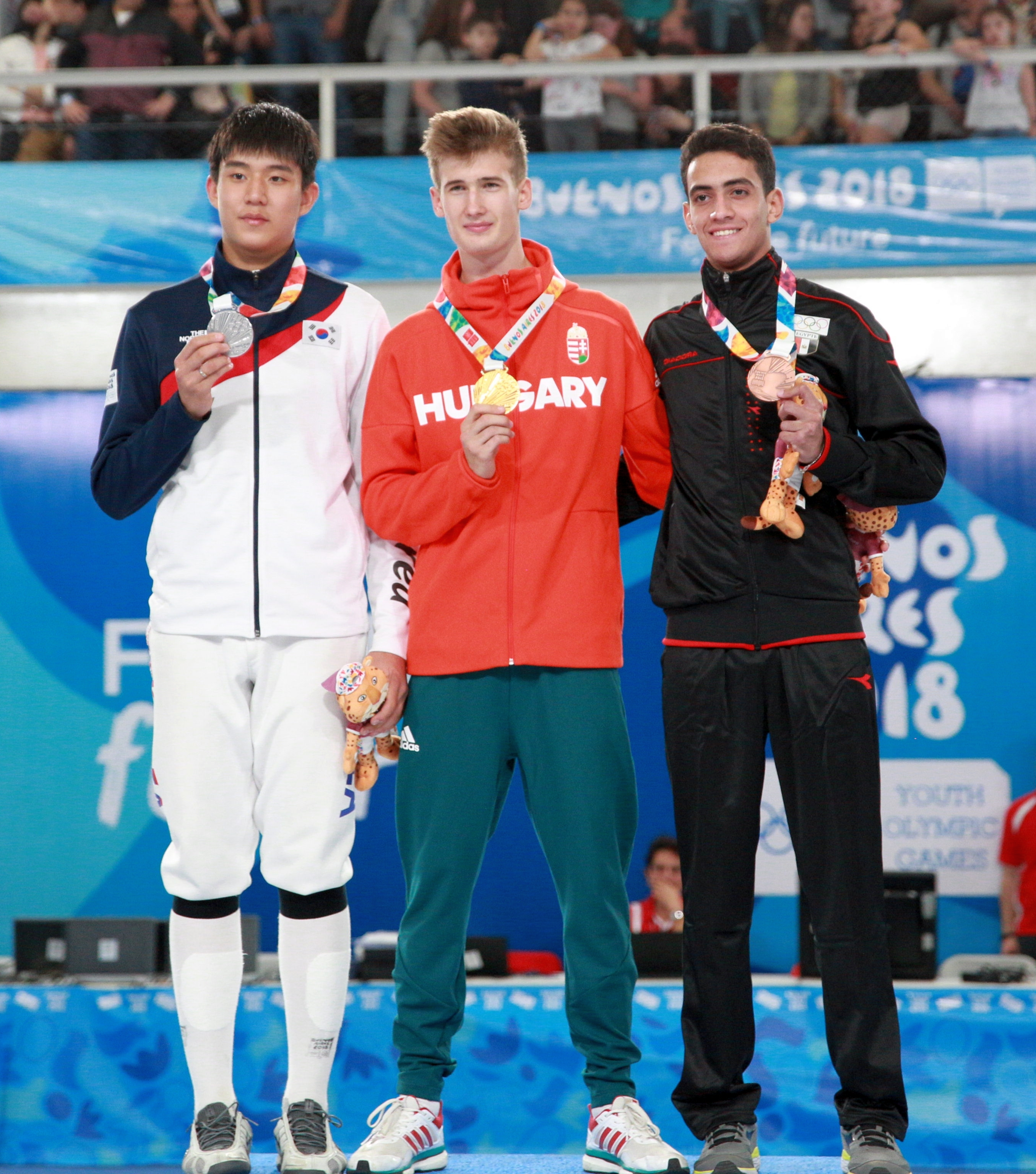
- Boys' sabre medal ceremony
- Venue: Africa Pavilion
- Dates: 7 October
- Competitors: 15 from 15 nations

Medalists
1st place, gold medalist(s)		Krisztián Rabb	Hungary
2nd place, silver medalist(s)		Hyun Jun	South Korea
3rd place, bronze medalist(s)		Mazen Elaraby	Egypt

The boys' sabre competition at the 2018 Summer Youth Olympics was held at the Africa Pavilion in Argentina on 7 October.

== Results ==
=== Pool Round ===
==== Pool 1 ====
Rank	Athlete	(Puerto Rico)	(Romania)	(Saudi Arabia)	(Argentina)	(Spain)	(Japan)	(France)	V#	B#	Ind.	HG	HR	Diff.
3	Hudson Santana (PUR)		V	V	2	2	V	3	3	6	0.500	22	23	−1
6	Andrei Păștin (ROU)	3		V	V	0	1	3	2	6	0.333	17	25	−8
7	Ali Al-Bahrani (KSA)	1	2		2	2	V	2	1	6	0.167	14	29	−15
5	Matias Ríos (ARG)	V	3	V		3	1	2	2	6	0.333	19	24	−5
2	Alonso Santamaría (ESP)	V	V	V	V		V	0	5	6	0.833	25	15	+10
4	Hibiki Kato (JPN)	4	V	4	V	3		1	2	6	0.333	22	22	0
1	Samuel Jarry (FRA)	V	V	V	V	V	V		6	6	1.000	30	11	+19

==== Pool 2 ====
Rank	Athlete	(United States)	(Egypt)	(Senegal)	(Iraq)	(South Korea)	(Hungary)	(Iran)	(Germany)	V#	B#	Ind.	HG	HR	Diff.
4	Robert Vidovszky (USA)		V	V	V	4	V	4	3	4	7	0.571	31	23	+8
6	Mazen Elaraby (EGY)	2		V	V	1	1	V	2	3	7	0.429	21	23	−2
8	Moustapha Coly (SEN)	1	0		0	0	1	0	0	0	7	0.000	2	35	−33
7	Mahdi Mahbas (IRQ)	2	1	V		0	3	3	1	1	7	0.143	15	30	−15
1	Hyun Jun (KOR)	V	V	V	V		2	V	V	6	7	0.857	32	16	+16
3	Krisztián Rabb (HUN)	3	V	V	V	V		0	V	5	7	0.714	28	21	+7
5	Amirhossein Shaker (IRI)	V	2	V	V	2	V		4	4	7	0.571	28	22	+6
2	Antonio Heathcock (GER)	V	V	V	V	4	4	V		5	7	0.714	33	20	+13

=== Bracket ===
Round of 16
1
16
9	Mazen Elaraby (EGY)	15
8	Hudson Santana (PUR)	14
5	Krisztián Rabb (HUN)	15
12	Andrei Păștin (ROU)	8
13	Ali Al-Bahrani (KSA)	9
4	Antonio Heathcock (GER)	15
3	Alonso Santamaría (ESP)	15
14	Mahdi Mahbas (IRQ)	9
11	Matias Ríos (ARG)	10
6	Robert Vidovszky (USA)	15
7	Amirhossein Shaker (IRI)	9
10	Hibiki Kato (JPN)	15
15	Moustapha Coly (SEN)	DNF
2	Hyun Jun (KOR)

Quarterfinals
1	Samuel Jarry (FRA)	14
9	Mazen Elaraby (EGY)	15
5	Krisztián Rabb (HUN)	15
4	Antonio Heathcock (GER)	11
3	Alonso Santamaría (ESP)	13
6	Robert Vidovszky (USA)	15
10	Hibiki Kato (JPN)	12
2	Hyun Jun (KOR)	15

Semifinals
9	Mazen Elaraby (EGY)	6
5	Krisztián Rabb (HUN)	15
6	Robert Vidovszky (USA)	14
2	Hyun Jun (KOR)	15

Final
5	Krisztián Rabb (HUN)	15
2	Hyun Jun (KOR)	13
Third place
9	Mazen Elaraby (EGY)	15
6	Robert Vidovszky (USA)	10

== Final standings ==
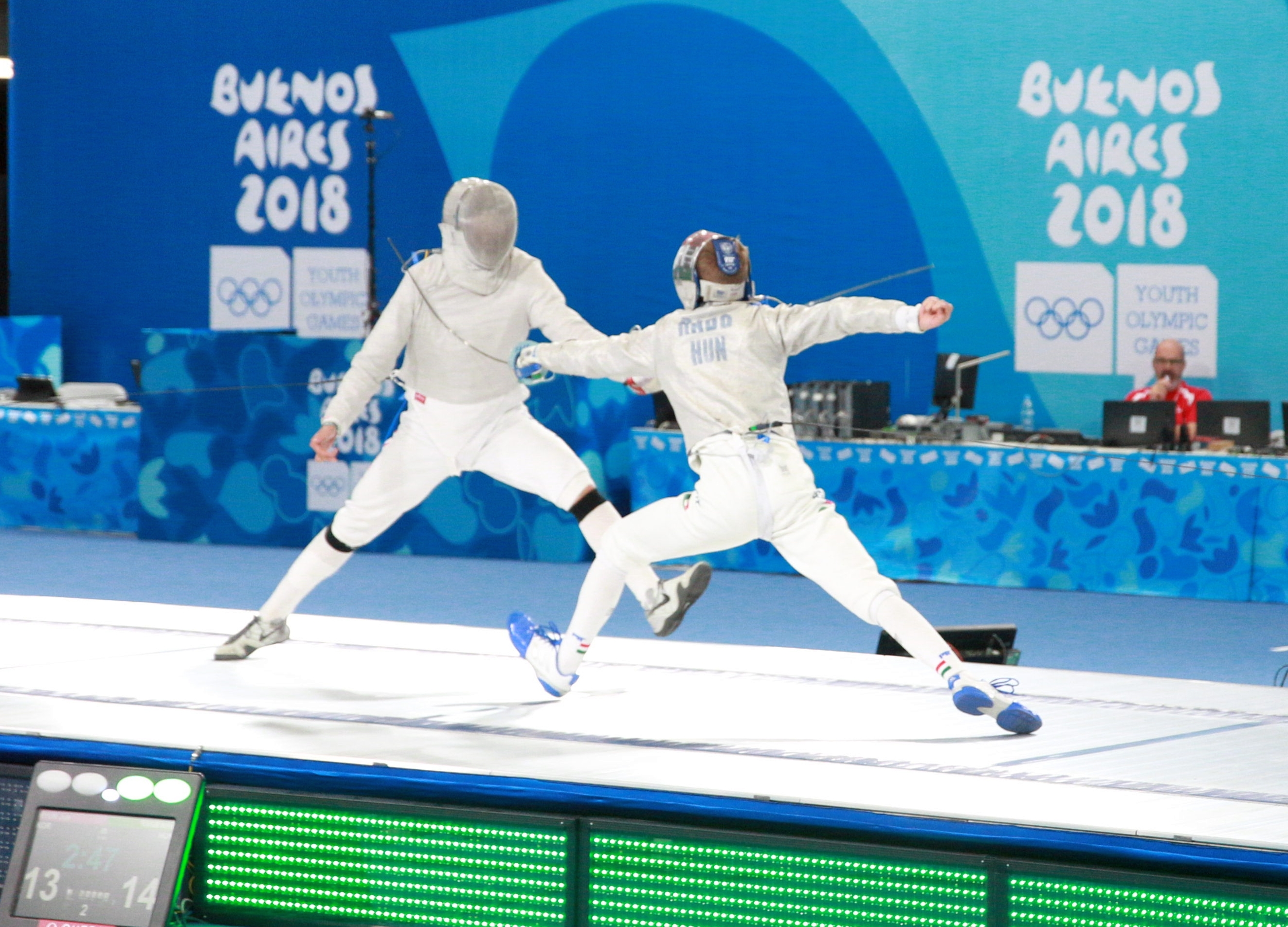
Krisztián Rabb (right) set the final hit against Hyun Jun (left) in the final match

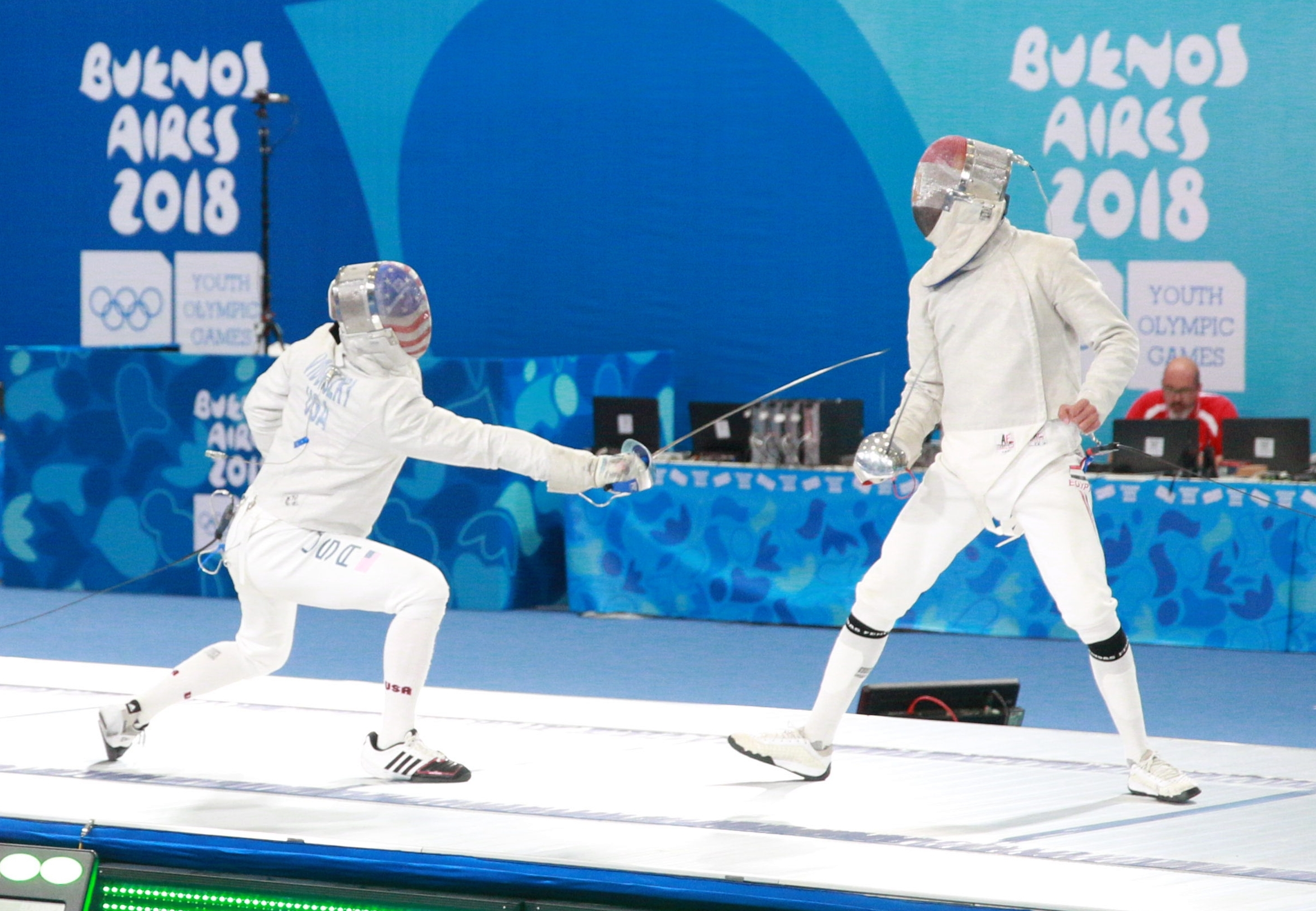
Mazen Elaraby (right) and Robert Vidovszky (left) fighting for bronze

Rank	Athlete
1st place, gold medalist(s)	Krisztián Rabb (HUN)
2nd place, silver medalist(s)	Hyun Jun (KOR)
3rd place, bronze medalist(s)	Mazen Elaraby (EGY)
4	Robert Vidovszky (USA)
5	Samuel Jarry (FRA)
6	Alonso Santamaría (ESP)
7	Antonio Heathcock (GER)
8	Hibiki Kato (JPN)
9	Amirhossein Shaker (IRI)
10	Hudson Santana (PUR)
11	Matias Ríos (ARG)
12	Andrei Păștin (ROU)
13	Ali Al-Bahrani (KSA)
14	Mahdi Mahbas (IRQ)
15	Moustapha Coly (SEN)
