= Kyrgyzstan at the 2018 Summer Youth Olympics =

- IOC code: KGZ
- NOC: National Olympic Committee of the Republic of Kyrgyzstan
- Website: http://www.olympic.kg/

in Buenos Aires, Argentina 6 – 18 October 2018
- Competitors: 13 in 7 sports
- Medals Ranked 67th: Gold 0 Silver 2 Bronze 1 Total 3

Summer Youth Olympics appearances (overview)
- 2010; 2014; 2018

Kyrgyzstan participated at the 2018 Summer Youth Olympics in Buenos Aires, Argentina from 6 October to 18 October 2018.

== Medalists ==
Medal	Name	Sport	Event	Date
Silver	Denis Petrashov	Swimming	Boys' 100 m breaststroke	8 October
Silver	Khasan Baudunov	Fencing	Mixed team (in mixed-NOC team with Team Asia-Oceania 1)	10 October
Silver	Elmirbek Sadyrov	Wrestling	Boys' Greco-Roman 60 kg	12 October
Bronze	Khasan Baudunov	Fencing	Boys' épée	8 October
Bronze	Sultan Zhenishbekov	Judo	Mixed team (in mixed-NOC team with Team Rio de Janeiro)	10 October

== Athletics ==
Girls
Track & road events

Athlete	Event	Stage 1			Stage 2			Final placing	
Athlete	Event	Heat	Result	Rank	Heat	Result	Rank	Result	Rank
Eva Kadyrova	200 m	2	25.95	17	1	25.75	18	51.70	17

== Basketball ==
Kyrgyzstan qualified a boys' team based on the U18 3x3 National Federation Ranking.

- Boys' tournament – 1 team of 4 athletes

Event	Group stage					Quarterfinal	Semifinal	Final / BM
Event	Opposition Score	Opposition Score	Opposition Score	Opposition Score	Rank	Opposition Score	Opposition Score	Opposition Score
Boys' tournament	Belgium; L 11–21	Kazakhstan; L 13–21	Latvia; L 12–15	Italy; L 6–21	5	did not advance		

Dunk contest

Athlete	Event	Qualification				Semifinal				Final				
Athlete	Event	Round 1	Round 2	Total	Rank	Round 1	Round 2	Total	Rank	Round 1	Round 2	Round 3	Total	Rank
Denis Gerashchenko	Dunk contest	DNS				did not advance								

== Fencing ==
Kyrgyzstan qualified one athlete based on its performance at the 2018 Cadet World Championship.

Boy's

Athlete	Event	Pool Stages			Round of 16	Quarter-final	Semi-final	Final / BM / Pl.	Standing
Athlete	Event	Opposition Score	Win–loss (%)	Rank	Opposition Score	Opposition Score	Opposition Score	Opposition Score	Standing
Khasan Baudunov	Boys' épée	Pool 2 Hsieh Jarov (CAN): L 3–5; Asami (JPN): W 4–3; Pérez Contreras (ARG): W 5–3; Tolasov (RUS): L 4–5; Veltrup (GER): W 5–2	3–2 (.600)	3 Q	Bye	Asami (JPN); W 15–9	Veltrup (GER); L 12–15	Elsayed (EGY); W 14–13	3rd place, bronze medalist(s)

Mixed team

== Judo ==
Boy's

Athlete	Event	Round of 32	Round of 16	Quarterfinal	Semifinal	Repechage	Final	Rank
Athlete	Event	Opposition Result	Opposition Result	Opposition Result	Opposition Result	Opposition Result	Opposition Result	Rank
Sultan Zhenishbekov	66 kg	Bye	Sulaimoni (TJK); L 000–100	Repechage; Santos (BRA); L 000–100	did not advance			17

Girl's

Athlete	Event	Round of 16	Quarterfinal	Semifinal	Repechage	Final	Rank
Athlete	Event	Opposition Result	Opposition Result	Opposition Result	Opposition Result	Opposition Result	Rank
Shakhida Narmukhamedova	78 kg	Liu (TPE); L 0s1–100	Repechage; Pretorius (ZIM); L 0s1–100	did not advance			13

== Swimming ==
Boys

Athlete	Event	Heats		Semifinals		Final	
Athlete	Event	Time	Rank	Time	Rank	Time	Rank
Denis Petrashov	50 m breaststroke	28.43	4	28.62	8	28.79	7
Denis Petrashov	100 m breaststroke	1:02.82	8	1:01.95	3	1:01.34	2nd place, silver medalist(s)
Denis Petrashov	200 m breaststroke	2:16.70	9	Did not advance			
Vladislav Shuliko	100 m butterfly	56.03	31	Did not advance			

== Weightlifting ==
Kyrgyzstan qualified one athlete based on its performance at the 2018 Asian Youth Championships. But they didn't participated that.

- ~~Boys' events – 1 quota~~ (not used)

== Wrestling ==
Boy's Greco-Roman

Athlete	Event	Group Stages		Final / BM / Pl.	
Athlete	Event	Opposition Score	Standing	Opposition Score	Rank
Elmirbek Sadyrov	60 kg	Group A Kellner (NZL): W 9–0; Ugalde (MEX): W 9–6	1 Q	Chkhikvadze (GEO); L 0–9	2nd place, silver medalist(s)
