= Fencing at the 2018 Summer Youth Olympics – Boys' épée =

Boys' épée at the III Summer Youth Olympic Games
- Venue: Africa Pavilion
- Dates: 8 October
- Competitors: 11 from 11 nations

Medalists
1st place, gold medalist(s)		Davide Di Veroli	Italy
2nd place, silver medalist(s)		Paul Veltrup	Germany
3rd place, bronze medalist(s)		Khasan Baudunov	Kyrgyzstan

The boys' épée competition at the 2018 Summer Youth Olympics was held at the Africa Pavilion in Argentina on 8 October.

== Results ==
=== Pool Round ===
==== Pool 1 ====
Rank	Athlete	(China)	(Italy)	(Austria)	(Egypt)	(United States)	V#	B#	Ind.	HG	HR	Diff.
5	Li Zhiwei (CHN)		2	V	3	3	1	4	0.250	13	17	−4
3	Davide Di Veroli (ITA)	V		4	3	V	2	4	0.500	17	14	+3
1	Alexander Biro (AUT)	3	V		V	V	3	4	0.750	18	16	+2
2	Mohamed Elsayed (EGY)	V4	V4	3		V	3	4	0.750	16	14	+2
4	Isaac Herbst (USA)	V	3	4	3		1	4	0.250	15	18	−3

==== Pool 2 ====
Rank	Athlete	(Russia)	(Germany)	(Argentina)	(Japan)	(Kyrgyzstan)	(Canada)	V#	B#	Ind.	HG	HR	Diff.
4	Artur Tolasov (RUS)		3	V	1	V	V	3	5	0.600	19	16	+3
1	Paul Veltrup (GER)	V4		V	V	2	V	4	5	0.800	21	17	+4
6	Ignacio Pérez Contreras (ARG)	1	3		1	3	1	0	5	0.000	9	25	−16
2	Seiya Asami (JPN)	V	2	V		3	V	3	5	0.600	20	14	+6
3	Khasan Baudunov (KGZ)	4	V	V	V4		3	3	5	0.600	21	18	+3
5	Seraphim Hsieh Jarov (CAN)	2	4	V	3	V		2	5	0.400	19	19	0

=== Bracket ===
Round of 16
1
16
9	Isaac Herbst (USA)	15
8	Seraphim Hsieh Jarov (CAN)	13
5
12
13
4
3
14
11	Ignacio Pérez Contreras (ARG)	4
6	Artur Tolasov (RUS)	15
7	Davide Di Veroli (ITA)	15
10	Li Zhiwei (CHN)	5
15
2

Quarterfinals
1	Paul Veltrup (GER)	13
9	Isaac Herbst (USA)	12
5	Khasan Baudunov (KGZ)	15
4	Seiya Asami (JPN)	9
3	Mohamed Elsayed (EGY)	15
6	Artur Tolasov (RUS)	8
7	Davide Di Veroli (ITA)	15
2	Alexander Biro (AUT)	13

Semifinals
1	Paul Veltrup (GER)	15
5	Khasan Baudunov (KGZ)	12
3	Mohamed Elsayed (EGY)	9
7	Davide Di Veroli (ITA)	15

Final
1	Paul Veltrup (GER)	4
7	Davide Di Veroli (ITA)	11
Third place
5	Khasan Baudunov (KGZ)	14
3	Mohamed Elsayed (EGY)	13

== Final standings ==
Rank	Athlete
1st place, gold medalist(s)	Davide Di Veroli (ITA)
2nd place, silver medalist(s)	Paul Veltrup (GER)
3rd place, bronze medalist(s)	Khasan Baudunov (KGZ)
4	Mohamed Elsayed (EGY)
5	Alexander Biro (AUT)
6	Seiya Asami (JPN)
7	Artur Tolasov (RUS)
8	Isaac Herbst (USA)
9	Seraphim Hsieh Jarov (CAN)
10	Li Zhiwei (CHN)
11	Ignacio Pérez Contreras (ARG)
