= Judo at the 2018 Summer Youth Olympics – Girls' 78 kg =

Judo competition

Girls' 78 kg at the III Summer Youth Olympic Games
- Venue: Parque Polideportivo Roca
- Date: October 9
- Competitors: 13 from 13 nations

Medalists
1st place, gold medalist(s)		Raffaela Igl	Germany
2nd place, silver medalist(s)		Margarita Gritsenko	Kazakhstan
3rd place, bronze medalist(s)		Eduarda Rosa	Brazil
3rd place, bronze medalist(s)		Metka Lobnik	Slovenia

The Girls' 78 kg competition at the 2018 Summer Youth Olympics was held on 9 October, at the Asia Pavilion.

== Schedule ==
All times are in local time (UTC-3).

Date	Time	Round
Sunday, 9 October 2018	10:00; 11:00; 11:00; 12:00; 15:00	Round of 16; Quarterfinals; Repechage Rounds; Semifinals; Finals

== Results ==
Legend

- 1st number — Ippon
- 2nd number — Waza-ari
- H — Hansuke-make
- s — Shido

=== Main Bracket ===
Round of 16
Tiguidanke Camara (GUI)	00
Edith Ortiz (ECU)	10
Christi-Rose Pretorius (ZIM)	00s1
Ester Svobodová (CZE)	10
Liu Li-ling (TPE)	10
Shakhida Narmukhamedova (KGZ)	00s1
Maral Mardani (IRI)	00
Omaria Ramírez (DOM)	10
Metka Lobnik (SLO)	10s2
Alaa Mousaad Mohamed (EGY)	00s2

Quarterfinals
Margarita Gritsenko (KAZ)	10
Edith Ortiz (ECU)	00
Ester Svobodová (CZE)	10
Liu Li-ling (TPE)	00
Eduarda Rosa (BRA)	01
Omaria Ramírez (DOM)	00s2
Raffaela Igl (GER)	10
Metka Lobnik (SLO)	00s1

Semifinals
Margarita Gritsenko (KAZ)	11s1
Ester Svobodová (CZE)	00
Eduarda Rosa (BRA)	00s3
Raffaela Igl (GER)	10s2

Finals
Margarita Gritsenko (KAZ)	00
Raffaela Igl (GER)	11s1

=== Repechage ===
Repechage 1
Christi-Rose Pretorius (ZIM)	10
Shakhida Narmukhamedova (KGZ)	00s1

Repechage 2
Tiguidanke Camara (GUI)	00
Liu Li-ling (TPE)	10
Christi-Rose Pretorius (ZIM)	00
Edith Ortiz (ECU)	11
Maral Mardani (IRI)	00
Metka Lobnik (SLO)	10
Alaa Mousaad Mohamed (EGY)	10
Omaria Ramírez (DOM)	00

Repechage 3
Liu Li-ling (TPE)	00s2
Edith Ortiz (ECU)	10
Metka Lobnik (SLO)	10
Alaa Mousaad Mohamed (EGY)	00s2

Bronze Medal Finals
Edith Ortiz (ECU)	00H
Eduarda Rosa (BRA)	10s2
Metka Lobnik (SLO)	10
Ester Svobodová (CZE)	00s1
