= Paul Veltrup =

German fencer (born 2001)

Personal information
- Nationality: German
- Born: 6 March 2001 (age 25) Grefrath, Germany
- Home town: Grefrath, Germany
- Height: 1.91 m (6 ft 3 in)
- Weight: 75 kg (165 lb)

Fencing career
- Sport: Fencing
- Weapon: Épée
- Hand: left-handed
- Club: Fecht Club Krefeld
- Head coach: Lajos Csire
- FIE ranking: current ranking
Medal record
Youth Olympic Games
| Silver medal – second place | 2018 Buenos Aires | Individual |
European Junior Championships
| Silver medal – second place | 2018 Sochi | Cadets Team |
| Bronze medal – third place | 2018 Sochi | Cadets Individual |

Paul Veltrup (born March 6, 2001, in Grefrath, Germany) is a German fencer who fences for the Fecht Club Krefeld. At the Youth Olympic Games 2018 in Buenos Aires he won the silver medal in boy's épée.

== Career ==
=== National Championships ===
Veltrup won the German Championships in 2016 (cadets) and 2018 (juniors).

=== European Championships ===
- 2016 (Novi Sad, Serbia): 10th place (cadets team), 65th place (cadets individual)
- 2017 (Plovdiv, Bulgaria): 6th place (cadets team), 39th place (cadets individual)
- 2018 (Sochi, Russia): 2nd place (cadets team), 3rd place (cadets individual), 11th place (juniors individual), 11th place (juniors team)

=== World Championships ===
- 2016 (Bourges, France): 31st place (cadets individual)
- 2017 (Plovdiv, Bulgaria): 57th place (cadets individual)
- 2018 (Verona, Italy): 9th place (cadets individual), 16th place (juniors team), 54th place (juniors individual)

=== Youth Olympic Games ===
Veltrup started at the Youth Olympics in Buenos Aires in the individual competition in épée on October 8, 2018. He was first after the pool round. In the quarter-finals, he won against Isaac Herbst (USA) 13:12, in the semi-final against Kyrgyz Khasan Baudunov 15:12. The final lost Veltrup with 4:11 against World and European champion Davide Di Veroli from Italy. His silver medal was the first for the German team at the Youth Olympics.

Two days after Veltrup won the silver medal in the individual competition, he started for the team Europe 2 in the mixed team competition and took the 6th place.
