= Alina Kornelli =

German-Austrian Formula Kite competitor, sailor and snowboarder

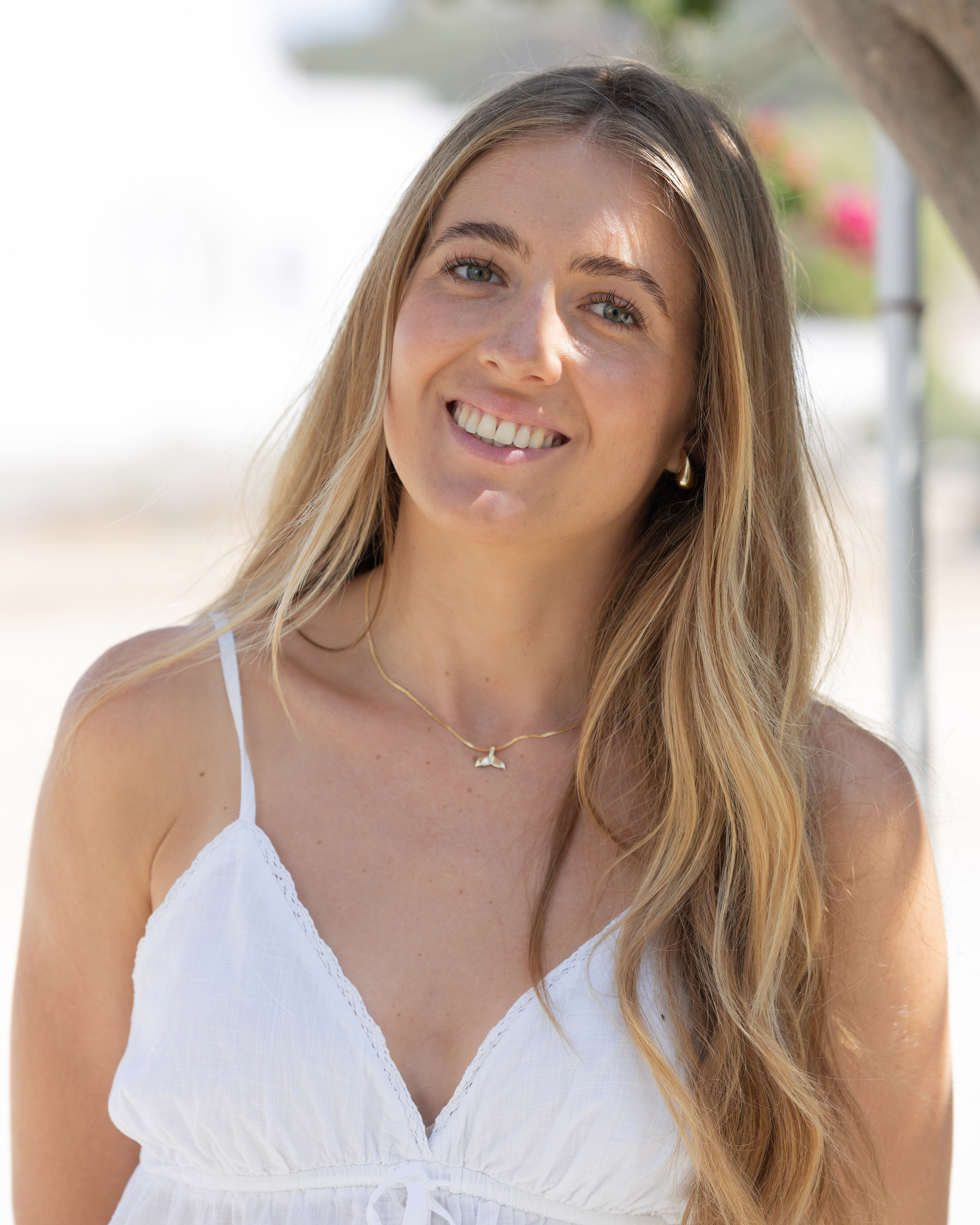
- Born: 12 May 2000 (age 26); Munich, Germany
- Occupation: Professional athlete
- Known for: Sailor, snowboarder and Formula Kite

Alina Kornelli (born 12 May 2000) is a German and Austrian Formula Kite competitor. She has been a sailor and a snowboarder.

== Life ==
Kornelli was born in Munich in 2000 with dual Austrian/German nationality. Her supportive parents are Sabine, an Austrian from Sankt Georgen an der Gusen, and her father, a German windsurfer named Dietmar "Didi" Kornelli. Her elder brother Julian Kornelli became an ice hockey player in Germany.

She was also active as a snowboarder in the Bavarian snowboard squad. In 2015 she became the German youth champion in the snowboard cross competition and later the Bavarian champion twice. She gave up snowboarding in 2017 - said she preferred water to snow because the water was better to fall on.

=== Germany ===
Kornelli has been kiteboarding since she was eleven years old. In 2017 she became vice- European champion in slalom at the European Championships in Gizzeria, Italy . At the 2018 Summer Youth Olympics she competed for Germany in the IKA Twin Tip Racing discipline and finished fourth. In 2019 she was living in Reichersbeurer. she won the overall slalom at the Kitesurf Masters and became German champion, and she won bronze in freestyle and surprised herself with another in Formula Kite racing.

=== Austria ===
In 2021 she changed her allegiance to the Austrian Sailing Association. In 2023, she became a member of the Kammersee Sailing Club with her sailing based on Lake Attersee. In September 2023, she finished sixth at the European Championships off Portsmouth in England. At the Olympic Last Chance Regatta at the end of April 2024 off Hyères in France she qualified to take part in the 2024 Summer Olympics in Paris. The last five places were awarded at the Last Chance Regatta to the Swiss surfer Elena Lengwiler, Julia Damasiewicz of Poland, the Turkish Derin Atakan, Mafalda Pires de Lima of Portugal and Kornelli.

In the World Championship in Hyère, her sailing was at times competitive, but inconsistency gave her a position of 17th. Kornelli was chosen as the 2024 Austrian Olympic competitor.
