= Lilly Rotärmel =

German rhythmic gymnast

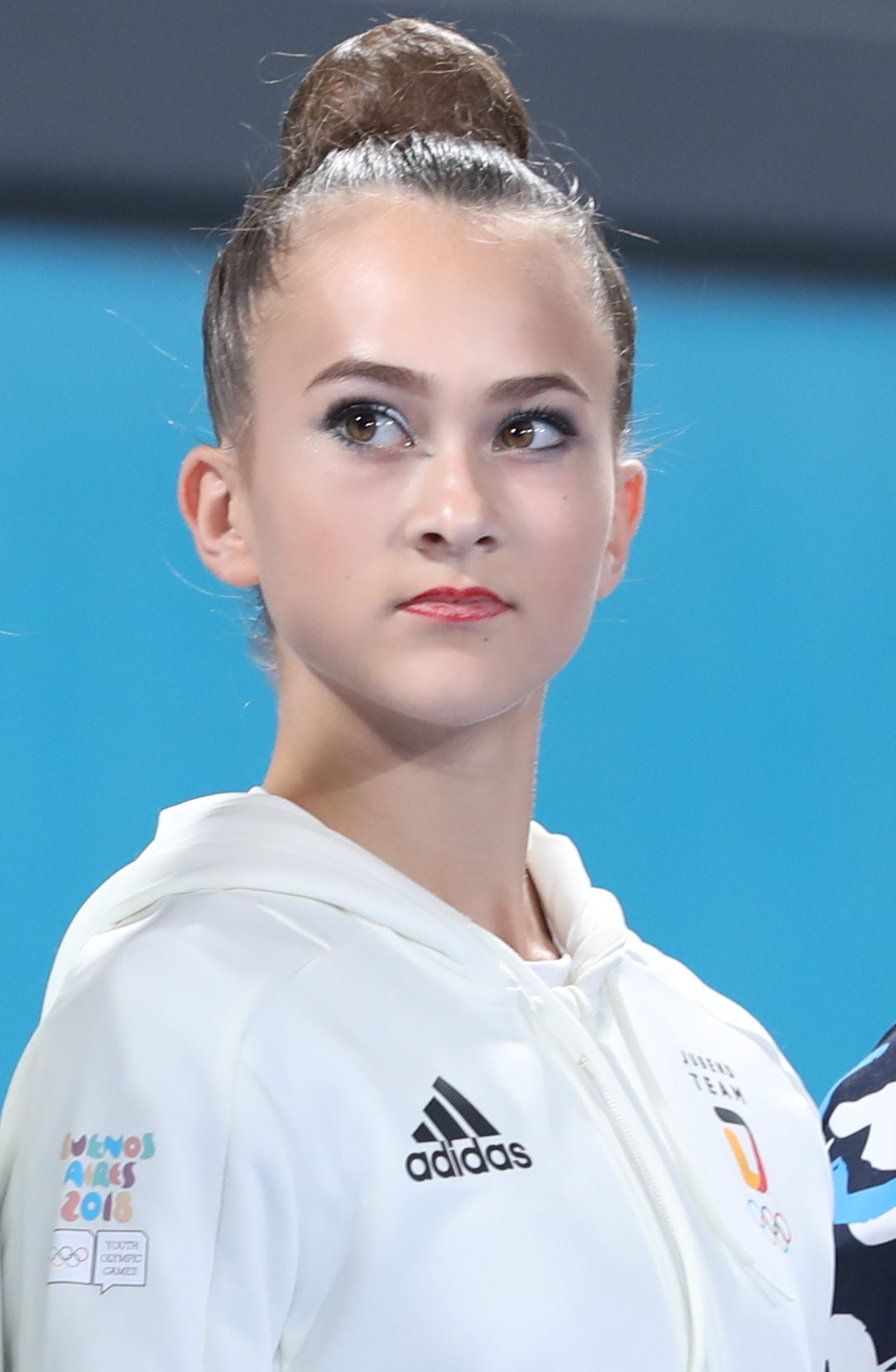

Personal information
- Born: 15 February 2003 (age 23) Berlin, Germany
- Height: 157 cm (5 ft 2 in)

Gymnastics career
- Discipline: Rhythmic gymnastics
- Country represented: Germany (2017-2020)
- Club: 1. VfL Fortuna Marzahn
- Head coach: Anzhelika Lepekha
Medal record
Women's rhythmic gymnastics
Representing Germany
Youth Olympic Games
Bronze medal – third place	2018 Buenos Aires	Mixed team

Lilly Rotärmel (born 15 February 2003) is a former German rhythmic gymnast. She represented Germany at the 2018 Youth Olympics, winning bronze in mixed NOCS.

== Personal life ==
Lilly was a pupil at the Olympiapark Sportschule.

== Career ==
At age 10 she placed 13th nationally. In 2016 she was the national runner up in hoop and bronze medalist in the All-Around and with the ball in the under 13 category. She won gold with clubs and ribbon as well as silver in the All-Around, with hoop and ball at the 2017 under 14 national championships in Berlin.

In 2018 she took part in the selection for the Youth Olympics in Moscow along with Emeli Erbes who earned Germany a spot in the competition, finishing 34th. In May she won silver in the All-Around, with hoop, with ball and with clubs and bronze with ribbon at the under 15 national championships. In October it was announced she was to replace Erbes at the YOG as Emeli got injured. She then went on to compete at the Youth Olympic Games in Buenos Aires, finishing 27th in qualification and did not advance to the final, but she won bronze as part of team Oksana Chusovitina.

She became a senior in 2019, competing in the Bundesliga for BSP Berlin along Caroline Gruschwitz, Anja Kosan, Isabel Waibel, Angelina Suchara, Neele Arndt, Oana Bran, Katharina Fedorov, Aldana Palacin and Francine Schöning.

In January 2020 she competed at the Berlin Team Masters and took 6th place in all event finals. She retired shortly after.
