= Krisztián Rabb =

Hungarian fencer (born 2001)

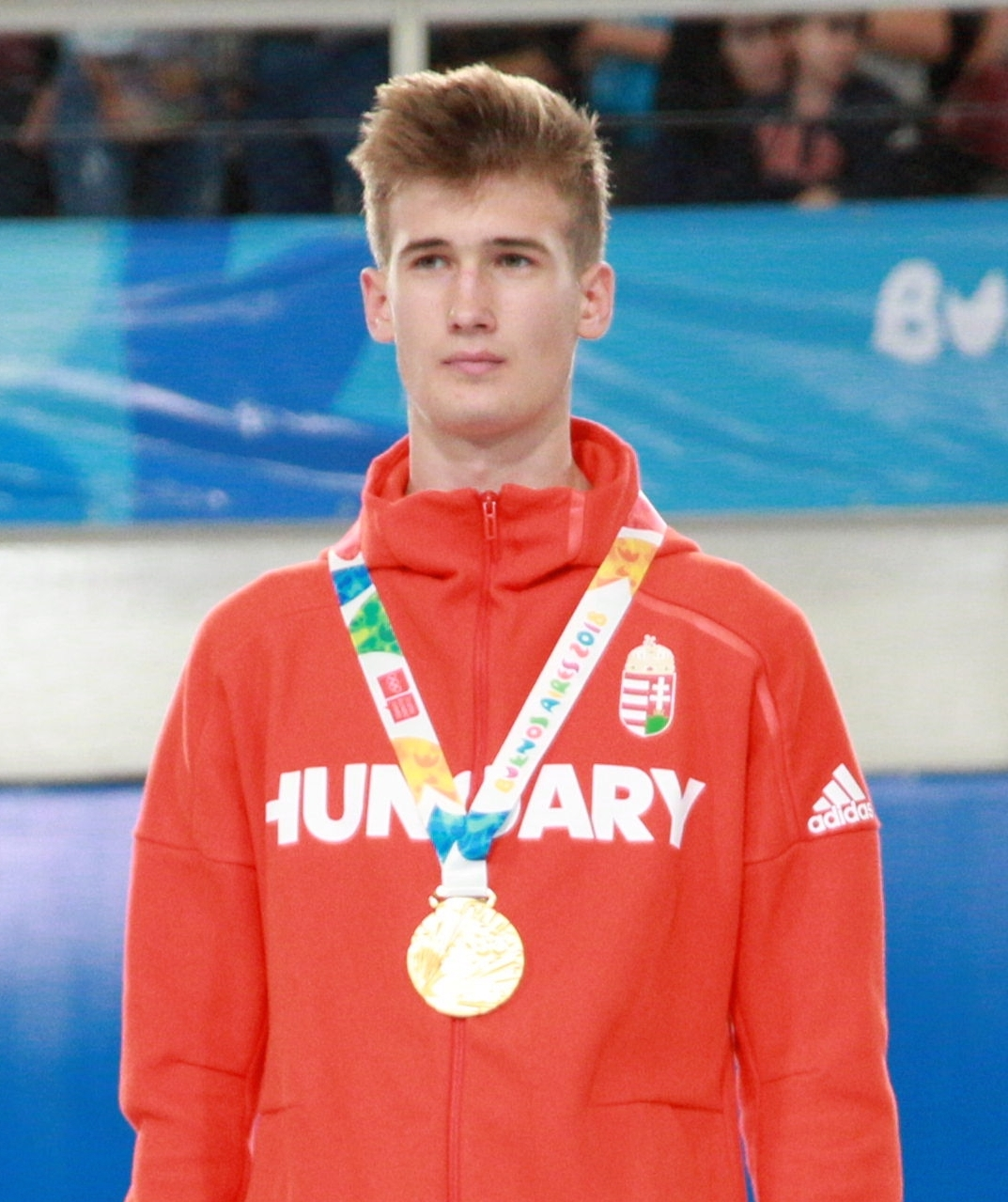
- Rabb in 2018

Personal information
- Born: 10 November 2001 (age 25) Budapest, Hungary

Fencing career
- Sport: Fencing
- Country: Hungary
- Weapon: Sabre
Medal record
Men's sabre
Representing Hungary
Olympic Games
Silver medal – second place	2024 Paris	Team
World Championships
Silver medal – second place	2025 Tbilisi	Team
European Championships
Gold medal – first place	2024 Basel	Team
Gold medal – first place	2025 Genoa	Team
Gold medal – first place	2026 Antony	Team
Youth Olympic Games
Gold medal – first place	2018 Buenos Aires	Individual
Cadet World Championships
Bronze medal – third place	2018 Verona	Individual
Representing (International Olympic Committee) Mixed-NOCs
Youth Olympic Games
Gold medal – first place	2018 Buenos Aires	Mixed team

Krisztián Rabb (born 10 November 2001) is a Hungarian sabre fencer. He competed at the 2024 Summer Olympics.

== Medal record ==
=== World Championship ===
Year	Location	Event	Position
2025	(Georgia (country)) Tbilisi, Georgia	Team Men's Sabre	2nd
