= Senegal at the 2018 Summer Youth Olympics =

- IOC code: SEN
- NOC: Comité National Olympique et Sportif Sénégalais

in Buenos Aires, Argentina 6 – 18 October 2018
- Competitors: 4 in 3 sports
- Medals: Gold 0 Silver 0 Bronze 0 Total 0

Summer Youth Olympics appearances
- 2010; 2014; 2018; 2026

Senegal participated at the 2018 Summer Youth Olympics in Buenos Aires, Argentina from 6 October to 18 October 2018. The nation will host the next Youth Olympic Games in 2022 at Dakar.

== Athletics ==
Athlete	Event	Stage 1		Stage 2		Total	
Athlete	Event	Time	Rank	Time	Rank	Time	Rank
Maty Diop	Girls' 100 m	12.69	22	12.25	23	24.94	23

== Fencing ==
Senegal was given a quota to compete by the tripartite committee.

- Boys' Sabre - 1 quota
