= Gymnastics at the 2018 Summer Youth Olympics – Boys' pommel horse =

Boys' pommel horse at the III Summer Youth Olympic Games
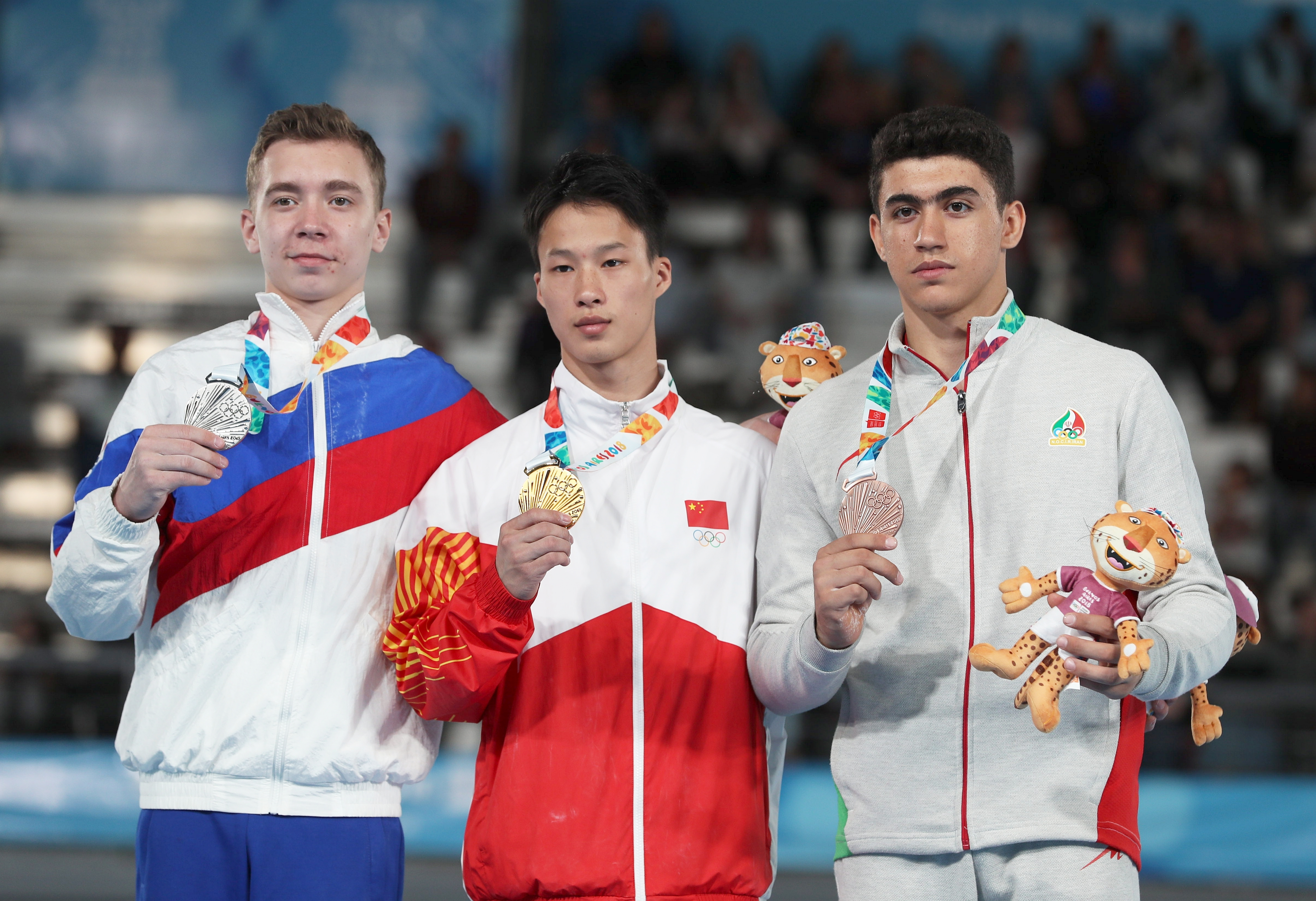
- Venue: America Pavilion
- Date: 13 October
- Competitors: 9 from 9 nations
- Winning score: 13.900

Medalists
1st place, gold medalist(s)		Yin Dehang	China
2nd place, silver medalist(s)		Sergei Naidin	Russia
3rd place, bronze medalist(s)		Reza Bohloulzade Hajlari	Iran

The boys' pommel horse competition at the 2018 Summer Youth Olympics was held at the America Pavilion on 13 October.

== Qualification ==
Rank	Gymnast	D Score	E Score	Pen.	Total	Qualification
1	Takeru Kitazono (JPN)	5.200	8.933		14.133	Q
2	Yin Dehang (CHN)	5.400	8.466		13.866	Q
3	Sergei Naidin (RUS)	5.000	8.666		13.666	Q
4	Daniel Schwed (GER)	5.000	8.233		13.233	Q
5	Reza Bohloulzade Hajlari (IRI)	4.400	8.766		13.166	Q
6	Adam Tobin (GBR)	4.600	8.400		13.000	Q
7	Diogo Soares (BRA)	4.600	8.133		12.733	Q
8	Ayan Moldagaliyev (KAZ)	4.500	8.225		12.725	Q
9	Brandon Briones (USA)	4.500	8.133		12.633	R1
10	Ward Claeys (BEL)	4.600	8.033		12.633	R2
11	Krisztián Balázs (HUN)	4.200	8.333		12.533	R3

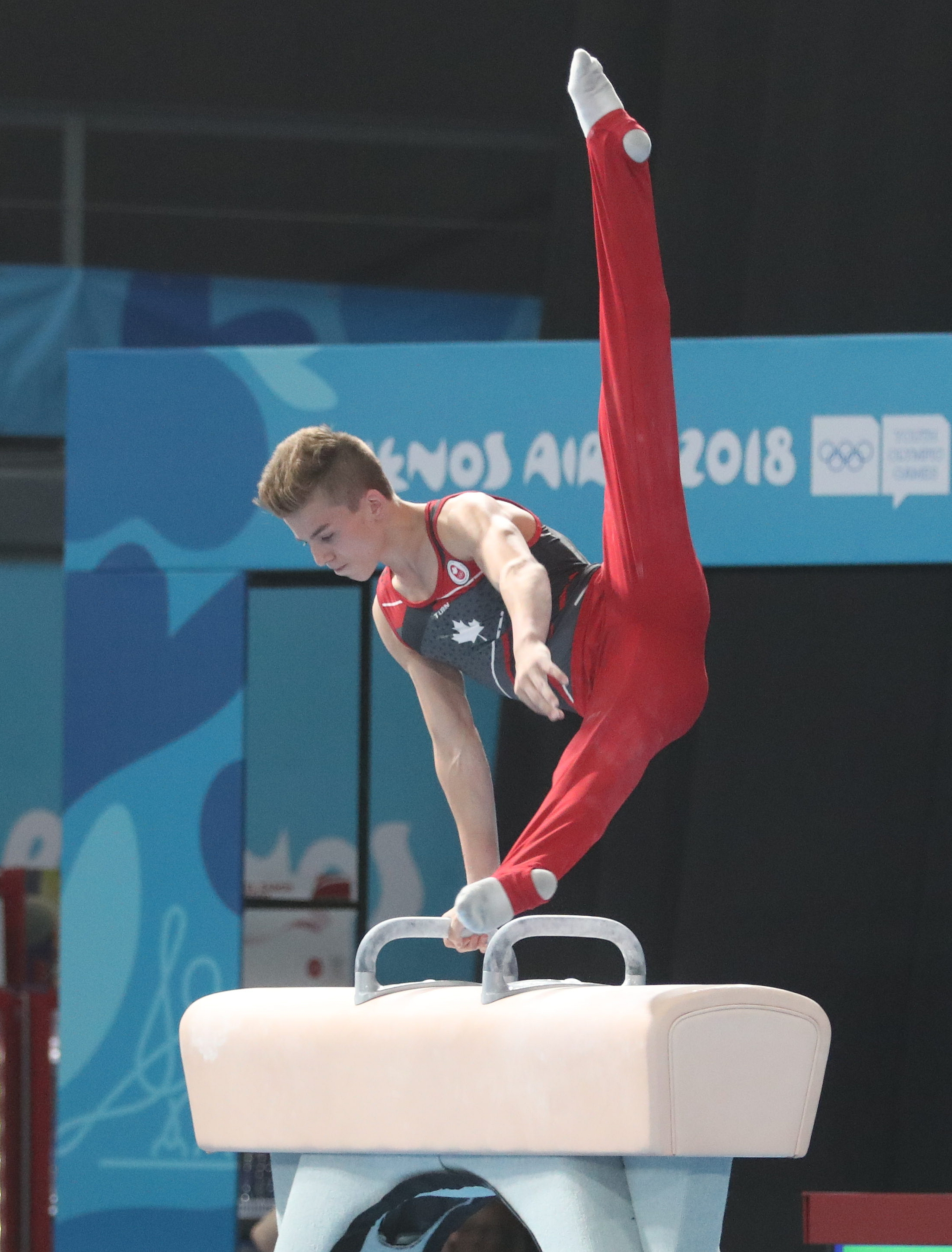
Félix Dolci (rank 12)

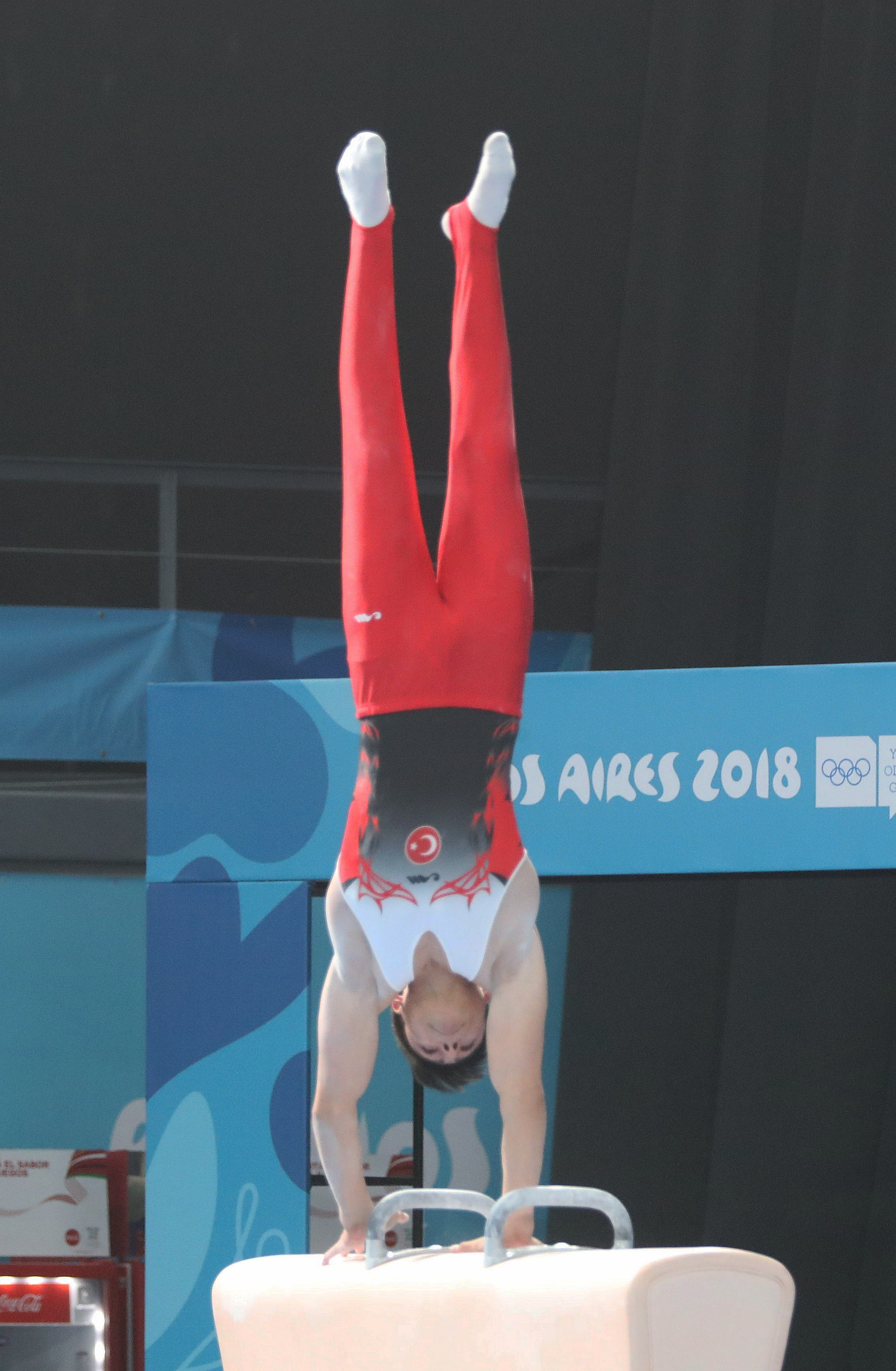
Bora Tarhan (rank 15)

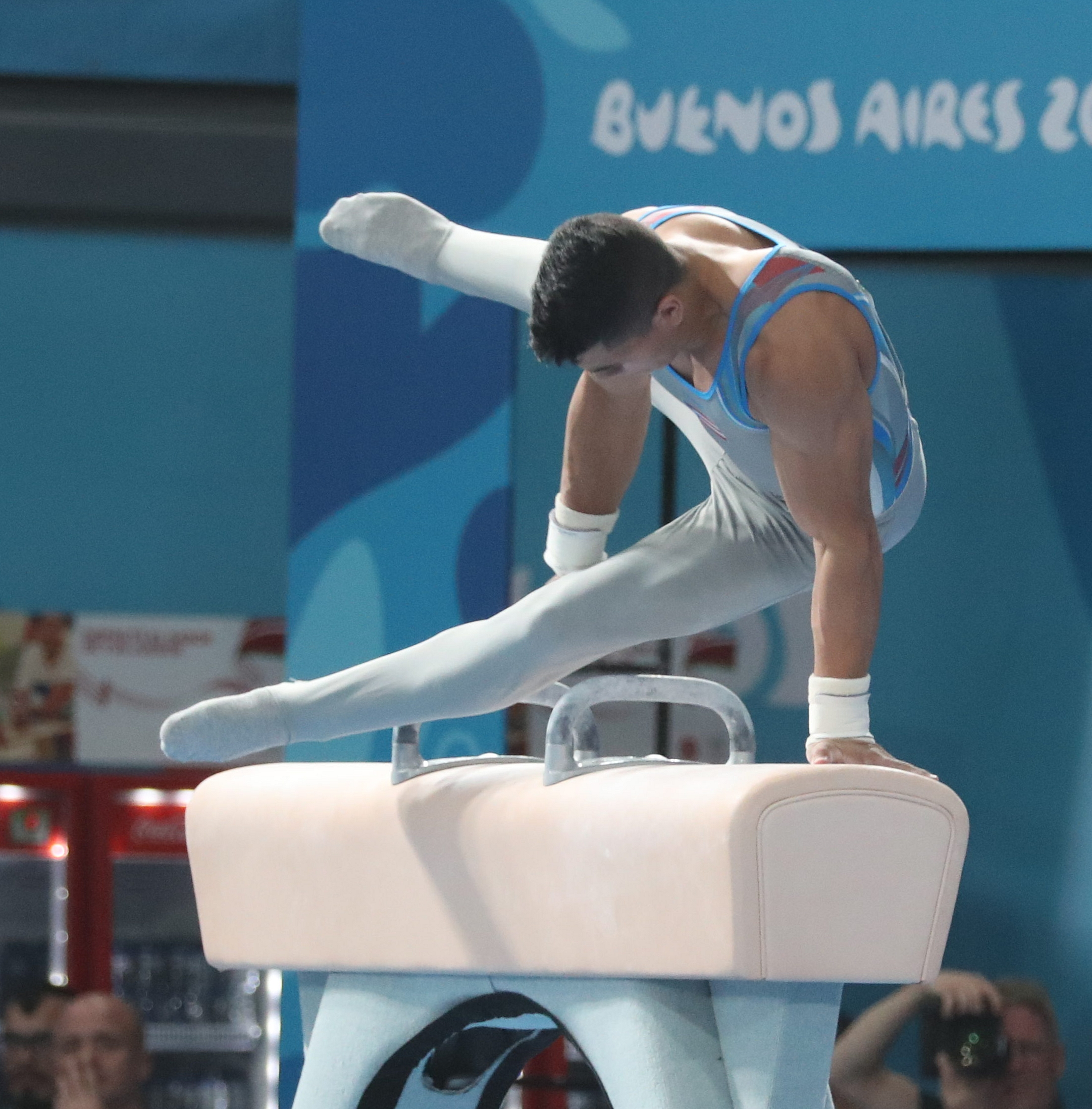
Michael Torres (rank 16)

== Final ==
Rank	Gymnast	D Score	E Score	Pen.	Total
1st place, gold medalist(s)	Yin Dehang (CHN)	5.500	8.400		13.900
2nd place, silver medalist(s)	Sergei Naidin (RUS)	5.400	8.100		13.500
3rd place, bronze medalist(s)	Reza Bohloulzade Hajlari (IRI)	4.400	8.841		13.241
4	Daniel Schwed (GER)	5.000	8.166		13.166
5	Brandon Briones (USA)	4.500	8.233		12.733
6	Takeru Kitazono (JPN)	5.200	7.466		12.666
7	Diogo Soares (BRA)	4.900	7.033		11.933
8	Ayan Moldagaliyev (KAZ)	4.400	6.933		11.333
9	Adam Tobin (GBR)	3.900	5.633		9.533

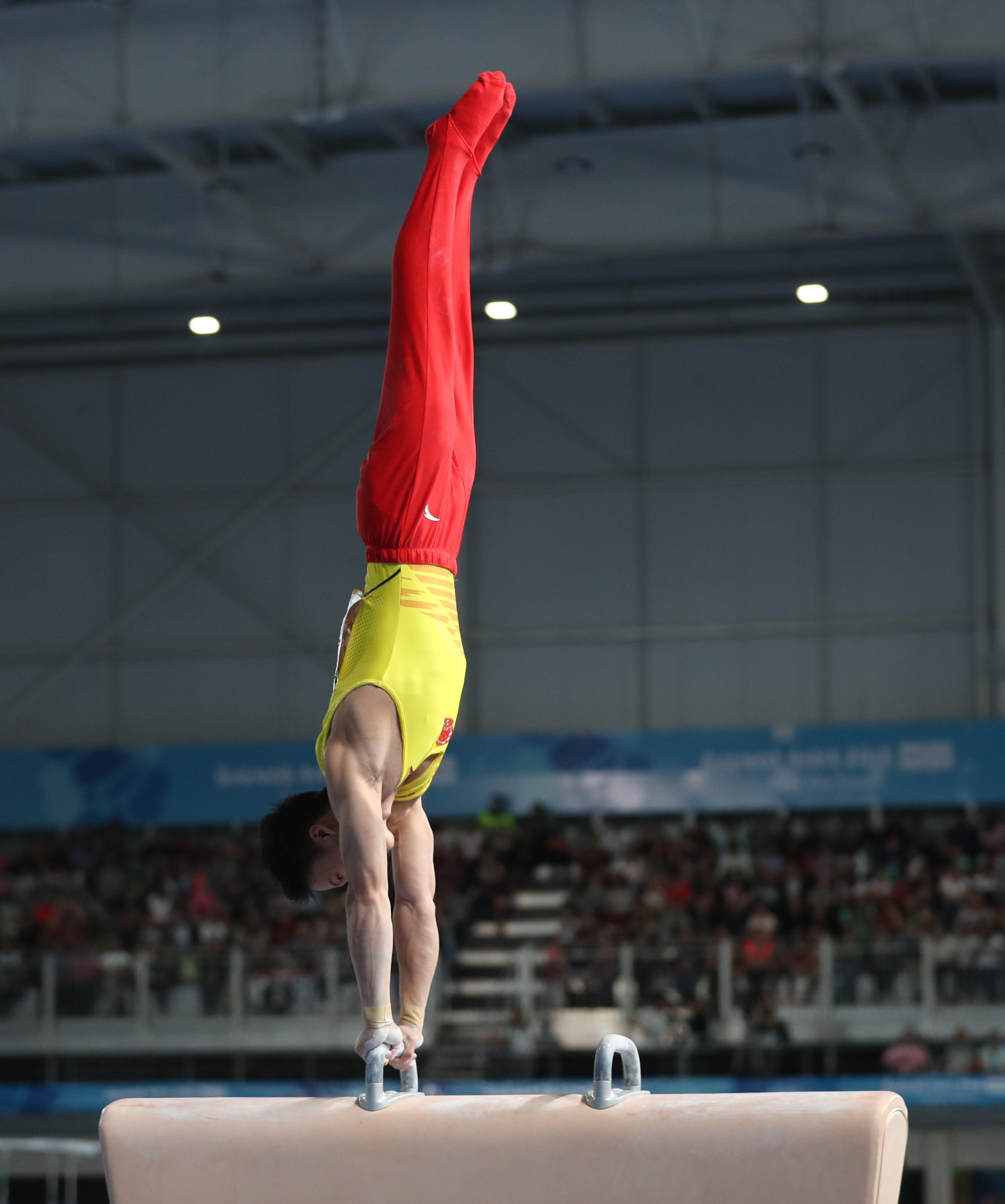
Yin Dehang

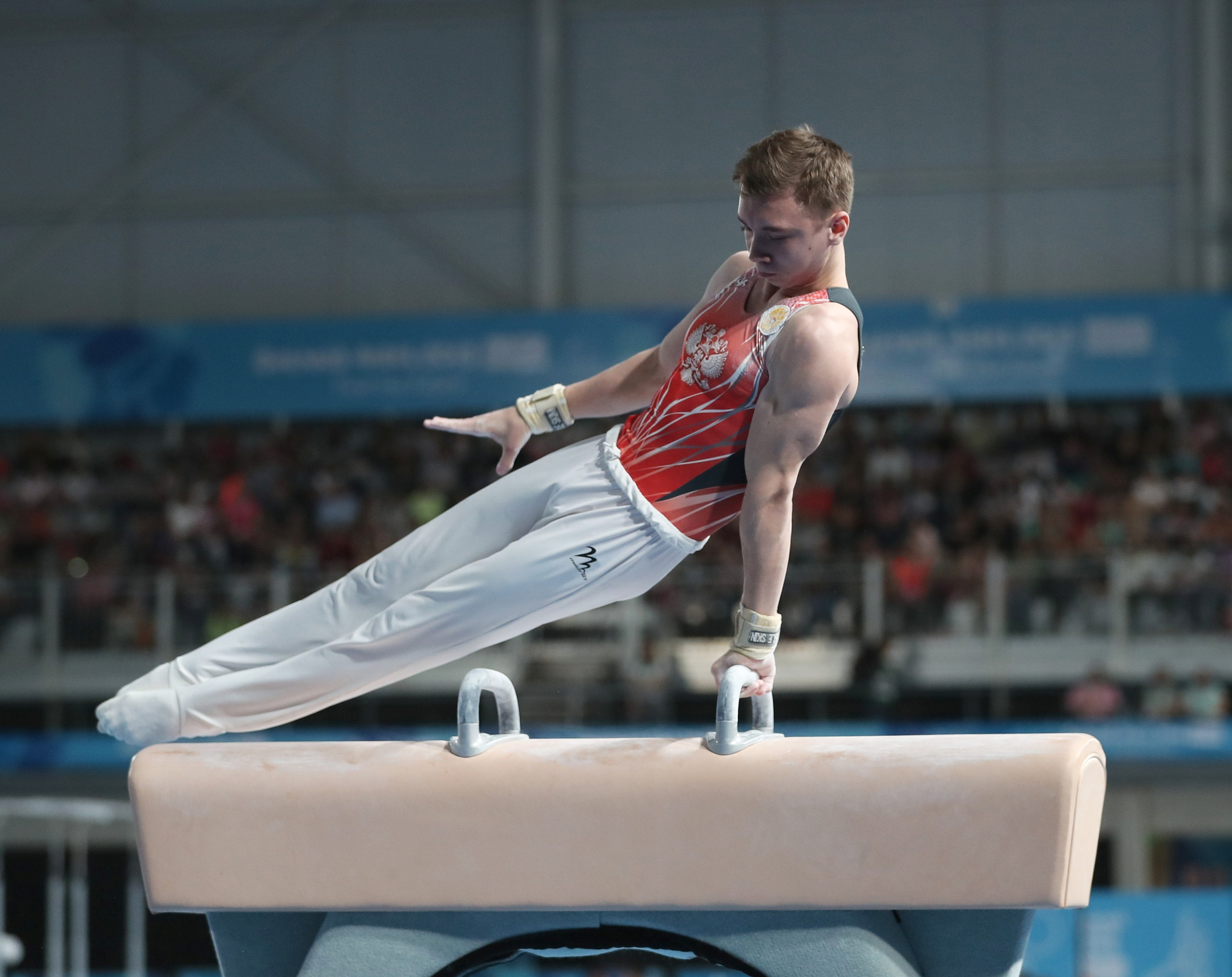
Sergei Naidin

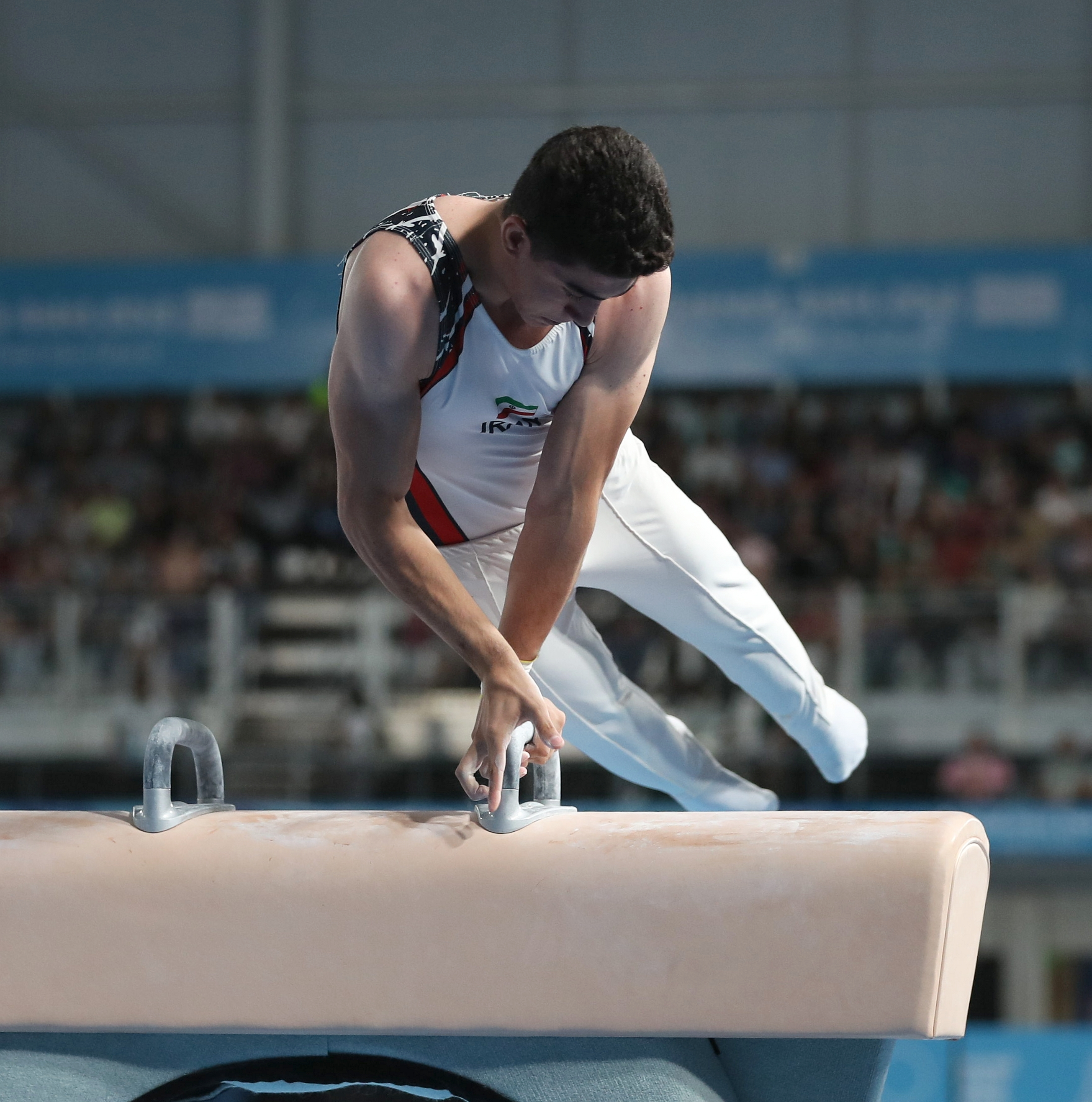
Reza Bohloulzade Hajlari
