= Gymnastics at the 2018 Summer Youth Olympics – Boys' rings =

Boys' rings at the III Summer Youth Olympic Games
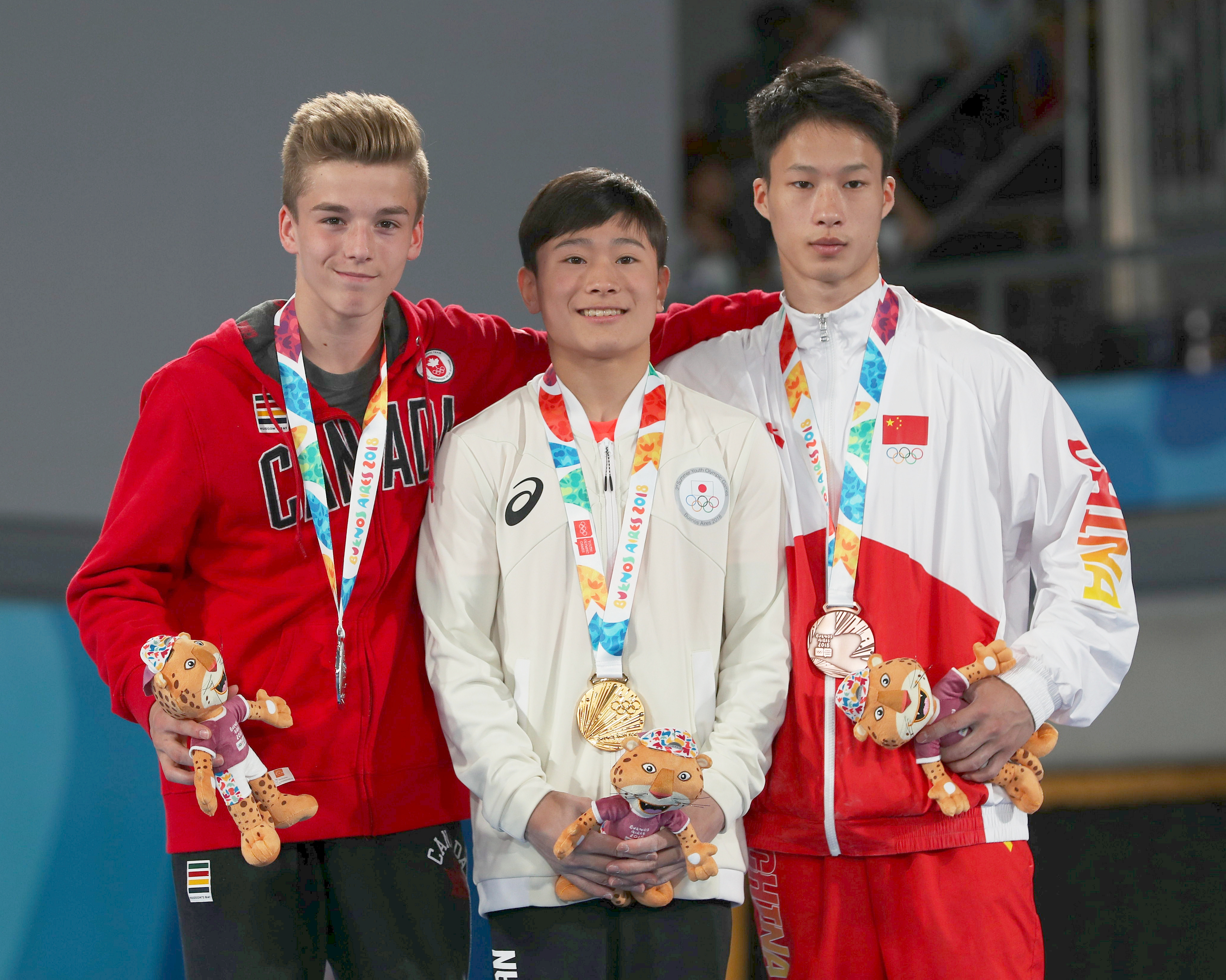
- Venue: America Pavilion
- Date: 14 October
- Competitors: 8 from 8 nations
- Winning score: 13.533

Medalists
1st place, gold medalist(s)		Takeru Kitazono	Japan
2nd place, silver medalist(s)		Félix Dolci	Canada
3rd place, bronze medalist(s)		Yin Dehang	China

The boys' rings competition at the 2018 Summer Youth Olympics was held at the America Pavilion on 14 October.

== Qualification ==
Rank	Gymnast	D Score	E Score	Pen.	Total	Qualification
1	Takeru Kitazono (JPN)	4.800	8.900		13.700	Q
2	Brandon Briones (USA)	4.600	8.933		13.533	Q
3	Yin Dehang (CHN)	5.100	8.400		13.500	Q
4	Félix Dolci (CAN)	4.500	8.966		13.466	Q
5	Adam Tobin (GBR)	4.200	9.100		13.300	Q
6	Oļegs Ivanovs (LAT)	4.200	8.900		13.100	Q
7	Diogo Soares (BRA)	4.500	8.466		12.966	Q
8	Lay Giannini (ITA)	4.000	8.900		12.900	Q
9	Sergei Naidin (RUS)	4.100	8.766		12.866	R1
10	Jacob Karlsen (NOR)	4.200	8.666		12.866	R2
11	Krisztián Balázs (HUN)	4.200	8.633		12.833	R3

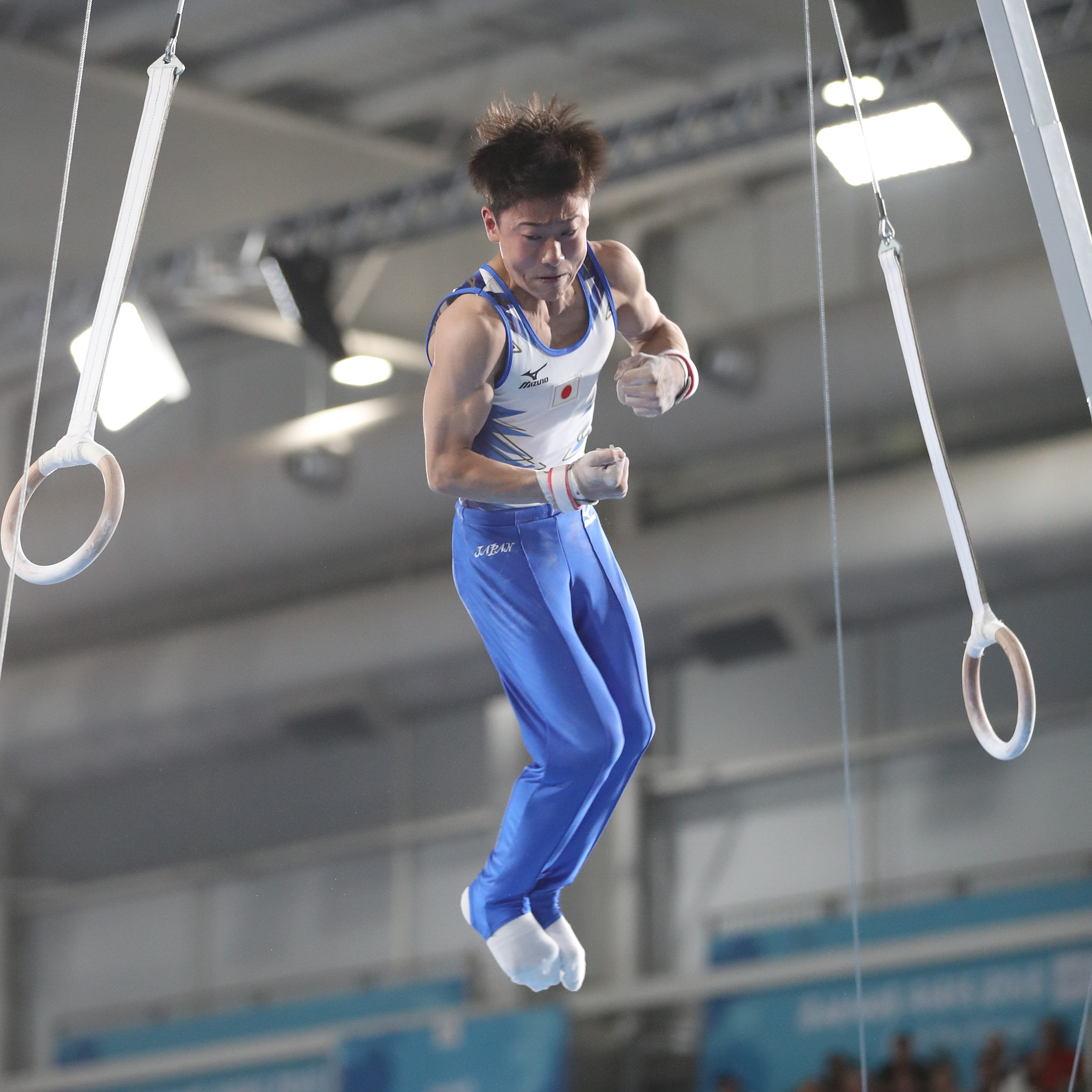
Takeru Kitazono

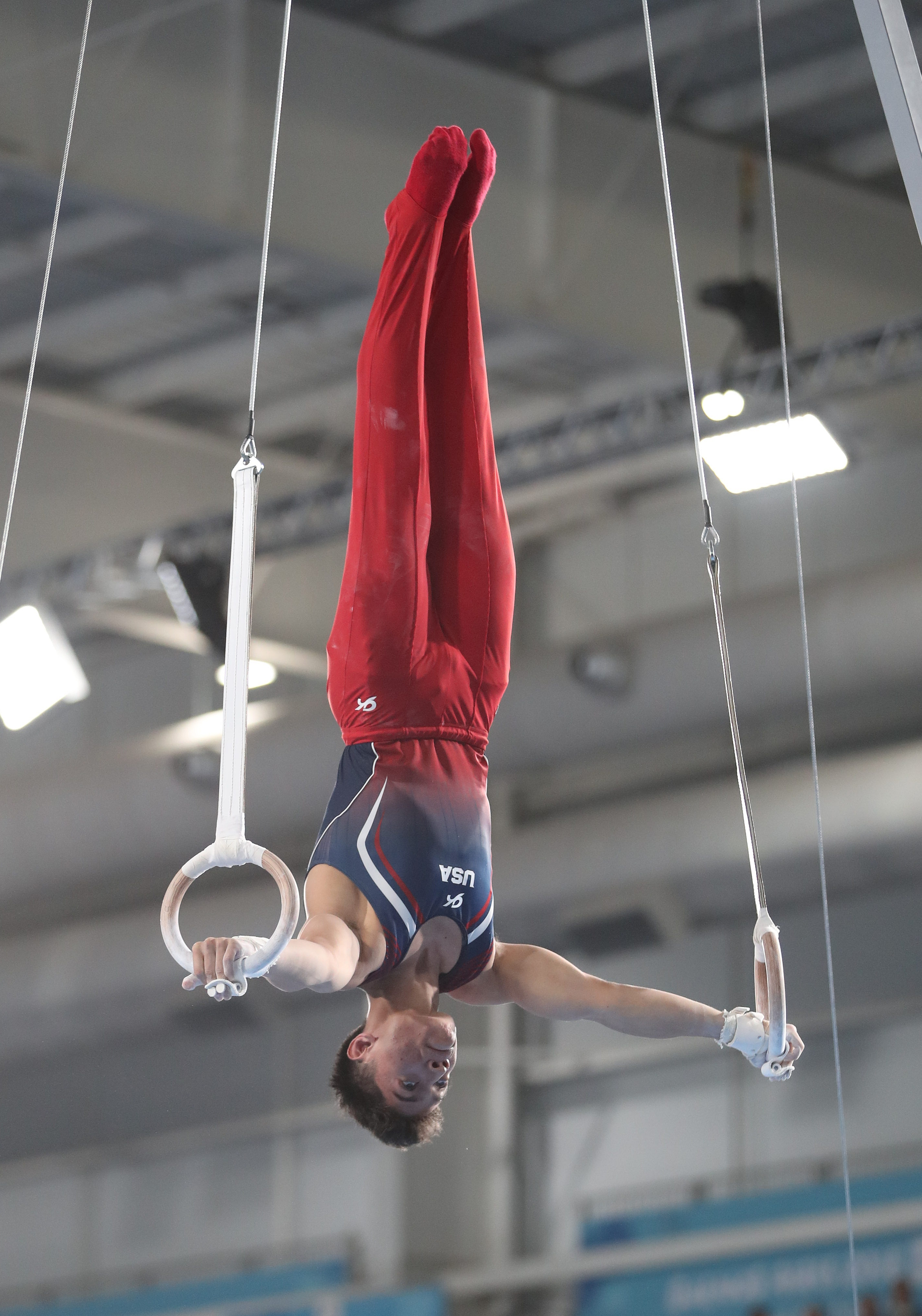
Brandon Briones

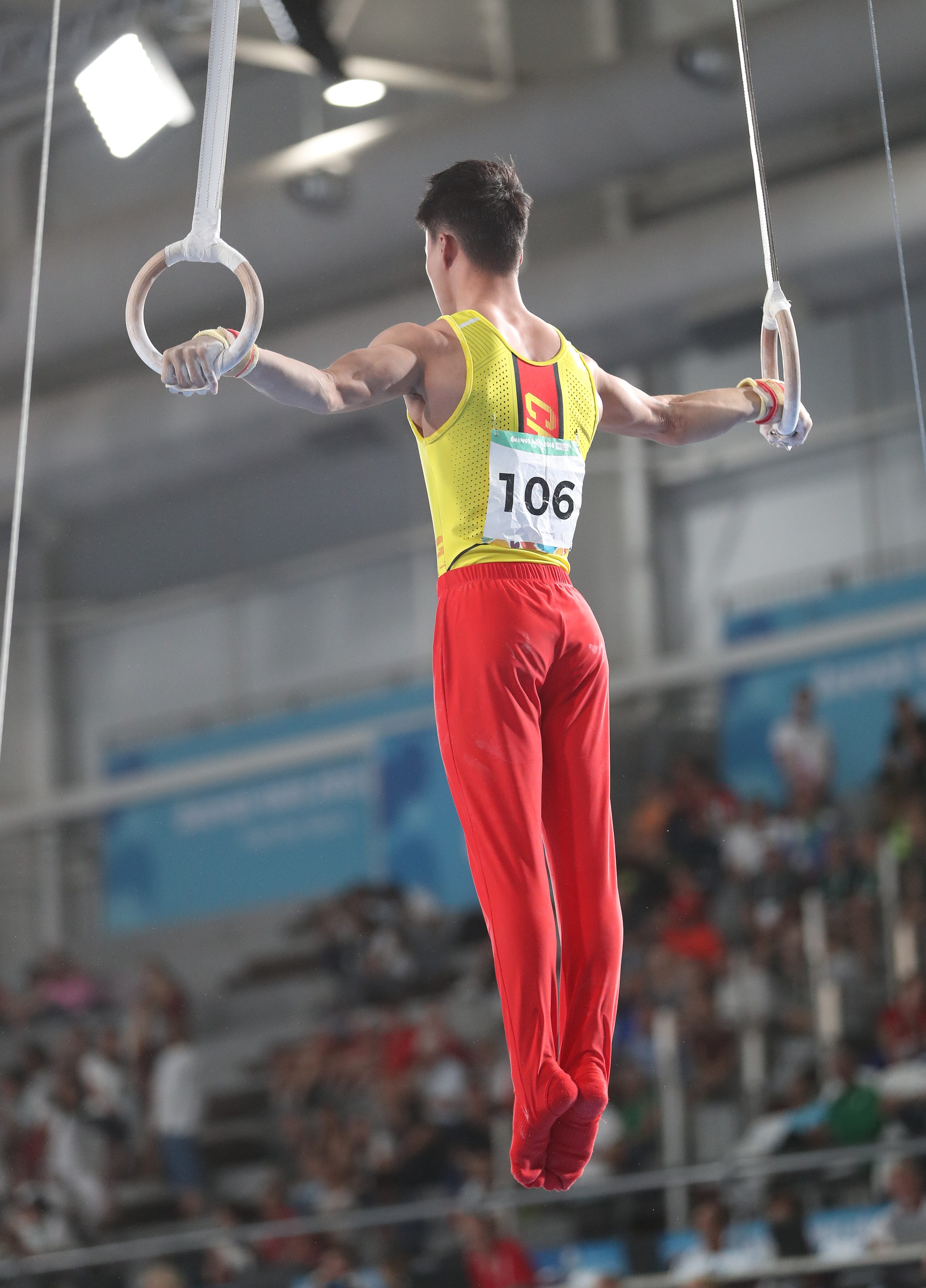
Yin Dehang

== Final ==
Rank	Gymnast	D Score	E Score	Pen.	Total
1st place, gold medalist(s)	Takeru Kitazono (JPN)	4.900	8.633		13.533
2nd place, silver medalist(s)	Félix Dolci (CAN)	4.500	8.866		13.366
3rd place, bronze medalist(s)	Yin Dehang (CHN)	5.100	8.200		13.300
4	Brandon Briones (USA)	4.600	8.666		13.266
5	Adam Tobin (GBR)	4.200	8.833		13.033
6	Diogo Soares (BRA)	4.500	8.466		12.966
7	Oļegs Ivanovs (LAT)	4.200	8.366		12.566
8	Lay Giannini (ITA)	4.000	8.466		12.466

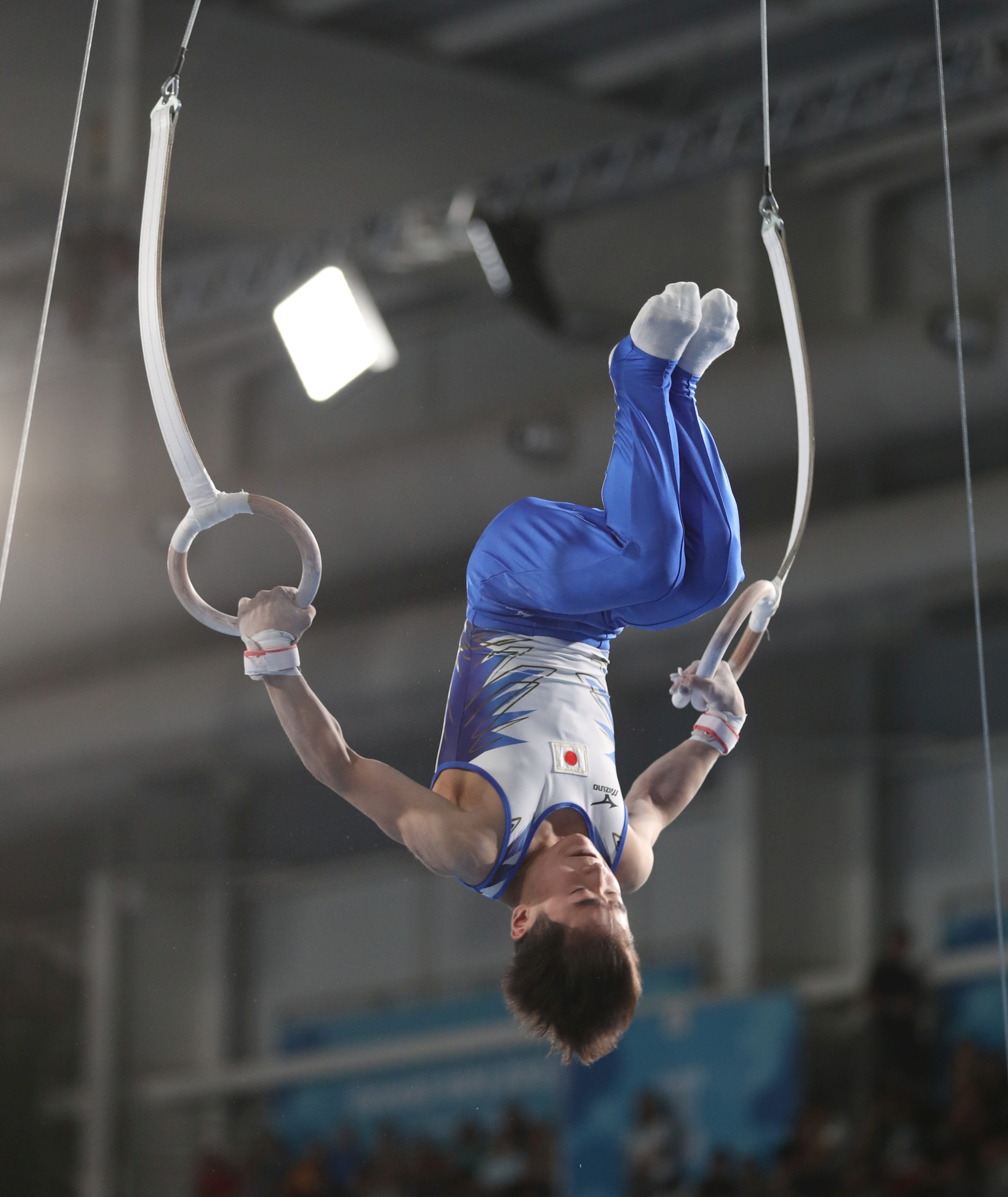
Takeru Kitazono

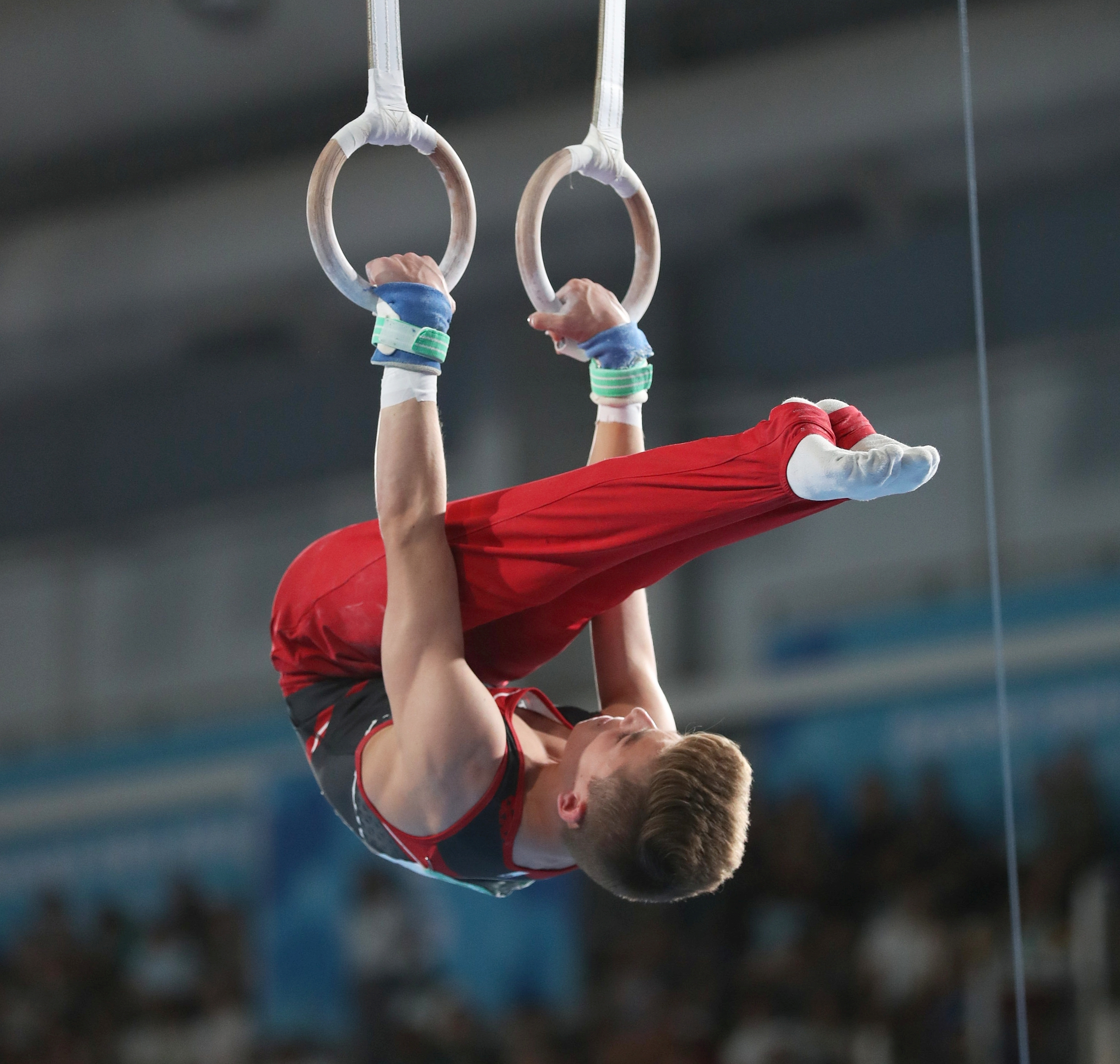
Félix Dolci

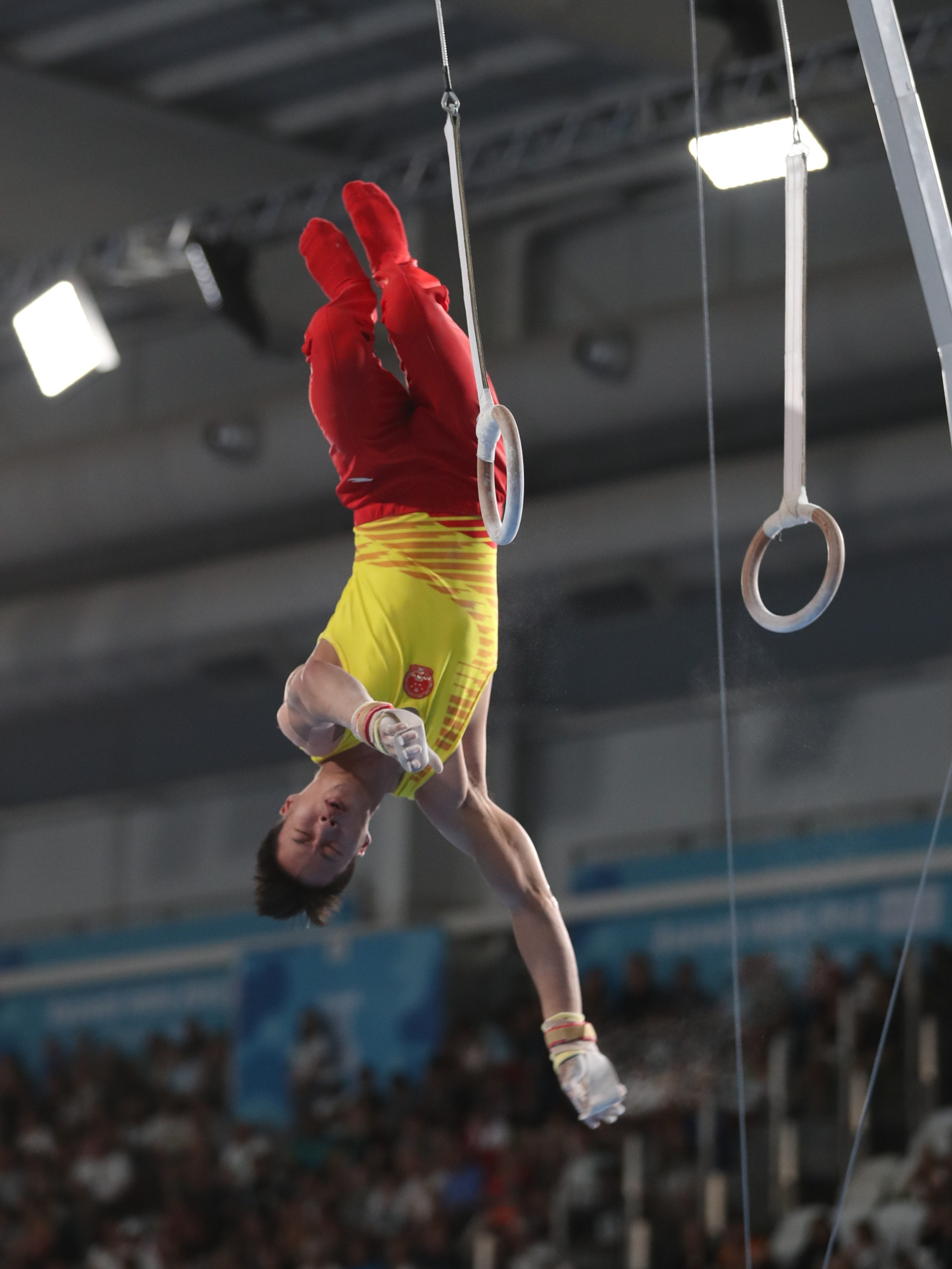
Yin Dehang
