= Sergei Naidin =

Russian artistic gymnast

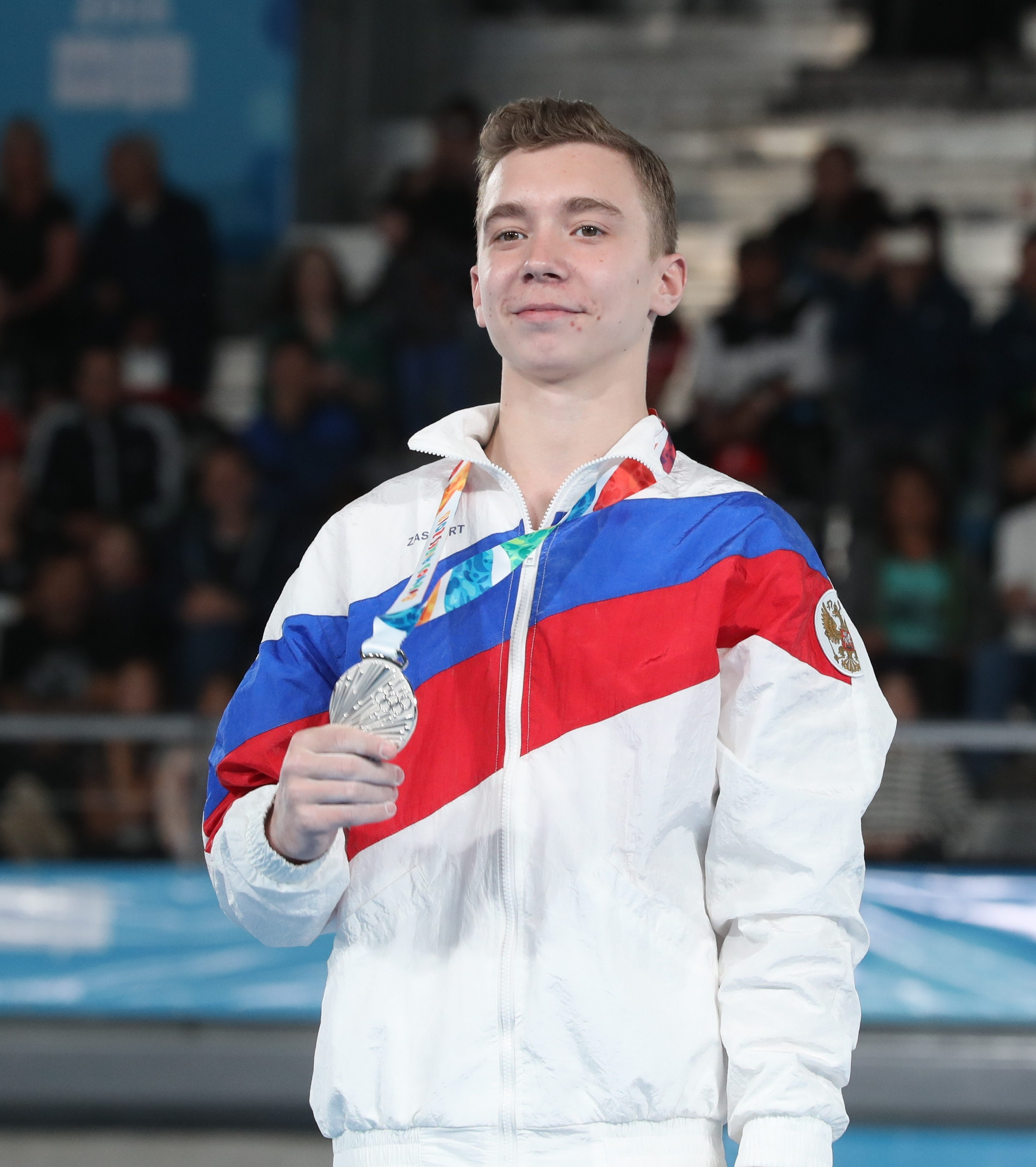
- Naidin at the 2018 Youth Olympic Games

Personal information
- Full name: Sergei Sergeevich Naidin
- Alternative name: Sergei Naydin
- Nickname: Seryoga
- Born: 11 July 2001 (age 25) Barnaul, Altai Krai, Russia

Gymnastics career
- Discipline: Men's artistic gymnastics
- Country represented: Russia; (2014–present)
- Club: Dynamo Barnaul
- Head coach: Sergei Horohordina
- Assistant coach: Sergei Stepanenko
Medal record
Representing Russia
Men's artistic gymnastics
World Championships
Silver medal – second place	2026 Rotterdam	Team
Bronze medal – third place	2026 Rotterdam	Horizontal bar
Youth Olympic Games
Silver medal – second place	2018 Buenos Aires	All-around
Silver medal – second place	2018 Buenos Aires	Pommel horse
Bronze medal – third place	2018 Buenos Aires	Floor exercise
Bronze medal – third place	2018 Buenos Aires	Parallel bars

Sergei "Seryoga" Sergeevich Naidin (Russian: Сергей Сергеевич Найдин; born 11 July 2001 in Barnaul, Altai Krai, Russia) is a Russian artistic gymnast. He is the 2016 European Junior Pommel horse champion. On the national level, he is a two-time the 2016, 2018 Russian Junior National All-around champion.

== Career ==
=== Junior ===
Naidin began gymnastics in 2006 in Barnaul. In 2014, he competed at the Russian Youth Games where he came in 1st in the all-around. At the "Hope of Russia" competition, he won the all-around, as well as finishing 1st on floor, rings, pommel horse, parallel bars, horizontal bar and 2nd in vault. In 2015, Naidin competed at the international junior gymnastics competition, the Yokohama Cup in Japan finishing 4th in horizontal bar and 5th on floor.

In 2016, Naidin won the 2016 Russian Junior National all-around title, he also took first place in floor, rings and pommel horse. On May 25–29, he competed at the 2016 European Junior Championships where Russia won silver in the team event. Naidin also finished 8th in the individual all-around final. He qualified in one apparatus final, where he won gold in pommel horse.

In 2017, after almost taking a one-year break in competitions related to an injury. Naidin returned to a national competition in June, at the Russian Youth Student Games "2017 Summer Spartakiada". On July 23–30, he competed at the 2017 European Youth Olympic Festival in Győr, Hungary where team Russia won gold (together with Yuri Busse and Aleksandr Kartsev). He finished 6th in the all-around and qualified to three apparatus finals, winning two gold medals in parallel bars and pommel horse, and bronze in rings. In September, Naidin competed at the Junior Japan International, finishing 12th in the all-around.

In 2018, Naidin competed for the qualifying competition in artistic gymnastics for the 2018 Summer Youth Olympics held in Baku, Azerbaijan, where he took silver in the all-around behind teammate Yuri Busse. On July 4–7, at the 2018 Russian Junior National Championships, Naidin defended his title and won the all-around gold ahead of Busse, in the event finals: he won gold medals in floor, pommel horse, parallel bars, silver in high bar and finished 7th in rings. He has received the title of Master of Sport of International Class in the Russian Federation.

At the 2018 Summer Youth Olympic Games he won the all-around silver medal behind Takeru Kitazono. After the all-around competition, his coach did not register him for the apparatus finals by mistake. The International Olympic Committee accepted his appeal and registered him as a ninth gymnast to compete in the apparatus finals. There he won a silver medal on pommel horse and bronze medals on floor and parallel bars. He could not compete in the horizontal bar final due to a back injury.

Naidin's favorite apparatus are the pommel horse, parallel bars and horizontal bar.

== Competitive history ==
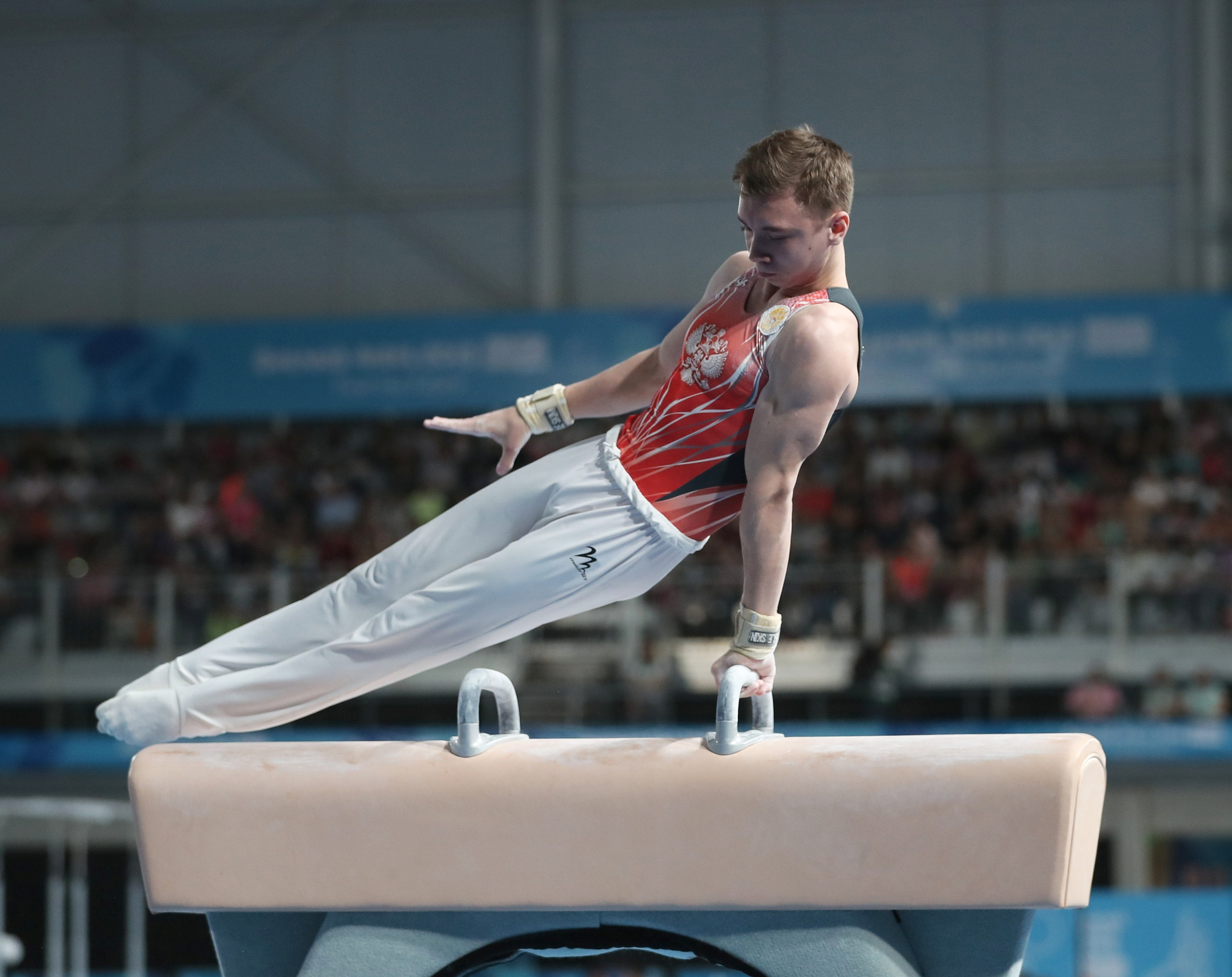
Naidin performing a Russian wendeswing during the pommel horse final at the 2018 Summer Youth Olympics

Year	Event	Team	AA	FX	PH	SR	VT	PB	HB
Junior
2015	Junior Japan International		13						4
2016
2016	European Junior Championships	2nd place, silver medalist(s)	8		1st place, gold medalist(s)				
2016	Russian Junior Championships (CMS)		1st place, gold medalist(s)						
2017	European Youth Olympic Festival	1st place, gold medalist(s)	6		1st place, gold medalist(s)	3rd place, bronze medalist(s)		1st place, gold medalist(s)	
2017	Junior Japan International		12						7
2018	Russian Junior Championships		1st place, gold medalist(s)	1st place, gold medalist(s)	1st place, gold medalist(s)	7		1st place, gold medalist(s)	2nd place, silver medalist(s)
2018	European Junior Championships	1st place, gold medalist(s)	3rd place, bronze medalist(s)	3rd place, bronze medalist(s)					8
2018	Summer Youth Spartakiad		3rd place, bronze medalist(s)	2nd place, silver medalist(s)	10	1st place, gold medalist(s)	10		1st place, gold medalist(s)
2018	Youth Summer Olympics Qualifier		2nd place, silver medalist(s)	3rd place, bronze medalist(s)	1st place, gold medalist(s)	2nd place, silver medalist(s)	2nd place, silver medalist(s)		
2018	Youth Summer Olympics		2nd place, silver medalist(s)	3rd place, bronze medalist(s)	2nd place, silver medalist(s)			3rd place, bronze medalist(s)	
Senior
2019	Russian Cup		41						
2021	National Championships	4	16						
2021	Russian Cup		4		5				
2021	World Championships				12			24	66
2026
2026	World Championships	2nd place, silver medalist(s)							3rd place, bronze medalist(s)
