= Gymnastics at the 2018 Summer Youth Olympics – Boys' floor exercise =

Boys' floor at the III Summer Youth Olympic Games
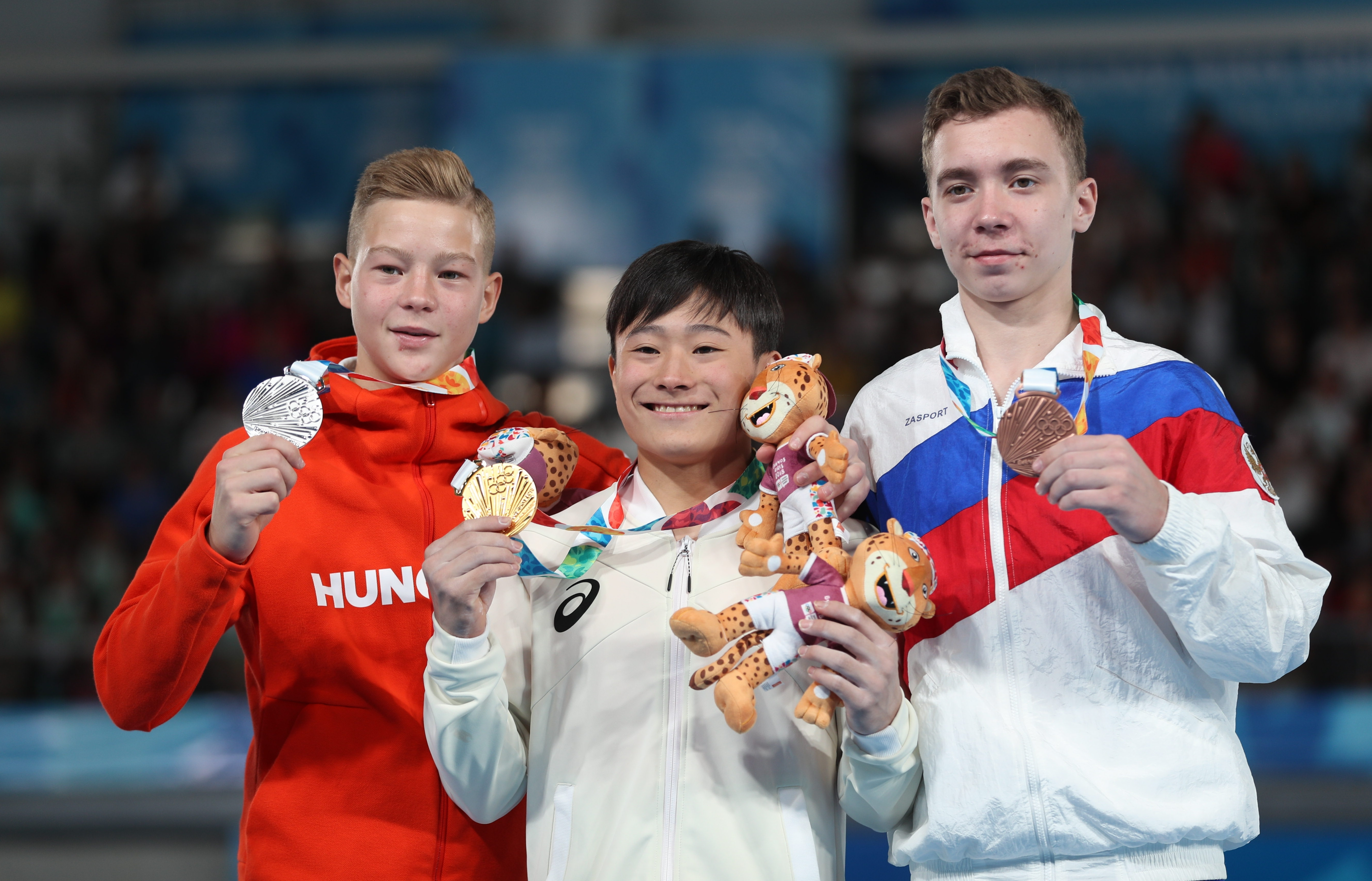
- Venue: America Pavilion
- Date: 13 October
- Competitors: 9 from 9 nations
- Winning score: 13.633

Medalists
1st place, gold medalist(s)		Takeru Kitazono	Japan
2nd place, silver medalist(s)		Krisztián Balázs	Hungary
3rd place, bronze medalist(s)		Sergei Naidin	Russia

The boys' floor competition at the 2018 Summer Youth Olympics was held at the America Pavilion on 13 October.

== Qualification ==
Rank	Gymnast	D Score	E Score	Pen.	Total	Qualification
1	Brandon Briones (USA)	4.700	9.200		13.900	Q
2	Sergei Naidin (RUS)	5.000	8.800		13.800	Q
3	Adam Tobin (GBR)	4.900	8.733		13.633	Q
4	Lay Giannini (ITA)	4.500	9.066		13.566	Q
5	Nazar Chepurnyi (UKR)	5.000	8.666	−0.1	13.566	Q
6	Krisztián Balázs (HUN)	5.000	8.533		13.533	Q
7	Takeru Kitazono (JPN)	4.900	8.600		13.500	Q
8	Daniel Schwed (GER)	4.600	8.883		13.483	Q
9	Félix Dolci (CAN)	5.100	8.433	−0.1	13.433	R1
10	Martin Guðmundsson (ISL)	4.700	8.550		13.250	R2
11	Yin Dehang (CHN)	4.900	8.433	−0.1	13.233	R3

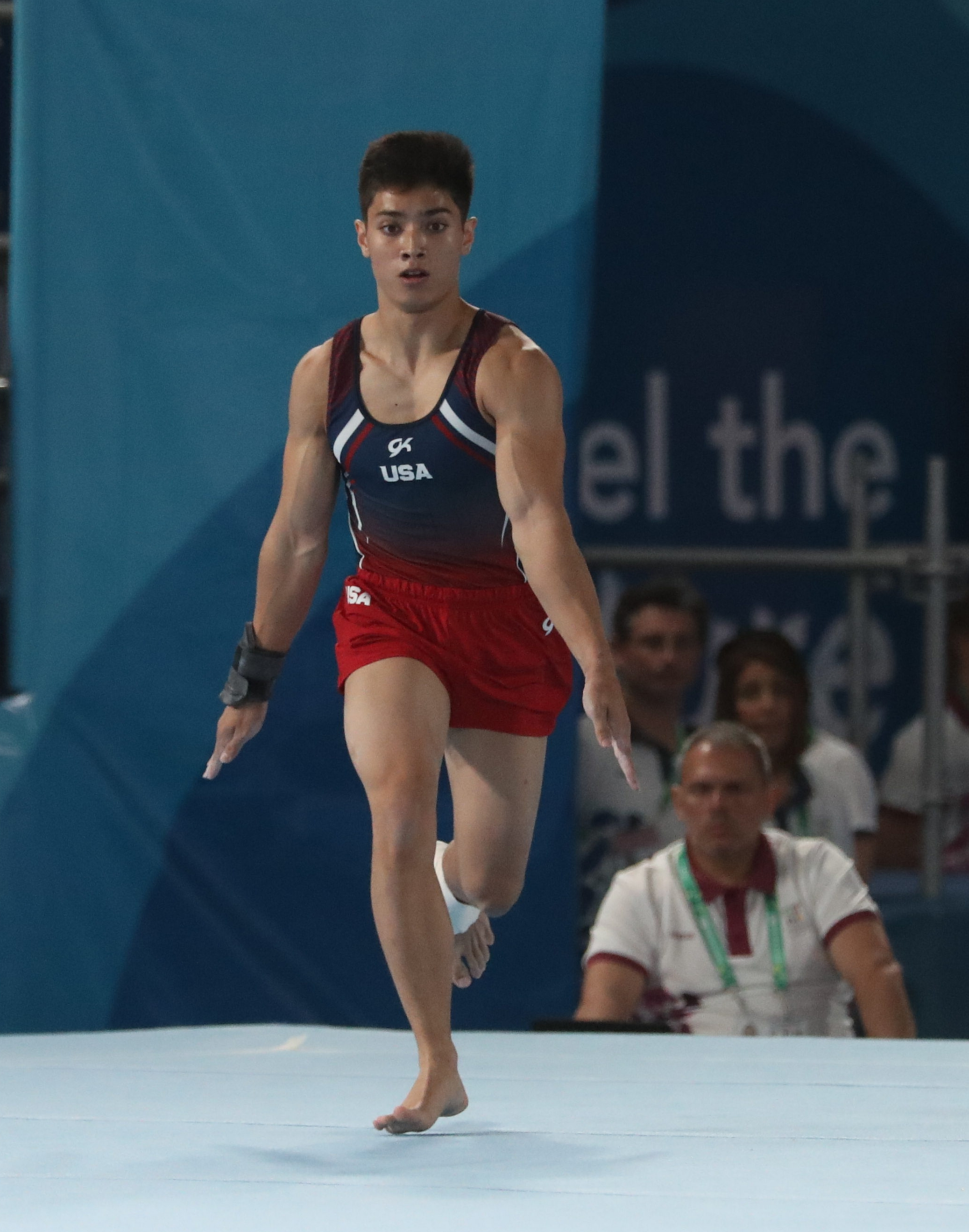
Brandon Briones

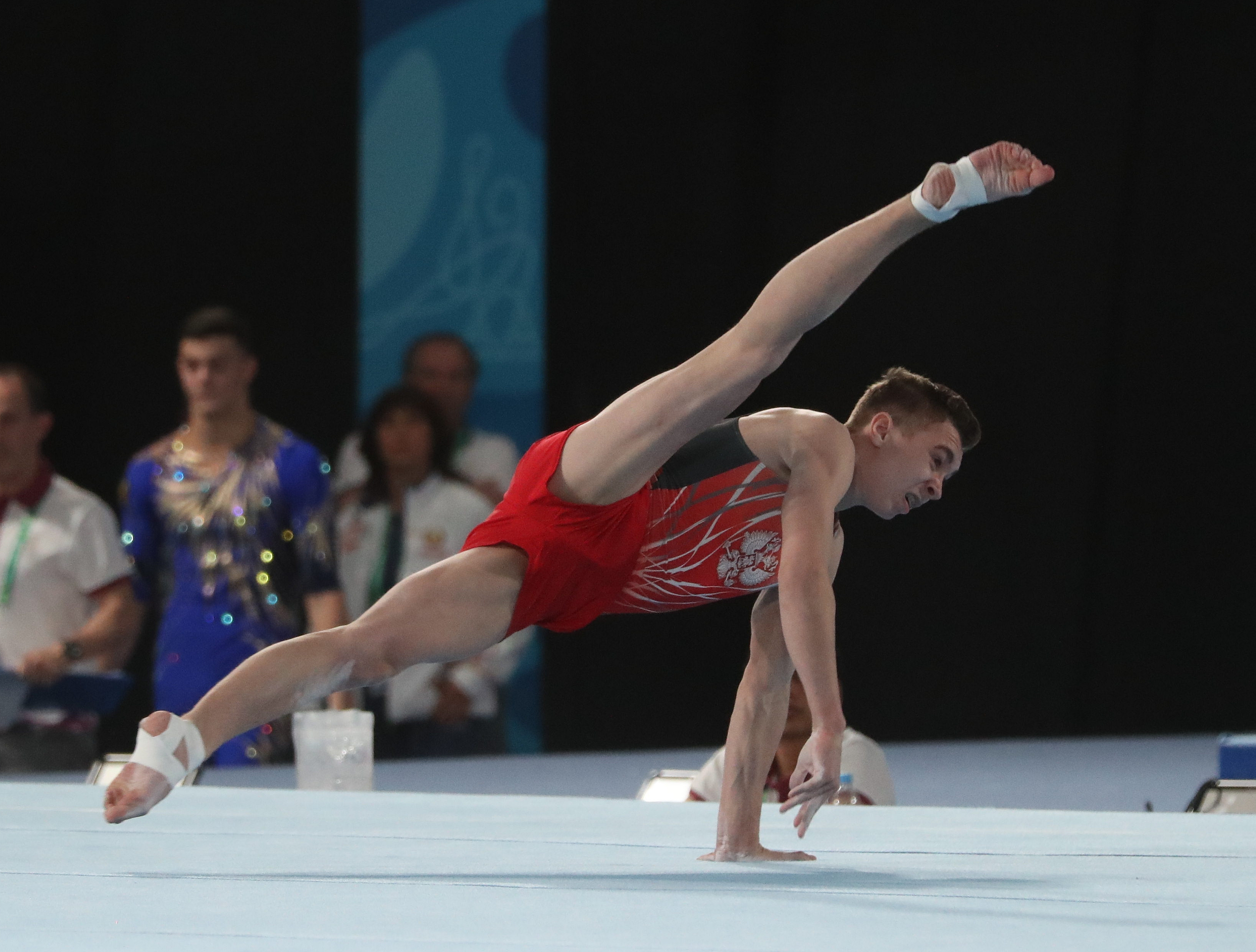
Sergei Naidin

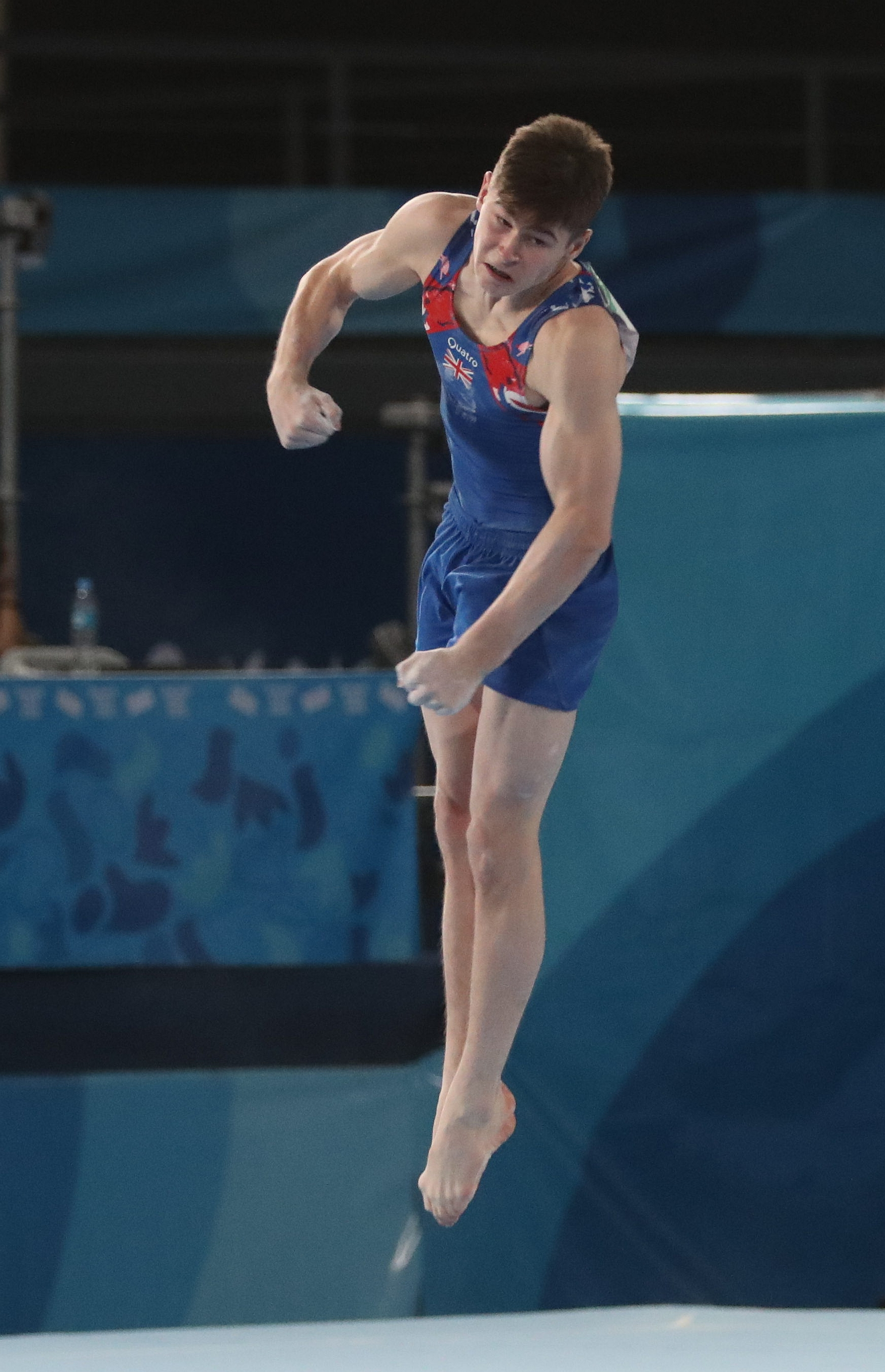
Adam Tobin

== Final ==
Rank	Gymnast	D Score	E Score	Pen.	Total
1st place, gold medalist(s)	Takeru Kitazono (JPN)	4.900	8.733		13.633
2nd place, silver medalist(s)	Krisztián Balázs (HUN)	5.000	8.600		13.600
3rd place, bronze medalist(s)	Sergei Naidin (RUS)	4.900	8.666		13.566
4	Nazar Chepurnyi (UKR)	5.000	8.500		13.500
5	Brandon Briones (USA)	4.700	8.766		13.466
6	Félix Dolci (CAN)	5.100	8.233		13.333
7	Adam Tobin (GBR)	4.800	8.433		13.233
8	Daniel Schwed (GER)	4.600	8.566		13.166
9	Lay Giannini (ITA)	4.500	8.800	−0.3	13.000

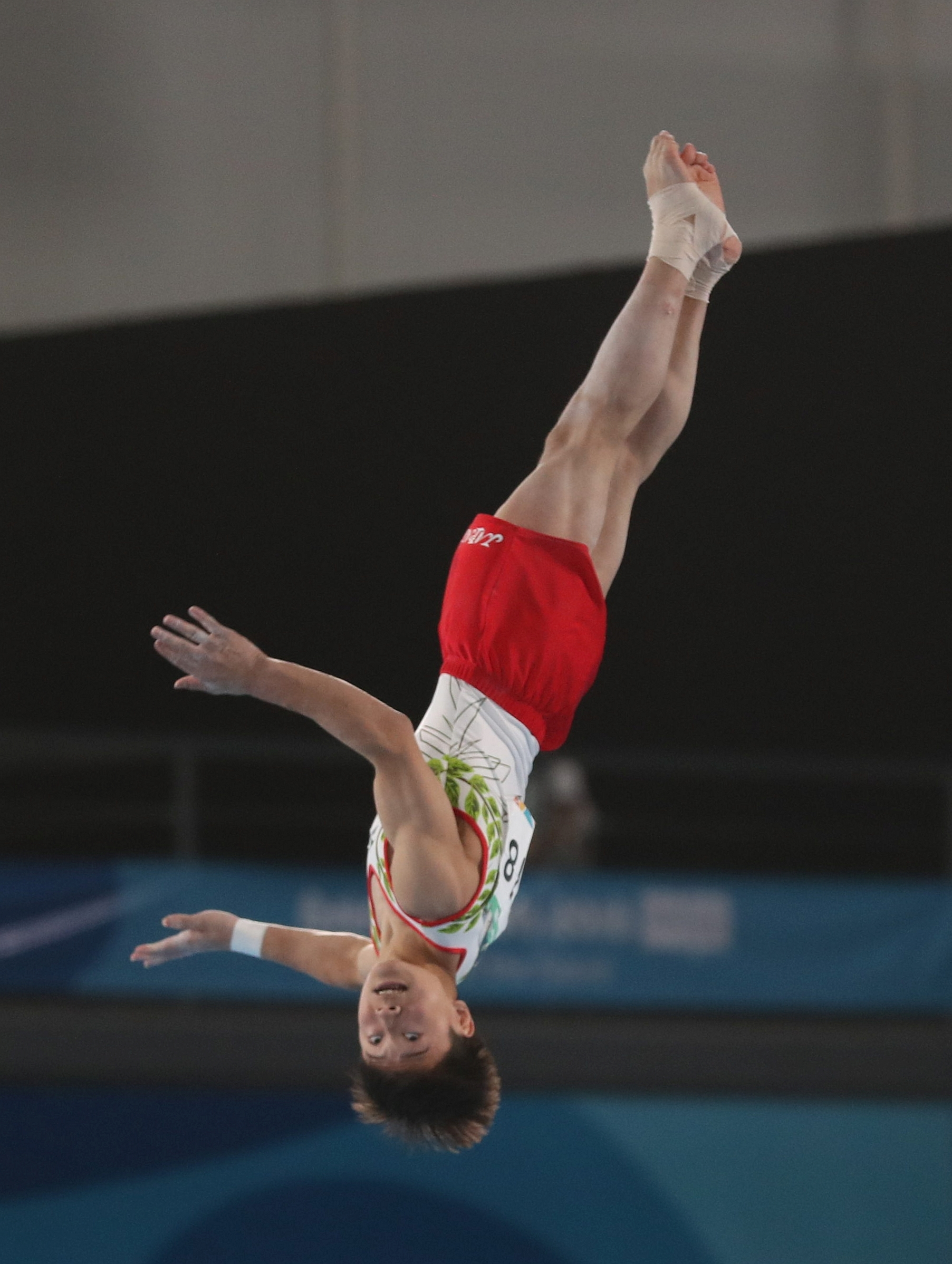
Takeru Kitazono

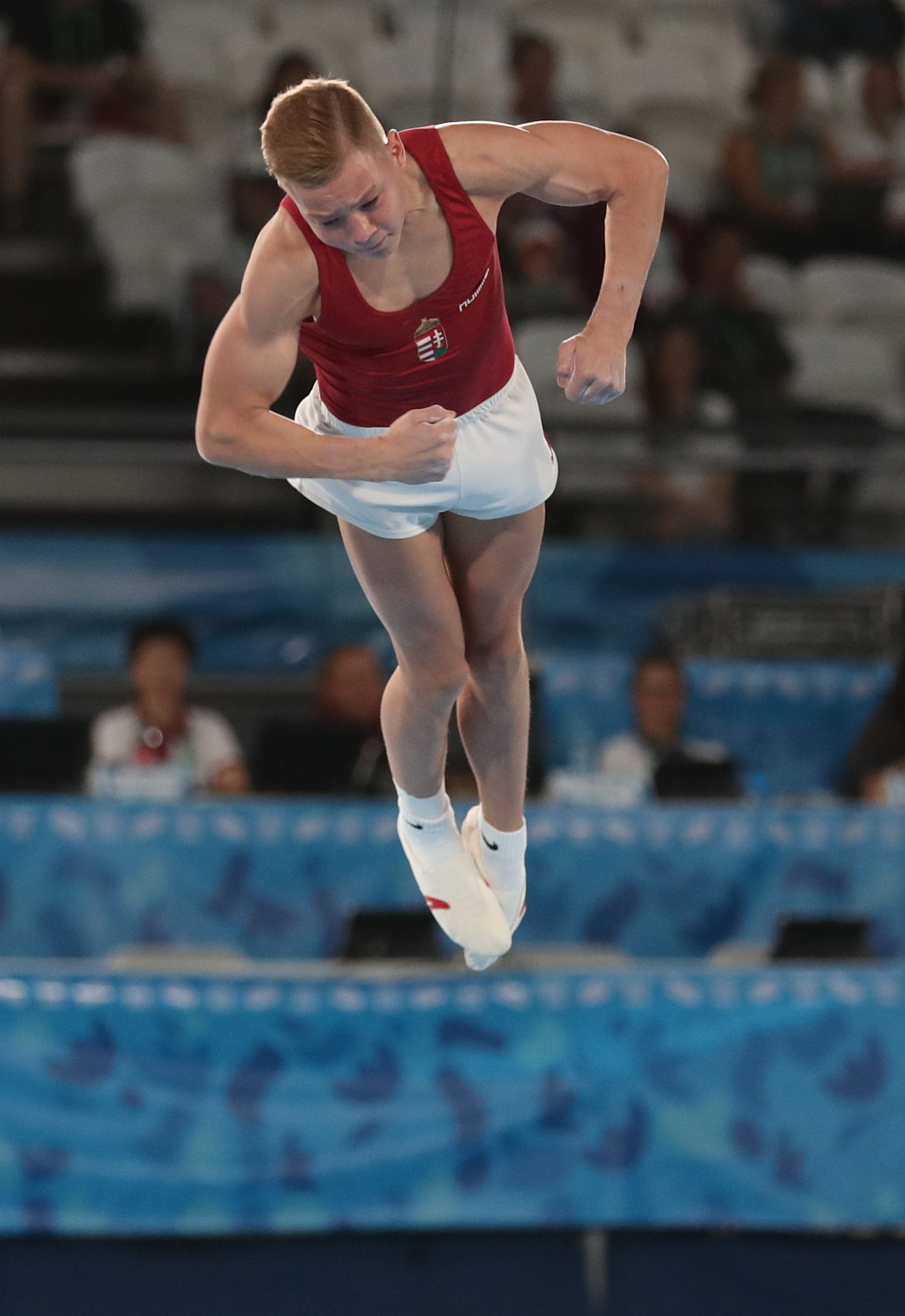
Krisztián Balázs

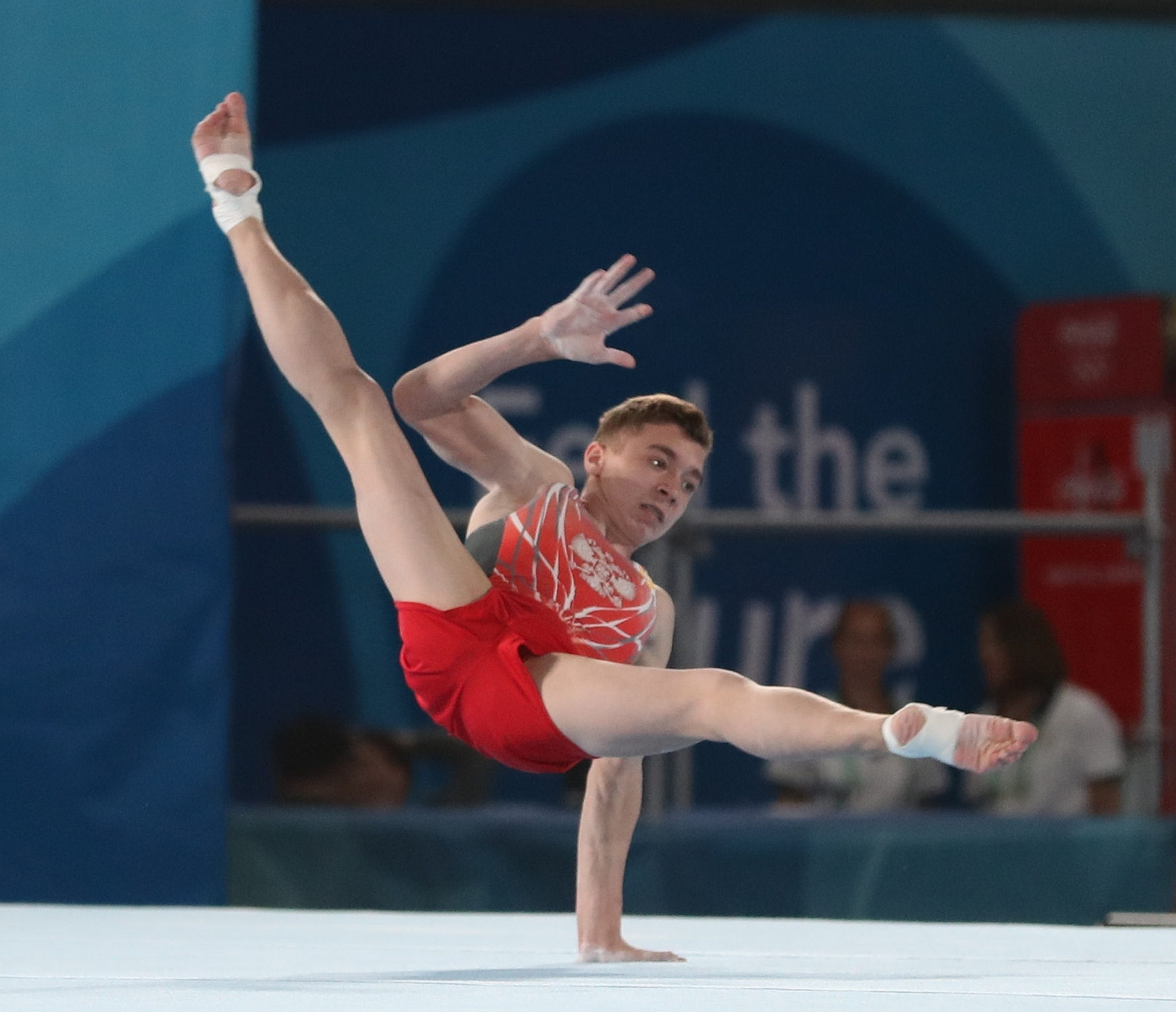
Sergei Naidin
