= Gymnastics at the 2018 Summer Youth Olympics – Boys' parallel bars =

Boys' parallel bars at the III Summer Youth Olympic Games
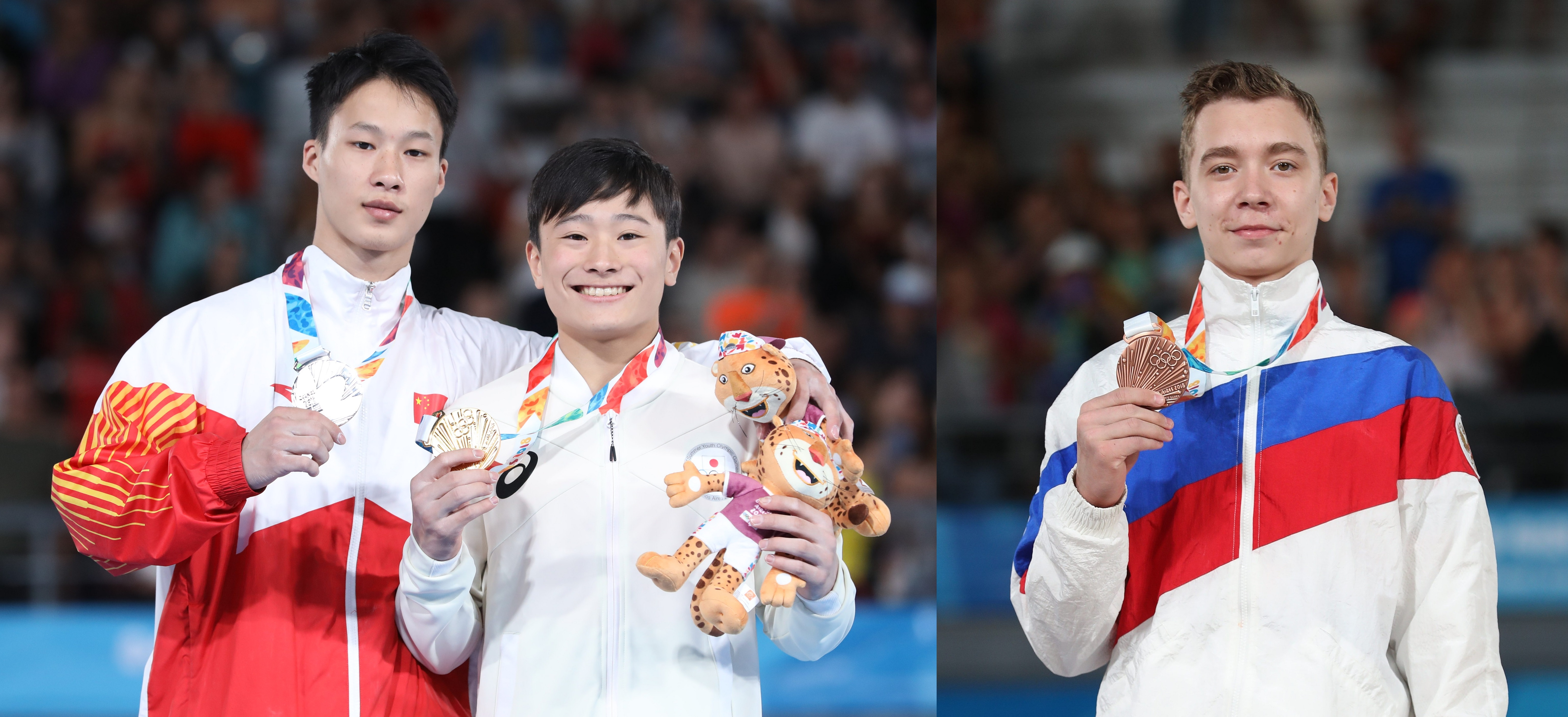
- Venue: America Pavilion
- Date: 15 October
- Competitors: 9 from 9 nations
- Winning score: 14.166

Medalists
1st place, gold medalist(s)		Takeru Kitazono	Japan
2nd place, silver medalist(s)		Yin Dehang	China
3rd place, bronze medalist(s)		Sergei Naidin	Russia

The boys' parallel bars competition at the 2018 Summer Youth Olympics was held at the America Pavilion on 15 October.

== Qualification ==
Rank	Gymnast	D Score	E Score	Pen.	Total	Qualification
1	Takeru Kitazono (JPN)	5.500	8.766		14.266	Q
2	Sergei Naidin (RUS)	5.100	8.833		13.933	Q
3	Nazar Chepurnyi (UKR)	5.200	8.633		13.833	Q
4	Yin Dehang (CHN)	5.200	8.366		13.566	Q
5	Krisztián Balázs (HUN)	4.800	8.600		13.400	Q
6	Ayan Moldagaliyev (KAZ)	4.400	8.966		13.366	Q
7	Adam Tobin (GBR)	4.500	8.841		13.341	Q
8	Nguyễn Văn Khánh Phong (VIE)	4.500	8.833		13.333	Q
9	Diogo Soares (BRA)	4.500	8.800		13.300	R1
10	Brandon Briones (USA)	4.700	8.566		13.266	R2
11	Lay Giannini (ITA)	4.300	8.933		13.233	R3

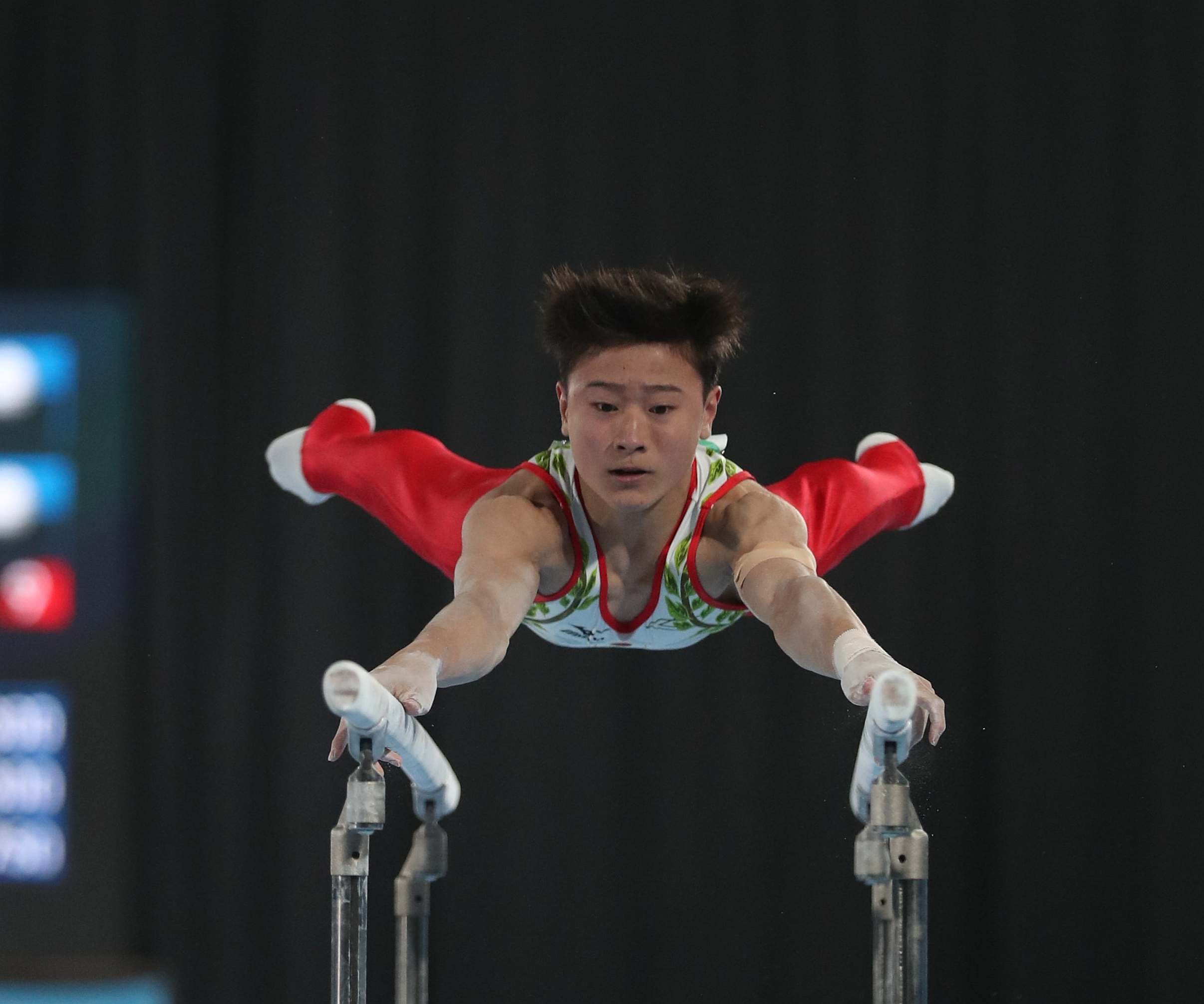
Takeru Kitazono

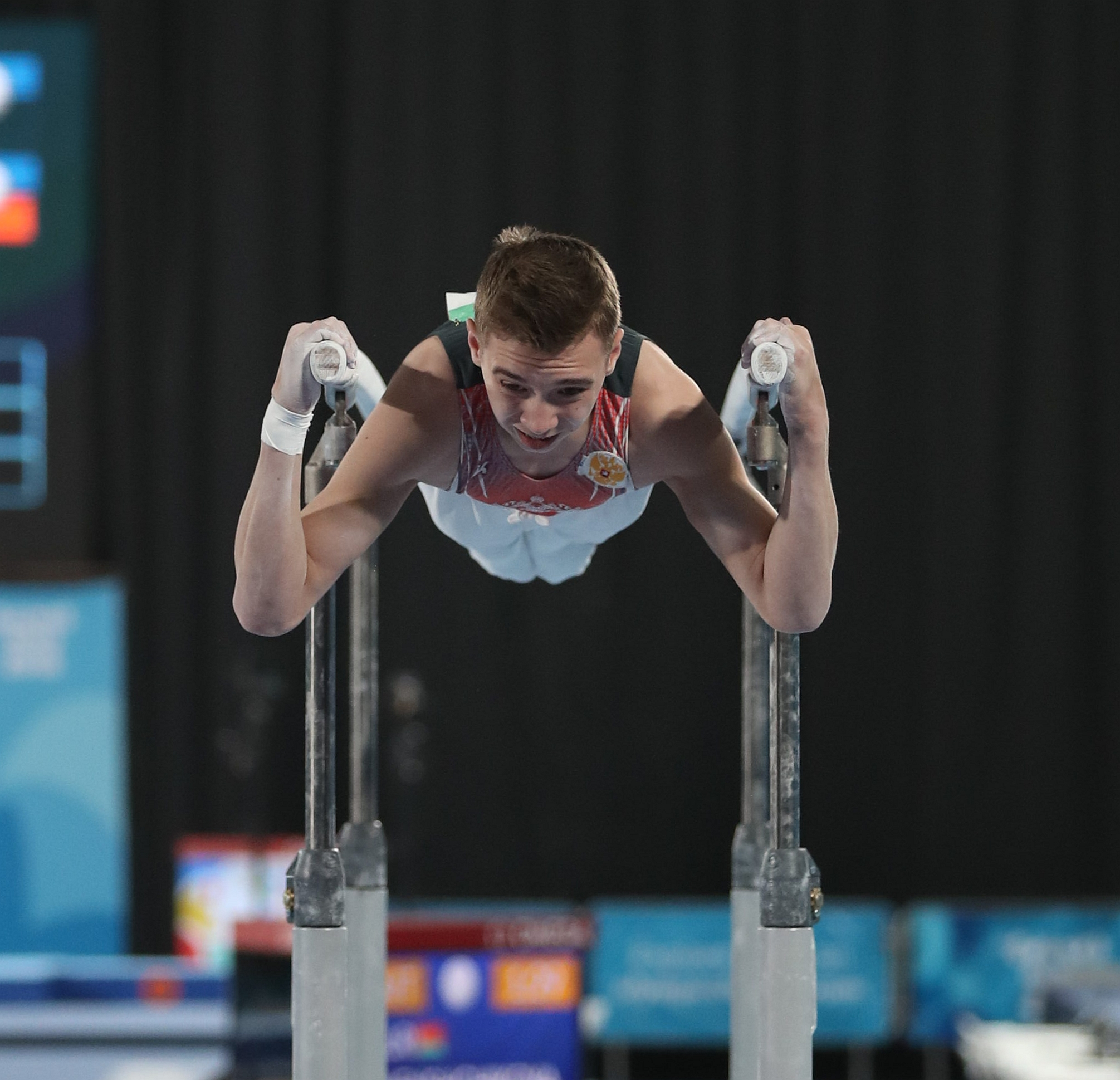
Sergei Naidin

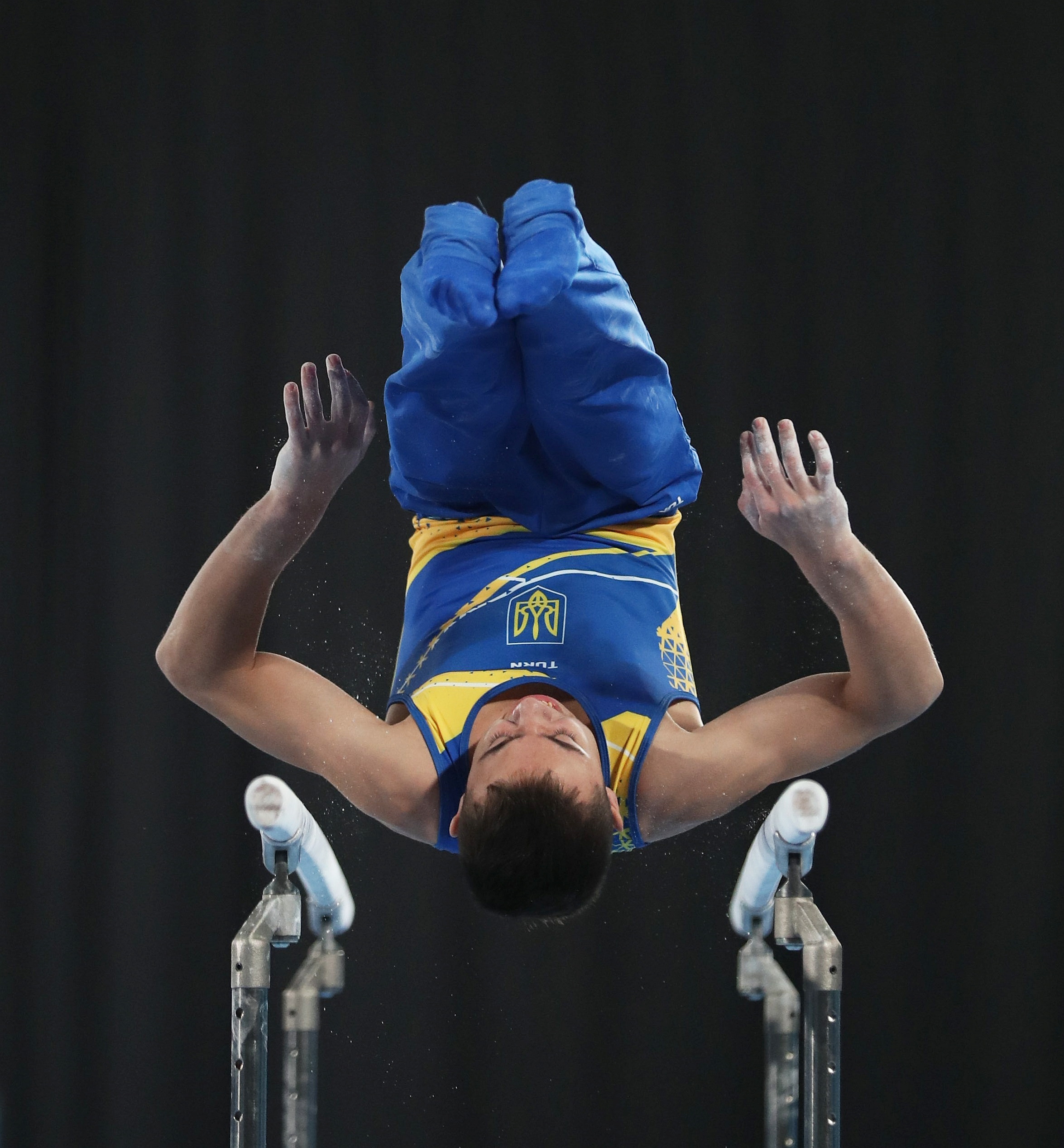
Nazar Chepurnyi

== Final ==
Rank	Gymnast	D Score	E Score	Pen.	Total
1st place, gold medalist(s)	Takeru Kitazono (JPN)	5.500	8.666		14.166
2nd place, silver medalist(s)	Yin Dehang (CHN)	5.300	8.500		13.800
3rd place, bronze medalist(s)	Sergei Naidin (RUS)	5.100	8.533		13.633
4	Nazar Chepurnyi (UKR)	5.200	8.266		13.466
5	Adam Tobin (GBR)	4.500	8.866		13.366
6	Ayan Moldagaliyev (KAZ)	4.400	8.700		13.100
7	Krisztián Balázs (HUN)	4.800	8.233		13.033
8	Nguyễn Văn Khánh Phong (VIE)	4.600	8.200		12.800
9	Diogo Soares (BRA)	4.900	6.325		11.225

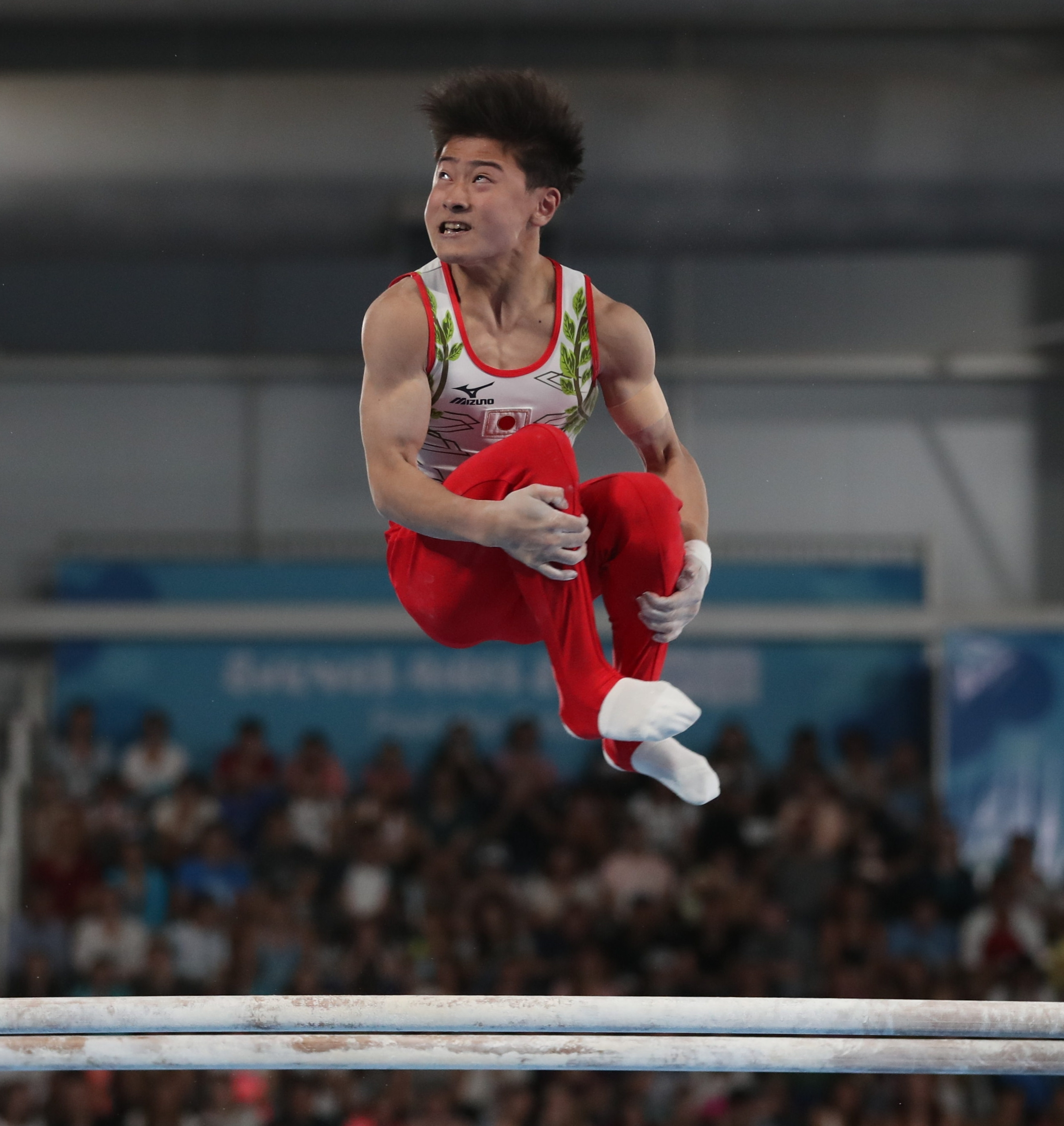
Takeru Kitazono

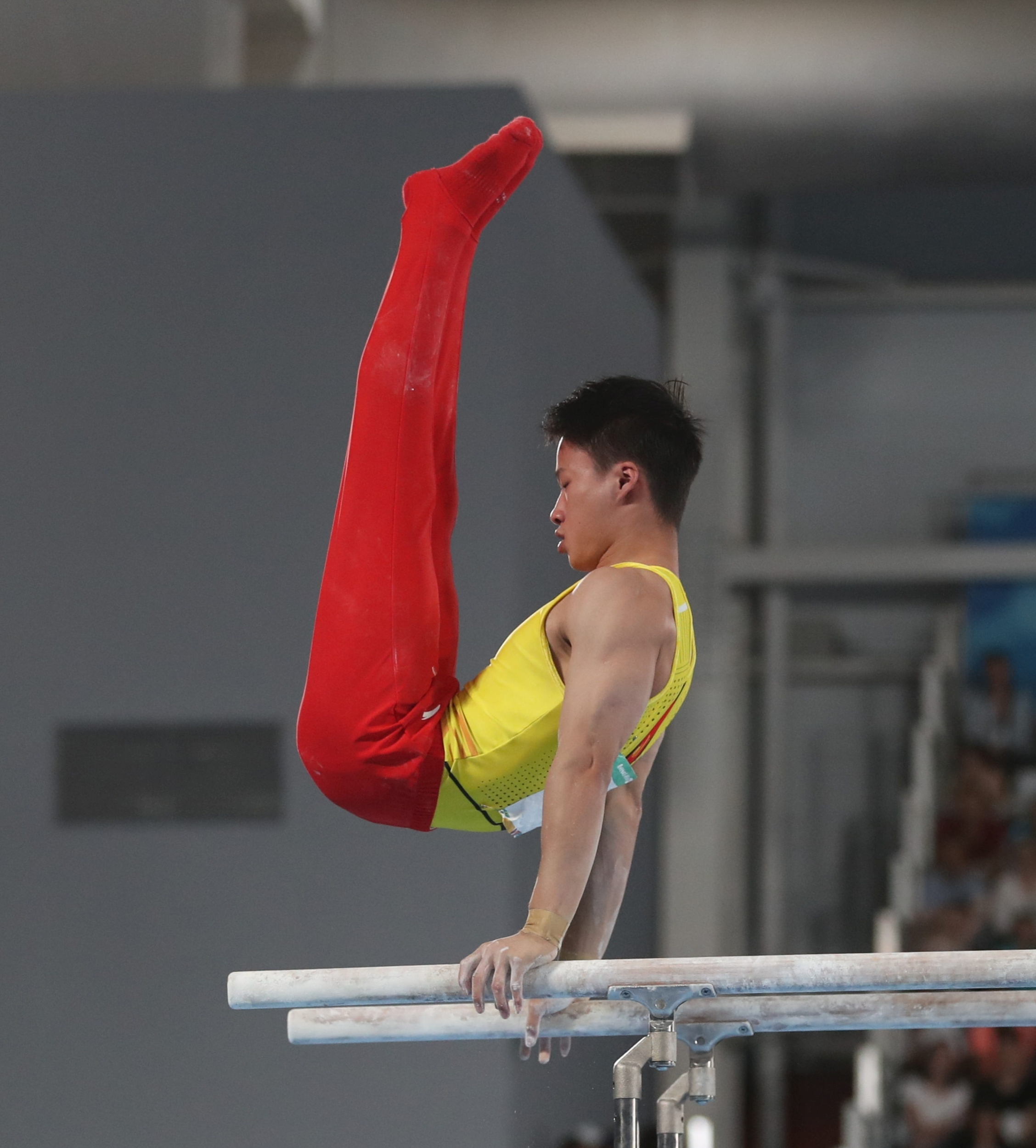
Yin Dehang

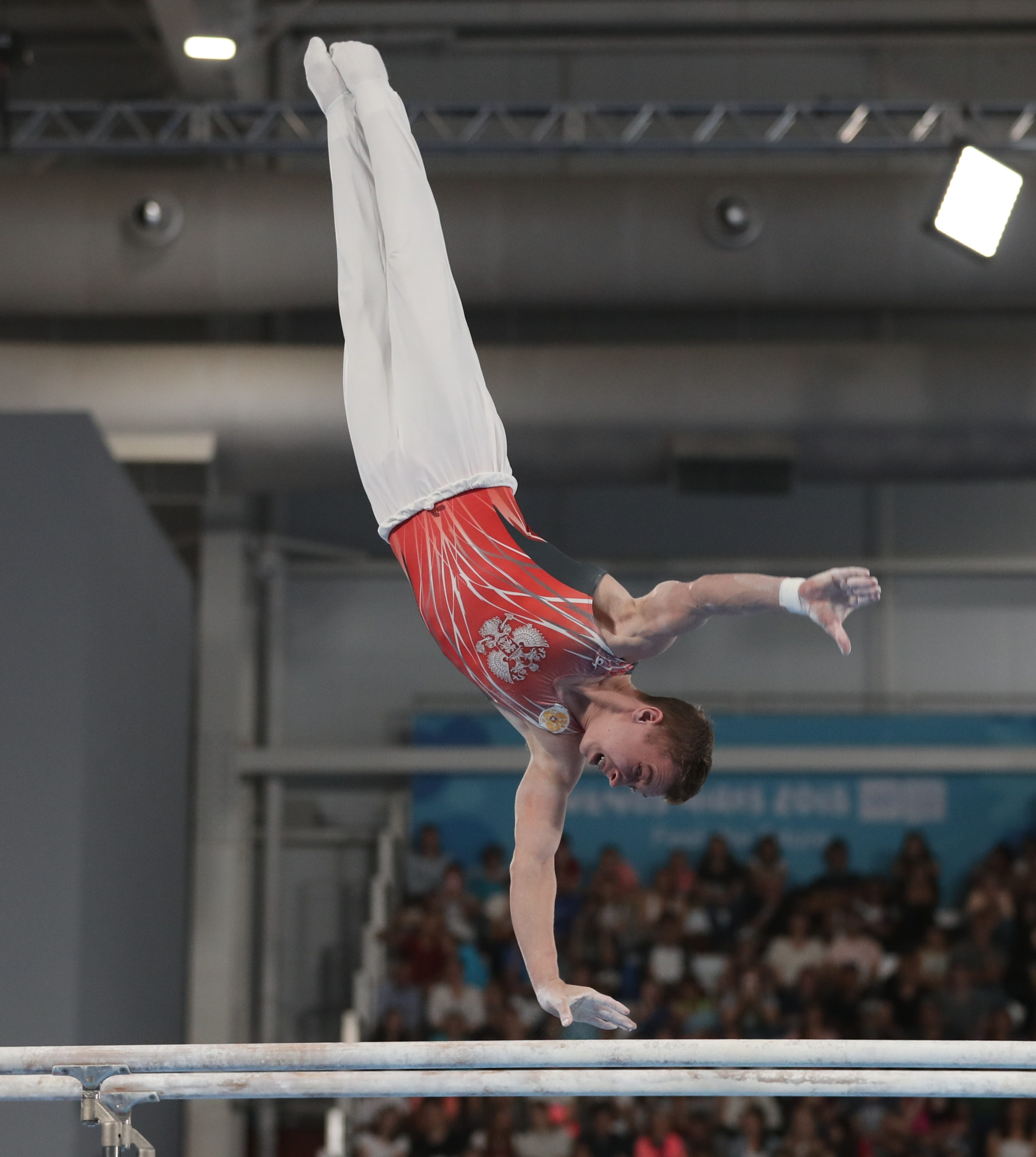
Sergei Naidin
