= Yin Dehang =

Chinese artistic gymnast

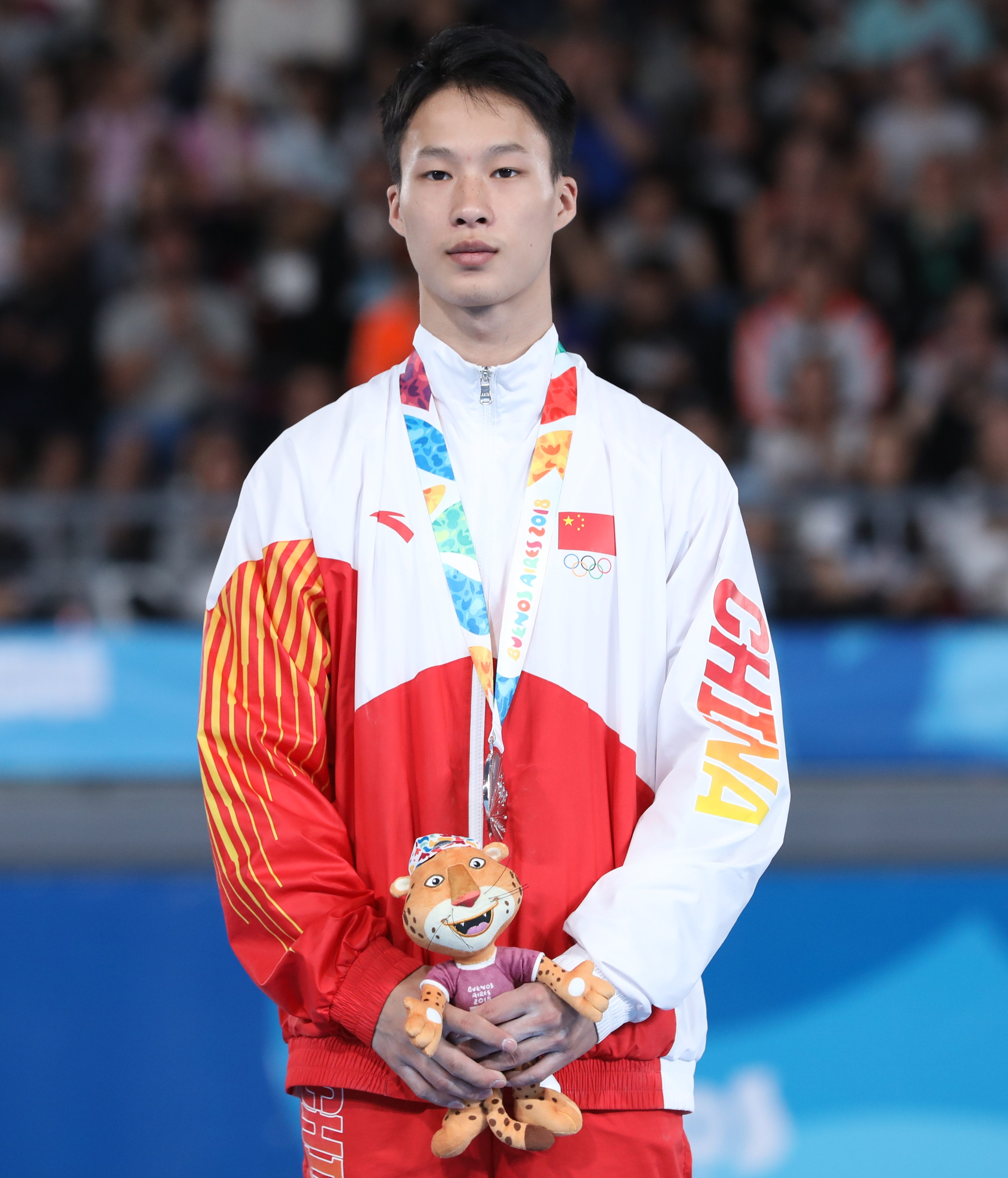
- Yin Dehang in 2018

Personal information
- Born: 8 January 2001 (age 25)

Gymnastics career
- Discipline: Men's artistic gymnastics
- Country represented: China
Medal record
Representing China
Men's artistic gymnastics
Asian Championships
Gold medal – first place	2022 Doha	Team
Gold medal – first place	2023 Singapore	Team
Gold medal – first place	2024 Tashkent	Team
Gold medal – first place	2024 Tashkent	Rings
Silver medal – second place	2024 Tashkent	Parallel Bars
Bronze medal – third place	2022 Doha	Pommel Horse
Bronze medal – third place	2022 Doha	Parallel Bars
Bronze medal – third place	2023 Singapore	Parallel Bars
Youth Olympic Games
Gold medal – first place	2018 Buenos Aires	Pommel horse
Silver medal – second place	2018 Buenos Aires	Parallel bars
Bronze medal – third place	2018 Buenos Aires	Rings

Yin Dehang (Chinese: 尹德行; born 8 January 2001) is a Chinese artistic gymnast. He won three medals at the 2018 Summer Youth Olympics held in Buenos Aires, Argentina. In the pommel horse event, he won the gold medal, and in the parallel bars event, he won the silver medal. He also won the bronze medal in the rings. In the floor exercise he did not qualify to compete in the final.

In 2019, he won the silver medal in the men's team event at the Chinese Artistic Gymnastics Championships held in Zhaoqing, Guangdong. In 2020, he won the gold medal in the men's team event at the Chinese Artistic Gymnastics Championships, also held in Zhaoqing, Guangdong.
