= Takeru Kitazono =

Japanese artistic gymnast

Kitazono Takeru
- 北園 丈琉
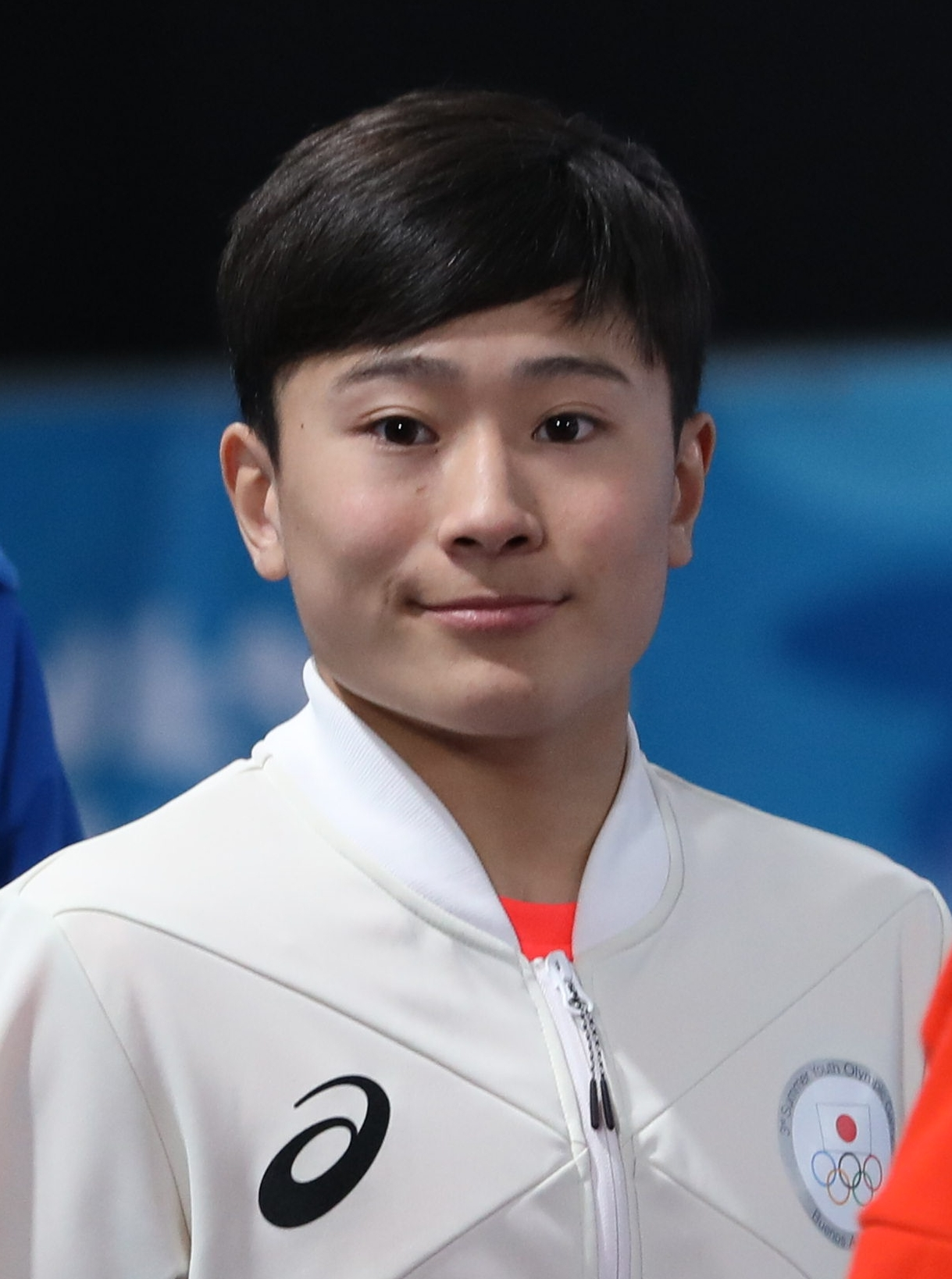
- Kitazono at the 2018 Summer Youth Olympics

Personal information
- Full name: Takeru Kitazono
- Born: October 21, 2002 (age 23) Osaka, Japan
- Height: 1.54 m (5 ft 1 in)

Gymnastics career
- Discipline: Men's artistic gymnastics
- Country represented: Japan; (2017–present)
- Club: Seifu High School
- Gym: Tokushukai
- Head coaches: Isao Yoneda; Hisashi Mizutori
- Former coach: Hideki Umemoto
Medal record
Men's artistic gymnastics
Representing Japan
Olympic Games
Silver medal – second place	2020 Tokyo	Team
Asian Games
Silver medal – second place	2022 Hangzhou	Team
Silver medal – second place	2022 Hangzhou	All-Around
Silver medal – second place	2022 Hangzhou	Parallel Bars
Asian Championships
Silver medal – second place	2023 Singapore	Team
Bronze medal – third place	2023 Singapore	All-Around
Junior World Championships
Gold medal – first place	2019 Győr	Team
Gold medal – first place	2019 Győr	Pommel Horse
Gold medal – first place	2019 Győr	Parallel Bars
Youth Olympic Games
Gold medal – first place	2018 Buenos Aires	All-Around
Gold medal – first place	2018 Buenos Aires	Floor Exercise
Gold medal – first place	2018 Buenos Aires	Rings
Gold medal – first place	2018 Buenos Aires	Parallel Bars
Gold medal – first place	2018 Buenos Aires	Horizontal Bar
Representing (International Olympic Committee) Mixed-NOCs
Youth Olympic Games
Silver medal – second place	2018 Buenos Aires	Mixed team

Takeru Kitazono (北園 丈琉, Kitazono Takeru; born 21 October 2002) is a Japanese male artistic gymnast. At the 2018 Youth Olympic Games in Buenos Aires, Argentina, he won five gold medals in the all-around, floor, rings, parallel bars, and horizontal bar competitions. He was the first artistic gymnast ever to achieve such a feat in a single Youth Olympic Games. He represented Japan at the 2020 Summer Olympics where he won a silver medal in the team event.

== Personal life ==
Kitazono was born on 21 October 2002 in Osaka, Japan. He started gymnastics when he was three years old after his mother enrolled him in a nearby gym because he was fascinated with a Japanese superhero television series Kamen Rider Hibiki.

Kitazono has received two awards. At the 2018 Japanese Olympic Committee Sports Awards, he received a Rookie Award. In 2019, he received Big Sports Rookie Award at the 53rd TV Asahi Big Sports Awards.

== Gymnastics career ==
=== 2017 ===
In 2017, Kitazono fractured his left ankle during training. The injury was still troubling him at the national trials for the 2018 Youth Olympic Games in Buenos Aires, Argentina.

=== 2018 ===
Kitazono was selected to represent Japan at the third Youth Olympic Games. While there he won an unprecedented five gold medals – in the all-around, floor exercise, rings, parallel bars, and horizontal bar – beating the previous record of three gold medals won by Nikita Nagornyy and Giarnni Regini-Moran at the 2014 Youth Olympic Games. He finished sixth on pommel horse. In addition to his five gold medals, Kitazono also received a silver medal in the mixed multi-discipline team (teams were randomly composed of gymnasts from various countries and various disciplines). Kitazono was assigned to the team named after British gymnast Max Whitlock.

Kitazono later competed at the All-Japan Team Championships where he helped his club finish seventh.

=== 2019 ===
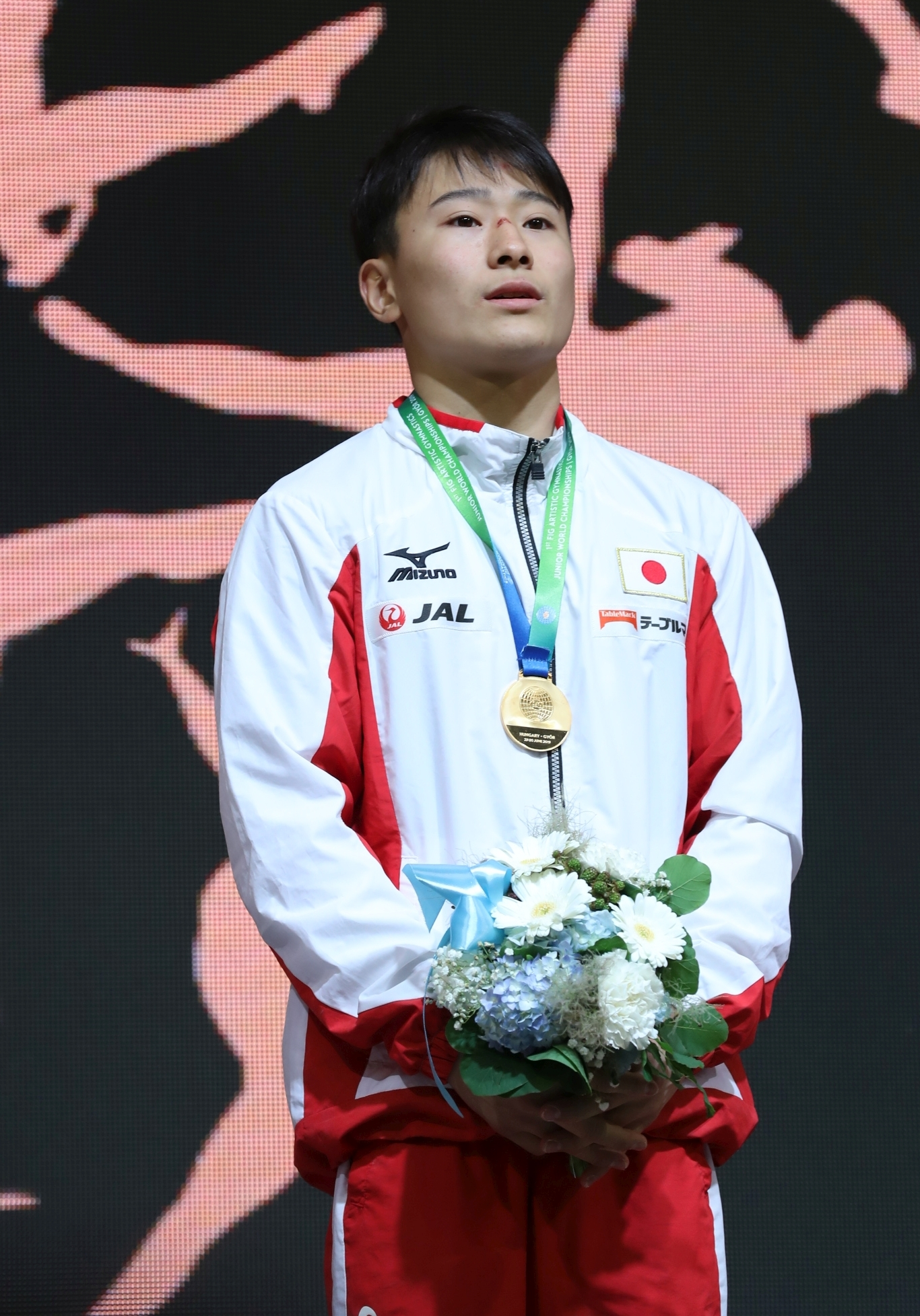
Kitazono at a 2019 Junior World Artistic Gymnastics Championships victory ceremony.

In January, Kitazono competed at the RD761 Junior International Cup where he helped Japan win gold, and individually, he placed first on the all-around, pommel horse, rings and parallel bars, and he placed seventh on the horizontal bar as well as sixth on floor exercise.

Kitazono was selected to represent Japan at the inaugural Junior World Championships alongside Ryosuke Doi and Shinnosuke Oka. While there the team won gold in the team final finishing nearly 3 points ahead of second place Ukraine. Although Kitazono recorded the third-highest all-around score of the day, he was left off the podium due to both teammates scoring higher and the two-per-country rule taking place. During event finals he won gold on pommel horse and parallel bars and placed seventh on floor exercise.

=== 2021 ===
In April, Kitazono damaged the ligaments in both elbows while competing on the horizontal bar at the All-Japan Championships, their national selection trials for the 2020 Olympic Games at home in Tokyo.

At the 2020 Summer Olympics in Tokyo, Kitazono, 18, competed as part of Team Japan's relatively young men's team on team event that also included Daiki Hashimoto, 19, Kazuma Kaya, 24, and Kakeru Tanigawa, 22, with none having any past Olympic experience. With a completely new roster, no former Olympic male gymnast of Japan returned to lead team event. Kitazono would later win the Olympic team silver in the men's team all-around competition. The team posted a total score of 262.397, which was only 0.103 behind the winning Russian Olympic Committee team. If Japan had managed to secure team gold at these home Games, Kitazono would have broken the record and become Japan's youngest male gymnast in history to win Olympic gold. He would have been 18 years, 9 months and 5 days old. The record is currently being held by Kenzō Shirai at 19 years, 11 months and 15 days old, who also became the first ever Japanese male teenage gymnast to win Olympic gold when Japan took team gold at the 2016 Games. Hashimoto, who was only 6 days older than Shirai, joined him as Japan's second (youngest) male teenage gymnast to win Olympic gold after winning the individual all-around title in 2021. Shirai broke the long-standing record of Eizo Kenmotsu, who won team gold as a 20-year-8-month-and-11-day-old nearly 49 years ago at the 1968 Games.
