= Jessica Pickering =

Australian trampoline gymnast

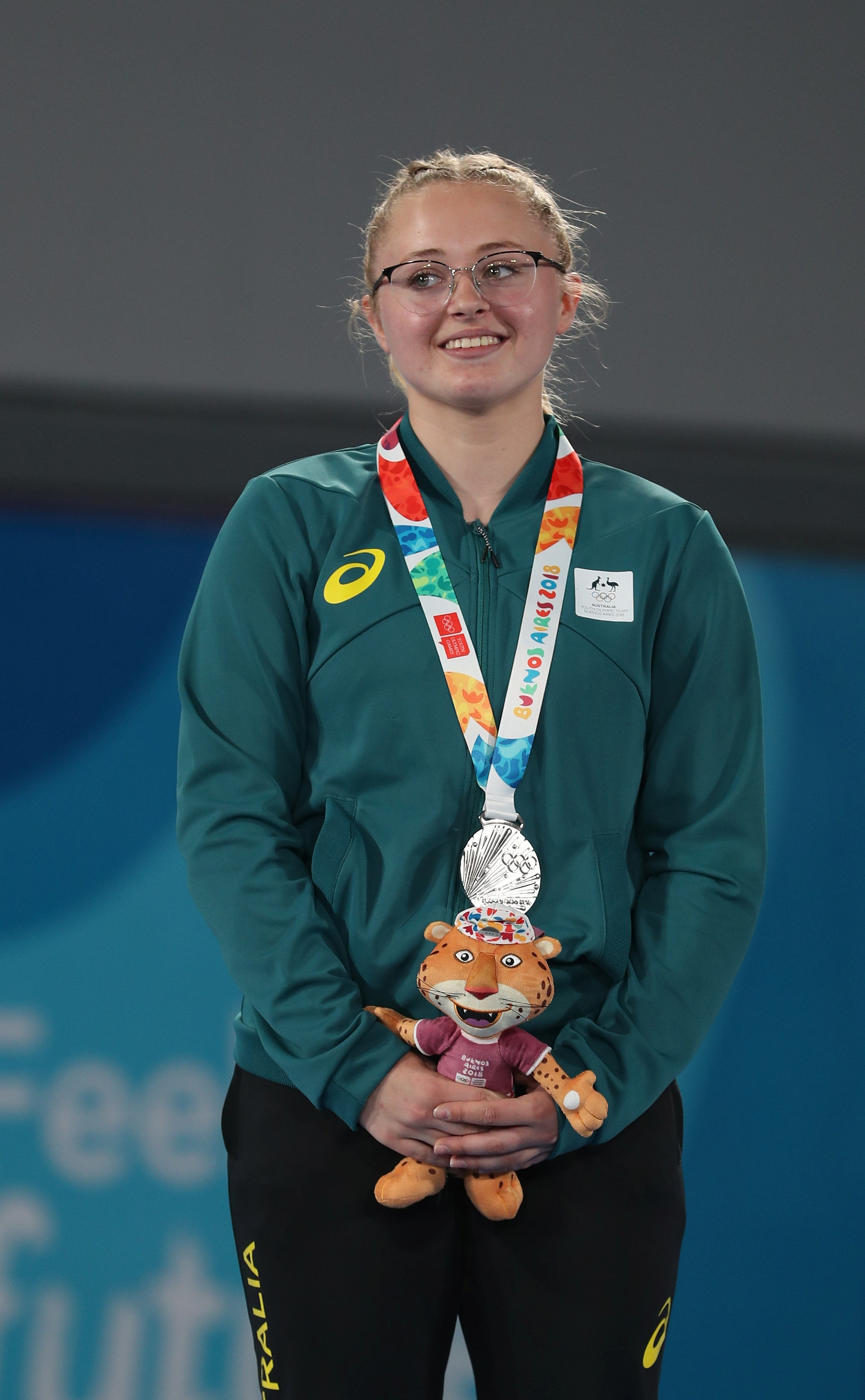
- Pickering at the 2018 Summer Youth Olympics

Personal information
- Nickname: Jess
- Born: 24 April 2001 (age 25) North Gosford, New South Wales
- Height: 164 cm (5 ft 5 in)

Gymnastics career
- Discipline: Trampoline gymnastics
- Country represented: Australia
- Club: Eastlake Trampoline Sports
- Head coaches: Brett Austine; Christine Swadling
Medal record
Women's trampoline gymnastics
Representing Australia
Youth Olympic Games
| Silver medal – second place | 2018 Buenos Aires | Individual |

Jessica Pickering (born 24 April 2001) is an Australian trampoline gymnast. She is the 2018 Summer Youth Olympics individual silver medalist and a competitor at the 2020 Summer Olympics.

== Biography ==
Pickering started trampoline gymnastics when she was seven years old. Her mother feared for her on the trampoline at home and persuaded her to join Eastlake Trampoline Sports Club. She is still with the same club.

At the 2018 Pacific Rim Championships, Pickering won a silver medal in the junior synchro event alongside Britney Glazebrook. Additionally, she finished fourth in the individual event. She then represented Australia at the 2018 Summer Youth Olympics and qualified to the individual final in second place. She went on to win the silver medal in the final, behind China's Fan Xinyi. She competed with Imogen Florian at the 2018 World Age Group Competition and finished fourth in the synchro competition in the 17-21 age group.

Pickering stopped competing at the junior level and made her senior debut in 2019. At the 2019 Khabarovsk World Cup, she won a silver medal in the synchro competition alongside Lauren Sampson. Pickering and Sampson also won the synchro silver medal at the Valladolid World Cup. They then qualified for the synchro final at the 2019 World Championships and finished fifth, and were later bumped up to fourth after Camilla Gomes was disqualified for a doping violation.

Pickering finished fifth in the individual event at the 2021 Brescia World Cup. She won a silver medal in the synchro event with new partner Kira Ward at the Anadia World Cup. She represented Australia at the 2020 Summer Olympics. She was ranked 16th and last in the qualification round after making errors in both routines.

Pickering won a bronze medal in the synchro event with Abbie Watts at the 2023 Palm Beach World Cup.
