= 2018 Asian Trampoline Gymnastics Championships =

International gymnastics competition

The 2018 Asian Trampoline Gymnastics Championships was held at the University of Makati in Makati, Metro Manila, Philippines, May 19–20, 2018. It was the fourth edition of the competition overall and the second edition to feature senior level events.

The tournament was contested by about 100 athletes from 10 nations. The competition was organized by the Gymnastics Association of the Philippines and was approved by the International Gymnastics Federation. Nations with medallists in the junior level events qualified a berth for the 2018 Summer Youth Olympics in Buenos Aires, Argentina.

== Participating nations ==
- China
- Hong Kong
- India
- Iran
- Japan
- Kazakhstan
- North Korea
- Philippines
- Uzbekistan
- Vietnam

== Medal winners ==
Event	Gold	Silver	Bronze
Senior men	Pirmammad Aliyev; Kazakhstan	Kim Yun-song; North Korea	Daniyar Tussupov; Kazakhstan
Senior women	Shivani Dound; India	Siddhi Brid; India	Erin Abaniel; Philippines
Junior men	Takumi Fujimoto; Japan	Hayato Miyano; Japan	Wu Wei; China
Junior women	Fan Xinyi; China	Yan Junyi; China	Serina Masuzaki; Japan

== Results ==
=== Senior ===
Final - Men

Rank	Athlete	Execution	Difficulty	Horizontal Displacement	Flight	Penalty	Total
1st place, gold medalist(s)	Pirmammad Aliyev (KAZ)	17.0	13.6	9.65	16.385	0.0	56.635
2nd place, silver medalist(s)	Kim Yun-song (PRK)	14.3	15.0	9.25	14.495	0.0	53.045
3rd place, bronze medalist(s)	Daniyar Tussupov (KAZ)	14.6	10.1	8.55	15.930	0.0	49.180
4	Amir Farahani (IRI)	12.2	11.5	8.70	14.850	0.0	47.250
5	Abhijit Nimbalkar (IND)	13.1	8.2	9.70	13.850	0.0	44.850
6	Amirreza Mesgari Hagh (IRI)	12.3	10.1	8.00	14.255	0.0	44.655
7	Lee Kwun Wai (HKG)	15.0	5.3	9.40	14.945	0.0	44.645
8	Benjamin Jesus Mendoza (PHI)	3.8	3.0	2.60	4.230	0.0	13.630
Source:Sport Tech

Final - Women

Rank	Athlete	Execution	Difficulty	Horizontal Displacement	Flight	Penalty	Total
1st place, gold medalist(s)	Shivani Dound (IND)	11.7	4.1	8.90	10.935	0.0	35.635
2nd place, silver medalist(s)	Siddhi Brid (IND)	10.6	2.1	8.35	7.465	0.0	28.515
3rd place, bronze medalist(s)	Erin Abaniel (PHI)	4.0	1.2	2.70	3.800	0.0	11.700
Source:Sport Tech
