= Gymnastics at the 2018 Summer Youth Olympics – Girls' trampoline =

Girls’ trampoline at the III Summer Youth Olympic Games
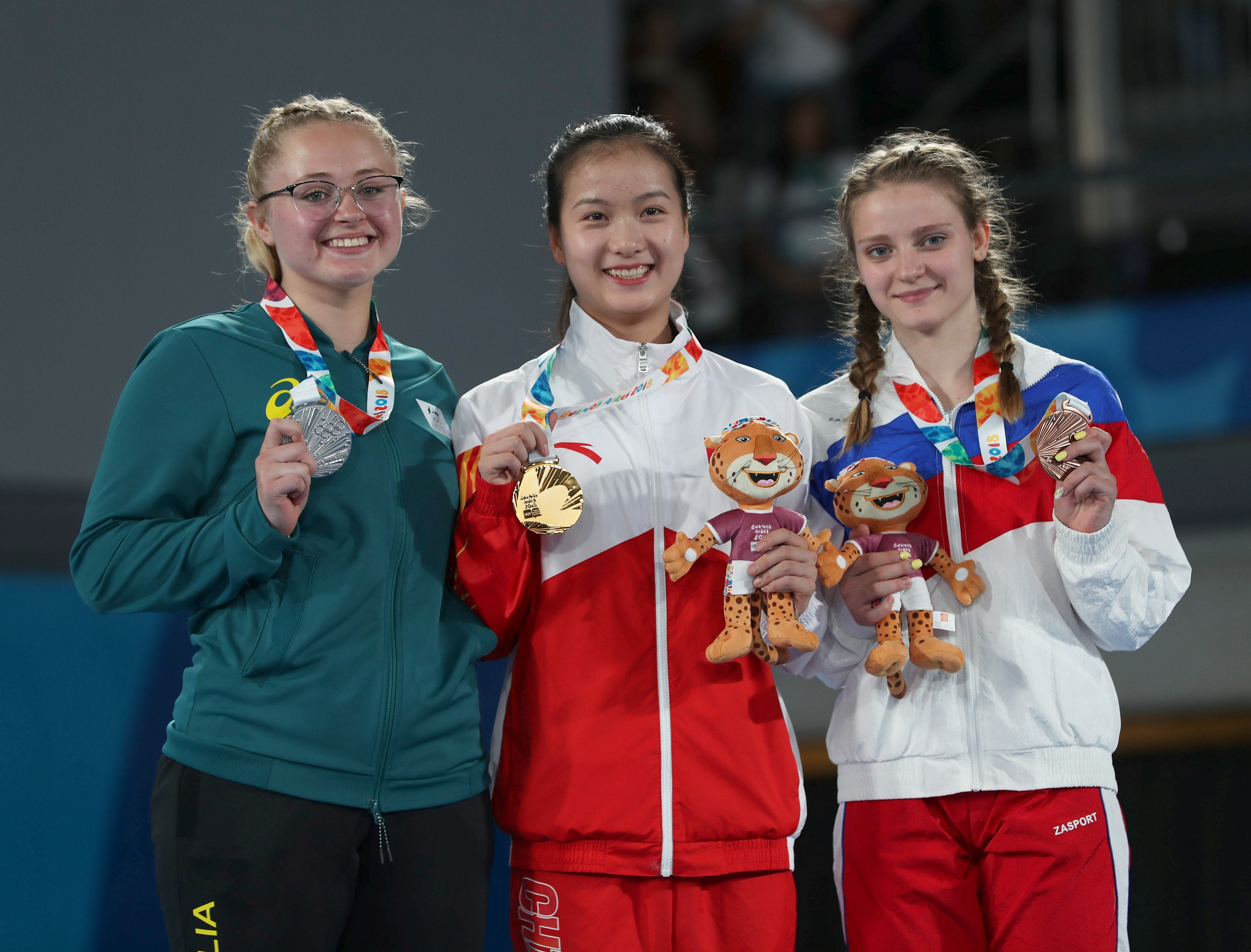
- Victory ceremony (from left to right): Jessica Pickering (Silver), Fan Xinyi (Gold), Vera Beliankina (Bronze)
- Venue: America Pavilion
- Dates: 8 October (qualification); 14 October (final)
- Competitors: 12 from 12 nations
- Winning score: 52.560

Medalists
1st place, gold medalist(s)		Fan Xinyi	China
2nd place, silver medalist(s)		Jessica Pickering	Australia
3rd place, bronze medalist(s)		Vera Beliankina	Russia

The girls’ trampoline competition at the 2018 Summer Youth Olympics was held on 8 and 14 October at the America Pavilion in Buenos Aires, Argentina.

== Results ==
=== Qualification ===
Rank	Athlete	1st Routine		2nd Routine		Total	Notes
Rank	Athlete	Score	Rank	Score	Rank	Total	Notes
1	Fan Xinyi (CHN)	44.335	1	54.765	1	99.100	Q
2	Jessica Pickering (AUS)	42.045	8	52.205	2	94.250	Q
3	Emily Mussmann (SUI)	42.585	4	51.050	3	93.635	Q
4	Marina Chavarría (ESP)	42.315	6	51.025	4	93.340	Q
5	Vera Beliankina (RUS)	43.470	2	49.825	7	93.295	Q
6	Yuki Okuno (JPN)	42.440	5	50.395	5	92.835	Q
7	Jessica Clarke (GBR)	42.230	7	50.210	6	92.440	Q
8	Alyssa Oh (USA)	43.040	3	49.160	9	92.200	Q
9	Antonia Sakellaridou (GRE)	41.490	10	49.825	7	91.315	R1
10	Michelle Mares (MEX)	41.755	9	48.675	10	90.430	R2
11	Thalia Loveira (NAM)	38.690	12	44.840	11	83.530	
12	Yekaterina Lukina (KAZ)	41.480	11	10.260	12	51.740	

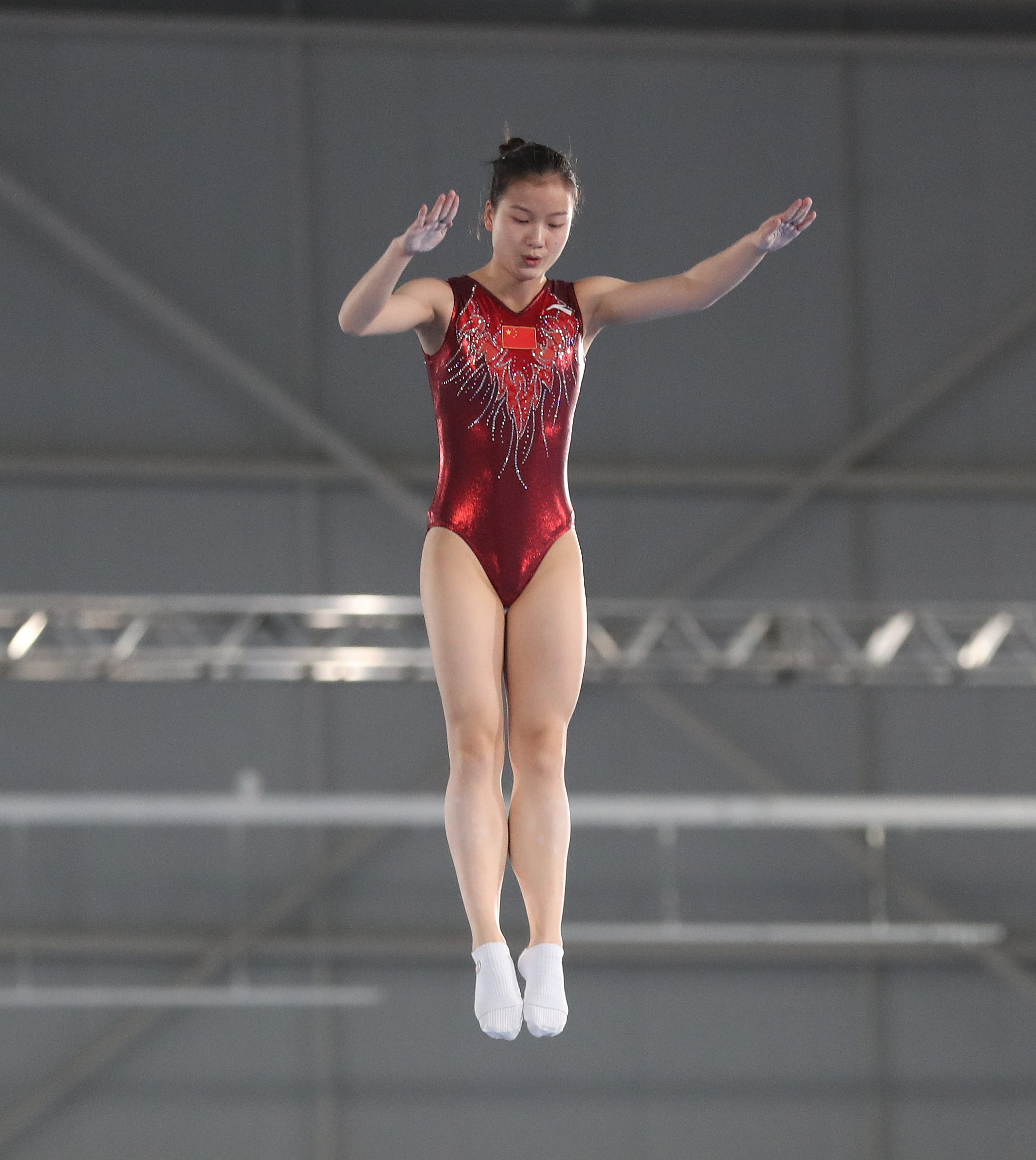
Fan Xinyi

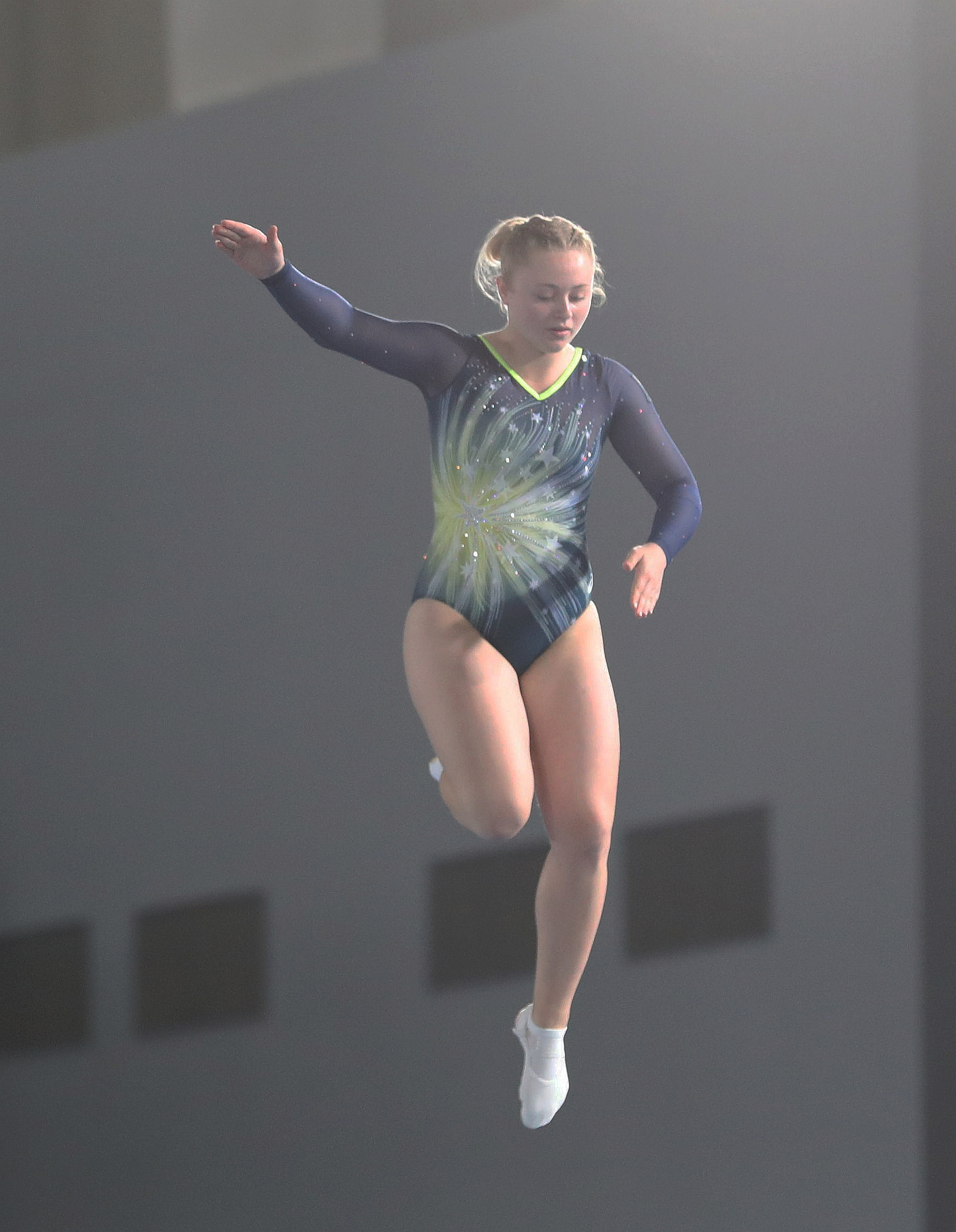
Jessica Pickering

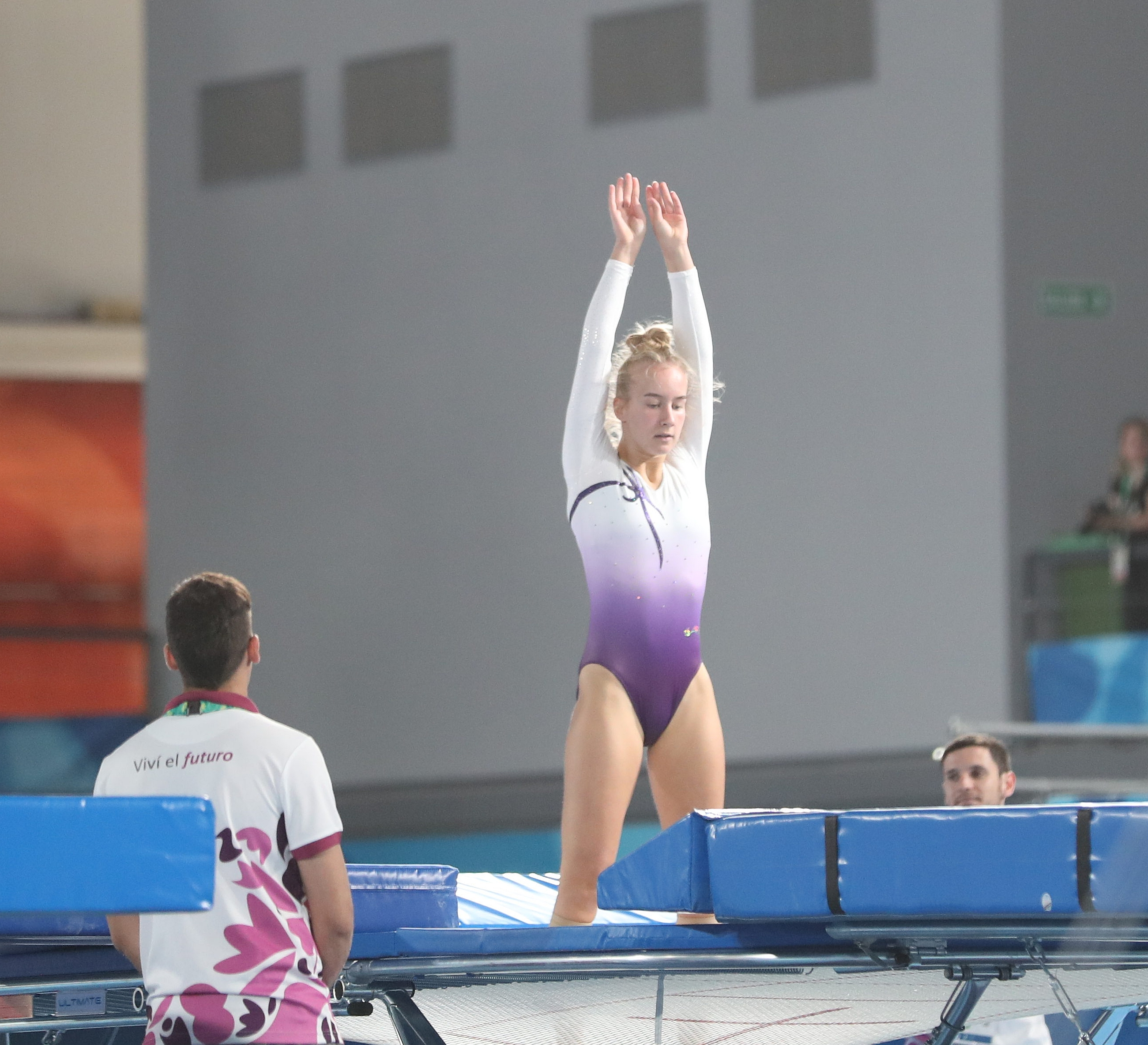
Emily Mussmann

=== Final ===
Rank	Athlete	D Score	E Score	T Score	H Score	Penalty	Total
1st place, gold medalist(s)	Fan Xinyi (CHN)	12.300	14.400	16.360	9.500		52.560
2nd place, silver medalist(s)	Jessica Pickering (AUS)	13.300	14.600	14.845	9.100	-0.200	51.645
3rd place, bronze medalist(s)	Vera Beliankina (RUS)	12.600	14.500	15.135	9.200		51.435
4	Marina Chavarría (ESP)	11.200	15.900	14.985	8.900		50.985
5	Yuki Okuno (JPN)	10.400	16.500	14.760	9.100		50.760
6	Jessica Clarke (GBR)	10.500	15.000	14.510	9.400		49.410
7	Emily Mussmann (SUI)	8.000	16.300	15.155	9.400		48.855
8	Alyssa Oh (USA)	5.900	8.000	9.010	5.300		28.210

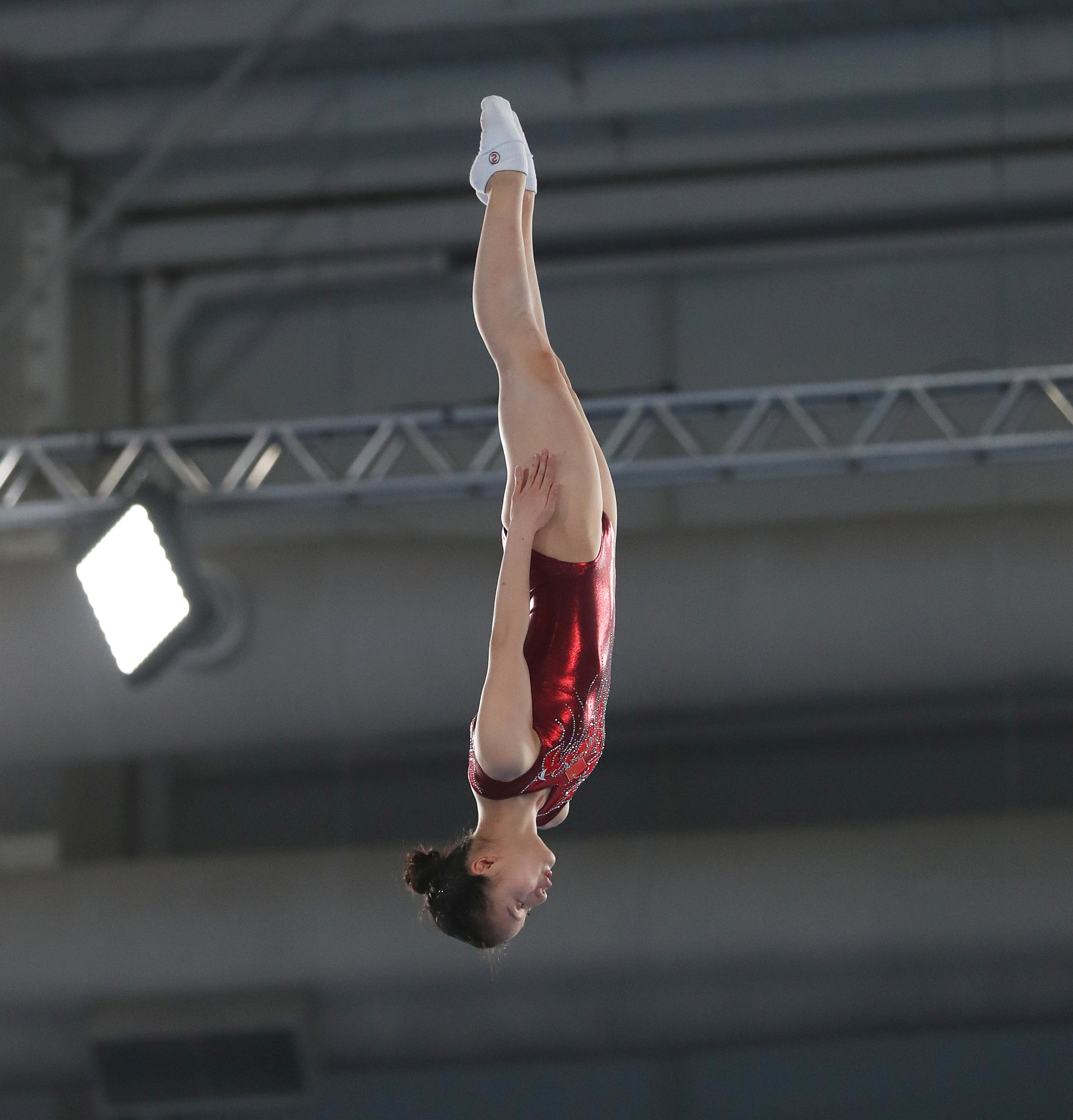
Fan Xinyi

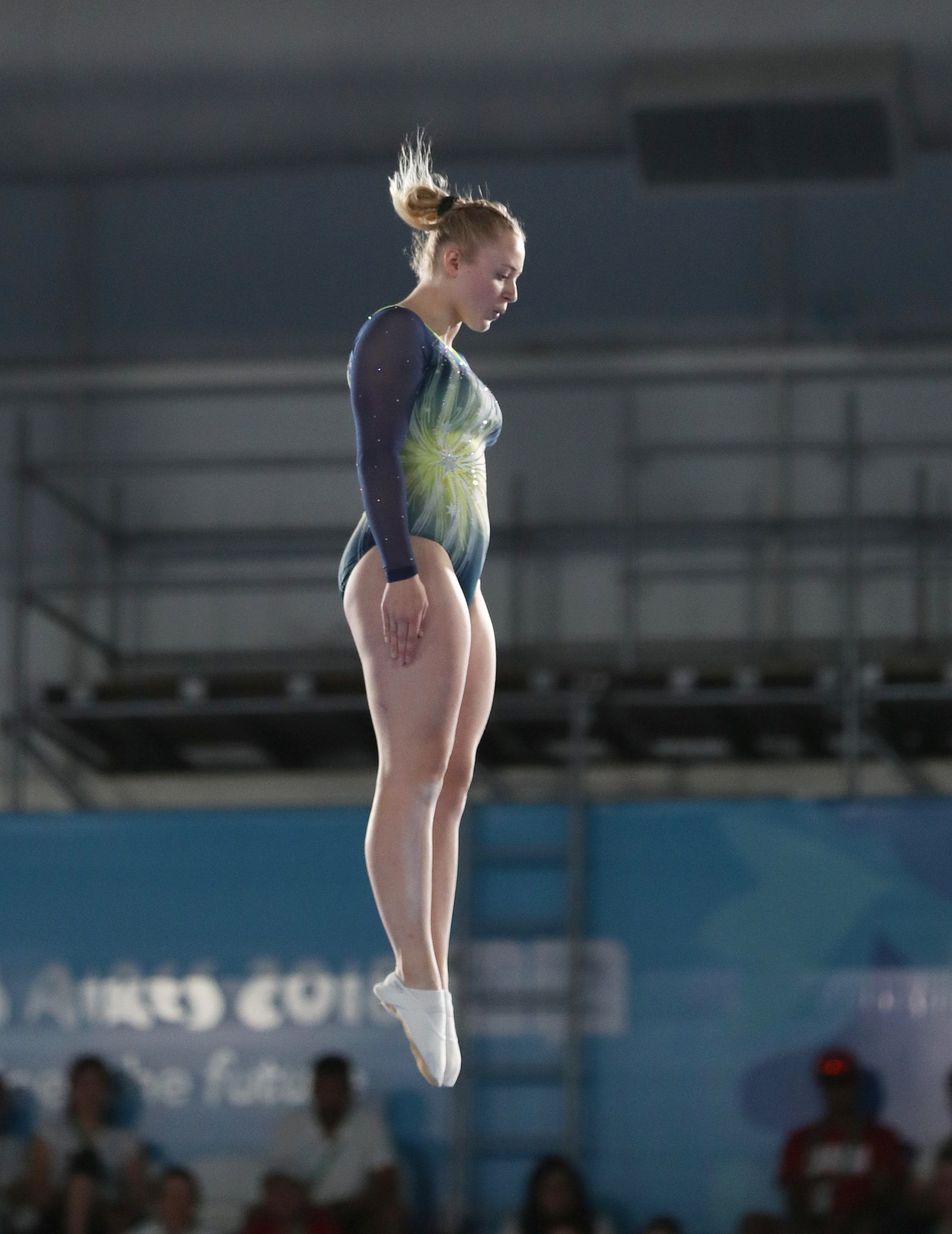
Jessica Pickering

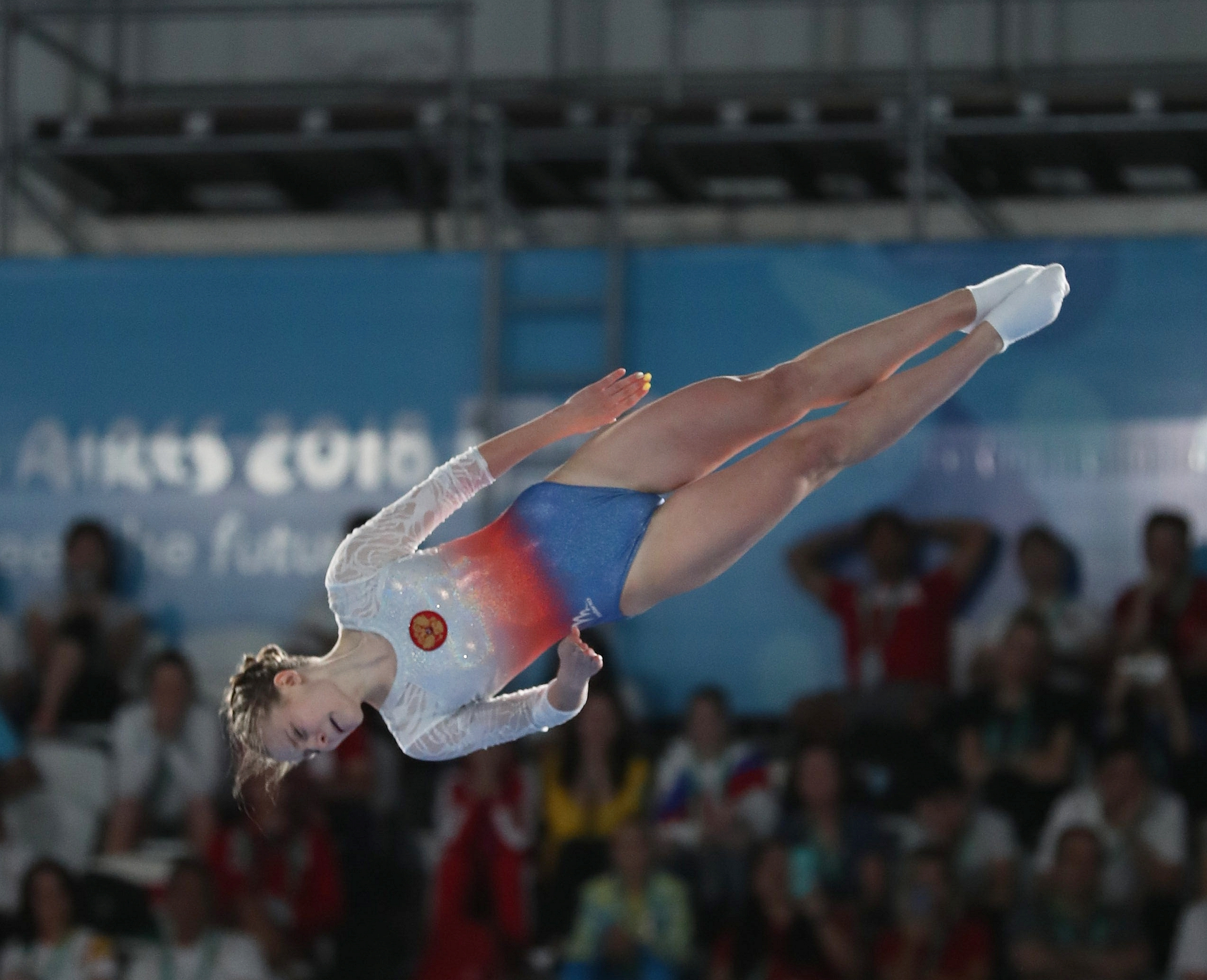
Vera Beliankina

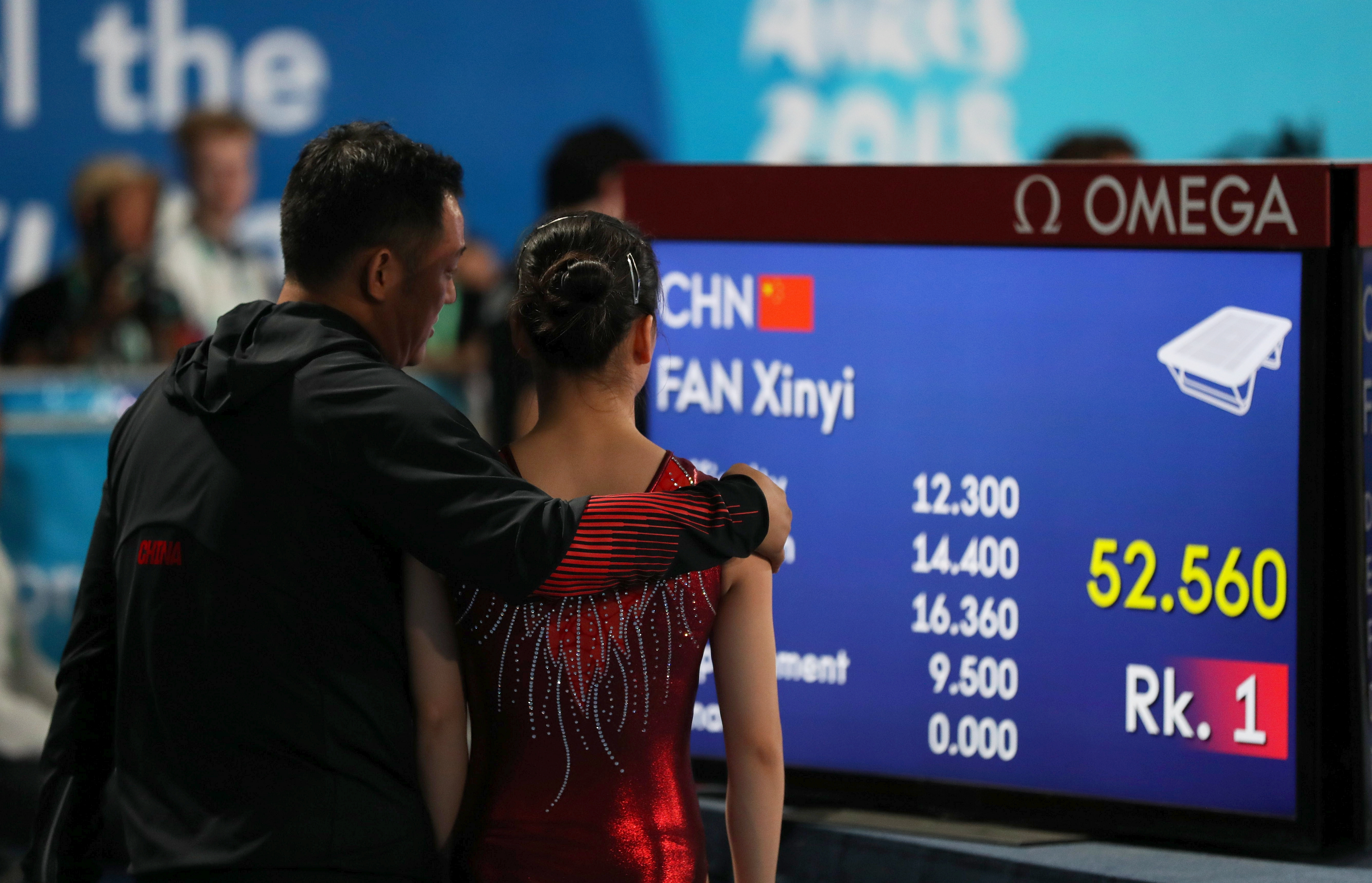
Fan Xinyi waiting for her final result
