= Gymnastics at the 2018 Summer Youth Olympics =

Gymnastics at the III Summer Youth Olympic Games
- Venue: America Pavilion
- Dates: 7–16 October
- No. of events: 17 (8 boys, 7 girls, 2 mixed)

Gymnastics at the 2018 Summer Youth Olympics was held from 7 to 16 October at the America Pavilion in Buenos Aires, Argentina.

== Qualification ==
=== Summary ===
Nation	Acrobatic	Artistic		Rhythmic	Trampoline		Total
Nation	Mixed	Men's	Women's	Individual	Men's	Women's	Total
Algeria			1		1		2
Armenia				1			1
Argentina		1	1	1	1		4
Austria					1		1
Australia			1	1	1	1	4
Azerbaijan		1		1			2
Belarus	2		1	1	1		5
Belgium		1					1
Bolivia				1			1
Brazil		1	1	1			3
Bulgaria	2			1			3
Canada		1	1	1	1		4
China	2	1	1	1	1	1	7
Colombia				1			1
Costa Rica			1				1
Cyprus				1			1
Czech Republic		1					1
Ecuador		1					1
Egypt		1	1	1			3
Estonia				1			1
Finland			1	1			2
France		1	~~1~~	1			2
Georgia				1			1
Germany		1	1	1			3
Great Britain	2	1	1		1	1	6
Greece			1	1		1	3
Guatemala			1				1
Hungary		1	1				2
Iceland		1					1
Iran		1					1
Ireland			1				1
Israel	2	1		1			4
Italy		1	1	1			3
Japan		1	1	1	1	1	5
Kazakhstan	2	1		1		1	5
Latvia		1					1
Lithuania			1				1
Malaysia			1	1			2
Mexico			1	1		1	3
Namibia						1	1
New Zealand		1					1
North Korea				1			1
Norway		1		1			2
Portugal	2		1		1		4
Puerto Rico	2	1	1				3
Romania		1	1	1			3
Russia	2	1	1	1		1	6
Serbia		1					1
Singapore			1				1
South Africa	2	1	1	1			5
South Korea		1	1	1			3
Spain			1	1	1	1	4
Sri Lanka			1				1
Sweden		1	1				2
Switzerland						1	1
Chinese Taipei		1					1
Tunisia				1			1
Turkey		1	1				2
Ukraine	2	1	1	1			5
United States		1		1		1	3
Uzbekistan	2	1	1	1	1		6
Venezuela		1					1
Vietnam		1	1				2
Total: 63 NOCs	24	36	35	36	12	12	155

=== Acrobatic ===
Each National Olympic Committee (NOC) can enter a maximum of 1 team of 2 athletes. As hosts, Argentina was given a team to compete, causing a reduction to the number of teams qualified from the Americas. The remaining 11 teams were to be decided at the 2018 Acrobatics World Championships. Host Argentina declined the quota while no nation from Oceania competed. The United States declined the quota, and thus the two places were reallocated to Asia and Europe.

To be eligible to participate at the Youth Olympics athletes must have been born between 1 January 2000 and 31 December 2003.

Event	Location	Date	Continent	Total Places	Qualified.
2018 Acrobatic Gymnastics World Championships	(Belgium) Antwerp	5–8 April 2018	Africa	1	South Africa
2018 Acrobatic Gymnastics World Championships	(Belgium) Antwerp	5–8 April 2018	Americas	1	Puerto Rico
2018 Acrobatic Gymnastics World Championships	(Belgium) Antwerp	5–8 April 2018	Asia	3	Kazakhstan; China; Uzbekistan
2018 Acrobatic Gymnastics World Championships	(Belgium) Antwerp	5–8 April 2018	Europe	7	Portugal; Bulgaria; Great Britain; Ukraine; Belarus; Russia; Israel
TOTAL					12

=== Artistic ===
Each National Olympic Committee (NOC) could enter a maximum of two athletes, one per each gender. As hosts, Argentina wase given the maximum quota should they not have qualified normally and two spots, one for each gender, were decided by the tripartite commission; however, only one was given. These quotas caused a reduction from the continental quota depending on which continent the chosen nation was from. The remaining quotas were determined through five continental qualifiers.

To be eligible to participate at the Youth Olympics male athletes must have been born between 1 January 2001 and 31 December 2002 while female athletes must have been born between 1 January 2003 and 31 December 2003. Also athletes who have participated in FIG senior competitions or multisport games may not participate in the Youth Olympic Games

Event	Location	Date	Total places	Qualified men	Qualified women
2018 Asian Junior Championships	(Indonesia) Jakarta	25–28 April 2018	8	China; Japan; Kazakhstan; Vietnam; Chinese Taipei; Iran; South Korea; Uzbekistan	China; South Korea; Japan; Uzbekistan; Vietnam; Singapore; Malaysia; Sri Lanka
2018 African Junior Championships	(Namibia) Swakopmund	9–12 May 2018	3	Egypt; South Africa	South Africa; Egypt; Algeria
2018 Oceania Junior Championships	(Australia) Melbourne	25 May 2018	1	New Zealand	Australia
2018 Pan-American Junior Championships	(Argentina) Buenos Aires	13–15 June 2018	7	United States; Brazil; Canada; Ecuador; Argentina; Puerto Rico; Venezuela	Canada; Argentina; Brazil; Mexico; Puerto Rico; Guatemala; Costa Rica
2018 European Junior Championships	(Azerbaijan) Baku	23 June 2018	17	Russia; Hungary; Great Britain; Italy; Azerbaijan; France; Latvia; Ukraine; Belgium; Germany; Norway; Turkey; Sweden; Serbia; Israel; Czech Republic; Romania	Ukraine; France; Russia; Italy; Great Britain; Hungary; Turkey; Sweden; Germany; Romania; Lithuania; Ireland; Spain; Finland; Portugal; Belarus; Greece
Tripartite Invitation	-	-	17	Iceland	
TOTAL				36	36

=== Rhythmic ===
Each National Olympic Committee (NOC) can enter a maximum of 1 athlete. As hosts, Argentina was given a spot to compete should they not qualify and one quota was to be given by the tripartite commission, however none was awarded. These quotas would have caused a reduction from the continental quota depending which continent the chosen nation is from. The remaining quotas were decided at five continental qualifiers.

To be eligible to participate at the Youth Olympics athletes must have been born between 1 January 2003 and 31 December 2003. Also athletes who have participated in FIG senior competitions or multisport games may not participate in the Youth Olympic Games

Event	Location	Date	Total Places	Qualified
European Qualification Event	(Russia) Moscow	15 February 2018	18	Russia; Ukraine; Belarus; Israel; Bulgaria; Italy; Armenia; Finland; Azerbaijan; France; Romania; Spain; Georgia; Cyprus; Germany; Norway; Greece; Estonia
2018 African Junior Championships	(Egypt) Cairo	26–28 April 2018	3	Egypt; South Africa; Tunisia
2018 Pan-American Junior Championships	(Colombia) Medellín	3–5 May 2018	7	United States; Canada; Brazil; Mexico; Argentina; Colombia; Bolivia
2018 Asian Junior Championships	(Malaysia) Kuala Lumpur	29 April–2 May 2018	7	Uzbekistan; Japan; Malaysia; Kazakhstan; China; North Korea; South Korea
2018 Oceania Junior Championships	(Australia) Melbourne	1–2 June 2018	1	Australia
TOTAL				36

=== Trampoline ===
Each National Olympic Committee (NOC) can enter a maximum of 2 athletes, 1 per each gender. As hosts, Argentina was given a spot to compete in either the Men’ or Women’ events and one quota will be given to either the Men’ or Women’ events by the Tripartite Commission. Argentina chose to compete in the Men's event while no tripartite quota was awarded. This caused a reduction from the continental quota depending which continent the chosen nation is from. The remaining quotas were decided through five continental qualifiers.

To be eligible to participate at the Youth Olympics athletes must have been born between 1 January 2001 and 31 December 2002. Also athletes who have participated in FIG senior competitions or multisport games may not participate in the Youth Olympic Games

Event	Location	Date	Total Places	Qualified Men	Qualified Women
2018 European Junior Championships	(Azerbaijan) Baku	12–15 April 2018	5	Belarus; Great Britain; Austria; Portugal; Spain	Russia; Great Britain; Spain; Switzerland; Greece
2018 African Junior Championships	(Egypt) Cairo	26–28 April 2018	1	Algeria	Namibia
2018 Asian Junior Championships	(Philippines) Makati	19-20 May 2018	3	China; Uzbekistan; Japan	China; Japan; Kazakhstan
2018 Oceania Junior Championships	(Australia) Melbourne	31 May–3 June 2018	1	Australia	Australia
2018 Pan American Junior Championships	(Bolivia) Cochabamba	19–23 June 2018	2	Canada	United States; Mexico
Host	-	-	2	Argentina	
TOTAL				12	12

== Medal summary ==
=== Medalists ===
==== Acrobatic gymnastics ====
Games	Gold	Silver	Bronze
Mixed pairs	Mariela Kostadinova; Panayot Dimitrov; Bulgaria	Noa Yakar; Yonatan Fridman; Israel	Daryna Plokhotniuk; Oleksandr Madei; Ukraine

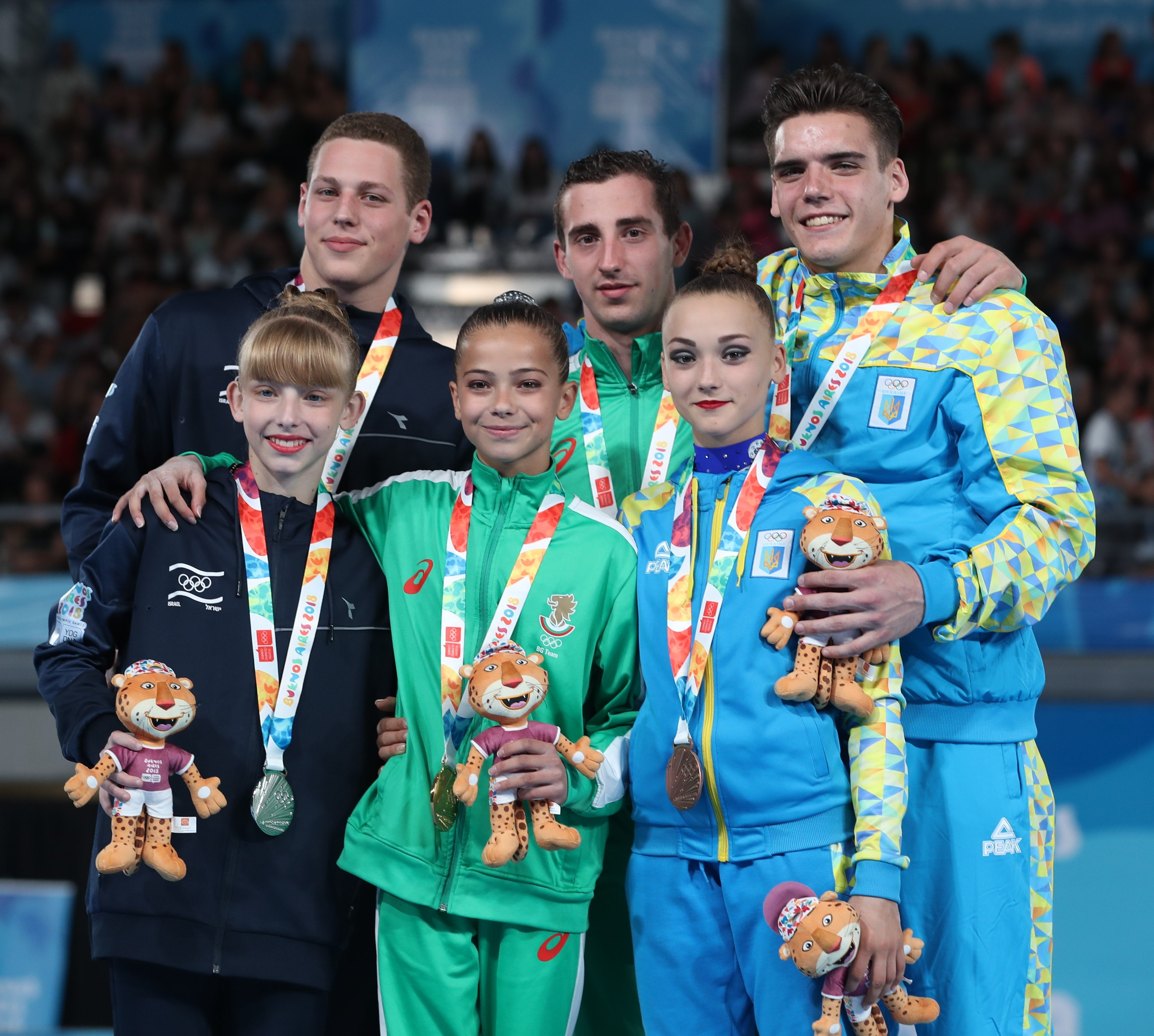
Victory ceremony (from left to right): Noa Yakar and Yonatan Fridman (Silver), Mariela Kostadinova and Panayot Dimitrov (Gold), Daryna Plokhotniuk and Oleksandr Madei (Bronze)

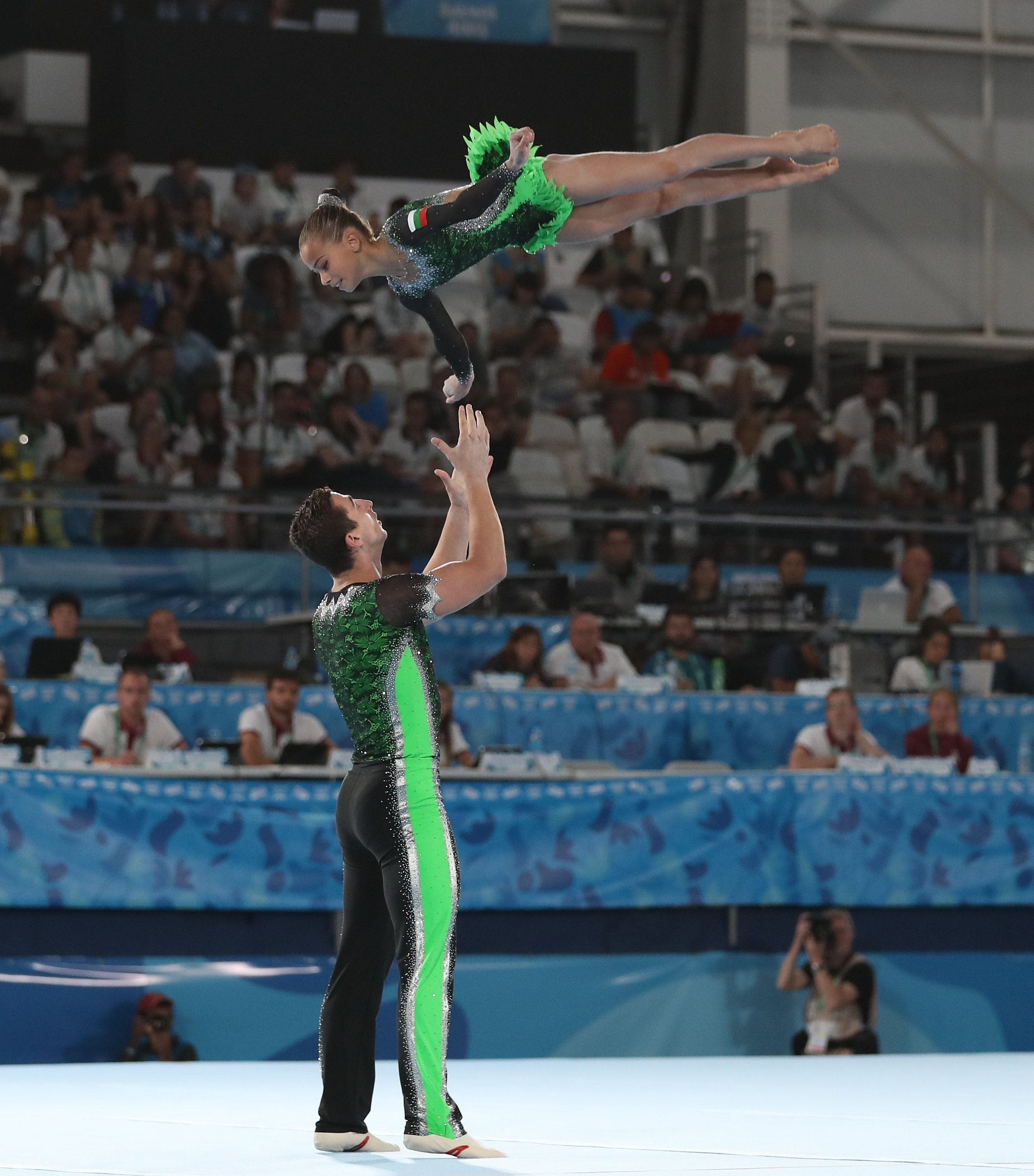
Bulgaria: Mariela Kostadinova and Panayot Dimitrov

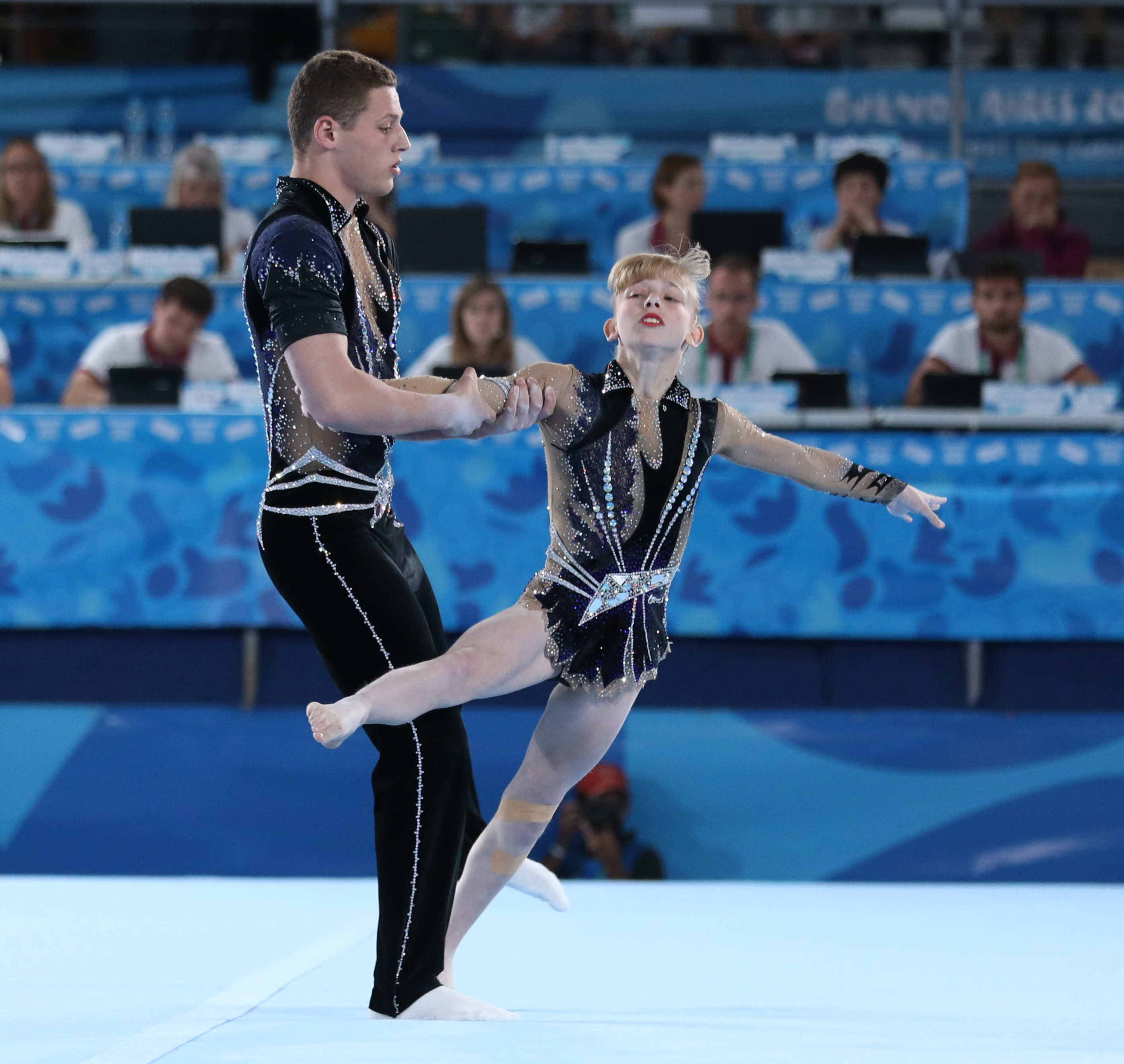
Israel: Noa Yakar and Yonatan Fridman

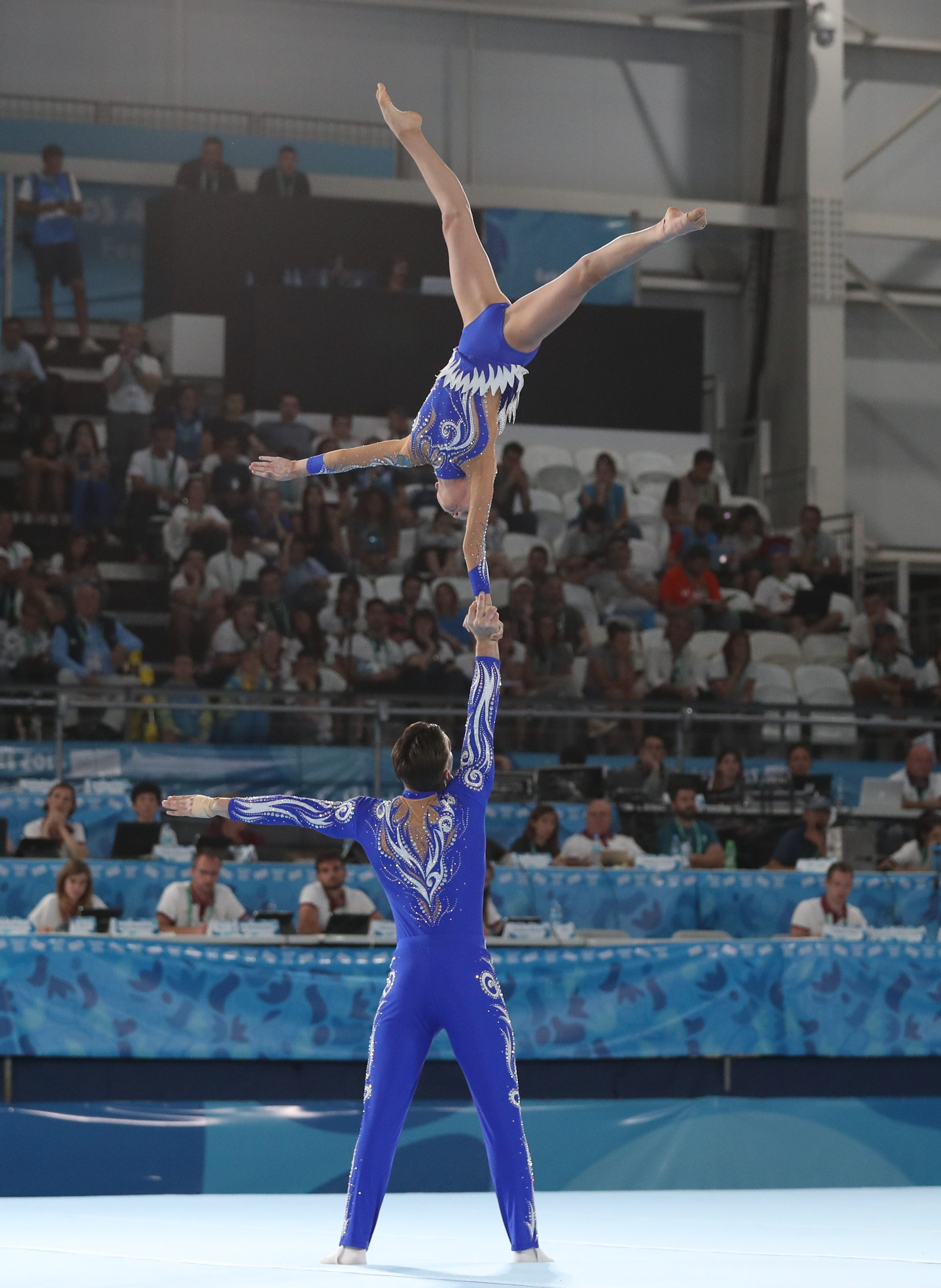
Ukraine: Daryna Plokhotniuk and Oleksandr Madei

==== Artistic gymnastics ====
===== Boys' events =====
Games	Gold	Silver	Bronze
All-around	Takeru Kitazono; Japan	Sergei Naidin; Russia	Diogo Soares; Brazil
Floor exercise	Takeru Kitazono; Japan	Krisztián Balázs; Hungary	Sergei Naidin; Russia
Pommel horse	Yin Dehang; China	Sergei Naidin; Russia	Reza Bohloulzadeh; Iran
Still rings	Takeru Kitazono; Japan	Félix Dolci; Canada	Yin Dehang; China
Vault	Brandon Briones; United States	Nazar Chepurnyi; Ukraine	Jacob Karlsen; Norway
Parallel bars	Takeru Kitazono; Japan	Yin Dehang; China	Sergei Naidin; Russia
Horizontal bar	Takeru Kitazono; Japan	Diogo Soares; Brazil	Krisztián Balázs; Hungary

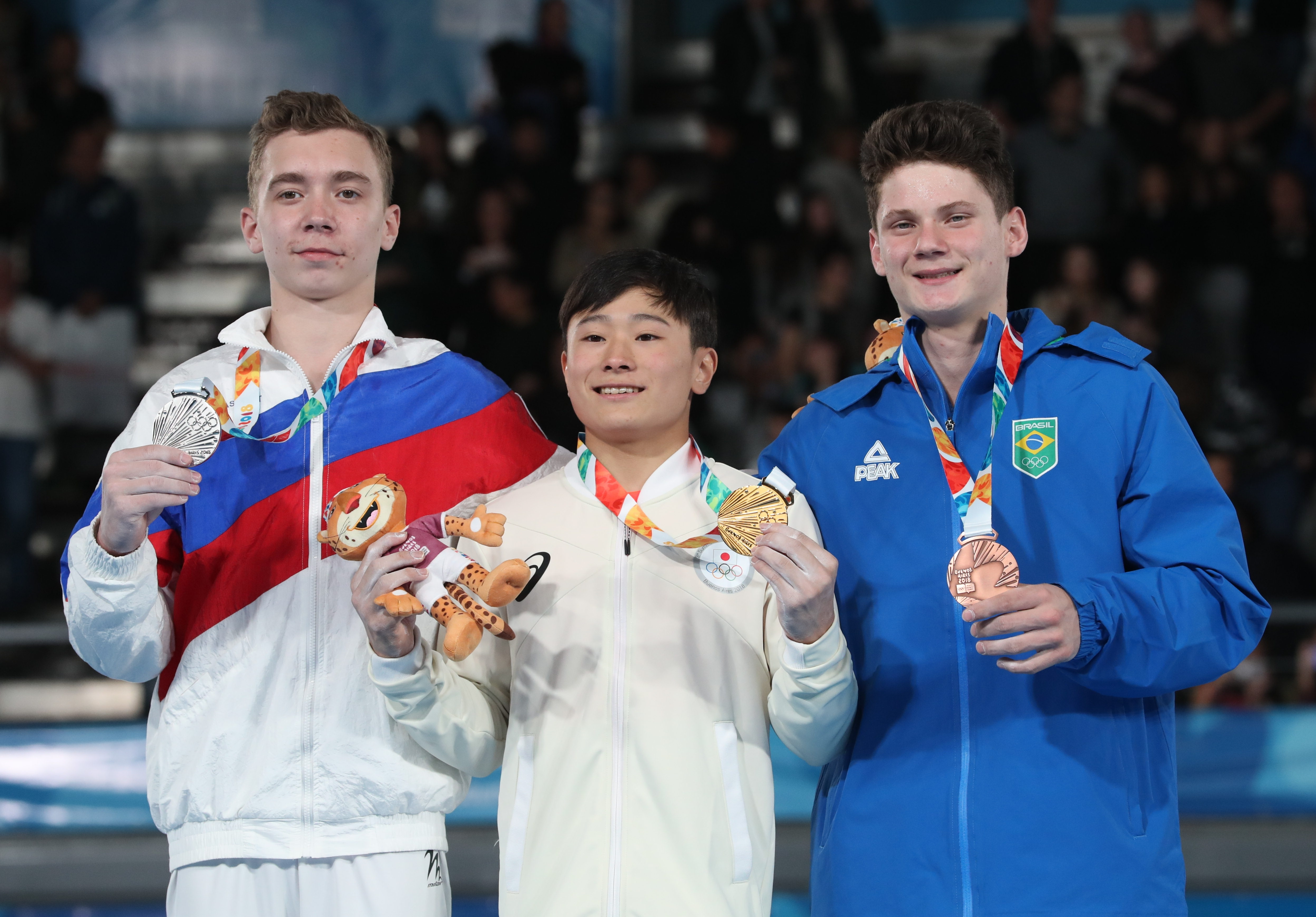
All-around victory ceremony (from left to right): Sergei Naidin (Silver), Takeru Kitazono (Gold), Diogo Soares (Bronze)

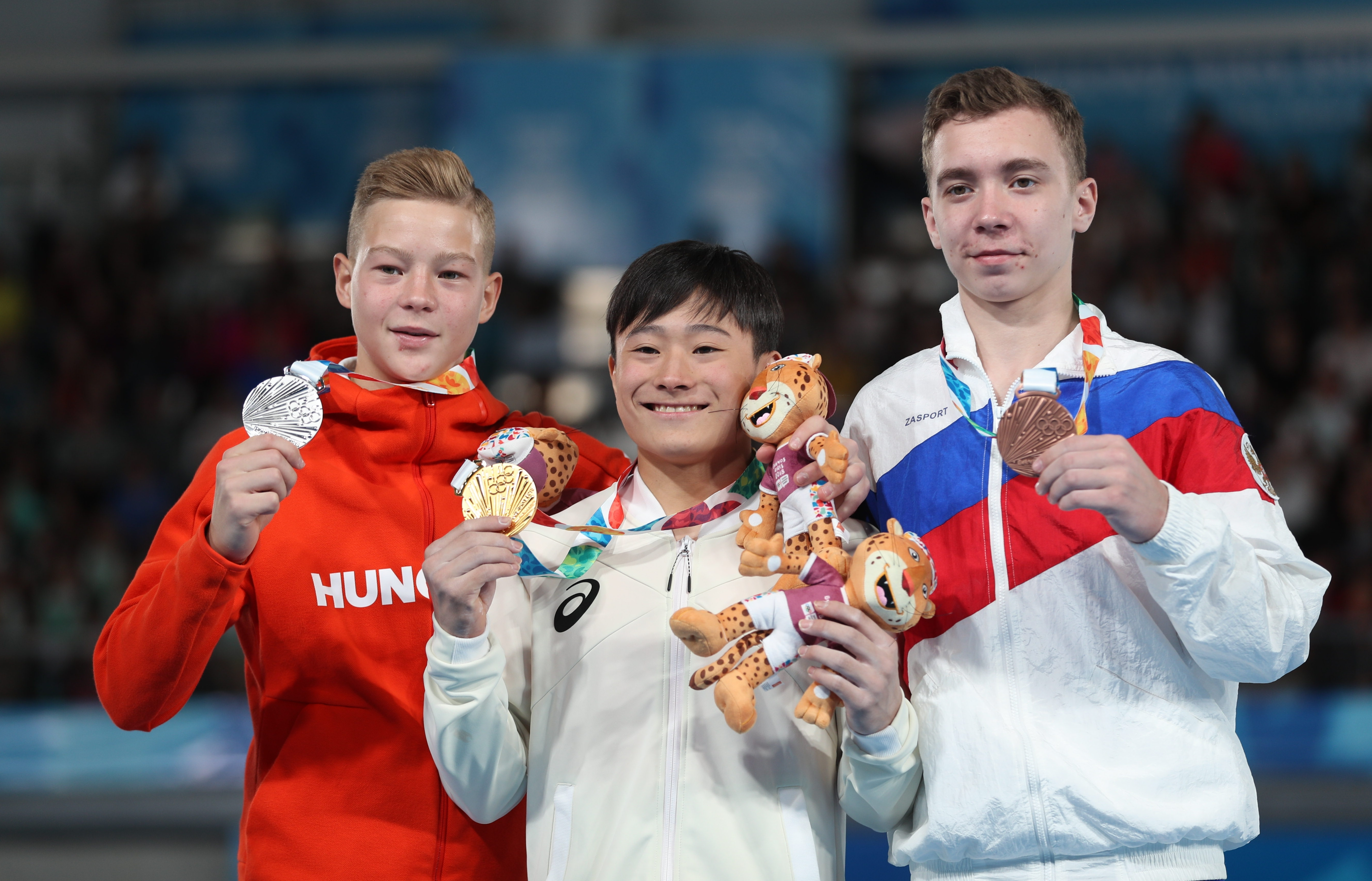
Floor exercise victory ceremony (from left to right): Krisztián Balázs (Silver), Takeru Kitazono (Gold), Sergei Naidin (Bronze)

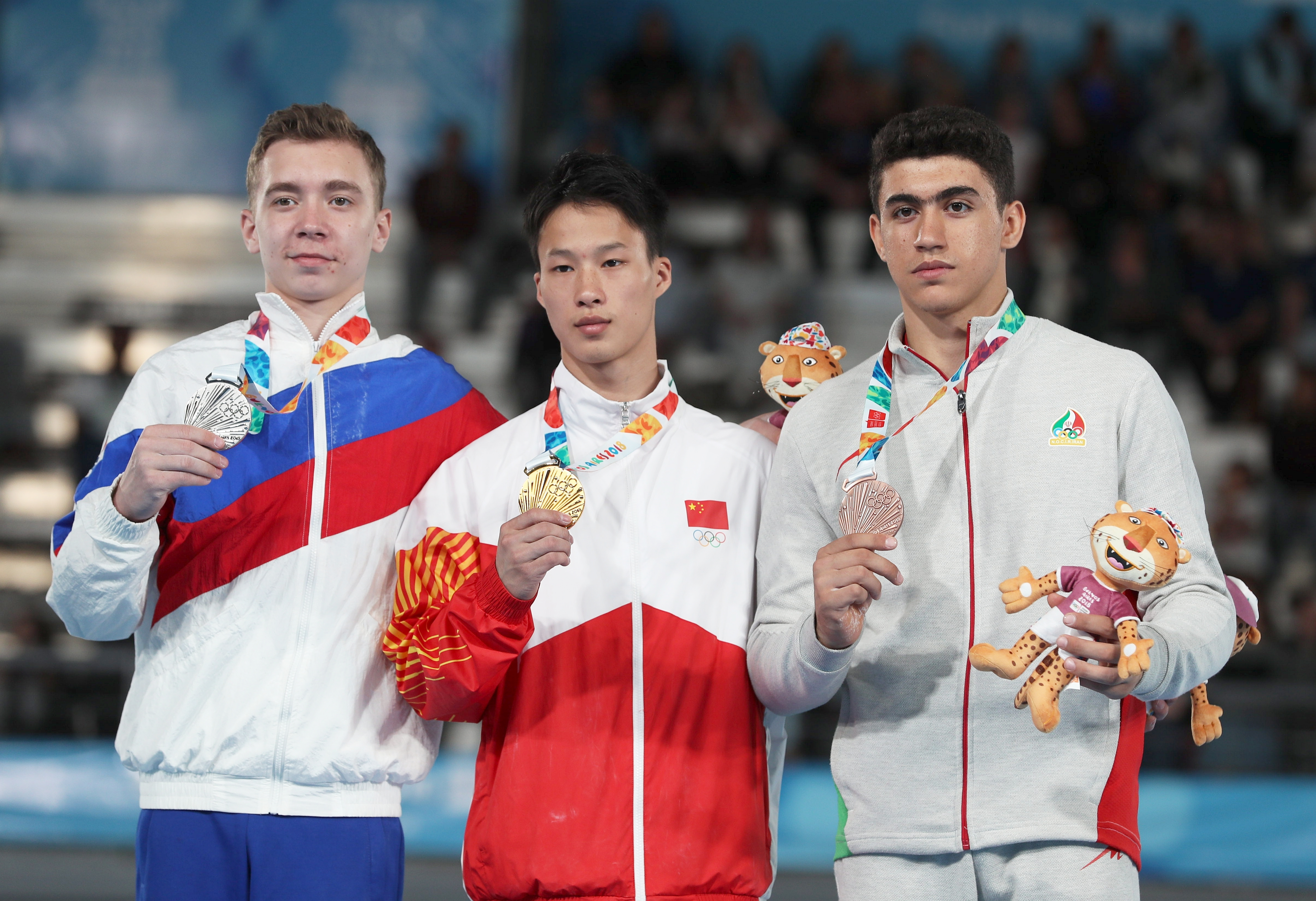
Pommel horse victory ceremony (from left to right): Sergei Naidin (Silver), Yin Dehang (Gold), Reza Bohloulzadeh (Bronze)

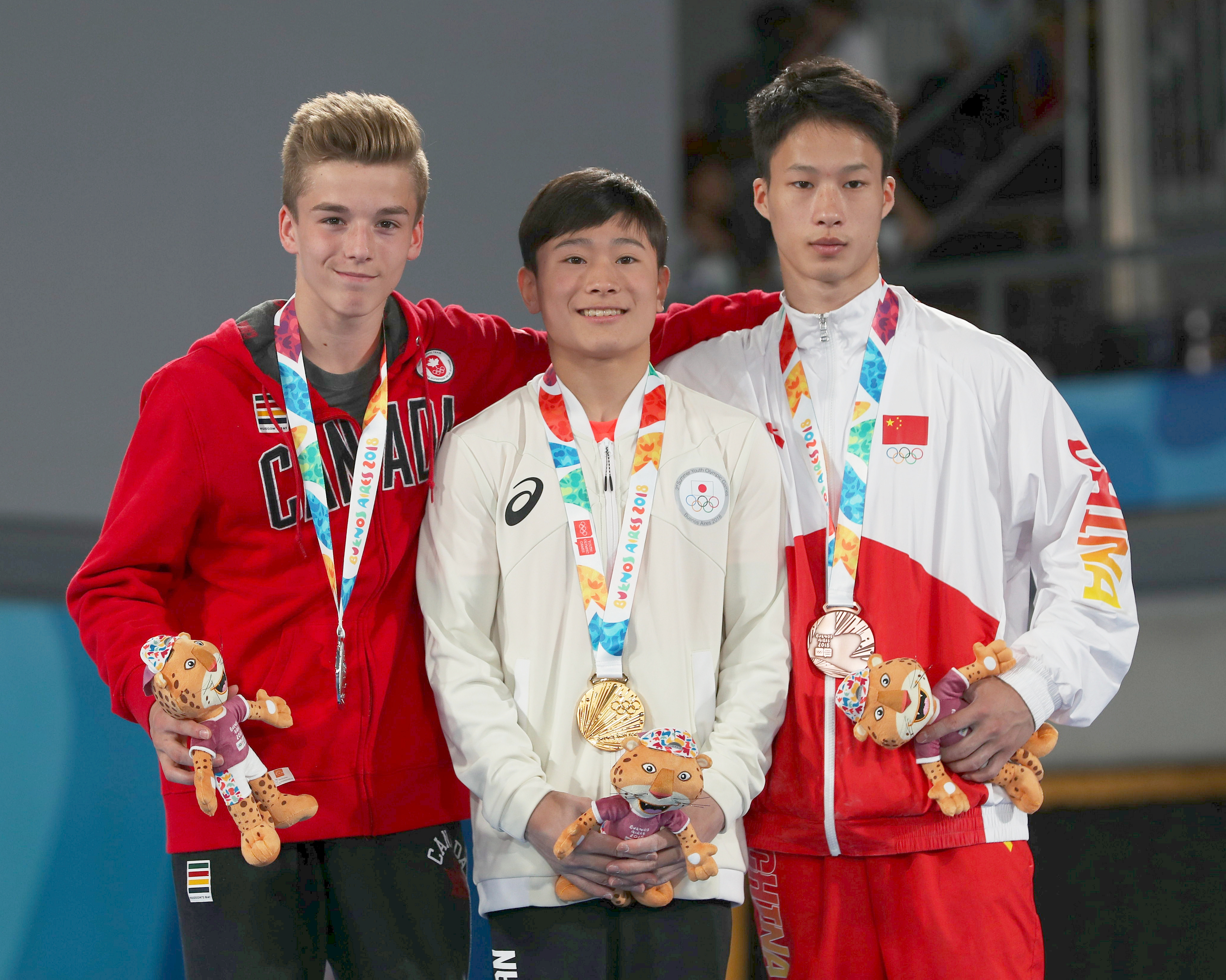
Still rings victory ceremony (from left to right): Félix Dolci (Silver), Takeru Kitazono (Gold), Yin Dehang (Bronze)

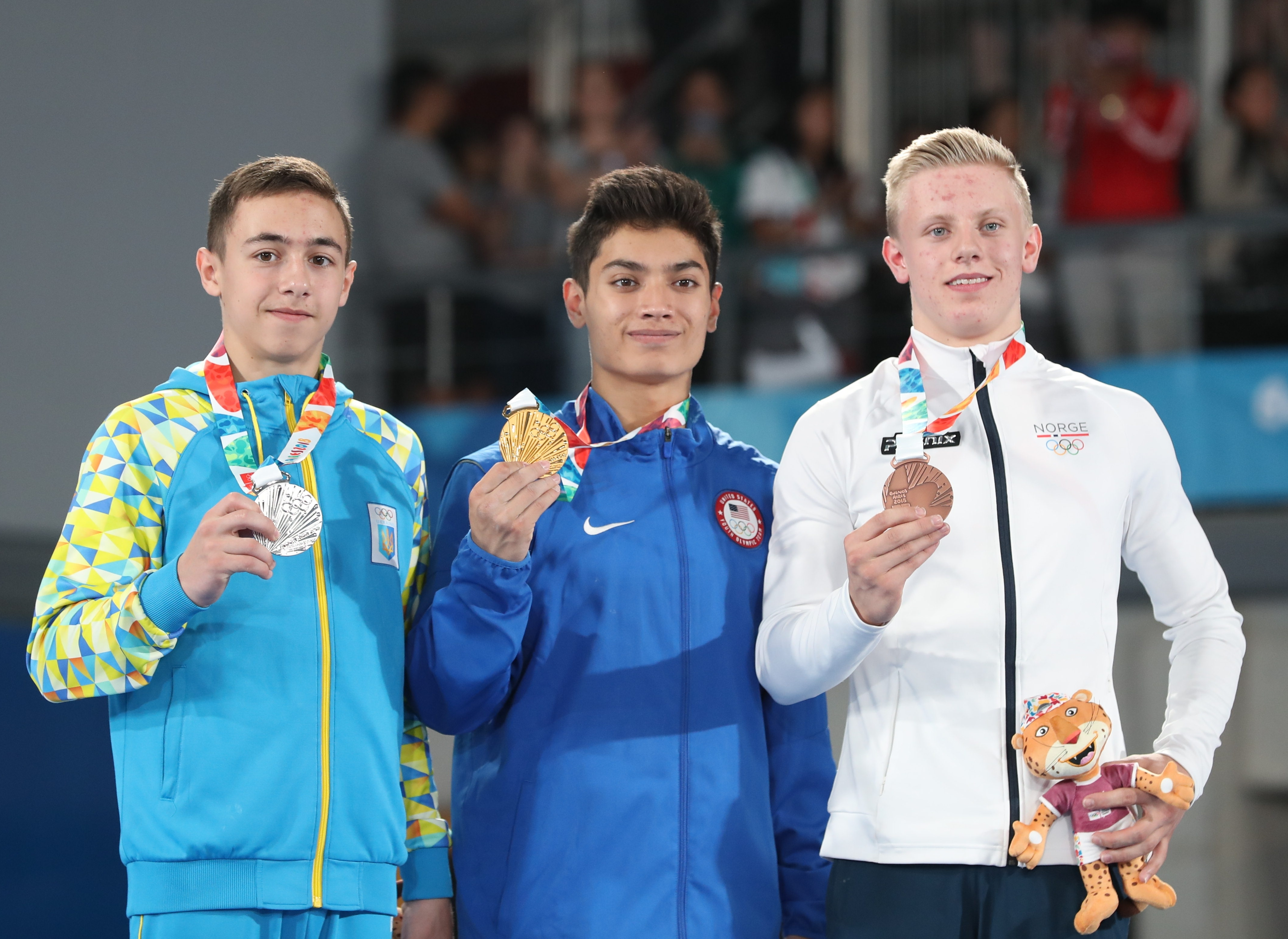
Vault victory ceremony (from left to right): Nazar Chepurnyi (Silver), Brandon Briones (Gold), Jacob Karlsen (Bronze)

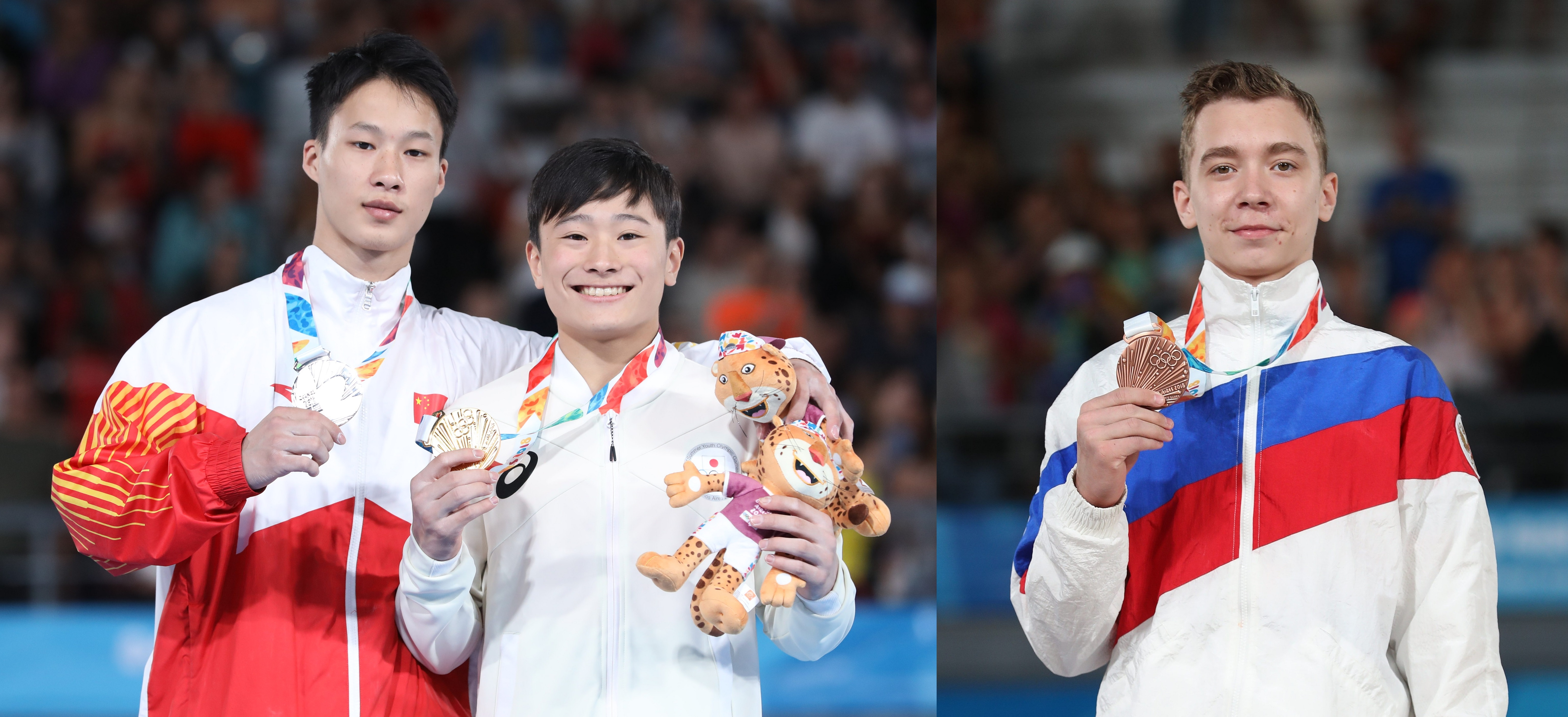
Parallel bars victory ceremony (from left to right): Yin Dehang (Silver), Takeru Kitazono (Gold), Sergei Naydin (Bronze; absent during the official ceremony due to an injury)

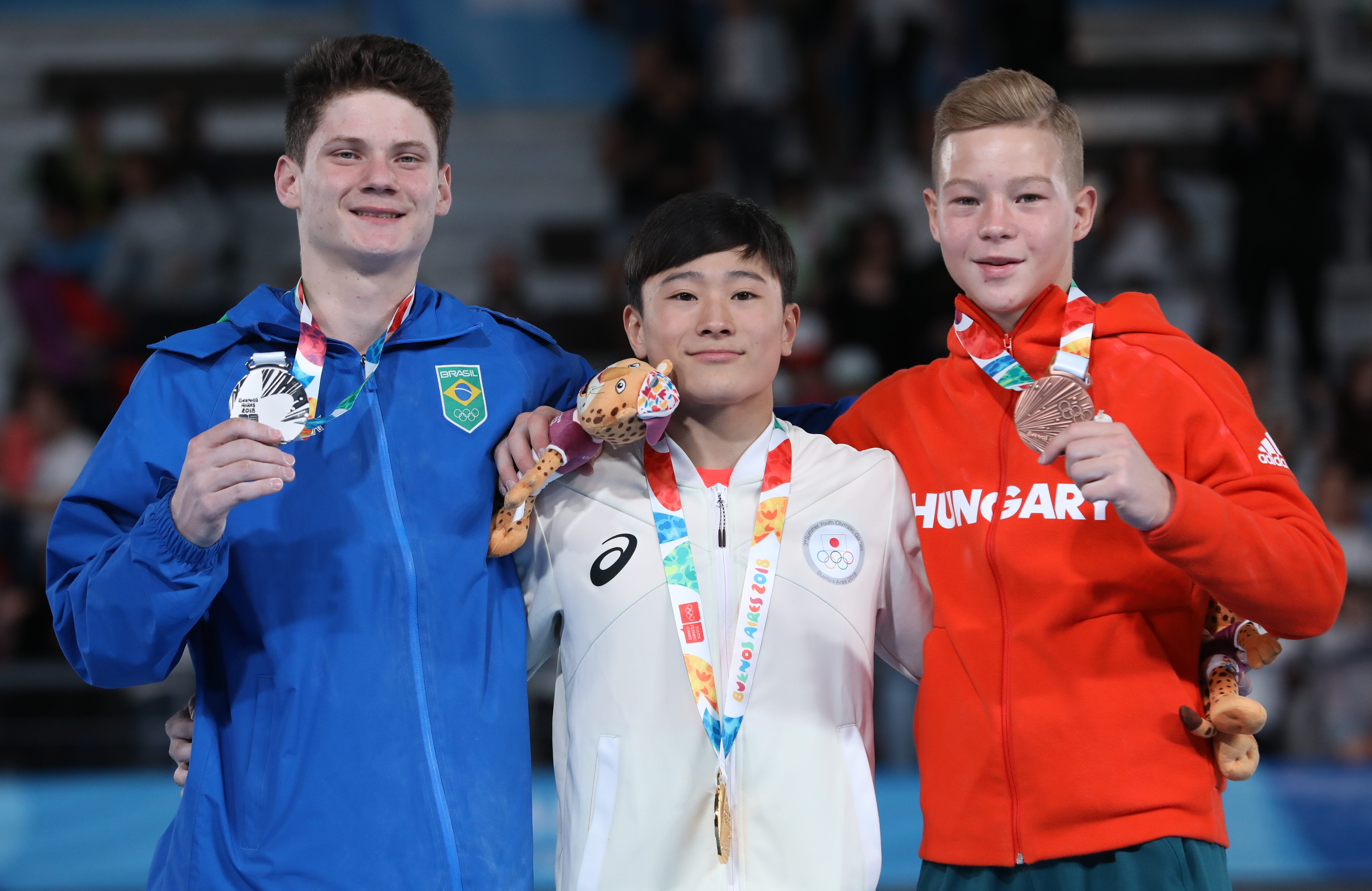
Horizontal bar victory ceremony (from left to right): Diogo Soares (Silver), Takeru Kitazono (Gold), Krisztián Balázs (Bronze)

===== Girls' events =====
Games	Gold	Silver	Bronze
All-around	Giorgia Villa; Italy	Amelie Morgan; Great Britain	Anastasiia Bachynska; Ukraine
Vault	Giorgia Villa; Italy	Csenge Bácskay; Hungary	Emma Spence; Canada
Uneven bars	Ksenia Klimenko; Russia	Giorgia Villa; Italy	Tang Xijing; China
Balance beam	Tang Xijing; China	Ksenia Klimenko; Russia	Amelie Morgan; Great Britain
Floor exercise	Giorgia Villa; Italy	Amelie Morgan; Great Britain	Anastasiia Bachynska; Ukraine

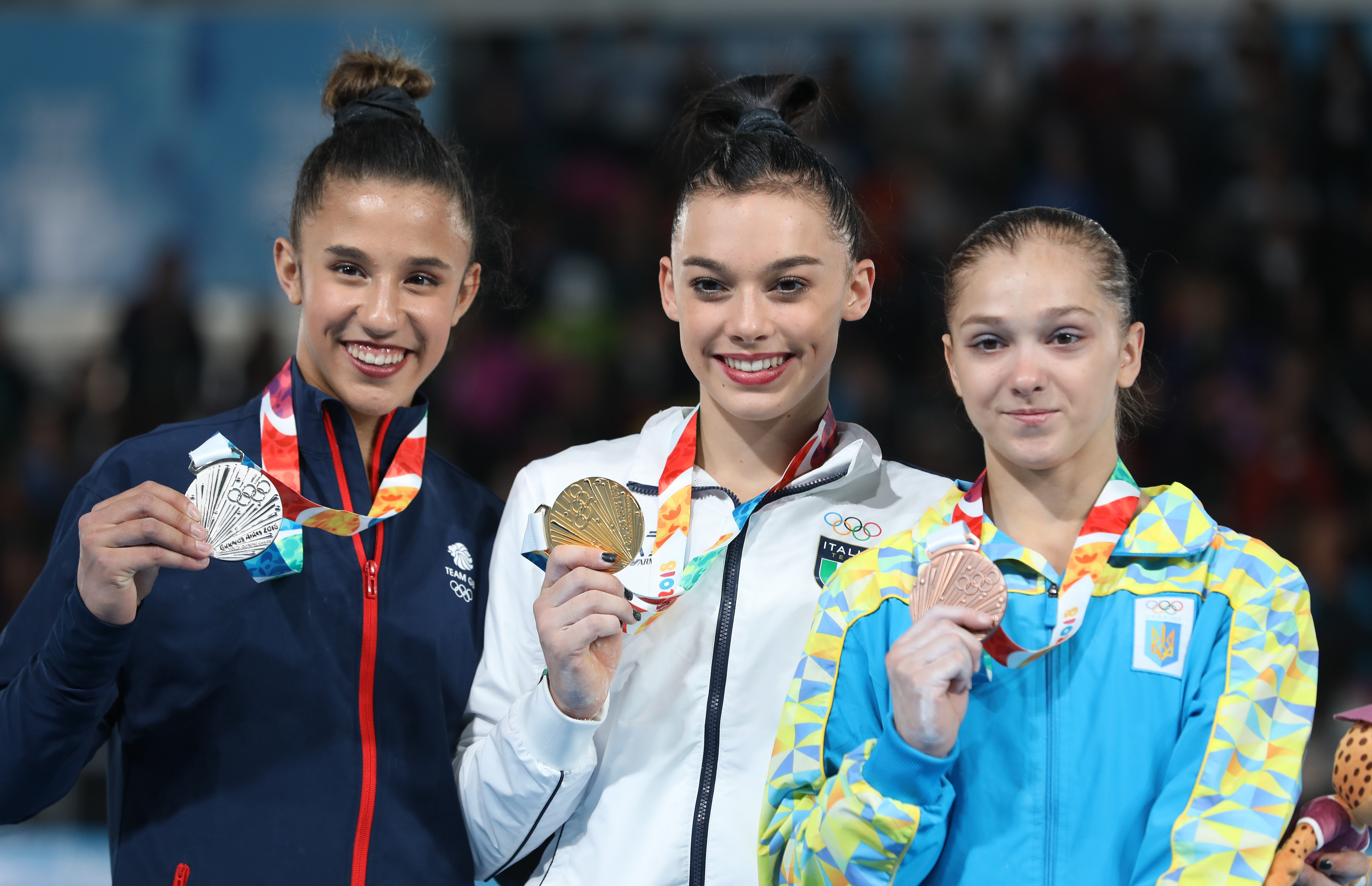
All-around victory ceremony (from left to right): Amelie Morgan (Silver), Giorgia Villa (Gold), Anastasiia Bachynska (Bronze)

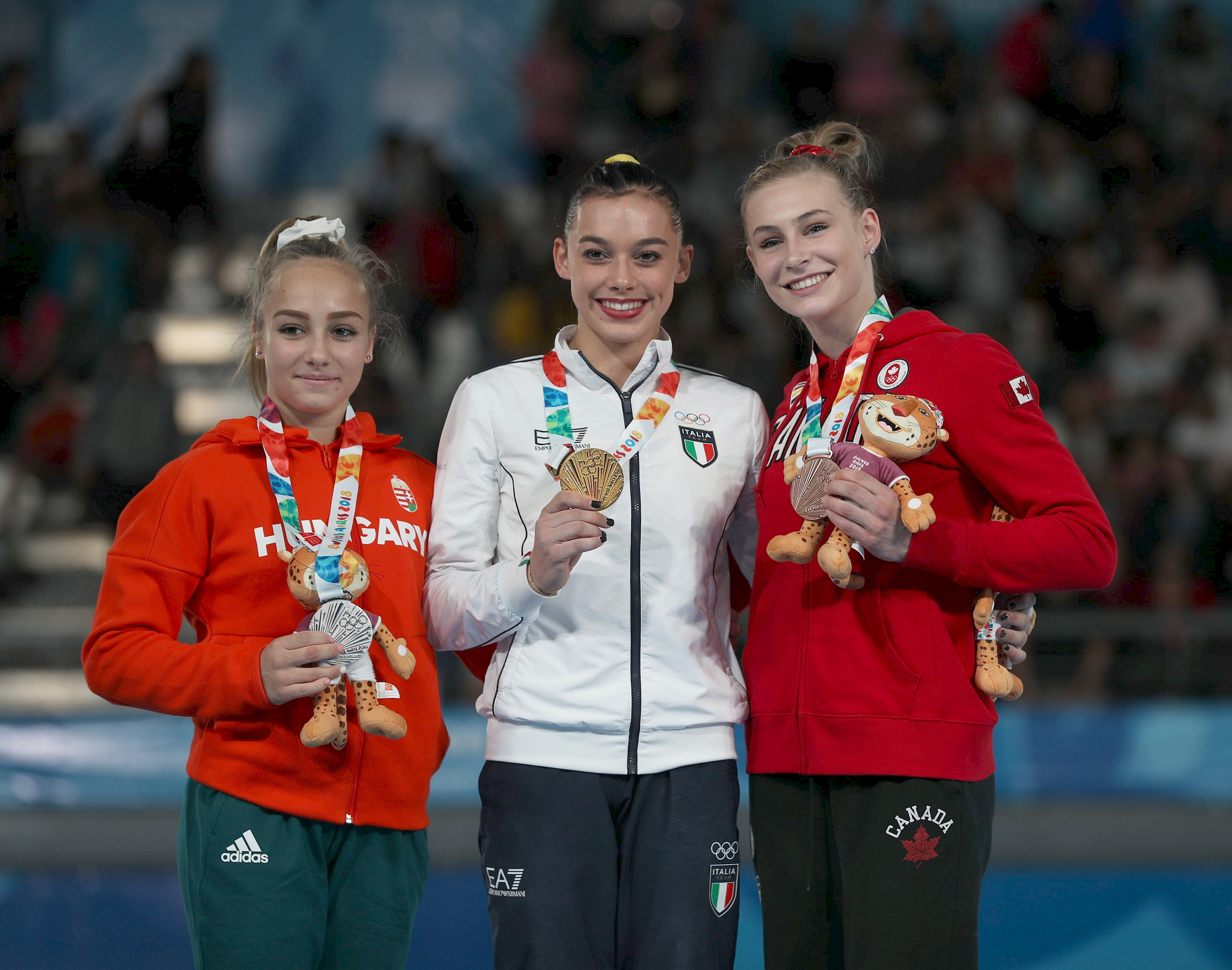
Vault victory ceremony (from left to right): Csenge Bácskay (Silver), Giorgia Villa (Gold), Emma Spence (Bronze)

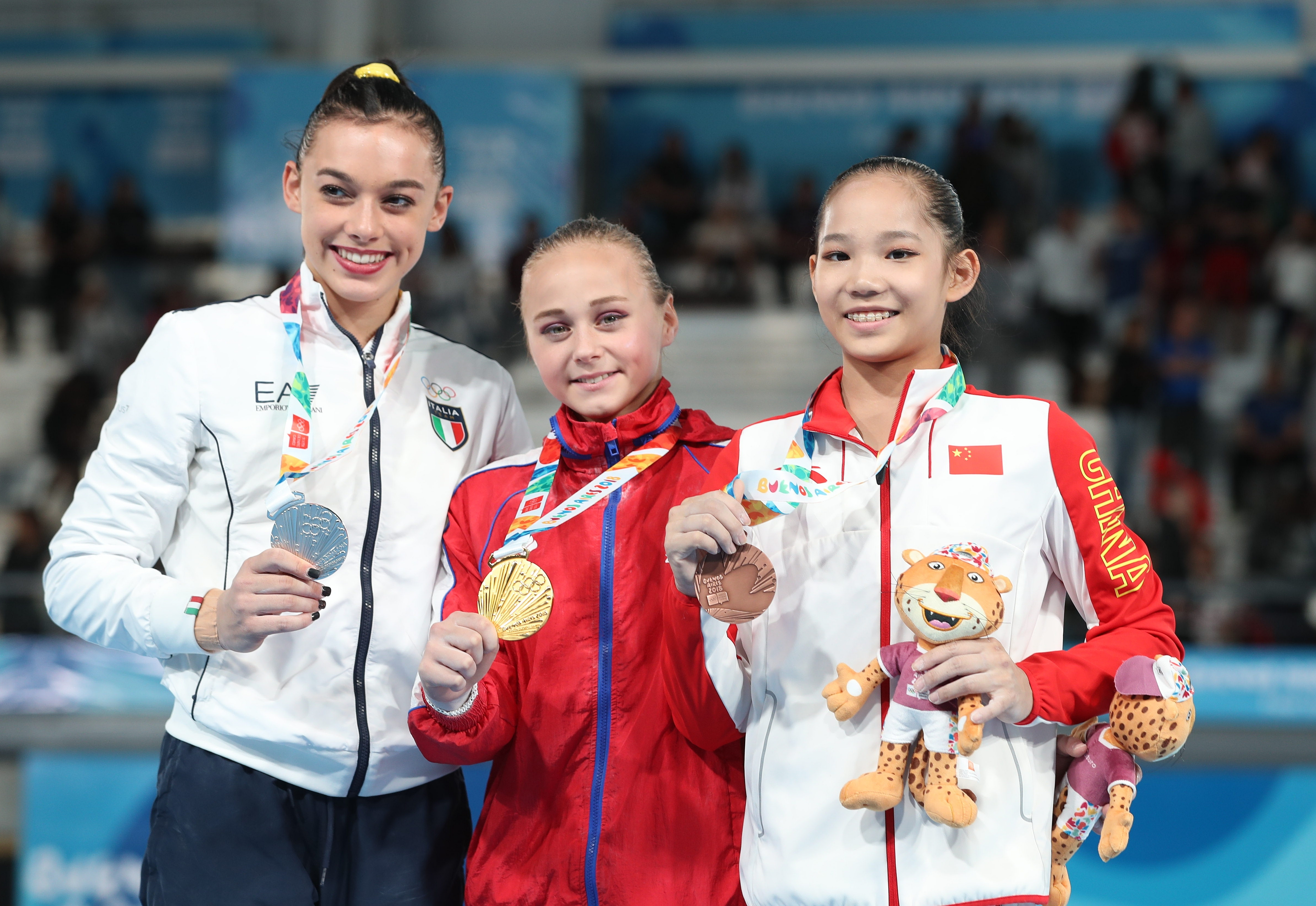
Uneven bars victory ceremony (from left to right): Giorgia Villa (Silver), Ksenia Klimenko (Gold), Tang Xijing (Bronze)

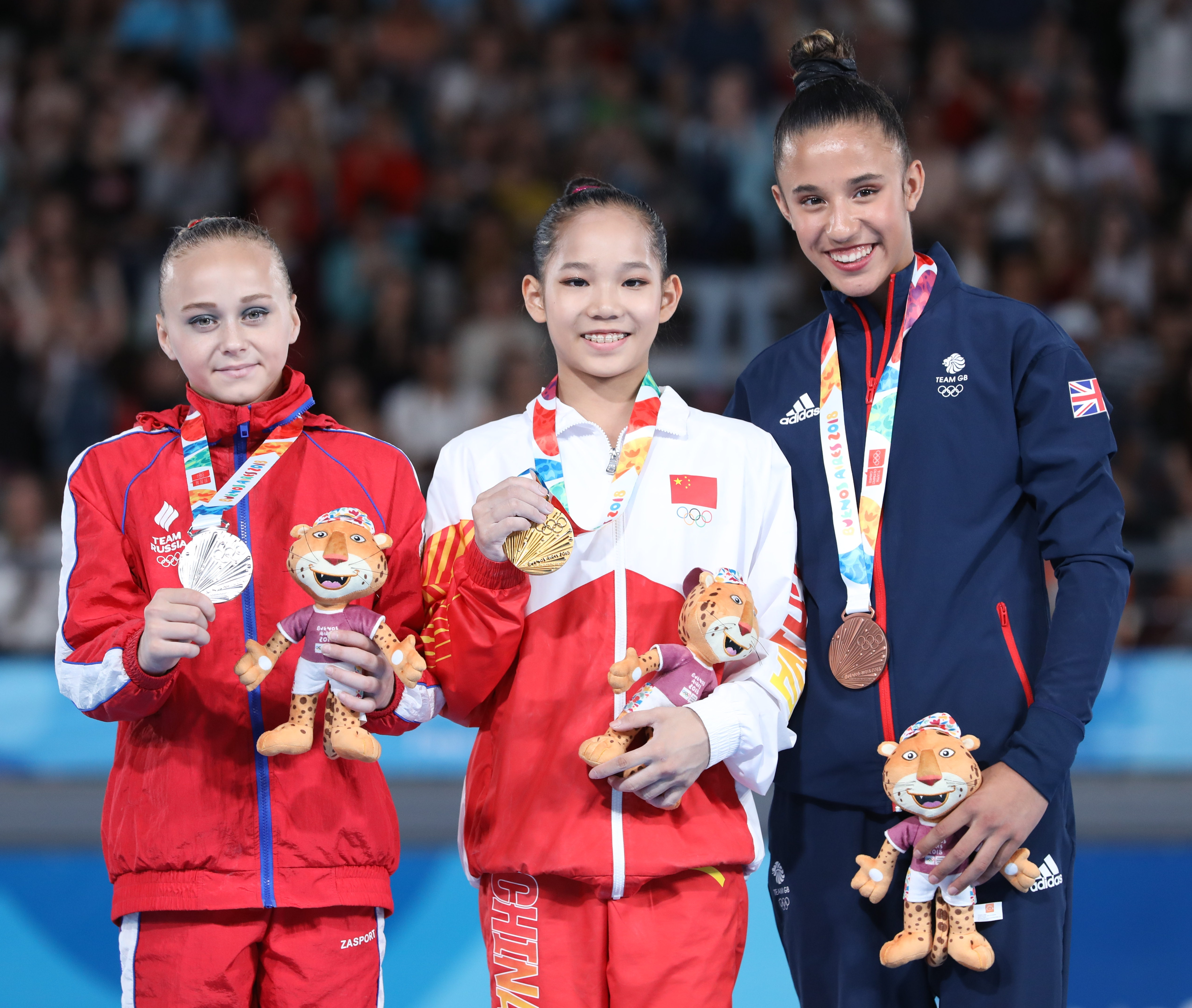
Balance beam victory ceremony (from left to right): Ksenia Klimenko (Silver), Tang Xijing (Gold), Amelie Morgan (Bronze)

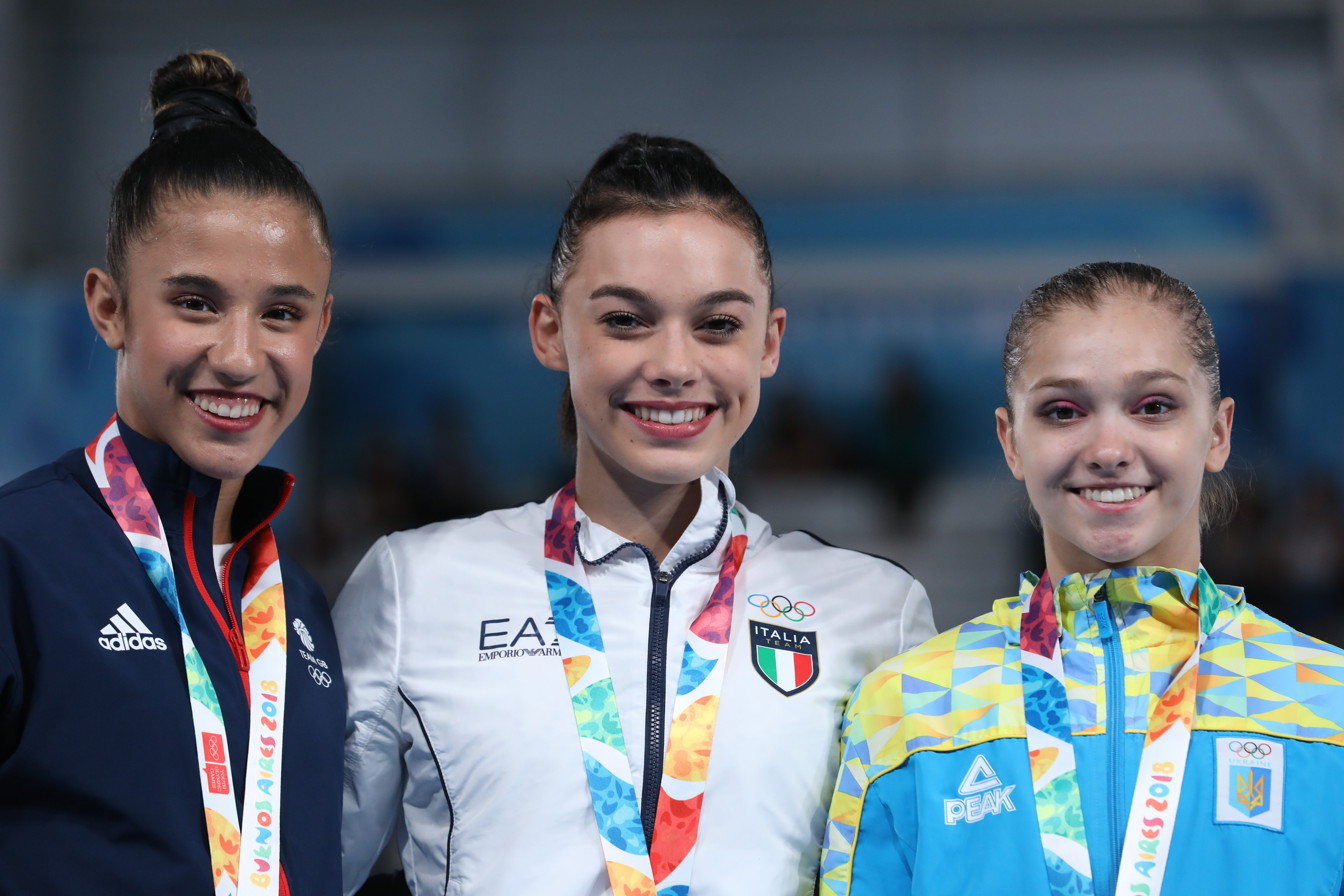
Floor exercise victory ceremony (from left to right): Amelie Morgan (Silver), Giorgia Villa (Gold), Anastasiia Bachynska (Bronze)

==== Mixed team ====
Games	Gold	Silver	Bronze
Mixed multi-discipline team	Team Simone Biles; Mariela Kostadinova (BUL); Panayot Dimitrov (BUL); Ruan Lange (RSA); Krisztián Balázs (HUN); Nazar Chepurnyi (UKR); Tamara Anika Ong (SGP); Phạm Như Phương (VIE); Alba Petisco (ESP); Talisa Torretti (ITA); Daria Trubnikova (RUS); Yelyzaveta Luzan (AZE); Liam Christie (AUS); Fan Xinyi (CHN)	Team Max Whitlock; Madalena Cavilhas (POR); Manuel Candeias (POR); Fernando Espíndola (ARG); Takeru Kitazono (JPN); Pablo Calvache (ECU); Camila Montoya (CRC); Kseniia Klimenko (RUS); Zeina Ibrahim (EGY); Rayna Khai Ling Hoh (MAS); Roza Abitova (KAZ); Adelina Beljajeva (EST); Robert Vilarasau (ESP); Jessica Clarke (GBR)	Team Oksana Chusovitina; Viktoryia Akhotnikava (BLR); Ilya Famenkou (BLR); Brandon Briones (USA); Adam Tobin (GBR); Mohamed Afify (EGY); Indira Ulmasova (UZB); Karla Pérez (GUA); Tonya Paulsson (SWE); Lidiia Iakovleva (AUS); Aino Yamada (JPN); Lilly Rotärmel (GER); Santiago Escallier (ARG); Antonia Sakellaridou (GRE)

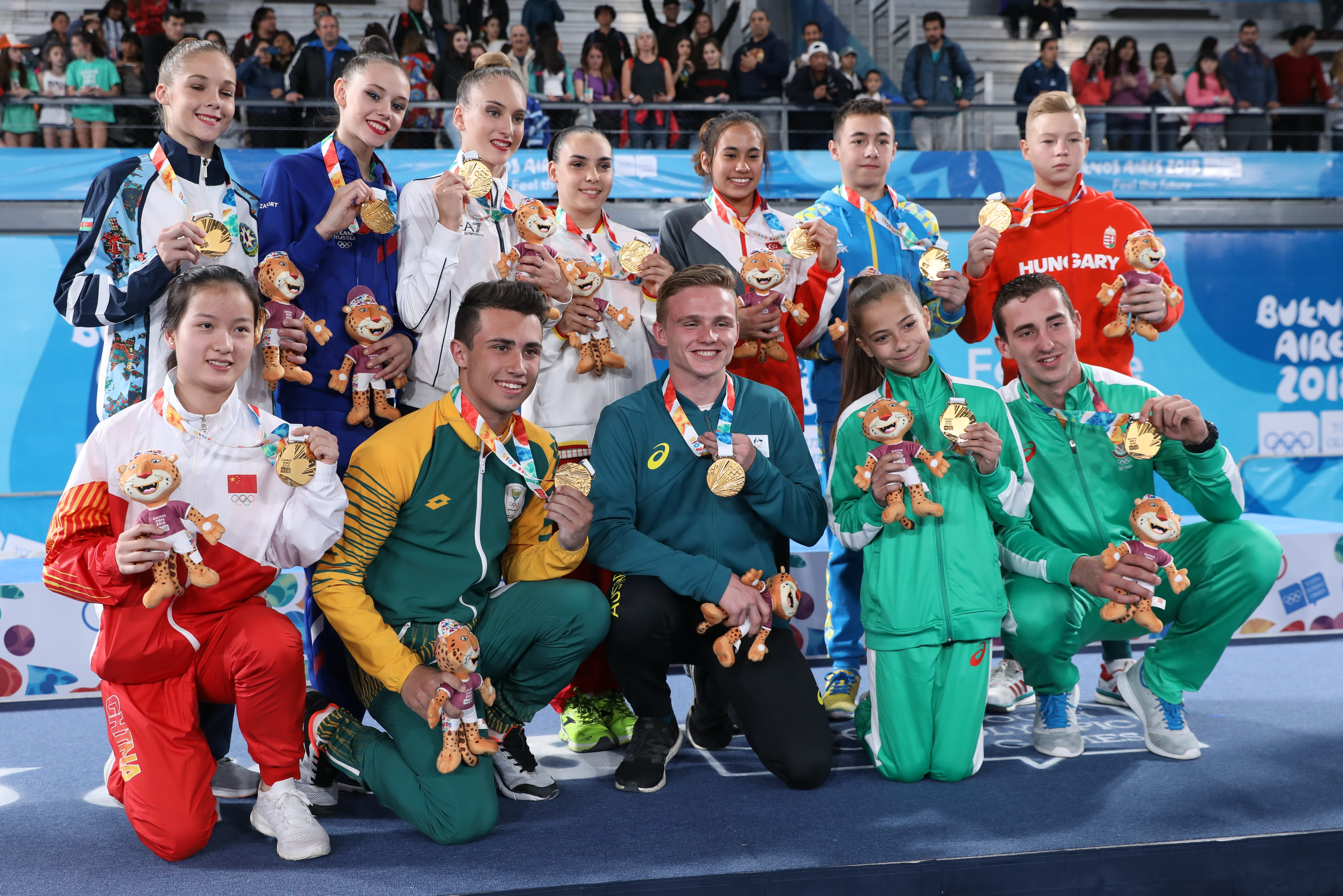
Team Simone Biles, gold medal

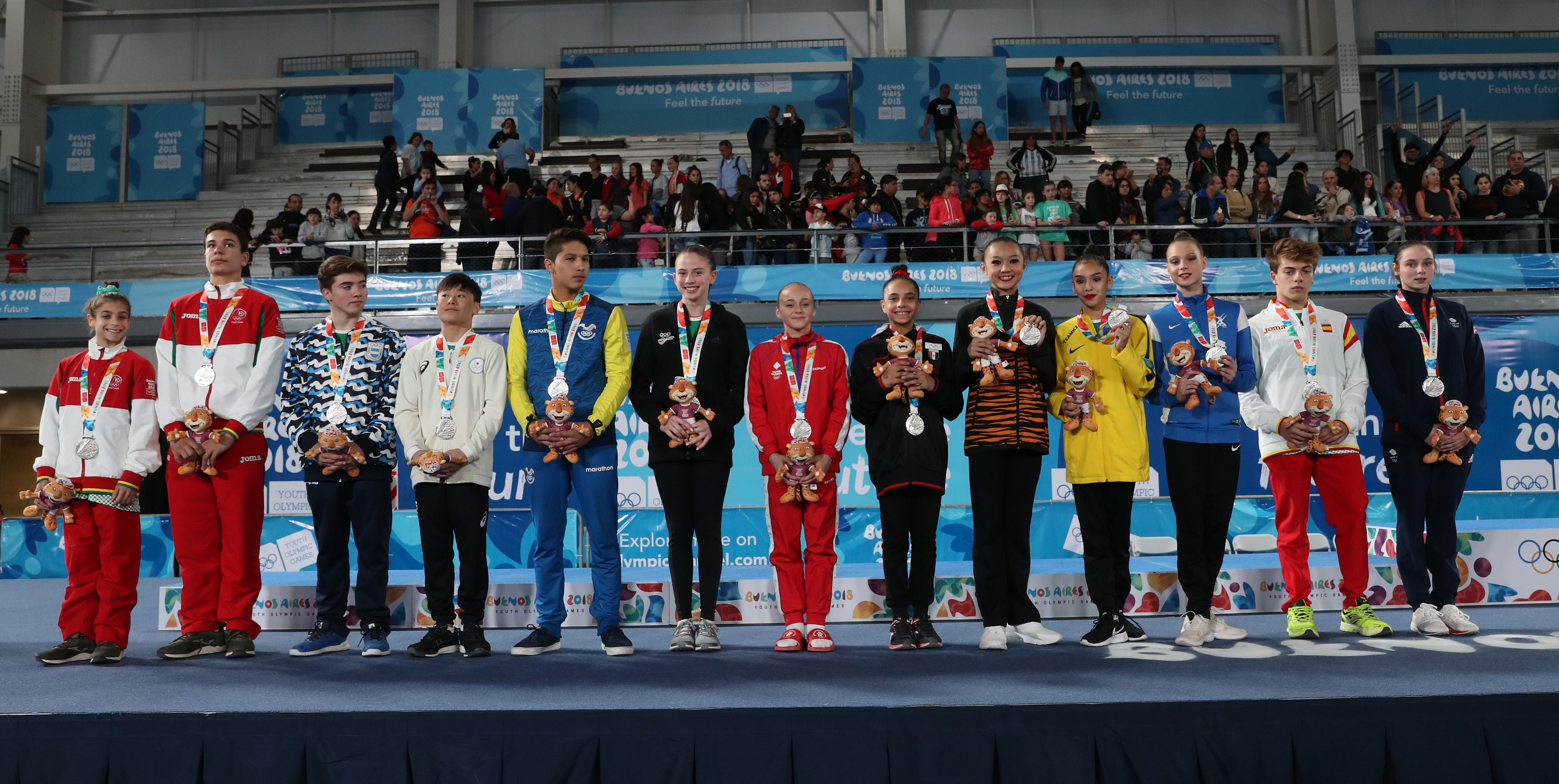
Team Max Whitlock, silver medal

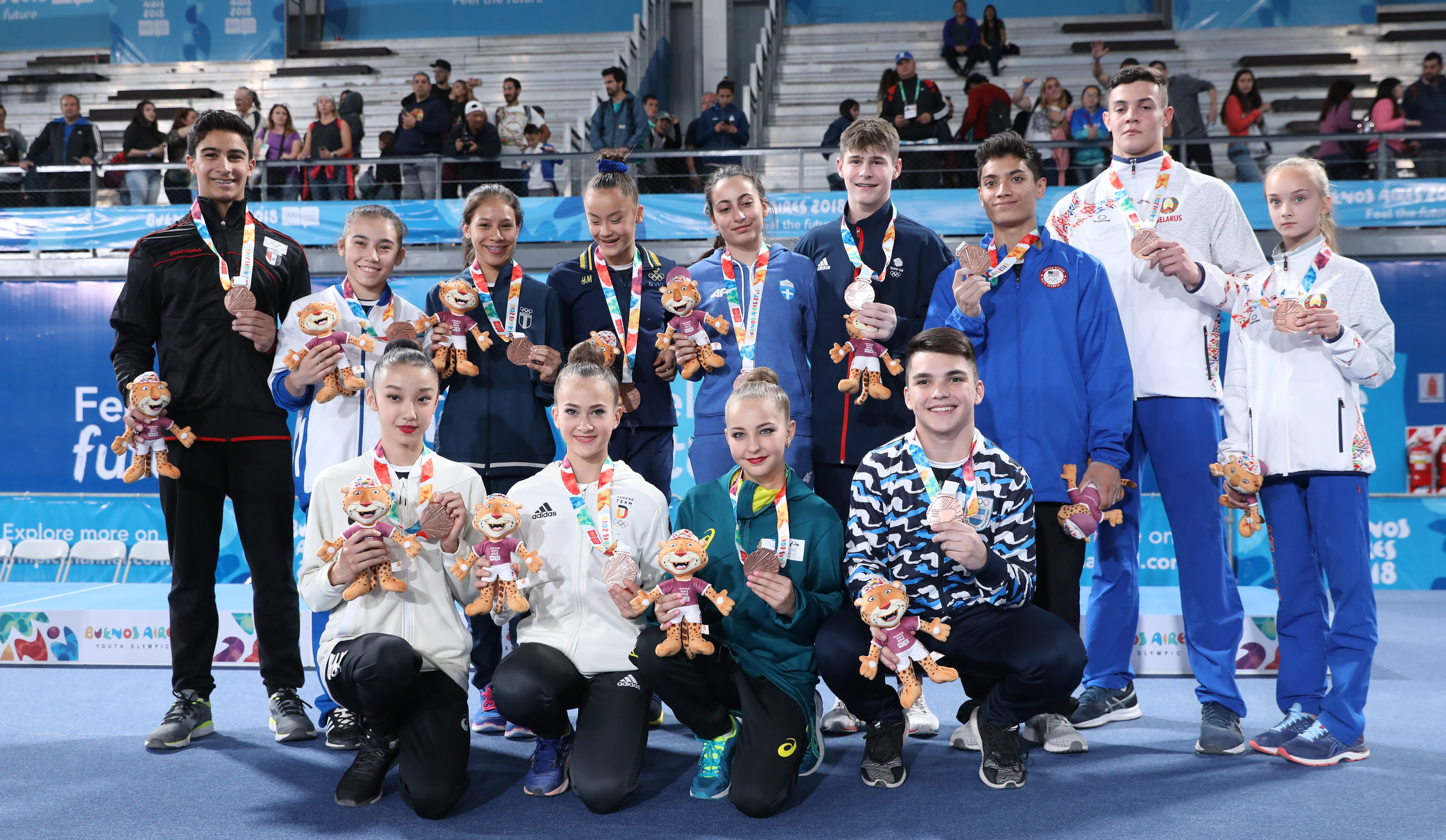
Team Oksana Chusovitina, bronze medal

==== Rhythmic gymnastics ====
Games	Gold	Silver	Bronze
Individual all-around	Daria Trubnikova; Russia	Khrystyna Pohranychna; Ukraine	Talisa Torretti; Italy

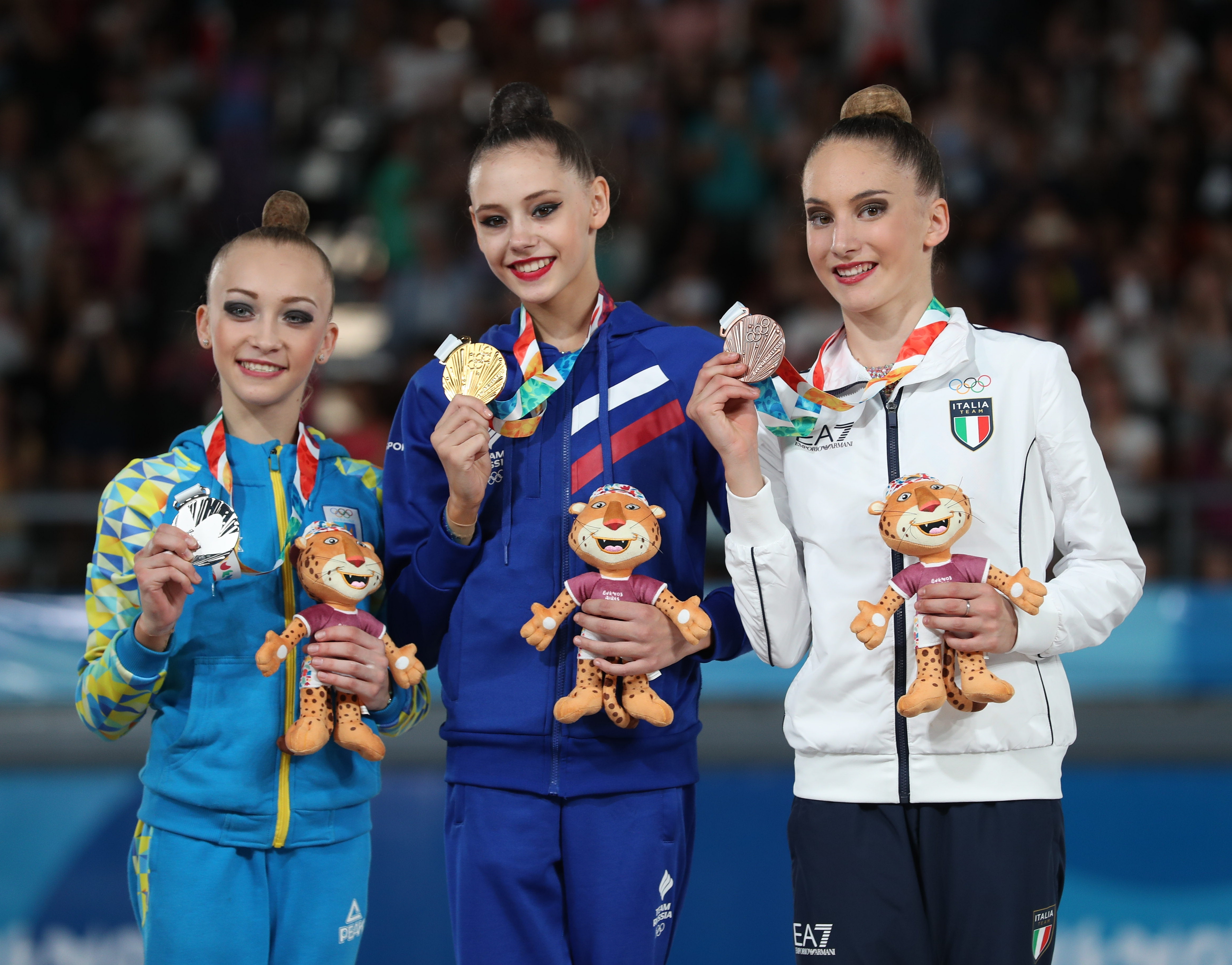
Victory ceremony (from left to right): Khrystyna Pohranychna (Silver), Daria Trubnikova (Gold), Talisa Torretti (Bronze)

==== Trampoline gymnastics ====
Games	Gold	Silver	Bronze
Boys' individual	Fu Fantao; China	Andrew Stamp; Great Britain	Benny Wizani; Austria
Girls' individual	Fan Xinyi; China	Jessica Pickering; Australia	Vera Beliankina; Russia

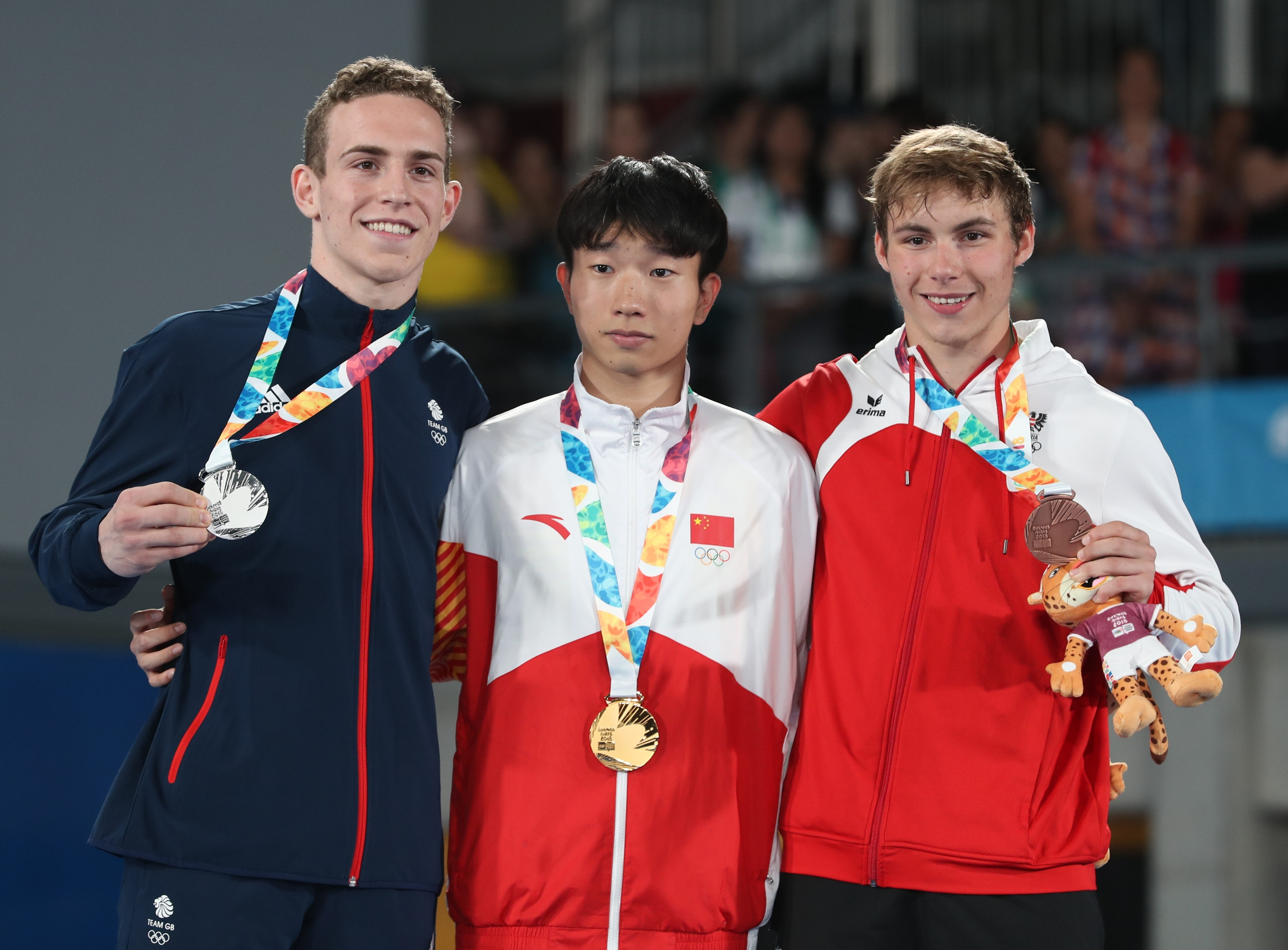
Boys victory ceremony (from left to right): Andrew Stamp (Silver), Fu Fantao (Gold), Benny Wizani (Bronze)

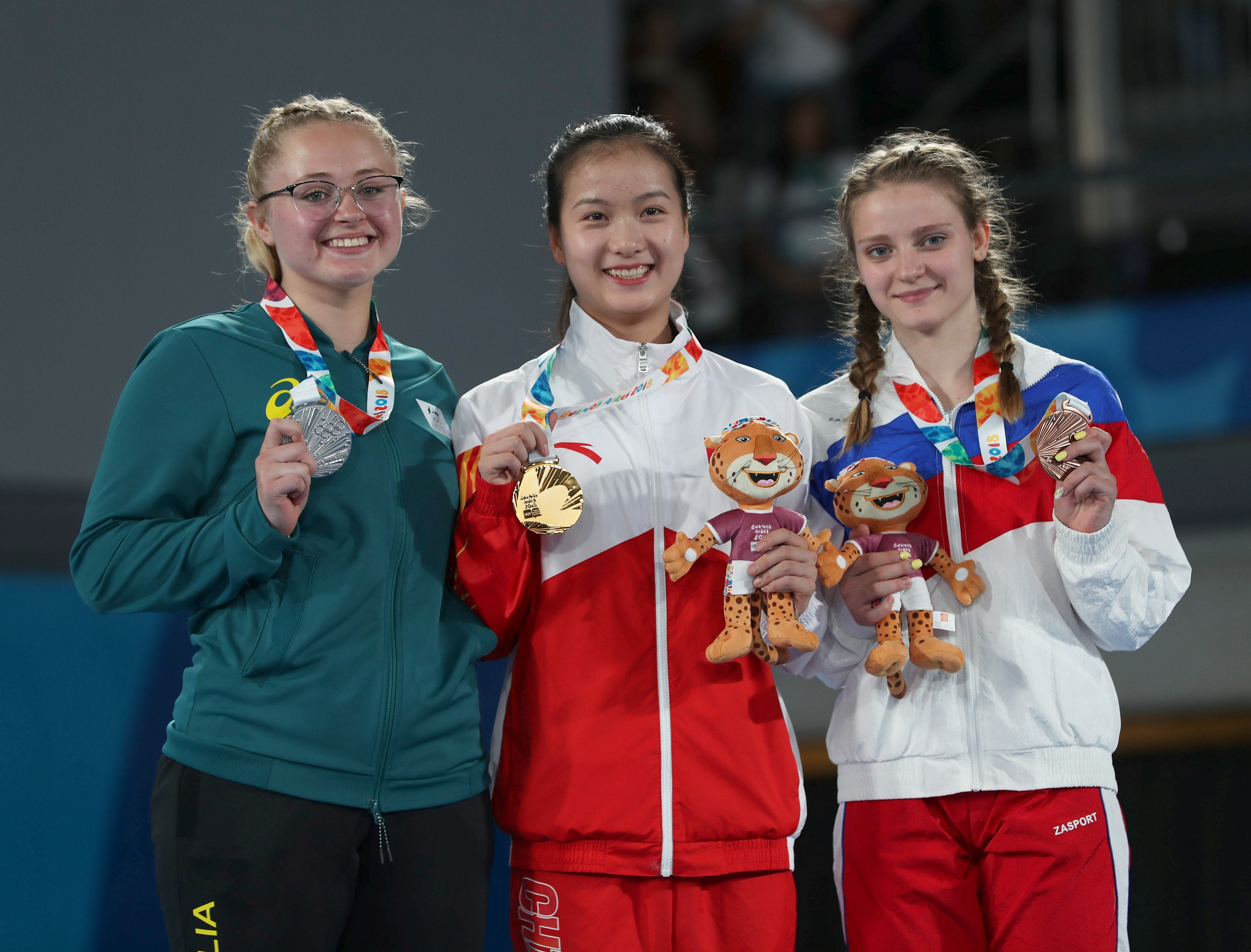
Girls victory ceremony (from left to right): Jessica Pickering (Silver), Fan Xinyi (Gold), Vera Beliankina (Bronze)

=== Medal table ===
* Host nation (Argentina)

Rank	Nation	Gold	Silver	Bronze	Total
1	Japan	5	0	0	5
2	China	4	1	2	7
3	Italy	3	1	1	5
4	Russia	2	3	3	8
–	Mixed-NOCs	1	1	1	3
5	Bulgaria	1	0	0	1
5	United States	1	0	0	1
7	Great Britain	0	3	1	4
8	Ukraine	0	2	3	5
9	Hungary	0	2	1	3
10	Brazil	0	1	1	2
10	Canada	0	1	1	2
12	Australia	0	1	0	1
12	Israel	0	1	0	1
14	Austria	0	0	1	1
14	Iran	0	0	1	1
14	Norway	0	0	1	1
Totals (16 entries)		17	17	17	51
