= Fan Xinyi =

Chinese trampoline gymnast

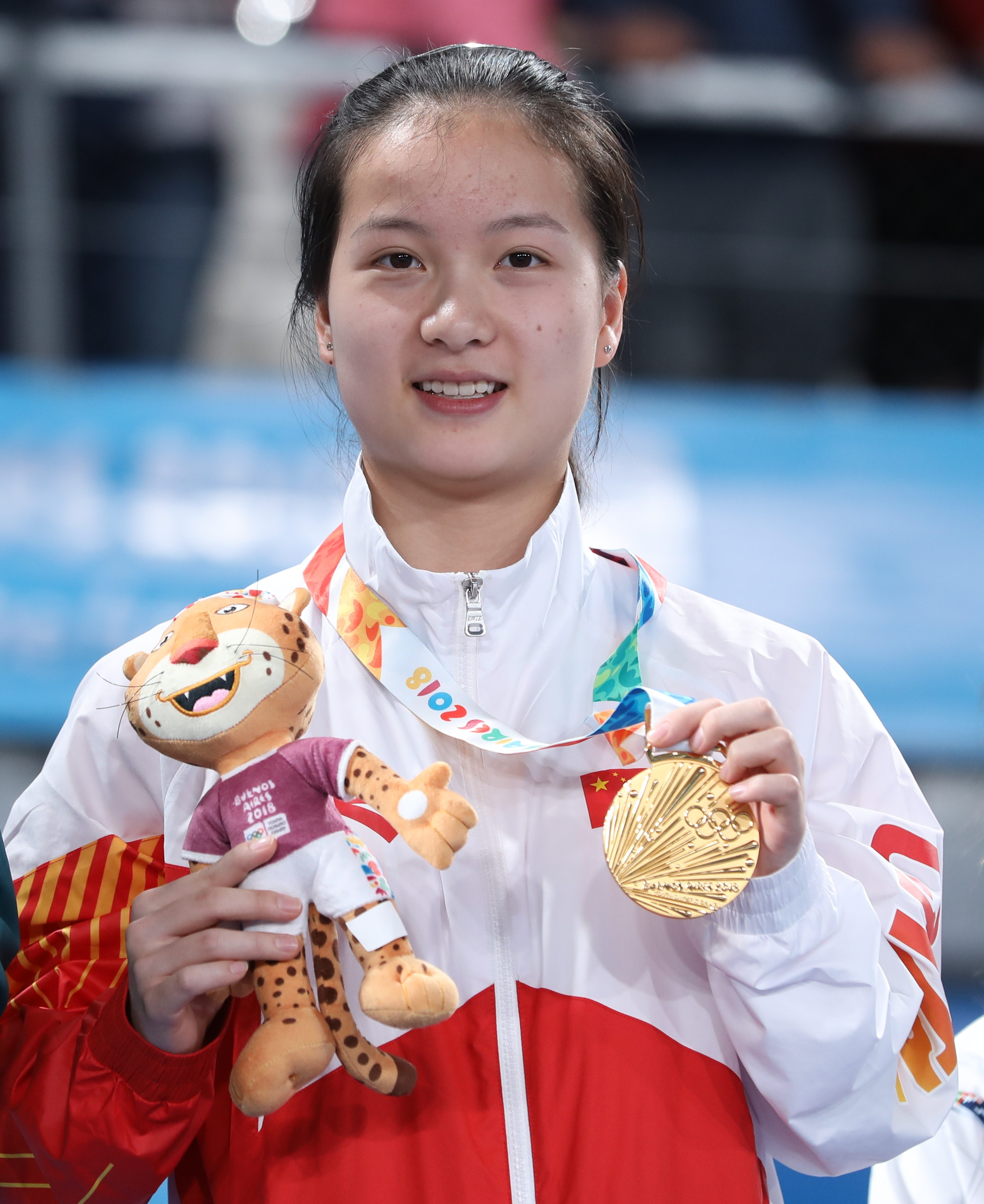
- Fan Xinyi at the 2018 Summer Youth Olympics

Personal information
- Born: 26 January 2002 (age 24)

Gymnastics career
- Discipline: Trampoline gymnastics
- Country represented: China
Medal record
Women's trampoline gymnastics
Representing China
World Championships
| Gold medal – first place | 2025 Pamplona | Individual Team |
| Gold medal – first place | 2025 Pamplona | All-Around Team |
| Silver medal – second place | 2021 Baku | Individual team |
| Bronze medal – third place | 2019 Tokyo | All-around Team |
Youth Olympic Games
| Gold medal – first place | 2018 Buenos Aires | Individual |
Representing (International Olympic Committee) Mixed-NOCs
Youth Olympic Games
| Gold medal – first place | 2018 Buenos Aires | Mixed team |

Fan Xinyi (born 26 January 2002) is a Chinese trampoline gymnast. She won the gold medal in the girls' trampoline event at the 2018 Summer Youth Olympics held in Buenos Aires, Argentina. She also won the gold medal in the mixed multi-discipline team event.

At the 2018 Asian Trampoline Gymnastics Championships held in Makati, Philippines, she won the gold medal in the women's junior event.

In 2019, she won the bronze medal in the mixed all-around team event at the Trampoline Gymnastics World Championships held in Tokyo, Japan.
