= Triathlon at the 2018 Summer Youth Olympics =

Triathlon at the III Summer Youth Olympic Games
- Venue: Parque Tres de Febrero
- Dates: 7–11 October
- No. of events: 3 (1 boys, 1 girls, 1 mixed)
- Competitors: 64 (32 boys, 32 girls) from 42 nations

Triathlon at the 2018 Summer Youth Olympics was held from 7 to 11 October. The events took place at Parque Tres de Febrero in Buenos Aires, Argentina.

== Qualification ==
Each National Olympic Committee (NOC) could enter a maximum of 2 competitors, 1 per each gender. As hosts, Argentina was given the maximum quota and a further 4, 2 in each gender was decided by the Tripartite Commission. The remaining 58 places were to be decided by qualification events, namely five continental qualification tournaments.

To be eligible to participate at the Youth Olympics athletes must have been born between 1 January 2001 and 31 December 2002.

Event	Location	Date	Total Places	Qualified Boys	Qualified Girls
Host Nation	-	-	1	Argentina	Argentina
2018 Oceania YOG Qualifier	(New Zealand) New Plymouth	25 March 2018	2	Australia; New Zealand	Australia; New Zealand
2018 Africa YOG Qualifier	(Morocco) Rabat	21 April 2018	3	South Africa; Tunisia; Egypt	South Africa; Tunisia; Egypt
2018 Asian YOG Qualifier	(Philippines) Subic Bay	17 June 2018	5	Japan; ~~China~~; Hong Kong; Malaysia; Syria; Kazakhstan	Singapore; South Korea; China; Japan; Hong Kong
2018 American YOG Qualifier	(Ecuador) Salinas	1 July 2018	7/8	Mexico; Canada; United States; Ecuador; Chile; Brazil; Colombia	United States; Mexico; Ecuador; Brazil; Venezuela; Peru; Cuba; Colombia
2018 European YOG Qualifier	(Spain) Banyoles	7–8 July 2018	12	France; Portugal; Hungary; Italy; Sweden; Israel; Germany; Switzerland; Great Britain; Belgium; Spain; Slovenia	Italy; France; Portugal; Russia; Switzerland; Hungary; Great Britain; Luxembourg; Netherlands; Belgium; Germany; Denmark
Tripartite Invitation	-	-	2/1	Aruba; Virgin Islands	Grenada
TOTAL			32		

- The second female tripartite spot was not awarded and thus it was reallocated to the Americas, as per the qualification system.

== Schedule ==
The schedule is expected to be released by the Buenos Aires Youth Olympic Games Organizing Committee.

All times are ART (UTC-3)

Event date	Event day	Starting time	Event details
October 7	Sunday	11:00	Girls' Race
October 8	Monday	11:00	Boys' Race
October 11	Thursday	11:00	Mixed Team Relay

== Medal summary ==
=== Medal table ===
Rank	Nation	Gold	Silver	Bronze	Total
–	Mixed-NOCs	1	1	1	3
1	New Zealand	1	0	0	1
1	South Africa	1	0	0	1
3	Denmark	0	1	0	1
3	Portugal	0	1	0	1
5	Italy	0	0	1	1
5	Switzerland	0	0	1	1
Totals (6 entries)		3	3	3	9

=== Events ===
Event	Gold	Silver	Bronze
Boys'	Dylan McCullough; New Zealand	Alexandre Montez; Portugal	Alessio Crociani; Italy
Girls'	Amber Schlebusch; South Africa	Sif Bendix Madsen; Denmark	Anja Weber; Switzerland
Mixed Relay	Europe 1 Sif Bendix Madsen (DEN); Alessio Crociani (ITA); Anja Weber (SUI); Alexandre Montez (POR)	Oceania 1 Charlotte Derbyshire (AUS); Dylan McCullough (NZL); Brea Roderick (NZL); Joshua Ferris (AUS)	Europe 3 Marie Horn (GER); Henry Graf (GER); Emilie Noyer (FRA); Igor Bellido (ESP)
