= Canada at the 2018 Summer Youth Olympics =

- Flag of Canada
- IOC code: CAN
- NOC: Canadian Olympic Committee
- Website: www.olympic.ca (in English and French)

in Buenos Aires, Argentina
- Competitors: 72 in 20 sports
- Flag bearers: Jérémy Chartier (opening); Emma Spence (closing)
- Medals Ranked 65th: Gold 0 Silver 3 Bronze 6 Total 9

Summer Youth Olympics appearances
- 2010; 2014; 2018; 2026

Canada competed at the 2018 Summer Youth Olympics, in Buenos Aires, Argentina from October 6th to 18th.

The Canadian team consisted of 71 athletes competing in 20 sports and was officially named on September 25, 2018. It was announced on October 4, 2018, that Canada received an additional reallocated spot in boxing, meaning the total team size was 72 athletes (33 men and 39 women).

On October 3, 2018, trampolinist Jérémy Chartier was named as the flag bearer during the opening ceremony.

All nations can qualify only a maximum of one team sport per gender and Canada chose men's field hockey and women's rugby sevens.

== Competitors ==
The following is the list of number of competitors participating at the Games per sport/discipline.

Sport	Men	Women	Total
Archery	1	0	1
Athletics (track and field)	5	10	15
Badminton	1	0	1
Beach volleyball	0	2	2
Boxing	2	0	2
Dancesport	1	1	2
Diving	1	1	2
Fencing	1	2	3
Field hockey	9	0	9
Golf	1	1	2
Gymnastics	2	2	4
Judo	1	1	2
Rowing	0	1	1
Rugby sevens	0	12	12
Shooting	1	0	1
Sport climbing	0	1	1
Swimming	4	4	8
Taekwondo	1	0	1
Triathlon	1	0	1
Wrestling	1	1	2
Total	33	39	72

== Medallists ==
Medals awarded to participants of mixed-NOC (combined) teams are represented in italics. These medals are not counted towards the individual NOC medal tally.

Medal	Name	Sport	Event	Date
Gold	Brian Yang	Badminton	Mixed team relay	October 12
Silver	Emma Misak	Dancesport	B-Girls'	October 8
Silver	Madison Broad	Swimming	Girls' 200 metre backstroke	October 9
Silver	Felix Dolci	Gymnastics	Boys' rings	October 14
Bronze	Keagan Young	Judo	Boys' 81 kg	October 8
Bronze	Finlay Knox	Swimming	Boys' 200 metre individual medley	October 8
Bronze	Rachel Krapman	Judo	Mixed team	October 10
Bronze	Ethan McClymont	Taekwondo	Boys' +73 kg	October 11
Bronze	Alexander Milanovich	Swimming	Boys' 50 metre breaststroke	October 12
Bronze	Emma Spence	Gymnastics	Girls' vault	October 13
Bronze	Delaney Aikens; Taylor Black; Kendra Cousineau; Hunter Czeppel; Olivia De Couvreur; Brooklynn Feasby; Lizzie Gibson; Madison Grant; Carmen Izyk; Aleisha Lewis; Maggie Mackinnon; Keyara Wardley	Rugby sevens	Girls' tournament	October 15

Medals by sport
Sport	1st place, gold medalist(s)	2nd place, silver medalist(s)	3rd place, bronze medalist(s)	Total
Swimming	0	1	2	3
Gymnastics	0	1	1	2
Dancesport	0	1	0	1
Judo	0	0	1	1
Rugby sevens	0	0	1	1
Taekwondo	0	0	1	1
Total	0	3	6	9

Medals by day
Day	1st place, gold medalist(s)	2nd place, silver medalist(s)	3rd place, bronze medalist(s)	Total
7 October	0	0	0	0
8 October	0	1	2	3
9 October	0	1	0	0
10 October	0	0	0	0
11 October	0	0	1	1
12 October	0	0	1	1
13 October	0	0	1	1
14 October	0	1	0	1
15 October	0	0	1	1
Total	0	3	6	9

== Archery ==
Canada qualified one boy.

Individual

Athlete	Event	Ranking round		Round of 32	Round of 16	Quarterfinals	Semifinals	Final / BM	Rank
Athlete	Event	Score	Seed	Opposition Score	Opposition Score	Opposition Score	Opposition Score	Opposition Score	Rank
Benjamen Lee	Boys' singles	636	28	Akash (IND); L 5–6	Did not advance				=17

Team

Athletes	Event	Ranking round		Round of 32	Round of 16	Quarterfinals	Semifinals	Final / BM	Rank
Athletes	Event	Score	Seed	Opposition Score	Opposition Score	Opposition Score	Opposition Score	Opposition Score	Rank
Benjamen Lee (CAN); Chang Rong-jia (TPE)	Mixed team	1298	22	Touraine-Helias (FRA); Solera (ESP); L 0–6	Did not advance				17

== Athletics (track and field) ==
Canada qualified 15 athletes (five boys and ten girls). This marks Canada's largest track and field team at the Youth Olympics.

Boys

- Evan Burke – 3000 m
- Adam Exley – 110 m hurdles
- Joakim Généreux – 200 m
- Lucas Woodhall – Shot put
- Skyler York – 2000 m steeplechase

Girls

- Mérédith Boyer – 2000 m steeplechase
- Dolly Gabri – Discus
- Olivia Gee – 100 m hurdles
- Kendra Lewis – 1500 m
- Julia Lovsin – 400 m hurdles
- Jasneet Nijjar – 400 m
- Donna Ntambue – 100 m
- Cameron Ormond – 3000 m
- Princess Roberts – 200 m
- Alexzandra Throndson – Pole vault

== Badminton ==
Canada qualified one boy based on the Badminton Junior World Rankings.

Boy

Athlete	Event	Group stage				Quarterfinal	Semifinal	Final / BM	Rank
Athlete	Event	Opposition Score	Opposition Score	Opposition Score	Rank	Opposition Score	Opposition Score	Opposition Score	Rank
Brian Yang	Singles	Resch (GER); L 0–2 (13–21, 18–21)	Barth (NOR); W 2–1 (17–21, 21–19, 21–19)	Merklé (FRA); L 1–2 (15–21, 21–17, 7–21)	3	Did not advance			

Team

Athlete	Event	Group stage				Quarterfinal	Semifinal	Final / BM	Rank
Athlete	Event	Opposition Score	Opposition Score	Opposition Score	Rank	Opposition Score	Opposition Score	Opposition Score	Rank
Team Alpha; Brian Yang (CAN); Lakshya Sen (IND); Giovanni Toti (ITA); Vannthoun Vath (CAM); Hasini Nusaka Ambalangodage (SRI); Maria Delcheva (BUL); Jennie Gai (USA); Ashwathi Pillai (SWE)	Mixed team relay	Epsilon (MIX); W 110–98	Delta (MIX); L 99–110	Zeta (MIX); W 110–103	2 Q	Gamma (MIX); W 110–94	Theta (MIX); W 110–90	Omega (MIX); W 110–106	1st place, gold medalist(s)

== Beach volleyball ==
Canada received a reallocated spot to enter a girls team of two athletes.

Girls

Athlete	Event	Preliminary round	Standing	Round of 24	Round of 16	Quarterfinals	Semifinals	Final / BM	
Athlete	Event	Opposition Score	Standing	Opposition Score	Opposition Score	Opposition Score	Opposition Score	Opposition Score	Rank
Dana Roskic & Erika Vermette	Girls'	Pool B Bocharova – Voronina (RUS); L 0–2 (15–21, 15–21); Galil – dos Santos (BRA); L 0–2 (14–21, 10–21); Lockhart-Burton (DMA); W 2–0 (21–8, 21–8)	3 Q	Allcca–Mendoza (PER); L 1–2 (19–21, 21–15, 12–15)	Did not advance				=17

== Boxing ==
Canada received a reallocated spot to enter a boy. Canada later received another reallocated spot to send an additional male athlete.

Boys

Athlete	Event	Quarterfinals	Semifinals	Final / BM	Rank
Athlete	Event	Opposition Result	Opposition Result	Opposition Result	Rank
Spencer Wilcox	−60 kg	Safarov (AZE); L 2–3	Phoemsap (THA); L 1–4	Murdoch-Mckeich (NZL); W 5–0	5
Tethluach Chuol	+91 kg	Vaisilika Tuigamala (SAM); W 5–0	Toibay (KAZ); L 0–5	Awad (EGY); L 0–5	4

== Dancesport ==
Canada qualified two dancers based on its performance at the 2018 World Youth Breaking Championship.

Individual

Athlete	Event	Preliminary Round		Quarterfinals	Semifinals	Final	
Athlete	Event	Votes	Seed	Opposition Score	Opposition Score	Opposition Score	Rank
Mathieu Du Ruisseau (D-Matt)	B-Boys'	16	6 Q	Sergei Chernyshev (Bumblebee) (RUS); L 0–4	Did not advance		7
Emma Misak (Emma)	B-Girls'	19	5 Q	Senorita Carlota (Carlota Dudek) (FRA); W 3–1	Kristina Yashina (Matina) (RUS); W 2–2	Ramu Kawai (Ram) (JPN); L 0–4	2nd place, silver medalist(s)

== Diving ==
Athlete	Event	Preliminary		Final	
Athlete	Event	Points	Rank	Points	Rank
Bryden Hattie	Boys' 3m springboard	517.95	4 Q	504.50	8
Bryden Hattie	Boys' 10m platform	505.70	5 Q	439.85	9
Mélodie Leclerc	Girls' 3m springboard	406.45	7 Q	400.90	9
Mélodie Leclerc	Girls' 10m platform	346.45	7 Q	347.35	7
Mélodie Leclerc (CAN); Jellson Jabillin (MAS)	Mixed Team	—N/a		330.00	7
Bryden Hattie (CAN); Maria Papworth (GBR)	Mixed Team	—N/a		340.50	5

== Fencing ==
Canada qualified three fencers (one male and two female).

Individual

Athlete	Event	Pool Round		Round of 16	Quarterfinals	Semifinals	Final	
Athlete	Event	Victories	Seed	Opposition Score	Opposition Score	Opposition Score	Opposition Score′	Rank
Seraphim Jarov	Boys' épée	2	8	Issac Herbst (USA); L 13–15	Did not advance			9
Ariane Leonard	Girls' épée	4	5	Marie Abou Jaoude (LBN); W 15–6	Axelle Wasiak (BEL); L 12–15	Did not advance		6
Jane Caulfield	Girls' foil	5	4	Giorgia Salmas (AUS); W 15–8	Anabella Gonzalez (VEN); L 5–14	Did not advance		5

Team

Athlete	Event	Quarterfinal	Semifinal	Final / BM	Placement 5-8	Placement 7-8	Rank
Athlete	Event	Opposition Score	Opposition Score	Opposition Score	Opposition Score	Opposition Score	Rank
Americas 2 Hudson Santana (PUR); Alexis Anglade (USA); Diego Cervantes (MEX); Anabella Acurero Gonzalez (VEN); Seraphim Jarov (CAN); Ariane Leonard (CAN)	Mixed Teams	Americas 1 (MIX); L (15–30)	Did not advance		Asia-Oceania 2 (MIX); L (29–30)	Africa (MIX); W (30–15)	7

== Field hockey ==
Canada qualified a boys' team of nine athletes after a bronze medal finish at the Pan American qualification event in Guadalajara, Mexico in March 2018. The team was officially named on September 12, 2018.

=== Boys' tournament ===
Roster

- Amraaz Dhillon
- Arjun Hothi
- Brendan Guraliuk
- Ethan McTavish
- Ganga Singh
- Isaac Farion
- Joshua Kuempel
- Rowan Childs
- Shazab Butt

Pool B

Pos	Team	Pld	W	D	L	GF	GA	GD	Pts	Qualification
1	Australia	5	5	0	0	23	9	+14	15	Quarterfinals
2	India	5	4	0	1	34	8	+26	12	Quarterfinals
3	Austria	5	3	0	2	11	16	−5	9	Quarterfinals
4	Bangladesh	5	2	0	3	12	22	−10	6	Quarterfinals
5	Canada	5	1	0	4	13	22	−9	3	9th place game
6	Kenya	5	0	0	5	10	26	−16	0	11th place game

Source: FIH
Rules for classification: 1) Points; 2) Goal difference; 3) Goals scored; 4) Head-to-head result.

7 October 2018
12:30

Canada	2–3	Austria
Childs 6'; Butt 12'	Report	Wellan 3'; Matousek 5', 13'

Umpires:
Nick Saunders (NZL)
Jonathan Altamirano (MEX)

8 October 2018
15:30

Kenya	3–4	Canada
Ogenche 18', 20'; Ouma 19'	Report	Singh 1'; Farion 5'; Butt 6'; Childs 15'

Umpires:
Hideki Kinoshita (JPN)
Darren Hubach (RSA)

9 October 2018
11:00

Canada	3–6	Australia
Guraliuk 10', 13'; G. Singh 15'	Report	C. Marais 1'; Murray 4', 20'; Davis 7'; Carr 9'; Collins 19'

Umpires:
Hideki Kinoshita (JPN)
Jonathan Altamirano (MEX)

10 October 2018
16:15

Bangladesh	5–2	Canada
Alam 8', 16'; H. Mohammad 12'; Sobuj 13'; Hossain 17'	Report	Butt 3'; Singh 18'

Umpires:
Hideki Kinoshita (JPN)
Darren Hubach (RSA)

11 October 2018
13:15

Canada	2–5	India
Childs 15', 16'	Report	Sanjay 4', 17'; Anand 7'; Chirmako 10'; Rajbhar 17'

Umpires:
Jonathan Altamirano (MEX)
Hristiyan Vasilev (BUL)

9th place match

12 October 2018
13:00

Mexico	2–1	Canada
Hernández 3'; Palma 6'	Report	Dhillon 13'

Umpires:
Hideki Kinoshita (JPN)
James Unkles (AUS)

== Golf ==
Canada qualified one boy and one girl.

Individual

Athlete	Event	Round 1		Round 2			Round 3			Total		
Athlete	Event	Score	Rank	Score	Total	Rank	Score	Total	Rank	Score	Par	Rank
Celeste Dao	Girls' Individual	75 (+5)	11	72 (+2)	147	5	76 (+6)	223	19	223	+13	13
William Duquette	Boys' Individual	80 (+10)	28	79 (+9)	159	30	82 (+12)	241	28	241	+31	28

Team

Athletes	Event	Round 1 (Fourball)		Round 2 (Foursome)		Round 3 (Individual Stroke)				Total	
Athletes	Event	Score	Rank	Score	Rank	Boy	Girl	Total	Rank	Score	Rank
Celeste Dao; William Duquette	Mixed team	65 (-5)	10	77 (+7)	21	74 (+4)	74 (+4)	148 (+8)	16	290 (+10)	22

== Gymnastics ==
Canada qualified four gymnasts (two boys and two girls). The team was officially named on August 31, 2018.

=== Artistic ===
Canada qualified two gymnasts based on its performance at the 2018 American Junior Championship.

Boys'
Individual Qualification

Athlete	Event	Apparatus						Total	Rank
Athlete	Event	F	PH	R	V	PB	HB	Total	Rank
Félix Dolci	Individual	13.433 Q	12.133	13.466 Q	14.200 Q	12.500	13.233 Q	78.965	7 Q

Individual Finals

Athlete	Event	Apparatus						Total	Rank
Athlete	Event	F	PH	R	V	PB	HB	Total	Rank
Félix Dolci	All-around	11.933	12.400	13.433	13.933	12.900	12.983	77.582	9
Félix Dolci	Floor	13.333	—N/a					13.333	6
Félix Dolci	Rings	—N/a		13.366	—N/a			13.366	2nd place, silver medalist(s)
Félix Dolci	Vault	—N/a			13.455	—N/a		13.455	7
Félix Dolci	Parallel bars	—N/a				11.300	—N/a	11.300	8

Girls
Individual Qualification

Athlete	Event	Apparatus				Total	Rank
Athlete	Event	V	UB	BB	F	Total	Rank
Emma Spence	Individual	13.916 Q	12.133	12.433 Q	12.533 Q	51.015	6 Q

Individual Finals

Athlete	Event	Apparatus				Total	Rank
Athlete	Event	V	UB	BB	F	Total	Rank
Emma Spence	All-around	13.900	12.666	10.900	11.666	49.132	10
Emma Spence	Vault	13.483	—N/a			13.483	3rd place, bronze medalist(s)
Emma Spence	Balance beam	—N/a		10.366	—N/a	10.366	8
Emma Spence	Floor	—N/a			12.400	12.400	5

=== Rhythmic ===
Canada qualified one gymnast based on its performance at the 2018 American Junior Championship.

- Girls' rhythmic individual all-around - 1 quota (Natalie Garcia)

=== Trampoline ===
Canada qualified one gymnasts based on its performance at the 2018 American Junior Championship.

- Boys' trampoline - 1 quota (Jérémy Chartier)

== Judo ==
Canada qualified the maximum team size of one boy and one girl. Both athletes have to compete in one weight category higher as their weight category is not represented in the Youth Olympics.

Individual

Athlete	Event	Round of 16	Quarterfinals	Semifinals	Rep 1	Rep 2	Final / BM	Rank
Athlete	Event	Opposition Result	Opposition Result	Opposition Result	Opposition Result	Opposition Result	Opposition Result	Rank
Keagan Young	Boys' -81 kg	Bye	Rebahi (ALG); L 000–101	Did not advance	Farukhi (MAR); W 100–000	Páez (VEN); W 012–001	Barto (SVK); W 001–001	3rd place, bronze medalist(s)
Rachel Krapman	Girls' -63 kg	Ozbas (HUN); L 001–110	Did not advance		Pecha (MEX); L 000–100	Did not advance		9

Team

Athletes	Event	Round of 16	Quarterfinals	Semifinals	Final	
Athletes	Event	Opposition Result	Opposition Result	Opposition Result	Opposition Result	Rank
Team Sydney; Giorgia Hagianu (ROU); Euclides Lopes (GBS); Irena Khubulova (RUS); Simon Zulu (ZAM); Fatime Barka Segue (CHA); Keagan Young (CAN); Shakhida Narmukhamedova (KGZ); Ömer Aydın (TUR)	Mixed team	Team Rio de Janeiro (MIX); L 4–3	Did not advance			9
Team London; Yangchen Wangmo (BHU); Daniel Leutgeb (AUT); Noemi Huayhuameza Orneta (PER); Joao Santos (BRA); Rachel Krapman (CAN); Ahmed Rebahi (ALG); Edith Ortiz (ECU); Bekarys Saduakas (KAZ)	Mixed team	Bye	Team Moscow (MIX); W 4–3	Team Beijing (MIX); L 0–7	Did not advance	3rd place, bronze medalist(s)

== Rowing ==
Canada qualified one girls in the women's single sculls after being ranked in the top 8 (among eligible nations) at the 2017 World Championships in Trakai, Lithuania. The rower representing Canada was officially announced on September 10, 2018.

Girls

- Single sculls - 1 quota (Grace VandenBroek)

== Rugby sevens ==
Canada qualified a girls' team of twelve athletes after winning the North American qualification event in Las Vegas in March 2018. Canada's 12 women roster was named on August 29, 2018.

=== Girls' tournament ===
Roster

- Delaney Aikens
- Taylor Black
- Kendra Cousineau
- Hunter Czeppel
- Olivia De Couvreur
- Brooklynn Feasby
- Lizzie Gibson
- Madison Grant
- Carmen Izyk
- Aleisha Lewis
- Maggie Mackinnon
- Keyara Wardley

Pool A

Pos	Team	Pld	W	D	L	PF	PA	PD	Pts
1	New Zealand	5	5	0	0	169	27	+142	15
2	France	5	4	0	1	178	45	+133	13
3	Canada	5	3	0	2	125	85	+40	11
4	Colombia	5	2	0	3	66	119	−53	9
5	Kazakhstan	5	1	0	4	44	142	−98	7
6	Tunisia	5	0	0	5	19	183	−164	5

Source: Buenos Aires 2018
Rules for classification: 1) Points; 2) Head-to-head result; 3) Point difference; 4) Points scored.

13 October 2018
12:50

Canada	24–15	Kazakhstan
Try: Grant 2'c Black 4'm de Couvreur 6'm Izyk 13'c Con: Black (2/4) 2', 13'	Report	Try: Odnoletok (3) 8'm, 10'm, 12'm Con: Mikhailenko (0/3)

Club Atlético San Isidro, Buenos Aires
Referee: Lauren Jenner (New Zealand)

13 October 2018
15:55

Canada	50–7	Tunisia
Try: Cousineau (3) 0'c, 7'm, 8'm Grant (2) 3'c, 5'c de Couvreur 7'c MacKinnon 13'm Izyk 14'c Con: Black (3/3) 1', 3', 5'; Czeppel (2/5) 7', 14'	Report	Try: Arbi 12'c Con: Ben Charrada (1/1) 12'

Club Atlético San Isidro, Buenos Aires
Referee: Ashleigh Murray (South Africa)

14 October 2018
12:25

Canada	27–10	Colombia
Try: Lewis 1'm Aikens (2) 2'm, 14'm Black 4'm Wardley 10'c Con: Black (1/4) 10'; Cousineau (0/1)	Report	Try: Mejia 11'm Jimenez 13'; Con: Tapias (0/1)

Club Atlético San Isidro, Buenos Aires
Referee: Maddy Putz (Australia)

14 October 2018
15:05

New Zealand	20–5	Canada
Try: Maaka 7'm Tairakena (2) 10'm, 12'm Risaleaana Pouri-Lane 13'm Con: Risaleaana Pouri-Lane (0/4)	Report	Try: Wardley 4'm Con: Black (0/1)

Club Atlético San Isidro, Buenos Aires
Referee: Katherine Ritchie (Great Britain)

15 October 2018
10:15

France	33–19	Canada
Try: Escudero 3'c Hapulat (3) 7'm, 9'c, 13'c Christiaens 11'c Con: Christiaens (3/4) 3', 9', 11'; Maran (1/1) 14'	Report	Try: Aikens (2) 0'm, 7'c Con: Black (1/2) 7'

Club Atlético San Isidro, Buenos Aires
Referee: Maddy Putz (Australia)

Bronze medal match

15 October 2018
14:45

(bronze) Canada	24–19	Colombia
Try: Grant (2) 1'm, 11'c Black 3'c Izyk 12'm Con: Black (2/4) 4', 11'	Report	Try: Tapias 5'; Ibarra 7'm Mejia 9'c Con: Tapias (2/2) 6', 10'; Mejia (0/1)

Club Atlético San Isidro, Buenos Aires
Referee: Lauren Jenner (New Zealand)

== Shooting ==
Canada qualified one sport shooter based on its performance at the American Qualification Tournament.

Individual

Athlete	Event	Qualification		Final	
Athlete	Event	Points	Rank	Points	Rank
Brian Wai Kuk Ng	Boys' 10m Air Pistol	548–6x	18	Did not advance	

Team

Athletes	Event	Qualification		Round of 16	Quarterfinals	Semifinals	Final / BM	Rank
Athletes	Event	Points	Rank	Opposition Result	Opposition Result	Opposition Result	Opposition Result	Rank
Brian Wai Kuk Ng (CAN); Nino Khutsiberidze (GEO)	Mixed Team 10m Air Pistol	740-17x	11Q	Rueda Vargas (COL); Karstedt (GER); L 7–10	Did not advance			12

== Sport climbing ==
Canada received a reallocated quota to send a girl.

- Girls' combined - 1 quota (Cat Carkner)

Athlete	Event	Qualification					Final				
Athlete	Event	Speed	Bouldering	Lead	Total	Rank	Speed	Bouldering	Lead	Total	Rank
Cat Carkner	Girls' combined	18	16	19	5472	18	did not advance				

== Swimming ==
Canada's swimming team of eight athletes (four per gender) was announced on April 9, 2018. Canada qualified a full quota of eight athletes. However, changes were made which removed gold medal favourites Gabe Mastromatteo and Margaret MacNeil, along with Alexander Pratt off the team. They were removed and replaced, because they were not available for the games.

Boys

Athlete	Event	Heat		Semifinal		Final	
Athlete	Event	Time	Rank	Time	Rank	Time	Rank
Joshua Liendo	50 m freestyle	23.28	16 Q	23.38	16	Did not advance	
Joshua Liendo	100 m freestyle	51.60	21	Did not advance			
Joshua Liendo	100 m butterfly	54.56	19	Did not advance			
Joshua Liendo	200 m butterfly	2.05.11	23	—N/a		Did not advance	
Sebastian Somerset	50 m backstroke	26.30	7 Q	26.45	11	Did not advance	
Sebastian Somerset	100 m backstroke	56.84	12 Q	56.98	15	Did not advance	
Sebastian Somerset	200 m backstroke	2:05.47	16	—N/a		Did not advance	
Alexander Milanovich	50 m breaststroke	28.46	5 Q	28.19	3 Q	27.87	3rd place, bronze medalist(s)
Alexander Milanovich	100 m breaststroke	1:03.88	17	Did not advance			
Finlay Knox	200 m breaststroke	2:21.46	18	—N/a		Did not advance	
Finlay Knox	200 metre individual medley	2:04.17	2	—N/a		2:01.91	3rd place, bronze medalist(s)
Joshua Liendo; Sebastian Somerset; Alexander Milanovich; Finlay Knox	4 × 100 medley relay	3:46.23	6 Q	—N/a		3:45.45	6

Girls

Athlete	Event	Heat		Semifinal		Final	
Athlete	Event	Time	Rank	Time	Rank	Time	Rank
Kyla Leibel	50 m freestyle	26.19	14 Q	25.77	10	Did not advance	
Kyla Leibel	100 m freestyle	56.21	7 Q	55.93	7 Q	56.16	8
Kyla Leibel	200 m freestyle	2:02.69	12	—N/a		Did not advance	
Kyla Leibel	50 m butterfly	27.45	9 Q	27.30	11	Did not advance	
Madison Broad	50 m backstroke	28.95	5 Q	28.78	4 Q	29.12	7
Madison Broad	100 m backstroke	1:01.86	5 Q	1:01.66	5	1:01.37	5
Madison Broad	200 m backstroke	2:12.94	2 Q	—N/a		2:10.32	2nd place, silver medalist(s)
Nina Kucheran	50 m breaststroke	32.48	14 Q	32.17	7 Q	32.06	6
Nina Kucheran	100 m breaststroke	1:12.50	31	Did not advance			
Nina Kucheran	200 m breaststroke	DNS	DNS	—N/a		Did not advance	
Avery Wiseman	50 m breaststroke	31.81	3 Q	32.18	8 Q	32.79	8
Avery Wiseman	100 m breaststroke	1:10.63	10 Q	1.10.67	13	Did not advance	
Avery Wiseman	200 m breaststroke	2.36.71	25	—N/a		Did not advance	
Avery Wiseman	200 metre individual medley	2:21.83	24	—N/a		Did not advance	
Kyla Leibel; Madison Broad; Nina Kucheran; Avery Wiseman	4 × 100 medley relay	—N/a				DSQ	

Mixed relays

Athlete	Event	Heat		Final	
Athlete	Event	Time	Rank	Time	Rank
Joshua Liendo; Finlay Knox; Kyla Leibel; Nina Kucheran	4 × 100 metre freestyle relay	3:39.29	11	Did not advance	

== Taekwondo ==
Canada qualified one boy at the qualification event in April 2018 in Tunisia.

Boys

Athlete	Event	Quarterfinals	Semifinals	Final	Rank
Athlete	Event	Opposition Result	Opposition Result	Opposition Result	Rank
Ethan McClymont	+73 kg	Pilipović (NOR); W 12–11	Lee (TPE); L 7–15	Did not advance	3rd place, bronze medalist(s)

== Triathlon ==
Canada qualified one athlete based on its performance at the 2018 American Youth Olympic Games Qualifier.

Individual

Athlete	Event	Swim	Trans 1	Bike	Trans 2	Run	Total	Rank
Solen Wood	Boys'	11:14	0:34	28:45	0:28	15:55	56:56	16

Relay

Athlete	Event	Total Times per Athlete (Swim 250m, Bike 6.6 km, Run 1.8 km)	Total Group Time	Rank
Americas 3 Delfina Orlandini (ARG); Gabriel Teran Carvajal (ECU); Maria Fernanda Barbosa Sanchez (COL); Solen Wood (CAN)	Mixed Relay	22:49; 21:27; 24:52; 22:35	1:31:43	7

== Wrestling ==
Canada received two reallocated quota spots (one boy and one girl).

Key:

- VT - Victory by Fall.
- PP - Decision by Points - the loser with technical points.
- PO - Decision by Points - the loser without technical points.

Boys

Athlete	Event	Group stage					Final / RM	Rank
Athlete	Event	Opposition Score	Opposition Score	Opposition Score	Opposition Score	Rank	Opposition Score	Rank
Carson Lee	Boys' freestyle -80kg	Benferdjallah (ALG); L 7–8	Yairegpie (FSM); W 11–0	—N/a		2	Mukhammadrasul Rakhimov (UZB); L 0–10	4
Anika White	Girls' freestyle -73kg	Ludgate (ASA); W 6–0	Potrille (CUB); L 0–10	Fridlund (SWE); L 0–10	Kagami (JPN); L 0–10	4	Jlassi (TUN); L 0–4	8

== See also ==
- Canada at the 2018 Winter Olympics
- Canada at the 2018 Winter Paralympics
- Canada at the 2018 Commonwealth Games
