= Norway at the 2018 Summer Youth Olympics =

- IOC code: NOR
- NOC: Norwegian Olympic and Paralympic Committee and Confederation of Sports
- Website: https://www.idrettsforbundet.no/

in Buenos Aires, Argentina 6 – 18 October 2018
- Competitors: 16 in 10 sports
- Medals Ranked 35th: Gold 2 Silver 1 Bronze 3 Total 6

Summer Youth Olympics appearances
- 2010; 2014; 2018; 2026

Norway participated at the 2018 Summer Youth Olympics in Buenos Aires, Argentina from 6 October to 18 October 2018.

== Badminton ==
Norway qualified one player based on the Badminton Junior World Rankings.

Singles

| Athlete | Event | Group stage | | | | Quarterfinal | Semifinal | Final / BM | Rank |
| Athlete | Event | Opposition Score | Opposition Score | Opposition Score | Rank | Opposition Score | Opposition Score | Opposition Score | Rank |
|---|---|---|---|---|---|---|---|---|---|
| Markus Barth | Boys' Singles | Merklé (FRA); L 0–2 | Yang (CAN); L 1–2 | Resch (GER); L 1–2 | 4 | did not advance | | | 9 |

Team

| Athlete | Event | Group stage | | | | Quarterfinal | Semifinal | Final / BM | Rank |
| Athlete | Event | Opposition Score | Opposition Score | Opposition Score | Rank | Opposition Score | Opposition Score | Opposition Score | Rank |
|---|---|---|---|---|---|---|---|---|---|
| Team Omega; Markus Barth (NOR); Oscar Guo (NZL); Chang Ho Kim (FIJ); Kunlavut Vitidsarn (THA); Huang Yin-hsuan (TPE); Léonice Huet (FRA); Anastasiya Prozorova (UKR); Vũ Thị Anh Thư (VIE) | Mixed Teams | Gamma (MIX); W (110–99) | Theta (MIX); W (110–100) | Sigma (MIX); W (110–98) | 1Q | Epsilon (MIX); W (110–102) | Zeta (MIX); W (110–109) | Alpha (MIX); L (106–110) | 2nd place, silver medalist(s) |

== Beach volleyball ==
Norway qualified a girls' team based on their performance at 2017-18 European Youth Continental Cup Final.

- Girls' tournament - 1 team of 2 athletes

| Athletes | Event | Preliminary round | | Round of 24 | Round of 16 | Quarterfinals | Semifinals | Final / BM | |
| Athletes | Event | Opposition Score | Rank | Opposition Score | Opposition Score | Opposition Score | Opposition Score | Opposition Score | Rank |
|---|---|---|---|---|---|---|---|---|---|
| Olimstad–Berntsen | Girls' tournament | Isatu–Iye (SLE); W 2–0; Allcca–Mendoza (PER); W 2–1; Sinaportar; Mucheza (MOZ); W 2–0 | 1 Q | Bye | Baumann–Betschart (SUI); W 2–0 | Thatsarida–Pawarun (THA); W 2–0 | Voronina–Bocharova (RUS); L 0–2 | Newberry–Sparks (USA); W 2–1 | 3rd place, bronze medalist(s) |

== Diving ==
| Athlete | Event | Preliminary | | Final | |
| Athlete | Event | Points | Rank | Points | Rank |
|---|---|---|---|---|---|
| Helle Tuxen | Girls' 3 m springboard | 367.65 | 13 | did not advance | |
| Helle Tuxen | Girls' 10 m platform | 310.50 | 9 | 300.75 | 9 |
| Helle Tuxen (NOR); Randal Willars (MEX) | Mixed team | —N/a | | 301.10 | 11 |

== Golf ==
Individual

| Athlete | Event | Round 1 | | Round 2 | | | Round 3 | | | Total | | |
| Athlete | Event | Score | Rank | Score | Total | Rank | Score | Total | Rank | Score | Par | Rank |
|---|---|---|---|---|---|---|---|---|---|---|---|---|
| Emilie Oeveraas | Girls' Individual | 71 (+1) | 2 | 76 (+6) | 147 | 18 | 73 (+3) | 220 | 7 | 220 | +10 | 5 |
| Baard Bjoernevik Skogen | Boys' Individual | 78 (+8) | 26 | 70 (0) | 148 | 5 | 71 (+1) | 219 | 6 | 219 | +9 | 11 |

Team

| Athletes | Event | Round 1 (Fourball) | | Round 2 (Foursome) | | Round 3 (Individual Stroke) | | | | Total | | |
| Athletes | Event | Score | Rank | Score | Rank | Girl | Boy | Total | Rank | Score | Par | Rank |
|---|---|---|---|---|---|---|---|---|---|---|---|---|
| Emilie Oeveraas; Baard Bjoernevik Skogen | Mixed team | 66 (-4) | 16 | 77 (+7) | 21 | 73 | 69 | 142 (+2) | 4 | 285 | +5 | 12 |

== Gymnastics ==
=== Artistic ===
Norway qualified one gymnast based on its performance at the 2018 European Junior Championship.

- Boys' artistic individual all-around - 1 quota

Boys

| Athlete | Event | Apparatus | | | | | | Total | Rank |
| Athlete | Event | F | PH | R | V | PB | HB | Total | Rank |
|---|---|---|---|---|---|---|---|---|---|
| Jacob Karlsen | Qualification | 13.100 | 11.600 | 12.866 | 14.258 | 12.266 | 12.133 | 76.223 | 12 |
| Jacob Karlsen | All-around | 12.333 | 6.100 | 12.500 | 13.933 | 12.266 | 12.200 | 69.332 | 18 |

=== Rhythmic ===
Norway qualified one rhythmic gymnast based on its performance at the European qualification event.

- Girls' rhythmic individual all-around - 1 quota

Girls

| Athlete | Event | Qualification | | | | | | Final | | | | | |
| Athlete | Event | Hoop | Ball | Clubs | Ribbon | Total | Rank | Hoop | Ball | Clubs | Ribbon | Total | Rank |
|---|---|---|---|---|---|---|---|---|---|---|---|---|---|
| Josephine Juul Møller | All-around | 11.800 | 14.500 | 12.350 | 12.350 | 51.000 | 24 | did not advance | | | | | |

== Karate ==
Norway qualified one athlete based on its performance at one of the Karate Qualification Tournaments.

- Girls' +59kg - Annika Sælid

| Athlete | Event | Elimination round | | | | Semifinals | Final | |
| Athlete | Event | Opposition Score | Opposition Score | Opposition Score | Rank | Opposition Score | Opposition Score | Rank |
|---|---|---|---|---|---|---|---|---|
| Annika Sælid | Girls' +59 kg | Lauren Salisbury (GBR); W 2-0 | Sarah Al-Ameri (UAE); W 1-0 | Keli Kydonaki (GRE); W1-0 | 1 Q | Negin Altooni (IRI); W4-0 | Sakura Sawashima (JPN); W3-0 | 1st place, gold medalist(s) |

== Rowing ==
Norway qualified one boat based on its performance at the 2017 World Junior Rowing Championships.

- Boys' single sculls - 1 athlete

== Sailing ==
Norway qualified one boat based on its performance at the Techno 293+ European Qualifier.

- Girls' Techno 293+ - 1 boat

| Athlete | Event | Race | | | | | | | | | | | | | Net points | Final rank |
| Athlete | Event | 1 | 2 | 3 | 4 | 5 | 6 | 7 | 8 | 9 | 10 | 11 | 12 | M* | Net points | Final rank |
|---|---|---|---|---|---|---|---|---|---|---|---|---|---|---|---|---|
| Helle Oppedal | Girls' Techno 293+ | 15 | 18 | 9 | 17 | - | 18 | 11 | 12 | 14 | 8 | 10 | (13) | 16 | 148 | 16 |

== Swimming ==
Boys

| Athlete | Event | Heats | | Semifinals | | Final | |
| Athlete | Event | Time | Rank | Time | Rank | Time | Rank |
|---|---|---|---|---|---|---|---|
| Tomoe Zenimoto Hvas | 50 m backstroke | 26.14 | 3 | 25.12 | 2 | 25.28 | 3rd place, bronze medalist(s) |
| Tomoe Zenimoto Hvas | 100 m backstroke | 55.64 | 4 | 54.93 | 3 WD | did not advance | |
| Tomoe Zenimoto Hvas | 50 m butterfly | 24.20 | 5 | 24.07 | 5 | 23.63 | 2nd place, silver medalist(s) |
| Tomoe Zenimoto Hvas | 100 m butterfly | DNS | | did not advance | | | |
| Tomoe Zenimoto Hvas | 200 m individual medley | 1:59.77 | 1 | Bye | | 1:59.58 | 1st place, gold medalist(s) |
| André Klippenberg Grindheim | 50 m breaststroke | 28.55 | 7 | 28.93 | 12 | did not advance | |
| André Klippenberg Grindheim | 100 m breaststroke | 1:03.80 | 16 | 1:03.65 | 14 | did not advance | |
| André Klippenberg Grindheim | 200 m breaststroke | 2:19.61 | 14 | did not advance | | | |

Girls

| Athlete | Event | Heats | | Semifinals | | Final | |
| Athlete | Event | Time | Rank | Time | Rank | Time | Rank |
|---|---|---|---|---|---|---|---|
| Ingeborg Løyning | 50 m backstroke | 29.73 | 16 | 29.76 | 13 | did not advance | |
| Ingeborg Løyning | 100 m backstroke | 1:02.50 | 8 | 1:03.26 | 13 | did not advance | |
| Ingeborg Løyning | 200 m backstroke | 2:16.46 | 13 | did not advance | | | |
| Malene Rypestøl | 50 m backstroke | 29.77 | 17 | 29.81 | 14 | did not advance | |
| Malene Rypestøl | 200 m individual medley | 2:18.15 | 14 | did not advance | | | |

Mixed

| Athlete | Event | Heats | | Final | |
| Athlete | Event | Time | Rank | Time | Rank |
|---|---|---|---|---|---|
| Ingeborg Vassbakk Løyning; André Klippenberg Grindheim; Tomoe Zenimoto Hvas; Malene Rypestøl | 4×100 m medley relay | 3:57.33 | 5 | 3:56.75 | 4 |

== Taekwondo ==
| Athlete | Event | Quarterfinals | Semifinals | Final | |
| Athlete | Event | Opposition Result | Opposition Result | Opposition Result | Rank |
|---|---|---|---|---|---|
| Milos Pilipovic | Boys' +73 kg | Ethan McClymont (CAN); L 11-12 | did not advance | | |
