= Dominica at the 2018 Summer Youth Olympics =

- IOC code: DMA
- NOC: Dominica Olympic Committee

in Buenos Aires, Argentina 6 – 18 October 2018
- Competitors: 4 in 2 sports
- Medals: Gold 0 Silver 0 Bronze 0 Total 0

Summer Youth Olympics appearances
- 2010; 2014; 2018

Dominica participated at the 2018 Summer Youth Olympics in Buenos Aires, Argentina from 6 October to 18 October 2018.

== Competitors ==
The following is the list of number of competitors participating at the Games per sport/discipline.

| Sport | Men | Women | Total |
|---|---|---|---|
| Athletics | 1 | 1 | 2 |
| Beach volleyball | 0 | 2 | 2 |
| Total | 1 | 3 | 4 |

== Beach volleyball ==
Dominica qualified a girls' team based on their performance at the 2018 EVCA Zone U19 Championship.

- Girls' tournament - 1 team of 2 athletes

| Athlete | Event | Group stage | | | | Round of 24 | Round of 16 | Quarterfinal | Semifinal | Final / BM | Rank |
| Athlete | Event | Opposition Score | Opposition Score | Opposition Score | Rank | Opposition Score | Opposition Score | Opposition Score | Opposition Score | Opposition Score | Rank |
|---|---|---|---|---|---|---|---|---|---|---|---|
| Adicia–Lyn | Girls' tournament | Aninha–Thamela (BRA); L 0-2 | Voronina–Bocharova (RUS); L 0-2 | Roskic–Vermette (CAN); L 0-2 | 4 | did not advance | | | | | |

== See also ==
- Dominica at the 2018 Commonwealth Games
