= Swimming at the 2018 Summer Youth Olympics – Boys' 50 metre backstroke =

Boys' 50 metre backstroke at the 2018 Summer Youth Olympics
- Venue: Natatorium
- Dates: 9 October (heats, semifinals); 10 October (final)
- Competitors: 26 from 25 nations
- Winning time: 24.40

Medalists
gold medal	Kliment Kolesnikov	Russia
silver medal	Thomas Ceccon	Italy
bronze medal	Tomoe Zenimoto Hvas	Norway

The boys' 50 metre backstroke event at the 2018 Summer Youth Olympics took place on 9 and 10 October at the Natatorium in Buenos Aires, Argentina.

== Results ==
=== Heats ===
The heats were started on 9 October at 10:38.

Rank	Heat	Lane	Name	Nationality	Time	Notes
1	4	4	Kliment Kolesnikov	Russia	24.74	Q
2	3	4	Wang Guanbin	China	25.93	Q
3	4	5	Tomoe Zenimoto Hvas	Norway	26.14	Q
4	2	4	Thomas Ceccon	Italy	26.24	Q
5	3	1	Anthony Rincón	Colombia	26.27	Q
6	4	2	Lewis Blackburn	Australia	26.29	Q
7	3	3	Sebastian Somerset	Canada	26.30	Q
8	2	1	Roni Kallström	Finland	26.32	Q
9	2	2	Akalanka Peiris	Sri Lanka	26.33	Q, NR
10	3	2	Guillermo Cruz	Mexico	26.35	Q
11	3	6	Chuang Mu-lun	Chinese Taipei	26.38	Q
11	4	3	Abdellah Ardjoune	Algeria	26.38	Q
13	3	5	Kenzo Simons	Netherlands	26.41	Q
14	2	3	Gábor Zombori	Hungary	26.44	Q
15	4	1	Arijaus Pavlidi	Lithuania	26.46	Q
16	2	5	Jack Kirby	Barbados	26.48	Q
17	4	6	Marvin Miglbauer	Austria	26.50	
18	2	6	Srihari Nataraj	India	26.55	
19	2	7	Alanas Tautkus	Lithuania	26.63	
20	4	8	Ethan Harder	United States	26.84	
21	4	7	Hendrik Duvenhage	South Africa	26.97	
22	3	7	Manuel Martos	Spain	27.07	
23	3	8	Brynjólfur Óli Karlsson	Iceland	28.09	
24	1	5	Bede Aitu	Cook Islands	28.90	
25	1	4	Finau 'Ohuafi	Tonga	29.26	
26	1	3	Dennis Mhini	Tanzania	29.79	

=== Semifinals ===
The semifinals were started on 9 October at 19:08.

Rank	Heat	Lane	Name	Nationality	Time	Notes
1	2	4	Kliment Kolesnikov	Russia	24.56	Q
2	2	5	Tomoe Zenimoto Hvas	Norway	25.12	Q
3	2	1	Kenzo Simons	Netherlands	25.81	Q
4	1	5	Thomas Ceccon	Italy	25.98	Q
5	1	4	Wang Guanbin	China	26.05	Q
6	1	1	Gábor Zombori	Hungary	26.10	Q
7	1	3	Lewis Blackburn	Australia	26.17	Q
8	1	2	Guillermo Cruz	Mexico	26.20	Q
9	2	3	Anthony Rincón	Colombia	26.33	
10	2	2	Akalanka Peiris	Sri Lanka	26.36	
11	2	6	Sebastian Somerset	Canada	26.45	
12	2	7	Chuang Mu-lun	Chinese Taipei	26.59	
13	1	7	Abdellah Ardjoune	Algeria	26.64	
14	1	8	Jack Kirby	Barbados	26.77	
15	1	6	Roni Kallström	Finland	26.79	
16	2	8	Arijaus Pavlidi	Lithuania	26.93	

=== Final ===
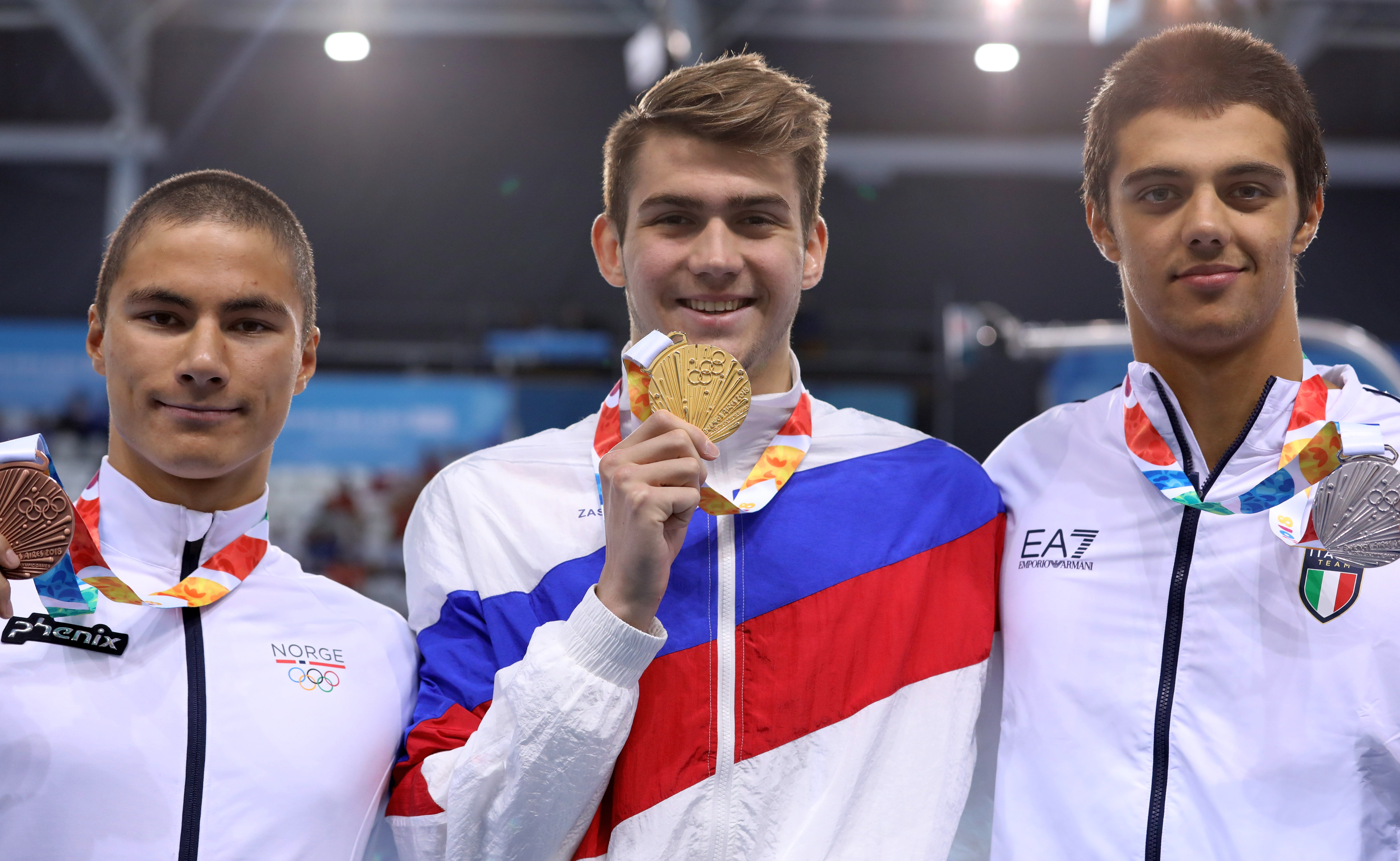
The medailists

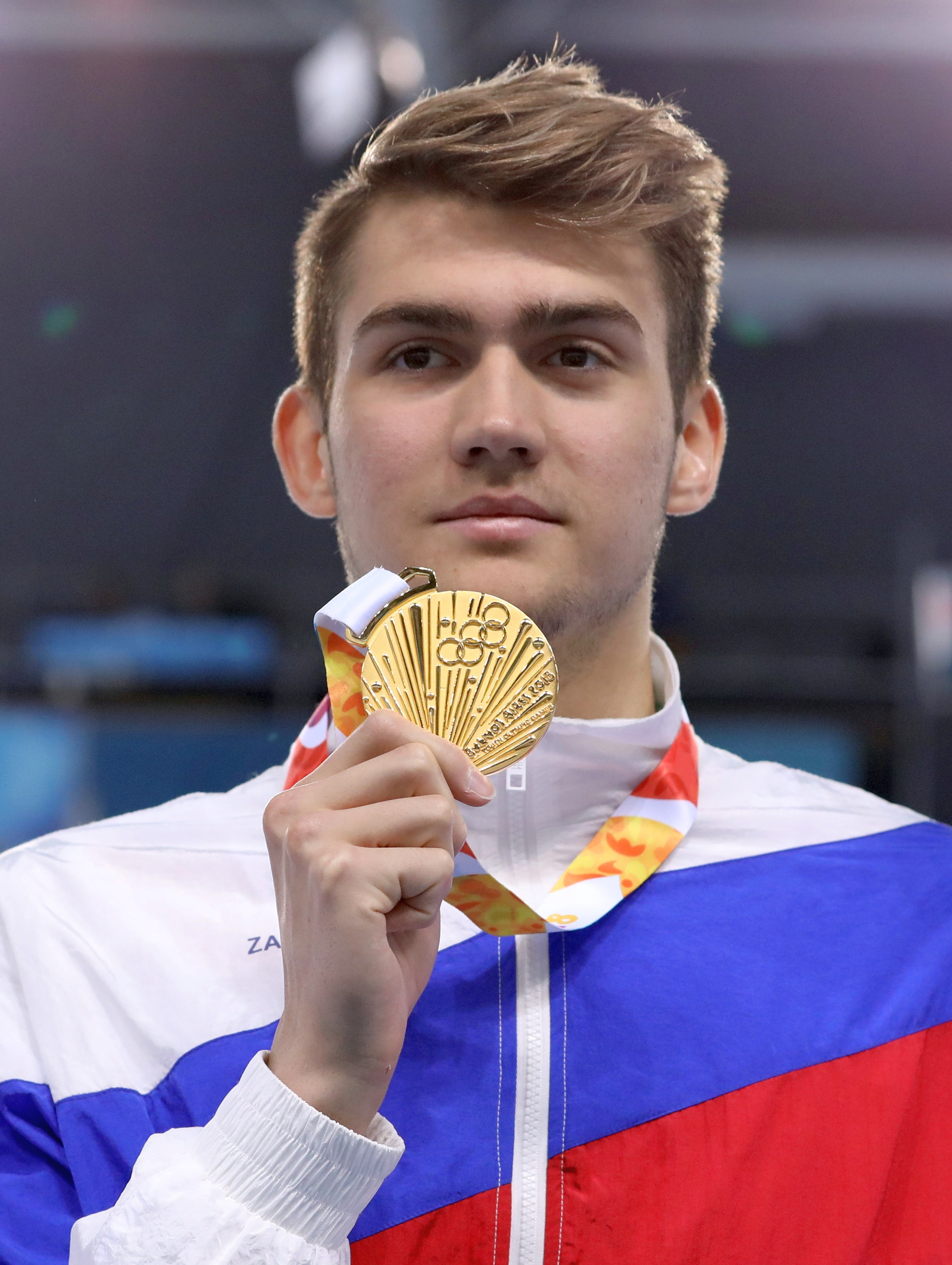
Kliment Kolesnikov, Youth Olympic Games Champion

The final was held on 10 October at 18:34.

Rank	Lane	Name	Nationality	Time	Notes
1st place, gold medalist(s)	4	Kliment Kolesnikov	Russia	24.40	
2nd place, silver medalist(s)	6	Thomas Ceccon	Italy	25.27	
3rd place, bronze medalist(s)	5	Tomoe Zenimoto Hvas	Norway	25.28	
4	2	Wang Guanbin	China	25.83	
5	1	Lewis Blackburn	Australia	25.99	
6	3	Kenzo Simons	Netherlands	26.26	
7	8	Guillermo Cruz	Mexico	26.56	
8	7	Gábor Zombori	Hungary	26.63	
