= Swimming at the 2018 Summer Youth Olympics – Boys' 100 metre breaststroke =

Boys' 100 metre breaststroke at the 2018 Summer Youth Olympics
- Venue: Natatorium
- Dates: 7 October (heats, semifinals); 8 October (final)
- Competitors: 32 from 29 nations
- Winning time: 1:00.59

Medalists
gold medal	Sun Jiajun	China
silver medal	Denis Petrashov	Kyrgyzstan
bronze medal	Taku Taniguchi	Japan

The boys' 100 metre breaststroke event at the 2018 Summer Youth Olympics took place on 7 and 8 October at the Natatorium in Buenos Aires, Argentina.

== Results ==
=== Heats ===
The heats were started on 7 October at 11:00.

Rank	Heat	Lane	Name	Nationality	Time	Notes
1	3	5	Michael Houlie	South Africa	1:01.37	Q
2	4	4	Sun Jiajun	China	1:01.43	Q
3	3	4	Taku Taniguchi	Japan	1:01.68	Q
4	2	5	Yu Hanaguruma	Japan	1:02.22	Q
5	2	4	Vladislav Gerasimenko	Russia	1:02.46	Q
6	4	3	Jan Kałusowski	Poland	1:02.63	Q
7	3	3	Caspar Corbeau	Netherlands	1:02.74	Q
8	4	5	Denis Petrashov	Kyrgyzstan	1:02.82	Q
9	2	7	Phạm Thanh Bảo	Vietnam	1:02.99	Q
10	2	3	Vitor de Souza	Brazil	1:03.18	Q
11	4	7	Sebestyén Böhm	Hungary	1:03.21	Q
12	4	6	Juri Dijkstra	Netherlands	1:03.53	Q
13	4	8	Santiago Saint-Upery	Uruguay	1:03.55	Q
14	3	7	Demirkan Demir	Turkey	1:03.68	Q
15	3	1	Moncef Aymen Balamane	Algeria	1:03.72	Q
16	3	2	André Klippenberg Grindheim	Norway	1:03.80	Q
17	3	6	Alexander Milanovich	Canada	1:03.88	
18	4	1	Jānis Vitauts Siliņš	Latvia	1:04.06	
19	3	8	Maximillian Ang	Singapore	1:04.24	
20	1	4	Aleksey Sidorchuk	Uzbekistan	1:04.31	
21	2	8	Marcus Mok	Hong Kong	1:04.46	
22	4	2	Andrés Puente	Mexico	1:04.69	
23	2	2	Ethan Dang	United States	1:04.72	
24	1	2	Dávid Gajdoš	Slovakia	1:04.87	
25	2	1	Didzis Rudavs	Latvia	1:04.95	
26	1	3	Matija Može	Slovenia	1:04.96	
27	2	6	Izaak Bastian	Bahamas	1:05.21	
28	1	6	Luis Weekes	Barbados	1:06.27	
29	1	5	David Solis	Costa Rica	1:06.32	
30	1	8	Samuele Rossi	Seychelles	1:07.28	
31	1	1	Leonard Kalate	Papua New Guinea	1:07.53	
32	1	7	Simon Greuter	Liechtenstein	1:08.12	

=== Semifinals ===
The semifinals were started on 7 October at 18:38.

Rank	Heat	Lane	Name	Nationality	Time	Notes
1	2	4	Michael Houlie	South Africa	1:00.23	Q
2	1	4	Sun Jiajun	China	1:00.61	Q
3	1	6	Denis Petrashov	Kyrgyzstan	1:01.95	Q
4	1	5	Yu Hanaguruma	Japan	1:01.99	Q
5	2	5	Taku Taniguchi	Japan	1:02.08	Q
6	2	3	Vladislav Gerasimenko	Russia	1:02.15	Q
7	1	3	Jan Kałusowski	Poland	1:02.23	Q
8	2	6	Caspar Corbeau	Netherlands	1:02.29	Q
9	2	2	Phạm Thanh Bảo	Vietnam	1:02.52	
10	1	2	Vitor de Souza	Brazil	1:02.69	
11	1	7	Juri Dijkstra	Netherlands	1:03.10	
12	2	7	Sebestyén Böhm	Hungary	1:03.23	
13	2	8	Moncef Aymen Balamane	Algeria	1:03.35	
14	1	8	André Klippenberg Grindheim	Norway	1:03.65	
15	2	1	Santiago Saint-Upery	Uruguay	1:03.84	
16	1	1	Demirkan Demir	Turkey	1:04.05	

=== Final ===
The final was held on 8 October at 19:02.

Rank	Lane	Name	Nationality	Time	Notes
1st place, gold medalist(s)	5	Sun Jiajun	China	1:00.59	
2nd place, silver medalist(s)	3	Denis Petrashov	Kyrgyzstan	1:01.34	
3rd place, bronze medalist(s)	2	Taku Taniguchi	Japan	1:01.40	
4	6	Yu Hanaguruma	Japan	1:01.62	
5	4	Michael Houlie	South Africa	1:01.70	
6	8	Caspar Corbeau	Netherlands	1:01.81	
7	7	Vladislav Gerasimenko	Russia	1:02.43	
8	1	Jan Kałusowski	Poland	1:02.69	
