= Aruba at the 2018 Summer Youth Olympics =

- IOC code: ARU
- NOC: Aruban Olympic Committee
- Website: https://www.olympicaruba.com/

in Buenos Aires, Argentina 6 – 18 October 2018
- Competitors: 7 in 4 sports
- Medals: Gold 0 Silver 0 Bronze 0 Total 0

Summer Youth Olympics appearances
- 2010; 2014; 2018; 2026

Aruba participated at the 2018 Summer Youth Olympics in Buenos Aires, Argentina from 6 to 18 October 2018.

== Beach volleyball ==
Aruba qualified a boys' and girls' team based on their performance at the 2018 CAZOVA Zone U19 Championship.

- Boys' tournament – 1 team of 2 athletes
- Girls' tournament – 1 team of 2 athletes

Athlete	Event	Group stage				Round of 24	Round of 16	Quarterfinal	Semifinal	Final / BM	Rank
Athlete	Event	Opposition Score	Opposition Score	Opposition Score	Rank	Opposition Score	Opposition Score	Opposition Score	Opposition Score	Opposition Score	Rank
Mali–Kayla	Girls' tournament	Diana–Uri (VEN); L 0–2	Romero–Gutiérrez (MEX); L 0–2	Valentine–Penelope (RWA); W 2–1	3	Aninha–Thamela (BRA); L 0–2	did not advance				
Railbiently–Brian	Boys' tournament	Bintang–Danang (INA); L 0–2	Brewster–Schwengel (USA); L 0–2	Gabo–Osório (VEN); L 0–2	4	did not advance					

== Swimming ==
Girls

Athlete	Event	Heats		Semifinals		Final	
Athlete	Event	Time	Rank	Time	Rank	Time	Rank
Anahi Schreuders	50 metre breaststroke	34.37	31	did not advance			
Anahi Schreuders	100 metre breaststroke	1:15.14	41	did not advance			

== Tennis ==
Singles

Athlete	Event	Round of 32	Round of 16	Quarterfinals	Semifinals	Final / BM	
Athlete	Event	Opposition Score	Opposition Score	Opposition Score	Opposition Score	Opposition Score	Rank
P Sydow	Boys' singles	D Baird (USA); L (3–6, 7^{7}-6^{5}, 3–6)	did not advance				

Doubles

Athletes	Event	Round of 32	Round of 16	Quarterfinals	Semifinals	Final / BM	
Athletes	Event	Opposition Score	Opposition Score	Opposition Score	Opposition Score	Opposition Score	Rank
N Hardt (DOM); P Sydow (ARU)	Boys' doubles	A Dawani (BHR); D Tashbulatov (KAZ); W (6–0, 6–1)	H Gaston (FRA); C Tabur (FRA); L (2–6, 2–6)	did not advance			
A Makatsaria (GEO); P Sydow (ARU)	Mixed doubles	Y Naito (JPN); N Tajima (JPN); L (0–6, 1–6)	did not advance				

== Triathlon ==
Individual

Athlete	Event	Swim (750m)	Trans 1	Bike (20 km)	Trans 2	Run (5 km)	Total Time	Rank
Giannon Lisandro Eights	Boys	10:31	0:35	32:02	0:33	18:53	1:02:34	31

Relay

Athlete	Event	Total Times per Athlete (Swim 250m, Bike 6.6 km, Run 1.8 km)	Total Group Time	Rank
Americas 5 Maryhelen Albright (USA); Giannon Lisandro Eights (ARU); Naomi Espinoza Guablocho (PER); Dominic Pugliese (ISV)	Mixed Relay	22:45 (6); 23:11 (12); 25:15 (10); 24:06 (13)	1:35:17	11
