= Beach volleyball at the 2018 Summer Youth Olympics – Girls' tournament =

Girls' tournament at the III Summer Youth Olympic Games
- Venue: Parque Tres de Febrero
- Date: October 7 – 17
- Competitors: 64 from 32 nations

Medalists
1st place, gold medalist(s)		Maria Voronina; Maria Bocharova	Russia
2nd place, silver medalist(s)		Claudia Scampoli; Nicol Bertozzi	Italy
3rd place, bronze medalist(s)		Emilie Olimstad; Frida Berntsen	Norway

These are the results for the girls' tournament event at the 2018 Summer Youth Olympics.

== Results ==
=== Preliminary round ===
==== Pool A ====
Pos	Team	Pld	W	L	Pts	SW	SL	SR	SPW	SPL	SPR	Qualification
1	Newberry–Sparks (USA)	3	3	0	6	6	0	MAX	126	76	1.658	Round of 16
2	Baumann–Betschart (SUI)	3	2	1	5	4	3	1.333	129	118	1.093	Round of 24
3	Villar–Churín (ARG)	3	1	2	4	3	4	0.750	118	130	0.908	Round of 24
4	Lauren–Tiaan (AUS)	3	0	3	3	0	6	0.000	78	127	0.614	

Date	Time		Score		Set 1	Set 2	Set 3	Total	Report
7 Oct	15:00	Newberry–Sparks (USA)	2–0	Lauren–Tiaan (AUS)	21–9	21–13		42–22	
7 Oct	16:00	Villar–Churín (ARG)	1–2	Baumann–Betschart (SUI)	25–23	17–21	7–15	49–59	
9 Oct	9:00	Newberry–Sparks (USA)	2–0	Baumann–Betschart (SUI)	21–16	21–12		42–28	
9 Oct	16:00	Villar–Churín (ARG)	2–0	Lauren–Tiaan (AUS)	21–9	22–20		43–29	
11 Oct	11:00	Lauren–Tiaan (AUS)	0–2	Baumann–Betschart (SUI)	15–21	12–21		27–42	
11 Oct	16:00	Villar–Churín (ARG)	0–2	Newberry–Sparks (USA)	8–21	18–21		26–42	

==== Pool B ====
Pos	Team	Pld	W	L	Pts	SW	SL	SR	SPW	SPL	SPR	Qualification
1	Voronina–Bocharova (RUS)	3	3	0	6	6	0	MAX	126	69	1.826	Round of 16
2	Aninha–Thamela (BRA)	3	2	1	5	4	2	2.000	113	78	1.449	Round of 24
3	Roskic–Vermette (CAN)	3	1	2	4	2	4	0.500	96	100	0.960	Round of 24
4	Adicia–Lyn (DMA)	3	0	3	3	0	6	0.000	38	126	0.302	

Date	Time		Score		Set 1	Set 2	Set 3	Total	Report
8 Oct	15:00	Aninha–Thamela (BRA)	2–0	Adicia–Lyn (DMA)	21–8	21–4		42–12	
8 Oct	16:00	Voronina–Bocharova (RUS)	2–0	Roskic–Vermette (CAN)	21–15	21–15		42–30	
10 Oct	10:00	Voronina–Bocharova (RUS)	2–0	Adicia–Lyn (DMA)	21–4	21–6		42–10	
10 Oct	11:00	Aninha–Thamela (BRA)	2–0	Roskic–Vermette (CAN)	21–14	21–10		42–24	
12 Oct	11:00	Voronina–Bocharova (RUS)	2–0	Aninha–Thamela (BRA)	21–14	21–15		42—29	
12 Oct	13:00	Adicia–Lyn (DMA)	0–2	Roskic–Vermette (CAN)	8–21	8–21		16–42	

==== Pool C ====
Pos	Team	Pld	W	L	Pts	SW	SL	SR	SPW	SPL	SPR	Qualification
1	Olimstad–Berntsen (NOR)	3	3	0	6	6	1	6.000	137	75	1.827	Round of 16
2	Allcca–Mendoza (PER)	3	2	1	5	5	3	1.667	139	107	1.299	Round of 24
3	Sinaportar–Mucheza (MOZ)	3	1	2	4	3	4	0.750	105	110	0.955	Round of 24
4	Isatu–Iye (SLE)	3	0	3	3	0	6	0.000	37	126	0.294	

Date	Time		Score		Set 1	Set 2	Set 3	Total	Report
8 Oct	13:00	Olimstad–Berntsen (NOR)	2–1	Allcca–Mendoza (PER)	17–21	21–14	15–11	53–46	
8 Oct	14:00	Sinaportar–Mucheza (MOZ)	2–0	Isatu–Iye (SLE)	21–10	21–7		42–17	
10 Oct	9:00	Olimstad–Berntsen (NOR)	2–0	Isatu–Iye (SLE)	21–3	21–1		42–4	
10 Oct	12:00	Sinaportar–Mucheza (MOZ)	1–2	Allcca–Mendoza (PER)	21–15	10–21	7–15	38–51	
12 Oct	9:00	Allcca–Mendoza (PER)	2–0	Isatu–Iye (SLE)	21–10	21–6		42–16	
12 Oct	14:00	Sinaportar–Mucheza (MOZ)	0–2	Olimstad–Berntsen (NOR)	14–21	11–21		25–42	

==== Pool D ====
Pos	Team	Pld	W	L	Pts	SW	SL	SR	SPW	SPL	SPR	Qualification
1	J.J. Zeng–Sh. T. Cao (CHN)	3	3	0	6	6	1	6.000	140	97	1.443	Round of 16
2	Gierczynska–Jundziłł (POL)	3	2	1	5	5	2	2.500	137	94	1.457	Round of 24
3	Juárez–Alvarado (GUA)	3	1	2	4	2	4	0.500	93	105	0.886	Round of 24
4	Niro–Nada (EGY)	3	0	3	3	0	5	0.000	52	126	0.413	

Date	Time		Score		Set 1	Set 2	Set 3	Total	Report
7 Oct	13:00	Niro–Nada (EGY)	0–2	Gierczynska–Jundziłł (POL)	5–21	8–21		13–42	
7 Oct	14:00	Juárez–Alvarado (GUA)	0–2	J.J. Zeng–Sh. T. Cao (CHN)	13–21	13–21		26–42	
9 Oct	10:00	Juárez–Alvarado (GUA)	0–2	Gierczynska–Jundziłł (POL)	11–21	14–21		25–42	
9 Oct	12:00	Niro–Nada (EGY)	0–2	J.J. Zeng–Sh. T. Cao (CHN)	9–21	9–21		18–42	
10 Oct	9:00	Gierczynska–Jundziłł (POL)	1–2	J.J. Zeng–Sh. T. Cao (CHN)	21–19	18–21	14–16	53–56	
10 Oct	10:00	Juárez–Alvarado (GUA)	2–0	Niro–Nada (EGY)	21–11	21–10		42–21	

==== Pool E ====
Pos	Team	Pld	W	L	Pts	SW	SL	SR	SPW	SPL	SPR	Qualification
1	Scampoli–Bertozzi (ITA)	3	3	0	6	6	1	6.000	133	99	1.343	Round of 16
2	Navas–Gonzalez (PUR)	3	2	1	5	4	2	2.000	117	88	1.330	Round of 24
3	Giuli–Romi (PAR)	3	1	2	4	3	4	0.750	116	103	1.126	Round of 24
4	Ravo–Tebeim (VAN)	3	0	3	3	0	6	0.000	50	126	0.397	

Date	Time		Score		Set 1	Set 2	Set 3	Total	Report
7 Oct	11:00	Navas–Gonzalez (PUR)	2–0	Giuli–Romi (PAR)	21–16	21–14		42–30	
7 Oct	12:00	Scampoli–Bertozzi (ITA)	2–0	Ravo–Tebeim (VAN)	21–11	21–11		42–22	
9 Oct	11:00	Navas–Gonzalez (PUR)	2–0	Ravo–Tebeim (VAN)	21–11	21–5		42–16	
9 Oct	15:00	Scampoli–Bertozzi (ITA)	2–1	Giuli–Romi (PAR)	21–14	13–21	15–9	49–44	
10 Oct	13:00	Scampoli–Bertozzi (ITA)	2–0	Navas–Gonzalez (PUR)	21–19	21–14		42–33	
10 Oct	14:00	Giuli–Romi (PAR)	2–0	Ravo–Tebeim (VAN)	21–5	21–7		42–12	

==== Pool F ====
Pos	Team	Pld	W	L	Pts	SW	SL	SR	SPW	SPL	SPR	Qualification
1	Diana–Uri (VEN)	3	3	0	6	6	1	6.000	135	89	1.517	Round of 16
2	Romero–Gutiérrez (MEX)	3	2	1	5	5	2	2.500	130	99	1.313	Round of 24
3	Mali–Kayla (ARU)	3	1	2	4	2	5	0.400	95	133	0.714	Round of 24
4	Valentine–Penelope (RWA)	3	0	3	3	1	6	0.167	99	138	0.717	

Date	Time		Score		Set 1	Set 2	Set 3	Total	Report
8 Oct	11:00	Valentine–Penelope (RWA)	1–2	Mali–Kayla (ARU)	15–21	21–18	13–15	49–54	
8 Oct	12:00	Diana–Uri (VEN)	2–1	Romero–Gutiérrez (MEX)	15–21	21–15	15–10	51–46	
10 Oct	13:00	Diana–Uri (VEN)	2–0	Mali–Kayla (ARU)	21–10	21–12		42–22	
10 Oct	15:00	Valentine–Penelope (RWA)	0–2	Romero–Gutiérrez (MEX)	13–21	16–21		29–42	
12 Oct	15:00	Diana–Uri (VEN)	2–0	Valentine–Penelope (RWA)	21–6	21–15		42–21	
12 Oct	16:00	Mali–Kayla (ARU)	0–2	Romero–Gutiérrez (MEX)	9–21	10–21		19–42	

==== Pool G ====
Pos	Team	Pld	W	L	Pts	SW	SL	SR	SPW	SPL	SPR	Qualification
1	Nicole–Canedo (BOL)	3	3	0	6	6	1	6.000	116	70	1.657	Round of 16
2	van Driel–Schoon (NED)	3	2	1	5	4	3	1.333	107	110	0.973	Round of 24
3	Dickson–Otene (NZL)	3	1	2	4	4	4	1.000	131	132	0.992	Round of 24
4	Dorcas–Kutekenenyi (COD)	3	0	3	3	0	6	0.000	61	126	0.484	

Date	Time		Score		Set 1	Set 2	Set 3	Total	Report
8 Oct	9:00	Nicole–Canedo (BOL)	2–0	van Driel–Schoon (NED)	21–12	21–0		42–12	(INJ)
8 Oct	10:00	Dickson–Otene (NZL)	2–0	Dorcas–Kutekenenyi (COD)	21–12	21–12		42–24	
10 Oct	14:00	Dickson–Otene (NZL)	1–2	van Driel–Schoon (NED)	21–17	16–21	9–15	46–53	
10 Oct	16:00	Nicole–Canedo (BOL)	2–0	Dorcas–Kutekenenyi (COD)	21–4	21–11		42–15	
12 Oct	10:00	Dickson–Otene (NZL)	1–2	Nicole–Canedo (BOL)	21–19	15–21	7–15	43–55	
12 Oct	12:00	van Driel–Schoon (NED)	2–0	Dorcas–Kutekenenyi (COD)	21–9	21–13		42–22	

==== Pool H ====
Pos	Team	Pld	W	L	Pts	SW	SL	SR	SPW	SPL	SPR	Qualification
1	Álvarez M.–Moreno (ESP)	3	3	0	6	6	0	MAX	126	69	1.826	Round of 16
2	Thatsarida–Pawarun (THA)	3	2	1	5	4	2	2.000	116	92	1.261	Round of 24
3	Vargas–Corbacho (URU)	3	1	2	4	2	5	0.400	95	136	0.699	Round of 24
4	Ariana–Karelys (ECU)	3	0	3	3	1	6	0.167	96	136	0.706	

Date	Time		Score		Set 1	Set 2	Set 3	Total	Report
7 Oct	9:00	Álvarez M.–Moreno (ESP)	2–0	Ariana–Karelys (ECU)	21–11	21–8		42–19	
7 Oct	10:00	Thatsarida–Pawarun (THA)	2–0	Vargas–Corbacho (URU)	21–11	21–14		42–25	
9 Oct	13:00	Álvarez M.–Moreno (ESP)	2–0	Vargas–Corbacho (URU)	21–8	21–10		42–18	
9 Oct	14:00	Thatsarida–Pawarun (THA)	2–0	Ariana–Karelys (ECU)	21–11	21–14		42–25	
10 Oct	12:00	Ariana–Karelys (ECU)	1–2	Vargas–Corbacho (URU)	21–15	17–21	14–16	52–52	
10 Oct	15:00	Thatsarida–Pawarun (THA)	0–2	Álvarez M.–Moreno (ESP)	14–21	18–21		32–42	

=== Knockout stage ===
==== Round of 24 ====
Date	Time		Score		Set 1	Set 2	Set 3	Total	Report
13 Oct	9:00	Romero–Gutiérrez (MEX)	2–0	Vargas–Corbacho (URU)	23–21	21–17		44–38	
13 Oct	10:00	Sinaportar–Mucheza (MOZ)	0–2	Navas–Gonzalez (PUR)	15–21	14–21		29–42	
13 Oct	11:00	Thatsarida–Pawarun (THA)	2–0	Dickson–Otene (NZL)	25–23	21–13		46–36	
13 Oct	12:00	Gierczynska–Jundziłł (POL)	0–2	Villar–Churín (ARG)	19–21	16–21		35–42	
13 Oct	13:00	van Driel–Schoon (NED)	2–0	Giuli–Romi (PAR)	21–10	21–14		42–24	
13 Oct	14:00	Juárez–Alvarado (GUA)	0–2	Baumann–Betschart (SUI)	8–21	11–21		19–42	
13 Oct	15:00	Roskic–Vermette (CAN)	1–2	Allcca–Mendoza (PER)	19–21	21–15	12–15	52–51	
13 Oct	16:00	Mali–Kayla (ARU)	0–2	Aninha–Thamela (BRA)	7–21	2–21		9–42	

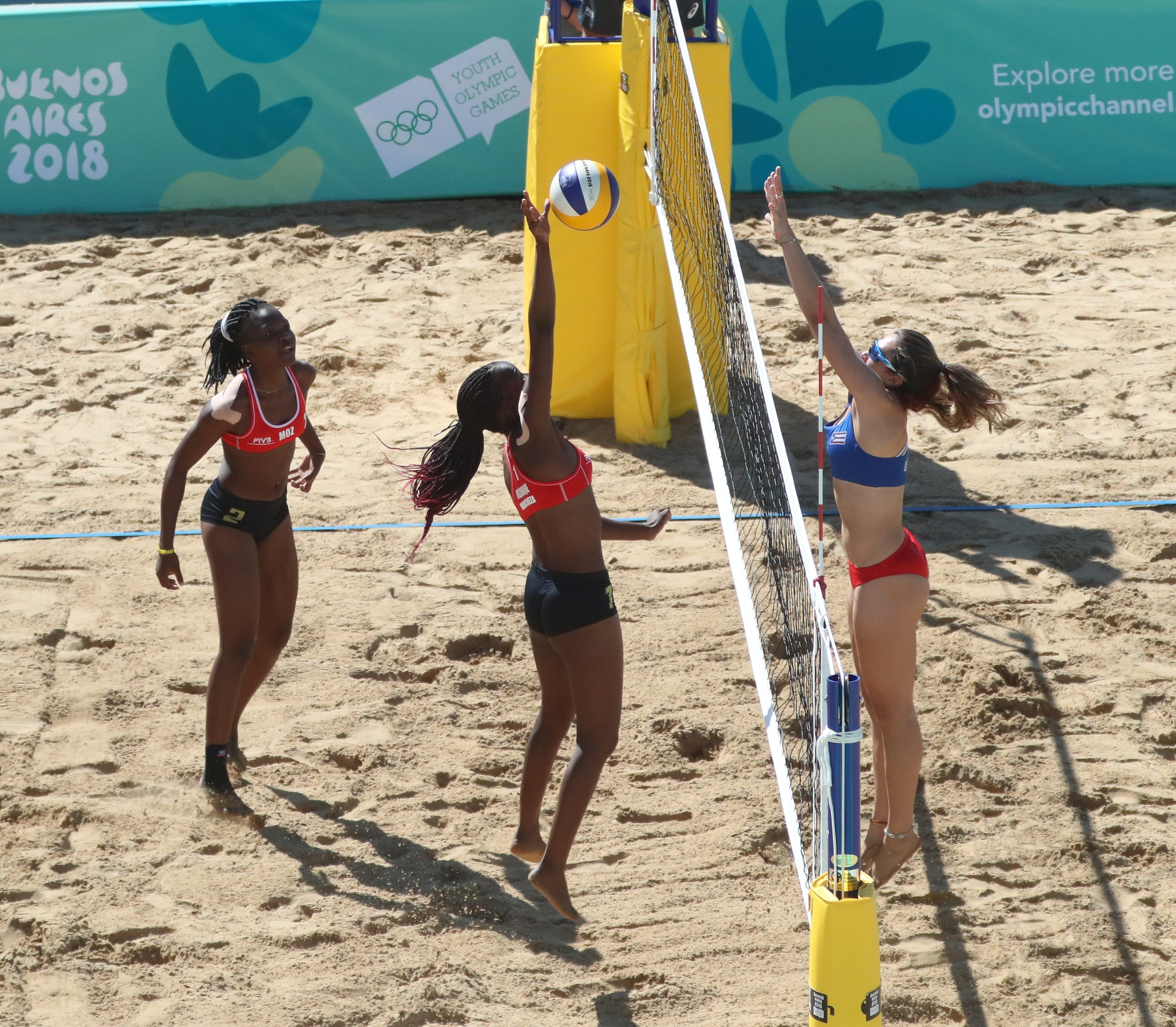
Mozambique vs. Puerto Rico in the Round of 24

==== Round of 16 ====
Date	Time		Score		Set 1	Set 2	Set 3	Total	Report
14 Oct	9:00	Olimstad–Berntsen (NOR)	2–0	Baumann–Betschart (SUI)	21–16	21–15		42–31	
14 Oct	10:00	Scampoli–Bertozzi (ITA)	2–1	Aninha–Thamela (BRA)	13–21	21–18	17–15	51–54	
14 Oct	11:00	van Driel–Schoon (NED)	1–2	Voronina–Bocharova (RUS)	21–15	12–21	10–15	43–51	
14 Oct	12:00	Villar–Churín (ARG)	0–2	Álvarez M.–Moreno (ESP)	18–21	19–21		37–42	
14 Oct	13:00	Newberry–Sparks (USA)	2–0	Allcca–Mendoza (PER)	21–19	21–12		42–31	
14 Oct	14:00	Romero–Gutiérrez (MEX)	0–2	J.J. Zeng–Sh. T. Cao (CHN)	15–21	16–21		31–42	
14 Oct	15:00	Thatsarida–Pawarun (THA)	2–1	Diana–Uri (VEN)	21–18	22–24	15–11	58–53	
14 Oct	16:00	Nicole–Canedo (BOL)	0–2	Navas–Gonzalez (PUR)	18–21	18–21		36–42	

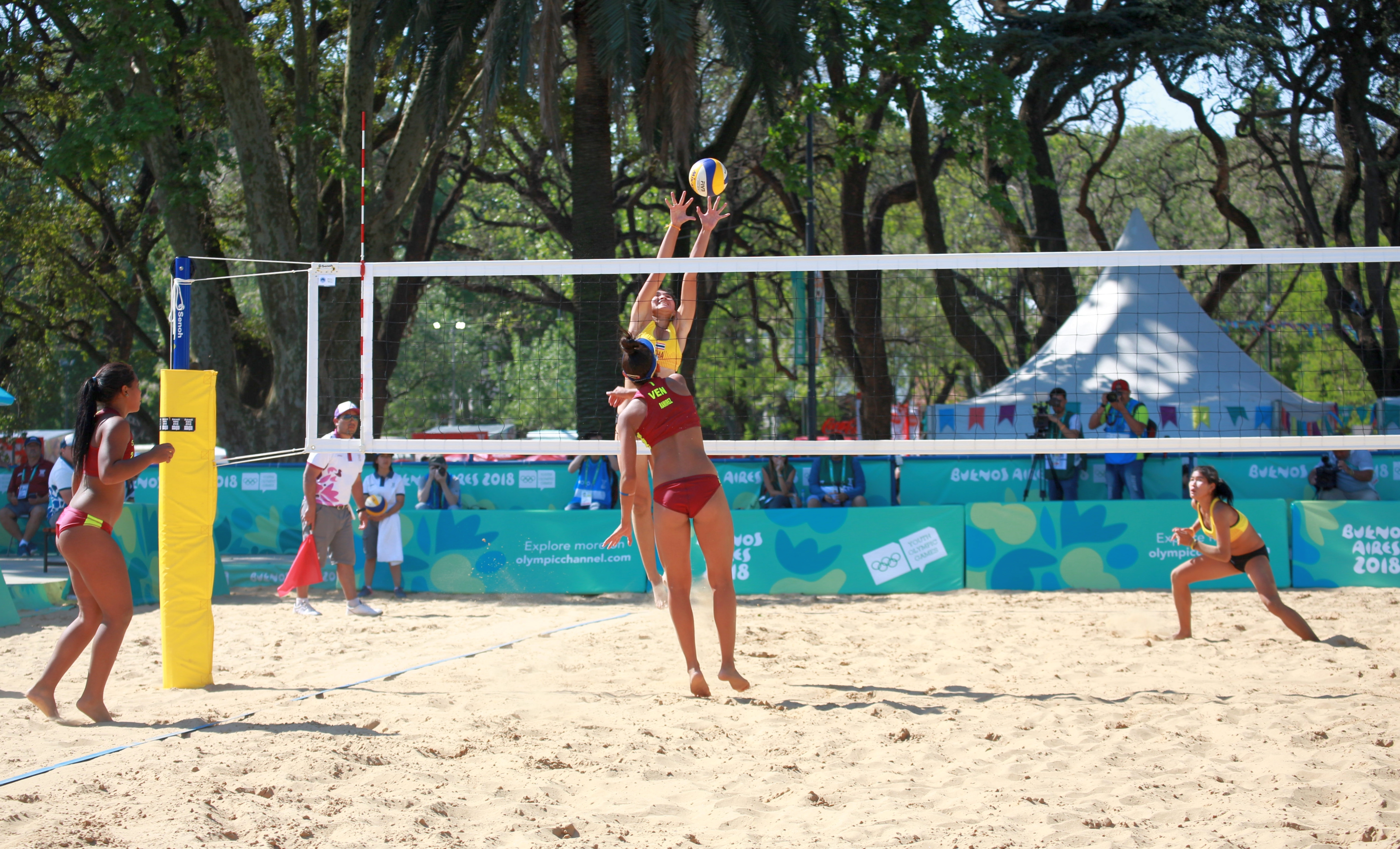
Thailand vs. Venezuela in the Round of 16

==== Quarterfinals ====
Date	Time		Score		Set 1	Set 2	Set 3	Total	Report
15 Oct	11:00	Olimstad–Berntsen (NOR)	2–0	Thatsarida–Pawarun (THA)	22–20	21–16		43–36	
15 Oct	12:00	Scampoli–Bertozzi (ITA)	2–0	J.J. Zeng–Sh. T. Cao (CHN)	21–16	21–9		42–25	
15 Oct	13:00	Navas–Gonzalez (PUR)	0–2	Voronina–Bocharova (RUS)	12–21	10–21		22–42	
15 Oct	14:00	Newberry–Sparks (USA)	2–1	Álvarez M.–Moreno (ESP)	21–19	17–21	15–9	53–49	

==== Semifinals ====
Date	Time		Score		Set 1	Set 2	Set 3	Total	Report
16 Oct	15:00	Newberry–Sparks (USA)	0– 2	Scampoli–Bertozzi (ITA)	16–21	19–21		35–42	
16 Oct	16:00	Olimstad–Berntsen (NOR)	0–2	Voronina–Bocharova (RUS)	16–21	11–21		27–42	

==== Third place game ====
Date	Time		Score		Set 1	Set 2	Set 3	Total	Report
17 Oct	10:00	Newberry–Sparks (USA)	1–2	Olimstad–Berntsen (NOR)	21–18	13–21	9–15	43–54	

==== Final ====
Date	Time		Score		Set 1	Set 2	Set 3	Total	Report
17 Oct	11:30	Scampoli–Bertozzi (ITA)	0–2	Voronina–Bocharova (RUS)	19–21	19–21		38–42	
