= Rwanda at the 2018 Summer Youth Olympics =

- IOC code: RWA
- NOC: Comité National Olympique et Sportif du Rwanda

in Buenos Aires, Argentina 6 – 18 October 2018
- Competitors: 3 in 2 sports
- Medals: Gold 0 Silver 0 Bronze 0 Total 0

Summer Youth Olympics appearances
- 2010; 2014; 2018

Rwanda participated at the 2018 Summer Youth Olympics in Buenos Aires, Argentina from 6 October to 18 October 2018.

== Competitors ==
Sport	Boy	Girl	Total
Athletics	1	0	1
Beach volleyball	0	2	2
Total	1	2	3

== Athletics ==
Athlete	Event	Stage 1		Stage 2		Total	
Athlete	Event	Time	Rank	Time	Rank	Time	Rank
Aime Phraditte Bakunzi	3000 m	8:26.70	9	13:01	15	24	12

== Beach volleyball ==
Athlete	Event	Group stage				Round of 24	Round of 16	Quarterfinal	Semifinal	Final / BM	Rank
Athlete	Event	Opposition Score	Opposition Score	Opposition Score	Rank	Opposition Score	Opposition Score	Opposition Score	Opposition Score	Opposition Score	Rank
Valentine; Penelope	Girls' tournament	Diana–Uri (VEN); L 0-2	Romero–Gutiérrez (MEX); L 0-2	Mali–Kayla (ARU); L 1-2	4	did not advance					
