= Bhutan at the 2018 Summer Youth Olympics =

- IOC code: BHU
- NOC: Bhutan Olympic Committee
- Website: www.bhutanolympiccommittee.org

in Buenos Aires, Argentina 6 – 18 October 2018
- Competitors: 3 in 3 sports
- Medals: Gold 0 Silver 0 Bronze 0 Total 0

Summer Youth Olympics appearances
- 2010; 2014; 2018

Bhutan participated at the 2018 Summer Youth Olympics in Buenos Aires, Argentina from 6 October to 18 October 2018.

== Athletics ==
Bhutan qualified 1 athlete.

Athlete	Event	Stage 1		Stage 2		Total	
Athlete	Event	Time	Rank	Time	Rank	Time	Rank
Kinley Tshering	1500 m	4:15.15	21	13:10	16	37	18

== Judo ==
Bhutan qualified 1 athlete.

Athlete	Event	Round of 16	Quarterfinals	Semifinals	Repechage			Final / BM	
Athlete	Event	Round of 16	Quarterfinals	Semifinals	Round of 8	Quarterfinals	Semifinals	Final / BM	
Athlete	Event	Opposition Result	Opposition Result	Opposition Result	Opposition Result	Opposition Result	Opposition Result	Opposition Result	Rank
Yangchen Wangmo	Girls' 44 kg	Devi (IND); L 0–10	Did not advance		Bye	Karimova (AZE); L 0–10	Did not advance		

Team

Athletes	Event	Round of 16	Quarterfinals	Semifinals	Final	
Athletes	Event	Opposition Result	Opposition Result	Opposition Result	Opposition Result	Rank
Team London; Yangchen Wangmo (BHU); Daniel Leutgeb (AUT); Noemi Huayhuameza Orneta (PER); Joao Santos (BRA); Rachel Krapman (CAN); Ahmed Rebahi (ALG); Edith Ortiz (ECU); Bekarys Saduakas (KAZ)	Mixed team	Bye	Team Moscow (MIX); W 4–3	Team Beijing (MIX); L 0–7	Did not advance	3rd place, bronze medalist(s)

== Taekwondo ==
Bhutan qualified 1 athlete.

Athlete	Event	Round of 16	Quarterfinals	Semifinals	Final	
Athlete	Event	Opposition Result	Opposition Result	Opposition Result	Opposition Result	Rank
Yangchen Tshering	Girls' 49 kg	Hồ Thị Kim Ngân (VIE); L 0-22	Did not advance			
