= Bolivia at the 2018 Summer Youth Olympics =

- IOC code: BOL
- NOC: Bolivian Olympic Committee
- Website: https://www.comiteolimpicoboliviano.org.bo/

in Buenos Aires, Argentina 6 – 18 October 2018
- Competitors: 18 in 6 sports
- Medals: Gold 0 Silver 0 Bronze 0 Total 0

Summer Youth Olympics appearances
- 2010; 2014; 2018

Bolivia participated at the 2018 Summer Youth Olympics in Buenos Aires, Argentina from 6 October to 18 October 2018.

== Athletics ==
Athlete	Event	Stage 1		Stage 2		Total	
Athlete	Event	Result	Rank	Result	Rank	Total	Rank
Sthephanie Chávez	Girls' 5000 metre walk	24:41.80	9	26:39.09	14	51:20.89	11

== Beach volleyball ==
Bolivia qualified a boys' and girls' team based on their overall ranking from the South American Youth Tour.

- Boys' tournament - 1 team of 2 athletes
- Girls' tournament - 1 team of 2 athletes

Athletes	Event	Preliminary round		Round of 24	Round of 16	Quarterfinals	Semifinals	Final / BM	
Athletes	Event	Opposition Score	Rank	Opposition Score	Opposition Score	Opposition Score	Opposition Score	Opposition Score	Rank
Gus–Carlos	Boys' tournament	de Groot–Immers (NED); L 0–2; João Pedro–Gabriel (BRA); L 1–2; James–Mark (AUS); L 0–2	4	did not advance					
Nicole–Canedo	Girls' tournament	van Driel–Schoon (NED); W 2–0; Dickson–Otene (NZL); W 2–1; Dorcas–Kutekenenyi (COD); W 2–0	1	Bye	Navas–Gonzalez (PUR); L 0–2	did not advance			

== Cycling ==
Bolivia qualified a mixed BMX racing team based on its ranking in the Youth Olympic Games BMX Junior Nation Rankings.

- Mixed BMX racing team - 1 team of 2 athletes

BMX racing

Athlete	Event	Semifinal		Final			Total points	Rank
Athlete	Event	Points	Rank	Result	Rank	Points	Total points	Rank
Regina Medina	Mixed BMX racing	22	7	did not advance			6	16
Joaquin Orellana	Mixed BMX racing	22	7	did not advance			6	16

== Equestrian ==
Bolivia qualified a rider based on its ranking in the FEI World Jumping Challenge Rankings.

- Individual Jumping - 1 athlete

Athlete	Horse	Event	Round 1		Round 2			Total		Jump-Off		Rank
Athlete	Horse	Event	Penalties	Rank	Penalties	Total	Rank	Penalties	Rank	Penalties	Time	Rank
Gonzalo Bedoya	Ankara I	Individual Jumping	4	2	4	4	19	8	19	did not advance		19
South America; Philip Mattos Botelho (BRA); Bernardo Lander (VEN); Gonzalo Bedoya (BOL); Agostina Llano Zuccolillo (PAR); Richard Kierkegaard (ARG)	Denise Z Roi Quake Z Ankara I Red Sugar Z Legolas I	Team Jumping	12 # 4; 4 # 0; 0	4	0; 4 # 0; 0; 0	0	4	did not advance				4

== Futsal ==
Summary

Team	Event	Group Stage					Semifinal	Final / BM	
Team	Event	Opposition score	Opposition score	Opposition score	Opposition score	Rank	Opposition score	Opposition score	Rank
Bolivia	Girls' tournament	Spain; L 2–9	Thailand; W 6–4	Trinidad and Tobago; W 5–2	Tonga; W 7–2	2	Portugal; L 2–16	Spain; L 0–11	4

Group C

Pos	Team	Pld	W	D	L	GF	GA	GD	Pts	Qualification
1	Spain	4	4	0	0	39	5	+34	12	Semi-finals
2	Bolivia	4	3	0	1	20	17	+3	9	Semi-finals
3	Thailand	4	2	0	2	29	13	+16	6	
4	Trinidad and Tobago	4	1	0	3	10	40	−30	3	
5	Tonga	4	0	0	4	8	31	−23	0	

Source: FIFA IOC
7 October 2018
14:00

Spain	9–2	Bolivia
de las Heras 5', 12', 24', 25'; Martínez 10', 37'; Gulli 20'; Agulla 22'; Pérez 22'	Report (FIFA); Report (IOC)	Gálvez 25', 34'

Tecnópolis
Attendance: 2,400
Referee: Hiroyuki Kobayashi (Japan)
8 October 2018
16:00

Bolivia	7–2	Tonga
Pacheco 2'; Gálvez 11', 16', 18', 30'; Montecinos 23', 24'	Report (FIFA); Report (IOC) Category:Futsal at the 2018 Summer Youth Olympics – Girls First Round – BOL-TGA on Wikimedia Commons	Lutu 3'; Akolo 32'

Tecnópolis
Attendance: 710
Referee: Irina Velikanova (Russia)
10 October 2018
16:00

Bolivia	6–4	Thailand
Álvarez 8'; Gálvez 18', 22', 39'; Mendiola 20'; Fernández 25'	Report (FIFA); Report (IOC)	Yuphawadi 18', 19', 21'; Paerploy 33'

Tecnópolis
Attendance: 4,690
Referee: Roberto Sánchez (Cuba)
12 October 2018
16:00

Trinidad and Tobago	2–5	Bolivia
Seleme 16' (o.g.); Mejias 21'	Report (FIFA); Report (IOC)	Gálvez 4', 18', 38', 39'; Álvarez 35'

Tecnópolis
Attendance: 2,300
Referee: Gelareh Nazemi (Iran)

Semi-finals

15 October 2018
14:00

Portugal	16–2	Bolivia
Fifó 4', 8', 33', 37', 39', 39'; Carol 13', 35'; Pereira 16', 16'; Leninha 17'; Sanheiro 22', 38'; Martinha 28', 29', 33'	Report (FIFA); Report (IOC)	Gálvez 2'; Álvarez 28'

Tecnópolis
Attendance: 2,700
Referee: Roberto Sánchez (Cuba)

Finals

17 October 2018
15:30

Bolivia	0–11	Spain
	Report (FIFA); Report IOC) Category:Futsal at the 2018 Summer Youth Olympics – Girls Bronze medal match on Wikimedia Commons	de las Heras 1'; Pérez 2', 3'; Miranda 12', 14', 24'; Gulli 17'; Martínez 25', 34', 35'; López-Pardo 34'

Tecnópolis
Attendance: 1,700
Referee: Valeria Palma (Chile)

== Gymnastics ==
=== Rhythmic ===
Bolivia qualified one gymnast based on its performance at the 2018 American Junior Championship.

- Girls' rhythmic individual all-around - 1 quota
