= Brazil at the 2018 Summer Youth Olympics =

- IOC code: BRA
- NOC: Brazilian Olympic Committee
- Website: https://www.cob.org.br/

in Buenos Aires, Argentina 6 – 18 October 2018
- Competitors: 79 in 24 sports
- Flag bearer: Luiz Gabriel Oliveira
- Medals Ranked 28th: Gold 2 Silver 4 Bronze 7 Total 13

Summer Youth Olympics appearances (overview)
- 2010; 2014; 2018; 2026

Brazil participated at the 2018 Summer Youth Olympics in Buenos Aires, Argentina from 6 October to 18 October 2018. The Brazilian Olympic Committee selected a team of 79 athletes in 24 sports.

== Medalists ==
Medals awarded to participants of mixed-NOC (combined) teams are represented in italics. These medals are not counted towards the individual NOC medal tally.

Medal	Name	Sport	Event	Date
Gold	Keno Machado	Boxing	Boys' 75 kg	17 Oct
Gold	Boys' Futsal Team: Breno Rosa; Caio Valle; Françoar Rodrigues; Guilherme Sanches; João Victor Sena; Mateus Barbosa da Silva; Matheus Batista; Wesley de França; Vitor Henrique da Silva; Yuri Gavião	Futsal	Boys' tournament	18 Oct
Silver	André de Souza; Lucas Peixoto; Ana Vieira; Rafaela Raurich	Swimming	Mixed 4 × 100 m Freestyle Relay	7 Oct
Silver	André de Souza; Lucas Peixoto; Murilo Sartori; Vitor de Souza	Swimming	Boys' 4 × 100 m Freestyle Relay	9 Oct
Silver	Rafaela Raurich; Ana Vieira; Maria Pessanha; Fernanda de Goeij	Swimming	Girls' 4 × 100 m freestyle relay	11 Oct
Silver	Diogo Soares	Gymnastics	Boys' horizontal bar	15 Oct
Bronze	Eduarda Rosa	Judo	Girls' −78kg	9 Oct
Bronze	Sandy Macedo	Taekwondo	Girls' −55kg	9 Oct
Bronze	João dos Santos	Judo	Mixed Team	10 Oct
Bronze	Diogo Soares	Gymnastics	Boys' artistic individual all-around	11 Oct
Bronze	Gilbert Klier	Tennis	Boys' singles	12 Oct
Bronze	Jaqueline Lima	Badminton	Mixed Team	12 Oct
Bronze	Lucas Vilar	Athletics	Boys' 200 metres	16 Oct
Bronze	Letícia Lima	Athletics	Girls' 200 metres	16 Oct
Bronze	Luiz Gabriel Oliveira	Boxing	Boys' 52 kg	17 Oct

== Archery ==
Brazil qualified one archer based on its performance at the 2017 World Archery Youth Championships. Brazil later qualified a female archer based on its performance at the American Continental Qualification Tournament.

Individual

Athlete	Event	Ranking round		Round of 32	Round of 16	Quarterfinals	Semifinals	Final / BM	Rank
Athlete	Event	Score	Seed	Opposition Score	Opposition Score	Opposition Score	Opposition Score	Opposition Score	Rank
Mateus de Carvalho Almeida	Boys' Individual	662	18	Cowles (USA); L 0–6	Did not advance				17
Ana Luiza Sliachticas Caetano	Girls' Individual	625	25	Kharitonova (RUS); L 4–6	Did not advance				17

Team

Athletes	Event	Ranking round		Round of 32	Round of 16	Quarterfinals	Semifinals	Final / BM	Rank
Athletes	Event	Score	Seed	Opposition Score	Opposition Score	Opposition Score	Opposition Score	Opposition Score	Rank
Mateus de Carvalho Almeida (BRA); Stefany Jerez (DOM)	Mixed team	1301	9	Satır (TUR); Akash (IND); L 3–5	Did not advance				17
Ana Luiza Sliachticas Caetano (BRA); Senna Roos (BEL)	Mixed team	1302	6	Walter (SAM); Feng (CHN); W 6–2	Touraine-Helias (FRA); Solera (ESP); L 2–6	Did not advance			9

== Athletics ==
- Boys' 100 m – Lucas Rodrigues da Silva
- Boys' 200 m – Lucas Vilar
- Boys' 400 m – Douglas Mendes
- Boys' 800 m – Pedro Tombolim de Souza
- Boys' 1500 m – Lucas Pinho Leite
- Boys' 110 m hurdles – Marcos Paulo Ferreira
- Boys' 400 m hurdles – Caio Teixeira
- Boys' 10 km walk – Bruno Lorenzetti Nascimento
- Boys' long jump – Adrian Vieira
- Boys' high jump – Elton Petronilho
- Boys' javelin throw – Guilherme Soares
- Boys' discus throw – Vitor Motin
- Girls' 100 m – Vitória Jardim
- Girls' 200 m – Letícia Lima
- Girls' 400 m – Erica Cavalheiro
- Girls' 400 m hurdles – Jéssica Moreira
- Girls' 2000 m steeplechase – Letícia Belo
- Girls' long jump – Lissandra Campos
- Girls' triple jump – Nerisnélia Sousa
- Girls' shot put – Rafaela de Sousa
- Girls' javelin throw – Bruna de Jesus

== Badminton ==
Brazil qualified two players based on the Badminton Junior World Rankings.

Singles

Athlete	Event	Group stage				Quarterfinal	Semifinal	Final / BM	Rank
Athlete	Event	Opposition Score	Opposition Score	Opposition Score	Rank	Opposition Score	Opposition Score	Opposition Score	Rank
Fabrício Farias	Boys' Singles	Bosniuk (UKR); L 0–2	Mostafa Kamel (EGY); W 2–0	Sen (IND); L 0–2	3	Did not advance			9
Jaqueline Lima	Girls' Singles	Linders (NED); W 2–0	Fung (AUS); W 2–1	Huang (TPE); L 0–2	2	Did not advance			9

Team

Athlete	Event	Group stage				Quarterfinal	Semifinal	Final / BM	Rank
Athlete	Event	Opposition Score	Opposition Score	Opposition Score	Rank	Opposition Score	Opposition Score	Opposition Score	Rank
Team Epsilon; Fabricio Farias (BRA); Chen Shiau-cheng (TPE); Nguyễn Hải Đăng (VIE); Tomas Toledano (ESP); Goh Jin Wei (MAS); Vlada Gînga (MDA); Aminat Oluwafunke Ilori (NGR); Nazlıcan İnci (TUR)	Mixed Teams	Alpha (MIX); L (98–110)	Zeta (MIX); L (89–110)	Delta (MIX); W (110–108)	4Q	Omega (MIX); L (102–110)	Did not advance		5
Team Theta; Jaqueline Lima (BRA); Julien Carraggi (BEL); Mohamed Mostafa Kamel (EGY); Kodai Naraoka (JPN); Lukas Resch (GER); Zecily Fung (AUS); Hirari Mizui (JPN); Tereza Švábíková (CZE)	Mixed Teams	Sigma (MIX); L (100–110)	Omega (MIX); L (100–110)	Gamma (MIX); L (107–110)	4Q	Delta (MIX); W (110–93)	Alpha (MIX); L (90–110)	Zeta (MIX); W (110–107)	3rd place, bronze medalist(s)

== Basketball ==
Brazil qualified a boys' team based on the U18 3x3 National Federation Ranking.

- Boys' tournament – 1 team of 4 athletes

Boys' tournament

Event	Group stage					Quarterfinal	Semifinal	Final / BM	
Event	Opposition Score	Opposition Score	Opposition Score	Opposition Score	Rank	Opposition Score	Opposition Score	Opposition Score	Rank
Boys' tournament	New Zealand; W 20–17	Ukraine; L 15–20	Venezuela; W 21–9	Andorra; L 15–8	2	Belgium; L 10–21	Did not advance		6

Boys' dunk contest

Athlete	Event	Qualification		Semifinal		Final	
Athlete	Event	Points	Rank	Points	Rank	Points	Rank
Aieser Pereira	Dunk contest	45	6	Did not advance			

== Beach volleyball ==
Brazil qualified a girls' team based on their overall ranking from the South American Youth Tour.

- Boys' tournament – Gabriel Zuliani and João Pedro Camargo de Barros Moreira
- Girls' tournament – Ana Carolina dos Santos and Thamela Galil

Athletes	Event	Preliminary round		Round of 24	Round of 16	Quarterfinals	Semifinals	Final / BM	
Athletes	Event	Opposition Score	Rank	Opposition Score	Opposition Score	Opposition Score	Opposition Score	Opposition Score	Rank
João Pedro; Gabriel Zuliani	Boys' tournament	Gus–Carlos (BOL); W 2-1 de Groot–Immers (NED); L 0-2; James–Mark (AUS); L 1-2	3	Brewster–Schwengel (USA); L 0-2	Did not advance				
Aninha; Thamela	Girls' tournament	Voronina–Bocharova (RUS); L 0-2; Roskic–Vermette (CAN); W 2-0; Adicia–Lyn (DMA); W 2-0	2	Mali–Kayla (ARU); W 2-0	Scampoli–Bertozzi (ITA); L 1-2	Did not advance			

== Boxing ==
- Boys' team – 3 athletes

Athlete	Event	Preliminary R1	Preliminary R2	Semifinals	Final / RM	Rank
Athlete	Event	Opposition Result	Opposition Result	Opposition Result	Opposition Result	Rank
Luiz Gabriel Oliveira	-52 kg	Bye	Naeemi (AFG); W WO	Sukthet (THA); L 1–4	Clancy (IRL); W 5-0	3rd place, bronze medalist(s)
Kauê Belini	-69 kg	Bye	Rakhmonov (UZB); L 1–4	Did not advance	Tauta (ASA); NC	6
Keno Machado	-75 kg	Bye	Millas (ITA); W WO	Jongjohor (THA); W 5–0	Douibi (ALG); W 5–0	1st place, gold medalist(s)

== Canoeing ==
Brazil qualified one boat based on its performance at the 2018 World Qualification Event.

- Boys' C1 – Diego Nascimento

Athlete	Event	Qualification		Repechage		Quarterfinals	Semifinals	Final / BM	Rank
Athlete	Event	Time	Rank	Time	Rank	Opposition Result	Opposition Result	Opposition Result	Rank
Diego Nascimento	Boys' C1 sprint	1:57.35	6	1:56.15	4	Palla (HUN); L 1:55.92	Did not advance		
Diego Nascimento	Boys' C1 slalom	DSQ		Did not advance					

== Cycling ==
Brazil qualified a girls' combined team based on its ranking in the Youth Olympic Games Junior Nation Rankings. They also qualified a mixed BMX racing team based on its ranking in the Youth Olympic Games BMX Junior Nation Rankings and two athletes in BMX freestyle based on its performance at the 2018 Urban Cycling World Championship.

- Girls' combined team – Amanda Kunkel and Bruna Saalfeld Elias
- Mixed BMX racing team – Vitor Marotta and Eduarda Bordignon
- Mixed BMX freestyle – Wesley Velho and Maitê Barreto

== Diving ==
- Girls' events – Anna Lúcia dos Santos

Athlete	Event	Preliminary		Final	
Athlete	Event	Points	Rank	Points	Rank
Anna dos Santos	Girls' 3 m springboard	353.45	14	Did not advance	
Anna dos Santos	Boys' 10 m platform	272.00	10	250.20	11
Anna dos Santos (BRA); Dylan Vork (NED)	Mixed team	—N/a		241.35	14

== Equestrian ==
Brazil qualified a rider based on its ranking in the FEI World Jumping Challenge Rankings.

- Individual Jumping – Philip Mattos Botelho

Athlete	Horse	Event	Round 1		Round 2			Total		Jump-Off		Rank
Athlete	Horse	Event	Penalties	Rank	Penalties	Total	Rank	Penalties	Rank	Penalties	Time	Rank
Philip Mattos Botelho	Denise Z	Individual Jumping	8	20	0	8	16	8	16	Did not advance		16
South America; Philip Mattos Botelho (BRA); Bernardo Lander (VEN); Gonzalo Bedoya (BOL); Agostina Llano Zuccolillo (PAR); Richard Kierkegaard (ARG)	Denise Z Roi Quake Z Ankara I Red Sugar Z Legolas I	Team Jumping	12 # 4; 4 # 0; 0	4	0; 4 # 0; 0; 0	0	4	Did not advance				4

== Futsal ==
Brazil qualified a boy team at the South American U-18 Championship.

=== Boys' tournament ===
Roster

  - Breno Rosa
  - Caio Valle
  - Françoar Rodrigues
  - Guilherme Sanches
  - João Victor Sena
  - Mateus Barbosa da Silva
  - Matheus Batista
  - Wesley de França
  - Vitor Henrique da Silva
  - Yuri Gavião

Group stage

Pos	Team	Pld	W	D	L	GF	GA	GD	Pts	Qualification
1	Brazil	4	4	0	0	25	4	+21	12	Semi-finals
2	Russia	4	3	0	1	19	12	+7	9	Semi-finals
3	Iran	4	2	0	2	19	11	+8	6	
4	Costa Rica	4	1	0	3	17	27	−10	3	
5	Solomon Islands	4	0	0	4	13	39	−26	0	

Source: FIFA IOC
8 October 2018
18:00

Russia	1–6	Brazil
Fedorov 37'	Report (FIFA); Report (IOC) Category:Futsal at the 2018 Summer Youth Olympics – Boys First Round – RUS-BRA on Wikimedia Commons	Neguinho 13', 39'; Breno 21'; Wesley 23'; Yuri 24' (pen.); Guilhermão 39'

Tecnópolis
Attendance: 1,250
Referee: Mohamed Hassan (Egypt)

10 October 2018
18:00

Brazil	4–0	Iran
Guilhermão 1', 16'; Neguinho 29'; Moura 38'	Report (FIFA); Report (IOC) Category:Futsal at the 2018 Summer Youth Olympics – Boys First Round – BRA-IRI on Wikimedia Commons

CeNARD
Attendance: 788
Referee: Miguel Oliveira (Portugal)

11 October 2018
18:00

Brazil	6–2	Costa Rica
Guilhermão 3', 4', 39'; Wesley 19', 27'; Vitão 24'	Report (FIFA); Report (IOC)	Carvajal 23'; León 39'

Tecnópolis
Attendance: 1,570
Referee: Ovidiu Curta (Romania)

13 October 2018
18:00

Solomon Islands	1–9	Brazil
Mana 26'	Report (FIFA); Report (IOC)	Guilhermão 1', 10', 21', 24'; Vitão 5'; Cromwell 10' (o.g.); Breno 11'; Wesley 38', 38'

CeNARD
Attendance: 0
Referee: Chiara Perona (Italy)

Semifinals

15 October 2018
20:00

Brazil	3–2	Argentina
Guilhermão 1'; Neguinho 11'; Breno 28'	Report (FIFA); Report (IOC)	Raggiati 19' (pen.); Rufino 21'

Tecnópolis
Attendance: 6,500
Referee: Nikola Jelić (Croatia)

Gold medal match

18 October 2018
13:00

Brazil	4–1	Russia
Karpiuk 1' (o.g.); Breno 20'; Moura 28'; Françoar 39'	Report (FIFA); Report (IOC) Category:Futsal at the 2018 Summer Youth Olympics – Boys Final on Wikimedia Commons	Samusenko 38'

Tecnópolis
Attendance: 3,400
Referee: Mohamed Hassan (Egypt)

== Gymnastics ==
=== Artistic ===
Brazil qualified two gymnasts based on its performance at the 2018 American Junior Championship.

- Boys' artistic individual all-around – Diogo Soares
- Girls' artistic individual all-around – Laura Leónardo

=== Rhythmic ===
Brazil qualified one gymnast based on its performance at the 2018 American Junior Championship.

- Girls' rhythmic individual all-around – Maria Eduarda Arakaki

== Judo ==
- Boys' half lightweight – João Vitor dos Santos
- Girls' half heavyweight – Eduarda Rosa

Individual

Athlete	Event	Preliminary round	Round of 16	Quarterfinals	Semifinals	Rep	Rep 1	Rep 2	Rep 3	Final / BM	
Athlete	Event	Opposition Result	Opposition Result	Opposition Result	Opposition Result	Opposition Result	Opposition Result	Opposition Result	Opposition Result	Opposition Result	Rank
Eduarda Rosa	Girls' 78 kg	—N/a	Bye	Omaria Ramírez (DOM); W 10-00s2	Raffaela Igl (GER); L 00s3-10s2	—N/a	Bye			Edith Ortiz (ECU); W 10s2-00H	3rd place, bronze medalist(s)
João Santos	Boys' 66 kg	Kimy Bravo (CUB); L 00s2-01	Bye			Sultan Zhenishbekov (KGZ); W 10-00	Ahad Al-Sagheer (YEM); W 10-00	Jalen Kon Elijah (CMR); W 11-00	Kimy Bravo (CUB); L 00s2-01s2	Did not advance	5

Team

Athletes	Event	Round of 16	Quarterfinals	Semifinals	Final	
Athletes	Event	Opposition Result	Opposition Result	Opposition Result	Opposition Result	Rank
Team London; Yangchen Wangmo (BHU); Daniel Leutgeb (AUT); Noemi Huayhuameza Orneta (PER); Joao Santos (BRA); Rachel Krapman (CAN); Ahmed Rebahi (ALG); Edith Ortiz (ECU); Bekarys Saduakas (KAZ)	Mixed team	Bye	Team Moscow (MIX); W 4–3	Team Beijing (MIX); L 0–7	Did not advance	3rd place, bronze medalist(s)
Team Singapore; Ahad Al-Sagheer (YEM); Anastasia Balaban (UKR); Bryan Garboa (ECU); Sarah Kafufula (COD); Mariem Khlifi (TUN); Ahmed Mohamed Fahmy (EGY); Eduarda Rosa (BRA); Ilia Sulamanidze (GEO)	Mixed team	Team Moscow (MIX); L 3–4	Did not advance			

== Modern pentathlon ==
Brazil qualified one pentathlete based on its performance at the Pan American Youth Olympic Games Qualifier.

- Girls' Individual – Maria Ieda Guimarães

== Rowing ==
Brazil qualified one boat based on its performance at the Americas Qualification Regatta.

- Boys' single sculls – Marco Misasi

== Sailing ==
Brazil qualified one boat based on its performance at the Central and South American IKA Twin Tip Qualifiers. Brazil later qualified two boats based on its performance at the Central and South American Techno 293+ Qualifiers.

- Boys' Techno 293+ – Guilherme Plentz
- Boys' IKA Twin Tip Racing – Manoel dos Santos Neto
- Girls' Techno 293+ – Giovana Prada

== Swimming ==
- Boys' events – 4 athletes
  - André Luiz de Souza
  - Lucas Peixoto
  - Murilo Sartori
  - Vitor de Souza
- Girls' events – 4 athletes
  - Ana Carolina Vieira
  - Fernanda de Goeij
  - Maria Pessanha
  - Rafaela Raurich

Mixed

Athlete	Event	Heat		Final	
Athlete	Event	Time	Rank	Time	Rank
André de Souza; Lucas Peixoto; Ana Vieira; Rafaela Raurich	4 × 100 m freestyle relay	3:30.92	1	3:30.13	Silver

== Taekwondo ==
- Girls' 55 kg – Sandy Macedo

Athlete	Event	Round of 16	Quarterfinals	Semifinals	Final	Rank
Athlete	Event	Opposition Result	Opposition Result	Opposition Result	Opposition Result	Rank
Sandy Macedo	Girls' −55kg	Bye	Maya Magdy Badawy (EGY); W 23-3	Safia Salih (MAR); L 1-4	Did not advance	3rd place, bronze medalist(s)

== Table tennis ==
Brazil qualified two table tennis players based on its performance at the Latin American Continental Qualifier.

- Boys' singles – Guilherme Teodoro
- Girls' singles – Bruna Takahashi

== Tennis ==
Brazil qualified one tennis player based on the ITF World Junior Rankings.

Key

- r = Retired

Singles

Athlete	Event	Round of 32	Round of 16	Quarterfinals	Semifinals	Final / BM	
Athlete	Event	Opposition Score	Opposition Score	Opposition Score	Opposition Score	Opposition Score	Rank
Gilbert Soares Klier Júnior	Boys' singles	Miladinović (SRB); W (6–4, 4–6, 6–2)	Baird (USA); W (7–6^{7}, 6–4)	Báez (ARG); W (6–4, 6–4)	Gaston (FRA); L (4–6, 1–6)	Andreev (BUL); W (6–4, 3–1^{r})	3rd place, bronze medalist(s)

Doubles

Athletes	Event	Round of 32	Round of 16	Quarterfinals	Semifinals	Final / BM	
Athletes	Event	Opposition Score	Opposition Score	Opposition Score	Opposition Score	Opposition Score	Rank
Gilbert Soares Klier Júnior; Nicolás Mejía (COL)	Boys' doubles	—N/a	Baird (USA) / Boyer (USA); W (6–3, 7–6^{6})	Andreev (BUL) / Hijikata (AUS); L (6^{6}-7, 6–4, [7–10])	Did not advance		5
Naho Sato (JPN); Gilbert Soares Klier Júnior	Mixed doubles	Drummy (IRL); N'tcha (BEN); W (6–1, 6–1)	Oksana Selekhmeteva; Carlos López Montagud (MIX); L (4–6, 7–6^{8}, [6–10])	Did not advance			9

== Triathlon ==
Brazil qualified two athletes based on its performance at the 2018 American Youth Olympic Games Qualifier.

Individual

Athlete	Event	Swim (750m)	Trans 1	Bike (20 km)	Trans 2	Run (5 km)	Total Time	Rank
Pedro Boff da Silva	Boys	10:04	0:30	29:03	0:29	17:20	57:26	20
Giovanna Lacerda	Girls	10:33	0:48	31:18	0:31	18:17	1:01:27	14

Relay

Athlete	Event	Total Times per Athlete (Swim 250m, Bike 6.6 km, Run 1.8 km)	Total Group Time	Rank
Americas 2 Karina Clemant (VEN); Cristian Andres Triana Peña (COL); Giovanna Lacerda (BRA); Javier Antonio de la Peña Schott (MEX)	Mixed Relay	23:23 (11); 21:26 (6); 23:49 (6); 22:01 (7)	1:30:39 1P	6
Americas 4 Niuska Figueredo Bringa (CUB); Pedro Boff da Silva (BRA); Enya Noel (GRN); Alejandro Rodríguez Díez (CUB)	Mixed Relay	24:22 (15); 22:05 (11); 26:21 (13); 23:29 (12)	1:36:17	12

== Wrestling ==
Key:
- VFA – Victory by Fall
- VSU – Without any points scored by the opponent
- VSU1 – With point(s) scored by the opponent
- VPO – Without any points scored by the opponent
- VPO1 – With point(s) scored by the opponent

Athlete	Event	Group stage					Final / RM	Rank
Athlete	Event	Opposition Score	Opposition Score	Opposition Score	Opposition Score	Rank	Opposition Score	Rank
Igor Queiroz	Boys' Greco-Roman −92kg	Nosrati (IRI); L 0 – 5 ^{VPO}	Evloev (RUS); L 0 – 7 ^{VPO}	—N/a		3 Q	Bartley (ASA); W 10 – 0 ^{VSU}	5
Heloísa Martinez	Girls' freestyle −43kg	Ogunsanya (NGR); W 6 – 9 ^{VFA}	Nazarova (AZE); L 0 – 11 ^{VFA}	Shilson (USA); L 0 – 10 ^{VSU}	Vigouroux (FRA); L 2 – 11 ^{VFA}	4 Q	Mahmound (EGY); L 0 – 10 ^{VSU}	8
