= Swimming at the 2018 Summer Youth Olympics – Boys' 200 metre individual medley =

Swimming events of Summer Youth Olympics 2018

Boys' 200 metre individual medley at the 2018 Summer Youth Olympics
- Venue: Natatorium
- Dates: 8 October
- Competitors: 21 from 20 nations
- Winning time: 1:59.58

Medalists
gold medal	Tomoe Zenimoto Hvas	Norway
silver medal	Thomas Ceccon	Italy
bronze medal	Finlay Knox	Canada

The boys' 200 metre individual medley event at the 2018 Summer Youth Olympics took place on 8 October at the Natatorium in Buenos Aires, Argentina.

== Results ==
=== Heats ===
The heats were started at 10:00.

Rank	Heat	Lane	Name	Nationality	Time	Notes
1	2	4	Tomoe Zenimoto Hvas	Norway	1:59.77	Q, NR
2	1	3	Finlay Knox	Canada	2:04.17	Q
3	1	5	Gal Cohen Groumi	Israel	2:04.25	Q
4	3	3	Noè Ponti	Switzerland	2:04.30	Q
5	1	6	Moncef Aymen Balamane	Algeria	2:04.39	Q
6	3	2	Jake Johnson	United States	2:04.48	Q
7	3	4	Thomas Ceccon	Italy	2:04.50	Q
8	3	6	Gábor Zombori	Hungary	2:04.55	Q
9	3	5	José Lopes	Portugal	2:04.64	
10	1	4	Jarod Arroyo	Puerto Rico	2:05.17	
11	2	5	Jakub Lahoda	Czech Republic	2:05.49	
12	2	2	Maximillian Ang	Singapore	2:05.96	
13	3	1	Dušan Babić	Serbia	2:06.05	
14	2	7	Joaquín González	Argentina	2:06.78	
15	2	6	Hendrik Duvenhage	South Africa	2:06.89	
16	1	1	Marcus Mok	Hong Kong	2:07.49	
17	1	7	Arvin Chahal	Malaysia	2:08.56	
18	1	2	Demirkan Demir	Turkey	2:08.77	
19	2	1	Nichita Bortnicov	Moldova	2:09.04	
20	3	8	Low Zheng Yong	Malaysia	2:12.66	
21	3	7	Luis Weekes	Barbados	2:12.83	
	2	3	Jan Kałusowski	Poland	DNS	

=== Final ===
The final was held at 19:10.

Rank	Lane	Name	Nationality	Time	Notes
1st place, gold medalist(s)	4	Tomoe Zenimoto Hvas	Norway	1:59.58	NR
2nd place, silver medalist(s)	1	Thomas Ceccon	Italy	2:01.29	
3rd place, bronze medalist(s)	5	Finlay Knox	Canada	2:01.91	
4	3	Gal Cohen Groumi	Israel	2:02.41	
5	2	Moncef Aymen Balamane	Algeria	2:04.17	
6	6	Noè Ponti	Switzerland	2:04.20	
7	8	Gábor Zombori	Hungary	2:05.19	
8	7	Jake Johnson	United States	2:05.39	
