= Peru at the 2018 Summer Youth Olympics =

- IOC code: PER
- NOC: Peruvian Olympic Committee
- Website: http://www.coperu.org/

in Buenos Aires, Argentina 6 – 18 October 2018
- Competitors: 16 in 10 sports
- Medals: Gold 0 Silver 0 Bronze 0 Total 0

Summer Youth Olympics appearances
- 2010; 2014; 2018; 2026

Peru participated at the 2018 Summer Youth Olympics in Buenos Aires, Argentina from 6 October to 18 October 2018. The Peruvian Flag bearer was Andrea Marcel Hurtado Pereda (Swimming).

== Athletics ==
Peru qualified 2 athletes (1 boy and 1 girl) to compete in athletics.

- Boys: Kevin Cahuana (Men's 100 metres)
- Girls: Freysi Donaire (Women's 100 metres)

Athlete	Event	Stage 1		Stage 2		Total	
Athlete	Event	Result	Rank	Result	Rank	Total	Rank
Kevin Cahuana	Boys' 100 metres	22:08.21	13	22:44.77	11	44:52.98	11
Freysi Donaires	Girls' 100 metres	25:13.94	11	25:56.71	10	51:10.65	10

== Badminton ==
Peru qualified one player based on the Badminton Junior World Rankings.

Singles

Athlete	Event	Group stage				Quarterfinal	Semifinal	Final / BM	Rank
Athlete	Event	Opposition Score	Opposition Score	Opposition Score	Rank	Opposition Score	Opposition Score	Opposition Score	Rank
Fernanda Saponara Rivva	Girls' Singles	Gai (USA); L 0–2	Andreu (ESP); L 0–2	Vaishnavi Reddy (IND); L 0–2	4	did not advance			9

Team

Athlete	Event	Group stage				Quarterfinal	Semifinal	Final / BM	Rank
Athlete	Event	Opposition Score	Opposition Score	Opposition Score	Rank	Opposition Score	Opposition Score	Opposition Score	Rank
Team Gamma; Fernanda Saponara Rivva (PER); Uriel Canjura (ESA); Joel Koh (SGP); Li Shifeng (CHN); Alonso Medel (CHI); Halla Bouksani (ALG); Jakka Vaishnavi Reddy (IND)	Mixed Teams	Omega (MIX); L (99–110)	Sigma (MIX); L (86–110)	Theta (MIX); W (110–107)	3Q	Alpha (MIX); L (94–110)	did not advance		5

== Beach volleyball ==
Peru qualified a girls' team based on their overall ranking from the South American Youth Tour.

- Girls' tournament: Madelyn Mendoza and Lisbeth Allca

Athletes	Event	Preliminary round		Round of 24	Round of 16	Quarterfinals	Semifinals	Final / BM	
Athletes	Event	Opposition Score	Rank	Opposition Score	Opposition Score	Opposition Score	Opposition Score	Opposition Score	Rank
Allcca; Mendoza	Girls'	Isatu–Iye (SLE); W 2–0; Sinaportar–Mucheza (MOZ); W 2–1; Olimstad–Berntsen (NOR); L 1–2	2	Roskic–Vermette (CAN); W 2–1	Newberry–Sparks (USA); L 0–2	did not advance			

== Judo ==
Peru qualified one athlete in judo.

- Girls: Noemí Huayhuameza (Women −52 kg)

Individual

Athlete	Event	Round of 16	Quarterfinals	Semifinals	Rep 1	Rep 2	Rep 3	Final / BM	Rank
Athlete	Event	Opposition Result	Opposition Result	Opposition Result	Opposition Result	Opposition Result	Opposition Result	Opposition Result	Rank
Noemí Huayhuameza	Girls' 52 kg	Veronica Toniolo (ITA); L 00s2-10	did not advance		Augusta Ambourouet (GAB); W 10–00	Fatine Rzal (MAR); W 1s2-00s1	Sairy Colón (PUR); L 00–10	did not advance	

Team

Athletes	Event	Round of 16	Quarterfinals	Semifinals	Final	
Athletes	Event	Opposition Result	Opposition Result	Opposition Result	Opposition Result	Rank
Team London; Yangchen Wangmo (BHU); Daniel Leutgeb (AUT); Noemi Huayhuameza Orneta (PER); Joao Santos (BRA); Rachel Krapman (CAN); Ahmed Rebahi (ALG); Edith Ortiz (ECU); Bekarys Saduakas (KAZ)	Mixed team	Bye	Team Moscow (MIX); W 4–3	Team Beijing (MIX); L 0–7	did not advance	3rd place, bronze medalist(s)

== Rowing ==
Peru qualified one boat based on its performance at the American Qualification Regatta.

- Boys' single sculls: Ángel Sosa

== Sailing ==
Peru qualified two boats based on its performance at the Central and South American Techno 293+ Qualifiers.

- Boys' Techno 293+: Raúl Claux Villa
- Girls' Techno 293+: Cristina Arróspide

== Shooting ==
Peru qualified one shooter.

- Boys' 10m Air Rifle: Carlos Arze

Individual

Athlete	Event	Qualification		Final	
Athlete	Event	Points	Rank	Points	Rank
Carlos Gabriel Arze Tassara	Boys' 10 m air rifle	599.4	19	did not advance	

Mixed

Athlete	Event	Qualification		Round of 16	Quarterfinal	Semifinal	Final	
Athlete	Event	Points	Rank	Opposition Score	Opposition Score	Opposition Score	Opposition Score	Rank
Carlos Arze (PER) / Mehuli Ghosh (IND)	Mixed 10 metre air rifle	809.9	19	did not advance				19

== Swimming ==
Peru qualified 3 athletes (1 boy and 2 girls) to compete in swimming.

- Boys: Adrián Paseta (Men's 100m and 200m Butterfly)
- Girls: Samantha Bello (Women's 200m, 400m and 800m Freestyle) and Andrea Hurtado (Women's 100m and 200m Backstroke)

== Triathlon ==
Peru qualified one athlete based on its performance at the 2018 American Youth Olympic Games Qualifier.

Individual

Athlete	Event	Swim (750m)	Trans 1	Bike (20 km)	Trans 2	Run (5 km)	Total Time	Rank
Naomi Espinoza Guablocho	Girls	10:34	0:51	36:51	0:37	21:08	1:10:01	30

Relay

Athlete	Event	Total Times per Athlete (Swim 250m, Bike 6.6 km, Run 1.8 km)	Total Group Time	Rank
Americas 5 Maryhelen Albright (USA); Giannon Lisandro Eights (ARU); Naomi Espinoza Guablocho (PER); Dominic Pugliese (ISV)	Mixed Relay	22:45 (6); 23:11 (12); 25:15 (10); 24:06 (13)	1:35:17	11

== Weightlifting ==
Peru qualified one quota in the boys' events and one quota in the girls' events based on the team ranking after the 2017 Weightlifting Youth World Championships.

Boy

Athlete	Event	Snatch		Clean & Jerk		Total	Rank
Athlete	Event	Result	Rank	Result	Rank	Total	Rank
Santiago Daniel Villegas Fernández	−77 kg	120	4	154	4	274	4

Girl

Athlete	Event	Snatch		Clean & jerk		Total	Rank
Athlete	Event	Result	Rank	Result	Rank	Total	Rank
Gianella Valdiviezo	−53 kg	63	5	80	5	143	5
