= Virgin Islands at the 2018 Summer Youth Olympics =

- IOC code: ISV
- NOC: Virgin Islands Olympic Committee

in Buenos Aires, Argentina 6 – 18 October 2018
- Competitors: 4 in 3 sports
- Medals: Gold 0 Silver 0 Bronze 0 Total 0

Summer Youth Olympics appearances
- 2010; 2014; 2018

The US Virgin Islands participated at the 2018 Summer Youth Olympics in Buenos Aires, Argentina from 6 October to 18 October 2018.

== Triathlon ==
Individual

| Athlete | Event | Swim (750m) | Trans 1 | Bike (20 km) | Trans 2 | Run (5 km) | Total Time | Rank |
|---|---|---|---|---|---|---|---|---|
| Dominic Pugliese | Boys | 11:32 | 0:32 | —N/a | | | LAP | NM |

Relay

| Athlete | Event | Total Times per Athlete (Swim 250m, Bike 6.6 km, Run 1.8 km) | Total Group Time | Rank |
|---|---|---|---|---|
| Americas 5 Maryhelen Albright (USA); Giannon Lisandro Eights (ARU); Naomi Espinoza Guablocho (PER); Dominic Pugliese (ISV) | Mixed Relay | 22:45 (6); 23:11 (12); 25:15 (10); 24:06 (13) | 1:35:17 | 11 |
