= Tomoe Hvas =

Norwegian swimmer (born 2000)

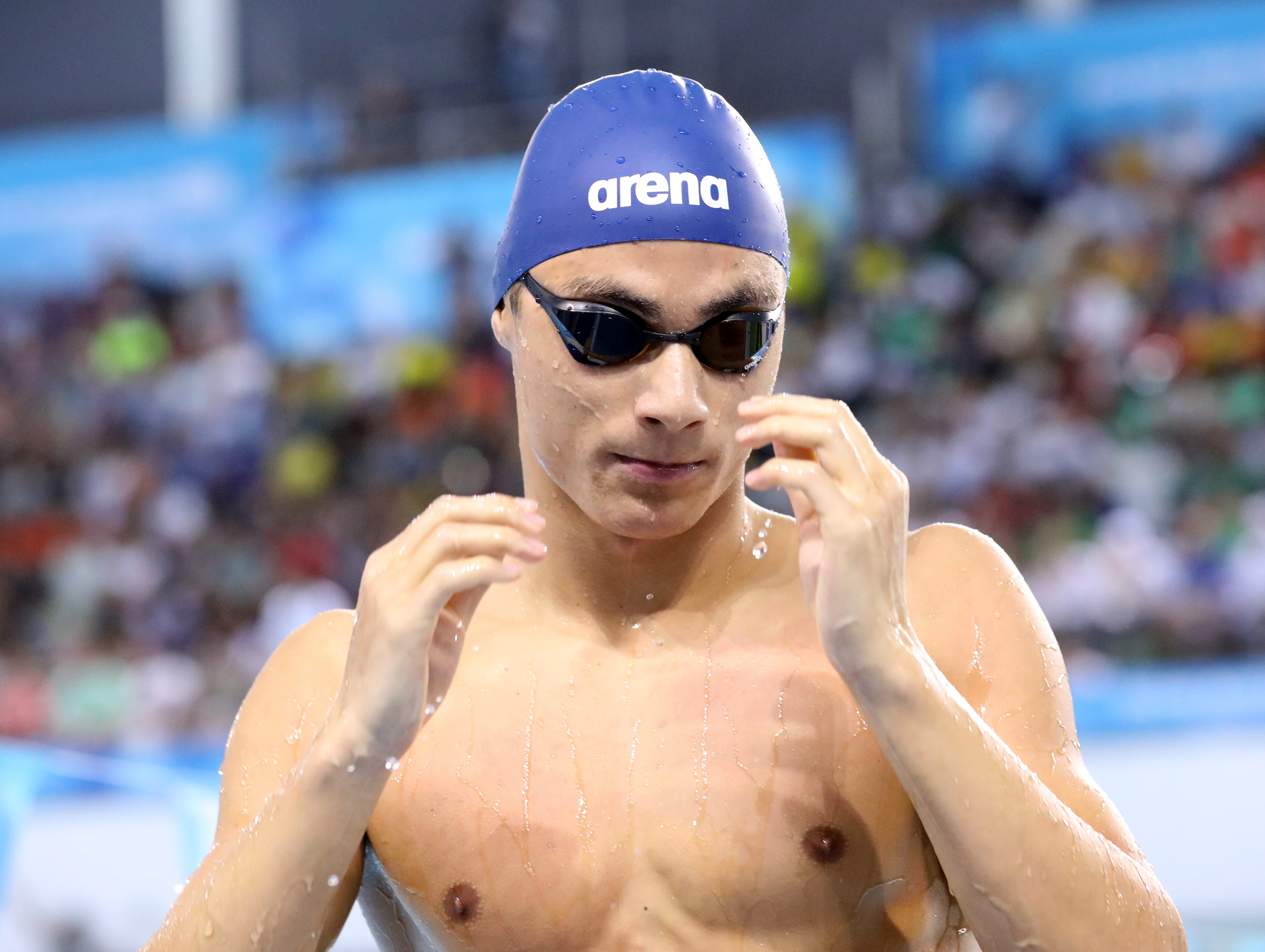
- Tomoe Zenimoto Hvas, 2018

Personal information
- Full name: Tomoe Zenimoto Hvas
- Nationality: Norwegian
- Born: 1 June 2000 (age 26) Oslo, Norway
- Height: 1.86 m (6 ft 1 in)
- Weight: 78 kg (172 lb)

Sport
- Sport: Swimming
- Club: Bærumsvømmerne
Medal record
World Championships (SC)
Silver medal – second place	2021 Abu Dhabi	100 m medley
European Championships (SC)
Bronze medal – third place	2017 Copenhagen	200 m medley
Silver medal – second place	2019 Glasgow	200 m medley
Youth Olympic Games
Gold medal – first place	2018 Buenos Aires	200 m medley
Silver medal – second place	2018 Buenos Aires	50 m butterfly
Bronze medal – third place	2018 Buenos Aires	50 m backstroke
European Junior Championships
Silver medal – second place	2018 Helsinki	50 m butterfly

Tomoe Zenimoto Hvas (born 1 June 2000) is a Norwegian swimmer. He competed in the men's 50 metre butterfly at the 2019 World Aquatics Championships. He comes from Bærum, and has a Norwegian father and Japanese mother; also residing in Japan from 2007 to 2010. In 2022, he retired from swimming competitions at only 22 years old, holding 18 Norwegian national records.

Olympic Games
Preceded by Ole-Kristian Bryhn	Flagbearer for Norway; Tokyo 2020; With: Anne Vilde Tuxen	Succeeded by Katrine Lunde; Christian Sørum
