= Kasib =

Kasib Касиб
- Selo
- Location within Perm Krai Location within Russia
- Coordinates: 59°41′N 56°20′E
- Country: Russia
- Region: Perm Krai
- District: Solikamsky District
- Time zone: UTC+5:00

Kasib (Russian: Касиб) is a rural locality (a selo) and the administrative center of Kasibskoye Rural Settlement, Solikamsky District, Perm Krai, Russia. The population was 549 as of 2010. There are 18 streets.

== Geography ==
Kasib is located 55 km northwest of Solikamsk (the district's administrative centre) by road. Sorvino is the nearest rural locality.
