= Sebastian Somerset =

British swimmer (born 2001)

Personal information
- Full name: Sebastian James Somerset
- Nationality: British
- Citizenship: British and Canadian
- Born: 15 January 2001 (age 25) Birmingham, England

Sport
- Sport: Swimming
- Event: Backstroke
- University team: University of California, Berkeley
- Club: Loughborough Swimming

Sebastian James Somerset (born 15 January 2001) is a British international swimmer who became the British Champion for the 50 metres backstroke in 2022. He has lived in Canada, Australia and England, and is currently a student at the University of California, Berkeley.

== Biography ==
Somerset was educated at Rundle College High School and the University of California, Berkeley. He was a member of the Canadian Junior team and competed in the 2018 Junior Pan Pacific Championships, the 2018 Summer Youth Olympics and the 2019 Junior World Championships for Canada.

In 2022, he became the British champion when claiming the gold medal over 50 metres backstroke at the 2022 British Swimming Championships. He made his senior British debut at the 2022 European Aquatics Championships.
