= Maria Lazurenko =

Russian beach volleyball player

Maria Bocharova
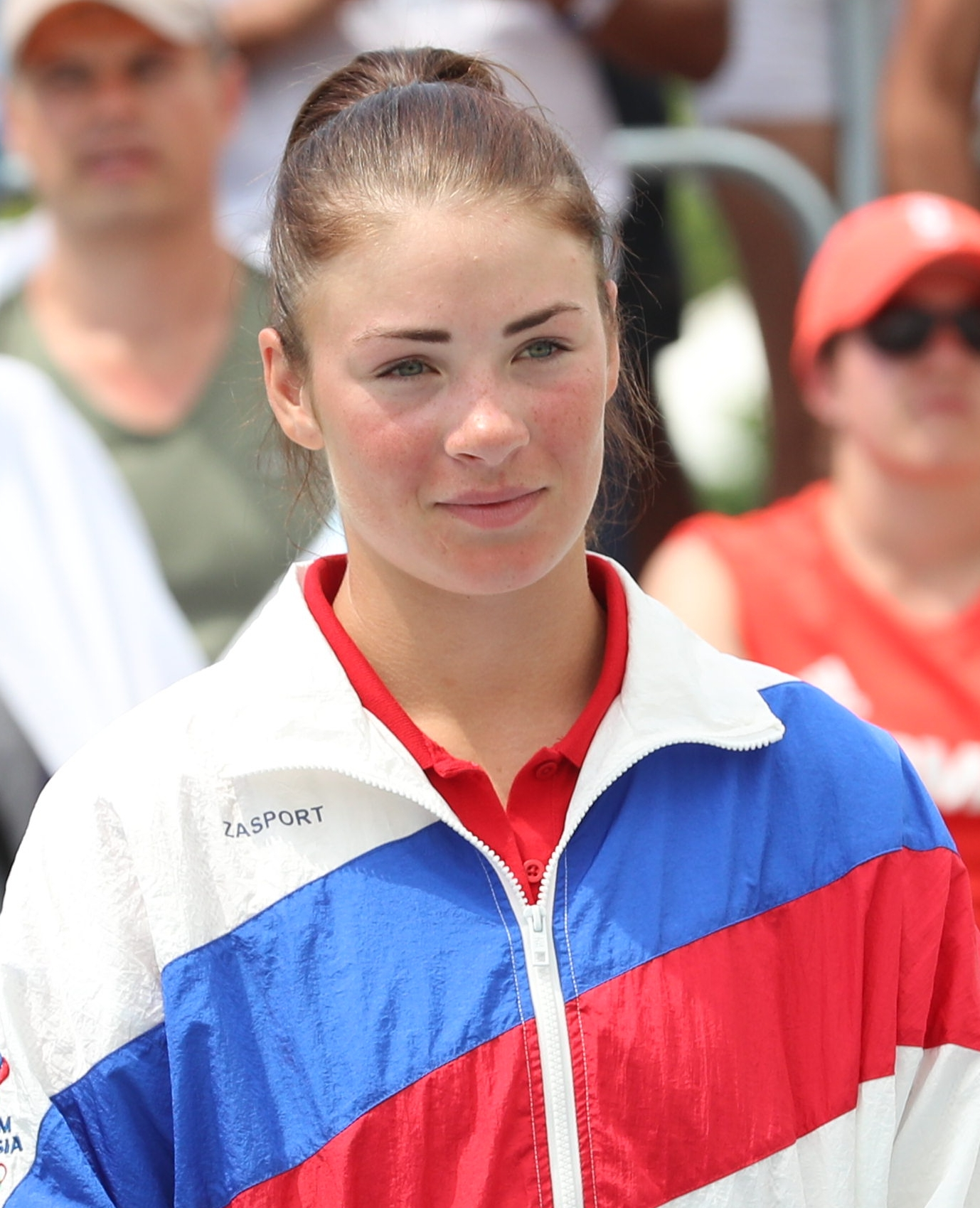
- Bocharova in 2018

Personal information
- Full name: Maria Aleksandrovna Lazurenko
- Born: 23 February 2002 (age 24); Obninsk, Kaluga Oblast, Russia
- Hometown: Obninsk
- Height: 185 cm (6 ft 1 in)
- Weight: 72 kg (159 lb)

Beach volleyball information

Current teammate
Teammate
Maria Bocharova

Career
Teams
	Russia VC Obninsk
Honours
Women's beach volleyball
Representing Russia
Youth Olympic Games
Gold medal – first place	2018 Buenos Aires	Beach
U19 World Championships
Gold medal – first place	2018 Nanjing
U21 World Championships
Silver medal – second place	2019 Udontani

Maria Aleksandrovna Lazurenko (née Bocharova; also spelled Mariia Bocharova; Russian: Мария Бочарова; born 23 February 2002) is a Russian beach volleyball player. Partnered with Maria Voronina, she is the 2018 Youth Olympic champion among girls.

== Career ==
Bocharova was a member of the Obninsk beach volleyball school for eight years and she was coached under Elena Masalyova.

Bocharova and her teammate Maria Voronina won the European Junior Championships U18 and U20 in 2017 and in 2018 they won the FIVB Beach Volleyball U19 World Championships.

At 2018 Summer Youth Olympics the Voronina–Bocharova duet made it to the final, they beat a couple from Italy Scampoli–Bertozzi (21:19, 21:19) and won the championship.

At 2019 Beach Volleyball U21 World Championship the Voronina–Bocharova duet made it to the final, but lost to a couple from Brazil Victoria-Vitoria in a difficult dramatic tie-break match:

Russia 1—Brazil 2 (21–17;15–21;13–15) was her first major failure.
