= Maria Egorova =

Russian beach volleyball player (born 2000)

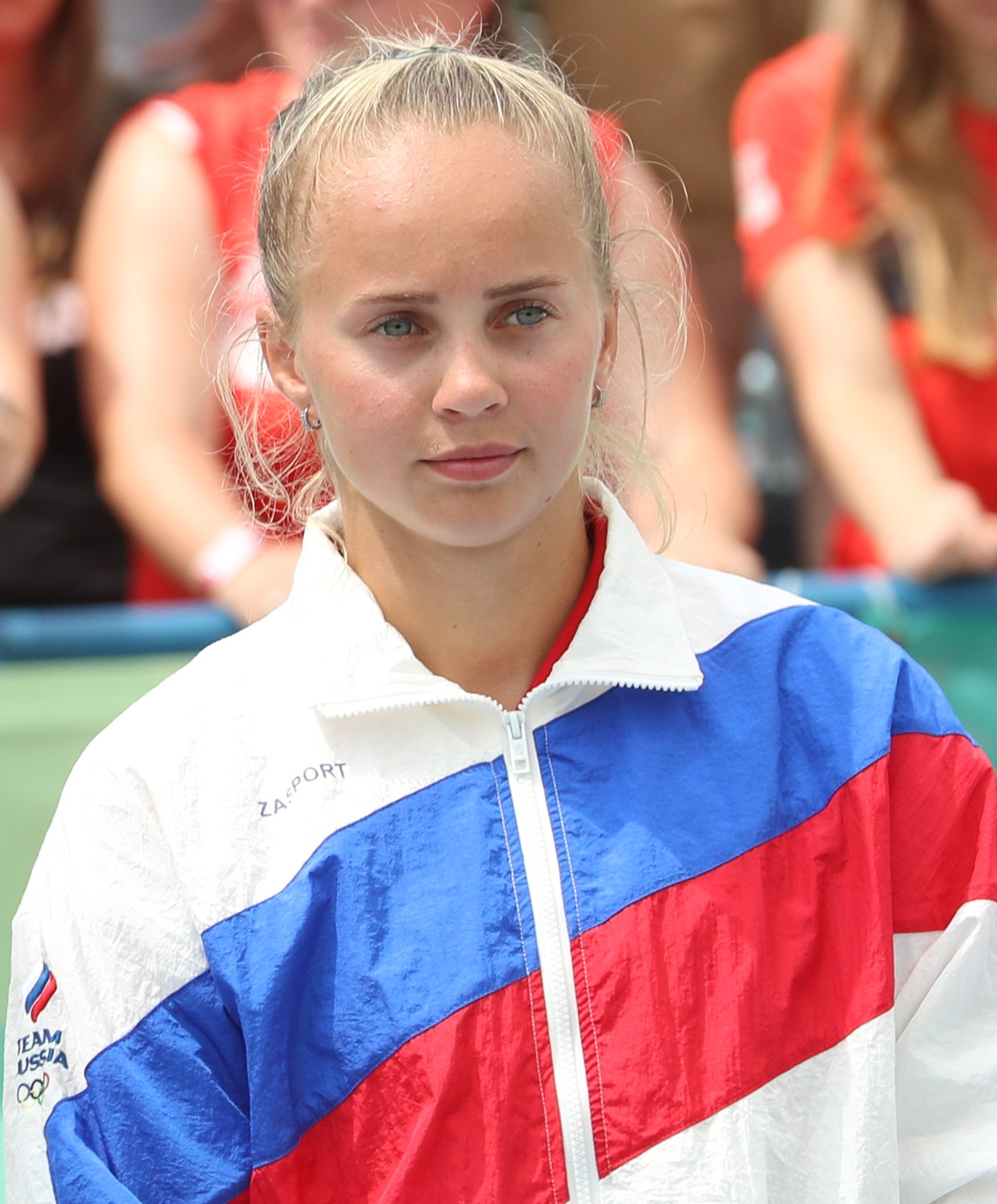
- Voronina in 2018

Personal information
- Full name: Maria Aleksandrovna Egorova
- Born: Maria Aleksandrovna Voronina; February 18, 2000 (age 26); Obninsk, Kaluga Oblast, Russia
- Hometown: Obninsk
- Height: 168 cm (5 ft 6 in)
- Weight: 61 kg (134 lb)

Beach volleyball information

Current teammate
Teammate
Maria Bocharova

Career
Teams
	Russia VC Obninsk
Honours
Women's beach volleyball
Representing Russia
Youth Olympic Games
Gold medal – first place	2018 Buenos Aires	Beach
U19 World Championships
Gold medal – first place	2018 Nanjing
U21 World Championships
Silver medal – second place	2019 Udonthani

Maria Aleksandrovna Egorova (née Voronina) (Russian: Мари́я Алекса́ндровна Воро́нина; born February 18, 2000, in Obninsk) is a Russian beach volleyball player. She is a Youth Olympic champion 2018 with Maria Bocharova.

== Career ==
Voronina was a member of the Obninsk beach volleyball school for eight years and she was coached under Elena Masalyova.

Voronina and her teammate Maria Bocharova won the European Junior Championships U18 and U20 in 2017 and in 2018 they won the FIVB Beach Volleyball U19 World Championships.

At 2018 Summer Youth Olympics the Voronina–Bocharova duet made it to the final, they beat a couple from Italy Scampoli–Bertozzi (21:19, 21:19) and won the championship.

At 2019 Beach Volleyball U21 World Championship the Voronina–Bocharova duet made it to the final, but lost to a couple from Brazil Victoria-Vitoria in a difficult dramatic tie-break match:

Russia 1—Brazil 2 (21–17;15–21;13–15) was her first major failure.
