= Beach volleyball at the 2018 Summer Youth Olympics =

Beach volleyball at the III Summer Youth Olympic Games
- Beach volleyball pictogram
- Venue: Parque Tres de Febrero
- Dates: 7–17 October
- No. of events: 2 (1 boys and 1 girls)
- Competitors: 128 (64 boys and 64 girls)
- Teams: 32+32

Beach volleyball at the 2018 Summer Youth Olympics was held from 7 to 17 October. The events took place at the Parque Tres de Febrero in Buenos Aires, Argentina.

== Qualification ==
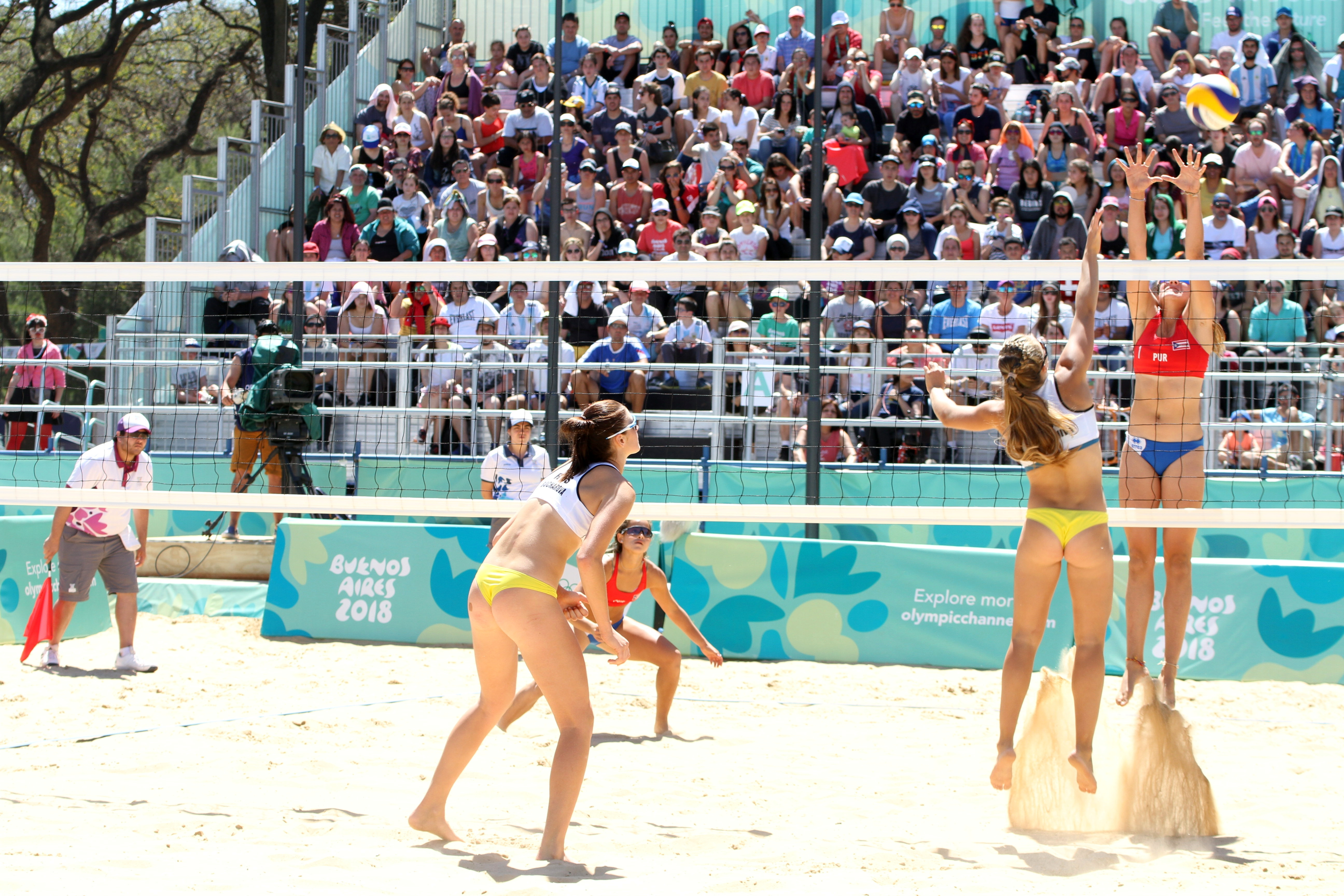
Game at the 2018 Summer Youth Olympics

A total of 32 teams will participate in each gender. Each National Olympic Committee (NOC) can enter a maximum of 2 teams of 2 athletes, 1 per each gender. As hosts, Argentina was given the maximum quota and a further 10 teams, 5 in each gender will be decided by the Tripartite Commission. The remaining quotas were to be decided at the 2018 Beach Volleyball U19 World Championship and qualifiers decided by the five continental regions. The U19 World Championship will have priority over the continental qualifiers. Each region is allocated five teams per gender, however there must by 50% participation for the continent to be given the complete quota, if not the quotas will be reduced.

Only athletes born between 1 January 2000 and 31 December 2003 were eligible to participate in the 2018 Youth Olympics.

=== Boys ===
Event	Location	Date	Total Teams	Qualified
Host Nation	–	–	1	Argentina
2018 U19 World Championship	(China) Nanjing	10–15 July 2018	1	Russia
2018 Oceania U19 Championship	(Australia) Canberra	1–3 March 2018	2	Australia; New Zealand
2018 AFECAVOL Zone U19 Championship	(Costa Rica) Puntarenas	8–12 March 2018	1	Costa Rica
2018 Asian U19 Championship	(Thailand) Nakhon Pathom	23–25 March 2018	2	Indonesia; Thailand
2018 Central Zone U19 Championship	(Cuba) Havana	25–28 May 2018	2	Cuba; Puerto Rico
2017–18 European Youth Continental Cup Final	(Austria) Baden	8–10 June 2018	5	Czech Republic; Great Britain; Hungary; Netherlands; Sweden
2018 EVCA Zone U19 Championship	(Antigua and Barbuda) St. John's	14–18 June 2018	1	Saint Vincent and the Grenadines
South American Youth Tour Final Rankings	Various	17 June 2018	5	Bolivia; Chile; Ecuador; Paraguay; Venezuela
2018 CAZOVA Zone U19 Championship	(Aruba) Oranjestad	6–9 July 2018	1	Aruba
2018 African U19 Championship	(Algeria) Algiers	19–28 July 2018	~~5~~ 4	Mozambique; Ghana; The Gambia; Mauritius; ~~Rwanda~~
Tripartite Invitation	–	–	~~5~~ 2	Monaco; Togo
Reallocation of unused spots	–	–	5	Brazil; Germany; Poland; United States; Switzerland
TOTAL			32	

=== Girls ===
Event	Location	Date	Total Teams	Qualified
Host Nation	–	–	1	Argentina
2018 U19 World Championship	(China) Nanjing	10–15 July 2018	1	Russia
2018 Oceania U19 Championship	(Australia) Canberra	1–3 March 2018	2	Australia; New Zealand
2018 AFECAVOL Zone U19 Championship	(Costa Rica) Puntarenas	8–12 March 2018	1	Guatemala
2018 Asian U19 Championship	(Thailand) Nakhon Pathom	23–25 March 2018	1	Thailand
2018 Central Zone U19 Championship	(Cuba) Havana	25–28 May 2018	2	Puerto Rico; United States
2017–18 European Youth Continental Cup Final	(Austria) Baden	8–10 June 2018	5	Italy; Norway; Poland; Spain; Netherlands
2018 EVCA Zone U19 Championship	(Antigua and Barbuda) St. John's	14–18 June 2018	1	Dominica
South American Youth Tour Final Rankings	Various	17 June 2018	5	Bolivia; Brazil; Paraguay; Peru; Venezuela
2018 CAZOVA Zone U19 Championship	(Aruba) Oranjestad	6–9 July 2018	1	Aruba
2018 African U19 Championship		19–28 July 2018	5	Mozambique; Rwanda; Egypt; Democratic Republic of the Congo; Sierra Leone
Tripartite Invitation	–	–	1	Vanuatu
Reallocation of unused spots	–	–	6	Canada; China; Ecuador; Mexico; Switzerland; Uruguay
TOTAL			32	

== Medal summary ==
=== Medal table ===
Rank	Nation	Gold	Silver	Bronze	Total
1	Russia	1	0	0	1
1	Sweden	1	0	0	1
3	Italy	0	1	0	1
3	Netherlands	0	1	0	1
5	Argentina	0	0	1	1
5	Norway	0	0	1	1
Totals (6 entries)		2	2	2	6

=== Events ===
Event	Gold	Silver	Bronze
Boys' Tournament	David Åhman; Jonatan Hellvig; Sweden	Yorick de Groot; Matthew Immers; Netherlands	Bautista Amieva; Mauro Zelayeta; Argentina
Girls' Tournament	Maria Voronina; Maria Bocharova; Russia	Claudia Scampoli; Nicol Bertozzi; Italy	Emilie Olimstad; Frida Berntsen; Norway
