= Swimming at the 2018 Summer Youth Olympics =

Swimming at the III Summer Youth Olympic Games
- Venue: Natatorium
- Dates: 7–12 October
- No. of events: 36 (17 boys, 17 girls, 2 mixed)
- Competitors: 390 from 139 nations

Swimming at the 2018 Summer Youth Olympics was held from 7 to 12 October at the Natatorium in Buenos Aires, Argentina.

== Schedule ==
The schedule was released by the Buenos Aires Youth Olympic Games Organizing Committee. In the table below, M stands for morning (begins 10:00), and E stands for evening (begins 18:00).

H	Heats	½	Semifinals	F	Final

Date →	Sun 7		Mon 8		Tue 9		Wed 10		Thu 11		Fri 12	
Event ↓	M	E	M	E	M	E	M	E	M	E	M	E
Boys' 50 m freestyle					H	½		F				
Boys' 100 m freestyle									H	½		F
Boys' 200 m freestyle			H	F								
Boys' 400 m freestyle	H	F										
Boys' 800 m freestyle									H	F		
Boys' 50 m backstroke					H	½		F				
Boys' 100 m backstroke	H	½		F								
Boys' 200 m backstroke											H	F
Boys' 50 m breaststroke									H	½		F
Boys' 100 m breaststroke	H	½		F								
Boys' 200 m breaststroke							H	F				
Boys' 50 m butterfly							H	½		F		
Boys' 100 m butterfly			H	½		F						
Boys' 200 m butterfly											H	F
Boys' 200 m individual medley			H	F								
Boys' 4×100 m freestyle relay						F						
Boys' 4×100 m medley relay							H	F				
Date →	Sun 7		Mon 8		Tue 9		Wed 10		Thu 11		Fri 12	
Event ↓	M	E	M	E	M	E	M	E	M	E	M	E
Girls' 50 m freestyle									H	½		F
Girls' 100 m freestyle			H	½		F						
Girls' 200 m freestyle							H	F				
Girls' 400 m freestyle											H	F
Girls' 800 m freestyle					H	F						
Girls' 50 m backstroke							H	½		F		
Girls' 100 m backstroke	H	½		F								
Girls' 200 m backstroke					H	F						
Girls' 50 m breaststroke	H	½		F								
Girls' 100 m breaststroke					H	½		F				
Girls' 200 m breaststroke											H	F
Girls' 50 m butterfly					H	½		F				
Girls' 100 m butterfly									H	½		F
Girls' 200 m butterfly			H	F								
Girls' 200 m individual medley	H	F										
Girls' 4×100 m freestyle relay										F		
Girls' 4×100 m medley relay				F								
Mixed 4×100 m freestyle relay	H	F										
Mixed 4×100 m medley relay											H	F

All times are local (UTC–3).

== Medal summary ==
=== Medal table ===
* Host nation (Argentina)

Rank	Nation	Gold	Silver	Bronze	Total
1	Russia	13	4	2	19
2	Hungary	7	1	0	8
3	China	3	4	2	9
4	Japan	2	2	4	8
5	Czech Republic	2	0	1	3
6	Italy	1	3	5	9
7	Australia	1	3	2	6
8	Lithuania	1	1	1	3
8	Norway	1	1	1	3
8	Sweden	1	1	1	3
11	South Africa	1	1	0	2
12	Israel	1	0	1	2
13	Moldova	1	0	0	1
13	Vietnam	1	0	0	1
15	Brazil	0	3	0	3
16	Argentina*	0	2	0	2
16	Romania	0	2	0	2
18	Canada	0	1	2	3
18	Poland	0	1	2	3
20	Belarus	0	1	1	2
20	Germany	0	1	1	2
22	Greece	0	1	0	1
22	Ireland	0	1	0	1
22	Kyrgyzstan	0	1	0	1
22	Serbia	0	1	0	1
22	Ukraine	0	1	0	1
27	Slovenia	0	0	3	3
28	Austria	0	0	2	2
28	France	0	0	2	2
30	Egypt	0	0	1	1
30	South Korea	0	0	1	1
30	Spain	0	0	1	1
30	United States	0	0	1	1
Totals (33 entries)		36	37	37	110

=== Events ===
==== Boys' events ====
Games	Gold		Silver		Bronze	
50 m freestyle	Thomas Ceccon; Italy	22.33	Daniil Markov; Russia	22.37	Abdelrahman Sameh; Egypt	22.43
100 m freestyle	Andrey Minakov; Russia	49.23	Jakub Kraska; Poland	49.26	Robin Hanson; Sweden	49.52
200 m freestyle	Kristóf Milák; Hungary	1:47.73	Robin Hanson; Sweden	1:48.14	Denis Loktev; Israel	1:48.53
400 m freestyle	Kristóf Milák; Hungary	3:48.08	Marco De Tullio; Italy	3:48.55	Keisuke Yoshida; Japan	3:48.68
800 m freestyle	Nguyễn Huy Hoàng; Vietnam	7:50.20; NR	Keisuke Yoshida; Japan	7:53.85	Marco De Tullio; Italy	7:55.81
50 m backstroke	Kliment Kolesnikov; Russia	24.40	Thomas Ceccon; Italy	25.27	Tomoe Zenimoto Hvas; Norway	25.28
100 m backstroke	Kliment Kolesnikov; Russia	53.26	Daniel Martin; Romania	53.59	Thomas Ceccon; Italy	53.65
200 m backstroke	Kliment Kolesnikov; Russia	1:56.14	Daniel Martin; Romania	1:58.20	Manuel Martos; Spain	1:59.37
50 m breaststroke	Michael Houlie; South Africa	27.51	Sun Jiajun; China	27.85	Alexander Milanovich; Canada	27.87
100 m breaststroke	Sun Jiajun; China	1:00.59	Denis Petrashov; Kyrgyzstan	1:01.34	Taku Taniguchi; Japan	1:01.40
200 m breaststroke	Yu Hanaguruma; Japan	2:11.63	Savvas Thomoglou; Greece	2:13.62	Jan Kałusowski; Poland	2:13.72
50 m butterfly	Andrey Minakov; Russia	23.62	Tomoe Zenimoto Hvas; Norway Daniil Markov; Russia	23.63	Not awarded	
100 m butterfly	Andrey Minakov; Russia	51.12; NR	Kristóf Milák; Hungary	51.50	Federico Burdisso; Italy	52.42
200 m butterfly	Kristóf Milák; Hungary	1:54.89	Denys Kesil; Ukraine	1:55.89	Federico Burdisso; Italy	1:57.16
200 m individual medley	Tomoe Zenimoto Hvas; Norway	1:59.58; NR	Thomas Ceccon; Italy	2:01.29	Finlay Knox; Canada	2:01.91
4×100 m freestyle relay	Russia; Kliment Kolesnikov (48.04); Daniil Markov (49.58); Vladislav Gerasimenko (51.56); Andrey Minakov (48.93)	3:18.11	Brazil; Murilo Sartori (50.55); Lucas Peixoto (49.70); André Calvelo (48.87); Vitor de Souza (51.87)	3:20.99	Italy; Federico Burdisso (50.06); Thomas Ceccon (49.33); Marco De Tullio (50.84); Johannes Calloni (51.78)	3:22.01
4×100 m medley relay	Russia; Kliment Kolesnikov (53.34); Vladislav Gerasimenko (1:01.50); Andrey Minakov (51.14); Daniil Markov (49.19)	3:35.17; WJ	China; Wang Guanbin (55.82); Sun Jiajun (1:00.12); Shen Jiahao (52.65); Hong Jinquan (50.06)	3:38.65	Poland; Jakub Kraska (55.79); Jan Kałusowski (1:01.92); Jakub Majerski (52.00); Bartłomiej Koziejko (51.80)	3:41.51

==== Girls' events ====
Games	Gold		Silver		Bronze	
50 m freestyle	Barbora Seemanová; Czech Republic	25.14	Mayuka Yamamoto; Japan	25.39	Yang Junxuan; China Neža Klančar; Slovenia	25.47
100 m freestyle	Barbora Seemanová; Czech Republic	54.19; NR	Yang Junxuan; China	54.43	Neža Klančar; Slovenia	54.55; NR
200 m freestyle	Ajna Késely; Hungary	1:57.88	Yang Junxuan; China	1:58.05	Barbora Seemanová; Czech Republic	1:58.25
400 m freestyle	Ajna Késely; Hungary	4:07.14	Delfina Pignatiello; Argentina	4:10.40	Marlene Kahler; Austria	4:12.48
800 m freestyle	Ajna Késely; Hungary	8:27.60	Delfina Pignatiello; Argentina	8:32.42	Marlene Kahler; Austria	8:36.57
50 m backstroke	Kaylee McKeown; Australia	28.28	Daria Vaskina; Russia	28.38	Lila Touili; France	28.78
100 m backstroke	Daria Vaskina; Russia	1:00.45	Kaylee McKeown; Australia	1:00.58	Rhyan White; United States	1:00.60
200 m backstroke	Tatiana Salcuțan; Moldova	2:10.13	Madison Broad; Canada	2:10.32	Kaylee McKeown; Australia	2:10.67
50 m breaststroke	Agnė Šeleikaitė; Lithuania	31.37	Chelsea Hodges; Australia	31.42	Tina Čelik; Slovenia	31.75
100 m breaststroke	Anastasia Makarova; Russia	1:07.88	Niamh Coyne; Ireland	1:08.90	Kotryna Teterevkova; Lithuania	1:08.95
200 m breaststroke	Shiori Asaba; Japan	2:26.80	Kotryna Teterevkova; Lithuania	2:28.18	Wang Hee-song; South Korea	2:28.83
50 m butterfly	Sara Junevik; Sweden	26.40	Anastasiya Shkurdai; Belarus	26.62	Polina Egorova; Russia Angelina Köhler; Germany	26.68
100 m butterfly	Polina Egorova; Russia	59.22	Angelina Köhler; Germany	59.44	Anastasiya Shkurdai; Belarus	59.76
200 m butterfly	Blanka Berecz; Hungary	2:10.37	Duné Coetzee; South Africa	2:11.71	Michaela Ryan; Australia	2:13.12
200 m individual medley	Anastasia Gorbenko; Israel	2:12.88; NR	Anja Crevar; Serbia	2:13.98; NR	Cyrielle Duhamel; France	2:14.15
4×100 m freestyle relay	Russia; Elizaveta Klevanovich (55.92); Anastasia Makarova (56.84); Daria Vaskina (57.19); Polina Egorova (55.31)	3:45.26	Brazil; Rafaela Raurich (56.46); Ana Vieira (56.48); Maria Pessanha (56.76); Fernanda de Goeij (57.50)	3:47.20	Japan; Miku Kojima (57.81); Mayuka Yamamoto (55.67); Nagisa Ikemoto (55.76); Shiori Asaba (1:00.03)	3:49.27
4×100 m medley relay	China; Peng Xuwei (1:01.64); Zheng Muyan (1:10.13); Lin Xintong (59.42); Yang Junxuan (53.99)	4:05.18	Australia; Kaylee McKeown (1:01.61); Chelsea Hodges (1:08.83); Michaela Ryan (1:00.12); Abbey Webb (54.90)	4:05.46	Russia; Daria Vaskina (1:02.74); Anastasia Makarova (1:08.63); Polina Egorova (59.50); Elizaveta Klevanovich (55.20)	4:06.07

==== Mixed events ====
Games	Gold		Silver		Bronze	
4×100 m freestyle relay	Russia; Kliment Kolesnikov (48.17); Andrey Minakov (49.60); Polina Egorova (55.71); Elizaveta Klevanovich (55.02); Daniil Markov^{[a]} Vladislav Gerasimenko^{[a]} Daria Vaskina^{[a]} Anastasia Makarova^{[a]}	3:28.50	Brazil; Lucas Peixoto (50.30); Ana Vieira (55.93); André Calvelo (48.66); Rafaela Raurich (55.24)	3:30.13	China; Shen Jiahao (50.83); Hong Jinquan (50.46); Lin Xintong (55.44); Yang Junxuan (53.72)	3:30.45
4×100 m medley relay	China; Wang Guanbin (55.31); Sun Jiajun (1:00.22); Lin Xintong (59.52); Yang Junxuan (54.74); Peng Xuwei^{[a]} Hong Jinquan^{[a]}	3:49.79	Russia; Polina Egorova (1:01.98); Anastasia Makarova (1:10.00); Andrei Minakov (51.63); Kliment Kolesnikov (47.85); Vladislav Gerasimenko^{[a]} Daniil Markov^{[a]} Elizaveta Klevanovich^{[a]}	3:51.46	Japan; Miku Kojima (1:03.74); Taku TaniguchI (1:01.16); Shinnosuke Ishikawa (51.94); Nagisa Ikemoto (54.90); Yu Hanaguruma^{[a]}	3:51.74

^{a} Swimmers who participated in the heats only and received medals.

== Participating nations ==
- Albania (1)
- Algeria (3)
- Antigua and Barbuda (2)
- Argentina (6)
- Armenia (1)
- Aruba (1)
- Australia (8)
- Austria (3)
- Azerbaijan (1)
- Bahamas (2)
- Barbados (2)
- Belarus (4)
- Benin (1)
- Bermuda (2)
- Bosnia and Herzegovina (3)
- Botswana (2)
- Brazil (8)
- British Virgin Islands (1)
- Brunei (2)
- Bulgaria (4)
- Burkina Faso (2)
- Cambodia (1)
- Canada (8)
- Cayman Islands (1)
- Central African Republic (1)
- Chile (4)
- China (8)
- Chinese Taipei (4)
- Colombia (4)
- Comoros (1)
- Republic of the Congo (1)
- Cook Islands (1)
- Costa Rica (2)
- Croatia (4)
- Cyprus (2)
- Czech Republic (4)
- Dominican Republic (1)
- Ecuador (1)
- Egypt (4)
- Equatorial Guinea (2)
- Estonia (4)
- Federated States of Micronesia (1)
- Finland (4)
- France (8)
- Gabon (1)
- The Gambia (1)
- Germany (8)
- Ghana (1)
- Greece (4)
- Grenada (1)
- Guinea (1)
- Guyana (2)
- Honduras (1)
- Hong Kong (4)
- Hungary (8)
- Iceland (3)
- India (2)
- Indonesia (4)
- Iran (1)
- Ireland (3)
- Israel (4)
- Italy (5)
- Jamaica (1)
- Japan (8)
- Jordan (2)
- Kazakhstan (4)
- Kosovo (1)
- Kuwait (1)
- Kyrgyzstan (2)
- Laos (1)
- Latvia (4)
- Lebanon (1)
- Liechtenstein (2)
- Lithuania (4)
- Luxembourg (2)
- Macedonia (1)
- Malawi (2)
- Malaysia (2)
- Maldives (2)
- Mali (1)
- Malta (1)
- Marshall Islands (2)
- Mexico (4)
- Moldova (4)
- Monaco (2)
- Morocco (2)
- Netherlands (3)
- New Zealand (4)
- Niger (1)
- Norway (4)
- Oman (2)
- Palau (2)
- Palestine (2)
- Panama (1)
- Papua New Guinea (1)
- Paraguay (1)
- Peru (3)
- Philippines (1)
- Poland (8)
- Portugal (4)
- Puerto Rico (1)
- Qatar (1)
- Romania (4)
- Russia (8)
- Saint Lucia (1)
- Saint Vincent and the Grenadines (1)
- San Marino (2)
- Saudi Arabia (1)
- Senegal (2)
- Serbia (4)
- Seychelles (2)
- Sierra Leone (1)
- Singapore (4)
- Slovakia (4)
- Slovenia (4)
- South Africa (8)
- South Korea (4)
- Spain (8)
- Sri Lanka (1)
- Sudan (1)
- Suriname (1)
- Eswatini (1)
- Sweden (5)
- Switzerland (4)
- Tajikistan (1)
- Tanzania (2)
- Thailand (3)
- Tonga (1)
- Trinidad and Tobago (1)
- Tunisia (2)
- Turkey (4)
- Ukraine (4)
- United States (8)
- Uruguay (1)
- Uzbekistan (4)
- Venezuela (3)
- Vietnam (3)
- Virgin Islands (2)
- Zambia (1)
- Zimbabwe (1)
