= Ghana at the 2018 Summer Youth Olympics =

- IOC code: GHA
- NOC: Ghana Olympic Committee
- Website: http://www.ghanaolympic.org/

in Buenos Aires, Argentina 6 – 18 October 2018
- Competitors: 5 in 4 sports
- Officials: Evans Yeboah-Chef De Mission & Head, Ghana's Delegation at Multi-Sport Games
- Medals: Gold 0 Silver 0 Bronze 0 Total 0

Summer Youth Olympics appearances
- 2010; 2014; 2018

Ghana participated at the 2018 Summer Youth Olympics in Buenos Aires, Argentina from 6 October to 18 October 2018. The Country delegation team was led by Evans Yeboah.

== Competitors ==
Sport	Boys	Girls	Total
Athletics	1	0	1
Beach volleyball	2	0	2
Swimming	1	0	1
Weightlifting	0	1	1

== Athletics ==
Boys

Athlete	Event	Stage 1		Stage 2		Total	
Athlete	Event	Result	Rank	Result	Rank	Total	Rank
Solomon Diafo	Boys' 400 m	49.08	8	48.47	7	1:37.55	8

== Beach volleyball ==
Athletes	Event	Preliminary round		Round of 24	Round of 16	Quarterfinals	Semifinals	Final / BM	
Athletes	Event	Opposition Score	Rank	Opposition Score	Opposition Score	Opposition Score	Opposition Score	Opposition Score	Rank
Kelvin Carboo; Eric Tsatsu	Boys'	Streli–Hajos (HUN); L 0–2; Lanteri–Palmaro (MON); W 2–1; A. Lezcano–C. Lobo (CRC); L 0–2	3 Q	Amieva–Zelayeta (ARG); L 0–2	did not advance				

== Swimming ==
Boys

Athlete	Event	Heat		Semifinal		Final	
Athlete	Event	Time	Rank	Time	Rank	Time	Rank
Abeiku Jackson	50 m butterfly	24.44	11 Q	24.90	15	did not advance	
Abeiku Jackson	100 m butterfly	54.52	18	did not advance			

== Weightlifting ==
Ghana qualified one athletes based on its performance at the 2018 African Youth Championships.

Athlete	Event	Snatch		Clean & jerk		Total	Rank
Athlete	Event	Result	Rank	Result	Rank	Total	Rank
Sandra Mensimah Owusu	Girls' -58 kg	65	7	77	7	142	7
