= Mozambique at the 2018 Summer Youth Olympics =

- IOC code: MOZ
- NOC: Comité Olímpico Nacional de Moçambique

in Buenos Aires, Argentina 6 – 18 October 2018
- Competitors: 6 in 3 sports
- Medals: Gold 0 Silver 0 Bronze 0 Total 0

Summer Youth Olympics appearances
- 2010; 2014; 2018

Mozambique participated at the 2018 Summer Youth Olympics in Buenos Aires, Argentina from 6 October to 18 October 2018.

== Competitors ==
Sports	Boys	Girls	Total	Events
Athletics	1	0	1	1
Beach volleyball	2	2	4	2
Canoeing	0	1	1	2
Total	3	3	6	5

== Beach volleyball ==
Mozambique had 2 teams; a boys' and a girls'.

Athletes	Event	Preliminary round		Round of 24	Round of 16	Quarterfinals	Semifinals	Final / BM	
Athletes	Event	Opposition Score	Rank	Opposition Score	Opposition Score	Opposition Score	Opposition Score	Opposition Score	Rank
Guvu; Monjane	Boys' tournament	Esther–Namah (MRI); W 2–0; Leon–Jurado (ECU); L 0–2; Santiago–Rivera (PUR); W 2–1	2 Q	Colley–Koita (GAM); W 2–0	de Groot–Immers (NED); L 0–2	did not advance			
Sinaportar; Mucheza	Girls' tournament	Isatu–Iye (SLE); W 2–0; Allcca–Mendoza (PER); L 1–2; Olimstad–Berntsen (NOR); L 0–2	3 Q	Navas–Gonzalez (PUR); L 0–2	did not advance				

== Canoeing ==
Mozambique was given one boat to compete by the tripartite committee.

- Girls' C1 - 1 boat

Athlete	Event	Qualification		Repechage		Round of 16	Quarterfinals	Semifinals	Final / BM	Rank
Athlete	Event	Time	Rank	Time	Rank	Opposition Result	Opposition Result	Opposition Result	Opposition Result	Rank
Lifa Malapane	C1 slalom	DNF		did not advance						
Lifa Malapane	C1 sprint	3:52.31	15	5:23.59	8	Asadbeki (IRI); L 3:53.99	did not advance			
