= The Gambia at the 2018 Summer Youth Olympics =

- IOC code: GAM
- NOC: Gambia National Olympic Committee
- Website: www.gnoc.gm

in Buenos Aires, Argentina 6 – 18 October 2018
- Competitors: 4 in 3 sports
- Medals: Gold 0 Silver 0 Bronze 0 Total 0

Summer Youth Olympics appearances
- 2010; 2014; 2018

The Gambia competed at the 2018 Summer Youth Olympics in Buenos Aires, Argentina from 6 to 18 October 2018.

== Competitors ==
Sport	Boys	Girls	Total
Athletics	1	1	2
Beach volleyball	2	0	2
Swimming	0	1	1

== Beach volleyball ==
Athletes	Event	Preliminary round	Standing	Round of 24	Round of 16	Quarterfinals	Semifinals	Final / BM	Rank
Athletes	Event	Opposition Score	Standing	Opposition Score	Opposition Score	Opposition Score	Opposition Score	Opposition Score	Rank
Colley; Koita	Boys' tournament	Glasgow–Louraine (VIN); W 2–0; John–Pfretzschner (GER); L 0–2; Åhman–Hellvig (SWE); L 0–2	3	Guvu–Monjane (MOZ); L 0–2	did not advance				
