= Mauritius at the 2018 Summer Youth Olympics =

- IOC code: MRI
- NOC: Mauritius Olympic Committee

in Buenos Aires, Argentina 6 – 18 October 2018
- Competitors: 25 in 6 sports
- Medals Ranked 61st: Gold 1 Silver 0 Bronze 0 Total 1

Summer Youth Olympics appearances
- 2010; 2014; 2018

Mauritius participated at the 2018 Summer Youth Olympics in Buenos Aires, Argentina from 6 October to 18 October 2018.

== Medalists ==
Medals awarded to participants of mixed-NOC teams are represented in italics. These medals are not counted towards the individual NOC medal tally.

Medal	Name	Sport	Event	Date
Gold	Terence Benjamin Saramandif	Canoeing	Boys' C1 slalom	15 October
Bronze	Margaux Koenig	Equestrian	Team jumping	9 October

Medals by sport
Sport	1st place, gold medalist(s)	2nd place, silver medalist(s)	3rd place, bronze medalist(s)	Total
Canoeing	1	0	0	1
Total	1	0	0	1

== Archery ==
Individual

Athlete	Event	Ranking round		Round of 32	Round of 16	Quarterfinals	Semifinals	Final / BM	Rank
Athlete	Event	Score	Seed	Opposition Score	Opposition Score	Opposition Score	Opposition Score	Opposition Score	Rank
Louis Gino Aurelien Juhel	Boys' Individual	606	31	Tang (TPE); L 0–6	did not advance				17

Team

Athletes	Event	Ranking round		Round of 32	Round of 16	Quarterfinals	Semifinals	Final / BM	Rank
Athletes	Event	Score	Seed	Opposition Score	Opposition Score	Opposition Score	Opposition Score	Opposition Score	Rank
Louis Gino Aurelien Juhel (MRI); Ruka Uehara (JPN)	Mixed team	1273	30	Kharitonova (RUS); Rezowan (BAN); L 4–5	did not advance				17

== Beach handball ==
Event	Preliminary round						Consolidation round				Placement	Final / BM / PM	
Event	Opposition Score	Opposition Score	Opposition Score	Opposition Score	Opposition Score	Rank	Opposition Score	Opposition Score	Opposition Score	Rank	Opposition Score	Opposition Score	Rank
Boys' tournament	Croatia; L 0-2	Paraguay; W 2–1	Portugal; L 0–2	Argentina; L 1–2	Italy; L 0–2	5	Chinese Taipei; L 0–2	Venezuela; L 0–2	Uruguay; L 0–2	3	Paraguay; L 0–2	did not advance	12
Girls' tournament	Croatia; L 0-2	Hungary; L 0-2	American Samoa; L 0-2	Chinese Taipei; L 0-2	Russia; L 0-2	6	Venezuela; L 0–2	Hong Kong; L 0–2	Turkey; L 0–2	3	American Samoa; L 0-2	did not advance	12

== Beach volleyball ==
Athletes	Event	Preliminary round		Round of 24	Round of 16	Quarterfinals	Semifinals	Final / BM	
Athletes	Event	Opposition Score	Rank	Opposition Score	Opposition Score	Opposition Score	Opposition Score	Opposition Score	Rank
Esther; Namah	Boys' tournament	Guvu–Monjane (MOZ); L 0–2; Leon–Jurado (ECU); L 0–2; Santiago–Rivera (PUR); L 0–2	4	did not advance					

== Canoeing ==
Mauritius qualified one boat based on its performance at the 2018 World Qualification Event.

- Boys' C1 - 1 boat

Athlete	Event	Qualification		Repechage		Quarterfinals	Semifinals	Final / BM	Rank
Athlete	Event	Time	Rank	Time	Rank	Opposition Result	Opposition Result	Opposition Result	Rank
Terence Benjamin Saramandif	Boys' C1 sprint	2:18.14	15	2:10.80	9	did not advance			
Terence Benjamin Saramandif	Boys' C1 slalom	1:19.84	1	Bye		Bakhraddin (KAZ); W 1:18.49	Bernárdez (ESP); W 1:19.02	Anderson (NZL); W 1:18.86	1st place, gold medalist(s)

== Equestrian ==
Mauritius was given a rider to compete from the tripartite committee.

- Individual Jumping - 1 athlete

Athlete	Horse	Event	Round 1		Round 2			Total	
Athlete	Horse	Event	Penalties	Rank	Penalties	Total	Rank	Penalties	Rank
Margaux Koenig	BM Urlefe	Individual Jumping	4	14	0	12	27	16	23
Africa; Margaux Koenig (MRI); Anna Bunty Howard (ZAM); Brianagh Lindsay Clark (ZIM); Ahmed Nasser Elnaggar (EGY); Hannah Ivy Garton (RSA)	BM Urlefe; Call Girl Z El Roblecito Malaika; Jos Africa de Parco; Jos Cassius	Team Jumping	(4); 1; 0 (8); 0	4	(4); 0; 0 (4); 0	1	1	1	3rd place, bronze medalist(s)

== Weightlifting ==
Mauritius was given a quota by the tripartite committee to compete in weightlifting.

Boy

Athlete	Event	Snatch		Clean & Jerk		Total	Rank
Athlete	Event	Result	Rank	Result	Rank	Total	Rank
Jack Dorian Madanamoothoo	−62 kg	92	11	116	10	208	11

Girl

Athlete	Event	Snatch		Clean & jerk		Total	Rank
Athlete	Event	Result	Rank	Result	Rank	Total	Rank
Ketty Lent	−63 kg	75	7	98	7	173	7
