= Indonesia at the 2018 Summer Youth Olympics =

- IOC code: INA
- NOC: Indonesian Olympic Committee

in Buenos Aires, Argentina 6 – 18 October 2018
- Competitors: 17 in 8 sports
- Flag bearer: Ni Putu Eka Febiananda
- Medals Ranked 83rd: Gold 0 Silver 0 Bronze 1 Total 1

Summer Youth Olympics appearances (overview)
- 2010; 2014; 2018; 2026

Indonesia participated at the 2018 Summer Youth Olympics in Buenos Aires, Argentina from 6 October to 18 October 2018.

== Competitors ==
| Sport | Boys | Girls | Total |
|---|---|---|---|
| Athletics | 1 | 1 | 2 |
| Badminton | 1 | 1 | 2 |
| Basketball | 0 | 4 | 4 |
| Beach Volleyball | 2 | 0 | 2 |
| Golf | 0 | 1 | 1 |
| Shooting | 1 | 0 | 1 |
| Swimming | 2 | 2 | 4 |
| Weightlifting | 0 | 1 | 1 |
| Total | 7 | 10 | 17 |

== Medals ==
Medals awarded to participants of mixed-NOC (Combined) teams are represented in italics. These medals are not counted towards the individual NOC medal tally.

| Medal | Name | Sport | Event | Date |
|---|---|---|---|---|
| Bronze | Nur Vinatasari | Weightlifting | Girls' −53kg | 9 Oct |

== Badminton ==
Indonesia qualified one player based on the Badminton Junior World Rankings. A second player also qualified, but the quota was declined Indonesia later gained another girls' spot after reallocation.

| Athlete | Event | Group Stage | | | | Quarterfinals | Semifinals | Final / BM | |
| Athlete | Event | Opposition Score | Opposition Score | Opposition Score | Rank | Opposition Score | Opposition Score | Opposition Score | Rank |
|---|---|---|---|---|---|---|---|---|---|
| Ikhsan Rumbay | Boys' singles | Nguyễn Hải Đăng (VIE); W 2–0 | Dennis Koppen (NED); W 2–0 | Alonso Medel (CHI); W 2–0 | 1 | Lakshya Sen (IND); L 0–2 | did not advance | | 5 |
| Maharani Sekar Batari | Girls' singles | Goh Jin Wei (MAS); L 0–2 | Ann-Kathrin Spöri (GER); W 2–0 | Ashwathi Pillai (SWE); W 2–1 | 2 | did not advance | | | 9 |

Team

| Athlete | Event | Group stage | | | | Quarterfinal | Semifinal | Final / BM | Rank |
| Athlete | Event | Opposition Score | Opposition Score | Opposition Score | Rank | Opposition Score | Opposition Score | Opposition Score | Rank |
|---|---|---|---|---|---|---|---|---|---|
| Team Sigma; Ikhsan Rumbay (INA); Dennis Koppen (NED); Rukesh Maharjan (NEP); Cristian Savin (MDA); Madeleine Caren Akoumba Ze (CMR); Grace King (GBR); Ann-Kathrin Spöri (GER); Wang Zhiyi (CHN) | Mixed Teams | Theta (MIX); W (110–100) | Gamma (MIX); W (110–86) | Omega (MIX); L (98–110) | 2Q | Zeta (MIX); L (106–110) | did not advance | | 5 |
| Team Zeta; Maharani Sekar Batari (INA); Danylo Bosniuk (UKR); Christopher Grimley (GBR); Kettiya Keoxay (LAO); Nhat Nguyen (IRL); Jaslyn Hooi (SGP); Nairoby Abigail Jiménez (DOM); Vivien Sándorházi (HUN) | Mixed Teams | Delta (MIX); L (95–110) | Epsilon (MIX); W (110–89) | Alpha (MIX); L (103–110) | 3Q | Sigma (MIX); W (110–106) | Omega (MIX); L (109–110) | Theta (MIX); L (107–110) | 4 |

== Basketball ==
Indonesia qualified a girls' team based on the U18 3x3 National Federation Ranking.

- Girls' tournament – 1 team of 4 athletes

| Event | Group stage | | | | | Quarterfinal | Semifinal | Final / BM | |
| Event | Opposition Score | Opposition Score | Opposition Score | Opposition Score | Rank | Opposition Score | Opposition Score | Opposition Score | Rank |
|---|---|---|---|---|---|---|---|---|---|
| Girls' tournament | Mexico; L 14–17 | Argentina; L 11–21 | Andorra; W 16–15 | France; L 22–12 | 4 | did not advance | | | |

Shoot-out contest

| Athlete | Event | Qualification | | Final | | | | | |
| Athlete | Event | Points | Rank | Round 1 | Round 2 | Round 3 | Round 4 | Total | Rank |
|---|---|---|---|---|---|---|---|---|---|
| Nathania Orville | Shoot-out contest | 5 | 8 | did not advance | | | | | |

== Beach volleyball ==
Indonesia qualified one team based on its performance at the 2018 Asian U19 Championship.

- Boys' tournament – 1 team of 2 athletes

| Athlete | Event | Group stage | | Round of 24 | Round of 16 | Quarterfinal | Semifinal | Final / BM | Rank |
| Athlete | Event | Opposition Score | Rank | Opposition Score | Opposition Score | Opposition Score | Opposition Score | Opposition Score | Rank |
|---|---|---|---|---|---|---|---|---|---|
| Bintang–Danang | Boys' tournament | Brewster–Schwengel (USA); W 2-0; Gabo–Osório (VEN); W 2-0; Railbiently–Brian (ARU); W 2-0 | 1 | Bye | Åhman–Hellvig (SWE); L 0-2 | did not advance | | | |

== Golf ==
Individual

| Athlete | Event | Round 1 | | Round 2 | | | Round 3 | | | Total | | |
| Athlete | Event | Score | Rank | Score | Total | Rank | Score | Total | Rank | Score | Par | Rank |
|---|---|---|---|---|---|---|---|---|---|---|---|---|
| Ribka Vania | Girls' Individual | 74 (+4) | 10 | 75 (+5) | 149 | 15 | 76 (+6) | 225 | 19 | 225 | +15 | 16 |

Team

| Athletes | Event | Round 1 (Fourball) | | Round 2 (Foursome) | | Round 3 (Individual Stroke) | | | | Total | | |
| Athletes | Event | Score | Rank | Score | Rank | Girl | Boy | Total | Rank | Score | Par | Rank |
|---|---|---|---|---|---|---|---|---|---|---|---|---|
| Ribka Vania (INA); Park Sangha (KOR) | Mixed team | 66 (−4) | 16 | 69 (−1) | 2 | 75 | 73 | 148 (+8) | 16 | 283 | +3 | 8 |

== Shooting ==
Individual

| Athlete | Event | Qualification | | Final | |
| Athlete | Event | Points | Rank | Points | Rank |
|---|---|---|---|---|---|
| Muhammad Naufal Mahardika | Boys' 10 m air rifle | 616.2 | 14 | did not advance | |

Team

| Athlete | Event | Qualification | | Round of 16 | Quarterfinal | Semifinal | Final | |
| Athlete | Event | Points | Rank | Opposition Score | Opposition Score | Opposition Score | Opposition Score | Rank |
|---|---|---|---|---|---|---|---|---|
| Sofia Benetti (ITA); Muhammad Naufal Mahardika (INA) | Mixed 10 metre air rifle | 820.5 | 12 | Darwish (EGY); Hoberg (AUS); W 10-9 | Kemppi (FIN); Firmapaz (ARG); L 5-10 | did not advance | | |

== Weightlifting ==
Indonesia qualified two lifters (one boy and one girl) based on its performance at the 2017 World Championships.

| Athlete | Event | Snatch | | Clean & jerk | | Total | Rank |
| Athlete | Event | Result | Rank | Result | Rank | Total | Rank |
|---|---|---|---|---|---|---|---|
| Nur Vinatasari | Girls' 53 kg | 72 | 2 | 90 | 2 | 162 | 3rd place, bronze medalist(s) |
| Albin Andrean Putra | Boys' | DNS | | | | | |
