= Togo at the 2018 Summer Youth Olympics =

- IOC code: TOG
- NOC: Comité National Olympique Togolais

in Buenos Aires, Argentina 6 – 18 October 2018
- Competitors: 4
- Medals: Gold 0 Silver 0 Bronze 0 Total 0

Summer Youth Olympics appearances
- 2010; 2014; 2018

Togo participated at the 2018 Summer Youth Olympics in Buenos Aires, Argentina from 6 October to 18 October 2018.

== Beach volleyball ==
Togo had 1 team.

| Athletes | Event | Preliminary round | | Round of 24 | Round of 16 | Quarterfinals | Semifinals | Final / BM | |
| Athletes | Event | Opposition Score | Rank | Opposition Score | Opposition Score | Opposition Score | Opposition Score | Opposition Score | Rank |
|---|---|---|---|---|---|---|---|---|---|
| Krovon; Ariyata | Boys' tournament | Jorge–Gonza (PAR); L 0–2; Ayon–Alayo (CUB); L 0–2; J Bello–Bello (GBR); L 0–2 | 4 | did not advance | | | | | |

== Fencing ==
Togo was given a quota to compete by the tripartite committee.

- Girls' Foil - 1 quota
