= Sweden at the 2018 Summer Youth Olympics =

- IOC code: SWE
- NOC: Swedish Olympic Committee

in Buenos Aires, Argentina
- Competitors: 18 in 10 sports
- Flag bearer: Ludvig Eriksson
- Medals Ranked 23rd: Gold 3 Silver 2 Bronze 1 Total 6

Summer Youth Olympics appearances (overview)
- 2010; 2014; 2018; 2026

Sweden participated at the 2018 Summer Youth Olympics in Buenos Aires from 6 to 18 October 2018. 18 athletes competed for the country at the games.

== Medalists ==
Medal	Name	Sport	Event	Date
Gold	Sara Junevik	Swimming	Girls' 50 m butterfly	10 October
Gold	Jonna Malmgren	Wrestling	Girls' freestyle 49 kg	13 October
Gold	Jonatan Hellvig; David Åhman	Beach volleyball	Boys' tournament	17 October
Silver	Robin Hanson	Swimming	Boys' 200 m freestyle	8 October
Silver	Elin Lindroth	Rowing	Girls' single sculls	10 October
Bronze	Robin Hanson	Swimming	Boys' 100 m freestyle	12 October

=== Medalists in mixed NOCs events ===
Medal	Name	Sport	Event	Date
Gold	Ashwathi Pillai	Badminton	Mixed team	12 October
Bronze	Tonya Paulsson	Gymnastics	Mixed multi-discipline team	10 October

== Badminton ==
Sweden qualified one player based on the Badminton Junior World Rankings.

Singles

Athlete	Event	Group stage				Quarterfinal	Semifinal	Final / BM	Rank
Athlete	Event	Opposition Score	Opposition Score	Opposition Score	Rank	Opposition Score	Opposition Score	Opposition Score	Rank
Ashwathi Pillai	Girls' singles	Spöri (GER); L 1–2	Goh JW (MAS); L 0–2	Batari (INA); L 1–2	4	did not advance			9

Team

Athlete	Event	Group stage				Quarterfinal	Semifinal	Final / BM	Rank
Athlete	Event	Opposition Score	Opposition Score	Opposition Score	Rank	Opposition Score	Opposition Score	Opposition Score	Rank
Team Alpha; Ashwathi Pillai (SWE); Lakshya Sen (IND); Giovanni Toti (ITA); Vannthoun Vath (CAM); Hasani Nusaka Ambalangodage (SRI); Maria Delcheva (BUL); Jennie Gai (USA)	Mixed teams	Team Epsilon (MIX); W 110–98	Team Delta (MIX); L 99–110	Team Zeta (MIX); W 110–103	2 Q	Team Gamma (MIX); W 110–94	Team Theta (MIX); W 110–90	Team Omega (MIX); W 110–106	1st place, gold medalist(s)

== Beach volleyball ==
Sweden qualified a boys' team based on their performance at 2017-18 European Youth Continental Cup Final.

Athletes	Event	Group stage				Round of 24	Round of 16	Quarterfinals	Semifinals	Final / BM	Rank
Athletes	Event	Opposition Score	Opposition Score	Opposition Score	Rank	Opposition Score	Opposition Score	Opposition Score	Opposition Score	Opposition Score	Rank
Jonatan Hellvig; David Åhman	Boys' tournament	Pfretzschner/ John (GER); L 1–2	Louraine/ Glasgow (VIN); W 2–0	Colley/ Koita (GAM); W 2–0	2 Q	Riveros/ Gonzalo (PAR); W 2–1	Bintang/ Danang (INA); W 2–0	Pfretzschner/ John (GER); W 2–0	Streli/ Hajós (HUN); W 2–0	de Groot/ Immers (NED); W 2–0	1st place, gold medalist(s)

== Golf ==
Individual

Athlete	Event	Round 1	Round 2	Round 3	Total		
Athlete	Event	Score	Score	Score	Score	Par	Rank
Ludvig Eriksson	Boys	81 (+11)	76 (+6)	79 (+9)	236	+26	=26
Amanda Linnér	Girls	84 (+14)	83 (+13)	79 (+9)	246	+36	30

Team

Athletes	Event	Round 1 (Foursome)	Round 2 (Fourball)	Round 3 (Individual Stroke)			Total	
Athletes	Event	Score	Score	Boy	Girl	Total	Score	Rank
Ludvig Eriksson; Amanda Linnér	Mixed	65 (–5)	79 (+9)	73 (+3)	78 (+8)	151 (+11)	295	=23

== Gymnastics ==
=== Artistic ===
Sweden qualified two gymnasts based on its performance at the 2018 European Junior Championship.

Boys

Athlete	Event	Qualification								Final							
Athlete	Event	Apparatus						Total	Rank	Apparatus						Total	Rank
Athlete	Event	F	PH	R	V	PB	HB	Total	Rank	F	PH	R	V	PB	HB	Total	Rank
Marcus Stenberg	All-around	13.200 (12)	11.300 (23)	12.566 (16)	12.966 (–)	12.110 (26)	12.333 (15)	74.432	16 Q	12.233	11.266	12.133	12.900	10.033	12.033	70.598	17

Girls

Athlete	Event	Qualification						Final					
Athlete	Event	Apparatus				Total	Rank	Apparatus				Total	Rank
Athlete	Event	F	V	UB	BB	Total	Rank	F	V	UB	BB	Total	Rank
Tonya Paulsson	All-around	10.966 (32)	12.633 (–)	12.733 (8)	11.800 (13)	48.132	12 Q	12.833	12.500	11.833	12.233	49.399	7
Tonya Paulsson	Uneven bars	—N/a		12.733	—N/a	12.733	8 Q	—N/a		12.800	—N/a	12.800	7

=== Multi-discipline ===
Athlete	Event	Discipline				Total	Rank
Athlete	Event	ACR	AG	RG	TRA	Total	Rank
Team Dong Dong; Marcus Stenberg (SWE); Rachel Nell (RSA); Sidwell Madibeng (RSA); Daniel Schwed (GER); Diogo Soares (BRA); Beatriz Cardoso (POR); Ana-Maria Puiu (ROU); Lee Yunseo (KOR); Aurora Arvelo (FIN); Khrystyna Pohranychna (UKR); Wang Zilu (CHN); Nikita Babyonishev (UZB); Yekaterina Lukina (KAZ)	Multi-discipline team	33	245	72	39	389	5
Team Oksana Chusovitina; Tonya Paulsson (SWE); Viktoriya Akhotnikava (BLR); Ilya Famenkou (BLR); Brandon Briones (USA); Adam Tobin (GBR); Mohamed Afify (EGY); Indira Ulmasova (UZB); Karla Pérez (GUA); Lidiia Iakovleva (AUS); Aino Yamada (JPN); Lilly Rotärmel (GER); Santiago Escallier (ARG); Antonia Sakellaridou (GRE)	Multi-discipline team	12	202	100	38	352	3rd place, bronze medalist(s)

== Rowing ==
Sweden qualified one boat based on its performance at the 2017 World Rowing Junior Championships.

Athlete	Event	Time trial		Heats						Quarterfinals		Semifinals		Final	
Athlete	Event	Time trial		Round 1		Round 2		Points	Rank	Quarterfinals		Semifinals		Final	
Athlete	Event	Time	Rank	Time	Rank	Time	Rank	Points	Rank	Time	Rank	Time	Rank	Time	Rank
Elin Lindroth	Girls' single sculls	3:53.81	2	1:55.60	2	1:55.65	3	7	13 Q	1:45.07	1 S A/B	1:46.80	1 FA	1:44.31	2nd place, silver medalist(s)

== Swimming ==
Sweden had eligibility to send a total of eight swimmers to the games after finishing among the top sixteen teams at the 2017 World Aquatics Championships.

Boys

Athlete	Event	Heat		Semifinal		Final	
Athlete	Event	Time	Rank	Time	Rank	Time	Rank
Robin Hanson	50 m freestyle	22.85	4 Q	22.93	8 Q	22.96	7
Robin Hanson	100 m freestyle	50.99	12 Q	50.17	5 Q	49.86	3rd place, bronze medalist(s)
Robin Hanson	200 m freestyle	1:49.86	6 Q	—N/a		1:48.14	2nd place, silver medalist(s)
Robin Hanson	400 m freestyle	3:53.71	11	—N/a		did not advance	
Robin Hanson	50 m butterfly	24.63	15 Q	25.35	16	did not advance	
Robin Hanson	200 m butterfly	did not start		—N/a		did not advance	
Björn Seeliger	50 m freestyle	22.84	3 Q	22.71	=5 Q	22.77	5
Björn Seeliger	100 m freestyle	51.99	26	did not advance			
Björn Seeliger	100 m backstroke	did not start		did not advance			

Girls

Athlete	Event	Heat		Semifinal		Final	
Athlete	Event	Time	Rank	Time	Rank	Time	Rank
Hannah Brunzell	50 m breaststroke	31.81	=3 Q	32.34	10	did not advance	
Hannah Brunzell	100 m breaststroke	1:10.10	7 Q	1:09.46	5 Q	1:09.20	6
Hannah Brunzell	200 m breaststroke	2:32.34	11	—N/a		did not advance	
Hannah Brunzell	200 m individual medley	2:21.90	25	—N/a		did not advance	
Sara Junevik	50 m freestyle	27.16	28	did not advance			
Sara Junevik	100 m freestyle	58.42	31	did not advance			
Sara Junevik	50 m backstroke	30.64	29	did not advance			
Sara Junevik	50 m butterfly	26.91	4 Q	26.75	3 Q	26.40	1st place, gold medalist(s)
Sara Junevik	100 m butterfly	1:01.50	9 Q	1:00.85	7 Q	1:00.41	5
Julia Månsson	50 m breaststroke	32.86	17	did not advance			
Julia Månsson	100 m breaststroke	1:10.91	12 Q	1:10.60	12	did not advance	
Julia Månsson	200 m breaststroke	2:32.99	15	—N/a		did not advance	

Mixed

Athlete	Event	Heat		Final	
Athlete	Event	Time	Rank	Time	Rank
Björn Seeliger; Hannah Brunzell; Sara Junevik; Robin Hanson	4x100 m medley relay	3:59.12	11	did not advance	

== Table tennis ==
Singles

Athlete	Event	Group stage				Round of 16	Quarterfinal	Semifinal	Final / BM	Rank
Athlete	Event	Opposition Score	Opposition Score	Opposition Score	Rank	Opposition Score	Opposition Score	Opposition Score	Opposition Score	Rank
Truls Möregårdh	Boys' singles	Betancor (ARG); W 4–1	Mutti (ITA); W 4–1	Kim S-g (PRK); W 4–1	1 Q	Abdel-Aziz (EGY); W 4–2	Wang Cq (CHN); L 1–4	did not advance		=5

Team

Athlete	Event	Group stage				Round of 16	Quarterfinal	Semifinal	Final / BM	Rank
Athlete	Event	Opposition Score	Opposition Score	Opposition Score	Rank	Opposition Score	Opposition Score	Opposition Score	Opposition Score	Rank
Truls Möregårdh (SWE); Sabina Šurjan (SRB)	Mixed team	Stankevičius/ Blašková (MIX); W 3–0	Kolodziejczyk/ Węgrzyn (MIX); W 3–0	Pyon S-g/ Kim S-g (PRK); W 2–1	1 Q	Mutti/ Laurenti (ITA); W 2–0	Ursu/ Vovk (MIX); W 2–0	Harimoto/ Hirano (JPN); L 1–2	Lin Y-j/ Su P-l (TPE); L 1–2	4

== Taekwondo ==
Girls

Athlete	Event	Round of 16	Quarterfinals	Semifinals	Final	Rank
Athlete	Event	Opposition Result	Opposition Result	Opposition Result	Opposition Result	Rank
Rim Bayaa	49 kg	Kaiyrzhankyzy (KAZ); W DSQ	Zolotic (USA); L 17–22	did not advance		=5

== Triathlon ==
Sweden qualified one athlete based on its performance at the 2018 European Youth Olympic Games Qualifier.

Individual

Athlete	Event	Swim (750m)	Trans 1	Bike (20 km)	Trans 2	Run (5 km)	Total Time	Rank
Andreas Carlsson	Boys' individual	9:34	0:33	27:32	0:26	15:48	53:53	4

Relay

Athlete	Event	Lap 1	Lap 2	Lap 3	Lap 4	Total	Rank
Andreas Carlsson (SWE); Baptiste Passemard (FRA); Eva Daniels (LUX); Barbara de Koning (NED)	Mixed relay	22:24	did not finish				

== Wrestling ==
Girls' freestyle

Athlete	Event	Group stage					Final / RM	Rank
Athlete	Event	Opposition Score	Opposition Score	Opposition Score	Opposition Score	Rank	Opposition Score	Rank
Jonna Malmgren	49 kg	Duenas (GUM); W 5–0	Ech-Chabki (MAR); W 5–0	Szenttamasi (HUN); W 5–0	Sim (CAM); W 5–0	1 Q/1–2	Akhmedova (UZB); W 5–0	1st place, gold medalist(s)
Julia Fridlund	73 kg	Marín Potrille (CUB); L 0–3	Kagami (JPN); L 1–4	White (CAN); W 5–0	Ludgate (ASA); W 5–0	3 Q/5–6	Oknazarova (UZB); W 5–0	5
