= Beach volleyball at the 2018 Summer Youth Olympics – Boys' tournament =

Boys' tournament at the III Summer Youth Olympic Games
- Venue: Parque Tres de Febrero
- Date: October 7 – 17
- Competitors: 64 from 32 nations

Medalists
| 1st place, gold medalist(s) | | David Åhman; Jonatan Hellvig | Sweden |
| 2nd place, silver medalist(s) | | Yorick de Groot; Matthew Immers | Netherlands |
| 3rd place, bronze medalist(s) | | Bautista Amieva; Mauro Zelayeta | Argentina |

These are the results for the boys' tournament event at the 2018 Summer Youth Olympics.

== Results ==
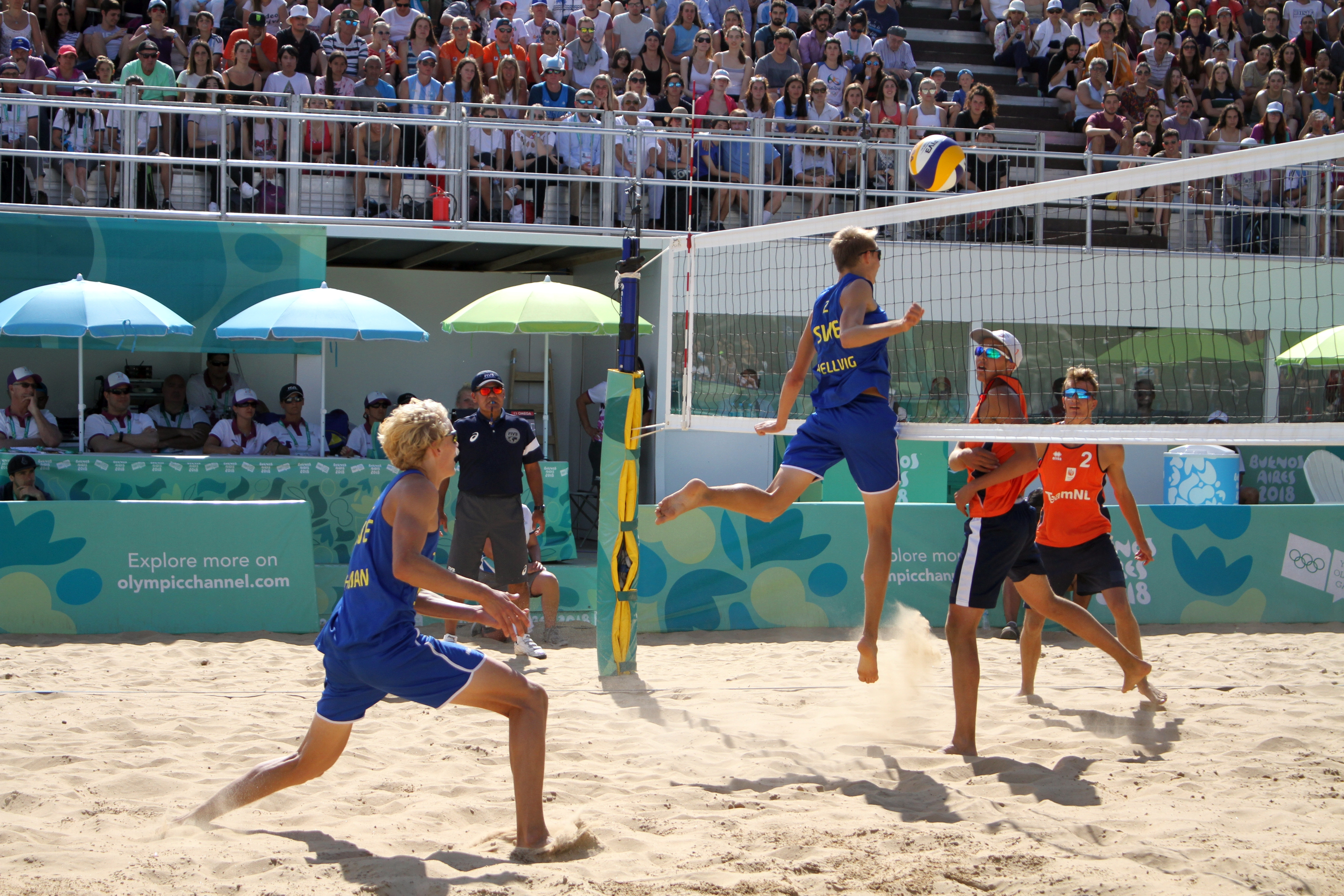
Netherlands Vs Sweden in the final match

=== Preliminary round ===
==== Pool A ====
| Pos | Team | Pld | W | L | Pts | SW | SL | SR | SPW | SPL | SPR | Qualification |
|---|---|---|---|---|---|---|---|---|---|---|---|---|
| 1 | Gysin–Broch (SUI) | 3 | 3 | 0 | 6 | 6 | 1 | 6.000 | 143 | 118 | 1.212 | Round of 16 |
| 2 | Amieva–Zelayeta (ARG) | 3 | 2 | 1 | 5 | 5 | 2 | 2.500 | 140 | 130 | 1.077 | Round of 24 |
| 3 | N Phichakon–T Phanupong (THA) | 3 | 1 | 2 | 4 | 2 | 5 | 0.400 | 125 | 135 | 0.926 | Round of 24 |
| 4 | Manas–Sedlák (CZE) | 3 | 0 | 3 | 3 | 1 | 6 | 0.167 | 115 | 140 | 0.821 | |

| Date | Time | | Score | | Set 1 | Set 2 | Set 3 | Total | Report |
|---|---|---|---|---|---|---|---|---|---|
| 8 Oct | 15:00 | N Phichakon–T Phanupong (THA) | 2–1 | Manas–Sedlák (CZE) | 21–15 | 19–21 | 16–14 | 56–50 | |
| 8 Oct | 16:00 | Amieva–Zelayeta (ARG) | 1–2 | Gysin–Broch (SUI) | 22–20 | 22–24 | 11–15 | 55–59 | |
| 10 Oct | 9:00 | N Phichakon–T Phanupong (THA) | 0–2 | Gysin–Broch (SUI) | 12–21 | 18–21 | | 30–42 | |
| 10 Oct | 16:00 | Amieva–Zelayeta (ARG) | 2–0 | Manas–Sedlák (CZE) | 21–17 | 21–15 | | 42–32 | |
| 12 Oct | 11:00 | Manas–Sedlák (CZE) | 0–2 | Gysin–Broch (SUI) | 14–21 | 19–21 | | 33–42 | |
| 12 Oct | 16:00 | Amieva–Zelayeta (ARG) | 2–0 | N Phichakon–T Phanupong (THA) | 21–19 | 22–20 | | 43–39 | |

==== Pool B ====
| Pos | Team | Pld | W | L | Pts | SW | SL | SR | SPW | SPL | SPR | Qualification |
|---|---|---|---|---|---|---|---|---|---|---|---|---|
| 1 | Veretiuk–Shekunov (RUS) | 3 | 3 | 0 | 6 | 6 | 0 | MAX | 133 | 99 | 1.343 | Round of 16 |
| 2 | Poznański–Miszczuk (POL) | 3 | 2 | 1 | 5 | 4 | 2 | 2.000 | 123 | 109 | 1.128 | Round of 24 |
| 3 | Lammel–Droguett (CHI) | 3 | 1 | 2 | 4 | 2 | 4 | 0.500 | 110 | 107 | 1.028 | Round of 24 |
| 4 | Jeffrey–Joe (NZL) | 3 | 0 | 3 | 3 | 0 | 6 | 0.000 | 75 | 126 | 0.595 | |

| Date | Time | | Score | | Set 1 | Set 2 | Set 3 | Total | Report |
|---|---|---|---|---|---|---|---|---|---|
| 7 Oct | 15:00 | Lammel–Droguett (CHI) | 2–0 | Jeffrey–Joe (NZL) | 21–10 | 21–12 | | 42–22 | |
| 7 Oct | 16:00 | Veretiuk–Shekunov (RUS) | 2–0 | Poznański–Miszczuk (POL) | 21–12 | 28–26 | | 49–38 | |
| 9 Oct | 9:00 | Veretiuk–Shekunov (RUS) | 2–0 | Jeffrey–Joe (NZL) | 21–14 | 21–17 | | 42–31 | |
| 9 Oct | 10:00 | Lammel–Droguett (CHI) | 0–2 | Poznański–Miszczuk (POL) | 18–21 | 20–22 | | 38–43 | |
| 11 Oct | 11:00 | Jeffrey–Joe (NZL) | 0–2 | Poznański–Miszczuk (POL) | 13–21 | 9–21 | | 22–42 | |
| 11 Oct | 12:00 | Veretiuk–Shekunov (RUS) | 2–0 | Lammel–Droguett (CHI) | 21–14 | 21–16 | | 42–30 | |

==== Pool C ====
| Pos | Team | Pld | W | L | Pts | SW | SL | SR | SPW | SPL | SPR | Qualification |
|---|---|---|---|---|---|---|---|---|---|---|---|---|
| 1 | John–Pfretzschner (GER) | 3 | 3 | 0 | 6 | 6 | 1 | 6.000 | 137 | 83 | 1.651 | Round of 16 |
| 2 | Åhman–Hellvig (SWE) | 3 | 2 | 1 | 5 | 5 | 2 | 2.500 | 132 | 86 | 1.535 | Round of 24 |
| 3 | Colley–Koita (GAM) | 3 | 1 | 2 | 4 | 2 | 4 | 0.500 | 90 | 122 | 0.738 | Round of 24 |
| 4 | Glasgow–Louraine (VIN) | 3 | 0 | 3 | 3 | 0 | 6 | 0.000 | 58 | 126 | 0.460 | |

| Date | Time | | Score | | Set 1 | Set 2 | Set 3 | Total | Report |
|---|---|---|---|---|---|---|---|---|---|
| 7 Oct | 13:00 | Colley–Koita (GAM) | 2–0 | Glasgow–Louraine (VIN) | 21–19 | 21–19 | | 42–38 | |
| 7 Oct | 14:00 | Åhman–Hellvig (SWE) | 1 –2 | John–Pfretzschner (GER) | 21–17 | 18–21 | 9–15 | 48–53 | |
| 9 Oct | 11:00 | Åhman–Hellvig (SWE) | 2–0 | Glasgow–Louraine (VIN) | 21–2 | 21–6 | | 42–8 | |
| 9 Oct | 12:00 | Colley–Koita (GAM) | 0–2 | John–Pfretzschner (GER) | 15–21 | 8–21 | | 23–42 | |
| 11 Oct | 13:00 | Åhman–Hellvig (SWE) | 2–0 | Colley–Koita (GAM) | 21–13 | 21–12 | | 42–25 | |
| 11 Oct | 14:00 | Glasgow–Louraine (VIN) | 0–2 | John–Pfretzschner (GER) | 3–21 | 9–21 | | 12–42 | |

==== Pool D ====
| Pos | Team | Pld | W | L | Pts | SW | SL | SR | SPW | SPL | SPR | Qualification |
|---|---|---|---|---|---|---|---|---|---|---|---|---|
| 1 | Leon–Jurado (ECU) | 3 | 3 | 0 | 6 | 6 | 1 | 6.000 | 137 | 102 | 1.343 | Round of 16 |
| 2 | Guvu–Monjane (MOZ) | 3 | 2 | 1 | 5 | 4 | 3 | 1.333 | 126 | 109 | 1.156 | Round of 24 |
| 3 | Santiago–Rivera (PUR) | 3 | 1 | 2 | 4 | 4 | 4 | 1.000 | 145 | 123 | 1.179 | Round of 24 |
| 4 | Esther–Namah (MRI) | 3 | 0 | 3 | 3 | 0 | 6 | 0.000 | 52 | 126 | 0.413 | |

| Date | Time | | Score | | Set 1 | Set 2 | Set 3 | Total | Report |
|---|---|---|---|---|---|---|---|---|---|
| 8 Oct | 13:00 | Santiago–Rivera (PUR) | 1–2 | Leon–Jurado (ECU) | 21–17 | 18–21 | 13–15 | 52–53 | |
| 8 Oct | 14:00 | Guvu–Monjane (MOZ) | 2–0 | Esther–Namah (MRI) | 21–10 | 21–6 | | 42–16 | |
| 10 Oct | 10:00 | Guvu–Monjane (MOZ) | 0–2 | Leon–Jurado (ECU) | 17–21 | 16–21 | | 33–42 | |
| 10 Oct | 11:00 | Santiago–Rivera (PUR) | 2–0 | Esther–Namah (MRI) | 21–10 | 21–9 | | 42–19 | |
| 12 Oct | 9:00 | Leon–Jurado (ECU) | 2–0 | Esther–Namah (MRI) | 21–11 | 21–6 | | 42–17 | |
| 12 Oct | 10:00 | Guvu–Monjane (MOZ) | 2–1 | Santiago–Rivera (PUR) | 15–21 | 21–19 | 15–11 | 51–51 | |

==== Pool E ====
| Pos | Team | Pld | W | L | Pts | SW | SL | SR | SPW | SPL | SPR | Qualification |
|---|---|---|---|---|---|---|---|---|---|---|---|---|
| 1 | J Bello–Bello (GBR) | 3 | 3 | 0 | 6 | 6 | 1 | 6.000 | 139 | 88 | 1.580 | Round of 16 |
| 2 | Ayon–Alayo (CUB) | 3 | 2 | 1 | 5 | 5 | 2 | 2.500 | 125 | 111 | 1.126 | Round of 24 |
| 3 | Jorge–Gonza (PAR) | 3 | 1 | 2 | 4 | 2 | 4 | 0.500 | 110 | 102 | 1.078 | Round of 24 |
| 4 | Krovon–Ariyata (TOG) | 3 | 0 | 3 | 3 | 0 | 6 | 0.000 | 53 | 126 | 0.421 | |

| Date | Time | | Score | | Set 1 | Set 2 | Set 3 | Total | Report |
|---|---|---|---|---|---|---|---|---|---|
| 8 Oct | 11:00 | Ayon–Alayo (CUB) | 1–2 | J Bello–Bello (GBR) | 21–19 | 12–21 | 8–15 | 41–55 | |
| 8 Oct | 12:00 | Jorge–Gonza (PAR) | 2–0 | Krovon–Ariyata (TOG) | 21–6 | 21–12 | | 42–18 | |
| 10 Oct | 13:00 | Jorge–Gonza (PAR) | 0–2 | J Bello–Bello (GBR) | 17–21 | 13–21 | | 30–42 | |
| 10 Oct | 14:00 | Ayon–Alayo (CUB) | 2–0 | Krovon–Ariyata (TOG) | 21–9 | 21–9 | | 42–18 | |
| 12 Oct | 12:00 | J Bello–Bello (GBR) | 2–0 | Krovon–Ariyata (TOG) | 21–7 | 21–10 | | 42–17 | |
| 12 Oct | 13:00 | Jorge–Gonza (PAR) | 0–2 | Ayon–Alayo (CUB) | 19–21 | 19–21 | | 38–42 | |

==== Pool F ====
| Pos | Team | Pld | W | L | Pts | SW | SL | SR | SPW | SPL | SPR | Qualification |
|---|---|---|---|---|---|---|---|---|---|---|---|---|
| 1 | Bintang–Danang (INA) | 3 | 3 | 0 | 6 | 6 | 0 | MAX | 128 | 97 | 1.320 | Round of 16 |
| 2 | Brewster–Schwengel (USA) | 3 | 2 | 1 | 5 | 4 | 2 | 2.000 | 123 | 103 | 1.194 | Round of 24 |
| 3 | Gabo–Osório (VEN) | 3 | 1 | 2 | 4 | 2 | 4 | 0.500 | 98 | 110 | 0.891 | Round of 24 |
| 4 | Railbiently–Brian (ARU) | 3 | 0 | 3 | 3 | 0 | 6 | 0.000 | 87 | 126 | 0.690 | |

| Date | Time | | Score | | Set 1 | Set 2 | Set 3 | Total | Report |
|---|---|---|---|---|---|---|---|---|---|
| 7 Oct | 11:00 | Gabo–Osório (VEN) | 2–0 | Railbiently–Brian (ARU) | 21–12 | 21–14 | | 42–26 | |
| 7 Oct | 12:00 | Bintang–Danang (INA) | 2–0 | Brewster–Schwengel (USA) | 23–21 | 21–18 | | 44–39 | |
| 9 Oct | 13:00 | Bintang–Danang (INA) | 2–0 | Railbiently–Brian (ARU) | 21–17 | 21–16 | | 42–33 | |
| 9 Oct | 14:00 | Gabo–Osório (VEN) | 0–2 | Brewster–Schwengel (USA) | 13–21 | 18–21 | | 31–42 | |
| 11 Oct | 10:00 | Bintang–Danang (INA) | 2–0 | Gabo–Osório (VEN) | 21–14 | 21–11 | | 42–25 | |
| 11 Oct | 15:00 | Railbiently–Brian (ARU) | 0–2 | Brewster–Schwengel (USA) | 15–21 | 13–21 | | 28–42 | |

==== Pool G ====
| Pos | Team | Pld | W | L | Pts | SW | SL | SR | SPW | SPL | SPR | Qualification |
|---|---|---|---|---|---|---|---|---|---|---|---|---|
| 1 | Streli–Hajós (HUN) | 3 | 3 | 0 | 6 | 6 | 0 | MAX | 126 | 74 | 1.703 | Round of 16 |
| 2 | A Lezcano–C Lobo (CRC) | 3 | 2 | 1 | 5 | 4 | 2 | 2.000 | 115 | 104 | 1.106 | Round of 24 |
| 3 | Carboo–Tsatsu (GHA) | 3 | 1 | 2 | 4 | 2 | 5 | 0.400 | 112 | 127 | 0.882 | Round of 24 |
| 4 | Lanteri–Palmaro (MON) | 3 | 0 | 3 | 3 | 1 | 6 | 0.167 | 90 | 138 | 0.652 | |

| Date | Time | | Score | | Set 1 | Set 2 | Set 3 | Total | Report |
|---|---|---|---|---|---|---|---|---|---|
| 7 Oct | 9:00 | Carboo–Tsatsu (GHA) | 0–2 | Streli–Hajós (HUN) | 14–21 | 10–21 | | 24–42 | |
| 7 Oct | 10:00 | A Lezcano–C Lobo (CRC) | 2–0 | Lanteri–Palmaro (MON) | 21–11 | 21–17 | | 42–28 | |
| 9 Oct | 15:00 | A Lezcano–C Lobo (CRC) | 0–2 | Streli–Hajós (HUN) | 13–21 | 18–21 | | 31–42 | |
| 9 Oct | 16:00 | Carboo–Tsatsu (GHA) | 2–1 | Lanteri–Palmaro (MON) | 21–14 | 18–21 | 15–8 | 54–43 | |
| 11 Oct | 9:00 | Streli–Hajós (HUN) | 2–0 | Lanteri–Palmaro (MON) | 21–5 | 21–14 | | 42–19 | |
| 11 Oct | 16:00 | A Lezcano–C Lobo (CRC) | 2–0 | Carboo–Tsatsu (GHA) | 21–16 | 21–18 | | 42–34 | |

==== Pool H ====
| Pos | Team | Pld | W | L | Pts | SW | SL | SR | SPW | SPL | SPR | Qualification |
|---|---|---|---|---|---|---|---|---|---|---|---|---|
| 1 | de Groot–Immers (NED) | 3 | 3 | 0 | 6 | 6 | 0 | MAX | 129 | 93 | 1.387 | Round of 16 |
| 2 | James–Mark (AUS) | 3 | 2 | 1 | 5 | 4 | 3 | 1.333 | 135 | 129 | 1.047 | Round of 24 |
| 3 | João Pedro–Gabriel (BRA) | 3 | 1 | 2 | 4 | 3 | 5 | 0.600 | 122 | 138 | 0.884 | Round of 24 |
| 4 | Gus–Carlos (BOL) | 3 | 0 | 3 | 3 | 1 | 6 | 0.167 | 109 | 135 | 0.807 | |

| Date | Time | | Score | | Set 1 | Set 2 | Set 3 | Total | Report |
|---|---|---|---|---|---|---|---|---|---|
| 8 Oct | 9:00 | de Groot–Immers (NED) | 2–0 | Gus–Carlos (BOL) | 21–17 | 21–12 | | 42–29 | |
| 8 Oct | 10:00 | James–Mark (AUS) | 2–1 | João Pedro–Gabriel (BRA) | 21–14 | 16–21 | 15–13 | 52–48 | |
| 10 Oct | 12:00 | James–Mark (AUS) | 2–0 | Gus–Carlos (BOL) | 21–19 | 21–17 | | 42–36 | |
| 10 Oct | 15:00 | de Groot–Immers (NED) | 2–0 | Joao Pedro–Gabriel (BRA) | 21–11 | 21–12 | | 42–23 | |
| 12 Oct | 14:00 | Gus–Carlos (BOL) | 1–2 | João Pedro–Gabriel (BRA) | 13–21 | 21–15 | 10–15 | 44–51 | |
| 12 Oct | 15:00 | James–Mark (AUS) | 0–2 | de Groot–Immers (NED) | 21–23 | 20–22 | | 41–45 | |

=== Knockout stage ===
==== Round of 24 ====
| Date | Time | | Score | | Set 1 | Set 2 | Set 3 | Total | Report |
|---|---|---|---|---|---|---|---|---|---|
| 13 Oct | 9:00 | Guvu–Monjane (MOZ) | 2–0 | Colley–Koita (GAM) | 21–14 | 21–19 | | 42–33 | |
| 13 Oct | 10:00 | Gabo–Osório (VEN) | 0–2 | A Lezcano–C Lobo (CRC) | 18–21 | 17–21 | | 35–42 | |
| 13 Oct | 11:00 | Ayon–Alayo (CUB) | 2–1 | Santiago–Rivera (PUR) | 21–17 | 13–21 | 15–8 | 49–46 | |
| 13 Oct | 12:00 | Lammel–Droguett (CHI) | 0–2 | James–Mark (AUS) | 12–21 | 23–25 | | 35–46 | |
| 13 Oct | 13:00 | João Pedro–Gabriel (BRA) | 0–2 | Brewster–Schwengel (USA) | 23–25 | 18–21 | | 41–46 | |
| 13 Oct | 14:00 | Åhman–Hellvig (SWE) | 2–1 | Jorge–Gonza (PAR) | 21–17 | 17–21 | 15–9 | 53–47 | |
| 13 Oct | 15:00 | N Phichakon–T Phanupong (THA) | 2–0 | Poznański–Miszczuk (POL) | 21–18 | 21–13 | | 42–31 | |
| 13 Oct | 16:00 | Amieva–Zelayeta (ARG) | 2–0 | Carboo–Tsatsu (GHA) | 21–13 | 21–18 | | 42–31 | |

==== Round of 16 ====
| Date | Time | | Score | | Set 1 | Set 2 | Set 3 | Total | Report |
|---|---|---|---|---|---|---|---|---|---|
| 14 Oct | 9:00 | Streli–Hajós (HUN) | 2–1 | N Phichakon–T Phanupong (THA) | 21–19 | 13–21 | 15–9 | 49–49 | |
| 14 Oct | 10:00 | John–Pfretzschner (GER) | 2–0 | A Lezcano–C Lobo (CRC) | 21–14 | 21–10 | | 42–24 | |
| 14 Oct | 11:00 | J Bello–Bello (GBR) | 2–0 | James–Mark (AUS) | 21–16 | 21–17 | | 42–33 | |
| 14 Oct | 12:00 | Guvu–Monjane (MOZ) | 0–2 | de Groot–Immers (NED) | 10–21 | 11–21 | | 21–42 | |
| 14 Oct | 13:00 | Gysin–Broch (SUI) | 0–2 | Brewster–Schwengel (USA) | 16–21 | 18–21 | | 34–42 | |
| 14 Oct | 14:00 | Åhman–Hellvig (SWE) | 2–0 | Bintang–Danang (INA) | 21–16 | 21–14 | | 42–30 | |
| 14 Oct | 15:00 | Ayon–Alayo (CUB) | 2–1 | Veretiuk–Shekunov (RUS) | 17–21 | 21–17 | 23–21 | 61–59 | |
| 14 Oct | 16:00 | Amieva–Zelayeta (ARG) | 2–0 | Leon–Jurado (ECU) | 21–8 | 21–18 | | 42–26 | |

==== Quarterfinals ====
| Date | Time | | Score | | Set 1 | Set 2 | Set 3 | Total | Report |
|---|---|---|---|---|---|---|---|---|---|
| 15 Oct | 9:00 | John–Pfretzschner (GER) | 0–2 | Åhman–Hellvig (SWE) | 17–21 | 16–21 | | 33–42 | |
| 15 Oct | 10:00 | Streli–Hajós (HUN) | 2–0 | Ayon–Alayo (CUB) | 21–14 | 21–18 | | 42–32 | |
| 15 Oct | 15:00 | Brewster–Schwengel (USA) | 0–2 | de Groot–Immers (NED) | 18–21 | 12–21 | | 30–42 | |
| 15 Oct | 16:00 | J Bello–Bello (GBR) | 0–2 | Amieva–Zelayeta (ARG) | 33–35 | 14–21 | | 47–56 | |

==== Semifinals ====
| Date | Time | | Score | | Set 1 | Set 2 | Set 3 | Total | Report |
|---|---|---|---|---|---|---|---|---|---|
| 16 Oct | 15:00 | Åhman–Hellvig (SWE) | 2–0 | Streli–Hajós (HUN) | 21–9 | 21–16 | | 42–25 | |
| 16 Oct | 16:00 | de Groot–Immers (NED) | 2–1 | Amieva–Zelayeta (ARG) | 20–22 | 21–17 | 15–12 | 56–51 | |

==== Third place game ====
| Date | Time | | Score | | Set 1 | Set 2 | Set 3 | Total | Report |
|---|---|---|---|---|---|---|---|---|---|
| 17 Oct | 14:00 | Amieva–Zelayeta (ARG) | 2–0 | Streli–Hajós (HUN) | 21–15 | 21–15 | | 42–30 | |

==== Final ====
| Date | Time | | Score | | Set 1 | Set 2 | Set 3 | Total | Report |
|---|---|---|---|---|---|---|---|---|---|
| 17 Oct | 15:30 | de Groot–Immers (NED) | 0–2 | Åhman–Hellvig (SWE) | 20–22 | 15–21 | | 35–43 | |
