= Monaco at the 2018 Summer Youth Olympics =

- IOC code: MON
- NOC: Monaco Olympic Committee
- Website: www.comite-olympique.mc

in Buenos Aires, Argentina 6 – 18 October 2018
- Competitors: 5 in 3 sports
- Flag bearer: Charlotte Afriat
- Medals: Gold 0 Silver 0 Bronze 0 Total 0

Summer Youth Olympics appearances
- 2010; 2014; 2018

Monaco participated at the 2018 Summer Youth Olympics in Buenos Aires, Argentina from 6 October to 18 October 2018.

== Beach volleyball ==
Athletes	Event	Preliminary round		Round of 24	Round of 16	Quarterfinals	Semifinals	Final / BM	
Athletes	Event	Opposition Score	Rank	Opposition Score	Opposition Score	Opposition Score	Opposition Score	Opposition Score	Rank
Lanteri–Palmaro	Boys'	Streli–Hajos (HUN); L 0–2; Carboo-Tsatsu (GHA); L 1–2; A. Lezcano–C. Lobo (CRC); L 0–2	4	did not advance					
