= Saint Vincent and the Grenadines at the 2018 Summer Youth Olympics =

- IOC code: VIN
- NOC: St. Vincent and the Grenadines National Olympic Committee

in Buenos Aires, Argentina 6 – 18 October 2018
- Competitors: 6
- Medals: Gold 0 Silver 0 Bronze 0 Total 0

Summer Youth Olympics appearances
- 2010; 2014; 2018

Saint Vincent and the Grenadines participated at the 2018 Summer Youth Olympics in Buenos Aires, Argentina from 6 October to 18 October 2018.

== Beach volleyball ==
Saint Vincent and the Grenadines qualified a boys' and girls' team based on their performance at the 2018 EVCA Zone U19 Championship, however only sent their boys' team.

- Boys' tournament - 1 team of 2 athletes

Athletes	Event	Preliminary round	Standing	Round of 24	Round of 16	Quarterfinals	Semifinals	Final / BM	Rank
Athletes	Event	Opposition Score	Standing	Opposition Score	Opposition Score	Opposition Score	Opposition Score	Opposition Score	Rank
Micah Glasgow; Enrico Demoney Louraine	Boys'	Colley–Koita (GAM)L0-2; Åhman–Hellvig (SWE)L0-2; John–Pfretzschner (GER)L0-2	4	did not advance					

== Rowing ==
Saint Vincent and the Grenadines were given a quota to compete in rowing.

- Boys' single sculls - 1 athlete
