= Costa Rica at the 2018 Summer Youth Olympics =

- IOC code: CRC
- NOC: Costa Rican Olympic Committee

in Buenos Aires, Argentina 6 – 18 October 2018
- Competitors: 17 in 5 sports
- Medals: Gold 0 Silver 0 Bronze 0 Total 0

Summer Youth Olympics appearances
- 2010; 2014; 2018; 2026

Costa Rica participated at the 2018 Summer Youth Olympics in Buenos Aires, Argentina from 6 to 18 October 2018.

== Beach volleyball ==
Costa Rica qualified a boys' based on their performance at the 2018 AFECAVOL Zone U19 Championship.

- Boys' tournament - 1 team of 2 athletes

Athletes	Event	Preliminary round		Round of 24	Round of 16	Quarterfinals	Semifinals	Final / BM	
Athletes	Event	Opposition Score	Rank	Opposition Score	Opposition Score	Opposition Score	Opposition Score	Opposition Score	Rank
Alexandre Lezcano; Criforth Fallas	Boys'	Streli–Hajós (HUN); L 0-2; Carboo–Tsatsu (GHA); W 2-0; Lanteri–Palmaro (MON); W 2-0	2	Gabo–Osório (VEN); W 2-0	John–Pfretzschner (GER); L 0-2	did not advance			

== Fencing ==
Costa Rica was given a quota to compete by the tripartite committee.

- Girls' Épée – Karina Dyner

== Futsal ==
=== Boys' tournament ===
Group stage

Pos	Team	Pld	W	D	L	GF	GA	GD	Pts	Qualification
1	Brazil	4	4	0	0	25	4	+21	12	Semi-finals
2	Russia	4	3	0	1	19	12	+7	9	Semi-finals
3	Iran	4	2	0	2	19	11	+8	6	
4	Costa Rica	4	1	0	3	17	27	−10	3	
5	Solomon Islands	4	0	0	4	13	39	−26	0	

Source: FIFA IOC
7 October 2018
18:00

Costa Rica	1–6	Russia
Corrales 27'	Report (FIFA); Report (IOC)	Sysoliatin 2'; Karpiuk 5', 15'; Fedorov 10', 31'; Subbotin 33'

CeNARD
Attendance: 0
Referee: David Urdánoz (Spain)

9 October 2018
18:00

Solomon Islands	6–11	Costa Rica
Kofana 4', 15'; Mana 19'; Lea'i 20'; Rukumana 39'; Chavarria 39' (o.g.)	Report (FIFA); Report (IOC)	Carvajal 1'; León 7', 21', 22', 25'; Chavarria 8'; Madriz 11'; Vado 16'; Corrales 18', 26'; Baez 37'

Tecnópolis
Attendance: 1,350
Referee: Lance Vanhaitsma (United States)

11 October 2018
18:00

Brazil	6–2	Costa Rica
Guilhermão 3', 4', 39'; Wesley 19', 27'; Vitão 24'	Report (FIFA); Report (IOC)	Carvajal 23'; León 39'

Tecnópolis
Attendance: 1,570
Referee: Ovidiu Curta (Romania)

13 October 2018
18:00

Costa Rica	3–9	Iran
Corrales 1', 3'; Mora 6'	Report (FIFA); Report (IOC)	Tamizi 5'; Adelipour 14'; Alizadeh 15'; Mehdikhani 16'; Aghapour 17' (pen.), 35'; Esmaeili 19' (pen.), 21'; Ghanbari 27' (pen.)

Tecnópolis
Attendance: 6,410
Referee: Ovidiu Curta (Romania)

== Gymnastics ==
=== Artistic ===
Costa Rica qualified one gymnast based on its performance at the 2018 American Junior Championship.

- Girls' artistic individual all-around - Camila Montoya

== Swimming ==
Costa Rica qualified 2 athletes (1 boy and 1 girl) to compete in swimming.

Boys

Athlete	Event	Heats		Semifinals		Final	
Athlete	Event	Time	Rank	Time	Rank	Time	Rank
José David Solis	100 m breaststroke	1:06.32	29	did not advance			
José David Solis	200 m breaststroke	2:24.37	25	did not advance			

Girls

Athlete	Event	Heats		Semifinals		Final	
Athlete	Event	Time	Rank	Time	Rank	Time	Rank
Beatriz Padrón	100 m freestyle	58.66	32	did not advance			
Beatriz Padrón	50 m butterfly	27.56	11	28.18	16	did not advance	
Beatriz Padrón	100 m butterfly	1:02.07	13	1:01.99	14	did not advance	

- Girls: Beatriz Padrón (Women's 50m Free, 50m and 100m Butterfly)
