= Paraguay at the 2018 Summer Youth Olympics =

- IOC code: PAR
- NOC: Paraguayan Olympic Committee
- Website: http://www.cop.org.py/

in Buenos Aires, Argentina 6 – 18 October 2018
- Competitors: 26 in 6 sports
- Flag bearer: Alejandro Benítez
- Medals: Gold 0 Silver 0 Bronze 0 Total 0

Summer Youth Olympics appearances
- 2010; 2014; 2018; 2026

Paraguay participated at the 2018 Summer Youth Olympics in Buenos Aires, Argentina from 6 October to 18 October 2018.

== Archery ==
Paraguay qualified one archer based on its performance at the American Continental Qualification Tournament.

- Boys' individual - Alejandro Benítez

Individual

Athlete	Event	Ranking round		Round of 32	Round of 16	Quarterfinals	Semifinals	Final / BM	Rank
Athlete	Event	Score	Seed	Opposition Score	Opposition Score	Opposition Score	Opposition Score	Opposition Score	Rank
Alejandro Benítez	Boys' Individual	663	16	Hurnall (AUS); W 6–4	Song (KOR); L 1–7	did not advance			9

Team

Athletes	Event	Ranking round		Round of 32	Round of 16	Quarterfinals	Semifinals	Final / BM	Rank
Athletes	Event	Score	Seed	Opposition Score	Opposition Score	Opposition Score	Opposition Score	Opposition Score	Rank
Alejandro Benítez (PAR); Alexandra Voropayeva (KAZ)	Mixed team	1300	15	Reddig (NAM); Cowles (USA); L 0–6	did not advance				17

== Athletics ==
Paraguay qualified one athlete.

- Boys' 100 m - Mateo Vargas

Athlete	Event	Stage 1		Stage 2		Total	
Athlete	Event	Result	Rank	Result	Rank	Total	Rank
Mateo Vargas	Boys' 100 metres	11.05	13	10.61	10	21.66	9

== Beach handball ==
Paraguay qualified a boys' and girls' team based on their overall ranking from the 2017 Youth Beach Handball World Championship.

- Boys' tournament - 1 team
- Girls' tournament - 1 team

== Beach volleyball ==
Paraguay qualified a boys' and girls' team based on their overall ranking from the South American Youth Tour.

- Boys' tournament - Jorge Riveros and Gonzalo Melgarejo.
- Girls' tournament - Giuliana Poletti and Romina Ediger.

Athlete	Event	Group stage		Round of 24	Round of 16	Quarterfinal	Semifinal	Final / BM	Rank
Athlete	Event	Opposition Score	Rank	Opposition Score	Opposition Score	Opposition Score	Opposition Score	Opposition Score	Rank
Giuli–Romi	Girls' tournament	Navas–Gonzalez (PUR); L 0-2; Ravo–Tebeim (VAN); W 2-0; Scampoli–Bertozzi (ITA); L 1-2	3	van Driel–Schoon (NED); L 0-2	did not advance				
Jorge–Gonza	Boys' tournament	Krovon–Ariyata (TOG); W 2–0; Ayon–Alayo (CUB); L 0–2; J Bello–Bello (GBR); L 0–2	3	Åhman–Hellvig (SWE); L 1-2	did not advance				

== Equestrian ==
Paraguay qualified a rider based on its ranking in the FEI World Jumping Challenge Rankings.

- Individual Jumping - Agostina Llano Zuccolillo

Athlete	Horse	Event	Round 1		Round 2			Total		Jump-Off		Rank
Athlete	Horse	Event	Penalties	Rank	Penalties	Total	Rank	Penalties	Rank	Penalties	Time	Rank
Agostina Llano Zuccolillo	Red Sugar Z	Individual Jumping	0	1	4	4	4	4	8	did not advance		8
South America; Philip Mattos Botelho (BRA); Bernardo Lander (VEN); Gonzalo Bedoya (BOL); Agostina Llano Zuccolillo (PAR); Richard Kierkegaard (ARG)	Denise Z Roi Quake Z Ankara I Red Sugar Z Legolas I	Team Jumping	12 # 4; 4 # 0; 0	4	0; 4 # 0; 0; 0	0	4	did not advance				4

== Swimming ==
Paraguay qualified one athlete.

- Boys' 100 m Freestyle - Matheo Mateos

Athlete	Event	Heats		Semifinals		Final	
Athlete	Event	Time	Rank	Time	Rank	Time	Rank
Matheo Mateos	Boys' 100 metre freestyle	52.94	34	did not advance			
