= Netherlands at the 2018 Summer Youth Olympics =

- IOC code: NED
- NOC: NOC*NSF
- Website: http://www.nocnsf.nl/

in Buenos Aires, Argentina 6 – 18 October 2018
- Competitors: 41 in 18 sports
- Medals Ranked 69th: Gold 0 Silver 1 Bronze 5 Total 6

Summer Youth Olympics appearances
- 2010; 2014; 2018; 2026

The Netherlands participated at the 2018 Summer Youth Olympics in Buenos Aires, Argentina from 6 October to 18 October 2018.

== Archery ==
Netherlands qualified one archer based on its performance at the 2017 World Archery Youth Championships.

Individual

Athlete	Event	Ranking round		Round of 32	Round of 16	Quarterfinals	Semifinals	Final / BM	Rank
Athlete	Event	Score	Seed	Opposition Score	Opposition Score	Opposition Score	Opposition Score	Opposition Score	Rank
Laura van der Winkel	Girls' Individual	623	26	Vázquez Cadena (MEX); L 2–6	did not advance				17

Team

Athletes	Event	Ranking round		Round of 32	Round of 16	Quarterfinals	Semifinals	Final / BM	Rank
Athletes	Event	Score	Seed	Opposition Score	Opposition Score	Opposition Score	Opposition Score	Opposition Score	Rank
Laura van der Winkel (NED); Stanislav Cheremiskin (RUS)	Mixed team	1301	8	Son (KOR); Thompson (GBR); W 6–2	Satır (TUR); Akash (IND); L 2–6	did not advance			9

== Badminton ==
The Netherlands qualified one player based on the Badminton Junior World Rankings.

Singles

Athlete	Event	Group stage				Quarterfinal	Semifinal	Final / BM	Rank
Athlete	Event	Opposition Score	Opposition Score	Opposition Score	Rank	Opposition Score	Opposition Score	Opposition Score	Rank
Dennis Koppen	Boys' Singles	Medel (CHI); W 2–0	Nguyễn (VIE); L 0–2	Rumbay (INA); L 0–2	3	did not advance			9
Madouc Linders	Girls' Singles	Lima (BRA); L 0–2	Huang (TPE); L 0–2	Fung (AUS); L 0–2	4	did not advance			9

Team

Athlete	Event	Group stage				Quarterfinal	Semifinal	Final / BM	Rank
Athlete	Event	Opposition Score	Opposition Score	Opposition Score	Rank	Opposition Score	Opposition Score	Opposition Score	Rank
Team Sigma; Dennis Koppen (NED); Rukesh Maharjan (NEP); Ikhsan Rumbay (INA); Cristian Savin (MDA); Madeleine Caren Akoumba Ze (CMR); Grace King (GBR); Ann-Kathrin Spöri (GER); Wang Zhiyi (CHN)	Mixed Teams	Theta (MIX); W (110–100)	Gamma (MIX); W (110–86)	Omega (MIX); L (98–110)	2Q	Zeta (MIX); L (106–110)	did not advance		5
Team Delta; Madouc Linders (NED); Mateo Delmastro (ARG); Arnaud Merklé (FRA); Dmitriy Panarin (KAZ); Balázs Pápai (HUN); Elena Andreu (ESP); Pattarasuda Chaiwan (THA); Petra Polanc (SLO)	Mixed Teams	Zeta (MIX); W (110–95)	Alpha (MIX); W (110–99)	Epsilon (MIX); L (108–110)	1Q	Theta (MIX); L (93–110)	did not advance		5

== Basketball ==
The Netherlands qualified a girls' team based on the U18 3x3 National Federation Ranking.

- Girls' tournament - 1 team of 4 athletes

Event	Group stage					Quarterfinal	Semifinal	Final / BM
Event	Opposition Score	Opposition Score	Opposition Score	Opposition Score	Rank	Opposition Score	Opposition Score	Opposition Score
Girls' tournament	Australia; L 7–11	Estonia; W 22–12	Czech Republic; W 16–10	Spain; W 14–12	2	United States; L 14–18	did not advance	

Shoot-out contest

Athlete	Event	Qualification		Final					
Athlete	Event	Points	Rank	Round 1	Round 2	Round 3	Round 4	Total	Rank
Kiki Fleuren	Shoot-out contest	3	20	did not advance					
Robyn Bouwer	Shoot-out contest	2	29	did not advance					

== Beach volleyball ==
The Netherlands qualified a boys' team based on their performance at 2017-18 European Youth Continental Cup Final.

- Boys' tournament - 1 team of 2 athletes

Athletes	Event	Preliminary round		Round of 24	Round of 16	Quarterfinals	Semifinals	Final / BM	
Athletes	Event	Opposition Score	Rank	Opposition Score	Opposition Score	Opposition Score	Opposition Score	Opposition Score	Rank
de Groot; Immers	Boys' tournament	Gus–Carlos (BOL); W 2-0; João Pedro–Gabriel (BRA); W 2-0; James–Mark (AUS); W 2-0	1	Bye	Guvu–Monjane (MOZ); W 2-0	Brewster–Schwengel (USA); W 2-0	Amieva–Zelayeta (ARG); W 2-1	Åhman–Hellvig (SWE); L 0-2	2nd place, silver medalist(s)
van Driel; Schoon	Girls' tournament	Nicole–Canedo (BOL); L 0-2; Dickson–Otene (NZL); W 2-0; Dorcas–Kutekenenyi (COD); W 2-0	2	Giuli–Romi (PAR); W 2-0	Voronina–Bocharova (RUS); L 1-2	did not advance			

== Dancesport ==
The Netherlands qualified one dancer based on its performance at the 2018 World Youth Breaking Championship.

- B-Girls - Vicky

== Diving ==
Athlete	Event	Preliminary		Final	
Athlete	Event	Points	Rank	Points	Rank
Dylan Vork	Girls' 3 m springboard	477.35	11	457.75	12
Anna dos Santos (BRA); Dylan Vork (NED)	Mixed team	—N/a		241.35	14

== Equestrian ==
The Netherlands qualified a rider based on its performance at the FEI European Junior Jumping Championships.

- Individual Jumping - 1 athlete

== Golf ==
Individual

Athlete	Event	Round 1		Round 2			Round 3			Total		
Athlete	Event	Score	Rank	Score	Total	Rank	Score	Total	Rank	Score	Par	Rank
Lauren Holmey	Girls' Individual	81 (+11)	25	81 (+11)	162	27	77 (+7)	239	24	239	+29	28
Jerry Ji	Boys' Individual	72 (+2)	9	71 (+1)	143	8	68 (-2)	211	1	211	+1	3rd place, bronze medalist(s)

Team

Athletes	Event	Round 1 (Fourball)		Round 2 (Foursome)		Round 3 (Individual Stroke)				Total		
Athletes	Event	Score	Rank	Score	Rank	Girl	Boy	Total	Rank	Score	Par	Rank
Lauren Holmey; Jerry Ji	Mixed team	64 (-6)	6	77 (+7)	21	82	75	157 (+17)	28	298	+18	26

== Judo ==
Individual

Athlete	Event	Round of 16	Quarterfinals	Semifinals	Rep 1	Rep 2	Final / BM	Rank
Athlete	Event	Opposition Result	Opposition Result	Opposition Result	Opposition Result	Opposition Result	Opposition Result	Rank
Mark van Dijk	Boys' 81 kg	Alex Barto (SVK); L 000-01s1	did not advance		Rhys Allan (AUS); W 01-00s2	Rihari Iki (NZL); W 10-00	Ahmed Rebahi (ALG); W 10-01s12	3rd place, bronze medalist(s)
Marin Visser	Girls' 63 kg	Bye	Szofi Özbas (HUN); L 00-10	did not advance	Kim Ju-hee (KOR); L 01-00s2	did not advance		

Team

Athletes	Event	Round of 16	Quarterfinals	Semifinals	Final	Rank
Athletes	Event	Opposition Result	Opposition Result	Opposition Result	Opposition Result	Rank
Team Athens; Mireille Andriamifehy (MAD); Martin Bezděk (CZE); Juan Montealegre (COL); Javier Peña Insausti (ESP); Christi Rose Pretorius (ZIM); Tababi Devi Thangjam (IND); Marin Visser (NED); Anwar Zrhari (MAR)	Mixed team	Bye	Team Los Angeles (MIX); W 5–3	Team Rio de Janeiro (MIX); W 5–3	Team Beijing (MIX); L 4–5	2nd place, silver medalist(s)
Team Barcelona; Mikaela Rojas (ARG); Sosorbaram Lkhagvasuren (MGL); Nikol Pencue (COL); Margarita Gritsenko (KAZ); Loreince Nanekoula (GAB); Jalen Kon Elijah (CMR); Mark van Dijk (NED)	Mixed team	Atlanta (MIX); L 3-4	did not advance			9

== Roller speed skating ==
The Netherlands qualified two roller skaters based on its performance at the 2018 Roller Speed Skating World Championship.

- Boys' combined speed event - Merijn Scheperkamp
- Girls' combined speed event - Marit van Beijnum

== Rowing ==
The Netherlands qualified one boat based on its performance at the 2018 European Rowing Junior Championships.

- Girls' pairs - 1 boat

== Sailing ==
The Netherlands qualified one boat based on its performance at the Techno 293+ European Qualifier. They qualified another boat based on its performance at the 2018 Nacra 15 World Championships.

- Boys' Techno 293+ - 1 boat
- Mixed Nacra 15 - 1 boat

== Tennis ==
Singles

Athlete	Event	Round of 32	Round of 16	Quarterfinals	Semifinals	Final / BM	
Athlete	Event	Opposition Score	Opposition Score	Opposition Score	Opposition Score	Opposition Score	Rank
J de Jong (NED)	Boys' singles	A Dawani (BHR); W 6-2, 6-1	F Díaz Acosta (ARG); L 6-4, 4-6, 3-6	did not advance			

Doubles

Athletes	Event	Round of 32	Round of 16	Quarterfinals	Semifinals	Final / BM	
Athletes	Event	Opposition Score	Opposition Score	Opposition Score	Opposition Score	Opposition Score	Rank
J de Jong (NED); D Wenger (SUI)	Boys' doubles	N Álvarez Varona (ESP); C López Montagud (ESP); W 6-7, 6-2, 10-8	O Štyler (CZE); D Svrčina (CZE); L 6-2, 1-6, 5-10	did not advance			
E Molinaro (LUX); J de Jong (NED)	Mixed doubles	M Bilokin (UKR); Y Erel (TUR); W 6-1, 6-3	E Cocciaretto (ITA); L Musetti (ITA); W 4-6, 6-2, 12-10	L Sun (SUI); D Wenger (SUI); L 4-6, 6-3, 10-12	did not advance		

== Triathlon ==
The Netherlands qualified one athlete based on its performance at the 2018 European Youth Olympic Games Qualifier.

Individual

Athlete	Event	Swim (750m)	Trans 1	Bike (20 km)	Trans 2	Run (5 km)	Total Time	Rank
Barbara de Koning	Girls	9:58	0:47	30:17	0:30	19:00	1:00:32	6

Relay

Athlete	Event	Total Times per Athlete (Swim 250m, Bike 6.6 km, Run 1.8 km)	Total Group Time	Rank
Europe 2 Eva Daniels (LUX); Andreas Carlsson (SWE); Barbara de Koning (NED); Baptiste Passemard (FRA)	Mixed Relay	22:24 (4) - - -	DNF	

== Weightlifting ==
Athlete	Event	Snatch		Clean & Jerk		Total	Rank
Athlete	Event	Result	Rank	Result	Rank	Total	Rank
Enzo Kuworge	Boys' +85 kg	162	2	203	3	365	3rd place, bronze medalist(s)
