= 2018 Summer Youth Olympics medal table =

The 2018 Summer Youth Olympics medal table is a list of National Olympic Committees (NOCs) ranked by the number of gold medals won by their athletes during the 2018 Summer Youth Olympics, held in Buenos Aires, Argentina, from 6 to 18 October 2018.

Of the nations that won medals at these Games, two had not won an Olympic medal nor Youth Olympic medal, Honduras and Saint Lucia. Burundi, Iceland, Malaysia, Mauritius, Qatar and Saudi Arabia won their first gold medal at an Olympic/Youth Olympic event, having previously only won silver and bronze medals. India won their first Youth Olympics gold medal. Afghanistan, Algeria, Kosovo, Luxembourg, Macedonia, Mauritius, Niger, Philippines, Sri Lanka and United Arab Emirates won their first ever Youth Olympics medals.

== Medal table ==
The Organising Committee is not keeping an official medal tally. The ranking in this table is based on information provided by the International Olympic Committee (IOC) and is consistent with IOC convention in its published medal tables. By default, the table is ordered by the number of gold medals the athletes from a nation have won (in this context, a "nation" is an entity represented by a National Olympic Committee). The number of silver medals is taken into consideration next and then the number of bronze medals. If nations are still tied, equal ranking is given and they are listed alphabetically.

Two gold medals were awarded for a first-place tie in the Mixed BMX freestyle park event. No silver medal was awarded as a consequence. Two silver medals were awarded for a second-place tie in the Boys' 50 m butterfly swimming, Boys' IKA Twin Tip Racing and Girls' IKA Twin Tip Racing events. No bronze medal was awarded as a consequence.

In November 2019, in the girls' +63 kg event in weightlifting, Thailand gold medallist had tested positive for a banned substance, and the medal was stripped. As a result, Turkey was raised from a silver to gold medal, Uzbekistan from the bronze medal to a silver and New Zealand received a bronze medal.

In judo (9), karate (6) and taekwondo (10) two bronze medals are awarded in each event (25 additional bronze medals total). Additionally, two bronze medals were awarded for a third-place tie in the girls' 50 m butterfly swimming and girls' 50 m freestyle swimming events.

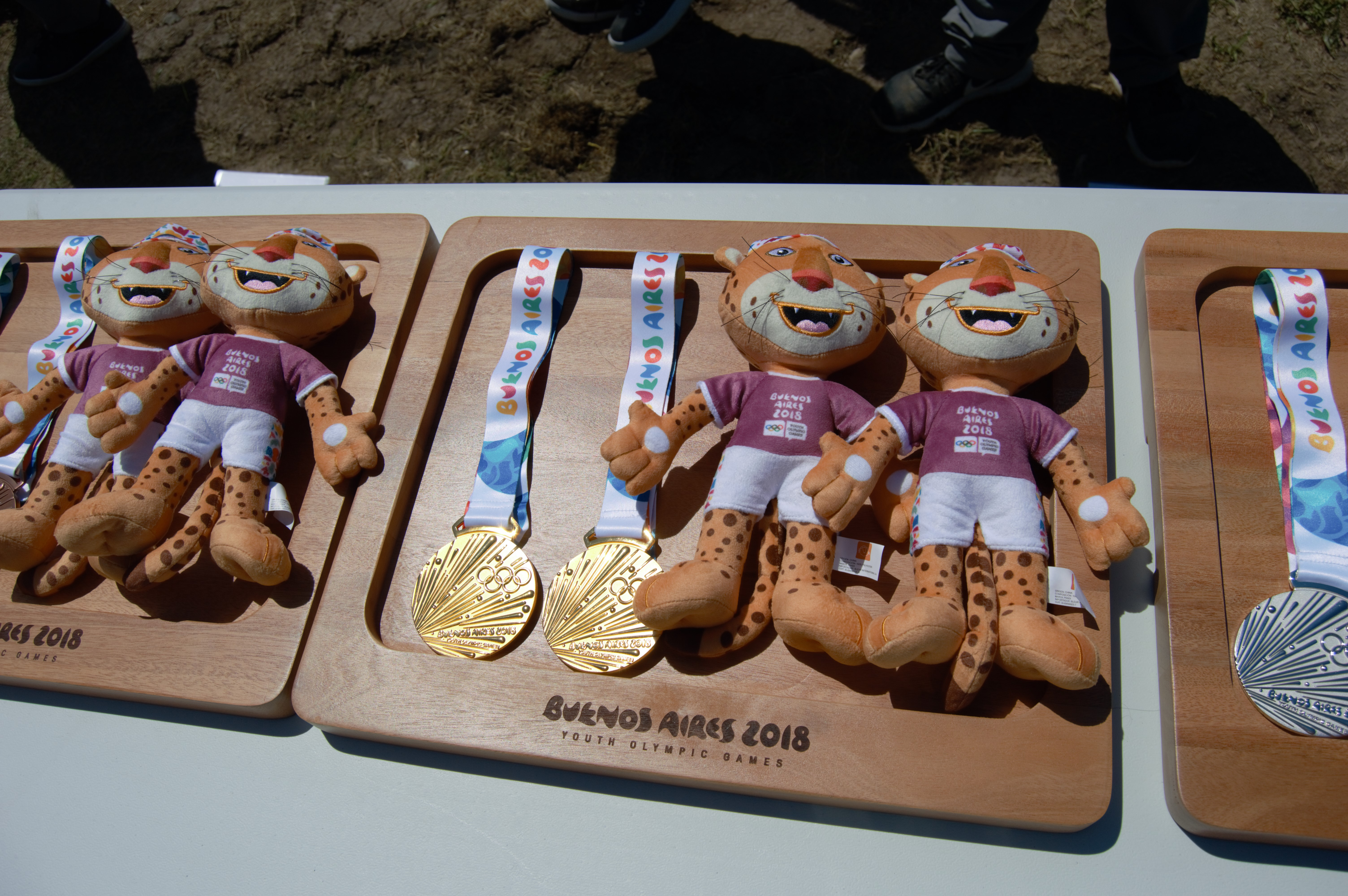
Medals and Mascots of the Games, delivered during Victory ceremonies to medal winners.

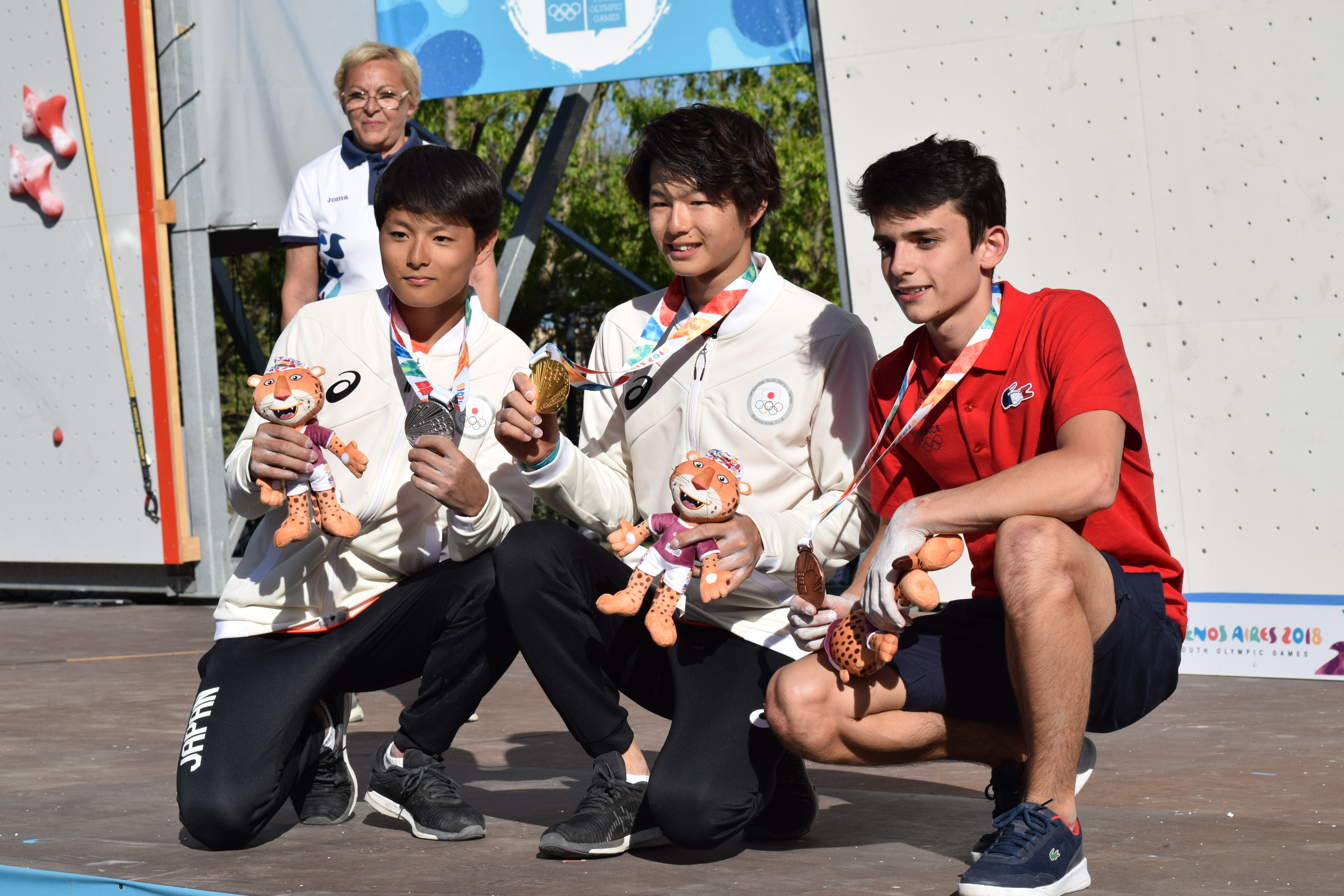
Boys' Sport Climbing combined event medal winners.

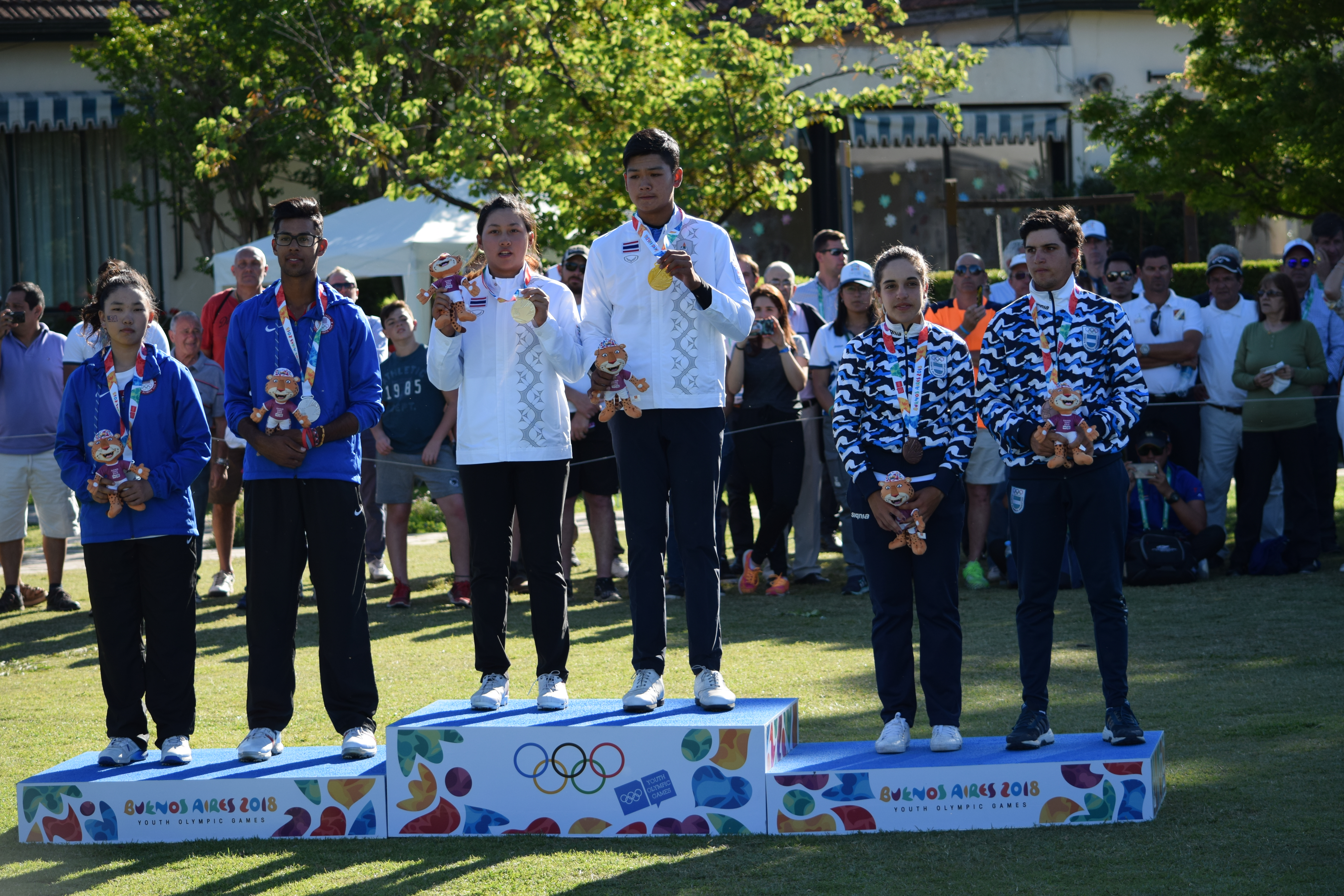
Golf Mixed team event medal winners.

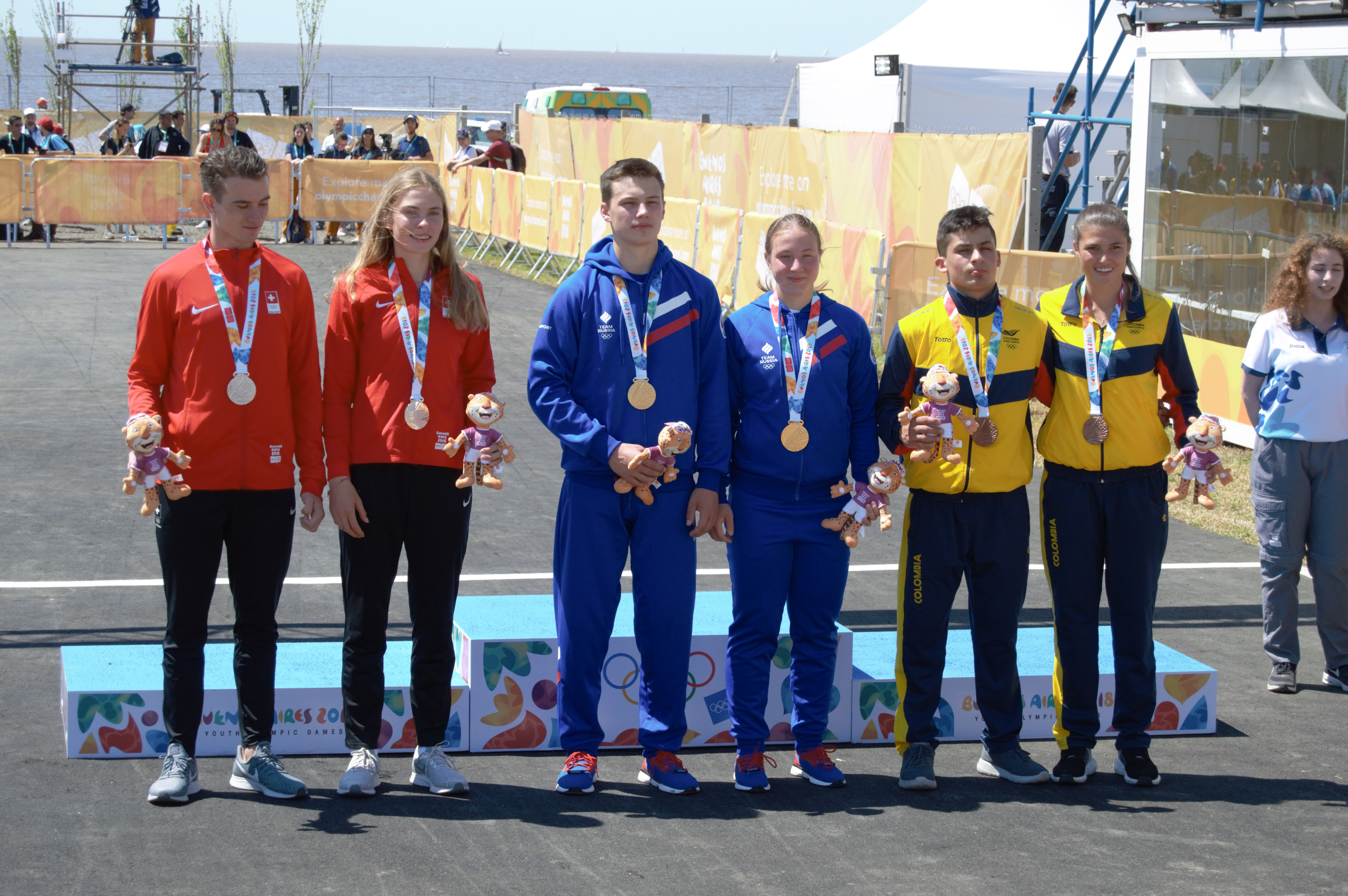
BMX Cycling Mixed team event medal winners.

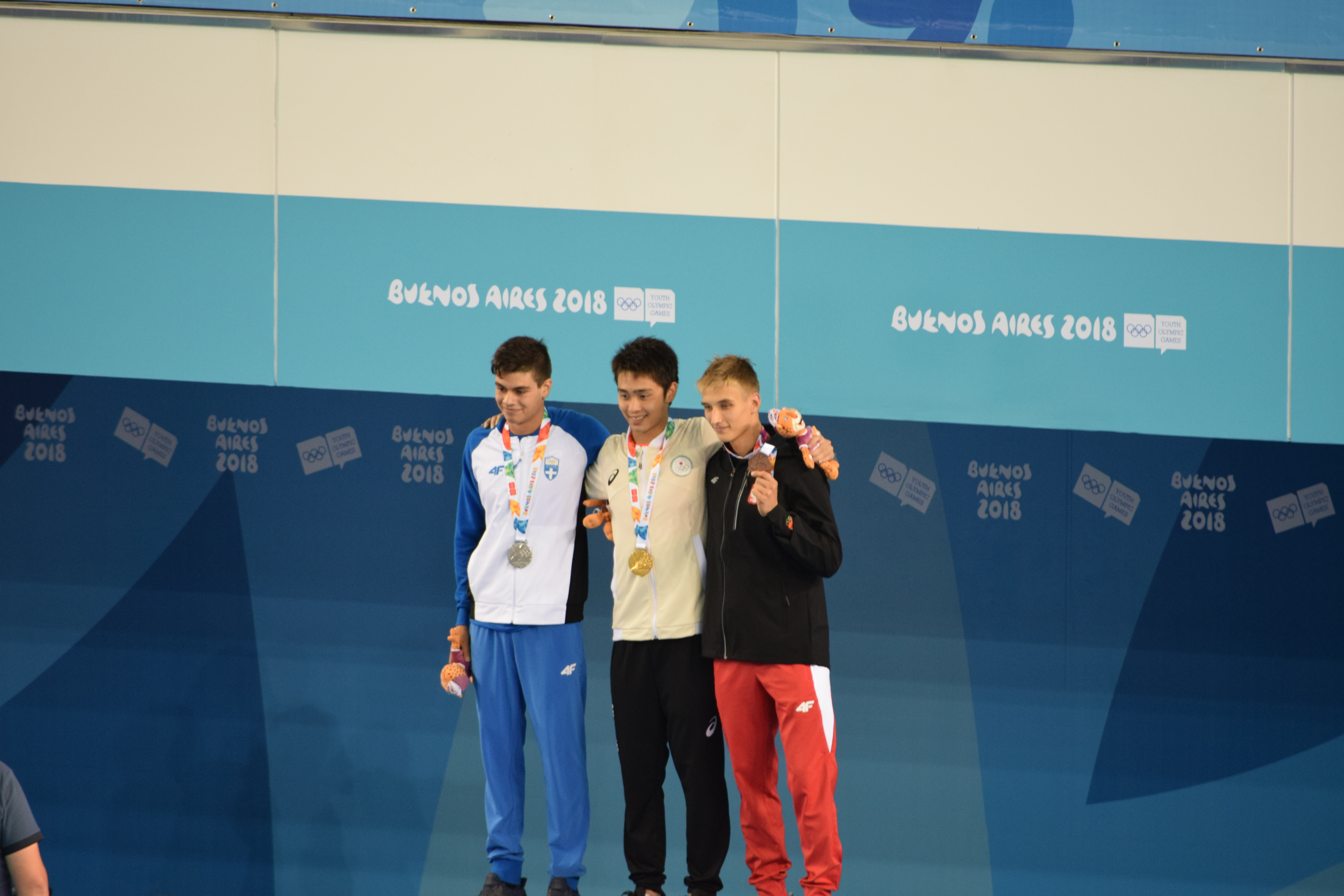
Boys' 200m Swimming Breaststroke event medal winners.

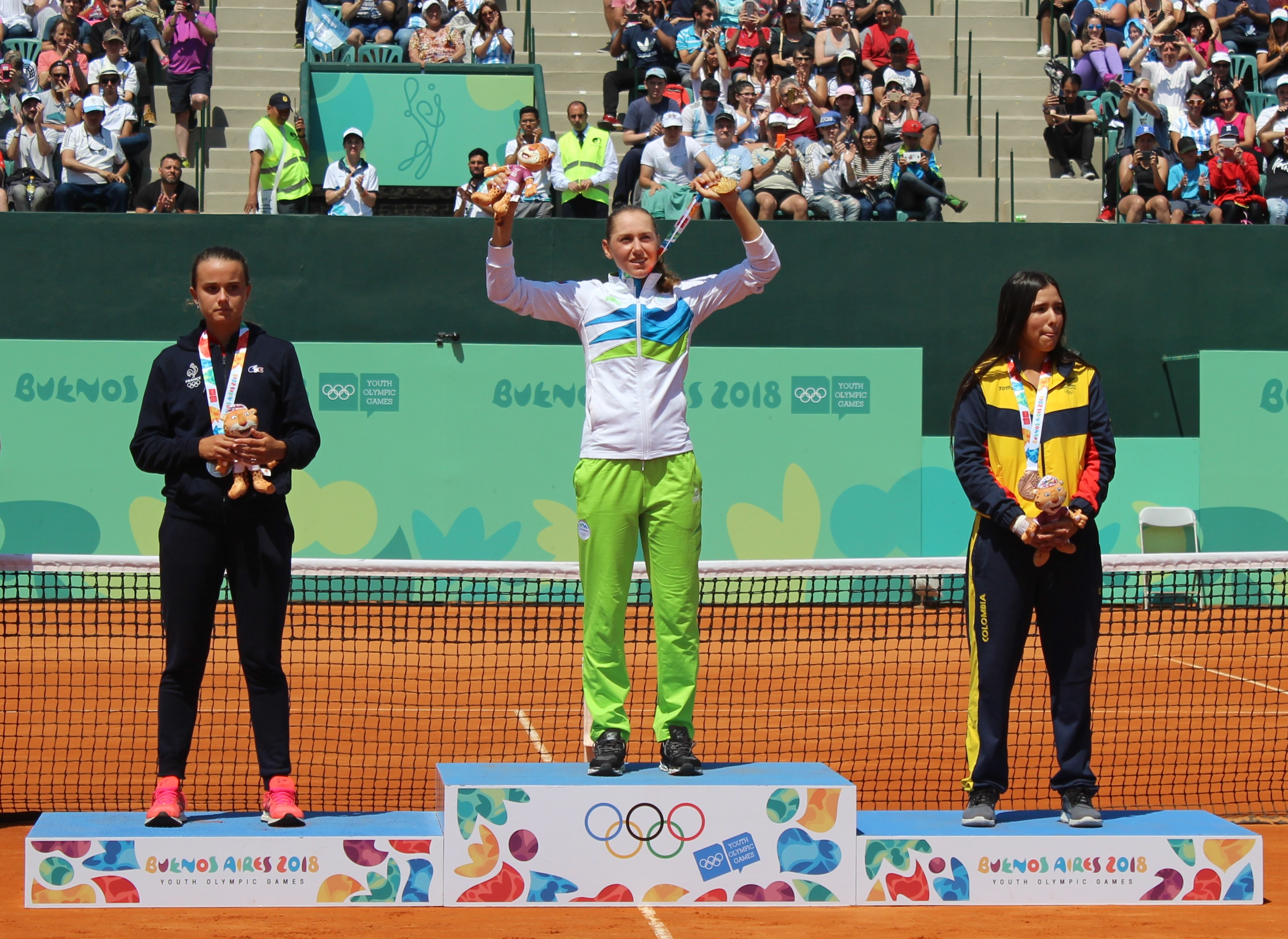
Girls' Singles Tennis event medal winners.

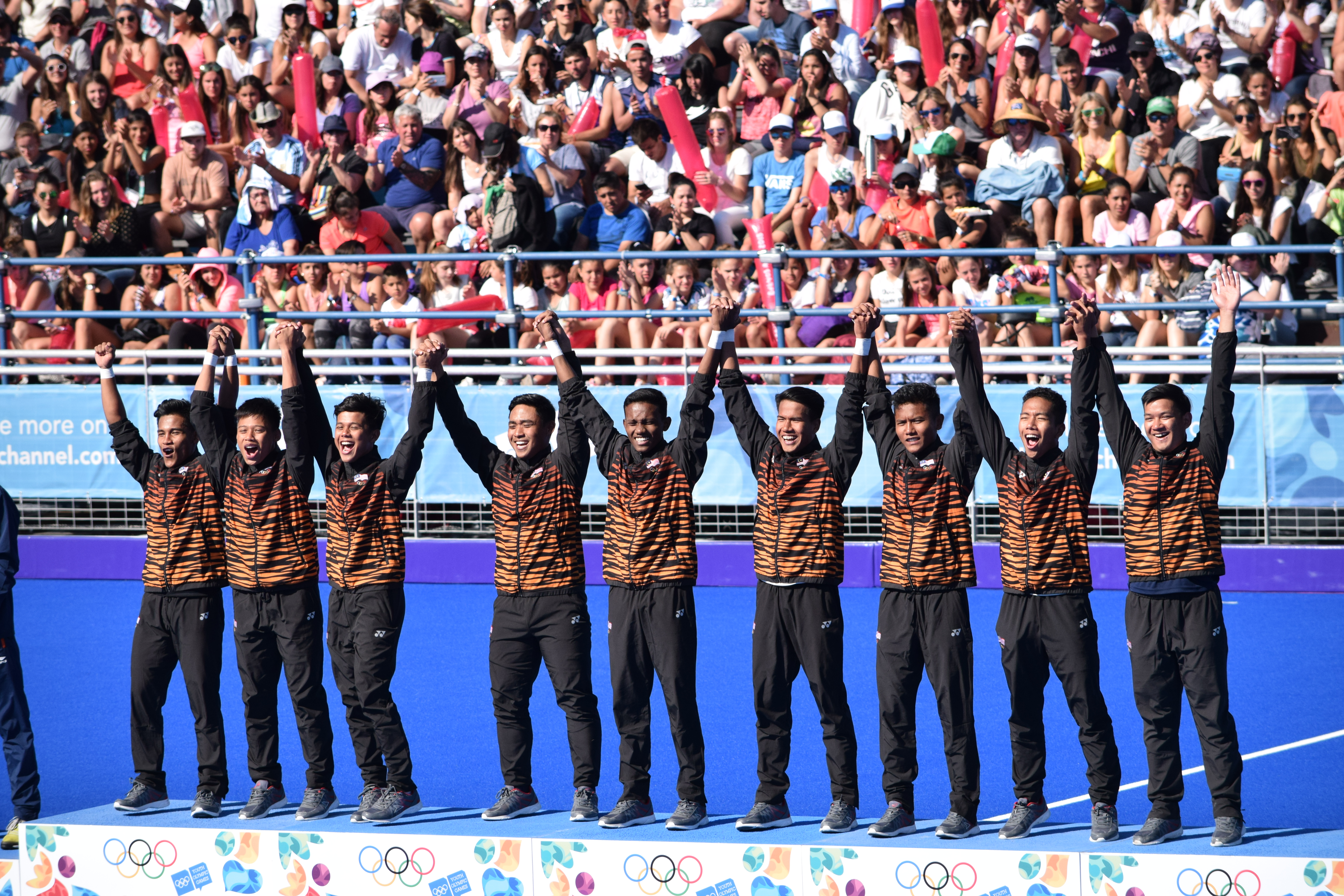
Malaysian team celebrating its Boys' Field Hockey event win.

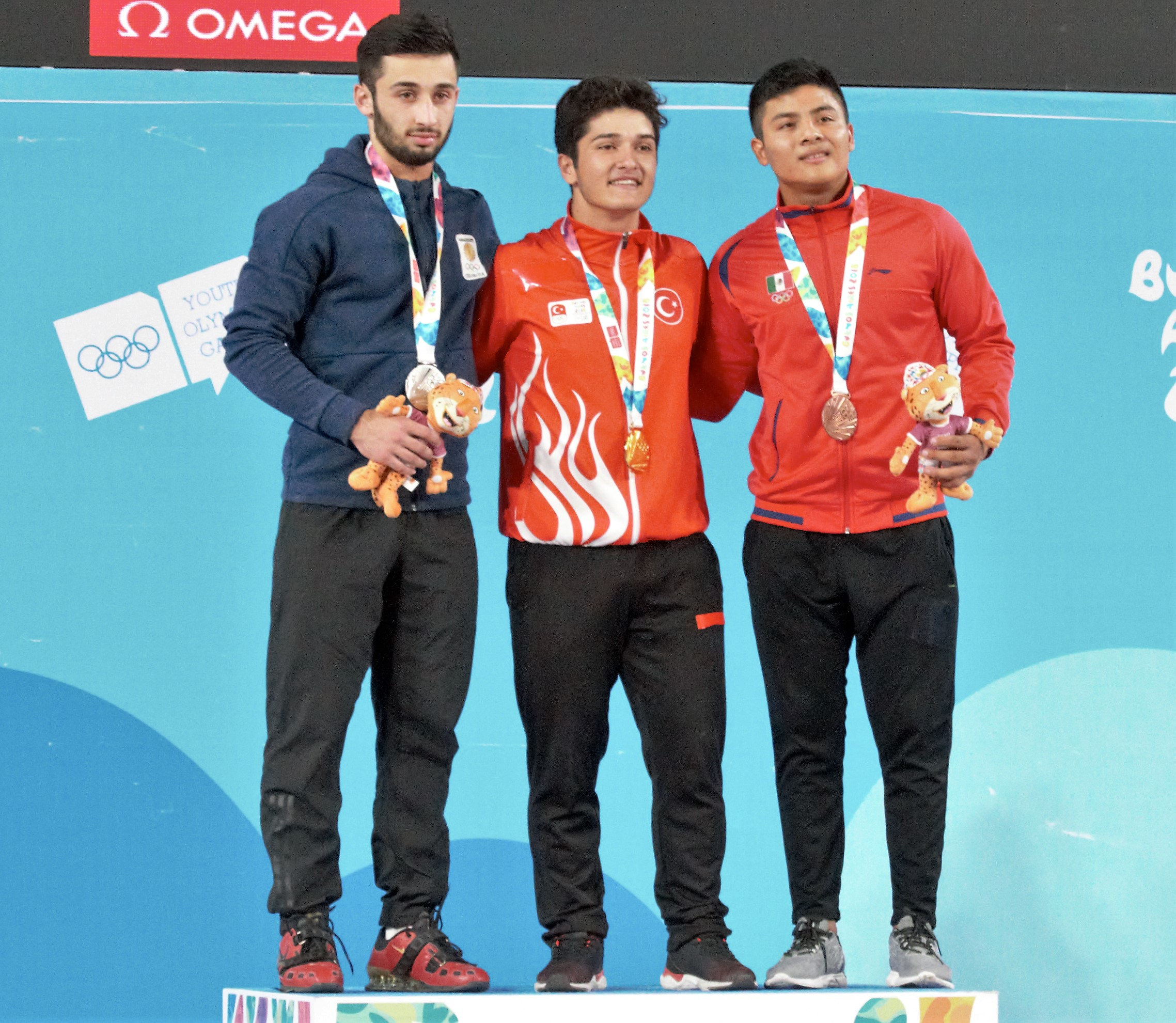
Weightlifting Boys' 69kg medal winners

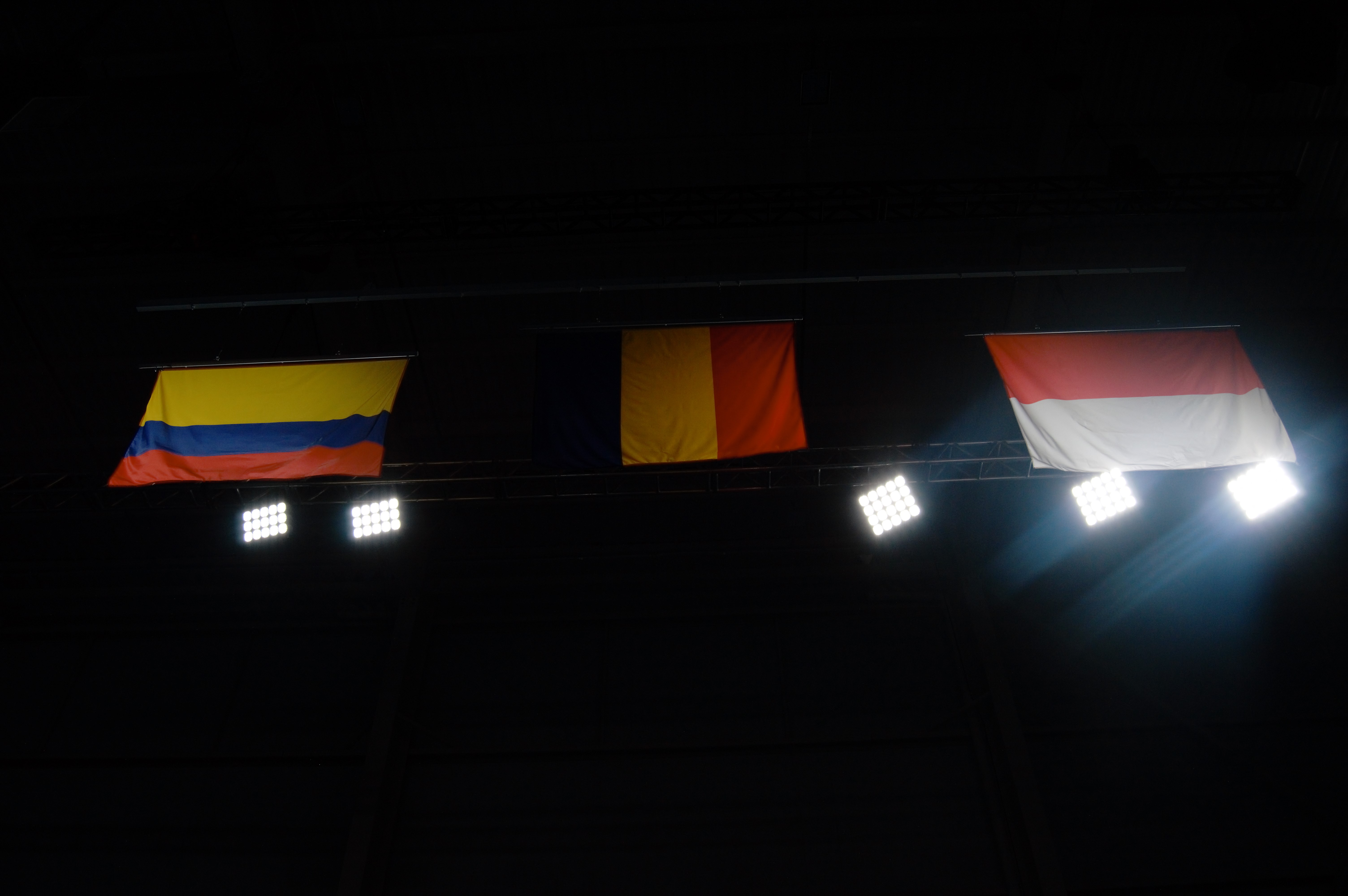
Flags hoisted during the Weightlifting Girls' 53kg Victory ceremony.

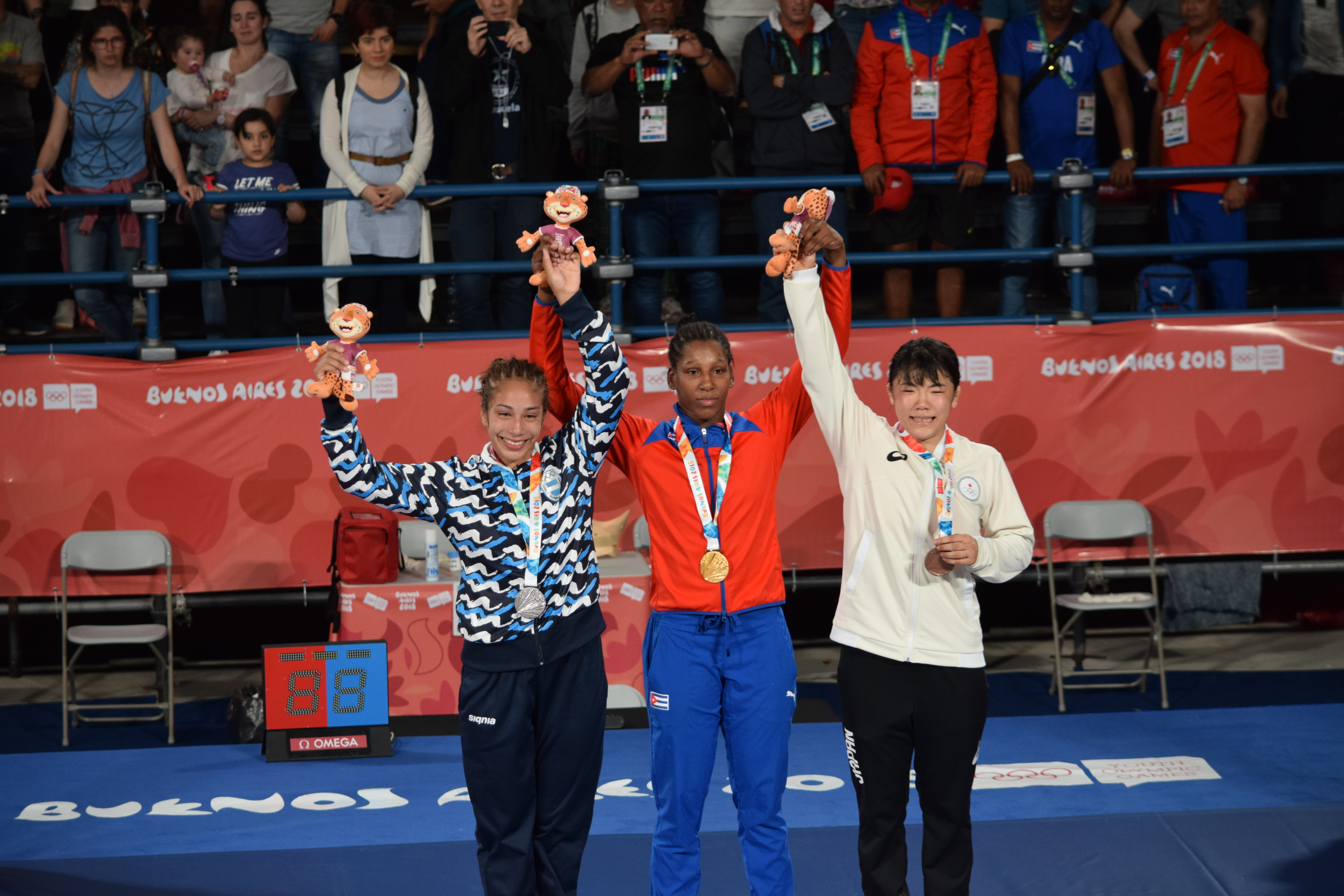
Girls' Freestyle 73kg Wrestling Medallist Ceremony

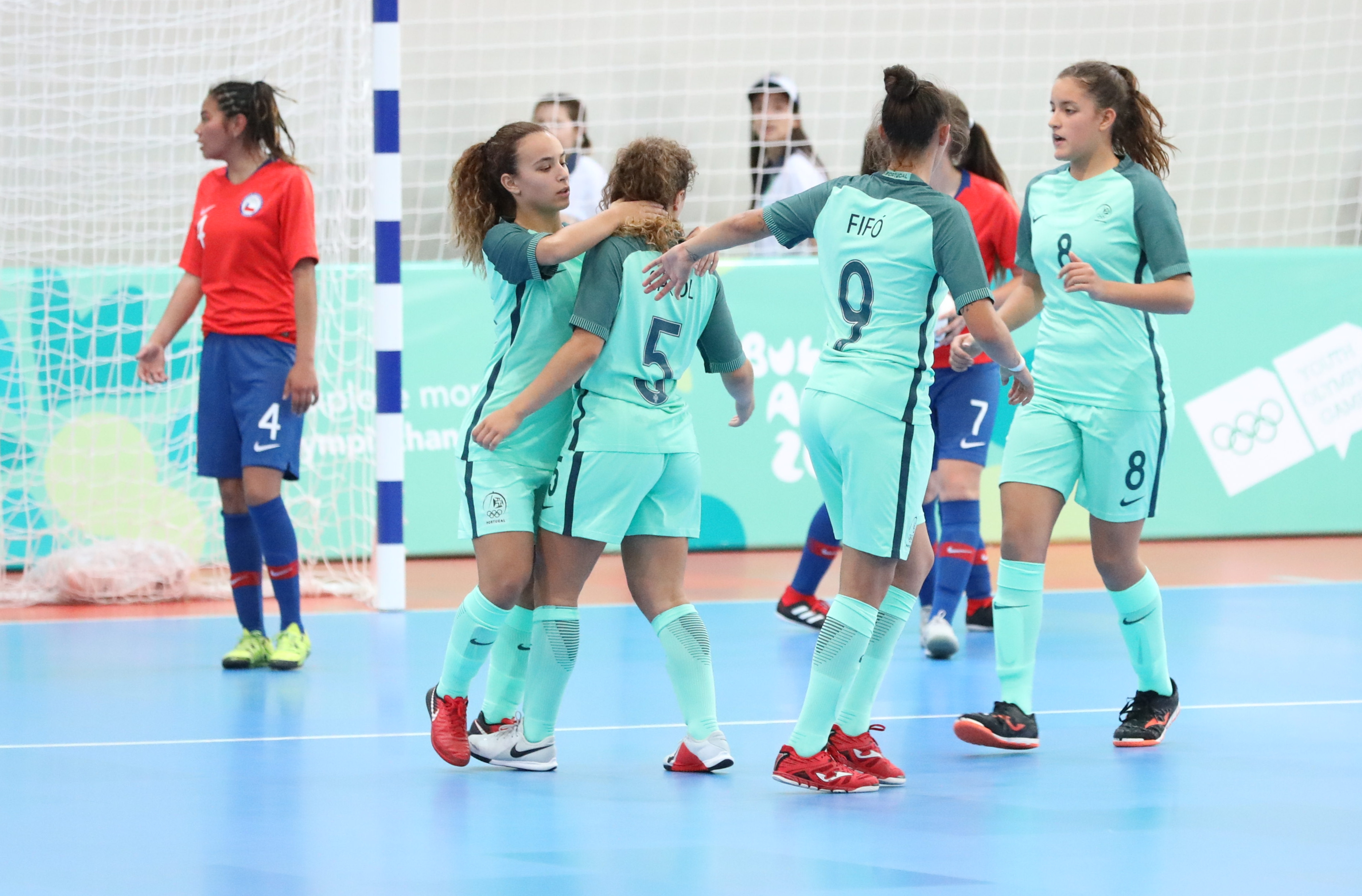
Futsal match between Portugal and Chile. The Portuguese female team went on to win the gold medal later.

* Host nation (Argentina)

Rank	Nation	Gold	Silver	Bronze	Total
1	Russia	29	18	12	59
2	China	18	9	9	36
3	Japan	15	12	12	39
–	Mixed-NOCs	13	13	13	39
4	Hungary	12	7	5	24
5	Italy	11	10	13	34
6	Argentina*	11	6	9	26
7	Iran	7	3	4	14
8	United States	6	5	7	18
9	France	5	15	7	27
10	Ukraine	5	7	6	18
11	Australia	4	8	4	16
12	Uzbekistan	4	5	5	14
13	Thailand	4	5	2	11
14	Colombia	4	3	3	10
14	Kazakhstan	4	3	3	10
16	Cuba	4	0	2	6
17	India	3	9	1	13
18	Great Britain	3	4	5	12
19	Germany	3	4	2	9
20	Mexico	3	3	6	12
21	Czech Republic	3	3	5	11
22	Egypt	3	2	7	12
23	Sweden	3	2	1	6
24	Greece	3	1	2	6
25	New Zealand	3	1	1	5
25	South Africa	3	1	1	5
27	Kenya	3	1	0	4
28	Brazil	2	4	7	13
29	Romania	2	3	3	8
30	Belgium	2	3	2	7
31	Turkey	2	2	7	11
32	Slovenia	2	2	5	9
33	Ethiopia	2	2	4	8
34	Bulgaria	2	2	2	6
35	Azerbaijan	2	1	3	6
35	Norway	2	1	3	6
37	Denmark	2	1	1	4
38	Vietnam	2	1	0	3
39	Malaysia	2	0	0	2
39	Moldova	2	0	0	2
39	Qatar	2	0	0	2
39	Venezuela	2	0	0	2
43	Morocco	1	5	1	7
44	South Korea	1	4	7	12
45	Georgia	1	4	1	6
46	Spain	1	3	5	9
47	Belarus	1	3	3	7
48	Nigeria	1	3	0	4
49	Ecuador	1	2	2	5
50	Portugal	1	2	0	3
51	Austria	1	1	7	9
52	Israel	1	1	1	3
52	Lithuania	1	1	1	3
52	Slovakia	1	1	1	3
52	Tunisia	1	1	1	3
56	Saudi Arabia	1	0	2	3
57	Armenia	1	0	1	2
57	Dominican Republic	1	0	1	2
57	Finland	1	0	1	2
57	Uganda	1	0	1	2
61	Burundi	1	0	0	1
61	Iceland	1	0	0	1
61	Mauritius	1	0	0	1
64	Algeria	0	5	0	5
65	Canada	0	3	6	9
66	Serbia	0	2	3	5
67	Kyrgyzstan	0	2	1	3
67	Mongolia	0	2	1	3
69	Netherlands	0	1	5	6
70	Poland	0	1	3	4
71	Chinese Taipei	0	1	2	3
71	Croatia	0	1	2	3
71	Ireland	0	1	2	3
71	Puerto Rico	0	1	2	3
71	Switzerland	0	1	2	3
76	Hong Kong	0	1	1	2
76	Jamaica	0	1	1	2
76	Zambia	0	1	1	2
79	Luxembourg	0	1	0	1
79	Philippines	0	1	0	1
79	Saint Lucia	0	1	0	1
79	United Arab Emirates	0	1	0	1
83	Afghanistan	0	0	1	1
83	Eritrea	0	0	1	1
83	Estonia	0	0	1	1
83	Honduras	0	0	1	1
83	Indonesia	0	0	1	1
83	Jordan	0	0	1	1
83	Kosovo	0	0	1	1
83	Macedonia	0	0	1	1
83	Niger	0	0	1	1
83	Pakistan	0	0	1	1
83	Sri Lanka	0	0	1	1
Totals (93 entries)		240	241	263	744

Source: IOC
