= Algeria at the 2018 Summer Youth Olympics =

- IOC code: ALG
- NOC: Algerian Olympic Committee
- Website: http://www.coa.dz/

in Buenos Aires, Argentina 6 – 18 October 2018
- Competitors: 30 in 11 sports
- Medals Ranked 64th: Gold 0 Silver 5 Bronze 0 Total 5

Summer Youth Olympics appearances (overview)
- 2010; 2014; 2018; 2026

Algeria participated at the 2018 Summer Youth Olympics in Buenos Aires, Argentina from 6 October to 18 October 2018.

== Medalists ==
| Medal | Name | Sport | Event | Date |
|---|---|---|---|---|
| Silver | Fateh Benferdjallah | Wrestling | Boys' freestyle 80 kg | 14 October |
| Silver | Mohamed Ali Gouaned | Athletics | Boys' 800 metres | 15 October |
| Silver | Loubna Benhadja | Athletics | Girls' 400 metre hurdles | 16 October |
| Silver | Farid Douibi | Boxing | Boys' middleweight | 17 October |
| Silver | Mohamed Amine Hacid | Boxing | Boys' heavyweight | 17 October |

Mixed NOC

| Medal | Name | Sport | Event | Team | Date |
|---|---|---|---|---|---|
| Bronze | Yassamine Djellab | Judo | Mixed team | Rio de Janeiro | 10 October |
| Bronze | Ahmed Rebahi | Judo | Mixed team | London | 10 October |

== Athletics ==
| Athlete | Event | Stage 1 | Stage 2 | Final Placing |
|---|---|---|---|---|
| Mohamed Ali Gouaned | Men's 800m | 1:50.08 | 1:51.66 | 2nd place, silver medalist(s) |
| Hamdani Benahamed | Men's 1500m/Cross Country | 4:01.72 | DNF | DNF |
| Mohamed A Zadi | Men's 110m Hurdles | 14.46 | 14.50 | 15 |
| Bilel Afer | Men's High Jump | 2.00 | 1.98 | 12 |
| Said Khoufache | Men's 5000m Race Walk | 22:00.00 | 23:39.49 | 13 |
| Loubna Benhadja | Women's 400m Hurdles | 1:00.98 | 59.70 | 2nd place, silver medalist(s) |

== Badminton ==
Algeria qualified one player based on the Badminton Junior World Rankings.

| Athlete | Event | Group stage | | | | Quarterfinals | Semifinals | Final / BM | |
| Athlete | Event | Opposition Score | Opposition Score | Opposition Score | Rank | Opposition Score | Opposition Score | Opposition Score | Rank |
|---|---|---|---|---|---|---|---|---|---|
| Halla Bouksani | Girls' singles | Wang Zhiyi (CHN); L (10–21 10–21) | Hirari Mizui (JPN); L (1–21 9–21) | Léonice Huet (FRA); L (15–21 10–21) | 4 | Did not advance | | | 9 |

Team

| Athlete | Event | Group stage | | | | Quarterfinal | Semifinal | Final / BM | Rank |
| Athlete | Event | Opposition Score | Opposition Score | Opposition Score | Rank | Opposition Score | Opposition Score | Opposition Score | Rank |
|---|---|---|---|---|---|---|---|---|---|
| Team Gamma; Halla Bouksani (ALG); Uriel Canjura (ESA); Joel Koh (SGP); Li Shifeng (CHN); Alonso Medel (CHI); Fernanda Saponara Rivva (PER); Jakka Vaishnavi Reddy (IND) | Mixed Teams | Omega (MIX); L (99–110) | Sigma (MIX); L (86–110) | Theta (MIX); W (110–107) | 3Q | Alpha (MIX); L (94–110) | Did not advance | | 5 |

== Boxing ==
Boys

| Athlete | Event | Preliminary R1 | Preliminary R2 | Semifinals | Final / RM | Rank |
| Athlete | Event | Opposition Result | Opposition Result | Opposition Result | Opposition Result | Rank |
|---|---|---|---|---|---|---|
| Hichem Maouche | -52 kg | Clancy (IRL); L 0–5 | Price (GBR); L 0–5 | Did not advance | Naeemi (AFG); W WO | 5 |
| Farid Douibi | -75 kg | Bye | Jiménez (VEN); W 5–0 | Poutoa (SAM); W 5–0 | Machado (BRA); L 0–5 | 2nd place, silver medalist(s) |
| Mohamed-Amine Hacid | -91 kg | Bye | Matthes (SAM); W 5–0 | Mikušťák (CZE); W 3–2 | Oralbay (KAZ); L 0–5 | 2nd place, silver medalist(s) |

Girls

| Athlete | Event | Preliminaries | Semifinals | Final / RM | Rank |
| Athlete | Event | Opposition Result | Opposition Result | Opposition Result | Rank |
|---|---|---|---|---|---|
| Ichrak Chaib | -75 kg | Bye | Brillaux (FRA); L 0–5 | Ryabets (KAZ); L 0–5 | 4 |

== Fencing ==
Algeria qualified two athletes based on its performance at the 2018 Cadet World Championship.

== Gymnastics ==
=== Artistic ===
Algeria qualified one gymnast based on its performance at the 2018 African Junior Championship, however they did not participate in the competition.

=== Trampoline ===
Algeria qualified one gymnast based on its performance at the 2018 African Junior Championship.

| Athlete | Event | Qualification | | Final | |
| Athlete | Event | Score | Rank | Score | Rank |
|---|---|---|---|---|---|
| Noureddine Younes Belkhir | Boys' | 91.965 | 10 | Did not advance | |

=== Multidiscipline ===
| Team | Athlete | Acrobatic | Artistic | Rhythmic | Trampoline | Total points | Rank |
|---|---|---|---|---|---|---|---|
| Team Kohei Uchimura (Blue) | Daryna Plokhotniuk (UKR); Oleksandr Madei (UKR) | 10 | —N/a | | | 407 | 8 |
| Team Kohei Uchimura (Blue) | Abdulaziz Mirvaliev (UZB) | —N/a | 115 | —N/a | | 407 | 8 |
| Team Kohei Uchimura (Blue) | Michael Torres (PUR) | —N/a | 117 | —N/a | | 407 | 8 |
| Team Kohei Uchimura (Blue) | Ondřej Kalný (CZE) | —N/a | – | —N/a | | 407 | 8 |
| Team Kohei Uchimura (Blue) | Amelie Morgan (GBR) | —N/a | 20 | —N/a | | 407 | 8 |
| Team Kohei Uchimura (Blue) | Tang Xijing (CHN) | —N/a | 9 | —N/a | | 407 | 8 |
| Team Kohei Uchimura (Blue) | Csenge Bácskay (HUN) | —N/a | 5 | —N/a | | 407 | 8 |
| Team Kohei Uchimura (Blue) | Josephine Juul Møller (NOR) | —N/a | | 34 | —N/a | 407 | 8 |
| Team Kohei Uchimura (Blue) | Denisa Stoian (ROU) | —N/a | | 47 | —N/a | 407 | 8 |
| Team Kohei Uchimura (Blue) | Anna Kamenshchikova (BLR) | —N/a | | 22 | —N/a | 407 | 8 |
| Team Kohei Uchimura (Blue) | Noureddine-Younes Belkhir (ALG) | —N/a | | | 21 | 407 | 8 |
| Team Kohei Uchimura (Blue) | Emily Mussmann (SUI) | —N/a | | | 7 | 407 | 8 |
| Team Rosie MacLennan (Light Blue) | Noa Kazado Yakar (ISR); Yonatan Fridman (ISR) | 9 | —N/a | | | 441 | 11 |
| Team Rosie MacLennan (Light Blue) | Sam Dick (NZL) | —N/a | 79 | —N/a | | 441 | 11 |
| Team Rosie MacLennan (Light Blue) | Gabriel Burtănete (ROU) | —N/a | 14 | —N/a | | 441 | 11 |
| Team Rosie MacLennan (Light Blue) | Yin Dehang (CHN) | —N/a | 32 | —N/a | | 441 | 11 |
| Team Rosie MacLennan (Light Blue) | Emma Spence (CAN) | —N/a | 26 | —N/a | | 441 | 11 |
| Team Rosie MacLennan (Light Blue) | Nazlı Savranbaşı (TUR) | —N/a | 57 | —N/a | | 441 | 11 |
| Team Rosie MacLennan (Light Blue) | Sofia Nair (ALG) | —N/a | 22 | —N/a | | 441 | 11 |
| Team Rosie MacLennan (Light Blue) | Tia Sobhy (EGY) | —N/a | | 99 | —N/a | 441 | 11 |
| Team Rosie MacLennan (Light Blue) | Azra Dewan (RSA) | —N/a | | 93 | —N/a | 441 | 11 |
| Team Rosie MacLennan (Light Blue) | Lina Wahada (TUN) | —N/a | | - | —N/a | 441 | 11 |
| Team Rosie MacLennan (Light Blue) | Benny Wizani (AUT) | —N/a | | | 8 | 441 | 11 |
| Team Rosie MacLennan (Light Blue) | Yuki Okuno (JPN) | —N/a | | | 10 | 441 | 11 |

== Judo ==
Algeria qualified two competitors based on the International Judo Federation World ranking list.

Boys

| Athlete | Event | Round of 16 | Quarterfinals | Semifinals | Final | |
| Athlete | Event | Opposition Result | Opposition Result | Opposition Result | Opposition Result | Rank |
|---|---|---|---|---|---|---|
| Ahmed Rebahi | −81 kg | Mohamed Fahmy (EGY); W 11s1–0s3 | Young (CAN); W 10s1–0 | Bezděk (CZE); L 0s1–1 | van Dijk (NED); L 1s2–10 | 5 |

Girls

| Athlete | Event | Round of 16 | Quarterfinals | Semifinals | Repechage | Final | |
| Athlete | Event | Opposition Result | Opposition Result | Opposition Result | Opposition Result | Opposition Result | Rank |
|---|---|---|---|---|---|---|---|
| Yassamine Djellab | −63 kg | Brothers (AUS); L 0s1–1s1 | Did not advance | | Bozkurt (TUR); L 0–10 | Did not advance | 9 |

Mixed team

| Athlete | Event | Round of 16 | Quarterfinals | Semifinals | Final | |
| Athlete | Event | Opposition Result | Opposition Result | Opposition Result | Opposition Result | Rank |
|---|---|---|---|---|---|---|
| Rio de Janeiro; Erza Muminoviq (KOS); Milana Charygulyyeva (TKM); Yassamine Djellab (ALG); Metka Lobnik (SLO); Jamshed Sulaimoni (TJK); Sultan Zhenishbekov (KGZ); Abrek Naguchev (RUS); Fleury Nihozeko (BDI) | Mixed team | Sydney (MIX); W 4–3 | Atlanta (MIX); W 5–4 | Athens (MIX); L 3–5 | Did not advance | 3rd place, bronze medalist(s) |
| London; Yangchen Wangmo (BHU); Noemi Huayhuameza Orneta (PER); Rachel Krapman (CAN); Edith Ortiz (ECU); Daniel Leutgeb (AUT); João Santos (BRA); Ahmed Rebahi (ALG); Bekarys Saduakas (KAZ) | Mixed team | Bye | Moscow (MIX); W 4–3 | Beijing (MIX); L 0–7 | Did not advance | 3rd place, bronze medalist(s) |

== Rowing ==
Algeria qualified 3 competitors (1 male and 2 female) for the games.

Boys

| Athlete | Event | Round 1 | | | Round 2 | | | Round 3 | | | Semifinals | | Final | |
| Athlete | Event | Heat | Time | Rank | Heat | Time | Rank | Heat | Time | Rank | Time | Rank | Time | Rank |
|---|---|---|---|---|---|---|---|---|---|---|---|---|---|---|
| Neil Nekkache | Single sculls | Bye | | | 4 | 1:54.50 | 3 | 2 | 1:49.44 | 3 | 1:45.20 | 2 | 1:43.30 | 4 |

Girls

| Athlete | Event | Round 1 | | | Round 2 | | | Round 3 | | | Semifinals | | Final | |
| Athlete | Event | Heat | Time | Rank | Heat | Time | Rank | Heat | Time | Rank | Time | Rank | Time | Rank |
|---|---|---|---|---|---|---|---|---|---|---|---|---|---|---|
| Nihed Benchadli; Rahma Amira Sebbouh | Pair | —N/a | 4:24.28 | 12 | 1 | 1:55.57 | 4 | 2 | 2:00.23 | 4 | —N/a | | 1:52.54 | 4 |

== Sailing ==
Algeria qualified two boats based on its performance at the African Techno 293+ Youth Olympic Games Qualifier.

Boys

| Athlete | Event | Race | | | | | | | | | | | | | Net points | Final rank |
| Athlete | Event | 1 | 2 | 3 | 4 | 5 | 6 | 7 | 8 | 9 | 10 | 11 | 12 | M* | Net points | Final rank |
|---|---|---|---|---|---|---|---|---|---|---|---|---|---|---|---|---|
| Imad Eddine Brighet | Techno 293+ | 16 | 19 | DNF | 19 | CAN | 19 | 22 | 22 | 20 | 22 | 21 | UDF | 23 | 203 | 23 |

Girls

| Athlete | Event | Race | | | | | | | | | | | | | Net points | Final rank |
| Athlete | Event | 1 | 2 | 3 | 4 | 5 | 6 | 7 | 8 | 9 | 10 | 11 | 12 | M* | Net points | Final rank |
|---|---|---|---|---|---|---|---|---|---|---|---|---|---|---|---|---|
| Lina Tessa Ait Ali Slimane | Techno 293+ | BFD | 22 | DNF | 22 | CAN | 21 | 23 | 21 | 21 | 23 | DNF | 20 | 21 | 194 | 22 |

== Swimming ==
Algeria qualified 3 competitors in swimming for the games.

Boys

| Athlete | Event | Heat | | Semifinal | | Final | |
| Athlete | Event | Time | Rank | Time | Rank | Time | Rank |
|---|---|---|---|---|---|---|---|
| Abdellah Ardjoune | 50 m backstroke | 26.38 | 11 Q | 26.64 | 13 | Did not advance | |
| Abdellah Ardjoune | 100 m backstroke | 56.93 | 13 Q | 56.86 | 14 | Did not advance | |
| Abdellah Ardjoune | 200 m backstroke | 2:04.91 | 14 | Did not advance | | | |
| Moncef Aymen Balamane | 50 m breaststroke | 29.30 | 19 | Did not advance | | | |
| Moncef Aymen Balamane | 100 m breaststroke | 1:03.72 | 15 Q | 1:03.35 | 13 | Did not advance | |
| Moncef Aymen Balamane | 200 m breaststroke | 2:22.61 | 24 | Did not advance | | | |
| Moncef Aymen Balamane | 200 m butterfly | 2:08.73 | 34 | Did not advance | | | |
| Moncef Aymen Balamane | 200 m individual medley | 2:04.39 | 5 Q | —N/a | | 2:04.17 | 5 |

Girls

| Athlete | Event | Heat | | Semifinal | | Final | |
| Athlete | Event | Time | Rank | Time | Rank | Time | Rank |
|---|---|---|---|---|---|---|---|
| Majda Chebaraka | 200 m freestyle | 2:10.39 | 32 | Did not advance | | | |

== Weightlifting ==
Algiera qualified two athletes based on its performance at the 2018 African Youth Championships.

| Athlete | Event | Snatch | | Clean & jerk | | Total | Rank |
| Athlete | Event | Result | Rank | Result | Rank | Total | Rank |
|---|---|---|---|---|---|---|---|
| Farid Saadi | Boys' +85 kg | 138 | 6 | 170 | 6 | 308 | 6 |
| Nour El Houda Sabri | Girls' 53 kg | 47 | 8 | 70 | 8 | 117 | 8 |

== Wrestling ==
Algeria qualified three wrestlers based on its performance at the 2018 African Cadet Championships.

Key:

- VT – Victory by fall.
- PP – Decision by points – the loser with technical points.
- PO – Decision by points – the loser without technical points.
- SP – Technical superiority – the loser with technical points and a margin of victory of at least 8 (Greco-Roman) or 10 (freestyle) points.
- ST – Great superiority – the loser without technical points and a margin of victory of at least 8 (Greco-Roman) or 10 (freestyle) points.

Boys' freestyle

| Athlete | Event | Preliminary | | Final / BM / CR | |
| Athlete | Event | Opposition Result | | Opposition Result | Rank |
| Athlete | Event | Match 1 | Match 2 | Opposition Result | Rank |
|---|---|---|---|---|---|
| Oussama Laribi | −55 kg | Whitt (GUM); W 10–0 ^{ST} | Almendra (ARG); L 4–5 ^{PP} | Ostapenko (UKR); L 0–10 ^{ST} | 4 |
| Fateh Benferdjallah | −80 kg | Yairegpie (FSM); W 10–0 ^{ST} | Lee (CAN); W 8–7 ^{PP} | Tembotov (RUS); L 0–10 ^{ST} | 2nd place, silver medalist(s) |

Boys' Greco-Roman

| Athlete | Event | Preliminary | | Final / BM | |
| Athlete | Event | Opposition Result | | Opposition Result | Rank |
| Athlete | Event | Match 1 | Match 2 | Opposition Result | Rank |
|---|---|---|---|---|---|
| Ahmed Abdelhakim Merikhi | −60 kg | Hovhannisyan (ARM); L 0–10 ^{ST} | Chkhikvadze (GEO); L 1–4 ^{SP} | Kellner (NZL); W 10–2 ^{SP} | 5 |
