= Great Britain at the 2018 Summer Youth Olympics =

- IOC code: GBR
- NOC: British Olympic Association
- Website: http://www.teamgb.com/

in Buenos Aires, Argentina 6 – 18 October 2018
- Competitors: 43 in 17 sports
- Medals Ranked 18th: Gold 3 Silver 4 Bronze 5 Total 12

Summer Youth Olympics appearances (overview)
- 2010; 2014; 2018; 2026

Great Britain participated at the 2018 Summer Youth Olympics in Buenos Aires, Argentina from 6 October to 18 October 2018.

== Archery ==
Great Britain qualified one archer based on its performance at the 2017 World Archery Youth Championships. Later, Great Britain qualified a male archer based on its performance at the 2018 European Youth Championships.

- Boys' Individual – Daniel Thompson
- Girls' Individual – Alyssia Tromans-Ansell

Individual

Athlete	Event	Ranking round		Round of 32	Round of 16	Quarterfinals	Semifinals	Final / BM	Rank
Athlete	Event	Score	Seed	Opposition Score	Opposition Score	Opposition Score	Opposition Score	Opposition Score	Rank
Dan Thompson	Boys' Individual	630	29	Vaca Cordero (MEX); L 0–6	did not advance				17
Alyssia Tromans-Ansell	Girls' Individual	652	10	Tagle (PHI); W 6–4	Vázquez Cadena (MEX); L 1–7	did not advance			9

Team

Athletes	Event	Ranking round		Round of 32	Round of 16	Quarterfinals	Semifinals	Final / BM	Rank
Athletes	Event	Score	Seed	Opposition Score	Opposition Score	Opposition Score	Opposition Score	Opposition Score	Rank
Dan Thompson (GBR); Son Yer-yeong (KOR)	Mixed team	1293	25	van der Winkel (NED); Cheremiskin (RUS); L 2–6	did not advance				17
Alyssia Tromans-Ansell (GBR); Reza Shabani (IRI)	Mixed team	1305	4	Himani (IND); Roux (RSA); W 5–1	Tagle (PHI); Õun (EST); L 3–5	did not advance			9

== Badminton ==
Great Britain qualified two players based on the Badminton Junior World Rankings.

- Boys' singles – Christopher Grimley
- Girls' singles – Grace King

Singles

Athlete	Event	Group stage				Quarterfinal	Semifinal	Final / BM	Rank
Athlete	Event	Opposition Score	Opposition Score	Opposition Score	Rank	Opposition Score	Opposition Score	Opposition Score	Rank
Christopher Grimley	Boys' Singles	Guo (NZL); W 2–0	Chen (TPE); L 0–2	Pápai (HUN); W 2–0	2	did not advance			9
Grace King	Girls' Singles	İnci (TUR); W 2–1	Hooi (SGP); W 2–1	Švábíková (CZE); L 0–2	3	did not advance			9

Team

Athlete	Event	Group stage				Quarterfinal	Semifinal	Final / BM	Rank
Athlete	Event	Opposition Score	Opposition Score	Opposition Score	Rank	Opposition Score	Opposition Score	Opposition Score	Rank
Team Zeta; Christopher Grimley (GBR); Danylo Bosniuk (UKR); Kettiya Keoxay (LAO); Nhat Nguyen (IRL); Maharani Sekar Batari (INA); Jaslyn Hooi (SGP); Nairoby Abigail Jiménez (DOM); Vivien Sándorházi (HUN)	Mixed Teams	Delta (MIX); L (95–110)	Epsilon (MIX); W (110–89)	Alpha (MIX); L (103–110)	3Q	Sigma (MIX); W (110–106)	Omega (MIX); L (109–110)	Theta (MIX); L (107–110)	4
Team Sigma; Grace King (GBR); Dennis Koppen (NED); Rukesh Maharjan (NEP); Ikhsan Rumbay (INA); Cristian Savin (MDA); Madeleine Caren Akoumba Ze (CMR); Ann-Kathrin Spöri (GER); Wang Zhiyi (CHN)	Mixed Teams	Theta (MIX); W (110–100)	Gamma (MIX); W (110–86)	Omega (MIX); L (98–110)	2Q	Zeta (MIX); L (106–110)	did not advance		5

== Beach volleyball ==
Great Britain qualified a boys' team based on their performance at 2017–18 European Youth Continental Cup Final.

- Boys' tournament – Javier Bello and Joaquin Bello.

Athletes	Event	Preliminary round		Round of 24	Round of 16	Quarterfinals	Semifinals	Final / BM	
Athletes	Event	Opposition Score	Rank	Opposition Score	Opposition Score	Opposition Score	Opposition Score	Opposition Score	Rank
Javier Bello; Joaquín Bello	Boys'	Ayon–Alayo (CUB); W 2-1; Krovon–Ariyata (TOG); W 2-0; Jorge–Gonza (PAR); W 2-0	1	Bye	James–Mark (AUS); W 2-0	Amieva–Zelayeta (ARG); L 0-2	did not advance		

== Boxing ==
Great Britain qualified three boxers based on their performance at the 2018 Youth European Confederation Boxing Championship.

- Boys' 52 kg – Ivan Hope Price
- Boys' 64 kg – Hassan Azim
- Boys' 81 kg – Karol Itauma
- Girls' 60 kg – Caroline Sara Dubois

Boys

Athlete	Event	Preliminary R1	Preliminary R2	Semifinals	Final / RM	Rank
Athlete	Event	Opposition Result	Opposition Result	Opposition Result	Opposition Result	Rank
Ivan Hope Price	-52 kg	Bye	Maouche (ALG); W 5–0	Clancy (IRL); W 5–0	Sukthet (THA); W RSC R1 1:49	1st place, gold medalist(s)
Hassan Azim	-64 kg	Jones (USA); W 4–1	—N/a	Popov (RUS); L 1–4	Boulaouja (MAR); W RSC R2 1:49	3rd place, bronze medalist(s)
Karol Itauma	-81 kg	Morales (PUR); W 5–0	—N/a	Ali Karar (EGY); W 5–0	Kolesnikov (RUS); W 4–1	1st place, gold medalist(s)

Girl

Athlete	Event	Preliminaries	Semifinals	Final / RM	Rank
Athlete	Event	Opposition Result	Opposition Result	Opposition Result	Rank
Caroline Dubois	-60 kg	Taghouti (TUN); W 5–0	Saputo (ARG); W 5–0	Buapa (THA); W 5–0	1st place, gold medalist(s)

== Cycling ==
Great Britain qualified a boys' and girls' combined team based on its ranking in the Youth Olympic Games Junior Nation Rankings. They also qualified a mixed BMX racing team based on its ranking in the Youth Olympic Games BMX Junior Nation Rankings.

- Boys' combined team – Sean Flynn and Harry Birchill.
- Girls' combined team – Harriet Harnden and Anna McGorum.
- Mixed BMX racing team – Ross Cullen and Elissa Bradford

== Diving ==
Great Britain qualified three divers at the 2018 World Junior Diving Championships.

- Boys' 3m Springboard – Antony Harding
- ~~Boys' 10 Platform – Antony Harding~~ (not used)
- Girls' 3m Springboard – Maria Papworth

Athlete	Event	Preliminary		Final	
Athlete	Event	Points	Rank	Points	Rank
Anthony Harding	Boys' 3 m springboard	534.95	2	559.50	2nd place, silver medalist(s)
Maria Papworth	Girls' 3 m springboard	369.85	12	428.95	4
Maria Papworth (GBR); Bryden Hattie (CAN)	Mixed team	—N/a		340.50	5
Ronja Rundgren (FIN); Anthony Harding (GBR)	Mixed team	—N/a		299.10	12

== Equestrian ==
Great Britain qualified a rider based on its performance at the FEI European Junior Jumping Championships.

- Individual Jumping – Jack Whitaker

== Golf ==
Great Britain have qualified a mixed team of one boy and one girl as a result of the World Amateur Golf Rankings as at 25 July 2018.

- Mixed team – Joe Pagdin and Lily May Humphreys.

Individual

Athlete	Event	Round 1		Round 2			Round 3			Total		
Athlete	Event	Score	Rank	Score	Total	Rank	Score	Total	Rank	Score	Par	Rank
Lily May Humphreys	Girls' Individual	79 (+9)	22	70 (0)	149	2	73 (+3)	222	7	222	+12	11
Joe Pagdin	Boys' Individual	71 (+1)	5	71 (+1)	142	8	WD			WD		

Team

Athletes	Event	Round 1 (Fourball)		Round 2 (Foursome)		Round 3 (Individual Stroke)				Total		
Athletes	Event	Score	Rank	Score	Rank	Girl	Boy	Total	Rank	Score	Par	Rank
Lily May Humphreys; Joe Pagdin	Mixed team	64 (−6)	6	73 (+3)	10	74	73	147 (+7)	9	284	+4	9

== Gymnastics ==
=== Acrobatic ===
Great Britain qualified a mixed pair based on its performance at the 2018 Acrobatic Gymnastics World Championship.

- Mixed pair – Clyde Gembickas and Sophia Imrie-Gale.

=== Artistic ===
Great Britain qualified two gymnasts based on its performance at the 2018 European Junior Championship.

- Boys' artistic individual all-around – Adam Tobin
- Girls' artistic individual all-around – Amelie Morgan

=== Trampoline ===
Great Britain qualified two gymnasts based on its performance at the 2018 European Junior Championship.

- Boys' trampoline – Andrew Stamp
- Girls' trampoline – Jessica Clarke

== Karate ==
Great Britain qualified one athlete based on the rankings in the Buenos Aires 2018 Olympic Standings. Later, they qualified a second athlete based on its performance at one of the Karate Qualification Tournaments.

- Girls' −59kg – Charlotte Hope
- Girls' +59kg – Lauren Salisbury

Athlete	Event	Elimination round				Semifinals	Final	
Athlete	Event	Opposition Score	Opposition Score	Opposition Score	Rank	Opposition Score	Opposition Score	Rank
Charlotte Hope	Girls' 59 kg	Oukhattou (FRA); L 0–4	Anna Chernysheva (RUS); L 0–4	Heydariozomcheloei (IRI); L 0–2	4	did not advance		
Lauren Salisbury	Girls' +59 kg	Keli Kydonaki (GRE); L 2-4	Annika Sælid (NOR); L 0-2	Sarah Al-Ameri (UAE); W 2-0	2	Sakura Sawashima (JPN); L 1-9	did not advance	3rd place, bronze medalist(s)

== Modern pentathlon ==
Great Britain qualified one athlete based on its performance at the 2018 Youth A World Championship.

- Boys' Individual – Toby Price
- Girls' Individual – Annabel Denton

== Rowing ==
Great Britain qualified two boats based on its performance at the 2017 World Junior Rowing Championships.

- Boys' pair – Michael Dalton and Theo Darlow.
- Girls' single sculls – Georgina Robinson Ranger

== Sailing ==
Great Britain qualified two boats based on its performance at the 2017 World Techno 293+ Championships.

- Boys' Techno 293+ – Finn Hawkins
- Girls' Techno 293+ – Islay Watson

== Shooting ==
Great Britain have received a wild card entry in the boy's air pistol event in the shooting competition.

- Boys' 10m Air Pistol – James Miller

Individual

Athlete	Event	Qualification		Final	
Athlete	Event	Points	Rank	Points	Rank
James Miller	Boys' 10 m air pistol	566-14	9	did not advance	

Mixed

Athlete	Event	Qualification		Round of 16	Quarterfinal	Semifinal	Final	
Athlete	Event	Points	Rank	Opposition Score	Opposition Score	Opposition Score	Opposition Score	Rank
Kateline Nicolas (FRA); James Miller (GBR)	Mixed 10 metre air pistol	739-12	14	Seeger (GER); Kirov (BUL); L 5–10	did not advance			

== Taekwondo ==
Great Britain have qualified two athletes for the taekwondo competition via the qualification tournament.

- Boys' −55kg – Mason Yarrow
- Girls' −49kg – Aaliyah Powell
- Girls' +63kg – Sharissa Gannaway

Athlete	Event	Round of 16	Quarterfinals	Semifinals	Final	
Athlete	Event	Opposition Score	Opposition Score	Opposition Score	Opposition Score	Rank
Mason Yarrow	Boys' 55 kg	Hidetaka Maeda (JPN); L (6-29)	did not advance			
Aaliyah Powell	Girls' 49 kg	Bye	Lee Ye-ji (KOR); L (14-21)	did not advance		
Sharissa Gannaway	Girls' +63 kg	Bye	Kimia Hemati (IRI); L (8-19)	did not advance		

== Triathlon ==
Great Britain qualified two athletes based on its performance at the 2018 European Youth Olympic Games Qualifier.

Individual

Athlete	Event	Swim (750m)	Trans 1	Bike (20 km)	Trans 2	Run (5 km)	Total Time	Rank
Calum Young	Boys	9:36	0:31	27:34	0:27	17:04	55:12	10
Libby Coleman	Girls	10:29	0:49	31:22	0:32	20:31	1:03:43	23

Relay

Athlete	Event	Total Times per Athlete (Swim 250m, Bike 6.6 km, Run 1.8 km)	Total Group Time	Rank
Europe 4 Hanne Peeters (BEL); Gergely Kiss (HUN); Nikolett Ferenczi (HUN); Calum Young (GBR)	Mixed Relay	23:01 (9); 21:00 (4); 23:42 (5); 21:38 (5)	1:29:21	4
Europe 6 Ines Rico (POR); Jan Škrjanc (SLO); Libby Coleman (GBR); Rik Malcorps (BEL)	Mixed Relay	23:01 (10); 21:27 (7); 23:14 (4); 21:53 (6)	1:29:21	5

== Weightlifting ==
Athlete	Event	Snatch		Clean & jerk		Total	Rank
Athlete	Event	Result	Rank	Result	Rank	Total	Rank
Ellie Pryor	Girls' −53 kg	61	6	81	5	142	6
