= Athletics at the 2018 Summer Youth Olympics – Girls' 400 metre hurdles =

Girls' 400 metre hurdles at the III Summer Youth Olympic Games
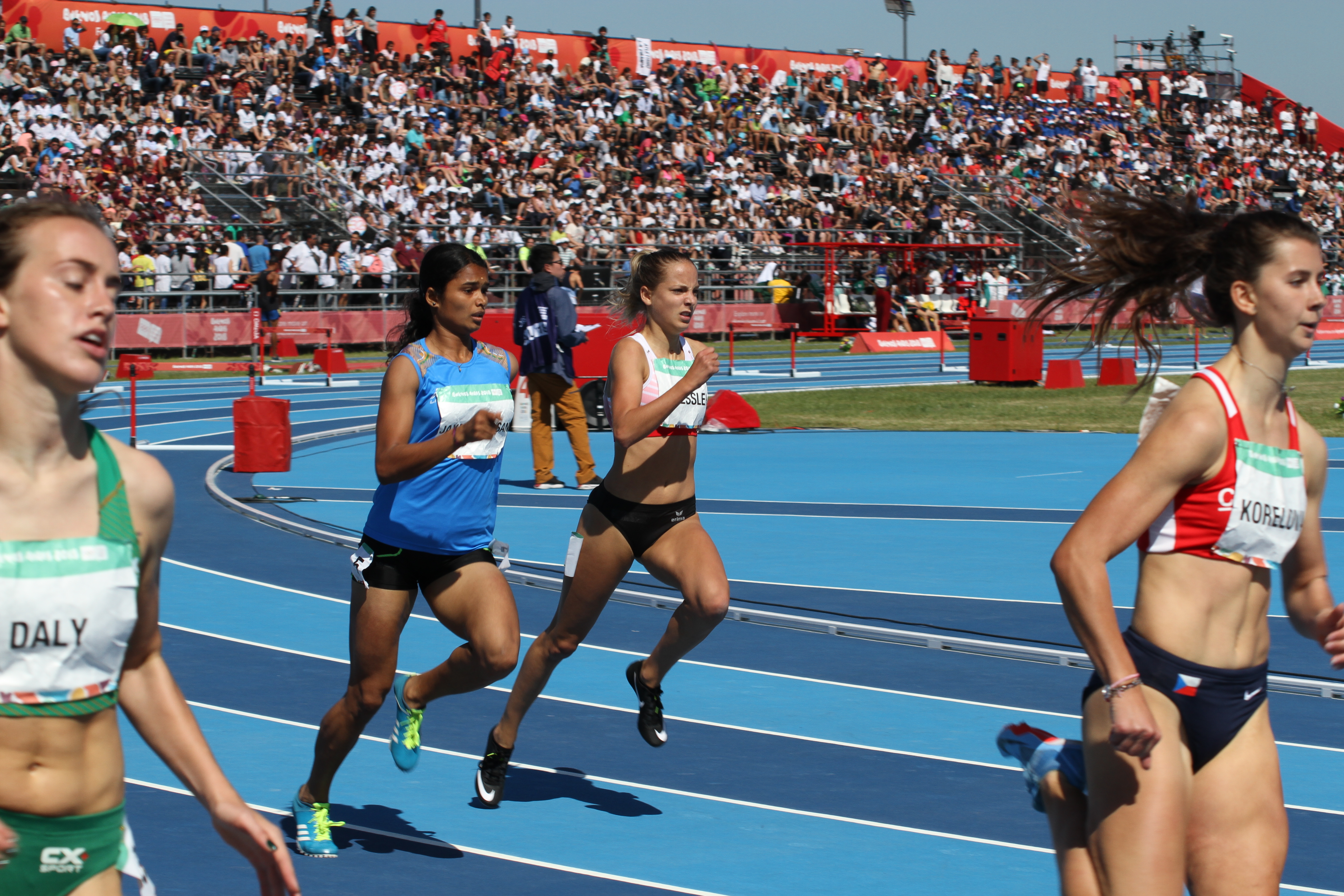
- Venue: Parque Polideportivo Roca
- Date: 13, 16 October
- Competitors: 19 from 19 nations

Medalists
1st place, gold medalist(s)		Valeria Cabezas	Colombia
2nd place, silver medalist(s)		Loubna Benhadja	Algeria
3rd place, bronze medalist(s)		Carla García	Spain

The girls' 400 metre hurdles metres competition at the 2018 Summer Youth Olympics was held on 13 and 16 October, at the Parque Polideportivo Roca.

== Schedule ==
All times are in local time (UTC-3).

Date	Time	Round
13 October 2018	14:50	Stage 1
16 October 2018	14:55	Stage 2

== Results ==
=== Stage 1 ===
Rank	Heat	Lane	Athlete	Nation	Result	Notes
1	1	8	Valeria Cabezas	Colombia	59.19	QH3
2	3	5	Jéssica Moreira	Brazil	59.41	QH3, PB
3	1	3	Carla García	Spain	1:00.84	QH3
4	3	7	Emma Silvestri	Italy	1:00.88	QH3
5	2	4	Julia Lovsin	Canada	1:00.95	QH3
6	1	4	Loubna Benhadja	Algeria	1:00.98	QH3
7	2	3	Gisèle Wender	Germany	1:01.16	QH3
8	3	4	Yara Amador	Mexico	1:01.63	QH3
9	3	2	Kristýna Korelová	Czech Republic	1:01.84	QH2
10	1	2	Lena Pressler	Austria	1:01.85	QH2
11	2	7	Vishnu Priya Jayaprakasan	India	1:02.56	QH2
12	2	2	Yang Jui-hsuan	Chinese Taipei	1:02.65	QH2
13	1	6	Miriam Daly	Ireland	1:02.72	QH2
14	2	5	Kia Laisi	Finland	1:03.23	QH2
15	3	3	Gontse Morake	South Africa	1:04.35	QH1
16	3	6	Ariana Rivera	Nicaragua	1:05.72	QH1, PB
17	1	7	Phailin Khonepaseuth	Laos	1:09.68	QH1, PB
18	1	5	Evedieu Samba	Republic of the Congo	1:10.63	QH1, PB
19	2	6	Aminata Kaboré	Burkina Faso	1:12.05	QH1

=== Stage 2 ===
Rank	Heat	Lane	Athlete	Nation	Result	Notes
1	3	3	Valeria Cabezas	Colombia	58.39	
2	3	2	Loubna Benhadja	Algeria	59.70	PB
3	3	8	Julia Lovsin	Canada	59.89	PB
4	3	1	Yara Amador	Mexico	59.91	PB
5	3	4	Carla García	Spain	59.92	
6	1	3	Gontse Morake	South Africa	59.95	
7	3	6	Emma Silvestri	Italy	1:00.62	
8	3	7	Gisèle Wender	Germany	1:01.02	
9	2	3	Yang Jui-hsuan	Chinese Taipei	1:01.04	
10	2	6	Kristýna Korelová	Czech Republic	1:01.13	
11	2	4	Lena Pressler	Austria	1:01.33	
12	2	5	Vishnu Priya Jayaprakasan	India	1:01.92	
13	2	8	Miriam Daly	Ireland	1:02.15	
14	1	6	Ariana Rivera	Nicaragua	1:06.03	
15	3	5	Jéssica Moreira	Brazil	1:06.13	
16	1	5	Evedieu Samba	Republic of the Congo	1:08.15	PB
17	1	7	Aminata Kaboré	Burkina Faso	1:08.26	
18	1	4	Phailin Khonepaseuth	Laos	1:09.49	PB
	2	7	Kia Laisi	Finland	DNS	

=== Final placing ===
Rank	Athlete	Nation	Stage 1	Stage 2	Total
1st place, gold medalist(s)	Valeria Cabezas	Colombia	59.19	58.39	1:57.58
2nd place, silver medalist(s)	Loubna Benhadja	Algeria	1:00.98	59.70	2:00.68
3rd place, bronze medalist(s)	Carla García	Spain	1:00.84	59.92	2:00.76
4	Julia Lovsin	Canada	1:00.95	59.89	2:00.84
5	Emma Silvestri	Italy	1:00.88	1:00.62	2:01.50
6	Yara Amador	Mexico	1:01.63	59.91	2:01.54
7	Gisèle Wender	Germany	1:01.16	1:01.02	2:02.18
8	Kristýna Korelová	Czech Republic	1:01.84	1:01.13	2:02.97
9	Lena Pressler	Austria	1:01.85	1:01.33	2:03.18
10	Yang Jui-hsuan	Chinese Taipei	1:02.65	1:01.04	2:03.69
11	Gontse Morake	South Africa	1:04.35	59.95	2:04.30
12	Vishnu Priya Jayaprakasan	India	1:02.56	1:01.92	2:04.48
13	Miriam Daly	Ireland	1:02.72	1:02.15	2:04.87
14	Jéssica Moreira	Brazil	59.41	1:06.13	2:05.54
15	Ariana Rivera	Nicaragua	1:05.72	1:06.03	2:11.75
16	Evedieu Samba	Republic of the Congo	1:10.63	1:08.15	2:18.78
17	Phailin Khonepaseuth	Laos	1:09.68	1:09.49	2:19.17
18	Aminata Kaboré	Burkina Faso	1:12.05	1:08.26	2:20.31
	Kia Laisi	Finland	1:03.23	DNS	
