= Ireland at the 2018 Summer Youth Olympics =

- IOC code: IRL
- NOC: Olympic Council of Ireland
- Website: http://www.olympics.ie/

in Buenos Aires, Argentina 6 – 18 October 2018
- Competitors: 17
- Medals Ranked 71st: Gold 0 Silver 1 Bronze 2 Total 3

Summer Youth Olympics appearances
- 2010; 2014; 2018; 2026

Ireland participated at the 2018 Summer Youth Olympics in Buenos Aires, Argentina from 6 October to 18 October 2018.

== Athletics ==
Track
Athlete	Event	Time		Total	Rank
Athlete	Event	Stage 1	Stage 2	Total	Rank
Miriam Daly	Girls 400m Hurdles	1:02.72	1:02.15	2:04.87	13th

Field
Athlete	Event	Mark		Total	Rank
Athlete	Event	Stage 1	Stage 2	Total	Rank
Sophie Meredith	Girls Long Jump	5.59	5.78	11.37	10th
Miranda Tcheutchoua	Girls Hammer Throw	54.65	51.95	106.60	14th

== Badminton ==
Ireland qualified one player based on the Badminton Junior World Rankings.

Singles

Athlete	Event	Group stage				Quarterfinal	Semifinal	Final / BM	Rank
Athlete	Event	Opposition Score	Opposition Score	Opposition Score	Rank	Opposition Score	Opposition Score	Opposition Score	Rank
Nhat Nguyen	Boys' Singles	Keoxay (LAO); W (21–11, 21–6)	Delmastro (ARG); W (21–8, 21–5)	Canjura (ESA); W (21–4, 21–11)	1Q	Li (CHN); L (21–15, 19–21, 19–21)	did not advance		5

Team

Athlete	Event	Group stage				Quarterfinal	Semifinal	Final / BM	Rank
Athlete	Event	Opposition Score	Opposition Score	Opposition Score	Rank	Opposition Score	Opposition Score	Opposition Score	Rank
Team Zeta; Nhat Nguyen (IRL); Danylo Bosniuk (UKR); Christopher Grimley (GBR); Kettiya Keoxay (LAO); Maharani Sekar Batari (INA); Jaslyn Hooi (SGP); Nairoby Abigail Jiménez (DOM); Vivien Sándorházi (HUN)	Mixed Teams	Delta (MIX); L (95–110)	Epsilon (MIX); W (110–89)	Alpha (MIX); L (103–110)	3Q	Sigma (MIX); W (110–106)	Omega (MIX); L (109–110)	Theta (MIX); L (107–110)	4

== Boxing ==
Boys

Athlete	Event	Preliminary R1	Preliminary R2	Semifinals	Final / RM	Rank
Athlete	Event	Opposition Result	Opposition Result	Opposition Result	Opposition Result	Rank
Dean Clancy	-52 kg	Maouche (ALG); W 5–0	—N/a	Price (GBR); L 0–5	de Oliveira (BRA); L 0–5	4

Girls

Athlete	Event	Preliminaries	Semifinals	Final / RM	Rank
Athlete	Event	Opposition Result	Opposition Result	Opposition Result	Rank
Dearbhla Rooney	-57 kg	Martinez (USA); W 5–0	Somnuek (THA); L 1–4	Shelford-Edmonds (NZL); W 5–0	3rd place, bronze medalist(s)
Lauren Kelly	-75 kg	Shamonova (RUS); L 0–5	did not advance		5

== Diving ==
Athlete	Event	Preliminary		Final	
Athlete	Event	Score	Rank	Score	Rank
Tanya Watson	Girls 10m Platform	357.00	6	362.45	5

== Golf ==
Individual

Athlete	Event	Round 1		Round 2			Round 3			Total		
Athlete	Event	Score	Rank	Score	Total	Rank	Score	Total	Rank	Score	Par	Rank
Lauren Walsh	Girls' Individual	75 (+5)	11	73 (+3)	148	9	75 (+5)	223	2	223	+13	13
David Kitt	Boys' Individual	80 (+10)	28	78 (+8)	158	26	77 (+7)	235	22	235	+25	25

Team

Athletes	Event	Round 1 (Fourball)		Round 2 (Foursome)		Round 3 (Individual Stroke)				Total		
Athletes	Event	Score	Rank	Score	Rank	Girl	Boy	Total	Rank	Score	Par	Rank
Lauren Walsh; David Kitt	Mixed team	63 (−7)	5	72 (+2)	8	74	77	151 (+11)	24	286	+6	13

== Gymnastics ==
Ireland qualified one gymnast based on its performance at the 2018 European Junior Championship.

Athlete	Event	Apparatus				Total	Rank
Athlete	Event	V	UB	BB	FX	Total	Rank
Emma Slevin	All-around	13.433	12.700	12.233	12.133	50.499	6

== Karate ==
Ireland qualified one contestant

- Boys' +68 kg - Sean McCarthy

Athlete	Event	Group Stage				Semifinal	Final / BM	
Athlete	Event	Opposition Score	Opposition Score	Opposition Score	Rank	Opposition Score	Opposition Score	Rank
Sean McCarthy Crean	Boys' +68 kg	Navid Mohammadi (IRI); L 2–5	Keisei Sakiyama (JPN); W 2–1	Tomáš Kósa (SVK); W 3–2	1	Nabil Ech-Chaabi (MAR); L 1–2	did not advance	3rd place, bronze medalist(s)

== Swimming ==
Athlete	Event	Heats		Semifinals		Final	
Athlete	Event	Time	Rank	Time	Rank	Time	Rank
Mona McSharry	Girls 50m Breastroke	31.78	2 Q	32.01	6 Q	31.96	4
Mona McSharry	Girls 100m Breastroke	1:09.24	2 Q	1:09.74	8 Q	1:08.97	4
Mona McSharry	Girls 200m Breastroke	DNS		Did Not Advance			
Mona McSharry	Girls 50m Freestyle	25.76	5 Q	25.42	2 Q	25.54	5
Niamh Coyne	Girls 50m Breastroke	31.90	5 Q	31.80	4 Q	32.02	5
Niamh Coyne	Girls 100m Breastroke	1:09.49	4 Q	1:08.90	3 Q	1:08.90	2nd place, silver medalist(s)
Niamh Coyne	Girls 200m Breastroke	2:33.27	18	Did Not Advance			
Robert Powell	Boys 50m Freestyle	23.77	22	Did Not Advance			
Robert Powell	Boys 100m Freestyle	51.19	15 Q	50.76	11	Did Not Advance	
Robert Powell	Boys 50m Butterfly	26.35	45	Did Not Advance			

== Tennis ==
Athlete	Event	Round of 32	Round of 16	Quarterfinals	Semifinals	Final / BM
Athlete	Event	Opposition Score	Opposition Score	Opposition Score	Opposition Score	Opposition Score
Georgia Drummy	Girls' singles	V Ivanov (NZL); W (6–0, 7–5, 6–3)	D Vismane (LAT); L (2–6, 2–6)	did not advance		
G Drummy (IRL); A Makatsaria (GEO)	Girls' doubles	—N/a	Y Naito (JPN); N Sato (JPN); L (1–6, 5–7)	did not advance		
Delmas Ntcha (BEN); Georgia Drummy (IRL)	Mixed doubles	Sato (JPN); Soares Klier Junior (BRA); L 0–2	did not advance			
