= Boxing at the 2018 Summer Youth Olympics – Boys' flyweight =

Boxing competitions

Boys' flyweight boxing at the III Summer Youth Olympic Games
- Venue: Oceania Pavilion
- Date: 14–17 October
- Competitors: 6 from 6 nations

Medalists
1st place, gold medalist(s)		Ivan Price	Great Britain
2nd place, silver medalist(s)		Sarawut Sukthet	Thailand
3rd place, bronze medalist(s)		Luiz de Oliveira	Brazil

The boys' flyweight boxing competition at the 2018 Summer Youth Olympics in Buenos Aires was held from 14 to 17 October at the Oceania Pavilion.

== Schedule ==
All times are local (UTC−3).

Date	Time	Round
Sunday, 14 October	13:01	Preliminary Round 1
Monday, 15 October	12:58	Preliminary Round 2
Tuesday, 16 October	13:01	Semifinals
Wednesday, 17 October	13:14	Finals

== Results ==
Preliminary Round 1
Hichem Maouche (ALG)	0
Dean Clancy (IRL)	5
Sarawut Sukthet (THA)	5
Sultan Naeemi (AFG)	0

Preliminary Round 2
Ivan Price (GBR)	5
Hichem Maouche (ALG)	0
Sultan Naeemi (AFG)
Luiz de Oliveira (BRA)	WO

Semifinals
Dean Clancy (IRL)	0
Ivan Price (GBR)	5
Luiz de Oliveira (BRA)	1
Sarawut Sukthet (THA)	4
Fifth place
Hichem Maouche (ALG)	WO
Sultan Naeemi (AFG)

Final
Ivan Price (GBR)	RSC
Sarawut Sukthet (THA)
Third place
Dean Clancy (IRL)	0
Luiz de Oliveira (BRA)	5

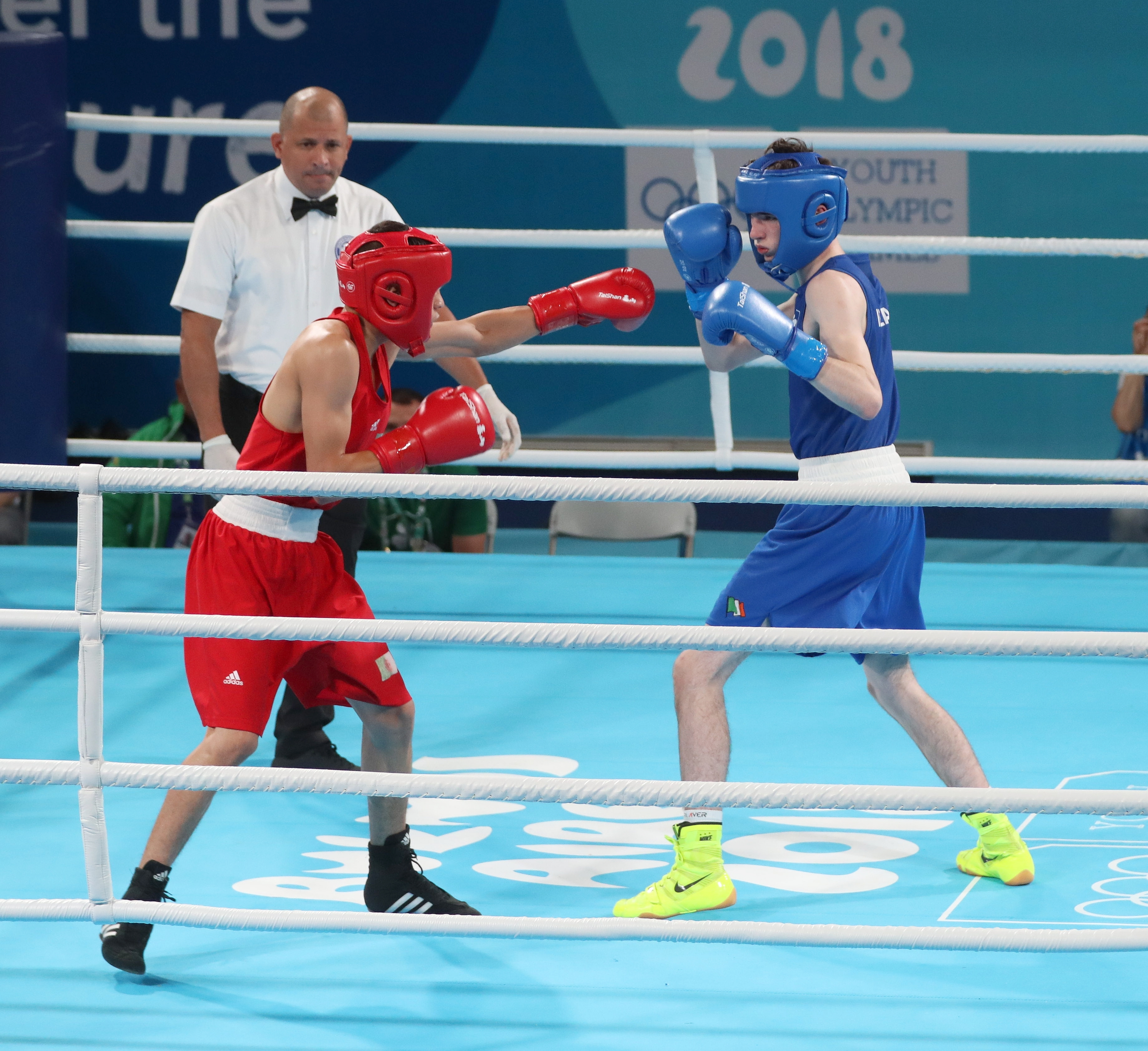
Hichem Maouche (Algeria; left) vs. Dean Clancy (Ireland) in the Preliminary Round 1 match

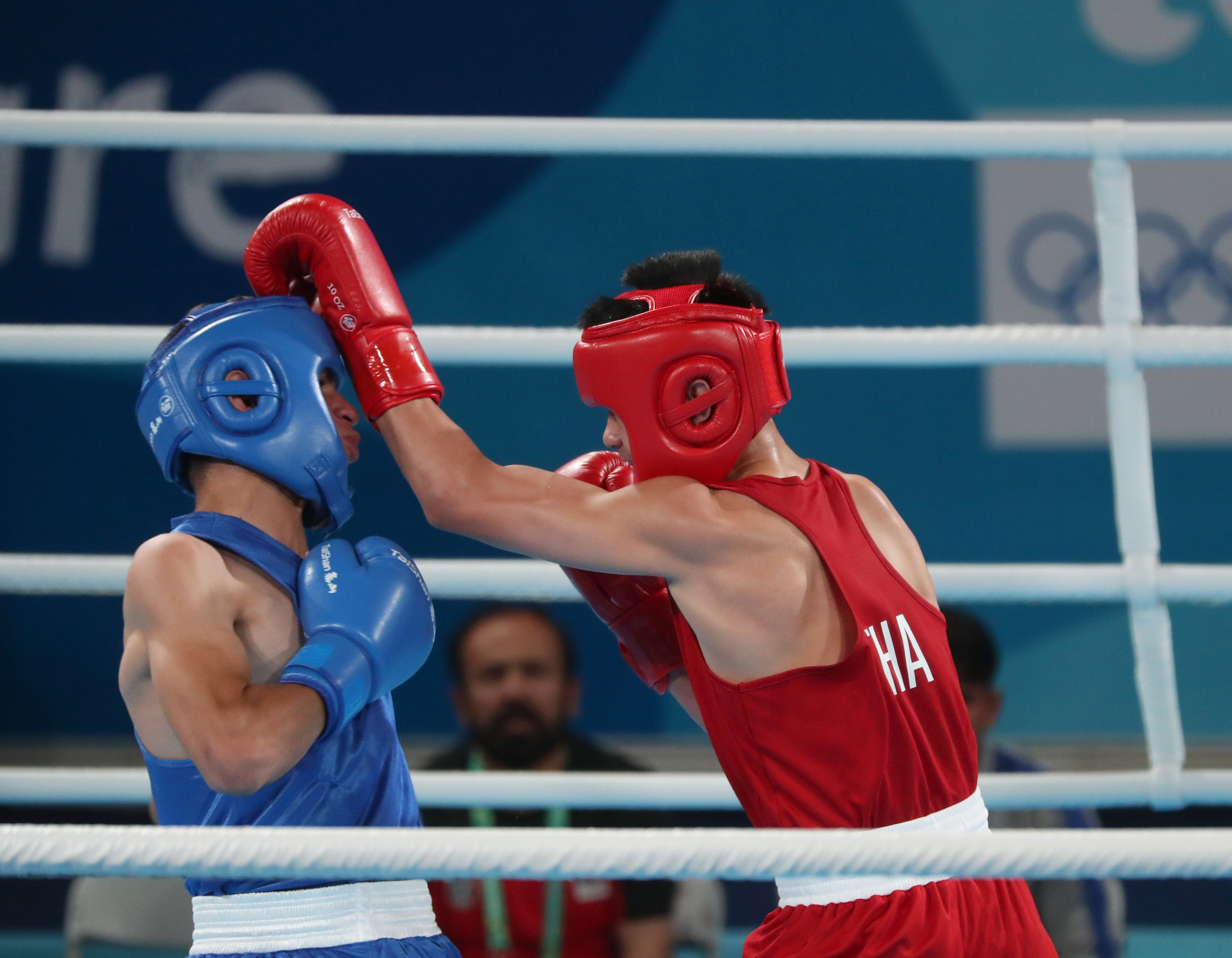
Sarawut Sukthet (Thailand; right) vs. Sultan Naeemi (Afghanistan) in the Preliminary Round 1 match

== Final standings ==
Rank	Athlete
1st place, gold medalist(s)	Ivan Price (GBR)
2nd place, silver medalist(s)	Sarawut Sukthet (THA)
3rd place, bronze medalist(s)	Luiz de Oliveira (BRA)
4	Dean Clancy (IRL)
5	Hichem Maouche (ALG)
6	Sultan Naeemi (AFG)
