= Congo at the 2018 Summer Youth Olympics =

Congo at the 2018 Summer Youth Olympics may refer to:

- Republic of the Congo at the 2018 Summer Youth Olympics
- Democratic Republic of the Congo at the 2018 Summer Youth Olympics
