= Badminton at the 2018 Summer Youth Olympics – Boys' singles =

Badminton championships

Boys' singles at the III Summer Youth Olympic Games
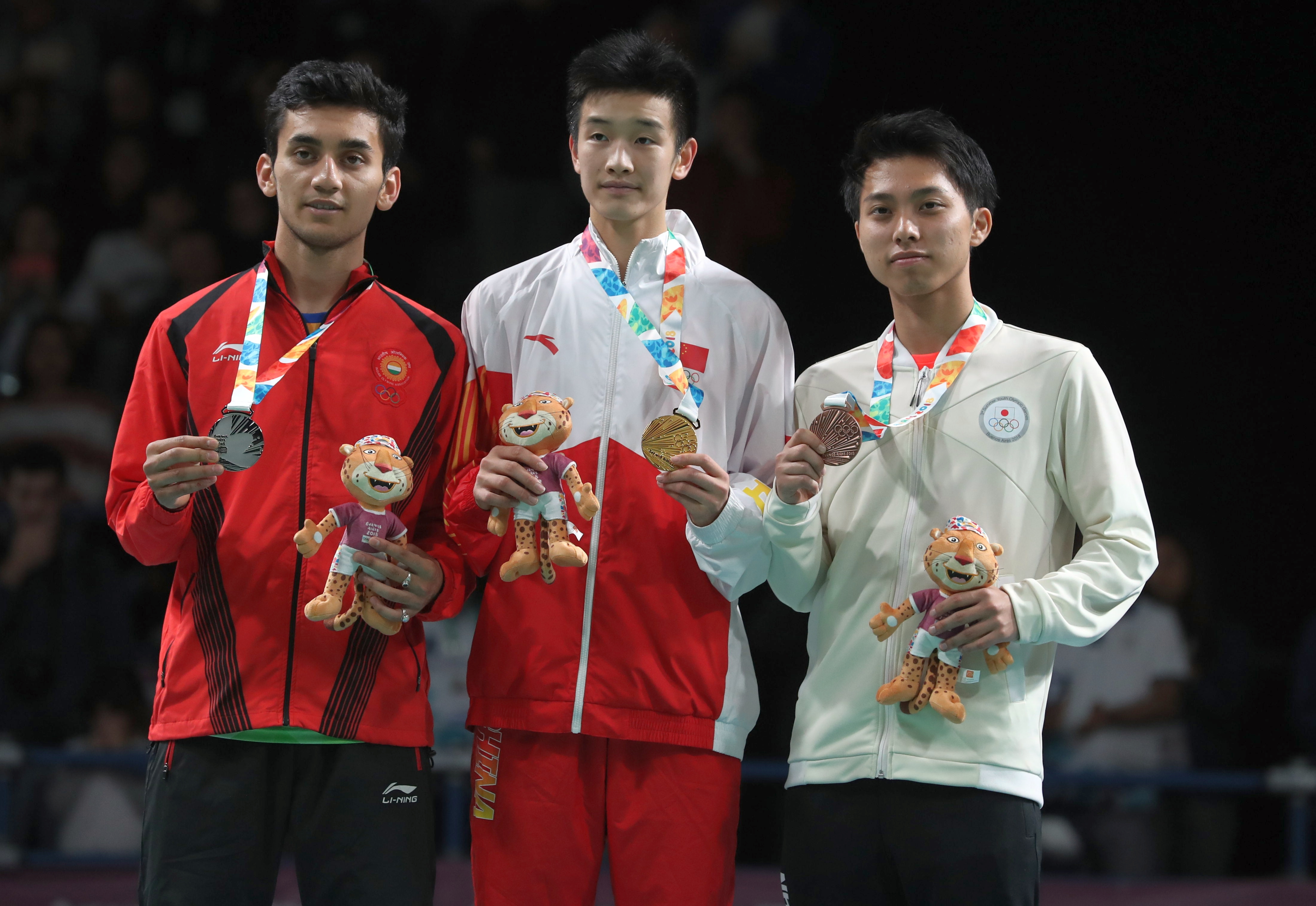
- The medalists
- Venue: Tecnópolis
- Dates: October 7–12
- Competitors: 32 from 32 nations

Medalists
1st place, gold medalist(s)		Li Shifeng	China
2nd place, silver medalist(s)		Lakshya Sen	India
3rd place, bronze medalist(s)		Kodai Naraoka	Japan

These are the results for the boys' singles event at the 2018 Summer Youth Olympics.

== Seeds ==
1. Kunlavut Vitidsarn (THA) (quarter-finals)
2. Kodai Naraoka (JPN) (bronze medal)
3. Nhat Nguyen (IRL) (quarter-finals)
4. Lakshya Sen (IND) (silver medal)
5. Li Shifeng (CHN) (gold medal)
6. Ikhsan Rumbay (INA) (quarter-finals)
7. Arnaud Merklé (FRA) (fourth place)
8. Chen Shiau-cheng (TPE) (quarter-finals)
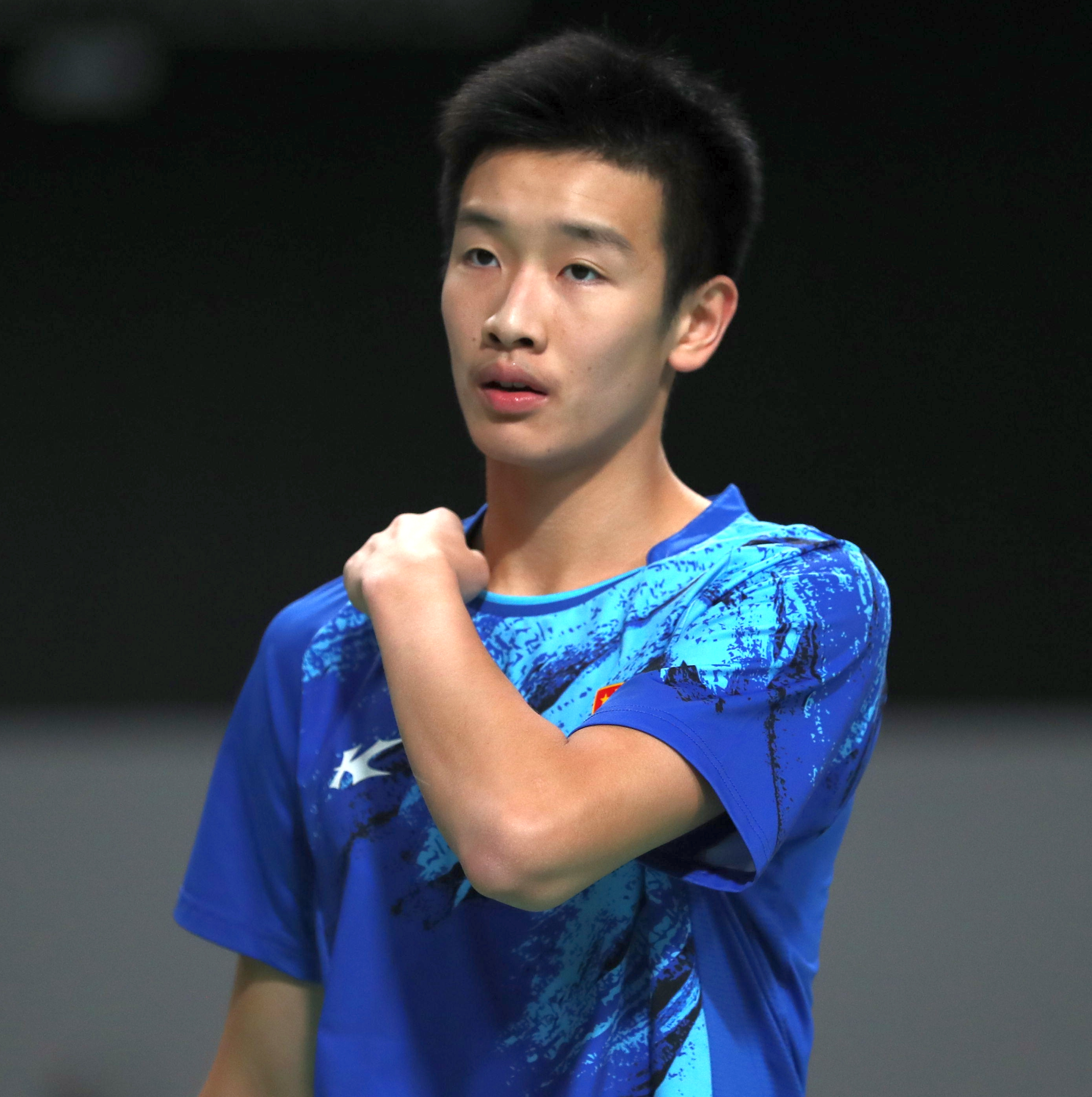
Li Shifeng

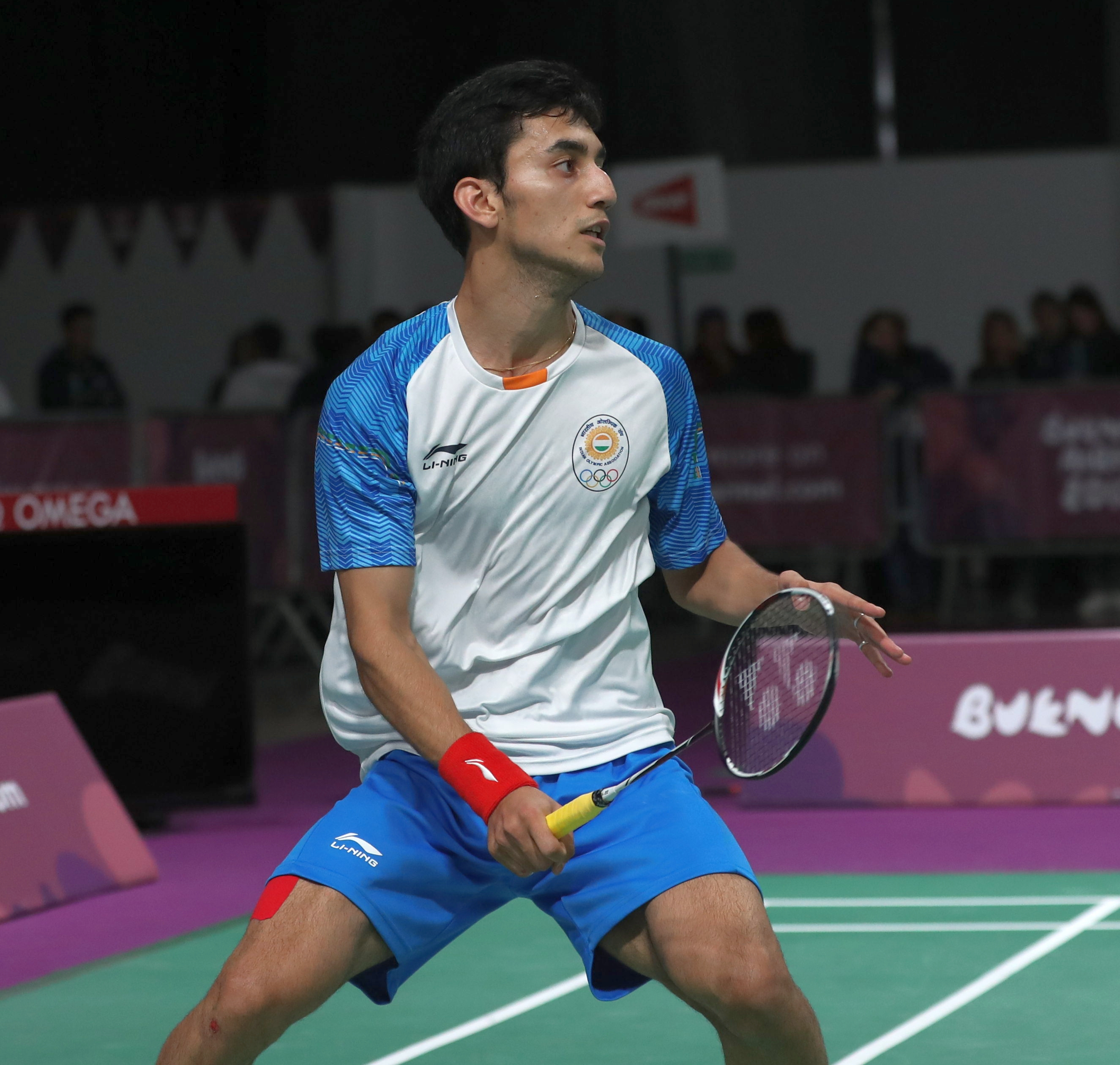
Lakshya Sen

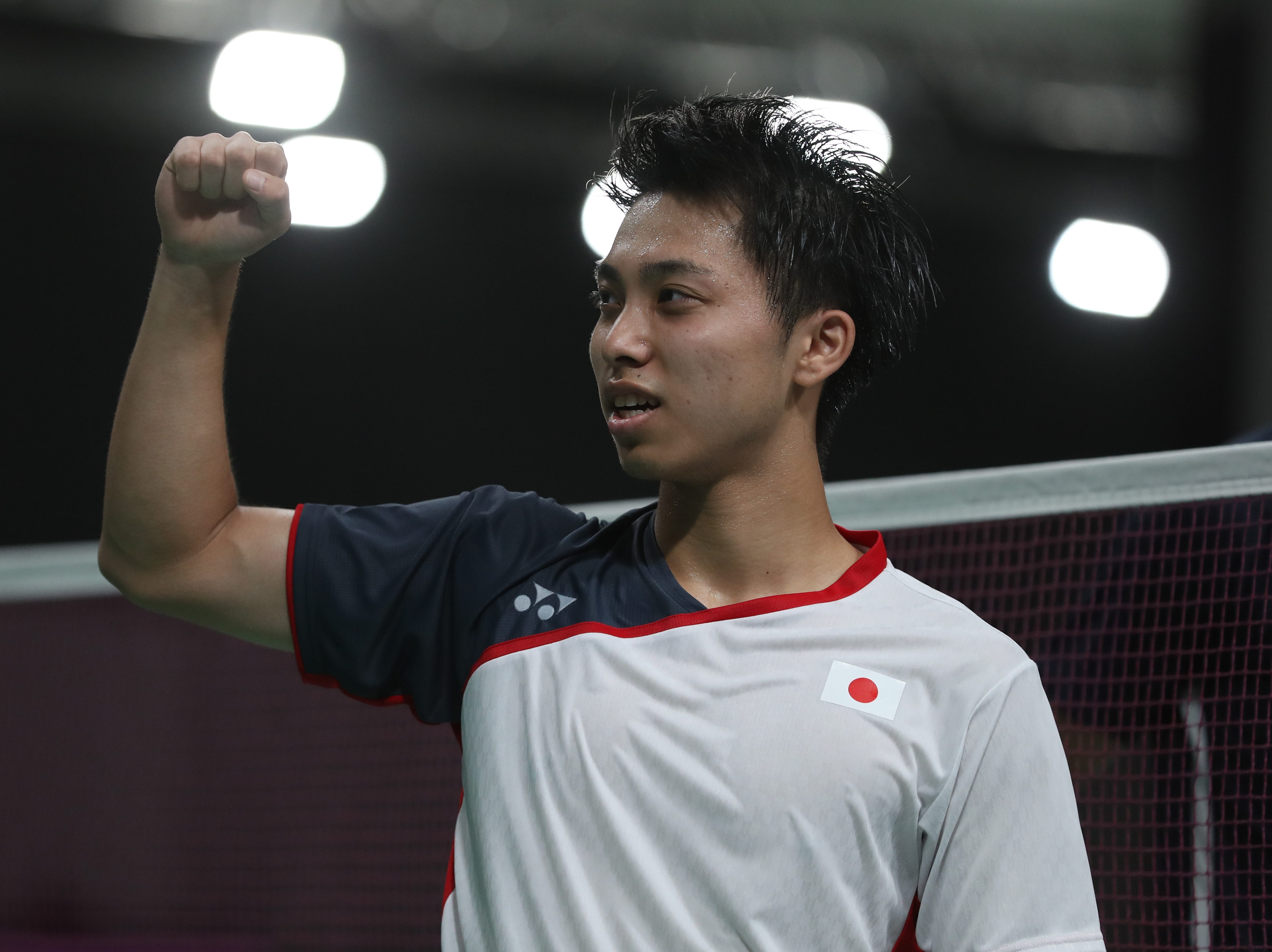
Kodai Naraoka

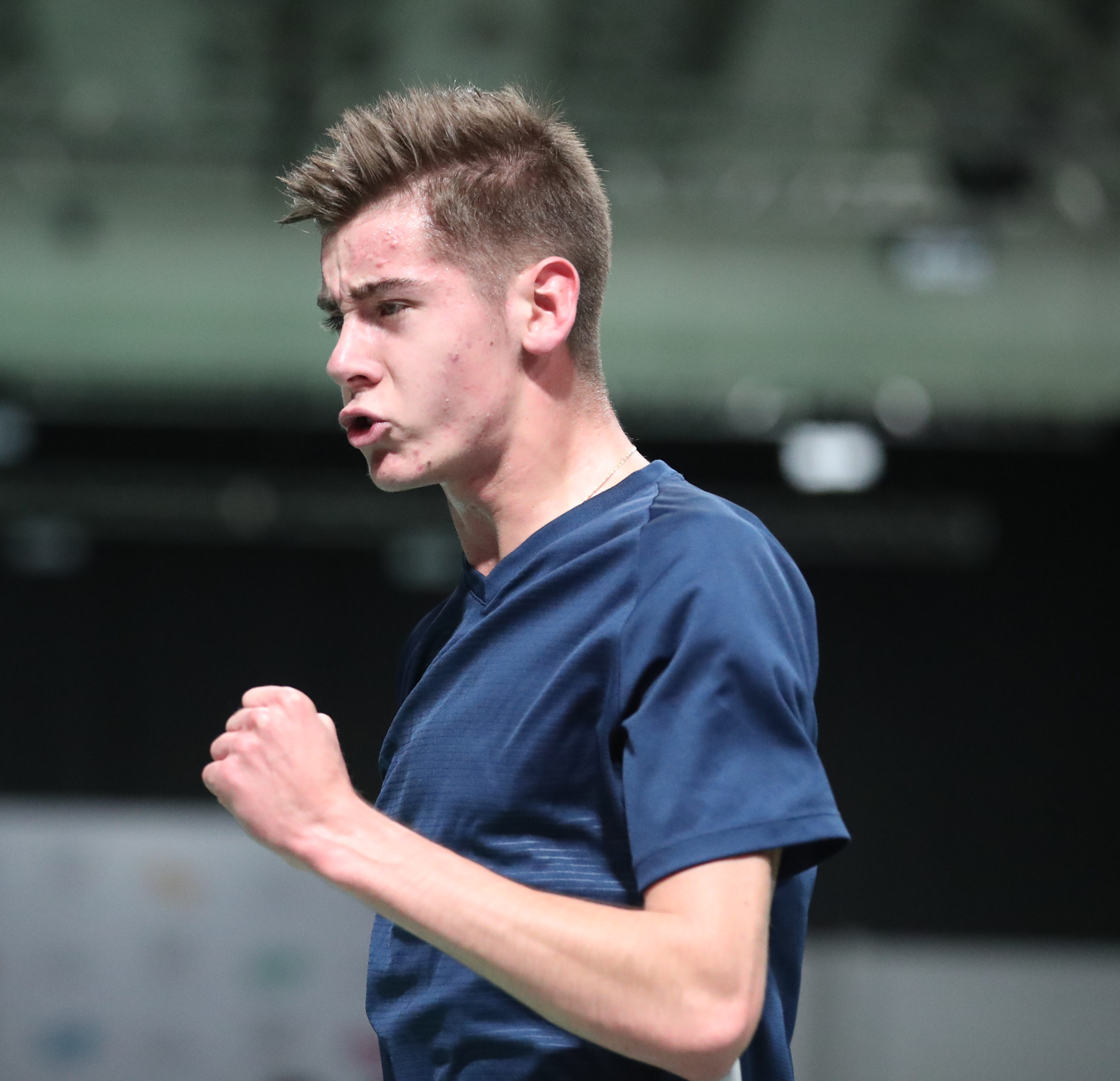
Arnaud Merklé

== Results ==
=== Group stage ===
Key to colours in group tables
Player advancing to knockout stage

==== Group A ====
Athlete	Matches			Sets			Points			Notes
Athlete	W	L	Tot	W	L	Diff	W	L	Diff	Notes
Kunlavut Vitidsarn (THA)	2	0	2	4	0	+4	84	49	+35	
Joel Koh (SGP)	1	1	2	2	2	0	74	51	+23	
Vannthoun Vath (CAM)	0	2	2	0	4	-4	26	84	-58	
Rukesh Maharjan (NEP)	0	0	0	0	0	0	0	0	0	WDN

Sunday, 7 October
9:00
Kunlavut Vitidsarn (THA)	2–0	Vannthoun Vath (CAM)	21–9, 21–8	19 min	Court 1
11:20
Joel Koh (SGP)	0–0	Rukesh Maharjan (NEP)	21–7, 21–9	25 min	Court 1
Monday, 8 October
10:10
Kunlavut Vitidsarn (THA)	no match	Rukesh Maharjan (NEP)
10:45
Joel Koh (SGP)	2–0	Vannthoun Vath (CAM)	21–3, 21–6	21 min	Court 2
Tuesday, 9 October
9:00
Rukesh Maharjan (NEP)	no match	Vannthoun Vath (CAM)
10:45
Kunlavut Vitidsarn (THA)	2–0	Joel Koh (SGP)	21–14, 21–18	43 min	Court 2

==== Group B ====
Athlete	Matches			Sets			Points		
Athlete	W	L	Tot	W	L	Diff	W	L	Diff
Arnaud Merklé (FRA)	3	0	3	6	2	+4	161	119	+42
Lukas Resch (GER)	2	1	3	5	3	+2	142	134	+8
Brian Yang (CAN)	1	2	3	3	5	-2	133	160	-27
Markus Barth (NOR)	0	3	3	2	6	-4	133	156	-23

Sunday, 7 October
10:45
Arnaud Merklé (FRA)	2–0	Markus Barth (NOR)	21–19, 21–12	30 min	Court 2
11:20
Brian Yang (CAN)	0–2	Lukas Resch (GER)	13–21, 18–21	27 min	Court 2
Monday, 8 October
9:00
Brian Yang (CAN)	2–1	Markus Barth (NOR)	17–21, 21–19, 21–19	47 min	Court 1
9:00
Arnaud Merklé (FRA)	2–1	Lukas Resch (GER)	21–12, 18–21, 21–12	44 min	Court 3
Tuesday, 9 October
9:00
Arnaud Merklé (FRA)	2–1	Brian Yang (CAN)	21–15, 17–21, 21–7	40 min	Court 1
11:20
Lukas Resch (GER)	2–1	Markus Barth (NOR)	21–10, 13–21, 21–12	35 min	Court 1

==== Group C ====
Athlete	Matches			Sets			Points		
Athlete	W	L	Tot	W	L	Diff	W	L	Diff
Nhat Nguyen (IRL)	3	0	3	6	0	+6	126	45	+81
Uriel Canjura (ESA)	2	1	3	4	2	+2	99	85	+14
Kettiya Keoxay (LAO)	1	2	3	2	5	-3	102	134	-32
Mateo Delmastro (ARG)	0	3	3	1	6	-5	82	145	-63

Sunday, 7 October
9:35
Uriel Canjura (ESA)	2–0	Mateo Delmastro (ARG)	21–6, 21–13	27 min	Court 3
10:10
Nhat Nguyen (IRL)	2–0	Kettiya Keoxay (LAO)	21–11, 21–6	24 min	Court 1
Monday, 8 October
9:35
Nhat Nguyen (IRL)	2–0	Mateo Delmastro (ARG)	21–8, 21–5	23 min	Court 2
11:20
Uriel Canjura (ESA)	2–0	Kettiya Keoxay (LAO)	21–9, 21–15	26 min	Court 3
Tuesday, 9 October
10:10
Mateo Delmastro (ARG)	1–2	Kettiya Keoxay (LAO)	21–19, 10–21, 19–21	42 min	Court 3
11:20
Nhat Nguyen (IRL)	2–0	Uriel Canjura (ESA)	21–4, 21–11	26 min	Court 3

==== Group D ====
Athlete	Matches			Sets			Points		
Athlete	W	L	Tot	W	L	Diff	W	L	Diff
Li Shifeng (CHN)	3	0	3	6	0	+6	126	74	+52
Julien Carraggi (BEL)	1	2	3	3	3	-1	121	119	+2
Tomás Toledano (ESP)	1	2	3	2	4	-2	84	111	-27
Giovanni Toti (ITA)	1	2	3	2	5	-3	107	134	-27

Sunday, 7 October
9:35
Julien Carraggi (BEL)	1–2	Giovanni Toti (ITA)	21–17, 17–21, 12–21	49 min	Court 2
10:45
Li Shifeng (CHN)	2–0	Tomás Toledano (ESP)	21–11, 21–13	33 min	Court 3
Monday, 8 October
10:10
Julien Carraggi (BEL)	2–0	Tomás Toledano (ESP)	21–3, 21–15	26 min	Court 3
11:20
Li Shifeng (CHN)	2–0	Giovanni Toti (ITA)	21–14, 21–7	35 min	Court 1
Tuesday, 9 October
9:35
Giovanni Toti (ITA)	0–2	Tomás Toledano (ESP)	13–21, 14–21	31 min	Court 2
10:10
Li Shifeng (CHN)	2–0	Julien Carraggi (BEL)	21–14, 21–15	39 min	Court 1

==== Group E ====
Athlete	Matches			Sets			Points		
Athlete	W	L	Tot	W	L	Diff	W	L	Diff
Ikhsan Rumbay (INA)	3	0	3	6	0	+6	126	59	+67
Nguyễn Hải Đăng (VIE)	2	1	3	4	2	+2	101	94	+8
Dennis Koppen (NED)	1	2	3	2	4	-2	103	113	-10
Alonso Medel (CHI)	0	3	3	0	6	-6	61	126	-65

Sunday, 7 October
13:30
Ikhsan Rumbay (INA)	2–0	Nguyễn Hải Đăng (VIE)	21–7, 21–9	35 min	Court 1
14:05
Dennis Koppen (NED)	2–0	Alonso Medel (CHI)	21–14, 21–13	23 min	Court 2
Monday, 8 October
13:30
Ikhsan Rumbay (INA)	2–0	Alonso Medel (CHI)	21–7, 21–13	24 min	Court 1
15:50
Dennis Koppen (NED)	0–2	Nguyễn Hải Đăng (VIE)	21–23, 17–21	44 min	Court 3
Tuesday, 9 October
13:30
Alonso Medel (CHI)	0–2	Nguyễn Hải Đăng (VIE)	7–21, 7–21	22 min	Court 2
15:15
Ikhsan Rumbay (INA)	2–0	Dennis Koppen (NED)	21–11, 21–12	34 min	Court 1

==== Group F ====
Athlete	Matches			Sets			Points		
Athlete	W	L	Tot	W	L	Diff	W	L	Diff
Lakshya Sen (IND)	3	0	3	6	0	+6	128	75	+53
Danylo Bosniuk (UKR)	2	1	3	4	2	+2	115	103	+12
Fabrício Farias (BRA)	1	2	3	2	4	-2	100	110	-10
Mohamed Mostafa Kamel (EGY)	0	3	3	0	6	-6	71	126	-55

Sunday, 7 October
13:30
Lakshya Sen (IND)	2–0	Mohamed Mostafa Kamel (EGY)	21–14, 21–10	27 min	Court 3
15:15
Fabrício Farias (BRA)	0–2	Danylo Bosniuk (UKR)	15–21, 21–23	35 min	Court 2
Monday, 8 October
13:30
Lakshya Sen (IND)	2–0	Danylo Bosniuk (UKR)	23–21, 21–8	34 min	Court 3
14:40
Fabrício Farias (BRA)	2–0	Mohamed Mostafa Kamel (EGY)	21–14, 21–10	28 min	Court 1
Tuesday, 9 October
14:05
Danylo Bosniuk (UKR)	2–0	Mohamed Mostafa Kamel (EGY)	21–9, 21–14	23 min	Court 1
15:15
Lakshya Sen (IND)	2–0	Fabricio Farias (BRA)	21–6, 21–16	27 min	Court 3

==== Group G ====
Athlete	Matches			Sets			Points		
Athlete	W	L	Tot	W	L	Diff	W	L	Diff
Chen Shiau-cheng (TPE)	3	0	3	6	0	+6	126	78	+48
Christopher Grimley (GBR)	2	1	3	4	2	+2	112	93	+19
Oscar Guo (NZL)	1	2	3	2	4	-2	94	109	-15
Balázs Pápai (HUN)	0	3	3	0	6	-6	74	126	-52

Sunday, 7 October
14:40
Chen Shiau-cheng (TPE)	2–0	Balázs Pápai (HUN)	21–9, 21–11	29 min	Court 3
15:50
Oscar Guo (NZL)	0–2	Christopher Grimley (GBR)	8–21, 14–21	30 min	Court 1
Monday, 8 October
14:05
Chen Shiau-cheng (TPE)	2–0	Christopher Grimley (GBR)	21–15, 21–13	35 min	Court 2
14:40
Oscar Guo (NZL)	2–0	Balázs Pápai (HUN)	21–16, 21–9	30 min	Court 3
Tuesday, 9 October
14:05
Christopher Grimley (GBR)	2–0	Balázs Pápai (HUN)	21–17, 21–12	31 min	Court 3
15:50
Chen Shiau-cheng (TPE)	2–0	Oscar Guo (NZL)	21–12, 21–18	39 min	Court 2

==== Group H ====
Athlete	Matches			Sets			Points		
Athlete	W	L	Tot	W	L	Diff	W	L	Diff
Kodai Naraoka (JPN)	3	0	3	6	0	+6	126	54	+72
Dmitriy Panarin (KAZ)	2	1	3	4	3	+1	112	96	+16
Cristian Savin (MDA)	1	2	3	3	4	-1	109	102	+7
Chang Ho Kim (FIJ)	0	3	3	0	6	-6	31	126	-95

Sunday, 7 October
14:40
Kodai Naraoka (JPN)	2–0	Chang Ho Kim (FIJ)	21–7, 21–5	18 min	Court 1
15:50
Dmitriy Panarin (KAZ)	2–1	Cristian Savin (MDA)	21–11, 7–21, 21–14	45 min	Court 3
Monday, 8 October
15:15
Dmitriy Panarin (KAZ)	2–0	Chang Ho Kim (FIJ)	21–5, 21–3	16 min	Court 2
15:50
Kodai Naraoka (JPN)	2–0	Cristian Savin (MDA)	21–8, 21–13	29 min	Court 1
Tuesday, 9 October
14:40
Cristian Savin (MDA)	2–0	Chang Ho Kim (FIJ)	21–7, 21–4	16 min	Court 2
15:50
Kodai Naraoka (JPN)	2–0	Dmitriy Panarin (KAZ)	21–9, 21–12	29 min	Court 1

== Knockout stage ==
Quarterfinals; Wednesday, 10 October
1	Kunlavut Vitidsarn (THA)	13	10
7	Arnaud Merklé (FRA)	21	21
3	Nhat Nguyen (IRL)	21	19	19
5	Li Shifeng (CHN)	15	21	21
6	Ikhsan Rumbay (INA)	17	19
4	Lakshya Sen (IND)	21	21
8	Chen Shiau-cheng (TPE)	11	11
2	Kodai Naraoka (JPN)	21	21

Semifinals; Thursday, 11 October
7	Arnaud Merklé (FRA)	7	12
5	Li Shifeng (CHN)	21	21
4	Lakshya Sen (IND)	14	21	24
2	Kodai Naraoka (JPN)	21	15	22

Final; Friday, 12 October
5	Li Shifeng (CHN)	21	21
4	Lakshya Sen (IND)	15	19
Third place
7	Arnaud Merklé (FRA)	17	26	20
2	Kodai Naraoka (JPN)	21	24	22

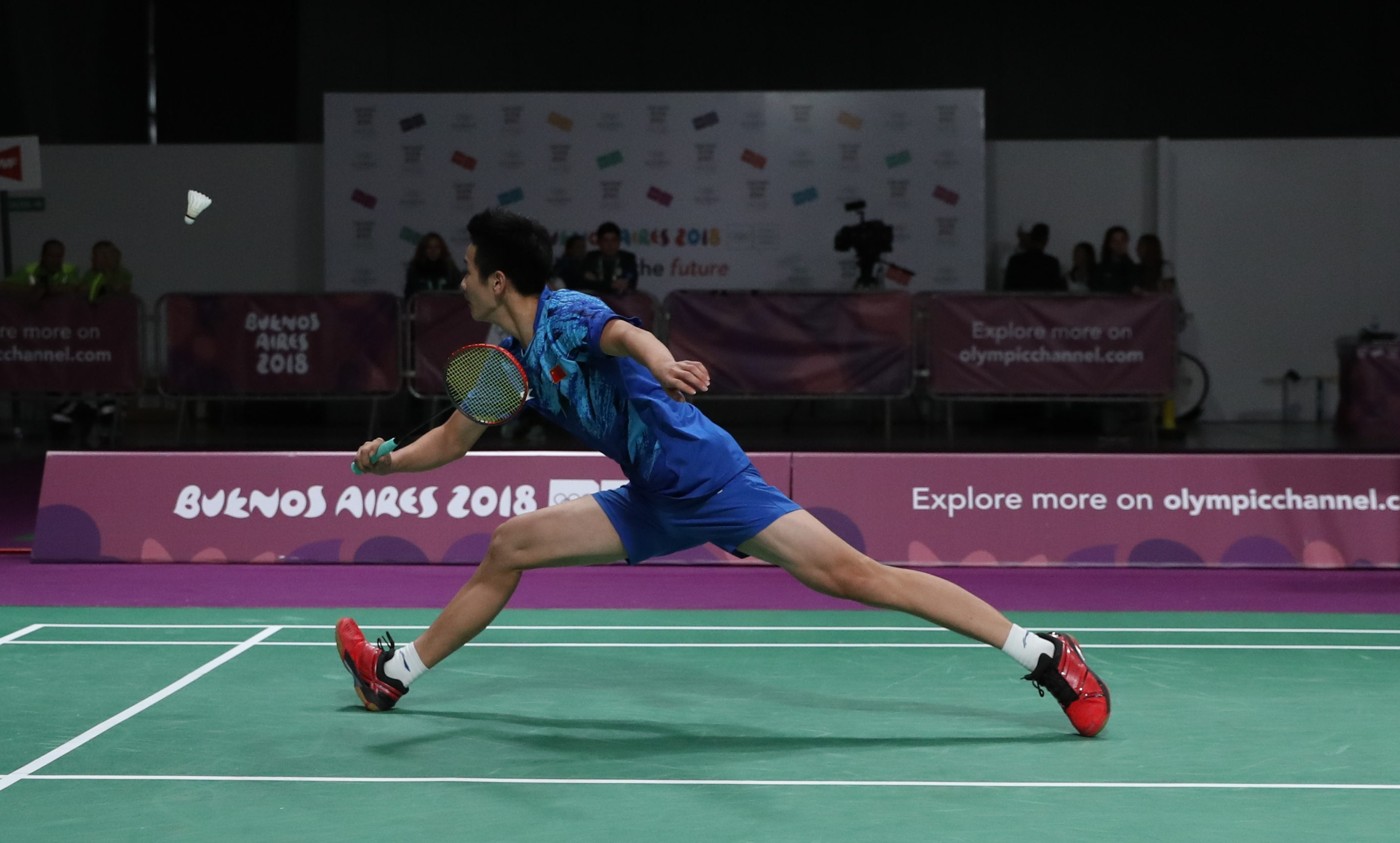
Li Shifeng (Youth Olympic Games Champion) during the Final

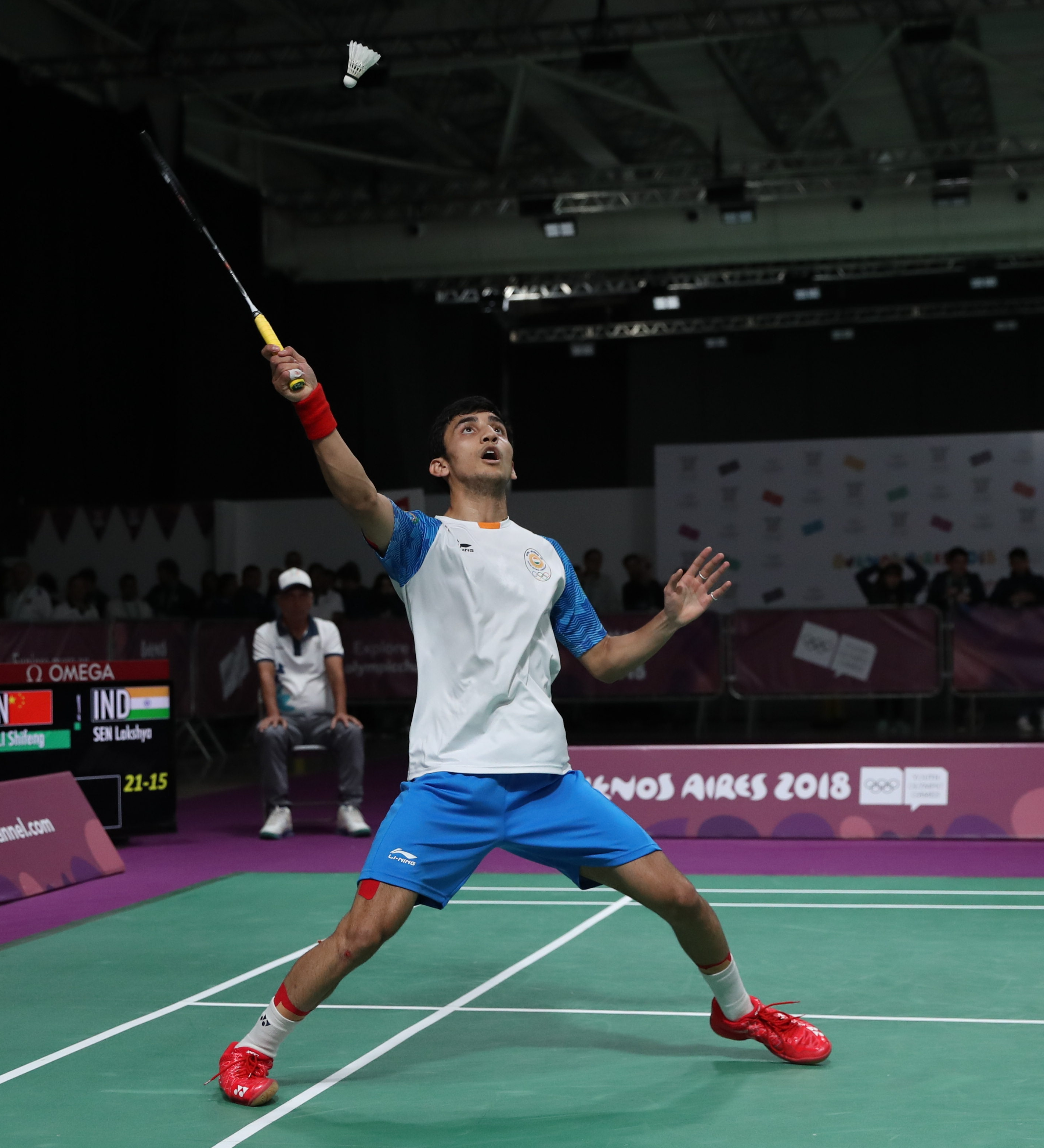
Lakshya Sen during the Final
