= El Salvador at the 2018 Summer Youth Olympics =

- IOC code: ESA
- NOC: El Salvador Olympic Committee
- Website: https://www.olympic.org/el-salvador

in Buenos Aires, Argentina 6 – 18 October 2018
- Competitors: 4 in 2 sports
- Medals: Gold 0 Silver 0 Bronze 0 Total 0

Summer Youth Olympics appearances
- 2010; 2014; 2018

El Salvador participated at the 2018 Summer Youth Olympics in Buenos Aires, Argentina from 6 October to 18 October 2018.

== Badminton ==
El Salvador qualified one player based on the Badminton Junior World Rankings.

Singles

Athlete	Event	Group stage				Quarterfinal	Semifinal	Final / BM	Rank
Athlete	Event	Opposition Score	Opposition Score	Opposition Score	Rank	Opposition Score	Opposition Score	Opposition Score	Rank
Uriel Canjura	Boys' Singles	Delmastro (ARG); W (21–6, 21–13)	Keoxay (LAO); W (21–9, 21–15)	Nguyen (IRL); L (4–21, 11–21)	2	did not advance			9

Team

Athlete	Event	Group stage				Quarterfinal	Semifinal	Final / BM	Rank
Athlete	Event	Opposition Score	Opposition Score	Opposition Score	Rank	Opposition Score	Opposition Score	Opposition Score	Rank
Team Gamma; Uriel Canjura (ESA); Joel Koh (SGP); Li Shifeng (CHN); Alonso Medel (CHI); Halla Bouksani (ALG); Fernanda Saponara Rivva (PER); Jakka Vaishnavi Reddy (IND)	Mixed Teams	Omega (MIX); L (99–110)	Sigma (MIX); L (86–110)	Theta (MIX); W (110–107)	3Q	Alpha (MIX); L (94–110)	did not advance		5
