= Nepal at the 2018 Summer Youth Olympics =

- IOC code: NEP
- NOC: Nepal Olympic Committee
- Website: http://www.nocnepal.org.np/

in Buenos Aires, Argentina 6 – 18 October 2018
- Competitors: 3 in 3 sports
- Medals: Gold 0 Silver 0 Bronze 0 Total 0

Summer Youth Olympics appearances
- 2010; 2014; 2018

Nepal participated in the 2018 Summer Youth Olympics in Buenos Aires, Argentina from 6 to 18 October 2018.

== Badminton ==
Nepal was given a quota to compete by the tripartite committee.

Singles

| Athlete | Event | Group stage | | | | Quarterfinal | Semifinal | Final / BM | Rank |
| Athlete | Event | Opposition Score | Opposition Score | Opposition Score | Rank | Opposition Score | Opposition Score | Opposition Score | Rank |
|---|---|---|---|---|---|---|---|---|---|
| Rukesh Maharjan | Boys' Singles | Koh (SGP); L (21–7, 21–9) | Vitidsarn (THA) no match | Vath (CAM) no match | WDN | did not advance | | | 9 |

Team

| Athlete | Event | Group stage | | | | Quarterfinal | Semifinal | Final / BM | Rank |
| Athlete | Event | Opposition Score | Opposition Score | Opposition Score | Rank | Opposition Score | Opposition Score | Opposition Score | Rank |
|---|---|---|---|---|---|---|---|---|---|
| Team Sigma; Rukesh Maharjan (NEP); Dennis Koppen (NED); Ikhsan Rumbay (INA); Cristian Savin (MDA); Madeleine Caren Akoumba Ze (CMR); Grace King (GBR); Ann-Kathrin Spöri (GER); Wang Zhiyi (CHN) | Mixed Teams | Theta (MIX); W (110–100) | Gamma (MIX); W (110–86) | Omega (MIX); L (98–110) | 2Q | Zeta (MIX); L (106–110) | did not advance | | 5 |

== Judo ==
Individual

| Athlete | Event | Round of 16 | Quarterfinals | Semifinals | Rep 1 | Rep 2 | Rep 2 | Final / BM | Rank |
| Athlete | Event | Opposition Result | Opposition Result | Opposition Result | Opposition Result | Opposition Result | Opposition Result | Opposition Result | Rank |
|---|---|---|---|---|---|---|---|---|---|
| Soniya Bhatta | Girls' 44 kg | Ana Viktorija Puljiz (CRO); L 00s3-10 | did not advance | | Aleksa Georgieva (BUL); L 00–10 | did not advance | | | |

Team

| Athletes | Event | Round of 16 | Quarterfinals | Semifinals | Final | Rank |
| Athletes | Event | Opposition Result | Opposition Result | Opposition Result | Opposition Result | Rank |
|---|---|---|---|---|---|---|
| Team Los Angeles; Soniya Bhatta (NEP); Ariel Shulman (ISR); Nahomys Acosta Batte (CUB); Turpal Djoukaev (FIN); Saskia Brothers (AUS); Georgios Balarjishvili (CYP); Raffaela Igl (GER); Alin Bagrin (MDA) | Mixed team | Team Seoul (MIX); W 5–3 | Team Athens (MIX); L 3–5 | did not advance | | 5 |

== Weightlifting ==
Nepal was given a quota by the tripartite committee to compete in weightlifting.

- ~~Boys' events - 1 quota~~ (not used)
