= Boxing at the 2018 Summer Youth Olympics – Boys' heavyweight =

Boxing competitions

Boys' heavyweight boxing at the III Summer Youth Olympic Games
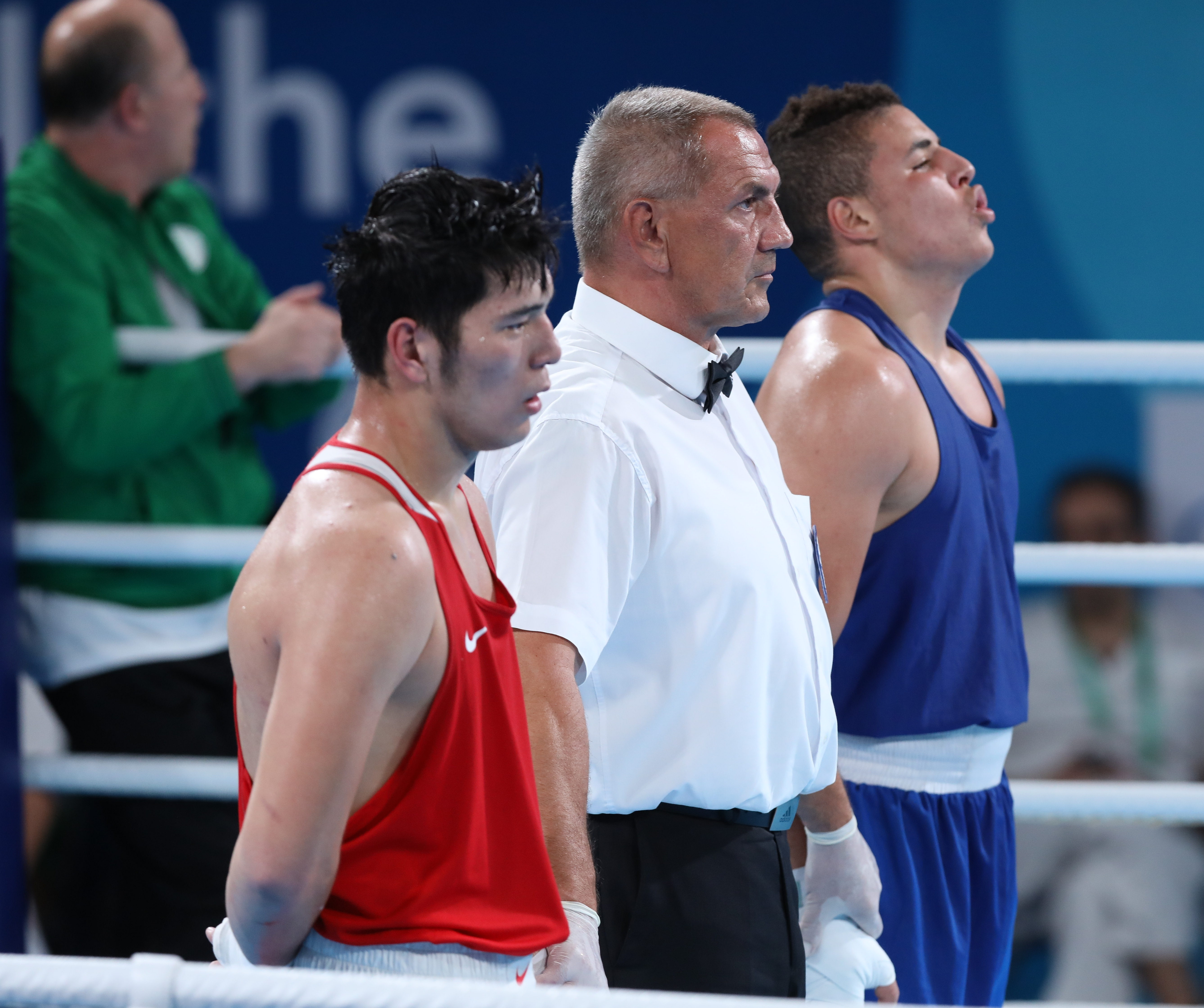
- presentation of the gold medallist, Aibek Oralbay (red)
- Venue: Oceania Pavilion
- Date: 14–17 October
- Competitors: 6 from 6 nations

Medalists
1st place, gold medalist(s)		Aibek Oralbay	Kazakhstan
2nd place, silver medalist(s)		Mohamed-Amine Hacid	Algeria
3rd place, bronze medalist(s)		Alvin Canales	Puerto Rico

The boys' heavyweight boxing competition at the 2018 Summer Youth Olympics in Buenos Aires was held from 14 to 17 October at the Oceania Pavilion.

== Schedule ==
All times are local (UTC−3).

Date	Time	Round
Sunday, 14 October	19:35	Preliminary Round 1
Monday, 15 October	19:03	Preliminary Round 2
Tuesday, 16 October	19:32	Semifinals
Wednesday, 17 October	20:00	Finals

== Results ==
Preliminary Round 1
Alvin Canales (PUR)	5
Andrews Salgado (CHI)	0
Malcolm Matthes (SAM)	0
Daniel Mikušťák (CZE)	5

Preliminary Round 2
Aibek Oralbay (KAZ)	5
Andrews Salgado (CHI)	0
Malcolm Matthes (SAM)	0
Mohamed-Amine Hacid (ALG)	5

Semifinals
Alvin Canales (PUR)	0
Aibek Oralbay (KAZ)	5
Mohamed-Amine Hacid (ALG)	3
Daniel Mikušťák (CZE)	2
Fifth place
Andrews Salgado (CHI)	4
Malcolm Matthes (SAM)	1

Final
Aibek Oralbay (KAZ)	5
Mohamed-Amine Hacid (ALG)	0
Third place
Alvin Canales (PUR)	5
Daniel Mikušťák (CZE)	0

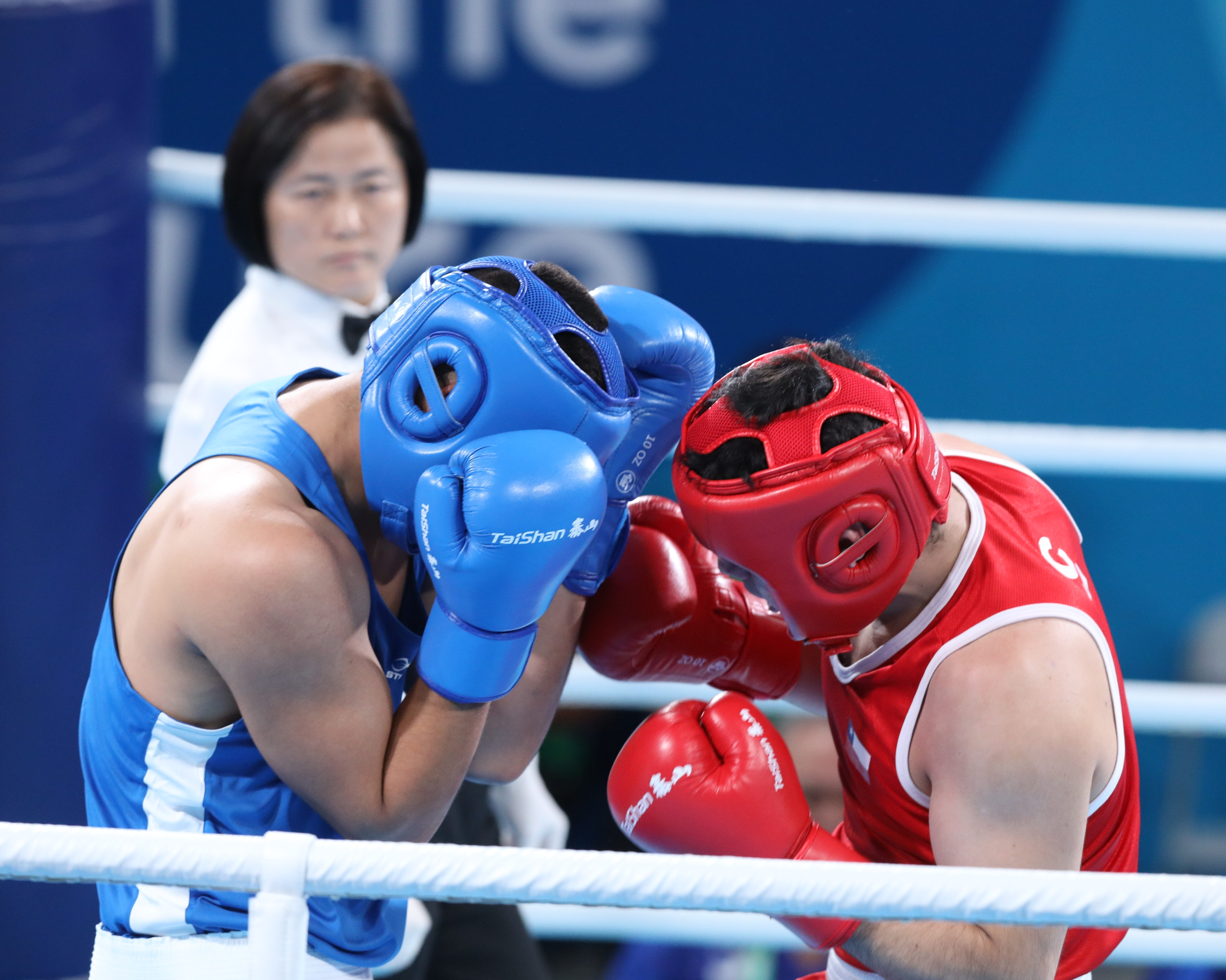
5th place match: Andrews Salgado vs. Malcolm Matthes

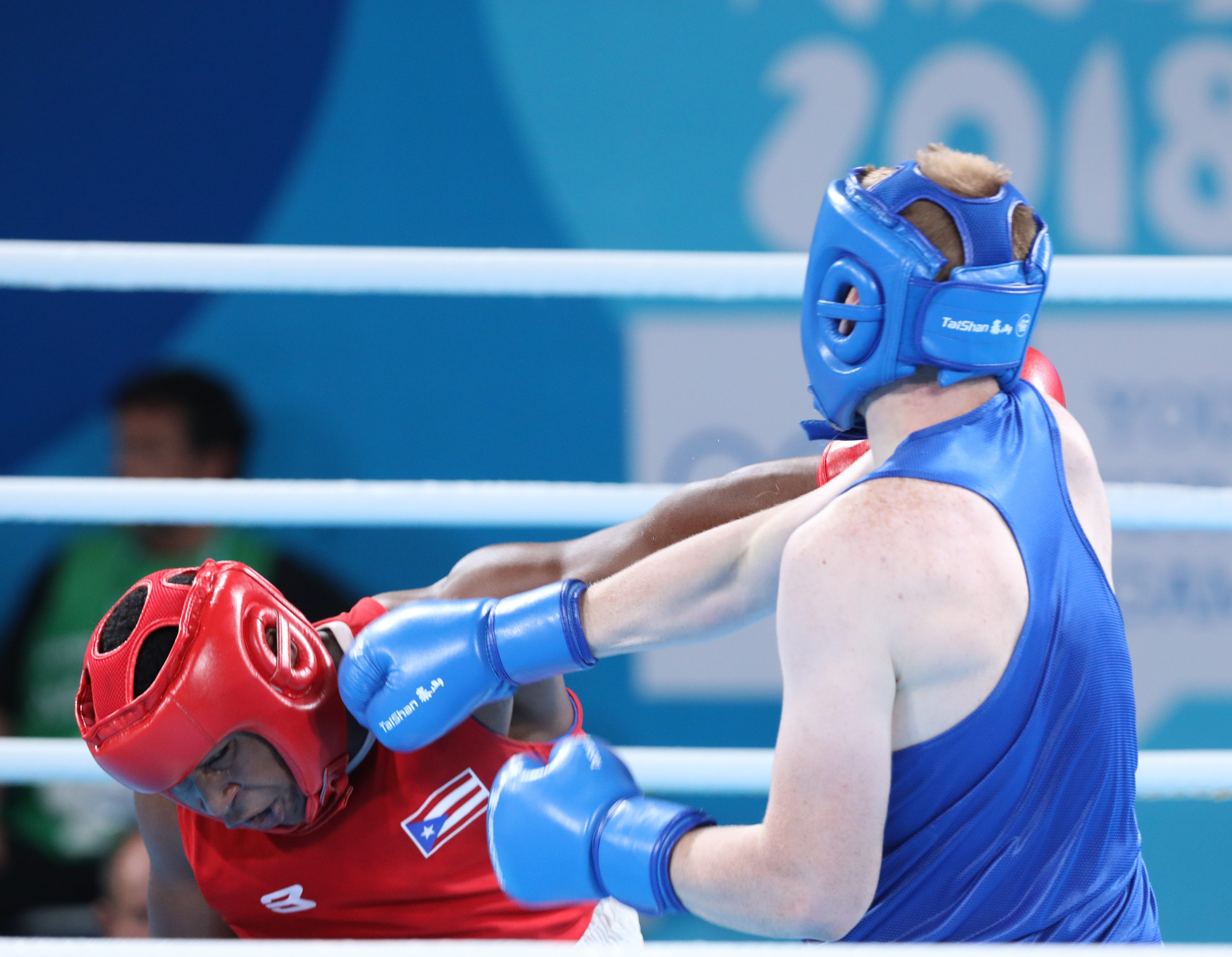
Bronze medal match: Alvin Canales vs. Daniel Mikušťák

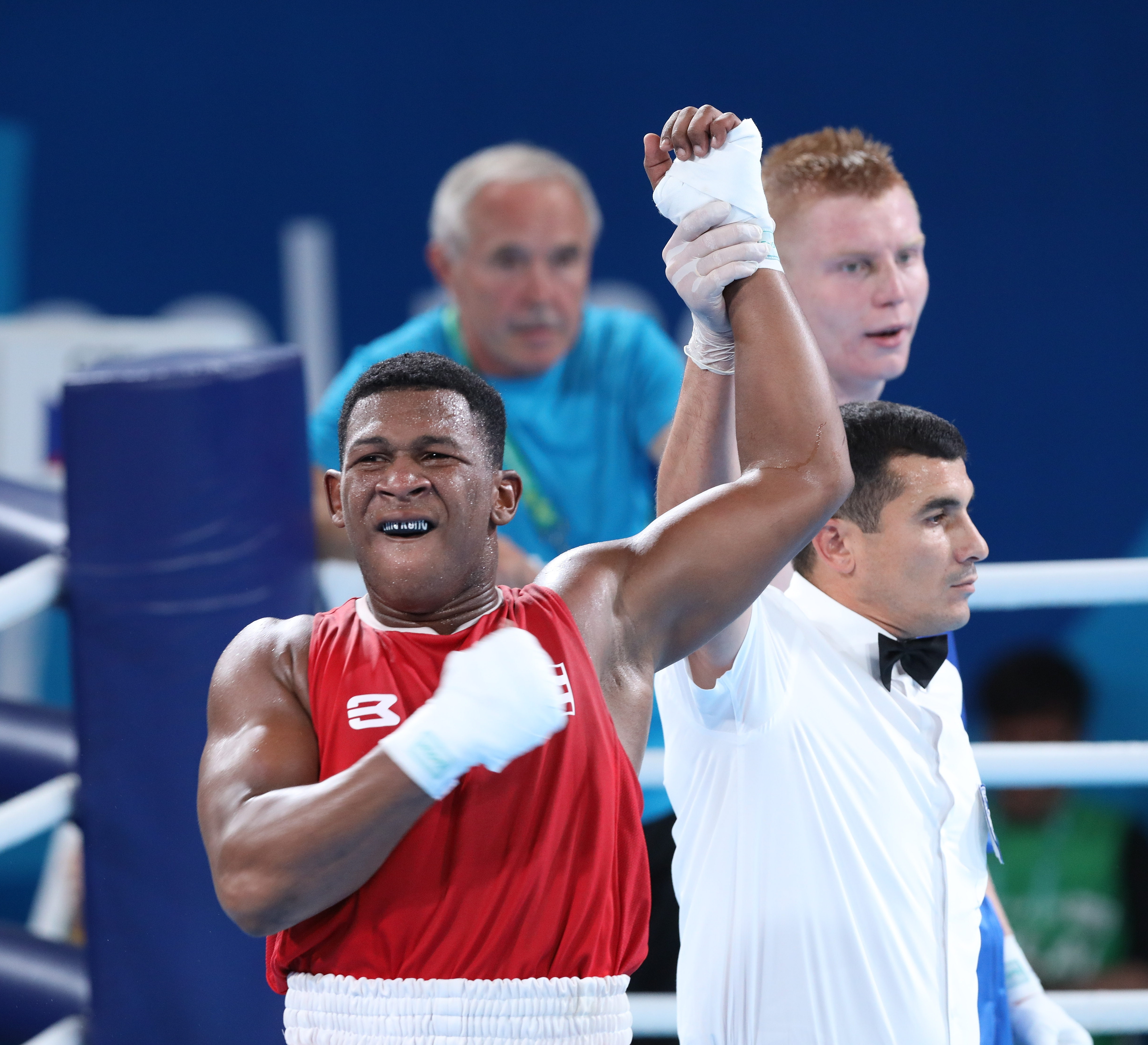
Alvin Canales celebrates his bronze medal

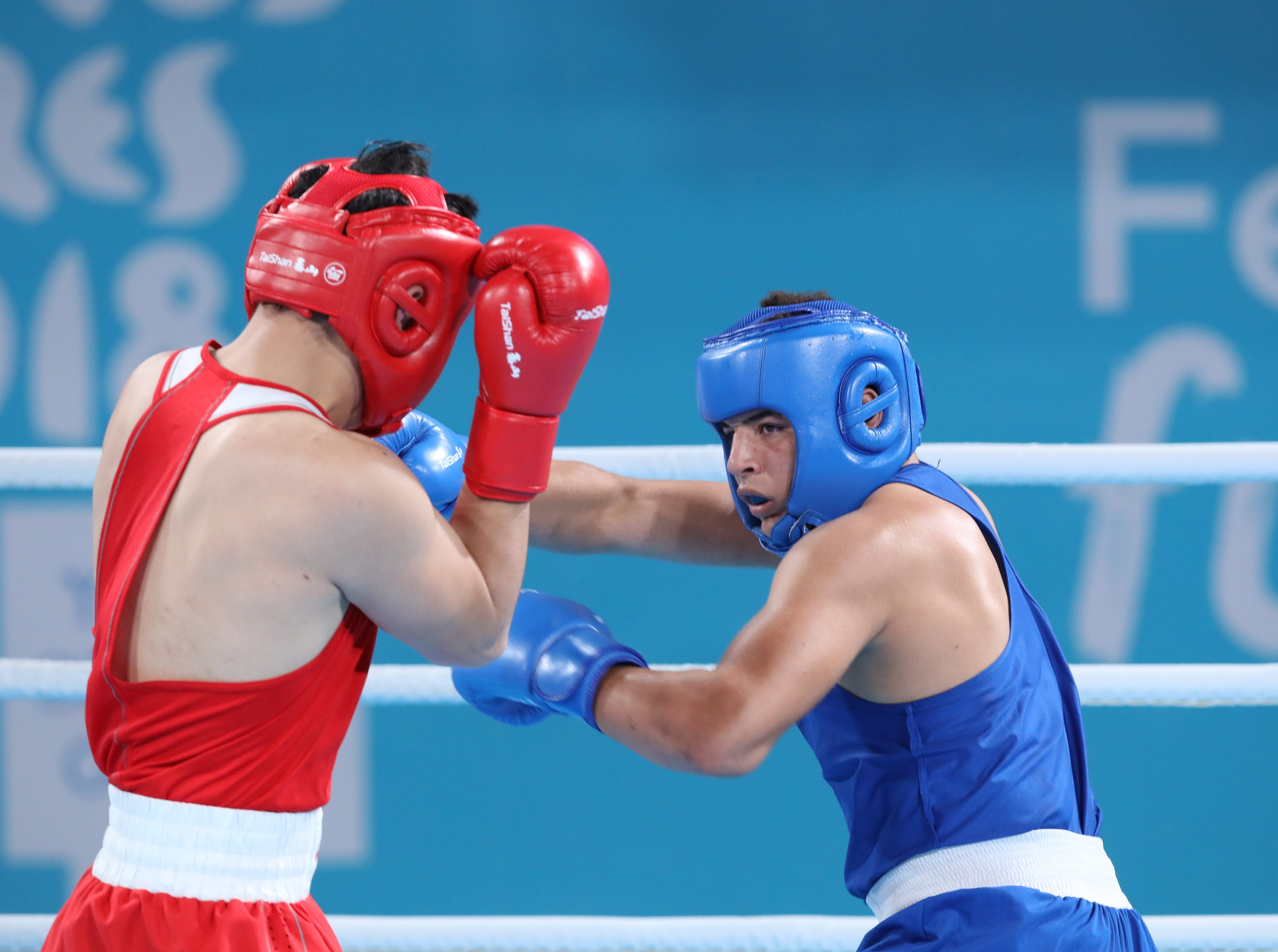
Gold medal match: Aibek Oralbay vs. Mohamed-Amine Hacid

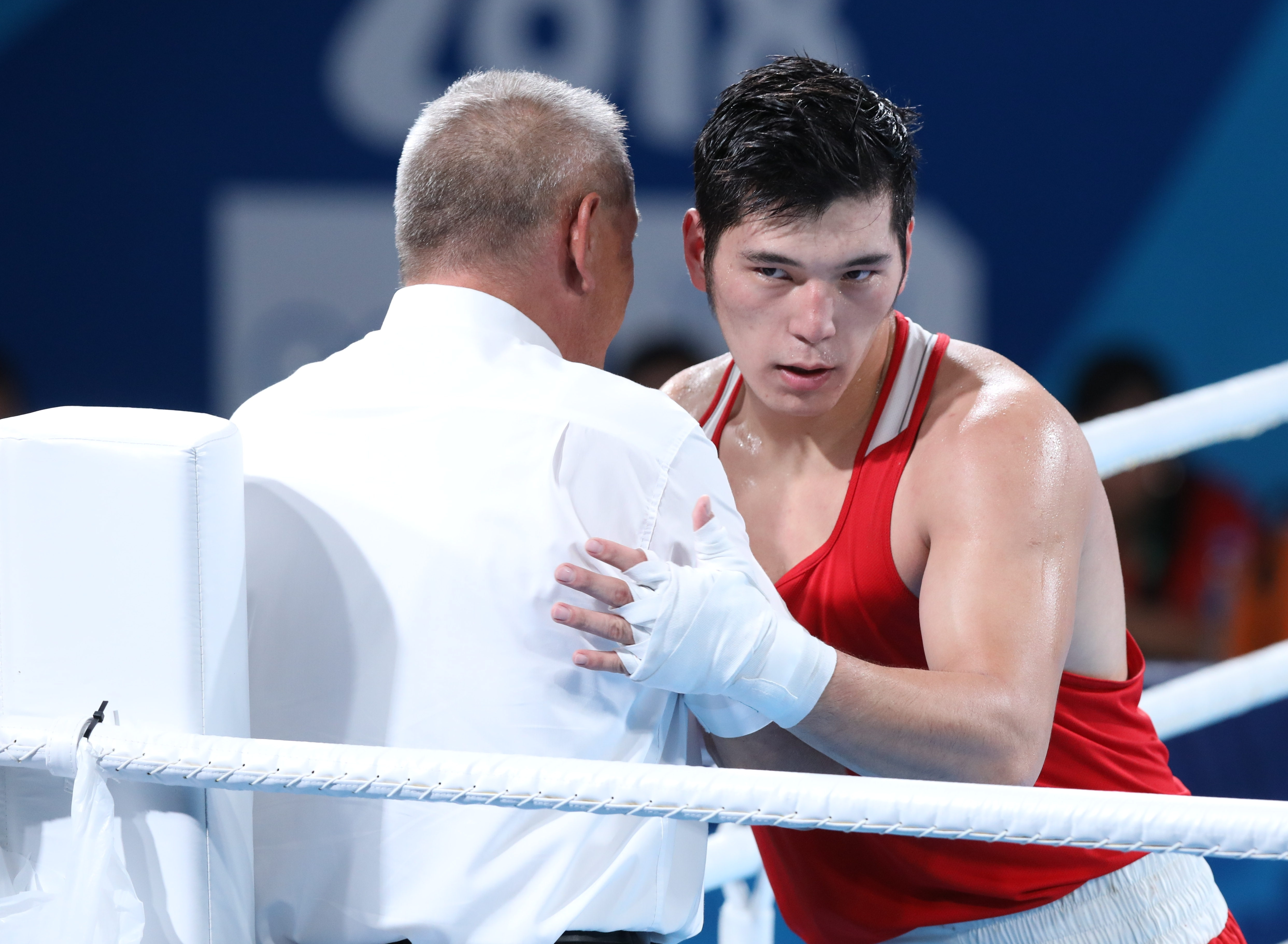
Aibek Oralbay receives gratulations from the referee

== Final standings ==
Rank	Athlete
1st place, gold medalist(s)	Aibek Oralbay (KAZ)
2nd place, silver medalist(s)	Mohamed-Amine Hacid (ALG)
3rd place, bronze medalist(s)	Alvin Canales (PUR)
4	Daniel Mikušťák (CZE)
5	Andrews Salgado (CHI)
6	Malcolm Matthes (SAM)
