= Singapore at the 2018 Summer Youth Olympics =

- IOC code: SGP
- NOC: Singapore National Olympic Council
- Website: http://www.singaporeolympics.com/

in Buenos Aires, Argentina 6 – 18 October 2018
- Competitors: 18 in 10 sports
- Flag bearer: Pang Yew En Koen
- Medals: Gold 0 Silver 0 Bronze 0 Total 0

Summer Youth Olympics appearances
- 2010; 2014; 2018

Singapore participated at the 2018 Summer Youth Olympics in Buenos Aires, Argentina from 6 October to 18 October 2018.

== Athletics ==
Singapore qualified one athlete based on the Youth Olympic Games Asia Area Qualifiers.

- Boys' High Jump - Kampton KAM

Individual

| Athlete | Event | Round 1 | Round 2 | Total Height | Rank |
|---|---|---|---|---|---|
| Kampton Kam | Boys | 2.05m | 2.07m | 4.12m | 7th |

== Badminton ==
Singapore qualified two players based on the Badminton Junior World Rankings.

Singles

| Athlete | Event | Group stage | | | | Quarterfinal | Semifinal | Final / BM | Rank |
| Athlete | Event | Opposition Score | Opposition Score | Opposition Score | Rank | Opposition Score | Opposition Score | Opposition Score | Rank |
|---|---|---|---|---|---|---|---|---|---|
| Joel Koh | Boys' Singles | Maharjan (NEP); W (21–7, 21–9) | Vath (CAM); W (21–3, 21–6) | Vitidsarn (THA); L (14–21, 18–21) | 2 | did not advance | | | 9 |
| Jaslyn Hooi | Girls' Singles | Švábíková (CZE); W (21–10, 21–14) | King (GBR); L (17–21, 21–6, 22–24) | İnci (TUR); W (21–16, 21–12) | 1Q | Gai (USA); W (21–16, 21–18) | Wang (CHN); L (11–21, 10–21) | Chaiwan (THA); L (9–21, 13–21) | 4 |

Team

| Athlete | Event | Group stage | | | | Quarterfinal | Semifinal | Final / BM | Rank |
| Athlete | Event | Opposition Score | Opposition Score | Opposition Score | Rank | Opposition Score | Opposition Score | Opposition Score | Rank |
|---|---|---|---|---|---|---|---|---|---|
| Team Gamma; Joel Koh (SGP); Uriel Canjura (ESA); Li Shifeng (CHN); Alonso Medel (CHI); Halla Bouksani (ALG); Fernanda Saponara Rivva (PER); Jakka Vaishnavi Reddy (IND) | Mixed Teams | Omega (MIX); L (99–110) | Sigma (MIX); L (86–110) | Theta (MIX); W (110–107) | 3Q | Alpha (MIX); L (94–110) | did not advance | | 5 |
| Team Zeta; Jaslyn Hooi (SGP); Danylo Bosniuk (UKR); Christopher Grimley (GBR); Kettiya Keoxay (LAO); Nhat Nguyen (IRL); Maharani Sekar Batari (INA); Nairoby Abigail Jiménez (DOM); Vivien Sándorházi (HUN) | Mixed Teams | Delta (MIX); L (95–110) | Epsilon (MIX); W (110–89) | Alpha (MIX); L (103–110) | 3Q | Sigma (MIX); W (110–106) | Omega (MIX); L (109–110) | Theta (MIX); L (107–110) | 4 |

== Gymnastics ==
=== Artistic ===
Singapore qualified one gymnast based on its performance at the 2018 Asian Junior Championship.

- Girls' artistic individual all-around - 1 quota

| Athlete | Event | Apparatus | | | | Total | Rank |
| Athlete | Event | V | UB | BB | F | Total | Rank |
|---|---|---|---|---|---|---|---|
| Tamara Anika Ong | Qualification | 11.866 | 10.500 | 10.733 | 11.466 | 44.565 | 27 |

=== Multidiscipline ===
| Team | Athlete | Acrobatic | Artistic | Rhythmic | Trampoline | Total points | Rank |
|---|---|---|---|---|---|---|---|
| Team Simone Biles (Orange) | Mariela Kostadinova (BUL); Panayot Dimitrov (BUL) | 10 | — | | | 293 | 1st place, gold medalist(s) |
| Team Simone Biles (Orange) | Ruan Lange (RSA) | — | 17 | — | | 293 | 1st place, gold medalist(s) |
| Team Simone Biles (Orange) | Krisztián Balázs (HUN) | — | 34 | — | | 293 | 1st place, gold medalist(s) |
| Team Simone Biles (Orange) | Nazar Chepurnyi (UKR) | — | 70 | — | | 293 | 1st place, gold medalist(s) |
| Team Simone Biles (Orange) | Tamara Ong (SGP) | — | 38 | — | | 293 | 1st place, gold medalist(s) |
| Team Simone Biles (Orange) | Phạm Như Phương (VIE) | — | 48 | — | | 293 | 1st place, gold medalist(s) |
| Team Simone Biles (Orange) | Alba Petisco (ESP) | — | 40 | — | | 293 | 1st place, gold medalist(s) |
| Team Simone Biles (Orange) | Talisa Torretti (ITA) | — | | 13 | — | 293 | 1st place, gold medalist(s) |
| Team Simone Biles (Orange) | Daria Trubnikova (RUS) | — | | 4 | — | 293 | 1st place, gold medalist(s) |
| Team Simone Biles (Orange) | Yelyzaveta Luzan (AZE) | — | | – | — | 293 | 1st place, gold medalist(s) |
| Team Simone Biles (Orange) | Liam Christie (AUS) | — | | | 17 | 293 | 1st place, gold medalist(s) |
| Team Simone Biles (Orange) | Fan Xiny (CHN) | — | | | 2 | 293 | 1st place, gold medalist(s) |

== Sailing ==
Singapore qualified one boat based on its performance at the Asian Nacra 15 Qualifiers. Later, at the 2018 Singapore Open (Asian Techno 293+ Qualifiers) Singapore qualified two boats.

- Boys' Techno 293+ - 1 boat
- Girls' Techno 293+ - 1 boat
- Mixed Nacra 15 - 1 boat

== Shooting ==
Singapore qualified one sport shooter based on its performance at the 2017 Asian Championships.

- Girls' 10m Air Pistol - Amanda MAK

Individual

| Athlete | Event | Qualification | | Final | |
| Athlete | Event | Points | Rank | Points | Rank |
|---|---|---|---|---|---|
| Mak Amanda Sao Keng | Girls' 10m air pistol | 549-10 | 16 | did not advance | |

Team

| Athletes | Event | Qualification | | Round of 16 | Quarterfinals | Semifinals | Final / BM | |
| Athletes | Event | Points | Rank | Opposition Result | Opposition Result | Opposition Result | Opposition Result | Rank |
|---|---|---|---|---|---|---|---|---|
| Mak Amanda Sao Keng (SGP); Erfan Salavati (IRI) | Mixed 10 metre air pistol | 755-16 | 1 | Ibarra Miranda (MEX); Honta (UKR); L 5-10 | did not advance | | | |

== Swimming ==
Boys

| Athlete | Event | Heat | | Semifinal | | Final | |
| Athlete | Event | Time | Rank | Time | Rank | Time | Rank |
|---|---|---|---|---|---|---|---|
| Maximillian Ang Wei | 50 m breaststroke | 30.09 | 27 | did not advance | | | |
| Maximillian Ang Wei | 100 m breaststroke | 1:04.24 | 19 | did not advance | | | |
| Maximillian Ang Wei | 200 m breaststroke | 2:16.09 | 6 | — | | 2:18.85 | 7 |
| Maximillian Ang Wei | 200 m individual medley | 2:05.96 | 12 | — | | did not advance | |
| Ong Jung Yi | 50 m butterfly | 25.67 | 37 | did not advance | | | |
| Ong Jung Yi | 100 m butterfly | 54.21 | 15 | 54.70 | 16 | did not advance | |
| Ong Jung Yi | 200 m butterfly | 2:02.99 | 14 | — | | did not advance | |

Girls

| Athlete | Event | Heat | | Semifinal | | Final | |
| Athlete | Event | Time | Rank | Time | Rank | Time | Rank |
|---|---|---|---|---|---|---|---|
| Christie May Chue Mun Ee | 50 m freestyle | 26.83 | 22 | did not advance | | | |
| Christie May Chue Mun Ee | 100 m freestyle | 56.92 | 16 | 57.29 | 15 | did not advance | |
| Christie May Chue Mun Ee | 200 m freestyle | 2:02.72 | 13 | — | | did not advance | |
| Christie May Chue Mun Ee | 50 m breaststroke | 31.95 | 7 | 32.86 | 13 | did not advance | |
| Christie May Chue Mun Ee | 100 m breaststroke | 1.11.56 | 19 | did not advance | | | |
| Christie May Chue Mun Ee | 200 m breaststroke | 2:36.49 | 24 | — | | did not advance | |
| Gan Ching Hwee | 400 m freestyle | 4:17.86 | 10 | — | | did not advance | |
| Gan Ching Hwee | 800 m freestyle | — | | | | 8:44.69 | 6 |

Mixed

| Athlete | Event | Heat | | Final | |
| Athlete | Event | Time | Rank | Time | Rank |
|---|---|---|---|---|---|
| Ong Jung Yi; Maximillian Ang Wei; Gan Ching Hwee; Christie May Chue Mun Ee | 4 × 100 m freestyle relay | 3:41.47 | 12 | did not advance | |
| Gan Ching Hwee; Maximillian Ang Wei; Ong Jung Yi; Christie May Chue Mun Ee | 4 × 100 m medley relay | 4:05.67 | 21 | did not advance | |

== Table tennis ==
Singapore qualified one table tennis player based on its performance at the Road to Buenos Aires (Latin America) series. Singapore later qualified a male table tennis player based on its performance at the Road to Buenos Aires (Oceania) series.

- Boys' singles - Pang Yew En Koen
- Girls' singles - Goi Rui Xuan

== Triathlon ==
Singapore qualified one athlete based on its performance at the 2018 Asian Youth Olympic Games Qualifier.

Individual

| Athlete | Event | Swim (750m) | Trans 1 | Bike (20 km) | Trans 2 | Run (5 km) | Total Time | Rank |
|---|---|---|---|---|---|---|---|---|
| Emma Ada Middleditch | Girls | 10:54 | 0:48 | 30:57 | 0:28 | 17:57 | 1:01:04 | 11 |

Relay

| Athlete | Event | Total Times per Athlete (Swim 250m, Bike 6.6 km, Run 1.8 km) | Total Group Time | Rank |
|---|---|---|---|---|
| Asia 1 Lee Jung-won (KOR); Teppei Tokuyama (JPN); Emma Ada Middleditch (SGP); Daniil Zubtsov (KAZ) | Mixed Relay | 22:57 (8); 21:44 (9); 24:01 (7); 23:15 (10) | 1:31:57 | 10 |
