= Laos at the 2018 Summer Youth Olympics =

- IOC code: LAO
- NOC: National Olympic Committee of Lao

in Buenos Aires, Argentina 6 – 18 October 2018
- Competitors: 4 in 3 sports
- Medals: Gold 0 Silver 0 Bronze 0 Total 0

Summer Youth Olympics appearances
- 2010; 2014; 2018

Laos participated at the 2018 Summer Youth Olympics in Buenos Aires, Argentina from 6 October to 18 October 2018.

== Badminton ==
Laos was given a quota to compete by the tripartite committee.

- Boys' singles – 1 quota

Singles

Athlete	Event	Group stage				Quarterfinal	Semifinal	Final / BM	Rank
Athlete	Event	Opposition Score	Opposition Score	Opposition Score	Rank	Opposition Score	Opposition Score	Opposition Score	Rank
Kettiya Keoxay	Boys' Singles	Nguyen (IRL); L (11–21, 6–21)	Canjura (ESA); L (9–21, 15–21)	Delmastro (ARG); W (19–21, 21–10, 21–19)	3	did not advance			9

Team

Athlete	Event	Group stage				Quarterfinal	Semifinal	Final / BM	Rank
Athlete	Event	Opposition Score	Opposition Score	Opposition Score	Rank	Opposition Score	Opposition Score	Opposition Score	Rank
Team Zeta; Kettiya Keoxay (LAO); Danylo Bosniuk (UKR); Christopher Grimley (GBR); Nhat Nguyen (IRL); Maharani Sekar Batari (INA); Jaslyn Hooi (SGP); Nairoby Abigail Jiménez (DOM); Vivien Sándorházi (HUN)	Mixed Teams	Delta (MIX); L (95–110)	Epsilon (MIX); W (110–89)	Alpha (MIX); L (103–110)	3Q	Sigma (MIX); W (110–106)	Omega (MIX); L (109–110)	Theta (MIX); L (107–110)	4
