= Republic of the Congo at the 2018 Summer Youth Olympics =

- IOC code: CGO
- NOC: Comité National Olympique et Sportif Congolais

in Buenos Aires
- Competitors: 2 in 2 sports
- Medals: Gold 0 Silver 0 Bronze 0 Total 0

Summer Youth Olympics appearances
- 2010; 2014; 2018

The Republic of the Congo competed at the 2018 Summer Youth Olympics in Buenos Aires, Argentina from 6 October to 18 October 2018.

== Competitors ==
Sport	Boys	Girls	Total
Athletics	0	1	1
Swimming	1	0	1

== Athletics ==
Congo qualified one athlete to compete in the games.

Girls

Athlete	Event	Stage 1		Stage 2		Total	
Athlete	Event	Result	Rank	Result	Rank	Total	Rank
Evedieu Samba	400 m hurdles	1:10.63	7	1:08.15	3	2:18.78	16

== Swimming ==
Congo qualified one male swimmer for the games.

Boys

Athlete	Event	Heat		Semifinal		Final	
Athlete	Event	Time	Rank	Time	Rank	Time	Rank
Eddie Corneille Boyengue	50 m freestyle	37.28	6	did not advance			
Eddie Corneille Boyengue	50 m breaststroke	DNS		did not advance			
