= Loubna Benhadja =

Algerian hurdler (born 2001)

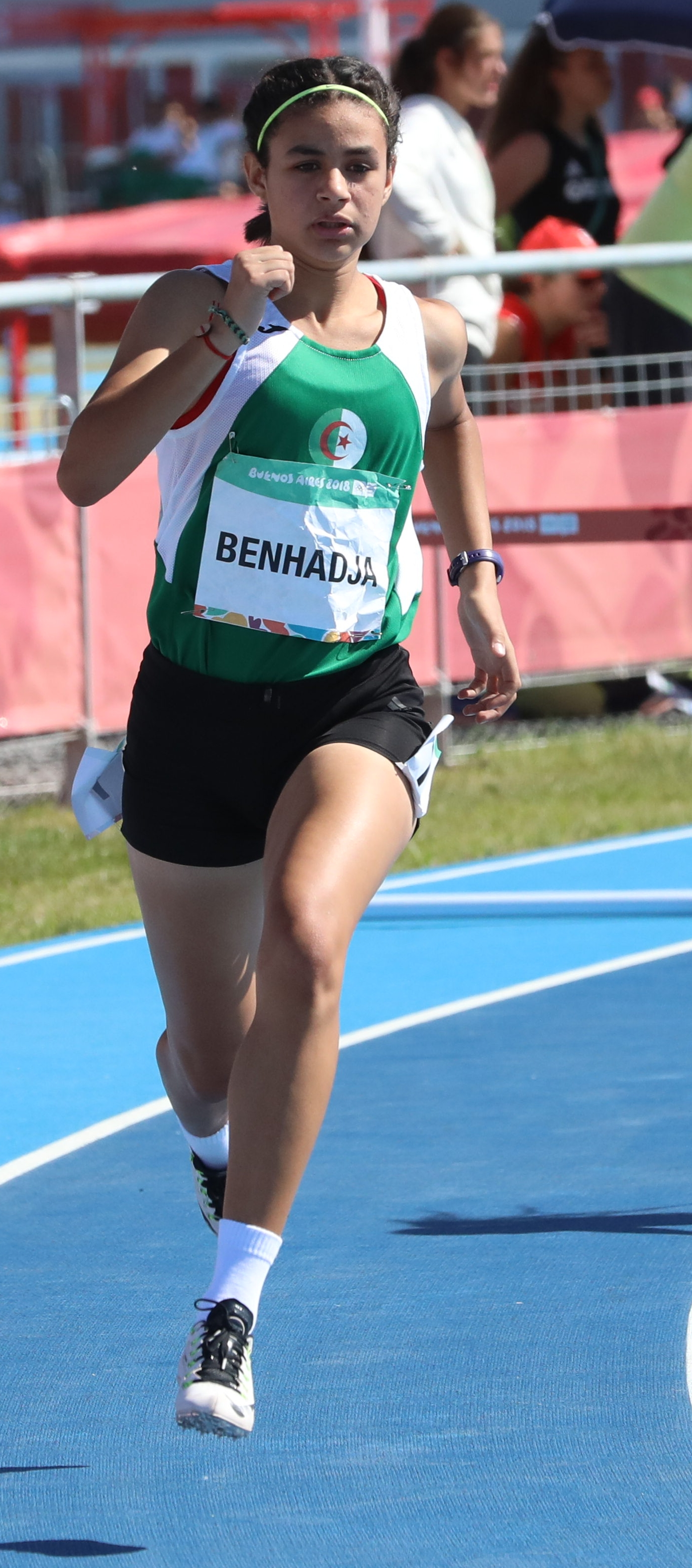
- Benhadja on 400 m hurdle in 2018

Personal information
- Born: 11 February 2001 (age 25) Blida, Algeria

Sport
- Sport: Athletics
- Event: 400 metres hurdles

Loubna Benhadja (born 11 February 2001) is an Algerian athlete. She competed in the women's 400 metres hurdles event at the 2020 Summer Olympics.

Benhadja joined the UTEP Miners track and field team, qualifying for the 2025 NCAA Division I Outdoor Track and Field Championships in the flat 400 m.
