= Dean Clancy =

Irish boxer (born 2001)

Dean Clancy OLY
Personal information
- Full name: Dean Patrick Clancy
- Born: 20 October 2001 (age 25) Sligo, Ireland
- Height: 178 cm (5 ft 10 in)

Sport
- Sport: Boxing
- Weight class: Light welterweight, Lightweight, Featherweight
- Club: Sean McDermott Boxing Club
Medal record
Men's amateur boxing
Representing Ireland
European Games
Bronze medal – third place	2023 Kraków Poland	Light welterweight
European U22 Boxing Championships
Gold medal – first place	2021 Roseto degli Abruzzi Italy	Light welterweight
European Youth Boxing Championships
Silver medal – second place	2018 Italy	52 kg
European Junior Boxing Championships
Silver medal – second place	2017 Bulgaria	52 kg

Dean Patrick Clancy OLY (born 20 October 2001) is an Irish amateur boxer who won a gold medal at light welterweight at the 2021 European Under-22 Championships and bronze at the 2023 European Games. He competed at the 2024 Summer Olympics.

== Biography ==
Having started boxing aged eight, Clancy had his first exhibition bout at nine-years-old during which he stopped his opponent in round two.

He was 13 when he won his first Irish schoolboys’ title with his maiden international honours coming at the 2017 European Junior Championship where he took a silver medal.

It was silver again at the 2018 European Youth Championships before a fourth-place finish at the 2018 Summer Youth Olympics in Buenos Aires, Argentina, where he lost a box-off for the bronze medal against England's Hopey Price.

Only weeks after his 18th birthday, Clancy won his first Irish national elite title, defeating Patryk Adamus via split decision in the featherweight final in November 2019.

After winning four fights in six days to reach the final at the 2021 European Under-22 Championships in Roseto degli Abruzzi, Italy, including beating number 3 seed Nenad Javanovic of Serbia, Clancy won gold when his opponent for the decider, Ahmad Shtiwi from Israel, failed to show-up due to injury therefore handing him the victory by walkover.

Moving into senior international competition, he won a bronze medal in the light welterweight division at the 2023 European Games in Poland, losing to French world champion Sofiane Oumiha in the semi-finals. The result was enough to secure him qualification for the 2024 Summer Olympics in Paris.

Clancy lost in the quarter-finals to Malik Hasanov from Azerbaijan at the 2024 European Amateur Boxing Championships.

Clancy's Olympic place was officially confirmed when Ireland named their boxing team on 28 June 2024. He was drawn to fight Obada Al-Kasbeh from Jordan in the first round on the opening day of the boxing tournament, losing by 3–2 split decision despite his opponent being given a point deduction.

He was selected to represent Ireland in the 65 kg category at the World Boxing Championships in Liverpool, England, in September 2025. After receiving a bye in the first round, Clancy defeated Ihlasbek Kochkarov from Turkmenistan by unanimous decision in his opening bout. But his competition ended in the round-of-16 with a unanimous decision defeat to Georgia's 2024 Olympic bronze medalist, Lasha Guruli.

At the 2026 European Championships in Sofia, Bulgaria, Clancy competed for Ireland in the 65 kg division and defeated Germany's Mohamed Siala 3:2 in his opening bout, before losing in the second round to eventual silver medalist, Hugo Grau from France, via unanimous decision.
