= Hopey Price =

British boxer (born 2000)

Personal information
- Nickname: Drago
- Nationality: English
- Born: Ivan Hope Price; 6 March 2000 (age 26) Leeds, Yorkshire, England
- Height: 5 ft 8 1/2 in (174 cm)
- Weight: Super-bantamweight

Boxing career
- Stance: Southpaw

Boxing record
- Total fights: 12
- Wins: 12
- Win by KO: 5
- Losses: 0
Medal record
Representing Great Britain
Youth Olympic Games
Gold medal – first place	2018 Buenos Aires	Flyweight
Representing England
Youth World Championships
Silver medal – second place	2018 Budapest	Flyweight
European Youth Championships
Gold medal – first place	2018 Roseto	Flyweight
Silver medal – second place	2017 Antalya	Flyweight

Ivan Hope Price (born 6 March 2000), better known as Hopey Price, is an English professional boxer. As an amateur, he won silver medals at the 2017 European Youth Championships and 2018 Youth World Championships, and gold at the 2018 European Youth Championships and 2018 Youth Olympics; becoming the first boxer from Great Britain to win gold at a Youth Olympic Games.

== Professional career ==
In October 2019, it was announced Price had signed a promotional contract with Eddie Hearn's Matchroom Boxing and would make his professional debut the following month. The fight took place on 2 November 2019 at the Manchester Arena, Manchester, with Price scoring a four-round points decision victory over Joel Sanchez on the undercard of Katie Taylor's world title challenge against Christina Linardatou. Price was back in action one month later to defeat Swedi Mohamed via third-round technical knockout (TKO) on 7 December at the Diriyah Arena in Diriyah, Saudi Arabia.

Hopey continued his run of wins with a points victory over Claudio Grande in a six-round fight on 14 August 2021 and then with a 2nd round stoppage of Zahid Hussain on 4 September 2021.

== Professional boxing record ==
10 fights	10 wins	0 losses
By knockout	3	0
By decision	7	0

No.	Result	Record	Opponent	Type	Round, time	Date	Location	Notes
12	Win	12–0	(United Kingdom) Connor Coghill	TKO	12, 1:29	7 Oct 2023	(United Kingdom) Sheffield Arena, Sheffield	Coghill down once in the 6th, once in the 11th and twice in the 12th.
11	Win	11–0	(United Kingdom) James Beech Jr.	RTD	7(10) 3:00	1 Jul 2023	(United Kingdom) Sheffield Arena, Sheffield	Beach Jnr cut over the left eye in the 6th round and the right eye in the 7th.
10	Win	10–0	(France) Thomas Masson	UD	10	18 Mar 2023	(United Kingdom) Newcastle Arena, Newcastle	
9	Win	9–0	(Spain) Jonathan Santana	PTS	8	10 Dec 2022	(United Kingdom) First Direct Arena, Leeds	Santana down in the 3rd round.
8	Win	8–0	(Nicaragua) Alexander Mejia	PTS	8	6 Aug 2022	(United Kingdom) Sheffield Arena, Sheffield	
7	Win	7–0	(Mexico) Ricardo Roman	TKO	4(6) 1:09	12 Feb 2022	(United Kingdom) Alexandra Palace, Muswell Hill	Roman down once in the 1st round and once in the 4th.
6	Win	6–0	(United Kingdom) Zahid Hussain	TKO	2 (10), 2:33	4 Sep 2021	(United Kingdom) Headingley Stadium, Leeds, England	Won vacant IBO International super-bantamweight title
5	Win	5–0	(Italy) Claudio Grande	PTS	6	14 Aug 2021	(United Kingdom) Matchroom Headquarters, Brentwood, England	
4	Win	4–0	(Nicaragua) Daniel Mendoza	PTS	6	13 Feb 2021	(United Kingdom) The SSE Arena, London, England	
3	Win	3–0	(United Kingdom) Jonny Phillips	PTS	6	7 Aug 2020	(United Kingdom) Matchroom Headquarters, Brentwood, England	
2	Win	2–0	(Tanzania) Swedi Mohamed	TKO	3 (4), 2:26	7 Dec 2019	Diriyah Arena, Diriyah, Saudi Arabia	
1	Win	1–0	(Nicaragua) Joel Sanchez	PTS	4	2 Nov 2019	(United Kingdom) Manchester Arena, Manchester, England	
