= Gymnastics at the 2018 Summer Youth Olympics – Boys' artistic qualification =

The boys' artistic gymnastics qualification at the 2018 Summer Youth Olympics was held at the America Pavilion from 7 to 10 October. The results of the qualification determined the qualifiers to the finals: 18 gymnasts in the all-around final, and 8 gymnasts in each of 6 apparatus finals.

== Schedule ==
All times are local (UTC−3).

Date	Time	Round
Sunday, 7 October	14:03	Pommel horse qualification
Sunday, 7 October	19:06	Floor exercise qualification
Monday, 8 October	14:03	Rings qualification
Monday, 8 October	19:03	Vault qualification
Tuesday, 9 October	19:07	Parallel bars qualification
Wednesday, 10 October	19:05	Horizontal bar qualification

== Results ==
=== All-around ===
Rank	Name	Floor (gymnastics)	Pommel horse	Rings (gymnastics)	Vault (gymnastics)	Parallel bars	Horizontal bar	Total	Qualification
1	Takeru Kitazono (JPN)	13.500	14.133	13.700	14.100	14.266	13.600	83.299	Q
2	Sergei Naidin (RUS)	13.800	13.666	12.866	13.883	13.933	13.300	81.448	Q
3	Yin Dehang (CHN)	13.233	13.866	13.500	14.133/12.883; Avg: 13.474	13.566	12.533	80.831	Q
4	Brandon Briones (USA)	13.900	12.633	13.533	14.116/13.900; Avg: 14.033	13.266	13.000	80.498	Q
5	Adam Tobin (GBR)	13.633	13.000	13.300	13.700	13.341	12.700	79.674	Q
6	Diogo Soares (BRA)	13.066	12.733	12.966	14.066/13.300; Avg: 13.683	13.300	13.300	79.431	Q
7	Félix Dolci (CAN)	13.433	12.133	13.466	14.200/13.700; Avg: 13.950	12.500	13.233	78.965	Q
8	Lay Giannini (ITA)	13.566	12.100	12.900	13.883	13.233	12.933	78.615	Q
9	Krisztián Balázs (HUN)	13.533	12.533	12.833	12.666	13.400	13.366	78.331	Q
10	Nazar Chepurnyi (UKR)	13.566	12.400	12.266	13.000/14.100; Avg: 13.550	13.833	12.400	77.465	Q
11	Daniel Schwed (GER)	13.483	13.233	12.033	13.433	12.333	12.500	77.015	Q
12	Jacob Karlsen (NOR)	13.100	11.600	12.866	14.258/13.100; Avg: 13.679	12.266	12.133	76.223	Q
13	Oļegs Ivanovs (LAT)	11.566	11.433	13.100	14.100/10.166; Avg: 12.133	12.900	12.733	75.832	Q
14	Bora Tarhan (TUR)	12.066	11.733	12.700	13.633/12.766; Avg: 13.199	12.700	11.800	74.632	Q
15	Ward Claeys (BEL)	12.666	12.633	11.700	12.766	12.966	11.800	74.531	Q
16	Marcus Stenberg (SWE)	13.200	11.300	12.566	12.966	12.100	12.300	74.432	Q
17	Sam Dick (NZL)	12.933	11.033	12.700	14.166/13.266; Avg: 13.716	11.800	11.633	74.265	Q
18	Reza Bohloulzade Hajlari (IRI)	12.766	13.166	11.300	12.333	12.800	11.766	74.131	Q
19	Gabriel Burtănete (ROU)	12.266	12.133	12.300	14.433/13.033; Avg: 13.733	11.133	11.500	73.765	R1
20	Yeh Cheng (TPE)	12.933	10.600	12.100	14.066	12.000	11.900	73.599	R2
21	Nguyễn Văn Khánh Phong (VIE)	12.566	11.400	12.633	12.733	13.333	10.666	73.331	R3
22	Vlada Raković (SRB)	12.666	9.900	12.766	12.800	12.333	12.700	73.165	R4
23	Pablo Calvache (ECU)	12.266	9.658	12.566	14.000	11.800	12.566	72.856	
24	Michael Torres (PUR)	12.100	11.633	12.016	13.133	12.966	10.600	72.448	
25	Samad Mammadli (AZE)	12.900	11.400	9.933	12.766	13.066	12.266	72.331	
26	Mohamed Afify (EGY)	10.766	11.600	12.433	13.466/12.691; Avg: 13.078	11.733	11.966	71.964	
27	Abdulaziz Mirvaliev (UZB)	13.066	10.000	12.366	13.533/12.866; Avg: 13.199	12.533	10.433	71.931	
28	Martin Guðmundsson (ISL)	13.250	10.533	11.833	13.733/13.166; Avg: 13.449	11.233	11.266	71.848	
29	Fernando Espíndola (ARG)	11.666	10.166	12.333	13.800/13.333; Avg: 13.566	12.500	11.366	71.831	
30	Ayan Moldagaliyev (KAZ)	9.900	12.725	11.800	12.333	13.366	11.300	71.424	
31	Víctor Betancourt (VEN)	11.900	10.900	12.266	11.900	13.166	10.166	70.298	
32	Byun Seong-won (KOR)	13.066	9.041	11.633	12.933	12.033	11.400	70.106	
33	Ruan Lange (RSA)	10.408	9.033	11.600	13.166/11.866; Avg: 12.516	11.533	12.066	67.806	
34	Uri Zeidel (ISR)	12.166	6.633	11.266	10.166	13.200	10.925	64.356	
	Mathys Cordule (FRA)		10.900					DNF	
	Ondřej Kalný (CZE)							DNS	

=== Pommel horse ===
Rank	Gymnast	D Score	E Score	Pen.	Total	Qualification
1	Takeru Kitazono (JPN)	5.200	8.933		14.133	Q
2	Yin Dehang (CHN)	5.400	8.466		13.866	Q
3	Sergei Naidin (RUS)	5.000	8.666		13.666	Q
4	Daniel Schwed (GER)	5.000	8.233		13.233	Q
5	Reza Bohloulzade Hajlari (IRI)	4.400	8.766		13.166	Q
6	Adam Tobin (GBR)	4.600	8.400		13.000	Q
7	Diogo Soares (BRA)	4.600	8.133		12.733	Q
8	Ayan Moldagaliyev (KAZ)	4.500	8.225		12.725	Q
9	Brandon Briones (USA)	4.500	8.133		12.633	R1
10	Ward Claeys (BEL)	4.600	8.033		12.633	R2
11	Krisztián Balázs (HUN)	4.200	8.333		12.533	R3

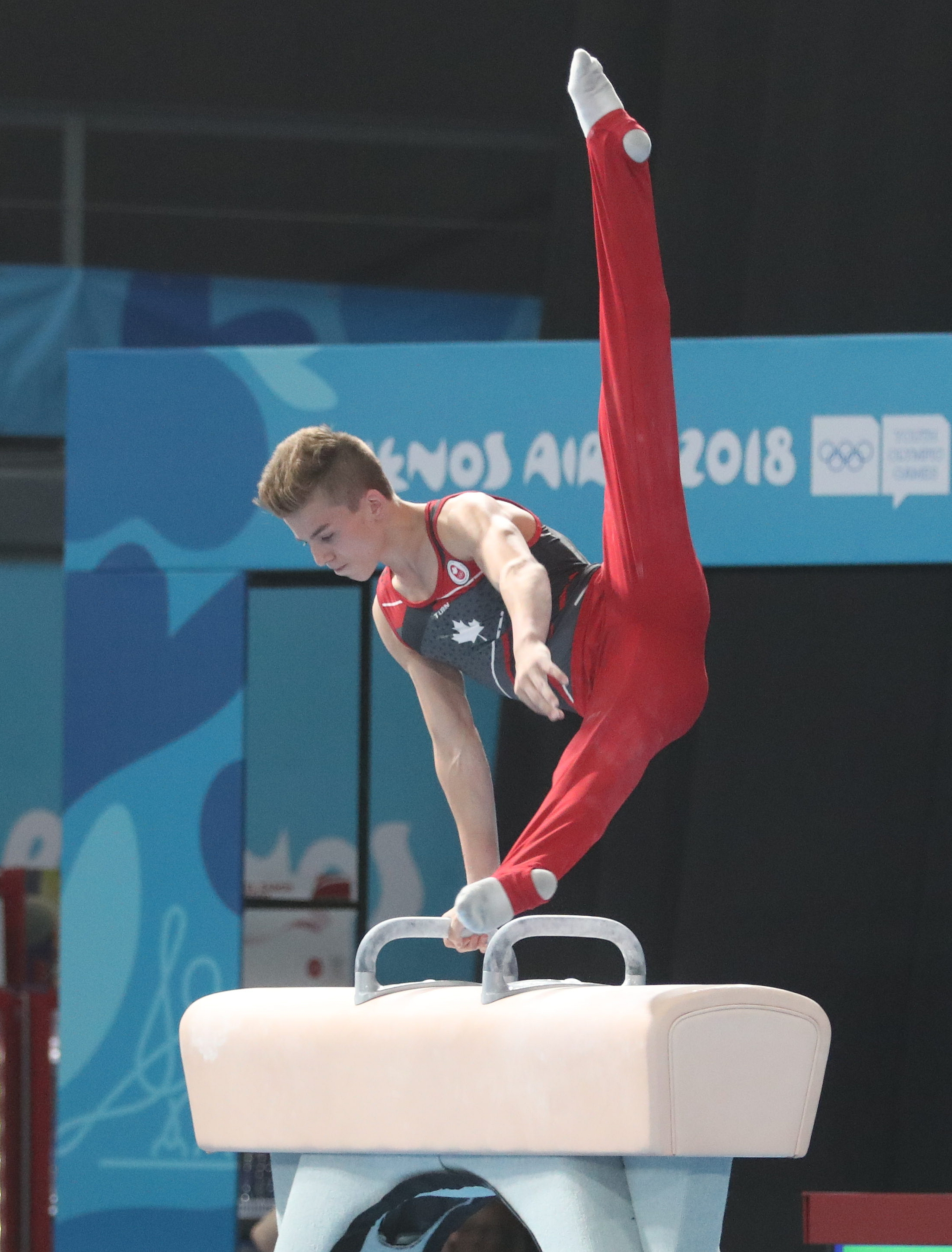
Félix Dolci (rank 12)

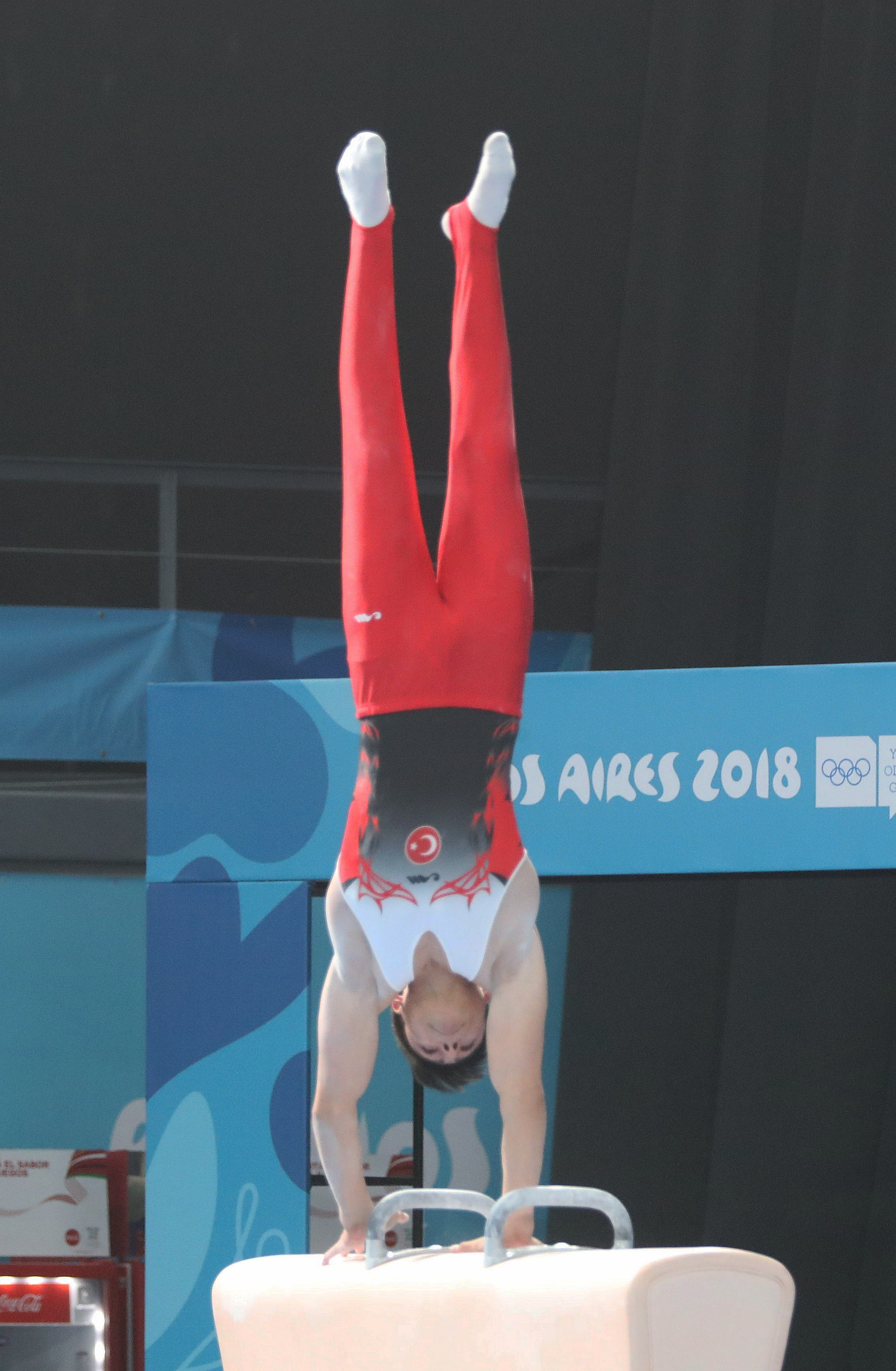
Bora Tarhan (rank 15)

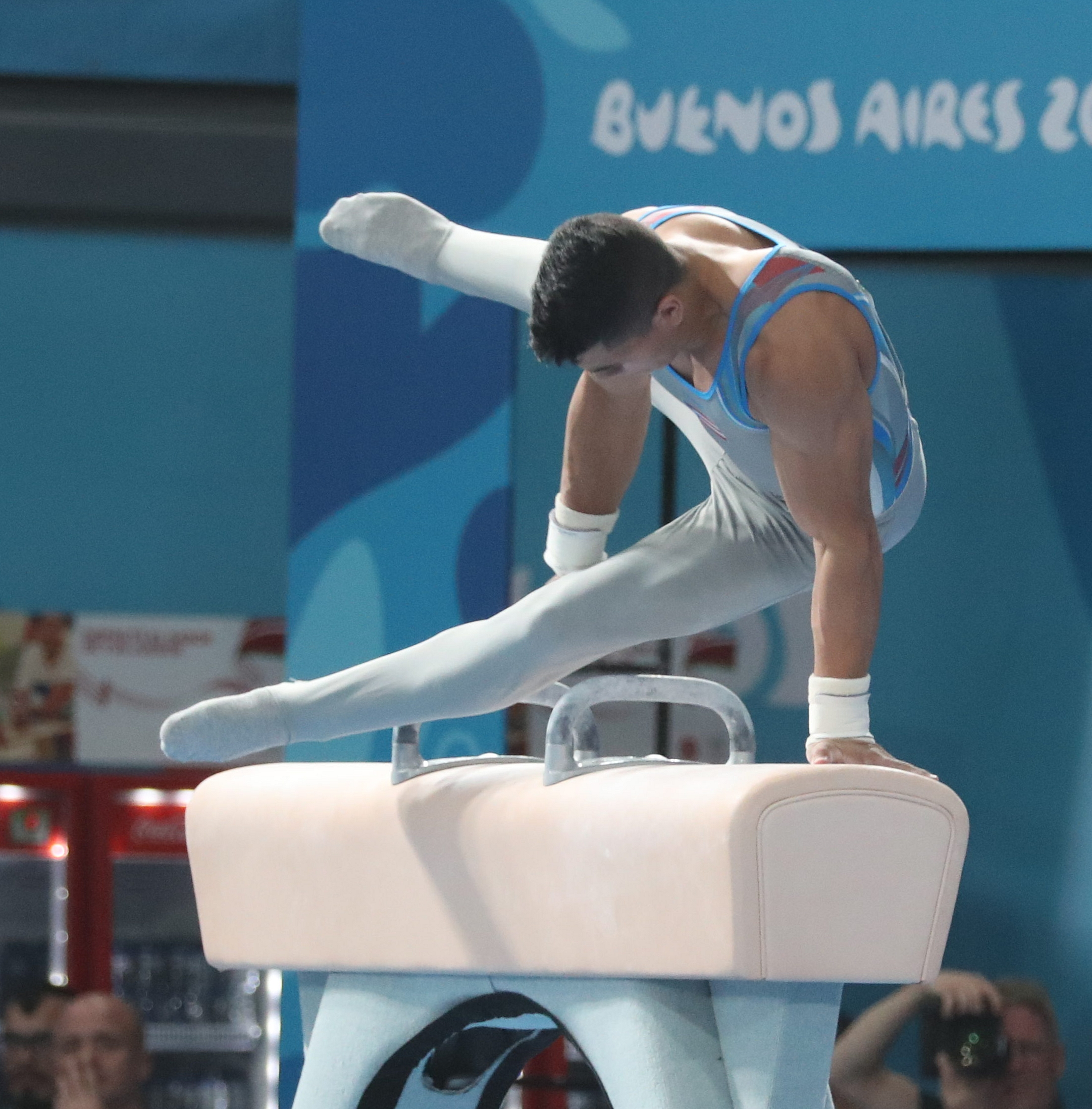
Michael Torres (rank 16)

=== Floor exercise ===
Rank	Gymnast	D Score	E Score	Pen.	Total	Qualification
1	Brandon Briones (USA)	4.700	9.200		13.900	Q
2	Sergei Naidin (RUS)	5.000	8.800		13.800	Q
3	Adam Tobin (GBR)	4.900	8.733		13.633	Q
4	Lay Giannini (ITA)	4.500	9.066		13.566	Q
5	Nazar Chepurnyi (UKR)	5.000	8.666	−0.1	13.566	Q
6	Krisztián Balázs (HUN)	5.000	8.533		13.533	Q
7	Takeru Kitazono (JPN)	4.900	8.600		13.500	Q
8	Daniel Schwed (GER)	4.600	8.883		13.483	Q
9	Félix Dolci (CAN)	5.100	8.433	−0.1	13.433	R1
10	Martin Guðmundsson (ISL)	4.700	8.550		13.250	R2
11	Yin Dehang (CHN)	4.900	8.433	−0.1	13.233	R3

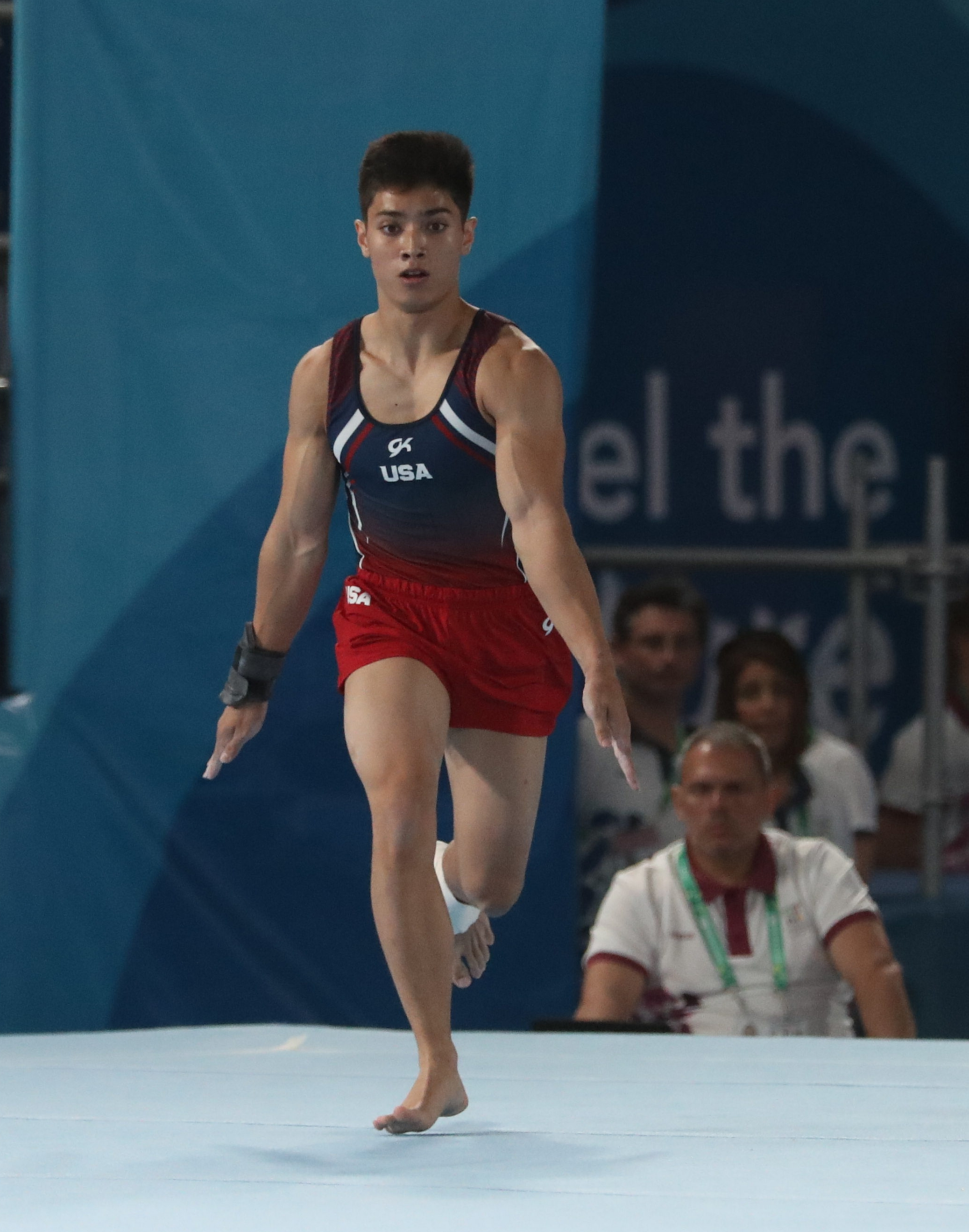
Brandon Briones

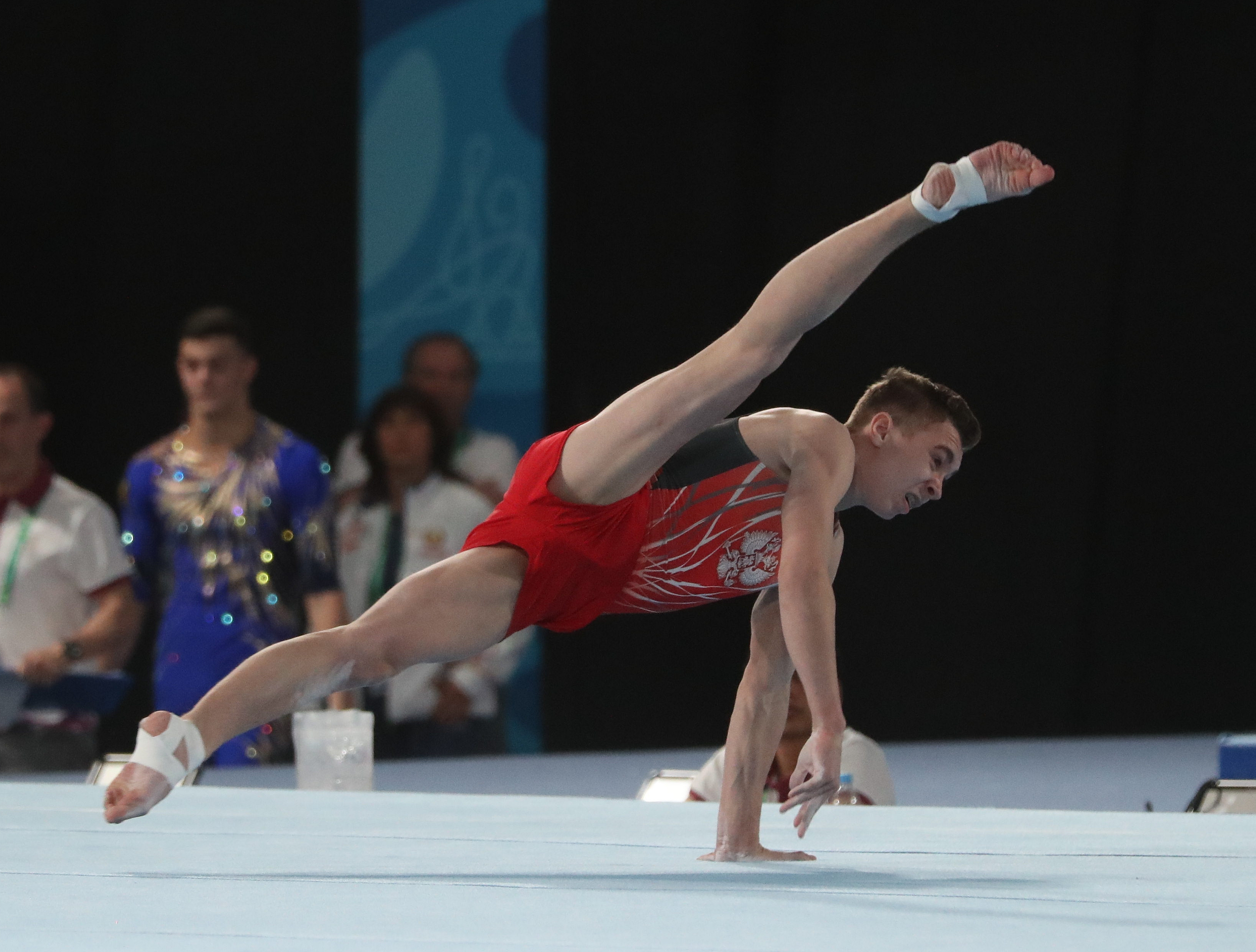
Sergei Naidin

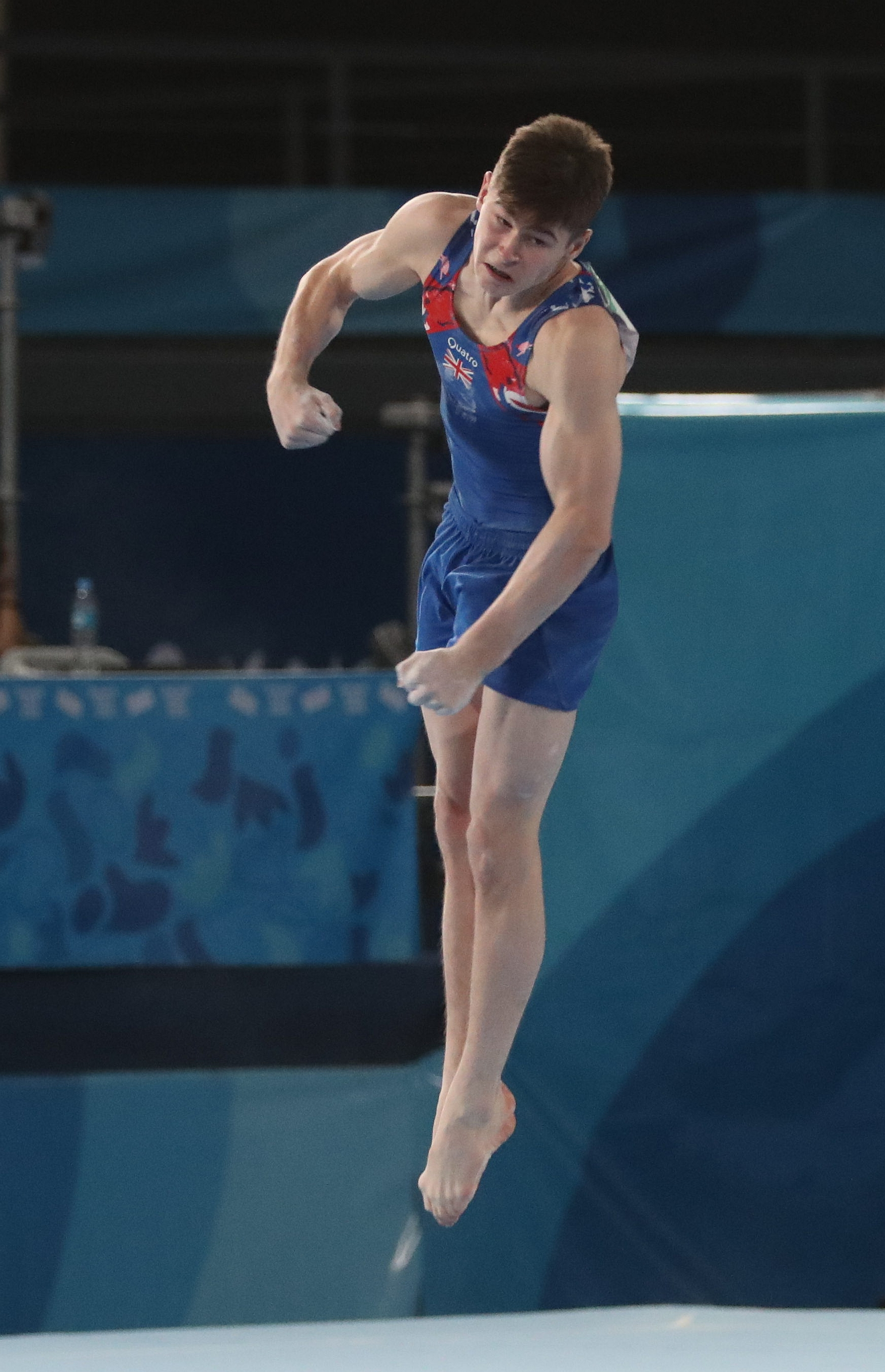
Adam Tobin

=== Rings ===
Rank	Gymnast	D Score	E Score	Pen.	Total	Qualification
1	Takeru Kitazono (JPN)	4.800	8.900		13.700	Q
2	Brandon Briones (USA)	4.600	8.933		13.533	Q
3	Yin Dehang (CHN)	5.100	8.400		13.500	Q
4	Félix Dolci (CAN)	4.500	8.966		13.466	Q
5	Adam Tobin (GBR)	4.200	9.100		13.300	Q
6	Oļegs Ivanovs (LAT)	4.200	8.900		13.100	Q
7	Diogo Soares (BRA)	4.500	8.466		12.966	Q
8	Lay Giannini (ITA)	4.000	8.900		12.900	Q
9	Sergei Naidin (RUS)	4.100	8.766		12.866	R1
10	Jacob Karlsen (NOR)	4.200	8.666		12.866	R2
11	Krisztián Balázs (HUN)	4.200	8.633		12.833	R3

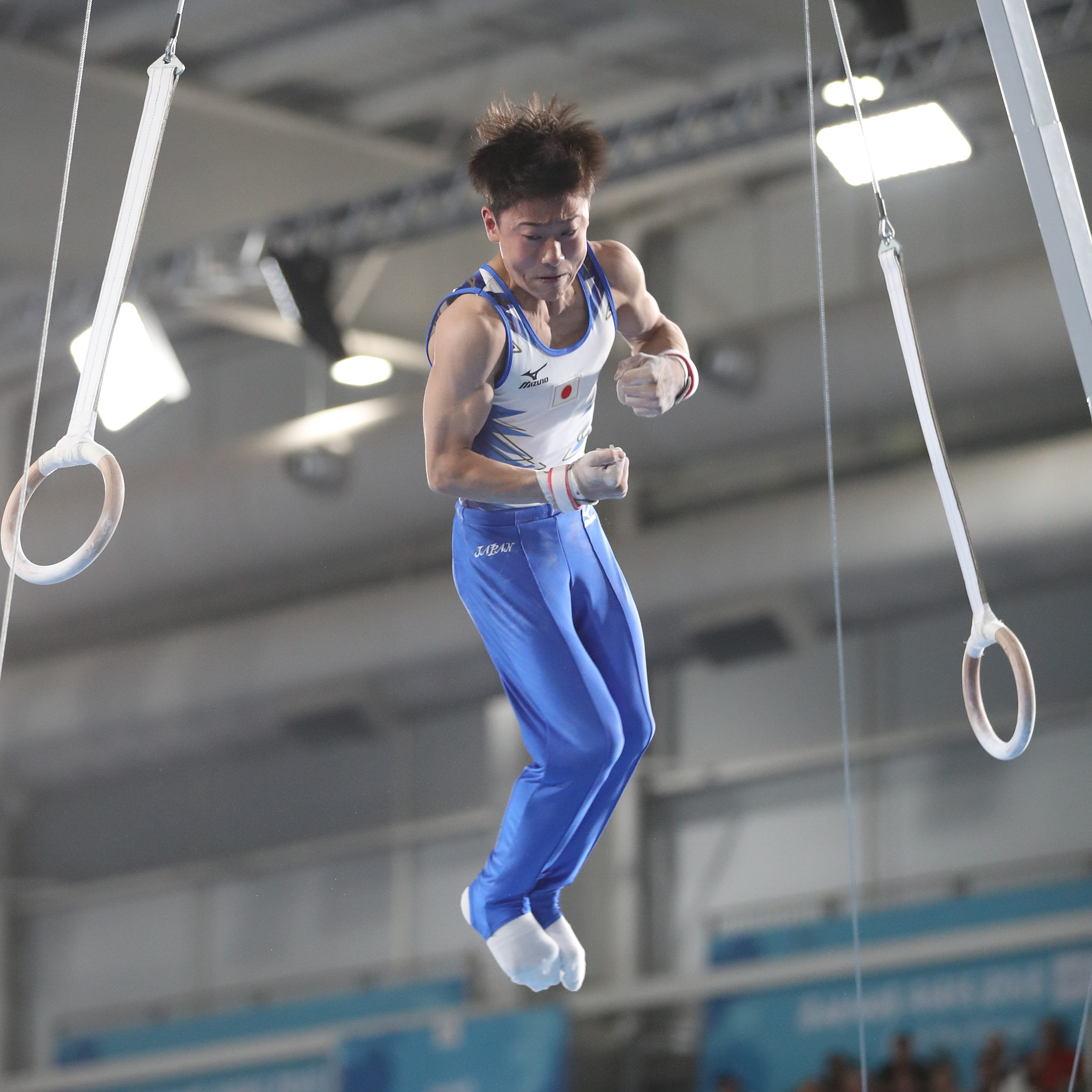
Takeru Kitazono

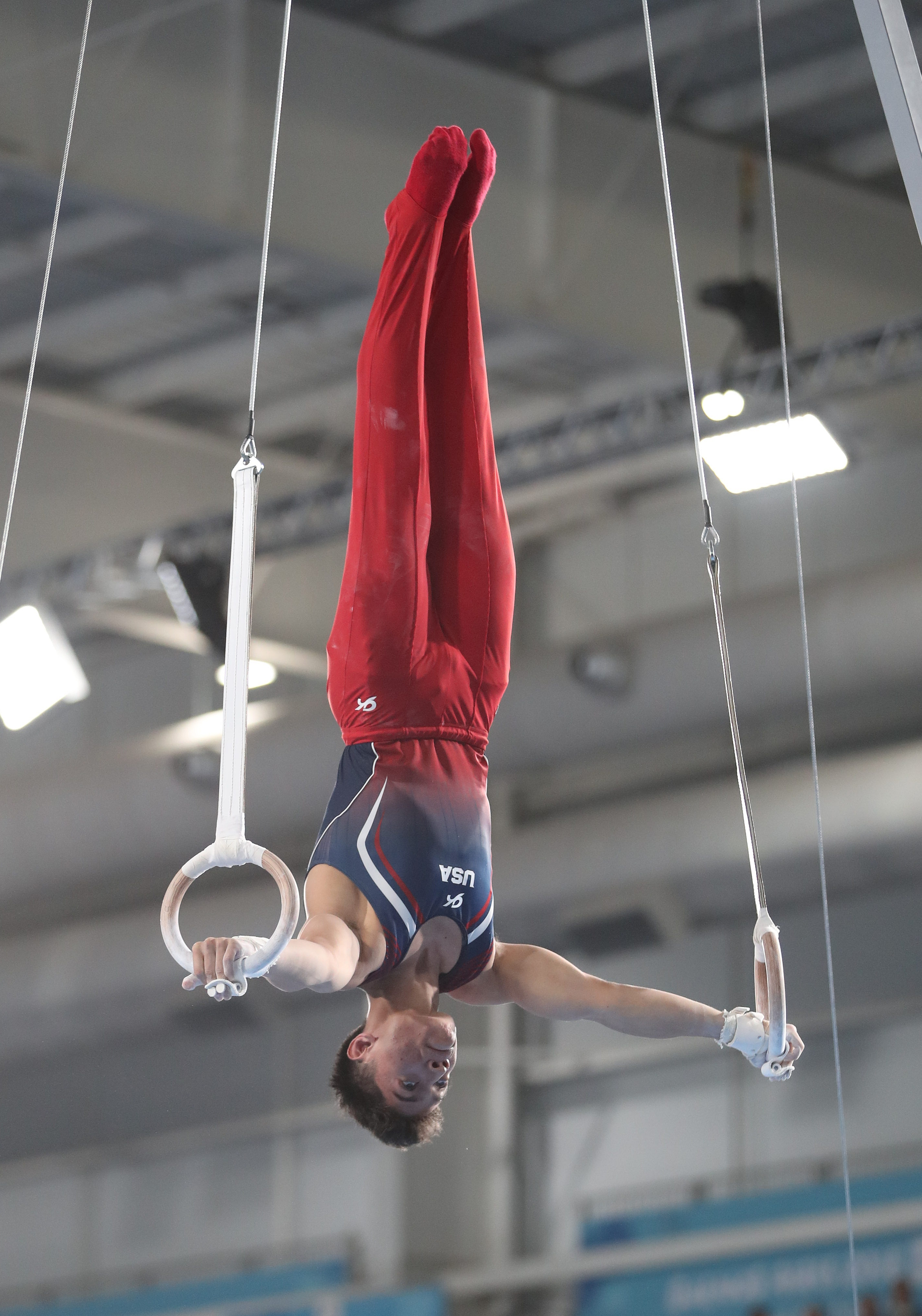
Brandon Briones

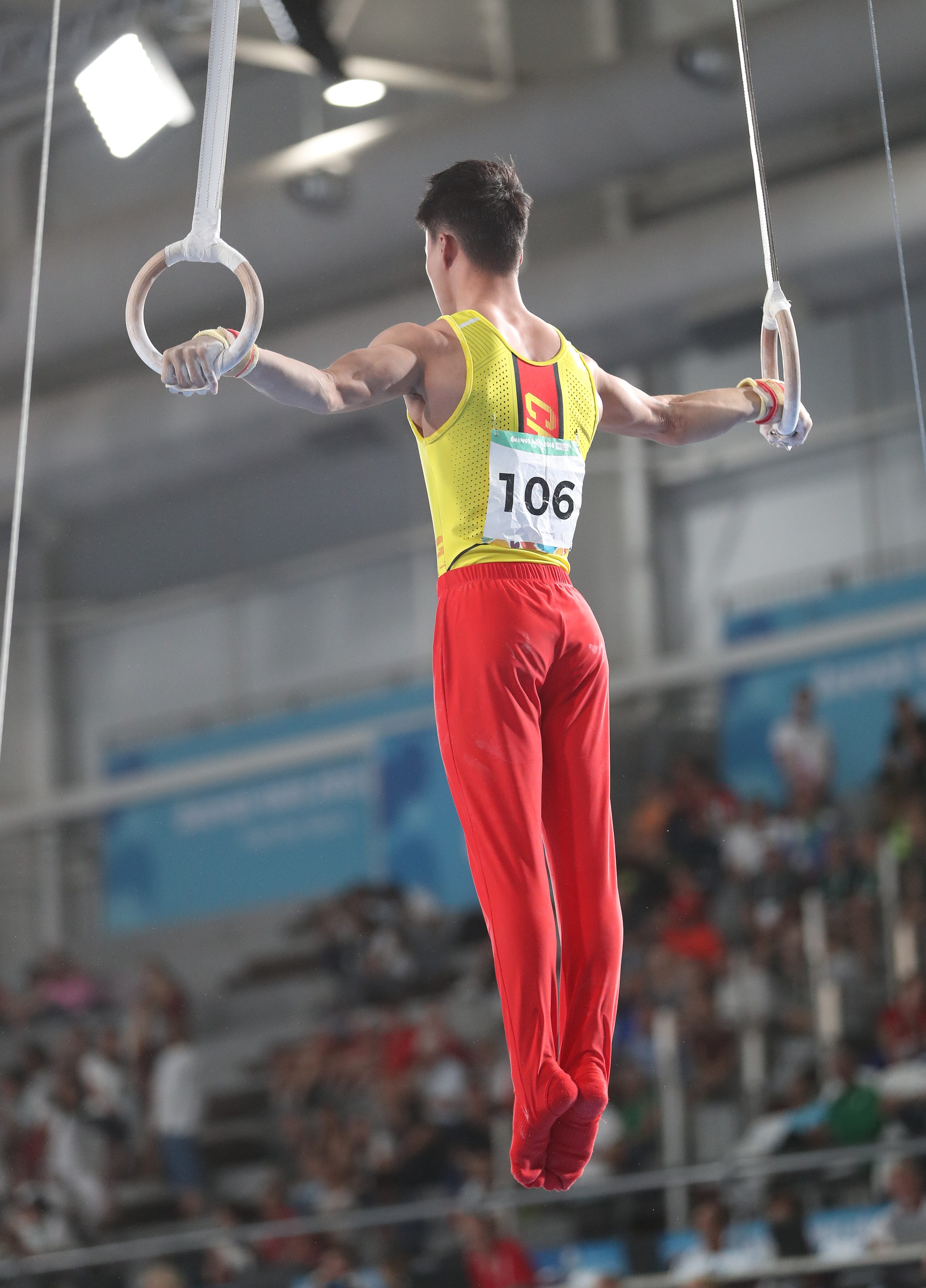
Yin Dehang

=== Vault ===
Rank	Gymnast	D Score	E Score	Pen.	Score 1	D Score	E Score	Pen.	Score 2	Total	Qualification
Rank	Gymnast	Vault 1				Vault 2				Total	Qualification
1	Brandon Briones (USA)	5.200	8.966		14.166	4.800	9.100		13.900	14.033	Q
2	Félix Dolci (CAN)	5.200	9.100	-0.1	14.200	5.200	8.500		13.700	13.950	Q
3	Gabriel Burtănete (ROU)	5.200	9.233		14.433	5.200	7.833		13.033	13.733	Q
4	Sam Dick (NZL)	5.200	8.966		14.166	4.000	9.266		13.266	13.716	Q
5	Diogo Soares (BRA)	4.800	9.266		14.066	4.000	9.300		13.300	13.683	Q
6	Jacob Karlsen (NOR)	4.800	9.458		14.258	4.000	9.100		13.100	13.679	Q
7	Fernando Espíndola (ARG)	4.800	9.000		13.800	4.000	9.333		13.333	13.566	Q
8	Nazar Chepurnyi (UKR)	5.200	7.900	-0.1	13.000	4.800	9.300		14.100	13.550	Q
9	Yeh Cheng (TPE)	5.200	8.866		14.066	4.000	8.883		12.883	13.474	R1
10	Martin Guðmundsson (ISL)	4.800	9.033	-0.1	13.733	4.000	9.166		13.166	13.449	R2
11	Bora Tarhan (TUR)	4.800	8.933	-0.1	13.633	5.200	7.566		12.766	13.199	R3

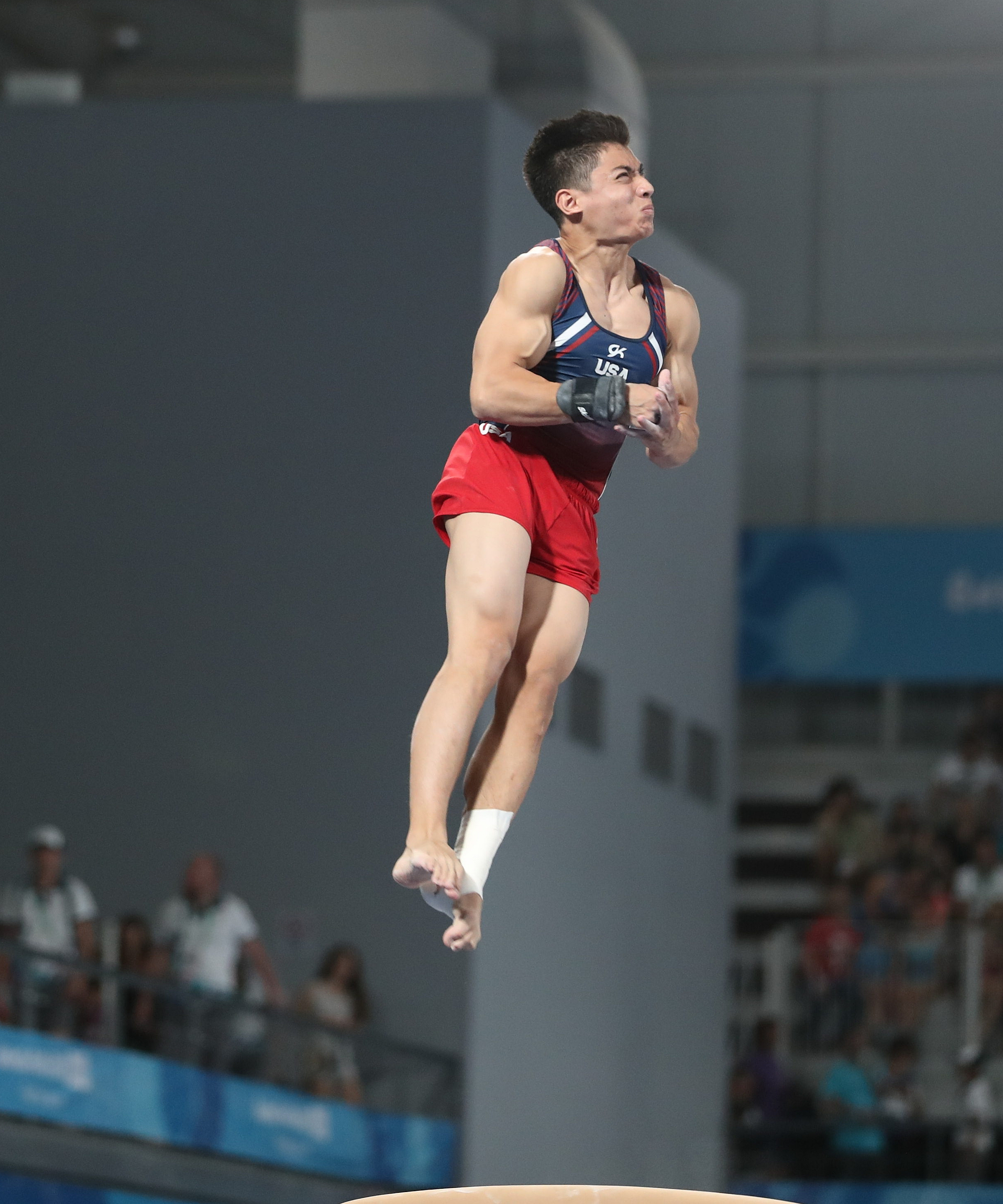
Brandon Briones

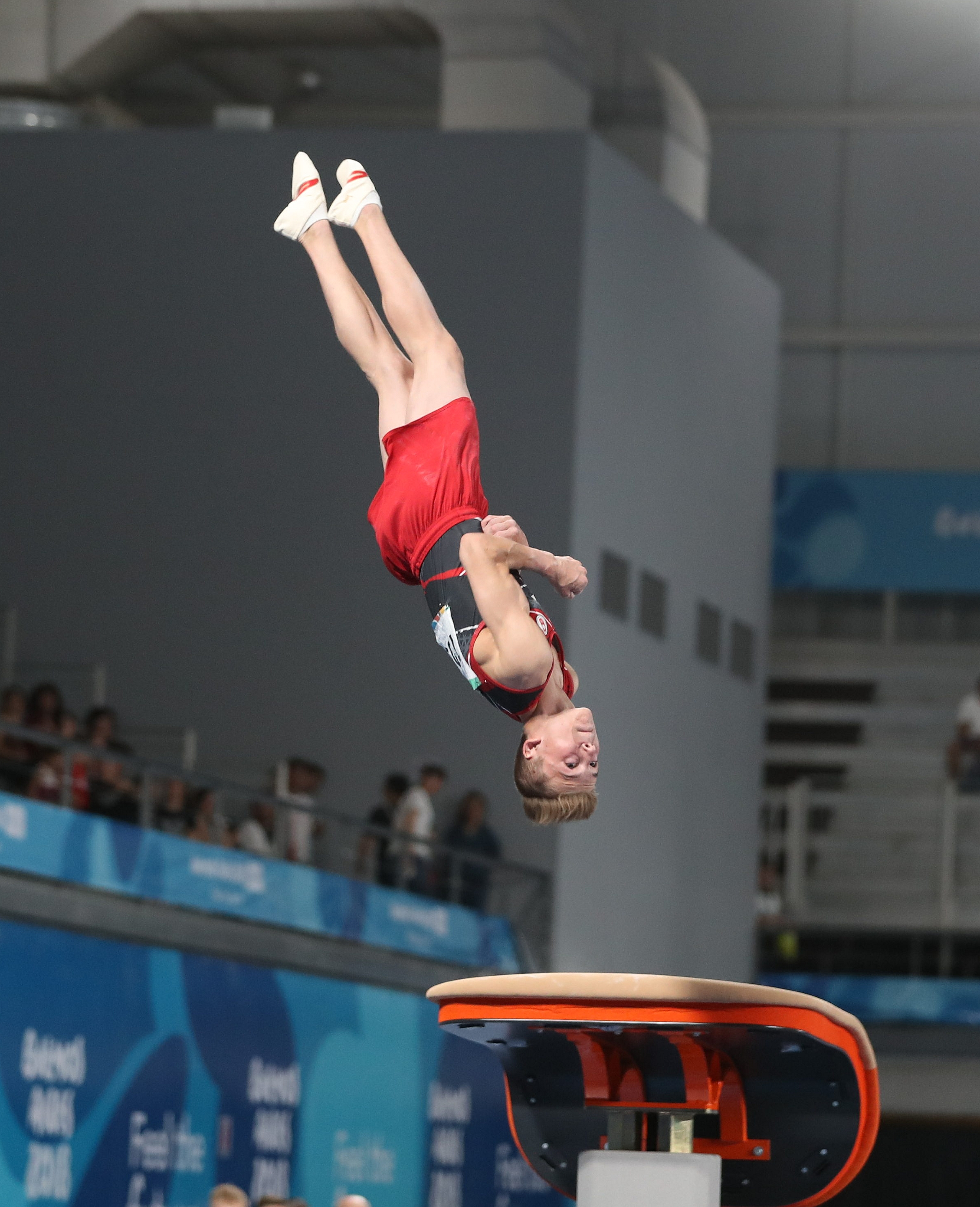
Félix Dolci

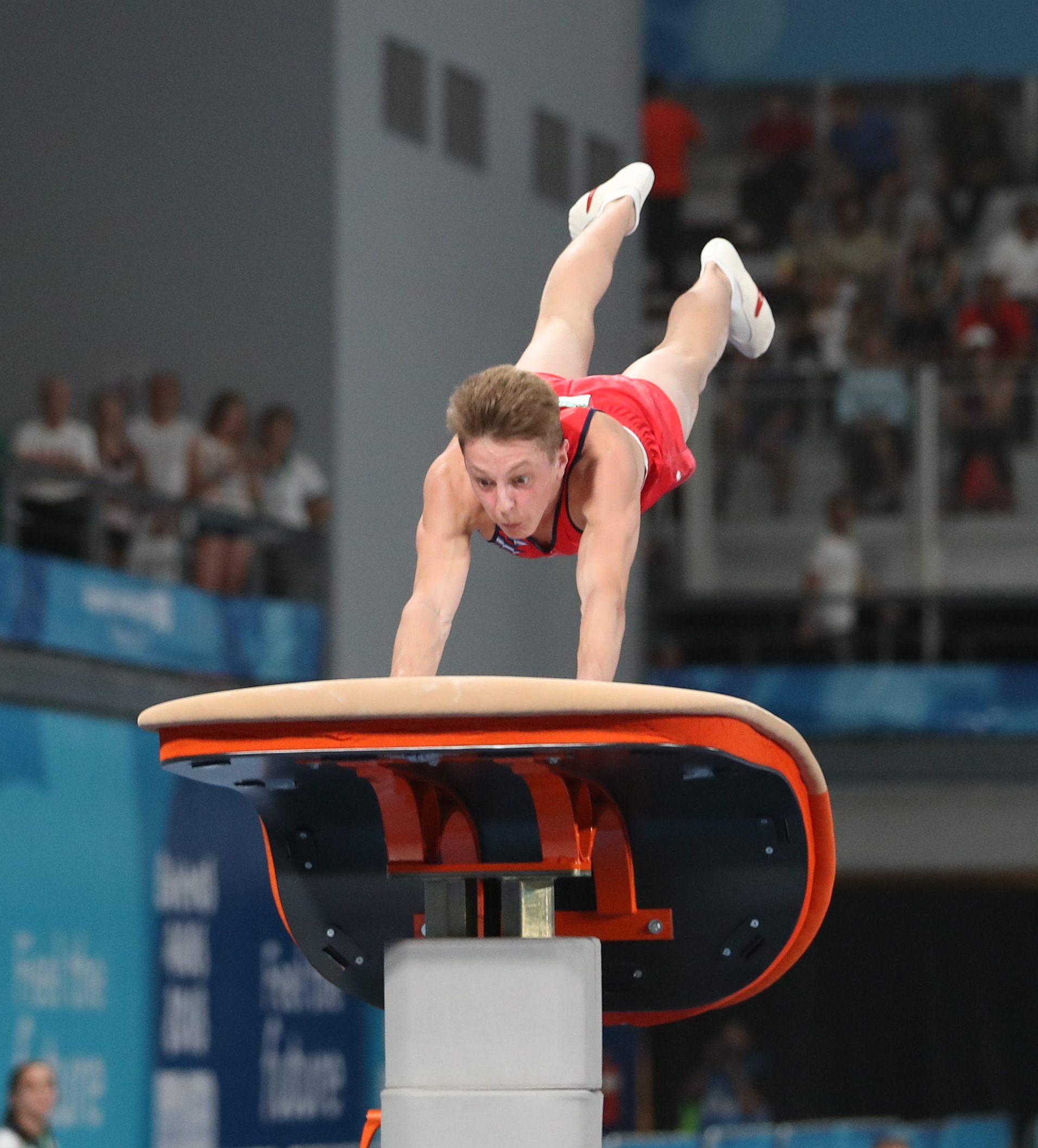
Gabriel Burtănete

=== Parallel bars ===
Rank	Gymnast	D Score	E Score	Pen.	Total	Qualification
1	Takeru Kitazono (JPN)	5.500	8.766		14.266	Q
2	Sergei Naidin (RUS)	5.100	8.833		13.933	Q
3	Nazar Chepurnyi (UKR)	5.200	8.633		13.833	Q
4	Yin Dehang (CHN)	5.200	8.366		13.566	Q
5	Krisztián Balázs (HUN)	4.800	8.600		13.400	Q
6	Ayan Moldagaliyev (KAZ)	4.400	8.966		13.366	Q
7	Adam Tobin (GBR)	4.500	8.841		13.341	Q
8	Nguyễn Văn Khánh Phong (VIE)	4.500	8.833		13.333	Q
9	Diogo Soares (BRA)	4.500	8.800		13.300	R1
10	Brandon Briones (USA)	4.700	8.566		13.266	R2
11	Lay Giannini (ITA)	4.300	8.933		13.233	R3

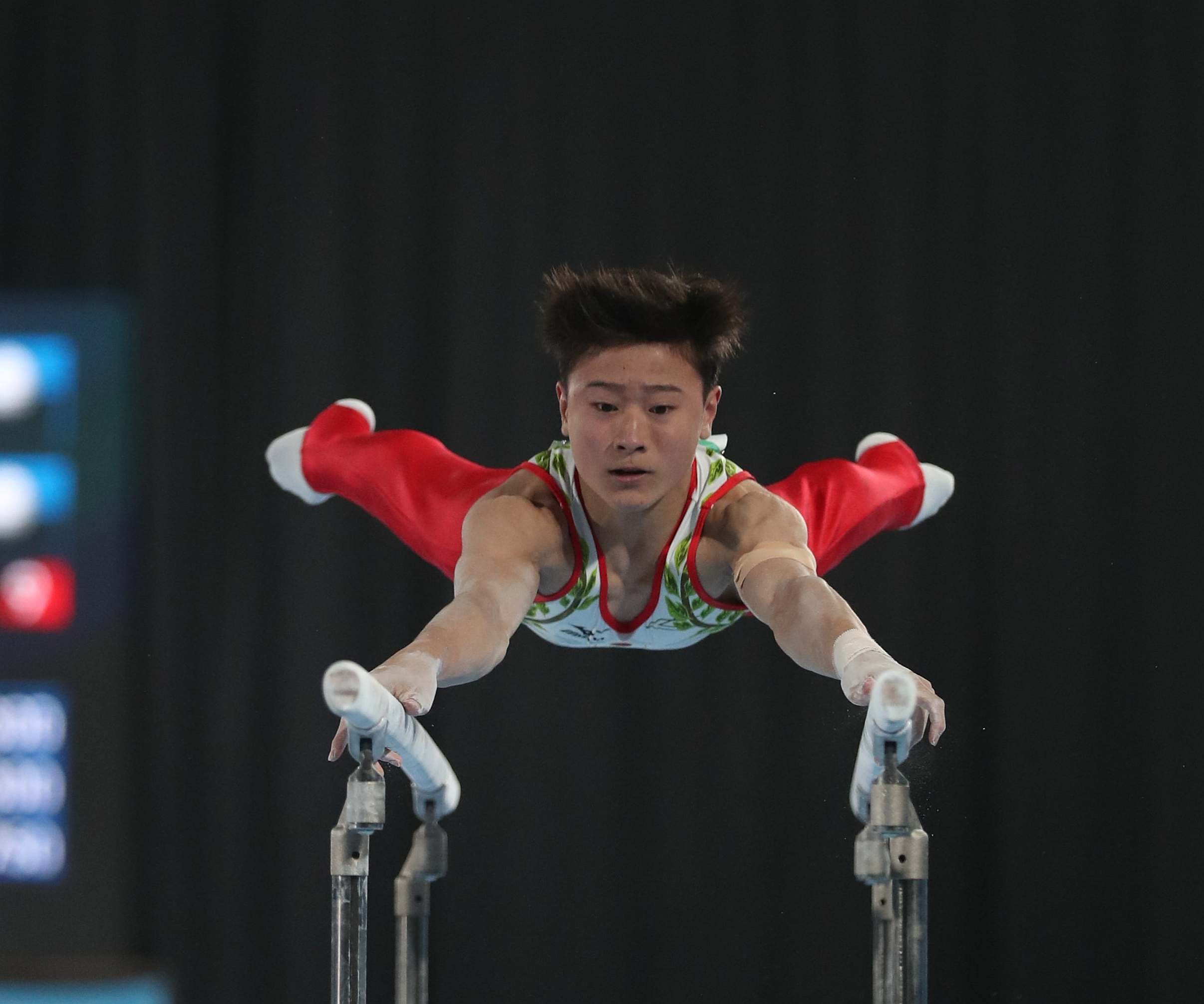
Takeru Kitazono

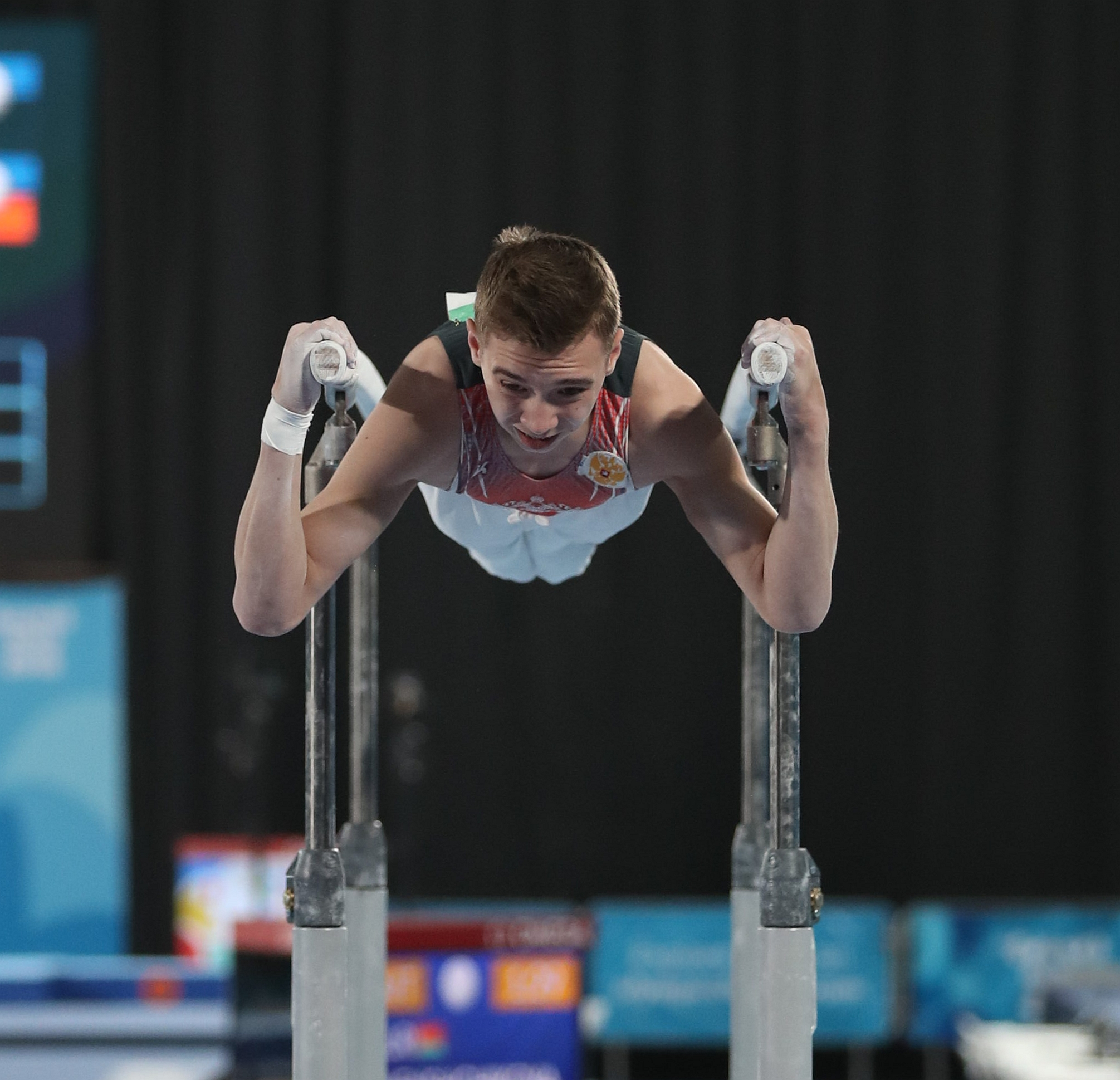
Sergei Naidin

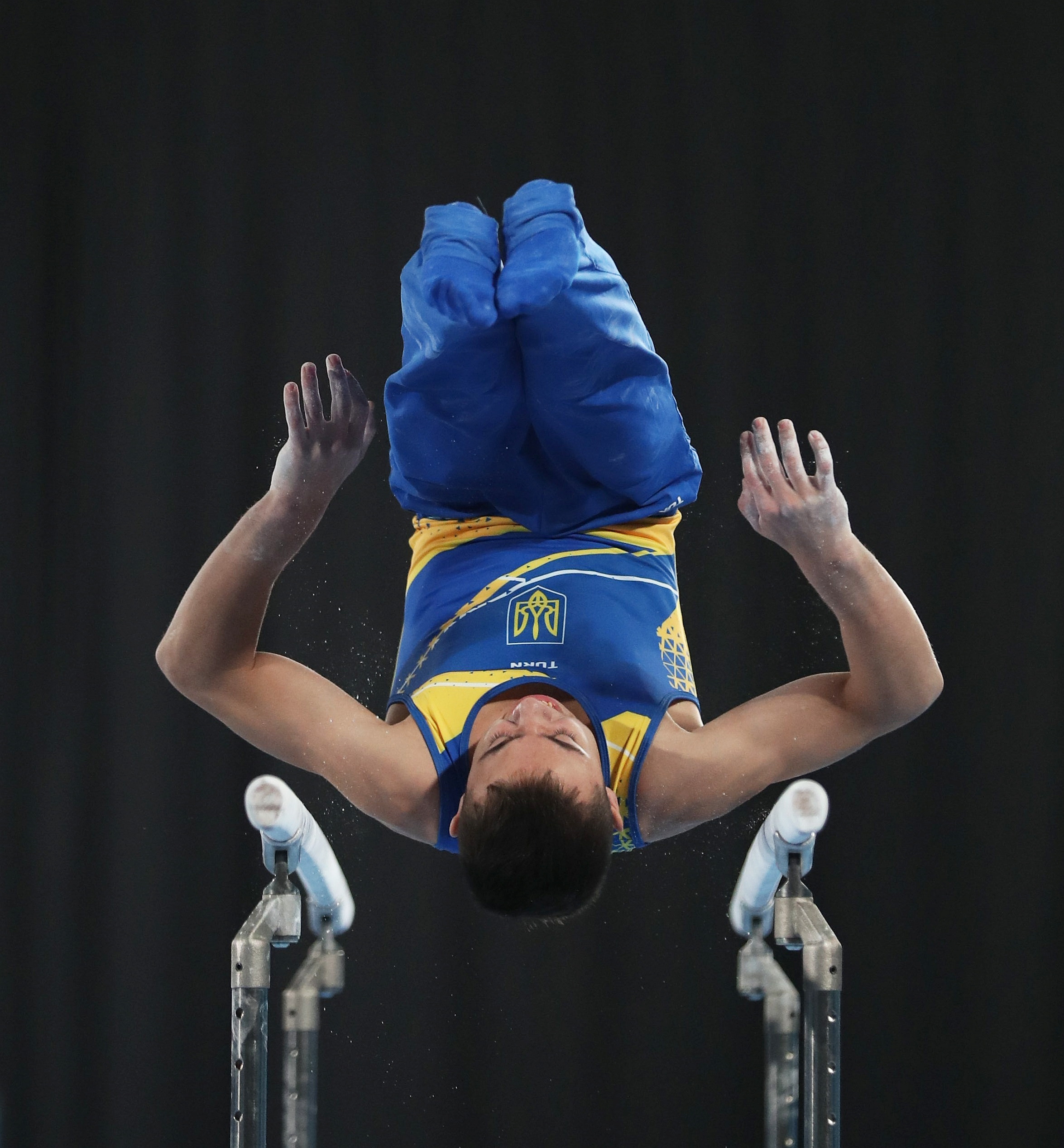
Nazar Chepurnyi

=== Horizontal bar ===
Rank	Gymnast	D Score	E Score	Pen.	Total	Qualification
1	Takeru Kitazono (JPN)	5.000	8.600		13.600	Q
2	Krisztián Balázs (HUN)	4.400	8.966		13.366	Q
3	Diogo Soares (BRA)	4.600	8.700		13.300	Q
4	Sergei Naidin (RUS)	4.700	8.600		13.300	Q
5	Félix Dolci (CAN)	4.300	8.933		13.233	Q
6	Brandon Briones (USA)	4.600	8.400		13.000	Q
7	Lay Giannini (ITA)	4.500	8.433		12.933	Q
8	Oļegs Ivanovs (LAT)	4.500	8.233		12.733	Q
9	Vlada Raković (SRB)	4.000	8.700		12.700	R1
10	Adam Tobin (GBR)	4.200	8.500		12.700	R2
11	Pablo Calvache (ECU)	4.200	8.366		12.566	R3

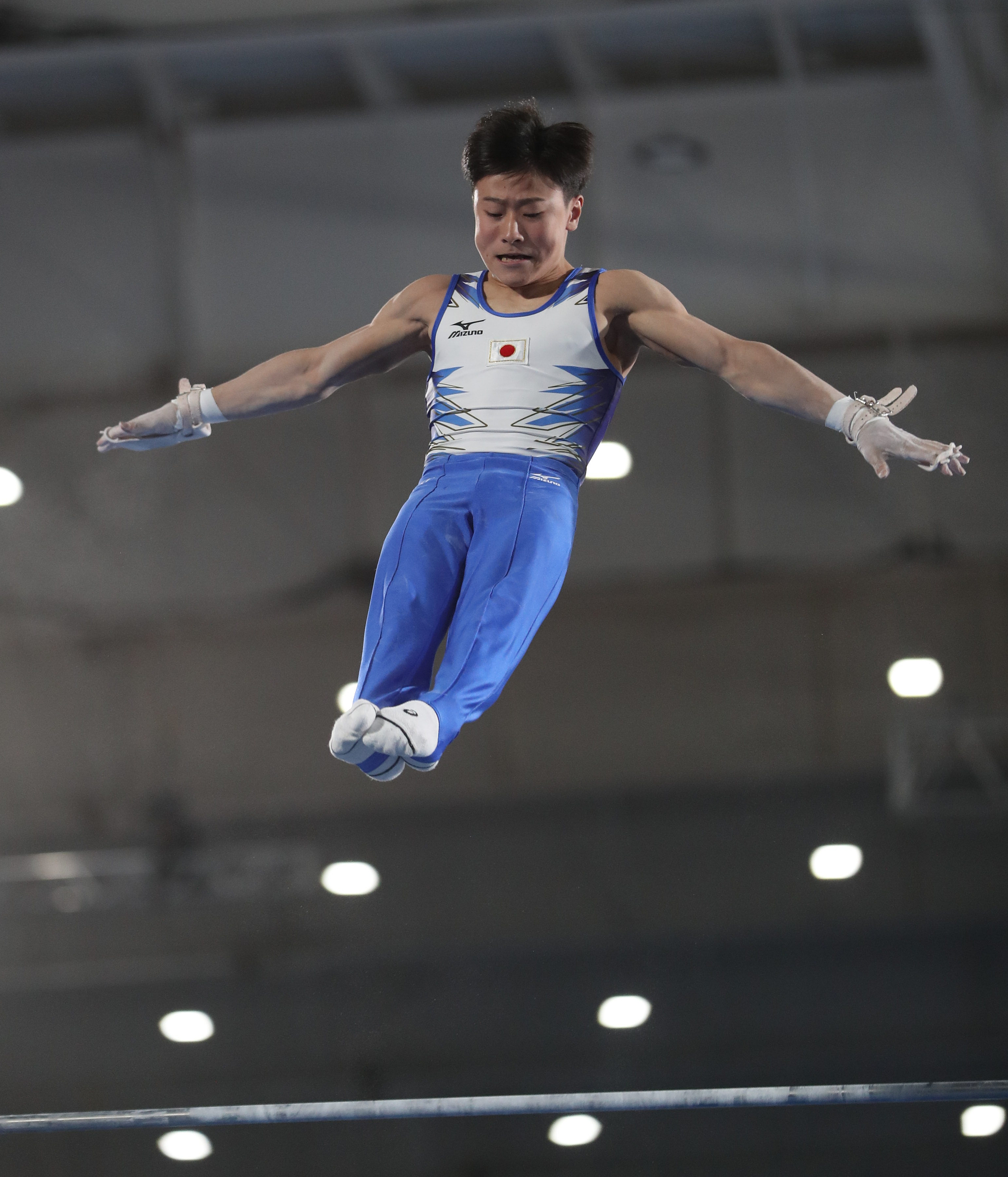
Takeru Kitazono

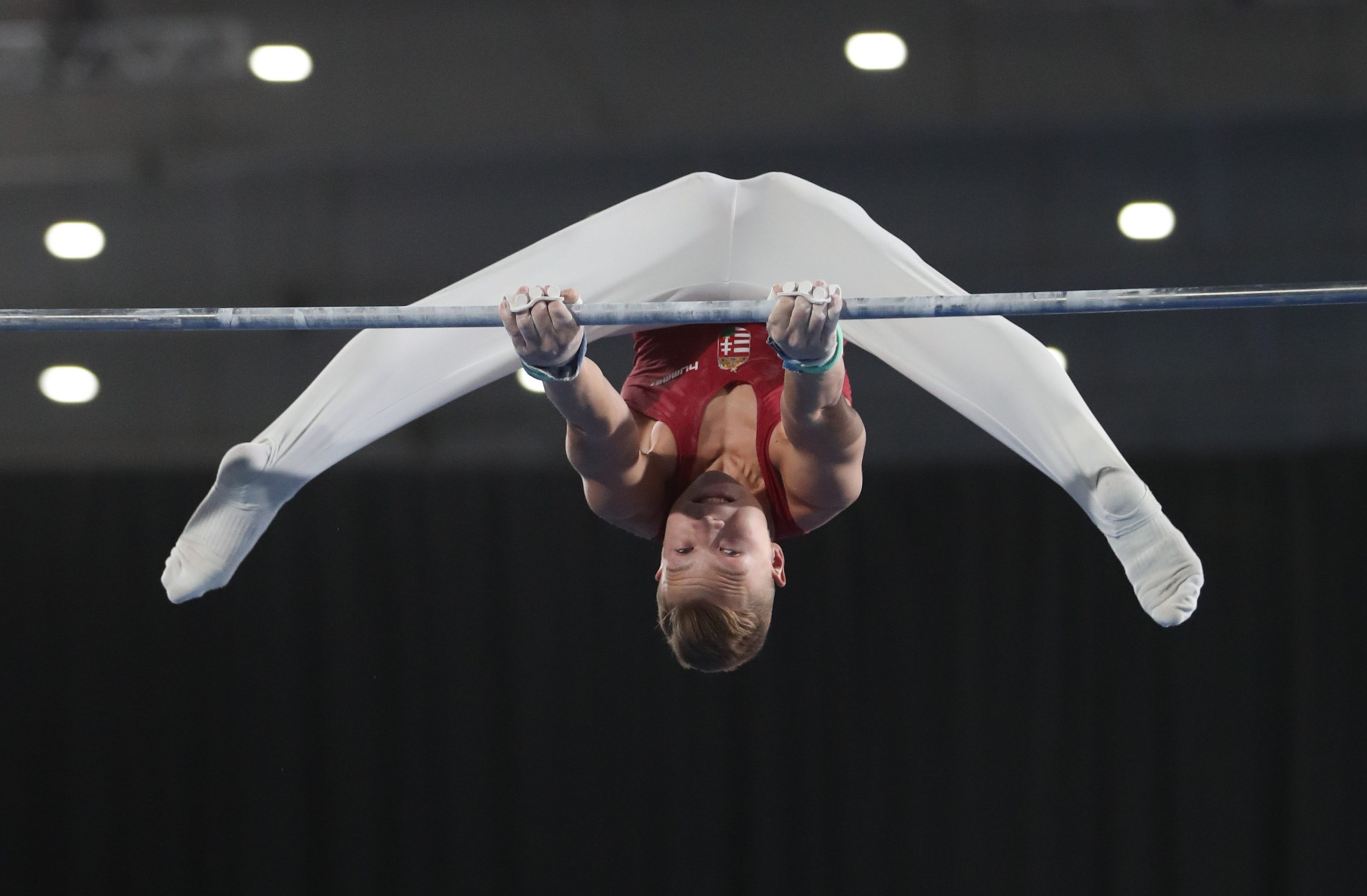
Krisztián Balázs

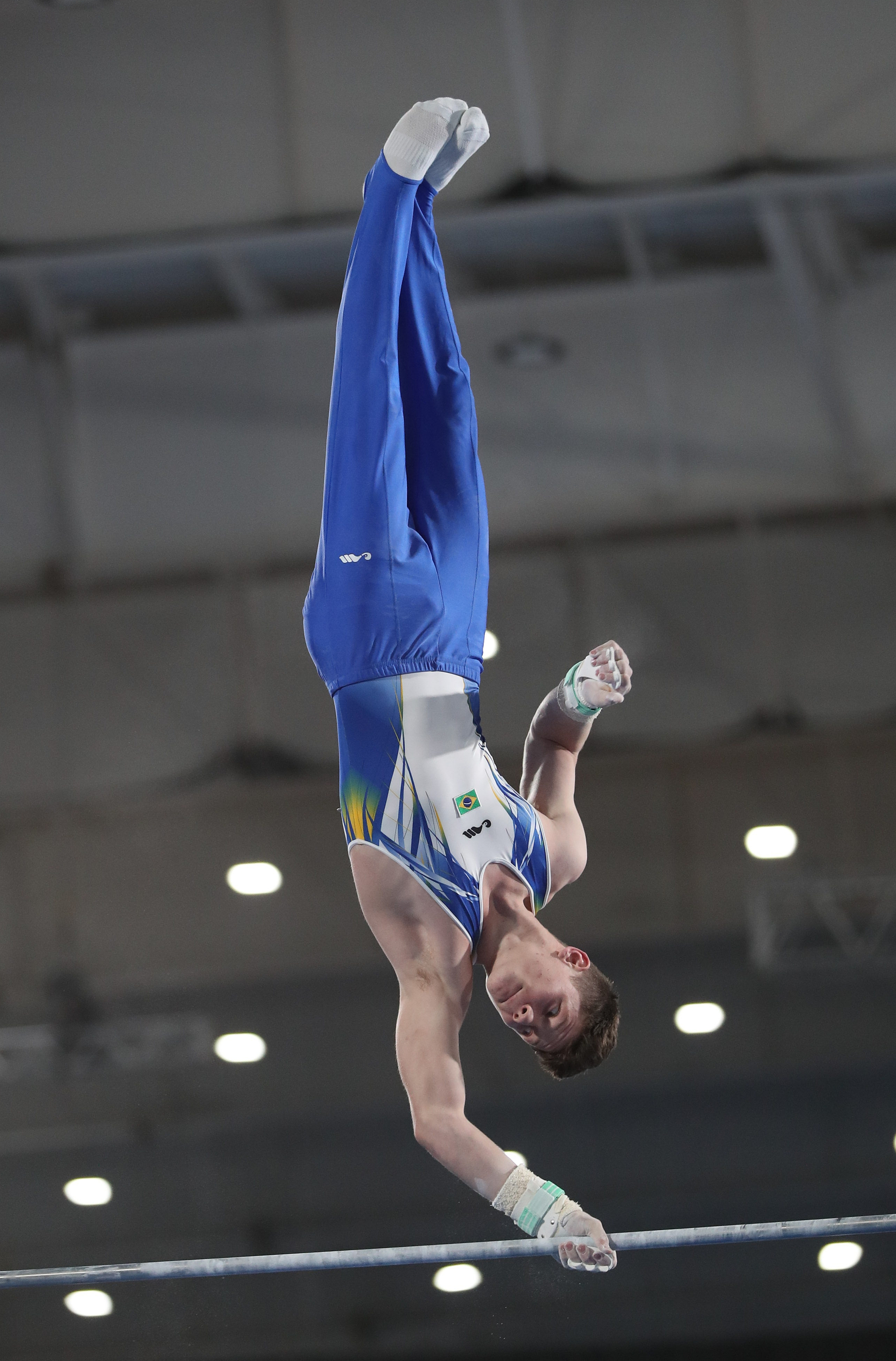
Diogo Soares
