= Gymnastics at the 2018 Summer Youth Olympics – Boys' artistic individual all-around =

Boys' artistic individual all-around at the III Summer Youth Olympic Games
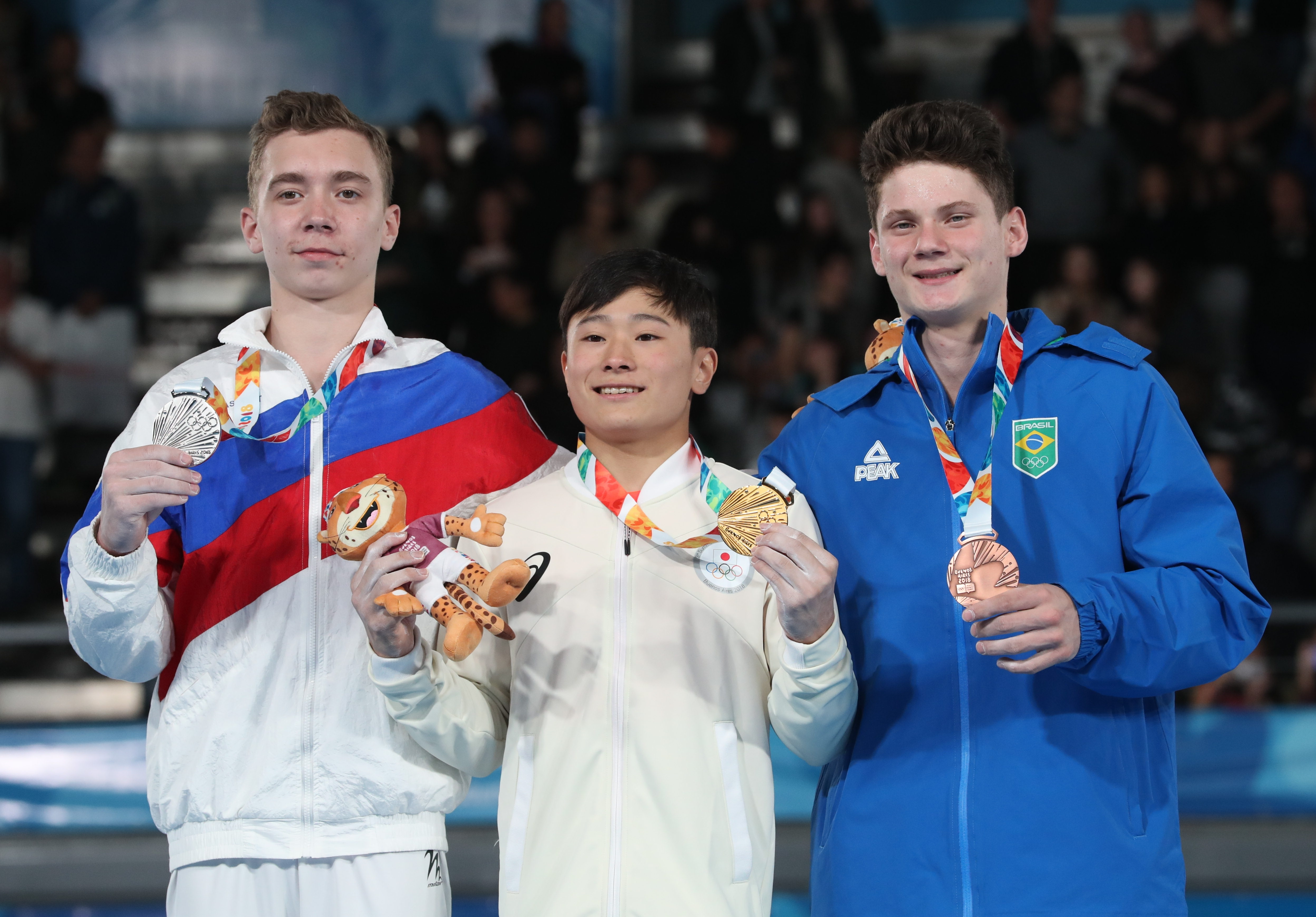
- Victory ceremony
- Venue: America Pavilion
- Date: 11 October
- Competitors: 18 from 18 nations
- Winning total: 82.298

Medalists
1st place, gold medalist(s)		Takeru Kitazono	Japan
2nd place, silver medalist(s)		Sergei Naidin	Russia
3rd place, bronze medalist(s)		Diogo Soares	Brazil

The boys' artistic individual all-around competition at the 2018 Summer Youth Olympics was held at the America Pavilion on 11 October.

== Qualification ==
Eighteen gymnasts qualified into the final.

== Final ==
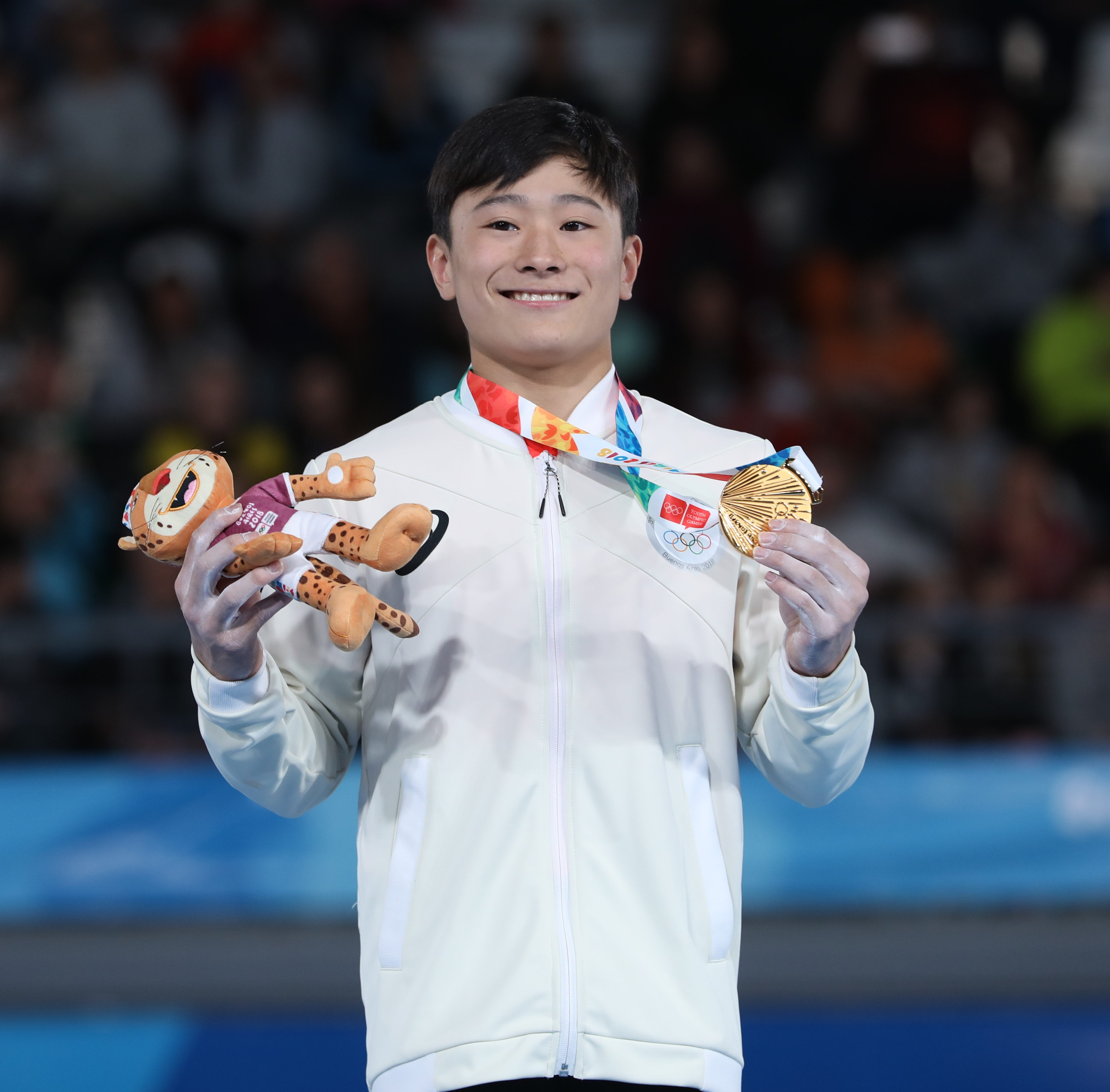
Takeru Kitazono (Youth Olympic Games Champion)

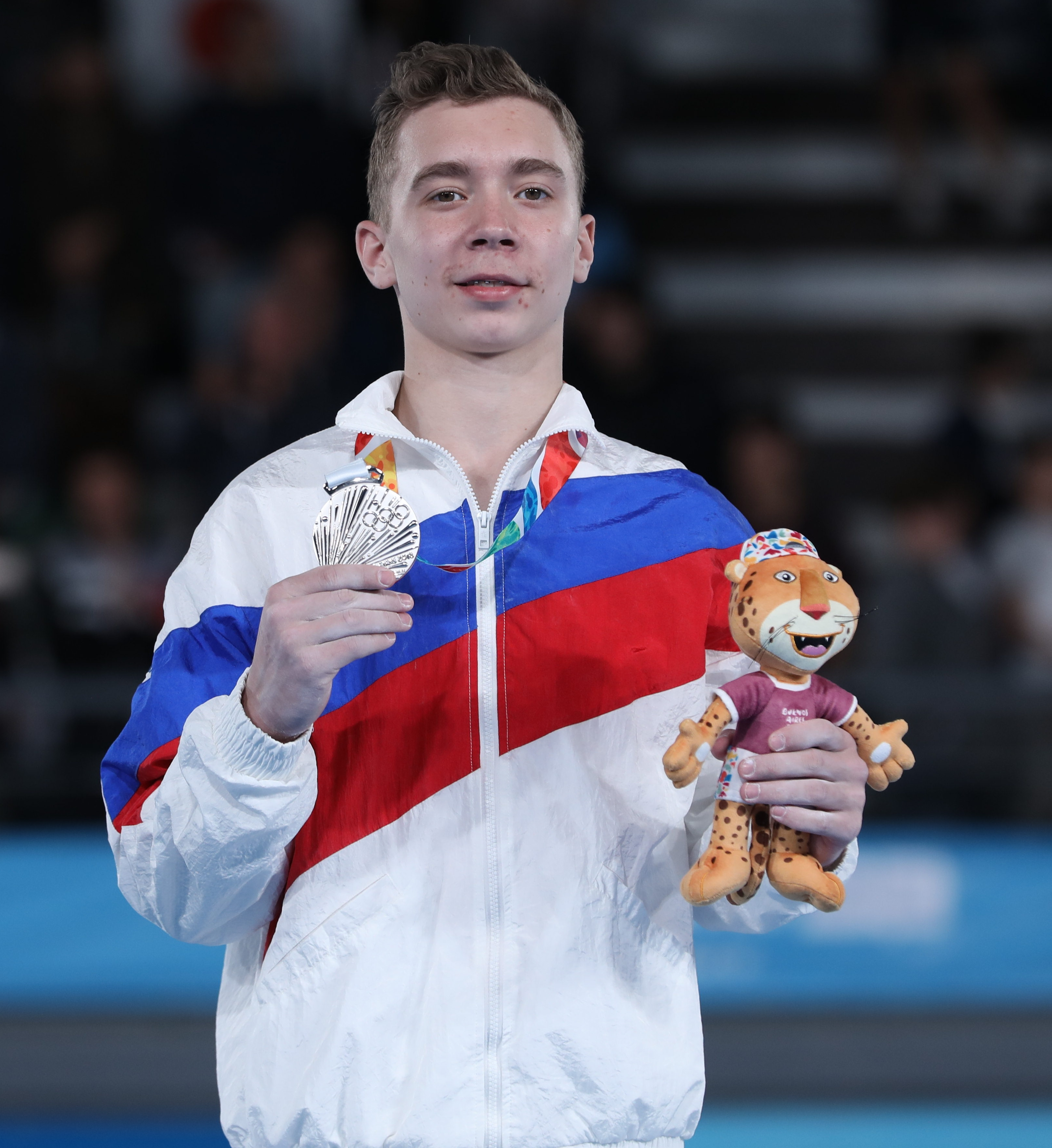
Sergei Naidin (Silver medalist)

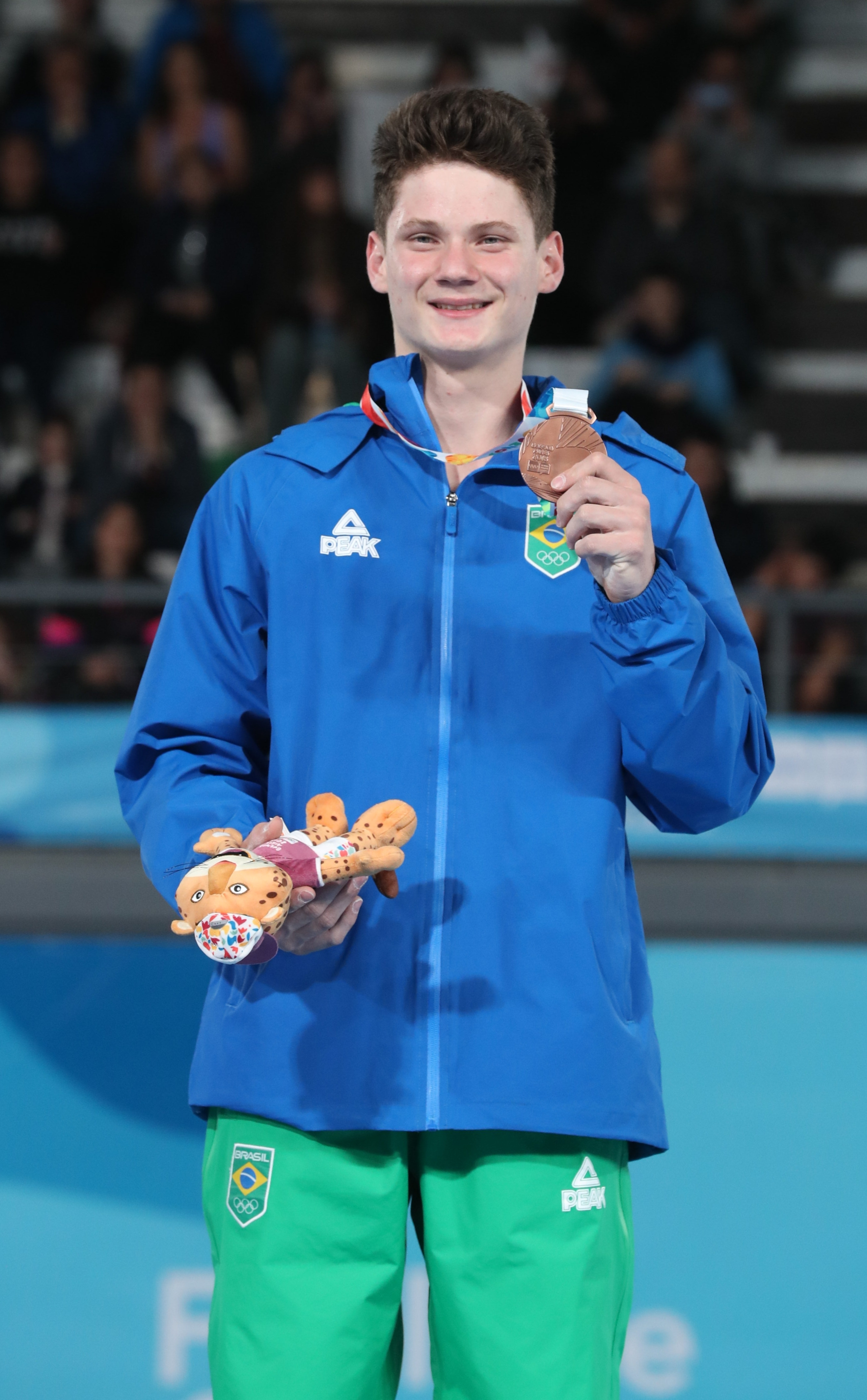
Diogo Soares (Bronze medalist)

Rank	Gymnast	Floor (gymnastics)	Pommel horse	Rings (gymnastics)	Vault (gymnastics)	Parallel bars	Horizontal bar	Total
1st place, gold medalist(s)	Takeru Kitazono (JPN)	13.833	13.966	13.466	14.233	13.000	13.800	82.298
2nd place, silver medalist(s)	Sergei Naidin (RUS)	13.500	13.500	12.766	14.066	13.666	13.000	80.498
3rd place, bronze medalist(s)	Diogo Soares (BRA)	13.200	12.600	13.233	14.300	13.566	13.366	80.265
4	Brandon Briones (USA)	13.666	12.700	13.033	14.333	13.266	13.133	80.131
5	Adam Tobin (GBR)	13.233	12.900	12.933	14.366	13.141	13.000	79.573
6	Nazar Chepurnyi (UKR)	13.666	12.900	13.100	13.833	13.666	12.166	79.331
7	Yin Dehang (CHN)	11.900	14.066	13.366	13.600	13.766	12.466	79.164
8	Lay Giannini (ITA)	13.533	12.266	12.733	14.200	13.200	12.866	78.798
9	Félix Dolci (CAN)	11.933	12.400	13.433	13.933	12.900	12.983	77.582
10	Ward Claeys (BEL)	12.633	12.866	12.566	12.933	13.033	12.733	76.764
11	Oļegs Ivanovs (LAT)	13.066	11.500	12.600	13.900	12.900	12.733	76.699
12	Daniel Schwed (GER)	13.266	11.733	12.766	13.366	12.458	12.300	75.889
13	Reza Bohloulzade Hajlari (IRI)	12.566	13.133	11.866	12.766	12.133	12.233	74.397
14	Sam Dick (NZL)	12.766	11.633	12.433	14.100	11.733	11.666	74.331
15	Bora Tarhan (TUR)	11.233	11.933	12.566	13.933	11.566	12.000	73.231
16	Krisztián Balázs (HUN)	12.333	12.733	12.733	11.400	10.475	13.233	72.907
17	Marcus Stenberg (SWE)	12.233	11.266	12.133	12.900	10.033	12.033	70.598
18	Jacob Karlsen (NOR)	12.333	6.100	12.500	13.933	12.266	12.200	69.332

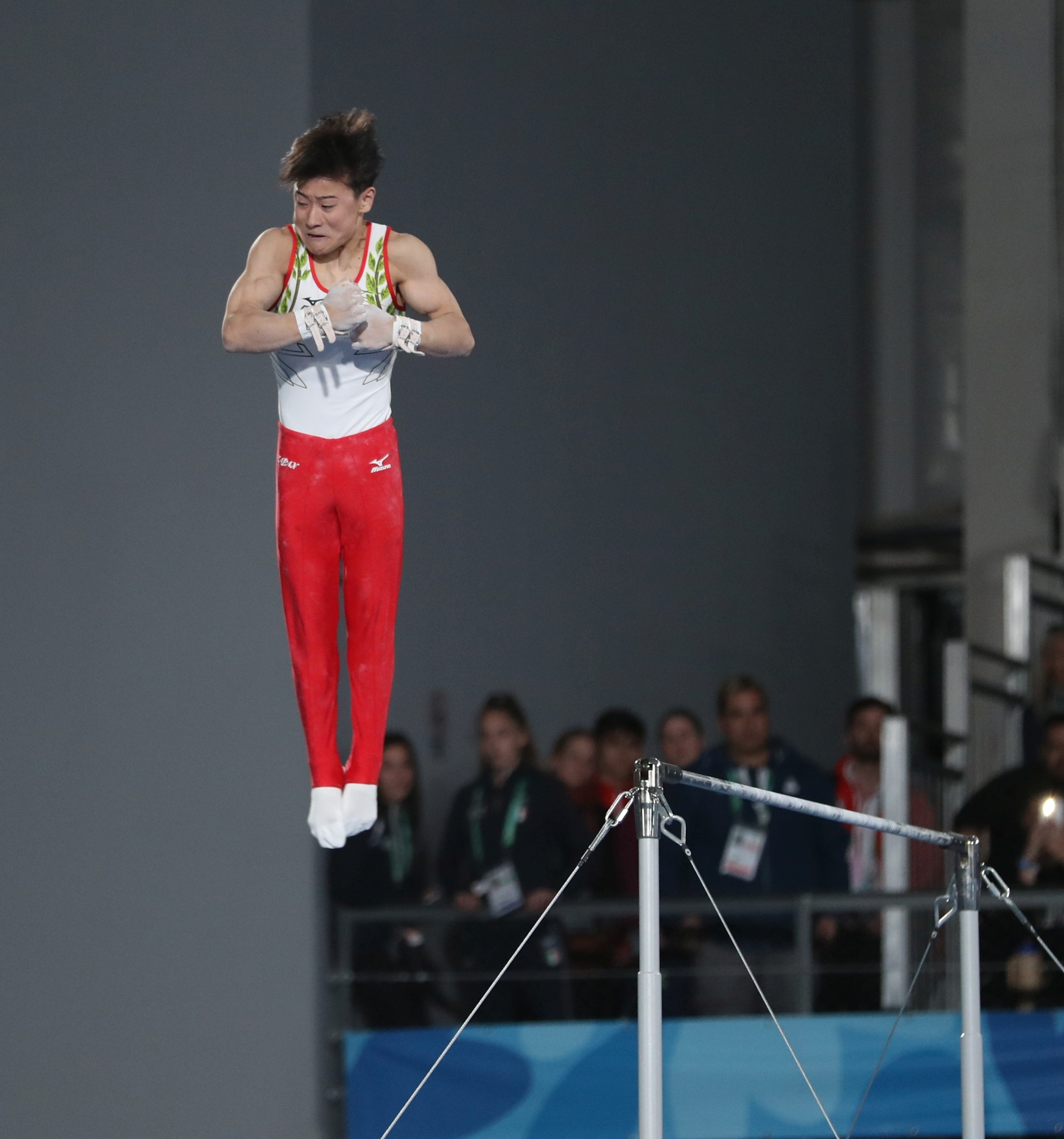
Takeru Kitazono on horizontal bar

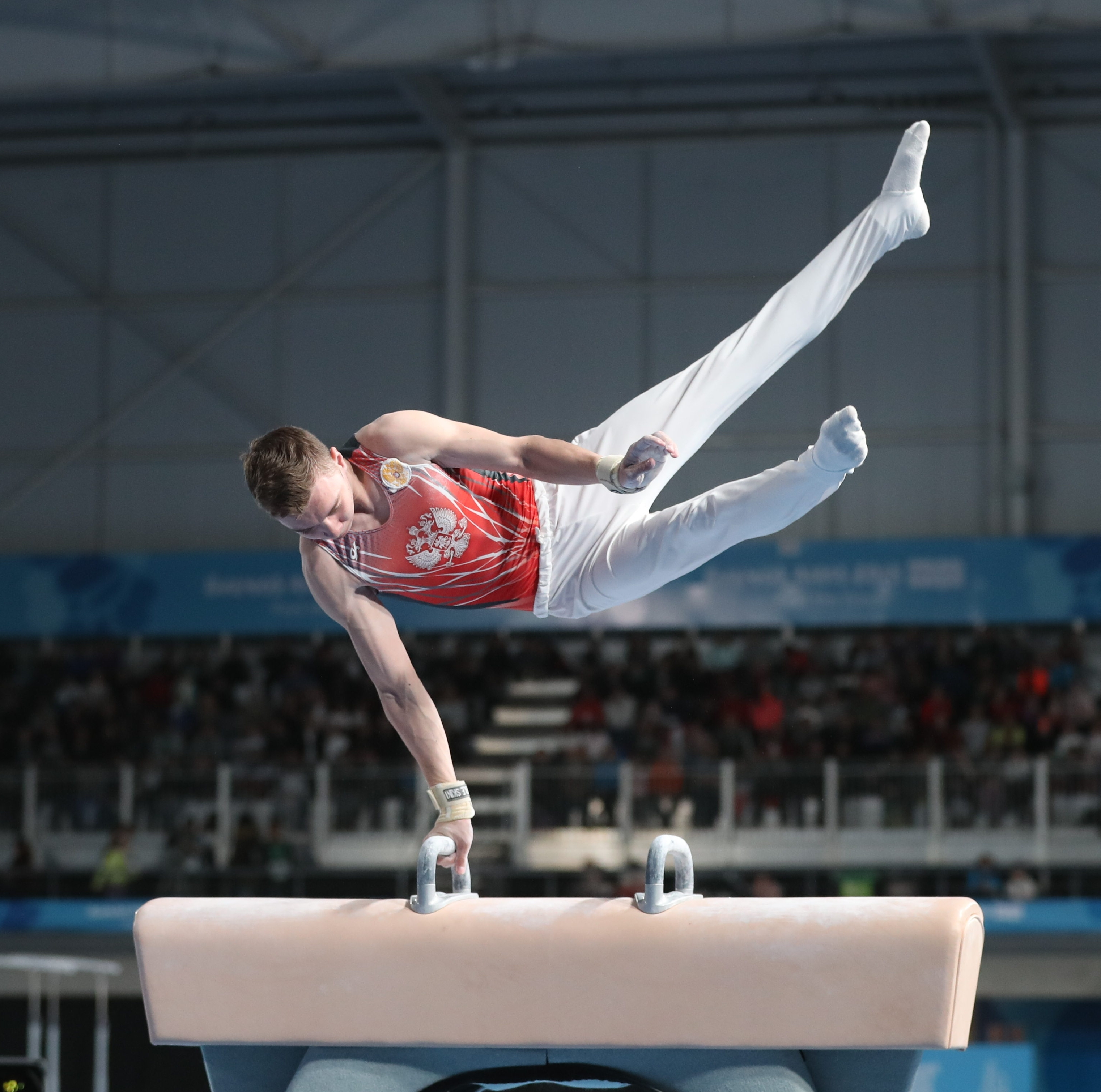
Sergei Naidin on pommel horse

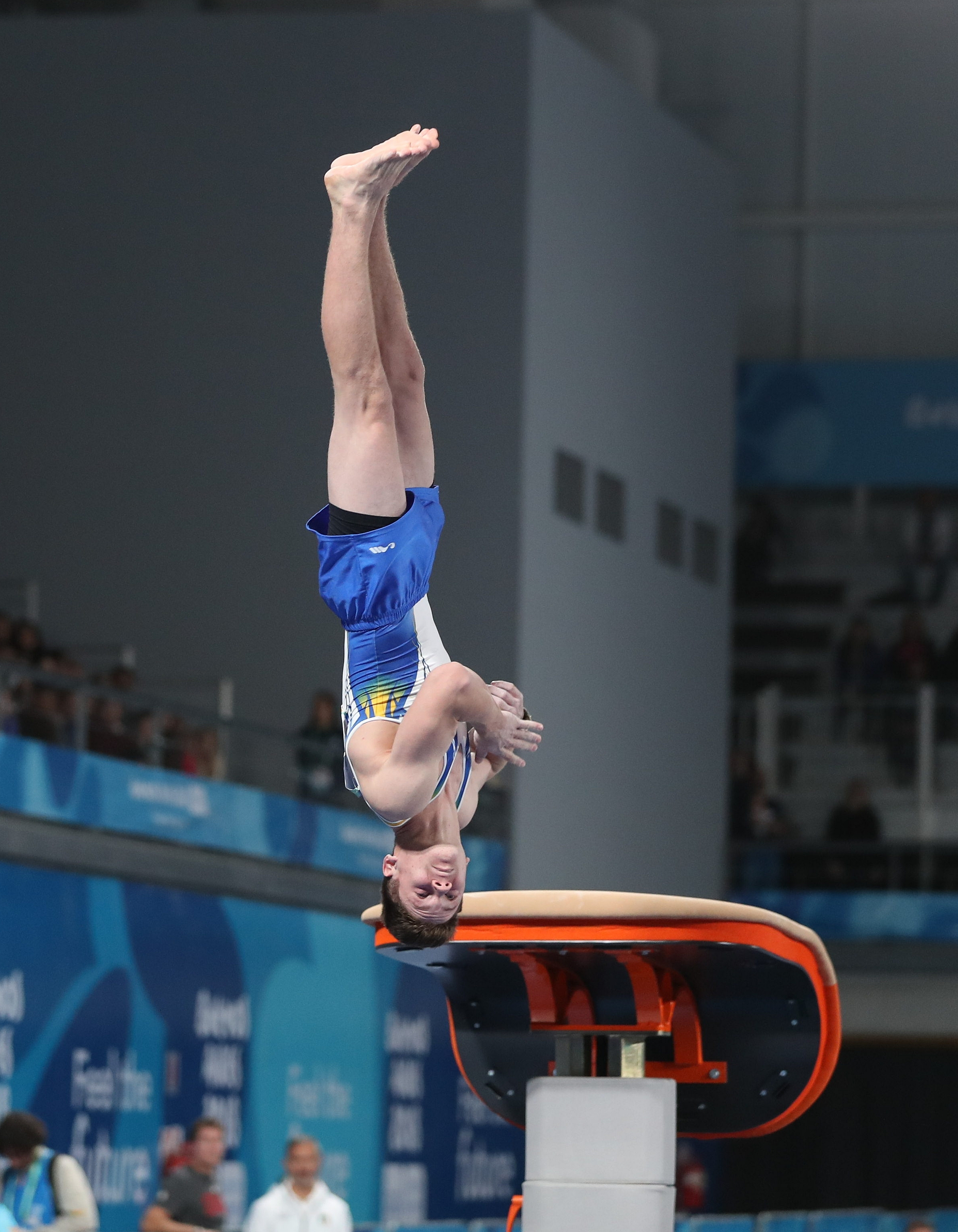
Diogo Soares on vault
