= Gymnastics at the 2018 Summer Youth Olympics – Boys' vault =

Boys' vault at the III Summer Youth Olympic Games
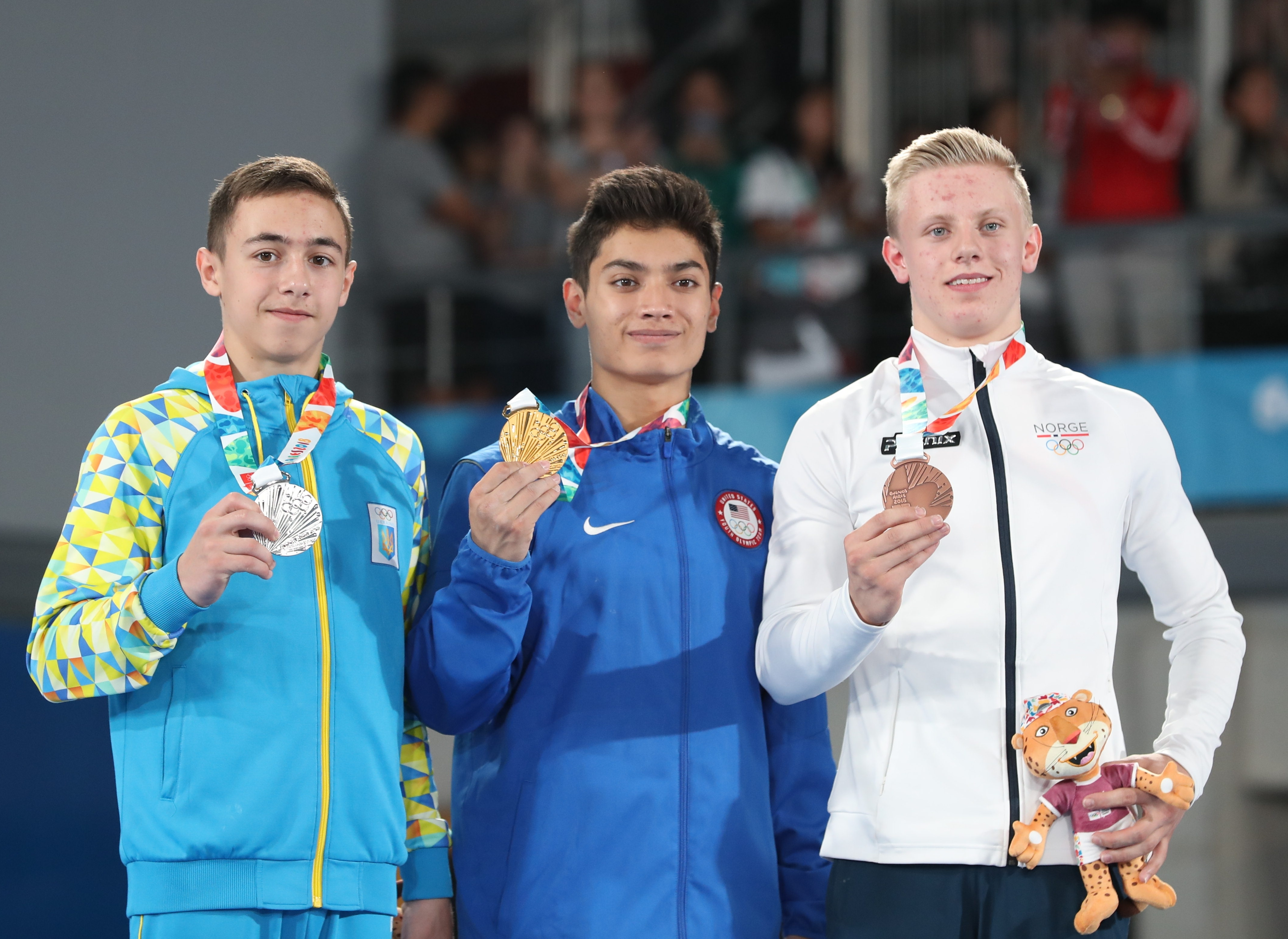
- Venue: America Pavilion
- Date: 14 October
- Competitors: 7 from 7 nations
- Winning score: 14.099

Medalists
| 1st place, gold medalist(s) | | Brandon Briones | United States |
| 2nd place, silver medalist(s) | | Nazar Chepurnyi | Ukraine |
| 3rd place, bronze medalist(s) | | Jacob Karlsen | Norway |

The boys' vault competition at the 2018 Summer Youth Olympics was held at the America Pavilion on 14 October.

== Qualification ==
| Rank | Gymnast | D Score | E Score | Pen. | Score 1 | D Score | E Score | Pen. | Score 2 | Total | Notes |
| Rank | Gymnast | Vault 1 | | | | Vault 2 | | | | Total | Notes |
|---|---|---|---|---|---|---|---|---|---|---|---|
| 1 | Brandon Briones (USA) | 5.200 | 8.966 | | 14.166 | 4.800 | 9.100 | | 13.900 | 14.033 | Q |
| 2 | Félix Dolci (CAN) | 5.200 | 9.100 | -0.1 | 14.200 | 5.200 | 8.500 | | 13.700 | 13.950 | Q |
| 3 | Gabriel Burtănete (ROU) | 5.200 | 9.233 | | 14.433 | 5.200 | 7.833 | | 13.033 | 13.733 | Q |
| 4 | Sam Dick (NZL) | 5.200 | 8.966 | | 14.166 | 4.000 | 9.266 | | 13.266 | 13.716 | Q |
| 5 | Diogo Soares (BRA) | 4.800 | 9.266 | | 14.066 | 4.000 | 9.300 | | 13.300 | 13.683 | Q |
| 6 | Jacob Karlsen (NOR) | 4.800 | 9.458 | | 14.258 | 4.000 | 9.100 | | 13.100 | 13.679 | Q |
| 7 | Fernando Espíndola (ARG) | 4.800 | 9.000 | | 13.800 | 4.000 | 9.333 | | 13.333 | 13.566 | Q |
| 8 | Nazar Chepurnyi (UKR) | 5.200 | 7.900 | -0.1 | 13.000 | 4.800 | 9.300 | | 14.100 | 13.550 | Q |
| 9 | Yeh Cheng (TPE) | 5.200 | 8.866 | | 14.066 | 4.000 | 8.883 | | 12.883 | 13.474 | R1 |
| 10 | Martin Guðmundsson (ISL) | 4.800 | 9.033 | -0.1 | 13.733 | 4.000 | 9.166 | | 13.166 | 13.449 | R2 |
| 11 | Bora Tarhan (TUR) | 4.800 | 8.933 | -0.1 | 13.633 | 5.200 | 7.566 | | 12.766 | 13.199 | R3 |

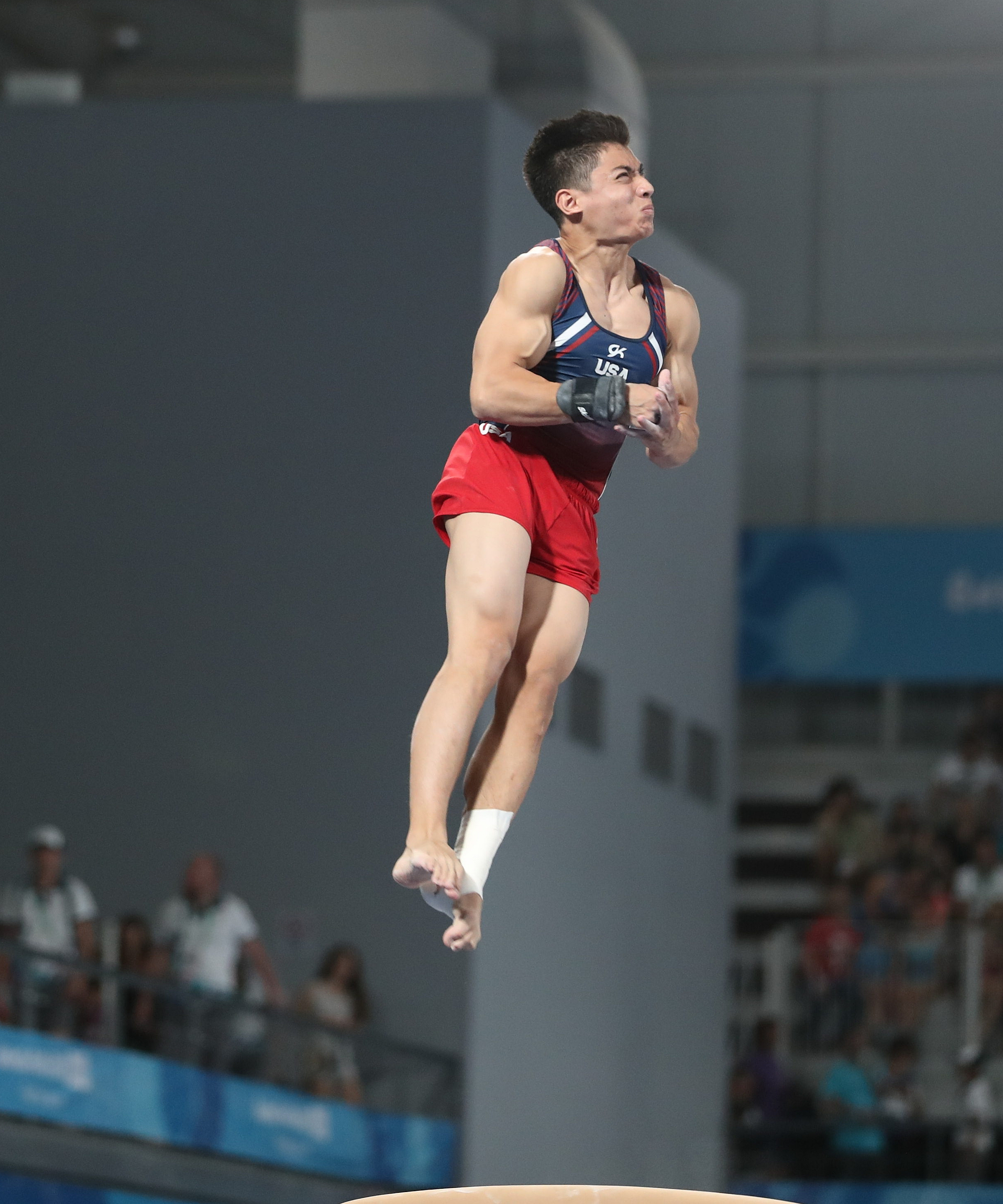
Brandon Briones

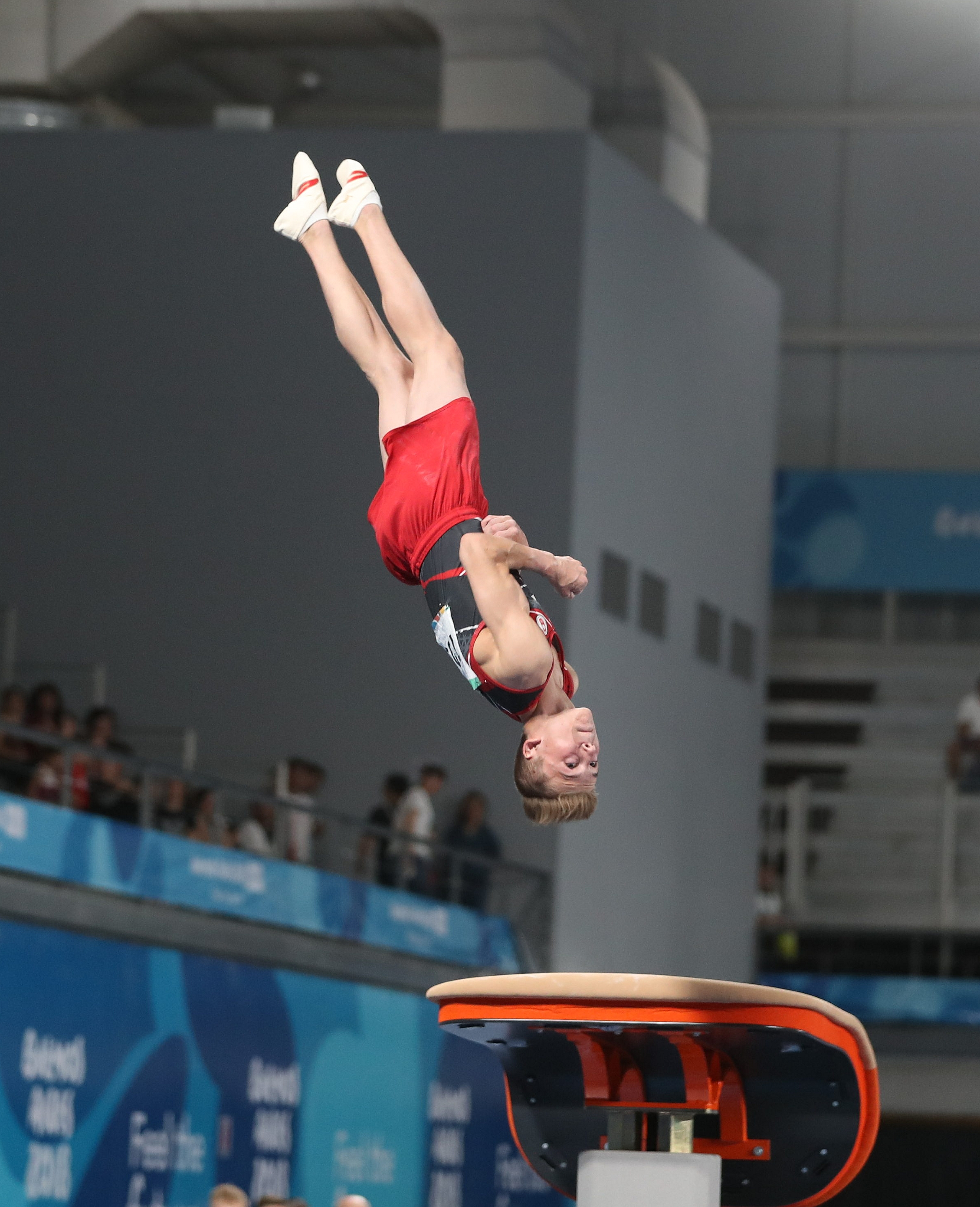
Félix Dolci

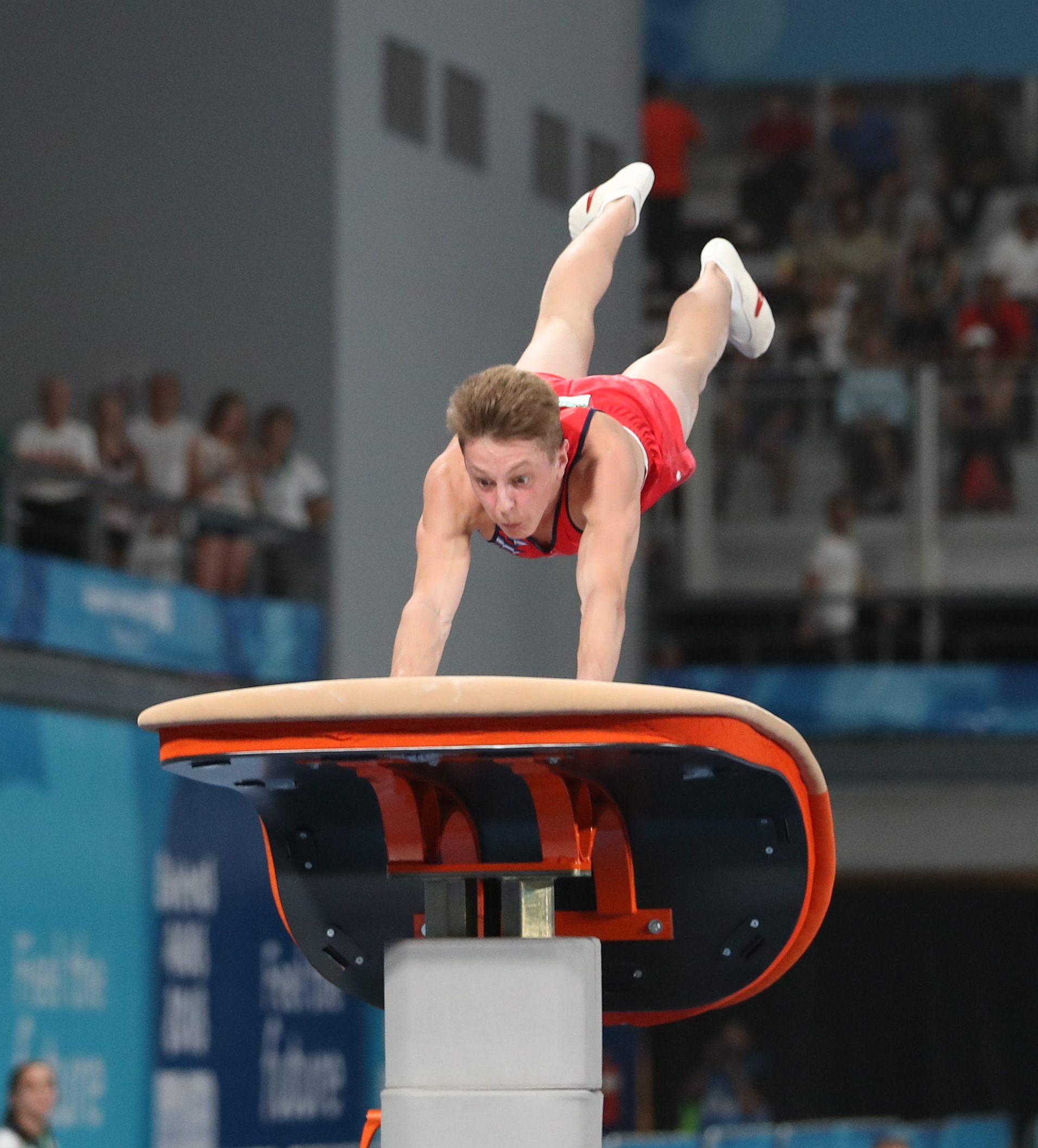
Gabriel Burtănete

== Final ==
| Rank | Gymnast | D Score | E Score | Pen. | Score 1 | D Score | E Score | Pen. | Score 2 | Total |
| Rank | Gymnast | Vault 1 | | | | Vault 2 | | | | Total |
|---|---|---|---|---|---|---|---|---|---|---|
| 1st place, gold medalist(s) | Brandon Briones (USA) | 5.200 | 9.266 | | 14.466 | 4.800 | 8.933 | | 13.733 | 14.099 |
| 2nd place, silver medalist(s) | Nazar Chepurnyi (UKR) | 5.200 | 8.866 | -0.1 | 13.966 | 4.800 | 9.300 | -0.1 | 14.000 | 13.983 |
| 3rd place, bronze medalist(s) | Jacob Karlsen (NOR) | 4.800 | 9.400 | | 14.200 | 4.000 | 9.566 | | 13.566 | 13.883 |
| 4 | Sam Dick (NZL) | 5.200 | 9.000 | -0.1 | 14.100 | 4.000 | 9.300 | | 13.300 | 13.700 |
| 5 | Gabriel Burtănete (ROU) | 5.200 | 9.266 | | 14.466 | 5.200 | 8.000 | -0.3 | 12.900 | 13.683 |
| 6 | Diogo Soares (BRA) | 4.800 | 9.300 | -0.1 | 14.000 | 4.000 | 9.208 | | 13.208 | 13.604 |
| 7 | Félix Dolci (CAN) | 5.200 | 9.000 | -0.1 | 14.100 | 5.200 | 8.091 | -0.3 | 12.991 | 13.545 |
| | Fernando Espíndola (ARG) | | | | | | | | | DNS |

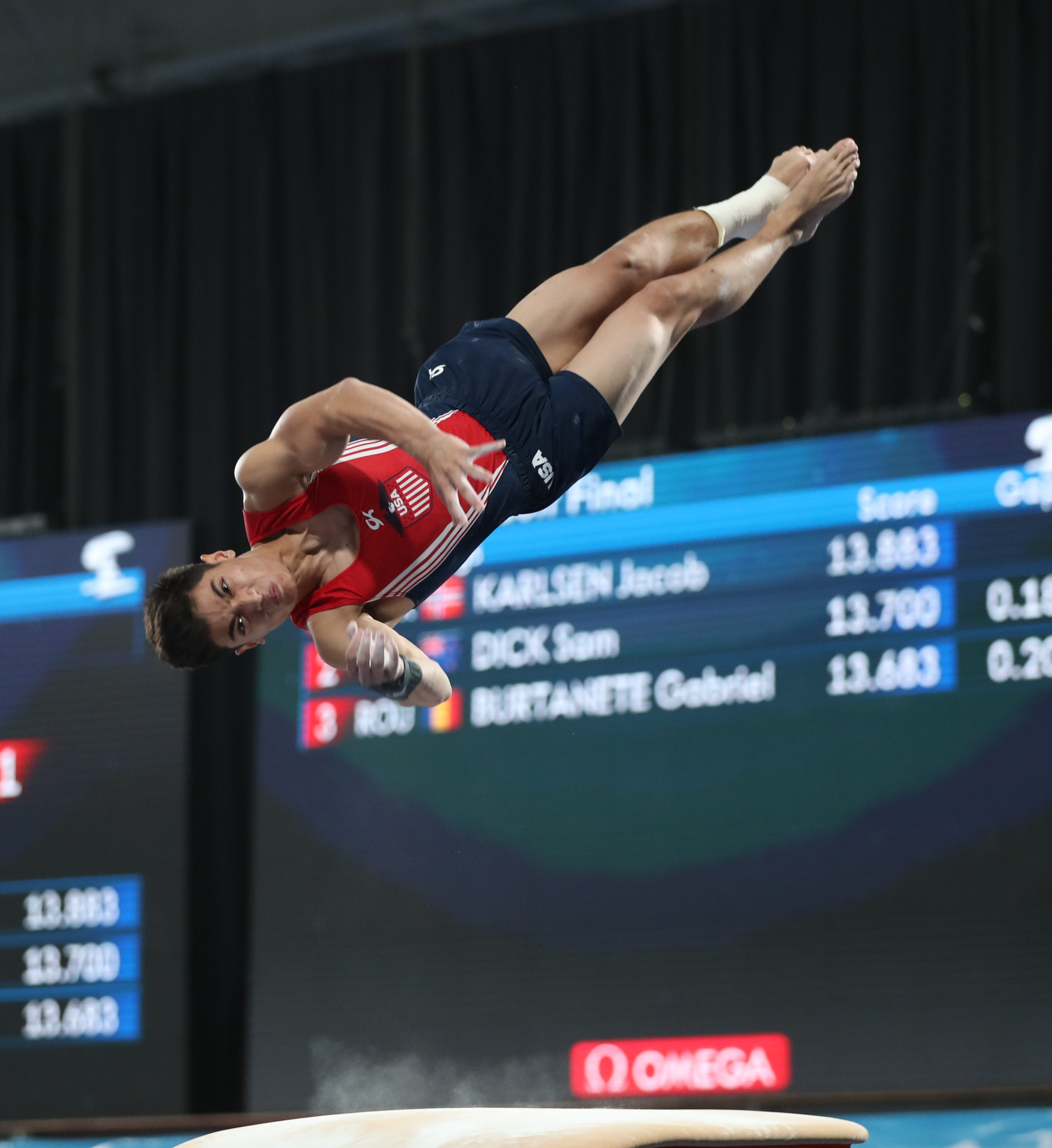
Brandon Briones

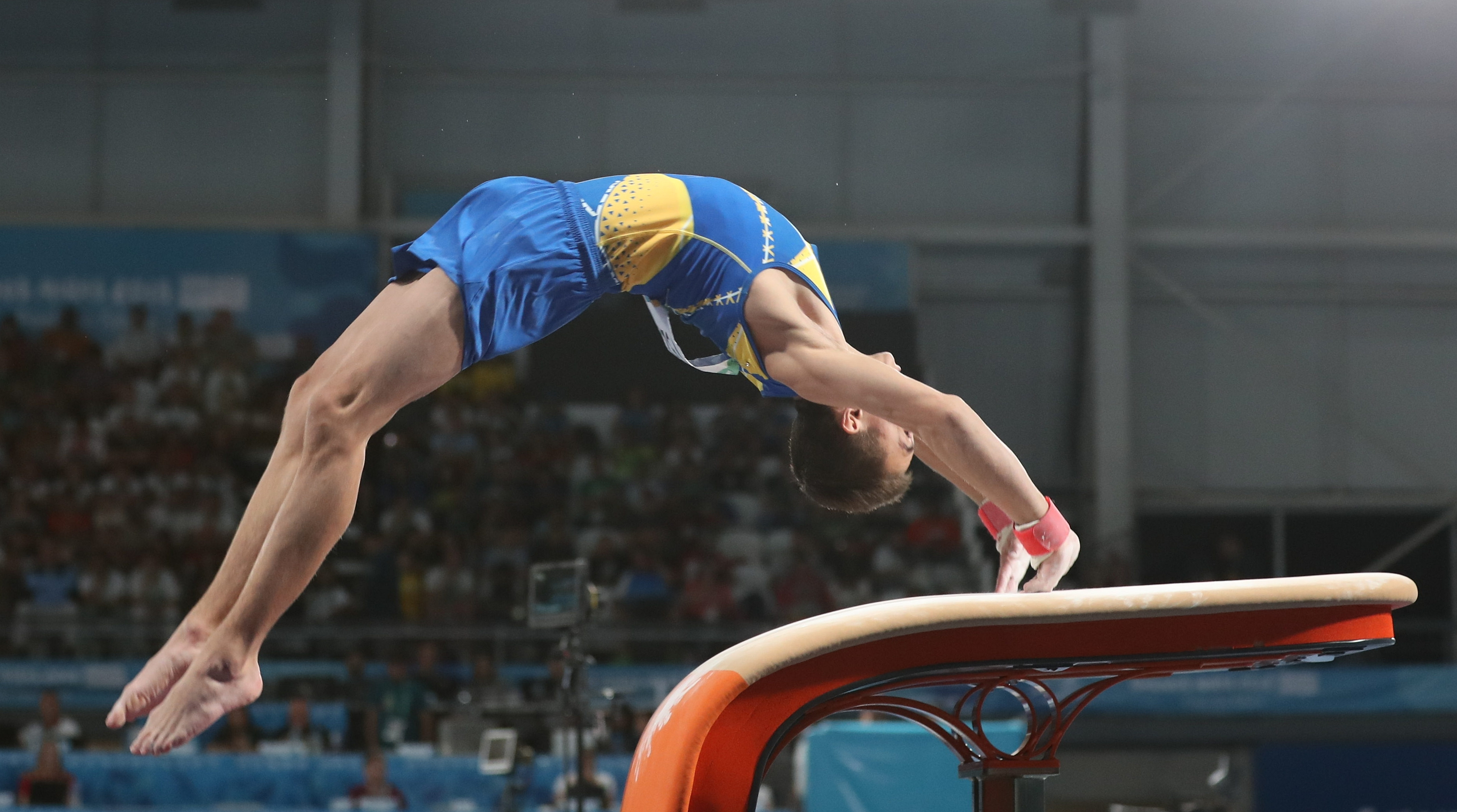
Nazar Chepurnyi

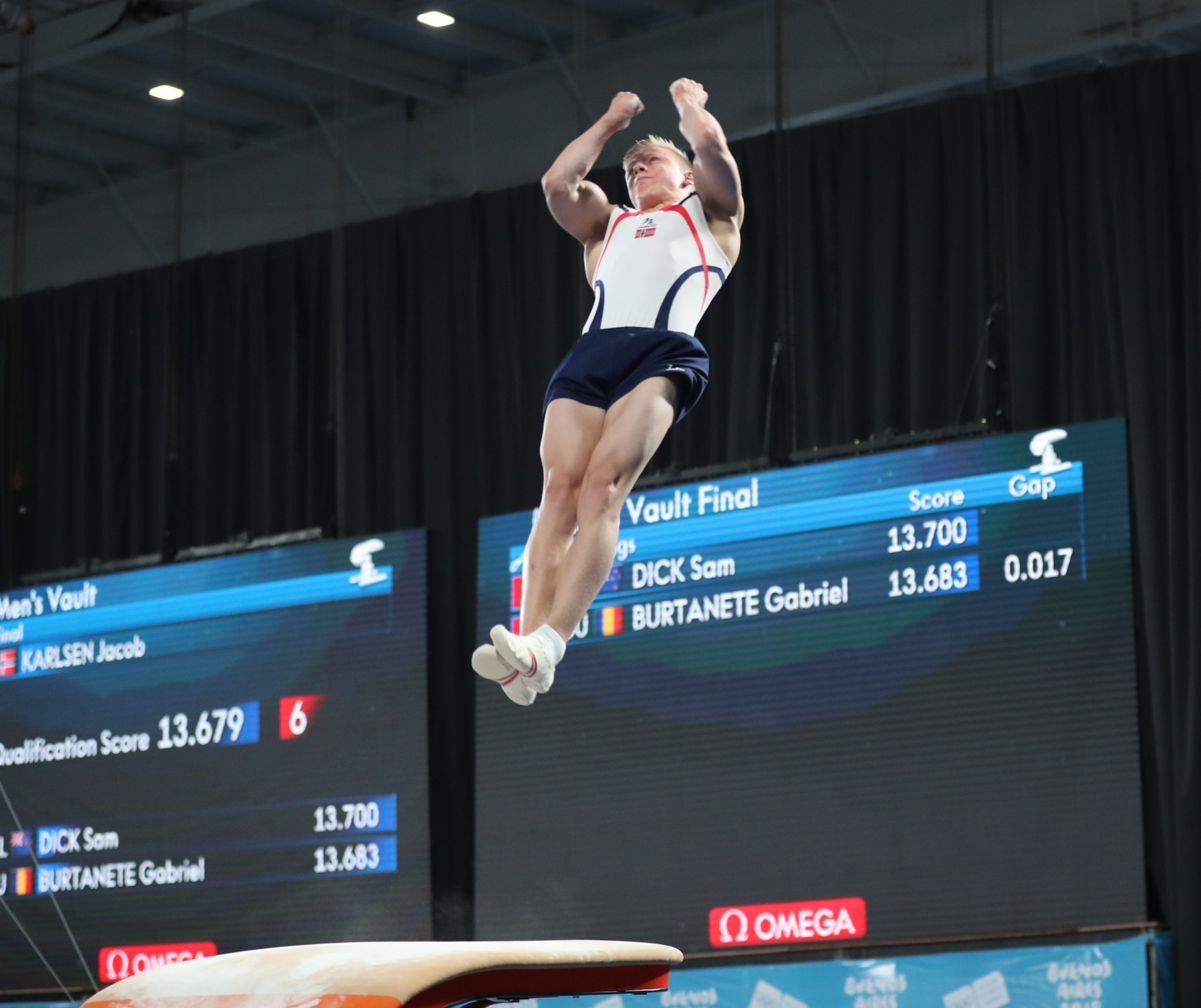
Jacob Karlsen
