= Gabriel Burtănete =

Romanian artistic gymnast

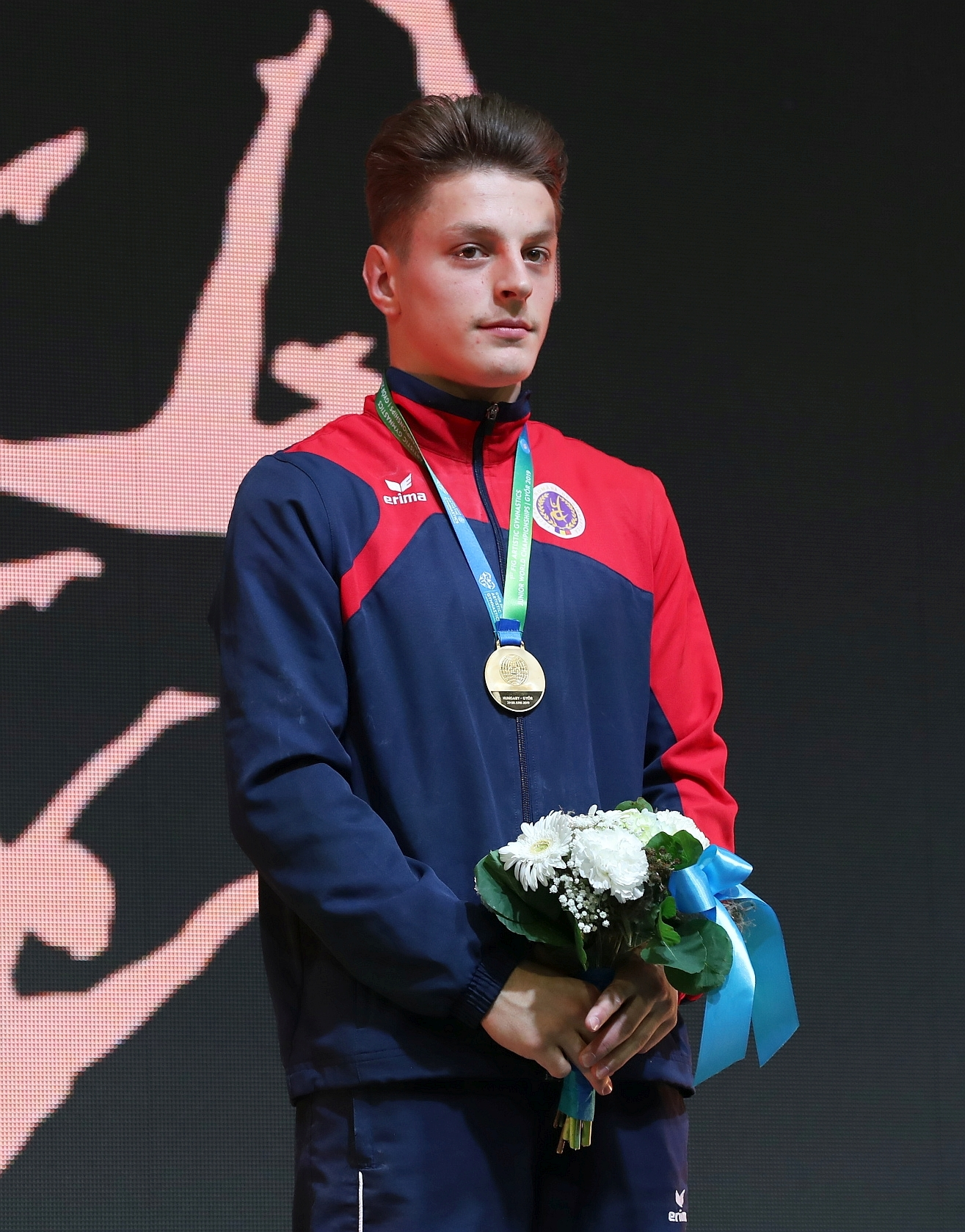
- Burtănete at the 2019 Junior World Championships

Personal information
- Nickname: Gabi
- Born: 19 February 2002 (age 24) Buzău, Romania

Gymnastics career
- Discipline: Men's artistic gymnastics
- Country represented: Romania
- Club: CSA Steaua Bucuresti
Medal record
Men's artistic gymnastics
Representing Romania
Junior World Championships
Gold medal – first place	2019 Győr	Vault
Junior European Championships
Gold medal – first place	2020 Mersin	Vault
FIG World Cup
Event / 1st / 2nd / 3rd; World Challenge Cup / 2 / 0 / 1

Gabriel Burtănete (born 19 February 2002) is a Romanian artistic gymnast. He is the 2019 Junior World and 2020 Junior European vault champion. He represented Romania at the 2018 Summer Youth Olympics.

== Early life ==
Burtănete was born on 19 February 2002, in Buzău. His twin brother, Robert, is also an artistic gymnast who competes for the Romanian national team. They competed at the 2022 European Championships together.

== Gymnastics career ==
=== Junior ===
Burtănete helped the Romanian team finish 11th at the 2018 Junior European Championships. He then competed at the 2018 Summer Youth Olympics and was the first reserve for the all-around final. He did advance into the vault final and finished fifth.

In 2019, he won the gold medal in the vault at the Junior World Championships held in Győr, Hungary. Then at the 2019 European Youth Olympic Festival, he finished sixth with the Romanian team and fifth in the all-around. He won the bronze medal in the vault final.

In 2020, Burtănete earned the gold medal in the vault final of the Junior European Artistic Gymnastics Championships in Mersin, Turkey. Additionally, he helped Romania finish fourth in the team event, and he placed fourth in the still rings final.

=== Senior ===
Burtănete won a bronze medal on the vault at the 2021 Mersin World Challenge Cup, behind William Émard and Milad Karimi. He advanced to the vault final at the 2022 European Championships and finished fifth. He won the vault titles at the 2022 Varna and Mersin World Challenge Cups. At the 2022 World Championships, he advanced to the all-around final and finished 23rd. Then in the vault final, he finished fourth and was 0.200 points away from the bronze medal.

At the 2023 European Championships, Burtănete finished 23rd in the all-around and fourth in the vault final.
