= Jacob Karlsen =

Norwegian artistic gymnast

Jacob Gudim Karlsen
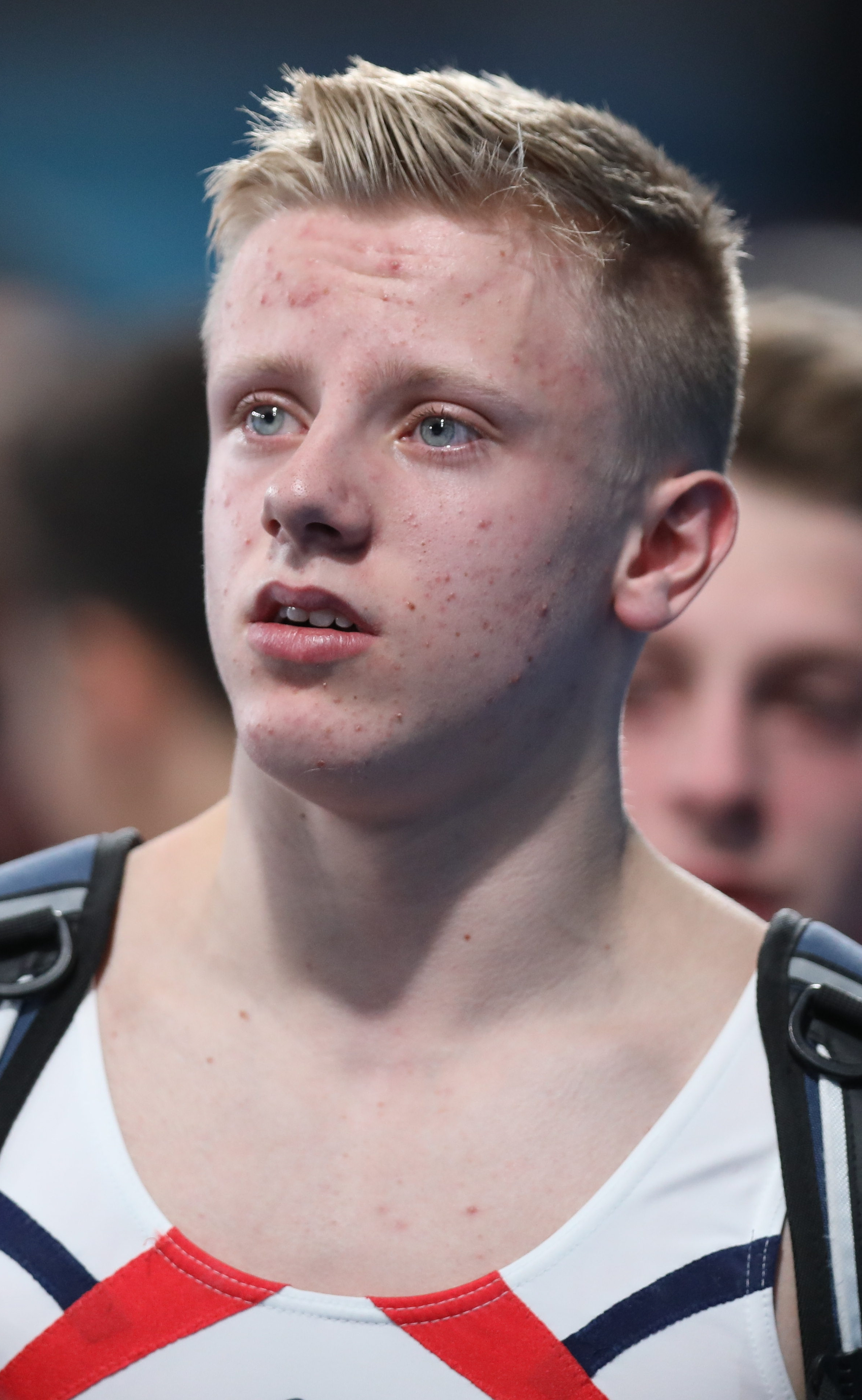
- Jacob Gudim Karlsen in 2018

Personal information
- Born: 24 July 2001 (age 25) Lørenskog, Norway
- Height: 1.70 m (5 ft 7 in)

Gymnastics career
- Discipline: Men's artistic gymnastics
- Country represented: Norway
- Club: Oslo Turnforening
- Retired: October 12, 2025
Medal record
Representing Norway
Men's artistic gymnastics
Summer Youth Olympics
Bronze medal – third place	2018 Buenos Aires	Vault

Jacob Gudim Karlsen (born 24 July 2001, Lørenskog, Norway) is a Norwegian former artistic gymnast. In 2018, he won the bronze medal in the vault event at the 2018 Summer Youth Olympics held in Buenos Aires, Argentina.

== Sports career ==
2017

Karlsen got bronze in floor and pommel horse during the Junior National Championships in gymnastics in 2017, and he came fourth in pommel horse and fifth in rings. Overall, he came fourth.

He participated in the 2017 European Youth Summer Olympic Festival. In the all-around he came in 41st place in the qualification with 72.650 points, and did not reach the final. He came in 31st place in free standing, 39th place in pommel horse, 10th place in rings, 47th place in bars and 51st place in pommel horse.His total score was a new personal best.

2018

In the 2018 European Men's Artistic Gymnastics Championships, he came in 28th place in the all-around in the junior class, with 74.531 points. His best individual placing was rings, where he came 21st.He participated in the 2018 Nordic Gymnastics Championships, and came fourth overall in the junior class, with 74.032 points. Individually he won rings and bar, and Norway got silver in the team competition, where Karlsen participated together with Fredrik Bjørnevik Aas, Thodor Gadderud, Didrik Gundersen and Magnus Nygaard-Damm.

In the 2018 Summer Youth Olympics, he won bronze in vault, where he scored 14.200 and 13.566 on his two vaults, which gave a total of 13.883. In the all-around he came in 18th place with 69.332 points.
