= Athletics at the 2018 Summer Youth Olympics =

Athletics at the III Summer Youth Olympic Games
- Venue: Parque Olímpico de la Juventud
- Dates: 11–16 October
- No. of events: 36 (18 boys, 18 girls)
- Competitors: 696 from 177 nations

Athletics at the 2018 Summer Youth Olympics was held from 11 to 16 October. The events took place at the Parque Olímpico de la Juventud in Buenos Aires, Argentina.

For the first time, every athletics' event featured 2 stages – 2 separate competitions, both of their results were added together to conclude final standings.

== Qualification ==
Each National Olympic Committee (NOC) could enter a maximum of 36 athletes, 18 per each gender and 1 per each event. In total, 680 (340 boys and 340 girls) athletes will compete at the Youth Olympics with continental qualification events deciding the majority of athletes. The distribution of quotas was decided based on the results from the 2015 World Youth Championships and 2017 World Youth Championships. As hosts, Argentina was given 4 quotas, 2 per each gender and universality places will be given to nations that did not qualify an athlete with a maximum of 1 boy or girl per nation. These quotas will be subtracted from that nation's continental quota in the relevant event. All athletes qualified in the 1500 m, 3000 m and 2000 m steeplechase will compete their Stage 2 event in the cross country run.

To be eligible to participate at the Youth Olympics athletes must have been born between 1 January 2001 and 31 December 2002.

=== Qualification timeline ===
Event	Location	Date
2015 World Youth Championships	(Colombia) Cali	15–19 July 2015
2017 World Youth Championships	(Kenya) Nairobi	12–16 July 2017
2018 Melanesian Championship	(Vanuatu) Port Vila	9–11 May 2018
2018 Asian Youth Olympic Qualifying Meet	(Thailand) Bangkok	4–5 July 2018
2018 European U18 Championship	(Hungary) Győr	5–8 July 2018
2018 African Youth Games	(Algeria) Algiers	19–28 July 2018

- The Americas Youth Olympic trials were scheduled to be held in Nicaragua but were cancelled due to civil unrest in the country. Rankings will determine who competes from the continent.

=== Quota distribution ===
Boys

Event	Africa	Americas	Asia	Europe	Oceania	Total
100m	5	12	8	6	1	32
200m	3	5	4	11	1	24
400m	5	8	5	5	1	24
800m	8	5	2	8	1	24
1500m	7	3	1	6	1	18
3000m	6	1	5	5	1	18
110m Hurdles	2	8	3	7	2	22
400m Hurdles	3	6	3	3	1	16
2000m Steeplechase	6	2	2	7	1	18
High Jump	1	5	4	5	1	16
Pole Vault	1	1	3	10	1	16
Long Jump	1	6	2	6	1	16
Triple Jump	2	6	4	3	1	16
Shot Put	2	4	2	7	1	16
Discus Throw	1	4	2	8	1	16
Hammer Throw	1	2	2	10	1	16
Javelin Throw	2	3	2	8	1	16
5000m Race Walk	1	7	3	4	1	16
Total	57	88	57	119	19	340

Girls

Event	Africa	Americas	Asia	Europe	Oceania	Total
100m	3	14	1	13	1	32
200m	1	7	4	11	1	24
400m	3	7	2	11	1	24
800m	5	3	1	14	1	24
1500m	7	2	3	5	1	18
3000m	8	2	3	4	1	18
100m Hurdles	1	8	2	10	1	22
400m Hurdles	1	5	2	7	1	16
2000m Steeplechase	3	3	2	9	1	18
High Jump	1	2	1	11	1	16
Pole Vault	1	3	1	10	1	16
Long Jump	1	5	1	8	1	16
Triple Jump	1	4	2	8	1	16
Shot Put	1	3	1	10	1	16
Discus Throw	2	4	1	8	1	16
Hammer Throw	1	3	1	10	1	16
Javelin Throw	1	5	2	7	1	16
5000m Race Walk	2	5	2	6	1	16
Total	43	85	32	162	18	340

== Schedule ==
The schedule was released by the Buenos Aires Youth Olympic Games Organizing Committee.

Q	Stage 1	H	Stage 1	F	Stage 2	C	Cross country run (Stage 2)

Event ↓ / Date →	Thu 11	Fri 12	Sat 13	Sun 14	Mon 15	Tue 16
Boys' 100 m		H			F	
Boys' 200 m			H			F
Boys' 400 m	H			F		
Boys' 800 m			H		F	
Boys' 1500 m		H			C	
Boys' 3000 m	H				C	
Boys' 110 m hurdles			H			F
Boys' 400 m hurdles			H			F
Boys' 2000 m steeplechase		H			C	
Boys' 5 km walk	H				F	
Boys' Long jump		Q			F	
Boys' Triple jump			Q			F
Boys' High jump	Q			F		
Boys' Pole vault			Q			F
Boys' Shot put		Q			F	
Boys' Discus throw	Q			F		
Boys' Javelin throw			Q			F
Boys' Hammer throw		Q			F	
Event ↓ / Date →	Thu 11	Fri 12	Sat 13	Sun 14	Mon 15	Tue 16
Girls' 100 m		H			F	
Girls' 200 m			H			F
Girls' 400 m	H			F		
Girls' 800 m	H			F		
Girls' 1500 m		H			C	
Girls' 3000 m	H				C	
Girls' 100 m hurdles	H			F		
Girls' 400 m hurdles			H			F
Girls' 2000 m steeplechase		H			C	
Girls' 5 km walk		H				F
Girls' Long jump	Q			F		
Girls' Triple jump			Q			F
Girls' High jump		Q			F	
Girls' Pole vault	Q			F		
Girls' Shot put		Q			F	
Girls' Discus throw	Q			F		
Girls' Javelin throw			Q			F
Girls' Hammer throw		Q			F	
Event ↓ / Date →	Thu 11	Fri 12	Sat 13	Sun 14	Mon 15	Tue 16

== Medal summary ==
=== Medal table ===
* Host nation (Argentina)

Rank	Nation	Gold	Silver	Bronze	Total
1	China	3	1	1	5
2	Kenya	3	1	0	4
3	Cuba	3	0	1	4
3	Ukraine	3	0	1	4
5	Ethiopia	2	2	4	8
6	Qatar	2	0	0	2
7	Australia	1	4	0	5
8	France	1	3	0	4
9	Nigeria	1	2	0	3
10	Japan	1	1	2	4
11	Ecuador	1	1	1	3
11	United States	1	1	1	3
13	Argentina*	1	1	0	2
13	Bulgaria	1	1	0	2
13	Germany	1	1	0	2
13	Mexico	1	1	0	2
17	Czech Republic	1	0	1	2
17	Finland	1	0	1	2
17	Greece	1	0	1	2
17	South Africa	1	0	1	2
17	Uganda	1	0	1	2
22	Belgium	1	0	0	1
22	Burundi	1	0	0	1
22	Colombia	1	0	0	1
22	Iceland	1	0	0	1
22	New Zealand	1	0	0	1
27	Russia	0	2	2	4
28	Algeria	0	2	0	2
28	Hungary	0	2	0	2
30	Belarus	0	1	1	2
30	India	0	1	1	2
30	Italy	0	1	1	2
30	Jamaica	0	1	1	2
30	Puerto Rico	0	1	1	2
30	Spain	0	1	1	2
30	Zambia	0	1	1	2
37	Egypt	0	1	0	1
37	Morocco	0	1	0	1
37	Saint Lucia	0	1	0	1
40	Turkey	0	0	3	3
41	Brazil	0	0	2	2
42	Austria	0	0	1	1
42	Eritrea	0	0	1	1
42	Hong Kong	0	0	1	1
42	Poland	0	0	1	1
42	Saudi Arabia	0	0	1	1
42	Sri Lanka	0	0	1	1
Totals (47 entries)		36	36	36	108

Source: IAAF

=== Boys' events ===
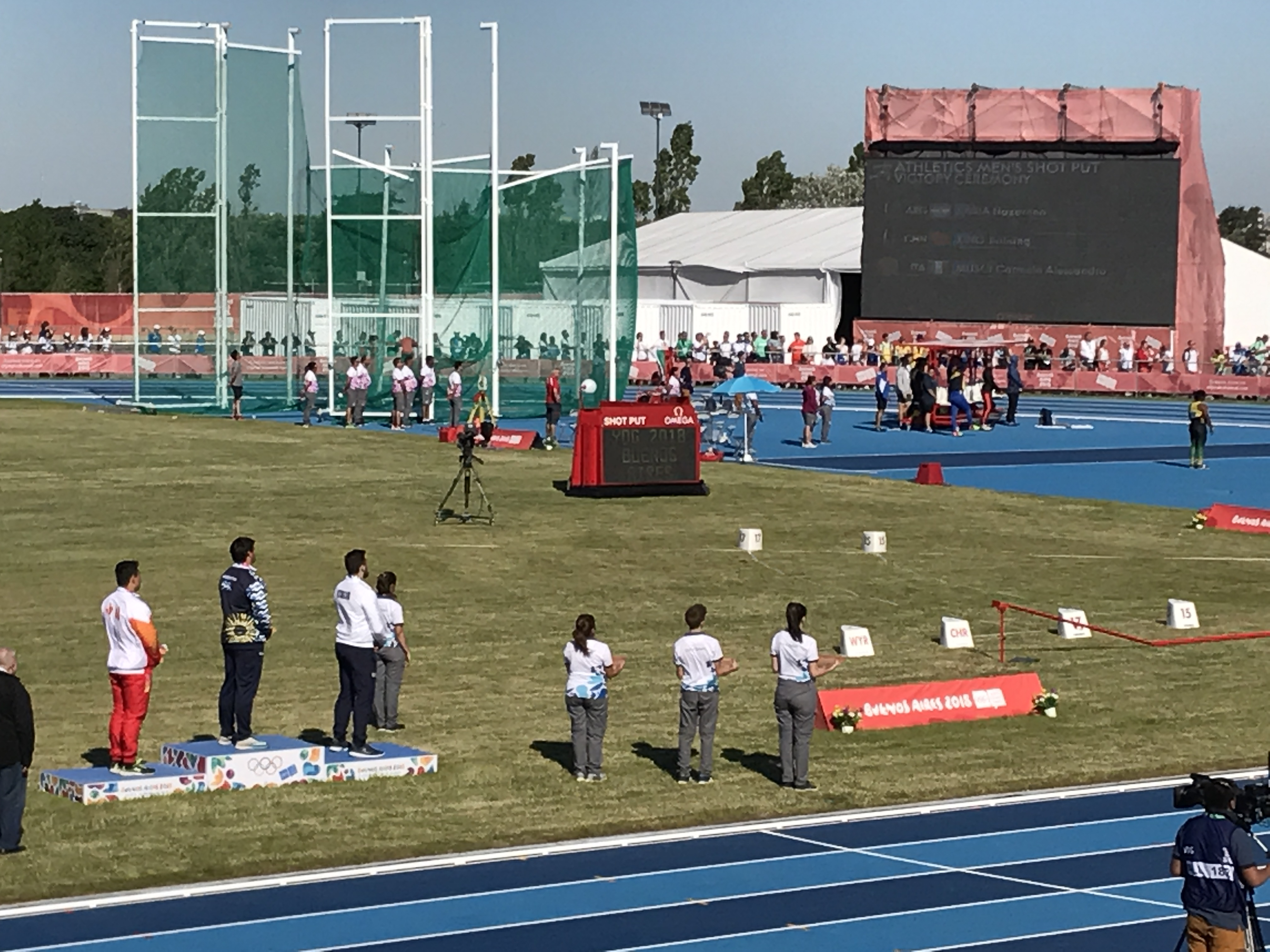
Medal Ceremony, Shot Put

Games	Gold		Silver		Bronze	
100 m	Luke Davids; South Africa	20.71	Alaba Olukunle Akintola; Nigeria	21.00	Seiryō Ikeda; Japan	21.12
200 m	Abdelaziz Mohamed; Qatar	41.78	Antonio Watson; Jamaica	42.41	Lucas Conceição Vilar; Brazil	42.67
400 m	Luis Avilés; Mexico	1:34.23	Kennedy Luchembe; Zambia	1:34.34	Nicholas Ramey; United States	1:34.87
800 m	Tasew Yada; Ethiopia	3:39.76	Mohamed Ali Gouaned; Algeria	3:41.74	Mehmet Çelik; Turkey	3:41.79
1500 m	Jean de Dieu Butoyi; Burundi	4 pts	Anass Essayi; Morocco	4 pts	Melese Nberet; Ethiopia	4 pts
3000 m	Jackson Kavesa Muema; Kenya	4 pts	Berihu Aregawi; Ethiopia	4 pts	Oscar Chelimo; Uganda	4 pts
110 m hurdles	Owaab Barrow; Qatar	26.50	Kenny Fletcher; France	27.01	Addis Wong Lok Hei; Hong Kong	27.13
400 m hurdles	Haruto Deguchi; Japan	1:42.68	Dániel Huller; Hungary	1:43.84	Mohammed Duhaim Al-Muawi; Saudi Arabia	1:45.81
2000 m steeplechase / Cross country	Abrham Sime; Ethiopia	2 pts	Baptiste Guyon; France	8 pts	Abel Yamane; Eritrea	9 pts
5000 m race walk	Óscar Patín; Ecuador	20:13.69	Suraj Panwar; India	20:23.30	Jan Moreu; Puerto Rico	20:28.02
High jump	Chen Long; China	4.35	Oscar Miers; Australia	4.27	Oleh Doroshchuk; Ukraine	4.23
Pole vault	Baptiste Thiery; France	10.37	Kazuki Furusawa; Japan	10.32	Dmitry Kachanov; Russia	10.32
Long jump	Lester Lescay; Cuba	15.54	Joshua Cowley; Australia	15.53	Koki Wada; Japan	15.12
Triple jump	Jordan Díaz; Cuba	34.18	Ineh Oritsemeyiwa; Nigeria	31.85	Praveen Chithravel; India	31.52
Shot put	Nazareno Sasia; Argentina	43.19	Xing Jialiang; China	41.74	Carmelo Alessandro Musci; Italy	41.43
Discus throw	Connor Bell; New Zealand	133.08	Jorge Luis Contreras; Puerto Rico	115.06	Gracjan Kozak; Poland	114.92
Hammer throw	Mykhaylo Kokhan; Ukraine	171.11	Valentin Andreev; Bulgaria	163.96	Wang Qi; China	155.36
Javelin throw	Topias Laine; Finland	153.42	Gustavo Osorio; Argentina	150.28	Martin Florian; Czech Republic	150.24

=== Girls' events ===
Games	Gold		Silver		Bronze	
100 m	Rosemary Chukuma; Nigeria	23.20	Julien Alfred; Saint Lucia	23.22	Anahí Suárez; Ecuador	23.26
200 m	Guðbjörg Jóna Bjarnadóttir; Iceland	47.02	Dalia Kaddari; Italy	47.69	Letícia Maria Nonato Lima; Brazil	47.87
400 m	Barbora Malíková; Czech Republic	1:48.86	Marie Scheppan; Germany	1:50.06	Niddy Mingilishi; Zambia	1:50.48
800 m	Keely Small; Australia	4:10.44	Athing Mu; United States	4:13.24	Hirut Meshesha; Ethiopia	4:14.60
1500 m	Edinah Jebitok; Kenya	2 pts	Jaylah Hancock-Cameron; Australia	6 pts	Lemlem Hailu; Ethiopia	7 pts
3000 m	Sarah Chelangat; Uganda	2 pts	Mercy Chepkorir Kerarei; Kenya	4 pts	Aberash Minsewo; Ethiopia	6 pts
100 m hurdles	Grace Stark; United States	26.14	Sophie White; Australia	26.40	Ackera Nugent; Jamaica	26.41
400 m hurdles	Valeria Cabezas; Colombia	1:57.58	Loubna Benhadja; Algeria	2:00.68	Carla García; Spain	2:00.76
2000 m steeplechase / Cross country	Fancy Cherono; Kenya	2 pts	Mekides Abebe; Ethiopia	5 pts	Parami Wasanthi Maristela; Sri Lanka	7 pts
5000 m race walk	Xi Ricuo; China	45:03.49	Sofia Ramos Rodríguez; Mexico	45:58.97	Olga Fiaska; Greece	46:10.02
High jump	Yaroslava Mahuchikh; Ukraine	3.87	Mariya Kochanova; Russia	3.71	Jessica Kähärä; Finland	3.63
Pole vault	Leni Freyja Wildgrube; Germany	8.12	Emma Brentel; France	7.82	Krystsina Kantsavenka; Belarus	7.72
Long jump	Maité Beernaert; Belgium	12.32	Klaudia Endrész; Hungary	12.31	Ingeborg Grünwald; Austria	12.31
Triple jump	Aleksandra Nacheva; Bulgaria	27.62	María Vicente; Spain	27.43	Mariya Privalova; Russia	26.07
Shot put	Li Xinhui; China	36.75	Yelizaveta Dorts; Belarus	35.13	Dane Roets; South Africa	34.64
Discus throw	Melany Matheus; Cuba	108.65	Violetta Ignatyeva; Russia	107.79	Özlem Becerek; Turkey	103.86
Hammer throw	Valeriya Ivanenko; Ukraine	146.98	Rawan Ayman Ibrahim Barakat; Egypt	136.17	Alegna Osorio; Cuba	127.00
Javelin throw	Elina Tzengko; Greece	125.08	Juleisy Angulo; Ecuador	115.03	Münevver Hancı; Turkey	114.47

== Participating nations ==
A total of 177 countries entered athletes.

- Afghanistan (1)
- Albania (1)
- Algeria (6)
- Antigua and Barbuda (2)
- American Samoa (1)
- Angola (1)
- Argentina (7)
- Australia (13)
- Austria (5)
- Azerbaijan (2)
- Bahamas (6)
- Bahrain (1)
- Barbados (2)
- Belarus (16)
- Belgium (6)
- Belize (1)
- Benin (1)
- Bermuda (1)
- Bhutan (1)
- Bosnia and Herzegovina (2)
- Bolivia (1)
- Botswana (1)
- Brazil (21)
- British Virgin Islands (1)
- Brunei (1)
- Bulgaria (4)
- Burkina Faso (2)
- Burundi (3)
- Cameroon (1)
- Canada (15)
- Cape Verde (2)
- Cayman Islands (2)
- Central African Republic (1)
- Chile (5)
- China (10)
- Colombia (11)
- Comoros (2)
- Republic of the Congo (1)
- Costa Rica (1)
- Croatia (1)
- Cuba (13)
- Cyprus (1)
- Czech Republic (15)
- Democratic Republic of the Congo (1)
- Denmark (1)
- Djibouti (3)
- Dominica (2)
- Dominican Republic (1)
- Ecuador (9)
- Egypt (4)
- Equatorial Guinea (1)
- El Salvador (3)
- Eritrea (5)
- Estonia (6)
- Ethiopia (9)
- Federated States of Micronesia (1)
- Fiji (1)
- Finland (13)
- France (18)
- The Gambia (2)
- Georgia (1)
- Germany (20)
- Ghana (1)
- Greece (14)
- Grenada (2)
- Guatemala (1)
- Guinea (1)
- Guinea-Bissau (1)
- Guyana (2)
- Haiti (2)
- Hong Kong (1)
- Honduras (1)
- Hungary (16)
- Iceland (3)
- India (7)
- Indonesia (2)
- Iran (3)
- Iraq (1)
- Ireland (3)
- Israel (3)
- Italy (13)
- Ivory Coast (1)
- Jamaica (11)
- Jordan (2)
- Japan (14)
- Kazakhstan (5)
- Kenya (10)
- Kiribati (1)
- Kosovo (1)
- Kuwait (1)
- Kyrgyzstan (1)
- Laos (2)
- Latvia (3)
- Liberia (2)
- Lesotho (2)
- Lithuania (3)
- Luxembourg (2)
- Macedonia (1)
- Madagascar (1)
- Malawi (2)
- Malaysia (1)
- Maldives (1)
- Mali (1)
- Malta (1)
- Marshall Islands (1)
- Mauritania (2)
- Morocco (5)
- Mexico (18)
- Moldova (1)
- Monaco (1)
- Mozambique (1)
- Nauru (1)
- Netherlands (1)
- Nepal (1)
- New Zealand (5)
- Nicaragua (1)
- Niger (1)
- Nigeria (5)
- Oman (2)
- Palestine (1)
- Paraguay (1)
- Panama (1)
- Peru (2)
- Poland (15)
- Portugal (6)
- Puerto Rico (4)
- Qatar (3)
- Romania (5)
- Russia (4)
- Rwanda (1)
- Saint Lucia (2)
- Saint Kitts and Nevis (2)
- Saint Vincent and the Grenadines (2)
- São Tomé and Príncipe (2)
- Saudi Arabia (2)
- Serbia (3)
- Senegal (1)
- Seychelles (1)
- Sierra Leone (1)
- Singapore (1)
- Slovakia (6)
- Slovenia (3)
- Solomon Islands (1)
- Somalia (2)
- South Africa (16)
- South Korea (1)
- South Sudan (2)
- Spain (18)
- Sri Lanka (4)
- Sudan (1)
- Suriname (2)
- Eswatini (2)
- Switzerland (9)
- Syria (1)
- Chinese Taipei (11)
- Tanzania (2)
- Thailand (1)
- Timor-Leste (2)
- Togo (1)
- Tonga (1)
- Trinidad and Tobago (2)
- Turkmenistan (2)
- Tunisia (4)
- Turkey (17)
- Tuvalu (1)
- Uganda (3)
- Ukraine (13)
- United States (7)
- Uruguay (2)
- Uzbekistan (4)
- Vanuatu (1)
- Venezuela (5)
- Vietnam (2)
- Virgin Islands (1)
- Yemen (2)
- Zambia (2)
- Zimbabwe (1)
