= Athletics at the 2018 Summer Youth Olympics – Boys' 100 metres =

Boys' 100 metres at the III Summer Youth Olympic Games
- Youth Olympic Athletics
- Venue: Parque Polideportivo Roca
- Date: 12 October and 15 October 2018
- Competitors: 38 from 38 nations

Medalists
1st place, gold medalist(s)		Luke Davids; South Africa
2nd place, silver medalist(s)		Alaba Olukunle Akintola; Nigeria
3rd place, bronze medalist(s)		Seiryo Ikeda; Japan

The boys' 100 metres competition at the 2018 Summer Youth Olympics was held on 12 and 15 October, at the Parque Polideportivo Roca.

== Schedule ==
All times are in local time (UTC-3).

Date	Time	Round
Friday, 12 October 2018	17:05	Stage 1
Monday, 15 October 2018	16:55	Stage 2

== Results ==
=== Stage 1 ===
Rank	Heat	Lane	Athlete	Nation	Result	Notes
1	3	7	Luke Davids	South Africa	10.56	QH5
2	3	2	Alaba Olukunle Akintola	Nigeria	10.76	QH5
3	2	6	Seiryo Ikeda	Japan	10.82	QH5
4	5	4	Fabian Olbert	Germany	10.93	QH5
5	3	8	Ahmed Muhanna Al-Marwani	Saudi Arabia	10.94	QH5
5	4	5	Michali Everett	Jamaica	10.94	QH5
7	2	5	Issa Sangare	Mali	10.97	QH5
8	2	1	Raphael Ngaguele Mberlina	Cameroon	10.98	QH5
9	3	4	Mahdi Rezaei	Iran	10.99	QH4
10	5	2	Shelton Keyrine St. Rose	Saint Lucia	11.01	QH4
11	5	7	Adrian Curry	Bahamas	11.03	QH4
12	1	8	Lucas Rodrigues da Silva	Brazil	11.04	QH4
13	2	2	Mateo Vargas	Paraguay	11.05	QH4
14	5	1	Darian Clarke	Barbados	11.06	QH4
15	4	7	Muhammad Fakhrul Abdul Aziz	Malaysia	11.10	QH4
16	4	6	He Yuhong	China	11.15	QH4
17	1	6	Romar Hariston Stapleton	Saint Vincent and the Grenadines	11.16	QH3
18	3	3	Rafał Łupiński	Poland	11.24	QH3
19	1	3	Adi Ramli Sidiq	Indonesia	11.26	QH3
20	1	1	Tadeáš Formánek	Czech Republic	11.27	QH3
20	4	3	Luis Rodríguez	Puerto Rico	11.27	QH3
22	1	7	Dominik Illovszky	Hungary	11.33	QH3
22	2	8	Gary Rankin	Cayman Islands	11.33	QH3
24	5	5	Martin Alejandro Troera Trujillo	Mexico	11.39	QH3
25	2	3	Noah Conteh	Sierra Leone	11.45	QH2
26	4	4	Dominic Cole	Trinidad and Tobago	11.52	QH2
27	1	5	Timo Castrini	Switzerland	11.58	QH2
28	5	8	Bongumenzi Mbingo	Eswatini	11.70	QH2
29	2	7	Sunnyboy Barcon	Liberia	11.76	QH2, PB
30	5	6	Fabio Moniz	São Tomé and Príncipe	11.82	QH2
31	3	5	Ibadulla Adam	Maldives	11.88	QH2, PB
32	3	6	Ronward Hinarua	Solomon Islands	11.89	QH1
33	4	8	Kanaee Saloa Tauia	Tuvalu	11.95	QH1
34	4	2	Vat Saisouly	Laos	11.95	QH1, PB
35	2	3	Guy Robert Michel	Haiti	11.99	QH1
35	5	3	Iosefa Mauga Jr.	American Samoa	11.99	QH1, PB
37	1	2	Marcelo Gomes	Cape Verde	12.08	QH1
38	2	4	Andrii Vasyliev	Ukraine	12.21	QH1

=== Stage 2 ===
Rank	Heat	Lane	Athlete	Nation	Result	Notes
1	5	3	Luke Davids	South Africa	10.15	
2	5	4	Alaba Olukunle Akintola	Nigeria	10.24	
3	5	6	Seiryo Ikeda	Japan	10.30	
4	5	7	Michali Everett	Jamaica	10.44	
5	5	1	Raphael Ngaguele Mberlina	Cameroon	10.51	
6	4	4	Mahdi Rezaei	Iran	10.57	
7	5	5	Fabian Olbert	Germany	10.59	
7	3	7	Tadeáš Formánek	Czech Republic	10.59	
7	3	6	Adi Ramli Sidiq	Indonesia	10.59	
10	4	8	Mateo Vargas	Paraguay	10.61	
10	5	2	Issa Sangare	Mali	10.61	
12	4	5	Lucas Rodrigues da Silva	Brazil	10.62	
13	4	3	Adrian Curry	Bahamas	10.64	
14	3	4	Romar Hariston Stapleton	Saint Vincent and the Grenadines	10.67	
15	4	6	Shelton Keyrine St. Rose	Saint Lucia	10.70	
16	4	1	Muhammad Fakhrul Abdul Aziz	Malaysia	10.73	
16	3	3	Rafał Łupiński	Poland	10.73	
18	4	2	He Yuhong	China	10.75	
19	3	5	Luis Rodríguez	Puerto Rico	10.77	
20	4	7	Darian Clarke	Barbados	10.78	
21	3	8	Dominik Illovszky	Hungary	10.82	
22	3	1	Gary Rankin	Cayman Islands	10.83	
23	3	2	Martin Alejandro Troera Trujillo	Mexico	10.88	
24	2	6	Noah Conteh	Sierra Leone	10.95	
25	2	4	Timo Castrini	Switzerland	10.97	
26	2	5	Dominic Cole	Trinidad and Tobago	11.01	
27	2	3	Bongumenzi Mbingo	Eswatini	11.18	
28	2	2	Ibadulla Adam	Maldives	11.32	
29	2	8	Sunnyboy Barcon	Liberia	11.33	
30	2	7	Fabio Moniz	São Tomé and Príncipe	11.40	
31	1	7	Guy Robert Michel	Haiti	11.44	SB
32	1	5	Kanaee Saloa Tauia	Tuvalu	11.45	PB
33	1	6	Vat Saisouly	Laos	11.61	PB
34	1	4	Iosefa Mauga Jr.	American Samoa	11.61	PB
35	1	8	Marcelo Gomes	Cape Verde	11.71	SB
36	1	2	Andrii Vasyliev	Ukraine	42.46	
	1	3	Ronward Hinarua	Solomon Islands	DQ	R 162.8
	2	4	Ahmed Muhanna I ALmarwani	Saudi Arabia	DQ	R 162.8

=== Final placing ===
Rank	Athlete	Nation	Stage 1	Stage 2	Total
1st place, gold medalist(s)	Luke Davids	South Africa	10.56	10.15	20.71
2nd place, silver medalist(s)	Alaba Olukunle Akintola	Nigeria	10.76	10.24	21.00
3rd place, bronze medalist(s)	Seiryo Ikeda	Japan	10.82	10.30	21.12
4	Michali Everett	Jamaica	10.94	10.44	21.38
5	Raphael Ngaguele Mberlina	Cameroon	10.98	10.51	21.49
6	Fabian Olbert	Germany	10.93	10.59	21.52
7	Mahdi Rezaei	Iran	10.99	10.57	21.56
8	Issa Sangare	Mali	10.97	10.61	21.58
9	Mateo Vargas	Paraguay	11.05	10.61	21.66
10	Lucas Rodrigues da Silva	Brazil	11.04	10.62	21.66
11	Adrian Curry	Bahamas	11.03	10.64	21.67
12	Shelton Keyrine St. Rose	Saint Lucia	11.01	10.70	21.71
13	Romar Hariston Stapleton	Saint Vincent and the Grenadines	11.16	10.67	21.83
14	Muhammad Fakhrul Abdul Aziz	Malaysia	11.10	10.73	21.83
15	Darian Clarke	Barbados	11.06	10.78	21.84
16	Adi Ramli Sidiq	Indonesia	11.26	10.59	21.85
17	Tadeáš Formánek	Czech Republic	11.27	10.59	21.86
18	He Yuhong	China	11.15	10.75	21.90
19	Rafał Łupiński	Poland	11.24	10.73	21.97
20	Luis Rodríguez	Puerto Rico	11.27	10.77	22.04
21	Dominik Illovszky	Hungary	11.33	10.82	22.15
22	Gary Rankin	Cayman Islands	11.33	10.83	22.16
23	Martin Alejandro Troera Trujillo	Mexico	11.39	10.88	22.27
24	Noah Conteh	Sierra Leone	11.45	10.95	22.40
25	Dominic Cole	Trinidad and Tobago	11.52	11.01	22.53
26	Timo Castrini	Switzerland	11.58	10.97	22.55
27	Bongumenzi Mbingo	Eswatini	11.70	11.18	22.88
28	Sunnyboy Barcon	Liberia	11.76	11.33	23.09
29	Ibadulla Adam	Maldives	11.88	11.32	23.20
30	Fabio Moniz	São Tomé and Príncipe	11.82	11.40	23.22
31	Kanaee Saloa Tauia	Tuvalu	11.95	11.45	23.40
32	Guy Robert Michel	Haiti	11.99	11.44	23.43
33	Vat Saisouly	Laos	11.96	11.61	23.56
34	Iosefa Mauga Jr.	American Samoa	11.99	11.61	23.60
35	Marcelo Gomes	Cape Verde	12.08	11.71	23.79
36	Andrii Vasyliev	Ukraine	12.21	42.46	54.67
	Ahmed Muhanna Al-Marwani	Saudi Arabia	10.94	DQ	
	Ronward Hinarua	Solomon Islands	11.89	DQ	
