= Taekwondo at the 2018 Summer Youth Olympics =

Taekwondo at the III Summer Youth Olympic Games
- Venue: Parque Polideportivo Roca
- Dates: 7–11 October
- No. of events: 10 (5 boys, 5 girls)
- Competitors: 100 (50 boys and 50 girls) from 58 nations

The taekwondo tournament at the 2018 Summer Youth Olympics was held between 7 and 11 October in Buenos Aires, Argentina.

100 athletes participated in the tournament, that took place at the Parque Polideportivo Roca in Buenos Aires.

== Qualification ==
=== Summary ===
NOC	Boys					Girls					Total
NOC	48 kg	55 kg	63 kg	73 kg	+73 kg	44 kg	49 kg	55 kg	63 kg	+63 kg	Total
Afghanistan					X						1
Argentina		X	X			X					3
Armenia				X							1
Azerbaijan			X			X					2
Belgium				X							1
Bhutan							X				1
Brazil								X			1
Canada					X						1
Cape Verde		X									1
Chad				X							1
China							X	X		X	3
Chinese Taipei				X	X						2
Colombia										X	1
Croatia	X					X			X		3
Czech Republic									X		1
Democratic Republic of the Congo			X								1
Djibouti						X					1
Ecuador				X							1
Egypt				X	X			X			3
Gabon								X			1
Georgia	X										1
Germany								X			1
Great Britain		X					X			X	3
Greece		X		X				X			3
Iran			X	X	X	X			X	X	6
Israel		X					X				2
Italy			X						X		2
Ivory Coast									X		1
Japan		X									1
Jordan		X						X	X		3
Kazakhstan						X	X				2
Libya			X								1
Macedonia								X			1
Mali										X	1
Mexico						X			X		2
Mongolia	X										1
Morocco								X		X	2
Nicaragua				X							1
Niger		X									1
Norway					X						1
Palestine	X										1
Poland					X					X	2
Russia	X	X				X	X			X	5
São Tomé and Príncipe									X		1
Saudi Arabia			X								1
Serbia		X		X					X		3
Slovenia					X						1
South Korea	X	X	X			X	X				5
South Sudan			X								1
Spain		X									1
Sweden							X				1
Thailand			X				X	X			3
Tunisia	X								X		2
Turkey						X				X	2
Ukraine			X								1
United States	X						X				2
Uzbekistan	X										1
Vietnam							X				1
58 NOCs	9	12	11	10	8	10	11	10	10	9	100

=== Men's events ===
Competition	NOC Qualified				
Competition	-48 kg	-55 kg	-63 kg	-73 kg	+73 kg
Host country	–	Argentina	Argentina	–	–
WT Qualification Tournament	Uzbekistan; Russia; Tunisia; Georgia; South Korea; United States; Croatia	Russia; Greece; Jordan; Serbia; Spain; ~~China~~; South Korea	Iran; Ukraine; ~~Russia~~; Italy; South Korea; Saudi Arabia; Thailand; Azerbaijan	Egypt; Iran; Armenia; Belgium; Ecuador; Chinese Taipei; Greece; Serbia	Egypt; Chinese Taipei; Canada; Iran; Slovenia; Norway; Poland
Universality Places	~~Comoros~~; Palestine	Cape Verde; Niger	Democratic Republic of the Congo; Libya; South Sudan	Chad; Nicaragua	Afghanistan
Reallocation	Mongolia	Great Britain; Japan; Israel			
Total	9	12	11	10	8

=== Women's events ===
Competition	NOC Qualified				
Competition	-44 kg	-49 kg	-55 kg	-63 kg	+63 kg
Host country	Argentina	–	–	–	–
WT Qualification Tournament	Russia; South Korea; Croatia; Mexico; Turkey; Iran; ~~Italy~~; Azerbaijan	United States; China; Russia; Great Britain; South Korea; Vietnam; Thailand	Greece; Jordan; Brazil; Thailand; China; Egypt; Morocco	Mexico; Serbia; Italy; Iran; Jordan; Tunisia; Croatia; Czech Republic	China; Iran; Russia; Poland; Morocco; Turkey; Great Britain
Universality Places	Djibouti	Bhutan; ~~Cambodia~~	Gabon; Macedonia	Ivory Coast; São Tomé and Príncipe	Mali; ~~Tonga~~
Reallocation	Kazakhstan	Israel; Kazakhstan; Sweden	Germany		Colombia
Total	10	11	10	10	9

== Medal table ==
Rank	Nation	Gold	Silver	Bronze	Total
1	Russia	4	0	1	5
2	Iran	3	1	0	4
3	South Korea	1	2	2	5
4	Morocco	1	1	0	2
4	Thailand	1	1	0	2
6	Belgium	0	1	0	1
6	Chinese Taipei	0	1	0	1
6	Serbia	0	1	0	1
6	United States	0	1	0	1
6	Uzbekistan	0	1	0	1
11	China	0	0	2	2
11	Italy	0	0	2	2
11	Mexico	0	0	2	2
14	Afghanistan	0	0	1	1
14	Azerbaijan	0	0	1	1
14	Brazil	0	0	1	1
14	Canada	0	0	1	1
14	Croatia	0	0	1	1
14	Ecuador	0	0	1	1
14	Egypt	0	0	1	1
14	Greece	0	0	1	1
14	Jordan	0	0	1	1
14	Niger	0	0	1	1
14	Tunisia	0	0	1	1
Totals (24 entries)		10	10	20	40

== Medallists ==
=== Boys ===
Event	Gold	Silver	Bronze
Boys' 48 kg	Dmitrii Shishko; Russia	Ulugbek Rashitov; Uzbekistan	Im Seong-bin; South Korea
Boys' 48 kg	Dmitrii Shishko; Russia	Ulugbek Rashitov; Uzbekistan	Mohamed Khalil Jendoubi; Tunisia
Boys' 55 kg	Georgii Popov; Russia	Kim Kang-min; South Korea	Mahamadou Maharana Amadou't; Niger
Boys' 55 kg	Georgii Popov; Russia	Kim Kang-min; South Korea	Zaid Kareem; Jordan
Boys' 63 kg	Cho Won-hee; South Korea	Nareupong Thepsen; Thailand	Javad Aghayev; Azerbaijan
Boys' 63 kg	Cho Won-hee; South Korea	Nareupong Thepsen; Thailand	Gabriele Caulo; Italy
Boys' 73 kg	Ali Eshkevarian; Iran	Badr Achab; Belgium	Eyad Adel Mahmoud; Egypt
Boys' 73 kg	Ali Eshkevarian; Iran	Badr Achab; Belgium	Darlyn Padilla; Ecuador
Boys' +73 kg	Mohammad Ali Khosravi; Iran	Lee Meng-en; Chinese Taipei	Nisar Ahmad Abdul Rahimzai; Afghanistan
Boys' +73 kg	Mohammad Ali Khosravi; Iran	Lee Meng-en; Chinese Taipei	Ethan McClymont; Canada

=== Girls ===
Event	Gold	Silver	Bronze
Girls' 44 kg	Polina Shcherbakova; Russia	Kang Mi-reu; South Korea	Alicia Rodríguez; Mexico
Girls' 44 kg	Polina Shcherbakova; Russia	Kang Mi-reu; South Korea	Lena Stojković; Croatia
Girls' 49 kg	Elizaveta Ryadninskaya; Russia	Anastasija Zolotic; United States	Lee Ye-ji; South Korea
Girls' 49 kg	Elizaveta Ryadninskaya; Russia	Anastasija Zolotic; United States	Cao Zihan; China
Girls' 55 kg	Kanthida Saengsin; Thailand	Safia Salih; Morocco	Fani Tzeli; Greece
Girls' 55 kg	Kanthida Saengsin; Thailand	Safia Salih; Morocco	Sandy Macedo; Brazil
Girls' 63 kg	Yalda Valinejad; Iran	Nadica Božanić; Serbia	Leslie Soltero; Mexico
Girls' 63 kg	Yalda Valinejad; Iran	Nadica Božanić; Serbia	Assunta Cennamo; Italy
Girls' +63 kg	Fatima-Ezzahra Aboufaras; Morocco	Kimia Hemmati; Iran	Mu Wenzhe; China
Girls' +63 kg	Fatima-Ezzahra Aboufaras; Morocco	Kimia Hemmati; Iran	Kristina Adebaio; Russia
