= Taekwondo at the 2018 Summer Youth Olympics – Girls' 63 kg =

Girls' 63 kg at the III Summer Youth Olympic Games
- Venue: Oceania Pavilion
- Date: 10 October 2018
- Competitors: 11 from 11 nations

Medalists
| 1st place, gold medalist(s) | | Yalda Valinejad | Iran |
| 2nd place, silver medalist(s) | | Nadica Božanić | Serbia |
| 3rd place, bronze medalist(s) | | Leslie Soltero | Mexico |
| 3rd place, bronze medalist(s) | | Assunta Cennamo | Italy |

The girls' 63 kg competition at the 2018 Summer Youth Olympics was held on 10 October at the Oceania Pavilion.

== Schedule ==
All times are in local time (UTC-3).

| Date | Time | Round |
|---|---|---|
| Wednesday, 10 October 2018 | 14:00; 15:15; 19:00; 20:00 | Round of 16; Quarterfinals; Semifinals; Final |

=== Bracket ===
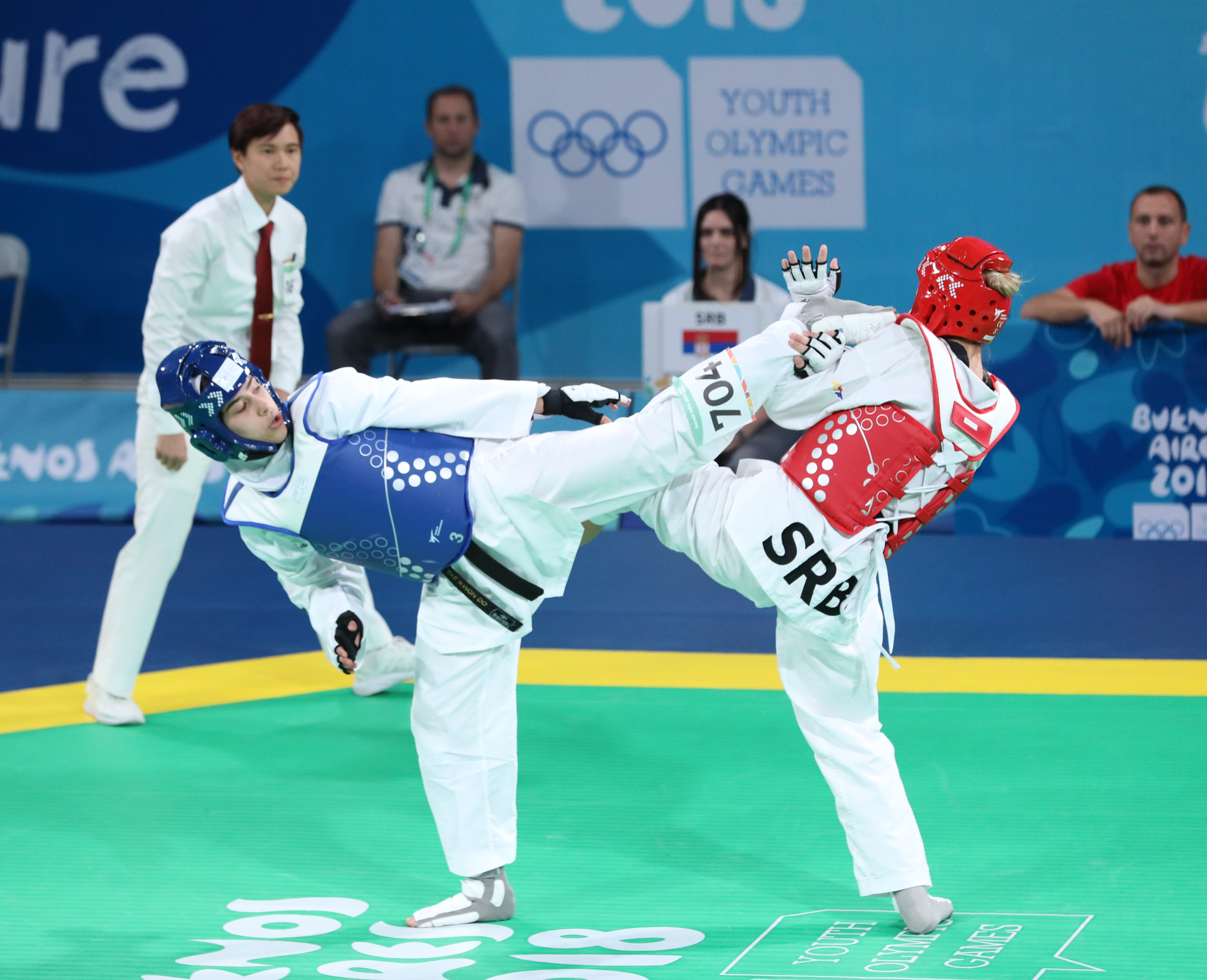
Final: Yalda Valinejad vs. Nadica Božanić

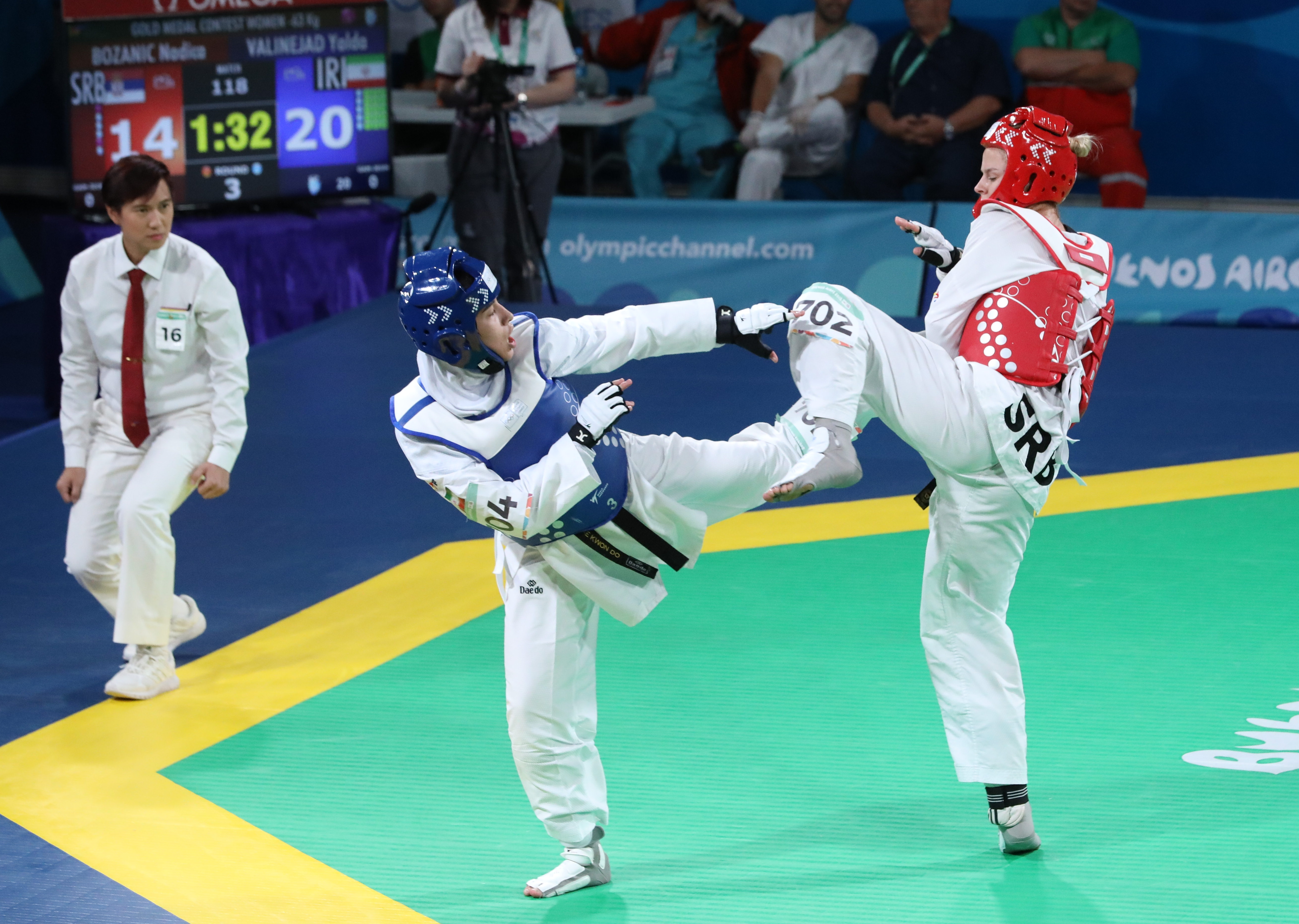
Final: Yalda Valinejad vs. Nadica Božanić

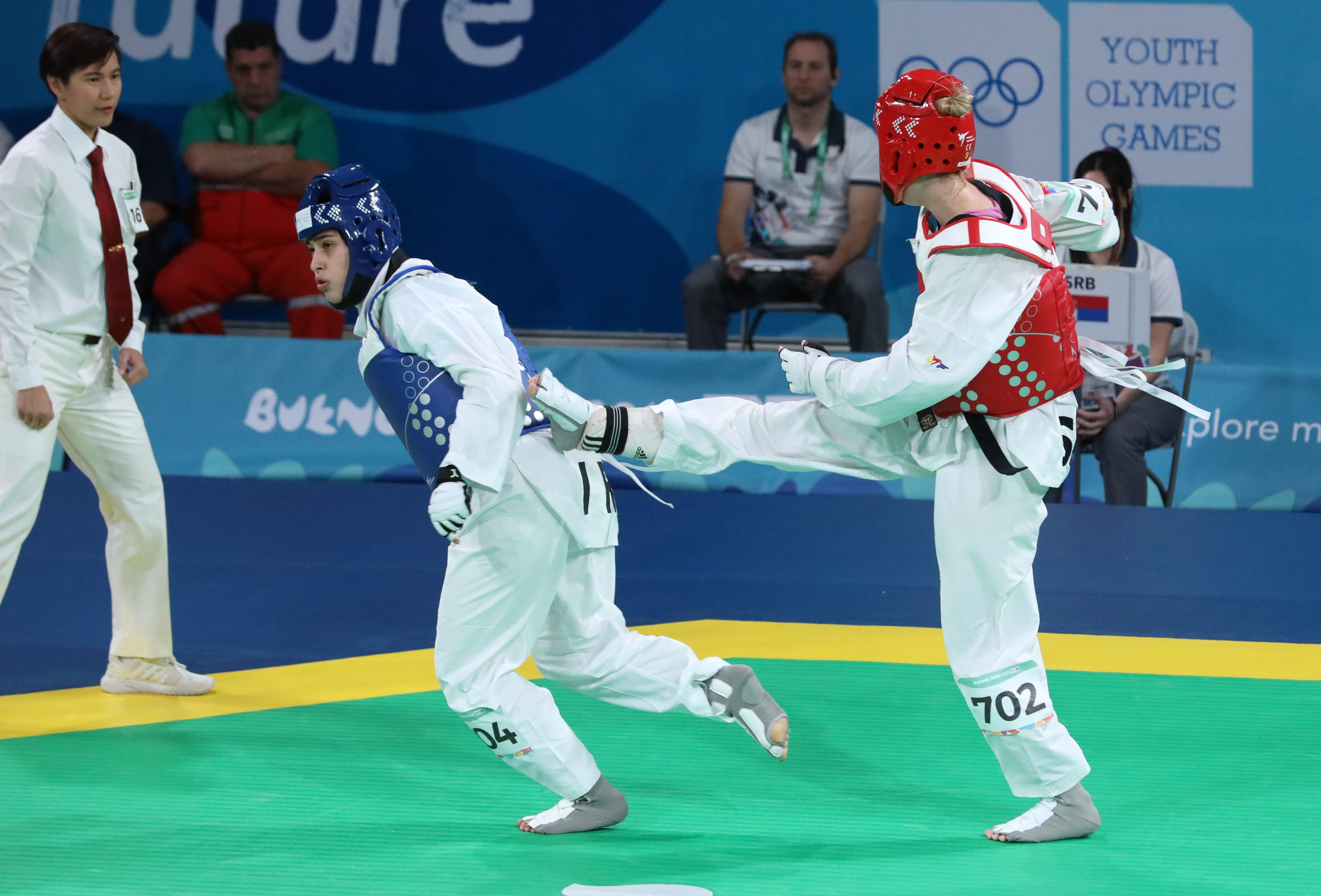
Final: Yalda Valinejad vs. Nadica Božanić

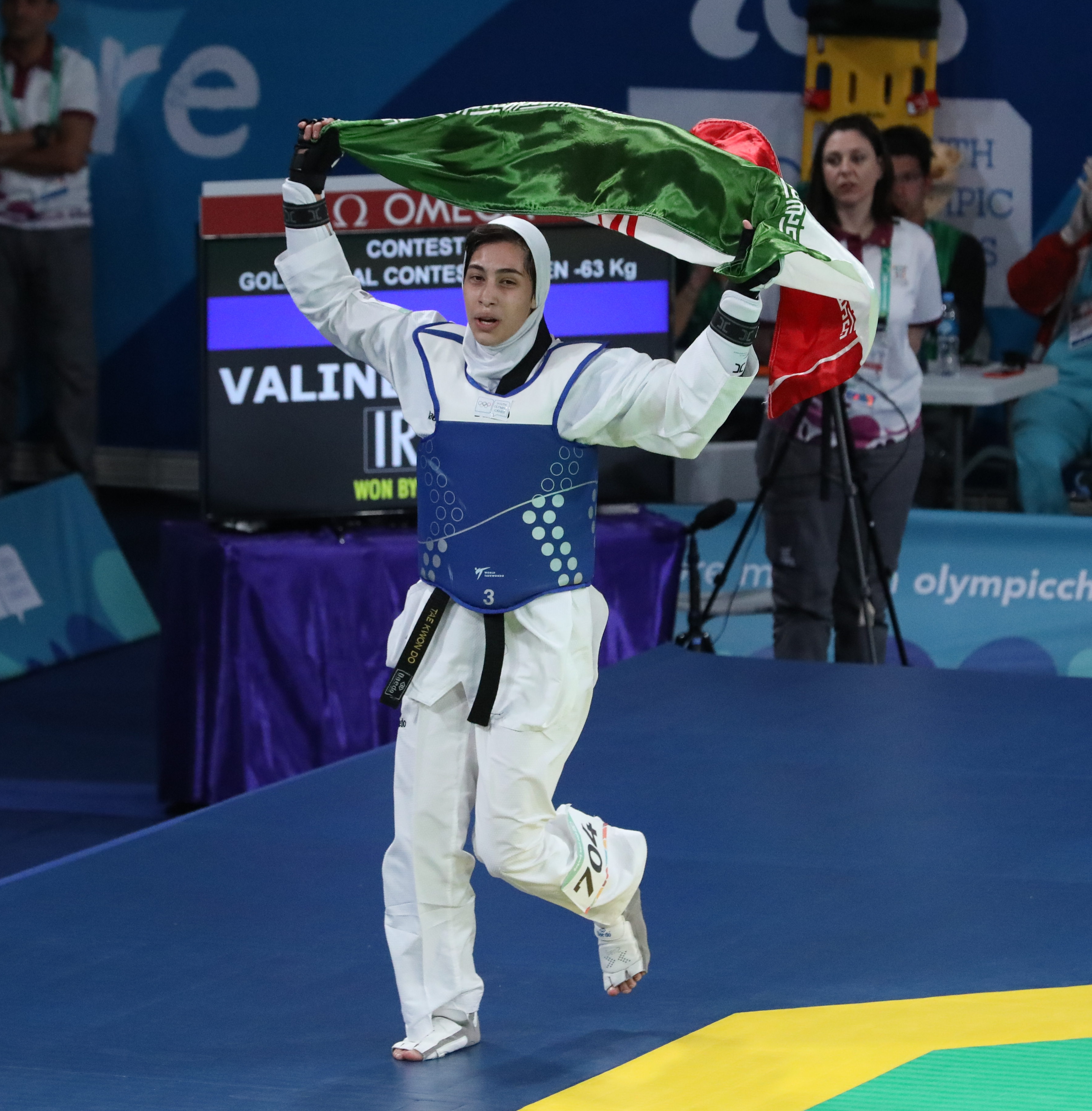
Yalda Valinejad (Youth Olympic Games Champion)

Round of 16
9 | Koumba Ibo (CIV) | 16
8 | Petra Štolbová (CZE) | 27
11 | Sara Neto (STP) | 0
6 | Asma Haji (TUN) | 21
7 | Lucija Domić (CRO) | 35
10 | Fanta Traoré (MLI) | 8

Quarterfinals
1 | Leslie Soltero (MEX) | 18
8 | Petra Štolbová (CZE) | 8
5 | Natali Hamaidi (JOR) | 2
4 | Yalda Valinejad (IRI) | 12
3 | Assunta Cennamo (ITA) | 11
6 | Asma Haji (TUN) | 8
7 | Lucija Domić (CRO) | 7
2 | Nadica Božanić (SRB) | 13

Semifinals
1 | Leslie Soltero (MEX) | 22
4 | Yalda Valinejad (IRI) | 26
3 | Assunta Cennamo (ITA) | 4
2 | Nadica Božanić (SRB) | 16

Gold medal match
4 | Yalda Valinejad (IRI) | 23
2 | Nadica Božanić (SRB) | 17
