= Luke Davids =

South African sprinter (born 2001)

Personal information
- Born: 17 July 2001 (age 24) Cape Town, South Africa

Sport
- Country: South Africa
- Sport: Track and field
- Events: 100 metres; 200 metres

Achievements and titles
- Personal best: 10.31 – 100m (2018)
Medal record
Men's sprinting
Representing South Africa
Summer Youth Olympics
Gold medal – first place	2018 Buenos Aires	100 m
African Youth Games
Gold medal – first place	2018 Algiers	100 m
Silver medal – second place	2018 Algiers	200 m

Luke Davids (born 17 July 2001) is a South African sprinter. He won the gold medal in the 100 metres event at the 2018 Summer Youth Olympics held in Buenos Aires, Argentina.

In 2018, he won the gold medal in the 100 metres event at the 2018 African Youth Games in Algiers, Algeria. He also won the silver medal in the 200 metres event. At the 2019 African U18 and U20 Championships in Athletics held in Abidjan, Ivory Coast, he won the bronze medal in the 100 metres event and the silver medal in the 200 metres event.
