= Mali at the 2018 Summer Youth Olympics =

- IOC code: MLI
- NOC: Comité National Olympique et Sportif du Mali

in Buenos Aires, Argentina 6 – 18 October 2018
- Competitors: 3 in 3 sports
- Medals: Gold 0 Silver 0 Bronze 0 Total 0

Summer Youth Olympics appearances
- 2010; 2014; 2018

Mali participated at the 2018 Summer Youth Olympics in Buenos Aires, Argentina from 6 October to 18 October 2018.

== Competitors ==
Sports	Boys	Girls	Total	Events
Athletics	1	0	1	1
Swimming	1	0	1	2
Taekwondo	0	1	1	1
Total	2	1	3	4

== Athletics ==
Athlete	Event	Stage 1		Stage 2		Total	
Athlete	Event	Time	Rank	Time	Rank	Time	Rank
Issa Sangare	Boys' 100 m	10.97	7	10.61	10	21.58	8

== Swimming ==
Athlete	Event	Heats		Semifinals		Final	
Athlete	Event	Time	Rank	Time	Rank	Time	Rank
Ousmane Touré	Boys' 50 m butterfly	28.32	47	did not advance			
Ousmane Touré	Boys' 100 m butterfly	1:04.02	45	did not advance			

== Taekwondo ==
- Girls' 63 kg

Athlete	Event	Round of 16	Quarterfinals	Semifinals	Final	
Athlete	Event	Opposition Result	Opposition Result	Opposition Result	Opposition Result	Rank
Fanta Traoré	Girls' 63 kg	Lucija Domić (CRO); L 8-35	did not advance			
