= Sierra Leone at the 2018 Summer Youth Olympics =

- IOC code: SLE
- NOC: National Olympic Committee of Sierra Leone

in Buenos Aires, Argentina 6 – 18 October 2018
- Competitors: 4 in 3 sports
- Medals: Gold 0 Silver 0 Bronze 0 Total 0

Summer Youth Olympics appearances
- 2010; 2014; 2018

Sierra Leone participated at the 2018 Summer Youth Olympics in Buenos Aires, Argentina from 6 October to 18 October 2018.

== Competitors ==
The following is the list of number of competitors participating at the Games per sport/discipline.

Sport	Men	Women	Total
Athletics	1	0	1
Beach volleyball	0	2	2
Swimming	1	0	1
Total	2	2	4

== Athletics ==
Athlete	Event	Stage 1		Stage 2		Total	
Athlete	Event	Time	Rank	Time	Rank	Time	Rank
Noah Conteh	100 m	11.45	25	10.95	24	22.40	24

== Beach Volleyball ==
- Girls' tournament - 1 team of 2 athletes

Athletes	Event	Preliminary round		Round of 24	Round of 16	Quarterfinals	Semifinals	Final / BM	
Athletes	Event	Opposition Score	Rank	Opposition Score	Opposition Score	Opposition Score	Opposition Score	Opposition Score	Rank
Isatu Mariama Wurrie Bah; Kaday Iye Kairah	Girls'	Allcca–Mendoza (PER); L 0–2; Sinaportar–Mucheza (MOZ); L 0–2; Olimstad–Berntsen (NOR); L 0–2	4	did not advance					

== Swimming ==
Athlete	Event	Heats		Semifinals		Final	
Athlete	Event	Time	Rank	Time	Rank	Time	Rank
Joshua Wyse	Boys' 50 metre freestyle	28.57	47	did not advance			

== See also ==
- Sierra Leone at the 2018 Commonwealth Games
