= Eswatini at the 2018 Summer Youth Olympics =

- IOC code: SWZ
- NOC: Eswatini Olympic and Commonwealth Games Association
- Website: www.socga.org.sz

in Buenos Aires
- Competitors: 3 in 2 sports
- Medals: Gold 0 Silver 0 Bronze 0 Total 0

Summer Youth Olympics appearances
- 2010; 2014; 2018

Eswatini competed at the 2018 Summer Youth Olympics in Buenos Aires, Argentina from 6 October to 18 October 2018.

== Competitors ==
Sport	Boys	Girls	Total
Athletics	1	1	2
Swimming	0	1	1

== Athletics ==
Boys

Athlete	Event	Stage 1		Stage 2		Total	
Athlete	Event	Result	Rank	Result	Rank	Total	Rank
Bongumenzi Mbingo	Boys' 100 m	11.70	6	11.18	4	22.88	27

Girls

Athlete	Event	Stage 1		Stage 2		Total	
Athlete	Event	Result	Rank	Result	Rank	Total	Rank
Khanyisile Hlatshwako	Girls' 1500 m	5:12.56	8	16:00	51	21:12.56	16

== Swimming ==
Girls

Athlete	Event	Heat		Semifinal		Final	
Athlete	Event	Time	Rank	Time	Rank	Time	Rank
Robyn Young	100 m freestyle	1:06.53	45	did not advance			
Robyn Young	50 m backstroke	32.34	34	did not advance			
Robyn Young	100 m backstroke	DNS		did not advance			
