= South Sudan at the 2018 Summer Youth Olympics =

- IOC code: SSD
- NOC: South Sudan National Olympic Committee

in Buenos Aires, Argentina 6 – 18 October 2018
- Competitors: 3 in 2 sports
- Medals: Gold 0 Silver 0 Bronze 0 Total 0

Summer Youth Olympics appearances
- 2018

South Sudan participated at the 2018 Summer Youth Olympics in Buenos Aires, Argentina from 6 October to 18 October 2018.

== Competitors ==
Sport	Boys	Girls	Total
Athletics	1	1	2
Taekwondo	1	0	1
Total	2	1	3

== Athletics ==
Track and road events

Athlete	Event	Stage 1		Stage 2		Total	
Athlete	Event	Result	Rank	Result	Rank	Total	Rank
Akoon	Boys' 800 metres	1:54.54	19	DNS		DNF	
Jein Kiden Clement Morgan	Girls' 100 metres	14.84	38	13.84	35	28.68	35

== Taekwondo ==
Athlete	Event	Round of 16	Quarterfinals	Semifinals	Final	
Athlete	Event	Opposition Result	Opposition Result	Opposition Result	Opposition Result	Rank
Stephen Chol Atem	63 kg	Aghayev (AZE); L DSQ	did not advance			
