= Saint Lucia at the 2018 Summer Youth Olympics =

- IOC code: LCA
- NOC: St. Lucia Olympic Committee

in Buenos Aires, Argentina 6 – 18 October 2018
- Competitors: 3 in 2 sports
- Medals Ranked 79th: Gold 0 Silver 1 Bronze 0 Total 1

Summer Youth Olympics appearances
- 2010; 2014; 2018

Saint Lucia participated at the 2018 Summer Youth Olympics in Buenos Aires, Argentina from 6 October to 18 October 2018.

== Medalists ==
Medal	Name	Sport	Event	Date
Silver	Julien Alfred	Athletics	Girls' 100 metres	15 Oct

== Competitors ==
Sports	Boys	Girls	Total	Events
Athletics	1	1	2	2
Swimming	1	0	1	2
Total	2	1	3	4

== Athletics ==
Saint Lucia qualified two athletes, one male and one female.

Athlete	Event	Stage 1		Stage 2		Total	
Athlete	Event	Result	Rank	Result	Rank	Total	Rank
Shelton Keyrine St. Rose	Boys' 100 metres	11.01	10	10.70	15	10.70	12
Julien Alfred	Girls' 100 metres	11.99	2	11.23	2	11.23	2nd place, silver medalist(s)

== Swimming ==
Saint Lucia qualified one athlete.

Athlete	Event	Heat		Semifinal		Final	
Athlete	Event	Time	Rank	Time	Rank	Time	Rank
Jayhan Odlum-Smith	Boys' 50 metre butterfly	25.74	38	did not advance			
Jayhan Odlum-Smith	Boys' 100 metre freestyle	54.99	38	did not advance			
