= Yalda Valinejad =

Iranian athlete

Personal information
- Full name: Yalda Valinejad
- Nationality: Iranian
- Born: March 23, 2002 (age 24) Karaj , Iran

Sport
- Country: Iran
- Sport: Taekwondo
- Weight class: 70 kg
- Coached by: Mahrouz Saei (National Team)
Medal record
Women's Taekwondo
Representing Iran
Asian Championships
Bronze medal – third place	2026 Ulaanbaatar	62 kg
Youth Olympic Games
Gold medal – first place	2018 Buenos Aires	63 kg
Islamic Solidarity Games
Silver medal – second place	2025 Riyadh	70 kg
Asian Junior Championships
Gold medal – first place	2017 Atyrau	59 kg
Gold medal – first place	2019 Amman	63 kg

Yalda Valinejad (Persian: یلدا ولی نژاد; born March 23, 2002 In Karaj) is an Iranian Taekwondo athlete. She won a gold medal at the 2018 Summer Youth Olympics in the Women's 62 kg Weight Class.
