= Cape Verde at the 2018 Summer Youth Olympics =

- IOC code: CPV
- NOC: Comité Olímpico Caboverdeano

in Buenos Aires, Argentina 6 – 18 October 2018
- Competitors: 3 in 2 sports
- Medals: Gold 0 Silver 0 Bronze 0 Total 0

Summer Youth Olympics appearances
- 2010; 2014; 2018

Cape Verde participated at the 2018 Summer Youth Olympics in Buenos Aires, Argentina from 6 October to 18 October 2018.

== Competitors ==
Sport	Boy	Girl	Total
Athletics	1	1	2
Taekwondo	1	0	1

== Athletics ==
Boys

Athlete	Event	Stage 1		Stage 2		Total	
Athlete	Event	Time	Rank	Time	Rank	Time	Rank
Marcelo Gomes	100 m	12.08	37	11.71	35	23.79	35

Girls

Athlete	Event	Stage 1		Stage 2		Total	
Athlete	Event	Time	Rank	Time	Rank	Time	Rank
Adriana Almeida	100 m	12.89	24	DQ		DQ	

== Taekwondo ==
Athlete	Event	Round of 16	Quarterfinals	Semifinals	Final	
Athlete	Event	Opposition Score	Opposition Score	Opposition Score	Opposition Score	Rank
Nicalas Fernandes	Boys' 55 kg	Hugo Arillo (ESP); DQ	did not advance			
