= Somalia at the 2018 Summer Youth Olympics =

- IOC code: SOM
- NOC: Somali Olympic Committee
- Website: www.nocsom.org

in Buenos Aires, Argentina 6 – 18 October 2018
- Competitors: 2 in 1 sports
- Medals: Gold 0 Silver 0 Bronze 0 Total 0

Summer Youth Olympics appearances
- 2010; 2014; 2018

Somalia participated at the 2018 Summer Youth Olympics in Buenos Aires, Argentina from 6 October to 18 October 2018.

== Competitors ==
Sports	Boys	Girls	Total	Events
Athletics	1	1	2	2
Total	1	1	2	2

== Athletics ==
Somalia qualified 2 athletes.

Athlete	Event	Stage 1		Stage 2		Final Placing
Athlete	Event	Result	Rank	Result	Rank	Final Placing
Yusuf Ali Abdirashid	Boys' 1500m/Cross Country	4:08.66	18	13:42	20	19
Jiijo Hassan Mohamed	Girls' 400 metres	1:20.76	24	DNS		
