= Cayman Islands at the 2018 Summer Youth Olympics =

- Flag of the Cayman Islands
- IOC code: CAY
- NOC: Cayman Islands Olympic Committee

in Buenos Aires, Argentina 6 – 18 October 2018
- Competitors: 3 in 2 sports
- Medals: Gold 0 Silver 0 Bronze 0 Total 0

Summer Youth Olympics appearances
- 2010; 2014; 2018; 2026

The Cayman Islands competed at the 2018 Summer Youth Olympics, in Buenos Aires, Argentina from 6 to 18 October, 2018.

== Competitors ==
Sports	Boys	Girls	Total	Events
Athletics	1	1	2	
Swimming	1	0	1	

== Athletics ==
Athlete	Event	Stage 1		Stage 2		Total	
Athlete	Event	Time	Rank	Time	Rank	Time	Rank
Gary Rankin	Boys' 100 metres	11.33	22	10.83	22	22.16	22
Danneika Lyn	Girls' 100 metres	13.15	27	13.15	26	25.86	26
