= São Tomé and Príncipe at the 2018 Summer Youth Olympics =

- IOC code: STP
- NOC: Comité Olímpico de São Tomé e Príncipe

in Buenos Aires, Argentina 6 – 18 October 2018
- Competitors: 4 in 3 sports
- Medals: Gold 0 Silver 0 Bronze 0 Total 0

Summer Youth Olympics appearances
- 2010; 2014; 2018

São Tomé and Príncipe participated at the 2018 Summer Youth Olympics in Buenos Aires, Argentina from 6 October to 18 October 2018.

== Competitors ==
Sport	Boys	Girls	Total
Athletics	1	1	2
Canoeing	1	0	1
Taekwondo	0	1	1
Total	2	2	4

== Athletics ==
Track and road events

Athlete	Event	Stage 1		Stage 2		Total	
Athlete	Event	Result	Rank	Result	Rank	Total	Rank
Fabio Moniz	Boys' 100 metres	11.82	30	11.40	30	23.22	30
Edzinadia Ceita	Girls' 100 metres	13.45	28	12.85	27	26.30	27

== Canoeing ==
São Tomé and Príncipe was given one boat to compete by the tripartite committee.

- Boys' C1 - 1 boat

Boys

Athlete	Event	Qualification		Repechage		Round of 16	Semifinals	Final / BM	Rank
Athlete	Event	Time	Rank	Time	Rank	Opposition Result	Opposition Result	Opposition Result	Rank
Alex Antunes	C1 sprint	2:09.00	13	2:11.16	10	did not advance			
Alex Antunes	C1 slalom	DSQ		did not advance					

== Taekwondo ==
- Girls' 63 kg

Athlete	Event	Round of 16	Quarterfinals	Semifinals	Final	
Athlete	Event	Opposition Result	Opposition Result	Opposition Result	Opposition Result	Rank
Sara Neto	Girls' 63 kg	Asma Haji (TUN); L 0-21	did not advance			
