= Qatar at the 2018 Summer Youth Olympics =

- IOC code: QAT
- NOC: Qatar Olympic Committee
- Website: http://www.olympic.qa/

in Buenos Aires, Argentina 6 – 18 October 2018
- Competitors: 5
- Medals Ranked 39th: Gold 2 Silver 0 Bronze 0 Total 2

Summer Youth Olympics appearances
- 2010; 2014; 2018

Qatar participated at the 2018 Summer Youth Olympics in Buenos Aires, Argentina from 6 October to 18 October 2018. Qatar had 5 competitors and won two gold medals.

== Equestrian ==
Qatar qualified a rider based on its ranking in the FEI World Jumping Challenge Rankings.

- Individual Jumping - 1 athlete

Athlete	Horse	Event	Qualification					Final					Total	
Athlete	Horse	Event	Round 1		Round 2			Round A		Round B			Total	
Athlete	Horse	Event	Penalties	Rank	Penalties	Total	Rank	Penalties	Rank	Penalties	Total	Rank	Penalties	Rank
Mohammed Alqashouti	Pietro	Individual	—					16	=27	Eliminated			Eliminated	
Mix Australasia; Almarzooqi (UAE); Najafinia (IRI); Burnett-Grant (NZL); Alqashouti (QAT); Sinderberry (AUS)	La Corina Lala; La Trinidad; Milagro Maximo; Pietro; Zambo	Team	24	=1 Q	36	60	5	—					60	4
