= Liberia at the 2018 Summer Youth Olympics =

- IOC code: LBR
- NOC: Liberia National Olympic Committee

in Buenos Aires, Argentina 6 – 18 October 2018
- Competitors: 2 in 1 sport
- Medals: Gold 0 Silver 0 Bronze 0 Total 0

Summer Youth Olympics appearances
- 2010; 2014; 2018

Liberia participated at the 2018 Summer Youth Olympics in Buenos Aires, Argentina from 6 October to 18 October 2018.

== Athletics ==
Athlete	Event	Stage 1		Stage 2		Total	
Athlete	Event	Result	Rank	Result	Rank	Total	Rank
Sunnyboy Barcon	Boys' 100 metres	11.76	29	11.33	29	23.09	28
Princess Dunah	Girls' 100 metres	14.37	34	13.67	32	28.04	33
