= Libya at the 2018 Summer Youth Olympics =

- IOC code: LBA
- NOC: Libyan Olympic Committee
- Website: http://www.olympic.ly/

in Buenos Aires, Argentina 6 – 18 October 2018
- Competitors: 2 in 2 sports
- Medals: Gold 0 Silver 0 Bronze 0 Total 0

Summer Youth Olympics appearances
- 2010; 2014; 2018

Libya participated at the 2018 Summer Youth Olympics in Buenos Aires, Argentina from 6 October to 18 October 2018.

== Judo ==
- Boys' -66kg - 1 quota

Individual

Athlete	Event	Round of 16	Quarterfinals	Semifinals	Repechage		Final / BM	Rank
Athlete	Event	Round of 16	Quarterfinals	Semifinals	Quarterfinals	Semifinals	Final / BM	Rank
Athlete	Event	Opposition Result	Opposition Result	Opposition Result	Opposition Result	Opposition Result	Opposition Result	Rank
Mohammed Al-Mishri	Boys' 66 kg	Turpal Djoukaev (FIN); L 00-10	did not advance		Simon Zulu (ZAM); L 00s1-10s1	did not advance		

Team

Team	Event	Round 1	Round 2	Semifinals	Final	Rank
Team	Event	Opposition Result	Opposition Result	Opposition Result	Opposition Result	Rank
Seoul; Mohammed Al-Mishri (LBA); Alex Barto (SVK); Sairy Colón (PUR); María Giménez (VEN); Yuri Israelyan (ARM); Kim Ju-hee (KOR); Omaria Ramírez (DOM); Wu Xiao-zhang (TPE)	Mixed Team	Los Angeles; L 3–5	did not advance			9

== Weightlifting ==
Libya qualified one athlete based on its performance at the 2018 African Youth Championships.

- Boys' events - 1 quota
