= Barbados at the 2018 Summer Youth Olympics =

- IOC code: BAR
- NOC: Barbados Olympic Association
- Website: www.olympic.org.bb

in Buenos Aires, Argentina 6 – 18 October 2018
- Competitors: 4 in 2 sports
- Medals: Gold 0 Silver 0 Bronze 0 Total 0

Summer Youth Olympics appearances
- 2010; 2014; 2018

Barbados participated at the 2018 Summer Youth Olympics in Buenos Aires, Argentina from 6 October to 18 October 2018.

== Athletics ==
Barbados qualified 2 athletes.

Athlete	Event	Stage 1		Stage 2		Total	
Athlete	Event	Time	Rank	Time	Rank	Time	Rank
Darian Clarke	Boys' 100 metres	11.06	14	10.78	20	21.84	15
Sarah Belle	Girls' 100 metre hurdles	14.06	9	14.32	16	28.38	12

== Swimming ==
Barbados qualified 2 athletes.
