= Kiribati at the 2018 Summer Youth Olympics =

- IOC code: KIR
- NOC: Kiribati National Olympic Committee

in Buenos Aires, Argentina 6 – 18 October 2018
- Competitors: 2 in 2 sports
- Flag bearer: Martin Tamoaieta
- Officials: David Katoatau
- Medals: Gold 0 Silver 0 Bronze 0 Total 0

Summer Youth Olympics appearances
- 2010; 2014; 2018

Kiribati participated at the 2018 Summer Youth Olympics in Buenos Aires, Argentina from 6 October to 18 October 2018.

== Athletics ==
Kiribati was given a quota for a female sprinter, Darina McDermott.

Athlete	Event	Stage 1		Stage 2		Total	
Athlete	Event	Result	Rank	Result	Rank	Total	Rank
Darina McDermott	Girls' 100 metres	14.87	39	14.19	37	29.06	37

== Rowing ==
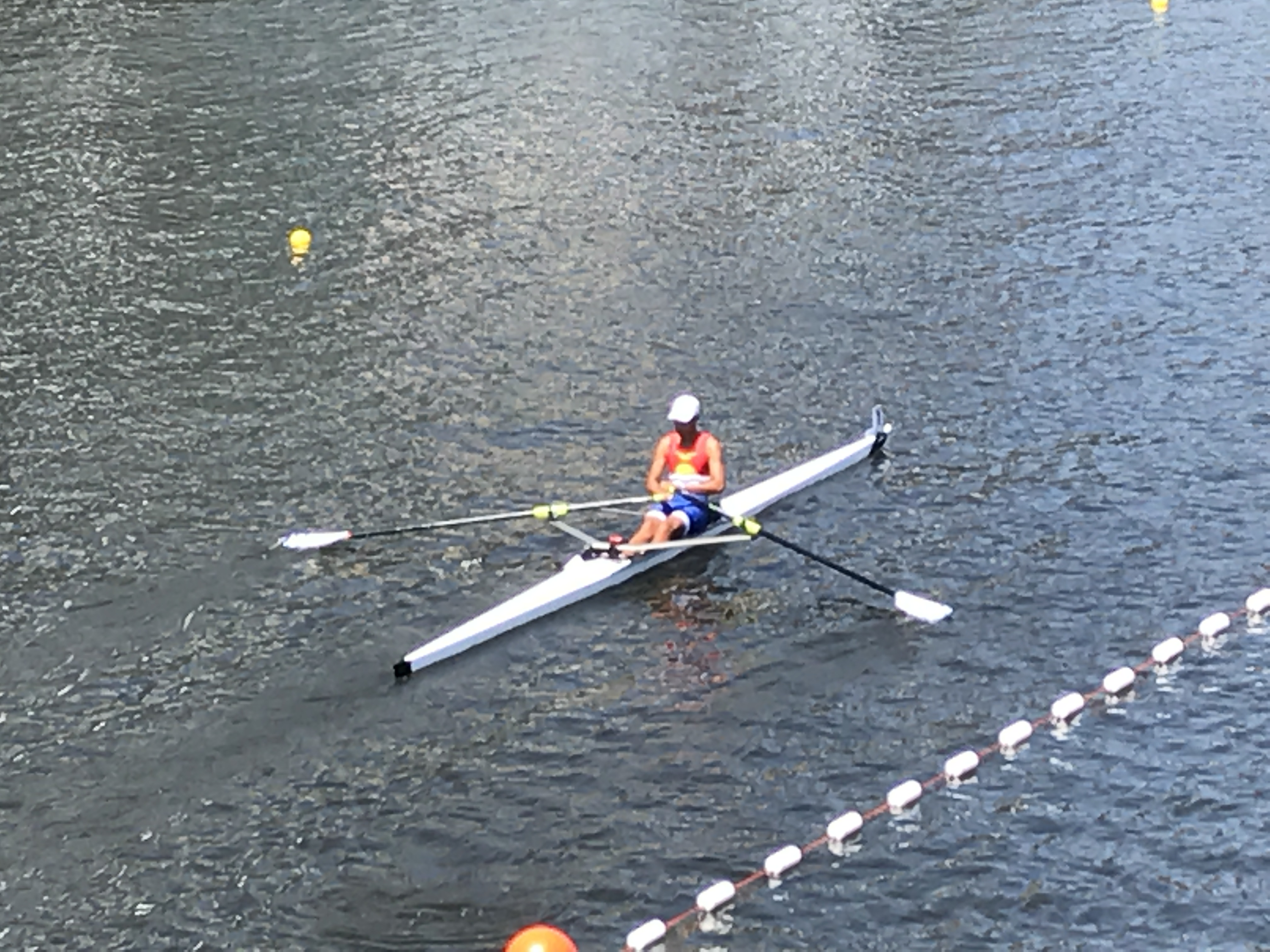
Martin Tamoaieta, flagbearer

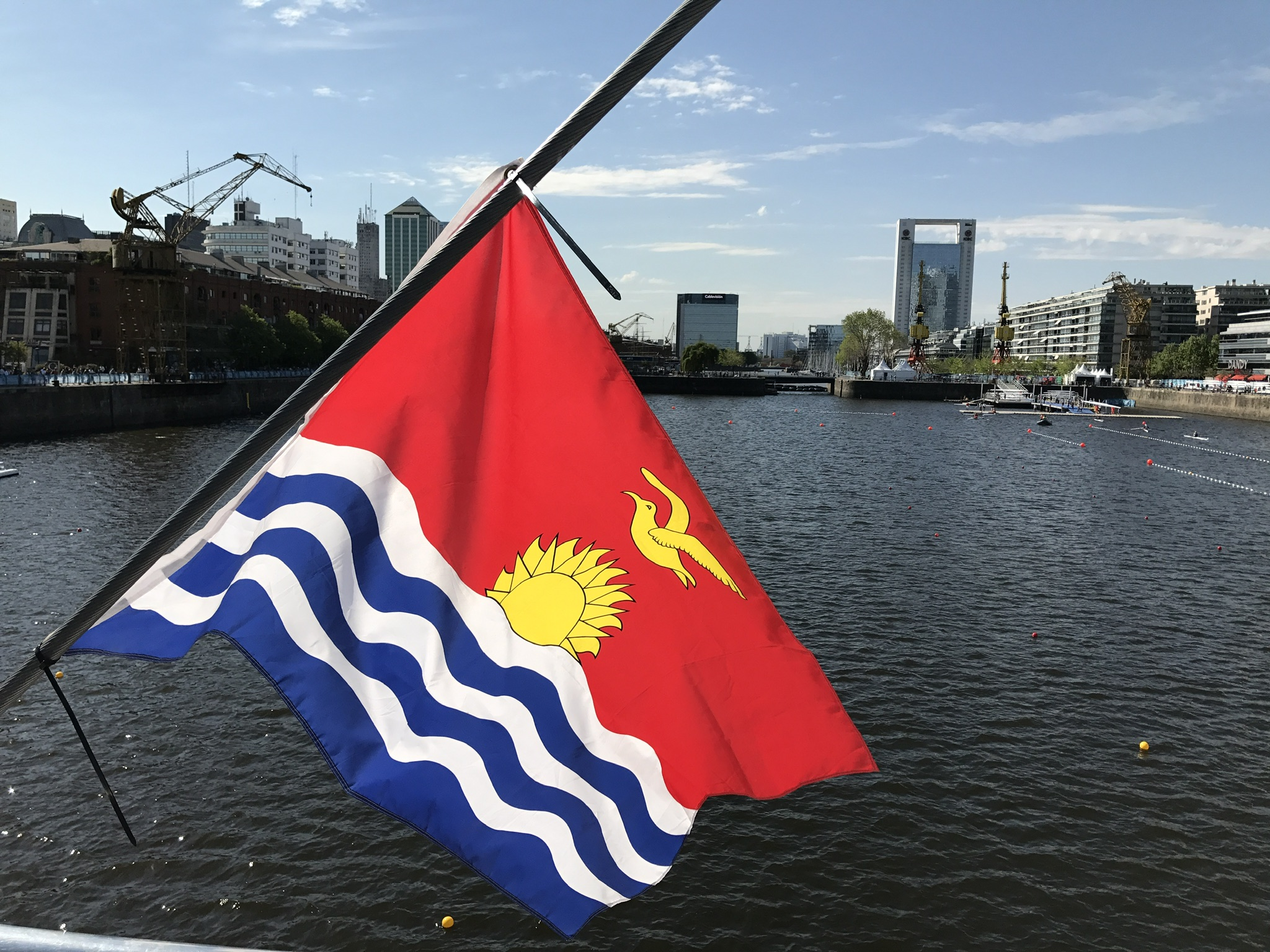
Puente de la Mujer.

Kiribati qualified one boat based on its performance at the Oceania Youth Olympic Games Qualification event.

- Boys' single sculls - 1 athlete, Martin Tamoaieta.

== Weightlifting ==
Kiribati was given a quota by the tripartite committee to compete in weightlifting, but the KNOC did not select an athlete from Kiribati.

- ~~Boys' events - 1 quota~~ (not used)
