= Malawi at the 2018 Summer Youth Olympics =

- IOC code: MAW
- NOC: Olympic and Commonwealth Games Association of Malawi

in Buenos Aires, Argentina 6 – 18 October 2018
- Competitors: 4 in 2 sports
- Medals: Gold 0 Silver 0 Bronze 0 Total 0

Summer Youth Olympics appearances
- 2010; 2014; 2018

Malawi participated at the 2018 Summer Youth Olympics in Buenos Aires, Argentina from 6 October to 18 October 2018.
