= Haiti at the 2018 Summer Youth Olympics =

- IOC code: HAI
- NOC: Haitian Olympic Committee

in Buenos Aires, Argentina 6 – 18 October 2018
- Competitors: 3 in 2 sports
- Medals: Gold 0 Silver 0 Bronze 0 Total 0

Summer Youth Olympics appearances
- 2010; 2014; 2018

Haiti participated at the 2018 Summer Youth Olympics in Buenos Aires, Argentina from 6 October to 18 October 2018.

== Equestrian ==
Haiti was given a rider to compete from the tripartite committee.

- Individual Jumping - 1 athlete

Athlete	Horse	Event	Round 1		Round 2			Total		Jump off		
Athlete	Horse	Event	Penalties	Rank	Penalties	Total	Rank	Penalties	Rank	Penalties	Total	Rank
Mateo Philippe Coles	Quid Du Plessis	Individual Jumping	4	2	4	4	13	8	13	did not advance		
North America; Nicole Meyer Robredo (MEX); Mateo Philippe Coles (HAI); Marissa del Pilar Thompson (PAN); Pedro Espinosa (HON); Mattie Hatcher (USA)	El Capricho Champion; Quid Du Plessis; Canal Del Bajo Kithira; Llavaneras Genquina; Santa Rosa Valery	Team Jumping	4 # 0; 0; 0; 0 #	0	4 # 0; 0; 4 # 0	0	0	4 # 0 # 0; 0; 0	0	38.07 # 34.55 # 34.07; 32.16; 31.66	97.89	1st place, gold medalist(s)
