= Bahamas at the 2018 Summer Youth Olympics =

- IOC code: BAH
- NOC: Bahamas Olympic Committee

in Buenos Aires, Argentina 6 – 18 October 2018
- Competitors: 7 in 2 sports
- Medals: Gold 0 Silver 0 Bronze 0 Total 0

Summer Youth Olympics appearances
- 2010; 2014; 2018

The Bahamas participated at the 2018 Summer Youth Olympics in Buenos Aires, Argentina from 6 October to 18 October 2018.

== Athletics ==
The Bahamas qualified 5 athletes.

== Swimming ==
The Bahamas qualified 2 athletes.
