= Nicaragua at the 2018 Summer Youth Olympics =

- IOC code: NCA
- NOC: Nicaragua Olympic Committee

in Buenos Aires, Argentina 6 – 18 October 2018
- Competitors: 4
- Medals: Gold 0 Silver 0 Bronze 0 Total 0

Summer Youth Olympics appearances
- 2010; 2014; 2018

Nicaragua participated at the 2018 Summer Youth Olympics in Buenos Aires, Argentina from 6 October to 18 October 2018.

== Rowing ==
Nicaragua was given a quota to compete in rowing.

- Boys' single sculls - 1 athlete

== Taekwondo ==
Athlete	Event	Round of 16	Quarterfinals	Semifinals	Final / BM	
Athlete	Event	Opposition Result	Opposition Result	Opposition Result	Opposition Result	Rank
David Robleto	Boys' −73 kg	Qiu Hong-sheng (TPE); L 8-15	did not advance			

== Weightlifting ==
Nicaragua was given a quota by the tripartite committee to compete in weightlifting.

- ~~Girls' events - 1 quota~~ (not used)
