= Solomon Islands at the 2018 Summer Youth Olympics =

- IOC code: SOL
- NOC: National Olympic Committee of Solomon Islands

in Buenos Aires, Argentina 6 – 18 October 2018
- Competitors: 12 in 3 sports
- Medals: Gold 0 Silver 0 Bronze 0 Total 0

Summer Youth Olympics appearances
- 2010; 2014; 2018

The Solomon Islands participated at the 2018 Summer Youth Olympics in Buenos Aires, Argentina from 6 October to 18 October 2018.

== Futsal ==
1 team of 10 athletes

=== Boys' tournament ===
Group stage

Pos	Team	Pld	W	D	L	GF	GA	GD	Pts	Qualification
1	Brazil	4	4	0	0	25	4	+21	12	Semi-finals
2	Russia	4	3	0	1	19	12	+7	9	Semi-finals
3	Iran	4	2	0	2	19	11	+8	6	
4	Costa Rica	4	1	0	3	17	27	−10	3	
5	Solomon Islands	4	0	0	4	13	39	−26	0	

Source: FIFA IOC
7 October 2018
20:00

Iran	9–2	Solomon Islands
Alizadeh 6', 12', 22'; Ghanbari 11'; Tamizi 18', 37'; Esmaeili 35', 36'; Sarbaz 38'	Report (FIFA); Report (IOC)	Lea'i 23', 39'

CeNARD
Attendance: 0
Referee: José Barrera (El Salvador)

9 October 2018
18:00

Solomon Islands	6–11	Costa Rica
Kofana 4', 15'; Mana 19'; Lea'i 20'; Rukumana 39'; Chavarria 39' (o.g.)	Report (FIFA); Report (IOC)	Carvajal 1'; León 7', 21', 22', 25'; Chavarria 8'; Madriz 11'; Vado 16'; Corrales 18', 26'; Baez 37'

Tecnópolis
Attendance: 1,350
Referee: Lance Vanhaitsma (United States)

10 October 2018
20:00

Russia	10–4	Solomon Islands
Karpiuk 1', 12', 13'; Sysoliatin 10'; Okulov 12', 39'; Karpov 14'; Fedorov 19'; Gereikhanov 28'; Samusenko 34'	Report (FIFA); Report (IOC)	Lea'i 18', 22', 29', 38'

CeNARD
Attendance: 576
Referee: Chiara Perona (Italy)

13 October 2018
18:00

Solomon Islands	1–9	Brazil
Mana 26'	Report (FIFA); Report (IOC)	Guilhermão 1', 10', 21', 24'; Vitão 5'; Cromwell 10' (o.g.); Breno 11'; Wesley 38', 38'

CeNARD
Attendance: 0
Referee: Chiara Perona (Italy)

== Weightlifting ==
The Solomon Islands were given a quota by the tripartite committee to compete in weightlifting.

Athlete	Event	Snatch		Clean & jerk		Total	Rank
Athlete	Event	Result	Rank	Result	Rank	Total	Rank
Betty Waneasi	Girls' 58 kg	57	8	72	8	129	8th
