= Jamaica at the 2018 Summer Youth Olympics =

- IOC code: JAM
- NOC: Jamaica Olympic Association

in Buenos Aires, Argentina 6 – 18 October 2018
- Competitors: 12 in 2 sports
- Medals Ranked 76th: Gold 0 Silver 1 Bronze 1 Total 2

Summer Youth Olympics appearances
- 2010; 2014; 2018

Jamaica participated at the 2018 Summer Youth Olympics in Buenos Aires, Argentina from 6 October to 18 October 2018.
