= 2018 Summer Youth Olympics =

Multi-sport event in Buenos Aires, Argentina

III Summer Youth Olympic Games
- Location: Buenos Aires, Argentina
- Motto: Feel the future (Spanish: Viví el futuro)
- Nations: 206
- Athletes: 3,997
- Events: 239 in 32 sports
- Opening: 6 October
- Closing: 18 October
- Opened by: President Mauricio Macri
- Closed by: IOC president Thomas Bach
- Cauldron: Santiago Lange and Paula Pareto
- Stadium: Parque Polideportivo Roca

The 2018 Summer Youth Olympics (Spanish: Juegos Olímpicos de la Juventud de 2018), officially known as the III Summer Youth Olympic Games, and commonly known as Buenos Aires 2018, were an international sports, cultural, and educational event held from 6 to 18 October 2018 in Buenos Aires, Argentina. They were the first Youth Olympic Games held outside of Eurasia, the first Summer Games held outside of Asia, and the first to be held in the Western and Southern hemispheres.

They were the second Olympic Games held in South America after the 2016 Summer Olympics in Rio de Janeiro, Brazil and were also the final Summer Youth Olympic Games under the IOC presidency of Thomas Bach, as the subsequent Summer Youth Olympics in 2022 was postponed to 2026 as a result of the worldwide COVID-19 pandemic.

== Bidding ==
Six bids were initially submitted for the 2018 Summer Youth Olympics. Buenos Aires confirmed their bid in September 2011. On 13 February 2013, the IOC selected Buenos Aires as one of the three Candidate Cities for the 2018 Summer Youth Olympic Games. The other two candidate cities were Glasgow and Medellín. Guadalajara and Rotterdam failed to become candidates. Poznań withdrew their bid before the candidate cities were selected.

The host city election vote was held at an IOC Session in Lausanne. The results were as follows:

2018 Summer Youth Olympics bidding results
City	Nation	Round 1	Round 2
Buenos Aires	Argentina	40	49
Medellín	Colombia	32	39
Glasgow	United Kingdom	13	–

== Development and preparation ==
=== Organisation ===
In October 2013, International Olympic Committee (IOC) President Thomas Bach appointed Namibian sprinter and four-time Olympic silver medalist Frank Fredericks as Chairman of the Coordination Commission for the 3rd Summer Youth Olympic Games — Buenos Aires 2018. Fredericks was heading the six-person IOC Coordination Commission made up of several Olympians including Danka Bartekova, the youngest IOC Member and Young Ambassador from the inaugural Youth Olympic Games in Singapore in 2010. This commission was completed by two other IOC members, China's Li Lingwei, winner of three World Badminton Championships, and Barry Maister, a member of New Zealand's hockey team that won the Olympic gold medals at 1976 Summer Olympics in Montreal; and Adham Sharara, Canadian President of the International Table Tennis Federation, and Henry Nuñez, head of the National Olympic Committee of Costa Rica. Working along with them there was the Buenos Aires Youth Olympic Games Organising Committee (BAYOGOC), that includes member of the Argentine Olympic Committee (AOC), the local government and the national government, and which CEO was Leandro Larrosa. The local organising committee involves young people in all levels of the organization; including an 'Athlete Commission' and a newly established 'Youth Commission' – a group of young consultants chosen by the AOC from local schools and universities – and the employees within BAYOGOC from junior to director level. The first Coordination Commission meeting took place in Buenos Aires on 27–28 September 2014.

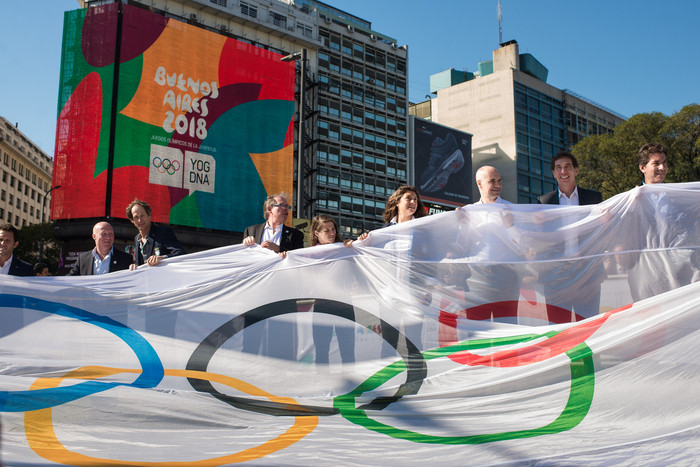
Olympic Flag at Plaza de la República

During June 2015 a small delegation from Nanjing Youth Olympic Games Organizing Committee (NYOGOC) visited Buenos Aires for a series of debriefing workshops and seminars to pass on their expertise focusing on strategic decisions to be made in the early stages such as legacy, the use of the YOG to impact youth and sport, and benefits of the YOG to engage communities. The CEOs of Singapore 2010, Lillehammer 2016 and Innsbruck 2012 also took part of these meetings that were presided over by Frank Fredericks.

Football player and Olympic gold medalist Lionel Messi, originally not from Buenos Aires but from Rosario, was named as an ambassador of the 2018 YOG in March 2014, and he delivered a video welcoming message for the young athletes to Buenos Aires during the closing ceremony of the 2014 Summer Youth Olympics. In December 2015, the four-time Olympic medalist Luciana Aymar was also named as an ambassador of Buenos Aires 2018. In July 2017, Olympic gold medalist Luis Scola was named ambassador of the 2018 YOG.

Joining the Olympic programme for the first time at Buenos Aires 2018 were BMX freestyle, kitesurfing, cross country running, beach handball, sport climbing, karate, breakdancing, and roller sports; and the event programme saw an increased gender balance. FIFA also decided to replace football with futsal at the Buenos Aires Youth Olympics, while other sports such as skateboarding were being considered for the programme. Roller speed skating was added to the Olympic programme on 17 March 2017.

Three years before the event, a survey showed that public support had reached 82.3 per cent in favour of the Youth Olympic games in Buenos Aires. During the second visit of the International Olympic Committee's Coordination Commission to the city, on 13 and 14 August 2015, Mr. Fredericks highlighted the implementation of 13 of the recommendation of the Agenda 2020 by BAYOGOC.

=== Venues ===
Locations of the venues for the 2018 YOG within Buenos Aires: Green Park, Olympic Park, Urban Park, Techno Park

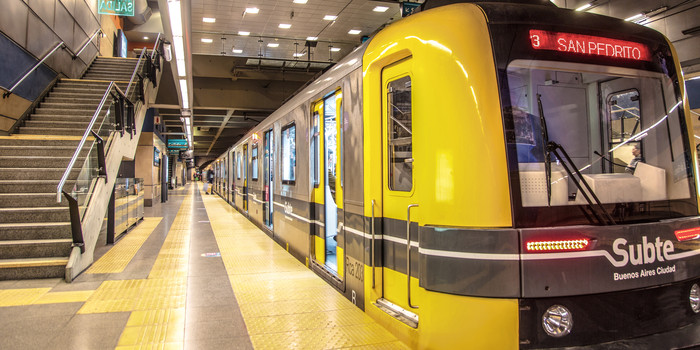
Buenos Aires Underground

The original plan was based on the bid for the 2004 Summer Olympics, in which a 15 km long Olympic Corridor would have worked instead of a more concentrated Olympic Park. For the Buenos Aires bid for the 2018 Summer Youth Olympics the Olympic Corridor was adapted into a Green Corridor, one of the two main sports zones as the primary sites of the Games in Buenos Aires 2018, being the other one Parque Roca, to the south of the city. The Green Corridor and the Olympic Corridor shared River Plate Stadium, Tiro Federal, Gimnasia y Esgrima de Buenos Aires, Parque Tres de Febrero, La Bombonera, La Rural and CeNARD as venues.

In order to group the sports in a more compact framework, in September 2014 a new four-clusters concept was revealed, dropping out venues such as La Rural. It was announced then that each cluster would include an area called YOG FEST where sporting experiences, family entertainment and cultural activities would take place. But at the 129th IOC Session, in August 2016, a new venues masterplan was presented, including two new stand-alone venues, adding La Rural once again and replacing Parque Sarmiento with Tecnópolis.

The International Olympic Committee members stayed at the Sheraton Hotel, located in the district of Retiro and close to Retiro railway station, one of the most important transportation hubs in Buenos Aires.

After numerous changes, in February 2018, the definitive venues plan was presented.

The Opening Ceremony was held at the Obelisco de Buenos Aires.

==== A. Green Park ====
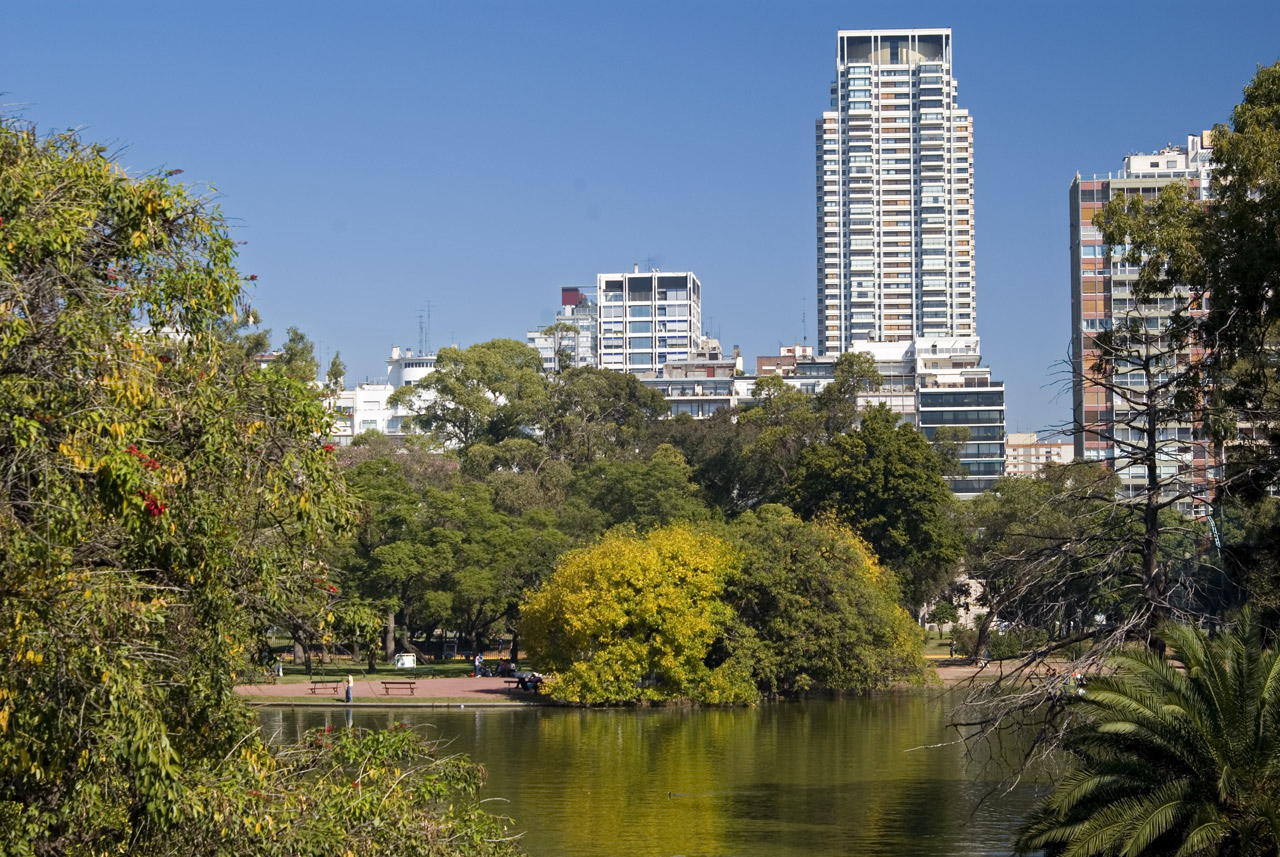
The Palermo Woods hosted the triathlon, beach volley and cycling

Adjacent to downtown Buenos Aires and stretching three kilometres along the scenic banks of the River Plate, this area was distinguished by swathes of parks. It included the barrios of Núñez and Palermo. The Palermo Woods, a highly popular retreat for porteños and visitors alike, was the triathlon and cycling venue.

Venues located in Núñez can be reached by Belgrano Norte Line (at Ciudad Universitaria railway station) or by nearby Mitre Line (at Núñez Station) or Buenos Aires underground Line D (at Congreso de Tucumán Station). Venues located in Palermo can be reached by Mitre Line (Tres de Febrero and Lisandro de la Torre station).

Venue	Location	Sports	Type
Parque Tres de Febrero	Palermo	Triathlon; Cycling (Road / Cross-country); Beach Volley	Existing, no permanent works required
Argentine Equestrian Club	Núñez	Equestrian	Existing, no permanent works required
Buenos Aires Lawn Tennis Club	Palermo	Tennis	Existing, no permanent works required
CeNARD	Núñez	Futsal	Existing, no permanent works required
La Rural	Palermo	International Broadcast Centre	Existing, no permanent works required

==== B. Olympic Park ====
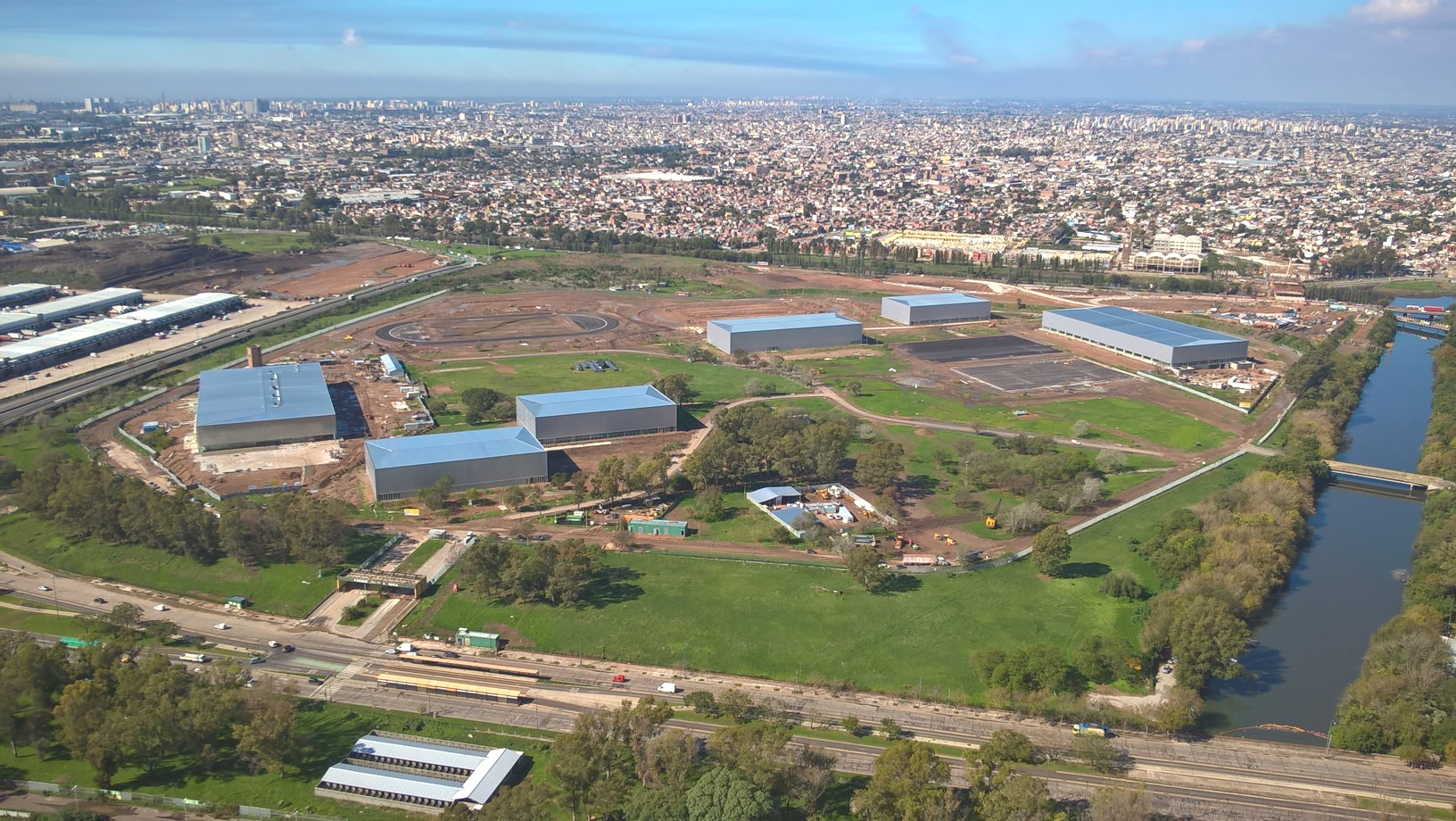
Olympic Park for Buenos Aires 2018 seen from the Space Needle, May 2018.

Located to the South of Buenos Aires, Roca Park is a vast area of 200 hectares in the district of Villa Soldati, a neighborhood that has been targeted by the local Government in need of urban development. One of the greenest areas in the metropolis, it is adjacent to the City Park and the Buenos Aires Automotive Racetrack. The Park, inaugurated in the 1980s, has many sports venues and recreational facilities, including the iconic Roca Park Athletics Stadium and the Roca Park Tennis Stadium. This area was also the site of the Youth Olympic Village (YOV), from where 65 per cent of the athletes were able to walk to their competition venues, and after the event it would become the new location for the CeNARD.

The Parque Polideportivo Roca was fully renovated before the 2018 Summer Youth Olympics in order to be used as main Olympic Park. Six pavilions were built: Asia Pavilion (judo and wrestling), Africa Pavilion (fencing and modern pentathlon), Europe Pavilion (karate and weightlifting), Oceania Pavilion (boxing and taekwondo), America Pavilion (gymnastics) and natatorium. The complex also includes hockey and athletics fields.

Olympic Park can be reached by Premetro tram at Cecilia Grierson station, or by the southern Metrobus line.

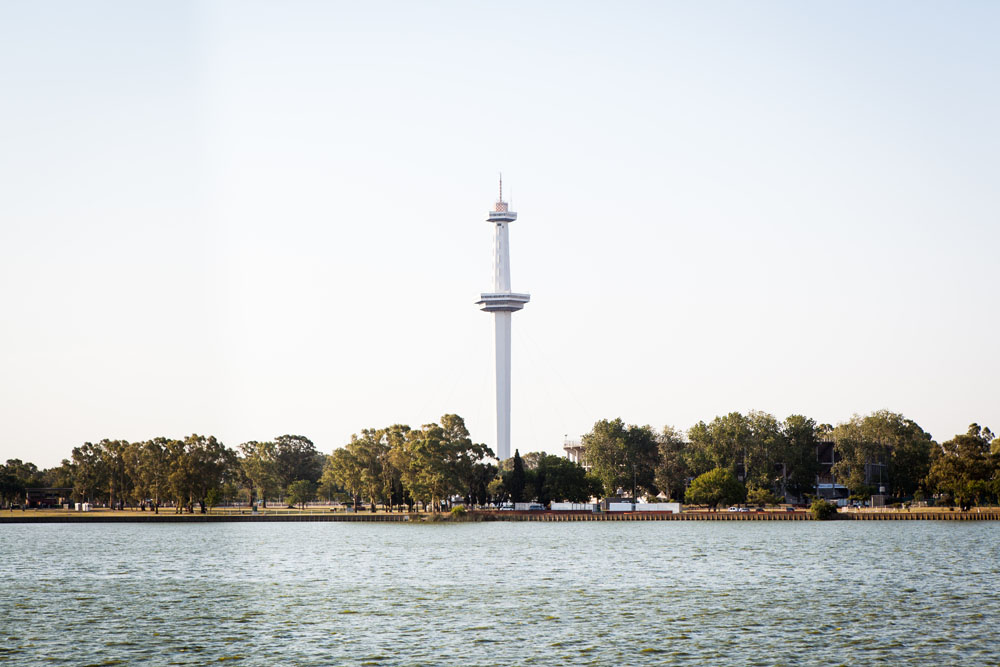
Roca Park is next to the City Park, where the Youth Olympic Village was built, and where the 200 meters high Space Needle is located.

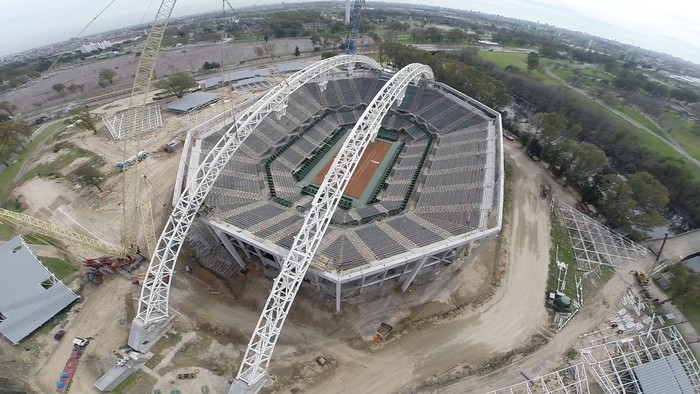
The Roca Park Tennis Stadium was fully covered

Venue	Location	Sports	Type
Roca Park Stadium	Villa Soldati	Training and logistics	Existing, no permanent works required
Youth Olympic Park	Villa Soldati	Athletics	Existing, permanent works required
Youth Olympic Park	Villa Soldati	Aquatics (Swimming;— Diving); Field Hockey; Modern Pentathlon (shooting, running, fencing and swimming); Boxing; Gymnastics (Artistics — Rhythmic — Trampoline); Judo; Taekwondo; Weightlifting; Karate; Wrestling; Fencing	Permanent venue to be built
Youth Olympic Village	Villa Soldati	Closing Ceremony	Permanent venue to be built

==== C. Urban Park ====
Located to the east of the city, this cluster occupies a significant portion of the Río de la Plata riverbank and includes the old Puerto Madero docks as venue for water sports. Rowing competitions were held over 500 metres rather than the usual 2,000 metres.

This area can be reached by Buenos Aires Underground lines A, B, D and E.

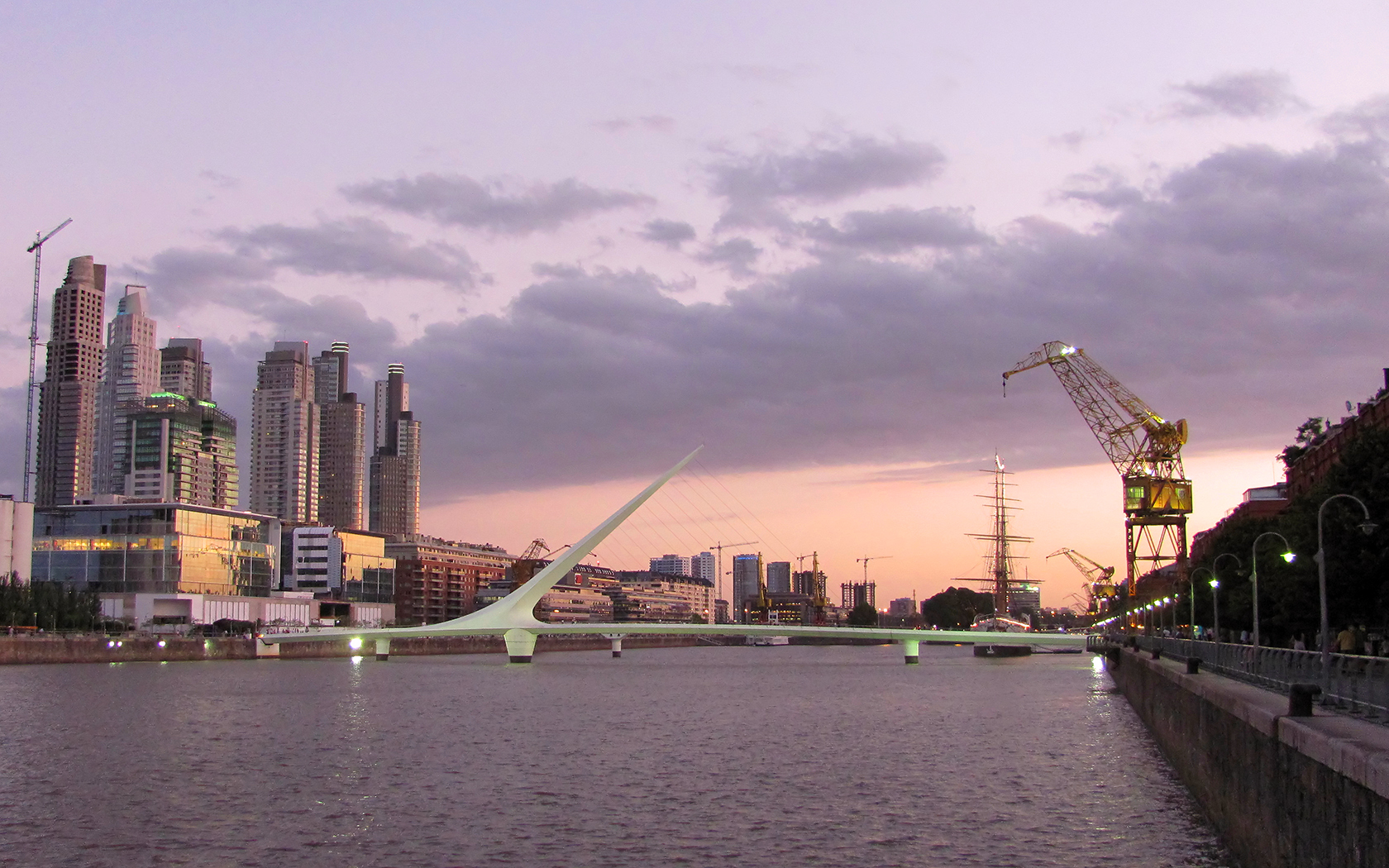
Puerto Madero hosted events of three water sports

Venue	Location	Sports	Type
Dock 3	Puerto Madero	Rowing; Canoeing	Existing, no permanent works required
Parque Mujeres Argentinas	Puerto Madero	Basketball (3 on 3); Cycling (BMX Freestyle); Sport climbing Dancesport	Existing, no permanent works required

==== D. Techno Park ====
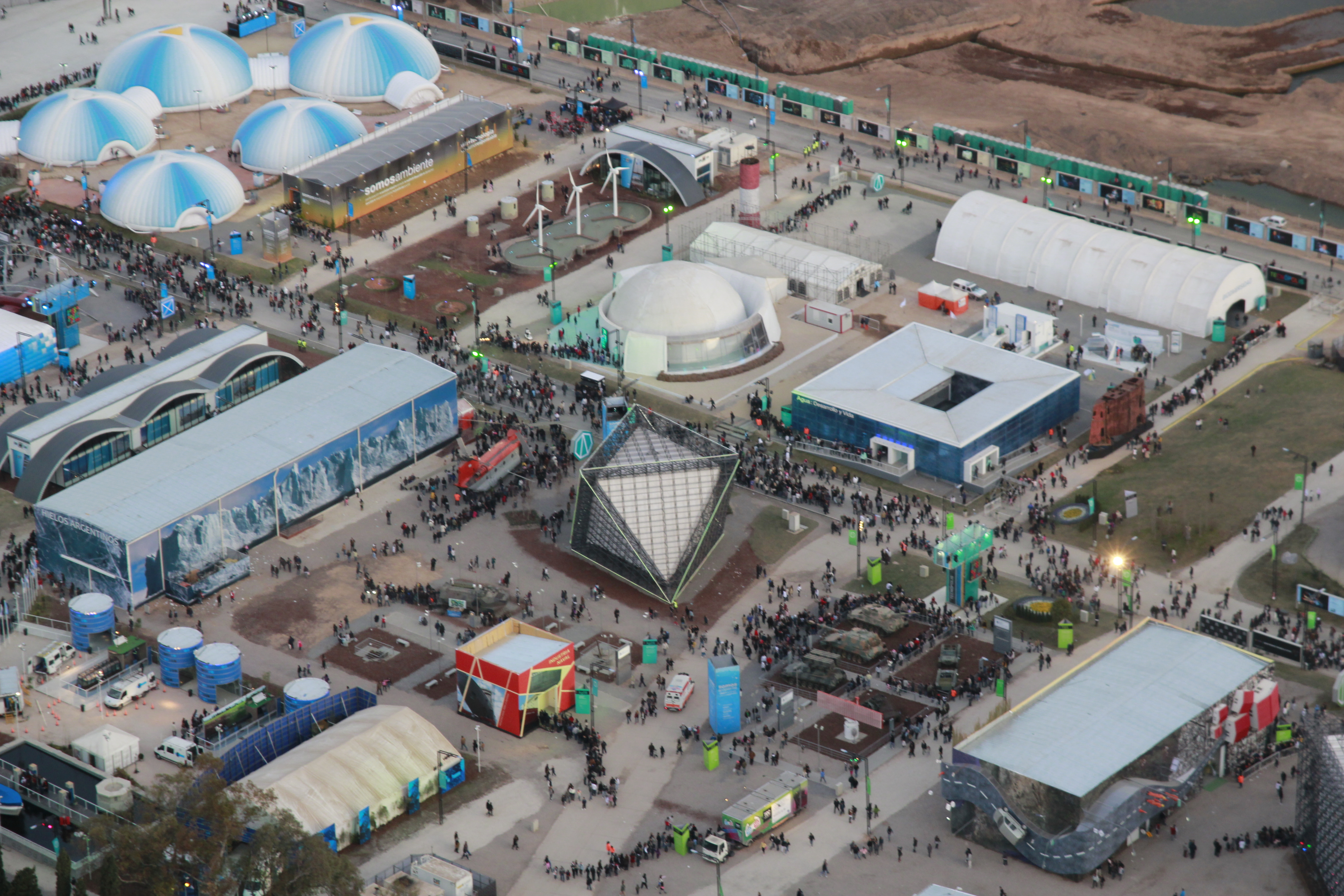
Tecnópolis hosted four sports

Located west of the city and next to the General Paz Avenue which marks the limit of Buenos Aires city, the 50 hectares science, technology, industry and art mega exhibition Tecnópolis was inaugurated in 2011 and was the venue for four sports competitions. This area can be accessed by Mitre Line Railway at Migueletes station or by Belgrano Norte Line at Saavedra or Padilla stations.

Venue	Location	Sports	Type
Tecnópolis	Villa Martelli	Table Tennis; Futsal; Badminton	Existing, no permanent works required
Parque Sarmiento	Saavedra	Shooting; Archery; Beach Handball	Existing, no permanent works required

==== E. Stand-alone venues ====
Venue	Location	Sports	Type
Paseo de la Costa	Vicente López	Cycling (BMX Racing); Roller speed skating	Existing, no permanent works required
Club Náutico San Isidro	San Isidro	Sailing	Existing, no permanent works required
Club Atlético de San Isidro	San Isidro	Rugby sevens	Existing, no permanent works required
Hurlingham Club	Hurlingham	Golf	Existing, no permanent works required

== The Games ==
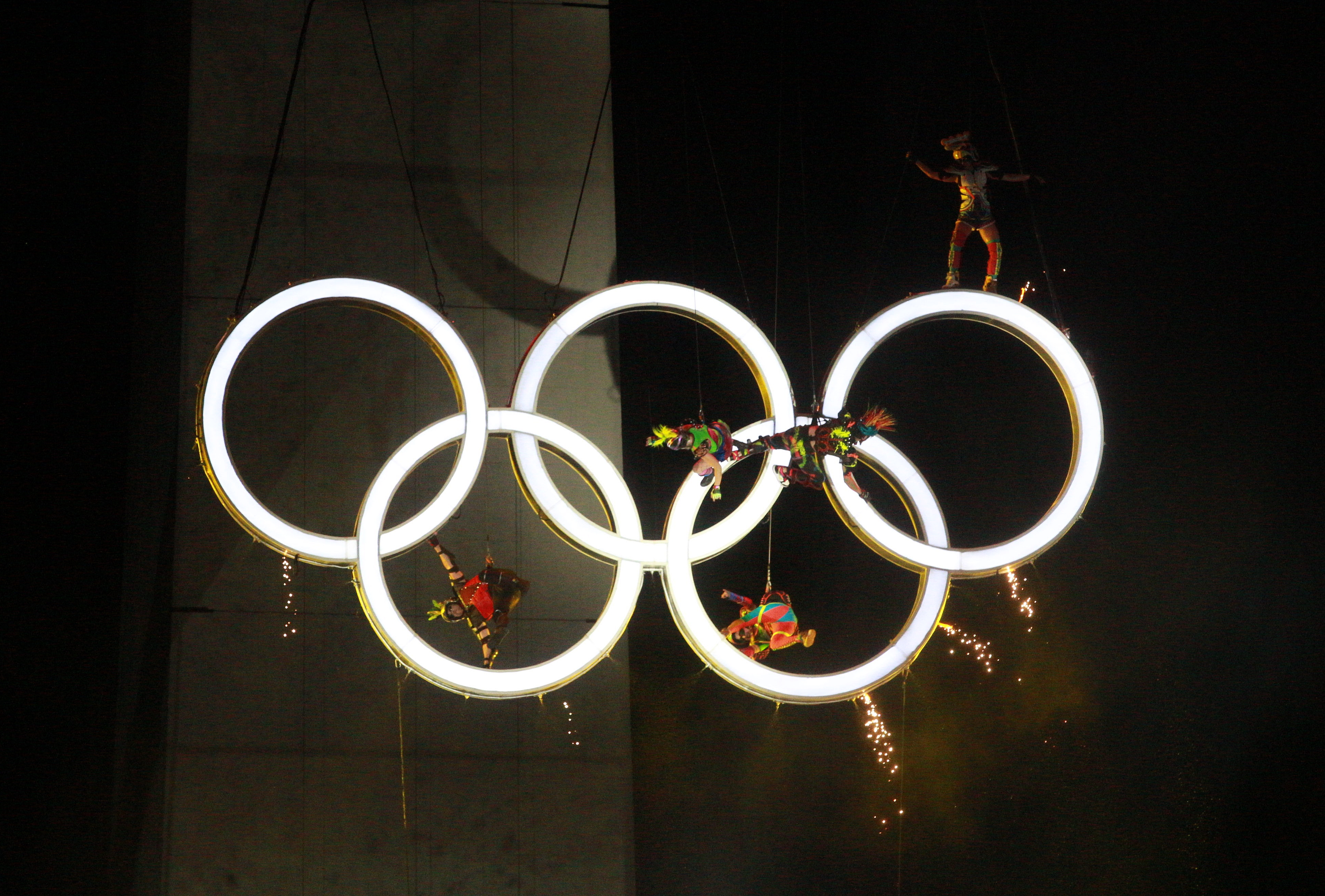
Presentation of the Olympic Rings at the opening ceremony

=== Torch Relay ===
Athens (Greece) - La Plata (Buenos Aires) - Parana (Entre Rios) - Santa Fe (Santa Fe) - Iguazu (Misiones) - Corrientes (Corrientes) - Jujuy (Jujuy) - Salta (Salta) - Tucuman (Tucuman) - Catamarca (Catamarca) - La Rioja (La Rioja) - Mendoza (Mendoza) - San Juan (San Juan) - Cordoba (Cordoba) - Neuquen (Neuquen) - Bariloche (Rio Negro) - Ushuaia (Tierra del Fuego) - Buenos Aires (Federal Capital) (Argentina)

=== Opening ceremony ===
The opening ceremony of the 2018 Summer Youth Olympics was held at the Obelisco de Buenos Aires on 6 October 2018 at 20:00 (8 PM) Argentina Time.

=== Sports ===
The 2018 Summer Youth Olympics featured 239 events in 32 sports. There were 12 mixed team events (Mixed-NOCs), 9 mixed team events (NOCs), 1 open event (Equestrian), 113 men's events, and 102 women's events.

- Aquatics
  - Diving (4+1)
  - Swimming (36)
- Archery (2+1)
- Athletics (36)
- Badminton (2+1)
- Basketball (4)
- Beach handball (2)
- Beach volleyball (2)
- Boxing (13)
- Breakdancing (2+1)
- Canoeing (8)
- Cycling (4)
- Equestrian (1+1)
- Fencing (6+1)
- Field hockey (2)
- Futsal (2)
- Golf (3)
- Gymnastics
  - Acrobatic gymnastics (1)
  - Artistic gymnastics (12+1)
  - Rhythmic gymnastics (1)
  - Trampolining (2)
- Judo (8+1)
- Karate (6)
- Modern pentathlon (2+1)
- Roller speed skating (2)
- Rowing (4)
- Rugby sevens (2)
- Sailing (5)
- Shooting (4+2)
- Sport climbing (2)
- Table tennis (3)
- Taekwondo (10)
- Tennis (5)
- Triathlon (2+1)
- Weightlifting (12)
- Wrestling (15)

=== Participating National Olympic Committees ===
- A total of 206 countries sent at least one athlete to compete in the Games.
- Kosovo and South Sudan made their Youth Olympics debut.
- It was the first participation of Eswatini (formerly known as Swaziland) under its new name in any Olympic event.

Participating National Olympic Committees
- Afghanistan (3)
- Albania (5)
- Algeria (30)
- American Samoa (13)
- Andorra (8)
- Angola (1)
- Antigua and Barbuda (5)
- Argentina (141) (host)
- Armenia (8)
- Aruba (7)
- Australia (88)
- Austria (41)
- Azerbaijan (17)
- Bahamas (7)
- Bahrain (4)
- Bangladesh (13)
- Barbados (4)
- Belarus (37)
- Belgium (32)
- Belize (2)
- Benin (3)
- Bermuda (3)
- Bhutan (3)
- Bolivia (18)
- Bosnia and Herzegovina (6)
- Botswana (3)
- Brazil (79)
- British Virgin Islands (3)
- Brunei (3)
- Bulgaria (24)
- Burkina Faso (4)
- Burundi (5)
- Cambodia (3)
- Cameroon (16)
- Canada (72)
- Cape Verde (3)
- Cayman Islands (3)
- Central African Republic (2)
- Chad (2)
- Chile (44)
- China (82)
- Colombia (53)
- Comoros (3)
- Democratic Republic of the Congo (5)
- Republic of the Congo (2)
- Cook Islands (1)
- Costa Rica (17)
- Croatia (36)
- Cuba (19)
- Cyprus (6)
- Czech Republic (53)
- Denmark (12)
- Djibouti (5)
- Dominica (4)
- Dominican Republic (20)
- Timor-Leste (2)
- Ecuador (29)
- Egypt (68)
- El Salvador (4)
- Equatorial Guinea (3)
- Eritrea (9)
- Estonia (23)
- Eswatini (3)
- Ethiopia (11)
- Fiji (3)
- Finland (25)
- France (99)
- Gabon (4)
- The Gambia (5)
- Georgia (15)
- Germany (75)
- Ghana (5)
- Great Britain (43)
- Greece (33)
- Grenada (4)
- Guam (4)
- Guatemala (9)
- Guinea (3)
- Guinea-Bissau (2)
- Guyana (4)
- Haiti (3)
- Honduras (4)
- Hong Kong (25)
- Hungary (79)
- Iceland (9)
- India (46)
- Indonesia (17)
- Iran (49)
- Iraq (15)
- Ireland (17)
- Israel (19)
- Italy (83)
- Ivory Coast (3)
- Jamaica (12)
- Japan (91)
- Jordan (12)
- Kazakhstan (58)
- Kenya (19)
- Kiribati (2)
- Kosovo (5)
- Kuwait (2)
- Kyrgyzstan (13)
- Laos (4)
- Latvia (19)
- Lebanon (3)
- Lesotho (2)
- Liberia (2)
- Libya (2)
- Liechtenstein (3)
- Lithuania (15)
- Luxembourg (10)
- Macedonia (6)
- Madagascar (4)
- Malawi (4)
- Malaysia (20)
- Maldives (3)
- Mali (3)
- Malta (4)
- Marshall Islands (5)
- Mauritania (2)
- Mauritius (25)
- Mexico (93)
- Federated States of Micronesia (3)
- Moldova (17)
- Monaco (5)
- Mongolia (11)
- Montenegro (2)
- Morocco (20)
- Mozambique (6)
- Myanmar (2)
- Namibia (11)
- Nauru (5)
- Nepal (3)
- Netherlands (41)
- New Zealand (61)
- Nicaragua (4)
- Niger (3)
- Nigeria (17)
- North Korea (5)
- Norway (16)
- Oman (5)
- Pakistan (3)
- Palau (2)
- Palestine (4)
- Panama (16)
- Papua New Guinea (4)
- Paraguay (26)
- Peru (16)
- Philippines (7)
- Poland (71)
- Portugal (41)
- Puerto Rico (22)
- Qatar (5)
- Romania (34)
- Russia (93)
- Rwanda (3)
- Saint Kitts and Nevis (2)
- Saint Lucia (3)
- Saint Vincent and the Grenadines (6)
- Samoa (17)
- San Marino (4)
- São Tomé and Príncipe (4)
- Saudi Arabia (9)
- Senegal (4)
- Serbia (16)
- Seychelles (3)
- Sierra Leone (4)
- Singapore (18)
- Slovakia (33)
- Slovenia (26)
- Solomon Islands (12)
- Somalia (2)
- South Africa (70)
- South Korea (28)
- Spain (85)
- Sri Lanka (13)
- Sudan (2)
- South Sudan (3)
- Suriname (3)
- Sweden (18)
- Switzerland (41)
- Syria (3)
- Chinese Taipei (59)
- Tajikistan (3)
- Thailand (57)
- Tanzania (4)
- Togo (4)
- Tonga (12)
- Trinidad and Tobago (14)
- Tunisia (38)
- Turkey (56)
- Turkmenistan (10)
- Tuvalu (1)
- Uganda (5)
- Ukraine (55)
- United Arab Emirates (8)
- United States (86)
- Uruguay (26)
- Uzbekistan (37)
- Vanuatu (21)
- Venezuela (53)
- Vietnam (13)
- Virgin Islands (4)
- Yemen (3)
- Zambia (14)
- Zimbabwe (15)

==== Number of athletes by National Olympic Committee ====
IOC Letter Code	Country	Athletes
ARG	Argentina	141
FRA	France	99
MEX	Mexico	93
RUS	Russia	93
JPN	Japan	91
AUS	Australia	88
USA	United States	86
ESP	Spain	85
ITA	Italy	83
CHN	China	82
BRA	Brazil	79
HUN	Hungary	79
GER	Germany	75
CAN	Canada	72
RSA	South Africa	70
EGY	Egypt	68
TPE	Chinese Taipei	58
KAZ	Kazakhstan	58
THA	Thailand	57
TUR	Turkey	56
UKR	Ukraine	55
COL	Colombia	53
CZE	Czech Republic	53
VEN	Venezuela	53
IRI	Iran	49
IND	India	47
CHI	Chile	44
GBR	Great Britain	43
AUT	Austria	41
SUI	Switzerland	41
TUN	Tunisia	38
BLR	Belarus	37
UZB	Uzbekistan	37
CRO	Croatia	36
GRE	Greece	33
SVK	Slovakia	33
BEL	Belgium	32
ALG	Algeria	30
DOM	Dominican Republic	30
ECU	Ecuador	29
KOR	South Korea	28
URU	Uruguay	26
SLO	Slovenia	26
FIN	Finland	25
HKG	Hong Kong	25
MRI	Mauritius	25
BUL	Bulgaria	24
EST	Estonia	23
VAN	Vanuatu	21
MAS	Malaysia	20
MAR	Morocco	20
CUB	Cuba	19
ISR	Israel	19
KEN	Kenya	19
LAT	Latvia	19
BOL	Bolivia	18
SGP	Singapore	18
SWE	Sweden	18
AZE	Azerbaijan	17
CRC	Costa Rica	17
INA	Indonesia	17
IRL	Ireland	17
MDA	Moldova	17
CAM	Cambodia	16
SRB	Serbia	16
GEO	Georgia	15
IRQ	Iraq	15
LTU	Lithuania	15
ZIM	Zimbabwe	15
ZAM	Zambia	15
TTO	Trinidad and Tobago	14
ASA	American Samoa	13
BAN	Bangladesh	13
KGZ	Kyrgyzstan	13
SRI	Sri Lanka	13
VIE	Vietnam	13
DEN	Denmark	12
JAM	Jamaica	12
JOR	Jordan	12
TGA	Tonga	12
SOL	Solomon Islands	12
ETH	Ethiopia	11
MGL	Mongolia	11
NAM	Namibia	11
LUX	Luxembourg	10
TKM	Turkmenistan	10
ERI	Eritrea	9
GUA	Guatemala	9
ISL	Iceland	9
KSA	Saudi Arabia	9
AND	Andorra	8
ARM	Armenia	8
UAE	United Arab Emirates	8
ARU	Aruba	7
BAH	Bahamas	7
PHI	Philippines	7
BIH	Bosnia and Herzegovina	6
MOZ	Mozambique	6
CYP	Cyprus	6
ANT	Antigua and Barbuda	5
BDI	Burundi	5
COD	Democratic Republic of the Congo	5
DJI	Djibouti	5
GAM	The Gambia	5
GHA	Ghana	5
KOS	Kosovo	5
MHL	Marshall Islands	5
UGA	Uganda	5
MKD	Macedonia	5
MON	Monaco	5
PRK	North Korea	5
BRN	Bahrain	4
BAR	Barbados	4
BUR	Burkina Faso	4
DMA	Dominica	4
ESA	El Salvador	4
GAB	Gabon	4
GRN	Grenada	4
GUM	Guam	4
GUY	Guyana	4
HON	Honduras	4
LAO	Laos	4
MAD	Madagascar	4
MAW	Malawi	4
MLT	Malta	4
SMR	San Marino	4
STP	São Tomé and Príncipe	4
SEN	Senegal	4
SLE	Sierra Leone	4
TAN	Tanzania	4
TOG	Togo	4
ISV	Virgin Islands	4
AFG	Afghanistan	3
BEN	Benin	3
BER	Bermuda	3
BHU	Bhutan	3
BOT	Botswana	3
IVB	British Virgin Islands	3
BRU	Brunei	3
CAM	Cambodia	3
CPV	Cape Verde	3
CAY	Cayman Islands	3
COM	Comoros	3
GEQ	Equatorial Guinea	3
FIJ	Fiji	3
GUI	Guinea	3
HAI	Haiti	3
CIV	Ivory Coast	3
LBN	Lebanon	3
LIE	Liechtenstein	3
MDV	Maldives	3
MLI	Mali	3
FSM	Federated States of Micronesia	3
SEY	Seychelles	3
SYR	Syria	3
TJK	Tajikistan	3
YEM	Yemen	3
BIZ	Belize	2
CAF	Central African Republic	2
CHA	Chad	2
CGO	Republic of the Congo	2
TLS	Timor-Leste	2
GBS	Guinea-Bissau	2
KIR	Kiribati	2
KUW	Kuwait	2
LES	Lesotho	2
LBR	Liberia	2
LBA	Libya	2
MTN	Mauritania	2
MNE	Montenegro	2
MYA	Myanmar	2
SOM	Somalia	2
SUD	Sudan	2
SSD	South Sudan	2
SUR	Suriname	2
SWZ	Eswatini	2
ANG	Angola	1
COK	Cook Islands	1
TUV	Tuvalu	1

=== Schedule ===
The schedule for the 2018 Summer Youth Olympic Games was released on 9 May 2018, exactly 150 days before the starting of the games on its official website.

●	Opening ceremony	●	Event competitions	●	Event finals	●	Closing ceremony

October	6th Sat	7th Sun	8th Mon	9th Tue	10th Wed	11th Thu	12th Fri	13th Sat	14th Sun	15th Mon	16th Tue	17th Wed	18th Thu	Events
Ceremonies	●												●	
Aquatics (Diving)								1	1	1	1	1		5
Aquatics (Swimming)		3	8	5	7	4	9							36
Archery							●	●	1	●	1	1		3
Athletics						●	●	●	9	16	11			36
Badminton		●	●	●	●	●	3							3
Basketball		●	●	●	●	●	●	●	●	2	●	2		4
Beach handball			●	●	●	●	●	2						2
Beach volleyball		●	●	●	●	●	●	●	●	●	●	2		2
Boxing									●	●	●	8	5	13
Canoeing							2	2		2	2			8
Cycling		1			●	1		●	●	●	●	2		4
Dancesport		●	2		●	1								3
Equestrian			●	1			●	1						2
Fencing		2	2	2	1									7
Field hockey		●	●	●	●	●	●	●	2					2
Futsal		●	●	●	●	●	●	●		●		1	1	2
Golf				●	●	2		●	●	1				3
Gymnastics		●	●	●	1	1	1	4	4	5	1			17
Judo		3	3	2	1									9
Karate												3	3	6
Modern pentathlon							●	1	1	●	1			3
Roller speed skating		●	2											2
Rowing		●	●	2	2									4
Rugby sevens								●	●	2				2
Sailing		●	●	●	●	●	2	3						5
Shooting		1	1	1	1	1	1							6
Sport climbing		●	●	1	1									2
Table tennis		●	●	●	2		●	●	●	1				3
Taekwondo		2	2	2	2	2								10
Tennis		●	●	●	●	●	●	2	3					5
Triathlon		1	1			1								3
Weightlifting		2	2	2		2	2	2						12
Wrestling							5	5	5					15
Total gold medals		15	23	18	18	15	25	23	26	30	17	20	9	239
Cumulative gold medals		15	38	56	74	89	114	137	163	193	210	230	239	239
October	6th Sat	7th Sun	8th Mon	9th Tue	10th Wed	11th Thu	12th Fri	13th Sat	14th Sun	15th Mon	16th Tue	17th Wed	18th Thu	Events

=== Closing ceremony ===
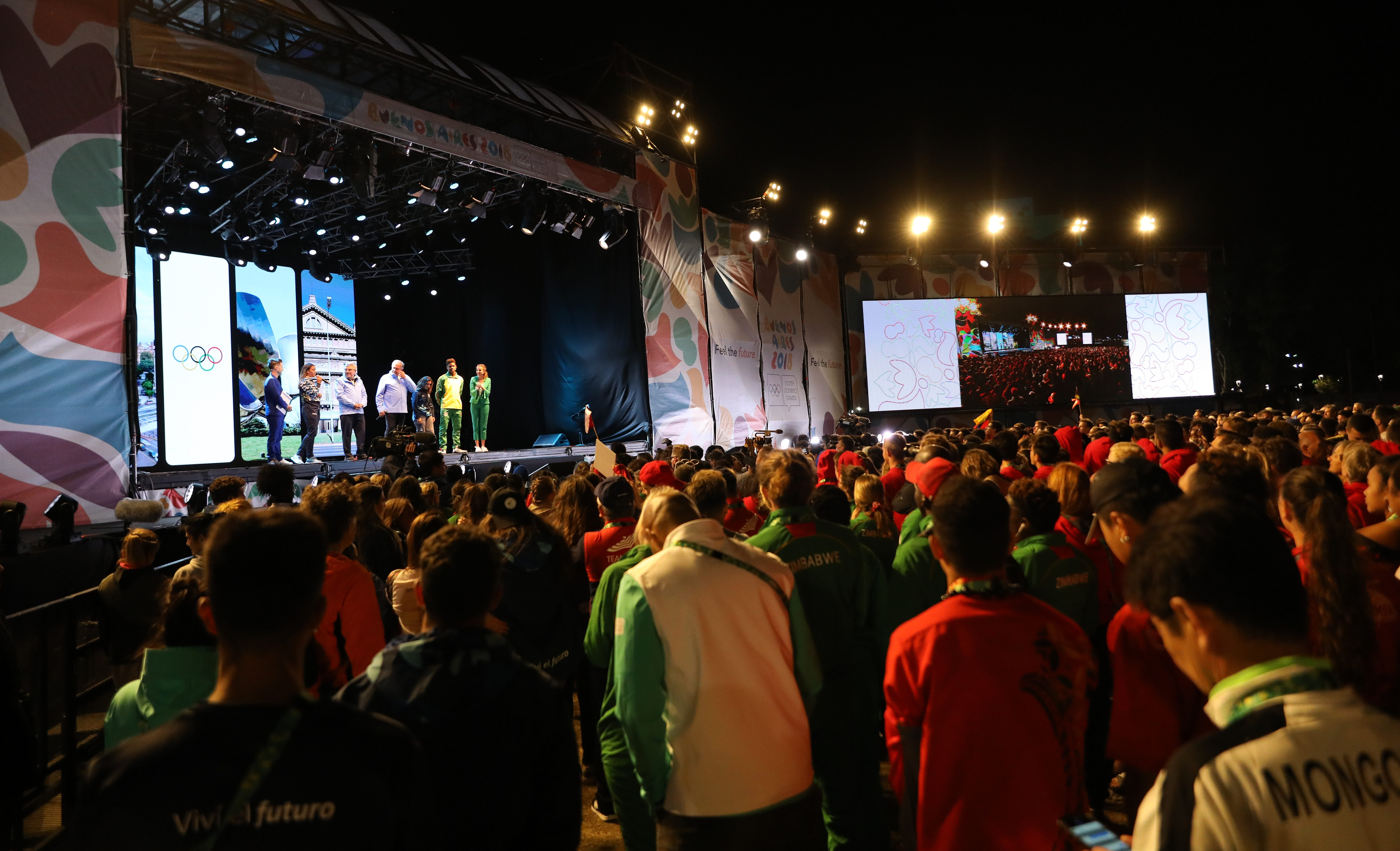
Athletes and sports functionaries watching the closing ceremony

The closing ceremony of the 2018 Summer Youth Olympics was held at the Youth Olympic Village on 18 October 2018. The Olympic flag was handed over to the next host city, Senegalese capital Dakar, for the 2026 Summer Youth Olympics.

=== Doping ===
Supatchanin Khamhaeng of Thailand originally won the gold medal at the Girls' +63 kg Weightlifting event, but was disqualified in 2019 after testing positive for a banned substance.

== Medal table ==
* Host nation (Argentina)

Rank	Nation	Gold	Silver	Bronze	Total
1	Russia	29	18	12	59
2	China	18	9	9	36
3	Japan	15	12	12	39
–	Mixed-NOCs	13	13	13	39
4	Hungary	12	7	5	24
5	Italy	11	10	13	34
6	Argentina*	11	6	9	26
7	Iran	7	3	4	14
8	United States	6	5	7	18
9	France	5	15	7	27
10	Ukraine	5	7	6	18
11–93	Remaining	108	136	166	410
Totals (93 entries)		240	241	263	744

Source: IOC

== Marketing ==
=== Emblem ===
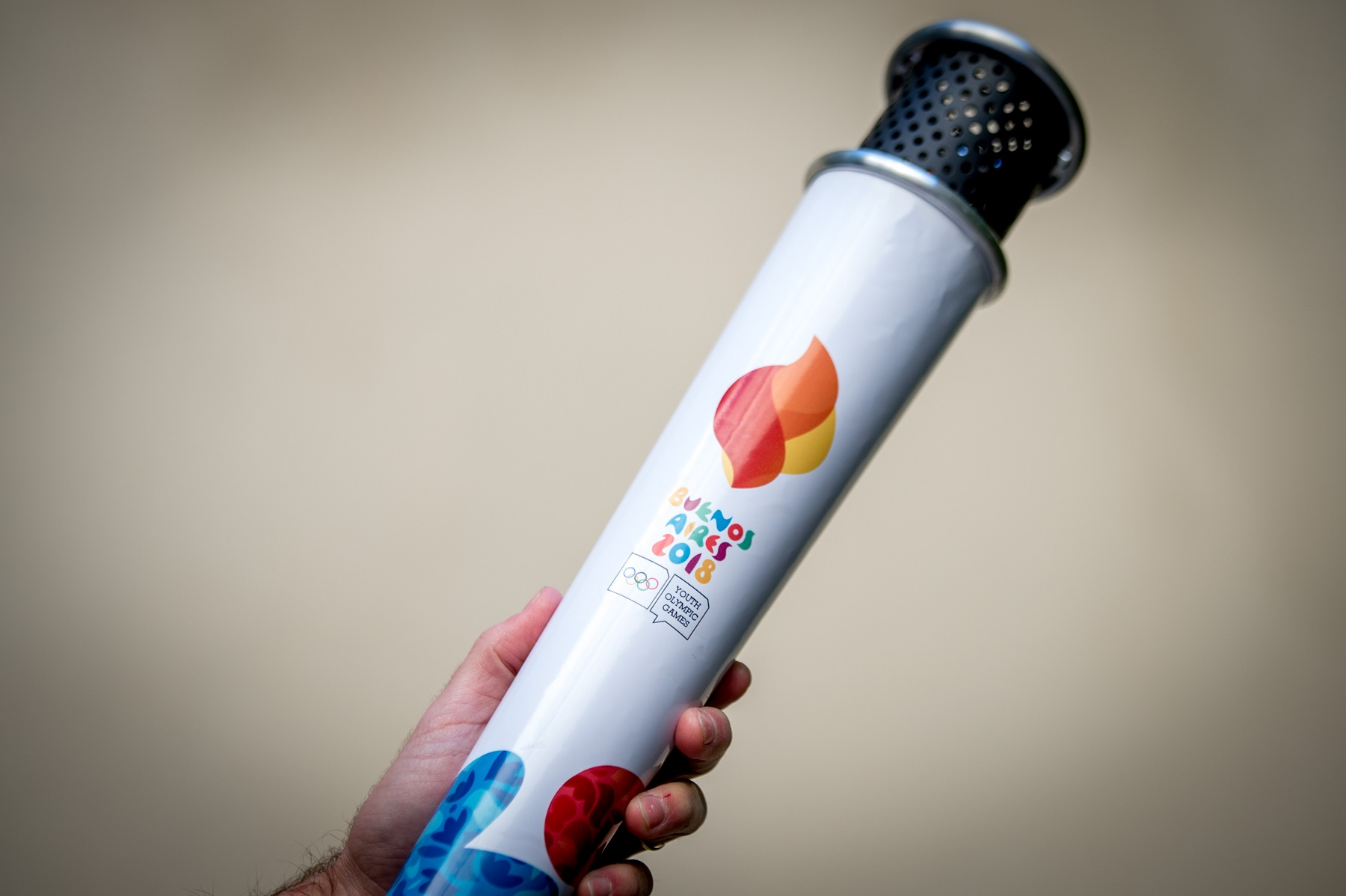
Olympic Torch with emblem

The official emblem of the 2018 Summer Youth Olympics was presented in July 2015, three years before the games. The emblem reflects the diversity of Buenos Aires and it is inspired by the city's vibrant colours, eclectic culture, iconic architecture and the many neighbourhoods that make up the Argentine capital. Each letter represents a famous landmark, including the Floralis Genérica, Space Tower, the Columbus Theatre, the National Library and the Obelisk. A short video produced by the Buenos Aires Youth Olympic Games Organising Committee (BAYOGOC) shows what each letter on the emblem relates to.

=== Slogan ===
The slogan of these Games,"Feel the Future", was unveiled on 8 April 2018.

=== Mascot ===
Pandi

Mascot of the 2018 Summer Youth Olympics (Buenos Aires)
- Creator: Human Full Agency
- Significance: A young Jaguar

The Olympic mascot of these games was unveiled on 29 May 2018. The mascot is a young Jaguar, its name "Pandi" is a combination of the scientific name of the species (Panthera onca) and the relationship of the mascot with the "digital world". The president of the Buenos Aires 2018 Organising Committee, Gerardo Werthein, said that the mascot "seeks to inspire young people on the transformative power of Olympism and sport".

The mascot was created by the Argentine agency Human Full Agency with direction of Peta Rivero y Hornos. The animation short was made by the local production company Buda TV.

=== Official song ===
The official song of Buenos Aires 2018 is "Alive", performed by Candelaria Molfese and Fernando Dente. It was produced by Radio Disney. The name of the song in Spanish is "Vamos juntos" ("Let's go together"), which was also the name of the governing coalition for the 2017 legislative elections in Buenos Aires city.

== Legacy ==
The Olympic Park was renovated, and after the Games, the Oceania Pavilion became the Home of Argentine Handball, a 5,000-seat stadium that hosted, among other competitions, the 2024 South and Central American Men's Handball Championship; the Asia Pavilion became the Home of Volleyball, with a capacity of 1,000 spectators; the Europe Pavilion became a high-performance skating center; while the Africa and Americas Pavilions are used for general sports training, particularly for contact sports. A new climbing wall, a hotel for 200 guests, and a Sports Science Clinic were also built on the grounds. In 2025, the headquarters of the University Institute of Security (IUSE) was inaugurated on the same site.

The Youth Olympic Village became the Olympic Neighborhood, a new district that, as of 2026, has approximately 3,400 residents. The Buenos Aires City government aims to expand the neighborhood to reach 10,000 inhabitants.

== See also ==
- 1951 Pan American Games
- 2006 South American Games
- 125th IOC Session
- 133rd IOC Session

Preceded by Nanjing	Summer Youth Olympic Games; Buenos Aires; III Youth Olympiad (2018)	Succeeded by Dakar
