= Argentina at the 2018 Summer Youth Olympics =

- IOC code: ARG
- NOC: Argentine Olympic Committee
- Website: www.coarg.org.ar (in Spanish)

in Buenos Aires
- Competitors: 141 in 32 sports
- Flag bearer: Dante Cittadini (opening) María Sol Ordás (closing)
- Medals Ranked 6th: Gold 11 Silver 6 Bronze 9 Total 26

Summer Youth Olympics appearances (overview)
- 2010; 2014; 2018; 2026

Argentina competed at the 2018 Summer Youth Olympics in Buenos Aires, Argentina from 6 October to 18 October 2018, as host nation.

== Medalists ==
Medals awarded to participants of mixed-NOC teams are represented in italics. These medals are not counted towards the individual NOC medal tally.

Medal	Name	Sport	Event	Date
Gold	María Sol Ordás	Rowing	Girls' single sculls	10 October
Gold	Iñaki Iriartes; Agustina Roth	Cycling	Mixed BMX freestyle park	11 October
Gold	Belén Aizen; Lucila Balsas; Caterina Benedetti; Gisella Bonomi; Fiorella Corimberto; Carolina Ponce; Jimena Riadigos; Rosario Soto; Zoe Turnes	Beach handball	Girls' tournament	13 October
Gold	Dante Cittadini; Teresa Romairone	Sailing	Nacra 15	13 October
Gold	Brisa Bruggesser; María Cerúndolo; Celina di Santo; Azul Iritxity; Miranda Victoria; Gianella Palet; Lourdes Pérez; Sofía Ramallo; Josefina Rubenacker	Field hockey	Girls' tournament	14 October
Gold	Facundo Díaz Acosta; Sebastián Báez	Tennis	Boys' doubles	14 October
Gold	Nazareno Sasia	Athletics	Boys' shot put	15 October
Gold	Fausto Ruesga	Basketball	Boys' dunk contest	15 October
Gold	Lucio Cinti Luna; Ramiro Costa; Marcos Elicagaray; Juan González; Matteo Graziano; Julián Hernández; Ignacio Mendy; Marcos Moneta; Bautista Pedemonte; Julián Quetglas; Nicolás Roger; Tomás Vanni	Rugby Sevens	Boys' tournament	15 October
Gold	Juan Esteban de la Fuente; Marco Giordano Gnass; Juan Santiago Hierrezuelo; Fausto Ruesga	Basketball	Boys' tournament	17 October
Gold	Brian Arregui	Boxing	Boys' 69 kg	17 October
Silver	Delfina Pignatiello	Swimming	Girls' 800 m freestyle	9 October
Silver	Broly	Dancesport	Breaking mixed team	11 October
Silver	Fernando Martín Espíndola	Gymnastics	Mixed multi-discipline team	11 October
Silver	Delfina Pignatiello	Swimming	Girls' 400 m freestyle	12 October
Silver	Facundo Díaz Acosta	Tennis	Boys' singles	13 October
Silver	Linda Machuca	Wrestling	Girls' freestyle 73 kg	13 October
Silver	Hernán David Almendra	Wrestling	Boys' freestyle 55 kg	14 October
Silver	Agustina Giannasio	Archery	Mixed team	14 October
Silver	Agustín Osorio	Athletics	Boys' javelin throw	16 October
Silver	Franco Serrano	Modern pentathlon	Mixed relay	16 October
Bronze	Felipe Modarelli; Tomás Herrera	Rowing	Boys' pair sculls	9 October
Bronze	Facundo Firmapaz	Shooting	Mixed 10 metre air rifle	11 October
Bronze	Santiago Scallier	Gymnastics	Mixed multi-discipline team	11 October
Bronze	Nahuel Baptista; José Basualdo; Francisco Daudinot; Nicolás Dieguez; Elian Jesús Goux; Nicolás Millet; Alejo Novillo; Tomás Páez Alarcón; Julián Santos	Beach hanbdall	Boys' tournament	13 October
Bronze	Valentín Rossi	Canoeing	Boys' K1 sprint	13 October
Bronze	Agustín Cabana; Gaspar Garrone; Nehuén Hernando; Ignacio Ibarra; Tadeo Marcucci; Santiago Micaz; Facundo Sarto; Lisandro Zago; Facundo Zárate	Field hockey	Boys' tournament	14 October
Bronze	Sofía Acevedo	Basketball	Girls' shoot-out contest	15 October
Bronze	Ela Anacona; Mateo Fernández de Oliveira	Golf	Mixed team	15 October
Bronze	Juan Bautista Amieva; Mauro Zelayeta	Beach volleyball	Boys' tournament	17 October
Bronze	Mirco Cuello	Boxing	Boys' 56 kg	18 October
Bronze	Oriana Saputo	Boxing	Girls' 60 kg	18 October

Medals by sport
Sport	1st place, gold medalist(s)	2nd place, silver medalist(s)	3rd place, bronze medalist(s)	Total
Basketball	2	0	1	3
Athletics	1	1	0	2
Tennis	1	1	0	2
Boxing	1	0	2	3
Beach handball	1	0	1	2
Field hockey	1	0	1	2
Rowing	1	0	1	2
Cycling	1	0	0	1
Rugby Sevens	1	0	0	1
Sailing	1	0	0	1
Swimming	0	2	0	2
Wrestling	0	2	0	2
Beach volleyball	0	0	1	1
Canoeing	0	0	1	1
Golf	0	0	1	1
Total	11	6	9	26

Medals by date
Day	Date	1st place, gold medalist(s)	2nd place, silver medalist(s)	3rd place, bronze medalist(s)	Total
Day 1	7 October	0	0	0	0
Day 2	8 October	0	0	0	0
Day 3	9 October	0	1	1	2
Day 4	10 October	1	0	0	1
Day 5	11 October	1	0	0	1
Day 6	12 October	0	1	0	1
Day 7	13 October	2	2	2	6
Day 8	14 October	2	1	1	4
Day 9	15 October	3	0	2	5
Day 10	16 October	0	1	0	1
Day 11	17 October	2	0	1	3
Day 12	18 October	0	0	2	2
Total		11	6	9	26

== Competitors ==
Sport	Boys	Girls	Total
Archery	0	1	1
Athletics	7	0	7
Badminton	1	0	1
Basketball	4	4	8
Beach handball	9	9	18
Beach volleyball	2	2	4
Boxing	2	1	3
Canoeing	2	1	3
Cycling	3	3	6
Dancesport	1	1	2
Equestrian	1	0	1
Fencing	2	0	2
Futsal	10	0	10
Golf	1	1	2
Gymnastics	4	4	8
Field hockey	9	9	18
Judo	1	1	2
Karate	2	0	2
Modern pentathlon	1	1	2
Roller speed skating	1	1	2
Rowing	2	1	3
Rugby sevens	12	0	12
Sailing	3	3	6
Shooting	1	1	2
Sport climbing	0	1	1
Swimming	2	4	6
Table tennis	2	0	2
Taekwondo	2	1	3
Tennis	2	1	3
Triathlon	0	1	1
Weightlifting	1	1	2
Wrestling	2	1	3
Total	92	54	146

== Archery ==
Argentina qualified two athletes based on host nation.

- Boys' Individual - 1 quota
- Girls' Individual - 1 quota

Athlete	Event	Ranking round		Round of 32	Round of 16	Quarterfinals	Semifinals	Final / BM	
Athlete	Event	Score	Seed	Opposition Score	Opposition Score	Opposition Score	Opposition Score	Opposition Score	Rank
Agustina Giannasio	Girls' individual	630	21	Touraine-Helias (FRA); L 3–8	Did not advance				
Agustina Giannasio; Aitthiwat Soithong (THA)	Mixed team	1299	16	Paeglis (AUS); Tolba (EGY); W 6–2	Amr Said Mohamed Azzam (EGY); Potrafke (GER); W 5–4	Satır (TUR); Akash (IND); W 6–0	Jones (NZL); Tang (TPE); W 6–0	Touraine-Helias (FRA); Solera (ESP); L 1–5	2nd place, silver medalist(s)

== Athletics ==
As hosts, Argentina was given four athlete quotas (2 boys and 2 girls) to compete in athletics.

- Boys' events - 2 athletes
- Girls' events - 2 athletes

But finally these 7 athletes, based on Panamerican rankings, are selected: Nazareno Sassia (SP), Pablo Zaffaroni (PV), Gustavo Agustín Osorio (JT), Pedro Garrido (400 m hs), Julio Nobile (HT), Luciano Méndez (TJ) and Lázaro Bonora (DT), only boys.

Boys
Track and road events

Athlete	Event	Stage 1		Stage 2		Total	
Athlete	Event	Result	Rank	Result	Rank	Total	Rank
Pedro Garrido	Boys' 400 m hurdles	52.22	4	54.56	7	1:46.78	6

Field events

Athlete	Event	Stage 1		Stage 2		Total	
Athlete	Event	Result	Rank	Result	Rank	Total	Rank
Pablo Zaffaroni	Pole vault	0	14	4.92	5	4.92	14
Luciano Mendez	Triple jump	14.87	14	14.62	12	29.49	13
Nazareno Sasia	Shot put	21.94	1	21.25	1	43.19	1st place, gold medalist(s)
Lazaro Bonora	Discus throw	55.01	5	56.36	9	111.37	7
Julio Nobile	Hammer throw	71.22	7	69.21	9	140.43	8
Gustavo Agustin Osorio	Javelin throw	76.03	2	74.25	5	150.28	2nd place, silver medalist(s)

== Badminton ==
As hosts, Argentina was given a spot to compete in the boys' and girls' singles events. Argentina only sent 1 boy.

Singles

Athlete	Event	Group stage				Quarterfinal	Semifinal	Final / BM	Rank
Athlete	Event	Opposition Score	Opposition Score	Opposition Score	Rank	Opposition Score	Opposition Score	Opposition Score	Rank
Mateo Delmastro	Boys' Singles	Canjura (ESA); L 0–2	Nguyen (IRL); L 0–2	Keoxay (LAO); L 1–2	4	did not advance			9

Team

Athlete	Event	Group stage				Quarterfinal	Semifinal	Final / BM	Rank
Athlete	Event	Opposition Score	Opposition Score	Opposition Score	Rank	Opposition Score	Opposition Score	Opposition Score	Rank
Team Delta; Mateo Delmastro (ARG); Arnaud Merklé (FRA); Dmitriy Panarin (KAZ); Balázs Pápai (HUN); Elena Andreu (ESP); Pattarasuda Chaiwan (THA); Madouc Linders (NED); Petra Polanc (SLO)	Mixed Teams	Zeta (MIX); W (110–95)	Alpha (MIX); W (110–99)	Epsilon (MIX); L (108–110)	1Q	Theta (MIX); L (93–110)	Did not advance		5

== Basketball ==
As hosts, Argentina is given a spot to compete in both the boys' and girls' tournaments.

- Boys' Tournament - 1 team of 4 athletes
- Girls' Tournament - 1 team of 4 athletes

Event	Group stage					Quarterfinal	Semifinal	Final / BM	
Event	Opposition Score	Opposition Score	Opposition Score	Opposition Score	Rank	Opposition Score	Opposition Score	Opposition Score	Rank
Boys' tournament	Estonia; W 22–19	Russia; W 21–14	Mongolia; W 22–15	United States; L 18–21	1 Q	Georgia; W 21–12	Ukraine; W 18–16	Belgium; W 20–15	1st place, gold medalist(s)
Girls' tournament	Indonesia; W 22–11	France; W 18–13	Mexico; W 20–15	Andorra; W 21–5	1 Q	China; L 17–19	Did not advance		

Shoot-out contest

Athlete	Event	Qualification		Final					
Athlete	Event	Points	Rank	Round 1	Round 2	Round 3	Round 4	Total	Rank
Sofía Acevedo	Shoot-out contest	9	1 Q	4	2	2	0	8	3rd place, bronze medalist(s)
Florencia Chagas	Shoot-out contest	3	19	Did not advance					

Dunk contest

Athlete	Event	Qualification				Semifinal				Final				
Athlete	Event	Round 1	Round 2	Total	Rank	Round 1	Round 2	Total	Rank	Round 1	Round 2	Round 3	Total	Rank
Fausto Ruesga	Dunk contest	24	27	51	1 Q	24	27	51	2 Q	27	26	28	81	1st place, gold medalist(s)

== Beach handball ==
As hosts, Argentina were given a spot to compete in the boys' and girls' tournament.

Event	Preliminary round						Main round / Consolidation round				Semifinal	Final / BM / PM	
Event	Opposition Score	Opposition Score	Opposition Score	Opposition Score	Opposition Score	Rank	Opposition Score	Opposition Score	Opposition Score	Rank	Opposition Score	Opposition Score	Rank
Boys' tournament	Croatia; W 2-1	Paraguay; W 2–0	Portugal; W 2–1	Mauritius; W 2–1	Italy; W 2–1	1	Thailand; L 1–2	Spain; L 0–2	Hungary; W 2–0	2	Portugal; L 1–2	Croatia; W 2–0	3rd place, bronze medalist(s)
Girls' tournament	Turkey; W 2–0	Paraguay; W 2–0	Venezuela; W 2–0	Hong Kong; W 2–0	Netherlands; L 0–2	2	Croatia; W 2–1	Hungary; W 2–1	Chinese Taipei; W 2–1	3	Hungary; W 2–1	Croatia; W 2–0	1st place, gold medalist(s)

== Beach volleyball ==
As hosts, Argentina was given a spot to compete in the boys' and girls' tournaments.

- Boys' Tournament - 1 team of 2 athletes
- Girls' Tournament - 1 team of 2 athletes

Athletes	Event	Preliminary round		Round of 24	Round of 16	Quarterfinals	Semifinals	Final / BM	
Athletes	Event	Opposition Score	Rank	Opposition Score	Opposition Score	Opposition Score	Opposition Score	Opposition Score	Rank
Mauro Zelayeta; Juan Bautista Amieva Tarditti	Boys'	Broch–Gysin (SUI); L 1–2; Sedlak–Manas (CZE); W 2–0; Narathon–Thanan (THA); W 2–0	2 Q	Carboo–Tsatsu (GHA); W 2–0	Leon–Jurado (ECU); W 2–0	Bello–Bello (GBR); W 2–0	de Groot–Immers (NED); L 1–2	Streli–Hajós (HUN); W 2–0	3rd place, bronze medalist(s)
Brenda Ailén Churin; Delfina Amparo Villar	Girls'	Baumann–Betschart (SUI); L 1–2; Tiaan–Lauren (AUS); W 2–0; Newberry–Sparks (BRA); L 0–2	3 Q	Gierczynska–Jundzill (POL); W 2–0	Alvarez–Moreno (ESP); L 0–2	Did not advance			

== Boxing ==
As hosts, Argentina was given quotas to compete in two boys' and one girls' events.

Boys

Athlete	Event	Preliminary		Semifinals	Final / BM / PM	
Athlete	Event	Round 1	Round 2	Semifinals	Final / BM / PM	
Athlete	Event	Opposition Result	Opposition Result	Opposition Result	Opposition Result	Rank
Mirco Cuello	-56 kg	Qamili (ALB); W 3–2	—N/a	Khalokov (UZB); L 0–5	Abbaz (UZB); W 5–0	3rd place, bronze medalist(s)
Brian Arregui	-69 kg	Rakhmonov (UZB); W 3–2	—N/a	Rakhmonov (UZB); W 3–2	Elouarz (MAR); W 5–0	1st place, gold medalist(s)

Girls

Athlete	Event	Preliminary	Semifinals	Final / BM	
Athlete	Event	Opposition Result	Opposition Result	Opposition Result	Rank
Oriana Saputo	-60 kg	Hamori (HUN); W 5–0	Dubois (GBR); L 0–5	Lawson (AUS); W 5–0	3rd place, bronze medalist(s)

== Canoeing ==
Argentina entered three boats based on its performance at the 2018 World Qualification Event.

- Boys' C1 - 1 boat
- Boys' K1 - 1 boat
- Girls' K1 - 1 boat

Boys

Athlete	Event	Qualification		Repechage		Quarterfinals	Semifinals	Final / BM	Rank
Athlete	Event	Time	Rank	Time	Rank	Opposition Result	Opposition Result	Opposition Result	Rank
Joaquín Lukac	C1 sprint	1:58.66	10 R	2:00.13	7	Did not advance			
Joaquín Lukac	C1 slalom	1:24.91	6 R	1:28.39	5	Did not advance			
Valentín Rossi	K1 sprint	1:40.93	3 Q	—N/a		van der Westhuyzen (RSA); W 1:40.760	Kiss (HUN); L 1:39.480	Pilarz (POL); W 1:38.880	3rd place, bronze medalist(s)
Valentín Rossi	K1 slalom	1:15.74	5 R	1:15.91	2 Q	Tominc (SLO); L 1:14.700	Did not advance		

Girls

Athlete	Event	Qualification		Repechage		Round of 16	Quarterfinals	Semifinals	Final / BM	Rank
Athlete	Event	Time	Rank	Time	Rank	Opposition Result	Opposition Result	Opposition Result	Opposition Result	Rank
Rebeca D'Estéfano
Rebeca D'Estéfano	K1 sprint	1:56.66	8 Q	—N/a		Bello (NGR); W 1:58.300	Pecsuková (SVK); L 1:55.280	Did not advance		
Rebeca D'Estéfano	K1 slalom	DNF	20	Did not advance						

== Cycling ==
As hosts, Argentina was given spots to compete in the boys' and girls' combined team events and in the mixed BMX racing team event. However they declined to compete in BMX racing. They later qualified two athletes in BMX freestyle based on its performance at the 2018 Urban Cycling World Championship.

- Boys' combined team - 1 team of 2 athletes
- Girls' combined team - 1 team of 2 athletes
- Mixed BMX freestyle - 1 boy and 1 girl

Mixed BMX freestyle park

Athlete	Event	Seeding				Qualification				Final / Small final				Total points	Rank
Athlete	Event	Run 1	Run 2	Score	Seed	Run 1	Run 2	Score	Rank	Run 1	Run 2	Score	Rank	Total points	Rank
Iñaki Iriartes	Mixed BMX freestyle park	77.00	59.33	68.16	4	72.33	87.33	79.83	2 Q	81.00	83.33	83.33	1	25	1st place, gold medalist(s)
Agustina Roth	Mixed BMX freestyle park	70.00	71.66	70.83	2	66.66	71.00	68.83	2 Q	72.33	74.00	74.00	2	25	1st place, gold medalist(s)

Combined team

Athlete	Event	Time trial			Road race			Cross-country Eliminator		Cross-country Short circuit		Criterium		Total points	Rank
Athlete	Event	Time	Rank	Points	Time	Rank	Points	Rank	Points	Rank	Points	Rank	Points	Total points	Rank
Agustín Durán	Boys' combined team	9:11.15	17	0	1:31:03	28	0	28	0	DNF	0	12	6	136	8
Yoel Agustín Vargas	Boys' combined team	9:11.15	17	0	1:31:03	3	65	31	0	33	0	3	65	136	8
Valentina Muñoz	Girls' combined team	10:06.11	11	8	1:42:19	17	0	21	0	14	3	32	0	14	16
Camila Samso	Girls' combined team	10:06.11	11	8	1:42:19	23	0	16	3	21	0	18	0	14	16

== Dancesport ==
As hosts, Argentina was given two quotas to compete in dancesport.

- B-Boys - Broly
- B-Girls - Vale

Athlete	Event	Preliminary				Quarterfinal	Semifinal	Final / BB	
Athlete	Event	Opposition Score	Opposition Score	Opposition Score	Rank	Opposition Score	Opposition Score	Opposition Score	Rank
Broly	B-Boys'	KennyG (TPE); 2–0	Axel (POL); 1–1	Bumblebee (RUS); 0–2	7 Q	Martin (FRA); L 1–3	Did not advance		
Vale	B-Girls'	Anastasia (LAT); 1–1	Yell (KOR); 0–2	Srta. Carlota (FRA); 0–2	9	Did not advance			
Lexy (ITA); Broly	Mixed team	Ella (AUT); Bumblebee (RUS); 1–1	Ram (JPN); B4 (VIE); 2–0	Ivy (CYP); D-Matt (CAN); 2–0	2 Q	Srta. Carlota (FRA); X-Rain (CHN); W 4–0	Ella (AUT); Bumblebee (RUS); W 2–2	Ram (JPN); B4 (VIE); L 2–2	2nd place, silver medalist(s)
Vale; Axel (POL)	Mixed team	Anastacia (LAT); Shigekix (JPN); 0–2	Yell (KOR); Jordan (RSA); 0–2	Martina (RUS); Reflow (BEL); 1–1	11	Did not advance			

== Equestrian ==
As hosts, Argentina was given a quota to compete.

- Individual Jumping - 1 athlete

== Fencing ==
As hosts, Argentina was given quotas to compete in all weapons.

- Boys' Épée - 1 quota
- ~~Boys' Foil - 1 quota~~ (not used)
- Boys' Sabre - 1 quota
- ~~Girls' Épée - 1 quota~~ (not used)
- ~~Girls' Foil - 1 quota~~ (not used)
- ~~Girls' Sabre - 1 quota~~ (not used)

Boys

Athlete	Event	Pool round		Round of 16	Quarterfinals	Semifinals	Final / BM	
Athlete	Event	Opposition Score	Seed	Opposition Score	Opposition Score	Opposition Score	Opposition Score	Rank
Ignacio Pérez Contreras	Épée	Asami (JPN) L 1–5; Tolasov (RUS) L 1–5; Baudunov (KGZ) L 3–5; Veltrup (GER) L 3–5; Jarov (CAN) L 1–5	11	Tolasov (RUS); L 4–15	Did not advance			
Matías Rios	Sabre	Santana (PUR) W 5–2; Santamaría (ESP) L 3–5; Albahrani (KSA) W 5–2; Kato (JPN) L 1–5; Păștin (ROU) L 3–5; Jarry (FRA) L 2–5	11	Vidovszky (USA); L 10–15	Did not advance			

== Field hockey ==
As hosts, Argentina was given a spot to compete in both tournaments.

- Boys' tournament - 1 team of 9 athletes
- Girls' tournament - 1 team of 9 athletes

=== Boys' tournament ===
Roster

- Agustín Cabaña
- Gaspár Garrone
- Nehuén Hernando
- Ignacio Ibarra
- Tadeo Marcucci
- Santiago Micaz
- Facundo Sarto
- Lisandro Zago
- Facundo Zárate

Preliminary round

Pos	Team	Pld	W	D	L	GF	GA	GD	Pts	Qualification
1	Argentina (H)	5	5	0	0	36	6	+30	15	Quarterfinals
2	Malaysia	5	4	0	1	31	11	+20	12	Quarterfinals
3	Poland	5	2	0	3	29	17	+12	6	Quarterfinals
4	Zambia	5	2	0	3	29	23	+6	6	Quarterfinals
5	Mexico	5	2	0	3	19	20	−1	6	9th place game
6	Vanuatu	5	0	0	5	5	72	−67	0	11th place game

Source: FIH
Rules for classification: 1) Points; 2) Goal difference; 3) Goals scored; 4) Head-to-head result.
(H) Hosts

7 October 2018
13:15

Argentina	6–2	Zambia
Ibarra 1', 6', 9'; Marcucci 4', 18'; Sarto 8'	Report	Bwali 7'; Siwale 10'

Umpires:
Peter Kabaso (KEN)
James Unkles (AUS)

8 October 2018
17:45

Argentina	18–0	Vanuatu
Marcucci 2', 3', 7', 10', 15'; Zarate 4', 19'; Micaz 5', 11', 12'; Garrone 5', 11'; Ibarra 6', 8', 16', 18'; Sarto 14', 20'	Report

Umpires:
Napoleon Chanamthabam (IND)
James Unkles (AUS)

9 October 2018
13:15

Poland	2–5	Argentina
Nitka 4'; Nowkowski 20'	Report	Garrone 3'; Sarto 9', 14'; Marcucci 11'; Ibarra 20'

Umpires:
Peter Kabaso (KEN)
Nick Saunders (NZL)

10 October 2018
17:00

Malaysia	2–4	Argentina
Rosdi 5'; Ishak 9'	Report	Sarto 8', 14', 19'; Zarate 10'

Umpires:
James Unkles (AUS)
Peter Kabaso (KEN)

11 October 2018
11:00

Argentina	3–0	Mexico
Garrone 2'; Zarate 6'; Sarto 8'	Report

Umpires:
Napoleon Chanamthabam (IND)
Peter Kabaso (KEN)

Quarterfinals

12 October 2018
12:00

Argentina	5–0	Bangladesh
Zarate 1', 8', 12'; Marcucci 17'; Ibarra 18'	Report

Umpires:
Peter Kabaso (KEN)
Nick Saunders (NZL)

Semifinals

13 October 2018
15:00

Argentina	1–3	India
Zarate 4'	Report	Rajbhar 3'; Chirmako 12', 18'

Umpires:
Peter Kabaso (KEN)
Hristiyan Vasilev (BUL)

Bronze medal game

14 October 2018
13:00

Argentina (bronze)	4–0	Zambia
Zarate 4', 14'; Sarto 10'; Ibarra 19'	Report

Umpires:
Peter Kabaso (KEN)
Hideki Kinoshita (JPN)

=== Girls' tournament ===
Roster

- Brisa Bruggesser
- María Cerundolo
- Celina di Santo
- Azul Iritxity
- Victoria Miranda
- Gianella Palet
- Lourdes Pérez
- Sofía Ramallo
- Josefina Rubenacker

Preliminary round

Pos	Team	Pld	W	D	L	GF	GA	GD	Pts	Qualification
1	Argentina (H)	5	5	0	0	41	2	+39	15	Quarterfinals
2	India	5	4	0	1	29	10	+19	12	Quarterfinals
3	South Africa	5	3	0	2	19	13	+6	9	Quarterfinals
4	Austria	5	2	0	3	19	13	+6	6	Quarterfinals
5	Uruguay	5	1	0	4	23	13	+10	3	9th place game
6	Vanuatu	5	0	0	5	0	80	−80	0	11th place game

Source: FIH
Rules for classification: 1) Points; 2) Goal difference; 3) Goals scored; 4) Head-to-head result.
(H) Hosts

7 October 2018
17:00

Argentina	21–0	Vanuatu
Cerundolo 1', 10', 14', 16'; Miranda 2', 3'; Rubenacker 6', 9', 18', 20'; Ramallo 7' di Santo 9', 10', 20'; Bruggesser 11', 12', 15', 19'; Palet 11', 18', 20'	Report

Umpires:
Rhiannon Murrie (AUS)
Gemma Calderon (ESP)

8 October 2018
13:15

Argentina	6–0	Austria
Bruggesser 5', 14' di Santo 7', 16'; Rubenacker 11'; Ramallo 18'	Report

Umpires:
Gemma Calderon (ESP)
Sophie Bockelmann (GER)

9 October 2018
17:45

South Africa	0–4	Argentina
	Report	Cerundolo 3'; Bruggesser 4'; Palet 5', 12'

Umpires:
Sophie Bockelmann (GER)
Rhiannon Murrie (AUS)

10 October 2018
12:30

India	2–5	Argentina
Khan 8'; Reet 10'	Report	di Santo 7'; Ramallo 10', 12'; Bruggesser 17'; Palet 19'

Umpires:
Rhiannon Murrie (AUS)
Fatma Mahmoud (EGY)

11 October 2018
16:15

Argentina	5–0	Uruguay
Bruggesser 4'; Ramallo 5', 9'; Rubenacker 7'; Palet 9'	Report

Umpires:
Margaux Brand (CAN)
Chen Jianjun (CHN)

Quarterfinals

12 October 2018
17:00

Argentina	3–0	Namibia
Rubenacker 2'; Bruggesser 8', 20'	Report

Umpires:
Sophie Bockelmann (GER)
Margaux Brand (CAN)

Semifinals

13 October 2018
17:00

Argentina	11–0	South Africa
Cerundolo 7', 20' di Santo 9', 18'; Rubenacker 10', 10', 19'; Palet 13', 15'; Bruggesser 14', 17'	Report

Umpires:
Rhiannon Murrie (AUS)
Sophie Bockelmann (GER)

Gold medal game

14 October 2018
16:30

Argentina (gold)	3–1	India
Palet 7'; Ramallo 10'; Bruggesser 12'	Report	Khan 1'

Umpires:
Sophie Bockelmann (GER)
Rhiannon Murrie (AUS)

== Futsal ==
As hosts, Argentina can compete in either the boys' or girls' tournament.

1 team of 10 athletes

=== Boys' tournament ===
Roster

- Matías Coronel
- Alan de Candia
- Facundo Gassmann
- Joaquín Hernández
- Franco Pezzenati
- Agustín Raggiati
- Ezequiel Ramírez
- Santiago Rufino
- Nahuel Urriza
- Christian Vargas

Group stage

Pos	Team	Pld	W	D	L	GF	GA	GD	Pts	Qualification
1	Egypt	4	3	1	0	15	8	+7	10	Semi-finals
2	Argentina (H)	4	2	1	1	19	8	+11	7	Semi-finals
3	Iraq	4	2	1	1	12	5	+7	7	
4	Slovakia	4	1	0	3	5	12	−7	3	
5	Panama	4	0	1	3	7	25	−18	1	

Source: FIFA IOC
(H) Hosts
7 October 2018
20:00

Argentina	2–2	Egypt
De Candia 37'; Hernández 39'	Report (FIFA); Report (IOC) Category:Futsal at the 2018 Summer Youth Olympics – Boys First Round – ARG-EGY on Wikimedia Commons	Morsy 12'; El-Sayed 17'

Tecnópolis
Attendance: 6,150
Referee: Miguel Oliveira (Portugal)

10 October 2018
18:00

Slovakia	0–4	Argentina
	Report (FIFA); Report (IOC)	De Candia 2'; Ramírez 10'; Urriza 19'; Rufino 23'

Tecnópolis
Attendance: 6,150
Referee: Lee Po-fu (Chinese Taipei)

12 October 2018
20:00

Argentina	1–4	Iraq
Rufino 21'	Report (FIFA); Report (IOC)	Sabeeh 26'; Sabri 30'; Ismael 37'; Kadhim 37'

Tecnópolis
Attendance: 6,500
Referee: Nikola Jelić (Croatia)

13 October 2018
20:00

Panama	2–12	Argentina
Ogilvie 4'; Agrazal 19'	Report (FIFA); Report (IOC)	Gassman 5', 10', 13', 19', 23', 25'; Rufino 11'; Ramírez 16', 26'; Raggiati 34'; Hernández 36'; De Candia 40' (pen.)

Tecnópolis
Attendance: 6,500
Referee: Khalid Hnich (Morocco)

Semifinals

15 October 2018
20:00

Brazil	3–2	Argentina
Guilhermão 1'; Neguinho 11'; Breno 28'	Report (FIFA); Report (IOC)	Raggiati 19' (pen.); Rufino 21'

Tecnópolis
Attendance: 6,500
Referee: Nikola Jelić (Croatia)

Bronze medal match

18 October 2018
10:30

Argentina	4–5	Egypt
Ramírez 1', 10'; Raggiati 4'; De Candia 40'	Report (FIFA); Report (IOC) Category:Futsal at the 2018 Summer Youth Olympics – Boys Bronze medal match on Wikimedia Commons	Talaat 16', 21', 31', 39'; Ahmed 20'

Tecnópolis
Attendance: 4,800
Referee: David Urdánoz (Spain)

== Golf ==
As hosts, Argentina was given a quota to compete in the men's and women's events.

- Men's individual - 1 quota
- Women's individual - 1 quota

Individuals

Athlete	Event	Round 1		Round 2			Round 3			Total	
Athlete	Event	Score	Rank	Score	Total	Rank	Score	Total	Rank	Score	Rank
Mateo Fernández de Oliveira	Men's	73	8	74	147	14	72	219	9	219	11
Ela Anacona	Women's	73	12	75	148	15	72	220	5	220	5

Mixed team

Athlete	Event	Round 1	Round 2	Round 3	Round 4	Total	
Athlete	Event	Score	Score	Score	Score	Score	Rank
Mateo Fernández de Oliveira; Ela Anacona	Mixed	65	70	69	69	268	3rd place, bronze medalist(s)

== Gymnastics ==
=== Artistic ===
As hosts, Argentina was given a quota to compete in the boys' and girls' events.

- Boys' artistic individual all-around - 1 quota
- Girls' artistic individual all-around - 1 quota

=== Rhythmic ===
As hosts, Argentina was given a quota to compete in the girls' event.

- Girls' rhythmic individual all-around - 1 quota

=== Trampoline ===
As hosts, Argentina was given a quota to compete in either the boys' or girls' event.

- Boys' trampoline - 1 quota

== Judo ==
As hosts, Argentina was given a quota to compete in two events.

- Boys' events - 1 quota
- Girls' events - 1 quota

Individual

Athlete	Event	Round of 16	Quarterfinals	Semifinals	Rep 1	Rep 2	Rep 3	Final / BM	Rank
Athlete	Event	Opposition Result	Opposition Result	Opposition Result	Opposition Result	Opposition Result	Opposition Result	Opposition Result	Rank
Joaquín Burgos	Boys' -100 kg	—N/a	Sulamanidze (GEO); L 001-101	Did not advance	—N/a	Gutiérrez (MEX); W 011-001	Pogorevc (SLO); L 001-100	Did not advance	7
Mikaela Rojas	Girls' -44 kg	Abdourahman (DJI); W 100-000	Giménez (VEN); L 000-001	Did not advance	—N/a	Hagianu (ROU); W 011–011	Puljiz (CRO); L 002-100	Did not advance	5

Team

Athletes	Event	Round of 16	Quarterfinals	Semifinals	Final	Rank
Athletes	Event	Opposition Result	Opposition Result	Opposition Result	Opposition Result	Rank
Team Barcelona; Margarita Gritsenko (KAZ); Jalen Kon Elijah (CMR); Sosorbaram Lkhagvasüren (MGL); Loreince Nanekoula (GAB); Nikol Pencue (COL); Mikaela Rojas (ARG); Mark van Dijk (NED); Peter Miles (GBR)	Mixed Team	Team Atlanta (MIX); L 3–4	Did not advance			
Team Nanjing; Hasret Bozkurt (TUR); Joaquín Burgos (ARG); Nilufar Ermaganbetova (UZB); Rihari Iki (NZL); Alaa Mousaad Mohamed (EGY); Eva Pérez Soler (ESP); Vugar Talibov (AZE); Romain Valadier-Picard (FRA)	Mixed Team	—N/a	Team Beijing (MIX); L 3–4	Did not advance		

== Karate ==
As hosts, Argentina was given a quota to compete in four events.

- Boys' events - 2 quotas
- Girls' events - 2 quotas (declined)

Athlete	Event	Elimination round				Semifinals	Final	
Athlete	Event	Opposition Score	Opposition Score	Opposition Score	Rank	Opposition Score	Opposition Score	Rank
Rodrigo Tello	Boys' -61 kg	Hammad (JOR); L 0–1	Al Assiri (KSA); L 0–2	Veseli (MKD); L 0–6	4	Did not advance		
Juan Salsench	Boys' -68 kg	Batyrgali (KAZ); L 0–3	Sekouri (MAR); L 0–1	Nakamura (JPN); L 0–0	4	Did not advance		

== Modern pentathlon ==
As hosts, Argentina has been given a spot to compete in the boys' and girls' events. Based on their performance at the 2018 Youth A World Championship Argentina can choose to send Martina Armanazqui or use its host quota.

Athlete	Event	Fencing Ranking round (épée one touch)			Swimming (200 m freestyle)			Fencing Bonus round (épée one touch)		Combined: Shooting / Running (10 m air pistol) / (3200 m)			Total points	Final rank
Athlete	Event	Results	Rank	Points	Time	Rank	Points	Results	Points	Time	Rank	Points	Total points	Final rank
Franco Serrano	Boys' Individual	10–13	19	202	2:07.59	9	295	3–0	3	12:04.60	14	576	1076	15
Martina Armanazqui	Girls' Individual	13–10	7	226	2:18.78	7	273	1–0	1	13:35.09	18	485	985	10
Salma Abdelmaksoud (EGY); Franco Serrano	Mixed relay	15–7; 15–7	3	245	2:00.31	2	310	2–0	2	11:41.37	5	599	1156	2nd place, silver medalist(s)
Martina Armanazqui; Alex Vasilianov (MDA)	Mixed relay	10–12; 12–10	11	205	2:02.59	9	305	2–0	2	11:52.56	10	588	1100	9

== Roller speed skating ==
As hosts, Argentina was given a quota to compete in all events.

- Boys' combined speed event - Nahuel Schelling Quevedo
- Girls' combined speed event - Fernanda Illanes Cabrera

== Rowing ==
Argentina qualified a boat based on its performance at the 2017 World Junior Rowing Championships. They also qualified one boat in girls' single sculls based on their performance at the American Qualification Regatta.

- Boys' pair – 2 athletes
- Girls' single sculls - 1 athlete

Athlete	Event	Round 1		Round 2		Round 3		Total			Quarterfinals		Semifinals		Final	
Athlete	Event	Time	Rank	Time	Points	Time	Points	Time	Points	Rank	Time	Rank	Time	Rank	Time	Rank
Felipe Modarelli; Tomás Herrera	Boys' pair sculls	3:20.37	2	1:35.80	6	1:34.52	6+2	3:10.32	14	1 SA/B	—N/a		1:30.68	2 FA	1:30.97	3rd place, bronze medalist(s)
María Sol Ordás	Girls' single sculls	3:48.63	1	1:53.68	6+2	1:49.74	6+2	3:43.42	16	1 QF	1:45.14	1 SA/B	1:45.11	1 FA	1:43.81	1st place, gold medalist(s)

Qualification Legend: FA=Final A (medal); FB=Final B (non-medal); FC=Final C (non-medal); SA/B=Semifinals A/B; SC/D=Semifinals C/D; QF=Quarterfinals;

== Rugby sevens ==
As hosts, Argentina was given a quota to compete in the boys' tournament.

- Boys' tournament - 1 team of 12 athletes

Roster

- Lucio Cinti Luna
- Ramiro Costa
- Marcos Elicagaray
- Juan González
- Matteo Graziano
- Julián Hernández
- Ignacio Mendy
- Marcos Moneta
- Bautista Pedemonte
- Julián Quetglas
- Nicolás Roger
- Tomás Vanni

Group stage

Pos	Team	Pld	W	D	L	PF	PA	PD	Pts
1	Argentina	5	5	0	0	180	38	+142	15
2	France	5	4	0	1	111	65	+46	13
3	Japan	5	2	1	2	74	103	−29	10
4	South Africa	5	2	0	3	79	84	−5	9
5	United States	5	0	2	3	67	120	−53	7
6	Samoa	5	0	1	4	48	149	−101	6

Source: Buenos Aires 2018
Rules for classification: 1) Points; 2) Head-to-head result; 3) Point difference; 4) Points scored.

13 October 2018
14:15

Argentina	50–7	Samoa
Try: Costa 2'c Mendy 4'm Quetglas 5'c Roger 7'm Moneta (2) 8'c, 14'c Graziano 10'c Hernández 11'm Con: Roger (3/5) 3', 5', 9'; Elicagaray (2/3) 10', 14'	Report	Try: Tuitama 1'c Con: Sepulona (1/1) 1'

Club Atlético San Isidro, Buenos Aires
Referee: Paulo Duarte (Portugal)

13 October 2018
17:10

Argentina	45–0	Japan
Try: Cinti Luna (2) 2'c, 9'c Vanni 4'm González 6'c Mendy 8'c Graziano 11'm Moneta 13'c Con: Roger (2/3) 3', 6'; Elicagaray (3/4) 8', 9', 13'	Report

Club Atlético San Isidro, Buenos Aires
Referee: Francisco González (Uruguay)

14 October 2018
9:40

Argentina	29–12	France
Try: Vanni 0'c Moneta (2) 4'm, 13'm Costa 5'c Mendy 14'm Con: Roger (2/3) 1', 6'; Elicagaray (0/2)	Report	Try: Randle 7'c Trouabal 10'm Con: Germain (1/1) 7'; Tiberghein (0/1)

Club Atlético San Isidro, Buenos Aires
Referee: Paulo Duarte (Portugal)

14 October 2018
12:20

South Africa	5–34	Argentina
Try: Gumede 12'm Con: Rose (0/1)	Report	Try: Mendy (2) 3'm, 5'm Moneta 6'c Costa 8'm Elicagaray 10'c González 14'm Con: Elicagaray (2/4) 7', 10'; Roger (0/2)

Club Atlético San Isidro, Buenos Aires
Referee: Francisco González (Uruguay)

15 October 2018
11:30

United States	14–22	Argentina
Try: Cleary 6'c Isaia Kruse 8'c Con: Kruse (2/2) 7', 8'	Report	Try: Vanni 3'c Pedemonte 11'm Graziano 12'm Mendy 14'm Con: Elicagaray (1/2) 4'; Roger (0/2)

Club Atlético San Isidro, Buenos Aires
Referee: Francisco González (Uruguay)

Gold medal game

15 October 2018
16:00

Argentina (gold)	24–14	France
Try: Mendy 0'm Cinti Luna 2'c Roger 4'c Costa 12'm Con: Roger (2/4) 2', 5'	Report	Try: Trouabal (2) 9'c, 10'c Con: Germain (1/1) 9', 10'

Club Atlético San Isidro, Buenos Aires
Referee: Paulo Duarte (Portugal)

== Sailing ==
As hosts, Argentina qualified in every event.

Athlete	Event	Race													Net points	Final rank
Athlete	Event	1	2	3	4	5	6	7	8	9	10	11	12	M*	Net points	Final rank
Belisario Kopp	Boys' Techno 293+	9	17	(25)	1	–	25	3	14	4	18	12	4	20	127	12
Gerónimo Lutteral	Boys' TTR	10	3	7	(10)	4	(10)	–	–	–	–	–	–		24	8
Celina Saubidet Birkner	Girls' Techno 293+	8	11	12	4	–	10	(21)	6	4	2	7	4	11	79	6
Ona Romani	Girls' TTR	2	(9)	3	(9)	5.8	6	–	–	–	–	–	–		19	6
Dante Cittadini; Teresa Romairone	Nacra 15	2	1	4	2	4	1	(7)	6	2	4	1	4	6	37	1st place, gold medalist(s)

== Shooting ==
As hosts, Argentina was given two quotas to compete in shooting, however they declined to compete in boys' 10m air pistol. Argentina later qualified one sport shooter in boys' 10m air rifle based on its performance at the American Qualification Tournament.

- Boys' 10m Air Rifle - 1 quota
- Girls' 10m Air Rifle - 1 quota

Individual

Athlete	Event	Qualification		Final	
Athlete	Event	Points	Rank	Points	Rank
Facundo Firmapaz	Boys' 10m Air Rifle	616.9	12	Did not advance	
Alliana Volkart	Girls' 10m Air Rifle	616.1	13	Did not advance	

Team

Athletes	Event	Qualification		Round of 16	Quarterfinals	Semifinals	Final / BM	Rank
Athletes	Event	Points	Rank	Opposition Result	Opposition Result	Opposition Result	Opposition Result	Rank
Facundo Firmapaz; Viivi Natalia Kemppi (FIN)	Mixed Team 10m Air Rifle	825.9	4 Q	Wang (CHN); Emilov (BUL); W 10–9	Benetti (ITA); Mahardika (INA); W 10–5	Erdenechuluun (MGL); Pekler (HUN); L 5 - 10	Martínez López (MEX); Wadlegger (AUT); W 10–7	3rd place, bronze medalist(s)
Alliana Volkart; Amirsiyavash Zolfagharian (IRI)	Mixed Team 10m Air Rifle	823.2	9 Q	Bober (POL); Dević (MNE); W 10 - 9	Erdenechuluun (MGL); Pekler (HUN); L 9 - 10	Did not advance		6

== Sport climbing ==
As hosts, Argentina was given a quota to compete in the boys' and girls' events. Argentina only sent 1 girl.

- Girls' combined - 1 quota

Athlete	Event	Qualification					Final				
Athlete	Event	Speed	Bouldering	Lead	Total	Rank	Speed	Bouldering	Lead	Total	Rank
Valentina Aguado	Girls' combined	6	7	11	462	9	Did not advance				

== Swimming ==
As hosts, Argentina is allowed to send the maximum quota of four boys' and four girls.

Boys

Athlete	Event	Heat		Semifinal		Final	
Athlete	Event	Time	Rank	Time	Rank	Time	Rank
Juan Ignacio Méndez	200 m backstroke	2:03.08	10	—N/a		Did not advance	
Joaquín González Piñero	200 m butterfly	2:08.57	33	—N/a		Did not advance	
Joaquín González Piñero	200 m individual medley	2:06.78	14	—N/a		Did not advance	

Girls

Athlete	Event	Heat		Semifinal		Final	
Athlete	Event	Time	Rank	Time	Rank	Time	Rank
Julieta Lema	50 m freestyle	26.02	11 Q	25.99	13	Did not advance	
Julieta Lema	100 m freestyle	57.07	19	Did not advance			
Julieta Lema	50 m butterfly	27.55	10 Q	27.16	9	Did not advance	
Delfina Pignatiello	400 m freestyle	4:11.86	2 Q	—N/a		4:10.40	2nd place, silver medalist(s)
Delfina Pignatiello	800 m freestyle	8:32.42	2 Q	—N/a		8:32.42	2nd place, silver medalist(s)
Delfina Dini	400 m freestyle	4:17.00	7 Q	—N/a		4:19.25	8
Delfina Dini	800 m freestyle	8:43.71	4 Q	—N/a		8:43.71	4
María Selene Alborzen	100 m breaststroke	1:12.23	29	Did not advance			
María Selene Alborzen	200 m breaststroke	2:32.14	10	—N/a		Did not advance	
María Selene Alborzen	200 m individual medley	2:20.81	20	—N/a		Did not advance	

Mixed

Athlete	Event	Heat		Final	
Athlete	Event	Time	Rank	Time	Rank
Juan Ignacio Méndez; Joaquín González Piñero; Delfina Dini; Julieta Lema	4 × 100 m freestyle relay	3:42.88	15	Did not advance	
Juan Ignacio Méndez; Joaquín González Piñero; María Selene Alborzen; Julieta Lema	4 × 100 m medley relay	4:04.39	19	Did not advance	

== Table tennis ==
As hosts, Argentina was given two quotas to compete in table tennis. Argentina only sent 1 boy.

- Boys' singles - 1 quota
- Girls' singles - 1 quota

Athlete	Event	Group stage		Round of 16	Quarterfinals	Semifinals	Final / BM	
Athlete	Event	Opposition Score	Rank	Opposition Score	Opposition Score	Opposition Score	Opposition Score	Rank
Martín Bentancor	Boys' singles	Moregard (SWE) L 1–4; Kim (PRK) L 0–4; Mutti (THA) L 1–4	4	Did not advance				
Santiago Lorenzo; Chiara Morri (SMR)	Mixed team	France L 0–3; Azerbaijan L 0–3; India L 0–3	4	Did not advance				

== Taekwondo ==
As hosts, Argentina is allowed to send the maximum quota of three athletes.

Athlete	Event	Round of 16	Quarterfinals	Semifinals	Final	
Athlete	Event	Opposition Result	Opposition Result	Opposition Result	Opposition Result	Rank
José Acuña	Boys −55 kg	Alqade (LBA); W 13–4	Amadou (IND); L 7–10	Did not advance		
Ramiro Ravachino	Boys −63 kg	Bye	Cho (KOR); L 21–41	Did not advance		
Milagros Cali	Girls −44 kg	Bye	Rodriguez (MEX); L 3–23	Did not advance		

== Tennis ==
As hosts, Argentina is given a quota to compete in the boys' and girls' singles.

Singles

Athlete	Event	Round of 32	Round of 16	Quarterfinals	Semifinals	Final / BM	
Athlete	Event	Opposition Score	Opposition Score	Opposition Score	Opposition Score	Opposition Score	Rank
Sebastián Báez	Boys' singles	Ho (TPE); W 6–4, 6–1	Álvarez (ESP); W 5–7, 6–4, 6–4	Soares (BRA); L 4–6, 4–6	Did not advance		
Facundo Díaz Acosta	Boys' singles	Henning (RSA); W 6–0, 6–3	de Jong (NED); W 4–6, 6–4, 6-3	Chun-hsin (TPE); W 6–2, 6-4	Andreev (BUL); W 6–4, 6–1	Gaston (FRA); L 4–6, 5-7	2nd place, silver medalist(s)
María Lourdes Carlé	Girls' singles	Osorio (COL); L 6^{4}–7^{7}, 5–7	Did not advance				

Doubles

Athletes	Event	Round of 32	Round of 16	Quarterfinals	Semifinals	Final / BM	
Athletes	Event	Opposition Score	Opposition Score	Opposition Score	Opposition Score	Opposition Score	Rank
Sebastián Báez; Facundo Díaz Acosta	Boys' doubles	—N/a	Chun-hsin (TPE) / Ho (TPE); W 7–5, 6–2	Tao (CHN) / Tajima (JPN); W 6–0, 6-1	Štyler (CZE) / Svrčina (CZE); W 7–5, 1–6, [10-6]	Andreev (BUL) / Hijikata (AUS); W 6–4, 6-4	1st place, gold medalist(s)
María Lourdes Carlé; Camila Osorio (COL)	Girls' doubles	—N/a	Nahimana (BDI) / Rivera (GUA); W 6–4, 6–4	Rakhimova (RUS) / Selekhmeteva (RUS); W 7–5, 3–6, [10-7]	Juvan (SLO) / Świątek (POL); L 2–6, 2-6	Wang (CHN) / Wang (CHN); L 5–7, 3-6	4
Facundo Díaz Acosta; Francesca Curmi (MLT)	Mixed doubles	Garland (TPE) / Chun-hsin (TPE); L 2–6, 6–3, [3–10]	Did not advance				
Sebastián Báez; María Lourdes Carlé	Mixed doubles	Álvarez (ESP) / Zünd (LIE); W 6–4, 6–2	Burel (FRA) / Gaston (FRA); L 5–7, 6–4, [8-10]	Did not advance			

== Triathlon ==
As hosts, Argentina was given a quota to compete in the boys' and girls' races but only one female athlete competed.

Individual

Athlete	Event	Swim (750m)	Trans 1	Bike (19.2 km)	Trans 2	Run (5 km)	Total time	Rank
Delfina Orlandini	Girls	10:21	0:47	31:33	0:29	19:54	1:03:04	21

Relay

Athlete	Event	Total times per athlete (Swim 300m, Bike 6.4 km, Run 2 km)	Total group time	Rank
Americas 3 Delfina Orlandini; Gabriel Terán Carvajal (ECU); Maria Barbosa Sánchez (COL); Solen Wood (CAN)	Mixed relay	22:49; 21:27; 24:52; 22:35	1:31:43	7

== Weightlifting ==
As hosts, Argentina is given two quotas to compete.

- Boys' events - 1 quota
- Girls' events - 1 quota

Athlete	Event	Snatch		Clean & jerk		Total	Rank
Athlete	Event	Result	Rank	Result	Rank	Total	Rank
Jonatan Leyes	Boy's 56 kg	95	4	120	4	215	4
María Luz Casadevall	Girl's 63 kg	85	4	105	4	190	4

== Wrestling ==
As hosts, Argentina is given three quotas to compete.

- Boys' freestyle events - 1 quota
- Boys' Greco-Roman events - 1 quota
- Girls' freestyle events - 1 quota

Athlete	Event	Group stage					Final / BM / RM	
Athlete	Event	Opposition Score	Opposition Score	Opposition Score	Opposition Score	Rank	Opposition Score	Rank
Hernán Almendra	Freestyle -55 kg	Whitt (GUA); W 4–0	Laribi (ALG); W 5–4	—N/a		1Q	Howard (USA); L 6–17	2nd place, silver medalist(s)
Eduardo Lovera	Greco-Roman -51 kg	Adiniwin (MHL); W 4–0	Tokhadze (GEO); L 0–6	—N/a		2Q	Salas (MEX); L 3–5	4
Linda Machuca	Girls' freestyle 73 kg	Gök (TUR); W 8–1	Dzibuk (BLR); W 8–6	Oknazarova (UZB); W 10–9	Jlassi (TUN); W 2–5	1Q	Marín (CUB); L 0–4	2nd place, silver medalist(s)
