= Austria at the 2018 Summer Youth Olympics =

- IOC code: AUT
- NOC: Austrian Olympic Committee
- Website: http://www.olympia.at/

in Buenos Aires, Argentina 6 – 18 October 2018
- Competitors: 41 in 13 sports
- Flag bearer: Laura Stigger
- Medals Ranked 51st: Gold 1 Silver 1 Bronze 7 Total 9

Summer Youth Olympics appearances (overview)
- 2010; 2014; 2018

Austria participated at the 2018 Summer Youth Olympics in Buenos Aires, Argentina from 6 October to 18 October 2018.

== Medalists ==
Medals awarded to participants of mixed-NOC (combined) teams are represented in italics. These medals are not counted towards the individual NOC medal tally.

Medal	Name	Sport	Event	Date
Gold	Sandra Lettner	Sport climbing	Girls' combined	9 October
Silver	Laura Stigger; Hannah Streicher	Cycling	Girls' combined team	17 October
Bronze	Daniel Leutgeb	Judo	Boys' 55 kg	7 October
Bronze	Laura Lammer	Sport climbing	Girls' combined	9 October
Bronze	Marlene Kahler	Swimming	Girls' 800 m freestyle	9 October
Bronze	Daniel Leutgeb	Judo	Mixed team (in mixed-NOC team with Team London)	10 October
Bronze	Emma Spitz	Golf	Girls' individual	11 October
Bronze	Anna Thurner	Dancesport	Mixed team (in mixed-NOC team with RUS)	11 October
Bronze	Marlene Kahler	Swimming	Girls' 400 m freestyle	12 October
Bronze	Ingeborg Grünwald	Athletics	Girls' long jump	14 October
Bronze	Benny Wizani	Gymnastics	Boys' trampoline	14 October

== Cycling ==
Austria qualified a girls' combined team based on its ranking in the Youth Olympic Games Junior Nation Rankings.

- Girls' combined team - 1 team of 2 athletes

Athlete	Event	Team time trial			Road race			XC eliminator		XC short circuit			Criterium				Total	
Athlete	Event	Time	Rank	Points	Time	Rank	Points	Rank	Points	Time	Rank	Points	Laps	Sprint pts	Rank	Points	Points	Rank
Laura Stigger	Girls' combined team	9:52.06	5	40	1:42:19	3	65	1	100	18:13	1	100	16	8	5	40	355	2nd place, silver medalist(s)
Hannah Streicher	Girls' combined team	9:52.06	5	40	1:42:19	15	2	18	0	20:08	18	0	16	0	11	8	355	2nd place, silver medalist(s)

== Dancesport ==
Austria qualified one dancer based on its performance at the 2018 World Youth Breaking Championship.

- B-Girls - Ella

== Fencing ==
Austria qualified one athlete based on its performance at the 2018 Cadet World Championship.

- Boys' Epée - Alexander Biro

== Field hockey ==
=== Boys' tournament ===
Preliminary round

Pos	Team	Pld	W	D	L	GF	GA	GD	Pts	Qualification
1	Australia	5	5	0	0	23	9	+14	15	Quarterfinals
2	India	5	4	0	1	34	8	+26	12	Quarterfinals
3	Austria	5	3	0	2	11	16	−5	9	Quarterfinals
4	Bangladesh	5	2	0	3	12	22	−10	6	Quarterfinals
5	Canada	5	1	0	4	13	22	−9	3	9th place game
6	Kenya	5	0	0	5	10	26	−16	0	11th place game

Source: FIH
Rules for classification: 1) Points; 2) Goal difference; 3) Goals scored; 4) Head-to-head result.

7 October 2018
12:30

Canada	2–3	Austria
Childs 6'; Butt 12'	Report	Wellan 3'; Matousek 5', 13'

Umpires:
Nick Saunders (NZL)
Jonathan Altamirano (MEX)

8 October 2018
14:45

India	9–1	Austria
Sanjay 2'; Anand 4', 10', 17'; Chirmako 6', 11', 14', 18'; Prasad 13'	Report	Drusany 8'

Umpires:
Hristiyan Vasilev (BUL)
Nick Saunders (NZL)

9 October 2018
10:15

Austria	3–0	Bangladesh
Matousek 9', 14'; Trnka 18'	Report

Umpires:
Nick Saunders (NZL)
Hristiyan Vasilev (BUL)

10 October 2018
14:00

Austria	4–3	Kenya
Matousek 2'; Drusany 4'; Nyckowiak 10', 18'	Report	Ouma 4'; Omutekete 10'; Ogenche 14'

Umpires:
Hristiyan Vasilev (BUL)
Darren Hubach (RSA)

11 October 2018
11:45

Australia	2–0	Austria
Murray 9'; B. Marais 17'	Report

Umpires:
Nick Saunders (NZL)
Jonathan Altamirano (MEX)

Quarterfinals

12 October 2018
9:00

Malaysia	2–0	Austria
Anuar 11', 19'	Report

Umpires:
Hideki Kinoshita (JPN)
Jonathan Altamirano (MEX)

5–8th place semifinals

13 October 2018
10:00

Austria	3–8	Australia
Trnka 9', 14', 17'	Report	Marais 1'; Murray 2'; Collins 5', 8', 13'; Carr 6', 12'; White 16'

Umpires:
Hideko Kinoshita (JPN)
Darren Hubach (RSA)

=== Girls' tournament ===
Preliminary round

Pos	Team	Pld	W	D	L	GF	GA	GD	Pts	Qualification
1	Argentina (H)	5	5	0	0	41	2	+39	15	Quarterfinals
2	India	5	4	0	1	29	10	+19	12	Quarterfinals
3	South Africa	5	3	0	2	19	13	+6	9	Quarterfinals
4	Austria	5	2	0	3	19	13	+6	6	Quarterfinals
5	Uruguay	5	1	0	4	23	13	+10	3	9th place game
6	Vanuatu	5	0	0	5	0	80	−80	0	11th place game

Source: FIH
Rules for classification: 1) Points; 2) Goal difference; 3) Goals scored; 4) Head-to-head result.
(H) Hosts

7 October 2018
14:00

India	4–2	Austria
Lalremsiami 4', 17'; Tete 5'; Khan 16'	Report	Hruby 13'; Kern 20'

Umpires:
Sophie Bockelmann (GER)
Margaux Brand (CAN)

8 October 2018
13:15

Argentina	6–0	Austria
Bruggesser 5', 14' di Santo 7', 16'; Rubenacker 11'; Ramallo 18'	Report

Umpires:
Gemma Calderon (ESP)
Sophie Bockelmann (GER)

9 October 2018
17:00

Uruguay	1–2	Austria
Martinez 15'	Report	Herzog 13'; Klausbruckner 19'

Umpires:
Lizé Srtydom (RSA)
Fatma Mahmoud (EGY)

10 October 2018
13:15

Austria	1–2	South Africa
Herzog 16'	Report	de Waal 3', 14'

Umpires:
Margaux Brand (CAN)
Ayu Zainuddin (MAS)

11 October 2018
14:45

Austria	14–0	Vanuatu
Herzog 1', 7', 18', 18'; Klausbruckner 2', 5', 19'; Kern 6', 11', 11'; Czech 13', 16'; Felber 14', 17'	Report

Umpires:
Chen Jianjun (CHN)
Cynthia Clement (GHA)

Quarterfinals

12 October 2018
16:00

China	1–1	Austria
Zou 16'	Report	Buchta 5'
Penalties
Ma (penalty shoot-out missed); Gu (penalty shoot-out missed); Zou (penalty shoot-out scored); Zou (penalty shoot-out missed); Ma (penalty shoot-out scored)	2–1	(penalty shoot-out scored) Czech; (penalty shoot-out missed) Klausbruckner; (penalty shoot-out missed) Herzog; (penalty shoot-out missed) Czech; (penalty shoot-out missed) Klausbruckner

Umpires:
Rhiannon Murrie (AUS)
Gemma Calderon (ESP)

5–8th place semifinals

13 October 2018
12:00

Poland	1–3	Austria
Balcerzak 20'	Report	Klausbruckner 8'; Felber 10'; Herzog 17'

14 October 2018
11:30

Australia	3–0	Austria
Schonell 10', 13'; Lawton 16'	Report

Umpires:
Jianjun Chen (CHN)
Lize Strydom (RSA)

== Golf ==
Individual

Athlete	Event	Round 1		Round 2			Round 3			Bronze medal playoff	Total		
Athlete	Event	Score	Rank	Score	Total	Rank	Score	Total	Rank	Score	Score	Par	Rank
Emma Spitz	Girls' Individual	72 (+2)	7	70 (E)	142	2	72 (+2)	214	5	4 (E)	214	+4	3rd place, bronze medalist(s)
Christoph Bleier	Boys' Individual	77 (+7)	23	76 (+6)	153	20	72 (+2)	225	9	—	225	+15	20

Team

Athletes	Event	Round 1 (Fourball)		Round 2 (Foursome)		Round 3 (Individual stroke)				Total		
Athletes	Event	Score	Rank	Score	Rank	Girl	Boy	Total	Rank	Score	Par	Rank
Emma Spitz; Christoph Bleier	Mixed team	66 (−4)	16	70 (E)	3	70	72	142 (+2)	4	278	−2	4

== Gymnastics ==
=== Trampoline ===
Austria qualified one gymnast based on its performance at the 2018 European Junior Championship.

- Boys' trampoline - 1 quota

== Judo ==
Athlete	Event	Round of 16	Quarterfinals	Semifinals	Repechage			Final / BM	
Athlete	Event	Round of 16	Quarterfinals	Semifinals	Round of 8	Quarterfinals	Semifinals	Final / BM	
Athlete	Event	Opposition Result	Opposition Result	Opposition Result	Opposition Result	Opposition Result	Opposition Result	Opposition Result	Rank
Daniel Leutgeb	Boys' 55 kg	Euclides Lopes (GBS); W 10-00	Aleddine Ben Chalbi (TUN); W 10-01s1	Artsiom Kolasau (BLR); L 00s2-11	Bye			Ariel Shulman (ISR); W 10-00s1	3rd place, bronze medalist(s)

Team

Athletes	Event	Round of 16	Quarterfinals	Semifinals	Final	
Athletes	Event	Opposition Result	Opposition Result	Opposition Result	Opposition Result	Rank
Team London; Yangchen Wangmo (BHU); Daniel Leutgeb (AUT); Noemi Huayhuameza Orneta (PER); Joao Santos (BRA); Rachel Krapman (CAN); Ahmed Rebahi (ALG); Edith Ortiz (ECU); Bekarys Saduakas (KAZ)	Mixed team	Bye	Team Moscow (MIX); W 4–3	Team Beijing (MIX); L 0–7	Did not advance	3rd place, bronze medalist(s)

== Sailing ==
Austria qualified one boat based on its performance at the 2018 Nacra 15 World Championships.

- Mixed Nacra 15 - 1 boat

Athlete	Event	Race													Net points	Final rank
Athlete	Event	1	2	3	4	5	6	7	8	9	10	11	12	M*	Net points	Final rank
Laura Farese; Matthaeus Zoechling	Nacra 15	9	(15)	11	14	11	11	10	(15)	5	13	10	6	7	137.0	13

== Shooting ==
Individual

Athlete	Event	Qualification		Final	
Athlete	Event	Points	Rank	Points	Rank
Stefan Wadlegger	Boys' 10m Air Rifle	620.2	8	141.3	7

Team

Athletes	Event	Qualification		Round of 16	Quarterfinals	Semifinals	Final / BM	Rank
Athletes	Event	Points	Rank	Opposition Result	Opposition Result	Opposition Result	Opposition Result	Rank
Martínez (MEX); Wadlegger (AUT)	Mixed Team 10m Air Rifle	823.0	10	Takagi (JPN); Ulbrich (GER); W 10–7	Chen (TPE); Sharar (BAN); W 10–8	Anastasiia Dereviagina (RUS); Edson Ramírez (MEX); L 8–10	Kemppi (FIN); Firmapaz (ARG); L 7–10	4

== Sport climbing ==
Austria qualified two sport climbers based on its performance at the 2017 World Youth Sport Climbing Championships. They also qualified another climber based on its performance at the 2017 European Youth Sport Climbing Championships.

- Boys' combined - 1 quota (Nikolai Uznik)
- Girls' combined - 2 quotas (Sandra Lettner, Laura Lammer)
