= Field hockey at the 2018 Summer Youth Olympics – Girls' tournament =

2018 Summer Youth Olympics
Tournament details
- Host country: Argentina
- City: Buenos Aires
- Dates: 7–14 October
- Teams: 12
- Venue: Parque Polideportivo Roca

Final positions
- Champions: Argentina (1st title)
- Runner-up: India
- Third place: China

Tournament statistics
- Matches played: 44
- Goals scored: 269 (6.11 per match)
- Top scorer(s): (Argentina) Brisa Bruggesser (Australia) Courtney Schonell (14 goals)

The girls' tournament at the 2018 Summer Youth Olympics was held at the Parque Polideportivo Roca from 7 to 14 October 2018. Argentina won the gold by defeating India in the final.

== Results ==
All times are Argentina Time (UTC-03:00)

=== Preliminary round ===
==== Pool A ====
Pos	Team	Pld	W	D	L	GF	GA	GD	Pts	Qualification
1	Argentina (H)	5	5	0	0	41	2	+39	15	Quarterfinals
2	India	5	4	0	1	29	10	+19	12	Quarterfinals
3	South Africa	5	3	0	2	19	13	+6	9	Quarterfinals
4	Austria	5	2	0	3	19	13	+6	6	Quarterfinals
5	Uruguay	5	1	0	4	23	13	+10	3	9th place game
6	Vanuatu	5	0	0	5	0	80	−80	0	11th place game

Source: FIH
Rules for classification: 1) Points; 2) Goal difference; 3) Goals scored; 4) Head-to-head result.
(H) Hosts

7 October 2018
14:00

India	4–2	Austria
Lalremsiami 4', 17'; Tete 5'; Khan 16'	Report	Hruby 13'; Kern 20'

Umpires:
Sophie Bockelmann (GER)
Margaux Brand (CAN)

7 October 2018
14:45

South Africa	4–3	Uruguay
de Waal 4', 6', 14'; Weston 20'	Report	Oliveros 1', 19'; Arias 10'

Umpires:
Victoria Pazos (PAR)
Chen Jianjun (CHN)

7 October 2018
17:00

Argentina	21–0	Vanuatu
Cerundolo 1', 10', 14', 16'; Miranda 2', 3'; Rübenacker 6', 9', 18', 20'; Ramallo 7' di Santo 9', 10', 20'; Bruggesser 11', 12', 15', 19'; Palet 11', 18', 20'	Report

Umpires:
Rhiannon Murrie (AUS)
Gemma Calderon (ESP)

8 October 2018
09:30

India	2–1	Uruguay
Lalremsiami 1', 19'	Report	Verga 10'

Umpires:
Sophie Bockelmann (GER)
Rhiannon Murrie (AUS)

8 October 2018
10:15

Vanuatu	0–11	South Africa
	Report	Weston 4', 7', 20' de Waal 8', 11', 13'; McLaren 9'; Welham 16'; Nkosi 18', 18', 19'

Umpires:
Chen Jianjun (CHN)
Fatma Mahmoud (EGY)

8 October 2018
13:15

Argentina	6–0	Austria
Bruggesser 5', 14' di Santo 7', 16'; Rübenacker 11'; Ramallo 18'	Report

Umpires:
Gemma Calderon (ESP)
Sophie Bockelmann (GER)

9 October 2018
16:15

Vanuatu	0–16	India
	Report	Lalremsiami 2', 10'; Reet 3', 6'; Tete 4', 13'; Kaur 5', 5'; Chetna 6', 14', 17'; Khan 8', 11', 12', 15'; Chaudhary 20'

Umpires:
Cynthia Clement (GHA)
Chen Jianjun (CHN)

9 October 2018
17:00

Uruguay	1–2	Austria
Martinez 15'	Report	Herzog 13'; Klausbruckner 19'

Umpires:
Lizé Srtydom (RSA)
Fatma Mahmoud (EGY)

9 October 2018
17:45

South Africa	0–4	Argentina
	Report	Cerundolo 3'; Bruggesser 4'; Palet 5', 12'

Umpires:
Sophie Bockelmann (GER)
Rhiannon Murrie (AUS)

10 October 2018
11:45

Uruguay	18–0	Vanuatu
Oliveros 2', 8', 10', 16', 16', 16'; Verga 2', 13', 13', 17'; Civetta 3'; Jover 5', 14'; Quiñones 6', 7', 20'; Suárez 17', 18'	Report

Umpires:
Chen Jianjun (CHN)
Gemma Calderon (ESP)

10 October 2018
12:30

India	2–5	Argentina
Khan 8'; Reet 10'	Report	di Santo 7'; Ramallo 10', 12'; Bruggesser 17'; Palet 19'

Umpires:
Rhiannon Murrie (AUS)
Fatma Mahmoud (EGY)

10 October 2018
13:15

Austria	1–2	South Africa
Herzog 16'	Report	de Waal 3', 14'

Umpires:
Margaux Brand (CAN)
Ayu Zainuddin (MAS)

11 October 2018
14:00

South Africa	2–5	India
de Waal 10'; Welham 19'	Report	Khan 2', 17'; Reet 10'; Lalremsiami 12'; Chaudhary 13'

Umpires:
Rhiannon Murrie (AUS)
Fatma Mahmoud (EGY)

11 October 2018
14:45

Austria	14–0	Vanuatu
Herzog 1', 7', 18', 18'; Klausbruckner 2', 5', 19'; Kern 6', 11', 11'; Czech 13', 16'; Felber 14', 17'	Report

Umpires:
Chen Jianjun (CHN)
Cynthia Clement (GHA)

11 October 2018
16:15

Argentina	5–0	Uruguay
Bruggesser 4'; Ramallo 5', 9'; Rübenacker 7'; Palet 9'	Report

Umpires:
Margaux Brand (CAN)
Chen Jianjun (CHN)

==== Pool B ====
Pos	Team	Pld	W	D	L	GF	GA	GD	Pts	Qualification
1	China	5	5	0	0	29	1	+28	15	Quarterfinals
2	Australia	5	2	1	2	23	8	+15	7	Quarterfinals
3	Poland	5	2	1	2	4	14	−10	7	Quarterfinals
4	Namibia	5	1	2	2	9	17	−8	5	Quarterfinals
5	Zimbabwe	5	1	1	3	6	23	−17	4	9th place game
6	Mexico	5	0	3	2	5	13	−8	3	11th place game

Source: FIH
Rules for classification: 1) Points; 2) Goal difference; 3) Goals scored; 4) Head-to-head result.

7 October 2018
15:30

Australia	10–0	Zimbabwe
Lawton 2'; Schonell 5', 11', 12', 19'; Mathison 7'; Sertorio 13'; Young 14'; Duncan 17'; Smith 18'	Report

Umpires:
Gemma Calderon (ESP)
Ayo Zainuddin (MAS)

7 October 2018
16:15

China	8–0	Namibia
Zou 3', 20'; Ma 5', 6', 6', 19'; Yu 6'; Zhang 15'	Report

Umpires:
Lize Strydom (RSA)
Cynthia Clement (GHA)

7 October 2018
17:45

Poland	1–1	Mexico
Balcerzak 17'	Report	Cuevas 7'

Umpires:
Margaux Brand (CAN)
Fatma Mahmoud (EGY)

8 October 2018
11:00

Australia	3–4	Namibia
Lawton 7', 16'; Smith 18'	Report	Myburgh 1'; Cormack 4', 9' van Rooyen 10'

Umpires:
Victoria Pazos (PAR)
Margaux Brand (CAN)

8 October 2018
11:45

China	7–0	Mexico
Cai 3', 10', 15'; Yu 7'; Ma 16', 17'; Zhang 17'	Report

Umpires:
Lize Strydom (RSA)
Ayu Zainuddin (MAS)

8 October 2018
12:30

Zimbabwe	1–2	Poland
A. Terblanche 4'	Report	Mazur 5'; Balcerzak 6'

Umpires:
Cynthia Clement (GHA)
Victoria Pazos (PAR)

9 October 2018
14:00

Zimbabwe	0–7	China
	Report	Cai 3', 10', 15'; Yu 7'; Ma 16', 17'; Zhang 17'

Umpires:
Lizé Strydom (RSA)
Ayu Zainuddin (MAS)

9 October 2018
14:45

Mexico	2–2	Namibia
Gonzalez 6', 19'	Report	Cormack 3'; Myburgh 10'

Umpires:
Fatma Mahmoud (EGY)
Gemma Calderon Alcade (ESP)

9 October 2018
15:30

Poland	0–8	Australia
	Report	Schonell 2', 3', 6', 7', 16'; Smith 8'; Sertorio 9', 18'

Umpires:
Victoria Pazos (PAR)
Margaux Brand (CAN)

10 October 2018
09:30

Mexico	1–2	Zimbabwe
Ramirez 19'	Report	A. Terblanche 1'; N. Terblanche 9'

Umpires:
Cynthia Clement (GHA)
Margaux Brand (CAN)

10 October 2018
10:15

China	3–1	Australia
Gu 4'; Zou 5', 14'	Report	Smith 7'

Umpires:
Lizé Strydom (RSA)
Sophie Bockelmann (GER)

10 October 2018
11:00

Namibia	0–1	Poland
	Report	Mazur 20'

Umpires:
Victoria Pazos (PAR)
Ayu Zainuddin (MAS)

11 October 2018
15:30

Australia	1–1	Mexico
Schonell 20'	Report	Verdugo 13'

Umpires:
Ayu Zainuddin (MAS)
Gemma Calderon (ESP)

11 October 2018
17:00

Namibia	3–3	Zimbabwe
Myburgh 4'; Schimming 15'; Cormack 15'	Report	A. Terblanche 9', 10'; Herbst 16'

Umpires:
Victoria Pazos (PAR)
Sophie Bockelmann (GER)

11 October 2018
17:45

Poland	0–4	China
	Report	Ma 4', 11', 12', 19'

Umpires:
Lize Strydom (RSA)
Ayu Zainuddin (MAS)

=== Classification round ===
==== Eleventh and twelfth place ====
13 October 2018
08:00

Vanuatu	0–5	Mexico
	Report	Cuevas 10', 18', 20'; Ramírez 15', 19'

Umpires:
Cynthia Clement (GHA)
Gemma Calderon (ESP)

==== Ninth and tenth place ====
13 October 2018
13:00

Uruguay	2–0	Zimbabwe
Oliveros 8'; Suarez 13'	Report

Umpires:
Ayu Zainuddin (MAS)
Margaux Brand (CAN)

=== Medal round ===
Quarterfinals
12 October 2018
Argentina	3
Namibia	0
12 October 2018
Australia	3 (2)
South Africa (p.s.o.)	3 (3)
12 October 2018
India	3
Poland	0
12 October 2018
China (p.s.o.)	1 (2)
Austria	1 (1)

Semi-finals
13 October 2018
Argentina	11
South Africa	0
13 October 2018
India	3
China	0

Gold-medal match
14 October 2018
Argentina	3
India	1
Bronze-medal match
14 October 2018
South Africa	0
China	6

==== Quarterfinals ====
12 October 2018
14:00

India	3–0	Poland
Lalremsiami 10'; Tete 14'; Kaur 14'	Report

Umpires:
Lizé Srtydom (RSA)
Chen Jianjun (CHN)

12 October 2018
15:00

Australia	3–3	South Africa
Lawton 4', 16'; Young 14'	Report	de Waal 6', 11'; McLaren 19'
Penalties
Sertorio (penalty shoot-out scored); Schonell (penalty shoot-out scored); Lawton (penalty shoot-out missed); Schonell (penalty shoot-out missed)	2–3	(penalty shoot-out scored) de Waal; (penalty shoot-out missed) Welham; (penalty shoot-out scored) Weston; (penalty shoot-out scored) de Waal

Umpires:
Victoria Pazos (PAR)
Fatma Mahmoud (EGY)

12 October 2018
16:00

China	1–1	Austria
Zou 16'	Report	Buchta 5'
Penalties
Ma (penalty shoot-out missed); Gu (penalty shoot-out missed); Zou (penalty shoot-out scored); Zou (penalty shoot-out missed); Ma (penalty shoot-out scored)	2–1	(penalty shoot-out scored) Czech; (penalty shoot-out missed) Klausbruckner; (penalty shoot-out missed) Herzog; (penalty shoot-out missed) Czech; (penalty shoot-out missed) Klausbruckner

Umpires:
Rhiannon Murrie (AUS)
Gemma Calderon (ESP)

12 October 2018
17:00

Argentina	3–0	Namibia
Rübenacker 2'; Bruggesser 8', 20'	Report

Umpires:
Sophie Bockelmann (GER)
Margaux Brand (CAN)

==== Fifth- to eighth-place classification ====
Crossover
13 October 2018
Namibia	1
Australia	5
13 October 2018
Poland	1
Austria	3

Fifth-place match
14 October 2018
Australia	3
Austria	0
Seventh-place match
14 October 2018
Namibia	1
Poland	3

==== Crossover ====
13 October 2018
11:00

Namibia	1–5	Australia
Myburgh 9'	Report	Schonell 2', 6'; Smith 5', 9'; Duncan 11'

Umpires:
Jianjun Chen (CHN)
Ayu Zainuddin (MAS)

13 October 2018
12:00

Poland	1–3	Austria
Balcerzak 20'	Report	Klausbruckner 8'; Felber 10'; Herzog 17'

==== Seventh and eighth place ====
14 October 2018
09:30

Namibia	1–3	Poland
Cormack 15'	Report	Balcerzak 5'; Zimmermann 15', 20'

Umpires:
Margaux Brand (CAN)
Cynthia Clement (GHA)

==== Fifth and sixth place ====
14 October 2018
11:30

Australia	3–0	Austria
Schonell 10', 13'; Lawton 16'	Report

Umpires:
Jianjun Chen (CHN)
Lize Strydom (RSA)

==== Semi-finals ====
13 October 2018
16:00

India	3–0	China
Khan 1'; Reet 5'; Lalremsiami 20'	Report

Umpires:
Lizé Srtydom (RSA)
Victoria Pazos (PAR)

13 October 2018
17:00

Argentina	11–0	South Africa
Cerundolo 7', 20' di Santo 9', 18'; Rübenacker 10', 10', 19'; Palet 13', 15'; Bruggesser 14', 17'	Report

Umpires:
Rhiannon Murrie (AUS)
Sophie Bockelmann (GER)

==== Bronze-medal match ====
14 October 2018
14:00

South Africa	0–6	China (bronze)
	Report	Gu 2'; Zou 7', 20'; Yu 13'; Ma 14'; Cai 15'

Umpires:
Victoria Pazos (PAR)
Fatma Mahmoud (EGY)

==== Gold-medal match ====
14 October 2018
16:30

(gold) Argentina	3–1	India (silver)
Palet 7'; Ramallo 10'; Bruggesser 12'	Report	Khan 1'

Umpires:
Sophie Bockelmann (GER)
Rhiannon Murrie (AUS)

== Statistics ==
=== Final ranking ===
Rank	Team	Competitors
Gold medal	Argentina	Lourdes Pérez, Josefina Rubenacker, Brisa Bruggesser, María Cerúndolo, Celina di Santo, Victoria Miranda, Gianella Pallet, Sofía Ramallo, Azul Iritxity
Silver medal	India	Salima Tete, Reet, Baljeet Kaur, Ishika Chaudhary, Mumtaz Khan, Khushboo, Chetna, Bichu Kharibam, Lalremsiami Hmar
Bronze medal	China	Zhu Xinyi, Zhang Heyang, Gu Yangyan, Cao Ruirui, Zou Meirong, Ma Ning, Yu Anhui, Cai Wenqian, Fan Yunxia
4	South Africa	Mishka Ellis, Nepo Serage, Kayla de Waal, Ammaarah Hendricks, Jacolene McLaren, Samantha Smuts, Zimkhitha Weston, Angel Nkosi, Angela Welham
5	Australia	Caitlin Cooper, Indy Robertson, Naomi Duncan, Maddi Smith, Amy Lawton, Morgan Mathison, Jolie Sertorio, Grace Young, Courtney Schonell
6	Austria	Michaela Streb, Isabella Klausbruckner, Helene Herzog, Johanna Czech, Sophie Salat, Laura Kern, Lena Buchta, Fiona Felber, Sabrina Hruby
7	Poland	Nicole Chruszcz, Sandra Tatarczuk, Lena Skoczek, Aleksandra Kucharska, Julia Balcerzak, Oliwia Kucharska, Viktoria Zimmermann, Dzesika Mazur, Małgorzata Plewa
8	Namibia	Sonet Crous, Cele Wessels, Kiana-Che Cormack, Joane van Rooyen, Danja Meyer, Carien van Rooyen, Kaela Schimming, Jahntwa Kruger, Taramarie Myburgh
9	Uruguay	Victoria Bate, Victoria Jover, Agustina Martínez, Elisa Civetta, Pilar Oliveros, Magdalena Verga, Emilia Arías, Manuela Quiñones, Agustina Suárez
10	Zimbabwe	Munashe Dangare, Simone Herbst, Taya Trivella, Lilian Pope, Gugulethu Sithole, Alexei Terblanche, Mercedes Beekes, Natalie Terblanche, Adrienne Berkhout
11	Mexico	Nancy Gamboa, Dafne Gutiérrez, Sofía Pérez, Karen González, Karla Sosa, Dayana Cuevas, Daniela Ruiz, Nicole Verdugo, Carla Ramírez
12	Vanuatu	Delliah Aru, Anna Noal, Rosemary Hinge, Nerry Tugon, Tolsi Johny, Naomie Aru, Shania Kenni, Joana Yalou, Melody Nalin

=== Goalscorers ===
There were 269 goals scored in 44 matches, for an average of 6.11 goals per match.

14 goals

- (Argentina) Brisa Bruggesser
- (Australia) Courtney Schonell

13 goals

- (China) Ma Ning

11 goals

- (South Africa) Kayla de Waal

10 goals

- (Argentina) Gianella Palet
- (Argentina) Josefina Rübenacker
- (India) Mumtaz Khan

9 goals

- (India) Lalremsiami
- (Uruguay) Pilar Oliveros

8 goals

- (Argentina) Celina di Santo

7 goals

- (Argentina) Constanza Cerundolo
- (Argentina) Sofía Ramallo
- (Austria) Helene Herzog
- (China) Zou Meirong
- (China) Cai Wenqian

6 goals

- (Australia) Amy Lawton
- (Australia) Maddison Smith

5 goals

- (Austria) Isabella Klausbruckner
- (India) Reet
- (Namibia) Kiana-Che Cormack
- (Uruguay) Magdalena Verga

4 goals

- (Austria) Laura Kern
- (China) Yu Anhui
- (India) Salima Tete
- (Mexico) Dayana Cuevas
- (Namibia) Taramarie Myburgh
- (Poland) Julia Balcerzak
- (South Africa) Zimkhitha Weston
- (Zimbabwe) Alexei Terblanche

3 goals

- (Australia) Jolie Sertorio
- (Austria) Fiona Felber
- (China) Zhang Heyang
- (India) Chetna
- (India) Baljeet Kaur
- (Mexico) Carla Ramírez
- (South Africa) Angel Nkosi
- (Uruguay) Manuela Quiñones
- (Uruguay) Agustina Suárez

2 goals

- (Argentina) Victoria Miranda
- (Australia) Naomi Duncan
- (Australia) Grace Young
- (Austria) Johanna Czech
- (China) Gu Yangyan
- (India) Ishika Chaudhary
- (Mexico) Karen Gonzalez
- (Poland) Dzesika Mazur
- (Poland) Viktoria Zimmermann
- (South Africa) Angela Welham
- (South Africa) Jacolene McLaren
- (Uruguay) Victoria Jover

1 goal

- (Australia) Morgan Mathison
- (Austria) Sabrina Hruby
- (Austria) Lena Buchta
- (Mexico) Nicole Verdugo
- (Namibia) Kaela Schimming
- (Namibia) Joane van Rooyen
- (Uruguay) Emilia Arias
- (Uruguay) Elisa Civetta
- (Uruguay) Agustina Martinez
- (Zimbabwe) Simone Herbst
- (Zimbabwe) Natalie Terblanche

Source: FIH
