= 3x3 basketball at the 2018 Summer Youth Olympics =

3x3 basketball at the III Summer Youth Olympic Games
- Venue: Parque Mujeres Argentinas
- Dates: 7–17 October
- No. of events: 4 (2 boys, 2 girls)
- Competitors: 160 (80 boys, 80 girls) from 33 nations
- Teams: 40

Basketball at the 2018 Summer Youth Olympics was held from 7 to 17 October. The events took place at the Parque Mujeres Argentinas in Buenos Aires, Argentina. As in previous Youth Olympic games, the 3x3 format is used along with the skill challenge.

== Qualification ==
Each National Olympic Committee (NOC) can enter a maximum of 2 teams, 1 team of 4 athletes per each gender. As hosts, Argentina was given 2 teams, 1 per each gender. The winner of the men's and women's 2017 U18 3x3 World Cup qualified to the Youth Olympics. Afterwards, the top 8 unqualified teams from each gender in the FIBA U18 3x3 National Federation Rankings (updated on 1 April 2018) qualified to the Youth Olympics. The remaining 10 teams qualified through the national rankings with the following restrictions; no more than 10 nations from the same continent can participate in one tournament and a minimum of 30 NOCs must participate across all events.

To be eligible to participate at the Youth Olympics athletes must have been born between 1 January 2000 and 31 December 2002. Furthermore, all team members must have participated in two FIBA sanctioned 3x3 events between 31 July 2017 and 31 July 2018 and all national federations must have organized at least three FIBA endorsed events between 1 April 2017 and 1 April 2018.

The teams were officially confirmed on April 5, 2018.

== Qualification summary ==
NOC	Boys	Girls	Total athletes
Andorra	X	X	8
Argentina	X	X	8
Australia		X	4
Belgium	X		4
Brazil	X		4
China	X	X	8
Czech Republic		X	4
Egypt		X	4
Estonia	X	X	8
France		X	4
Georgia	X		4
Germany		X	4
Hungary		X	4
Indonesia		X	4
Iran		X	4
Italy	X		4
Jordan	X		4
Kazakhstan	X		4
Kyrgyzstan	X		4
Latvia	X		4
Mexico		X	4
Mongolia	X		4
New Zealand	X		4
Netherlands		X	4
Romania		X	4
Russia	X		4
Slovenia	X		4
Spain		X	4
Sri Lanka		X	4
Turkmenistan	X		4
Ukraine	X	X	8
United States	X	X	8
Venezuela	X	X	8
Total: 33 NOCs	20	20	160

Event	Location	Date	Total Places	Boys Qualified	Girls Qualified
Host Nation	-	-	1	Argentina	Argentina
2017 FIBA 3x3 U18 World Cup	(China) Chengdu	28 Jun–2 Jul 2017	1	Belgium	United States
FIBA U18 3x3 National Federation Ranking	-	1 April 2018	Top 8	Venezuela; China; Ukraine; United States; Italy; Estonia; Latvia; Andorra	China; Andorra; Ukraine; Venezuela; Estonia; Hungary; France; Romania
FIBA U18 3x3 National Federation Ranking	-	1 April 2018	10	Jordan; Slovenia; Kazakhstan; Mongolia; Kyrgyzstan; Turkmenistan; Russia; Georgia; Brazil; New Zealand	Netherlands; Egypt; Czech Republic; ~~Japan~~; Sri Lanka; Indonesia; Spain; Germany; Mexico; Australia; Iran*
TOTAL			20		

* Replaced Japan

== Format ==
The boys' and girls' tournaments have the same format. Twenty teams are divided into four pools of five teams. Each team plays every other team in the same pool. The top two ranked teams in each pool proceed to the knockout stage and the losers are eliminated.

== Medal summary ==
=== Medal table ===
* Host nation (Argentina)

Rank	Nation	Gold	Silver	Bronze	Total
1	Argentina*	2	0	1	3
2	France	1	1	0	2
3	United States	1	0	0	1
4	Belgium	0	1	0	1
4	Czech Republic	0	1	0	1
4	Russia	0	1	0	1
7	Australia	0	0	1	1
7	Italy	0	0	1	1
7	Slovenia	0	0	1	1
Totals (9 entries)		4	4	4	12

=== Events ===
Event	Gold	Silver	Bronze
Boys' tournament	Argentina; Juan Hierrezuelo; Fausto Ruesga; Juan De la Fuente; Marco Giordano	Belgium; Sasha Deheneffe; Ferre Vanderhoydonck; Sam Hofman; Moussa Noterman	Slovenia; Jan Razdevšek; Dan Osrečki; Erik Groznik; Adrian Hirschmann
Girls' tournament	United States; Paige Bueckers; Hailey Van Lith; Samantha Brunelle; Aliyah Boston	France; Diaba Konaté; Mathilde Peyregne; Eve de Christophie Mahoutou; Olivia Yale	Australia; Alexandra Fowler; Ruby Porter; Sara-Rose Smith; Suzi-Rose Deegan
Boys' dunk contest	Fausto Ruesga; Argentina	Nikita Remizov; Russia	Niccolò Filoni; Italy
Girls' shoot-out contest	Mathilde Peyregne; France	Kateřina Galíčková; Czech Republic	Sofía Acevedo; Argentina
