= Swimming at the 2018 European Aquatics Championships – Women's 1500 metre freestyle =

Women's 1500 metre freestyle at the 2018 European Aquatics Championships
- Venue: Tollcross International Swimming Centre
- Dates: 6 August (heats); 7 August (final)
- Competitors: 15 from 12 nations
- Winning time: 15:51.61

Medalists
gold medal	Simona Quadarella	Italy
silver medal	Sarah Köhler	Germany
bronze medal	Ajna Késely	Hungary

The Women's 1500 metre freestyle competition of the 2018 European Aquatics Championships was held on 6 and 7 August 2018.

== Records ==
Before the competition, the existing world and championship records were as follows.

	Name	Nation	Time	Location	Date
World record	Katie Ledecky	United States	15:20.48	Indianapolis	16 May 2018
European record	Lotte Friis	Denmark	15:38.88	Barcelona	30 July 2013
Championship record	Boglárka Kapás	Hungary	15:50.22	London	21 May 2016

== Results ==
=== Heats ===
The heats were started on 6 August at 10:48.

Rank	Heat	Lane	Name	Nationality	Time	Notes
1	2	4	Simona Quadarella	Italy	16:05.33	Q
2	1	4	Sarah Köhler	Germany	16:06.72	Q
3	2	5	Ajna Késely	Hungary	16:19.14	Q
4	1	5	Julia Hassler	Liechtenstein	16:19.89	Q
5	2	2	Tjaša Oder	Slovenia	16:21.82	Q
6	1	3	Jimena Pérez	Spain	16:25.02	Q
7	2	6	Tamila Holub	Portugal	16:25.29	Q
8	1	6	Celine Rieder	Germany	16:27.79	Q
9	2	3	Diana Durães	Portugal	16:36.03	
10	2	1	Helena Bach	Denmark	16:48.05	
11	1	2	Marlene Kahler	Austria	16:49.10	
12	1	7	Maria Grandt	Denmark	16:54.92	
13	1	1	Arianna Valloni	San Marino	16:59.16	
14	2	8	Beril Böcekler	Turkey	17:00.94	
15	1	8	Hanna Eriksson	Sweden	17:25.11	
	2	7	Katja Fain	Slovenia	Did not start	

=== Final ===
The final was started on 7 August at 16:30.

Rank	Lane	Name	Nationality	Time	Notes
1st place, gold medalist(s)	4	Simona Quadarella	Italy	15:51.61	
2nd place, silver medalist(s)	5	Sarah Köhler	Germany	15:57.85	
3rd place, bronze medalist(s)	3	Ajna Késely	Hungary	16:03.22	
4	2	Tjaša Oder	Slovenia	16:10.46	
5	6	Julia Hassler	Liechtenstein	16:14.15	
6	7	Jimena Pérez	Spain	16:16.41	
7	1	Tamila Holub	Portugal	16:26.82	
8	8	Celine Rieder	Germany	16:26.83	
