= Swimming at the 2018 Summer Youth Olympics – Girls' 400 metre freestyle =

Girls' 400 metre freestyle at the 2018 Summer Youth Olympics
- Venue: Natatorium
- Dates: 12 October
- Competitors: 26 from 22 nations
- Winning time: 4:07.14

Medalists
gold medal	Ajna Késely	Hungary
silver medal	Delfina Pignatiello	Argentina
bronze medal	Marlene Kahler	Austria

The girls' 400 metre freestyle event at the 2018 Summer Youth Olympics took place on 12 October at the Natatorium in Buenos Aires, Argentina.

== Results ==
=== Heats ===
The heats were started at 10:52.

Rank	Heat	Lane	Name	Nationality	Time	Notes
1	4	4	Ajna Késely	Hungary	4:10.74	Q
2	3	4	Delfina Pignatiello	Argentina	4:11.86	Q
3	4	5	Marlene Kahler	Austria	4:13.10	Q
4	2	5	Nicole Oliva	Philippines	4:16.72	Q
5	3	2	Duné Coetzee	South Africa	4:16.73	Q
6	4	7	Kaitlynn Sims	United States	4:16.91	Q
7	4	1	Delfina Dini	Argentina	4:17.00	Q
8	3	8	Andrea Galisteo	Spain	4:17.07	Q
9	4	8	Erika Fairweather	New Zealand	4:17.43	
10	2	4	Gan Ching Hwee	Singapore	4:17.86	
11	3	3	Celine Rieder	Germany	4:18.10	
12	3	6	Rafaela Raurich	Brazil	4:18.71	
13	3	5	Petra Barócsai	Hungary	4:18.95	
14	3	7	Tinky Ho	Hong Kong	4:19.49	
15	4	6	Maddie Donohoe	United States	4:19.54	
16	2	3	Malene Rypestøl	Norway	4:21.28	
17	3	1	Aleksandra Knop	Poland	4:22.09	
18	4	2	Kate Beavon	South Africa	4:22.48	
19	4	3	Anja Crevar	Serbia	4:22.89	
20	2	6	Samantha Bello	Peru	4:23.27	
21	2	1	Ieva Maļuka	Latvia	4:24.64	
22	2	2	Arianna Valloni	San Marino	4:26.87	
23	2	7	Alexandra Frazão	Portugal	4:27.00	
24	1	4	Sandy Atef	Egypt	4:30.88	
25	1	5	Natalia Kuipers	Virgin Islands	4:45.60	
26	1	3	Katie Rock	Albania	4:50.72	

=== Final ===
The final was held at 19:13.

Rank	Lane	Name	Nationality	Time	Notes
1st place, gold medalist(s)	4	Ajna Késely	Hungary	4:07.14	
2nd place, silver medalist(s)	5	Delfina Pignatiello	Argentina	4:10.40	
3rd place, bronze medalist(s)	3	Marlene Kahler	Austria	4:12.48	
4	2	Duné Coetzee	South Africa	4:15.27	
5	7	Kaitlynn Sims	United States	4:15.53	
6	6	Nicole Oliva	Philippines	4:16.61	
7	8	Andrea Galisteo	Spain	4:16.91	
8	1	Delfina Dini	Argentina	4:19.25	
