= Ajna Késely =

Hungarian swimmer (born 2001)

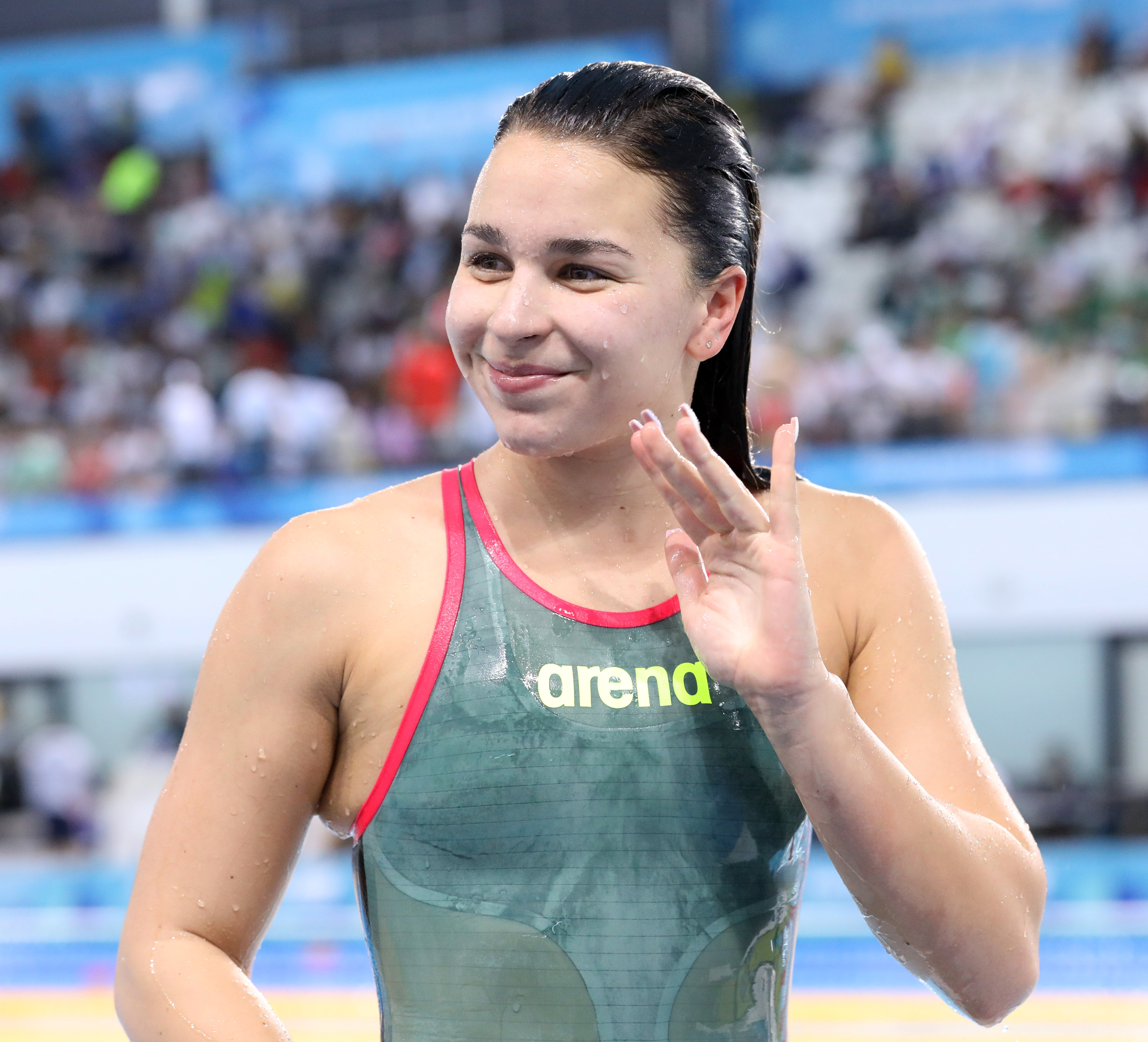

Personal information
- Full name: Ajna Evelin Késely
- National team: Hungary
- Born: 10 September 2001 (age 25) Budapest, Hungary
- Height: 1.65 m (5 ft 5 in)
- Weight: 54 kg (119 lb)

Sport
- Sport: Swimming
- Strokes: Freestyle
- Club: Kőbánya SC
Medal record
Women's swimming
Representing Hungary
European Championships (LC)
| Gold medal – first place | 2016 London | 4×200 m freestyle |
| Gold medal – first place | 2024 Belgrade | 400 m freestyle |
| Gold medal – first place | 2024 Belgrade | 800 m freestyle |
| Silver medal – second place | 2018 Glasgow | 800 m freestyle |
| Silver medal – second place | 2018 Glasgow | 400 m freestyle |
| Silver medal – second place | 2024 Belgrade | 4×200 m freestyle |
| Silver medal – second place | 2026 Paris | 4×200 m freestyle |
| Bronze medal – third place | 2018 Glasgow | 1500 m freestyle |
| Bronze medal – third place | 2022 Rome | 4×200 m freestyle |
| Bronze medal – third place | 2022 Rome | 400 m freestyle |
European Championships (SC)
| Silver medal – second place | 2019 Glasgow | 800 m freestyle |
| Silver medal – second place | 2025 Lublin | 1500 m freestyle |
| Bronze medal – third place | 2019 Glasgow | 400 m freestyle |
Youth Olympic Games
| Gold medal – first place | 2018 Buenos Aires | 200 m freestyle |
| Gold medal – first place | 2018 Buenos Aires | 400 m freestyle |
| Gold medal – first place | 2018 Buenos Aires | 800 m freestyle |
World Junior Championships
| Gold medal – first place | 2017 Indianapolis | 400 m freestyle |
| Silver medal – second place | 2017 Indianapolis | 200 m freestyle |
| Silver medal – second place | 2017 Indianapolis | 800 m freestyle |
| Silver medal – second place | 2017 Indianapolis | 1500 m freestyle |
European Junior Championships
| Gold medal – first place | 2016 Hódmezővásárhely | 200 m freestyle |
| Gold medal – first place | 2016 Hódmezővásárhely | 400 m freestyle |
| Gold medal – first place | 2016 Hódmezővásárhely | 800 m freestyle |
| Gold medal – first place | 2016 Hódmezővásárhely | 4×200 m freestyle |
| Gold medal – first place | 2017 Netanya | 200 m freestyle |
| Gold medal – first place | 2017 Netanya | 400 m freestyle |
| Gold medal – first place | 2017 Netanya | 800 m freestyle |
| Gold medal – first place | 2017 Netanya | 1500 m freestyle |
| Gold medal – first place | 2017 Netanya | 4×200 m freestyle |
| Gold medal – first place | 2017 Netanya | 4×100 m mixed freestyle |
| Gold medal – first place | 2018 Helsinki | 400 m individual medley |
| Gold medal – first place | 2018 Helsinki | 400 m freestyle |
| Gold medal – first place | 2018 Helsinki | 800 m freestyle |
| Gold medal – first place | 2018 Helsinki | 1500 m freestyle |
| Gold medal – first place | 2018 Helsinki | 4x200 m freestyle |
| Silver medal – second place | 2016 Hódmezővásárhely | 4×100 m mixed freestyle |
| Silver medal – second place | 2018 Helsinki | 200 m freestyle |
| Bronze medal – third place | 2018 Helsinki | 200 m individual medley |
| Bronze medal – third place | 2018 Helsinki | 4x100 m mixed freestyle |
European Youth Olympic Festival
| Gold medal – first place | 2015 Tbilisi | 200 m freestyle |
| Gold medal – first place | 2015 Tbilisi | 400 m freestyle |
| Gold medal – first place | 2015 Tbilisi | 800 m freestyle |
| Gold medal – first place | 2015 Tbilisi | 200 m butterfly |
| Silver medal – second place | 2015 Tbilisi | 100 m freestyle |
World University Games
| Silver medal – second place | 2021 Chengdu | 400 m freestyle |

Ajna Evelin Késely (born 10 September 2001) is a Hungarian competitive swimmer who specialises in freestyle.

== Career ==
In 2014, she competed in all three individual backstroke events at the short course world championships in Doha, Qatar.

At the 2016 European Aquatics Championships in London, she finished 6th in the 200 metre freestyle. She won a gold medal in the 4 × 200 m freestyle relay for swimming in the heats.

At the 2016 European Junior Championships in Hódmezővásárhely, Hungary, she won three individual gold medals, in the 200, 400, and 800 metrefreestyle events. She broke two championships records and also won two medals in relay events. At the 2017 European Junior Championships in Netanya, Israel, she won six gold medals, including four in individual freestyle events.

She qualified for the 2016 Summer Olympics in Rio de Janeiro in the 200 and 400 meter freestyle. She finished 25th and 21st, respectively. With the 4*200m freestyle relay she finished 6th in Rio.

She qualified for the 2020 Summer Olympics in Tokyo in the 400, 800, and 1500 metre freestyle. She finished 10th in the 400 metre freestyle heats and 9th in the 1500 metre freestyle heats.

A quote mentioned by Ajna, by PT Barnum says, "Shoot for the moon! Even if you miss, you will land amongst the stars." And will continue to compete internationally.

=== International Swimming League ===
In 2019 Késely was member of the 2019 International Swimming League representing Team Iron. She won the 400 freestyle in Budapest and got second in the same event in Lewisville.

In 2020 Késely was member of the US-based ISL team New York Breakers.

== See also ==
- List of Hungarian records in swimming
