= San Marino at the 2018 Summer Youth Olympics =

- IOC code: SMR
- NOC: Comitato Olimpico Nazionale Sammarinese

in Buenos Aires, Argentina 6 – 18 October 2018
- Competitors: 4 in 3 sports
- Medals: Gold 0 Silver 0 Bronze 0 Total 0

Summer Youth Olympics appearances
- 2010; 2014; 2018

San Marino participated at the 2018 Summer Youth Olympics in Buenos Aires, Argentina from 6 October to 18 October 2018.

== Archery ==
San Marino qualified one athlete.

Individual

| Athlete | Event | Ranking round | | Round of 32 | Round of 16 | Quarterfinals | Semifinals | Final / BM | Rank |
| Athlete | Event | Score | Seed | Opposition Score | Opposition Score | Opposition Score | Opposition Score | Opposition Score | Rank |
|---|---|---|---|---|---|---|---|---|---|
| Leonardo Tura | Boys' Individual | 584 | 32 | Song In-jun (KOR); L 2-6 | did not advance | | | | |

Team

| Athletes | Event | Ranking round | | Round of 32 | Round of 16 | Quarterfinals | Semifinals | Final / BM | Rank |
| Athletes | Event | Score | Seed | Opposition Score | Opposition Score | Opposition Score | Opposition Score | Opposition Score | Rank |
|---|---|---|---|---|---|---|---|---|---|
| Zhang Mengyao (CHN); Leonardo Tura (SMR) | Mixed Team | 1259 | 32 | Amr Said Mohamed Azzam (EGY); Potrafke (GER); L 1–5 | did not advance | | | | 17 |

== Swimming ==
San Marino qualified two athletes.

| Athlete | Event | Heats | | Semifinals | | Final | |
| Athlete | Event | Time | Rank | Time | Rank | Time | Rank |
|---|---|---|---|---|---|---|---|
| Raffaele Tamagnini | Boys' 50 metre freestyle | 24.87 | 38 | did not advance | | | |
| Raffaele Tamagnini | Boys' 100 metre freestyle | 55.55 | 39 | did not advance | | | |
| Arianna Valloni | Girls' 400 metre freestyle | 4:26.87 | 22 | —N/a | | did not advance | |
| Arianna Valloni | Girls' 800 metre freestyle | 8:57.00 | 15 | —N/a | | did not advance | |

== Table tennis ==
San Marino qualified one athlete.

| Athlete | Event | Group stage | | Round of 16 | Quarterfinals | Semifinals | Final / BM | |
| Athlete | Event | Opposition Score | Rank | Opposition Score | Opposition Score | Opposition Score | Opposition Score | Rank |
|---|---|---|---|---|---|---|---|---|
| Chiara Morri | Girls' singles | Gauthier (FRA) L 0–4; Blašková (CZE) L 0–4; Sun (CHN) L 0–4 | 4 | did not advance | | | | |
| Intercontinental–5; Chiara Morri (SMR); Santiago Lorenzo (ARG) | Mixed team | France L 0–3; Azerbaijan L 0–3; India L 0–3 | 4 | did not advance | | | | |
