= 3x3 Basketball at the 2018 Summer Youth Olympics – Boys' dunk contest =

Boys' dunk contest at the III Summer Youth Olympic Games
- Venue: Parque Mujeres Argentinas
- Date: 15 October
- Competitors: 12 from 12 nations

Medalists
1st place, gold medalist(s)		Fausto Ruesga	Argentina
2nd place, silver medalist(s)		Nikita Remizov	Russia
3rd place, bronze medalist(s)		Niccolò Filoni	Italy

Boys' dunk contest at the 2018 Summer Youth Olympics was held on 15 October 2018 at the Parque Mujeres Argentinas in Buenos Aires.

== Results ==
=== Qualification ===
Rank	Name	Nationality	Round 1	Round 2	Total	Notes
1	Fausto Ruesga	Argentina	24	27	51	Q
2	Carson McCorkle	United States	26	24	50	Q
2	Nikita Remizov	Russia	24	26	50	Q
4	Niccolò Filoni	Italy	24	25	49	Q
5	Niks Salenieks	Latvia	22	24	46	
6	Aieser Pereira	Brazil	24	21	45	
7	Dan Osrečki	Slovenia	21	21	42	
8	Sasha Deheneffe	Belgium	19	19	38	
9	Albert Pons	Andorra	21	0	21	
9	Wang Yunzhang	China	0	21	21	
	Denis Gerashchenko	Kyrgyzstan			DNS	
	Omar Márquez	Venezuela			DNS	

=== Semifinal ===
Rank	Name	Nationality	Round 1	Round 2	Total	Notes
1	Nikita Remizov	Russia	24	27	51*	Q
2	Fausto Ruesga	Argentina	24	27	51*	Q
3rd place, bronze medalist(s)	Niccolò Filoni	Italy	27	24	51*	
4	Carson McCorkle	United States	23	24	47	

=== Final ===
Rank	Name	Nationality	Round 1	Round 2	Round 3	Total
1st place, gold medalist(s)	Fausto Ruesga	Argentina	27	26	28	51*
2nd place, silver medalist(s)	Nikita Remizov	Russia	27	27	27	51*
