= 3x3 Basketball at the 2018 Summer Youth Olympics – Girls' shoot-out contest =

Youth Olympic Games event

Girls' shoot-out contest at the III Summer Youth Olympic Games
- Venue: Parque Mujeres Argentinas
- Date: 15 October
- Competitors: 36 from 20 nations

Medalists
1st place, gold medalist(s)		Mathilde Peyregne	France
2nd place, silver medalist(s)		Kateřina Galíčková	Czech Republic
3rd place, bronze medalist(s)		Sofía Acevedo	Argentina

Girls' shoot-out contest at the 2018 Summer Youth Olympics was held on 15 October 2018 at the Parque Mujeres Argentinas in Buenos Aires.

== Results ==
Pos.	Athlete	Country	Qualification		Final	
Pos.	Athlete	Country	Pts.	Time (s)	Pts.	Time (s)
1st place, gold medalist(s)	Mathilde Peyregne	France	6	30.0	9	49.4
2nd place, silver medalist(s)	Kateřina Galíčková	Czech Republic	5	25.3	8	43.6
3rd place, bronze medalist(s)	Sofía Acevedo	Argentina	9	25.2	8	48.1
4	Paige Bueckers	United States	7	26.7	4	45.8
5	Karina Esquer	Mexico	5	26.3	Did not advance	
6	Aliz Varga	Hungary	5	26.5	Did not advance	
7	Samantha Brunelle	United States	5	27.3	Did not advance	
8	Nathania Orville	Indonesia	5	29.7	Did not advance	
9	Yuliia Hutevych	Ukraine	5	30.0	Did not advance	
10	Orsolya Tóth	Hungary	5	30.0	Did not advance	
11	Sara-Rose Smith	Australia	4	24.4	Did not advance	
12	Zhang Rui	China	4	25.6	Did not advance	
13	Janne Pulk	Estonia	4	27.3	Did not advance	
14	Ding Kangchen	China	4	27.6	Did not advance	
15	Fatemeh Aghazadegan	Iran	4	29.4	Did not advance	
16	Nouran Khaled Abdelrafea Ibrahim	Egypt	4	29.5	Did not advance	
17	Luisanny Zapata	Venezuela	4	30.0	Did not advance	
18	Maria Ferariu	Romania	3	26.0	Did not advance	
19	Florencia Chagas	Argentina	3	26.7	Did not advance	
20	Kiki Fleuren	Netherlands	3	26.7	Did not advance	
21	Carla Popescu	Romania	3	28.0	Did not advance	
22	Leia Hamza	Sri Lanka	3	28.3	Did not advance	
23	Olivia Yale	France	3	29.6	Did not advance	
24	Enas Tawheed	Egypt	3	29.9	Did not advance	
25	Odeth Betancourt	Venezuela	3	30.0	Did not advance	
26	Fatemeh Bidar	Iran	3	30.0	Did not advance	
27	Anna Rosecká	Czech Republic	2	25.5	Did not advance	
28	Emily Enochs	Germany	2	27.1	Did not advance	
29	Robyn Bouwer	Netherlands	2	27.7	Did not advance	
30	Júlia Marquez	Andorra	2	28.7	Did not advance	
31	Johanna Teder	Estonia	2	30.0	Did not advance	
32	Estel Puiggros	Spain	1	26.0	Did not advance	
33	Helena Eckerle	Germany	1	28.1	Did not advance	
34	Rashmi Perera	Sri Lanka	1	29.5	Did not advance	
35	Silvia Bardají	Andorra	1	30.0	Did not advance	
36	Mama Dembele	Spain	0	30.0	Did not advance	
	Martha Tapia	Mexico	DNS		Did not advance	
