= Swimming at the 2018 Summer Youth Olympics – Girls' 800 metre freestyle =

Girls' 800 metre freestyle at the 2018 Summer Youth Olympics
- Venue: Natatorium
- Dates: 9 October
- Competitors: 21 from 19 nations
- Winning time: 8:27.60

Medalists
gold medal	Ajna Késely	Hungary
silver medal	Delfina Pignatiello	Argentina
bronze medal	Marlene Kahler	Austria

The girls' 800 metre freestyle event at the 2018 Summer Youth Olympics took place on 9 October at the Natatorium in Buenos Aires, Argentina.

== Results ==
The heats were started at 10:00 and 18:00.

Rank	Heat	Lane	Name	Nationality	Time	Notes
1st place, gold medalist(s)	3	5	Ajna Késely	Hungary	8:27.60	
2nd place, silver medalist(s)	3	4	Delfina Pignatiello	Argentina	8:32.42	
3rd place, bronze medalist(s)	3	2	Marlene Kahler	Austria	8:36.57	
4	3	8	Delfina Dini	Argentina	8:43.71	
5	3	3	Celine Rieder	Germany	8:43.73	
6	2	3	Gan Ching Hwee	Singapore	8:44.69	
7	3	1	Kaitlynn Sims	United States	8:46.40	
8	2	6	María Román	Colombia	8:48.88	
9	3	6	Maddie Donohoe	United States	8:48.96	
10	3	7	Andrea Galisteo	Spain	8:49.85	
11	2	5	Nicole Oliva	Philippines	8:52.29	
12	2	1	Malene Rypestøl	Norway	8:54.64	
13	2	2	Samantha Bello	Peru	8:54.89	
14	1	4	Erika Fairweather	New Zealand	8:56.14	
15	1	5	Arianna Valloni	San Marino	8:57.00	
16	2	4	Kate Beavon	South Africa	8:59.60	
17	2	7	Tinky Ho	Hong Kong	9:02.08	
18	2	8	Alexandra Frazão	Portugal	9:05.25	
19	1	3	Sandy Atef	Egypt	9:16.73	
20	1	6	Vasiliki Kadoglu	Bulgaria	9:18.92	
21	1	2	Jennifer Ramírez	Honduras	9:28.18	
