= Caterina Benedetti =

Argentine beach handball player (born 2000)

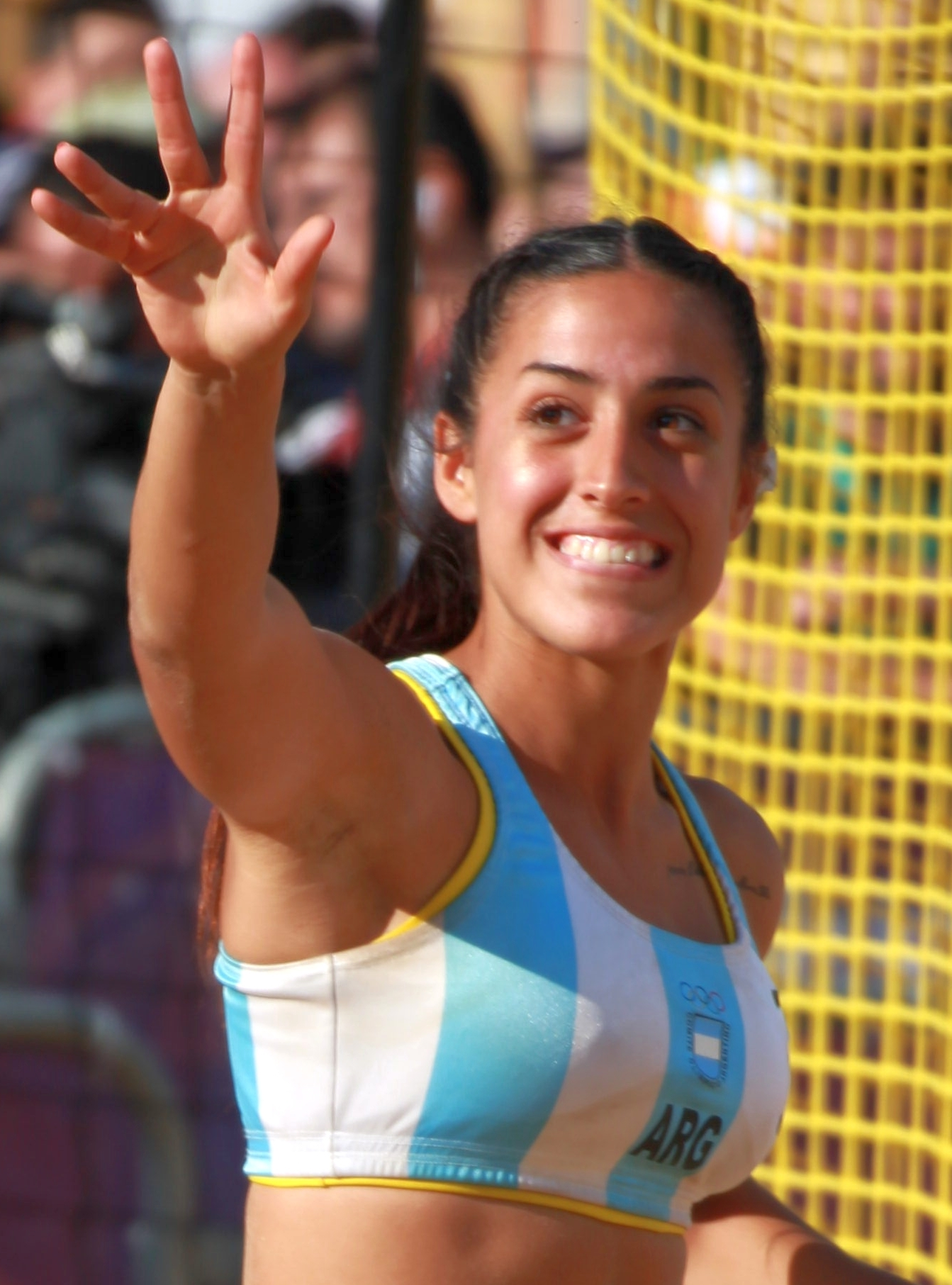
- Benedetti at the 2018 Summer Youth Olympics.

Personal information
- Full name: Caterina Benedetti Gorga
- Nickname: Cati Benedetti
- National team: Argentina women's national beach handball team
- Born: May 15, 2000 (age 26) Buenos Aires, Argentina
- Height: 1.62 m (5 ft 4 in)
- Weight: 61 kg (134 lb)

Sport
- Sport: Beach handball
- Position: Lateral
- Club: Ikasa Balonmano Madrid
- Team: Argentina women's national beach handball team
Medal record
Beach handball
Representing Argentina
Youth Olympic Games
Winner	2018 Summer Youth Olympics
South American Beach Games
Winner	2019 South American Beach Games

Caterina Benedetti Gorga (Buenos Aires, May 15, 2000) is an Argentine Beach handball player, who plays for Argentina women's national beach handball team.

== History ==
She was part of the team that won the bronze medal at the 2017 World Cup in Mauritius and won the Pan American Championship in Paraguay that same year.

At the 2018 Summer Youth Olympics held in Buenos Aires, Argentina, he represented her country in the beach handball discipline, a competition where she won the gold medal with her team defeating the Croatian women's team in the final.

At the 2019 South American Beach Games in Rosario, Argentina, she won a gold medal in beach handball, defeating the Brazilian women's team in the final.

== Career ==
Caterina Benedetti played for the following teams:

- (Argentina) Sociedad Escolar y Deportiva Alemana Lanús Oeste (2017-2020)
- (Spain) Club Balonmano Puerto del Carmen (2020-2021)
- (Spain) Club Balonmano Morvedre (2021-2022)
- (Spain) Club Deportivo Balonmano Aula (2022-2023)
- (Spain) Club Balonmano Pereda (2023-2024)
- (Spain) Club Deportivo Elemental iKasa Balónmano Madrid (2024-2025)

== Achievements ==
=== Podiums ===
Year	Place	Rival	Match score	Result
2018	Buenos Aires	Croatia women's national junior beach handball team	2–0	Gold
2019	Rosario	Brazil women's national beach handball team	7-6	Gold
2025	Alburquerque	Unas	2-0	Gold
