= Andorra at the 2018 Summer Youth Olympics =

- IOC code: AND
- NOC: Andorran Olympic Committee
- Website: http://www.coa.ad/

in Buenos Aires, Argentina 6 – 18 October 2018
- Competitors: 8 in 1 sport
- Medals: Gold 0 Silver 0 Bronze 0 Total 0

Summer Youth Olympics appearances (overview)
- 2010; 2014; 2018

Andorra participated at the 2018 Summer Youth Olympics in Buenos Aires, Argentina from 6 October to 18 October 2018.

== Basketball ==
Andorra qualified a boys' and girls' team based on the U18 3x3 National Federation Ranking.

Boys' tournament

Event	Group stage					Quarterfinal	Semifinal	Final / BM	
Event	Opposition Score	Opposition Score	Opposition Score	Opposition Score	Rank	Opposition Score	Opposition Score	Opposition Score	Rank
Boys' tournament	New Zealand; L 16–21	Ukraine; L 5–22	Venezuela; L 10–22	Brazil; L 8–15	5	did not advance			19

Girls' tournament

Event	Group stage					Quarterfinal	Semifinal	Final / BM	
Event	Opposition Score	Opposition Score	Opposition Score	Opposition Score	Rank	Opposition Score	Opposition Score	Opposition Score	Rank
Girls' tournament	France; L 7–22	Mexico; L 7–21	Indonesia; L 15–16	Argentina; L 5–21	5	did not advance			20

Girls' shoot-out contest

Athlete	Event	Qualification		Final	
Athlete	Event	Points	Rank	Points	Rank
Julia Marquez	Shoot-out contest	2	30	did not advance	
Silvia Bardaji	Shoot-out contest	1	35	did not advance	

Boys' dunk contest

Athlete	Event	Qualification		Semifinal		Final	
Athlete	Event	Points	Rank	Points	Rank	Points	Rank
Albert Pons	Dunk contest	21	9	did not advance			
