= Marlene Kahler =

Austrian swimmer (born 2001)

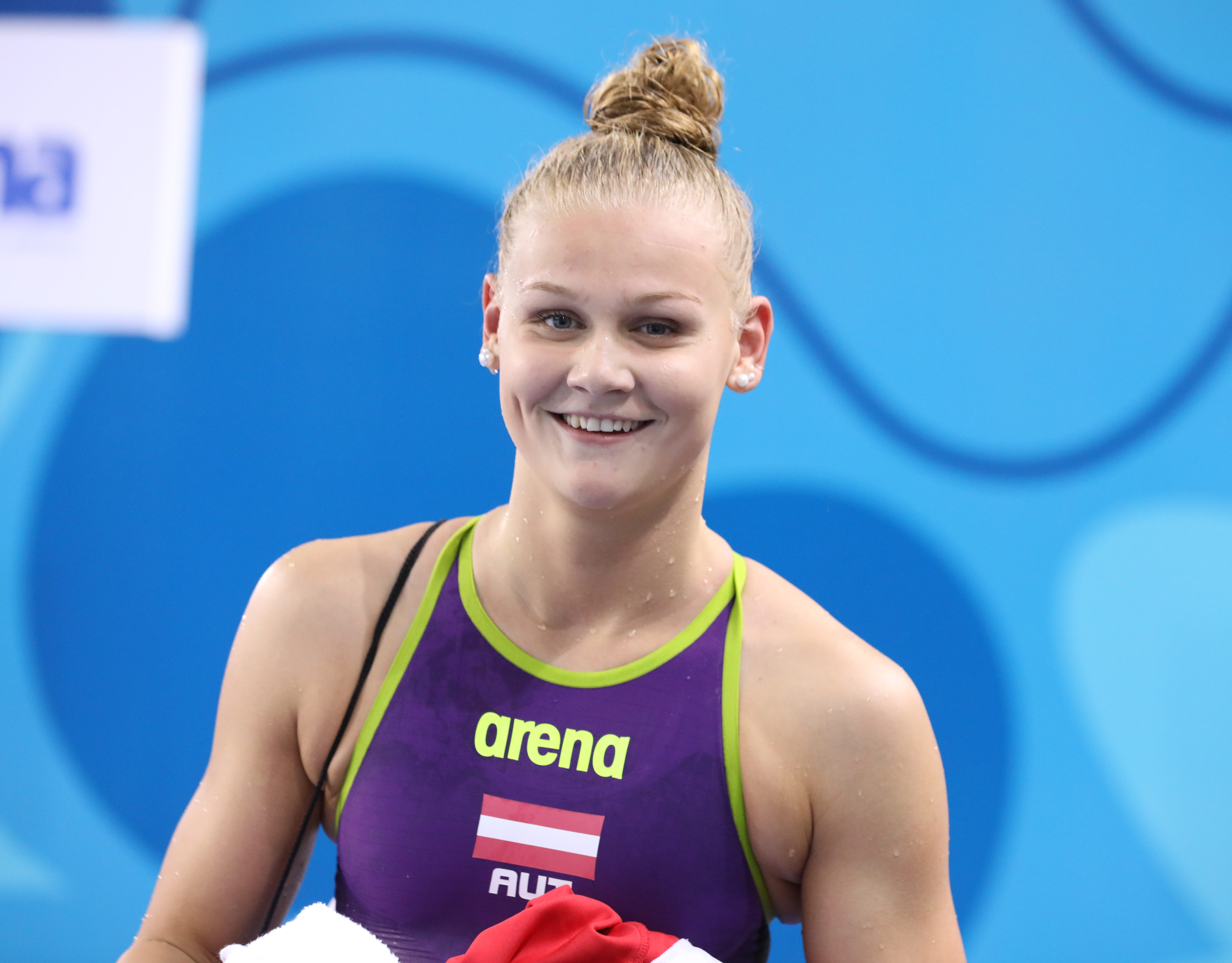
- Marlene Kahler in 2018

Personal information
- Nationality: Austrian
- Born: 15 May 2001 (age 25)

Sport
- Sport: Swimming
Medal record
Representing Austria
Youth Olympic Games
Bronze medal – third place	2018 Buenos Aires	400 m freestyle
Bronze medal – third place	2018 Buenos Aires	800 m freestyle
European Junior Championships
Bronze medal – third place	2018 Helsinki	400 m freestyle

Marlene Kahler (born 15 May 2001) is an Austrian swimmer. She competed in the women's 200 metre freestyle at the 2019 World Aquatics Championships. In 2021, she competed in the 2020 Olympics.
