= Lourdes Pérez Iturraspe =

Argentine field hockey player

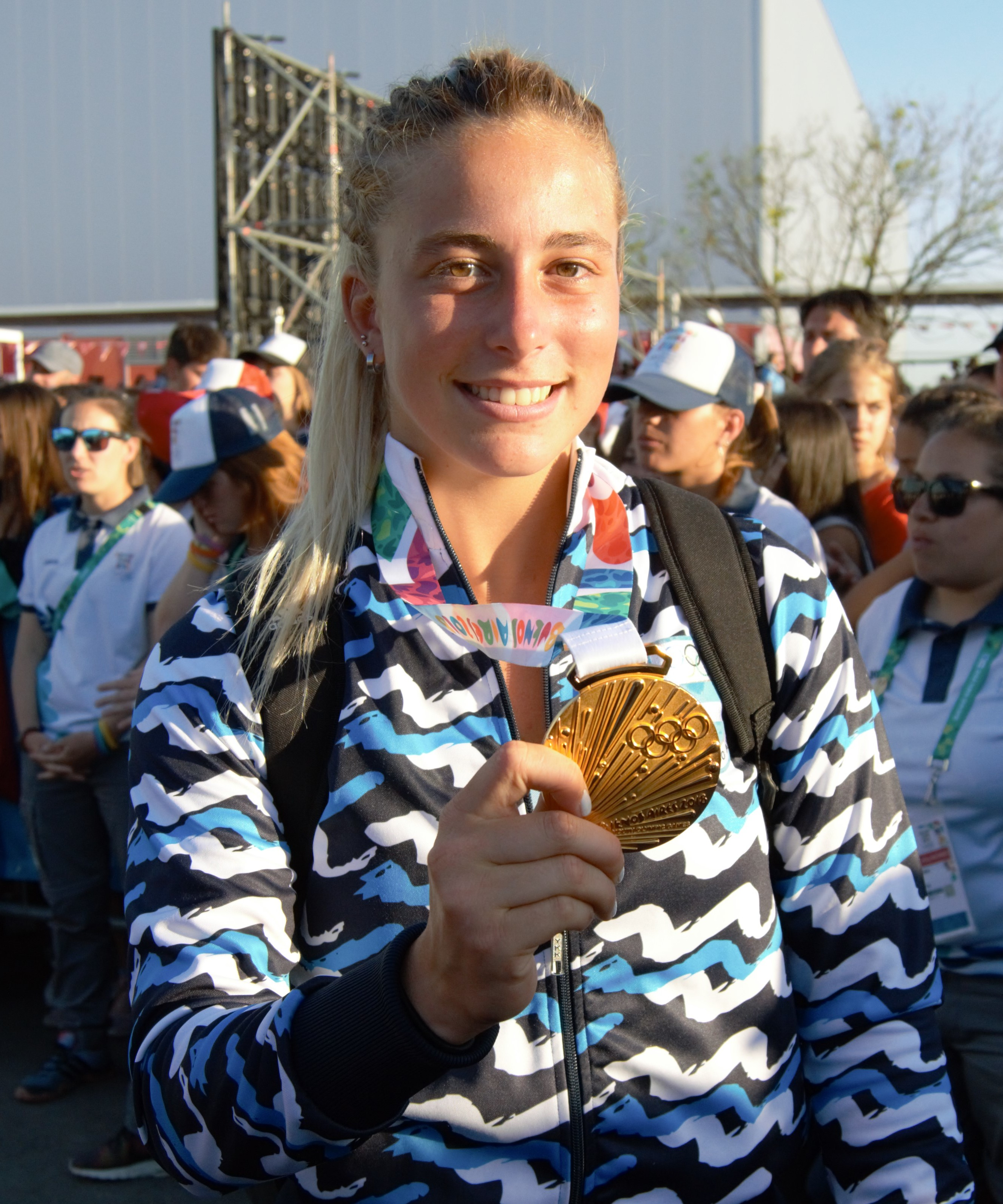

Personal information
- Born: 16 February 2000 (age 26) Buenos Aires, Argentina
- Height: 1.67 m (5 ft 6 in)
- Weight: 61 kg (134 lb)

Sport
- Sport: Field hockey
- Position: Goalkeeper
- Club: SIC
Senior career
Years	Team	Caps	Goals
–Present	SIC	-	-
National team
Years	Team	Caps	Goals
2022–Present	Argentina	0	-

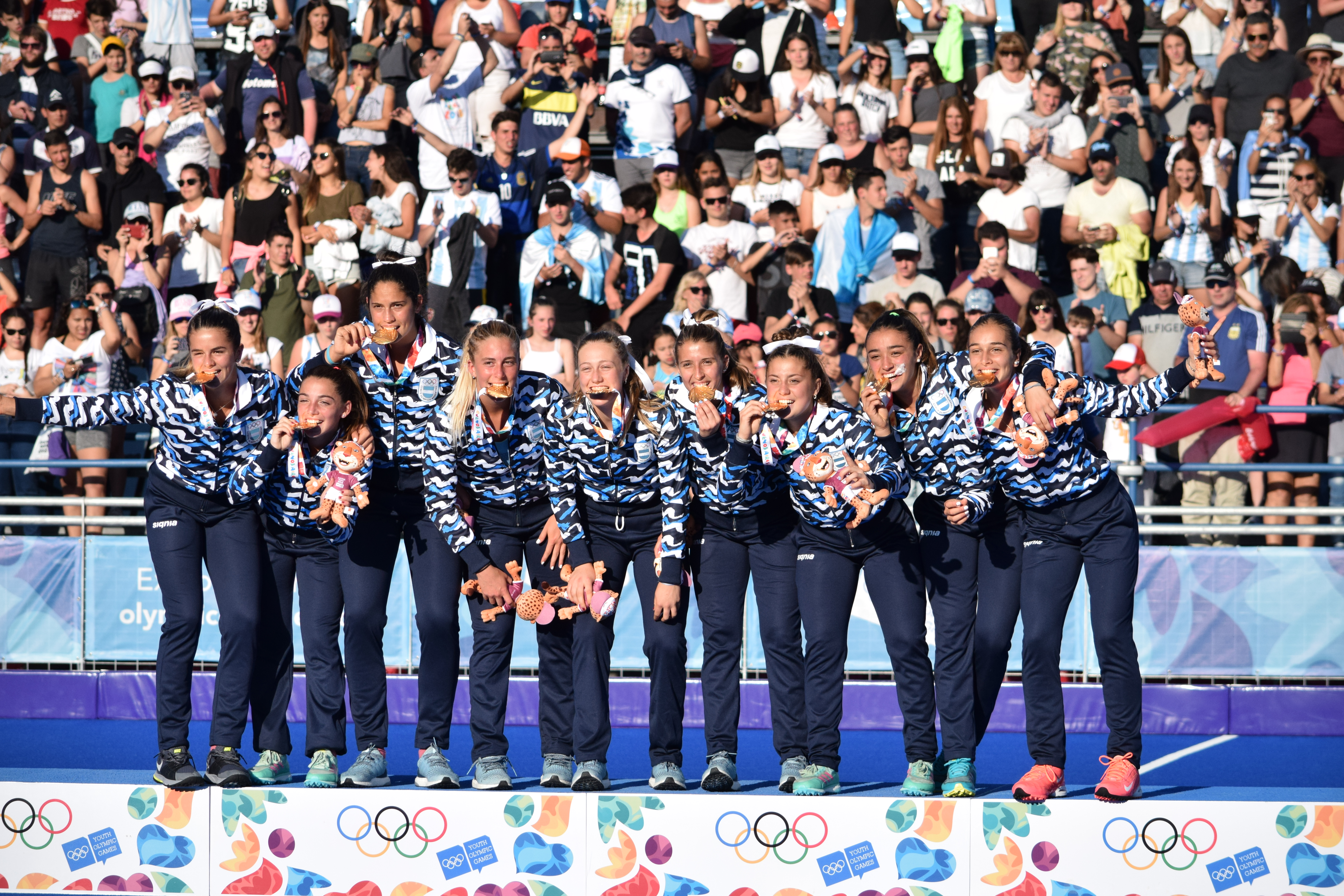
With her team during 2018 ceremony

Lourdes Pérez Iturraspe (born 16 February 2000) is an Argentine field hockey goalkeeper.

== Hockey career ==
In 2018 she participated in 2018 Youth Olympic Games with her country field hockey team. She and her team won a gold medal in the competition.

In 2022 she participated in Under22 (originally U21) category of 2022 Women's FIH Hockey Junior World Cup (delayed one year). Her team was a defending champion and they lost to Germany in quarter-finals. She played 5 matches.

In June 2022, Pérez was called into the senior national women's team.
