= Sofía Ramallo =

Argentine field hockey player

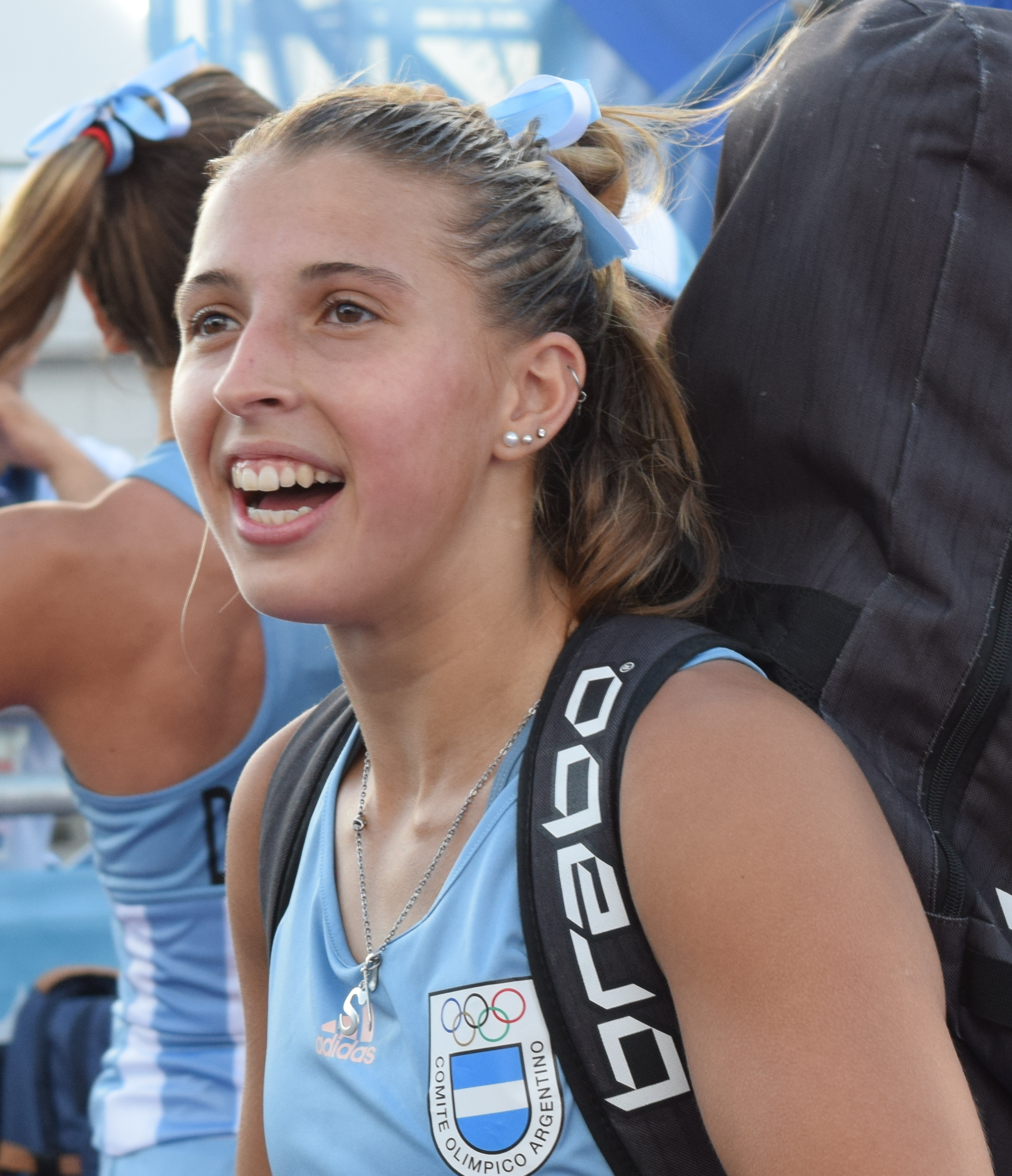
- Ramallo at the 2018 Summer Youth Olympics

Personal information
- Born: 26 March 2001 (age 25) Argentina

Sport
- Sport: Field hockey
- Position: Midfielder
- Club: Club Universitario de Córdoba
National team
Years	Team	Caps	Goals
2017–Present	Argentina U18	15	-
2019–Present	Argentina	1	-
Medal record
Youth Olympics
Gold medal – first place	2018 Buenos Aires

Sofía Ramallo (born 26 March 2001) is an Argentine field hockey player.

== Hockey career ==
In 2019, Ramallo was called into the senior national women's team.

She won a gold medal at the 2018 Youth Olympics in Buenos Aires.
