= Latvia at the 2018 Summer Youth Olympics =

- IOC code: LAT
- NOC: Latvian Olympic Committee
- Website: http://www.olimpiade.lv/

in Buenos Aires, Argentina 6 – 18 October 2018
- Competitors: 19
- Medals: Gold 0 Silver 0 Bronze 0 Total 0

Summer Youth Olympics appearances
- 2010; 2014; 2018

Latvia participated at the 2018 Summer Youth Olympics in Buenos Aires, Argentina from 6 October to 18 October 2018.

== Athletics ==
Girls
Track & road events

Athlete	Event	Round 1		Round 2		Total	
Athlete	Event	Result	Rank	Result	Rank	Result	Rank
Nora Ķigure	100 metres	13.14	26	12.46	25	25.60	25
Patricija Cīrule	800 metres	2:10.80	9	2:10.08	6	4:20.88	8
Elīza Kraule	100 metre hurdles	14.45	15	14.14	14	28.59	16

== Basketball ==
Latvia qualified a boys' team based on the U18 3x3 National Federation Ranking.

- Boys' tournament - 1 team of 4 athletes

Event	Group stage					Quarterfinal	Semifinal	Final / BM
Event	Opposition Score	Opposition Score	Opposition Score	Opposition Score	Rank	Opposition Score	Opposition Score	Opposition Score
Boys' tournament	Belgium; L 16–18	Kazakhstan; W 19–16	Kyrgyzstan; W 15–12	Italy; L 10–19	3	did not advance		

Dunk contest

Athlete	Event	Qualification				Semifinal				Final				
Athlete	Event	Round 1	Round 2	Total	Rank	Round 1	Round 2	Total	Rank	Round 1	Round 2	Round 3	Total	Rank
Niks Salenieks	Dunk contest	22	24	46	5	did not advance								

== Cycling ==
Latvia qualified a mixed BMX racing team based on its ranking in the Youth Olympic Games BMX Junior Nation Rankings. They also qualified one athlete in BMX freestyle based on its performance at the 2018 Urban Cycling World Championship.

- Mixed BMX racing team - 1 team of 2 athletes
- Mixed BMX freestyle - 1 boy

== Dancesport ==
Latvia qualified one dancer based on its performance at the 2018 World Youth Breaking Championship.

- B-Girls - Anastasia

== Gymnastics ==
=== Artistic ===
Latvia qualified one gymnast based on its performance at the 2018 European Junior Championship.

- Boys' artistic individual all-around - 1 quota

Athlete	Event	Apparatus						Total	Rank
Athlete	Event	F	PH	R	V	PB	HB	Total	Rank
Oļegs Ivanovs	Qualification	11.566	11.433	13.100	14.100	12.900	12.733	75.832	13
Oļegs Ivanovs	All-around	13.066	11.500	12.600	13.900	12.900	12.733	76.699	11
Oļegs Ivanovs	Horizontal bar	—N/a					12.566	12.566	7
Oļegs Ivanovs	Rings	—N/a		11.525	—N/a			11.525	7

=== Multidiscipline ===
Team	Athlete	Acrobatic	Artistic	Rhythmic	Trampoline	Total points	Rank
Team Marina Chernova (Light Green)	Arina Yulusheva (UZB); Nikolay Evdokimov (UZB)	30	—N/a			492	12
Team Marina Chernova (Light Green)	Nguyễn Văn Khánh Phong (VIE)	—N/a	48	—N/a		492	12
Team Marina Chernova (Light Green)	Vlada Raković (SRB)	—N/a	61	—N/a		492	12
Team Marina Chernova (Light Green)	Oļegs Ivanovs (LAT)	—N/a	55	—N/a		492	12
Team Marina Chernova (Light Green)	Lisa Conradie (RSA)	—N/a	59	—N/a		492	12
Team Marina Chernova (Light Green)	Olivia Araujo (ARG)	—N/a	18	—N/a		492	12
Team Marina Chernova (Light Green)	Emma Slevin (IRL)	—N/a	33	—N/a		492	12
Team Marina Chernova (Light Green)	Lee So-yun (KOR)	—N/a		57	—N/a	492	12
Team Marina Chernova (Light Green)	Jennifer Rivera (COL)	—N/a		86	—N/a	492	12
Team Marina Chernova (Light Green)	Antonella Genuzio (BOL)	—N/a		20	—N/a	492	12
Team Marina Chernova (Light Green)	Ivan Litvinovich (BLR)	—N/a			2	492	12
Team Marina Chernova (Light Green)	Thalia Loveira (NAM)	—N/a			23	492	12

== Shooting ==
- Boys' 10m Air Pistol - 1 quota

Individual

Athlete	Event	Qualification		Final	
Athlete	Event	Points	Rank	Points	Rank
Rihards Zorge	Boys' 10 m air pistol	569-17	5	110.2	8

Team

Athlete	Event	Qualification		Round of 16	Quarterfinal	Semifinal	Final	
Athlete	Event	Points	Rank	Opposition Score	Opposition Score	Opposition Score	Opposition Score	Rank
Giulia Campostrini (ITA); Rihards Zorge (LAT)	Mixed 10 metre air pistol	746-12	8	Haristiade (ROU); Solari (SUI); W 10-6	Ibarra Miranda (MEX); Honta (UKR); L 8-10	did not advance		
