= Josefina Rübenacker =

Argentine field hockey player

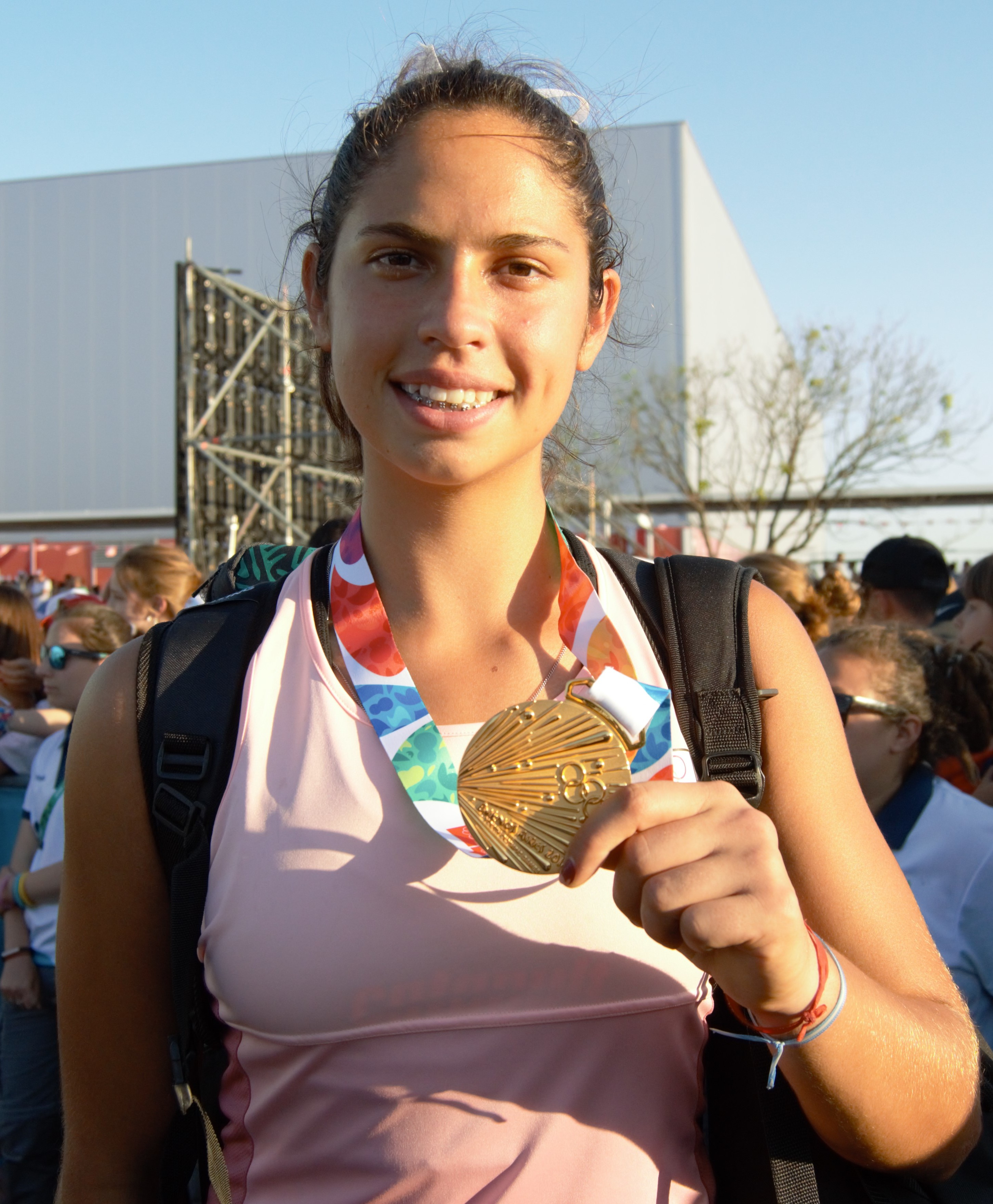
- Josefina Rübenacker

Personal information
- Born: 26 August 2000 (age 25) Córdoba, Argentina

Sport
- Sport: Field hockey
- Position: Forward
- Club: Club La Tablada
National team
| Years | Team | Caps | Goals |
| 2018–Present | Argentina U18 | 8 | - |
| 2019–Present | Argentina | 3 | - |
Medal record
Youth Olympics
| Gold medal – first place | 2018 Buenos Aires |

Josefina Rübenacker (born 26 August 2000) is an Argentinian field hockey player.

== Hockey career ==
In 2019, Rübenacker was called into the senior national women's team.

She won a gold medal at the 2018 Youth Olympics in Buenos Aires.
