= Celina Di Santo =

Argentine field hockey player

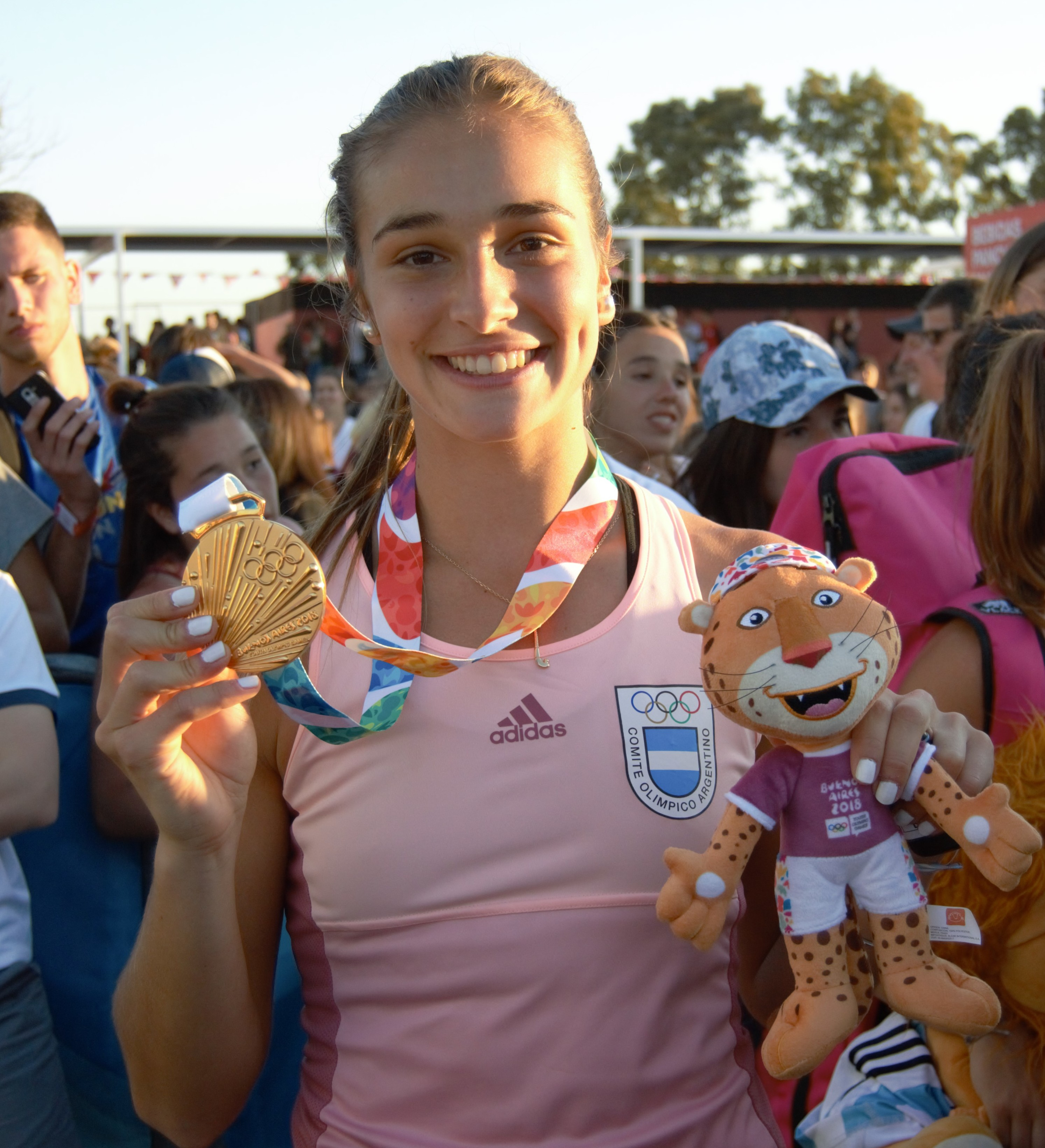

Personal information
- Born: 23 February 2000 (age 26) Argentina
- Height: 165 cm (5 ft 5 in)
- Weight: 59 kg (130 lb)

Sport
- Sport: Field hockey
- Position: Midfielder
- Club: Lomas
National team
Years	Team	Caps	Goals
2019–	Argentina	19	(1)
Medal record
Pan American Cup
Gold medal – first place	2022 Santiago
Youth Olympics
Gold medal – first place	2018 Buenos Aires

Celina Di Santo (born 23 February 2000) is an Argentine field hockey player who plays for Lomas Athletic Club.

== Hockey career ==
In 2019, Di Santo was called into the senior national women's team. She competed in the team that finished fourth at the 2019 Pro League in Amstelveen.

She won a gold medal at the 2018 Youth Olympics in Buenos Aires.
