= Slovakia at the Youth Olympics =

- IOC code: SVK
- NOC: Slovak Olympic and Sports Committee
- Website: www.olympic.sk
- Medals Ranked 58th: Gold 3 Silver 10 Bronze 11 Total 24

Summer appearances
- 2010; 2014; 2018; 2026

Winter appearances
- 2012; 2016; 2020; 2024

Slovakia has participated at the Youth Olympic Games in every edition since the inaugural 2010 Games and has earned medals from every edition.

== Medal tables ==
=== Medals by Summer Games ===
Games	Athletes	Gold	Silver	Bronze	Total	Rank
2010 Singapore	17	0	2	3	5	63
(China) 2014 Nanjing	38	0	2	1	3	58
(Argentina) 2018 Buenos Aires	33	1	1	1	3	52
(Senegal) 2026 Dakar	13	1	2	3	6	43
Total		2	7	8	17	63

=== Medals by Winter Games ===
Games	Athletes	Gold	Silver	Bronze	Total	Rank
(Austria) 2012 Innsbruck	30	1	0	0	1	19
(Norway) 2016 Lillehammer	33	0	1	0	1	24
(Switzerland) 2020 Lausanne	49	0	1	1	2	25
(South Korea) 2024 Gangwon	49	0	1	2	3	25
(Italy) 2028 Dolomiti Valtellina						
Total		1	3	3	7	20

=== Medals by summer sport ===
Sport	Gold	Silver	Bronze	Total
Canoeing	1	3	2	6
Cycling	1	1	0	2
Tennis	0	1	2	3
Athletics	0	1	0	1
Boxing	0	1	0	1
Judo	0	0	2	2
Swimming	0	0	2	2
Totals (7 entries)	2	7	8	17

=== Medals by winter sport ===
Sport	Gold	Silver	Bronze	Total
Alpine skiing	1	0	1	2
Ice hockey	0	1	1	2
Bobsleigh	0	1	0	1
Figure skating	0	1	0	1
Biathlon	0	0	1	1
Totals (5 entries)	1	3	3	7

== List of medalists ==
=== Summer Games ===
Medals awarded to participants of mixed-NOC (combined) teams are represented in italics. These medals are not counted towards the individual NOC medal tally.

Medal	Name	Games	Sport	Event
Gold	Andrea Krišandová	2010 Singapore	Judo	Mixed team
Silver	Jana Čepelová; Chantal Škamlová	2010 Singapore	Tennis	Girls' doubles
Silver	Miroslav Urban	2010 Singapore	Canoeing	Boys' K1 slalom
Bronze	Jana Čepelová	2010 Singapore	Tennis	Girls' singles
Bronze	Filip Horanský; Jozef Kovalík	2010 Singapore	Tennis	Boys' doubles
Bronze	Arpád Szakács	2010 Singapore	Judo	Boys' 81 kg
Silver	Michaela Pešková	(China) 2014 Nanjing	Athletics	Girls' 400 m hurdles
Silver	Jakub Grigar	(China) 2014 Nanjing	Canoeing	Boys' K1 slalom
Bronze	Marko Mirgorodský	(China) 2014 Nanjing	Canoeing	Boys' C1 slalom
Gold	Emanuela Luknárová	(Argentina) 2018 Buenos Aires	Canoeing	Girls' K1 slalom
Silver	Katarína Pecsuková	(Argentina) 2018 Buenos Aires	Canoeing	Girls' K1 sprint
Bronze	Emanuela Luknárová	(Argentina) 2018 Buenos Aires	Canoeing	Girls' C1 slalom
Gold	Timotej Michalík	(Senegal) 2026 Dakar	Cycling	Men's individual time trial
Silver	Karolína Hajduková	(Senegal) 2026 Dakar	Cycling	Women's individual time trial
Silver	Karolína Kollárová	(Senegal) 2026 Dakar	Boxing	Women's 60 kg
Bronze	Matiáš Krištof	(Senegal) 2026 Dakar	Swimming	Men's 100 metre butterfly
Bronze	Vivien Vadovičová	(Senegal) 2026 Dakar	Judo	Women's 52 kg
Bronze	Stela Megelová	(Senegal) 2026 Dakar	Swimming	Women's 200 m individual medley

=== Winter Games ===
Medals awarded to participants of mixed-NOC (combined) teams are represented in italics. These medals are not counted towards the individual NOC medal tally.

Medal	Name	Games	Sport	Event
Gold	Petra Vlhová	(Austria) 2012 Innsbruck	Alpine skiing	Girls' slalom
Silver	Sebastian Čederle	(Norway) 2016 Lillehammer	Ice hockey	Boys' individual skills challenge
Silver	Viktória Čerňanská	(Switzerland) 2020 Lausanne	Bobsleigh	Girls' monobob
Silver	Peter Repčík	(Switzerland) 2020 Lausanne	Ice hockey	Boys' 3x3 mixed
Silver	Nikola Janeková	(Switzerland) 2020 Lausanne	Ice hockey	Girls' 3x3 mixed
Bronze	Rastislav Eliáš	(Switzerland) 2020 Lausanne	Ice hockey	Boys' 3x3 mixed
Bronze	Zuzana Dobiašová	(Switzerland) 2020 Lausanne	Ice hockey	Girls' 3x3 mixed
Bronze	Girls' ice hockey team: Laura Medviďová Simona Macková Nikola Janeková Zuzana Dobiášová Emma Donovalová Barbora Kapičáková Tereza Belková Emma Bianka Živčáková Lea Giertlová Mária Nemčeková Laura Jáncsóová Hana Fančovičová Lea Glosíková Nina Hudáková Kristína Slováková Lily Stern Viktória Kučerová	(Switzerland) 2020 Lausanne	Ice hockey	Girls' tournament
Silver	Adam Hagara	(South Korea) 2024 Gangwon	Figure skating	Men's singles
Bronze	Markus Sklenárik	(South Korea) 2024 Gangwon	Biathlon	Men's individual
Bronze	Andrej Barnáš	(South Korea) 2024 Gangwon	Alpine skiing	Men's Super-G

== Flag bearers ==
#	Games	Season	Flag bearer	Sport
8	2026 Dakar	Summer	Matiáš Krištof	Swimming
8	2026 Dakar	Summer	Vivien Vadovičová	Judo
7	2024 Gangwon	Winter	Tamara Mesíková	Ski Jumping
7	2024 Gangwon	Winter	Michal Adamov	Cross-country skiing
6	2020 Lausanne	Winter	Matúš Černek	Ski mountaineering
5	2018 Buenos Aires	Summer	Jessica Triebeľová	Boxing
4	2016 Lillehammer	Winter	Sebastian Čederle	Ice hockey
3	2014 Nanjing	Summer	Jakub Grigar	Canoeing
2	2012 Innsbruck	Winter	Andrej Segeč	Cross-country skiing
1	2010 Singapore	Summer	Arpád Szakács	Judo

== See also ==
- Slovakia at the Olympics
- Slovakia at the Paralympics
- Slovakia at the European Games
- Slovakia at the European Youth Olympic Festival
- Slovakia at the Universiade
- Slovakia at the World Games
