= Canoeing at the 2018 Summer Youth Olympics =

Canoeing at the III Summer Youth Olympic Games
- Venue: Puerto Madero
- Dates: 12–16 October
- No. of events: 8 (4 boys, 4 girls)
- Competitors: 63 from 32 nations

Canoeing at the 2018 Summer Youth Olympics was held from 12 to 16 October. The events took place at the Puerto Madero in Buenos Aires, Argentina.

== Qualification ==
Each National Olympic Committee (NOC) can enter a maximum of 4 competitors, 2 per each gender and 1 per each boat type. 58 places were decided at the 2018 Youth Olympic Games World Qualification Event. The places were distributed by continental rankings; in total 14 C1 (1 from Africa, 1 from Oceania, 3 from America, 3 from Asia and 6 from Europe) and 15 K1 (1 from Oceania, 2 from Africa, 3 from America, 3 from Asia and 6 from Europe) boat quotas were allocated to each gender. As hosts, Argentina was given two boats, one for each gender to compete and a further four boats, two for each gender were decided by the tripartite committee.

All athletes must compete in both disciplines (slalom and sprint) or risk disqualification. To be eligible to participate at the Youth Olympics athletes must have been born between 1 January 2002 and 31 December 2003.

An athlete once selected for the YOG can participate in both categories (i.e. Canoe and Kayak), regardless if the NOC is already represented in that category.

=== C-1 ===
Event	Location	Date	Continent	Total Places	Qualified Boys	Qualified Girls
Host	-	-	-	1	Argentina	—N/a
2018 World Qualification Event	(Spain) Barcelona	12–15 April 2018	Africa	1	Mauritius	Nigeria
2018 World Qualification Event	(Spain) Barcelona	12–15 April 2018	Americas	3	Brazil; Chile; Mexico	Chile; Mexico; United States
2018 World Qualification Event	(Spain) Barcelona	12–15 April 2018	Asia	3	Iran; Kazakhstan; Uzbekistan	Iran; Kazakhstan; Uzbekistan
2018 World Qualification Event	(Spain) Barcelona	12–15 April 2018	Europe	6	Czech Republic; Germany; Hungary; Portugal; Spain; Ukraine	France; Germany; Hungary; Slovakia; Spain; Ukraine
2018 World Qualification Event	(Spain) Barcelona	12–15 April 2018	Oceania	1	New Zealand	New Zealand
Tripartite Invitation	-	-	-	1	São Tomé and Príncipe	Belarus; Mozambique
TOTAL					16	16

=== K-1 ===
Event	Location	Date	Continent	Total Places	Qualified Boys	Qualified Girls
Host	-	-	-	1	—N/a	Argentina
2018 World Qualification Event	(Spain) Barcelona	12–15 April 2018	Africa	2	South Africa; Tunisia	Nigeria; South Africa
2018 World Qualification Event	(Spain) Barcelona	12–15 April 2018	Americas	3	Argentina; Mexico; United States	Chile; Mexico; United States
2018 World Qualification Event	(Spain) Barcelona	12–15 April 2018	Asia	3	China; Kazakhstan; Uzbekistan	Kazakhstan; Chinese Taipei; Thailand
2018 World Qualification Event	(Spain) Barcelona	12–15 April 2018	Europe	6	Czech Republic; France; Hungary; Poland; Slovenia; ~~Spain~~	Czech Republic; France; Germany; Hungary; Italy; Slovakia
2018 World Qualification Event	(Spain) Barcelona	12–15 April 2018	Oceania	1	New Zealand	Australia
Reallocation	-	-	-	1	Belgium	-
TOTAL					~~16~~ 15	16

== Medal summary ==
=== Medal table ===
* Host nation (Argentina)

Rank	Nation	Gold	Silver	Bronze	Total
1	Hungary	2	1	0	3
2	France	1	1	1	3
2	Slovakia	1	1	1	3
4	Uzbekistan	1	1	0	2
5	Kazakhstan	1	0	1	2
6	Mauritius	1	0	0	1
6	Slovenia	1	0	0	1
8	Belgium	0	1	0	1
8	China	0	1	0	1
8	Germany	0	1	0	1
8	New Zealand	0	1	0	1
12	Argentina*	0	0	1	1
12	Chinese Taipei	0	0	1	1
12	Czech Republic	0	0	1	1
12	Mexico	0	0	1	1
12	Spain	0	0	1	1
Totals (16 entries)		8	8	8	24

=== Boys' events ===
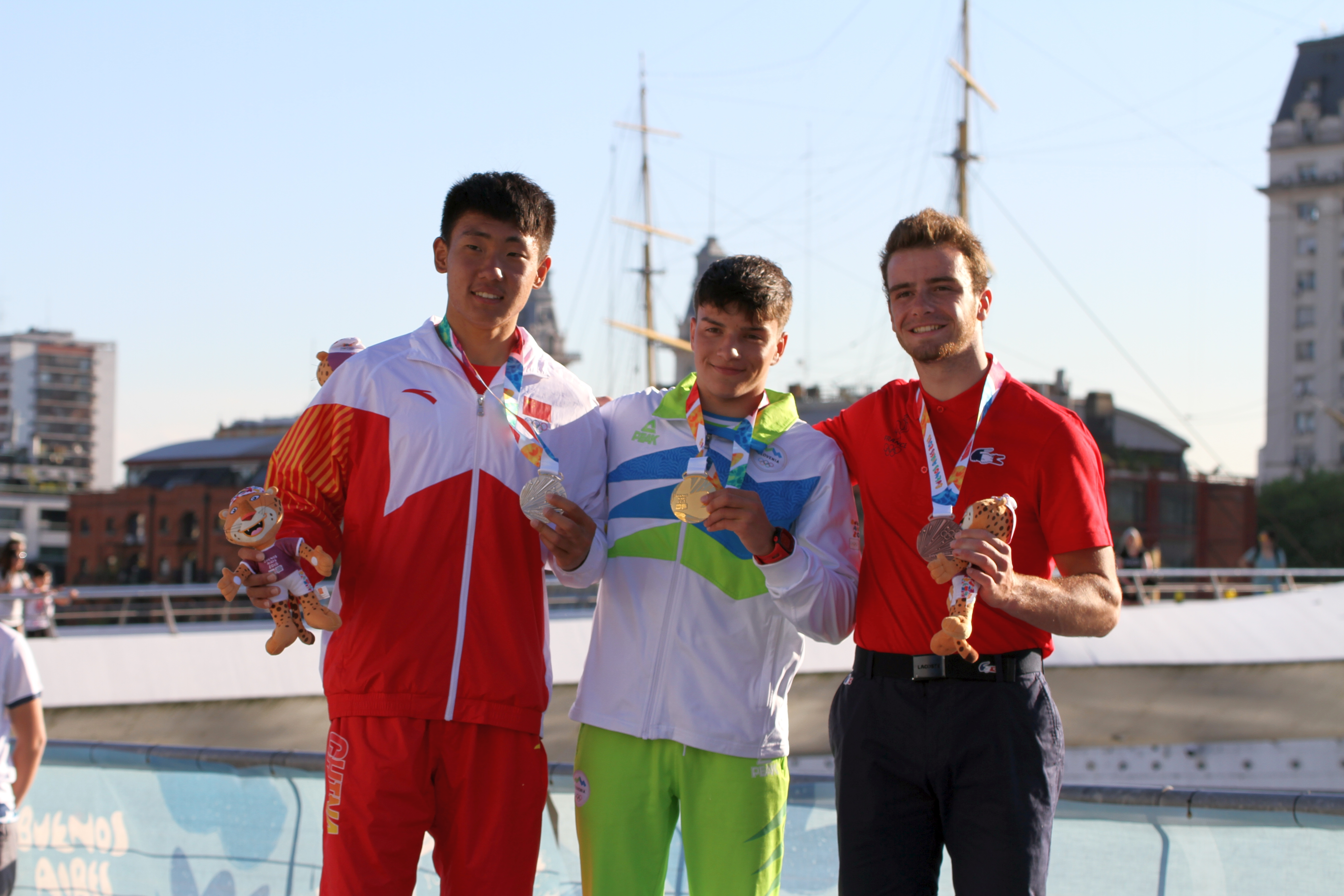
Obstacle Canoe Slalom K1 victory ceremony: Guan Changheng - Lan Tominc - Tom Bouchardon

Games	Gold	Silver	Bronze
Head-to-head Sprint C1	Dias Bakhraddin; Kazakhstan	Islomjon Abdusalomov; Uzbekistan	Jiří Minařík; Czech Republic
Head-to-head Sprint K1	Ádám Kiss; Hungary	Jules Vangeel; Belgium	Valentín Rossi; Argentina
Obstacle Canoe Slalom C1	Terence Benjamin Saramandif; Mauritius	Finn Anderson; New Zealand	Yoel Becerra; Spain
Obstacle Canoe Slalom K1	Lan Tominc; Slovenia	Guan Changheng; China	Tom Bouchardon; France

=== Girls' events ===
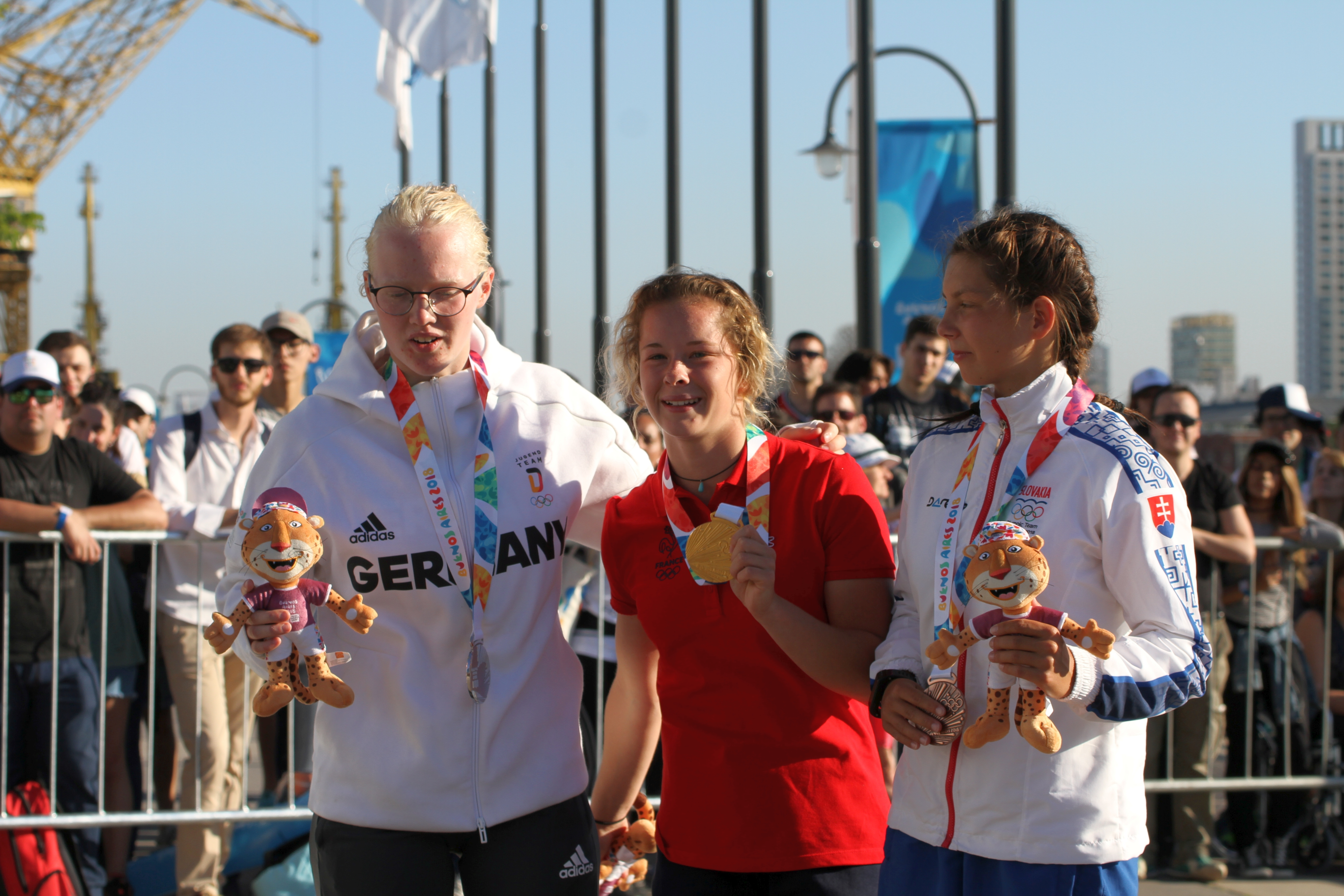
Obstacle Canoe Slalom C1 victory ceremony: Zola Lewandowski - Doriane Delassus - Emanuela Luknárová

Games	Gold	Silver	Bronze
Head-to-head Sprint C1	Gulbakhor Fayzieva; Uzbekistan	Laura Gönczöl; Hungary	Stephanie Rodríguez; Mexico
Head-to-head Sprint K1	Eszter Rendessy; Hungary	Katarína Pecsuková; Slovakia	Stella Sukhanova; Kazakhstan
Obstacle Canoe Slalom C1	Doriane Delassus; France	Zola Lewandowski; Germany	Emanuela Luknárová; Slovakia
Obstacle Canoe Slalom K1	Emanuela Luknárová; Slovakia	Doriane Delassus; France	Lai Tzu-hsuan; Chinese Taipei
