= Slovakia at the 2018 Summer Youth Olympics =

- IOC code: SVK
- NOC: Slovak Olympic Committee
- Website: http://www.olympic.sk/

in Buenos Aires, Argentina 6 – 18 October 2018
- Competitors: 33 in 12 sports
- Flag bearer: Jessica Triebeľová
- Medals Ranked 52nd: Gold 1 Silver 1 Bronze 1 Total 3

Summer Youth Olympics appearances (overview)
- 2010; 2014; 2018; 2026

Slovakia participated at the 2018 Summer Youth Olympics in Buenos Aires, Argentina from 6 October to 18 October 2018.

== Medalists ==
Medal	Name	Sport	Event	Date
Gold	Emanuela Luknárová	Canoeing	Girls' Obstacle Canoe Slalom K1	15 Oct
Silver	Katarína Pecsuková	Canoeing	Girls' Head-to-head Sprint K1	12 Oct
Bronze	Emanuela Luknárová	Canoeing	Girls' Obstacle Canoe Slalom C1	16 Oct

== Athletics ==
Slovakia qualified six athletes.

Boys
Track & road events

Athlete	Event	Stage 1		Stage 2		Total	
Athlete	Event	Result	Rank	Result	Rank	Result	Rank
Oliver Murcko	200 m	21.91	14	21.19	5	43.10	7
Andrej Paulíny	1500 m	3:56.08	8	12:36	34	16:32.08	9
Ľubomír Kubiš	5000 m Race Walk	21:10.94	8	21:42.72	5	42:53.66	6

Girls
Track & road events

Athlete	Event	Stage 1		Stage 2		Total	
Athlete	Event	Result	Rank	Result	Rank	Result	Rank
Lenka Kovačovičová	100 m	12.70	23	12.18	22	24.88	22
Viktória Forster	200 m	25.28	13	24.56	14	49.84	14

Field events

Athlete	Event	Stage 1		Stage 2		Total	
Athlete	Event	Result	Rank	Result	Rank	Result	Rank
Michaela Vrecková	Shot put	13.22	14	12.89	15	26.11	15

== Boxing ==
Slovakia qualified one athlete.

Girls

Athlete	Event	Preliminaries	Semifinals	Final / RM	Rank
Athlete	Event	Opposition Result	Opposition Result	Opposition Result	Rank
Jessica Triebeľová	-57 kg	Somnuek (THA); L RSC R3 1:12	did not advance		5

== Canoeing ==
Slovakia qualified two boats based on its performance at the 2018 World Qualification Event.

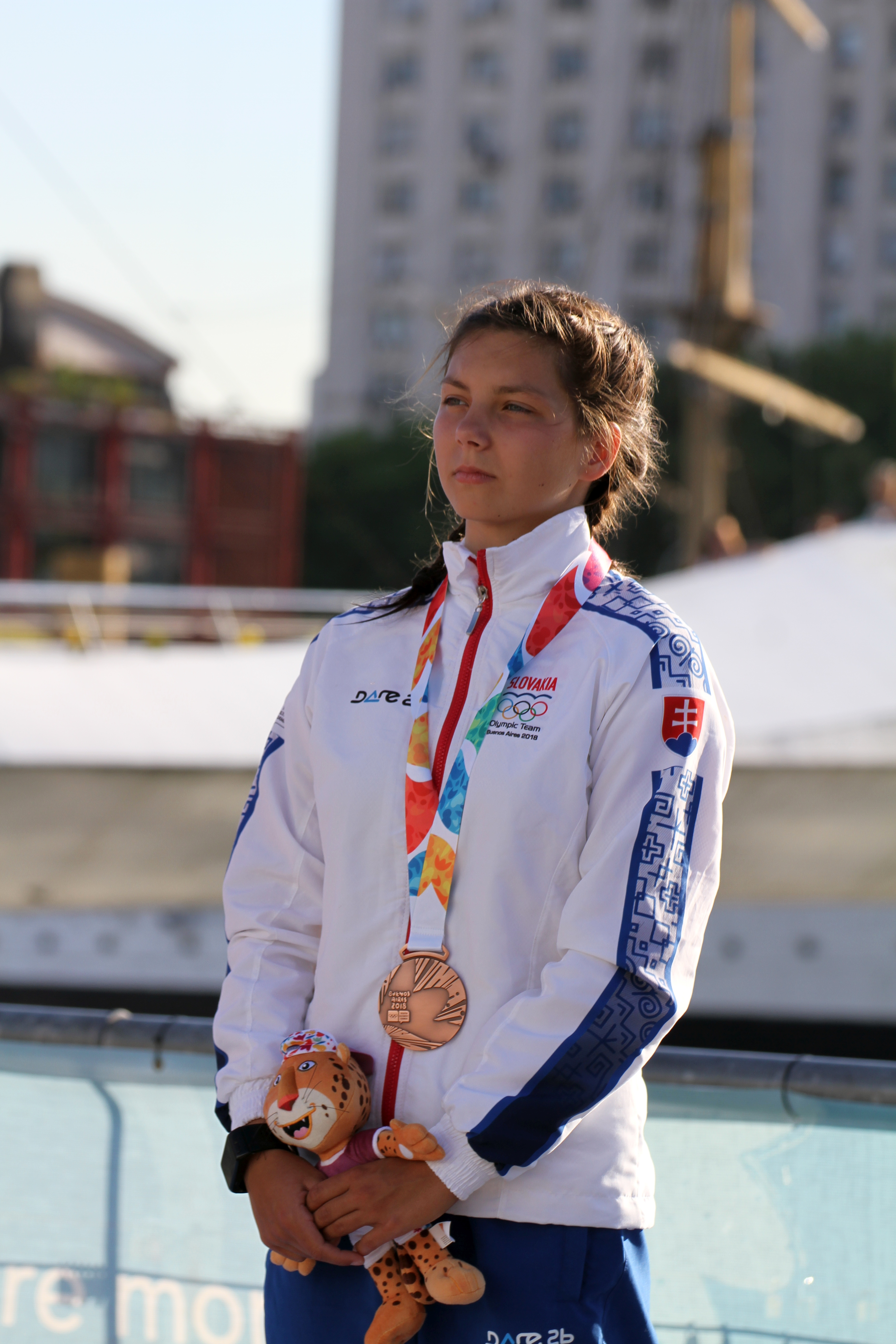
Emanuela Luknárová at the C1 slalom Victory ceremon

Girls

Athlete	Event	Qualification		Repechage		Round of 16	Quarterfinals	Semifinals	Final / BM	Rank
Athlete	Event	Time	Rank	Time	Rank	Opposition Result	Opposition Result	Opposition Result	Opposition Result	Rank
Emanuela Luknárová	C1 sprint	3:55.57	16	6:46.85	9	did not advance				
Emanuela Luknárová	C1 slalom	1:27.51	1 Q	—N/a		Fayzieva (UZB); W 1:27.350	Nurlanova (KAZ); W 1:26.300	Lewandowski (GER); L 1:26.430	Asadbeki (IRN); W 1:25.750	3rd place, bronze medalist(s)
Emanuela Luknárová	K1 sprint	2:24.97	19	2:20.96	10	did not advance				
Emanuela Luknárová	K1 slalom	1:18.97	1 Q	—N/a		Zironi (ITA); W 1:18.330	Pecsuková (SVK); W 1:17.400	Lai (TPE); W 1:18.440	Delassus (FRA); W 1:18.250	1st place, gold medalist(s)
Katarína Pecsuková	K1 sprint	1:53.14	2 Q	—N/a		Phuangmaiming (THA); W 1:54.060	Estefano (ARG); W 1:52.050	Zint (GER); W 1:51.260	Rendessy (HUN); L 1:51.940	2nd place, silver medalist(s)
Katarína Pecsuková	K1 slalom	1:23.36	6 Q	—N/a		Bello (NGR); W 1:22.560	Luknárová (SVK); L 1:22.840	did not advance		

== Cycling ==
Slovakia qualified a boys' combined team based on its ranking in the Youth Olympic Games Junior Nation Rankings. They also qualified a mixed BMX racing team based on its ranking in the Youth Olympic Games BMX Junior Nation Rankings.

- Boys' combined team – 1 team of 2 athletes
- Mixed BMX racing team – 1 team of 2 athletes

Team

Athletes	Event	Cross-Country Eliminator		Time Trial			Criterium		Cross-Country Race			Road Race			Total Pts	Rank
Athletes	Event	Stage	Points	Time	Rank	Points	Rank	Points	Time	Rank	Points	Time	Rank	Points	Total Pts	Rank
Tomáš Meriač; Lukáš Kubiš	Boys' combined team	Qualification; 1/8 Finals	0	9:07.32	15	2	DNF; 29	0	18:48 (H); 20:03 (F)	18 (H); 14 (F)	3	1:33:46; 1:31:03	37; 23	0	5	19

BMX

Athletes	Event	BMX		Rank
Athletes	Event	Rank	Points	Rank
Patrik Nagy; Radka Paulechová	Mixed BMX racing	15	8	15

== Judo ==
Slovakia qualified one athlete based on its position at the IJF cadet WRL.

Individual

Athlete	Event	Round of 16	Quarterfinals	Semifinals	Repechage		Final / BM	Rank
Athlete	Event	Round of 16	Quarterfinals	Semifinals	Quarterfinals	Semifinals	Final / BM	Rank
Athlete	Event	Opposition Result	Opposition Result	Opposition Result	Opposition Result	Opposition Result	Opposition Result	Rank
Alex Barto	Boys' −81 kg	Dijk (NED); W 001–000	Ayarza (PAN); W 002–000	Sulca (ROU); L 000–100			Young (CAN); L 001–001	4

Team

Team	Event	Round 1	Round 2	Semifinals	Final	Rank
Team	Event	Opposition Result	Opposition Result	Opposition Result	Opposition Result	Rank
Seoul; Mohammed Al-Mishri (LBA); Alex Barto (SVK); Sairy Colón (PUR); María Giménez (VEN); Yuri Israelyan (ARM); Kim Ju-hee (KOR); Omaria Ramírez (DOM); Wu Xiao-zhang (TPE)	Mixed Team	Los Angeles; L 3–5	did not advance			9

== Futsal ==
Slovakia qualified the boys' team (10 athletes).

Team

- Sebastián Bačo
- Tibor Boháč
- Jakub Filip
- Kristián Medoň
- Rastislav Moravec
- Jozef Koricina
- Matúš Šlehofer
- Matúš Ševčík
- Marek Kuruc
- Kevin Kollár

=== Boys' tournament ===
==== Group A ====
Pos	Team	Pld	W	D	L	GF	GA	GD	Pts	Qualification
1	Egypt	4	3	1	0	15	8	+7	10	Semi-finals
2	Argentina (H)	4	2	1	1	19	8	+11	7	Semi-finals
3	Iraq	4	2	1	1	12	5	+7	7	
4	Slovakia	4	1	0	3	5	12	−7	3	
5	Panama	4	0	1	3	7	25	−18	1	

Source: FIFA IOC
(H) Hosts
8 October 2018
20:00

Iraq	5–0	Slovakia
Abdulrahman 23', 30'; Kadhim 25', 28'; Sabri 35'	Report (FIFA); Report (IOC) Category:Futsal at the 2018 Summer Youth Olympics – Boys First Round – IRQ-SVK on Wikimedia Commons

Tecnópolis
Attendance: 650
Referee: Nikola Jelić (Croatia)

10 October 2018
18:00

Slovakia	0–4	Argentina
	Report (FIFA); Report (IOC)	De Candia 2'; Ramírez 10'; Urriza 19'; Rufino 23'

Tecnópolis
Attendance: 6,150
Referee: Lee Po-fu (Chinese Taipei)

11 October 2018
20:00

Slovakia	4–1	Panama
Koricina 4', 33'; Bačo 12', 16'	Report (FIFA); Report (IOC)	Ogilvie 22'

Tecnópolis
Attendance: 985
Referee: Valeria Palma (Chile)

13 October 2018
20:00

Egypt	2–1	Slovakia
El-Sayed 14'; Morsy 24'	Report (FIFA); Report (IOC)	Šlehofer 38'

CeNARD
Attendance: 777
Referee: Gelareh Nazemi (Iran)

== Karate ==
Slovakia qualified one athlete based on the rankings in the Buenos Aires 2018 Olympic Standings.

Athlete	Event	Group phase				Semifinal	Final / BM	
Athlete	Event	Opposition Score	Opposition Score	Opposition Score	Rank	Opposition Score	Opposition Score	Rank
Tomáš Kósa	Boys' +68 kg	Sakiyama (JPN); L 0–1	Crean (IRL); L 2–3	Mohammadi (IRI); L 0–1	4	did not advance		

== Shooting ==
Slovakia qualified one sport shooter.

Athlete	Event	Qualification		Final	
Athlete	Event	Points	Rank	Points	Rank
Jerguš Vengríni	Boys' 10m Air Pistol	554	15	did not advance	

Team

Athletes	Event	Qualification		Round of 16	Quarterfinals	Semifinals	Final / BM	
Athletes	Event	Points	Rank	Opposition Result	Opposition Result	Opposition Result	Opposition Result	Rank
Lu Kaiman (CHN); Jerguš Vengríni (SVK)	Mixed 10m air pistol	739	13 Q	Rankelytė (LTU); Ușanlî (MDA); L 7–10	did not advance			

== Sport climbing ==
Slovakia qualified one sport climber based on its performance at the 2017 World Youth Sport Climbing Championships.

Athlete	Event	Speed Qualification		Bouldering Qualification		Lead Qualification			Points	Final			
Athlete	Event	Time	Points	Result	Points	Hold Reached	Time	Points	Points	Speed	Bouldering	Lead	Rank
Peter Kuric	Boys' combined	8.50	16	0T 1z	18	32+	2:54	13	3744	did not advance			

== Swimming ==
Slovakia qualified four athlete based on its performance at the 17th FINA World Championships in Budapest.

Boys

Athlete	Events	Heat		Semifinal		Final	
Athlete	Events	Time	Position	Time	Position	Time	Position
Matej Duša	50 m freestyle	23.30	18	did not advance			
Matej Duša	50 m butterfly	26.35	45	did not advance			
Dávid Gajdoš	50 m breaststroke	29.64	28	did not advance			
Dávid Gajdoš	100 m breaststroke	1:04.87	24	did not advance			

Girls

Athlete	Events	Heat		Semifinal		Final	
Athlete	Events	Time	Position	Time	Position	Time	Position
Tamara Potocká	50 m freestyle	27.10	25	did not advance			
Tamara Potocká	100 m freestyle	58.69	33	did not advance			
Tamara Potocká	50 m butterfly	27.69	14 Q	26.95	6 Q	27.48	8
Tamara Potocká	100 m butterfly	1:04.80	28	did not advance			
Tamara Potocká	200 m individual medley	2:21.54	22	—N/a		did not advance	
Miroslava Záborská	50 m breaststroke	34.39	32	did not advance			
Miroslava Záborská	100 m breaststroke	1:13.30	39	did not advance			
Miroslava Záborská	200 m breaststroke	2:34.32	19	—N/a		did not advance	

== Table tennis ==
Slovakia qualified one table tennis player based on its performance at the Road to Buenos Aires (Africa) series.

Athlete	Event	Group stage		Round of 16	Quarterfinals	Semifinals	Final / BM	
Athlete	Event	Opposition Score	Rank	Opposition Score	Opposition Score	Opposition Score	Opposition Score	Rank
Tatiana Kukulková	Girls' singles	Šurjan (SRB) L 3–4; Choi (KOR) L 0–4; Wang (USA) W 4–3	4	did not advance				
Intercontinental–3; Tatiana Kukulková (SVK); Rohit Pagarani (BIZ)	Mixed team	Thailand L 1–2; Russia L 1–2; Latin America–1 (MIX) L 0–3	4	did not advance				

== Weightlifting ==
Slovakia qualified one athlete.

Athlete	Event	Snatch		Clean & Jerk		Total	Rank
Athlete	Event	Result	Rank	Result	Rank	Total	Rank
Sebastián Cabala	Boys' 69 kg	107	6	148	5	255	6
