= Canoeing at the 2018 Summer Youth Olympics – Girls' K1 sprint =

Girls' K1 sprint at the III Summer Youth Olympic Games
- Venue: Puerto Madero
- Dates: October 12
- Competitors: 20 from 16 nations

Medalists
1st place, gold medalist(s)		Eszter Rendessy	Hungary
2nd place, silver medalist(s)		Katarína Pecsuková	Slovakia
3rd place, bronze medalist(s)		Stella Sukhanova	Kazakhstan

These are the results for the girls' K1 sprint event at the 2018 Summer Youth Olympics.

== Results ==
=== Qualification ===
Rank	Athlete	Nation	Time	Notes
1	Eszter Rendessy	Hungary	1:48.68	Q
2	Katarína Pecsuková	Slovakia	1:53.14	Q
3	Gina Zint	Germany	1:54.49	Q
4	Stella Sukhanova	Kazakhstan	1:54.64	Q
5	Adela Házová	Czech Republic	1:55.91	Q
6	Romane Charayron	France	1:56.42	Q
7	Lucrezia Zironi	Italy	1:56.53	Q
8	Rebecca D'Estefano	Argentina	1:56.66	Q
9	Andrea Rocha Donias	Mexico	2:01.13	
10	Blessing Toboh Amusar	Nigeria	2:01.24	
10	Lai Tzu-hsuan	Chinese Taipei	2:01.24	
12	Jenaya Massie	Australia	2:02.52	
13	Pornnapphan Phuangmaiming	Thailand	2:02.74	
14	Lizanne Conradie	South Africa	2:05.30	
15	Ayomide Emmanuel Bello	Nigeria	2:11.61	
16	Emily Constanza Valenzuela	Chile	2:13.33	
17	Doriane Delassus	France	2:13.68	
18	Ria Spibar	United States	2:16.09	
19	Emanuela Luknárová	Slovakia	2:24.97	
20	Zola Charlotte Marion Lewandowski	Germany	2:25.65	

=== Repechages ===
Rank	Athlete	Nation	Time	Notes
1	Andrea Rocha Donias	Mexico	2:01.10	Q
2	Pornnapphan Phuangmaiming	Thailand	2:01.35	Q
3	Lai Tzu-hsuan	Chinese Taipei	2:02.89	Q
4	Jenaya Massie	Australia	2:03.43	Q
5	Lizanne Conradie	South Africa	2:05.64	Q
6	Emily Constanza Valenzuela	Chile	2:10.38	Q
7	Doriane Delassus	France	2:11.30	Q
8	Ayomide Emmanuel Bello	Nigeria	2:14.68	Q
9	Emanuela Luknárová	Slovakia	2:20.96	
10	Zola Charlotte Marion Lewandowski	Germany	2:22.49	
11	Blessing Toboh Amusar	Nigeria	DSQ	
12	Ria Spibar	United States	DNF	

=== Last 16 ===
Race	Rank	Athlete	Nation	Time	Notes
1	1	Eszter Rendessy	Hungary	1:50.33	Q
1	2	Andrea Rocha Donias	Mexico	2:02.15	
2	1	Katarína Pecsuková	Slovakia	1:54.06	Q
2	2	Pornnapphan Phuangmaiming	Thailand	2:00.35	
3	1	Gina Zint	Germany	1:55.19	Q
3	2	Lai Tzu-hsuan	Chinese Taipei	2:05.96	
4	1	Stella Sukhanova	Kazakhstan	1:56.13	Q
4	2	Jenaya Massie	Australia	2:04.30	
5	1	Adela Házová	Czech Republic	1:59.56	Q
5	2	Lizanne Conradie	South Africa	2:07.95	
6	1	Romane Charayron	France	1:58.25	Q
6	2	Emily Constanza Valenzuela	Chile	2:12.44	
7	1	Lucrezia Zironi	Italy	2:01.62	Q
7	2	Doriane Delassus	France	2:11.30	
8	1	Rebecca D'Estefano	Argentina	1:58.30	Q
8	2	Ayomide Emmanuel Bello	Nigeria	DSQ	

=== Quarterfinals ===
Race	Rank	Athlete	Nation	Time	Notes
1	1	Eszter Rendessy	Hungary	1:49.91	QFS
1	2	Romane Charayron	France	1:56.86	
2	1	Katarína Pecsuková	Slovakia	1:52.05	QFS
2	2	Rebecca D'Estefano	Argentina	1:55.28	
3	1	Gina Zint	Germany	1:54.23	QFS
3	2	Adela Házová	Czech Republic	1:56.07	
4	1	Stella Sukhanova	Kazakhstan	1:53.82	QFS
4	2	Lucrezia Zironi	Italy	1:54.56	

=== Semifinals ===
Race	Rank	Athlete	Nation	Time	Notes
1	1	Eszter Rendessy	Hungary	1:49.13	QFG
1	2	Stella Sukhanova	Kazakhstan	1:55.09	QFB
2	1	Katarína Pecsuková	Slovakia	1:51.26	QFG
2	2	Gina Zint	Germany	1:56.89	QFB

=== Finals ===
Rank	Athlete	Nation	Time	Notes
Gold Medal Race
1st place, gold medalist(s)	Eszter Rendessy	Hungary	1:46.21	
2nd place, silver medalist(s)	Katarína Pecsuková	Slovakia	1:51.94	
Bronze Medal Race
3rd place, bronze medalist(s)	Stella Sukhanova	Kazakhstan	1:54.25	
4	Gina Zint	Germany	1:57.18	
