= Boxing at the 2018 Summer Youth Olympics – Girls' featherweight =

Boxing competitions

Girls' featherweight boxing at the III Summer Youth Olympic Games
- Venue: Oceania Pavilion
- Date: 14–17 October
- Competitors: 7 from 7 nations

Medalists
1st place, gold medalist(s)		Panpatchara Somnuek	Thailand
2nd place, silver medalist(s)		Jennifer Carrillo	Mexico
3rd place, bronze medalist(s)		Dearbhla Rooney	Ireland

The girls' featherweight boxing competition at the 2018 Summer Youth Olympics in Buenos Aires was held from 14 to 17 October at the Oceania Pavilion.

== Schedule ==
All times are local (UTC−3).

Date	Time	Round
Sunday, 14 October	20:08	Preliminaries
Tuesday, 16 October	15:33	Semifinals
Wednesday, 17 October	15:45	Finals

== Results ==
Preliminaries
Hind Moustakim (MAR)	0
Jennifer Carrillo (MEX)	5
Jessica Triebeľová (SVK)
Panpatchara Somnuek (THA)	RSC
Dearbhla Rooney (IRL)	5
Roma Martinez (USA)	0

Semifinals
Te Shelford-Edmonds (NZL)
Jennifer Carrillo (MEX)	RSC
Panpatchara Somnuek (THA)	4
Dearbhla Rooney (IRL)	1

Final
Jennifer Carrillo (MEX)	0
Panpatchara Somnuek (THA)	5
Third place
Te Shelford-Edmonds (NZL)	0
Dearbhla Rooney (IRL)	5
