= Thailand at the 2018 Summer Youth Olympics =

- IOC code: THA
- NOC: National Olympic Committee of Thailand

in Buenos Aires, Argentina
- Competitors: 57 in 21 sports
- Flag bearer: Atichai Phoemsap
- Officials: 30
- Medals Ranked 13th: Gold 4 Silver 5 Bronze 2 Total 11

Summer Youth Olympics appearances (overview)
- 2010; 2014; 2018; 2026

The Kingdom of Thailand, recognized by the name of Thailand by the International Olympic Committee (IOC), represented by the National Olympic Committee of Thailand (NOCT), competed at the 2018 Summer Youth Olympics in Buenos Aires, Argentina, from October 6 to 18, 2018.

The National Olympic Committee of Thailand fielded a team of 57 athletes, 25 boys and 32 girls, to compete in 21 sports at the Games. It was the nation's largest ever delegation sent to the Youth Olympics. Thailand roster marked its Olympic debut in boxing, BMX cycling, canoeing, handball (beach handball), football (futsal), karate (new to the 2018 Games), and roller speed skating (new to the 2018 Games). Moreover, Thailand delegations led by Varin Tansuphasiri, is scheduled to observe the 2018 games to bid the 2026 Youth Olympics with the city of Bangkok, Chonburi, Chiang Mai or Phuket.

== Medal summary ==
=== Medals by sport ===
Medals by sport
Sport	Gold	Silver	Bronze	Total	Ranked
Boxing	2	2	1	5	3
Taekwondo	1	1	0	2	4
Golf	1	0	0	1	2
Weightlifting	0	2	0	2	13
Badminton	0	0	1	1	4
Total	4	5	2	11	13

=== Medals by day ===
Medals by day
Day	Date	1st place, gold medalist(s)	2nd place, silver medalist(s)	3rd place, bronze medalist(s)	Total
1	October 7	0	1	0	1
2	October 8	0	0	0	0
3	October 9	1	1	0	2
4	October 10	0	0	0	0
5	October 11	0	0	0	0
6	October 12	0	1	1	2
7	October 13	0	0	0	0
8	October 14	0	0	0	0
9	October 15	1	0	0	1
10	October 16	0	0	0	0
11	October 17	2	1	1	4
12	October 18	0	1	0	0
Total		4	5	2	11

=== Medalists ===
The following Thailand competitors won medals at the Games.

Medal	Name	Sport	Event	Date
as Thailand
Gold	Kanthinda Saengsin	Taekwondo	Girls' 55 kg	9 October
Gold	Atthaya Thitikul; Vanchai Luangnitikul	Golf	Mixed team	15 October
Gold	Panpatchara Somnuek	Boxing	Girls' 57 kg	17 October
Gold	Atichai Phoemsap	Boxing	Boys' 60 kg	17 October
Silver	Natthawat Chomchuen	Weightlifting	Boys' 56 kg	7 October
Silver	Nareupong Thepsen	Taekwondo	Boys' 63 kg	9 October
Silver	Thipwara Chontavin	Weightlifting	Girls' −63 kg	12 October
Silver	Sarawut Sukthet	Boxing	Boys' 52 kg	17 October
Silver	Porntip Buapa	Boxing	Girls' 60 kg	18 October
Bronze	Phittayaporn Chaiwan	Badminton	Girls' singles	12 October
Bronze	Weerapon Jongjoho	Boxing	Boys' 75 kg	17 October
as Mixed-NOCs
Silver	Kunlavut Vitidsarn	Badminton	Mixed team relay	12 October
Silver	Aitthiwat Soithong	Archery	Mixed team	14 October

- Supatchanin Khamhaeng was disqualified after testing positive for a banned substance. She was stripped of her gold medal.

== Competitors ==
Sport	Boy(s)	Girl(s)	Total
Athletics	1	—N/a	1
Archery	1	—N/a	1
Badminton	1	1	2
Beach handball	9	—N/a	9
Beach volleyball	2	2	4
Boxing	3	2	5
Canoeing	—N/a	1	1
Cycling	1	1	2
Futsal	—N/a	10	10
Golf	1	1	2
Karate	—N/a	1	1
Roller speed skating	—N/a	1	1
Rowing	—N/a	2	2
Sailing	—N/a	1	1
Shooting	—N/a	1	1
Sport climbing	—N/a	1	1
Swimming	2	1	3
Table tennis	1	1	2
Taekwondo	1	2	3
Tennis	—N/a	1	1
Weightlifting	2	2	4
Total	25	32	57

== Delegations ==
Team Thailand

- Thana Chaiprasit – Chef de Mission
- 26 Officials and staffs
- 3 Referees
- Varitta Srijunvong – Thai Youth Olympic Ambassador

National Olympic Committee of Thailand

- Khunying Patama Leeswadtrakul – IOC Member
- Varin Tansuphasiri – Chief of Thailand Youth Olympics Bid Committee

The Wild Boar Football Club

The IOC invited the Wild Boar Football Club who trapped in Tham Luang Nang Non cave to participate in the 2018 Youth Olympics.

== Archery ==
Aitthiwat Soithong qualified based on his performance (third place) at the Asian Continental Qualification Tournament in Dhaka, Bangladesh.

Individual

Athlete	Event	Ranking round		Round of 32	Round of 16	Quarterfinals	Semifinals	Final / BM	Rank
Athlete	Event	Score	Seed	Opposition Score	Opposition Score	Opposition Score	Opposition Score	Opposition Score	Rank
Aitthiwat Soithong	Boys' Individual	669	12	Solera (ESP); L 4–6	did not qualify				17

Team

Athletes	Event	Ranking round		Round of 32	Round of 16	Quarterfinals	Semifinals	Final / BM	Rank
Athletes	Event	Score	Seed	Opposition Score	Opposition Score	Opposition Score	Opposition Score	Opposition Score	Rank
Aitthiwat Soithong (THA); Agustina Sofia Giannasio (ARG)	Mixed Team	1299	16	Paeglis (AUS); Tolba (EGY); W 6–2	Amr Said Mohamed Azzam (EGY); Potrafke (GER); W 5–4	Satır (TUR); Akash (IND); W 6–0	Jones (NZL); Tang (TPE); W 6–0	Touraine-Helias (FRA); Solera (ESP); L 1–5	2nd place, silver medalist(s)

== Badminton ==
Thailand qualified two players based on the Badminton Junior World Rankings.

Singles

Athlete	Event	Group stage				Quarterfinal	Semifinal	Final / BM	Rank
Athlete	Event	Opposition Score	Opposition Score	Opposition Score	Rank	Opposition Score	Opposition Score	Opposition Score	Rank
Kunlavut Vitidsarn	Boys' Singles	Vath (CAM); W (21–9, 21–8)	Maharjan (NEP) no match	Koh (SGP); W (21–14, 21–18)	1Q	Merklé (FRA); L (13–21, 10–21)	did not qualify		5
Pattarasuda Chaiwan	Girls' Singles	Ilori (NGR); W (21–1, 21–4)	Ambalangodage (SRI); W (21–5, 21–12)	Jiménez (DOM); W (21–9, 21–5)	1Q	Sándorházi (HUN); W (21–9, 21–8)	Goh (MAS); L (21–19, 15–21, 13–21)	Hooi (SGP); W (21–9, 21–13)	3rd place, bronze medalist(s)

Team

Athlete	Event	Group stage				Quarterfinal	Semifinal	Final / BM	Rank
Athlete	Event	Opposition Score	Opposition Score	Opposition Score	Rank	Opposition Score	Opposition Score	Opposition Score	Rank
Team Omega; Kunlavut Vitidsarn (THA); Markus Barth (NOR); Oscar Guo (NZL); Chang Ho Kim (FIJ); Huang Yin-hsuan (TPE); Léonice Huet (FRA); Anastasiya Prozorova (UKR); Vũ Thị Anh Thư (VIE)	Mixed Teams	Gamma (MIX); W (110–99)	Theta (MIX); W (110–100)	Sigma (MIX); W (110–98)	1Q	Epsilon (MIX); W (110–102)	Zeta (MIX); W (110–109)	Alpha (MIX); L (106–110)	2nd place, silver medalist(s)
Team Delta; Pattarasuda Chaiwan (THA); Mateo Delmastro (ARG); Arnaud Merklé (FRA); Dmitriy Panarin (KAZ); Balázs Pápai (HUN); Elena Andreu (ESP); Madouc Linders (NED); Petra Polanc (SLO)	Mixed Teams	Zeta (MIX); W (110–95)	Alpha (MIX); W (110–99)	Epsilon (MIX); L (108–110)	1Q	Theta (MIX); L (93–110)	did not qualify		5

== Beach handball ==
Both boys' and girls' team qualified based on his performance (best Asian team) at the 2017 Youth Beach Handball World Championship in Mauritius. However, due to the rules of the Games only allowing the National Olympic Committees (NOCs) to enter one team sport (futsal, beach handball, field hockey, or rugby sevens) per gender, the event of their participation has not yet been made official.

Summary

Key:

- FT – After full time.
- P – Match decided by penalty shootout.

Summary

Team	Event	Preliminary round					Standing	Main round					Standing	Semifinals	Final / BM	
Team	Event	Opposition Score	Opposition Score	Opposition Score	Opposition Score	Opposition Score	Standing	Opposition Score	Opposition Score	Opposition Score	Opposition Score	Opposition Score	Standing	Opposition Score	Opposition Score	Rank
Thailand women's	Boys' tournament	ESP; L 1–2	VEN; W 2–0	URU; W 2–0	HUN; L 1–2	TPE; W 2–0	3 Q	ESP; L 1–2	HUN; L 1–2	ARG; W 2–1	POR; L 0–2	CRO; W 2–0	5	did not qualify		5

=== Men's tournament ===
Preliminary round

Pos	Team	Pld	W	D	L	GF	GA	GD	Pts	Qualification
1	Hungary	5	5	0	0	10	2	+8	10	Main round
2	Spain	5	4	0	1	9	3	+6	8	Main round
3	Thailand	5	3	0	2	8	4	+4	6	Main round
4	Venezuela	5	2	0	3	4	6	−2	4	Main round
5	Chinese Taipei	5	1	0	4	2	9	−7	2	
6	Uruguay	5	0	0	5	1	10	−9	0	

Source: Buenos Aires 2018
Rules for classification: 1) Points; 2) Goal difference; 3) Goals scored; 4) Head-to-head result.

== Beach volleyball ==
Phanupong Thanan and Phichakon Narathon, also Thatsarida Singchuea and Pawarun Chanthawichai qualified on their performance (boys' runners up and girls champions) at the 2018 Asian U19 Beach Volleyball Championships in Nakhon Pathom, Thailand.

Athlete	Event	Preliminary round	Standing	Round of 24	Round of 16	Quarterfinals	Semifinals	Final / BM
Athlete	Event	Opposition Score	Standing	Opposition Score	Opposition Score	Opposition Score	Opposition Score	Rank
Phanupong Thanan; Phichakon Narathon	Boys'	Pool A Sedlak – Manas (CZE); W 2–1 (21–15, 19–21, 16–14); Broch – Gysin (SUI); L 0–2 (12–21, 18–21); Zelayeta – Amieva Tarditti (ARG); L 0–2 (19–21, 20–22)	3Q	Poznanski – Miszczuk (POL); W 2–0 (21–18, 21–13)	Streli – Hajos (HUN); L 1–2 (19–21, 21–13, 9–15)	did not qualify		9
Thatsarida Singchuea; Pawarun Chanthawichai	Girls'	Pool H Corbacho – Vargas (URU); W 2–0 (21–11, 21–14); Simisterra – Castro (ECU); W 2–0 (21–11, 21–14); Alvarez Mendoza – Moreno Matveeva (ESP); L 0–2 (14–21, 18–21)	2Q	Otene – Dickson (NZL); W 2–0 (25–23, 21–13)	Ramirez – Narvaez Medina (VEN); W 2–1 (21–18, 22–24, 15–11)	Berntsen – Olimstad (NOR); L 0–2 (20–22, 16–21)	did not qualify	5

== Boxing ==
Sarawut Sukthet, Atichai Phoemsap, Weerapon Jongjohor, and Porntip Buapa qualified on their performance (Asian champions) at the 2018 Youth Asian Confederation Boxing Championships in Bangkok, Thailand.

Boys

Athlete	Event	Preliminary R1	Preliminary R2	Semifinals	Final / RM	Rank
Athlete	Event	Opposition Result	Opposition Result	Opposition Result	Opposition Result	Rank
Sarawut Sukthet	-52 kg	Naeemi (AFG); W 5–0	—N/a	Chalot De Oliveira (BRA); W 4–1	Price (GBR); L RSC R1 1:49	2nd place, silver medalist(s)
Atichai Phoemsap	-60 kg	Bye	Wilcox (CAN); W 4–1	Safarov (AZE); W 5–0	Bondarchuk (UKR); W 5–0	1st place, gold medalist(s)
Weerapon Jongjohor	-75 kg	Millas (ITA); W 4–1	—N/a	Machado (BRA); L 0–5	Poutoa (SAM); W 5–0	3rd place, bronze medalist(s)

Girls

Athlete	Event	Preliminaries	Semifinals	Final / RM	Rank
Athlete	Event	Opposition Result	Opposition Result	Opposition Result	Rank
Panpatchara Somnuek	-57 kg	Triebelova (SVK); W RSC R3 1:12	Rooney (IRL); W 4–1	Carrillo Carrillo (MEX); W 5–0	1st place, gold medalist(s)
Porntip Buapa	-60 kg	Bye	Lawson (AUS); W 5–0	Dubois (GBR); L 0–5	2nd place, silver medalist(s)

== Canoeing ==
Pornnapphan Phuangmaiming qualified based on her performance (best world ranking) at the World Qualification Tournament in Barcelona, Spain.

Girls

Athlete	Event	Qualification		Repechage		Round of 16		Quarterfinals	Semifinals	Final / BM	Rank
Athlete	Event	Time	Rank	Time	Rank	Time	Rank	Opposition Result	Opposition Result	Opposition Result	Rank
Pornnapphan Phuangmaiming	K1 slalom	1:23.64	8Q	—N/a		1:23.24	1Q	Delassus (FRA); L 1:22.07 – 1:20.29	did not qualify		6
Pornnapphan Phuangmaiming	K1 sprint	2:02.74	13	2:01.35	2Q	2:00.35	2	did not qualify			9

== Cycling ==
Kometh Sookprasert and Panadda Booranawong qualified were given two quotas to compete based on its ranking in the Youth Olympic Games BMX Junior Nation Rankings.

Athlete	Event	500 metres sprint								1000 metres sprint						5000 metres elimination			Total	
Athlete	Event	Quarterfinal		Semifinal		Final		Point	Rank	Semifinal		Final		Point	Rank	Result	Point	Rank	Point	Rank
Athlete	Event	Result	Rank	Result	Rank	Result	Rank	Point	Rank	Result	Rank	Result	Rank	Point	Rank	Result	Point	Rank	Point	Rank
Ptjira Srisathitha	Girls' combined events									1:41.878	7	did not qualify		1	14	E	1	14		

== Futsal ==
Summary

Team	Event	Group Stage					Semifinal	Final / BM	
Team	Event	Opposition Score	Opposition Score	Opposition Score	Opposition Score	Rank	Opposition Score	Opposition Score	Rank
Thailand	Girls' tournament	Spain; L 2–6	Bolivia; L 4–6	Trinidad and Tobago; W 14–0	Tonga; W 9–1	3	did not advance		

Group C

Pos	Team	Pld	W	D	L	GF	GA	GD	Pts	Qualification
1	Spain	4	4	0	0	39	5	+34	12	Semi-finals
2	Bolivia	4	3	0	1	20	17	+3	9	Semi-finals
3	Thailand	4	2	0	2	29	13	+16	6	
4	Trinidad and Tobago	4	1	0	3	10	40	−30	3	
5	Tonga	4	0	0	4	8	31	−23	0	

Source: FIFA IOC
7 October 2018
16:00

Trinidad and Tobago	0–14	Thailand
	Report (FIFA); Report (IOC)	Paerploy 2'; Techinee 5'; Ladawan 6', 12', 20', 21'; Thidarat 9', 32'; Pattarawarin 17', 38'; Yodwadee 24', 30'; Yuphawadi 27', 28'

Tecnópolis
Attendance: 2,260
Referee: Antony Riley (New Zealand)
9 October 2018
16:00

Thailand	2–6	Spain
Pattarawarin 30'; Yodwadee 31'	Report (FIFA); Report (IOC)	de las Heras 8', 13'; Agulla 16', 25'; Martínez 18'; Gulli 33'

Tecnópolis
Attendance: 960
Referee: Victor Berg (France)
10 October 2018
16:00

Bolivia	6–4	Thailand
Álvarez 8'; Gálvez 18', 22', 39'; Mendiola 20'; Fernández 25'	Report (FIFA); Report (IOC)	Yuphawadi 18', 19', 21'; Paerploy 33'

Tecnópolis
Attendance: 4,690
Referee: Roberto Sánchez (Cuba)
13 October 2018
16:00

Thailand	9–1	Tonga
Pattarawarin 6'; Yodwadee 14', 28'; Thidarat 18', 30'; Paerploy 21', 32', 33'; Yuphawadi 21'	Report (FIFA); Report (IOC)	Lutu 38'

CeNARD
Attendance: 653
Referee: Tayana Moreno (Venezuela)

== Golf ==
Individual

Athlete	Event	Round 1		Round 2			Round 3			Total		
Athlete	Event	Score	Rank	Score	Total	Rank	Score	Total	Rank	Score	Par	Rank
Atthaya Thitikul	Women's	76 (+6)	14	74 (+4)	150	11	71 (+1)	221	2	221	+11	8
Vanchai Luangnitikul	Men's	69 (−1)	1	70 (E)	139	5	73 (+3)	212	12	212	+2	4

Team

Athletes	Event	Round 1 (Fourball)		Round 2 (Foursome)		Round 3 (Individual Stroke)				Total		
Athletes	Event	Score	Rank	Score	Rank	Boy	Girl	Total	Rank	Score	Par	Rank
Atthaya Thitikul; Vanchai Luangnitikul	Mixed team	60 (−10)	2	68 (−2)	1	71	69	140 (E)	3	268	−12	1st place, gold medalist(s)

== Karate ==
Thailand qualified one athlete based on its performance at one of the Karate Qualification Tournaments.

Athlete	Event	Group phase				Semifinal	Final / BM	
Athlete	Event	Opposition Score	Opposition Score	Opposition Score	Rank	Opposition Score	Opposition Score	Rank
Aika Okazaki	Girls' −53 kg	Tahata (JPN); L 3–3	Khonakdartarsi (IRI); L 0–2	De Barros (POR); W 2–0	3	did not qualify		5

== Roller speed skating ==
Ptjira Srisathitha qualified based on her performance at the 2018 Roller Speed Skating World Championship in Heerde, Netherlands.

Individual

Athlete	Event	500 metres sprint								1000 metres sprint						5000 metres elimination			Total	
Athlete	Event	Quarterfinal		Semifinal		Final		Point	Rank	Semifinal		Final		Point	Rank	Result	Point	Rank	Point	Rank
Athlete	Event	Result	Rank	Result	Rank	Result	Rank	Point	Rank	Result	Rank	Result	Rank	Point	Rank	Result	Point	Rank	Point	Rank
Ptjira Srisathitha	Girls' combined events									1:41.878	7	did not qualify		1	14	E	1	14		

== Rowing ==
Thailand qualified one boat based on its performance at the 2018 Asian Youth Olympic Games Qualification Regatta.

- Girls' pair – 2 athletes

== Sailing ==
Thailand qualified one boat based on its performance at the IKA Twin Tip Racing Asian Qualifier.

Girls

Athlete	Event	Race												Total Points	Net Points	Final Rank
Athlete	Event	1	2	3	4	5	6	7	8	9	10	11	12	Total Points	Net Points	Final Rank
Nichanan Rodthong	IKA Twin Tip Racing	(11)	10.5	8	(12)	3	10	CAN						54.5	31.5	11

== Shooting ==
Kanyakorn Hirunphoem qualified based on her performance at the 2017 Asian Championships.

Individual

Athletes	Event	Qualification		Final	
Athletes	Event	Points	Rank	Points	Rank
Kanyakorn Hirunphoem	Girls' 10 metre air pistol	562-10x	6Q	194.3	4

Team

Athletes	Event	Qualification		Round of 16	Quarterfinals	Semifinals	Final / BM	Rank
Athletes	Event	Points	Rank	Opposition Result	Opposition Result	Opposition Result	Opposition Result	Rank
Kanyakorn Hirunphoem (THA); Omar Abdelfatah (EGY)	Mixed 10 metre air pistol	740-16x	12Q	Bhaker (IND); Fayzullaev (TJK); L 4 – 10	did not qualify			17

== Sport climbing ==
Narada Disyabut qualified based on her performance at the 2017 World Youth Championship in Innsbruck, Austria.

Individual

Athlete	Event	Event	Qualification					Final				
Athlete	Event	Event	SP	BD	LD	Total	Rank	SP	BD	LD	Total	Rank
Narada Disyabut	Girls' combined events	Results	10.85	1T 2z	1:26	3300	16	did not qualify				
Narada Disyabut	Girls' combined events	Points	11	15	20	3300	16	did not qualify				

== Swimming ==
Girls

Athlete	Event	Heat		Semifinal		Final	
Athlete	Event	Time	Rank	Time	Rank	Time	Rank
Saovanee Boonamphai	50 m backstroke	32.67	5	33.34	8	did not qualify	
Saovanee Boonamphai	100 m backstroke						

== Table tennis ==
Jinnipa Sawettabut qualified based on her performance at the Asian Qualification Event in Greater Noida, India. Also Yanapong Panagitgun qualified based on her performance at the Road to Buenos Aires – Latin America in Asunción, Paraguay.

Singles

Athlete	Event	Group Stage	Rank	Round of 16	Quarterfinals	Semifinals	Final / BM	Rank
Athlete	Event	Opposition Score	Rank	Opposition Score	Opposition Score	Opposition Score	Opposition Score	Rank
Yanapong Panagitgun	Boys	Group D Cho (KOR); L 0–4 (5:11, 7:11, 8:11, 6:11)	4	did not qualify				25
Yanapong Panagitgun	Boys	Lin (TPE); L 0–4 (9:11, 4:11, 11:13, 4:11)	4	did not qualify				25
Yanapong Panagitgun	Boys	Sidorenko (RUS); L 0–4 (3:11, 7:11, 9:11, 4:11)	4	did not qualify				25
Jinnipa Sawettabut	Girls	Group H Lundstrom (FIN); W 4–1 (9:11, 11:5, 11:9, 11:5, 11:7)	3	did not qualify				17
Jinnipa Sawettabut	Girls	Lee (HKG); L 3–4 (8:11, 7:11, 5:11, 11:9, 11:8, 11:8, 8:11)	3	did not qualify				17
Jinnipa Sawettabut	Girls	Tailakova (RUS); L 0–4 (10:12, 4:11, 8:11, 9:11)	3	did not qualify				17

Team

Athletes	Event	Group Stage	Rank	Round of 16	Quarterfinals	Semifinals	Final / BM	Rank
Athletes	Event	Opposition Score	Rank	Opposition Score	Opposition Score	Opposition Score	Opposition Score	Rank
Thailand; Yanapong Panagitgun (THA); Jinnipa Sawettabut (THA)	Mixed	Group G Intercontinental 3 Kukulkova (SVK); Pagarani (BIZ); W 2–1 (0:3, 3:0, 3:0)	3	did not qualify				17
Thailand; Yanapong Panagitgun (THA); Jinnipa Sawettabut (THA)	Mixed	Latin America 1 Díaz (PUR); Burgos (CHI); L 1–2 (2:3, 3:2, 0:3)	3	did not qualify				17
Thailand; Yanapong Panagitgun (THA); Jinnipa Sawettabut (THA)	Mixed	Russian Federation; Tailakova (RUS); Sidorenko (RUS); L 1–2 (1:3, 1:3, 3:2)	3	did not qualify				17

== Taekwondo ==
Boy

Athlete	Event	Round of 16	Quarterfinals	Semifinals	Final	Rank
Athlete	Event	Opposition Result	Opposition Result	Opposition Result	Opposition Result	Rank
Nareupong Thepsen	−63 kg	Djinodi (CHA); W 25 – 20	Dziuba (UKR); W 28 – 26	Caulo (ITA); W 15 – 14	Cho (KOR); L 16 – 21	2nd place, silver medalist(s)

Girls

Athlete	Event	Round of 16	Quarterfinals	Semifinals	Final	Rank
Athlete	Event	Opposition Result	Opposition Result	Opposition Result	Opposition Result	Rank
Areeya Chaichana	−49 kg	Semberg (ISR); L 8 – 17	did not qualify			9
Kanthinda Saengsin	−55 kg	Bye	Yang (CHN); W 3 – 2	Tzeli (GRE); W 7 – 3	Salih (MAR); W 10 – 6	1st place, gold medalist(s)

== Tennis ==
Singles

Athlete	Event	Round of 32	Round of 16	Quarterfinals	Semifinals	Final / BM	Rank
Athlete	Event	Opposition Score	Opposition Score	Opposition Score	Opposition Score	Opposition Score	Rank
Thasaporn Naklo	Girls' Singles	Joanna Garland (TPE); L 0–2; 5–7, 1–6	did not qualify				17

Doubles

Athletes	Event	Round of 32	Round of 16	Quarterfinals	Semifinals	Final / BM	Rank
Athletes	Event	Opposition Score	Opposition Score	Opposition Score	Opposition Score	Opposition Score	Rank
Thasaporn Naklo (THA); Valentina Ivanov (NZL)	Girls' Doubles	Bilokin (UKR); Dema (UKR); L 0–2; 1–6, 3–6,	did not qualify				9
Thasaporn Naklo (THA); Ali Dawani (BHN)	Mixed Doubles	Nahimana (BDI); Henning (RSA); L 0–2; 0–6, 1–6	did not qualify				9

== Weightlifting ==
Thailand qualified boys and girls (4 athletes) to the tournament.

Boys

Athlete	Event	Snatch		Clean & Jerk		Total	Rank
Athlete	Event	Result	Rank	Result	Rank	Total	Rank
Natthawat Chomchuen	−56 kg	109	2	130	2	239	2nd place, silver medalist(s)
Sittichai Tangsut	−69 kg	120	5	145	5	265	5

Girls

Athlete	Event	Snatch		Clean & jerk		Total	Rank
Athlete	Event	Result	Rank	Result	Rank	Total	Rank
Thipwara Chontavin	−63 kg	88	3	114	2	202	2nd place, silver medalist(s)
Supatchanin Khamhaeng	+63 kg	104	DSQ	132	DSQ	236	DSQ
