= Chile at the 2018 Summer Youth Olympics =

- IOC code: CHI
- NOC: Chilean Olympic Committee
- Website: http://www.coch.cl/

in Buenos Aires, Argentina 6 – 18 October 2018
- Competitors: 44 in 17 sports
- Medals: Gold 0 Silver 0 Bronze 0 Total 0

Summer Youth Olympics appearances
- 2010; 2014; 2018; 2026

Chile participated at the 2018 Summer Youth Olympics in Buenos Aires, Argentina from 6 October to 18 October 2018.

== Archery ==
Chile qualified one athlete.

Individual

| Athlete | Event | Ranking round | | Round of 32 | Round of 16 | Quarterfinals | Semifinals | Final / BM | Rank |
| Athlete | Event | Score | Seed | Opposition Score | Opposition Score | Opposition Score | Opposition Score | Opposition Score | Rank |
|---|---|---|---|---|---|---|---|---|---|
| Isabella Bassi | Girls' Individual | 631 | 19 | GNoriega (USA); L 5–6 | Did not advance | | | | 17 |

Team

| Athletes | Event | Ranking round | | Round of 32 | Round of 16 | Quarterfinals | Semifinals | Final / BM | Rank |
| Athletes | Event | Score | Seed | Opposition Score | Opposition Score | Opposition Score | Opposition Score | Opposition Score | Rank |
|---|---|---|---|---|---|---|---|---|---|
| Isabella Bassi (CHI); Ravien Dalpatadu (SRI) | Mixed team | 1298 | 20 | Tagle (PHI); Õun (EST); L 4–5 | Did not advance | | | | 17 |

== Athletics ==
Chile qualified five athletes.

Boys
Track and road events

| Athlete | Event | Stage 1 | | Stage 2 | | Total | |
| Athlete | Event | Result | Rank | Result | Rank | Total | Rank |
|---|---|---|---|---|---|---|---|
| Martín Sáenz | 110 metre hurdles | 14.17 | 13 | 14.00 | 11 | 28.17 | 12 |

Girls
Track and road events

| Athlete | Event | Stage 1 | | Stage 2 | | Total | |
| Athlete | Event | Result | Rank | Result | Rank | Total | Rank |
|---|---|---|---|---|---|---|---|
| Anaís Hernández | 100 metres | 12.48 | 17 | 12.06 | 16 | 24.54 | 16 |
| Laura Vidal | 1500 metres | 4:31.00 | 9 | 14:37 | 14 | 23 | 11 |

Field events

| Athlete | Event | Stage 1 | | Stage 2 | | Total | |
| Athlete | Event | Result | Rank | Result | Rank | Total | Rank |
|---|---|---|---|---|---|---|---|
| Javiera Contreras | Pole Vault | 3.65 | 5 | 3.62 | 8 | 7.27 | 8 |
| Rocío Muñoz | Long Jump | 5.45 | 12 | 5.61w | 12 | 11.06 | 12 |

== Badminton ==
Chile qualified one player based on the Badminton Junior World Rankings.

Singles

| Athlete | Event | Group stage | | | | Quarterfinal | Semifinal | Final / BM | Rank |
| Athlete | Event | Opposition Score | Opposition Score | Opposition Score | Rank | Opposition Score | Opposition Score | Opposition Score | Rank |
|---|---|---|---|---|---|---|---|---|---|
| Alonso Medel | Boys' Singles | Koppen (NED); L 0–2 | Rumbay (INA); L 0–2 | Nguyễn (VIE); L 0–2 | 4 | Did not advance | | | 9 |

Team

| Athlete | Event | Group stage | | | | Quarterfinal | Semifinal | Final / BM | Rank |
| Athlete | Event | Opposition Score | Opposition Score | Opposition Score | Rank | Opposition Score | Opposition Score | Opposition Score | Rank |
|---|---|---|---|---|---|---|---|---|---|
| Team Gamma; Alonso Medel (CHI); Uriel Canjura (ESA); Joel Koh (SGP); Li Shifeng (CHN); Halla Bouksani (ALG); Fernanda Saponara Rivva (PER); Jakka Vaishnavi Reddy (IND) | Mixed Teams | Omega (MIX); L (99–110) | Sigma (MIX); L (86–110) | Theta (MIX); W (110–107) | 3Q | Alpha (MIX); L (94–110) | Did not advance | | 5 |

== Beach volleyball ==
Chile qualified a boys' team based on their overall ranking from the South American Youth Tour.

- Boys' tournament - Vicente Droguett and Gaspar Lammel.

| Athletes | Event | Preliminary round | | Round of 24 | Round of 16 | Quarterfinals | Semifinals | Final / BM | |
| Athletes | Event | Opposition Score | Rank | Opposition Score | Opposition Score | Opposition Score | Opposition Score | Opposition Score | Rank |
|---|---|---|---|---|---|---|---|---|---|
| Lammel; Droguett | Boys' tournament | Jeffrey–Joe (NZL); W 2–0; Poznański–Miszczuk (POL); L 0–2; Veretiuk–Shekunov (RUS); L 0–2 | 3 Q | James–Mark (AUS); L 0–2 | Did not advance | | | | |

== Boxing ==
Chile qualified one boxer based on their performance at the 2018 Youth American Confederation Boxing Championships.

- Boys' 91 kg - Andrews Salgado

| Athlete | Event | Preliminary R1 | Preliminary R2 | Semifinals | Final / RM | Rank |
| Athlete | Event | Opposition Result | Opposition Result | Opposition Result | Opposition Result | Rank |
|---|---|---|---|---|---|---|
| Andrews Salgado | -91 kg | Canales (PUR); L 0–5 | Oralbay (KAZ); L 0–5 | Did not advance | Matthes (SAM); W 4-1 | 5 |

== Canoeing ==
Chile qualified three boats based on its performance at the 2018 World Qualification Event.

- Boys' C1 - Matías Reyes
- Girls' C1 - Isidora Arias
- Girls' K1 - Emily Valenzuela

Boys

| Athlete | Event | Qualification | | Repechage | | Quarterfinals | Semifinals | Final / BM | Rank |
| Athlete | Event | Time | Rank | Time | Rank | Opposition Result | Opposition Result | Opposition Result | Rank |
|---|---|---|---|---|---|---|---|---|---|
| Matias Eduardo Reyes | C1 sprint | 2:13.52 | 14 | 2:13.57 | 11 | Did not advance | | | |
| Matias Eduardo Reyes | C1 slalom | 1:37.84 | 11 | 1:37.36 | 7 | Did not advance | | | |

Girls

| Athlete | Event | Qualification | | Repechage | | Quarterfinals | Semifinals | Final / BM | Rank |
| Athlete | Event | Time | Rank | Time | Rank | Opposition Result | Opposition Result | Opposition Result | Rank |
|---|---|---|---|---|---|---|---|---|---|
| Isidora Jesus Arias | C1 sprint | 2:36.46 | 11 | 3:52.79 | 6 | Palamarchuk (UKR); L 2:34.91 | Did not advance | | |
| Isidora Jesus Arias | C1 slalom | 1:54.32 | 15 | 1:59.92 | 6 | Nurlanova (KAZ); L 1:53.09 | Did not advance | | |
| Emily Constanza Valenzuela | K1 sprint | 2:13.33 | 16 | 2:10.38 | 6 | Charayron (FRA); L 2:12.44 | Did not advance | | |
| Emily Constanza Valenzuela | K1 slalom | 1:32.26 | 18 | DNF | 11 | Did not advance | | | |

== Cycling ==
Chile qualified a boys' combined team based on its ranking in the Youth Olympic Games Junior Nation Rankings. They also qualified a mixed BMX racing team based on its ranking in the Youth Olympic Games BMX Junior Nation Rankings.

- Boys' combined team - Martín Vidaurre and Tomás Caulier.
- Mixed BMX racing team - Rocío Pizarro and Mauricio Molina.

Combined team

| Athlete | Event | Time trial | | | Road race | | | Cross-country Eliminator | | Cross-country Short circuit | | Criterium | | Total points | Rank |
| Athlete | Event | Time | Rank | Points | Time | Rank | Points | Rank | Points | Rank | Points | Rank | Points | Total points | Rank |
|---|---|---|---|---|---|---|---|---|---|---|---|---|---|---|---|
| Tomas Caulier | Boys' combined team | 9:25.40 | 19 | 0 | 1:31:03 | 19 | 0 | 28 | 0 | 12 | 0 | 22 | 0 | 50 | 14 |
| Martín Vidaurre | Boys' combined team | 9:25.40 | 19 | 0 | 1:31:03 | 7 | 25 | 14 | 15 | 14 | 0 | 10 | 10 | 50 | 14 |

BMX racing

| Athlete | Event | Semifinal | | Final | | | Total points | Rank |
| Athlete | Event | Points | Rank | Result | Rank | Points | Total points | Rank |
|---|---|---|---|---|---|---|---|---|
| Mauricio Molina | Mixed BMX racing | 24 | 6 | Did not advance | | 1 | 41 | 8 |
| Rocío Pizarro | Mixed BMX racing | 12 | 4 | 40.415 | 5 | 40 | 41 | 8 |

== Futsal ==
Chile qualified a girls' team based on their performance at the 2017 Copa América Femenina de Futsal

- Girls' tournament - Tais Morgenstein, Javiera Salvo, Lissette Carrasco, Lorna Campos, Sonya Keefe, Carla Pérez, Muriel Jardúa, Romina Parraguez, Grace Mora y Daniela Aguirre.

Summary

| Team | Event | Group stage | | | | | Semifinal | Final / BM | |
| Team | Event | Opposition Score | Opposition Score | Opposition Score | Opposition Score | Rank | Opposition Score | Opposition Score | Rank |
|---|---|---|---|---|---|---|---|---|---|
| Tais Morgenstein; Javiera Salvo; Lissette Carrasco; Lorna Campos; Sonya Keefe; Carla Pérez; Muriel Jardúa; Romina Parraguez; Grace Mora; Daniela Aguirre | Girls' tournament | Cameroon; L 0–5 | Japan; L 1–4 | Dominican Republic; D 3–3 | Portugal; L 2–15 | 4 | Did not advance | | |

Group D

| Pos | Team | Pld | W | D | L | GF | GA | GD | Pts | Qualification |
|---|---|---|---|---|---|---|---|---|---|---|
| 1 | Portugal | 4 | 4 | 0 | 0 | 37 | 2 | +35 | 12 | Semi-finals |
| 2 | Japan | 4 | 3 | 0 | 1 | 16 | 7 | +9 | 9 | Semi-finals |
| 3 | Cameroon | 4 | 2 | 0 | 2 | 16 | 13 | +3 | 6 | |
| 4 | Chile | 4 | 0 | 1 | 3 | 6 | 27 | −21 | 1 | |
| 5 | Dominican Republic | 4 | 0 | 1 | 3 | 6 | 32 | −26 | 1 | |

Source: FIFA IOC
7 October 2018
16:00

| Chile | 2–15 | Portugal |
|---|---|---|
| Aguirre 21'; Salvo 38' | Report (FIFA); Report (IOC) Category:Futsal at the 2018 Summer Youth Olympics – Girls First Round – CHI-POR on Wikimedia Commons | Carol 2'; Telma 4'; Fifó 7', 28', 29', 31', 39'; Martinha 8', 16', 22'; Sanheiro 19', 31', 32'; Campos 35' (o.g.); Silva 38' |

CeNARD
Attendance: 0
Referee: Ovidiu Curta (Romania)
10 October 2018
14:00

| Japan | 4–1 | Chile |
|---|---|---|
| Miyamoto 13'; Maeda 23'; Arai 27'; Carrasco 33' (o.g.) | Report (FIFA); Report (IOC) | Mora 17' |

CeNARD
Attendance: 227
Referee: Leandro Lorenzo (Argentina)
12 October 2018
14:00

| Chile | 0–5 | Cameroon |
|---|---|---|
| | Report (FIFA); Report (IOC) | Ndzana 16', 18', 22'; Campos 28' (o.g.); Mbofewuie 33' |

Tecnópolis
Attendance: 2,530
Referee: Rafael Villalba (Paraguay)
13 October 2018
14:00

| Dominican Republic | 3–3 | Chile |
|---|---|---|
| Muñiz 1'; Ditrén 7', 27' | Report (FIFA); Report (IOC) | Aguirre 26'; Pérez 36'; Keefe 40' (pen.) |

Tecnópolis
Attendance: 1,960
Referee: Lee Po-fu (Chinese Taipei)

== Karate ==
Chile qualified one athlete.

- Girls' -53 kg - Catalina Valdés

| Athlete | Event | Group phase | | | | Semifinal | Final / BM | |
| Athlete | Event | Opposition Score | Opposition Score | Opposition Score | Rank | Opposition Score | Opposition Score | Rank |
|---|---|---|---|---|---|---|---|---|
| Catalina Valdés | Girls' 53 kg | Yasmin Nasr Elgewily (EGY); L 0-7 | Dildora Alikulova (UZB); D 0-0 | Damla Ocak (TUR); L 0-2 | 4 | Did not advance | | |

== Roller speed skating ==
Chile qualified two roller skaters based on its performance at the 2018 Roller Speed Skating World Championship.

- Boys' combined speed event - Ignacio Mardones Vidal
- Girls' combined speed event - Ashly Marin Torres

== Rowing ==
Chile qualified two boats based on its performance at the American Qualification Regatta.

- Boys' pairs - José Obando and Nicolás Tapia.
- Girls' pairs - Isidora Niemeyer and Christina Hostetter.

== Shooting ==
Chile qualified one sport shooter based on its performance at the American Qualification Tournament.

- Girls' 10m Air Rifle - Isidora Van De Perre

Individual

| Athlete | Event | Qualification | | Final | |
| Athlete | Event | Points | Rank | Points | Rank |
|---|---|---|---|---|---|
| Isidora Margarita van de Perre Dios | Girls' 10 m air rifle | 606.7 | 18 | Did not advance | |

Mixed

| Athlete | Event | Qualification | | Round of 16 | Quarterfinal | Semifinal | Final | |
| Athlete | Event | Points | Rank | Opposition Score | Opposition Score | Opposition Score | Opposition Score | Rank |
|---|---|---|---|---|---|---|---|---|
| Isidora Margarita van de Perre Dios (CHI); Aleksa Mitrović (SRB) | Mixed 10m air rifle | 811.7 | 17 | Did not advance | | | | |

== Sport climbing ==
Chile qualified one sport climber based on its performance at the 2017 Pan American Youth Sport Climbing Championships.

- Girls' combined - 1 quota (Alejandra Contreras)

| Athlete | Event | Qualification | | | | | Final | | | | |
| Athlete | Event | Speed | Bouldering | Lead | Total | Rank | Speed | Bouldering | Lead | Total | Rank |
|---|---|---|---|---|---|---|---|---|---|---|---|
| Alejandra Contreras | Girls' combined | 5 | 14 | 10 | 700 | 12 | Did not advance | | | | |

== Swimming ==
Chile qualified four athletes.

Boys

| Athlete | Event | Heats | | Semifinals | | Final | |
| Athlete | Event | Time | Rank | Time | Rank | Time | Rank |
|---|---|---|---|---|---|---|---|
| Martín Valdivieso | 50 m freestyle | 24.35 | 33 | Did not advance | | | |
| Benjamin Schnapp | 50 m butterfly | 25.42 | 33 | Did not advance | | | |
| Benjamin Schnapp | 100 m butterfly | 55.75 | 29 | Did not advance | | | |
| Benjamin Schnapp | 200 m butterfly | 2:07.86 | 31 | Did not advance | | | |

Girls

| Athlete | Event | Heat | | Semifinal | | Final | |
| Athlete | Event | Time | Rank | Time | Rank | Time | Rank |
|---|---|---|---|---|---|---|---|
| Inés Marín | 50 m freestyle | 27.16 | 28 | Did not advance | | | |
| Inés Marín | 100 m freestyle | 58.98 | 36 | Did not advance | | | |
| Inés Marín | 200 m freestyle | 2:07.53 | 29 | Did not advance | | | |
| Inés Marín | 50 m butterfly | 28.99 | 32 | Did not advance | | | |
| Inés Marín | 100 m butterfly | 1:03.37 | 25 | Did not advance | | | |
| Trinidad Ardiles | 200 m backstroke | 2:24.27 | 24 | Did not advance | | | |

Mixed

| Athlete | Event | Heat | | Final | |
| Athlete | Event | Time | Rank | Time | Rank |
|---|---|---|---|---|---|
| Inés Marín; Trinidad Ardiles; Martín Valdivieso; Benjamin Schnapp | 4 × 100 m freestyle relay | 3:51.56 | 20 | Did not advance | |
| Inés Marín; Trinidad Ardiles; Martín Valdivieso; Benjamin Schnapp | 4 × 100 metre medley relay | 4:21.96 | 27 | Did not advance | |

== Table tennis ==
Chile qualified one table tennis player based on its performance at the Latin American Continental Qualifier.

- Boys' singles - Nicolas Burgos

Singles

| Athlete | Event | Group stage | Rank | Round of 16 | Quarterfinals | Semifinals | Final / BM | Rank |
| Athlete | Event | Opposition Score | Rank | Opposition Score | Opposition Score | Opposition Score | Opposition Score | Rank |
|---|---|---|---|---|---|---|---|---|
| Nicolas Ignacio Burgos | Boys' singles | Group B Nayre (PHI); L 1–4 | 2Q | Lin (TPE); L 0–4 | Did not advance | | | 9 |
| Nicolas Ignacio Burgos | Boys' singles | Jha (USA); L 2–4 | 2Q | Lin (TPE); L 0–4 | Did not advance | | | 9 |
| Nicolas Ignacio Burgos | Boys' singles | Kolodziejczyk (AUT); W 4–0 | 2Q | Lin (TPE); L 0–4 | Did not advance | | | 9 |

Team

| Athletes | Event | Group stage | Rank | Round of 16 | Quarterfinals | Semifinals | Final / BM | Rank |
| Athletes | Event | Opposition Score | Rank | Opposition Score | Opposition Score | Opposition Score | Opposition Score | Rank |
|---|---|---|---|---|---|---|---|---|
| Latin America 1 Nicolas Ignacio Burgos (CHI); Adriana Díaz (PUR) | Mixed international team | Group G Russian Federation; Tailakova (RUS); Sidorenko (RUS); L 1–2 | 2Q | Europe 5 Vovk (SLO); Ursu (MDA); L 1–2 | Did not advance | | | 9 |
| Latin America 1 Nicolas Ignacio Burgos (CHI); Adriana Díaz (PUR) | Mixed international team | Thailand; Sawettabut (THA); Panagitgun (THA); W 2–1 | 2Q | Europe 5 Vovk (SLO); Ursu (MDA); L 1–2 | Did not advance | | | 9 |
| Latin America 1 Nicolas Ignacio Burgos (CHI); Adriana Díaz (PUR) | Mixed international team | Intercontinental 3 Kukuľková (SVK); Pagerani (BIZ); W 3–0 | 2Q | Europe 5 Vovk (SLO); Ursu (MDA); L 1–2 | Did not advance | | | 9 |

== Triathlon ==
Chile qualified one athlete based on its performance at the 2018 American Youth Olympic Games Qualifier.

- Boys' individual - Cristóbal Baeza

Individual

| Athlete | Event | Swim (750m) | Trans 1 | Bike (20 km) | Trans 2 | Run (5 km) | Total Time | Rank |
|---|---|---|---|---|---|---|---|---|
| Cristobal Baeza Muñoz | Boys | 9:36 | 0:29 | 27:34 | 0:28 | 16:52 | 54:59 | 8 |

Relay

| Athlete | Event | Total Times per Athlete (Swim 250m, Bike 6.6 km, Run 1.8 km) | Total Group Time | Rank |
|---|---|---|---|---|
| Americas 1 Paula Vega (ECU); Cristobal Baeza Muñoz (CHI); Sofia Rodríguez Moreno (MEX); Andrew Shellenberger (USA) | Mixed Relay | 22:11 (3) - - - | DNF | |

== Weightlifting ==
Chile qualified two athletes.

- Boys' 85 kg - Nicolás Cuevas
- Girls' 58 kg - Yerika Ríos

Boy

| Athlete | Event | Snatch | | Clean & jerk | | Total | Rank |
| Athlete | Event | Result | Rank | Result | Rank | Total | Rank |
|---|---|---|---|---|---|---|---|
| Nicolas Rodrigo Cuevas Iborra | −85 kg | 124 | 5 | 145 | 5 | 269 | 5 |

Girl

| Athlete | Event | Snatch | | Clean & jerk | | Total | Rank |
| Athlete | Event | Result | Rank | Result | Rank | Total | Rank |
|---|---|---|---|---|---|---|---|
| Yerika Ríos | −63 kg | 66 | 9 | 80 | 9 | 146 | 9 |
