= Ayomide =

Ayọ̀mídé
- Gender: Unisex
- Language: Yoruba

Origin
- Origin: Nigerian
- Meaning: My joy has come
- Region of origin: South West Nigeria

Other names
- Variant form: Midé

pronunciation

Ayọ̀mídé is a unisex name of Yoruba origin, which means My joy has come.

== Notable people with the name ==
- Ayomide Victor Adeboyejo (born 1998), Nigerian footballer
- Samuel Ayomide Adekugbe (born 1995), Canadian soccer player
- Oluwatobiloba Ayomide Amusan (born 1997), Nigerian sprinter and hurdler
- Ayomide Emmanuel Bello (born 2002), Nigerian canoeist
- Ayomide Folorunso (born 1996), Italian hurdler
- David Ayomide Kolade Kasumu (born 1999), English footballer
- Ayomide Abifarin (born 2015), Nigerian gamer
