= Klin, Námestovo District =

Klin
- Municipality
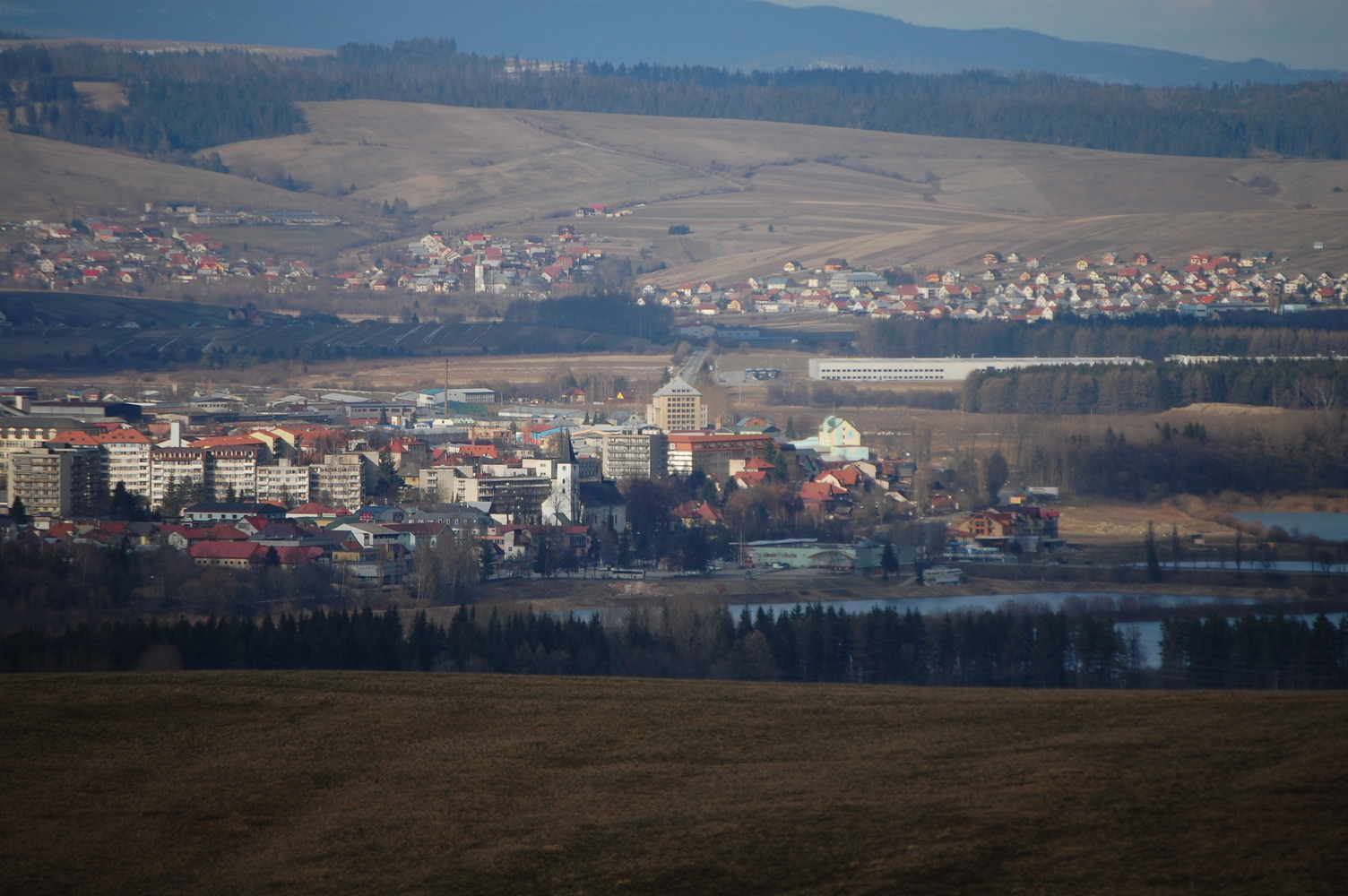

- Flag

- Location of Klin in the Žilina Region Location of Klin in Slovakia
- Coordinates: 49°26′25″N 19°29′00″E
- Country: Slovakia
- Region: Žilina Region
- District: Námestovo District
- First mentioned: 1580

Area
  - Total: 12.78 km^{2} (4.93 sq mi)
- Elevation: 630 m (2,070 ft)

Population (2025)
  - Total: 2,566
- Time zone: UTC+1 (CET)
  - Summer (DST): UTC+2 (CEST)
- Postal code: 294 1
- Area code: +421 43
- Vehicle registration plate (until 2022): NO
- Website: www.klin.sk

Klin is a village and municipality in Námestovo District in the Žilina Region of northern Slovakia.

== History ==
In historical records the village was first mentioned in 1580.

== Geography ==
The municipality lies at an altitude of 630 metres (2,070 ft) and covers an area of 12.78 km^{2} (4.93 sq mi) (2025).

== Population ==
Population statistic (10 years)
Year	1995	2005	2015	2025
Count	1855	2069	2372	2566
Difference		+11.53%	+14.64%	+8.17%

Population statistic
Year	2024	2025
Count	2549	2566
Difference		+0.66%

It has a population of 2566 people (31 December 2025).

=== Ethnicity ===
Census 2021 (1+ %)
Ethnicity	Number	Fraction
Slovak	2442	98.66%
Not found out	39	1.57%
Total	2475	

In year 2021 was 2475 people by ethnicity 2442 as Slovak, 39 as Not found out, 5 as Czech, 3 as Other, 2 as Serbian, 1 as Irish, 1 as Russian, 1 as Austrian, 1 as Polish, 1 as German, 1 as Hungarian, 1 as English and 1 as Albanian.

Note on population: The difference values of population numbers in the table "Population statistic" and in the sections "Ethnicity" & "Religion" is caused by the use of various statistical methods.

=== Religion ===
Census 2021 (1+ %)
Religion	Number	Fraction
Roman Catholic Church	2334	94.3%
None	80	3.23%
Not found out	27	1.09%
Total	2475	

In year 2021 was 2475 people by religion 2334 from Roman Catholic Church, 80 from None, 27 from Not found out, 10 from Greek Catholic Church, 6 from Evangelical Church, 4 from Eastern Orthodox Church, 4 from Christian Congregations in Slovakia, 3 from Calvinist Church, 3 from Ad hoc movements, 2 from Old Catholic Church, 1 from Jehovah's Witnesses and 1 from Other.

== Genealogical resources ==
The records for genealogical research are available at the state archive "Statny Archiv in Bytca, Slovakia"

- Roman Catholic church records (births/marriages/deaths): 1770-1900 (parish B)

== Notable people ==
- Gabriela Kaliská (born 1951) - politician
- Jessica Triebeľová (born 2001) - boxer

== See also ==
- List of municipalities and towns in Slovakia
