= Belize at the 2018 Summer Youth Olympics =

- IOC code: BIZ
- NOC: Belize Olympic and Commonwealth Games Association
- Website: www.olympic.org/belize

in Buenos Aires, Argentina
- Competitors: 2 in 2 sports
- Flag bearer: Breann Young (opening)

Summer Youth Olympics appearances
- 2010; 2014; 2018

Belize competed at the 2018 Summer Youth Olympics, in Buenos Aires, Argentina from October 6th to 18th.

The Belize team consisted of two athletes in two sports, athletics and table tennis. This marked the country's Youth Olympics debut in table tennis. Breann Young was selected to be the country's flag bearer at the opening ceremony.

== Competitors ==
The following is the list of number of competitors participating at the Games per sport/discipline.

Sport	Men	Women	Total
Athletics (track and field)	0	1	1
Table tennis	1	0	1
Total	1	1	2

== Athletics (track and field) ==
Belize received one wild card to send one girl.

Athlete	Event	Stage 1	Stage 2	Total	Final Placing
Breann Young	Girls' discus throw	30.25	21.18	51.43	15

== Table tennis ==
Belize received a wild card spot to send a boy athlete.

Singles

Athlete	Event	Group Stage	Rank	Round of 16	Quarterfinals	Semifinals	Final / BM	Rank
Athlete	Event	Opposition Score	Rank	Opposition Score	Opposition Score	Opposition Score	Opposition Score	Rank
Rohit Pagarani	Boys' singles	Group A Teodoro (BRA); L 0–4	4	did not advance				25
Rohit Pagarani	Boys' singles	Gould (AUS); L 0–4	4	did not advance				25
Rohit Pagarani	Boys' singles	Harimoto (JPN); L 0–4	4	did not advance				25

Team

Athletes	Event	Group Stage	Rank	Round of 16	Quarterfinals	Semifinals	Final / BM	Rank
Athletes	Event	Opposition Score	Rank	Opposition Score	Opposition Score	Opposition Score	Opposition Score	Rank
Intercontinental 3 Rohit Pagarani (BIZ); Tatiana Kukuľková (SVK)	Mixed international team	Group G Thailand; Sawettabut (THA); Panagitgun (THA); L 1–2	4	did not advance				25
Intercontinental 3 Rohit Pagarani (BIZ); Tatiana Kukuľková (SVK)	Mixed international team	Russian Federation; Tailakova (RUS); Sidorenko (RUS); L 1–2	4	did not advance				25
Intercontinental 3 Rohit Pagarani (BIZ); Tatiana Kukuľková (SVK)	Mixed international team	Latin America 1 Díaz (PUR); Burgos (CHI); L 0–3	4	did not advance				25

== See also ==
- Belize at the 2018 Commonwealth Games
- Belize at the 2019 Pan American Games
