= Romina Parraguez =

Chilean football and futsal player

Personal information
- Full name: Romina Helen Parraguez Leuer
- Date of birth: 26 April 2000 (age 26)
- Place of birth: Santiago, Chile
- Height: 5 ft 9 in (1.75 m)
- Position: Goalkeeper

Team information
- Current team: Vermont Fusion

College career
Years	Team	Apps	(Gls)
2020	Dixie State Trailblazers		
2021	Iowa Western Reivers		
2022	Walsh Cavaliers		

Senior career*
Years	Team	Apps	(Gls)
2016–2017	Cobresal		
2018–2019	Colo-Colo		
2021	Iowa Raptors		
2022–	Vermont Fusion		

International career
2018	Chile U18 (futsal)		
2020	Chile U20		
- * Club domestic league appearances and goals

Romina Helen Parraguez Leuer (born 26 April 2000) is a Chilean football and futsal player who plays as a goalkeeper.

== Club career ==
Born in Santiago de Chile, Parraguez began to play football at the age of eight and joined her first club at the age of twelve in Iowa, United States. Back in Chile, she joined Cobresal. After, she switched to Colo-Colo.

In 2020, she returned to the United States and played for Dixie State Trailblazers, Iowa Western Reivers and Walsh Cavaliers. between 2020 and 2022.

In 2022, she joined Vermont Fusion.

== International career ==
Initially a central midfielder, Parraguez was called up to training sessions of the Chile youth teams in 2016, switching to the goalkeeper position due to her height.

In 2018, Parraguez represented the Chile under-18 futsal team in the Summer Youth Olympics.

In 2020, she represented Chile at under-20 level in friendlies and the South American Football Championship.

== Personal life ==
Parraguez was born in Santiago, Chile, to a Chilean father and an American mother. She moved to the United States at early age and return to Chile in 2016, settling in Rancagua.

Due to his heritage, she took part in a documental webseries produced by ANFP called #SomosChile (#WeAreChile) about racial diversity in Chile, alongside the international footballers Nozomi Kimura (Japanese descent), Yessenia Huenteo (Mapuche descent) and Pedro Campos (Cuban descent).
