= Canoeing at the 2018 Summer Youth Olympics – Boys' C1 slalom =

Boys' C1 slalom at the III Summer Youth Olympic Games
- Venue: Puerto Madero
- Dates: October 15
- Competitors: 16 from 16 nations

Medalists
1st place, gold medalist(s)		Terence Benjamin Saramandif; Mauritius
2nd place, silver medalist(s)		Finn Anderson; New Zealand
3rd place, bronze medalist(s)		Yoel Becerra Bernárdez; Spain

These are the results for the boys' C1 slalom event at the 2018 Summer Youth Olympics.

== Results ==
=== Qualification ===
Rank	Athlete	Nation	Time	Notes
1	Terence Benjamin Saramandif	Mauritius	1:19.84	Q
2	Finn Anderson	New Zealand	1:20.26	Q
3	Taras Kuzyk	Ukraine	1:23.49	Q
4	Yoel Becerra Bernárdez	Spain	1:23.75	Q
5	Dias Bakhraddin	Kazakhstan	1:23.85	
6	Joaquin Ezequiel Lukac	Argentina	1:24.91	
7	Sobhan Beiranvand	Iran	1:27.60	
8	Balázs Palla	Hungary	1:28.48	
9	Tim Bechtold	Germany	1:30.76	
10	Jiří Minařík	Czech Republic	1:37.12	
11	Matias Eduardo Reyes	Chile	1:37.84	
12	Miguel Adrian Figueroa Vargas	Mexico	1:38.38	
	Islomjon Abdusalomov	Uzbekistan	DSQ	
	Alex Antunes	São Tomé and Príncipe	DSQ	
	Diego Araújo do Nascimento	Brazil	DSQ	
	César Soares	Portugal	DSQ	

=== Repechages ===
Rank	Athlete	Nation	Time	Notes
1	Dias Bakhraddin	Kazakhstan	1:23.98	Q
2	Tim Bechtold	Germany	1:25.34	Q
3	Balázs Palla	Hungary	1:27.40	Q
4	Sobhan Beiranvand	Iran	1:27.62	Q
5	Joaquin Ezequiel Lukac	Argentina	1:28.39	
6	Miguel Adrian Figueroa Vargas	Mexico	1:35.39	
7	Matias Eduardo Reyes	Chile	1:37.36	
8	Jiří Minařík	Czech Republic	1:43.78	

=== Quarterfinals ===
Race	Rank	Athlete	Nation	Time	Notes
1	1	Terence Benjamin Saramandif	Mauritius	1:18.49	QFS
1	2	Dias Bakhraddin	Kazakhstan	1:24.28	
2	1	Finn Anderson	New Zealand	1:24.44	QFS
2	2	Tim Bechtold	Germany	1:24.81	
3	1	Taras Kuzyk	Ukraine	1:23.87	QFS
3	2	Balázs Palla	Hungary	1:29.05	
4	1	Yoel Becerra Bernárdez	Spain	1:23.90	QFS
4	2	Sobhan Beiranvand	Iran	1:25.72	

=== Semifinals ===
Race	Rank	Athlete	Nation	Time	Notes
1	1	Terence Benjamin Saramandif	Mauritius	1:19.02	QFG
1	2	Yoel Becerra Bernárdez	Spain	1:28.80	QFB
2	1	Finn Anderson	New Zealand	1:20.57	QFG
2	2	Taras Kuzyk	Ukraine	1:22.64	QFB

=== Finals ===
Rank	Athlete	Nation	Time	Notes
Gold Medal Race
1st place, gold medalist(s)	Terence Benjamin Saramandif	Mauritius	1:18.86	
2nd place, silver medalist(s)	Finn Anderson	New Zealand	1:23.26	
Bronze Medal Race
3rd place, bronze medalist(s)	Yoel Becerra Bernárdez	Spain	1:23.22	
4	Taras Kuzyk	Ukraine	1:24.01	
