= Chinese Taipei at the 2018 Summer Youth Olympics =

- IOC code: TPE
- NOC: Chinese Taipei Olympic Committee

in Buenos Aires
- Competitors: 59 in 19 sports
- Medals Ranked 71st: Gold 0 Silver 1 Bronze 2 Total 3

Summer Youth Olympics appearances (overview)
- 2010; 2014; 2018

Chinese Taipei participated at the 2018 Summer Youth Olympics, in Buenos Aires, Argentina from 6 October to 18 October 2018.

== Archery ==
Chinese Taipei qualified two athlete based on its performance at the 2017 World Archery Youth Championships.

Individual

Athlete	Event	Ranking round		Round of 32	Round of 16	Quarterfinals	Semifinals	Final / BM	Rank
Athlete	Event	Score	Seed	Opposition Score	Opposition Score	Opposition Score	Opposition Score	Opposition Score	Rank
Tang Chih-chun	Boys' Individual	689	2	Juhel (MRI); W 6–0	Cowles (USA); L 1–7	did not advance			9
Chang Rong-jia	Girls' Individual	662	5	Satır (TUR); W 6–4	Touraine-Helias (FRA); W 6–2	Son (KOR); L 0–6	did not advance		8

Team

Athletes	Event	Ranking round		Round of 32	Round of 16	Quarterfinals	Semifinals	Final / BM	Rank
Athletes	Event	Score	Seed	Opposition Score	Opposition Score	Opposition Score	Opposition Score	Opposition Score	Rank
Tang Chih-chun (TPE); Rebecca Jones (NZL)	Mixed Team	1276	28	Reisenweber (GER); Fabrizzi (ITA); W 6–2	Hnin (MYA); Ak (TUR); W 5–1	Tagle (PHI); Õun (EST); W 5–1	Giannasio (ARG); Soithong (THA); L 0–6	Reddig (NAM); Cowles (USA); L 3–5	4
Chang Rong-jia (TPE); Benjamen Lee (CAN)	Mixed Team	1298	22	Touraine-Helias (FRA); Solera (ESP); L 0–6	did not advance				17

== Badminton ==
Chinese Taipei qualified two players based on the Badminton Junior World Rankings.

Singles

Athlete	Event	Group stage				Quarterfinal	Semifinal	Final / BM	Rank
Athlete	Event	Opposition Score	Opposition Score	Opposition Score	Rank	Opposition Score	Opposition Score	Opposition Score	Rank
Chen Shiau-cheng	Boys' Singles	Papai (HUN); W 2–0	Grimley (GBR); W 2–0	Guo (NZL); W 2–0	1Q	Naraoka (JPN); L 0–2	did not advance		5
Huang Yin-hsuan	Girls' Singles	Fung (AUS); W 2–0	Linders (NED); W 2–0	Lima (BRA); W 2–0	1Q	Wang (CHN); L 0–2	did not advance		5

Team

Athlete	Event	Group stage				Quarterfinal	Semifinal	Final / BM	Rank
Athlete	Event	Opposition Score	Opposition Score	Opposition Score	Rank	Opposition Score	Opposition Score	Opposition Score	Rank
Team Epsilon; Chen Shiau-cheng (TPE); Fabricio Farias (BRA); Nguyễn Hải Đăng (VIE); Tomas Toledano (ESP); Goh Jin Wei (MAS); Vlada Gînga (MDA); Aminat Oluwafunke Ilori (NGR); Nazlıcan İnci (TUR)	Mixed Teams	Alpha (MIX); L (98–110)	Zeta (MIX); L (89–110)	Delta (MIX); W (110–108)	4Q	Omega (MIX); L (102–110)	did not advance		5
Team Omega; Huang Yin-hsuan (TPE); Markus Barth (NOR); Oscar Guo (NZL); Chang Ho Kim (FIJ); Kunlavut Vitidsarn (THA); Léonice Huet (FRA); Anastasiya Prozorova (UKR); Vũ Thị Anh Thư (VIE)	Mixed Teams	Gamma (MIX); W (110–99)	Theta (MIX); W (110–100)	Sigma (MIX); W (110–98)	1Q	Epsilon (MIX); W (110–102)	Zeta (MIX); W (110–109)	Alpha (MIX); L (106–110)	2nd place, silver medalist(s)

== Canoeing ==
Chinese Taipei qualified one boat based on its performance at the 2018 World Qualification Event.

- Girls' K1 - 1 boat

Athlete	Event	Qualification		Repechage		Last 16	Quarterfinals	Semifinals	Final / BM	Rank
Athlete	Event	Time	Rank	Time	Rank	Opposition Result	Opposition Result	Opposition Result	Opposition Result	Rank
Lai Tzu-hsuan	K1 sprint	2:01.24	10	2:02.89	3	Zint (GER); L 2:05.96	did not advance			
Lai Tzu-hsuan	K1 slalom	1:21.89	3	Bye		Rendessy (HUN); W 1:23.03	Spibar (USA); W 1:20.76	Luknárová (SVK); L 1:22.67	Lewandowski (GER); L 2:05.96	3rd place, bronze medalist(s)

== Dancesport ==
Chinese Taipei qualified one dancer based on its performance at the 2018 World Youth Breaking Championship.

- B-Boys - KennyG

== Fencing ==
Chinese Taipei qualified one athlete based on its performance at the 2018 Cadet World Championship.

- Boys' Foil - Chen Yi-tung

== Golf ==
Individual

Athlete	Event	Round 1		Round 2			Round 3			Total		
Athlete	Event	Score	Rank	Score	Total	Rank	Score	Total	Rank	Score	Par	Rank
An Ho-yu	Girls' Individual	71 (+1)	2	72 (+2)	143	5	78 (+8)	221	26	221	+11	8
Lin Chuan-tai	Boys' Individual	72 (+2)	9	73 (+3)	145	12	77 (+7)	222	22	222	+12	14

Team

Athletes	Event	Round 1 (Fourball)		Round 2 (Foursome)		Round 3 (Individual Stroke)				Total		
Athletes	Event	Score	Rank	Score	Rank	Girl	Boy	Total	Rank	Score	Par	Rank
An Ho-yu; Lin Chuan-tai	Mixed team	67 (-3)	22	73 (+3)	10	72	74	146 (+6)	11	286	+6	13

== Gymnastics ==
=== Artistic ===
Chinese Taipei qualified one gymnast based on its performance at the 2018 Asian Junior Championship.

- Boys' artistic individual all-around - 1 quota

== Judo ==
Individual

Athlete	Event	Round of 16	Quarterfinals	Semifinals	Rep 1	Rep 2	Rep 3	Final / BM	
Athlete	Event	Opposition Result	Opposition Result	Opposition Result	Opposition Result	Opposition Result	Opposition Result	Opposition Result	Rank
Wu Xiao-zhang	Boys' 100 kg	Julián Gutiérrez (MEX); W 10–00	Ömer Aydın (TUR); L 00s1–01	did not advance	Bye	Rok Pogorevc (SLO); L 000–10s1	did not advance		
Liu Li-ling	Girls' 78 kg	Shakhida Narmukhamedova (KGZ); W 10–00s1	Ester Svobodová (CZE); L 00–10	did not advance	Bye	Tiguidanke Camara (GUI); W 10–00	Edith Ortiz (ECU); L 00s2–10	did not advance	

Team

Athletes	Event	Round of 16	Quarterfinals	Semifinals	Final	
Athletes	Event	Opposition Result	Opposition Result	Opposition Result	Opposition Result	Rank
Team Beijing; Artsiom Kolasau (BLR); Liu Li-ling (TPE); Jaykhunbek Nazarov (UZB); Carlos Páez (VEN); Itzel Pecha (MEX); Ana Viktorija Puljiz (CRO); Veronica Toniolo (ITA)	Mixed team	Team Montreal (MIX); W 5–2	Team Nanjing (MIX); W 4–3	Team London (MIX); W 7–0	Team Athens (MIX); W 4–3	1st place, gold medalist(s)
Seoul; Mohammed Al-Mishri (LBA); Alex Barto (SVK); Sairy Colón (PUR); María Giménez (VEN); Yuri Israelyan (ARM); Kim Ju-hee (KOR); Omaria Ramírez (DOM); Wu Xiao-zhang (TPE)	Mixed team	Los Angeles (MIX); L 3–5	did not advance			9

== Roller speed skating ==
Chinese Taipei qualified two roller skaters based on its performance at the 2018 Roller Speed Skating World Championship.

- Boys' combined speed event - Chang Chia-wei
- Girls' combined speed event - Wang Kuan-chih

== Rowing ==
Chinese Taipei qualified one boat based on its performance at the 2018 Asian Youth Olympic Games Qualification Regatta.

- Girls' single sculls - 1 athlete

== Sailing ==
Chinese Taipei qualified one boat based on its performance at the 2018 Singapore Open (Asian Techno 293+ Qualifiers).

- Girls' Techno 293+ - 1 boat

Athlete	Event	Race													Net points	Final rank
Athlete	Event	1	2	3	4	5	6	7	8	9	10	11	12	M*	Net points	Final rank
Wang Chih-ling	Girls' Techno 293+	13	17	24^{†} UFD	14		16	16	17	19	17	16	13	10	168	17

== Shooting ==
Chinese Taipei qualified one sport shooter based on its performance at the 2017 Asian Championships.

- Girls' 10m Air Rifle - 1 quota

Athlete	Event	Qualification		Final	
Athlete	Event	Points	Rank	Points	Rank
Chen Yun-Yun	Girls' 10 metre air rifle	617.7	11	did not advance	

Team

Athletes	Event	Qualification		Round of 16	Quarterfinals	Semifinals	Final / BM	Rank
Athletes	Event	Points	Rank	Opposition Result	Opposition Result	Opposition Result	Opposition Result	Rank
Chen Yun-Yun (TPE); Arnab Sharar (BAN)	Mixed 10 metre air rifle	815.5	15Q	Pardabaeva (UZB); Shamakov (RUS); W 10–7	Martínez (MEX); Wadlegger (AUT); L 8–10	did not advance		8

== Table tennis ==
Chinese Taipei qualified two table tennis players based on its performance at the Asian Continental Qualifier.

- Boys' singles - Lin Yun-ju
- Girls' singles - Su Pei-ling

== Taekwondo ==
Athlete	Event	Round of 16	Quarterfinals	Semifinals	Final	
Athlete	Event	Opposition Result	Opposition Result	Opposition Result	Opposition Result	Rank
Qiu Hong-sheng	Boys' 73 kg	David Robleto (NCA); W 15-8	Ali Eshkevarian (IRI); L 17-19	did not advance		
Lee Meng-en	Boys' +73 kg	—N/a	Jakub Sadurski (POL); W 10-2	Ethan McClymont (CAN); W 15-7	Mohammadali Khosravi (IRI); L 1-2	2nd place, silver medalist(s)

== Tennis ==
Singles

Athlete	Event	Round of 32	Round of 16	Quarterfinals	Semifinals	Final / BM	
Athlete	Event	Opposition Score	Opposition Score	Opposition Score	Opposition Score	Opposition Score	Rank
Ray Ho	Boys' singles	Báez (ARG); L (4-6, 1-6)	did not advance				17
Tseng Chun Hsin	Boys' singles	Tashbulatov (KAZ); W (6-3, 6–4)	Mu (CHN); W (6-3, 3–6, 6-2)	Díaz Acosta (ARG); L (2-6, 4-6)	did not advance		5
Joanna Garland	Girls' singles	Naklo (THA); W (7-5, 6-1)	Świątek (POL); L (6-4, 3-6, 1-6)	did not advance			9
Liang En Shuo	Girls' singles	Vismane (LAT); L (5-7, 2-6)	did not advance				17

Doubles

Athletes	Event	Round of 32	Round of 16	Quarterfinals	Semifinals	Final / BM	
Athletes	Event	Opposition Score	Opposition Score	Opposition Score	Opposition Score	Opposition Score	Rank
Ray Ho; Tseng Chun Hsin	Boys' doubles	—N/a	Báez (ARG) / Díaz Acosta (ARG); L (5-7, 2-6)	did not advance			9
Joanna Garland; Liang En Shuo	Girls' doubles	—N/a	Rakhimova (RUS) / Selekhmeteva (RUS); L (0-6, 1-6)	did not advance			9
Joanna Garland; Tseng Chun Hsin	Mixed doubles	Curmi (MLT) / Díaz Acosta (ARG); W (6-2, 3-6, [10-3])	Rivera Corado (GUA) / Hardt (DOM); W (6-4, 6-2)	Naito (JPN) / Tajima (JPN); L (1-6, 0-6)	did not advance		5
Liang En Shuo; Ray Ho	Mixed doubles	Osorio (COL) / Mejía (COL); L (7-5, 3-6, [8–10])	did not advance				17

== Weightlifting ==
Chinese Taipei qualified a male weightlifter based on its performance at the 2017 World Youth Championships. They later qualified a female weightlifter based their performance at the 2018 Asian Youth Championships.

- Boys' events - 1 quota
- Girls' events - 1 quota
