= Canoeing at the 2018 Summer Youth Olympics – Girls' K1 slalom =

Girls' K1 slalom at the III Summer Youth Olympic Games
- Venue: Puerto Madero
- Dates: October 15
- Competitors: 20 from 16 nations

Medalists
1st place, gold medalist(s)		Emanuela Luknárová	Slovakia
2nd place, silver medalist(s)		Doriane Delassus	France
3rd place, bronze medalist(s)		Lai Tzu-hsuan	Chinese Taipei

These are the results for the girls' K1 slalom event at the 2018 Summer Youth Olympics.

== Results ==
=== Qualification ===
Rank	Athlete	Nation	Time	Notes
1	Emanuela Luknárová	Slovakia	1:18.97	Q
2	Doriane Delassus	France	1:21.44	Q
3	Lai Tzu-hsuan	Chinese Taipei	1:21.89	Q
4	Zola Charlotte Marion Lewandowski	Germany	1:22.63	Q
5	Ria Spibar	United States	1:22.76	Q
6	Katarína Pecsuková	Slovakia	1:23.36	Q
7	Blessing Toboh Amusar	Nigeria	1:23.53	Q
8	Pornnapphan Phuangmaiming	Thailand	1:23.64	Q
9	Romane Charayron	France	1:24.46	
10	Stella Sukhanova	Kazakhstan	1:25.55	
11	Ayomide Emmanuel Bello	Nigeria	1:25.73	
12	Eszter Rendessy	Hungary	1:25.78	
13	Lizanne Conradie	South Africa	1:27.57	
14	Lucrezia Zironi	Italy	1:27.90	
15	Adela Házová	Czech Republic	1:28.81	
16	Jenaya Massie	Australia	1:30.34	
17	Gina Zint	Germany	1:30.87	
18	Emily Constanza Valenzuela	Chile	1:32.26	
19	Andrea Rocha Donias	Mexico	1:42.49	
	Rebecca D'Estefano	Argentina	DNF	

=== Repechages ===
Rank	Athlete	Nation	Time	Notes
1	Lucrezia Zironi	Italy	1:23.79	Q
2	Romane Charayron	France	1:26.03	Q
3	Eszter Rendessy	Hungary	1:27.48	Q
4	Jenaya Massie	Australia	1:28.08	Q
5	Stella Sukhanova	Kazakhstan	1:28.88	Q
6	Ayomide Emmanuel Bello	Nigeria	1:29.99	Q
7	Gina Zint	Germany	1:31.29	Q
8	Lizanne Conradie	South Africa	1:32.01	Q
9	Adela Házová	Czech Republic	1:34.52	
10	Andrea Rocha Donias	Mexico	1:42.96	
11	Emily Constanza Valenzuela	Chile	DNF	

=== Last 16 ===
Race	Rank	Athlete	Nation	Time	Notes
1	1	Emanuela Luknárová	Slovakia	1:18.33	Q
1	2	Lucrezia Zironi	Italy	1:29.73	
2	1	Doriane Delassus	France	1:21.03	Q
2	2	Romane Charayron	France	1:25.00	
3	1	Lai Tzu-hsuan	Chinese Taipei	1:23.03	Q
3	2	Eszter Rendessy	Hungary	1:28.00	
4	1	Zola Charlotte Marion Lewandowski	Germany	1:22.21	Q
4	2	Jenaya Massie	Australia	1:27.58	
5	1	Ria Spibar	United States	1:20.44	Q
5	2	Stella Sukhanova	Kazakhstan	1:28.38	
6	1	Katarína Pecsuková	Slovakia	1:22.56	Q
6	2	Ayomide Emmanuel Bello	Nigeria	1:29.12	
7	1	Blessing Toboh Amusar	Nigeria	1:25.00	Q
7	2	Gina Zint	Germany	1:30.65	
8	1	Pornnapphan Phuangmaiming	Thailand	1:23.24	Q
8	2	Lizanne Conradie	South Africa	1:26.06	

=== Quarterfinals ===
Race	Rank	Athlete	Nation	Time	Notes
1	1	Emanuela Luknárová	Slovakia	1:17.40	QFS
1	2	Katarína Pecsuková	Slovakia	1:22.84	
2	1	Lai Tzu-hsuan	Chinese Taipei	1:20.76	QFS
2	2	Ria Spibar	United States	1:21.19	
3	1	Doriane Delassus	France	1:20.29	QFS
3	2	Pornnapphan Phuangmaiming	Thailand	1:22.07	
4	1	Zola Charlotte Marion Lewandowski	Germany	1:21.83	QFS
4	2	Blessing Toboh Amusar	Nigeria	1:24.21	

=== Semifinals ===
Race	Rank	Athlete	Nation	Time	Notes
1	1	Emanuela Luknárová	Slovakia	1:18.44	QFG
1	2	Lai Tzu-hsuan	Chinese Taipei	1:22.67	QFB
2	1	Doriane Delassus	France	1:19.90	QFG
2	2	Zola Charlotte Marion Lewandowski	Germany	1:21.55	QFB

=== Finals ===
Rank	Athlete	Nation	Time	Notes
Gold Medal Race
1st place, gold medalist(s)	Emanuela Luknárová	Slovakia	1:18.25	
2nd place, silver medalist(s)	Doriane Delassus	France	1:20.00	
Bronze Medal Race
3rd place, bronze medalist(s)	Lai Tzu-hsuan	Chinese Taipei	1:21.58	
4	Zola Charlotte Marion Lewandowski	Germany	1:22.02	
