= Terence Benjamin Saramandif =

Mauritian canoeist

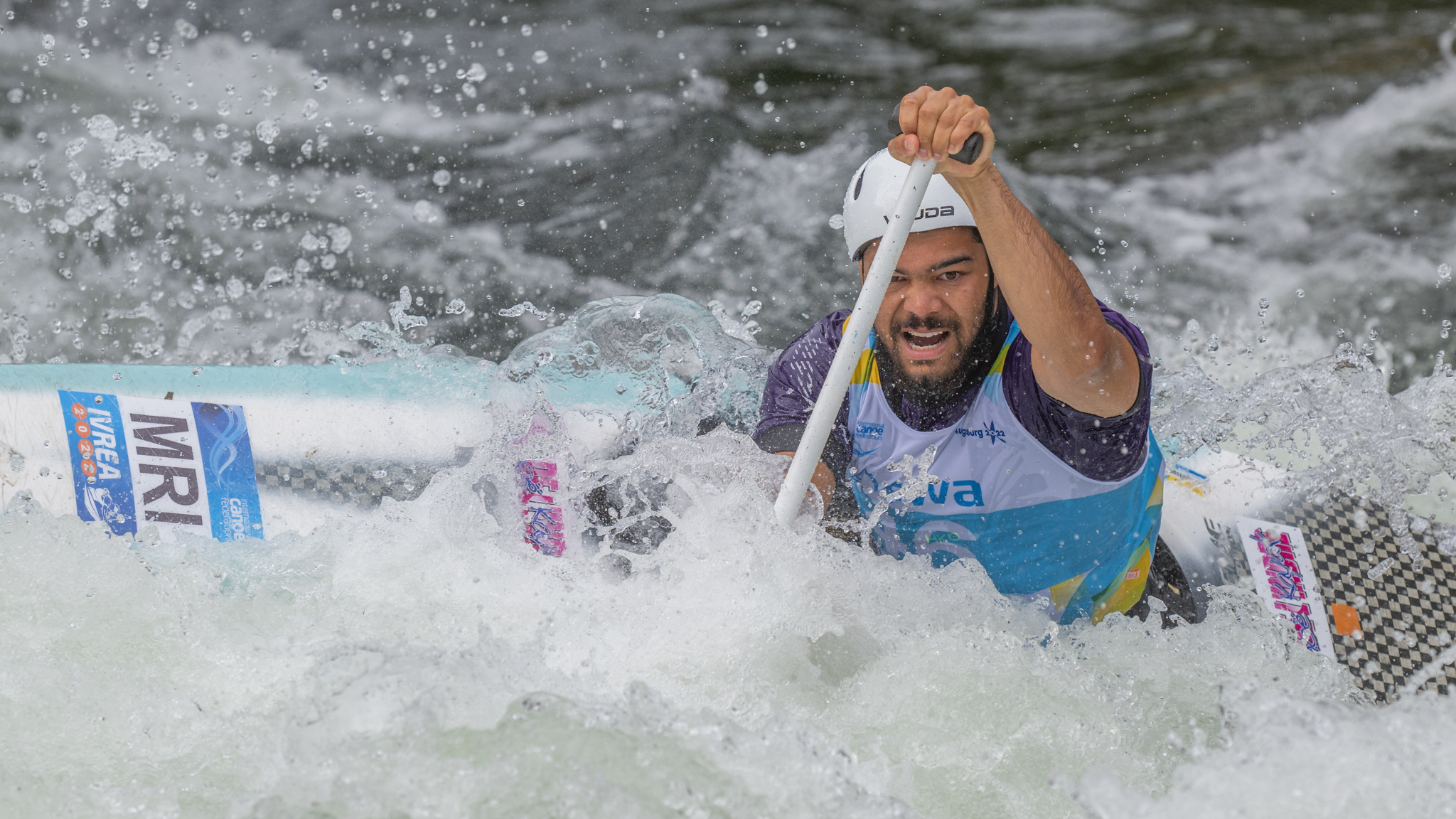
- Terence Benjamin Saramandif performing at 2022 ICF Canoe Slalom World Championships in Augsburg, Germany

Personal information
- Nationality: Mauritian
- Born: 29 March 2002 (age 24)

Sport
- Country: Mauritius
- Sport: Canoe slalom
- Event: C1
- Coached by: Kilian Foulon
Medal record
Men's canoe slalom
Representing Mauritius
Youth Olympic Games
Gold medal – first place	2018 Buenos Aires	C1
African Youth Games
Gold medal – first place	2018 Algiers	C1 Slalom
Bronze medal – third place	2018 Algiers	C1 Sprint

Terence Benjamin Saramandif (born 29 March 2002) is a Mauritian slalom canoeist who has competed at the international level since 2017. He won a gold medal at the 2018 Summer Youth Olympics in C1 Obstacle Slalom event.

Saramandif also won two medals at the 2018 African Youth Games with a gold in C1 Slalom and a bronze in C1 sprint. He placed 30th and 16th in the C1 event at the 2018 and 2019 Junior World Championships, respectively, and 25th in the same event at the 2021 U23 World Championships in Tacen.
