= Nigeria at the 2018 Summer Youth Olympics =

- IOC code: NGR
- NOC: Nigeria Olympic Committee
- Website: http://www.nigerianoc.org/

in Buenos Aires, Argentina 6 – 18 October 2018
- Competitors: 17 in 8 sports
- Medals Ranked 48th: Gold 1 Silver 3 Bronze 0 Total 4

Summer Youth Olympics appearances (overview)
- 2010; 2014; 2018

Nigeria participated at the 2018 Summer Youth Olympics in Buenos Aires, Argentina from 6 October to 18 October 2018.

== Athletics ==
Boys
Track and road events

Athlete	Event	Stage 1		Stage 2		Total	
Athlete	Event	Result	Rank	Result	Rank	Total	Rank
Alaba Akintola	100 m	10.76	2	10.24	2	21.00	2nd place, silver medalist(s)

Field events

Athlete	Event	Stage 1		Stage 2		Total	
Athlete	Event	Result	Rank	Result	Rank	Total	Rank
Ineh Oritsemeyiwa	Triple jump	16.34	2	15.51	6	31.85	2nd place, silver medalist(s)

Girls
Track and road events

Athlete	Event	Stage 1		Stage 2		Total	
Athlete	Event	Result	Rank	Result	Rank	Total	Rank
Rosemary Chukuma	100 m	12.03	3	11.17	1	23.20	1st place, gold medalist(s)
Favour Ofili	400 m	57.51	13	55.51	5	1:53.02	10

Field events

Athlete	Event	Stage 1		Stage 2		Total	
Athlete	Event	Result	Rank	Result	Rank	Total	Rank
Victory George	Long jump	5.58	11	5.71	11	11.29	11

== Badminton ==
Nigeria was given a quota to compete by the tripartite committee.

- Girls' singles – 1 quota

Singles

Athlete	Event	Group stage				Quarterfinal	Semifinal	Final / BM	Rank
Athlete	Event	Opposition Score	Opposition Score	Opposition Score	Rank	Opposition Score	Opposition Score	Opposition Score	Rank
Aminat Oluwafunke Ilori	Girls' Singles	Chaiwan (THA); L (1–21, 4–21)	Jiménez (DOM); L (17–21, 9–21)	Ambalangodage (SRI); L (8–21, 9–21)	4	did not advance			9

Team

Athlete	Event	Group stage				Quarterfinal	Semifinal	Final / BM	Rank
Athlete	Event	Opposition Score	Opposition Score	Opposition Score	Rank	Opposition Score	Opposition Score	Opposition Score	Rank
Team Epsilon; Aminat Oluwafunke Ilori (NGR); Chen Shiau-cheng (TPE); Fabricio Farias (BRA); Nguyễn Hải Đăng (VIE); Tomas Toledano (ESP); Goh Jin Wei (MAS); Vlada Gînga (MDA); Nazlıcan İnci (TUR)	Mixed Teams	Alpha (MIX); L (98–110)	Zeta (MIX); L (89–110)	Delta (MIX); W (110–108)	4Q	Omega (MIX); L (102–110)	did not advance		5

== Boxing ==
Girls

Athlete	Event	Preliminaries	Semifinals	Final / RM	Rank
Athlete	Event	Opposition Result	Opposition Result	Opposition Result	Rank
Adijat Gbadamosi	-51 kg	Bye	Stoeva (BUL); W 4–1	La Piana (ITA); L 0–5	2nd place, silver medalist(s)
Fatimo Aramokola	-60 kg	Lawson (AUS); L 0–5	did not advance		5

== Canoeing ==
Nigeria qualified two boats based on its performance at the 2018 World Qualification Event.

- Girls' C1 - 1 boat
- Girls' K1 - 1 boat

Girls

Athlete	Event	Qualification		Repechage		Round of 16	Quarterfinals	Semifinals	Final / BM	Rank
Athlete	Event	Time	Rank	Time	Rank	Opposition Result	Opposition Result	Opposition Result	Opposition Result	Rank
Blessing Toboh Amusar	C1 sprint	2:28.59	9	2:34.37	3	Gonczol (HUN); L 2:32.75	did not advance			
Blessing Toboh Amusar	C1 slalom	2:01.24	10	DNF	8	Hein (USA); L DSQ	did not advance			
Blessing Toboh Amusar	K1 sprint	1:41.04	11	DSQ	11	did not advance				
Blessing Toboh Amusar	K1 slalom	1:23.53	7	Bye		Bello (NGR); W 1:25.00	Lewandowski (GER); L 1:24.21	did not advance		
Ayomide Emmanuel Bello	C1 sprint	2:32.35	10	2:25.62	1	Fayzieva (UZB); L 2:23.12	did not advance			
Ayomide Emmanuel Bello	C1 slalom	1:31.18	5	Bye		Marusava (BLR); W 1:35.15	Delassus (FRA); L 1:34.03	did not advance		
Ayomide Emmanuel Bello	K1 sprint	2:11.61	15	2:14.68	8	D'Estefano (ARG); L DSQ	did not advance			
Ayomide Emmanuel Bello	K1 slalom	1:25.73	11	1:29.99	6	Amusar (NGR); L 1:29.12	did not advance			

== Golf ==
Nigeria received a quota of two athletes to compete by the tripartite committee.

Individual

Athlete	Event	Round 1		Round 2			Round 3			Total		
Athlete	Event	Score	Rank	Score	Total	Rank	Score	Total	Rank	Score	Par	Rank
Georgia Oboh	Girls' Individual	81 (+11)	25	82 (+12)	163	29	71 (+1)	234	2	234	+24	22
Jordan Thompson	Boys' Individual	101 (+31)	32	87 (+17)	188	32	89 (+19)	277	31	277	+67	31

Team

Athletes	Event	Round 1 (Fourball)		Round 2 (Foursome)		Round 3 (Individual Stroke)				Total		
Athletes	Event	Score	Rank	Score	Rank	Girl	Boy	Total	Rank	Score	Par	Rank
Georgia Oboh; Jordan Thompson	Mixed team	71 (+1)	30	79 (+9)	25	76	87	163 (+23)	31	313	+33	30

== Table tennis ==
Nigeria qualified one table tennis player based on its performance at the African Continental Qualifier.

- Girls' singles - Esther Oribamise

== Weightlifting ==
Athlete	Event	Snatch		Clean & jerk		Total	Rank
Athlete	Event	Result	Rank	Result	Rank	Total	Rank
Islamiyat Yusuf	Girls' -58 kg	78	4	95	4	173	4

== Wrestling ==
Based on its performance at the 2018 African Cadet Championships Nigeria has two female wrestlers in a qualifying position.

Key:
- VFA – Victory by Fall
- VSU – Without any points scored by the opponent
- VSU1 – With point(s) scored by the opponent
- VPO – Without any points scored by the opponent
- VPO1 – With point(s) scored by the opponent

Athlete	Event	Group stage					Final / RM	Rank
Athlete	Event	Opposition Score	Opposition Score	Opposition Score	Opposition Score	Rank	Opposition Score	Rank
Christianah Ogunsanya	Girls' freestyle −43kg	Martinez (BRA); L 9 – 6 ^{VFA}	Vigouroux (FRA); L 0 – 1 ^{VPO}	Nazarova (AZE); L 0 – 6 ^{VFA}	Shilson (USA); L 0 – 2 ^{VFA}	5 Q	Derry (NZL); W WO	9
Sunmisola Balogun	Girls' freestyle −65kg	Nabaina (CMR); W 10 – 0 ^{VSU}	Vesso (EST); W 7 – 0 ^{VPO}	Chudyk (UKR); L 1 – 2 ^{VPO1}	Sghaier (TUN); W 9 – 0 ^{VPO}	2 Q	Tamir (MGL); L 4 – 15 ^{VSU1}	4
