= Ayomide Bello =

Nigerian canoeist (born 2002)

Personal information
- Full name: Ayomide Emmanuel Bello; Ayomide Powei Bello
- Born: 4 April 2002 (age 24) Epe, Lagos State, Nigeria
- Height: 145 cm (4 ft 9 in)
- Weight: 51 kg (112 lb)

Sport
- Country: Nigeria
- Sport: Canoe sprint, Canoe slalom
- Events: C-1 & C-2
Medal record
Women's canoe sprint
Representing Nigeria
African Games
Gold medal – first place	2019 Rabat	C-1 200 m
Gold medal – first place	2019 Rabat	C-1 500 m
Gold medal – first place	2019 Rabat	C-2 200 m
Gold medal – first place	2019 Rabat	C-2 500 m

Ayomide Emmanuel Bello (born 4 April 2002), also known as Ayomide Powei Bello, is a Nigerian canoeist. She competed in the women's C-1 200 metres event at the 2020 Summer Olympics held in Tokyo, Japan. She also represented Nigeria at the 2024 Summer Olympics in Paris, France. Bello was Nigeria's first female canoeist at the Olympics.

In 2018, she won two gold medals at the African Youth Games. In that same year, she represented Nigeria at the 2018 Summer Youth Olympics and competed in four events: the girls' C1 sprint, girls' C1 slalom, girls' K1 sprint and girls' K1 slalom. She did not win a medal in these events.

She competed at the 2019 African Games and won the gold medals in the C-1 200 metres and C-1 500 metres events. She also won the gold medals in the C-2 200 metres and C-2 500 metres events. As a result the country finished second in the canoeing medal table at the 2019 African Games and she also qualified for the 2020 Tokyo Olympics in the C-1 200 metres.

She also secured Olympic qualification at the Canoe Sprint African Paris 2024 qualifier in Nigeria. she teamed up with Beauty Akinaere Otuedo to finish last in Final B in the French and reached the quarter-final of the C1 200l.
