= Jessica Triebeľová =

Slovak boxer (born 2001)

Personal information
- Nationality: Slovak
- Born: 11 April 2001 (age 25) Klin, Slovakia
- Height: 171 cm (5 ft 7 in)
- Weight: 66 kg (146 lb)

Boxing career
- Weight class: Welterweight
- Stance: Orthodox
Medal record
Women's amateur boxing
Representing Slovakia
European Championships
Bronze medal – third place	2024 Belgrade	Welterweight

Jessica Triebeľová (born 11 April 2001) is a Slovak boxer. She competed at the 2024 Summer Olympics. Triebeľová is a European Championship medallist, having won bronze in the welterweight category in 2024.

== Early life ==
Jessica Triebeľová was born on 11 April 2001 in the village of Klin in the Námestovo District. She started boxing at the age of nine.

== Boxing career ==
=== Junior competition ===
In September 2016, Triebeľová won the -54 kg event at the European Championships for Seniors and Juniors in Ordu, Turkey, where she beat Russian boxer Valeria Rodionova. In July 2017, Triebeľová won the -57 kg event at the European Championships for Seniors and Juniors in Sofia, Bulgaria, beating Vilma Viitanen of Finland 4–1 on points in the final.

In February 2018, Triebeľová won the Golden Girl tournament in Sweden at the age of 16, becoming the youngest boxer to ever win the event. In April 2018, Triebeľová won 5–0 in the semi-finals before defeating Déarbhla Rooney of Ireland in the final to win the European Youth Boxing Championships in Italy, in the -57 kg category. It was her third gold medal at European level.

Triebeľová competed in the 2018 Summer Youth Olympics in Buenos Aires. However, after being eliminated in the first round, both Triebeľová herself and her father and coach Peter Triebeľ contemplated ending her career due to complaints about refereeing. Nonetheless, she decided to continue boxing.

=== Senior competition ===
At her first senior competition, the 2023 European Games in Poland, Triebeľová was eliminated in the second round, 4–1 on points, by Melissa Gemini of Italy. At the 2024 European Amateur Boxing Championships in Belgrade, Triebeľová won the bronze medal in the -66 kg category.

Triebeľová secured a spot at the 2024 Summer Olympics in Paris with a 3–2 victory over the French boxer Emilie Sonvico at the 2024 World Boxing Olympic Qualification Tournament 2 in Bangkok. She became the first woman to compete in boxing for Slovakia at the Olympics, and fourth boxer overall. During the Olympics, where she took part in the women's 66 kg event, Triebeľová was eliminated in the first round by Mozambican opponent Alcinda Panguana by a unanimous decision.
