= Emanuela Luknárová =

Slovak canoeist (born 2002)

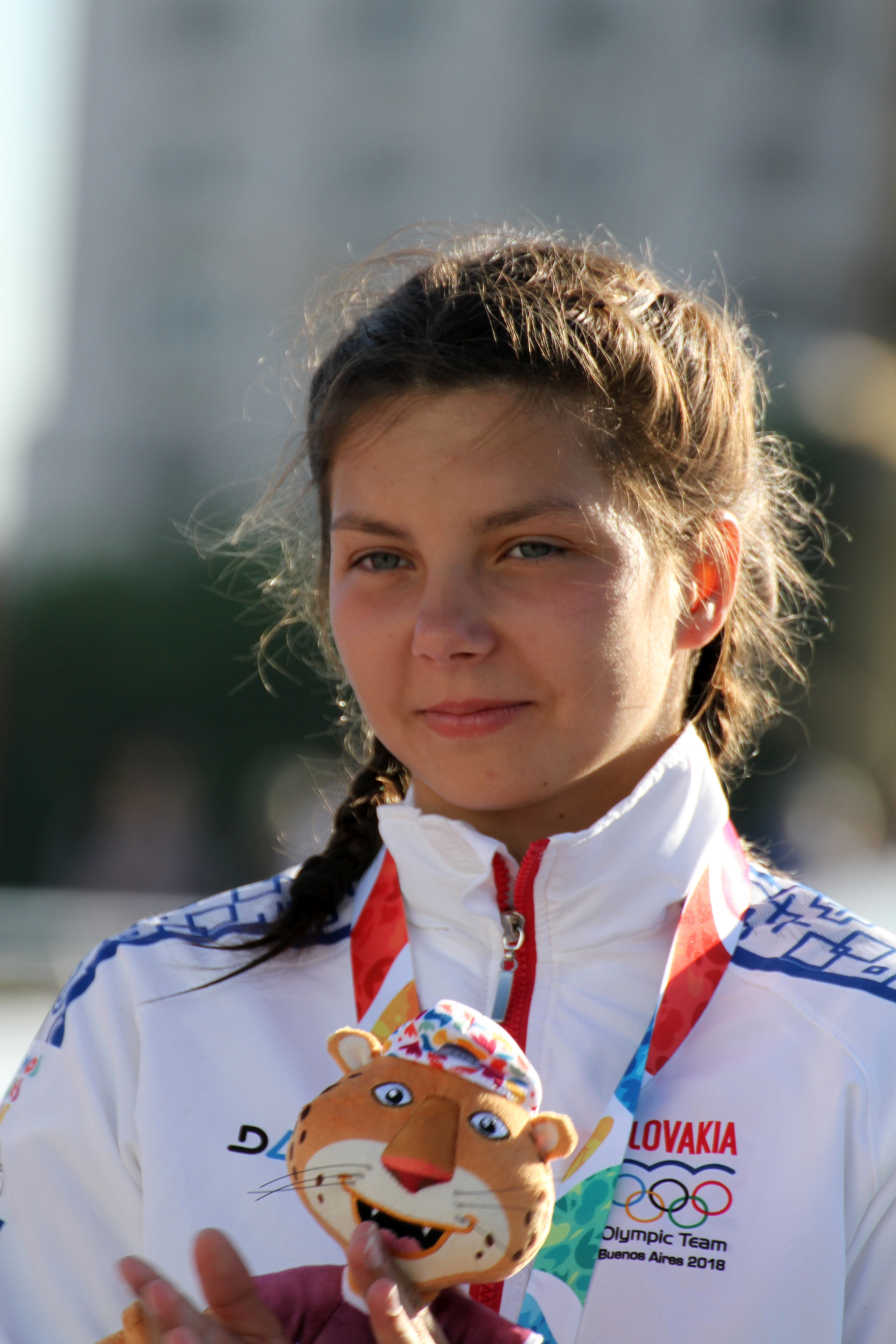

Personal information
- Nationality: Slovak
- Born: 7 March 2002 (age 24) Bratislava, Slovakia

Sport
- Country: Slovakia
- Sport: Canoe slalom
- Event: C1, K1, Kayak cross
Medal record
Women's canoe slalom
Representing Slovakia
World Championships
Gold medal – first place	2026 Oklahoma City	C1 team
European Championships
Gold medal – first place	2022 Liptovský Mikuláš	C1 team
Youth Olympic Games
Gold medal – first place	2018 Buenos Aires	K1
Bronze medal – third place	2018 Buenos Aires	C1
U23 World Championships
Silver medal – second place	2021 Tacen	C1
Bronze medal – third place	2021 Tacen	C1 team
Bronze medal – third place	2022 Ivrea	C1
U23 European Championships
Silver medal – second place	2023 Bratislava	C1 team
Bronze medal – third place	2024 Kraków	C1
Junior World Championships
Silver medal – second place	2019 Kraków	C1 team
Junior European Championships
Silver medal – second place	2018 Bratislava	C1 team
Bronze medal – third place	2019 Liptovský Mikuláš	C1 team

Emanuela Luknárová (born 7 March 2002) is a Slovak slalom canoeist who has competed at the international level since 2017. Luknárová competes in all canoe slalom disciplines (C1, K1 and kayak cross).

Luknárová won a gold medal in the C1 team event at the 2026 ICF Canoe Slalom World Championships in Oklahoma City.

She was also part of the gold medal winning C1 team at the 2022 European Canoe Slalom Championships in Liptovský Mikuláš.

She won two medals at the 2018 Summer Youth Olympics in Buenos Aires, a gold in the K1 event (even though she does not normally compete in kayak) and a bronze in the C1 event. The competition was not a true canoe slalom event as it was held on flat water.

== Major championships results timeline ==
Event		2019	2020	2021	2022	2023	2024	2025	2026
World Championships	C1	37	Not held	—	23	15	Not held	23	20
World Championships	K1	—	Not held	—	—	—	Not held	38	—
World Championships	Kayak cross individual	Not held						48	—
World Championships	C1 team	4	Not held	—	6	5	Not held	4	1
World Championships	K1 team	—	Not held	—	—	—	Not held	10	—
European Championships	C1	32	—	—	13	17 (Note: 2023 European Games)	30	16	13
European Championships	K1	—	—	—	—	—	—	34	—
European Championships	Kayak cross	Not held		—	—	—	—	30	—
European Championships	Kayak cross individual	Not held					—	28	—
European Championships	C1 team	6	—	—	1	6	6	6	4
European Championships	K1 team	—	—	—	—	—	—	9	—
