= Doriane Delassus =

French canoeist (born 2002)

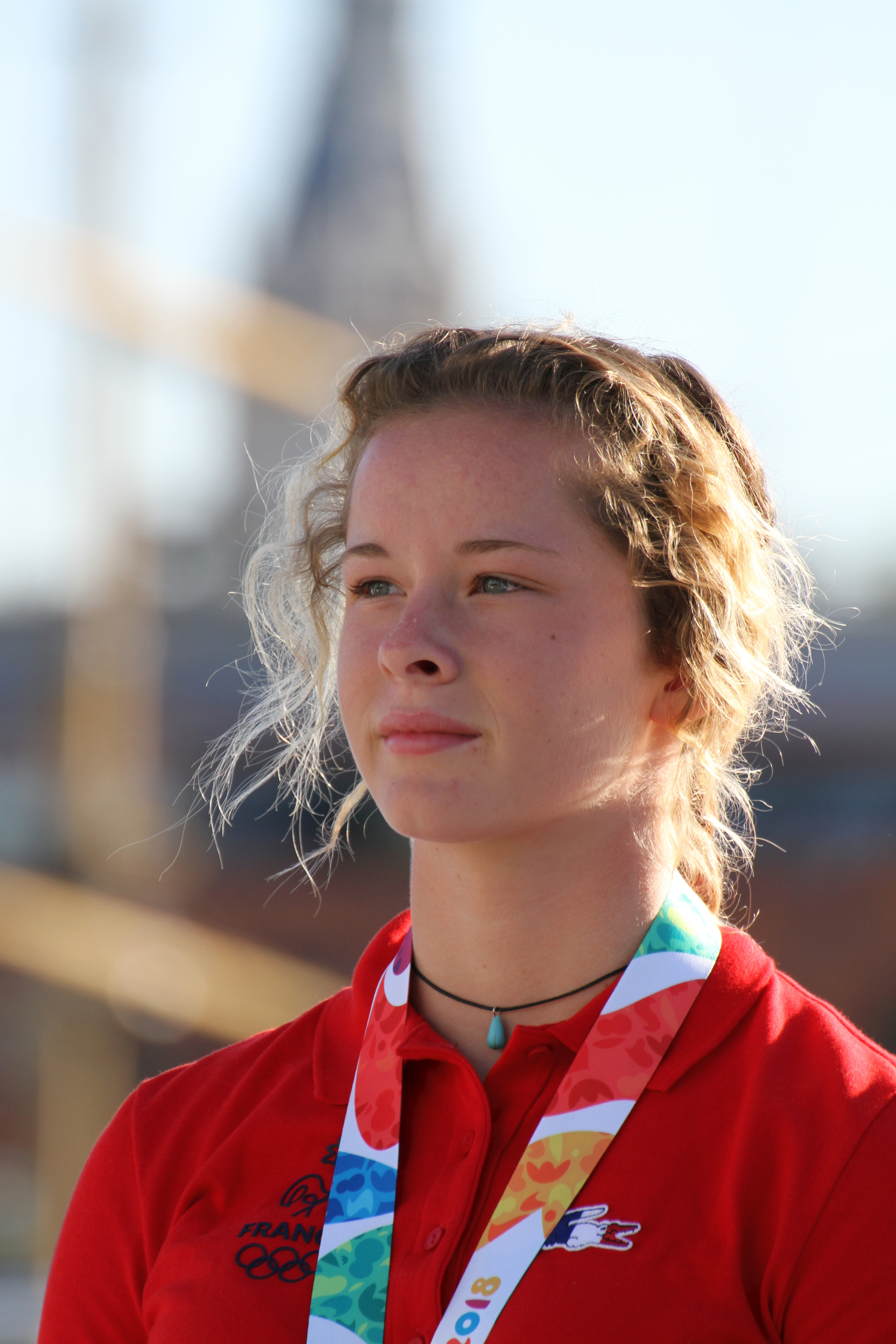
- Delassus at the 2018 Summer Youth Olympics

Personal information
- Nationality: French
- Born: 17 November 2002 (age 23) Pau, Pyrénées-Atlantiques, France

Sport
- Sport: Canoe slalom
- Event: C1, K1, Kayak cross
Medal record
Women's Canoe slalom
Representing France
Event	1st	2nd	3rd
World Championships	0	0	1
European Championships	0	3	1
Youth Olympic Games	1	1	0
U23 World Championships	1	3	1
U23 European Championships	3	1	4
Junior World Championships	1	1	1
Junior European Championships	0	3	0
Total	6	12	8
World Championships
Bronze medal – third place	2026 Oklahoma City	C1 team
European Championships
Silver medal – second place	2025 Vaires-sur-Marne	C1 team
Silver medal – second place	2026 Ivrea	C1
Silver medal – second place	2026 Ivrea	C1 team
Bronze medal – third place	2025 Vaires-sur-Marne	C1
Youth Olympic Games
Gold medal – first place	2018 Buenos Aires	C1
Silver medal – second place	2018 Buenos Aires	K1
U23 World Championships
Gold medal – first place	2025 Foix	Kayak cross
Silver medal – second place	2021 Tacen	C1 team
Silver medal – second place	2023 Kraków	C1 team
Silver medal – second place	2025 Foix	K1 team
Bronze medal – third place	2025 Foix	C1 team
U23 European Championships
Gold medal – first place	2023 Bratislava	Kayak cross
Gold medal – first place	2023 Bratislava	K1 team
Gold medal – first place	2024 Kraków	Kayak cross
Silver medal – second place	2024 Kraków	Kayak cross individual
Bronze medal – third place	2023 Bratislava	C1
Bronze medal – third place	2024 Kraków	C1 team
Bronze medal – third place	2025 Solkan	C1
Bronze medal – third place	2025 Solkan	C1 team
Junior World Championships
Gold medal – first place	2019 Kraków	K1 team
Silver medal – second place	2018 Ivrea	Mixed C2
Bronze medal – third place	2018 Ivrea	C1 team
Junior European Championships
Silver medal – second place	2019 Liptovský Mikuláš	K1 team
Silver medal – second place	2020 Kraków	C1
Silver medal – second place	2020 Kraków	C1 team

Doriane Delassus (born 17 November 2002) is a French slalom canoeist who has competed at the international level since 2018.

== Career ==
Delassus represented France at the 2018 Summer Youth Olympics winning a gold medal in the C1 event and a silver medal in the K1 event.

In May 2025, she made her senior national team debut at the 2025 European Canoe Slalom Championships and won a silver medal in the C1 team event, and a bronze medal in the C1 event. In July 2025, she competed at the 2025 U23 World Championships and won a gold medal in kayak cross, a silver medal in the K1 team, and bronze medal in the C1 team events.

She represented France at the 2026 ICF Canoe Slalom World Championships in Oklahoma City winning a bronze medal in the C1 team event, along with Angèle Hug and her sister, Marjorie Delassus.

=== World Cup individual podiums ===
Season	Date	Venue	Position	Event
2025	6 September 2025	Augsburg	3rd	C1

== Personal life ==
Her sister, Marjorie, and brother, Anatole are both also slalom canoeists.
