= Swimming at the 2018 Summer Youth Olympics – Girls' 100 metre freestyle =

Girls' 100 metre freestyle at the 2018 Summer Youth Olympics
- Venue: Natatorium
- Dates: 8 October (heats, semifinals); 9 October (final)
- Competitors: 45 from 41 nations
- Winning time: 54.19

Medalists
gold medal	Barbora Seemanová	Czech Republic
silver medal	Yang Junxuan	China
bronze medal	Neža Klančar	Slovenia

The girls' 100 metre freestyle event at the 2018 Summer Youth Olympics took place on 8 and 9 October at the Natatorium in Buenos Aires, Argentina.

== Results ==
=== Heats ===
The heats were started on 8 October at 10:12.

Rank	Heat	Lane	Name	Nationality	Time	Notes
1	5	4	Barbora Seemanová	Czech Republic	55.15	Q
2	5	5	Nagisa Ikemoto	Japan	55.51	Q
3	5	3	Neža Klančar	Slovenia	55.59	Q
4	4	5	Mayuka Yamamoto	Japan	55.95	Q
5	4	4	Elizaveta Klevanovich	Russia	55.99	Q
6	6	5	Abbey Webb	Australia	56.10	Q
7	6	3	Kyla Leibel	Canada	56.21	Q
8	6	1	Anastasia Gorbenko	Israel	56.33	Q
9	6	4	Yang Junxuan	China	56.50	Q
10	4	3	Ieva Maļuka	Latvia	56.64	Q
11	3	4	Anicka Delgado	Ecuador	56.75	Q
12	4	2	Kalia Antoniou	Cyprus	56.76	Q
13	5	2	Kate Douglass	United States	56.80	Q
13	6	6	Rafaela Raurich	Brazil	56.80	Q
15	3	2	Diana Petkova	Bulgaria	56.83	Q
16	5	7	Christie Chue	Singapore	56.92	Q
17	5	6	Julia Mrozinski	Germany	56.97	
18	5	1	Ana Vieira	Brazil	57.00	
19	3	6	Julieta Lema	Argentina	57.07	
20	3	1	Erika Fairweather	New Zealand	57.16	
21	4	7	Nea-Amanda Heinola	Finland	57.22	
21	6	7	Snæfríður Sól Jórunnardóttir	Iceland	57.22	
23	3	5	Leoni Richter	Switzerland	57.27	
23	6	2	Angelina Köhler	Germany	57.27	
25	6	8	Alena Semizhon	Belarus	57.31	
26	3	8	Nicole Oliva	Philippines	57.33	
27	4	6	Aleksa Gold	Estonia	57.42	
28	5	8	Kornelia Fiedkiewicz	Poland	57.63	
29	4	8	Tinky Ho	Hong Kong	58.02	
30	4	1	Andrea Santander	Venezuela	58.24	
31	2	4	Sara Junevik	Sweden	58.42	
32	2	6	Beatriz Padrón	Costa Rica	58.66	
33	3	3	Tamara Potocká	Slovakia	58.69	
34	2	3	Madelyn Moore	Bermuda	58.81	
35	2	7	Enjy Mohamed Abouzaid	Egypt	58.86	
36	2	8	Inés Marín	Chile	58.98	
37	2	1	Natalya Kritinina	Uzbekistan	59.72	
38	3	7	Karolina Jurczyk	Poland	59.78	
39	2	5	Emily MacDonald	Jamaica	59.98	
40	2	2	Maria Perez Garcia	Luxembourg	1:00.60	
41	1	5	Sonia Tumiotto	Tanzania	1:01.47	
42	1	4	Samantha Roberts	Antigua and Barbuda	1:01.91	
43	1	2	Aaliyah Palestrini	Seychelles	1:03.07	
44	1	3	Jadyn George	Guyana	1:04.10	
45	1	6	Robyn Young	Eswatini	1:06.53	

=== Semifinals ===
The semifinals were started on 8 October at 18:40.

Rank	Heat	Lane	Name	Nationality	Time	Notes
1	2	4	Barbora Seemanová	Czech Republic	54.61	Q
2	2	2	Yang Junxuan	China	54.79	Q
3	2	5	Neža Klančar	Slovenia	55.10	Q
4	1	4	Nagisa Ikemoto	Japan	55.25	Q
5	2	3	Elizaveta Klevanovich	Russia	55.34	Q
6	1	3	Abbey Webb	Australia	55.69	Q
7	2	6	Kyla Leibel	Canada	55.93	Q
8	1	6	Anastasia Gorbenko	Israel	56.21	Q
9	1	5	Mayuka Yamamoto	Japan	56.37	
10	1	7	Kalia Antoniou	Cyprus	56.63	
11	1	1	Rafaela Raurich	Brazil	56.64	
12	1	2	Ieva Maļuka	Latvia	56.65	
13	2	8	Diana Petkova	Bulgaria	56.82	
14	2	1	Kate Douglass	United States	57.15	
15	1	8	Christie Chue	Singapore	57.29	
16	2	7	Anicka Delgado	Ecuador	57.67	

=== Final ===
The final was held on 9 October at 19:25.

Rank	Lane	Name	Nationality	Time	Notes
1st place, gold medalist(s)	4	Barbora Seemanová	Czech Republic	54.19	NR
2nd place, silver medalist(s)	5	Yang Junxuan	China	54.43	
3rd place, bronze medalist(s)	3	Neža Klančar	Slovenia	54.55	NR
4	6	Nagisa Ikemoto	Japan	55.37	
5	7	Abbey Webb	Australia	55.61	
6	2	Elizaveta Klevanovich	Russia	55.68	
7	8	Anastasia Gorbenko	Israel	55.88	
8	1	Kyla Leibel	Canada	56.16	
