= Swimming at the 2018 Summer Youth Olympics – Girls' 50 metre freestyle =

Girls' 50 metre freestyle at the 2018 Summer Youth Olympics
- Venue: Natatorium
- Dates: 11 October (heats, semifinals); 12 October (final)
- Competitors: 54 from 51 nations
- Winning time: 25.14

Medalists
gold medal	Barbora Seemanová	Czech Republic
silver medal	Mayuka Yamamoto	Japan
bronze medal	Yang Junxuan	China
bronze medal	Neža Klančar	Slovenia

The girls' 50 metre freestyle event at the 2018 Summer Youth Olympics took place on 11 and 12 October at the Natatorium in Buenos Aires, Argentina.

== Results ==
=== Heats ===
The heats were started on 11 October at 10:33.

Rank	Heat	Lane	Name	Nationality	Time	Notes
1	7	4	Barbora Seemanová	Czech Republic	25.44	Q
2	6	1	Yang Junxuan	China	25.65	Q
2	7	5	Neža Klančar	Slovenia	25.65	Q
4	7	3	Kate Douglass	United States	25.71	Q
5	5	3	Mona McSharry	Ireland	25.76	Q
6	5	4	Mayuka Yamamoto	Japan	25.80	Q
7	7	2	Kalia Antoniou	Cyprus	25.86	Q
8	6	5	Elizaveta Klevanovich	Russia	25.99	Q
8	6	6	Abbey Webb	Australia	25.99	Q
10	6	2	Diana Petkova	Bulgaria	26.00	Q
11	5	6	Julieta Lema	Argentina	26.02	Q
12	5	2	Nea-Amanda Heinola	Finland	26.08	Q
13	6	4	Angelina Köhler	Germany	26.15	Q, WD
14	7	6	Kyla Leibel	Canada	26.19	Q
15	6	3	Kornelia Fiedkiewicz	Poland	26.21	Q
16	5	1	Elinah Phillip	British Virgin Islands	26.22	Q
17	7	1	Alena Semizhon	Belarus	26.32	Q
18	7	7	Nagisa Ikemoto	Japan	26.52	
19	7	8	Anicka Delgado	Ecuador	26.78	
20	6	7	Ieva Maļuka	Latvia	26.80	
21	5	7	Madelyn Moore	Bermuda	26.81	
22	4	8	Christie Chue	Singapore	26.83	
23	4	1	Tayde Sansores	Mexico	27.01	
24	5	5	Karolina Jurczyk	Poland	27.07	
25	4	7	Tamara Potocká	Slovakia	27.10	
26	4	2	Enjy Mohamed Abouzaid	Egypt	27.12	
27	5	8	Natalya Kritinina	Uzbekistan	27.13	
28	3	4	Inés Marín	Chile	27.16	
28	4	3	Sara Junevik	Sweden	27.16	
30	6	8	Arina Baikova	Latvia	27.22	
31	4	6	Snæfríður Sól Jórunnardóttir	Iceland	27.34	
32	4	5	Mariel Mencía	Dominican Republic	27.37	
33	4	4	Emily MacDonald	Jamaica	27.51	
34	3	3	Maria Perez Garcia	Luxembourg	27.57	
35	3	5	Samantha Roberts	Antigua and Barbuda	28.26	
36	3	6	Mia Phiri	Zambia	28.28	
37	3	1	Jadyn George	Guyana	29.15	
38	3	7	Melisa Zhdrella	Kosovo	29.41	
39	3	8	Ashley Chai	Brunei	29.52	
40	3	2	Lara Al Yafei	Oman	29.59	
41	2	4	Margie Winter	Federated States of Micronesia	29.80	
42	1	7	Anastasiya Tyurina	Tajikistan	29.92	
43	2	3	Ramatoulaye Kamara	Senegal	30.34	
44	2	5	Royline Akiwo	Palau	31.27	
45	1	4	Mera Abushammaleh	Palestine	31.78	
46	1	6	Nafissath Radji	Benin	31.93	
47	2	6	Tayamika Chang'anamuno	Malawi	32.12	
48	2	1	Sompathana Chamberlain	Laos	32.73	
49	2	7	Kayla Hepler	Marshall Islands	32.81	
50	2	2	Ria Adams	Saint Vincent and the Grenadines	33.26	
51	2	8	Chloe Sauvourel	Central African Republic	34.54	
52	1	2	Rita Ekomba	Equatorial Guinea	42.22	
53	1	3	Gniene Sessouma	Burkina Faso	42.29	
	1	5	Maria Abdallah Attoumani	Comoros	DSQ	

=== Semifinals ===
The semifinals were started on 11 October at 18:32.

Rank	Heat	Lane	Name	Nationality	Time	Notes
1	2	4	Barbora Seemanová	Czech Republic	25.33	Q
2	2	3	Mona McSharry	Ireland	25.42	Q
3	1	4	Yang Junxuan	China	25.43	Q
4	2	5	Neža Klančar	Slovenia	25.47	Q
5	1	2	Diana Petkova	Bulgaria	25.53	Q
6	1	5	Kate Douglass	United States	25.57	Q
7	1	3	Mayuka Yamamoto	Japan	25.62	Q
8	1	6	Elizaveta Klevanovich	Russia	25.74	Q
9	1	1	Kornelia Fiedkiewicz	Poland	25.76	
10	2	1	Kyla Leibel	Canada	25.77	
11	2	2	Abbey Webb	Australia	25.80	
12	2	6	Kalia Antoniou	Cyprus	25.95	
13	2	7	Julieta Lema	Argentina	25.99	
14	1	7	Nea-Amanda Heinola	Finland	26.49	
15	1	8	Alena Semizhon	Belarus	26.56	
15	2	8	Elinah Phillip	British Virgin Islands	26.56	

=== Final ===
The final was held on 12 October at 18:00.

Rank	Lane	Name	Nationality	Time	Notes
1st place, gold medalist(s)	4	Barbora Seemanová	Czech Republic	25.14	
2nd place, silver medalist(s)	1	Mayuka Yamamoto	Japan	25.39	
3rd place, bronze medalist(s)	3	Yang Junxuan	China	25.47	
3rd place, bronze medalist(s)	6	Neža Klančar	Slovenia	25.47	
5	5	Mona McSharry	Ireland	25.54	
6	2	Diana Petkova	Bulgaria	25.56	
7	7	Kate Douglass	United States	25.83	
8	8	Elizaveta Klevanovich	Russia	26.05	
