= Athletics at the 2018 Summer Youth Olympics – Girls' 200 metres =

Girls' 200 metres events at the Olympics

Girls' 200 metres at the III Summer Youth Olympic Games
- Venue: Parque Polideportivo Roca
- Date: 13 and 16 October 2018
- Competitors: 22 from 22 nations

Medalists
1st place, gold medalist(s)		Guðbjörg Jóna Bjarnadóttir	Iceland
2nd place, silver medalist(s)		Dalia Kaddari	Italy
3rd place, bronze medalist(s)		Letícia Lima	Brazil

The girls' 200 metres competition at the 2018 Summer Youth Olympics was held on 13 and 16 October, at the Parque Polideportivo Roca.

== Schedule ==
All times are in local time (UTC-3).

Date	Time	Round
Saturday, 13 October 2018	16:10	Stage 1
Tuesday, 16 October 2018	16:40	Stage 2

== Results ==
=== Stage 1 ===
Rank	Heat	Lane	Athlete	Nation	Result	Notes
1	2	4	Guðbjörg Jóna Bjarnadóttir	Iceland	23.55	QH3, PB
2	2	2	Letícia Lima	Brazil	24.16	QH3
3	1	8	Dalia Kaddari	Italy	24.24	QH3
4	2	5	Barbora Šplechtnová	Czech Republic	24.30	QH3
5	1	3	Pia Skrzyszowska	Poland	24.51	QH3
6	3	8	Gemima Joseph	France	24.56	QH3
7	3	4	Angie González	Colombia	24.65	QH3
8	3	2	Kenisha Phillips	Guyana	24.72	QH3
9	1	5	Esperança Cladera	Spain	24.88	QH2
10	1	2	Princess Roberts	Canada	24.92	QH2
11	1	6	Shalinda Jansen	Sri Lanka	25.00	QH2
12	2	3	Ivana Ilić	Serbia	25.15	QH2
13	2	7	Viktoria Forster	Slovakia	25.28	QH2
14	3	6	Chang Li-ling	Chinese Taipei	25.30	QH2
15	3	7	Ann Marii Kivikas	Estonia	25.43	QH2
16	1	4	Akouvi Judith Koumedzina	Togo	25.60	QH2
17	2	8	Eva Kadyrova	Kyrgyzstan	25.95	QH1
18	1	7	Judelande Altidor	Haiti	26.36	QH1
19	3	5	Tia George	Dominica	26.65	QH1
20	2	6	Josee Mireille Dedewanou Houeto	Benin	27.42	QH1, =PB
21	1	1	Lujahla Amatya	Nepal	27.95	QH1, PB
22	3	3	Tessy Macdalena Bristol	Seychelles	28.27	QH1

=== Stage 2 ===
Rank	Heat	Lane	Athlete	Nation	Result	Notes
1	3	5	Dalia Kaddari	Italy	23.45	PB
2	3	3	Guðbjörg Jóna Bjarnadóttir	Iceland	23.47	PB
3	3	4	Letícia Lima	Brazil	23.71	PB
4	3	7	Gemima Joseph	France	23.77	
5	3	6	Barbora Šplechtnová	Czech Republic	23.82	PB
6	3	8	Pia Skrzyszowska	Poland	23.95	PB
7	3	2	Angie González	Colombia	24.05	
8	2	5	Shalinda Jansen	Sri Lanka	24.07	PB
9	2	6	Esperança Cladera	Spain	24.28	
10	3	1	Kenisha Phillips	Guyana	24.29	
11	2	3	Princess Roberts	Canada	24.37	
12	2	8	Chang Li-ling	Chinese Taipei	24.44	PB
13	2	2	Ann Marii Kivikas	Estonia	24.53	PB
14	2	7	Viktoria Forster	Slovakia	24.56	PB
15	2	4	Ivana Ilić	Serbia	24.63	PB
16	2	1	Akouvi Judith Koumedzina	Togo	24.96	PB
17	1	5	Tia George	Dominica	25.46	PB
18	1	4	Eva Kadyrova	Kyrgyzstan	25.75	
19	1	6	Judelande Altidor	Haiti	25.77	
20	1	3	Josee Mireille Dedewanou Houeto	Benin	26.88	PB
21	1	7	Lujahla Amatya	Nepal	27.20	PB
22	1	8	Tessy Macdalena Bristol	Seychelles	27.38	

=== Final placing ===
Rank	Athlete	Nation	Stage 1	Stage 2	Total
1st place, gold medalist(s)	Guðbjörg Jóna Bjarnadóttir	Iceland	23.55	23.47	47.02
2nd place, silver medalist(s)	Dalia Kaddari	Italy	24.24	23.45	47.69
3rd place, bronze medalist(s)	Letícia Lima	Brazil	24.16	23.71	47.87
4	Barbora Šplechtnová	Czech Republic	24.30	23.82	48.12
5	Gemima Joseph	France	24.56	23.77	48.33
6	Pia Skrzyszowska	Poland	24.51	23.95	48.46
7	Angie González	Colombia	24.65	24.05	48.70
8	Kenisha Phillips	Guyana	24.72	24.29	49.01
9	Shalinda Jansen	Sri Lanka	25.00	24.07	49.07
10	Esperança Cladera	Spain	24.88	24.28	49.16
11	Princess Roberts	Canada	24.92	24.37	49.29
12	Chang Li-ling	Chinese Taipei	25.30	24.44	49.74
13	Ivana Ilić	Serbia	25.15	24.63	49.78
14	Viktoria Forster	Slovakia	25.28	24.56	49.84
15	Ann Marii Kivikas	Estonia	25.43	24.53	49.96
16	Akouvi Judith Koumedzina	Togo	25.60	24.96	50.56
17	Eva Kadyrova	Kyrgyzstan	25.95	25.75	51.70
18	Tia George	Dominica	26.65	25.46	52.11
19	Judelande Altidor	Haiti	26.36	25.77	52.13
20	Josee Mireille Dedewanou Houeto	Benin	27.42	26.88	54.30
21	Lujahla Amatya	Nepal	27.95	27.20	55.15
22	Tessy Macdalena Bristol	Seychelles	28.27	27.38	55.65
