= Swimming at the 2018 Summer Youth Olympics – Boys' 50 metre breaststroke =

Boys' 50 metre breaststroke at the 2018 Summer Youth Olympics
- Venue: Natatorium
- Dates: 11 October (heats, semifinals); 12 October (final)
- Competitors: 35 from 32 nations
- Winning time: 27.51

Medalists
gold medal	Michael Houlie	South Africa
silver medal	Sun Jiajun	China
bronze medal	Alexander Milanovich	Canada

The boys' 50 metre breaststroke event at the 2018 Summer Youth Olympics took place on 11 and 12 October at the Natatorium in Buenos Aires, Argentina.

== Results ==
=== Heats ===
The heats were started on 11 October at 11:16.

Rank	Heat	Lane	Name	Nationality	Time	Notes
1	5	4	Sun Jiajun	China	27.91	Q
2	4	5	Michael Houlie	South Africa	27.99	Q
3	3	4	Taku Taniguchi	Japan	28.28	Q
4	5	2	Denis Petrashov	Kyrgyzstan	28.43	Q
5	5	5	Alexander Milanovich	Canada	28.46	Q
6	3	2	Santiago Saint-Upery	Uruguay	28.47	Q
7	3	3	André Klippenberg Grindheim	Norway	28.55	Q
8	4	3	Juri Dijkstra	Netherlands	28.79	Q
9	4	6	Caspar Corbeau	Netherlands	28.90	Q
10	4	1	Andrés Puente	Mexico	28.95	Q
11	5	3	Didzis Rudavs	Latvia	28.98	Q
12	4	2	Izaak Bastian	Bahamas	29.01	Q
13	4	4	Vladislav Gerasimenko	Russia	29.03	Q
14	5	1	Samy Ahmed Boutouil	Morocco	29.12	Q
15	3	5	Vitor de Souza	Brazil	29.16	Q
16	5	6	Yu Hanaguruma	Japan	29.18	Q
17	5	7	Aleksey Sidorchuk	Uzbekistan	29.24	
18	2	3	Demirkan Demir	Turkey	29.25	
19	2	4	Moncef Aymen Balamane	Algeria	29.30	
20	3	6	Jan Kałusowski	Poland	29.40	
21	3	1	Ethan Dang	United States	29.50	
22	4	7	Sebestyén Böhm	Hungary	29.57	
23	3	7	Ahmed Yassine Fliyou	Morocco	29.59	
24	4	8	Dávid Gajdoš	Slovakia	29.64	
25	1	6	Samuele Rossi	Seychelles	29.66	
26	2	5	Amro Al-Wir	Jordan	29.71	
27	3	8	Maximillian Ang	Singapore	30.09	
28	2	6	Marcus Mok	Hong Kong	30.37	
29	2	2	Simon Greuter	Liechtenstein	31.13	
30	2	7	Leonard Kalate	Papua New Guinea	31.45	
30	5	8	Luis Weekes	Barbados	31.45	
32	2	1	Daniel Scott	Guyana	33.28	
33	1	4	Omar Barry	Burkina Faso	41.81	
34	1	3	Andrés Akue	Equatorial Guinea	44.81	
	2	8	Momodou Saine	The Gambia	DSQ	
	1	5	Eddie Boyengue	Republic of the Congo	DNS	

=== Semifinals ===
The semifinals were started on 11 October at 18:58.

Rank	Heat	Lane	Name	Nationality	Time	Notes
1	1	4	Michael Houlie	South Africa	27.33	Q
2	2	4	Sun Jiajun	China	28.05	Q
3	2	3	Alexander Milanovich	Canada	28.19	Q
4	2	5	Taku Taniguchi	Japan	28.22	Q
5	2	1	Vladislav Gerasimenko	Russia	28.43	Q
6	2	2	Caspar Corbeau	Netherlands	28.44	Q
7	2	8	Vitor de Souza	Brazil	28.53	Q
8	1	5	Denis Petrashov	Kyrgyzstan	28.62	Q
9	1	3	Santiago Saint-Upery	Uruguay	28.76	
10	1	6	Juri Dijkstra	Netherlands	28.77	
11	2	7	Didzis Rudavs	Latvia	28.89	
12	2	6	André Klippenberg Grindheim	Norway	28.93	
13	1	2	Andrés Puente	Mexico	28.97	
14	1	8	Yu Hanaguruma	Japan	29.01	
15	1	1	Samy Ahmed Boutouil	Morocco	29.10	
16	1	7	Izaak Bastian	Bahamas	29.35	

=== Final ===
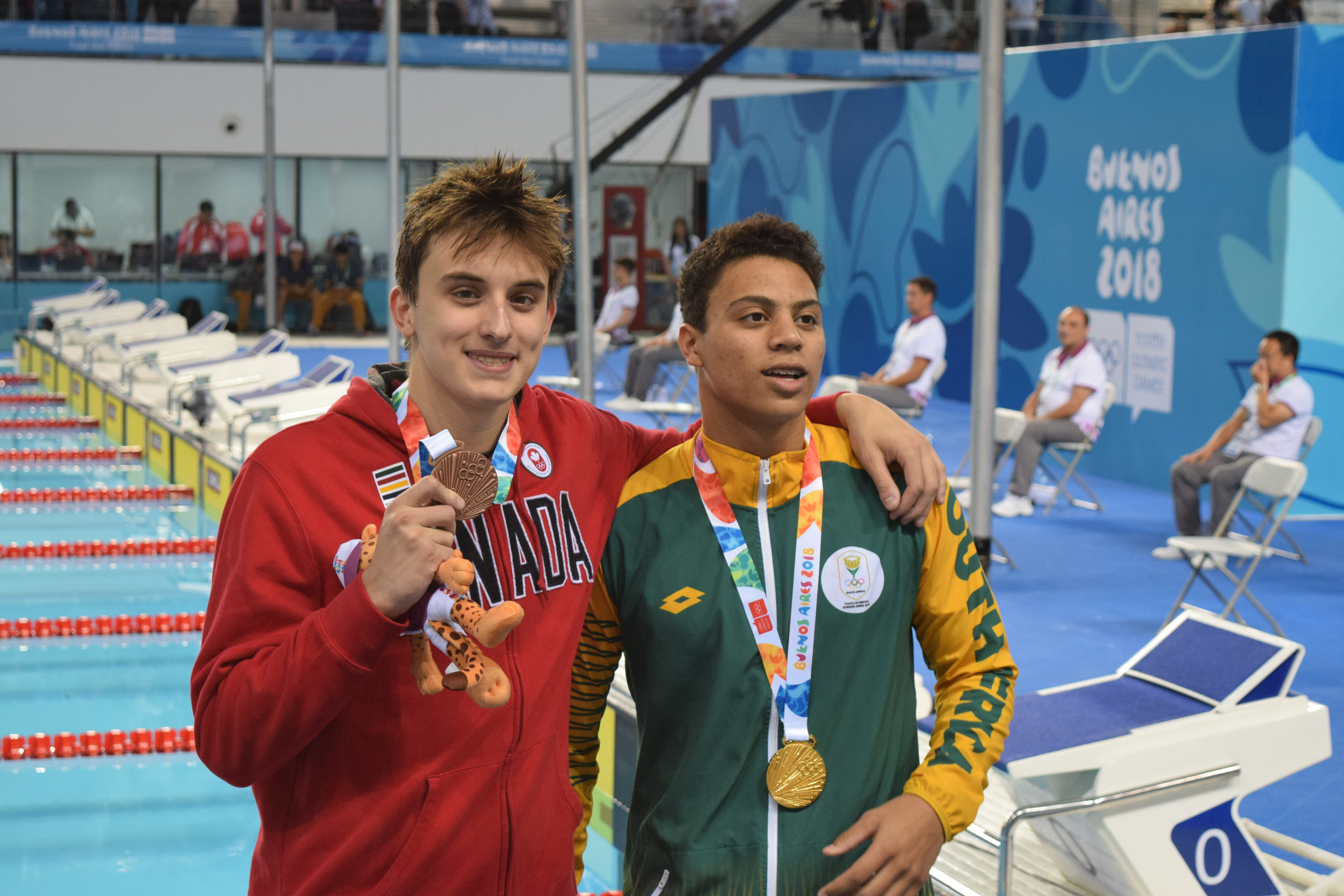
Michael Houlie, South Africa, and Alexander Milanovich, Canada, present their gold respective bronze medal

The final was held on 12 October at 19:29.

Rank	Lane	Name	Nationality	Time	Notes
1st place, gold medalist(s)	4	Michael Houlie	South Africa	27.51	
2nd place, silver medalist(s)	5	Sun Jiajun	China	27.85	
3rd place, bronze medalist(s)	3	Alexander Milanovich	Canada	27.87	
4	6	Taku Taniguchi	Japan	28.20	
5	1	Vitor de Souza	Brazil	28.24	
6	2	Vladislav Gerasimenko	Russia	28.36	
7	7	Caspar Corbeau	Netherlands	28.70	
7	8	Denis Petrashov	Kyrgyzstan	28.70	
