= Estonia at the 2018 Summer Youth Olympics =

- IOC code: EST
- NOC: Estonian Olympic Committee
- Website: www.eok.ee

in Buenos Aires
- Competitors: 23 in 8 sports
- Flag bearer (opening): Eerik Haamer
- Flag bearer (closing): Greta Jaanson
- Medals Ranked 83rd: Gold 0 Silver 0 Bronze 1 Total 1

Summer Youth Olympics appearances (overview)
- 2010; 2014; 2018

Estonia competed at the 2018 Summer Youth Olympics, in Buenos Aires, Argentina from 6 October to 18 October 2018.

A total of 23 competitors competed for Estonia, the highest number of athletes Estonia had so far sent to the Youth Olympic Games. All competitors qualified without needing an invitation. Estonia made its debut in four sports: archery, gymnastics, karate (new sport) and wrestling.

== Medalists ==
Medals awarded to participants of mixed-NOC teams are represented in italics. These medals are not counted towards the individual NOC medal tally.

Medal	Name	Sport	Event	Date
Silver	Adelina Beljajeva	Gymnastics	Mixed multi-discipline team	10 October
Bronze	Greta Jaanson	Rowing	Girls' single sculls	10 October

== Competitors ==
The following is the list of number of competitors that participated at the Games per sport.

Sport	Boys	Girls	Total
Archery	1	0	1
Athletics	2	4	6
Basketball	4	4	8
Gymnastics	0	1	1
Karate	0	1	1
Rowing	0	1	1
Swimming	2	2	4
Wrestling	0	1	1
Total	9	14	23

== Archery ==
Estonia qualified one athlete for the boys event based on its performance at the 2017 World Archery Youth Championships.

Individual

Athlete	Event	Ranking round		Round of 32	Round of 16	Quarterfinals	Semifinals	Final / BM	Rank
Athlete	Event	Score	Seed	Opposition Score	Opposition Score	Opposition Score	Opposition Score	Opposition Score	Rank
Hendrik Õun	Boys' individual	671	10th	Shabani (IRI); L 2–6	Did not advance				17th

Team

Athletes	Event	Ranking round		Round of 32	Round of 16	Quarterfinals	Semifinals	Final / BM	Rank
Athletes	Event	Score	Seed	Opposition Score	Opposition Score	Opposition Score	Opposition Score	Opposition Score	Rank
Nicole Marie Tagle (PHI); Hendrik Õun (EST)	Mixed team	1300	13th	Bassi (CHI); Dalpatadu (SRI); W 5–4	Tromans-Ansell (GBR); Shabani (IRI); W 5–3	Jones (NZL); Tang (TPE); L 1–5	Did not advance		6th

== Athletics ==
Estonia qualified six athletes based on their performance at the 2018 European Athletics U18 Championships.

Boys
Track & road events

Athlete	Event	Stage 1		Stage 2		Total	
Athlete	Event	Time	Rank	Time	Rank	Total	Rank
Ken-Mark Minkovski	200 m	21.69	7th	21.70	18th	43.39	14th

Field events

Athlete	Event	Stage 1		Stage 2		Total	
Athlete	Event	Result	Rank	Result	Rank	Total	Rank
Eerik Haamer	Pole vault	5.15 NYR	2nd	5.12	4th	10.27	4th

Girls
Track & road events

Athlete	Event	Stage 1		Stage 2		Total	
Athlete	Event	Time	Rank	Time	Rank	Total	Rank
Ann Marii Kivikas	200 m	25.43	15th	24.53	13th	49.96	15th

Field Events

Athlete	Event	Stage 1		Stage 2		Total	
Athlete	Event	Result	Rank	Result	Rank	Total	Rank
Gedly Tugi	Javelin throw	52.65	6th	52.60	7th	105.25	6th
Annika Emily Kelly	Hammer throw	63.41 NYR	9th	60.07	7th	123.48	7th
Marleen Mülla	Pole vault	3.85	3rd	3.82	4th	7.67	4th

== Basketball ==
Estonia qualified both boys and girls team based on the FIBA U18 3x3 National Federation Ranking.

Boys' tournament

- Kerr Kriisa
- Aleksander Oliver Hint
- Arthur Herman Entsik
- Jaan Erik Lepp

Event	Group stage					Quarterfinal	Semifinal	Final / BM	
Event	Opposition Score	Opposition Score	Opposition Score	Opposition Score	Rank	Opposition Score	Opposition Score	Opposition Score	Rank
Boys' tournament	Mongolia; W 22–13	Argentina; L 19–22	United States; W 21–14	Russia; L 21–22	3rd	Did not advance			9th

Girls' tournament

- Victoria-Ida Vähi (injured)
- Johanna Eliise Teder
- Janne Pulk
- Martha Liisa Oinits

Event	Group stage					Quarterfinal	Semifinal	Final / BM	
Event	Opposition Score	Opposition Score	Opposition Score	Opposition Score	Rank	Opposition Score	Opposition Score	Opposition Score	Rank
Girls' tournament	Netherlands; L 12–22	Spain; L 11–21	Czech Republic; W 17–15	Australia; L 15–19	4th	Did not advance			14th

Girls' shoot-out contest

Athlete	Event	Qualification		Final	
Athlete	Event	Points	Rank	Points	Rank
Janne Pulk	Shoot-out contest	4	13th	Did not advance	
Johanna Eliise Teder	Shoot-out contest	2	31st	Did not advance	

== Gymnastics ==
=== Rhythmic gymnastics ===
Estonia qualified one rhythmic gymnast based on its performance at the European Qualification Event.

Girls

Athlete	Event	Qualification						Final					
Athlete	Event	Hoop	Ball	Clubs	Ribbon	Total	Rank	Hoop	Ball	Clubs	Ribbon	Total	Rank
Adelina Beljajeva	Individual	14.050	14.250	13.975	12.000	54.275	18th	Did not advance					

=== Mixed multidiscipline team ===
Team	Athlete	Acrobatic	Artistic	Rhythmic	Trampoline	Total points	Rank
Team Max Whitlock	Madalena Cavilhas (POR); Manuel Candeias (POR)	20	—N/a			349	2nd place, silver medalist(s)
Team Max Whitlock	Fernando Espíndola (ARG)	—N/a	43	—N/a		349	2nd place, silver medalist(s)
Team Max Whitlock	Takeru Kitazono (JPN)	—N/a	17	—N/a		349	2nd place, silver medalist(s)
Team Max Whitlock	Pablo Calvache (ECU)	—N/a	59	—N/a		349	2nd place, silver medalist(s)
Team Max Whitlock	Camila Montoya (CRC)	—N/a	69	—N/a		349	2nd place, silver medalist(s)
Team Max Whitlock	Ksenia Klimenko (RUS)	—N/a	11	—N/a		349	2nd place, silver medalist(s)
Team Max Whitlock	Zeina Ibrahim (EGY)	—N/a	15	—N/a		349	2nd place, silver medalist(s)
Team Max Whitlock	Rayna Khai Ling Hoh (MAS)	—N/a		18	—N/a	349	2nd place, silver medalist(s)
Team Max Whitlock	Roza Abitova (KAZ)	—N/a		26	—N/a	349	2nd place, silver medalist(s)
Team Max Whitlock	Adelina Beljajeva (EST)	—N/a		47	—N/a	349	2nd place, silver medalist(s)
Team Max Whitlock	Robert Vilarasau (ESP)	—N/a			11	349	2nd place, silver medalist(s)
Team Max Whitlock	Jessica Clarke (GBR)	—N/a			13	349	2nd place, silver medalist(s)

== Karate ==
Estonia qualified one athlete based on the rankings in the Buenos Aires 2018 Olympic Standings.

Athlete	Event	Group phase				Semifinal	Final / BM	
Athlete	Event	Opposition Score	Opposition Score	Opposition Score	Rank	Opposition Score	Opposition Score	Rank
Marta Ossipova	Girls' 59 kg	Sakaji (JPN); L 0–2	Perovic (SRB); L 0–2	Barnyi (HUN); L 0–2	4th	Did not advance		7th

== Rowing ==
Estonia qualified one rower based on its performance at the 2018 European Rowing Junior Championships.

Athlete	Event	Heats					Quarterfinals		Semifinals		Final	
Athlete	Event	Round 2		Round 3		Points	Quarterfinals		Semifinals		Final	
Athlete	Event	Time	Rank	Time	Rank	Points	Time	Rank	Time	Rank	Time	Rank
Greta Jaanson	Girls' single sculls	1:56.88	3rd	1:53.34	1st	9 Q	1:46.83	1st Q	1:46.13	2nd Q	1:46.13	3rd place, bronze medalist(s)

== Swimming ==
Estonia qualified four athletes.

Boys

Athlete	Event	Heat		Semifinal		Final	
Athlete	Event	Time	Rank	Time	Rank	Time	Rank
Alex Ahtiainen	50 m butterfly	25.66	36th	Did not advance			
Alex Ahtiainen	100 m butterfly	55.05	23rd	Did not advance			
Ivan Štšeglov	100 m backstroke	57.57	18th R	Did not advance			
Ivan Štšeglov	200 m backstroke	2:01.69 NR	6th Q	—N/a		2:02.63	8th

Girls

Athlete	Event	Heat		Semifinal		Final	
Athlete	Event	Time	Rank	Time	Rank	Time	Rank
Aleksa Gold	100 m freestyle	57.42	27th	Did not advance			
Aleksa Gold	200 m freestyle	2:04.27	20th	—N/a		Did not advance	
Aleksa Gold	200 m backstroke	2:17.14	14th	—N/a		Did not advance	
Margaret Markvardt	50 m backstroke	30.14	22nd	Did not advance			
Margaret Markvardt	200 m medley	2:22.89	27th	—N/a		Did not advance	

== Wrestling ==
Estonia qualified one athlete based on its performance at the 2018 European Cadet Championships.

Key:

- VT – Victory by Fall.
- PP – Decision by Points – the loser with technical points.
- PO – Decision by Points – the loser without technical points.

Girls

Athlete	Event	Group stage					Final / RM	Rank
Athlete	Event	Opposition Score	Opposition Score	Opposition Score	Opposition Score	Rank	Opposition Score	Rank
Viktoria Vesso	Freestyle −65kg	Sghaier (TUN); W 5–0 ^{VT}	Balogun (NGR); L 0–3 ^{PO}	Nabaina (CMR); W 5–0 ^{VT}	Sghaier (UKR); L 1–3 ^{PP}	3rd	Capezan (ROU); W 5–0 ^{VT}	5th
