= Athletics at the 2018 Summer Youth Olympics – Boys' 200 metres =

Boys' 200 metres at the III Summer Youth Olympic Games
- Venue: Parque Polideportivo Roca
- Date: 13 October and 16 October 2018
- Competitors: 23 from 23 nations

Medalists
| 1st place, gold medalist(s) | | Abdelaziz Mohamed; Qatar |
| 2nd place, silver medalist(s) | | Antonio Watson; Jamaica |
| 3rd place, bronze medalist(s) | | Lucas Vilar; Brazil |

The boys' 200 metres competition at the 2018 Summer Youth Olympics was held on 13 and 16 October, at the Parque Polideportivo Roca.

== Schedule ==
All times are in local time (UTC-3).

| Date | Time | Round |
|---|---|---|
| Saturday, 13 October 2018 | 15:40 | Stage 1 |
| Tuesday, 16 October 2018 | 16:05 | Stage 2 |

== Results ==
=== Stage 1 ===
| Rank | Heat | Lane | Athlete | Nation | Result | Notes |
|---|---|---|---|---|---|---|
| 1 | 3 | 7 | Abdelaziz Mohamed | Qatar | 21.10 | QH3, PB |
| 2 | 2 | 6 | Antonio Watson | Jamaica | 21.33 | QH3 |
| 3 | 1 | 7 | Ali Anwar Ali Al Balushi | Oman | 21.63 | QH3, PB |
| 4 | 1 | 6 | Tazana Kamanga | Denmark | 21.68 | QH3 |
| 4 | 1 | 5 | Lucas Vilar | Brazil | 21.68 | QH3 |
| 4 | 2 | 4 | Alexander Czysch | Germany | 21.68 | QH3 |
| 7 | 2 | 8 | Ken-Mark Minkovsky | Estonia | 21.69 | QH3 |
| 7 | 3 | 5 | Sulayman Touray | The Gambia | 21.69 | QH3 |
| 9 | 3 | 6 | Aurélien Larue | France | 21.73 | QH2 |
| 10 | 2 | 2 | Dominic Overend | New Zealand | 21.75 | QH2 |
| 11 | 2 | 7 | Joakim Genereux | Canada | 21.84 | QH2 |
| 12 | 1 | 1 | Lin Yu-sian | Chinese Taipei | 21.85 | QH2 |
| 13 | 2 | 3 | Bence Farkas | Hungary | 21.90 | QH2 |
| 14 | 1 | 2 | Oliver Murcko | Slovakia | 21.91 | QH2 |
| 15 | 3 | 1 | Adam Łukomski | Poland | 21.97 | QH2 |
| 16 | 2 | 5 | Timothé Mumenthaler | Switzerland | 21.98 | QH2 |
| 17 | 3 | 3 | Mitja Kordež | Slovenia | 22.00 | QH1 |
| 17 | 3 | 4 | Vesselin Jivkov | Bulgaria | 22.00 | QH1 |
| 19 | 1 | 3 | Nisar Ahmad | India | 22.08 | QH1, SB |
| 20 | 3 | 2 | Jacob El Aida Chaffey | Malta | 22.31 | QH1 |
| 21 | 3 | 8 | Benjamin Ombenga | Central African Republic | 22.51 | QH1, PB |
| 22 | 1 | 8 | Sebastian Canchila | Colombia | 22.59 | QH1 |
| | 1 | 4 | Mohamed Mouigni Dahalane | Comoros | DNF | QH1 |

=== Stage 2 ===
| Rank | Heat | Lane | Athlete | Nation | Result | Notes |
|---|---|---|---|---|---|---|
| 1 | 3 | 3 | Abdelaziz Mohamed | Qatar | 20.68 | PB |
| 2 | 3 | 8 | Lucas Vilar | Brazil | 20.99 | PB |
| 3 | 3 | 5 | Antonio Watson | Jamaica | 21.08 | |
| 4 | 3 | 6 | Tazana Kamanga | Denmark | 21.15 | |
| 5 | 2 | 7 | Oliver Murcko | Slovakia | 21.19 | PB |
| 6 | 2 | 8 | Bence Farkas | Hungary | 21.25 | PB |
| 7 | 3 | 2 | Sulayman Touray | The Gambia | 21.29 | |
| 8 | 3 | 4 | Ali Anwar Ali Al Balushi | Oman | 21.36 | PB |
| 9 | 2 | 4 | Lin Yu-sian | Chinese Taipei | 21.37 | PB |
| 10 | 3 | 7 | Alexander Czysch | Germany | 21.42 | |
| 11 | 2 | 3 | Dominic Overend | New Zealand | 21.44 | PB |
| 12 | 2 | 5 | Joakim Genereux | Canada | 21.44 | PB |
| 13 | 2 | 6 | Aurélien Larue | France | 21.45 | PB |
| 14 | 2 | 2 | Adam Łukomski | Poland | 21.46 | PB |
| 15 | 1 | 3 | Vesselin Jivkov | Bulgaria | 21.47 | |
| 16 | 2 | 1 | Timothé Mumenthaler | Switzerland | 21.62 | PB |
| 17 | 1 | 4 | Mitja Kordež | Slovenia | 21.68 | SB |
| 18 | 3 | 1 | Ken-Mark Minkovski | Estonia | 21.70 | |
| 19 | 1 | 6 | Nisar Ahmad | India | 21.72 | PB |
| 20 | 1 | 8 | Benjamin Ombenga | Central African Republic | 21.79 | PB |
| 21 | 1 | 5 | Jacob El Aida Chaffey | Malta | 21.80 | PB |
| 22 | 1 | 7 | Sebastian Canchila | Colombia | 21.89 | |
| | 1 | 2 | Mohamed Mouigni Dahalane | Comoros | DNS | |

=== Final placing ===
| Rank | Athlete | Nation | Stage 1 | Stage 2 | Total |
|---|---|---|---|---|---|
| 1st place, gold medalist(s) | Abdelaziz Mohamed | Qatar | 21.10 | 20.68 | 41.78 |
| 2nd place, silver medalist(s) | Antonio Watson | Jamaica | 21.33 | 21.08 | 42.41 |
| 3rd place, bronze medalist(s) | Lucas Conceicao Vilar | Brazil | 21.68 | 20.99 | 42.67 |
| 4 | Tazana Kamanga | Denmark | 21.68 | 21.15 | 42.83 |
| 5 | Sulayman Touray | The Gambia | 21.69 | 21.29 | 42.98 |
| 6 | Ali Anwar Ali Al Balushi | Oman | 21.63 | 21.36 | 42.99 |
| 7 | Oliver Murcko | Slovakia | 21.91 | 21.19 | 43.10 |
| 8 | Alexander Czysch | Germany | 21.68 | 21.42 | 43.10 |
| 9 | Bence Farkas | Hungary | 21.90 | 21.25 | 43.15 |
| 10 | Aurélien Larue | France | 21.73 | 21.45 | 43.18 |
| 11 | Dominic Overend | New Zealand | 21.75 | 21.44 | 43.19 |
| 12 | Lin Yu-sian | Chinese Taipei | 21.85 | 21.37 | 43.22 |
| 13 | Joakim Genereux | Canada | 21.84 | 21.44 | 43.28 |
| 14 | Ken-Mark Minkovski | Estonia | 21.69 | 21.70 | 43.39 |
| 15 | Adam Łukomski | Poland | 21.97 | 21.46 | 43.43 |
| 16 | Vesselin Jivkov | Bulgaria | 22.00 | 21.47 | 43.47 |
| 17 | Timothé Mumenthaler | Switzerland | 21.98 | 21.62 | 43.60 |
| 18 | Mitja Kordež | Slovenia | 22.00 | 21.68 | 43.68 |
| 19 | Nisar Ahmad | India | 22.08 | 21.72 | 43.80 |
| 20 | Jacob El Aida Chaffey | Malta | 22.31 | 21.80 | 44.11 |
| 21 | Benjamin Ombenga | Central African Republic | 22.51 | 21.79 | 44.30 |
| 22 | Sebastian Canchila | Colombia | 22.59 | 21.89 | 44.48 |
| | Mohamed Mouigni Dahalane | Comoros | DNS | DNF | |
