= Swimming at the 2018 Summer Youth Olympics – Boys' 200 metre backstroke =

Boys' 200 metre backstroke at the 2018 Summer Youth Olympics
- Venue: Natatorium
- Dates: 12 October
- Competitors: 24 from 22 nations
- Winning time: 1:56.14

Medalists
gold medal	Kliment Kolesnikov	Russia
silver medal	Daniel Cristian Martin	Romania
bronze medal	Manuel Martos	Spain

The boys' 200 metre backstroke event at the 2018 Summer Youth Olympics took place on 12 October at the Natatorium in Buenos Aires, Argentina.

== Results ==
=== Heats ===
The heats were started at 10:00.

Rank	Heat	Lane	Name	Nationality	Time	Notes
1	3	4	Kliment Kolesnikov	Russia	1:59.86	Q
2	2	4	Daniel Cristian Martin	Romania	2:00.15	Q
3	1	5	Manuel Martos	Spain	2:00.21	Q
4	3	5	Ethan Harder	United States	2:01.07	Q
5	2	7	Chuang Mu-lun	Chinese Taipei	2:01.60	Q
6	2	6	Ivan Štšeglov	Estonia	2:01.69	Q
7	1	3	Arijus Pavlidi	Lithuania	2:02.11	Q
8	1	2	Anthony Rincón	Colombia	2:02.16	Q
9	1	4	Gábor Zombori	Hungary	2:03.04	
10	1	7	Juan Méndez	Argentina	2:03.08	
11	2	3	Stuart Swinburn	Australia	2:03.95	
12	3	3	Wang Guanbin	China	2:04.18	
13	1	6	Srihari Nataraj	India	2:04.80	
14	3	6	Abdellah Ardjoune	Algeria	2:04.91	
15	3	2	Farrel Armandio Tangkas	Indonesia	2:05.06	
16	2	5	Sebastian Somerset	Canada	2:05.47	
17	2	2	Lewis Blackburn	Australia	2:05.70	
18	3	7	Alanas Tautkus	Lithuania	2:06.00	
19	2	1	Jakub Lahoda	Czech Republic	2:07.36	
20	1	1	Hendrik Duvenhage	South Africa	2:07.76	
21	2	8	Roni Kallström	Finland	2:07.80	
22	3	8	Marvin Miglbauer	Austria	2:10.99	
23	3	1	Marcus Mok	Hong Kong	2:11.14	
24	1	8	Brynjólfur Óli Karlsson	Iceland	2:11.33	

=== Final ===
The final was held at 18:05.

Rank	Lane	Name	Nationality	Time	Notes
1st place, gold medalist(s)	4	Kliment Kolesnikov	Russia	1:56.14	
2nd place, silver medalist(s)	5	Daniel Cristian Martin	Romania	1:58.20	
3rd place, bronze medalist(s)	3	Manuel Martos	Spain	1:59.37	
4	6	Ethan Harder	United States	1:59.79	
5	2	Chuang Mu-lun	Chinese Taipei	2:01.64	
6	1	Arijus Pavlidi	Lithuania	2:02.32	
7	8	Anthony Rincón	Colombia	2:02.48	
8	7	Ivan Štšeglov	Estonia	2:02.63	
