= Antigua and Barbuda at the 2018 Summer Youth Olympics =

- IOC code: ANT
- NOC: The Antigua and Barbuda Olympic Association
- Website: http://antiguaolympiccommittee.com/

in Buenos Aires, Argentina 6 – 18 October 2018
- Competitors: 5
- Medals: Gold 0 Silver 0 Bronze 0 Total 0

Summer Youth Olympics appearances
- 2010; 2014; 2018

Antigua and Barbuda participated at the 2018 Summer Youth Olympics in Buenos Aires, Argentina from 6 October to 18 October 2018.

== Athletics ==
Girls

Track

Athlete	Event	Stage 1	Stage 2	Final Placing
Soniya Jones	Women's 100m	12.48	12.14	19

Field

Athlete	Event	Stage 1	Stage 2	Final Placing
Dahlia Barnes	Women's Long Jump	4.97	5.28	13

== Sailing ==
Antigua and Barbuda qualified one boat based on its performance at the North American and Caribbean IKA Twin Tip Qualifiers.

- Boys' IKA Twin Tip Racing - 1 boat

== Swimming ==
Boys

Athlete	Event	Heat		Semifinal		Final	
Athlete	Event	Time	Rank	Time	Rank	Time	Rank
Lleyton Martin	50 m backstroke	25.93	41	did not advance			
Lleyton Martin	100 m backstroke	59.32	42	did not advance			

Girls

Athlete	Event	Heat		Semifinal		Final	
Athlete	Event	Time	Rank	Time	Rank	Time	Rank
Samantha Roberts	50 m freestyle	28.26	35	did not advance			
Samantha Roberts	100 m freestyle	1:01.91	42	did not advance			
