= Athletics at the 2018 Summer Youth Olympics – Girls' 100 metres =

Girls' 100 metres at the III Summer Youth Olympic Games
- Venue: Parque Polideportivo Roca
- Date: 12 October and 15 October 2018
- Competitors: 42 from 42 nations

Medalists
1st place, gold medalist(s)		Rosemary Chukuma	Nigeria
2nd place, silver medalist(s)		Julien Alfred	Saint Lucia
3rd place, bronze medalist(s)		Anahí Suárez	Ecuador

The girls' 100 metres competition at the 2018 Summer Youth Olympics was held on 12 and 15 October, at the Parque Polideportivo Roca.

== Schedule ==
All times are in local time (UTC-3).

Date	Time	Round
12 October 2018	16:30	Stage 1
15 October 2018	16:05	Stage 2

== Results ==
=== Stage 1 ===
Rank	Heat	Lane	Athlete	Nation	Result	Notes
1	4	4	Anahí Suárez	Ecuador	11.97	QH5
2	5	8	Julien Alfred	Saint Lucia	11.99	QH5
3	3	8	Rosemary Chukuma	Nigeria	12.03	QH5
4	4	7	Boglárka Takács	Hungary	12.08	QH5
5	2	5	Mariam Sire Oularé	Belgium	12.09	QH5
6	1	2	Pamera Losange	France	12.13	QH5
7	2	3	Takako Niisaka	Japan	12.22	QH5
8	1	7	Mélissa Gutschmidt	Switzerland	12.27	QH5
9	3	4	Vitoria Pereira Jardim	Brazil	12.28	QH4
10	1	9	Beauty Somuah	Germany	12.32	QH4
11	5	2	Shary Vallecilla	Colombia	12.34	QH4
12	4	5	Johanna Kylmanen	Finland	12.34	QH4
13	2	6	Orangy Jiménez	Venezuela	12.41	QH4
14	1	8	Tereza Marková	Czech Republic	12.44	QH4
15	3	2	Beatriz Andrade	Portugal	12.46	QH4
16	5	5	Soniya Jones	Antigua and Barbuda	12.48	QH4
17	2	8	Anaís Hernández	Chile	12.48	QH4
18	3	6	Fakhriyya Taghizade	Azerbaijan	12.50	QH3
19	3	9	Alejandra Paulina Ortiz Hernández	Mexico	12.52	QH3
20	4	6	Donna Ntambue	Canada	12.58	QH3
21	5	7	Laura Pintiel	Spain	12.61	QH3
22	1	5	Maty Diop	Senegal	12.69	QH3
23	5	4	Lenka Kovačovičová	Slovakia	12.70	QH3
24	2	1	Adriana Almeida	Cape Verde	12.89	QH3
25	2	7	Charlotte Afriat	Monaco	13.00	QH3
26	4	2	Nora Ķigure	Latvia	13.14	QH3
27	5	6	Danneika Lyn	Cayman Islands	13.15	QH2
28	3	5	Edzinadia Ceita	São Tomé and Príncipe	13.45	QH2
29	3	7	Marwa Alajooz	Bahrain	13.60	QH2, PB
30	2	2	Érica Mouwangui	Equatorial Guinea	13.76	QH2, PB
31	3	3	Jarencia Jeffers	Saint Kitts and Nevis	13.83	QH2
32	2	4	Famata Darame	Guinea-Bissau	14.02	QH2
33	1	1	Melanie Ribauw	Nauru	14.05	QH2
34	1	4	Princess Dunah	Liberia	14.37	QH2
35	4	8	Youssouf Said Moina Rouzouna	Comoros	14.58	QH1
36	4	3	Raghad Habib Bu Arish	Saudi Arabia	14.68	QH1
37	3	1	Kanisleen Peter Michael	Federated States of Micronesia	14.71	QH1
38	4	1	Jein Kiden Clement Morgan	South Sudan	14.84	QH1
39	5	3	Darina McDermott	Kiribati	14.87	QH1
40	5	1	Nazi Yari	Afghanistan	17.43	QH1
41	1	6	Aminetou Fall	Mauritania	18.02	QH1
42	1	3	Nuha Ahmed Ali Al-Ahdal	Yemen	18.37	QH1

=== Stage 2 ===
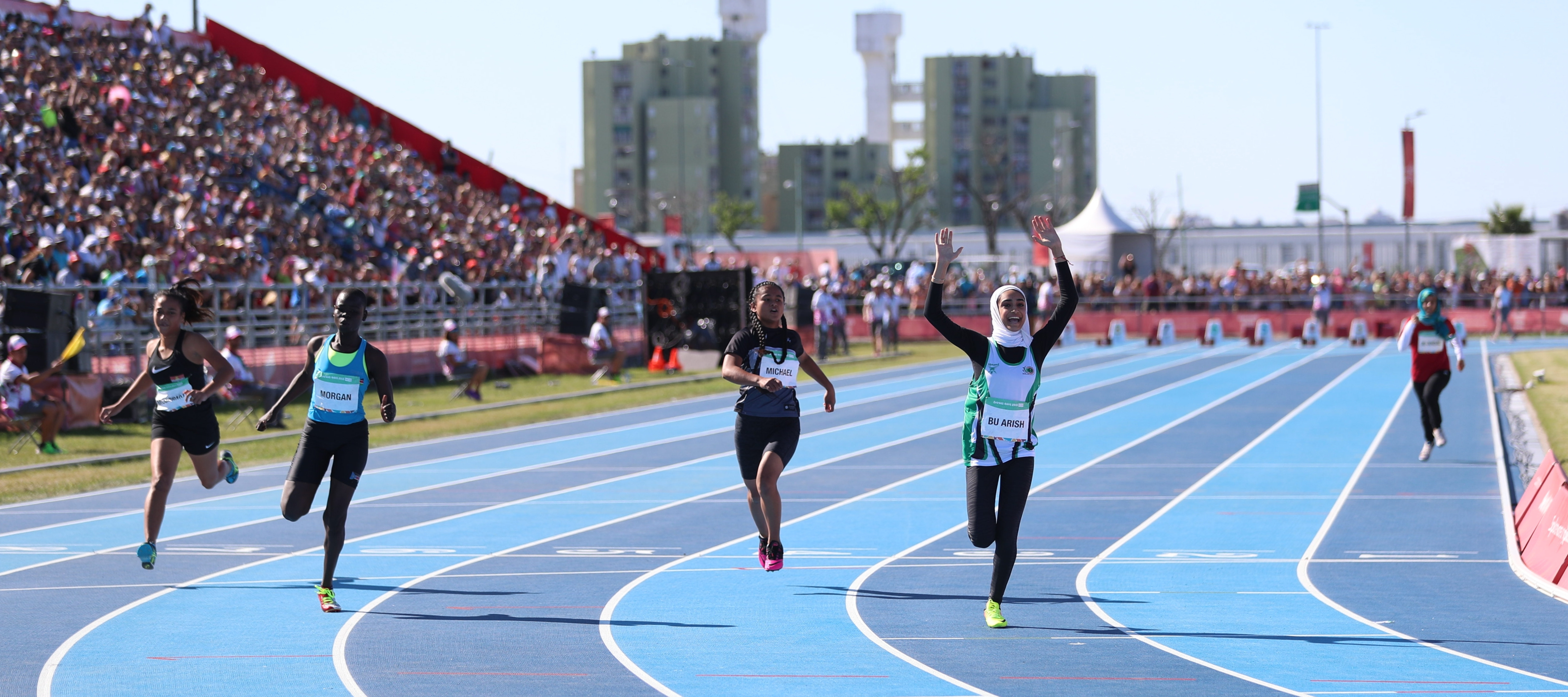
Heat 1

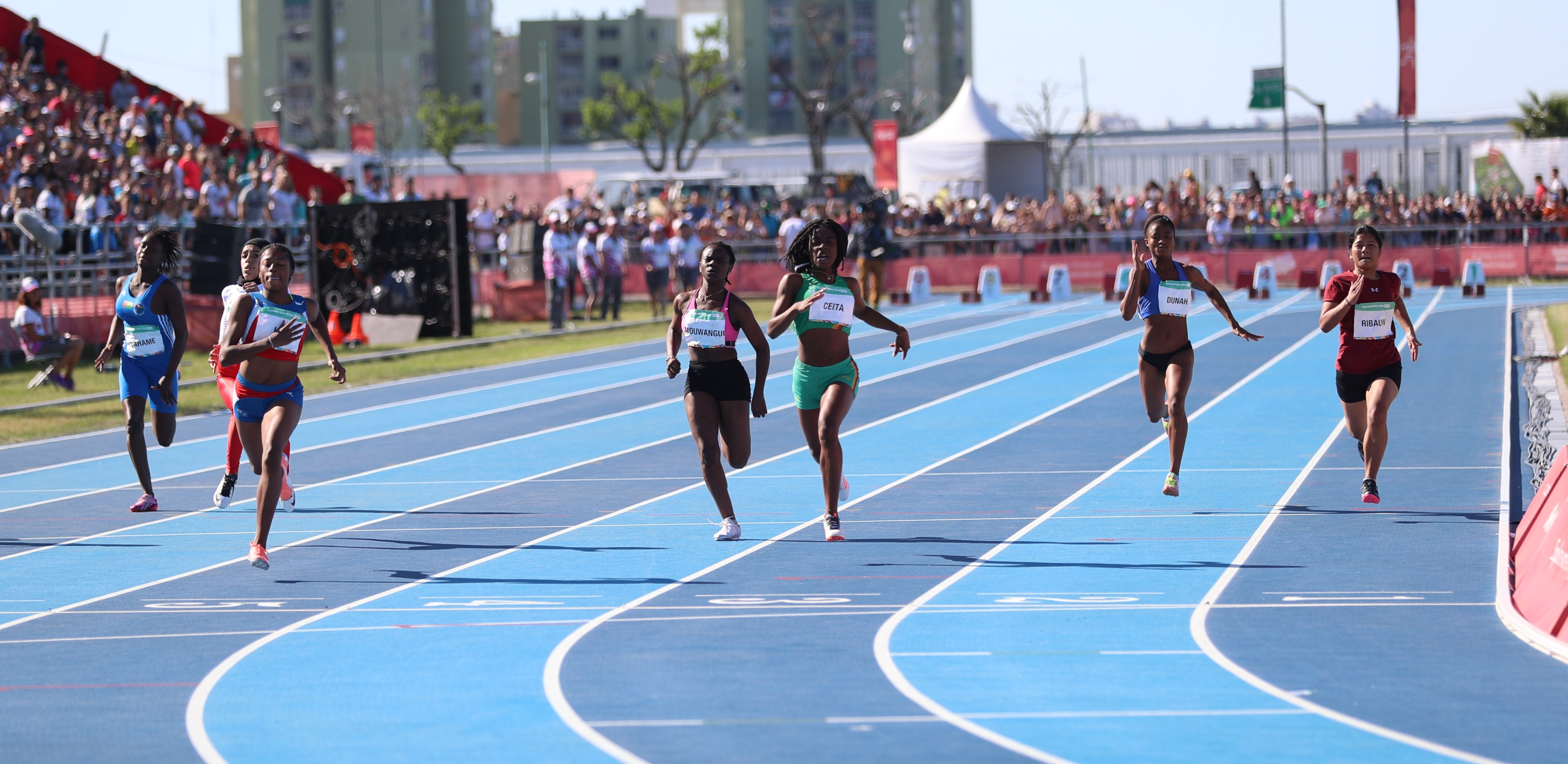
Heat 2

Rank	Heat	Lane	Athlete	Nation	Result	Notes
1	5	5	Rosemary Chukuma	Nigeria	11.17	
2	5	4	Julien Alfred	Saint Lucia	11.23	
3	5	6	Anahí Suárez	Ecuador	11.29	
4	5	3	Boglárka Takács	Hungary	11.45	
5	5	8	Pamera Losange	France	11.52	
6	5	7	Mariam Sire Oularé	Belgium	11.57	
7	5	1	Mélissa Gutschmidt	Switzerland	11.58	
8	5	2	Takako Niisaka	Japan	11.65	
9	4	5	Beauty Somuah	Germany	11.74	
10	3	5	Alejandra Paulina Ortiz Hernández	Mexico	11.82	
11	4	6	Vitoria Pereira Jardim	Brazil	11.86	
12	4	7	Johanna Kylmanen	Finland	11.91	
13	4	4	Shary Vallecilla	Colombia	11.91	
14	4	9	Orangy Jiménez	Venezuela	11.91	
15	4	3	Beatriz Andrade	Portugal	12.06	
16	4	1	Anaís Hernández	Chile	12.06	
17	3	7	Fakhriyya Taghizade	Azerbaijan	12.08	
18	3	4	Donna Ntambue	Canada	12.10	
19	3	6	Laura Pintiel	Spain	12.12	
20	4	8	Tereza Marková	Czech Republic	12.13	
21	4	2	Soniya Jones	Antigua and Barbuda	12.14	
22	3	9	Lenka Kovačovičová	Slovakia	12.18	
23	3	8	Maty Diop	Senegal	12.25	
24	3	1	Charlotte Afriat	Monaco	12.44	
25	3	3	Nora Ķigure	Latvia	12.46	
26	2	5	Danneika Lyn	Cayman Islands	12.71	
27	2	3	Edzinadia Ceita	São Tomé and Príncipe	12.85	
28	2	6	Marwa Alajooz	Bahrain	13.18	
29	2	4	Érica Mouwangui	Equatorial Guinea	13.21	
30	2	8	Jarencia Jeffers	Saint Kitts and Nevis	13.29	
31	2	1	Melanie Ribauw	Nauru	13.47	
32	2	2	Princess Dunah	Liberia	13.67	
33	1	3	Raghad Habib Bu Arish	Saudi Arabia	13.69	SB
34	2	7	Famata Darame	Guinea-Bissau	13.81	
35	1	6	Jein Kiden Clement Morgan	South Sudan	13.84	
36	1	4	Kanisleen Peter Michael	Federated States of Micronesia	14.09	
37	1	7	Darina McDermott	Kiribati	14.19	SB
38	1	1	Nuha Ahmed Ali Al-Ahdal	Yemen	17.56	SB
	3	2	Adriana Almeida	Cape Verde	DQ	R 162.8
	1	2	Aminetou Fall	Mauritania	DNS	
	1	5	Youssouf Said Moina Rouzouna	Comoros	DNS	
	1	8	Nazi Yari	Afghanistan	DNS	

=== Final placing ===
Rank	Athlete	Nation	Stage 1	Stage 2	Total
1st place, gold medalist(s)	Rosemary Chukuma	Nigeria	12.03	11.17	23.20
2nd place, silver medalist(s)	Julien Alfred	Saint Lucia	11.99	11.23	23.22
3rd place, bronze medalist(s)	Anahí Suárez	Ecuador	11.97	11.29	23.26
4	Boglárka Takács	Hungary	12.08	11.45	23.53
5	Pamera Losange	France	12.13	11.52	23.65
6	Mariam Sire Oularé	Belgium	12.09	11.57	23.66
7	Mélissa Gutschmidt	Switzerland	12.27	11.58	23.85
8	Takako Niisaka	Japan	12.22	11.65	23.87
9	Beauty Somuah	Germany	12.32	11.74	24.06
10	Vitoria Pereira Jardim	Brazil	12.28	11.86	24.14
11	Johanna Kylmanen	Finland	12.34	11.91	24.25
11	Shary Vallecilla	Colombia	12.34	11.91	24.25
13	Orangy Jiménez	Venezuela	12.41	11.91	24.32
14	Alejandra Paulina Ortiz Hernández	Mexico	12.52	11.82	24.34
15	Beatriz Andrade	Portugal	12.46	12.06	24.52
16	Anaís Hernández	Chile	12.48	12.06	24.54
17	Tereza Marková	Czech Republic	12.44	12.13	24.57
18	Fakhriyya Taghizade	Azerbaijan	12.50	12.08	24.58
19	Soniya Jones	Antigua and Barbuda	12.48	12.14	24.62
20	Donna Ntambue	Canada	12.58	12.10	24.68
21	Laura Pintiel	Spain	12.61	12.12	24.73
22	Lenka Kovačovičová	Slovakia	12.70	12.18	24.88
23	Maty Diop	Senegal	12.69	12.25	24.94
24	Charlotte Afriat	Monaco	13.00	12.44	25.44
25	Nora Ķigure	Latvia	13.14	12.46	25.60
26	Danneika Lyn	Cayman Islands	13.15	12.71	25.86
27	Edzinadia Ceita	São Tomé and Príncipe	13.45	12.85	26.30
28	Marwa Alajooz	Bahrain	13.60	13.18	26.78
29	Érica Mouwangui	Equatorial Guinea	13.76	13.21	26.97
30	Jarencia Jeffers	Saint Kitts and Nevis	13.83	13.29	27.12
31	Melanie Ribauw	Nauru	14.05	13.47	27.52
32	Famata Darame	Guinea-Bissau	14.02	13.81	27.83
33	Princess Dunah	Liberia	14.37	13.67	28.04
34	Raghad Habib Bu Arish	Saudi Arabia	14.68	13.69	28.37
35	Jein Kiden Clement Morgan	South Sudan	14.84	13.84	28.68
36	Kanisleen Peter Michael	Federated States of Micronesia	14.71	14.09	28.80
37	Darina McDermott	Kiribati	14.87	14.19	29.06
38	Nuha Ahmed Ali Al-Ahdal	Yemen	18.37	17.56	35.93
	Adriana Almeida	Cape Verde	12.89	DQ	
	Youssouf Said Moina Rouzouna	Comoros	14.58	DNS	
	Nazi Yari	Afghanistan	17.43	DNS	
	Aminetou Fall	Mauritania	18.02	DNS	
