= Daniel Martin (swimmer) =

Romanian swimmer (born 2000)

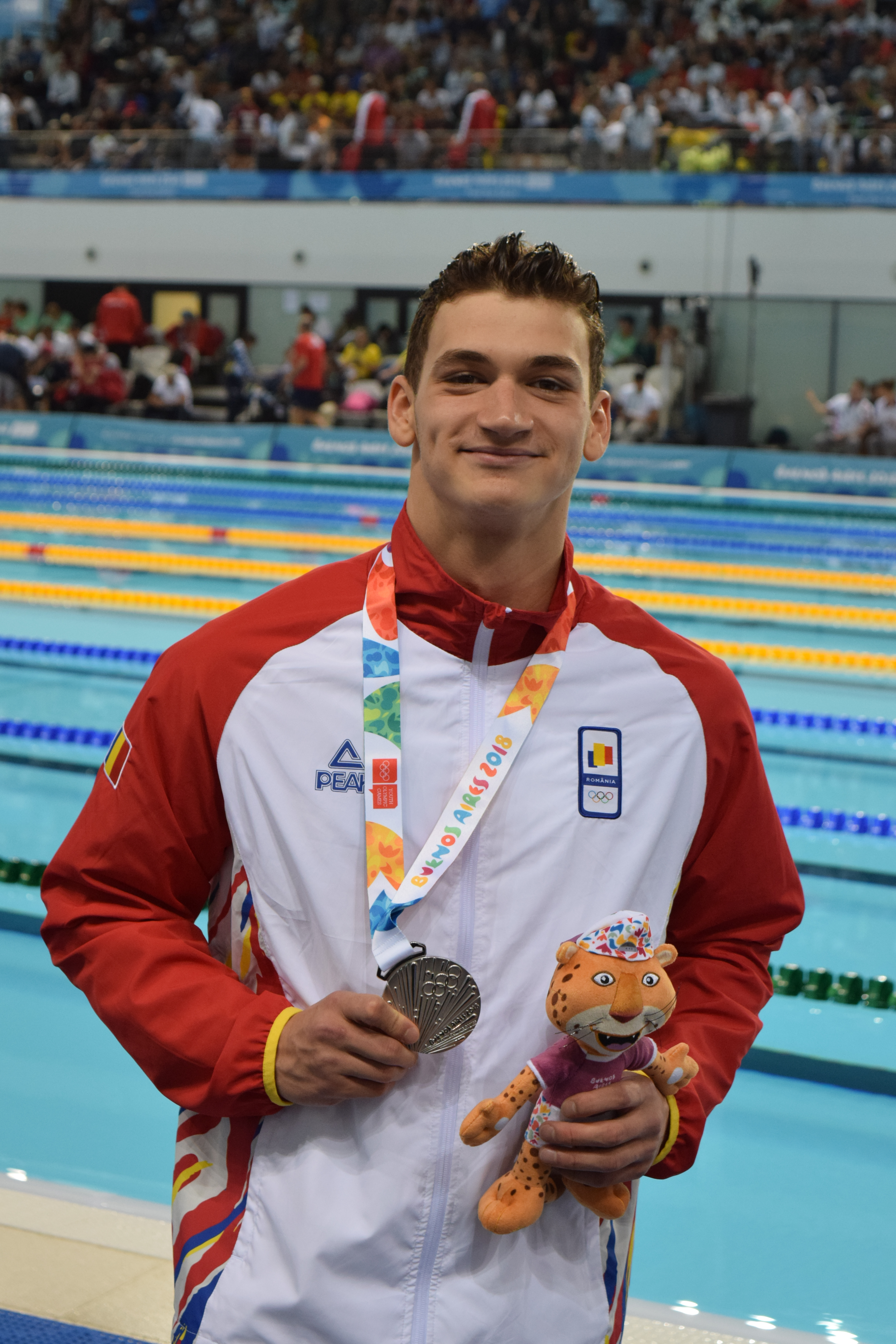

Personal information
- Full name: Daniel Cristian Martin
- National team: Romania
- Born: 5 October 2000 (age 26) Bucharest
- Height: 1.81 m (5 ft 11 in)
- Weight: 79 kg (174 lb)

Sport
- Sport: Swimming
- Strokes: Backstroke
- Club: SCM Bacău
- Coach: Iulian Matei
Medal record
Men's swimming
Representing Romania
Youth Olympic Games
Silver medal – second place	2018 Buenos Aires	100 m backstroke
Silver medal – second place	2018 Buenos Aires	200 m backstroke
World Championships (junior)
Bronze medal – third place	2017 Indianapolis	100 m backstroke
European Championships (junior)
Gold medal – first place	2018 Helsinki	100 m backstroke
Silver medal – second place	2018 Helsinki	200 m backstroke
Silver medal – second place	2017 Netanya	200 m backstroke
European Youth Olympic Festival
Bronze medal – third place	2015 Tbilisi	200 m backstroke

Daniel Cristian Martin (born 5 October 2000) is a Romanian competitive swimmer who specialized in backstroke events. He collected a total of seven medals in a junior international tournament, spanning the Youth Olympic Games, the World Championships, the European Championships, and the European Youth Olympic Festival. Additionally, Martin posted his own personal best of 53.52 to force a two-way tie for a golden finish and a meet record with Russia's Kliment Kolesnikov at the 2018 European Junior Swimming Championships in Helsinki, Finland. Martin currently trains as a member of the aquatics squad at the municipal sports club in his native Bacău, under the tutelage of his personal coach Iulian Matei.

Martin launched into the global scene as a junior swimmer at the 2018 Summer Youth Olympics in Buenos Aires, Argentina. There, he flipped with an early lead at the initial length of the men's 100 m backstroke final, before fading to a runner-up finish in 53.59, more than three tenths of a second behind Kolesnikov. Four days later, Martin continued to stage his rivalry with Kolesnikov for gold in the men's 200 m backstroke final, but could not catch him near the wall to finish again with a silver in his personal best of 1:58.20.
