= Athletics at the 2018 Summer Youth Olympics – Girls' long jump =

Girls' long jump at the III Summer Youth Olympic Games
- Venue: Parque Polideportivo Roca
- Date: 11, 14 October
- Competitors: 14 from 14 nations

Medalists
1st place, gold medalist(s)		Maité Beernaert	Belgium
2nd place, silver medalist(s)		Klaudia Endrész	Hungary
3rd place, bronze medalist(s)		Ingeborg Grünwald	Austria

The girls' long jump competition at the 2018 Summer Youth Olympics was held on 11 and 14 October, at the Parque Polideportivo Roca.

== Schedule ==
All times are in local time (UTC-3).

Date	Time	Round
Thursday, 11 October 2018	15:25	Stage 1
Sunday, 14 October 2018	14:05	Stage 2

== Results ==
=== Stage 1 ===
Rank	Athlete	Nation	1	2	3	4	Result	Notes
1	Ingeborg Grünwald	Austria	5.91	5.97	6.11	5.90	6.11	
2	Emma Piffaretti	Switzerland	6.06	x	x	x	6.06	
3	Klaudia Endrész	Hungary	5.98	5.92	5.87	6.05	6.05	
4	Maité Beernaert	Belgium	5.91	x	6.01	x	6.01	
5	Linda Suchá	Czech Republic	x	x	5.90	5.96	5.96	
6	Azuki Nakatsugawa	Japan	x	5.86	5.62	x	5.86	
7	Mariia Horielova	Ukraine	5.45	5.65	5.67	5.71	5.71	
8	Lissandra Campos	Brazil	5.48	5.68	5.29	5.34	5.68	
9	Saskia Woidy	Germany	x	x	5.64	x	5.64	
10	Sophie Meredith	Ireland	5.59	5.50	5.49	x	5.59	
11	Victory George	Nigeria	5.51	5.53	5.58	5.40	5.58	
12	Rocío Muñoz	Chile	x	x	5.45	x	5.45	
13	Sara Solano	Mexico	x	4.98	5.00	4.93	5.00	
14	Dahlia Barnes	Antigua and Barbuda	4.91	4.79	4.97	4.91	4.97	

=== Stage 2 ===
Rank	Athlete	Nation	1	2	3	4	Result	Notes
1	Maité Beernaert	Belgium	5.83w	4.57w	5.87	6.31w	6.31w	
2	Klaudia Endrész	Hungary	6.20	x	6.01	6.26w	6.26w	
3	Ingeborg Grünwald	Austria	6.20w	6.05w	6.19*	x	6.20w	*PB
4	Emma Piffaretti	Switzerland	6.18w	5.84w	5.92w	5.92w	6.18w	
5	Azuki Nakatsugawa	Japan	6.01w	x	6.14w	5.94w	6.14w	
6	Saskia Woidy	Germany	6.06w	x	6.06w	6.10w	6.10w	
7	Linda Suchá	Czech Republic	x	6.01w	5.93	5.95w	6.01w	
8	Lissandra Campos	Brazil	5.98w	x	5.72w	5.66w	5.98w	
9	Mariia Horielova	Ukraine	5.77	5.79w	5.77	x	5.79w	
10	Sophie Meredith	Ireland	5.78	x	5.58	5.67w	5.78	
11	Victory George	Nigeria	5.71	5.50w	5.37	x	5.71	
12	Rocío Muñoz	Chile	5.61w	5.37w	5.24w	5.37w	5.61w	
13	Dahlia Barnes	Antigua and Barbuda	4.42w	x	5.28	5.10w	5.28	
14	Sara Solano	Mexico	x	x	x	5.23w	5.23w	

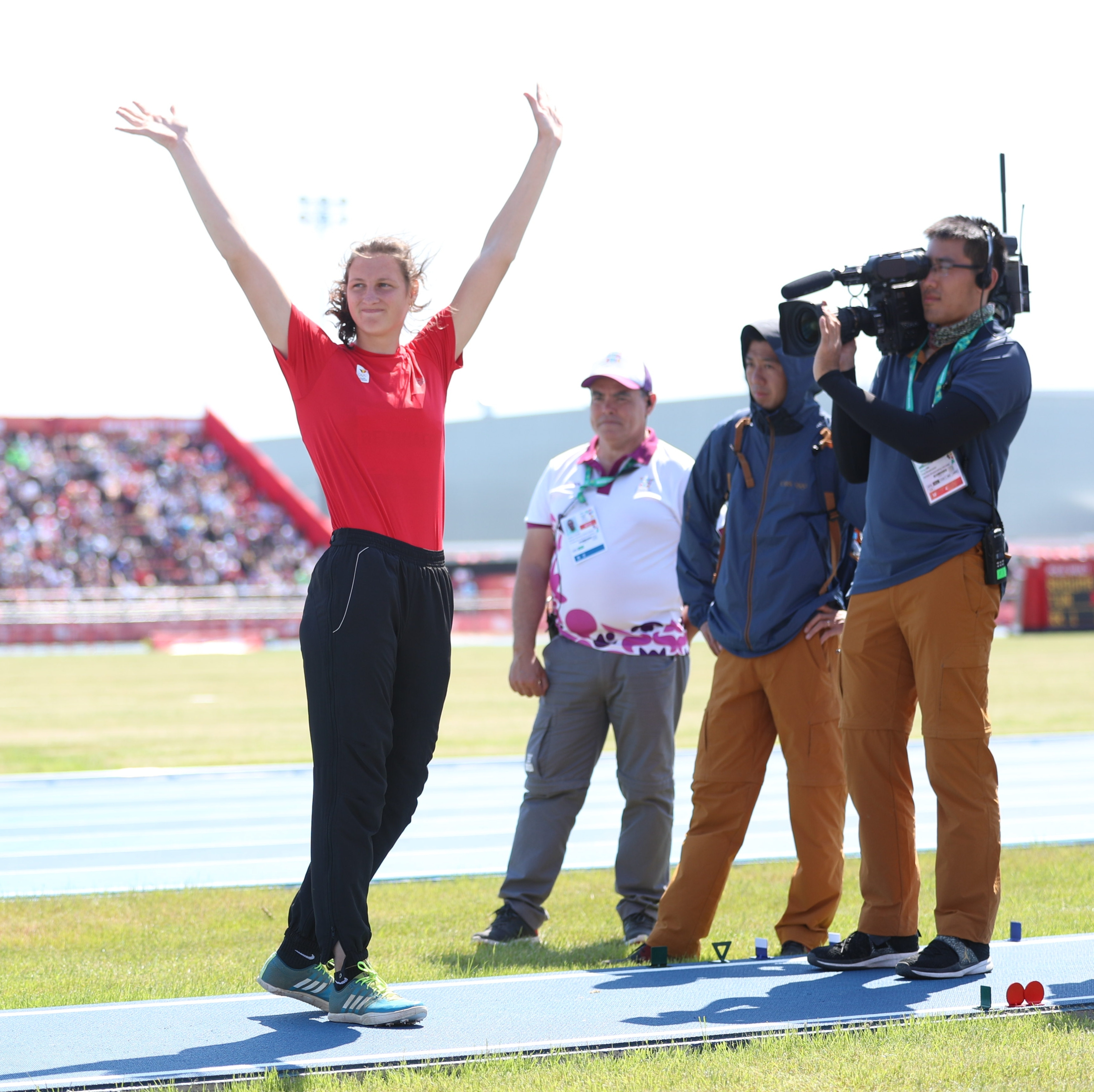
Maité Beernaert

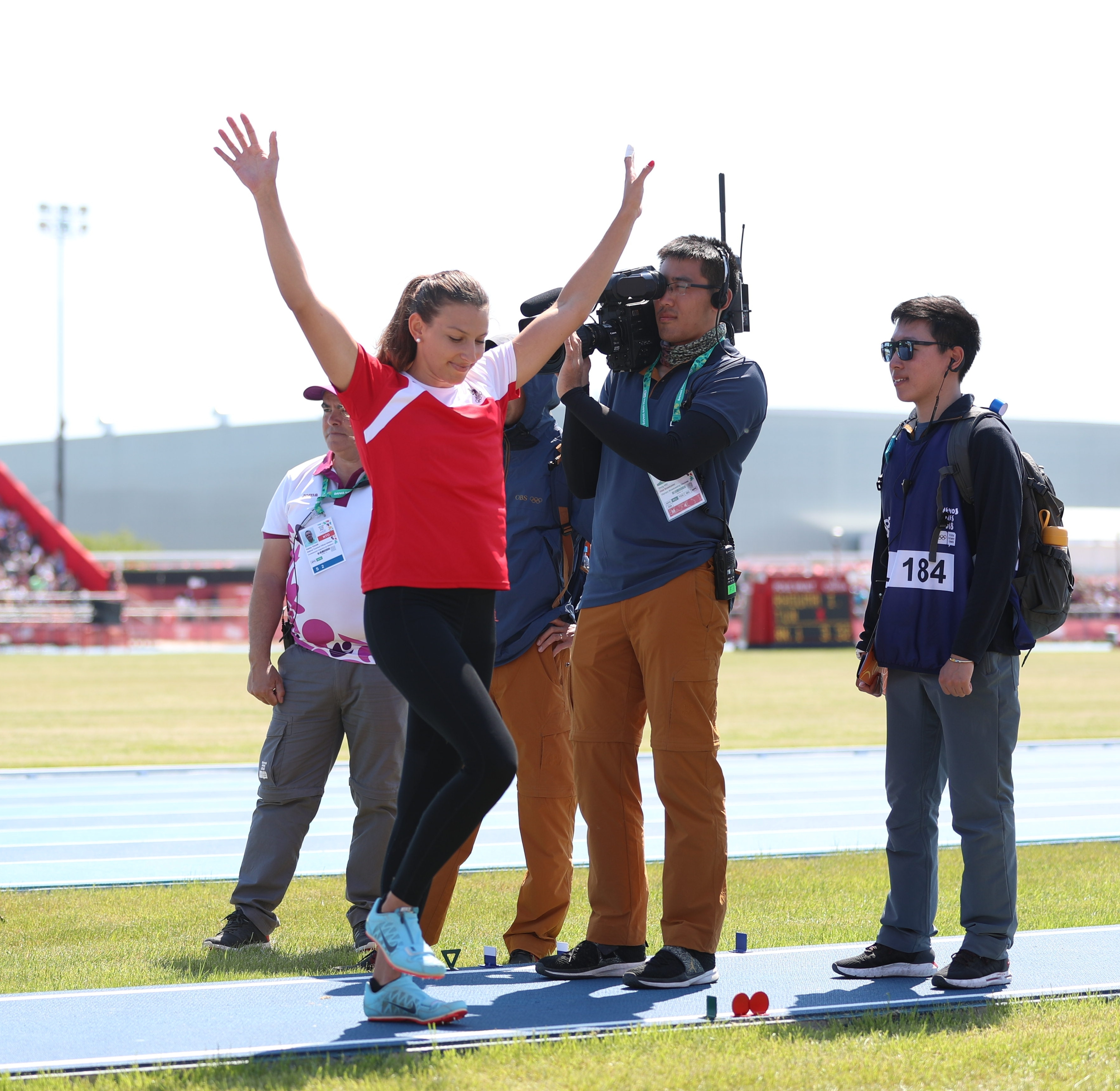
Ingeborg Grünwald

=== Final placing ===
Rank	Athlete	Nation	Stage 1	Stage 2	Total
1st place, gold medalist(s)	Maité Beernaert	Belgium	6.01	6.31	12.32
2nd place, silver medalist(s)	Klaudia Endrész	Hungary	6.05	6.26	12.31
3rd place, bronze medalist(s)	Ingeborg Grünwald	Austria	6.11	6.20	12.31
4	Emma Piffaretti	Switzerland	6.06	6.18	12.24
5	Azuki Nakatsugawa	Japan	5.86	6.14	12.00
6	Linda Suchá	Czech Republic	5.96	6.01	11.97
7	Saskia Woidy	Germany	5.64	6.10	11.74
8	Lissandra Campos	Brazil	5.68	5.98	11.66
9	Mariia Horielova	Ukraine	5.71	5.79	11.50
10	Sophie Meredith	Ireland	5.59	5.78	11.37
11	Victory George	Nigeria	5.58	5.71	11.29
12	Rocío Muñoz	Chile	5.45	5.61	11.06
13	Dahlia Barnes	Antigua and Barbuda	4.97	5.28	10.25
14	Sara Solano	Mexico	5.00	5.23	10.23
