= Athletics at the 2018 Summer Youth Olympics – Boys' 400 metre hurdles =

Boys' 400 metre hurdles at the III Summer Youth Olympic Games
- Venue: Parque Polideportivo Roca
- Date: 13, 16 October
- Competitors: 16 from 16 nations

Medalists
| 1st place, gold medalist(s) | | Haruto Deguchi; Japan |
| 2nd place, silver medalist(s) | | Dániel Huller; Hungary |
| 3rd place, bronze medalist(s) | | Mohammed Duhaim Al-Muawi; Saudi Arabia |

The boys' 400 metre hurdles metres competition at the 2018 Summer Youth Olympics was held on 13 and 16 October, at the Parque Polideportivo Roca.

== Schedule ==
All times are in local time (UTC-3).

| Date | Time | Round |
|---|---|---|
| 13 October 2018 | 15:15 | Stage 1 |
| 16 October 2018 | 15:40 | Stage 2 |

== Results ==
=== Stage 1 ===
| Rank | Heat | Lane | Athlete | Nation | Result | Notes |
|---|---|---|---|---|---|---|
| 1 | 1 | 1 | Haruto Deguchi | Japan | 51.40 | QH2, PB |
| 2 | 1 | 7 | Lindukuhle Gora | South Africa | 51.70 | QH2, PB |
| 3 | 2 | 3 | Dániel Huller | Hungary | 51.98 | QH2 |
| 4 | 1 | 3 | Pedro Garrido | Argentina | 52.22 | QH2, PB |
| 5 | 1 | 2 | Caio de Almeida | Brazil | 52.27 | QH2 |
| 6 | 2 | 8 | Mohammed Duhaim Al-Muawi | Saudi Arabia | 52.76 | QH2, PB |
| 7 | 1 | 5 | Martin Fraysse | France | 53.13 | QH2 |
| 8 | 2 | 5 | Shanthamoi Brown | Jamaica | 53.87 | QH2 |
| 9 | 2 | 2 | Thomas Throssell | Australia | 54.22 | QH1 |
| 10 | 1 | 6 | Alejandro Gil | Mexico | 54.89 | QH1 |
| 11 | 2 | 6 | Ignacio Sáez | Spain | 55.05 | QH1 |
| 12 | 2 | 4 | Chang Chun-yu | Chinese Taipei | 55.16 | QH1 |
| 13 | 2 | 7 | Matthew Thompson | Bahamas | 55.43 | QH1 |
| 14 | 2 | 1 | Mauricio Lizano | Costa Rica | 56.00 | QH1 |
| 15 | 1 | 4 | Rami Balti | Tunisia | 56.03 | QH1 |
| | 1 | 8 | Eloi Kiendrebeogo | Burkina Faso | DQ | 163.3a |

=== Stage 2 ===
| Rank | Heat | Lane | Athlete | Nation | Result | Notes |
|---|---|---|---|---|---|---|
| 1 | 2 | 6 | Haruto Deguchi | Japan | 51.28 | PB |
| 2 | 2 | 4 | Dániel Huller | Hungary | 51.86 | |
| 3 | 2 | 1 | Martin Fraysse | France | 52.72 | |
| 4 | 2 | 7 | Mohammed Duhaim Al-Muawi | Saudi Arabia | 53.05 | |
| 5 | 2 | 2 | Shanthamoi Brown | Jamaica | 53.27 | |
| 6 | 1 | 6 | Thomas Throssell | Australia | 53.27 | |
| 7 | 1 | 5 | Alejandro Gil | Mexico | 54.29 | |
| 8 | 1 | 3 | Chang Chun-yu | Chinese Taipei | 54.35 | |
| 9 | 2 | 5 | Pedro Garrido | Argentina | 54.56 | |
| 10 | 1 | 2 | Rami Balti | Tunisia | 54.59 | |
| 11 | 1 | 4 | Ignacio Sáez | Spain | 55.31 | |
| 12 | 1 | 7 | Matthew Thompson | Bahamas | 55.38 | |
| 13 | 2 | 7 | Caio de Almeida | Brazil | 55.65 | |
| 14 | 1 | 8 | Mauricio Lizano | Costa Rica | 55.90 | |
| 15 | 1 | 1 | Eloi Kiendrebeogo | Burkina Faso | 58.84 | PB |
| | 2 | 3 | Lindukuhle Gora | South Africa | DQ | 163.3a |

=== Final placing ===
| Rank | Athlete | Nation | Stage 1 | Stage 2 | Total |
|---|---|---|---|---|---|
| 1st place, gold medalist(s) | Haruto Deguchi | Japan | 51.40 | 51.28 | 1:42.68 |
| 2nd place, silver medalist(s) | Dániel Huller | Hungary | 51.98 | 51.86 | 1:43.84 |
| 3rd place, bronze medalist(s) | Mohammed Duhaim Al-Muawi | Saudi Arabia | 52.76 | 53.05 | 1:45.81 |
| 4 | Martin Fraysse | France | 53.13 | 52.72 | 1:45.85 |
| 5 | Pedro Garrido | Argentina | 52.22 | 54.56 | 1:46.78 |
| 6 | Shanthamoi Brown | Jamaica | 53.87 | 53.27 | 1:47.14 |
| 7 | Thomas Throssell | Australia | 54.22 | 53.27 | 1:47.49 |
| 8 | Caio de Almeida | Brazil | 52.27 | 55.65 | 1:47.92 |
| 9 | Alejandro Gil | Mexico | 54.89 | 54.29 | 1:49.18 |
| 10 | Chang Chun-yu | Chinese Taipei | 55.16 | 54.35 | 1:49.51 |
| 11 | Ignacio Sáez | Spain | 55.05 | 55.31 | 1:50.36 |
| 12 | Rami Balti | Tunisia | 56.03 | 54.59 | 1:50.62 |
| 13 | Matthew Thompson | Bahamas | 55.43 | 55.38 | 1:50.81 |
| 14 | Mauricio Lizano | Costa Rica | 56.00 | 55.90 | 1:51.90 |
| | Lindukuhle Gora | South Africa | 51.70 | DQ | |
| | Eloi Kiendrebeogo | Burkina Faso | DQ | 58.84 | |
