= Benin at the 2018 Summer Youth Olympics =

- IOC code: BEN
- NOC: Benin National Olympic and Sports Committee

in Buenos Aires, Argentina 6 – 18 October 2018
- Competitors: 3 in 3 sports
- Medals: Gold 0 Silver 0 Bronze 0 Total 0

Summer Youth Olympics appearances
- 2010; 2014; 2018

Benin participated at the 2018 Summer Youth Olympics in Buenos Aires, Argentina from 6 October to 18 October 2018.

== Athletics ==
Girls

Athlete	Event	Stage 1	Stage 2	Final Placing
Josee Mireille Dedewanou	200 m	27.42 PB	26.88 PB	20

== Swimming ==
Girls

Athlete	Event	Heat		Semifinal		Final	
Athlete	Event	Time	Rank	Time	Rank	Time	Rank
Nafissath Abeke Radji	50 m freestyle	31.93	46	did not advance			
Nafissath Abeke Radji	50 m backstroke	37.89	38	did not advance			

== Tennis ==
Boys

Athlete	Event	First round	Second round	Quarterfinals	Semifinals	Final / BM	
Athlete	Event	Opposition Score	Opposition Score	Opposition Score	Opposition Score	Opposition Score	Rank
Delmas Ntcha	Singles	Michalski (POL); L 0–2	did not advance				

Mixed NOC

Athlete	Event	First round	Second round	Quarterfinals	Semifinals	Final / BM	
Athlete	Event	Opposition Score	Opposition Score	Opposition Score	Opposition Score	Opposition Score	Rank
Mixed-NOCs; Delmas Ntcha (BEN); Philip Henning (RSA)	Boys' doubles	Mixed-NOCs; Andreev (BUL); Hijikata (AUS); L 0–2	did not advance				
Mixed-NOCs; Delmas Ntcha (BEN); Georgia Drummy (IRL)	Mixed doubles	Mixed-NOCs; Sato (JPN); Soares Klier Junior (BRA); L 0–2	did not advance				
