= Sun Jiajun (swimmer) =

Chinese swimmer (born 2000)

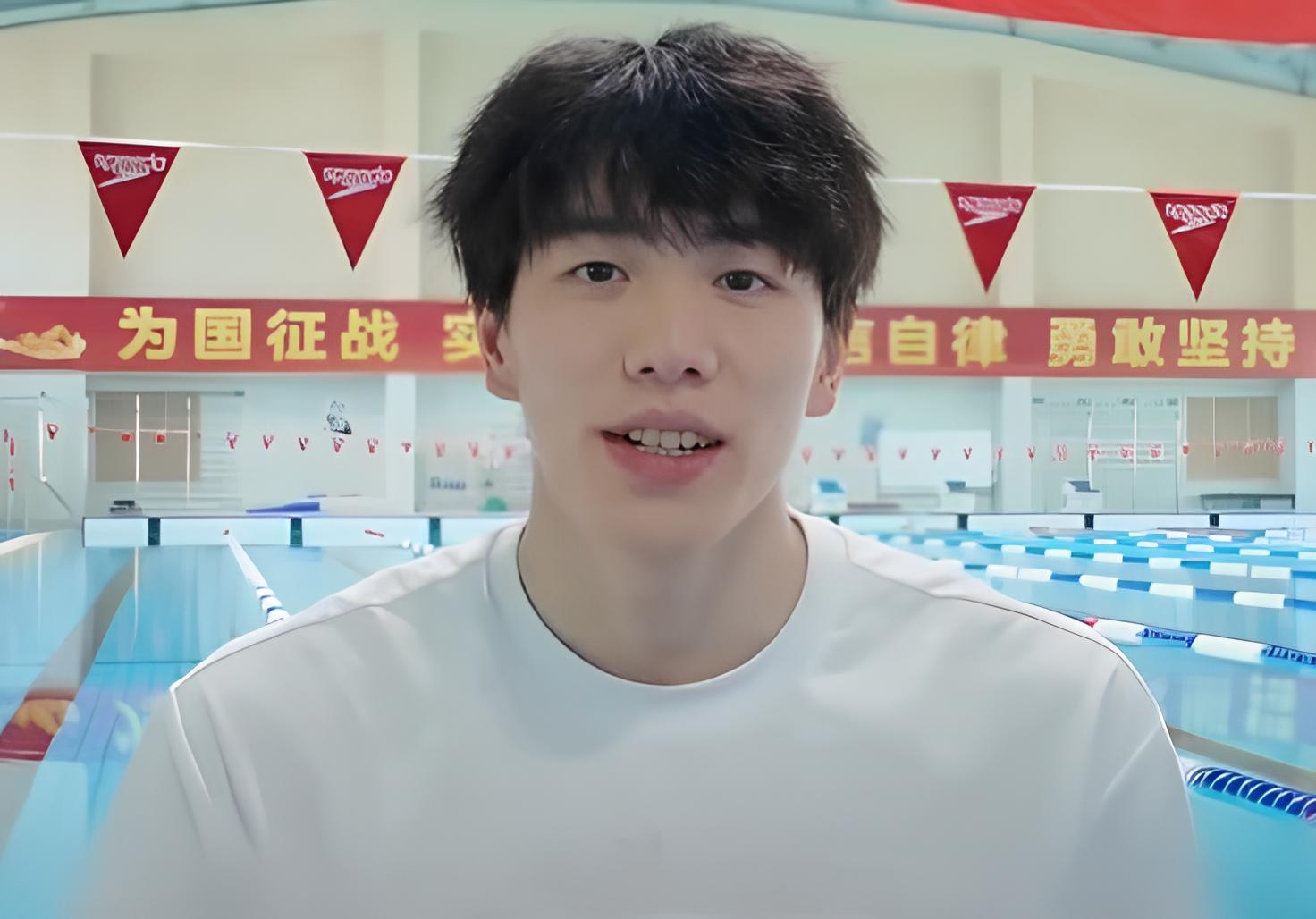
- Sun in 2024

Personal information
- Nationality: Chinese
- Born: 1 August 2000 (age 25) Yichang, Hubei, China
- Height: 1.83 m (6 ft 0 in)
- Weight: 75 kg (165 lb)

Sport
- Sport: Swimming
- Strokes: Breaststroke, Butterfly stroke
Medal record
Representing China
Olympic Games
Gold medal – first place	2024 Paris	4 × 100 m medley
World Championships (LC)
Silver medal – second place	2023 Fukuoka	4×100 m medley
Bronze medal – third place	2023 Fukuoka	50 m breaststroke
Asian Games
Gold medal – first place	2022 Hangzhou	4×100 m medley
Silver medal – second place	2022 Hangzhou	50 m breaststroke
Summer Youth Olympics
Gold medal – first place	2018 Buenos Aires	100 m breaststroke
Gold medal – first place	2018 Buenos Aires	4×100 m mixed medley
Silver medal – second place	2018 Buenos Aires	50 m breaststroke
Silver medal – second place	2018 Buenos Aires	4×100 m medley

Sun Jiajun (Chinese: 孙佳俊, born 1 August 2000) is a Chinese swimmer. He won the gold medal in the boys' 100-metre breaststroke and 4 × 100-metre mixed medley relay events at the 2018 Summer Youth Olympics held in Buenos Aires, Argentina. He also won the silver medal in the boys' 50-metre breaststroke and 4 × 100-metre medley relay categories in the same event. In 2021, he qualified to represent China in the men's 4 × 100-metre medley relay event at the 2020 Summer Olympics held in Tokyo, Japan.

== See also ==
- List of Youth Olympic Games gold medalists who won Olympic gold medals
