= Comoros at the 2018 Summer Youth Olympics =

- IOC code: COM
- NOC: Comité Olympique et Sportif des Iles Comores

in Buenos Aires
- Competitors: 3 in 2 sports
- Medals: Gold 0 Silver 0 Bronze 0 Total 0

Summer Youth Olympics appearances
- 2010; 2014; 2018; 2026

Comoros competed at the 2018 Summer Youth Olympics in Buenos Aires, Argentina from 6 October to 18 October 2018.

== Competitors ==
Sport	Boys	Girls	Total
Athletics	1	1	2
Swimming	0	1	1

== Athletics ==
Boys

Athlete	Event	Stage 1		Stage 2		Total	
Athlete	Event	Result	Rank	Result	Rank	Total	Rank
Mohamed Mouigni Dahalane	Boys' 200 m	DNF		DNS		–	

Girls

Athlete	Event	Stage 1		Stage 2		Total	
Athlete	Event	Result	Rank	Result	Rank	Total	Rank
Youssouf Said Moina Rouzouna	Girls' 100 m	14.58	35	DNS		–	

== Swimming ==
Comoros qualified 1 girl for the competition.

Girls

Athlete	Event	Heat		Semifinal		Final	
Athlete	Event	Time	Rank	Time	Rank	Time	Rank
Maria Abdallah Attoumani	50 m freestyle	DSQ		did not advance			
Maria Abdallah Attoumani	50 m breastroke	1:00.13	42	did not advance			
