= Swimming at the 2022 Asian Games – Men's 50 metre breaststroke =

Men's 50 metre breaststroke at the 2022 Asian Games
- Venue: Hangzhou Olympic Expo Aquatics Center
- Date: 29 September 2023
- Competitors: 26 from 19 nations

Medalists
gold medal	Qin Haiyang	China
silver medal	Sun Jiajun	China
bronze medal	Choi Dong-yeol	South Korea

The men's 50 metre breaststroke event at the 2022 Asian Games took place on 29 September 2023 at the Hangzhou Olympic Expo Center.

== Schedule ==
All times are China Standard Time (UTC+08:00)

Date	Time	Event
Friday, 29 September 2023	10:11	Heats
Friday, 29 September 2023	19:36	Final

== Records ==
Prior to this competition, the existing world, Asian and Games records were as follows.

World Record	Adam Peaty (GBR)	25.95	Budapest, Hungary	25 July 2017
Asian Record	Qin Haiyang (CHN)	26.20	Fukuoka, Japan	25 July 2023
Games Record	Qin Haiyang (CHN)	26.69	Hangzhou, China	25 September 2023

== Results ==
=== Heats ===
Rank	Heat	Athlete	Time	Notes
1	3	Qin Haiyang (CHN)	26.25	GR
2	4	Sun Jiajun (CHN)	27.01	
3	4	Choi Dong-yeol (KOR)	27.06	
4	2	Yuya Hinomoto (JPN)	27.39	
5	3	Chao Man Hou (MAC)	27.86	
6	2	Ippei Watanabe (JPN)	28.05	
7	4	Muhammad Dwiky Raharjo (INA)	28.36	
8	3	Arsen Kozhakhmetov (KAZ)	28.40	
9	3	Maximillian Ang (SGP)	28.49	
10	4	Ng Yan Kin (HKG)	28.71	
11	2	Phạm Thanh Bảo (VIE)	28.79	
12	2	Thanonchai Janruksa (THA)	28.83	
13	4	Fong Ka Yu (HKG)	28.94	
14	3	Choi Ngou Fai (MAC)	29.20	
15	2	Rachasil Mahamongkol (THA)	29.50	
16	3	Behruz Akhtamov (UZB)	30.05	
17	4	Abdulla Al-Khaldi (QAT)	30.23	
18	4	Omar Al-Hammadi (UAE)	30.67	
19	2	Ganzorigtyn Sugar (MGL)	30.71	
20	3	Fahim Anwari (AFG)	31.33	
21	1	Ariunsükhiin Amirlangui (MGL)	34.23	
22	4	Mubal Azzam Ibrahim (MDV)	34.24	
23	2	Muhammad Hamza Anwar (PAK)	35.30	
24	3	Ahmed Neeq Niyaz (MDV)	36.13	
25	1	Phoumbandith Keopaseuth (LAO)	36.39	
26	1	Olimjon Ishanov (TJK)	37.39	

=== Final ===
Rank	Athlete	Time	Notes
1st place, gold medalist(s)	Qin Haiyang (CHN)	26.35	
2nd place, silver medalist(s)	Sun Jiajun (CHN)	26.92	
3rd place, bronze medalist(s)	Choi Dong-yeol (KOR)	26.93	
4	Yuya Hinomoto (JPN)	27.61	
5	Chao Man Hou (MAC)	27.76	
6	Ippei Watanabe (JPN)	28.23	
7	Arsen Kozhakhmetov (KAZ)	28.42	
8	Muhammad Dwiky Raharjo (INA)	28.52	
