= Athletics at the 2018 Summer Youth Olympics – Girls' pole vault =

Girls' pole vault at the III Summer Youth Olympic Games
- Venue: Parque Polideportivo Roca
- Date: 11 October and 14 October 2018
- Competitors: 15 from 15 nations

Medalists
1st place, gold medalist(s)		Leni Freyja Wildgrube	Germany
2nd place, silver medalist(s)		Emma Brentel	France
3rd place, bronze medalist(s)		Krystsina Kantsavenka	Belarus

The girls' pole vault competition at the 2018 Summer Youth Olympics was held on 11 and 14 October, at the Parque Polideportivo Roca.

== Schedule ==
All times are in local time (UTC-3).

Date	Time	Round
Thursday, 11 October 2018	14:40	Stage 1
Sunday, 14 October 2018	14:00	Stage 2

== Results ==
=== Stage 1 ===
Rank	Athlete	Nation	3.25	3.35	3.45	3.55	3.65	3.75	3.85	3.90	3.95	4.05	Result	Notes
1	Leni Freyja Wildgrube	Germany	–	–	–	–	–	–	xo	–	o	xxx	3.95	
2	Emma Brentel	France	–	–	–	–	o	o	xo	xo	xxx		3.90	
3	Marleen Mülla	Estonia	–	–	–	xo	o	xo	o	xxx			3.85	
4	Krystsina Kantsavenka	Belarus	–	–	–	–	o	o	xxx				3.75	
5	Javiera Contreras	Chile	–	o	o	o	o	xxx					3.65	=PB
5	Veronika Šebáková	Czech Republic	–	o	o	o	o	xxx					3.65	
7	Maja Gebauer	Hungary	–	xxo	o	xxo	o	xxx					3.65	
8	Alex Throndson	Canada	–	–	o	–	xo	xxx					3.65	
9	Mariia Yashchenko	Ukraine	–	xo	–	xo	xxo	xxx					3.65	
10	Karen Bedoya	Colombia	o	xo	xxo	xxo	xxx						3.55	
11	Rosaidi Robles Naranjo	Cuba	–	–	xxo	xxx							3.45	
12	Imen Rhouma	Tunisia	o	o	xxx								3.35	
	Ana Chacón	Spain	–	–	xxx								NM	
	Diva Renatta Jayadi	Indonesia	–	–	xxx								NM	
	Sumeyye Kinar	Turkey	–	xxx									NM	

=== Stage 2 ===
Rank	Athlete	Nation	3.22	3.32	3.42	3.52	3.62	3.72	3.82	3.87	3.92	3.97	4.02	4.07	4.17	4.27	Result	Notes
1	Leni Freyja Wildgrube	Germany	–	–	–	–	–	–	xo	–	xo	o	o	o	xo	xxx	4.17	
2	Krystsina Kantsavenka	Belarus	–	–	–	–	o	xo	o	o	xo	xo	xx–	x			3.97	
3	Emma Brentel	France	–	–	–	–	–	o	o	–	o	xxx					3.92	
4	Marleen Mülla	Estonia	–	–	–	o	o	xxo	o	xx–	x						3.82	
4	Alex Throndson	Canada	–	–	o	o	xxo	o	o	xxx							3.82	
6	Maja Gebauer	Hungary	–	o	–	o	o	o	xxx								3.72	
7	Veronika Šebáková	Czech Republic	–	–	xo	o	o	xxo	xxx								3.72	
8	Javiera Contreras	Chile	–	o	o	o	xo	xxx									3.62	
9	Rosaidi Robles Naranjo	Cuba	–	–	–	o	xxo	xxx									3.62	
10	Ana Chacón	Spain	–	–	–	o	xxx										3.52	
10	Diva Renatta Jayadi	Indonesia	–	–	o	o	xxx										3.52	
10	Sumeyye Kinar	Turkey	–	o	o	o	xxx										3.52	
13	Karen Bedoya	Colombia	o	xxo	xo	xxo	xxx										3.52	
14	Mariia Yashchenko	Ukraine	–	xo	xxo	xxx											3.42	
15	Imen Rhouma	Tunisia	o	xxx													3.22	

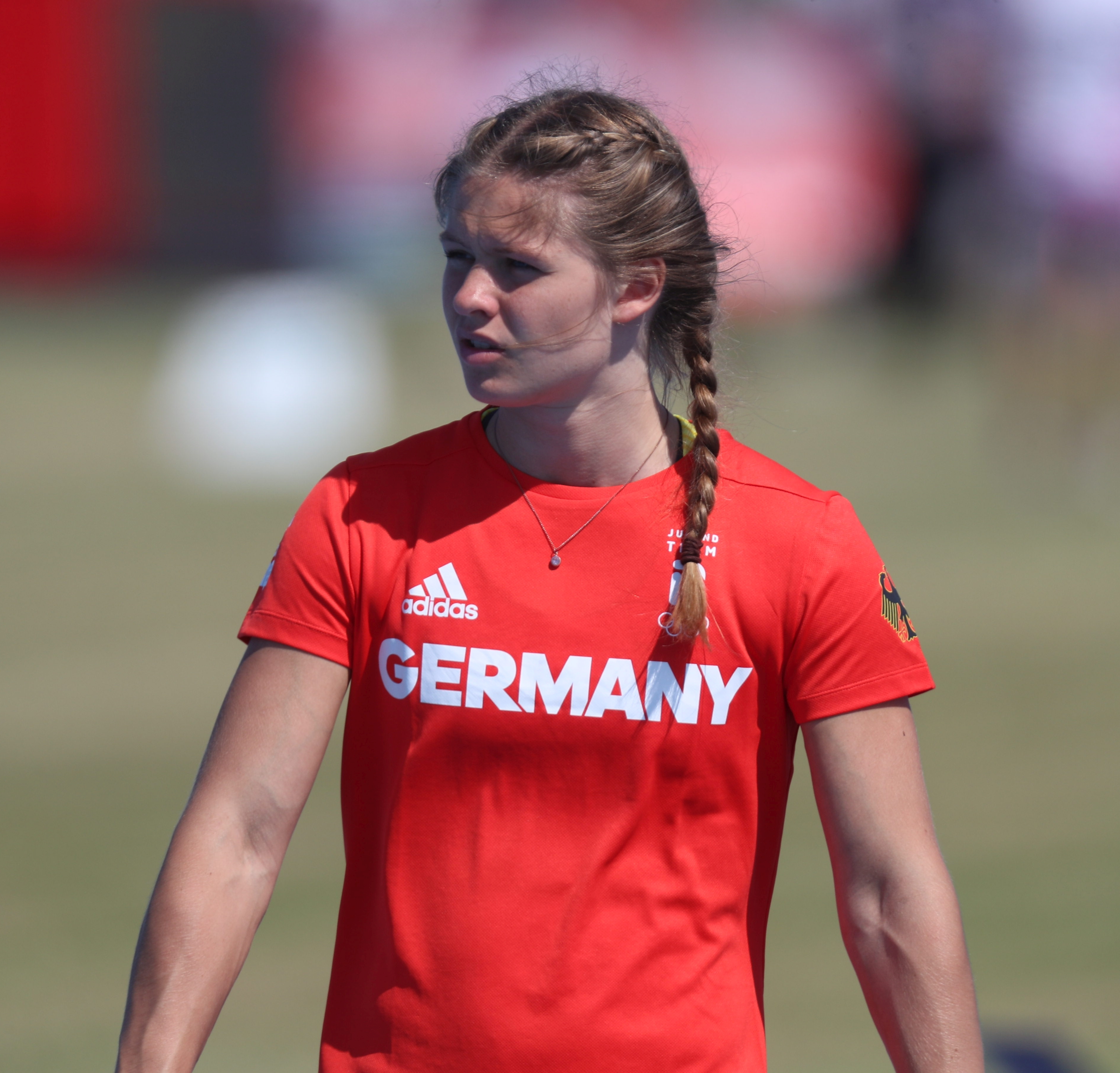
Leni Freyja Wildgrube

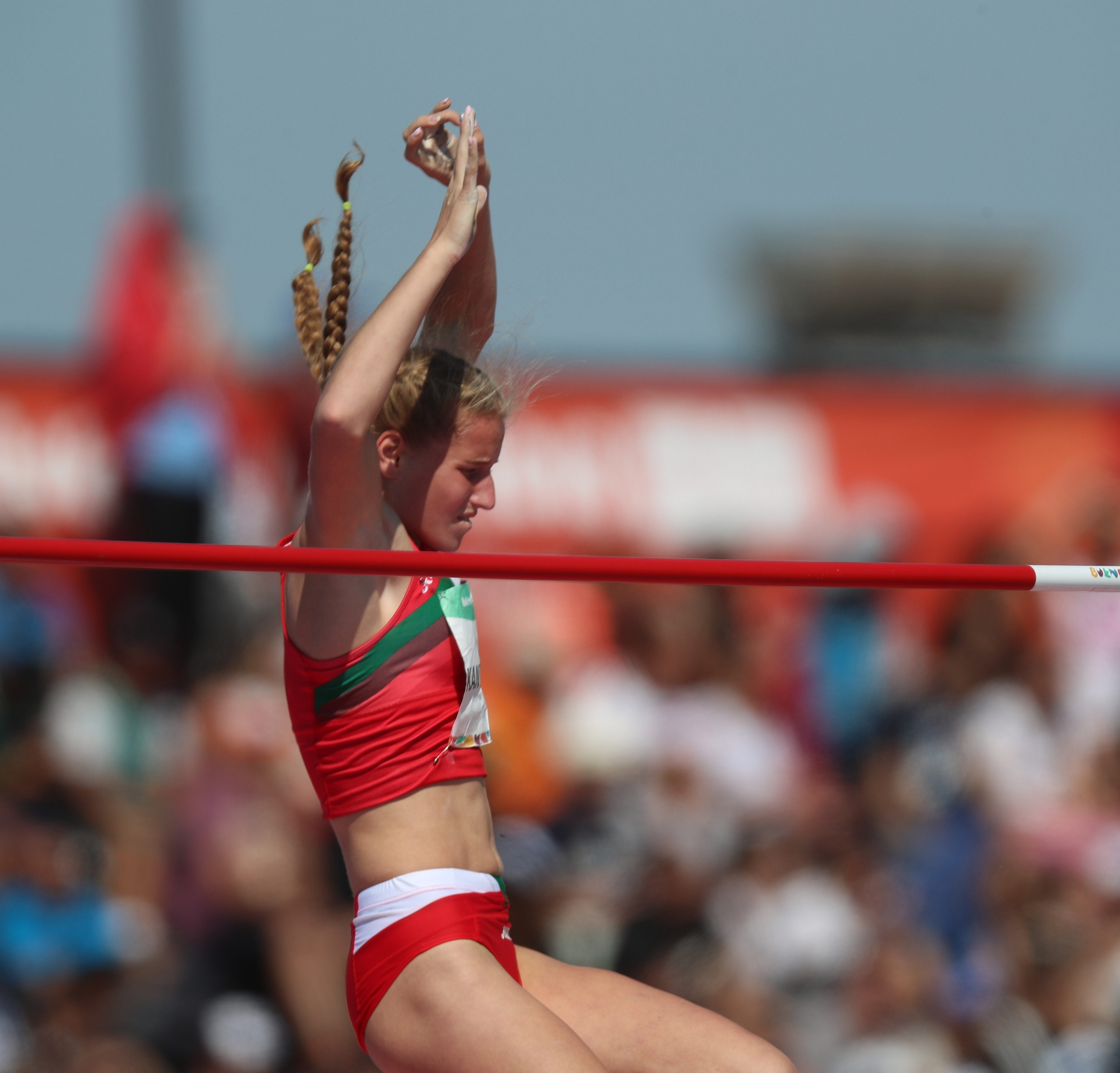
Krystsina Kantsavenka

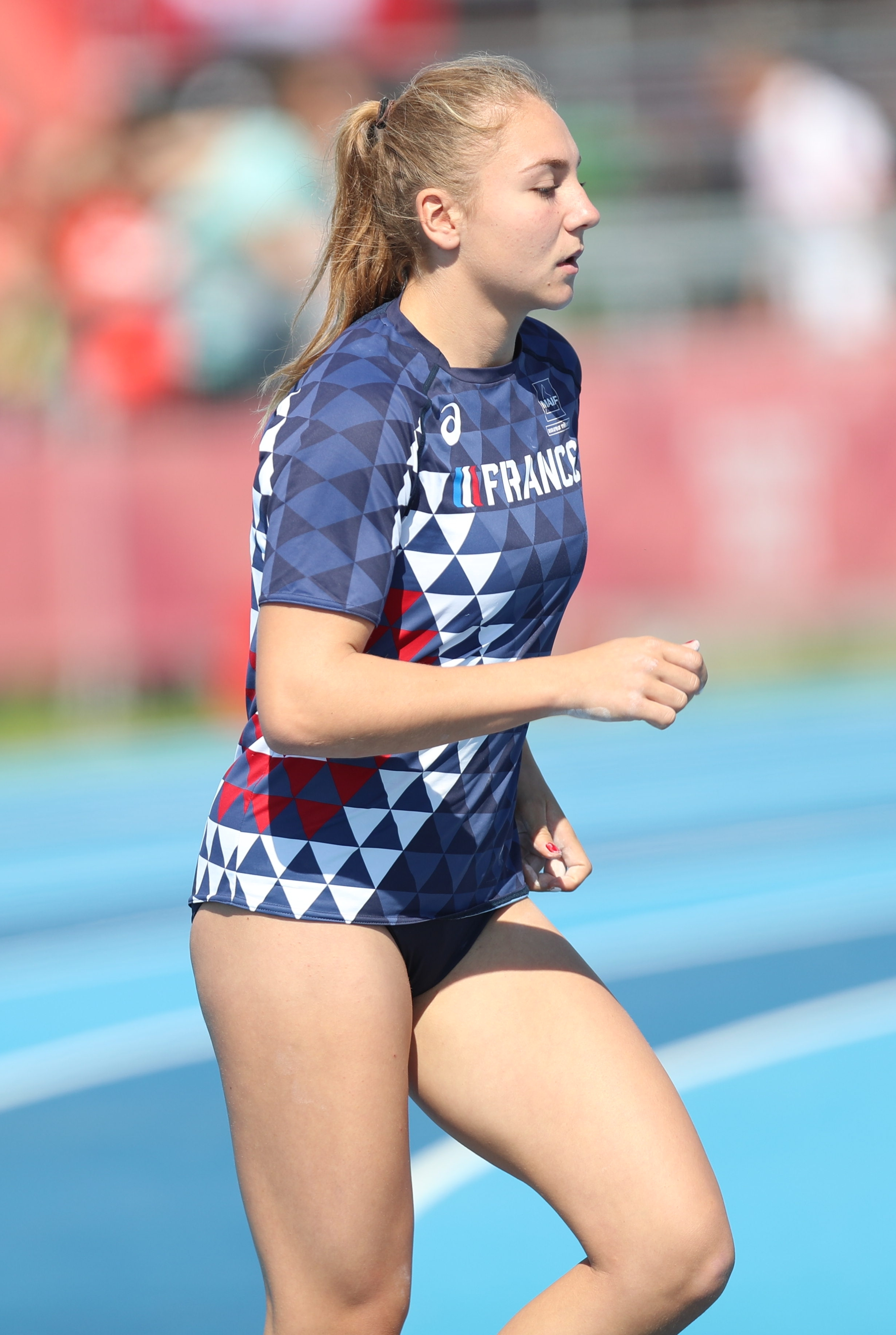
Emma Brentel

=== Final placing ===
Rank	Athlete	Nation	Stage 1	Stage 2	Total
1st place, gold medalist(s)	Leni Freyja Wildgrube	Germany	3.95	4.17	8.12
2nd place, silver medalist(s)	Emma Brentel	France	3.90	3.92	7.82
3rd place, bronze medalist(s)	Krystsina Kantsavenka	Belarus	3.75	3.97	7.72
4	Marleen Mülla	Estonia	3.85	3.82	7.67
5	Alex Throndson	Canada	3.65	3.82	7.47
6	Maja Gebauer	Hungary	3.65	3.72	7.37
6	Veronika Šebáková	Czech Republic	3.65	3.72	7.37
8	Javiera Contreras	Chile	3.65	3.62	7.27
9	Mariia Yashchenko	Ukraine	3.65	3.42	7.07
10	Rosaidi Robles Naranjo	Cuba	3.45	3.62	7.07
11	Karen Bedoya	Colombia	3.55	3.52	7.07
12	Imen Rhouma	Tunisia	3.35	3.22	6.57
13	Ana Chacón	Spain	NM	3.52	3.52
13	Diva Renatta Jayadi	Indonesia	NM	3.52	3.52
13	Sumeyye Kinar	Turkey	NM	3.52	3.52
