= Abdelaziz Mohamed =

Qatari sprinter

Personal information
- Born: 20 October 2001 (age 24)

Sport
- Country: Qatar
- Sport: Track and field
- Event: Sprinting
Medal record
Men's sprinting
Representing Qatar
Summer Youth Olympics
Gold medal – first place	2018 Buenos Aires	200 m

Abdelaziz Mohamed (born 20 October 2001) is a Qatari sprinter. In 2019, he competed in the men's 200 metres at the 2019 World Athletics Championships held in Doha, Qatar. He set a time of 20.75 seconds and he did not qualify to compete in the semi-finals.

In 2018, he won the gold medal in the boys' 200 metres event at the 2018 Summer Youth Olympics held in Buenos Aires, Argentina.
