= Central African Republic at the 2018 Summer Youth Olympics =

- IOC code: CAF
- NOC: Comité National Olympique et Sportif Centrafricain

in Buenos Aires
- Competitors: 2 in 2 sports
- Flag bearer: Dante Cittadini
- Medals: Gold 0 Silver 0 Bronze 0 Total 0

Summer Youth Olympics appearances
- 2010; 2014; 2018; 2026

The Central African Republic competed at the 2018 Summer Youth Olympics in Buenos Aires, Argentina from 6 October to 18 October 2018.

== Competitors ==
Sport	Boys	Girls	Total
Athletics	1	0	1
Swimming	0	1	1

== Athletics ==
Boys

Athlete	Event	Stage 1		Stage 2		Total	
Athlete	Event	Result	Rank	Result	Rank	Total	Rank
Benjamin Ombenga	Boys' 200 m	22.51	21	21.79	20	44.30	21

== Swimming ==
The Central African Republic qualified 1 athlete for swimming at the games.

Girls

Athlete	Event	Heat		Semifinal		Final	
Athlete	Event	Time	Rank	Time	Rank	Time	Rank
Chloe Sauvourel	50 m freestyle	34.54	51	did not advance			
