= Burkina Faso at the 2018 Summer Youth Olympics =

- IOC code: BUR
- NOC: Burkinabé National Olympic and Sports Committee
- Website: http://www.coa.dz/

in Buenos Aires, Argentina 6 – 18 October 2018
- Competitors: 4
- Medals: Gold 0 Silver 0 Bronze 0 Total 0

Summer Youth Olympics appearances
- 2010; 2014; 2018

Burkina Faso participated at the 2018 Summer Youth Olympics in Buenos Aires, Argentina from 6 October to 18 October 2018.

== Athletics ==
Boys

Athlete	Event	Stage 1		Stage 2	
Athlete	Event	Result	Rank	Result	Rank
Eloi Kiendrebeogo	400 m hurdles	DQ		58.84	15

Girls

Athlete	Event	Stage 1		Stage 2		Total	
Athlete	Event	Result	Rank	Result	Rank	Result	Rank
Aminata Kabore	400 m hurdles	1:12.05	19	1:08.26	17	2:20.31	18

== Swimming ==
Burkina Faso qualified 2 competitors in swimming for the games.

Boys

Athlete	Event	Heat		Semifinal		Final	
Athlete	Event	Time	Rank	Time	Rank	Time	Rank
Omar Fadel Barry	50 m freestyle	32.44	51	did not advance			
Omar Fadel Barry	50 m breaststroke	41.81	33	did not advance			

Girls

Athlete	Event	Heat		Semifinal		Final	
Athlete	Event	Time	Rank	Time	Rank	Time	Rank
Gniene Faouzia Sessouma	50 m freestyle	42.29	53	did not advance			
Gniene Faouzia Sessouma	50 m breaststroke	57.76	41	did not advance			
