= Swimming at the 2018 Summer Youth Olympics – Boys' 100 metre backstroke =

Boys' 100 metre backstroke at the 2018 Summer Youth Olympics
- Venue: Natatorium
- Dates: 7 October (heats, semifinals); 8 October (final)
- Competitors: 25 from 24 nations
- Winning time: 53.26

Medalists
gold medal	Kliment Kolesnikov	Russia
silver medal	Daniel Cristian Martin	Romania
bronze medal	Thomas Ceccon	Italy

The boys' 100 metre backstroke event at the 2018 Summer Youth Olympics took place on 7 and 8 October at the Natatorium in Buenos Aires, Argentina.

== Results ==
=== Heats ===
The heats were started on 7 October at 10:38.

Rank	Heat	Lane	Name	Nationality	Time	Notes
1	4	4	Kliment Kolesnikov	Russia	54.26	Q
2	3	4	Daniel Cristian Martin	Romania	54.46	Q
3	2	4	Thomas Ceccon	Italy	55.33	Q
4	2	7	Tomoe Zenimoto Hvas	Norway	55.64	Q
5	4	5	Wang Guanbin	China	56.01	Q
6	2	5	Manuel Martos	Spain	56.03	Q
7	3	6	Lewis Blackburn	Australia	56.24	Q
8	3	5	Gábor Zombori	Hungary	56.46	Q
9	4	2	Srihari Nataraj	India	56.75	Q
10	3	2	Ethan Harder	United States	56.80	Q
11	4	7	Alanas Tautkus	Lithuania	56.81	Q
12	3	3	Sebastian Somerset	Canada	56.84	Q
13	4	3	Abdellah Ardjoune	Algeria	56.93	Q
14	2	6	Chuang Mu-lun	Chinese Taipei	56.94	Q
15	4	6	Jack Kirby	Barbados	57.03	Q
16	4	1	Akalanka Peiris	Sri Lanka	57.34	Q
17	2	2	Stuart Swinburn	Australia	57.46	
18	3	8	Ivan Štšeglov	Estonia	57.57	
19	3	1	Roni Kallström	Finland	57.65	
20	3	7	Marvin Miglbauer	Austria	57.84	
21	4	8	Ramy Ghaziri	Lebanon	58.27	
22	2	1	Hendrik Duvenhage	South Africa	58.31	
23	1	4	Guillermo Cruz	Mexico	58.40	
24	1	5	Marcus Mok	Hong Kong	58.63	
25	1	3	Bede Aitu	Cook Islands	1:03.49	
	2	3	Björn Seeliger	Sweden	DNS	

=== Semifinals ===
The semifinals were started on 7 October at 18:15.

Rank	Heat	Lane	Name	Nationality	Time	Notes
1	2	4	Kliment Kolesnikov	Russia	53.80	Q
2	1	4	Daniel Cristian Martin	Romania	54.08	Q
3	1	5	Tomoe Zenimoto Hvas	Norway	54.93	Q, WD
4	2	5	Thomas Ceccon	Italy	55.48	Q
5	2	3	Wang Guanbin	China	55.77	Q
6	1	6	Gábor Zombori	Hungary	56.19	Q
7	1	3	Manuel Martos	Spain	56.20	Q
8	2	6	Lewis Blackburn	Australia	56.27	Q
9	2	2	Srihari Nataraj	India	56.48	Q
10	2	7	Alanas Tautkus	Lithuania	56.49	
11	2	8	Jack Kirby	Barbados	56.67	
12	1	1	Chuang Mu-lun	Chinese Taipei	56.82	
13	1	2	Ethan Harder	United States	56.83	
14	2	1	Abdellah Ardjoune	Algeria	56.86	
15	1	7	Sebastian Somerset	Canada	56.98	
16	1	8	Akalanka Peiris	Sri Lanka	57.35	

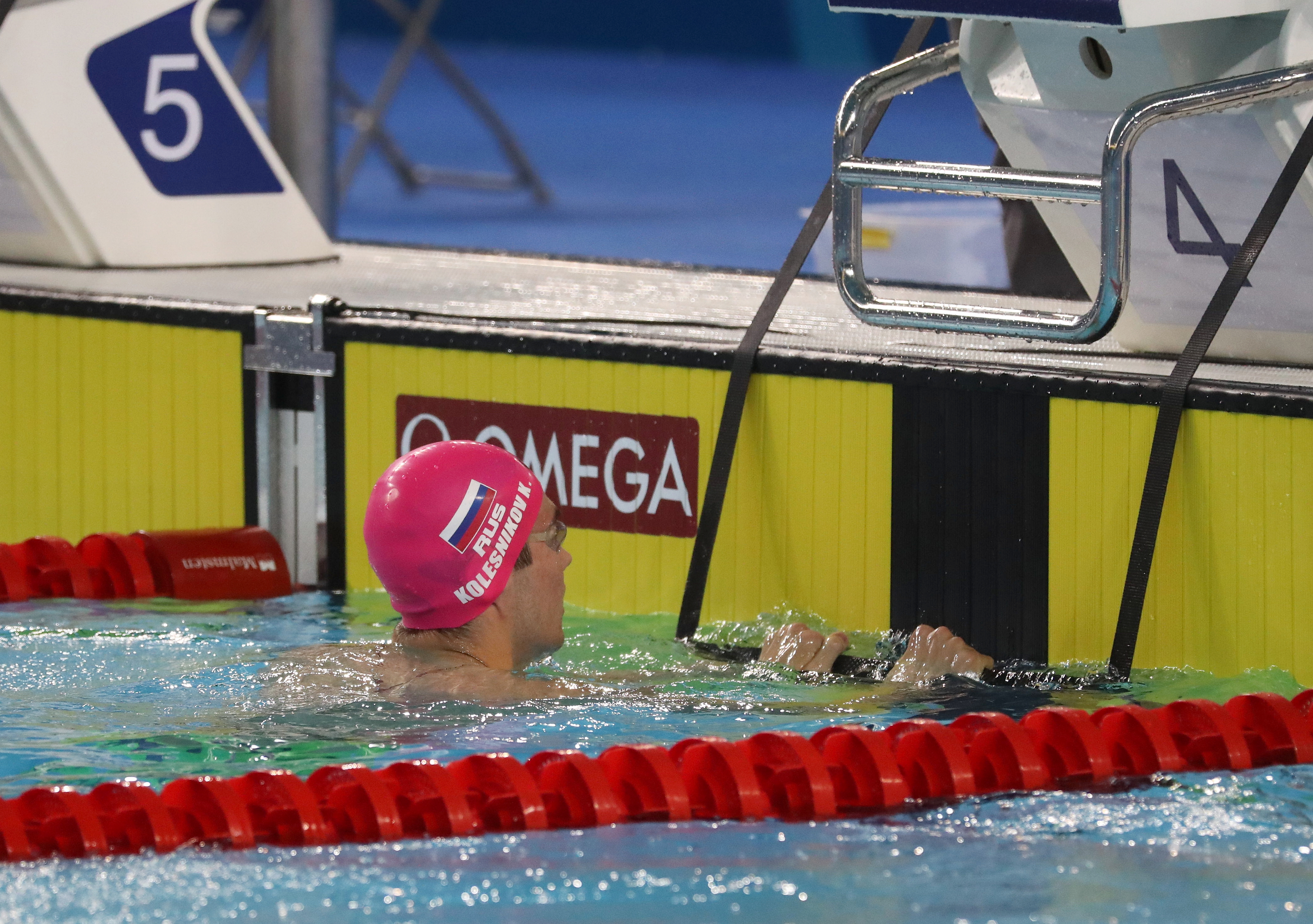
Kliment Kolesnikov

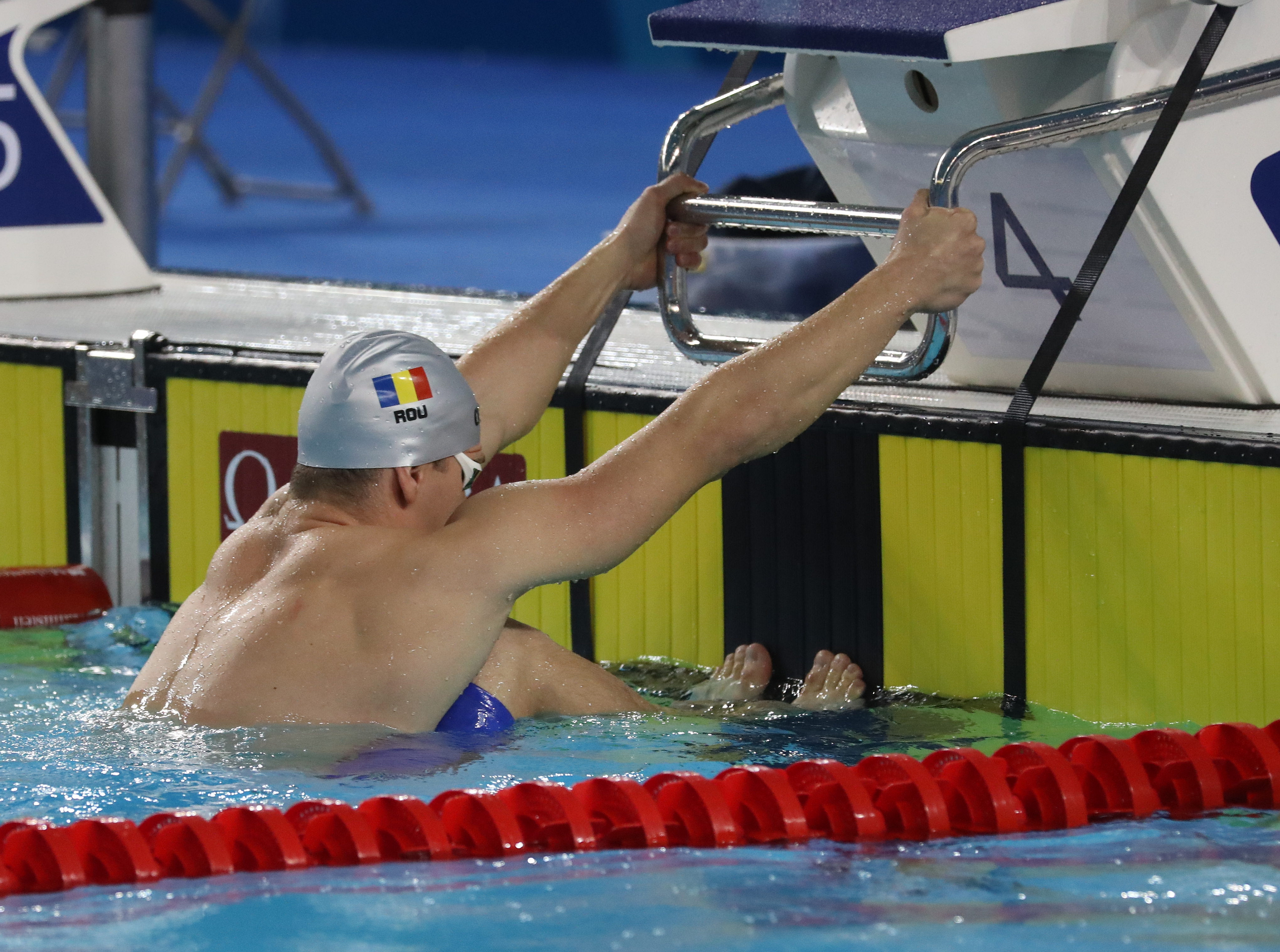
Daniel Cristian Martin

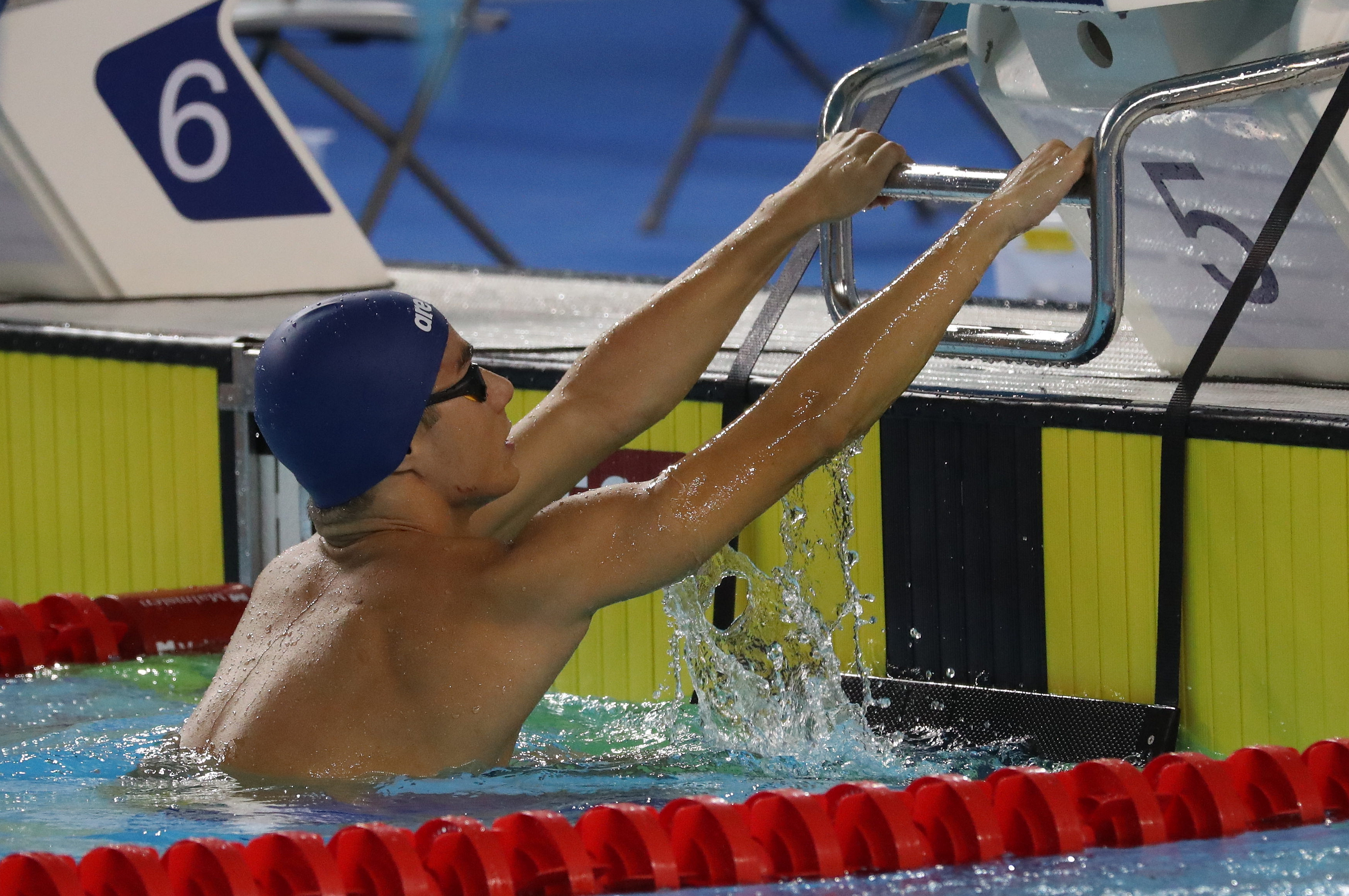
Tomoe Zenimoto Hvas

=== Final ===
The final was held on 8 October at 18:00.

Rank	Lane	Name	Nationality	Time	Notes
1st place, gold medalist(s)	4	Kliment Kolesnikov	Russia	53.26	
2nd place, silver medalist(s)	5	Daniel Cristian Martin	Romania	53.59	
3rd place, bronze medalist(s)	3	Thomas Ceccon	Italy	53.65	
4	6	Wang Guanbin	China	55.33	
5	7	Manuel Martos	Spain	55.83	
6	8	Srihari Nataraj	India	56.12	
7	2	Gábor Zombori	Hungary	56.21	
8	1	Lewis Blackburn	Australia	56.23	
