= Ivan Štšeglov =

Estonian swimmer

Personal information
- Born: 8 July 2000 (age 26)

Sport
- Sport: Swimming

Ivan Štšeglov (born 8 July 2000) is an Estonian swimmer. In 2019, he represented Estonia at the 2019 World Aquatics Championships in Gwangju, South Korea. He competed in the men's 200 metre backstroke event where he set a new Estonian record of 2:01.19.

In 2018, he competed in the boys' 100 metre backstroke and boys' 200 metre backstroke events at the 2018 Summer Youth Olympics held in Buenos Aires, Argentina.
