= Mayuka Yamamoto =

Japanese swimmer (born 2000)

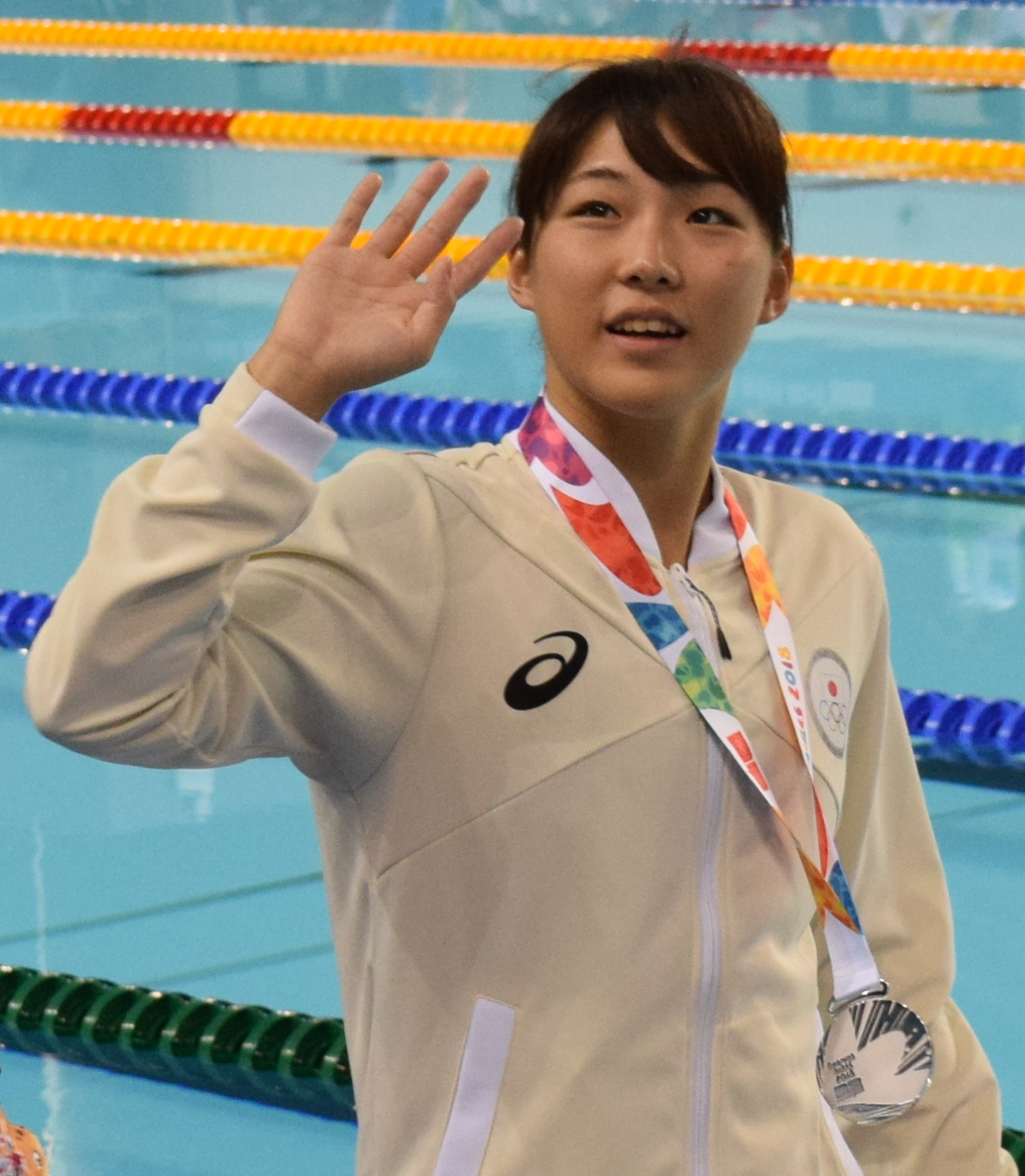
- Yamamoto at the 2018 Summer Youth Olympics

Personal information
- Born: 14 February 2000 (age 26) Tokyo, Japan

Sport
- Sport: Swimming
- Strokes: Freestyle
Medal record
Women's swimming
Representing Japan
Asian Games
Gold medal – first place	2018 Jakarta	4×100 m freestyle
Silver medal – second place	2018 Jakarta	4×100 m mixed medley
Youth Olympic Games
Silver medal – second place	2018 Buenos Aires	50 m freestyle
Bronze medal – third place	2018 Buenos Aires	4×100 m freestyle

Mayuka Yamamoto (山本 茉由佳, Yamamoto Mayuka; born 14 February 2000) is a Japanese swimmer. She competed in the women's 4 × 100 metre freestyle relay event at the 2018 Asian Games, winning the gold medal.
