= Oman at the 2018 Summer Youth Olympics =

- IOC code: OMA
- NOC: Oman Olympic Committee

in Buenos Aires, Argentina 6 – 18 October 2018
- Competitors: 5
- Medals: Gold 0 Silver 0 Bronze 0 Total 0

Summer Youth Olympics appearances
- 2010; 2014; 2018

Oman participated at the 2018 Summer Youth Olympics in Buenos Aires, Argentina from 6 October to 18 October 2018.

== Sailing ==
Oman was given one boat to compete by the tripartite committee.

- Boys' Techno 293+ - 1 boat
