= Seychelles at the 2018 Summer Youth Olympics =

- IOC code: SEY
- NOC: Seychelles Olympic and Commonwealth Games Association

in Buenos Aires, Argentina 6 – 18 October 2018
- Competitors: 3 in 2 sports
- Medals: Gold 0 Silver 0 Bronze 0 Total 0

Summer Youth Olympics appearances
- 2010; 2014; 2018

Seychelles participated at the 2018 Summer Youth Olympics in Buenos Aires, Argentina from 6 October to 18 October 2018.
