= Iceland at the 2018 Summer Youth Olympics =

- IOC code: ISL
- NOC: National Olympic and Sports Association of Iceland
- Website: http://www.olympic.is/

in Buenos Aires, Argentina 6 – 18 October 2018
- Competitors: 9 in 4 sports
- Medals Ranked 61st: Gold 1 Silver 0 Bronze 0 Total 1

Summer Youth Olympics appearances
- 2010; 2014; 2018

Iceland is participating at the 2018 Summer Youth Olympics in Buenos Aires, Argentina from 6 October to 18 October 2018.

== Golf ==
Iceland received a quota of two athletes to compete by the tripartite committee.

Individual

Athlete	Event	Round 1		Round 2			Round 3			Total		
Athlete	Event	Score	Rank	Score	Total	Rank	Score	Total	Rank	Score	Par	Rank
Hulda Clara Gestsdottir	Girls' Individual	81 (+11)	25	82 (+12)	163	29	82 (+12)	245	30	245	+35	29
Ingvar Andri Magnusson	Boys' Individual	74 (+4)	16	73 (+3)	147	12	71 (+1)	218	6	218	+8	9

Team

Athletes	Event	Round 1 (Fourball)		Round 2 (Foursome)		Round 3 (Individual Stroke)				Total		
Athletes	Event	Score	Rank	Score	Rank	Girl	Boy	Total	Rank	Score	Par	Rank
Hulda Clara Gestsdottir; Ingvar Andri Magnusson	Mixed team	68 (-2)	26	88 (+18)	31	77	69	146 (+6)	11	302	+22	28

== Gymnastics ==
=== Artistic ===
Iceland was given a quota to compete by the tripartite committee.

- Boys' artistic individual all-around - 1 quota
