= 2025 Intermarché–Wanty season =

Intermarché–Wanty
- 2025 season
- UCI code: IWA
- Status: UCI WorldTeam
- Manager: Jean-François Bourlart (BEL)
- Main sponsor(s): Intermarché; Wanty
- Based: Belgium
- Bicycles: Cube
- Groupset: Shimano

Season victories
- One-day races: 1
- Stage race overall: 1
- National Championships: 1
- Most wins: (Germany) Georg Zimmermann (2)

The 2025 season for Intermarché–Wanty was the 18th season in the team's existence, and its fifth as a UCI WorldTeam. It was the team's final season, as it merged with Lotto to form Lotto–Intermarché for the 2026 season onwards.

== Team roster ==
All ages are as of 1 January 2025, the first day of the 2025 season.

As of 7 January 2025.

Rider	Date of birth
Huub Artz (NED)	14 May 2002 (aged 22)
Louis Barré (FRA)	6 April 2000 (aged 24)
Kamiel Bonneu (BEL)	1 August 1999 (aged 25)
Vito Braet (BEL)	2 November 2000 (aged 24)
Francesco Busatto (ITA)	1 November 2002 (aged 22)
Kevin Colleoni (ITA)	11 November 1999 (aged 25)
Dries De Pooter (BEL)	8 November 2002 (aged 22)
Alexy Faure Prost (FRA)	22 April 2004 (aged 20)
Biniam Girmay (ERI)	2 April 2000 (aged 24)
Kobe Goossens (BEL)	29 April 1996 (aged 28)
Alexander Kamp (DEN)	14 December 1993 (aged 31)
Gerben Kuypers (BEL)	1 February 2000 (aged 24)
Arne Marit (BEL)	21 January 1999 (aged 25)
Louis Meintjes (RSA)	21 February 1992 (aged 32)

Rider	Date of birth
Hugo Page (FRA)	24 July 2001 (aged 23)
Tom Paquot (BEL)	22 September 1999 (aged 25)
Simone Petilli (ITA)	4 May 1993 (aged 31)
Adrien Petit (FRA)	26 September 1990 (aged 34)
Laurenz Rex (BEL)	15 December 1999 (aged 25)
Lorenzo Rota (ITA)	23 May 1995 (aged 29)
Jonas Rutsch (GER)	24 January 1998 (aged 26)
Dion Smith (NZL)	3 March 1993 (aged 31)
Gerben Thijssen (BEL)	21 June 1998 (aged 26)
Luca Van Boven (BEL)	6 January 2000 (aged 24)
Taco van der Hoorn (NED)	4 December 1993 (aged 31)
Gijs Van Hoecke (BEL)	12 November 1991 (aged 33)
Roel van Sintmaartensdijk (NED)	8 May 2001 (aged 23)
Georg Zimmermann (GER)	11 October 1997 (aged 27)

== Season victories ==
Date	Race	Competition	Rider	Country	Location	Ref.
5 April	Volta Limburg Classic	UCI Europe Tour	Dion Smith (NZL)	Netherlands	Eijsden	
18 April	Giro d'Abruzzo, overall	UCI Europe Tour	Georg Zimmermann (GER)	Italy	Abruzzo	

== National, Continental, and World Champions ==
Date	Discipline	Jersey	Rider	Country	Location	Ref.
29 June	German National Road Race Championships		Georg Zimmermann (GER)	Germany	Linden	
