= 2024 Tour of Oman =

Omani cycling race

2024 UCI ProSeries

Race details
- Dates: 10–14 February 2024
- Stages: 5
- Distance: 604 km (375 mi)
- Winning time: 14h 22' 30"

Results
| Jersey awarded to the overall winner | Winner | Adam Yates (GBR) | (UAE Team Emirates) |
| | Second | Jan Hirt (CZE) | (Soudal–Quick-Step) |
| | Third | Finn Fisher-Black (NZL) | (UAE Team Emirates) |
| Jersey awarded to the points classification winner | Points | Finn Fisher-Black (NZL) | (UAE Team Emirates) |
| Jersey awarded to the young rider classification winner | Young rider | Finn Fisher-Black (NZL) | (UAE Team Emirates) |
| Jersey awarded to the sprints classification winner | Sprints | Óscar Pelegri (ESP) | (Burgos BH) |
| | Team | (United Arab Emirates) UAE Team Emirates | |

The 2024 Tour of Oman was a road cycling stage race that took place between 10 and 14 February 2024 in Oman. The race was rated as a category 2. Pro event on the 2024 UCI ProSeries calendar, and was the 13th edition of the Tour of Oman.

== Teams ==
Nine of the 18 UCI WorldTeams, four UCI ProTeams, three UCI Continentalteams, and the Omani national team made up the 17 teams that participated in the race.

UCI WorldTeams

- Arkéa–B&B Hotels
- Astana Qazaqstan Team
- Bora–Hansgrohe
- Cofidis
- Intermarché–Wanty
- Soudal–Quick-Step
- Team dsm–firmenich PostNL
- Team Jayco–AlUla
- UAE Team Emirates

UCI ProTeams

- Burgos BH
- Equipo Kern Pharma
- Lotto–Dstny
- Uno-X Mobility

UCI Continental Teams

- JCL Team UKYO
- Roojai Insurance
- Terengganu Cycling Team

National Teams

- Oman

== Route ==
Stage characteristics and winners
| Stage | Date | Course | Distance | Type | Stage winner |
|---|---|---|---|---|---|
| 1 | 10 February | Oman Across Ages Museum to Oman Convention and Exhibition Centre (OCEC) | 181.5 km (112.8 mi) | Flat stage | Caleb Ewan (AUS) |
| 2 | 11 February | As Sifah to Qurayyat | 170.5 km (105.9 mi) | Hilly stage | Finn Fisher-Black (NZL) |
| 3 | 12 February | ~~Bid Bid~~ Naseem Garden to ~~Eastern Mountain~~ Al Bustan | ~~169.5 km (105.3 mi)~~ 76 km (47 mi) | Hilly stage | Paul Magnier (FRA) |
| 4 | 13 February | ~~Al Rustaq Fort~~ Fanja to Yitti Hills | ~~207.5 km (128.9 mi)~~ 104 km (65 mi) | Hilly stage | Amaury Capiot (BEL) |
| 5 | 14 February | ~~Imty~~ Samail to Jabal al Akhdhar (Green Mountain) | ~~139 km (86 mi)~~ 72 km (45 mi) | Mountain stage | Adam Yates (GBR) |
| Total | | | 604 km (375 mi) | | |

== Stages ==
=== Stage 1 ===
10 February 2024 — Oman Across Ages Museum to Oman Convention and Exhibition Centre (OCEC), 181.5 km (112.8 mi)

Stage 1 Result (1–10)
| Rank | Rider | Team | Time |
|---|---|---|---|
| 1 | Caleb Ewan (AUS) | Team Jayco–AlUla | 4h 23' 28" |
| 2 | Bryan Coquard (FRA) | Cofidis | + 0" |
| 3 | Alexander Kristoff (NOR) | Uno-X Mobility | + 0" |
| 4 | Gleb Syritsa | Astana Qazaqstan Team | + 0" |
| 5 | Paul Magnier (FRA) | Soudal–Quick-Step | + 0" |
| 6 | Amaury Capiot (BEL) | Arkéa–B&B Hotels | + 0" |
| 7 | Dries De Pooter (BEL) | Intermarché–Wanty | + 0" |
| 8 | Matteo Malucelli (ITA) | JCL Team UKYO | + 0" |
| 9 | Marc Brustenga (ESP) | Equipo Kern Pharma | + 0" |
| 10 | Fabio Jakobsen (NED) | Team dsm–firmenich PostNL | + 0" |

General classification after Stage 1 (1–10)
| Rank | Rider | Team | Time |
|---|---|---|---|
| 1 | Caleb Ewan (AUS) | Team Jayco–AlUla | 4h 23' 18" |
| 2 | Bryan Coquard (FRA) | Cofidis | + 4" |
| 3 | Óscar Pelegri (ESP) | Burgos BH | + 5" |
| 4 | Polychronis Tzortzakis (GRE) | Roojai Insurance | + 5" |
| 5 | Alexander Kristoff (NOR) | Uno-X Mobility | + 6" |
| 6 | Gleb Syritsa | Astana Qazaqstan Team | + 10" |
| 7 | Paul Magnier (FRA) | Soudal–Quick-Step | + 10" |
| 8 | Amaury Capiot (BEL) | Arkéa–B&B Hotels | + 10" |
| 9 | Dries De Pooter (BEL) | Intermarché–Wanty | + 10" |
| 10 | Matteo Malucelli (ITA) | JCL Team UKYO | + 10" |

=== Stage 2 ===
11 February 2024 — As Sifah to Qurayyat, 170.5 km (105.9 mi)

Stage 2 Result (1–10)
| Rank | Rider | Team | Time |
|---|---|---|---|
| 1 | Finn Fisher-Black (NZL) | UAE Team Emirates | 4h 04' 04" |
| 2 | Luke Lamperti (USA) | Soudal–Quick-Step | + 2" |
| 3 | Diego Ulissi (ITA) | UAE Team Emirates | + 2" |
| 4 | Anthon Charmig (DEN) | Astana Qazaqstan Team | + 2" |
| 5 | Roger Adrià (ESP) | Bora–Hansgrohe | + 2" |
| 6 | Adam Yates (GBR) | UAE Team Emirates | + 2" |
| 7 | Mauri Vansevenant (BEL) | Soudal–Quick-Step | + 2" |
| 8 | Jenno Berckmoes (BEL) | Lotto–Dstny | + 2" |
| 9 | Alessandro Verre (ITA) | Arkéa–B&B Hotels | + 6" |
| 10 | Davide De Pretto (ITA) | Team Jayco–AlUla | + 6" |

General classification after Stage 2 (1–10)
| Rank | Rider | Team | Time |
|---|---|---|---|
| 1 | Finn Fisher-Black (NZL) | UAE Team Emirates | 8h 27' 22" |
| 2 | Luke Lamperti (USA) | Soudal–Quick-Step | + 6" |
| 3 | Diego Ulissi (ITA) | UAE Team Emirates | + 8" |
| 4 | Roger Adrià (ESP) | Bora–Hansgrohe | + 12" |
| 5 | Anthon Charmig (DEN) | Astana Qazaqstan Team | + 12" |
| 6 | Adam Yates (GBR) | UAE Team Emirates | + 12" |
| 7 | Jenno Berckmoes (BEL) | Lotto–Dstny | + 12" |
| 8 | Mauri Vansevenant (BEL) | Soudal–Quick-Step | + 12" |
| 9 | Ben Zwiehoff (GER) | Bora–Hansgrohe | + 16" |
| 10 | Thomas Pesenti (ITA) | JCL Team UKYO | + 16" |

=== Stage 3 ===
12 February 2024 — ~~Bid Bid~~ Naseem Garden to ~~Eastern Mountain~~ Al Bustan, 76 km (47 mi)

Stage 3 Result (1–10)
| Rank | Rider | Team | Time |
|---|---|---|---|
| 1 | Paul Magnier (FRA) | Soudal–Quick-Step | 1h 47' 54" |
| 2 | Luke Lamperti (USA) | Soudal–Quick-Step | + 0" |
| 3 | Bryan Coquard (FRA) | Cofidis | + 0" |
| 4 | Dries De Pooter (BEL) | Intermarché–Wanty | + 0" |
| 5 | Roger Adrià (ESP) | Bora–Hansgrohe | + 0" |
| 6 | Yevgeniy Gidich (KAZ) | Astana Qazaqstan Team | + 0" |
| 7 | Jenno Berckmoes (BEL) | Lotto–Dstny | + 0" |
| 8 | Lionel Taminiaux (BEL) | Lotto–Dstny | + 0" |
| 9 | Alexander Kristoff (NOR) | Uno-X Mobility | + 0" |
| 10 | Finn Fisher-Black (NZL) | UAE Team Emirates | + 0" |

General classification after Stage 3 (1–10)
| Rank | Rider | Team | Time |
|---|---|---|---|
| 1 | Luke Lamperti (USA) | Soudal–Quick-Step | 10h 15' 16" |
| 2 | Finn Fisher-Black (NZL) | UAE Team Emirates | + 0" |
| 3 | Diego Ulissi (ITA) | UAE Team Emirates | + 8" |
| 4 | Roger Adrià (ESP) | Bora–Hansgrohe | + 12" |
| 5 | Jenno Berckmoes (BEL) | Lotto–Dstny | + 12" |
| 6 | Adam Yates (GBR) | UAE Team Emirates | + 12" |
| 7 | Anthon Charmig (DEN) | Astana Qazaqstan Team | + 12" |
| 8 | Mauri Vansevenant (BEL) | Soudal–Quick-Step | + 12" |
| 9 | Ben Zwiehoff (GER) | Bora–Hansgrohe | + 16" |
| 10 | Thomas Pesenti (ITA) | JCL Team UKYO | + 16" |

=== Stage 4 ===
13 February 2024 — ~~Al Rustaq Fort~~ Fanja to Yitti Hills, 104 km (65 mi)

Stage 4 Result (1–10)
| Rank | Rider | Team | Time |
|---|---|---|---|
| 1 | Amaury Capiot (BEL) | Arkéa–B&B Hotels | 2h 17' 35" |
| 2 | Ide Schelling (NED) | Bora–Hansgrohe | + 0" |
| 3 | Davide De Pretto (ITA) | Team Jayco–AlUla | + 0" |
| 4 | Jesús Herrada (ESP) | Cofidis | + 0" |
| 5 | Lorenzo Rota (ITA) | Intermarché–Wanty | + 0" |
| 6 | Roger Adrià (ESP) | Bora–Hansgrohe | + 0" |
| 7 | Thomas Pesenti (ITA) | JCL Team UKYO | + 0" |
| 8 | Cristián Rodríguez (ESP) | Arkéa–B&B Hotels | + 0" |
| 9 | Iván Cobo (ESP) | Equipo Kern Pharma | + 0" |
| 10 | Ben Zwiehoff (GER) | Bora–Hansgrohe | + 0" |

General classification after Stage 4 (1–10)
| Rank | Rider | Team | Time |
|---|---|---|---|
| 1 | Finn Fisher-Black (NZL) | UAE Team Emirates | 12h 32' 48" |
| 2 | Luke Lamperti (USA) | Soudal–Quick-Step | + 3" |
| 3 | Diego Ulissi (ITA) | UAE Team Emirates | + 9" |
| 4 | Anthon Charmig (DEN) | Astana Qazaqstan Team | + 14" |
| 5 | Roger Adrià (ESP) | Bora–Hansgrohe | + 15" |
| 6 | Jenno Berckmoes (BEL) | Lotto–Dstny | + 15" |
| 7 | Davide De Pretto (ITA) | Team Jayco–AlUla | + 15" |
| 8 | Adam Yates (GBR) | UAE Team Emirates | + 15" |
| 9 | Mauri Vansevenant (BEL) | Soudal–Quick-Step | + 15" |
| 10 | Ben Zwiehoff (GER) | Bora–Hansgrohe | + 19" |

=== Stage 5 ===
14 February 2024 — ~~Imty~~ Samail to Jabal al Akhdhar (Green Mountain), 72 km (45 mi)

Stage 5 Result (1–10)
| Rank | Rider | Team | Time |
|---|---|---|---|
| 1 | Adam Yates (GBR) | UAE Team Emirates | 1h 49' 37" |
| 2 | Jan Hirt (CZE) | Soudal–Quick-Step | + 11" |
| 3 | Huub Artz (NED) | Intermarché–Wanty | + 29" |
| 4 | Cristián Rodríguez (ESP) | Arkéa–B&B Hotels | + 34" |
| 5 | Diego Ulissi (ITA) | UAE Team Emirates | + 40" |
| 6 | Finn Fisher-Black (NZL) | UAE Team Emirates | + 44" |
| 7 | Warren Barguil (FRA) | Team dsm–firmenich PostNL | + 1' 01" |
| 8 | Mauri Vansevenant (BEL) | Soudal–Quick-Step | + 1' 06" |
| 9 | Johannes Kulset (NOR) | Uno-X Mobility | + 1' 10" |
| 10 | Iván Cobo (ESP) | Equipo Kern Pharma | + 1' 13" |

General classification after Stage 5 (1–10)
| Rank | Rider | Team | Time |
|---|---|---|---|
| 1 | Adam Yates (GBR) | UAE Team Emirates | 14h 22' 30" |
| 2 | Jan Hirt (CZE) | Soudal–Quick-Step | + 19" |
| 3 | Finn Fisher-Black (NZL) | UAE Team Emirates | + 39" |
| 4 | Diego Ulissi (ITA) | UAE Team Emirates | + 44" |
| 5 | Cristián Rodríguez (ESP) | Arkéa–B&B Hotels | + 54" |
| 6 | Warren Barguil (FRA) | Team dsm–firmenich PostNL | + 1' 15" |
| 7 | Mauri Vansevenant (BEL) | Soudal–Quick-Step | + 1' 16" |
| 8 | Johannes Kulset (NOR) | Uno-X Mobility | + 1' 27" |
| 9 | Iván Cobo (ESP) | Equipo Kern Pharma | + 1' 30" |
| 10 | Alexy Faure Prost (FRA) | Intermarché–Wanty | + 1' 33" |

== Classification leadership table ==
Classification leadership by stage
| Stage | Winner | General classification | Points classification | Active rider classification | Young rider classification | Team classification |
|---|---|---|---|---|---|---|
| 1 | Caleb Ewan | Caleb Ewan | Caleb Ewan | Óscar Pelegri | Gleb Syritsa | Burgos BH |
| 2 | Finn Fisher-Black | Finn Fisher-Black | Finn Fisher-Black | Óscar Pelegri | Finn Fisher-Black | UAE Team Emirates |
| 3 | Paul Magnier | Luke Lamperti | Luke Lamperti | Óscar Pelegri | Luke Lamperti | UAE Team Emirates |
| 4 | Amaury Capiot | Finn Fisher-Black | Luke Lamperti | Óscar Pelegri | Finn Fisher-Black | UAE Team Emirates |
| 5 | Adam Yates | Adam Yates | Finn Fisher-Black | Óscar Pelegri | Finn Fisher-Black | UAE Team Emirates |
| Final | | Adam Yates | Finn Fisher-Black | Óscar Pelegri | Finn Fisher-Black | UAE Team Emirates |

== Classification standings ==
Legend
| Denotes the winner of the general classification | Denotes the winner of the active rider classification |
| Denotes the winner of the points classification | Denotes the winner of the young rider classification |

=== General classification ===
Final general classification (1–10)
| Rank | Rider | Team | Time |
|---|---|---|---|
| 1 | Adam Yates (GBR) | UAE Team Emirates | 14h 22' 30" |
| 2 | Jan Hirt (CZE) | Soudal–Quick-Step | + 19" |
| 3 | Finn Fisher-Black (NZL) | UAE Team Emirates | + 39" |
| 4 | Diego Ulissi (ITA) | UAE Team Emirates | + 44" |
| 5 | Cristián Rodríguez (ESP) | Arkéa–B&B Hotels | + 54" |
| 6 | Warren Barguil (FRA) | Team dsm–firmenich PostNL | + 1' 15" |
| 7 | Mauri Vansevenant (BEL) | Soudal–Quick-Step | + 1' 16" |
| 8 | Johannes Kulset (NOR) | Uno-X Mobility | + 1' 27" |
| 9 | Iván Cobo (ESP) | Equipo Kern Pharma | + 1' 30" |
| 10 | Alexy Faure Prost (FRA) | Intermarché–Wanty | + 1' 33" |

=== Points classification ===
Final points classification (1–10)
| Rank | Rider | Team | Points |
|---|---|---|---|
| 1 | Finn Fisher-Black (NZL) | UAE Team Emirates | 24 |
| 2 | Luke Lamperti (USA) | Soudal–Quick-Step | 24 |
| 3 | Paul Magnier (FRA) | Soudal–Quick-Step | 21 |
| 4 | Bryan Coquard (FRA) | Cofidis | 21 |
| 5 | Adam Yates (GBR) | UAE Team Emirates | 20 |
| 6 | Amaury Capiot (BEL) | Arkéa–B&B Hotels | 20 |
| 7 | Diego Ulissi (ITA) | UAE Team Emirates | 17 |
| 8 | Roger Adrià (ESP) | Bora–Hansgrohe | 17 |
| 9 | Caleb Ewan (AUS) | Team Jayco–AlUla | 15 |
| 10 | Jan Hirt (CZE) | Soudal–Quick-Step | 12 |

=== Active rider classification ===
Final active rider classification (1–10)
| Rank | Rider | Team | Points |
|---|---|---|---|
| 1 | Óscar Pelegri (ESP) | Burgos BH | 17 |
| 2 | Tegshbayar Batsaikhan (MGL) | Roojai Insurance | 11 |
| 3 | Finn Fisher-Black (NZL) | UAE Team Emirates | 6 |
| 4 | Blake Quick (AUS) | Team Jayco–AlUla | 5 |
| 5 | Polychronis Tzortzakis (GRE) | Roojai Insurance | 5 |
| 6 | Rasmus Bøgh Wallin (DEN) | Uno-X Mobility | 5 |
| 7 | Nariyuki Masuda (JPN) | JCL Team UKYO | 4 |
| 8 | Adam Yates (GBR) | UAE Team Emirates | 3 |
| 9 | Nathan Earle (AUS) | JCL Team UKYO | 3 |
| 10 | Diego Ulissi (ITA) | UAE Team Emirates | 3 |

=== Young rider classification ===
Final young rider classification (1–10)
| Rank | Rider | Team | Time |
|---|---|---|---|
| 1 | Finn Fisher-Black (NZL) | UAE Team Emirates | 14h 23' 09" |
| 2 | Mauri Vansevenant (BEL) | Soudal–Quick-Step | + 37" |
| 3 | Johannes Kulset (NOR) | Uno-X Mobility | + 48" |
| 4 | Iván Cobo (ESP) | Equipo Kern Pharma | + 51" |
| 5 | Alexy Faure Prost (FRA) | Intermarché–Wanty | + 54" |
| 6 | Jenno Berckmoes (BEL) | Lotto–Dstny | + 1' 13" |
| 7 | Alessandro Verre (ITA) | Arkéa–B&B Hotels | + 1' 17" |
| 8 | Emil Herzog (GER) | Bora–Hansgrohe | + 1' 42" |
| 9 | Embret Svestad-Bårdseng (NOR) | Arkéa–B&B Hotels | + 1' 46" |
| 10 | Thomas Pesenti (ITA) | JCL Team UKYO | + 2' 00" |

=== Team classification ===
Final team classification (1–10)
| Rank | Team | Time |
|---|---|---|
| 1 | (United Arab Emirates) UAE Team Emirates | 43h 09' 22" |
| 2 | (Belgium) Soudal–Quick-Step | + 1' 50" |
| 3 | (Belgium) Intermarché–Wanty | + 2' 38" |
| 4 | (France) Arkéa–B&B Hotels | + 3' 23" |
| 5 | (Germany) Bora–Hansgrohe | + 4' 14" |
| 6 | (Japan) JCL Team UKYO | + 6' 04" |
| 7 | (Spain) Equipo Kern Pharma | + 7' 07" |
| 8 | (Belgium) Lotto–Dstny | + 8' 09" |
| 9 | (Norway) Uno-X Mobility | + 8' 34" |
| 10 | (Spain) Burgos BH | + 9' 13" |
