= 2023 Giro di Sicilia =

2023 UCI Europe Tour

Race details
- Dates: 11–14 April 2023
- Stages: 4
- Distance: 718 km (446 mi)

Results
Jersey awarded to the overall winner	Winner	Alexey Lutsenko (KAZ)	(Astana Qazaqstan Team)
	Second	Louis Meintjes (RSA)	(Green Project–Bardiani–CSF–Faizanè)
	Third	Vincenzo Albanese (ITA)	(Eolo–Kometa)
Jersey awarded to the points classification winner	Points	Vincenzo Albanese (ITA)	(Eolo–Kometa)
Jersey awarded to the mountains classification winner	Mountains	Alexis Guérin (FRA)	(Bingoal WB)
Jersey awarded to the young rider classification winner	Young rider	Finn Fisher-Black (NZL)	(UAE Team Emirates)
	Team	Intermarché–Circus–Wanty	

The 2023 Giro di Sicilia is a road cycling stage race that took place between 11 and 14 April 2023 on the island of Sicily in Italy. The race is rated as a category 2.1 event on the 2023 UCI Europe Tour calendar, and is the 27th edition of the Giro di Sicilia.

== Teams ==
Five of the 18 UCI WorldTeams, eight UCI ProTeams, eleven UCI Continental teams and one national team make up the 25 teams that are participating in the race. Each team entered a full squad of seven riders except for teams Biesse–Carrera, Intermarché–Circus–Wanty, Q36.5 Pro Cycling Team, Team Colpack–Ballan–CSB, Team Technipes #inEmiliaRomagna, UAE Team Emirates and Zalf Euromobil Fior with 6 riders and Team Bahrain Victorious with 5 riders, for a total of 166 riders who started the race.

UCI WorldTeams

- Astana Qazaqstan Team
- Team Bahrain Victorious
- Intermarché–Circus–Wanty
- Team Jayco–AlUla
- UAE Team Emirates

UCI ProTeams

- Bingoal WB
- Eolo–Kometa
- Green Project–Bardiani–CSF–Faizanè
- Human Powered Health
- Q36.5 Pro Cycling Team
- Team Corratec
- Team Novo Nordisk
- Tudor Pro Cycling Team

UCI Continental Teams

- Beltrami TSA–Tre Colli
- Biesse–Carrera
- D'Amico–UM Tools
- General Store–Essegibi–Fratelli Curia
- GW Shimano–Sidermec
- MG.K Vis Colors for Peace
- Sofer–Savini Due–OMZ
- Team Colpack–Ballan–CSB
- Team Technipes #inEmiliaRomagna
- Work Service–Vitalcare–Dynatek
- Zalf Euromobil Fior

National teams

- Italy

== Route ==
Stage characteristics and winners
Stage	Date	Course	Distance	Type	Stage winner
1	11 April	Marsala to Agrigento	159 km (99 mi)	Hilly stage	Finn Fisher-Black (NZL)
2	12 April	Canicattì to Vittoria	193 km (120 mi)	Intermediate stage	Niccolò Bonifazio (ITA)
3	13 April	Enna to Termini Imerese	150 km (93 mi)	Intermediate stage	Joel Suter (SUI)
4	14 April	Barcellona Pozzo di Gotto to Giarre	216 km (134 mi)	Mountain stage	Alexey Lutsenko (KAZ)
Total			718 km (446 mi)		

== Stages ==
=== Stage 1 ===
11 April 2023 – Marsala to Agrigento, 159 km (99 mi)

Stage 1 Result
Rank	Rider	Team	Time
1	Finn Fisher-Black (NZL)	UAE Team Emirates	3h 24' 07"
2	Vincenzo Albanese (ITA)	Eolo–Kometa	+ 8"
3	Diego Ulissi (ITA)	UAE Team Emirates	+ 8"
4	Damiano Caruso (ITA)	Team Bahrain Victorious	+ 8"
5	Alexey Lutsenko (KAZ)	Astana Qazaqstan Team	+ 8"
6	Valerio Conti (ITA)	Team Corratec	+ 8"
7	Thomas Pesenti (ITA)	Beltrami TSA–Tre Colli	+ 8"
8	Lennert Teugels (BEL)	Bingoal WB	+ 8"
9	George Bennett (NZL)	UAE Team Emirates	+ 8"
10	Kobe Goossens (BEL)	Intermarché–Circus–Wanty	+ 8"

General classification after Stage 1
Rank	Rider	Team	Time
1	Finn Fisher-Black (NZL)	UAE Team Emirates	3h 23' 57"
2	Vincenzo Albanese (ITA)	Eolo–Kometa	+ 12"
3	Diego Ulissi (ITA)	UAE Team Emirates	+ 14"
4	Damiano Caruso (ITA)	Team Bahrain Victorious	+ 18"
5	Alexey Lutsenko (KAZ)	Astana Qazaqstan Team	+ 18"
6	Valerio Conti (ITA)	Team Corratec	+ 18"
7	Thomas Pesenti (ITA)	Beltrami TSA–Tre Colli	+ 18"
8	Lennert Teugels (BEL)	Bingoal WB	+ 18"
9	George Bennett (NZL)	UAE Team Emirates	+ 18"
10	Kobe Goossens (BEL)	Intermarché–Circus–Wanty	+ 18"

=== Stage 2 ===
12 April 2023 – Canicattì to Vittoria, 193 km (120 mi)

Stage 2 Result
Rank	Rider	Team	Time
1	Niccolò Bonifazio (ITA)	Intermarché–Circus–Wanty	4h 28' 37"
2	Vincenzo Albanese (ITA)	Eolo–Kometa	+ 0"
3	Blake Quick (AUS)	Team Jayco–AlUla	+ 0"
4	Filippo Fiorelli (ITA)	Green Project–Bardiani–CSF–Faizanè	+ 0"
5	Damiano Caruso (ITA)	Team Bahrain Victorious	+ 0"
6	Andrea D'Amato (ITA)	Biesse–Carrera	+ 0"
7	Cameron Scott (AUS)	Team Bahrain Victorious	+ 0"
8	Álvaro José Hodeg (COL)	UAE Team Emirates	+ 0"
9	Alessandro Motta (ITA)	Biesse–Carrera	+ 0"
10	Tom Portsmouth (GBR)	Bingoal WB	+ 0"

General classification after Stage 2
Rank	Rider	Team	Time
1	Finn Fisher-Black (NZL)	UAE Team Emirates	7h 52' 34"
2	Vincenzo Albanese (ITA)	Eolo–Kometa	+ 6"
3	Diego Ulissi (ITA)	UAE Team Emirates	+ 14"
4	Damiano Caruso (ITA)	Team Bahrain Victorious	+ 18"
5	Thomas Pesenti (ITA)	Beltrami TSA–Tre Colli	+ 18"
6	Valerio Conti (ITA)	Team Corratec	+ 18"
7	Kobe Goossens (BEL)	Intermarché–Circus–Wanty	+ 18"
8	Walter Calzoni (ITA)	Q36.5 Pro Cycling Team	+ 18"
9	Alexey Lutsenko (KAZ)	Astana Qazaqstan Team	+ 18"
10	Kevin Colleoni (ITA)	Team Jayco–AlUla	+ 18"

=== Stage 3 ===
13 April 2023 – Enna to Termini Imerese, 150 km (93 mi)

Stage 3 Result
Rank	Rider	Team	Time
1	Joel Suter (SUI)	Tudor Pro Cycling Team	3h 33' 14"
2	Filippo Fiorelli (ITA)	Green Project–Bardiani–CSF–Faizanè	+ 4"
3	Elia Viviani (ITA)	Italy	+ 4"
4	Giosuè Epis (ITA)	Zalf Euromobil Fior	+ 4"
5	Vincenzo Albanese (ITA)	Eolo–Kometa	+ 4"
6	Luc Wirtgen (LUX)	Tudor Pro Cycling Team	+ 4"
7	Niccolò Bonifazio (ITA)	Intermarché–Circus–Wanty	+ 4"
8	Nikiforos Arvanitou (GRE)	Sofer–Savini Due–OMZ	+ 4"
9	Kevin Colleoni (ITA)	Team Jayco–AlUla	+ 4"
10	Diego Ulissi (ITA)	UAE Team Emirates	+ 4"

General classification after Stage 3
Rank	Rider	Team	Time
1	Finn Fisher-Black (NZL)	UAE Team Emirates	11h 25' 52"
2	Vincenzo Albanese (ITA)	Eolo–Kometa	+ 6"
3	Diego Ulissi (ITA)	UAE Team Emirates	+ 14"
4	Alexey Lutsenko (KAZ)	Astana Qazaqstan Team	+ 18"
5	Walter Calzoni (ITA)	Q36.5 Pro Cycling Team	+ 18"
6	Kobe Goossens (BEL)	Intermarché–Circus–Wanty	+ 18"
7	Kevin Colleoni (ITA)	Team Jayco–AlUla	+ 18"
8	Valerio Conti (ITA)	Team Corratec	+ 18"
9	Damiano Caruso (ITA)	Team Bahrain Victorious	+ 18"
10	Thomas Pesenti (ITA)	Beltrami TSA–Tre Colli	+ 18"

=== Stage 4 ===
14 April 2023 – Barcellona Pozzo di Gotto to Giarre, 216 km (134 mi)

Stage 4 Result
Rank	Rider	Team	Time
1	Alexey Lutsenko (KAZ)	Astana Qazaqstan Team	5h 29' 50"
2	Louis Meintjes (RSA)	Green Project–Bardiani–CSF–Faizanè	+ 40"
3	Vincenzo Albanese (ITA)	Eolo–Kometa	+ 1' 13"
4	Yannis Voisard (SUI)	Tudor Pro Cycling Team	+ 1' 13"
5	Kobe Goossens (BEL)	Intermarché–Circus–Wanty	+ 1' 13"
6	Mark Donovan (GBR)	Q36.5 Pro Cycling Team	+ 1' 13"
7	Simone Petilli (ITA)	Intermarché–Circus–Wanty	+ 1' 15"
8	Finn Fisher-Black (NZL)	UAE Team Emirates	+ 1' 15"
9	Rafal Majka (POL)	UAE Team Emirates	+ 1' 24"
10	Samuele Zoccarato (ITA)	Green Project–Bardiani–CSF–Faizanè	+ 2' 52"

General classification after Stage 4
Rank	Rider	Team	Time
1	Alexey Lutsenko (KAZ)	Astana Qazaqstan Team	16h 55' 50"
2	Louis Meintjes (RSA)	Green Project–Bardiani–CSF–Faizanè	+ 44"
3	Vincenzo Albanese (ITA)	Eolo–Kometa	+ 1' 07"
4	Finn Fisher-Black (NZL)	UAE Team Emirates	+ 1' 07"
5	Mark Donovan (GBR)	Q36.5 Pro Cycling Team	+ 1' 20"
6	Kobe Goossens (BEL)	Intermarché–Circus–Wanty	+ 1' 21"
7	Yannis Voisard (SUI)	Tudor Pro Cycling Team	+ 1' 23"
8	Simone Petilli (ITA)	Intermarché–Circus–Wanty	+ 1' 25"
9	Rafal Majka (POL)	UAE Team Emirates	+ 1' 34"
10	Damiano Caruso (ITA)	Team Bahrain Victorious	+ 3' 02"

== Classification leadership table ==
Classification leadership by stage
Stage	Winner	General classification	Points classification	Mountains classification	Young rider classification	Team classification
1	Finn Fisher-Black	Finn Fisher-Black	Finn Fisher-Black	Finn Fisher-Black	Finn Fisher-Black	UAE Team Emirates
2	Niccolò Bonifazio	Finn Fisher-Black	Vincenzo Albanese	Michael Belleri	Finn Fisher-Black	UAE Team Emirates
3	Joel Suter	Finn Fisher-Black	Vincenzo Albanese	Michael Belleri	Finn Fisher-Black	UAE Team Emirates
4	Alexey Lutsenko	Alexey Lutsenko	Vincenzo Albanese	Alexis Guérin	Finn Fisher-Black	Intermarché–Circus–Wanty
Final		Alexey Lutsenko	Vincenzo Albanese	Alexis Guérin	Finn Fisher-Black	Intermarché–Circus–Wanty

== Current classification standings ==
Legend
Denotes the leader of the general classification	Denotes the leader of the mountains classification
Denotes the leader of the points classification	Denotes the leader of the young rider classification

=== General classification ===
Final general classification (1–10)
Rank	Rider	Team	Time
1	Alexey Lutsenko (KAZ)	Astana Qazaqstan Team	16h 55' 50"
2	Louis Meintjes (RSA)	Green Project–Bardiani–CSF–Faizanè	+ 44"
3	Vincenzo Albanese (ITA)	Eolo–Kometa	+ 1' 07"
4	Finn Fisher-Black (NZL)	UAE Team Emirates	+ 1' 07"
5	Mark Donovan (GBR)	Q36.5 Pro Cycling Team	+ 1' 20"
6	Kobe Goossens (BEL)	Intermarché–Circus–Wanty	+ 1' 21"
7	Yannis Voisard (SUI)	Tudor Pro Cycling Team	+ 1' 23"
8	Simone Petilli (ITA)	Intermarché–Circus–Wanty	+ 1' 25"
9	Rafal Majka (POL)	UAE Team Emirates	+ 1' 34"
10	Damiano Caruso (ITA)	Team Bahrain Victorious	+ 3' 02"

=== Points classification ===
Final points classification (1–10)
Rank	Rider	Team	Points
1	Vincenzo Albanese (ITA)	Eolo–Kometa	34
2	Alexey Lutsenko (KAZ)	Astana Qazaqstan Team	18
3	Filippo Fiorelli (ITA)	Green Project–Bardiani–CSF–Faizanè	17
4	Niccolò Bonifazio (ITA)	Intermarché–Circus–Wanty	16
5	Finn Fisher-Black (NZL)	UAE Team Emirates	15
6	Damiano Caruso (ITA)	Team Bahrain Victorious	14
7	Mark Donovan (GBR)	Q36.5 Pro Cycling Team	10
8	Louis Meintjes (RSA)	Intermarché–Circus–Wanty	10
9	Kobe Goossens (BEL)	Intermarché–Circus–Wanty	10
10	Diego Ulissi (ITA)	UAE Team Emirates	9

=== Mountains classification ===
Final mountains classification (1–10)
Rank	Rider	Team	Points
1	Alexis Guérin (FRA)	Bingoal WB	34
2	Alexey Lutsenko (KAZ)	Astana Qazaqstan Team	21
3	Bart Lemmen (NED)	Human Powered Health	20
4	Louis Meintjes (RSA)	Intermarché–Circus–Wanty	19
5	Samuele Zoccarato (ITA)	Green Project–Bardiani–CSF–Faizanè	16
6	Michael Belleri (ITA)	Biesse–Carrera	11
7	Mark Donovan (GBR)	Q36.5 Pro Cycling Team	10
8	Simone Petilli (ITA)	Intermarché–Circus–Wanty	10
9	Rainer Kepplinger (AUT)	Team Bahrain Victorious	10
10	Erik Fetter (HUN)	Eolo–Kometa	10

=== Young rider classification ===
Final young rider classification (1–10)
Rank	Rider	Team	Time
1	Finn Fisher-Black (NZL)	UAE Team Emirates	16h 56' 57"
2	Mark Donovan (GBR)	Q36.5 Pro Cycling Team	+ 13"
3	Yannis Voisard (SUI)	Tudor Pro Cycling Team	+ 16"
4	Samuele Zoccarato (ITA)	Green Project–Bardiani–CSF–Faizanè	+ 2' 49"
5	Gianmarco Garofoli (ITA)	Astana Qazaqstan Team	+ 7' 02"
6	Walter Calzoni (ITA)	Q36.5 Pro Cycling Team	+ 7' 31"
7	Thomas Pesenti (ITA)	Beltrami TSA–Tre Colli	+ 7' 31"
8	Alessandro Monaco (ITA)	Team Technipes #inEmiliaRomagna	+ 7' 41"
9	Felix Engelhardt (GER)	Team Jayco–AlUla	+ 8' 11"
10	Embret Svestad-Bårdseng (NOR)	Human Powered Health	+ 9 31"

=== Team classification ===
Final team classification (1–10)
Rank	Team	Time
1	Intermarché–Wanty–Gobert Matériaux	50h 51' 08"
2	UAE Team Emirates	+ 3' 51"
3	Q36.5 Pro Cycling Team	+ 15' 05"
4	Tudor Pro Cycling Team	+ 15' 41"
5	Green Project–Bardiani–CSF–Faizanè	+ 17' 39"
6	Astana Qazaqstan Team	+ 19' 52"
7	Human Powered Health	+ 24' 03"
8	Eolo–Kometa	+ 25' 15"
9	Team Bahrain Victorious	+ 28' 01"
10	Team Jayco–AlUla	+ 37' 06"
