= 2026 Tour de Suisse =

Swiss cycling race

2026 UCI World Tour, race 25 of 36

Race details
- Dates: 17–21 June 2026
- Stages: 5
- Distance: 633.5 km (393.6 mi)

Results
Jersey awarded to the overall winner	Winner	Tadej Pogačar (SLO)	(UAE Team Emirates XRG)
	Second	Richard Carapaz (ECU)	(EF Education–EasyPost)
	Third	Mathias Vacek (CZE)	(Lidl–Trek)
Jersey awarded to the points classification winner	Points	Tadej Pogačar (SLO)	(UAE Team Emirates XRG)
Jersey awarded to the mountains classification winner	Mountains	Louis Vervaeke (BEL)	(Soudal–Quick-Step)
Jersey awarded to the young rider classification winner	Young rider	Mathias Vacek (CZE)	(Lidl–Trek)
	Team	(United Arab Emirates) UAE Team Emirates XRG	

The 2026 Tour de Suisse was a road cycling stage race that took place between 17 and 21 June in Switzerland. It was the 89th edition of the Tour de Suisse and the 25th event of the 2026 UCI World Tour. It took place at the same time as the women's Tour de Suisse, with both races using a similar route.

The race was dominated by Slovenian rider Tadej Pogačar of UAE Team Emirates XRG, who took the lead on stage 1 after a surprise solo attack over 72 kilometres (45 mi), extended his lead on the stage 4 time trial and then took further time on the mountainous final stage to confirm his overall victory. Nearly six and a half minutes behind, Ecuadorian Richard Carapaz of EF Education–EasyPost finished second overall, with Czech rider Mathias Vacek of Lidl–Trek third overall, nearly seven minutes behind Pogačar.

In the other classifications, Pogačar won the points classification, Belgian rider Louis Vervaeke of Soudal–Quick-Step took the mountains classification, Vacek won the young rider classification and UAE Team Emirates XRG won the teams classification.

== Teams ==
All eighteen UCI WorldTeams and two UCI ProTeams made up the twenty teams that participated in the race.

UCI WorldTeams

- Alpecin–Premier Tech
- Decathlon CMA CGM
- EF Education–EasyPost
- Groupama–FDJ United
- Lidl–Trek
- Lotto–Intermarché
- Movistar Team
- Netcompany INEOS
- NSN Cycling Team
- Red Bull–Bora–Hansgrohe
- Soudal–Quick-Step
- Team Bahrain Victorious
- Team Jayco–AlUla
- Team Picnic–PostNL
- Visma–Lease a Bike
- UAE Team Emirates XRG
- Uno-X Mobility
- XDS Astana Team

UCI ProTeams

- Pinarello–Q36.5 Pro Cycling Team
- Tudor Pro Cycling Team

== Route ==
Due to reduced budget and logistical issues, the route was shortened to 5 days, and stages were designed to start and finish in the same town.

Stage characteristics and winners
Stage	Date	Route	Distance	Type	Winner
1	17 June	Sondrio (Italy) to Sondrio (Italy)	144 km (89 mi)	Hilly stage	Tadej Pogačar (SLO)
2	18 June	Locarno to Locarno	157.7 km (98.0 mi)	Hilly stage	Romain Grégoire (FRA)
3	19 June	Bad Ragaz to Bad Ragaz	157.4 km (97.8 mi)	Hilly stage	Jhonatan Narváez (ECU)
4	20 June	Aarburg to Aarburg	23.7 km (14.7 mi)	Individual time trial	Tadej Pogačar (SLO)
5	21 June	Villars-sur-Ollon to Villars-sur-Ollon	150.7 km (93.6 mi)	Mountain stage	Tadej Pogačar (SLO)
Total			633.5 km (393.6 mi)		

== Stages ==
=== Stage 1 ===
17 June 2026 — Sondrio (Italy) to Sondrio (Italy), 144 km (89 mi)

Stage 1 Result
Rank	Rider	Team	Time
1	Tadej Pogačar (SLO)	UAE Team Emirates XRG	3h 28' 51"
2	Richard Carapaz (ECU)	EF Education–EasyPost	+ 2' 14"
3	Andrea Bagioli (ITA)	Lidl–Trek	+ 2' 29"
4	Ilan Van Wilder (BEL)	Soudal–Quick-Step	+ 4' 02"
5	Mathias Vacek (CZE)	Lidl–Trek	+ 4' 02"
6	Brandon McNulty (USA)	UAE Team Emirates XRG	+ 4' 02"
7	Wilco Kelderman (NED)	Visma–Lease a Bike	+ 4' 02"
8	Felix Großschartner (AUT)	UAE Team Emirates XRG	+ 4' 05"
9	Andrew August (USA)	Netcompany INEOS	+ 4' 30"
10	Jhonatan Narváez (ECU)	UAE Team Emirates XRG	+ 4' 30"

General classification after Stage 1
Rank	Rider	Team	Time
1	Tadej Pogačar (SLO)	UAE Team Emirates XRG	3h 28' 37"
2	Richard Carapaz (ECU)	EF Education–EasyPost	+ 2' 22"
3	Andrea Bagioli (ITA)	Lidl–Trek	+ 2' 39"
4	Ilan Van Wilder (BEL)	Soudal–Quick-Step	+ 4' 16"
5	Mathias Vacek (CZE)	Lidl–Trek	+ 4' 16"
6	Brandon McNulty (USA)	UAE Team Emirates XRG	+ 4' 16"
7	Wilco Kelderman (NED)	Visma–Lease a Bike	+ 4' 16"
8	Felix Großschartner (AUT)	UAE Team Emirates XRG	+ 4' 18"
9	Matthew Riccitello (USA)	Decathlon CMA CGM	+ 4' 43"
10	Andrew August (USA)	Netcompany INEOS	+ 4' 44"

=== Stage 2 ===
18 June 2026 — Locarno to Locarno, 157.7 km (98.0 mi)

Stage 2 Result
Rank	Rider	Team	Time
1	Romain Grégoire (FRA)	Groupama–FDJ United	3h 26' 25"
2	Marcel Camprubí (ESP)	Pinarello–Q36.5 Pro Cycling Team	+ 0"
3	Bart Lemmen (NED)	Visma–Lease a Bike	+ 0"
4	Filippo Zana (ITA)	Soudal–Quick-Step	+ 0"
5	Finlay Pickering (GBR)	Team Jayco–AlUla	+ 2"
6	Mathias Vacek (CZE)	Lidl–Trek	+ 4"
7	Emiel Verstrynge (BEL)	Alpecin–Premier Tech	+ 4"
8	Tadej Pogačar (SLO)	UAE Team Emirates XRG	+ 4"
9	Afonso Eulálio (POR)	Team Bahrain Victorious	+ 9"
10	Jhonatan Narváez (ECU)	UAE Team Emirates XRG	+ 32"

General classification after Stage 2
Rank	Rider	Team	Time
1	Tadej Pogačar (SLO)	UAE Team Emirates XRG	6h 55' 06"
2	Richard Carapaz (ECU)	EF Education–EasyPost	+ 2' 50"
3	Andrea Bagioli (ITA)	Lidl–Trek	+ 3' 07"
4	Mathias Vacek (CZE)	Lidl–Trek	+ 4' 16"
5	Finlay Pickering (GBR)	Team Jayco–AlUla	+ 4' 41"
6	Ilan Van Wilder (BEL)	Soudal–Quick-Step	+ 4' 44"
7	Brandon McNulty (USA)	UAE Team Emirates XRG	+ 4' 44"
8	Wilco Kelderman (NED)	Visma–Lease a Bike	+ 4' 44"
9	Matthew Riccitello (USA)	Decathlon CMA CGM	+ 5' 11"
10	Jhonatan Narváez (ECU)	UAE Team Emirates XRG	+ 5' 12"

=== Stage 3 ===
19 June 2026 — Bad Ragaz to Bad Ragaz, 157.4 km (97.8 mi)

Stage 3 Result
Rank	Rider	Team	Time
1	Jhonatan Narváez (ECU)	UAE Team Emirates XRG	3h 34' 46"
2	Xandro Meurisse (BEL)	Pinarello–Q36.5 Pro Cycling Team	+ 0"
3	Magnus Cort (DEN)	Uno-X Mobility	+ 0"
4	Marijn van den Berg (NED)	EF Education–EasyPost	+ 0"
5	Mathieu van der Poel (NED)	Alpecin–Premier Tech	+ 0"
6	Corbin Strong (NZL)	NSN Cycling Team	+ 0"
7	Axel Laurance (FRA)	Netcompany INEOS	+ 0"
8	Michael Matthews (AUS)	Team Jayco–AlUla	+ 0"
9	Pau Miquel (ESP)	Team Bahrain Victorious	+ 0"
10	Finn Fisher-Black (NZL)	Red Bull–Bora–Hansgrohe	+ 0"

General classification after Stage 3
Rank	Rider	Team	Time
1	Tadej Pogačar (SLO)	UAE Team Emirates XRG	10h 29' 52"
2	Richard Carapaz (ECU)	EF Education–EasyPost	+ 2' 50"
3	Andrea Bagioli (ITA)	Lidl–Trek	+ 3' 07"
4	Mathias Vacek (CZE)	Lidl–Trek	+ 4' 16"
5	Finlay Pickering (GBR)	Team Jayco–AlUla	+ 4' 41"
6	Ilan Van Wilder (BEL)	Soudal–Quick-Step	+ 4' 44"
7	Brandon McNulty (USA)	UAE Team Emirates XRG	+ 4' 44"
8	Wilco Kelderman (NED)	Visma–Lease a Bike	+ 4' 44"
9	Jhonatan Narváez (ECU)	UAE Team Emirates XRG	+ 4' 57"
10	Matthew Riccitello (USA)	Decathlon CMA CGM	+ 5' 11"

=== Stage 4 ===
20 June 2026 — Aarburg to Aarburg, 23.7 km (14.7 mi) (ITT)

Stage 4 Result
Rank	Rider	Team	Time
1	Tadej Pogačar (SLO)	UAE Team Emirates XRG	26' 37"
2	Mathieu van der Poel (NED)	Alpecin–Premier Tech	+ 1"
3	Tobias Foss (NOR)	Netcompany INEOS	+ 7"
4	Mathias Vacek (CZE)	Lidl–Trek	+ 11"
5	Tim Wellens (BEL)	UAE Team Emirates XRG	+ 13"
6	Felix Großschartner (AUT)	UAE Team Emirates XRG	+ 28"
7	Sander De Pestel (BEL)	Decathlon CMA CGM	+ 28"
8	Mauro Schmid (SUI)	Team Jayco–AlUla	+ 30"
9	Brandon McNulty (USA)	UAE Team Emirates XRG	+ 32"
10	Finn Fisher-Black (NZL)	Red Bull–Bora–Hansgrohe	+ 37"

General classification after Stage 4
Rank	Rider	Team	Time
1	Tadej Pogačar (SLO)	UAE Team Emirates XRG	10h 56' 29"
2	Richard Carapaz (ECU)	EF Education–EasyPost	+ 4' 22"
3	Mathias Vacek (CZE)	Lidl–Trek	+ 4' 27"
4	Andrea Bagioli (ITA)	Lidl–Trek	+ 4' 46"
5	Brandon McNulty (USA)	UAE Team Emirates XRG	+ 5' 16"
6	Tobias Foss (NOR)	Netcompany INEOS	+ 5' 19"
7	Ilan Van Wilder (BEL)	Soudal–Quick-Step	+ 5' 34"
8	Wilco Kelderman (NED)	Visma–Lease a Bike	+ 5' 51"
9	Primož Roglič (SLO)	Red Bull–Bora–Hansgrohe	+ 6' 04"
10	Matthew Riccitello (USA)	Decathlon CMA CGM	+ 6' 43"

=== Stage 5 ===
21 June 2026 — Villars-sur-Ollon to Villars-sur-Ollon, 150.7 km (93.6 mi)

Stage 5 Result
Rank	Rider	Team	Time
1	Tadej Pogačar (SLO)	UAE Team Emirates XRG	4h 12' 24"
2	Lenny Martinez (FRA)	Team Bahrain Victorious	+ 7"
3	Bart Lemmen (NED)	Visma–Lease a Bike	+ 1' 33"
4	Jarno Widar (BEL)	Lotto–Intermarché	+ 1' 53"
5	Matthew Riccitello (USA)	Decathlon CMA CGM	+ 1' 55"
6	Enric Mas (ESP)	Movistar Team	+ 1' 55"
7	Richard Carapaz (ECU)	EF Education–EasyPost	+ 2' 00"
8	Tobias Foss (NOR)	Netcompany INEOS	+ 2' 05"
9	Ilan Van Wilder (BEL)	Soudal–Quick-Step	+ 2' 07"
10	Nairo Quintana (COL)	Movistar Team	+ 2' 12"

Final general classification
Rank	Rider	Team	Time
1	Tadej Pogačar (SLO)	UAE Team Emirates XRG	15h 08' 43"
2	Richard Carapaz (ECU)	EF Education–EasyPost	+ 6' 32"
3	Mathias Vacek (CZE)	Lidl–Trek	+ 6' 53"
4	Tobias Foss (NOR)	Netcompany INEOS	+ 7' 34"
5	Ilan Van Wilder (BEL)	Soudal–Quick-Step	+ 7' 51"
6	Brandon McNulty (USA)	UAE Team Emirates XRG	+ 7' 53"
7	Matthew Riccitello (USA)	Decathlon CMA CGM	+ 8' 48"
8	Primož Roglič (SLO)	Red Bull–Bora–Hansgrohe	+ 9' 23"
9	Sergio Higuita (COL)	XDS Astana Team	+ 9' 26"
10	Bart Lemmen (NED)	Visma–Lease a Bike	+ 9' 44"

== Classification leadership table ==
Classification leadership by stage
Stage	Winner	General classification	Points classification	Mountains classification	Young rider classification	Team classification	Combativity award
1	Tadej Pogačar	Tadej Pogačar	Tadej Pogačar (Note: On stage 2, Richard Carapaz, who was second in the points classification, wore the blue jersey, because first placed Tadej Pogačar wore the yellow jersey as leader of the general classification. On stages 3–5, Romain Grégoire wore the jersey for the same reason.)	Tadej Pogačar (Note: On stage 2, Fredrik Dversnes, who was second in the mountains classification, wore the green jersey, because first placed Tadej Pogačar wore the yellow jersey as leader of the general classification. On stage 3, Louis Vervaeke wore the jersey for the same reason.)	Mathias Vacek	UAE Team Emirates XRG	Tadej Pogačar
2	Romain Grégoire	Tadej Pogačar	Tadej Pogačar	Tadej Pogačar	Mathias Vacek	UAE Team Emirates XRG	Julian Alaphilippe
3	Jhonatan Narváez	Tadej Pogačar	Tadej Pogačar	Louis Vervaeke	Mathias Vacek	UAE Team Emirates XRG	Jhonatan Narváez
4	Tadej Pogačar	Tadej Pogačar	Tadej Pogačar	Louis Vervaeke	Mathias Vacek	UAE Team Emirates XRG	Tadej Pogačar
5	Tadej Pogačar	Tadej Pogačar	Tadej Pogačar	Louis Vervaeke	Mathias Vacek	UAE Team Emirates XRG	Mauro Schmid
Final		Tadej Pogačar	Tadej Pogačar	Louis Vervaeke	Mathias Vacek	UAE Team Emirates XRG	No winner

== Classification standings ==
Legend
Denotes the winner of the general classification	Denotes the winner of the young rider classification
Denotes the winner of the points classification	Denotes the winner of the team classification
Denotes the winner of the mountains classification	Denotes the winner of the combativity award

=== General classification ===
Result
Rank	Rider	Team	Time
1	Tadej Pogačar (SLO)	UAE Team Emirates XRG	15h 08' 43"
2	Richard Carapaz (ECU)	EF Education–EasyPost	+ 6' 32"
3	Mathias Vacek (CZE)	Lidl–Trek	+ 6' 53"
4	Tobias Foss (NOR)	Netcompany INEOS	+ 7' 34"
5	Ilan Van Wilder (BEL)	Soudal–Quick-Step	+ 7' 51"
6	Brandon McNulty (USA)	UAE Team Emirates XRG	+ 7' 53"
7	Matthew Riccitello (USA)	Decathlon CMA CGM	+ 8' 48"
8	Primož Roglič (SLO)	Red Bull–Bora–Hansgrohe	+ 9' 23"
9	Sergio Higuita (COL)	XDS Astana Team	+ 9' 26"
10	Bart Lemmen (NED)	Visma–Lease a Bike	+ 9' 44"

=== Points classification ===
Result
Rank	Rider	Team	Points
1	Tadej Pogačar (SLO)	UAE Team Emirates XRG	42
2	Bart Lemmen (NED)	Visma–Lease a Bike	20
3	Romain Grégoire (FRA)	Groupama–FDJ United	18
4	Jhonatan Narváez (ECU)	UAE Team Emirates XRG	16
5	Xandro Meurisse (BEL)	Pinarello–Q36.5 Pro Cycling Team	14
6	Richard Carapaz (ECU)	EF Education–EasyPost	12
7	Lenny Martinez (FRA)	Team Bahrain Victorious	12
8	Marcel Camprubí (ESP)	Pinarello–Q36.5 Pro Cycling Team	12
9	Mathieu van der Poel (NED)	Alpecin–Premier Tech	10
10	Andrea Bagioli (ITA)	Lidl–Trek	8

=== Mountains classification ===
Result
Rank	Rider	Team	Points
1	Louis Vervaeke (BEL)	Soudal–Quick-Step	52
2	Bauke Mollema (NED)	Lidl–Trek	32
3	Lenny Martinez (FRA)	Team Bahrain Victorious	23
4	Paul Double (GBR)	Team Jayco–AlUla	17
5	Tadej Pogačar (SLO)	UAE Team Emirates XRG	14
6	Xandro Meurisse (BEL)	Pinarello–Q36.5 Pro Cycling Team	13
7	Jhonatan Narváez (ECU)	UAE Team Emirates XRG	10
8	Mauro Schmid (SUI)	Team Jayco–AlUla	10
9	Bart Lemmen (NED)	Visma–Lease a Bike	6
10	Andrea Bagioli (ITA)	Lidl–Trek	6

=== Young rider classification ===
Result
Rank	Rider	Team	Time
1	Mathias Vacek (CZE)	Lidl–Trek	15h 15' 36"
2	Matthew Riccitello (USA)	Decathlon CMA CGM	+ 1' 55"
3	Finlay Pickering (GBR)	Team Jayco–AlUla	+ 5' 29"
4	Simon Dalby (DEN)	Uno-X Mobility	+ 7' 21"
5	Lorenzo Germani (ITA)	Groupama–FDJ United	+ 16' 47"
6	Romain Grégoire (FRA)	Groupama–FDJ United	+ 17' 35"
7	Ewen Costiou (FRA)	Groupama–FDJ United	+ 18' 31"
8	Lenny Martinez (FRA)	Team Bahrain Victorious	+ 20' 39"
9	Andrew August (USA)	Netcompany INEOS	+ 21' 08"
10	Bjoern Koerdt (GBR)	Team Picnic–PostNL	+ 21' 16"

=== Team classification ===
Result
Rank	Team	Time
1	(United Arab Emirates) UAE Team Emirates XRG	45h 45' 00"
2	(France) Decathlon CMA CGM	+ 20' 37"
3	(Belgium) Soudal–Quick-Step	+ 21' 19"
4	(Australia) Team Jayco–AlUla	+ 24' 35"
5	(Germany) Lidl–Trek	+ 33' 01"
6	(Spain) Movistar Team	+ 35' 09"
7	(Netherlands) Visma–Lease a Bike	+ 38' 41"
8	(United Kingdom) Netcompany INEOS	+ 39' 41"
9	(France) Groupama–FDJ United	+ 46' 35"
10	(Germany) Red Bull–Bora–Hansgrohe	+ 48' 16"
