= 2026 Tour de Pologne =

2026 UCI World Tour, race 28 of 36
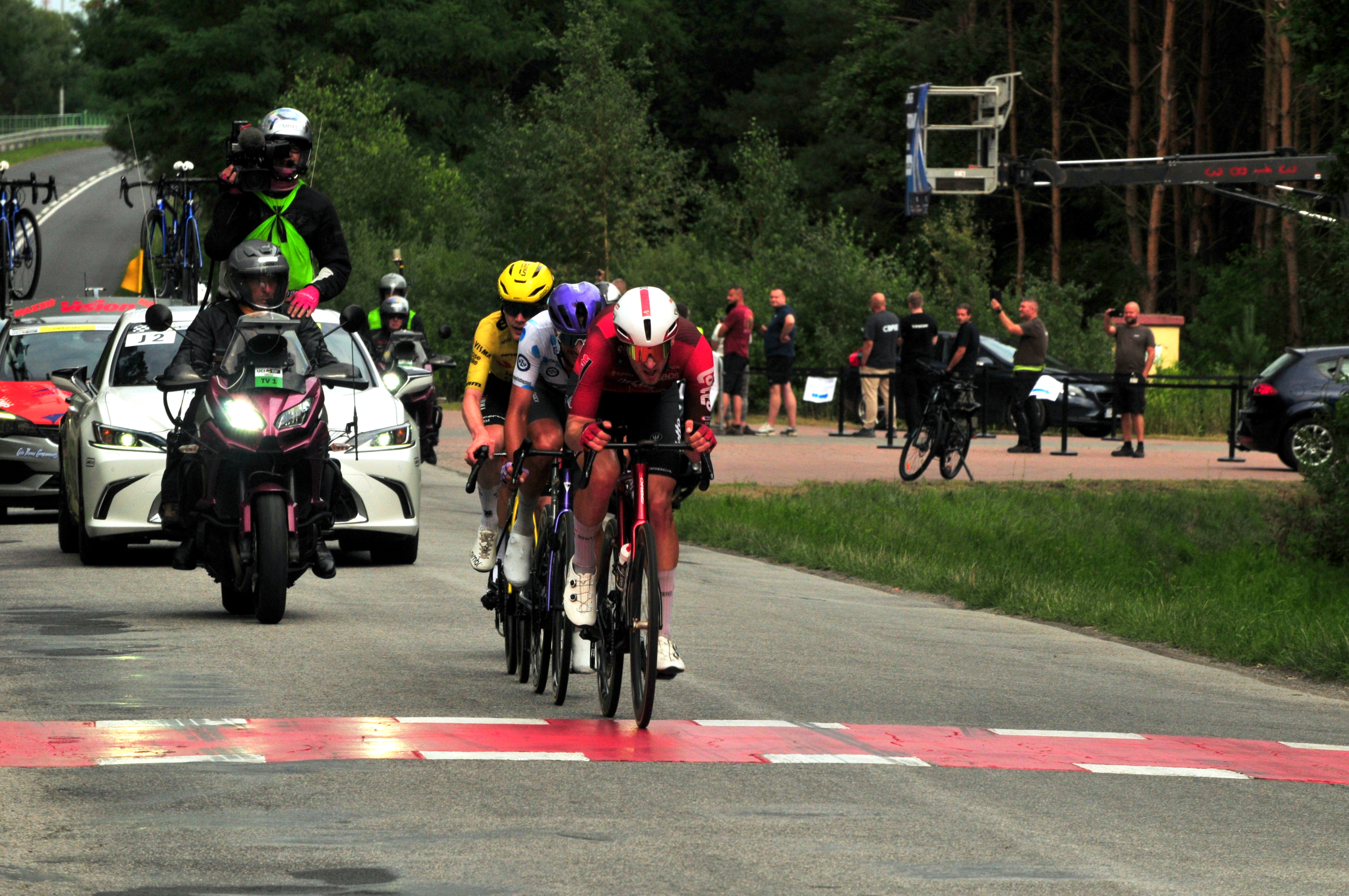

Race details
- Dates: 3–9 August 2026
- Stages: 7
- Distance: 1,110.7 km (690.2 mi)
- Winning time: 24h 33' 49"

Results
Jersey awarded to the overall winner	Winner	Marco Brenner (GER)	(Tudor Pro Cycling Team)
	Second	Finn Fisher-Black (NZL)	(Red Bull–Bora–Hansgrohe)
	Third	Iván Romeo (ESP)	(Movistar Team)
Jersey awarded to the points classification winner	Points	Marco Brenner (GER)	(Tudor Pro Cycling Team)
Jersey awarded to the mountains classification winner	Mountains	Walter Calzoni (ITA)	(Pinarello–Q36.5 Pro Cycling Team)
Jersey awarded to the combativity classification winner	Combativity	Radoslaw Frątczak (POL)	(Poland)
	Team	(Netherlands) Visma–Lease a Bike	

The 2026 Tour de Pologne was the 83rd edition of the Tour de Pologne road cycling stage race, and the 28th event of the men's 2026 UCI World Tour. The race began on 3 August in Gdynia and finished on 9 August in Wieliczka.

== Teams ==
All eighteen UCI WorldTeams, two UCI ProTeams, and the Polish national team made up the twenty-one teams that participated in the race.

UCI WorldTeams

- Alpecin–Premier Tech
- Decathlon CMA CGM
- EF Education–EasyPost
- Groupama–FDJ United
- Lidl–Trek
- Lotto–Intermarché
- Movistar Team
- Netcompany INEOS
- NSN Cycling Team
- Red Bull–Bora–Hansgrohe
- Soudal–Quick-Step
- Team Bahrain Victorious
- Team Jayco–AlUla
- Team Picnic–PostNL
- UAE Team Emirates XRG
- Uno-X Mobility
- Visma–Lease a Bike
- XDS Astana Team

UCI ProTeams

- Pinarello–Q36.5 Pro Cycling Team
- Tudor Pro Cycling Team

National Teams

- Poland

== Schedule ==
Stage characteristics and winners
Stage	Date	Course	Distance	Type	Stage winner
1	3 August	Gdynia to Koszalin	234.2 km (145.5 mi)	Hilly stage	Jonathan Milan (ITA)
2	4 August	Międzyzdroje to Szczecin	150.1 km (93.3 mi)	Flat stage	Jonathan Milan (ITA)
3	5 August	Gorzów Wielkopolski to Zielona Góra	193.5 km (120.2 mi)	Hilly stage	Jonathan Milan (ITA)
4	6 August	Żagań to Karpacz	176.0 km (109.4 mi)	Mountain stage	Bart Lemmen (NED)
5	7 August	Opole to Kocierz Resort	218.9 km (136.0 mi)	Hilly stage	Jan Christen (SUI)
6	8 August	Bukowina Resort to Bukowina Tatrzańska	125.5 km (78.0 mi)	Mountain stage	Louis Barré (FRA)
7	9 August	Wieliczka to Wieliczka	12.5 km (7.8 mi)	Individual time trial	Stefan Küng (SUI)
Total			1,110.7 km (690.2 mi)		

== Stages ==
=== Stage 1 ===
3 August 2026 – Gdynia to Koszalin, 234.2 km (145.5 mi)

Stage 1 Result
Rank	Rider	Team	Time
1	Jonathan Milan (ITA)	Lidl–Trek	5h 04' 11"
2	Paul Magnier (FRA)	Soudal–Quick-Step	+ 0"
3	Noah Hobbs (GBR)	EF Education–EasyPost	+ 0"
4	Juan Sebastián Molano (COL)	UAE Team Emirates XRG	+ 0"
5	Gerben Thijssen (BEL)	Alpecin–Premier Tech	+ 0"
6	Iván García Cortina (ESP)	Movistar Team	+ 0"
7	Hugo Hofstetter (FRA)	NSN Cycling Team	+ 0"
8	Matteo Moschetti (ITA)	Pinarello–Q36.5 Pro Cycling Team	+ 0"
9	Jordi Meeus (BEL)	Red Bull–Bora–Hansgrohe	+ 0"
10	Sakarias Koller Løland (NOR)	Uno-X Mobility	+ 0"

General classification after Stage 1
Rank	Rider	Team	Time
1	Jonathan Milan (ITA)	Lidl–Trek	5h 04' 01"
2	Kamil Małecki (POL)	Pinarello–Q36.5 Pro Cycling Team	+ 2"
3	Paul Magnier (FRA)	Soudal–Quick-Step	+ 4"
4	Noah Hobbs (GBR)	EF Education–EasyPost	+ 6"
5	Rudy Molard (FRA)	Groupama–FDJ United	+ 8"
6	Bart Lemmen (NED)	Visma–Lease a Bike	+ 8"
7	Juan Sebastián Molano (COL)	UAE Team Emirates XRG	+ 10"
8	Gerben Thijssen (BEL)	Alpecin–Premier Tech	+ 10"
9	Iván García Cortina (ESP)	Movistar Team	+ 10"
10	Hugo Hofstetter (FRA)	NSN Cycling Team	+ 10"

=== Stage 2 ===
4 August 2026 – Międzyzdroje to Szczecin, 150.1 km (93.3 mi)

Stage 2 Result
Rank	Rider	Team	Time
1	Jonathan Milan (ITA)	Lidl–Trek	3h 05' 37"
2	Paul Magnier (FRA)	Soudal–Quick-Step	+ 0"
3	Matteo Malucelli (ITA)	XDS Astana Team	+ 0"
4	Iván García Cortina (ESP)	Movistar Team	+ 0"
5	Daniel Skerl (ITA)	Team Bahrain Victorious	+ 0"
6	Simon Dehairs (BEL)	Alpecin–Premier Tech	+ 0"
7	Maikel Zijlaard (NED)	Tudor Pro Cycling Team	+ 0"
8	Sakarias Koller Løland (NOR)	Uno-X Mobility	+ 0"
9	Marceli Bogusławski (POL)	Poland	+ 0"
10	Jordi Meeus (BEL)	Red Bull–Bora–Hansgrohe	+ 0"

General classification after Stage 2
Rank	Rider	Team	Time
1	Jonathan Milan (ITA)	Lidl–Trek	8h 09' 28"
2	Paul Magnier (FRA)	Soudal–Quick-Step	+ 8"
3	Kamil Małecki (POL)	Pinarello–Q36.5 Pro Cycling Team	+ 12"
4	Jonas Rutsch (GER)	Lotto–Intermarché	+ 14"
5	Matteo Malucelli (ITA)	XDS Astana Team	+ 16"
6	Noah Hobbs (GBR)	EF Education–EasyPost	+ 16"
7	Patryk Stosz (POL)	Poland	+ 18"
8	Bart Lemmen (NED)	Visma–Lease a Bike	+ 18"
9	Rudy Molard (FRA)	Groupama–FDJ United	+ 18"
10	Anton Schiffer (GER)	Visma–Lease a Bike	+ 19"

=== Stage 3 ===
5 August 2026 – Gorzów Wielkopolski to Zielona Góra, 193.5 km (120.2 mi)

Stage 3 Result
Rank	Rider	Team	Time
1	Jonathan Milan (ITA)	Lidl–Trek	4h 11' 51"
2	Noah Hobbs (GBR)	EF Education–EasyPost	+ 0"
3	Alessandro Romele (ITA)	XDS Astana Team	+ 0"
4	Oded Kogut (ISR)	NSN Cycling Team	+ 0"
5	Daniel Skerl (ITA)	Team Bahrain Victorious	+ 0"
6	Sakarias Koller Løland (NOR)	Uno-X Mobility	+ 0"
7	Gerben Thijssen (BEL)	Alpecin–Premier Tech	+ 0"
8	Steffen De Schuyteneer (BEL)	Lotto–Intermarché	+ 0"
9	Maikel Zijlaard (NED)	Tudor Pro Cycling Team	+ 0"
10	Tord Gudmestad (NOR)	Decathlon CMA CGM	+ 0"

General classification after Stage 3
Rank	Rider	Team	Time
1	Jonathan Milan (ITA)	Lidl–Trek	12h 21' 09"
2	Paul Magnier (FRA)	Soudal–Quick-Step	+ 18"
3	Noah Hobbs (GBR)	EF Education–EasyPost	+ 20"
4	Kamil Małecki (POL)	Pinarello–Q36.5 Pro Cycling Team	+ 22"
5	Fabio Christen (SUI)	Pinarello–Q36.5 Pro Cycling Team	+ 24"
6	Jonas Rutsch (GER)	Lotto–Intermarché	+ 24"
7	Matteo Sobrero (ITA)	Lidl–Trek	+ 25"
8	Matteo Malucelli (ITA)	XDS Astana Team	+ 26"
9	Alessandro Romele (ITA)	XDS Astana Team	+ 26"
10	Bart Lemmen (NED)	Visma–Lease a Bike	+ 28"

=== Stage 4 ===
6 August 2026 – Żagań to Karpacz, 176.0 km (109.4 mi)

Stage 4 Result
Rank	Rider	Team	Time
1	Bart Lemmen (NED)	Visma–Lease a Bike	3h 54' 45"
2	Christian Scaroni (ITA)	XDS Astana Team	+ 0"
3	Axel Laurance (FRA)	Netcompany INEOS	+ 14"
4	Marco Brenner (GER)	Tudor Pro Cycling Team	+ 14"
5	Louis Barré (FRA)	Visma–Lease a Bike	+ 16"
6	Alberto Bettiol (ITA)	XDS Astana Team	+ 16"
7	Paul Lapeira (FRA)	Decathlon CMA CGM	+ 16"
8	Finn Fisher-Black (NZL)	Red Bull–Bora–Hansgrohe	+ 16"
9	Aaron Dockx (BEL)	Alpecin–Premier Tech	+ 16"
10	Andreas Kron (DEN)	Uno-X Mobility	+ 20"

General classification after Stage 4
Rank	Rider	Team	Time
1	Bart Lemmen (NED)	Visma–Lease a Bike	16h 16' 12"
2	Christian Scaroni (ITA)	XDS Astana Team	+ 6"
3	Marco Brenner (GER)	Tudor Pro Cycling Team	+ 26"
4	Matteo Sobrero (ITA)	Lidl–Trek	+ 27"
5	Finn Fisher-Black (NZL)	Red Bull–Bora–Hansgrohe	+ 28"
6	Louis Barré (FRA)	Visma–Lease a Bike	+ 28"
7	Paul Lapeira (FRA)	Decathlon CMA CGM	+ 28"
8	Alberto Bettiol (ITA)	XDS Astana Team	+ 28"
9	Aaron Dockx (BEL)	Alpecin–Premier Tech	+ 28"
10	Andreas Kron (DEN)	Uno-X Mobility	+ 32"

=== Stage 5 ===
7 August 2026 – Opole to Kocierz Resort, 218.9 km (136.0 mi)

Stage 5 Result
Rank	Rider	Team	Time
1	Jan Christen (SUI)	UAE Team Emirates XRG	4h 53' 32"
2	Marco Brenner (GER)	Tudor Pro Cycling Team	+ 0"
3	Louis Barré (FRA)	Visma–Lease a Bike	+ 4"
4	Axel Laurance (FRA)	Netcompany INEOS	+ 5"
5	Paul Lapeira (FRA)	Decathlon CMA CGM	+ 5"
6	Fabio Christen (SUI)	Pinarello–Q36.5 Pro Cycling Team	+ 5"
7	Finn Fisher-Black (NZL)	Red Bull–Bora–Hansgrohe	+ 5"
8	Alberto Bettiol (ITA)	XDS Astana Team	+ 5"
9	Christian Scaroni (ITA)	XDS Astana Team	+ 5"
10	Matteo Sobrero (ITA)	Lidl–Trek	+ 5"

General classification after Stage 5
Rank	Rider	Team	Time
1	Bart Lemmen (NED)	Visma–Lease a Bike	21h 09' 49"
2	Christian Scaroni (ITA)	XDS Astana Team	+ 6"
3	Marco Brenner (GER)	Tudor Pro Cycling Team	+ 15"
4	Jan Christen (SUI)	UAE Team Emirates XRG	+ 18"
5	Louis Barré (FRA)	Visma–Lease a Bike	+ 23"
6	Matteo Sobrero (ITA)	Lidl–Trek	+ 27"
7	Finn Fisher-Black (NZL)	Red Bull–Bora–Hansgrohe	+ 28"
8	Paul Lapeira (FRA)	Decathlon CMA CGM	+ 28"
9	Alberto Bettiol (ITA)	XDS Astana Team	+ 28"
10	Andreas Kron (DEN)	Uno-X Mobility	+ 32"

=== Stage 6 ===
8 August 2026 – Bukowina Resort to Bukowina Tatrzańska, 125.5 km (78.0 mi)

Stage 6 Result
Rank	Rider	Team	Time
1	Louis Barré (FRA)	Visma–Lease a Bike	3h 09' 03"
2	Christian Scaroni (ITA)	XDS Astana Team	+ 10"
3	Marco Brenner (GER)	Tudor Pro Cycling Team	+ 10"
4	Fredrik Dversnes (NOR)	Uno-X Mobility	+ 10"
5	Axel Laurance (FRA)	Netcompany INEOS	+ 10"
6	Paul Lapeira (FRA)	Decathlon CMA CGM	+ 10"
7	Maximilian Schachmann (GER)	Soudal–Quick-Step	+ 10"
8	Finn Fisher-Black (NZL)	Red Bull–Bora–Hansgrohe	+ 10"
9	Andreas Kron (DEN)	Uno-X Mobility	+ 10"
10	Iván Romeo (ESP)	Movistar Team	+ 10"

General classification after Stage 6
Rank	Rider	Team	Time
1	Christian Scaroni (ITA)	XDS Astana Team	24h 19' 02"
2	Louis Barré (FRA)	Visma–Lease a Bike	+ 3"
3	Bart Lemmen (NED)	Visma–Lease a Bike	+ 5"
4	Marco Brenner (GER)	Tudor Pro Cycling Team	+ 11"
5	Jan Christen (SUI)	UAE Team Emirates XRG	+ 23"
6	Finn Fisher-Black (NZL)	Red Bull–Bora–Hansgrohe	+ 28"
7	Paul Lapeira (FRA)	Decathlon CMA CGM	+ 28"
8	Andreas Kron (DEN)	Uno-X Mobility	+ 32"
9	Matteo Sobrero (ITA)	Lidl–Trek	+ 32"
10	Iván Romeo (ESP)	Movistar Team	+ 33"

=== Stage 7 ===
9 August 2026 – Wieliczka to Wieliczka, 12.5 km (7.8 mi) (ITT)

Stage 7 Result
Rank	Rider	Team	Time
1	Stefan Küng (SUI)	Tudor Pro Cycling Team	14' 25"
2	Finn Fisher-Black (NZL)	Red Bull–Bora–Hansgrohe	+ 4"
3	Callum Thornley (GBR)	Red Bull–Bora–Hansgrohe	+ 4"
4	Iván Romeo (ESP)	Movistar Team	+ 5"
5	Magnus Sheffield (USA)	Netcompany INEOS	+ 9"
6	Arthur Kluckers (LUX)	Tudor Pro Cycling Team	+ 10"
7	Marco Brenner (GER)	Tudor Pro Cycling Team	+ 11"
8	Ethan Hayter (GBR)	Soudal–Quick-Step	+ 14"
9	Artem Shmidt (USA)	Netcompany INEOS	+ 14"
10	Sjoerd Bax (NED)	Pinarello–Q36.5 Pro Cycling Team	+ 16"

General classification after Stage 7
Rank	Rider	Team	Time
1	Marco Brenner (GER)	Tudor Pro Cycling Team	24h 33' 49"
2	Finn Fisher-Black (NZL)	Red Bull–Bora–Hansgrohe	+ 10"
3	Iván Romeo (ESP)	Movistar Team	+ 16"
4	Louis Barré (FRA)	Visma–Lease a Bike	+ 19"
5	Bart Lemmen (NED)	Visma–Lease a Bike	+ 20"
6	Jan Christen (SUI)	UAE Team Emirates XRG	+ 22"
7	Christian Scaroni (ITA)	XDS Astana Team	+ 25"
8	Matteo Sobrero (ITA)	Lidl–Trek	+ 28"
9	Alberto Bettiol (ITA)	XDS Astana Team	+ 30"
10	Aleksandr Vlasov	Red Bull–Bora–Hansgrohe	+ 34"

== Classification leadership table ==
Classification leadership by stage
Stage	Winner	General classification (Polish: Klasyfikacja generalna)	Points classification (Polish: Klasyfikacja punktowa)	Mountains classification (Polish: Klasyfikacja górska)	Active rider classification (Polish: Klasyfikacja najaktywniejszych)	Polish rider classification (Polish: Najlepszy Polak)	Team classification (Polish: Klasyfikacja drużynowa)
1	Jonathan Milan	Jonathan Milan	Jonathan Milan	Dries De Bondt	Kamil Małecki	Kamil Małecki	Netcompany INEOS
2	Jonathan Milan	Jonathan Milan	Jonathan Milan	Dries De Bondt	Radosław Frątczak	Kamil Małecki	Alpecin–Premier Tech
3	Jonathan Milan	Jonathan Milan	Jonathan Milan	Dries De Bondt	Radosław Frątczak	Kamil Małecki	Alpecin–Premier Tech
4	Bart Lemmen	Bart Lemmen	Jonathan Milan	Bart Lemmen	Radosław Frątczak	Michał Kwiatkowski	Visma–Lease a Bike
5	Jan Christen	Bart Lemmen	Jonathan Milan	Dries De Bondt	Radosław Frątczak	Filip Gruszczyński	Visma–Lease a Bike
6	Louis Barré	Christian Scaroni	Jonathan Milan	Walter Calzoni	Radosław Frątczak	Filip Gruszczyński	Visma–Lease a Bike
7	Stefan Küng	Marco Brenner	Marco Brenner	Walter Calzoni	Radosław Frątczak	Filip Gruszczyński	Visma–Lease a Bike
Final		Marco Brenner	Marco Brenner	Walter Calzoni	Radosław Frątczak	Filip Gruszczyński	Visma–Lease a Bike

== Classification standings ==
Legend
Denotes the leader of the general classification	Denotes the leader of the points classification
Denotes the leader of the mountains classification	Denotes the leader of the active rider classification

=== General classification ===
Final general classification (1–10)
Rank	Rider	Team	Time
1	Marco Brenner (GER)	Tudor Pro Cycling Team	24h 33' 49"
2	Finn Fisher-Black (NZL)	Red Bull–Bora–Hansgrohe	+ 10"
3	Iván Romeo (ESP)	Movistar Team	+ 16"
4	Louis Barré (FRA)	Visma–Lease a Bike	+ 19"
5	Bart Lemmen (NED)	Visma–Lease a Bike	+ 20"
6	Jan Christen (SUI)	UAE Team Emirates XRG	+ 22"
7	Christian Scaroni (ITA)	XDS Astana Team	+ 25"
8	Matteo Sobrero (ITA)	Lidl–Trek	+ 28"
9	Alberto Bettiol (ITA)	XDS Astana Team	+ 30"
10	Aleksandr Vlasov	Red Bull–Bora–Hansgrohe	+ 34"

=== Points classification ===
Final points classification (1–10)
Rank	Rider	Team	Points
1	Marco Brenner (GER)	Tudor Pro Cycling Team	68
2	Jonathan Milan (ITA)	Lidl–Trek	60
3	Finn Fisher-Black (NZL)	Red Bull–Bora–Hansgrohe	59
4	Axel Laurance (FRA)	Netcompany INEOS	55
5	Louis Barré (FRA)	Visma–Lease a Bike	54
6	Christian Scaroni (ITA)	XDS Astana Team	50
7	Paul Lapeira (FRA)	Decathlon CMA CGM	45
8	Iván Romeo (ESP)	Movistar Team	43
9	Alberto Bettiol (ITA)	XDS Astana Team	42
10	Jan Christen (SUI)	UAE Team Emirates XRG	40

=== Mountains classification ===
Final mountains classification (1–10)
Rank	Rider	Team	Points
1	Walter Calzoni (ITA)	Pinarello–Q36.5 Pro Cycling Team	35
2	Dries De Bondt (BEL)	Team Jayco–AlUla	24
3	Louis Barré (FRA)	Visma–Lease a Bike	17
4	Bart Lemmen (NED)	Visma–Lease a Bike	10
5	Santiago Buitrago (COL)	Team Bahrain Victorious	10
6	Mikkel Bjerg (DEN)	UAE Team Emirates XRG	10
7	Magnus Sheffield (USA)	Netcompany INEOS	9
8	Tim Naberman (NED)	Team Picnic–PostNL	9
9	Steff Cras (BEL)	Soudal–Quick-Step	8
10	Finn Fisher-Black (NZL)	Red Bull–Bora–Hansgrohe	7

=== Active rider classification ===
Final active rider classification (1–10)
Rank	Rider	Team	Points
1	Radosław Frątczak (POL)	Poland	18
2	Kamil Małecki (POL)	Pinarello–Q36.5 Pro Cycling Team	8
3	Dries De Bondt (BEL)	Team Jayco–AlUla	7
4	Fabio Christen (SUI)	Pinarello–Q36.5 Pro Cycling Team	6
5	Jonas Rutsch (GER)	Lotto–Intermarché	6
6	Matteo Sobrero (ITA)	Lidl–Trek	5
7	Taco van der Hoorn (NED)	Lotto–Intermarché	5
8	Alessandro Borgo (ITA)	Team Bahrain Victorious	3
9	Tim Naberman (NED)	Team Picnic–PostNL	3
10	Bart Lemmen (NED)	Visma–Lease a Bike	2

=== Team classification ===
Final team classification (1–10)
Rank	Team	Time
1	(Netherlands) Visma–Lease a Bike	73h 43' 27"
2	(Kazakhstan) XDS Astana Team	+ 58"
3	(Norway) Uno-X Mobility	+ 1' 26"
4	(Germany) Red Bull–Bora–Hansgrohe	+ 3' 00"
5	(Spain) Movistar Team	+ 4' 05"
6	(Switzerland) Tudor Pro Cycling Team	+ 6' 11"
7	(Switzerland) Pinarello–Q36.5 Pro Cycling Team	+ 8' 47"
8	Team Bahrain Victorious	+ 14' 56"
9	(United Kingdom) Netcompany INEOS	+ 18' 34"
10	(Netherlands) Team Picnic–PostNL	+ 22' 55"

== See also ==
- Tour of Małopolska
