= Xabier Berasategi =

Spanish cyclist (born 2000)

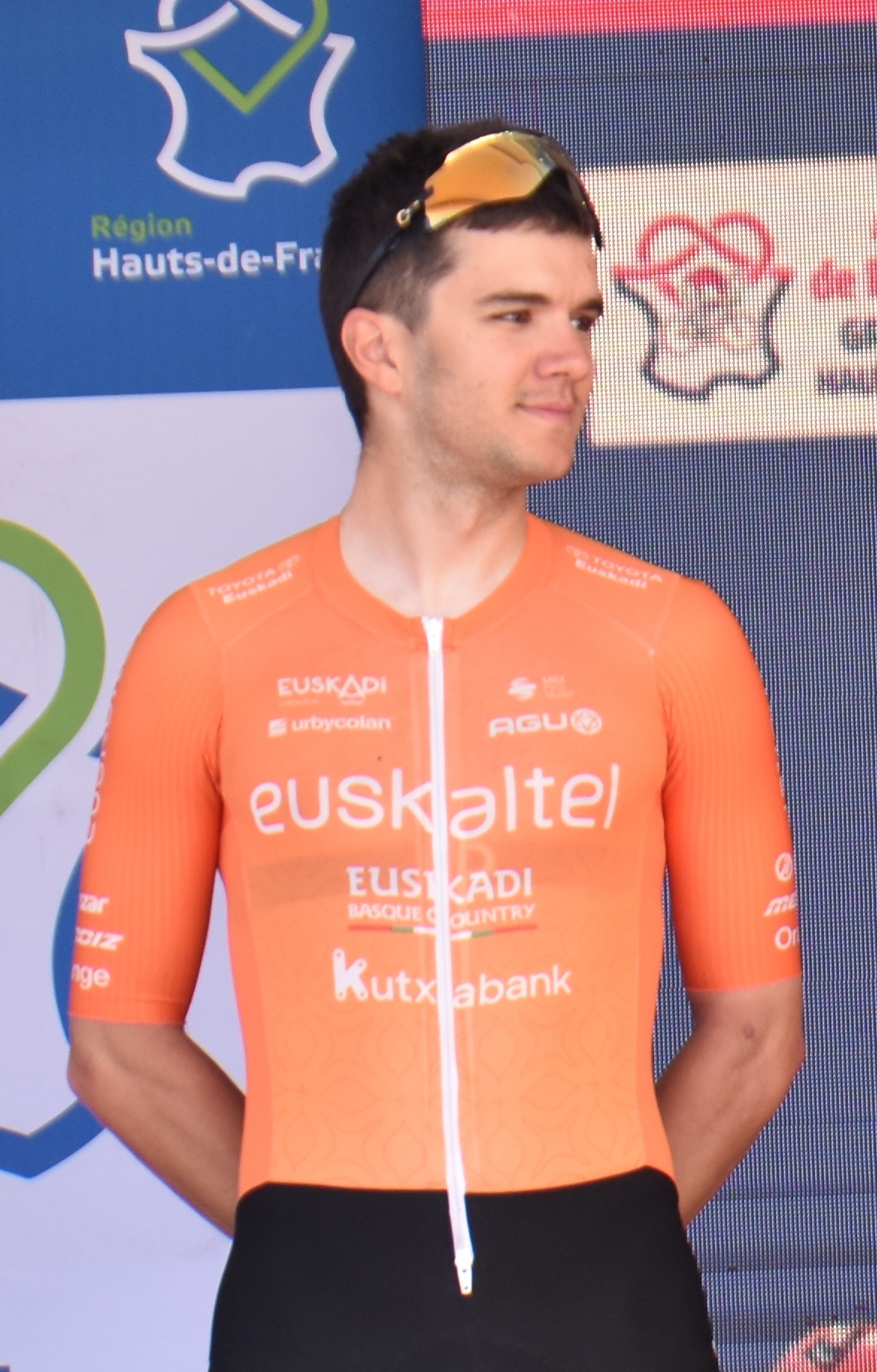
- Berasategi at the 2025 Four Days of Dunkirk

Personal information
- Full name: Xabier Berasategi Garmendia
- Born: 8 April 2000 (age 26) Olaberria, Spain

Cycling career
- Sport: Cycling
- Current team: Euskaltel–Euskadi
- Discipline: Road
- Role: Rider

Amateur team
- 2019–2022: Laboral Kutxa

Professional team
- 2023–: Euskaltel–Euskadi

Xabier Berasategi Garmendia (born 8 April 2000) is a Spanish professional racing cyclist, who currently rides for UCI ProTeam Euskaltel–Euskadi.

== Major results ==
2018
2nd Overall Vuelta a Pamplona

1st Stage 4

2020
1st Overall Vuelta a Cantabria

1st Young rider classification

2021
1st Stage 2 Vuelta a Zamora
2022
1st Stage 4 Vuelta a Madrid Under-23
2023
8th Trofeo Matteotti
10th Prueba Villafranca de Ordizia
2024
7th Route Adélie
9th Grand Prix du Morbihan
2025
8th Trofeo Matteotti
10th Cholet Agglo Tour
2026
2nd Tour de Vendée
6th Binche–Chimay–Binche

=== Grand Tour general classification results timeline ===
Grand Tour	2024
Giro d'Italia	—
Tour de France	—
Vuelta a España	102

Legend
—	Did not compete
DNF	Did not finish
