= Iwan Spekenbrink =

Dutch cycling team manager

Personal information
- Born: 15 February 1976 (age 50)

Cycling career
- Sport: Cycling
- Current team: Team Picnic–PostNL
- Discipline: Road
- Role: Team manager

Managerial team
- 2005–: Shimano–Memory Corp

Iwan Spekenbrink (born 15 February 1976) is a Dutch cycling manager, who has been the team manager of UCI WorldTeam Team Picnic–PostNL since the team's creation in 2005. He is also the president of the AIGCP, which he was elected to in 2015.

He competed as a cyclist as a junior before moving onto working as a team manager.
