= Alexy Faure Prost =

French cyclist (born 2004)

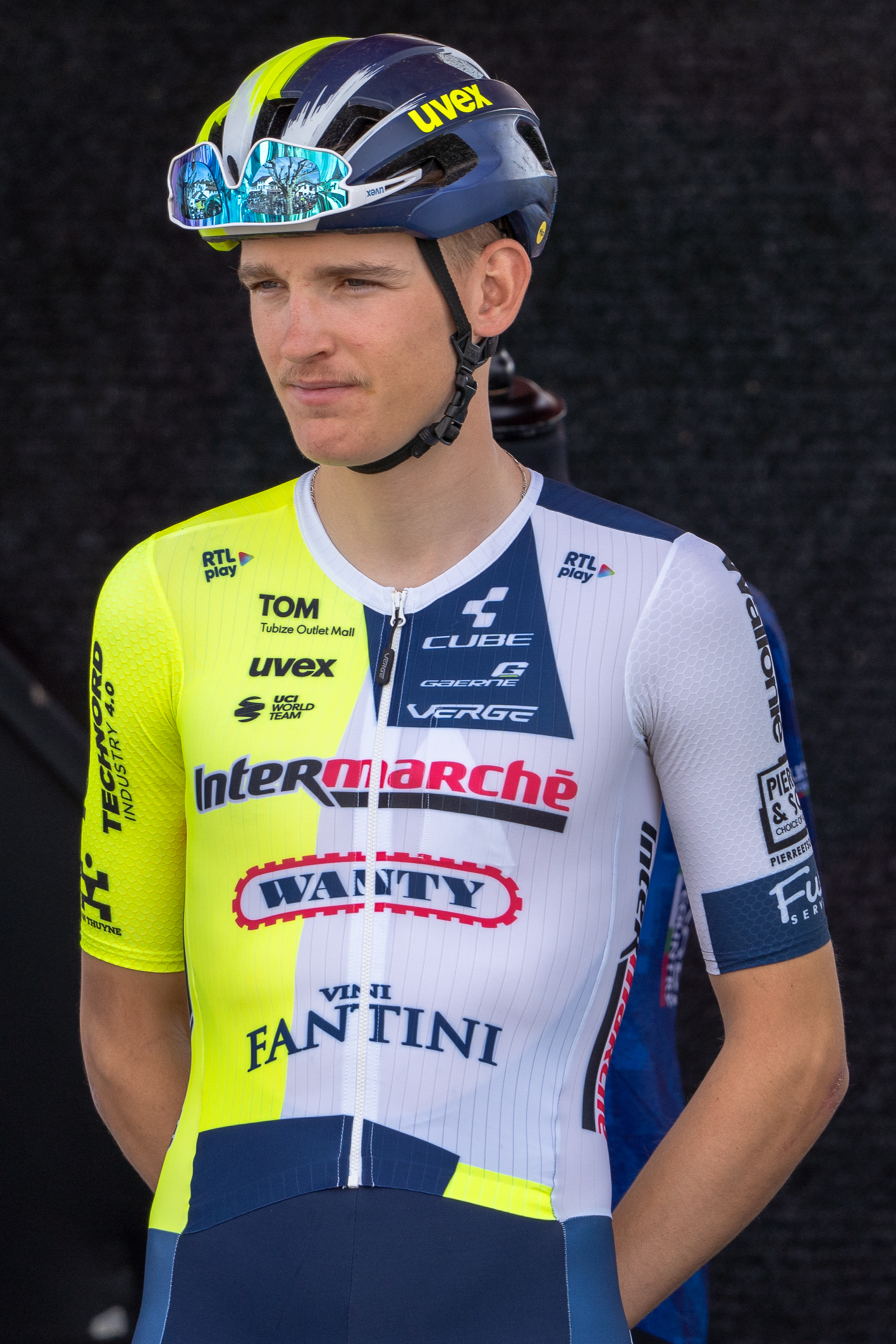
- Faure Prost in 2024

Personal information
- Born: 22 April 2004 (age 22)
- Height: 1.84 m (6 ft 0 in)
- Weight: 67 kg (148 lb)

Cycling career
- Sport: Cycling
- Current team: Team Picnic–PostNL
- Discipline: Road
- Role: Rider

Amateur team
- 2021–2022: VC Tournus Junior

Professional teams
- 2023: Circus–ReUz–Technord
- 2024–2025: Intermarché–Wanty
- 2026–: Team Picnic–PostNL

Alexy Faure Prost (born 22 April 2004) is a French professional road cyclist, who currently rides for UCI WorldTeam Team Picnic–PostNL.

== Major results ==
2022
8th La Classique des Alpes Juniors
10th Overall Tour du Valromey

1st Stage 5

2023
1st Road race, National Under-23 Road Championships
1st La Get Up Cup
1st Grand Prix de Raygeo - Villiers-le-Temple
2nd Overall Giro della Valle d'Aosta

1st Young rider classification

3rd Arden Challenge 2
5th Overall Giro Next Gen

1st Young rider classification

6th Overall Triptyque Ardennais
2024
10th Overall Tour of Oman
