= Kobe Goossens =

Belgian cyclist

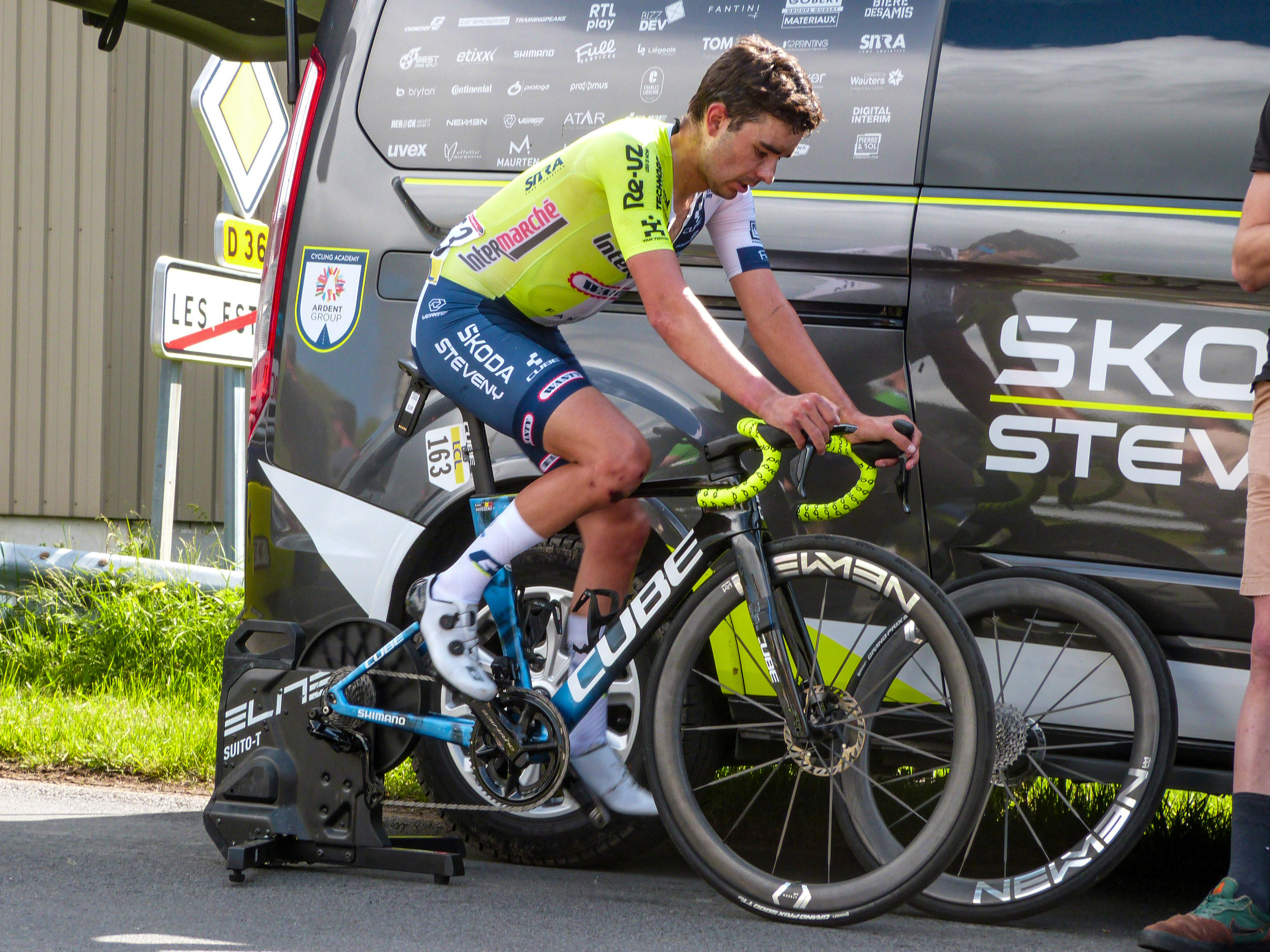
- Goossens in 2024

Personal information
- Born: 29 April 1996 (age 30) Leuven, Belgium
- Height: 1.78 m (5 ft 10 in)
- Weight: 64 kg (141 lb)

Cycling career
- Sport: Cycling
- Discipline: Road
- Role: Rider
- Rider type: Climber

Amateur team
- 2018–2019: Lotto–Soudal U23

Professional teams
- 2015–2016: Telenet–Fidea
- 2017: Marlux–Napoleon Games
- 2020–2021: Lotto–Soudal
- 2022–2025: Intermarché–Wanty–Gobert Matériaux

Kobe Goossens (born 29 April 1996) is a Belgian former professional cyclist who last rode for UCI WorldTeam Intermarché–Wanty.

After retiring he became a real estate agent.

== Major results ==
=== Road ===
2018
2nd Overall Tour du Jura

1st Young rider classification

3rd De Vlaamse Pijl
6th Circuit de Wallonie
8th Overall Ronde de l'Isard
9th Eschborn–Frankfurt Under–23
2019
1st Overall Tour du Jura

1st Stage 1

2nd Overall Vuelta a Navarra
3rd Overall Circuit des Ardennes
5th Internationale Wielertrofee Jong Maar Moedig
7th Overall Tour du Loir-et-Cher
2021
1st Mountains classification, Tour de Romandie
2022
5th Trofeo Serra de Tramuntana
7th Trofeo Calvià
9th Trofeo Pollença–Port d'Andratx
2023 (2 pro wins)
1st Trofeo Andratx–Mirador D'es Colomer
1st Trofeo Serra de Tramuntana
6th Overall Giro di Sicilia
7th Trofeo Calvia
10th Figueira Champions Classic
2024
6th Eschborn–Frankfurt
Combativity award Stage 10 Tour de France

=== Grand Tour general classification results timeline ===
Grand Tour	2020	2021	2022	2023	2024
Giro d'Italia	—	DNF	—	—	—
Tour de France	—	—	47	—	69
Vuelta a España	24	—	—	DNF	DNF

Legend
—	Did not compete
DNF	Did not finish

=== Cyclo-cross ===
2013–2014
3rd Overall UCI Junior World Cup

1st Koksijde
2nd Rome

1st Junior Kalmthout
Junior Superprestige

3rd Hamme
3rd Diegem
3rd Middelkerke

Junior BPost Bank Trophy

3rd Ronse
