= Finn Fisher-Black =

New Zealand road cyclist (born 2001)

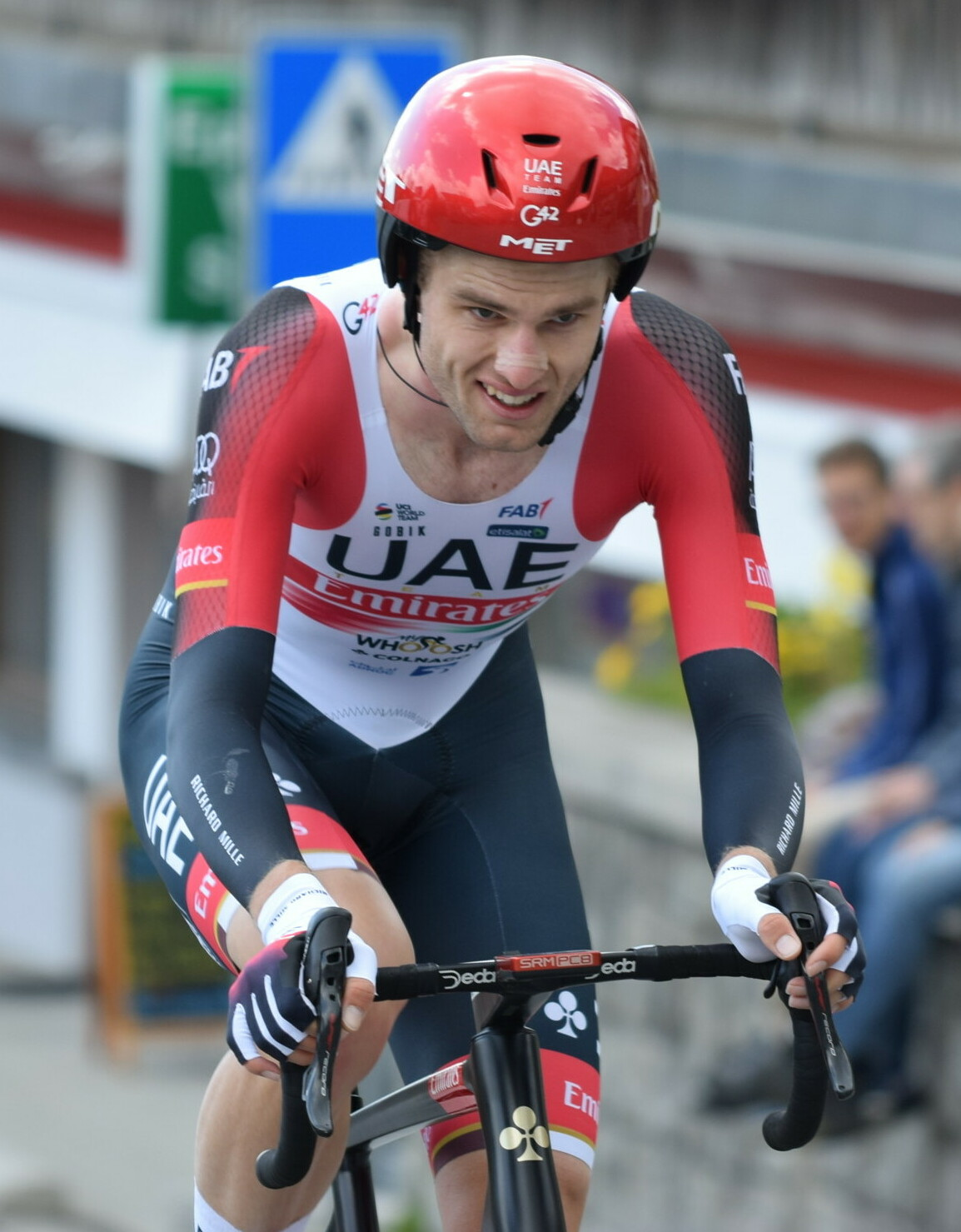
- Fisher-Black at 2022 Tour de Romandie

Personal information
- Full name: Finn Fisher-Black
- Born: 21 December 2001 (age 24) Nelson, New Zealand
- Height: 1.89 m (6 ft 2 in)
- Weight: 73 kg (161 lb)

Cycling career
- Sport: Cycling
- Current team: Red Bull–Bora–Hansgrohe
- Disciplines: Road; Cyclo-cross; Track
- Role: Rider
- Rider type: Puncheur

Professional teams
- 2020–2021: Jumbo–Visma Development Team
- 2020–2021: Team Jumbo–Visma (development) (Note: Fisher-Black competed at the 2020 Vuelta a Burgos and Dwars door het Hageland with Team Jumbo–Visma, following the introduction of a UCI rule allowing riders registered with a development team to participate in UCI ProSeries or Class 1 events.)
- 2021–2024: UAE Team Emirates
- 2025–: Red Bull–Bora–Hansgrohe

Major wins
- One-day races and Classics National Time Trial Championships (2025, 2026)

Finn Fisher-Black (born 21 December 2001) is a New Zealand professional racing cyclist, who currently rides for UCI WorldTeam Red Bull–Bora–Hansgrohe. His older sister is fellow racing cyclist Niamh Fisher-Black.

== Early life ==
Fisher-Black was educated at Nelson College from 2015 to 2017.

== Career ==
Fisher-Black started the 2021 season off by defending his National Under-23 time trial title. If the elite and Under-23 results were combined Fisher-Black would've won by 9 seconds. After a crash in Le Samyn ruled him out of contention he set his sights on the Istrian Spring Trophy. Finn started strong with a 6th in the prologue and a 3rd in stage 2 however when it came to the last stage Fisher-Black was 1 second behind in the overall. His team worked hard and Fisher-Black gained enough bonus seconds at an intermediate sprint to gain the virtual lead. With his team controlling the rest of the stage Fisher-Black managed to win overall. In the 2021 Tour of Belgium Fisher-Black managed a 3rd in the Stage 3 time trial 18 seconds behind winner Remco Evenepoel he then held his fourth place in the Overall classification till the end of the race.

On 21 July 2021 UAE Team Emirates announced Fisher-Black would join their team immediately and race for them through till 2024. His first race in the team's colours was Prueba Villafranca de Ordizia, where he finished 67th. In 2022, he broke his leg in a crash in the Boucles de la Mayenne.

Fisher-Black claimed his first professional victory by winning the opening stage of the Giro di Sicilia in April 2023. He said of the victory: “My job was to pull into the bottom of the climb, but I looked back at one point and no one was there and the DS on the radio just told me to go as hard as I could...I didn't believe I could win until I saw the line...I kept looking back, and I could see the group just behind me. It was only 100m before the line when I realised I'd get there before them. It wasn't the plan, I'm still in shock”. He won the best young rider jersey in the same race after coming in eighth place on the final stage.

In September 2023, Fisher-Black finished second on stage 16 of the Vuelta a Espana, 43 seconds behind Jonas Vingegaard. Fisher-Black said of the result: “When Jonas attacked my idea was to go to the front and push the group on...When I looked back the group wasn't there so the DS [directeur sportif] told me to push and try and catch. It's a nice personal result for me, but the main goal over the next days is to help the guys for the GC.”

Fisher-Black won the 2025 and 2026 New Zealand time trial championships. He said of his 2026 win: “It is an extra bit of motivation in Europe on the World Tour to pull on this jersey in the TT, especially in a Grand Tour, you can look down and see the fern and what it represents...It is a special jersey for me and my team - Red Bull love to have a national jersey in the kit".

In August 2026, Fisher-Black, racing for Red Bull-Bora-Hansgrohe, came second overall in the Tour de Pologne 10 seconds behind the winner Marco Brenner. After the initial three flat stages, Fisher-Black came eighth, then seventh, then eighth on the more hilly stages four to six. He then came second in the stage seven time trial to place him on the podium in second place overall. Fisher-Black said of the result: "On the hilly stages, I was always right up there at the front, which gave me a good starting position for the time trial – something we’d had our eye on from the very beginning. I can be satisfied with the result, especially after a year that hasn’t been entirely straightforward, with a few ups and downs. I hope that Poland marks the start of a strong rest of the season".

== Major results ==
=== Road ===
2017
National Novice Championships

1st Road race
1st Time trial

2018
1st Time trial, National Junior Championships
2nd Time trial, Oceania Junior Championships
2019
Oceania Junior Championships

1st Road race
1st Time trial

10th Time trial, UCI World Junior Championships
2020
National Under-23 Championships

1st Road race
1st Time trial

1st Mountains classification, New Zealand Cycle Classic
2021
1st Time trial, National Under-23 Championships
1st Overall Istrian Spring Trophy
2nd Overall New Zealand Cycle Classic

1st Stages 1 (TTT) & 4

4th Overall Tour of Belgium
4th Gravel and Tar Classic
2022
5th Time trial, National Championships
2023 (1 pro win)
4th Overall Giro di Sicilia

1st Young rider classification
1st Stage 1

2024 (3)
1st Muscat Classic
1st Stage 3 Vuelta a Asturias
1st Stage 3 (TTT) Paris–Nice
3rd Overall Tour of Oman

1st Points classification
1st Young rider classification
1st Stage 2

3rd Overall Vuelta a Burgos
3rd Overall AlUla Tour
10th Giro dell'Appennino
2025 (1)
1st Time trial, National Championships
3rd Overall Tour Down Under
6th Overall UAE Tour
10th Cadel Evans Great Ocean Road Race
2026 (1)
1st Time trial, National Championships
2nd Overall Tour de Pologne

==== Grand Tour general classification results timeline ====
Grand Tour	2023	2024	2025	2026
Giro d'Italia	—	—	—	—
Tour de France	—	—	—	—
Vuelta a España	40	—	84	52

Legend
—	Did not compete
DNF	Did not finish

=== Track ===
2018
1st Team pursuit, UCI World Junior Championships
Oceania Championships

1st Scratch
2nd Points race
2nd Individual pursuit
2nd Team pursuit
3rd Madison

2019
National Championships

2nd Team pursuit
3rd Madison

=== Cyclo-cross ===
2016
1st National Junior Championships
