= Bart Lemmen =

Dutch cyclist

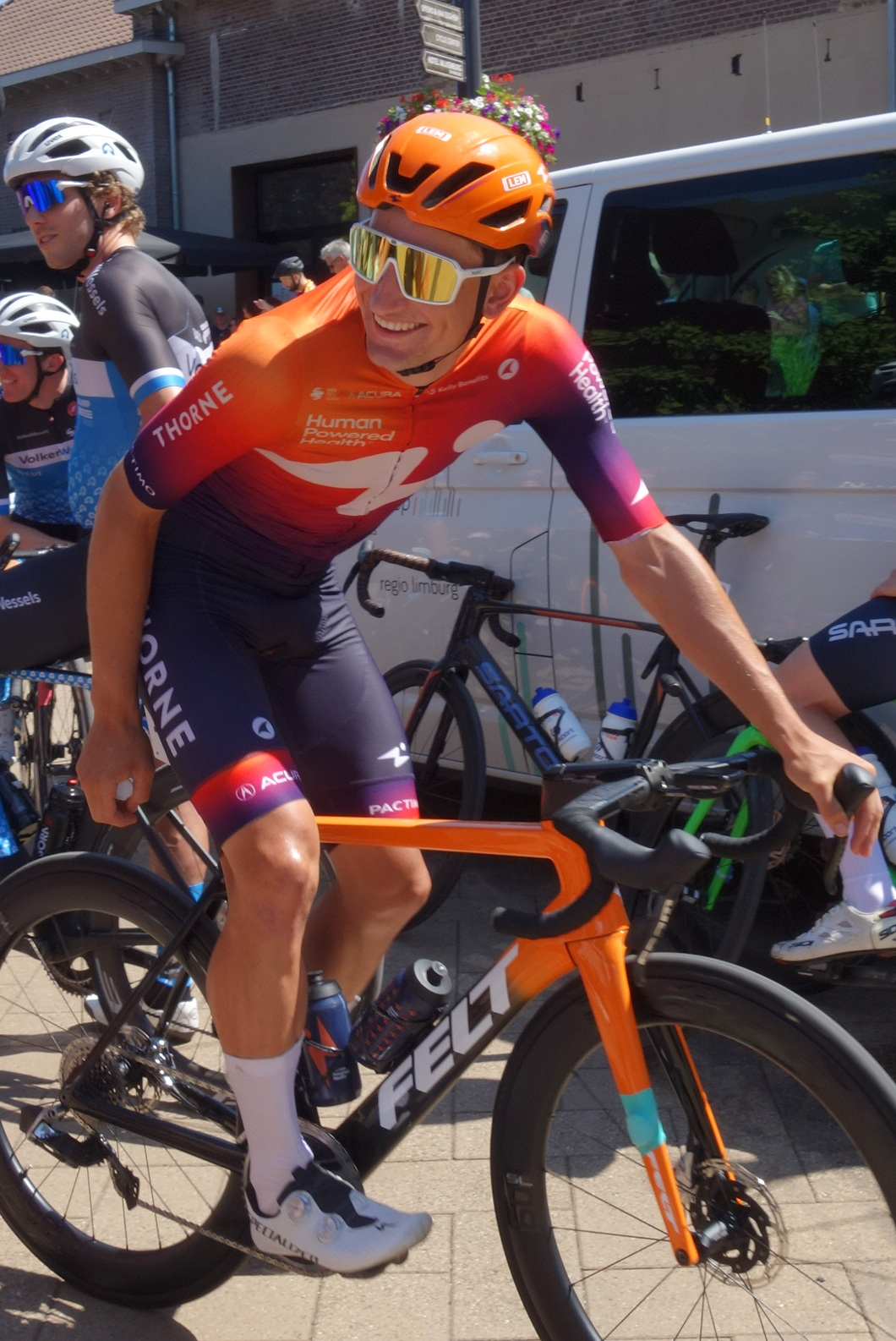
- Bart Lemmen in 2023

Personal information
- Born: 14 October 1995 (age 31) Utrecht, Netherlands
- Height: 1.80 m (5 ft 11 in)

Cycling career
- Sport: Cycling
- Current team: Visma–Lease a Bike
- Discipline: Road
- Role: Rider

Amateur team
- 2018–2021: WV West Frisia

Professional teams
- 2022: VolkerWessels Cycling Team
- 2023: Human Powered Health
- 2024–: Visma–Lease a Bike

Bart Lemmen (born 14 October 1995) is a Dutch racing cyclist, who currently rides for UCI WorldTeam Visma–Lease a Bike.

Lemmen started his cycling career relatively late, after graduating Dutch Royal Military Academy and working as an officer in the Royal Netherlands Air Force as a platoon commander in airfield protection, rising to the rank of captain.

In June 2024 he was a late addition to the Visma–Lease a Bike team for the 2024 Tour de France when Sepp Kuss did not recover sufficiently from COVID-19.

== Major results ==
2021
1st Eurode Omloop
Arden Challenge

1st Stages 1 & 5

2022
1st Ton Dolmans Trofee
3rd Stadsprijs Geraardsbergen
4th Road race, National Road Championships
5th Overall Kreiz Breizh Elites

1st Stage 4

7th Overall Okolo Slovenska
7th Overall Tour du Loir-et-Cher
10th Volta Limburg Classic
2023
4th Road race, National Road Championships
5th Overall Okolo Slovenska
5th Giro della Città Metropolitana di Reggio Calabria
8th Circuito de Getxo
2024
2nd Overall Tour of Norway
5th Overall Tour Down Under
5th Coppa Bernocchi
10th Overall UAE Tour
2025
1st Stage 3 (TTT) Paris–Nice
2nd Overall Okolo Slovenska
2026 (1 pro win)
5th Overall Tour de Pologne

1st Stage 4

5th Muscat Classic
10th Overall Tour de Suisse

=== Grand Tour general classification results timeline ===
Grand Tour	2024	2025
Giro d'Italia	—	42
Tour de France	70	—
Vuelta a España	—	—
