= Dries De Pooter =

Belgian cyclist

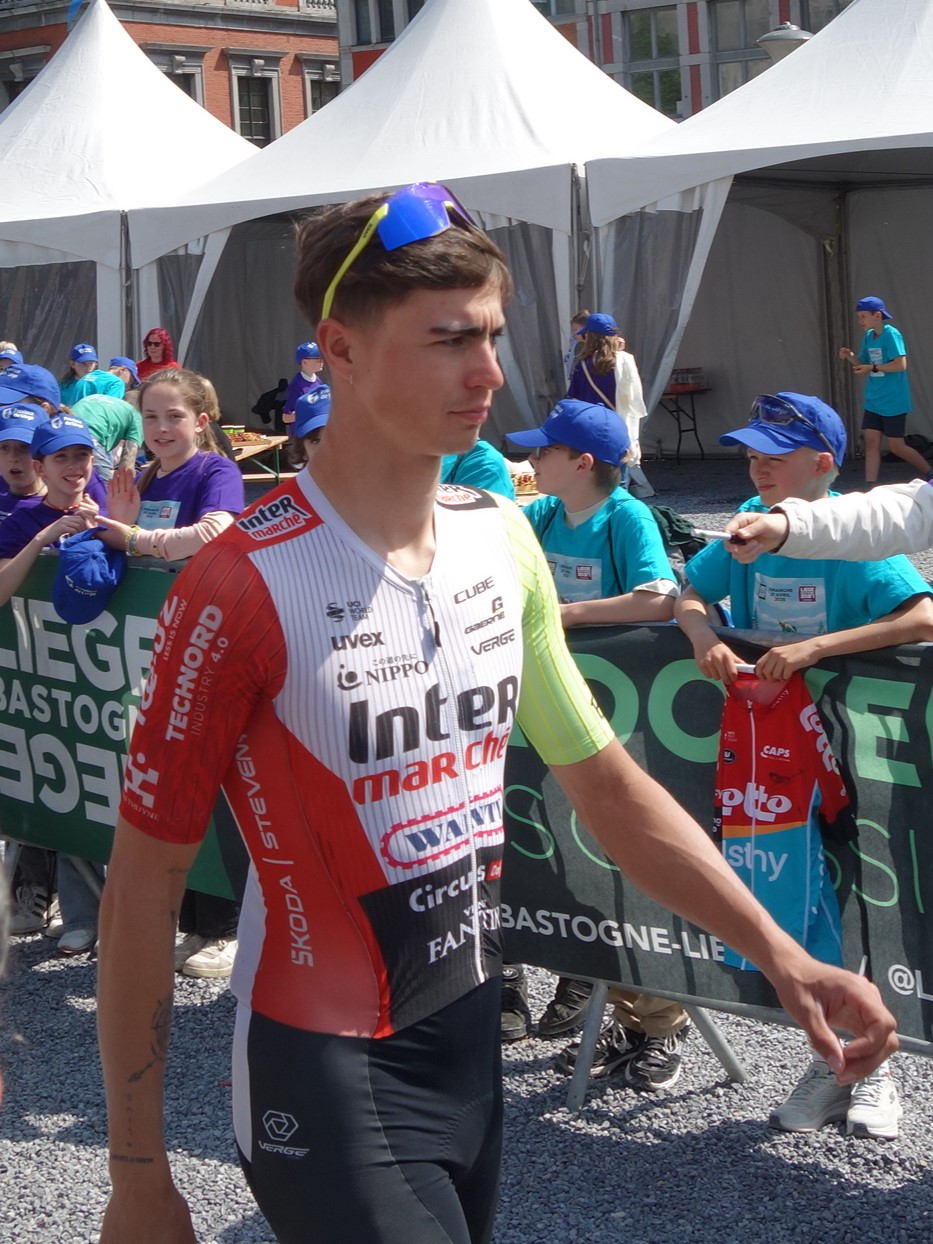
- De Pooter at the 2025 Liège–Bastogne–Liège

Personal information
- Nickname: Genghis of Geel
- Born: 8 November 2002 (age 23) Geel, Belgium
- Height: 1.81 m (5 ft 11 in)
- Weight: 65 kg (143 lb)

Cycling career
- Sport: Cycling
- Current team: Team Jayco–AlUla
- Discipline: Road
- Role: Rider

Amateur team
- 2019–2020: Acrog–Pauwels Sauzen

Professional teams
- 2021: SEG Racing Academy
- 2021: Intermarché–Wanty–Gobert Matériaux (stagiaire)
- 2022: Hagens Berman Axeon
- 2022: Intermarché–Wanty–Gobert Matériaux (stagiaire)
- 2023–2025: Intermarché–Circus–Wanty
- 2026–: Team Jayco–AlUla

Dries De Pooter (born 8 November 2002) is a Belgian racing cyclist, who currently rides for UCI WorldTeam Team Jayco–AlUla.

== Major results ==
2019
5th Overall Vuelta Ribera del Duero
2020
1st Road race, National Junior Road Championships
2021
4th Road race, National Under-23 Road Championships
7th Omloop der Kempen
7th Ster van Zwolle
2022
1st Stage 1 Flanders Tomorrow Tour
8th Trofej Umag
10th Liège–Bastogne–Liège Espoirs
2025
7th Overall Tour de Kyushu

1st Stage 2

=== Grand Tour general classification results timeline ===
Grand Tour	2024	2025
Giro d'Italia	106	—
Tour de France	—	—
Vuelta a España	—	128

Legend
—	Did not compete
DNF	Did not finish
