= Thomas Pesenti =

Italian cyclist (born 1999)

Personal information
- Born: 16 October 1999 (age 27) Fidenza, Italy
- Height: 1.69 m (5 ft 7 in)
- Weight: 59 kg (130 lb)

Cycling career
- Sport: Cycling
- Current team: Team Polti VisitMalta
- Discipline: Road
- Role: Rider
- Rider type: Climber

Amateur teams
- 2012–2013: SC Torrile
- 2014–2015: GS Parmense
- 2016–2017: Noceto Nial
- 2018: Petroli Firenze Hoppla Maserati

Professional teams
- 2019–2023: Team Beltrami TSA–Hopplà–Petroli Firenze
- 2024: JCL Team UKYO
- 2025: Soudal–Quick-Step Devo Team
- 2026–: Team Polti VisitMalta

Thomas Pesenti (born 16 October 1999) is an Italian cyclist, who currently rides for UCI ProTeam Team Polti VisitMalta.

== Major results ==
2017
1st Mountains classification, Giro della Lunigiana
2021
6th Trofeo Piva
2022
1st Giro del Medio Brenta
Visegrad 4 Bicycle Race

1st GP Slovakia
2nd Kerekparverseny

5th Per sempre Alfredo
2023
9th Overall Gemenc Grand Prix
9th Giro dell'Appennino
9th Giro del Medio Brenta
2024
2nd Overall Tour de Langkawi
3rd Overall Tour of Bulgaria
9th Overall Giro della Regione Friuli Venezia Giulia
10th Overall Settimana Internazionale di Coppi e Bartali
10th Giro della Romagna
2025
3rd Road race, National Road Championships
4th Overall Alpes Isère Tour
10th Overall Circuit des Ardennes
2026
2nd Giro dell'Appennino
3rd Overall Tour of Hainan
4th Overall Settimana Internazionale di Coppi e Bartali

=== Grand Tour general classification results timeline ===
| Grand Tour | 2026 |
|---|---|
| Giro d'Italia | 71 |
| Tour de France | — |
| Vuelta a España | — |

Legend
| — | Did not compete |
| DNF | Did not finish |
