= Intermarché–Wanty =

Belgian cycling team

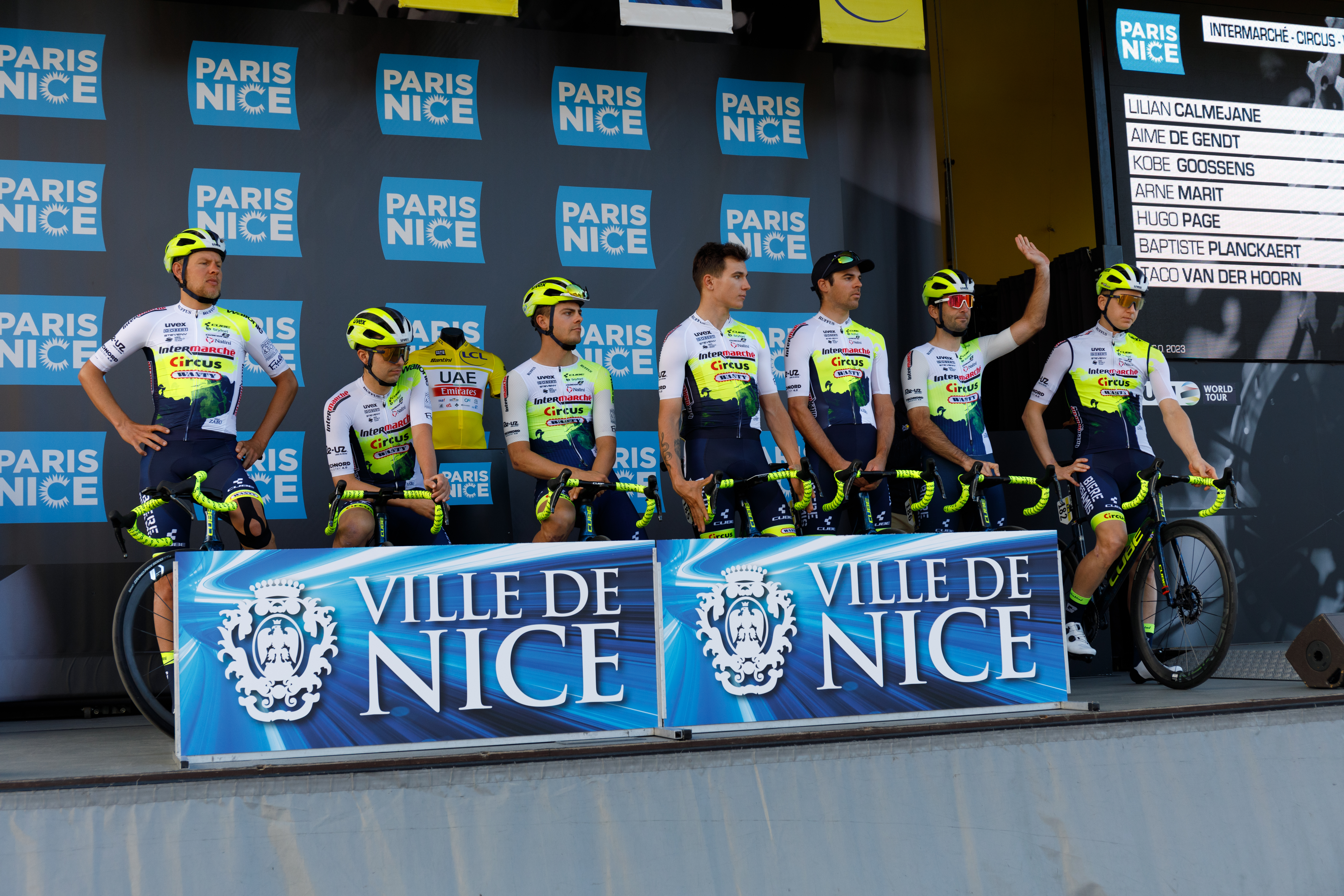
- The team at the 2023 Paris–Nice

Team information
- UCI code: WIL (2008–2010); VWA (2011); ACC (2012); AJW (2013); WGG (2014–2019); CWG (2020); IWG (2021–2022); ICW (2023); IWA (2024–2025)
- Registered: Belgium
- Founded: 2008
- Disbanded: 2025
- Discipline: Road
- Status: UCI WorldTeam
- Bicycles: Cube
- Website: Team home page

Key personnel
- General manager: Jean-François Bourlaert
- Team managers: Aike Visbeek; Pieter Vanspeybrouck

Team name history
- 2008 2009–2010 2011 2012 2013 2014–2018 2019 2020 2021–2022 2023 2024–2025: Willems Verandas Continental Team; Verandas Willems; Veranda's Willems–Accent; Accent.jobs–Willems Verandas; Accent Jobs–Wanty; Wanty–Groupe Gobert; Wanty–Gobert; Circus–Wanty Gobert; Intermarché–Wanty–Gobert Matériaux; Intermarché–Circus–Wanty; Intermarché–Wanty
Intermarché–Wanty jersey
Jersey

Intermarché–Wanty (UCI team code: IWA) was a Belgian professional road cycling team that competed as a UCI WorldTeam, the highest level in men's professional cycling. The team was sponsored by the French supermarket chain Intermarché and Belgian engineering firm Groupe Wanty.

Founded in 2008, the team spent over a decade competing in the UCI Continental Circuits and select UCI WorldTour events as a wildcard entrant. In September 2020, it acquired a WorldTeam licence from the disbanded CCC Pro Team, allowing it to compete full-time in the WorldTour from the 2021 season onward.

The team ceased to exist at the end of 2025 and merged with Lotto to form Lotto–Intermarché.

== Team roster ==
As of 7 January 2025.

Rider	Date of birth
Huub Artz (NED)	14 May 2002 (age 24)
Louis Barré (FRA)	6 April 2000 (age 26)
Kamiel Bonneu (BEL)	1 August 1999 (age 27)
Vito Braet (BEL)	2 November 2000 (age 25)
Francesco Busatto (ITA)	1 November 2002 (age 23)
Kevin Colleoni (ITA)	11 November 1999 (age 26)
Dries De Pooter (BEL)	8 November 2002 (age 23)
Alexy Faure Prost (FRA)	22 April 2004 (age 22)
Biniam Girmay (ERI)	2 April 2000 (age 26)
Kobe Goossens (BEL)	29 April 1996 (age 30)
Alexander Kamp (DEN)	14 December 1993 (age 32)
Gerben Kuypers (BEL)	1 February 2000 (age 26)
Arne Marit (BEL)	21 January 1999 (age 27)
Louis Meintjes (RSA)	21 February 1992 (age 34)

Rider	Date of birth
Hugo Page (FRA)	24 July 2001 (age 25)
Tom Paquot (BEL)	22 September 1999 (age 26)
Simone Petilli (ITA)	4 May 1993 (age 33)
Adrien Petit (FRA)	26 September 1990 (age 35)
Laurenz Rex (BEL)	15 December 1999 (age 26)
Lorenzo Rota (ITA)	23 May 1995 (age 31)
Jonas Rutsch (GER)	24 January 1998 (age 28)
Dion Smith (NZL)	3 March 1993 (age 33)
Gerben Thijssen (BEL)	21 June 1998 (age 28)
Luca Van Boven (BEL)	6 January 2000 (age 26)
Taco van der Hoorn (NED)	4 December 1993 (age 32)
Gijs Van Hoecke (BEL)	12 November 1991 (age 34)
Roel van Sintmaartensdijk (NED)	8 May 2001 (age 25)
Georg Zimmermann (GER)	11 October 1997 (age 28)

== National and world champions ==
2021
Estonia Time Trial, Rein Taaramäe
2022
Estonia Time Trial, Rein Taaramäe
Eritrea Time Trial, Biniam Girmay
2023
Estonia Time Trial, Rein Taaramäe
2024
Estonia Time Trial, Rein Taaramäe
