= Team Picnic–PostNL (men's team) =

Dutch men's cycling team

Team information
- UCI code: TPP
- Registered: Netherlands (2008–2014); Germany (2015–2021); Netherlands (2022–present)
- Founded: 2008
- Discipline: Road
- Status: UCI Professional Continental (2008–2012); UCI WorldTeam (2013–)
- Bicycles: Koga (2008–2011); Felt (2012); Giant (2013–2018); Cervélo (2019–2020); Scott (2021–2024); Lapierre (2025–)
- Components: Shimano
- Website: Team home page

Key personnel
- General manager: Iwan Spekenbrink

Team name history
| 2005 | Shimano–Memory Corp |
| 2006–2011 | Skil Shimano |
| 2012 | Project 1t4i |
| 2012–2013 | Argos–Shimano |
| 2014 | Giant–Shimano |
| 2015–2016 | Team Giant–Alpecin |
| 2017–2020 | Team Sunweb |
| 2021–2023 | Team DSM |
| 2023 | Team dsm–firmenich |
| 2024 | Team dsm–firmenich PostNL |
| 2025– | Team Picnic–PostNL |

Team Picnic–PostNL (UCI team code: TPP) is a Dutch professional cycling team, competing at UCI WorldTeam level. The team is managed by Iwan Spekenbrink. The title sponsors of the team are online supermarket Picnic and the Dutch mail, parcel and e-commerce company PostNL.

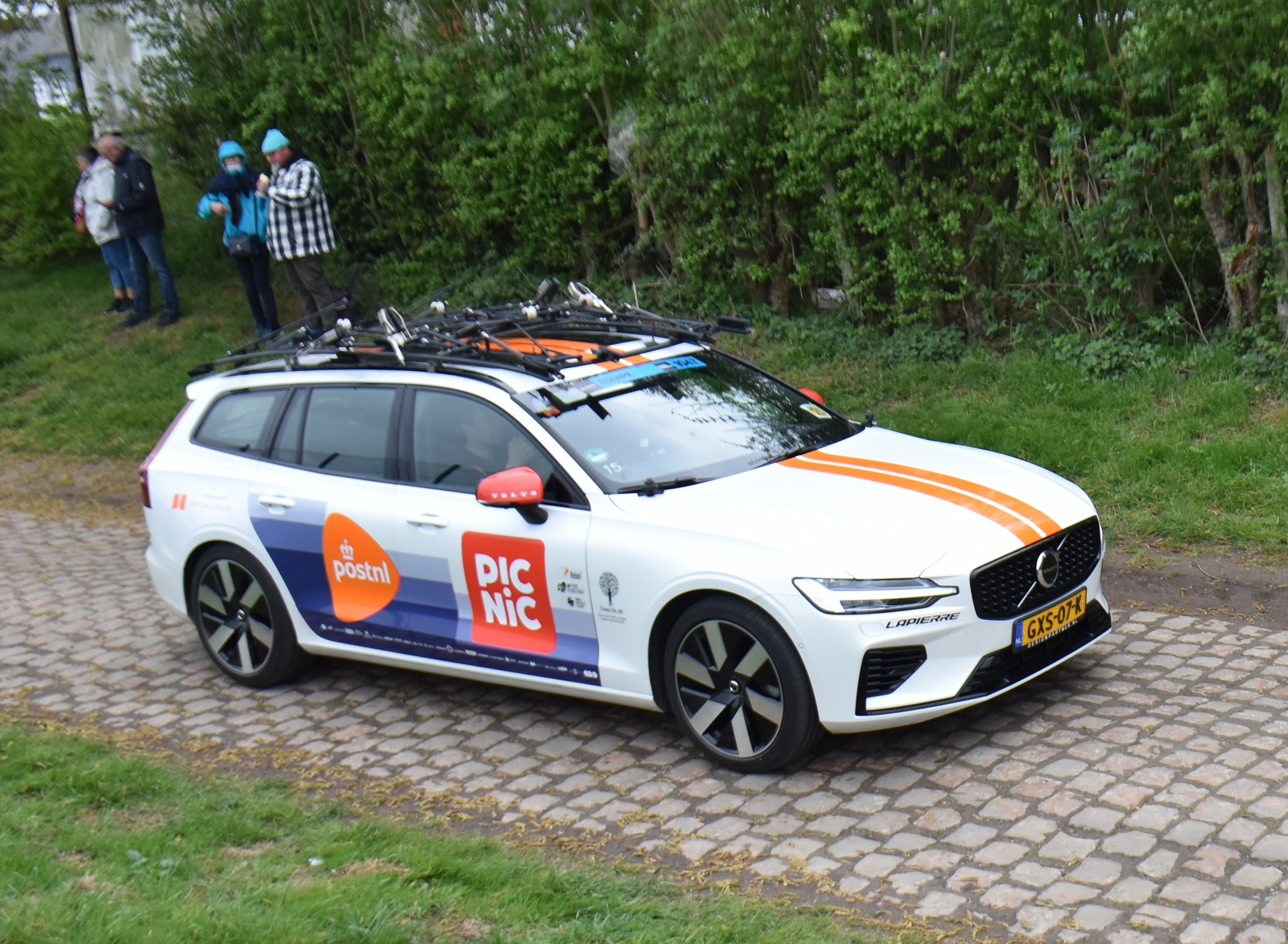
A team car at the 2025 Paris-Roubaix

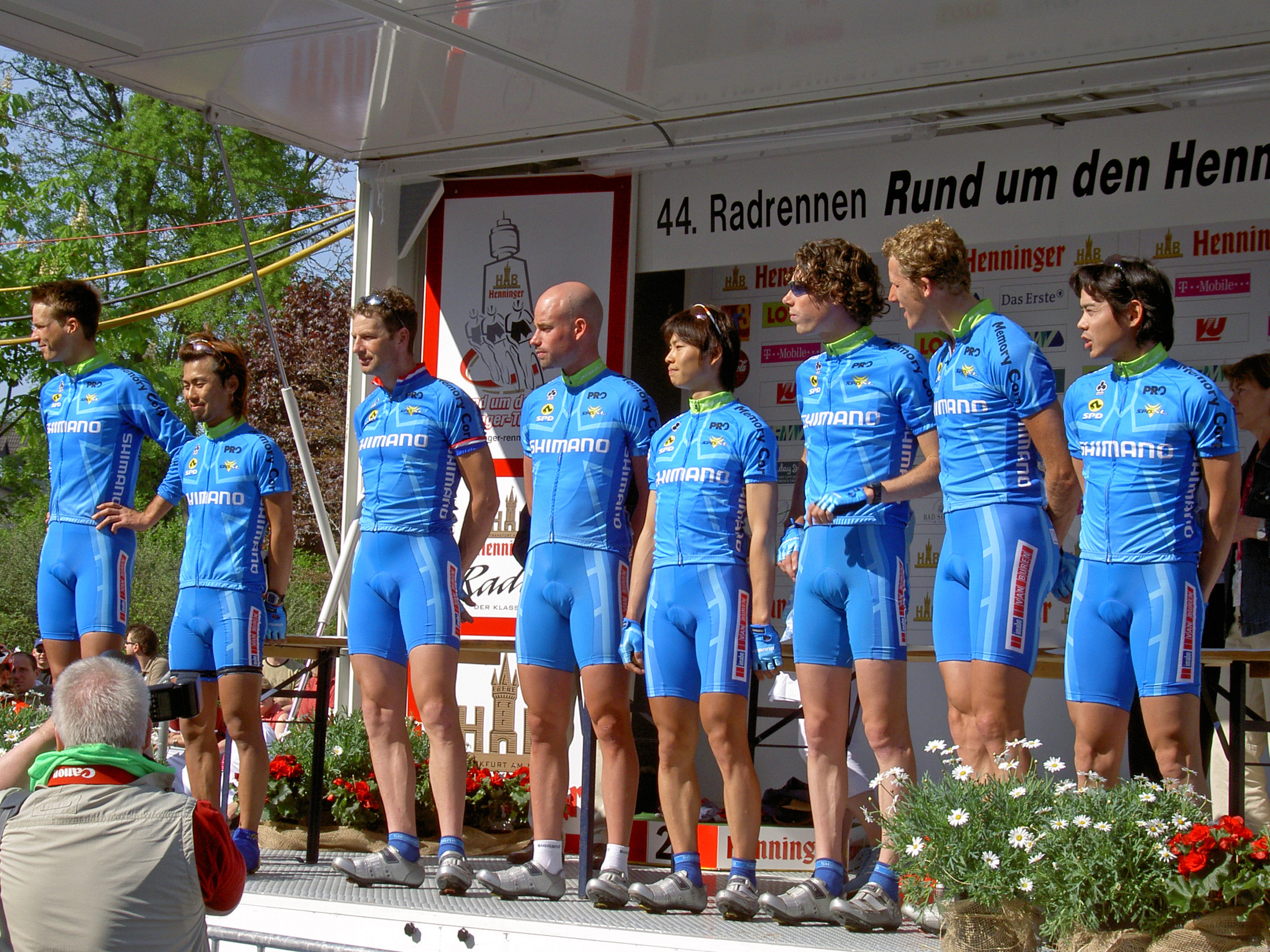
The team in 2005

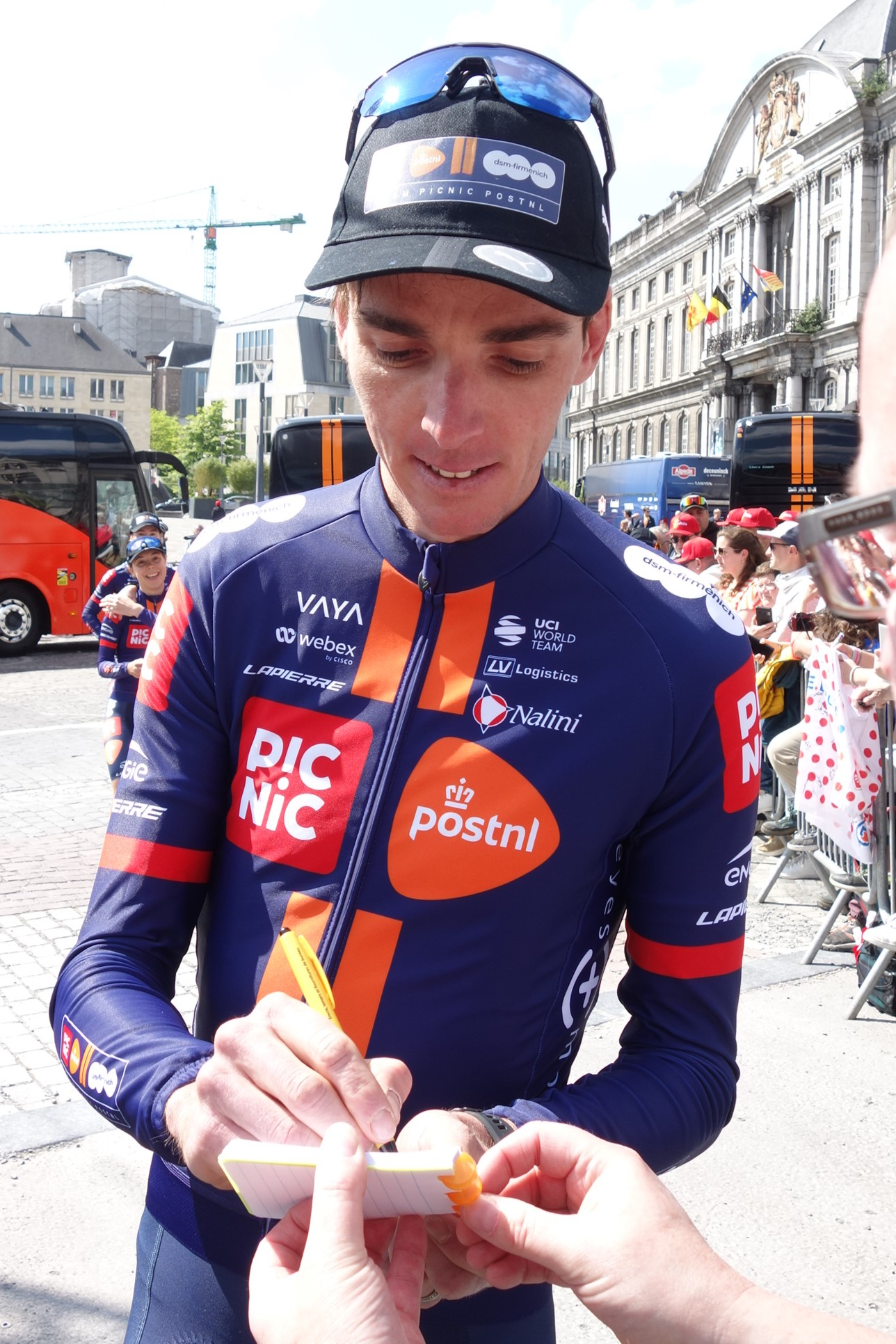
Romain Bardet at the team presentation for 2025 Liège–Bastogne–Liège

== History ==
The team was founded in 2008 when Iwan Spekenbrink founded a small second division professional team under the name Team Skil-Shimano. Thanks to aggressive strategies during Paris–Nice in 2008 and 2009, the team was awarded a wildcard for the 2009 Tour de France, making it their first appearance in a Grand Tour.

In 2010, Team Skil-Shimano added a Women's program. Operating under the same umbrella and within the same structure; the idea of equality was paramount with the focus on one organisation. Around the same time, the team became an ambassador of Trees for All: and became the first in the peloton to compensate towards the CO_{2} emissions generated by its operation.

In 2011, the team took its first Grand Tour win with sprint success on stage seven of the Vuelta a España, as Marcel Kittel delivered after an impressive lead-out from the team. This can be recognized as the starting point for the team's reputation as becoming one of the best sprint trains in the peloton.

After losing its sponsors at the end of 2011, the team adopted the name "Project 1T4i", standing for "team spirit, inspiration, integrity, improvement and innovation", until a new sponsor was secured. Ahead of the Tour of Flanders on 1 April 2012, the team became Team Argos-Shimano following the announcement of a three-year naming rights contract with the Argos North Sea Group, an oil company based in the Netherlands.

In 2012, the team received their second wildcard invitation to the 2012 Tour de France, along with three French-registered teams: Cofidis, Team Europcar and Saur–Sojasun.

In December 2012 it was announced that the team would compete at the World Tour level for the 2013 season.

Two years after the team's first Grand Tour win, they achieved their first major success in the Tour de France. Following an impressive lead-out and sprint to the line, Marcel Kittel took the team's first Tour de France stage win at the opening stage on the island of Corsica, and with it the famous yellow jersey.

In September 2014 German shampoo manufacturer Alpecin announced that they would co-sponsor the team alongside Giant for the 2015 season. In December 2014 Sunweb (a Dutch-owned international tour operator) was announced as a new major sponsor of the team, signing a 2-year deal.

In 2015, the team created history by winning its first cycling Monument with John Degenkolb at Milano-Sanremo. Following on from success at Milano-Sanremo, the team collected their second Monument in as many months after winning Paris-Roubaix, otherwise known as the Hell of the North.

On 23 January 2016 during training in Spain, six members of the team (John Degenkolb, Warren Barguil, Max Walscheid, Chad Haga, Fredrik Ludvigsson and Ramon Sinkeldam) were hit by a car that was driven by an English tourist, who turned the wrong way into on-coming traffic. For a time there was serious concern about some of them not only returning to ride in the 2016 season, but whether or not the accident might end their careers. Fortunately everyone recovered.

On the first rest day of the 2016 Tour de France, the team announced that Sunweb would become a named sponsor of the team for the 2017 season, and the team would move their registration from the Netherlands to Germany.

At the beginning of 2017, Team Sunweb launched its Development Program alongside its Men's and Women's programs with the goal of sourcing and developing young international talents, bringing them up to the WorldTour. By 2025, the Development program has already promoted its 22nd talent to the pro's.

In 2017, Team Sunweb won its first Grand Tour: the 2017 Giro d'Italia with Tom Dumoulin. At the 2017 Tour de France, the team won four stages and two major jerseys: Warren Barguil won the Mountains classification and Combativity Award while reaching 10th overall, and Michael Matthews won the Points classification. In September that year, the team collected three world titles in Bergen, Norway. On 17 September, both the Men's and Women's programs become team time trial world champions. 3 days later, Tom Dumoulin writes history once again as the first Dutchman ever to become a world champion in the individual time trial.

In 2018, the team continued to push for a cleaner sport and becomes the first WorldTour team with an additional and independent anti-doping program, in cooperation with the Dutch National Anti-Doping agency ("Dopingautoriteit"). In 2018 the team rode in support of Tom Dumoulin, who finished second in both the 2018 Giro d'Italia and the 2018 Tour de France.

From the 2021 season, DSM took over title sponsorship of the team, with the name changing to Team dsm-firmenich in response to a company merger shortly before the 2023 Tour de France.

In 2024, PostNL joined dsm-firmenich as title partner. At the 2024 Tour de France, Romain Bardet claimed the first yellow jersey of the race by winning the opening stage after a two-man breakaway with teammate Frank van den Broek, a Development Program graduate who made his debut at the biggest race in cycling.

From the 2025 season, the online Dutch supermarket Picnic replaced dsm-firmenich as title sponsor. The official team name became Team Picnic–PostNL, dsm-firmenich however remained an important partner of the team.

== Team roster ==
As of 13 March 2026.

| Rider | Date of birth |
|---|---|
| Warren Barguil (FRA) | 28 October 1991 (age 34) |
| Pavel Bittner (CZE) | 29 October 2002 (age 23) |
| Dillon Corkery (IRL) | 12 February 1999 (age 27) |
| John Degenkolb (GER) | 7 January 1989 (age 37) |
| Robbe Dhondt (BEL) | 25 June 2004 (age 22) |
| Matthew Dinham (AUS) | 9 April 2000 (age 26) |
| Nils Eekhoff (NED) | 23 January 1998 (age 28) |
| Alexy Faure Prost (FRA) | 22 April 2004 (age 22) |
| Sean Flynn (GBR) | 2 March 2000 (age 26) |
| Mattia Gaffuri (ITA) | 4 July 1999 (age 27) |
| Chris Hamilton (AUS) | 18 May 1995 (age 31) |
| Fabio Jakobsen (NED) | 31 August 1996 (age 30) |

| Rider | Date of birth |
|---|---|
| Timo de Jong (NED) | 28 March 1999 (age 27) |
| James Knox (GBR) | 4 November 1995 (age 30) |
| Gijs Leemreize (NED) | 23 October 1999 (age 26) |
| Enzo Leijnse (NED) | 16 July 2001 (age 25) |
| Niklas Märkl (GER) | 3 March 1999 (age 27) |
| Tim Naberman (NED) | 11 May 1999 (age 27) |
| Max Poole (GBR) | 1 March 2003 (age 23) |
| Timo Roosen (NED) | 11 January 1993 (age 33) |
| Julius van den Berg (NED) | 23 October 1996 (age 29) |
| Frank van den Broek (NED) | 28 December 2000 (age 25) |
| Casper van Uden (NED) | 22 July 2001 (age 25) |
| Bram Welten (NED) | 29 March 1997 (age 29) |

== National and world champions ==
2005
Japan Road Race, Hidenori Nodera
2008
Japan Road Race, Hidenori Nodera
2012
Japan Road Race, Yukihiro Doi
2014
Dutch Time Trial, Tom Dumoulin
2015
Austria Time Trial, Georg Preidler
2016
Dutch Time Trial, Tom Dumoulin
2017
Dutch Time Trial, Tom Dumoulin
Austria Time Trial, Georg Preidler
Dutch Road Race, Ramon Sinkeldam
World Team Time Trial
World Time Trial, Tom Dumoulin
