= 2022 Ineos Grenadiers season =

INEOS Grenadiers
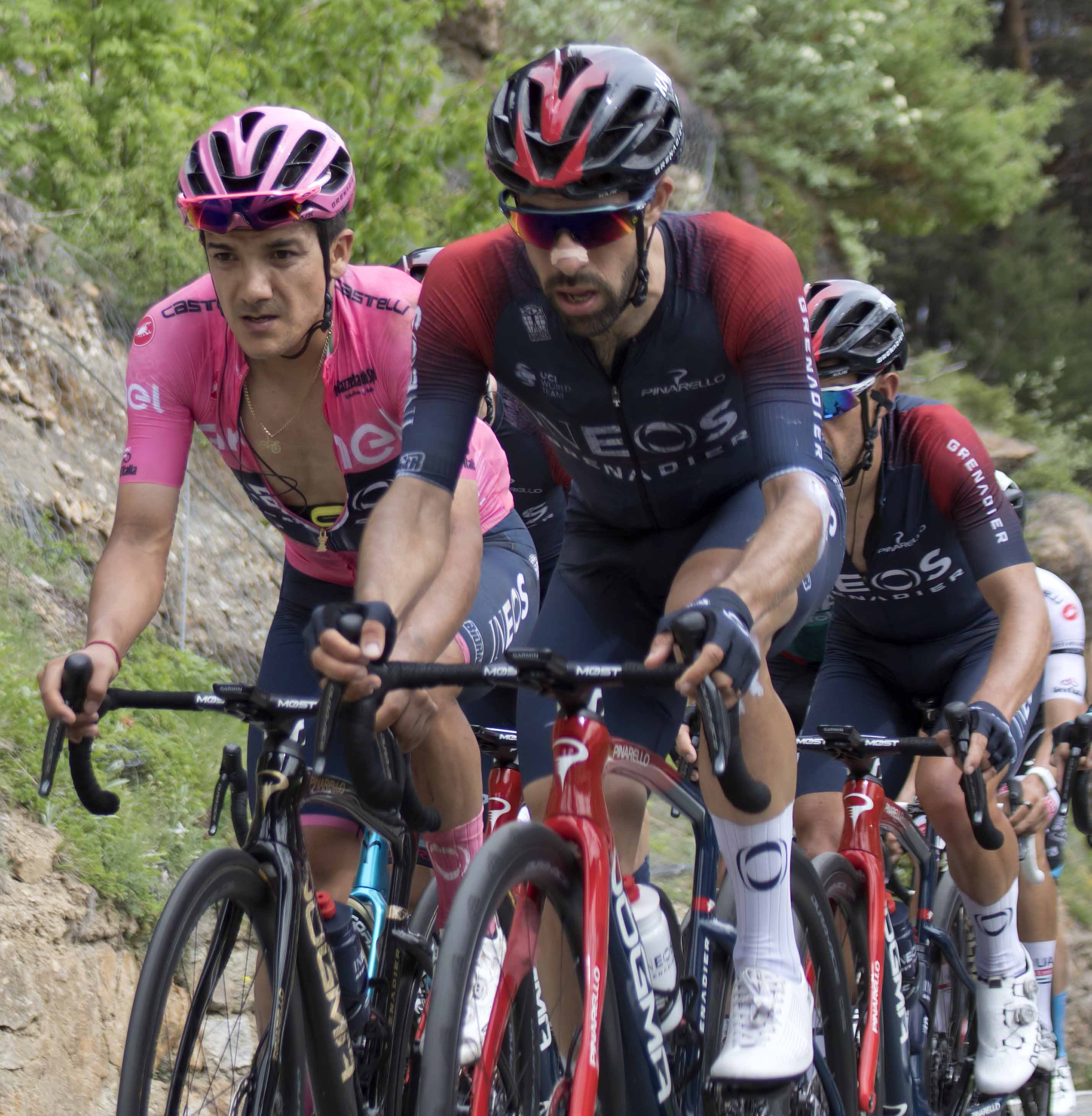
- Ineos Grenadiers on Stage 15 Giro d'Italia
- UCI code: IGD
- Status: UCI WorldTeam
- Manager: Dave Brailsford (GBR)
- Main sponsor(s): Ineos
- Based: National Cycling Centre, Manchester; England
- Bicycles: Pinarello
- Groupset: Shimano

Season victories
- One-day races: 3
- Stage race overall: 6
- Stage race stages: 14
- World Championships: 1
- National Championships: 3
- Jersey

The 2022 season for INEOS Grenadiers is the 13th season in the team's existence, all of which have been as a UCI WorldTeam. This is the fourth season with Ineos as the title sponsor and the second full season with the current name. They use Pinarello bicycles, Shimano drivetrain, Shimano wheels and Bioracer clothing.

== Team roster ==
As of 3 January 2022.

Rider	Date of birth
Andrey Amador (CRC)	29 August 1986 (aged 35)
Egan Bernal (COL)	13 January 1997 (aged 24)
Richard Carapaz (ECU)	29 May 1993 (aged 28)
Jonathan Castroviejo (ESP)	27 April 1987 (aged 34)
Laurens De Plus (BEL)	4 September 1995 (aged 26)
Eddie Dunbar (IRL)	1 September 1996 (aged 25)
Omar Fraile (ESP)	17 July 1990 (aged 31)
Filippo Ganna (ITA)	25 July 1996 (aged 25)
Tao Geoghegan Hart (GBR)	30 March 1995 (aged 26)
Ethan Hayter (GBR)	18 September 1998 (aged 23)
Kim Heiduk (GER)	3 March 2000 (aged 21)
Michał Kwiatkowski (POL)	2 June 1990 (aged 31)
Daniel Martínez (COL)	April 25, 1996 (aged 25)
Jhonatan Narváez (ECU)	4 March 1997 (aged 24)
Tom Pidcock (GBR)	30 July 1999 (aged 22)
Luke Plapp (AUS)	25 December 2000 (aged 21)

Rider	Date of birth
Richie Porte (AUS)	30 January 1985 (aged 36)
Salvatore Puccio (ITA)	31 August 1989 (aged 32)
Brandon Rivera (COL)	21 March 1996 (aged 25)
Carlos Rodriguez (ESP)	2 February 2001 (aged 20)
Luke Rowe (GBR)	10 March 1990 (aged 31)
Magnus Sheffield (USA)	19 April 2002 (aged 19)
Pavel Sivakov (Note: On 4 March, the UCI granted Sivakov's request to change nationalities from Russian to French, in light of the 2022 Russian invasion of Ukraine.) (FRA)	11 July 1997 (aged 24)
Ben Swift (GBR)	5 November 1987 (aged 34)
Geraint Thomas (GBR)	25 May 1986 (aged 35)
Ben Tulett (GBR)	26 August 2001 (aged 20)
Ben Turner (GBR)	28 May 1999 (aged 22)
Dylan van Baarle (NED)	21 May 1992 (aged 29)
Elia Viviani (ITA)	7 February 1989 (aged 32)
Cameron Wurf (AUS)	3 August 1983 (aged 38)
Adam Yates (GBR)	7 August 1992 (aged 29)

Riders who joined the team for the 2022 season

Rider	2021 team
Omar Fraile	Astana–Premier Tech
Kim Heiduk	neo-pro (Team Lotto–Kern Haus)
Luke Plapp	neo-pro (Inform TM Insight Make)
Magnus Sheffield	Rally Cycling
Ben Tulett	Alpecin–Fenix
Ben Turner	neo-pro (Trinity Racing)
Elia Viviani	Cofidis

Riders who left the team during or after the 2021 season

Rider	2022 team
Leonardo Basso	Astana Qazaqstan Team
Rohan Dennis	Team Jumbo–Visma
Owain Doull	EF Education–EasyPost
Michał Gołaś	Retired
Sebastián Henao	Astana Qazaqstan Team
Gianni Moscon	Astana Qazaqstan Team
Iván Sosa	Movistar Team

== Season victories ==
Date	Race	Competition	Rider	Country	Location	Ref.
6 February	Étoile de Bessèges, Stage 5 (ITT)	UCI Europe Tour	Filippo Ganna (ITA)	France	Alès	
6 February	Volta a la Comunitat Valenciana, Team classification	UCI ProSeries	(Note: The riders in the squad were Jonathan Castroviejo, Omar Fraile, Tao Geoghegan Hart, Carlos Rodriguez, Pavel Sivakov, Ben Swift, and Elia Viviani.)	Spain		
10 February	Tour de la Provence, Prologue (ITT)	UCI ProSeries	Filippo Ganna (ITA)	France	Berre-l'Étang	
11 February	Tour de la Provence, Stage 1	UCI ProSeries	Elia Viviani (ITA)	France	Les Saintes-Maries-de-la-Mer	
18 February	Vuelta a Andalucía, Stage 3	UCI ProSeries	Magnus Sheffield (USA)	Spain	Otura	
20 February	Volta ao Algarve, Team classification	UCI ProSeries	(Note: The riders in the squad were Jonathan Castroviejo, Ethan Hayter, Daniel Martínez, Tom Pidcock, Geraint Thomas, Ben Tulett, and Dylan van Baarle.)	Portugal		
7 March	Tirreno–Adriatico, Stage 1 (ITT)	UCI World Tour	Filippo Ganna (ITA)	Italy	Lido di Camaiore	
23 March	Settimana Internazionale di Coppi e Bartali, Stage 2	UCI Europe Tour	Ethan Hayter (GBR)	Italy	Longiano	
24 March	Settimana Internazionale di Coppi e Bartali, Stage 3	UCI Europe Tour	Ben Tulett (GBR)	San Marino	City of San Marino	
26 March	Settimana Internazionale di Coppi e Bartali, Overall	UCI Europe Tour	Eddie Dunbar (IRL)	Italy		
26 March	Settimana Internazionale di Coppi e Bartali, Points classification	UCI Europe Tour	Ethan Hayter (GBR)	Italy		
26 March	Settimana Internazionale di Coppi e Bartali, Young rider classification	UCI Europe Tour	Ben Tulett (GBR)	Italy		
26 March	Settimana Internazionale di Coppi e Bartali, Team classification	UCI Europe Tour	(Note: The riders in the squad were Laurens De Plus, Eddie Dunbar, Ethan Hayter, Salvatore Puccio, Geraint Thomas, Ben Tulett, and Cameron Wurf.)	Italy		
26 March	Volta a Catalunya, Stage 6	UCI World Tour	Richard Carapaz (ECU)	Spain	Costa Daurada (Cambrils)	
7 April	Tour of the Basque Country, Stage 4	UCI World Tour	Daniel Martínez (COL)	Spain	Ingeteam Parke Zamudio	
8 April	Tour of the Basque Country, Stage 5	UCI World Tour	Carlos Rodríguez (ESP)	Spain	Mallabia	
9 April	Tour of the Basque Country, Overall	UCI World Tour	Daniel Martínez (COL)	Spain		
9 April	Tour of the Basque Country, Points classification	UCI World Tour	Daniel Martínez (COL)	Spain		
9 April	Tour of the Basque Country, Team classification	UCI World Tour	(Note: The riders in the squad were Omar Fraile, Tao Geoghegan Hart, Daniel Martínez, Carlos Rodríguez, Geraint Thomas, Ben Tulett, and Adam Yates.)	Spain		
10 April	Amstel Gold Race	UCI World Tour	Michał Kwiatkowski (POL)	Netherlands	Valkenburg	
13 April	Brabantse Pijl	UCI ProSeries	Magnus Sheffield (USA)	Belgium	Overijse	
17 April	Paris-Roubaix	UCI World Tour	Dylan van Baarle (NED)	France	Roubaix	
26 April	Tour de Romandie, Prologue (ITT)	UCI World Tour	Ethan Hayter (GBR)	Switzerland	Lausanne	
28 April	Tour de Romandie, Stage 2	UCI World Tour	Ethan Hayter (GBR)	Switzerland	Échallens	
15 May	Tour de Hongrie, Overall	UCI Europe Tour	Eddie Dunbar (IRL)	Hungary		
25 May	Tour of Norway, Stage 2	UCI ProSeries	Ethan Hayter (GBR)	Norway	Geilo	
29 May	Tour of Norway, Team classification	UCI ProSeries	(Note: The riders in the squad were Andrey Amador, Tao Geoghegan Hart, Ethan Hayter, Luke Plapp, Luke Rowe, and Magnus Sheffield.)	Norway		
8 June	Critérium du Dauphiné, Stage 4 (ITT)	UCI World Tour	Filippo Ganna (ITA)	France	La Bâtie d'Urfé	
19 June	Tour de Suisse, Overall	UCI World Tour	Geraint Thomas (GBR)	Switzerland		
14 July	Tour de France, Stage 12	UCI World Tour	Tom Pidcock (GBR)	France	L'Alpe d'Huez	
5 August	Tour de Pologne, Overall	UCI World Tour	Ethan Hayter (GBR)	Poland		
6 August	Vuelta a Burgos, Overall	UCI ProSeries	Pavel Sivakov (FRA)	Spain		
17 August	Danmark Rundt, Stage 2 (ITT)	UCI ProSeries	Magnus Sheffield (USA)	Denmark	Assens	
20 August	Danmark Rundt, Youth classification	UCI ProSeries	Magnus Sheffield (USA)	Denmark		
27 August	Deutschland Tour, Stage 3	UCI ProSeries	Adam Yates (GBR)	Germany	Schauinsland	
1 September	Vuelta a España, Stage 12	UCI World Tour	Richard Carapaz (ECU)	Spain	Peñas Blancas	
3 September	Vuelta a España, Stage 14	UCI World Tour	Richard Carapaz (ECU)	Spain	Sierra de La Pandera	
8 September	Tour of Britain, Points classification	UCI ProSeries	Tom Pidcock (GBR)	United Kingdom		
8 September	Tour of Britain, Team classification	UCI ProSeries	(Note: The riders in the squad were Tom Pidcock, Omar Fraile, Andrey Amador, Richie Porte, Magnus Sheffield, and Michał Kwiatkowski.)	United Kingdom		
10 September	Vuelta a España, Stage 20	UCI World Tour	Richard Carapaz (ECU)	Spain	Puerto de Navacerrada	
11 September	Vuelta a España, Mountains classification	UCI World Tour	Richard Carapaz (ECU)	Spain		
15 September	Coppa Sabatini	UCI Europe Tour	Daniel Martínez (ECU)	Italy	Peccioli	

== National, Continental, and World Champions ==
Date	Discipline	Jersey	Rider	Country	Location	Ref.
16 January	Australian National Road Race Championships		Luke Plapp (AUS)	Australia	Buninyong	
30 January	World Cyclo-cross Championships		Tom Pidcock (GBR)	United States	Fayetteville	
10 February	Colombian National Time Trial Championships		Daniel Martínez (COL)	Colombia	La Virginia	
18 February	Ecuadorian National Time Trial Championships		Richard Carapaz (ECU)	Ecuador	Ciudad Mitad del Mundo	
20 August	European Mountain Bike Championships		Tom Pidcock (GBR)	Germany	Munich	
15 October	World Omnium Championships		Ethan Hayter (GBR)	France	Montigny-le-Bretonneux	
