= 2026 Tour of Holland =

2026 Eneco Tour
2026 UCI Europe Tour

Race details
- Dates: 13–18 October 2026
- Stages: 5 + Prologue
- Distance: 546.2 km (339.4 mi)
- Winning time: 11h 49' 26"

Results
Jersey awarded to the overall winner	Winner	Victor Campenaerts (BEL)	(Visma–Lease a Bike)
	Second	Wessel Mouris (NED)	(Unibet Rose Rockets)
	Third	Finn Fisher-Black (NZ)	(Red Bull–Bora–Hansgrohe)
Jersey awarded to the points classification winner	Points	Jakob Söderqvist (SWE)	(Lidl–Trek)
Jersey awarded to the young rider classification winner	Young rider	Steffen De Schuyteneer (BEL)	(Lotto–Intermarché)
	Team	(France) Unibet Rose Rockets	

The 2026 Tour of Holland (officially 2026 Eneco Tour for sponsorship reasons) is a men's road cycling stage race which takes place from 13 to 18 October 2026 in the Netherlands. It is the 46th edition of the Tour of the Netherlands, and the 2nd under its current guise as Tour of Holland. The race is rated as a 2.1 event on the 2026 UCI Europe Tour calendar.

For the first time, the race were integrated with the women's Eneco Womens Tour, sharing the same routes on the same dates.

== Teams ==
Seven UCI WorldTeams, three UCI ProTeams and five UCI Continental teams made up the fifteen teams that participated in the race.

UCI WorldTeams

- Alpecin–Premier Tech
- Lidl–Trek
- Lotto–Intermarché
- Red Bull–Bora–Hansgrohe
- Soudal–Quick-Step
- Team Picnic–PostNL
- Visma–Lease a Bike

UCI ProTeams

- Team Flanders–Baloise
- Team TotalEnergies
- Unibet Rose Rockets

UCI Continental Teams

- Azerion / Villa Valkenburg
- BEAT CC p/b Saxo
- EEW–VDK Cyclingteam
- Metec–Solarwatt p/b Mantel
- VolkerWessels Cycling Team

== Schedule ==
Stage characteristics and winners
Stage	Date	Route	Distance	Type	Stage winner
P	13 October	The Hague to The Hague	3.1 km (1.9 mi)	Individual time trial	Jakob Söderqvist (SWE)
1	14 October	Ede to Ede	120 km (75 mi)	Flat stage	Tim Merlier (BEL)
2	15 October	Tilburg to Tilburg	13.6 km (8.5 mi)	Individual time trial	Jakob Söderqvist (SWE)
3	16 October	Sittard to Watersley	110.5 km (68.7 mi)	Hilly stage	Mick van Dijke (NED)
4	17 October	Hoogeveen to Vamberg	149.8 km (93.1 mi)	Hilly stage	Victor Vercouillie (BEL)
5	18 October	Arnhem to Arnhem	149.2 km (92.7 mi)	Flat stage	Tim Merlier (BEL)
Total			546.2 km (339.4 mi)		

== Stages ==
=== Prologue ===
For the first time in the race history, men and women will race at the same time on the route. It was planned that every men and women competitor starting alternately in 5 minute interval, however after the plan was blocked by UCI due to insurance issues, it was changed to 30 men and 30 women competitors starting alternately.

13 October 2026 – The Hague to The Hague, 3.1 km (1.9 mi) (ITT)

Prologue Result
Rank	Rider	Team	Time
1	Jakob Söderqvist (SWE)	Lidl–Trek	3' 32"
2	Wessel Mouris (NED)	Unibet Rose Rockets	+ 1"
3	Christophe Laporte (FRA)	Visma–Lease a Bike	+ 1"
4	Ethan Hayter (GBR)	Soudal–Quick-Step	+ 2"
5	Michiel Mouris (NED)	Red Bull–Bora–Hansgrohe	+ 3"
6	Finn Fisher-Black (NZL)	Red Bull–Bora–Hansgrohe	+ 4"
7	Tomáš Kopecký (CZE)	Unibet Rose Rockets	+ 5"
8	Pepijn Reinderink (NED)	Soudal–Quick-Step	+ 6"
9	Edoardo Affini (ITA)	Visma–Lease a Bike	+ 6"
10	Hartthijs de Vries (NED)	Unibet Rose Rockets	+ 7"

General classification after prologue
Rank	Rider	Team	Time
1	Jakob Söderqvist (SWE)	Lidl–Trek	3' 32"
2	Wessel Mouris (NED)	Unibet Rose Rockets	+ 1"
3	Christophe Laporte (FRA)	Visma–Lease a Bike	+ 1"
4	Ethan Hayter (GBR)	Soudal–Quick-Step	+ 2"
5	Michiel Mouris (NED)	Red Bull–Bora–Hansgrohe	+ 3"
6	Finn Fisher-Black (NZL)	Red Bull–Bora–Hansgrohe	+ 4"
7	Tomáš Kopecký (CZE)	Unibet Rose Rockets	+ 5"
8	Pepijn Reinderink (NED)	Soudal–Quick-Step	+ 6"
9	Edoardo Affini (ITA)	Visma–Lease a Bike	+ 6"
10	Hartthijs de Vries (NED)	Unibet Rose Rockets	+ 7"

=== Stage 1 ===
14 October 2026 – Ede to Ede, 120 km (75 mi)

Stage 1 Result
Rank	Rider	Team	Time
1	Tim Merlier (BEL)	Soudal–Quick-Step	2h 32' 59"
2	Dylan Groenewegen (NED)	Unibet Rose Rockets	+ 0"
3	Gerben Thijssen (BEL)	Alpecin–Premier Tech	+ 0"
4	Christophe Laporte (FRA)	Visma–Lease a Bike	+ 0"
5	David Dekker (NED)	BEAT CC p/b Saxo	+ 0"
6	Pavel Bittner (CZE)	Team Picnic–PostNL	+ 0"
7	Nils Eekhoff (NED)	Team Picnic–PostNL	+ 0"
8	Steffen De Schuyteneer (BEL)	Lotto–Intermarché	+ 0"
9	Florian Dauphin (FRA)	Team TotalEnergies	+ 0"
10	Jakob Söderqvist (SWE)	Lidl–Trek	+ 0"

General classification after Stage 1
Rank	Rider	Team	Time
1	Jakob Söderqvist (SWE)	Lidl–Trek	2h 36' 31"
2	Wessel Mouris (NED)	Unibet Rose Rockets	+ 1"
3	Christophe Laporte (FRA)	Visma–Lease a Bike	+ 1"
4	Ethan Hayter (GBR)	Soudal–Quick-Step	+ 2"
5	Tim Merlier (BEL)	Soudal–Quick-Step	+ 2"
6	Michiel Mouris (NED)	Red Bull–Bora–Hansgrohe	+ 3"
7	Finn Fisher-Black (NZL)	Red Bull–Bora–Hansgrohe	+ 4"
8	Tomáš Kopecký (CZE)	Unibet Rose Rockets	+ 5"
9	Pepijn Reinderink (NED)	Soudal–Quick-Step	+ 6"
10	Edoardo Affini (ITA)	Visma–Lease a Bike	+ 6"

=== Stage 2 ===
15 October 2026 – Tilburg to Tilburg, 13.6 km (8.5 mi) (ITT)

Stage 2 Result
Rank	Rider	Team	Time
1	Jakob Söderqvist (SWE)	Lidl–Trek	15' 04.71"
2	Finn Fisher-Black (NZL)	Red Bull–Bora–Hansgrohe	+ 11.28"
3	Ethan Hayter (GBR)	Soudal–Quick-Step	+ 11.74"
4	Pepijn Reinderink (NED)	Soudal–Quick-Step	+ 16.16"
5	Tomáš Kopecký (CZE)	Unibet Rose Rockets	+ 17.80"
6	Wessel Mouris (NED)	Unibet Rose Rockets	+ 18.32"
7	Victor Campenaerts (BEL)	Visma–Lease a Bike	+ 22.15"
8	Michiel Mouris (NED)	Red Bull–Bora–Hansgrohe	+ 28.11"
9	Christophe Laporte (FRA)	Visma–Lease a Bike	+ 28.15"
10	Kristian Egholm (DEN)	Lidl–Trek	+ 32.27"

General classification after Stage 2
Rank	Rider	Team	Time
1	Jakob Söderqvist (SWE)	Lidl–Trek	2h 51' 35"
2	Ethan Hayter (GBR)	Soudal–Quick-Step	+ 14"
3	Finn Fisher-Black (NZL)	Red Bull–Bora–Hansgrohe	+ 15"
4	Wessel Mouris (NED)	Unibet Rose Rockets	+ 20"
5	Pepijn Reinderink (NED)	Soudal–Quick-Step	+ 22"
6	Tomáš Kopecký (CZE)	Unibet Rose Rockets	+ 23"
7	Victor Campenaerts (BEL)	Visma–Lease a Bike	+ 29"
8	Christophe Laporte (FRA)	Visma–Lease a Bike	+ 29"
9	Michiel Mouris (NED)	Red Bull–Bora–Hansgrohe	+ 31"
10	Kristian Egholm (DEN)	Lidl–Trek	+ 39"

=== Stage 3 ===
16 October 2026 – Sittard to Watersley, 110.5 km (68.7 mi)

Stage 3 Result
Rank	Rider	Team	Time
1	Mick van Dijke (NED)	Red Bull–Bora–Hansgrohe	2h 25' 52"
2	Victor Campenaerts (BEL)	Visma–Lease a Bike	+ 1"
3	Jonas Rutsch (GER)	Lotto–Intermarché	+ 9"
4	Pierre Thierry (FRA)	Team TotalEnergies	+ 10"
5	Wessel Mouris (NED)	Unibet Rose Rockets	+ 13"
6	Jochem Kerckhaert (NED)	BEAT CC p/b Saxo	+ 33"
7	Milan Lanhove (BEL)	Team Flanders–Baloise	+ 33"
8	Tomáš Kopecký (CZE)	Unibet Rose Rockets	+ 33"
9	Finn Fisher-Black (NZL)	Red Bull–Bora–Hansgrohe	+ 33"
10	Steffen De Schuyteneer (BEL)	Lotto–Intermarché	+ 35"

General classification after stage 3
Rank	Rider	Team	Time
1	Victor Campenaerts (BEL)	Visma–Lease a Bike	5h 17' 45"
2	Wessel Mouris (NED)	Unibet Rose Rockets	+ 15"
3	Finn Fisher-Black (NZL)	Red Bull–Bora–Hansgrohe	+ 30"
4	Tomáš Kopecký (CZE)	Unibet Rose Rockets	+ 38"
5	Pierre Thierry (FRA)	Team TotalEnergies	+ 47"
6	Milan Lanhove (BEL)	Team Flanders–Baloise	+ 59"
7	Mick van Dijke (NED)	Red Bull–Bora–Hansgrohe	+ 1' 00"
8	Pepijn Reinderink (NED)	Soudal–Quick-Step	+ 1' 02"
9	Christophe Laporte (FRA)	Visma–Lease a Bike	+ 1' 09"
10	Steffen De Schuyteneer (BEL)	Lotto–Intermarché	+ 1' 15"

=== Stage 4 ===
17 October 2026 – Hoogeveen to Vamberg, 149.8 km (93.1 mi)

Stage 4 Result
Rank	Rider	Team	Time
1	Victor Vercouillie (BEL)	Team Flanders–Baloise	3h 26' 22"
2	Ceriel Desal (BEL)	Soudal–Quick-Step	+ 2"
3	Tars Poelvoorde (BEL)	Lotto–Intermarché	+ 2"
4	Rick Ottema (NED)	EEW–VDK Cyclingteam	+ 2"
5	Julian Vergouw (NED)	Metec–Solarwatt p/b Mantel	+ 2"
6	Christophe Laporte (FRA)	Visma–Lease a Bike	+ 12"
7	Joeri Schaper (NED)	Soudal–Quick-Step	+ 12"
8	Pepijn Reinderink (NED)	Soudal–Quick-Step	+ 12"
9	Victor Campenaerts (BEL)	Visma–Lease a Bike	+ 12"
10	Finn Fisher-Black (NZL)	Red Bull–Bora–Hansgrohe	+ 12"

General classification after stage 4
Rank	Rider	Team	Time
1	Victor Campenaerts (BEL)	Visma–Lease a Bike	8h 44' 19"
2	Wessel Mouris (NED)	Unibet Rose Rockets	+ 15"
3	Finn Fisher-Black (NZL)	Red Bull–Bora–Hansgrohe	+ 30"
4	Tomáš Kopecký (CZE)	Unibet Rose Rockets	+ 38"
5	Pepijn Reinderink (NED)	Soudal–Quick-Step	+ 1' 02"
6	Milan Lanhove (BEL)	Team Flanders–Baloise	+ 1' 06"
7	Christophe Laporte (FRA)	Visma–Lease a Bike	+ 1' 09"
8	Jakob Söderqvist (SWE)	Lidl–Trek	+ 1' 16"
9	Pierre Thierry (FRA)	Team TotalEnergies	+ 1' 19"
10	Steffen De Schuyteneer (BEL)	Lotto–Intermarché	+ 1' 22"

=== Stage 5 ===
18 October 2026 – Arnhem to Arnhem, 149.2 km (92.7 mi)

Stage 5 Result
Rank	Rider	Team	Time
1	Tim Merlier (BEL)	Soudal–Quick-Step	3h 05' 07"
2	Dylan Groenewegen (NED)	Unibet Rose Rockets	+ 0"
3	Davide Donati (ITA)	Red Bull–Bora–Hansgrohe	+ 0"
4	Jakob Söderqvist (SWE)	Lidl–Trek	+ 0"
5	Elmar Reinders (NED)	Unibet Rose Rockets	+ 0"
6	Lukáš Kubiš (CZE)	Unibet Rose Rockets	+ 0"
7	Gerben Thijssen (NED)	Alpecin–Premier Tech	+ 0"
8	Florian Dauphin (FRA)	Team TotalEnergies	+ 0"
9	Steffen De Schuyteneer (BEL)	Lotto–Intermarché	+ 0"
10	Victor Campenaerts (BEL)	Visma–Lease a Bike	+ 0"

Final general classification
Rank	Rider	Team	Time
1	Victor Campenaerts (BEL)	Visma–Lease a Bike	11h 49' 26"
2	Wessel Mouris (NED)	Unibet Rose Rockets	+ 15"
3	Finn Fisher-Black (NZL)	Red Bull–Bora–Hansgrohe	+ 30"
4	Tomáš Kopecký (CZE)	Unibet Rose Rockets	+ 38"
5	Pepijn Reinderink (NED)	Soudal–Quick-Step	+ 1' 02"
6	Milan Lanhove (BEL)	Team Flanders–Baloise	+ 1' 06"
7	Christophe Laporte (FRA)	Visma–Lease a Bike	+ 1' 09"
8	Jakob Söderqvist (SWE)	Lidl–Trek	+ 1' 16"
9	Pierre Thierry (FRA)	Team TotalEnergies	+ 1' 17"
10	Steffen De Schuyteneer (BEL)	Lotto–Intermarché	+ 1' 22"

== Classification leadership table ==
Classification leadership by stage
Stage	Winner	General classification	Points classification	Young rider classification	Most combative rider	Team classification
P	Jakob Söderqvist	Jakob Söderqvist	Jakob Söderqvist (Note: On stage 1, Wessel Mouris, who was second in the points classification, wore the blue jersey, because first-placed Jakob Söderqvist wore the orange jersey as the leader of the general classification. On stage 2 and 3, Christophe Laporte, who was second in the points classification, wore the blue jersey for the same reason.)	Michiel Mouris	Roan Konings	Unibet Rose Rockets
1	Tim Merlier	Jakob Söderqvist	Jakob Söderqvist	Michiel Mouris	Rick Ottema	Unibet Rose Rockets
2	Jakob Söderqvist	Jakob Söderqvist	Jakob Söderqvist	Michiel Mouris	Jakob Söderqvist (Note: On stage 3, Finn Fisher-Black, who was second in the combativity classification, wore the maroon jersey, because first-placed Jakob Söderqvist wore the orange jersey as the leader of the general classification.)	Lidl–Trek
3	Mick van Dijke	Victor Campenaerts	Jakob Söderqvist	Steffen De Schuyteneer	Victor Campenaerts (Note: On stage 4, Mick van Dijke, who was second in the combativity classification, wore the maroon jersey, because first-placed Victor Campenaerts wore the orange jersey as the leader of the general classification.)	Unibet Rose Rockets
4	Victor Vercouillie	Victor Campenaerts	Jakob Söderqvist	Steffen De Schuyteneer	Rick Ottema	Unibet Rose Rockets
5	Tim Merlier	Victor Campenaerts	Jakob Söderqvist	Steffen De Schuyteneer	Rick Ottema	Unibet Rose Rockets
Final		Victor Campenaerts	Jakob Söderqvist	Steffen De Schuyteneer	None	Unibet Rose Rockets

== Classification standings ==
Legend
Denotes the winner of the general classification	
Denotes the winner of the points classification	Denotes the winner of the young rider classification

=== General classification ===
Final general classification (1–10)
Rank	Rider	Team	Time
1	Victor Campenaerts (BEL)	Visma–Lease a Bike	11h 49' 26"
2	Wessel Mouris (NED)	Unibet Rose Rockets	+ 15"
3	Finn Fisher-Black (NZL)	Red Bull–Bora–Hansgrohe	+ 30"
4	Tomáš Kopecký (CZE)	Unibet Rose Rockets	+ 38"
5	Pepijn Reinderink (NED)	Soudal–Quick-Step	+ 1' 02"
6	Milan Lanhove (BEL)	Team Flanders–Baloise	+ 1' 06"
7	Christophe Laporte (FRA)	Visma–Lease a Bike	+ 1' 09"
8	Jakob Söderqvist (SWE)	Lidl–Trek	+ 1' 16"
9	Pierre Thierry (FRA)	Team TotalEnergies	+ 1' 17"
10	Steffen De Schuyteneer (BEL)	Lotto–Intermarché	+ 1' 22"

=== Points classification ===
Final points classification (1–10)
Rank	Rider	Team	Points
1	Jakob Söderqvist (SWE)	Lidl–Trek	71
2	Tim Merlier (BEL)	Soudal–Quick-Step	53
3	Wessel Mouris (NED)	Unibet Rose Rockets	47
4	Christophe Laporte (FRA)	Visma–Lease a Bike	47
5	Victor Campenaerts (BEL)	Visma–Lease a Bike	46
6	Finn Fisher-Black (NZL)	Red Bull–Bora–Hansgrohe	43
7	Dylan Groenewegen (NED)	Unibet Rose Rockets	40
8	Tomáš Kopecký (CZE)	Unibet Rose Rockets	33
9	Pepijn Reinderink (NED)	Soudal–Quick-Step	30
10	Ethan Hayter (GBR)	Soudal–Quick-Step	30

=== Young rider classification ===
Final youngrider classification (1–10)
Rank	Rider	Team	Time
1	Steffen De Schuyteneer (BEL)	Lotto–Intermarché	11h 50' 48"
2	Davide Donati (ITA)	Red Bull–Bora–Hansgrohe	+ 34"
3	Sente Sentjens (BEL)	Alpecin–Premier Tech	+ 1' 16"
4	Danijel Agricola (NED)	Metec–Solarwatt p/b Mantel	+ 1' 18"
5	Bert Bolle (BEL)	VolkerWessels Cycling Team	+ 1' 41"
6	Nolan Huysmans (BEL)	Team Flanders–Baloise	+ 1' 44"
7	Tuur Verbeeck (BEL)	Lotto–Intermarché	+ 1' 45"
8	Michiel Mouris (NED)	Red Bull–Bora–Hansgrohe	+ 2' 12"
9	Otto van Zanden (NED)	Azerion / Villa Valkenburg	+ 2' 20"
10	Joeri Schaper (NED)	Soudal–Quick-Step	+ 5' 50"

=== Team classification ===
Final team classification (1–10)
Rank	Team	Time
1	(France) Unibet Rose Rockets	35h 30' 26"
2	(Germany) Red Bull–Bora–Hansgrohe	+ 2' 24"
3	(Belgium) Team Flanders–Baloise	+ 3' 24"
4	(Belgium) Lotto–Intermarché	+ 3' 29"
5	(Belgium) Alpecin–Premier Tech	+ 4' 23"
6	(Netherlands) BEAT CC p/b Saxo	+ 5' 14"
7	(Netherlands) Visma–Lease a Bike	+ 6' 14"
8	(Belgium) Soudal–Quick-Step	+ 7' 09"
9	(France) Team TotalEnergies	+ 8' 01"
10	(Netherlands) Metec–Solarwatt p/b Mantel	+ 8' 16"
