= 2024 Okolo Slovenska =

2024 UCI Europe Tour

Race details
- Dates: 26 – 30 June 2024
- Stages: 5
- Distance: 710.5 km (441.5 mi)
- Winning time: 16h 36' 03"

Results
Jersey awarded to the overall winner	Winner	Mauro Schmid (SUI)	(Team Jayco–AlUla)
	Second	Julian Alaphilippe (FRA)	(Soudal–Quick-Step)
	Third	Felix Engelhardt (GER)	(Team Jayco–AlUla)
Jersey awarded to the points classification winner	Points	Julian Alaphilippe (FRA)	(Soudal–Quick-Step)
Jersey awarded to the mountains classification winner	Mountains	Kyrylo Tsarenko (UKR)	(Team Corratec–Vini Fantini)
Jersey awarded to the youth classification winner	Youth	Gil Gelders (BEL)	(Soudal–Quick-Step)
	Team	(Australia) Team Jayco–AlUla	

The 2024 Okolo Slovenska (transl. Tour of Slovakia) was the 68th edition of the Okolo Slovenska road cycling stage race. It was held between 26 and 30 June 2024, as a category 2.1 event on the 2024 UCI Europe Tour.

== Teams ==
Three UCI WorldTeams, seven UCI ProTeams, ten UCI Continental teams, and the Mexican national team made up the twenty-one participating teams in the race.

UCI WorldTeams

- Cofidis
- Soudal–Quick-Step
- Team Jayco–AlUla

UCI ProTeams

- Bingoal WB
- Caja Rural–Seguros RGA
- Lotto–Dstny
- Polti–Kometa
- Q36.5 Pro Cycling Team
- Team Corratec–Vini Fantini
- Team Novo Nordisk

UCI Continental Teams

- Adria Mobil
- ARA Skip Capital
- Arkéa–B&B Hôtels Continentale
- ATT Investments
- Biesse–Carrera
- Dukla Banská Bystrica
- Elkov–Kasper
- Hrinkow Advarics
- Pierre Baguette Cycling
- VolkerWessels Women's Pro Cycling Team

National Teams

- Mexico

== Route ==
Stage characteristics and winners
Stage	Date	Route	Distance	Type	Winner
1	26 June	Dunajská Streda to Dunajská Streda	28.8 km (17.9 mi)	Team time trial	(Australia) Team Jayco–AlUla
2	27 June	Nitra to Hlohovec	192 km (119 mi)	Hilly stage	Anders Foldager (DEN)
3	28 June	Piešťany to Dubnica nad Váhom	161.2 km (100.2 mi)	Hilly stage	Julian Alaphilippe (FRA)
4	29 June	Partizánske to Ružomberok	183.5 km (114.0 mi)	Mountain stage	Johannes Adamietz (GER)
5	30 June	Liptovský Mikuláš to Štrbské Pleso	145 km (90 mi)	Mountain stage	Felix Engelhardt (GER)
Total			710.5 km (441.5 mi)		

== Stages ==
=== Stage 1 ===
26 June 2024 — Dunajská Streda to Dunajská Streda, 28.8 km (17.9 mi) (TTT)

Stage 1 Result
Rank	Team	Time
1	(Australia) Team Jayco–AlUla	31' 43"
2	(Belgium) Soudal–Quick-Step	+ 25"
3	(Switzerland) Q36.5 Pro Cycling Team	+ 36"
4	(Belgium) Lotto–Dstny	+ 50"
5	(France) Cofidis	+ 1' 23"
6	(France) Arkéa–B&B Hôtels Continentale	+ 1' 25"
7	(Italy) Polti–Kometa	+ 1' 45"
8	(Czech Republic) Elkov–Kasper	+ 1' 53"
9	(Spain) Caja Rural–Seguros RGA	+ 1' 53"
10	(Czech Republic) ATT Investments	+ 2' 00"

General classification after Stage 1
Rank	Rider	Team	Time
1	Max Walscheid (GER)	Team Jayco–AlUla	31' 43"
2	Mauro Schmid (SUI)	Team Jayco–AlUla	+ 0"
3	Anders Foldager (DEN)	Team Jayco–AlUla	+ 0"
4	Felix Engelhardt (GER)	Team Jayco–AlUla	+ 0"
5	Callum Scotson (AUS)	Team Jayco–AlUla	+ 0"
6	Gil Gelders (BEL)	Soudal–Quick-Step	+ 25"
7	Julian Alaphilippe (FRA)	Soudal–Quick-Step	+ 25"
8	Pepijn Reinderink (NED)	Soudal–Quick-Step	+ 25"
9	Warre Vangheluwe (BEL)	Soudal–Quick-Step	+ 25"
10	Giacomo Nizzolo (ITA)	Q36.5 Pro Cycling Team	+ 36"

=== Stage 2 ===
27 June 2024 — Nitra to Hlohovec, 192 km (119 mi)

Stage 2 Result
Rank	Rider	Team	Time
1	Anders Foldager (DEN)	Team Jayco–AlUla	4h 32' 47"
2	Jenno Berckmoes (BEL)	Lotto–Dstny	+ 1"
3	Lukáš Kubiš (SVK)	Elkov–Kasper	+ 1"
4	Julian Alaphilippe (FRA)	Soudal–Quick-Step	+ 1"
5	Finn Crockett (IRL)	VolkerWessels Women's Pro Cycling Team	+ 4"
6	Fernando Barceló (ESP)	Caja Rural–Seguros RGA	+ 4"
7	Gil Gelders (BEL)	Soudal–Quick-Step	+ 6"
8	Šimon Vaníček (CZE)	ATT Investments	+ 6"
9	Stefano Oldani (ITA)	Cofidis	+ 6"
10	Paul Double (GBR)	Polti–Kometa	+ 6"

General classification after Stage 2
Rank	Rider	Team	Time
1	Anders Foldager (DEN)	Team Jayco–AlUla	5h 04' 20"
2	Mauro Schmid (SUI)	Team Jayco–AlUla	+ 16"
3	Felix Engelhardt (GER)	Team Jayco–AlUla	+ 16"
4	Callum Scotson (AUS)	Team Jayco–AlUla	+ 36"
5	Julian Alaphilippe (FRA)	Soudal–Quick-Step	+ 36"
6	Max Walscheid (GER)	Team Jayco–AlUla	+ 38"
7	Gil Gelders (BEL)	Soudal–Quick-Step	+ 41"
8	Pepijn Reinderink (NED)	Soudal–Quick-Step	+ 41"
9	Walter Calzoni (ITA)	Q36.5 Pro Cycling Team	+ 52"
10	Mark Donovan (GBR)	Q36.5 Pro Cycling Team	+ 52"

=== Stage 3 ===
28 June 2024 — Piešťany to Dubnica nad Váhom, 161.2 km (100.2 mi)

Stage 3 Result
Rank	Rider	Team	Time
1	Julian Alaphilippe (FRA)	Soudal–Quick-Step	3h 38' 47"
2	Paul Magnier (FRA)	Soudal–Quick-Step	+ 2"
3	Hamish Beadle (NZL)	Team Novo Nordisk	+ 2"
4	Jenno Berckmoes (BEL)	Lotto–Dstny	+ 7"
5	Lukáš Kubiš (SVK)	Elkov–Kasper	+ 7"
6	Stefano Oldani (ITA)	Cofidis	+ 8"
7	Timo de Jong (NED)	VolkerWessels Women's Pro Cycling Team	+ 8"
8	Alexander Salby (DEN)	Bingoal WB	+ 8"
9	Andrea D'Amato (ITA)	Biesse–Carrera	+ 8"
10	Fernando Barceló (ESP)	Caja Rural–Seguros RGA	+ 11"

General classification after Stage 3
Rank	Rider	Team	Time
1	Anders Foldager (DEN)	Team Jayco–AlUla	8h 43' 23"
2	Julian Alaphilippe (FRA)	Soudal–Quick-Step	+ 10"
3	Mauro Schmid (SUI)	Team Jayco–AlUla	+ 13"
4	Felix Engelhardt (GER)	Team Jayco–AlUla	+ 13"
5	Max Walscheid (GER)	Team Jayco–AlUla	+ 38"
6	Gil Gelders (BEL)	Soudal–Quick-Step	+ 41"
7	Pepijn Reinderink (NED)	Soudal–Quick-Step	+ 41"
8	Callum Scotson (AUS)	Team Jayco–AlUla	+ 42"
9	Jenno Berckmoes (BEL)	Lotto–Dstny	+ 46"
10	Mark Donovan (GBR)	Q36.5 Pro Cycling Team	+ 58"

=== Stage 4 ===
29 June 2024 — Partizánske to Ružomberok, 183.5 km (114.0 mi)

Stage 4 Result
Rank	Rider	Team	Time
1	Johannes Adamietz (GER)	Lotto–Dstny	4h 28' 02"
2	Kyrylo Tsarenko (UKR)	Team Corratec–Vini Fantini	+ 0"
3	Pierre Thierry (FRA)	Arkéa–B&B Hôtels Continentale	+ 0"
4	Andrea Garosio (ITA)	Polti–Kometa	+ 4"
5	Jenno Berckmoes (BEL)	Lotto–Dstny	+ 17"
6	Mauro Schmid (SUI)	Team Jayco–AlUla	+ 17"
7	Julian Alaphilippe (FRA)	Soudal–Quick-Step	+ 22"
8	Anders Foldager (DEN)	Team Jayco–AlUla	+ 52"
9	Fernando Barceló (ESP)	Caja Rural–Seguros RGA	+ 52"
10	Lukáš Kubiš (SVK)	Elkov–Kasper	+ 52"

General classification after Stage 4
Rank	Rider	Team	Time
1	Mauro Schmid (SUI)	Team Jayco–AlUla	13h 11' 55"
2	Julian Alaphilippe (FRA)	Soudal–Quick-Step	+ 2"
3	Anders Foldager (DEN)	Team Jayco–AlUla	+ 22"
4	Jenno Berckmoes (BEL)	Lotto–Dstny	+ 33"
5	Felix Engelhardt (GER)	Team Jayco–AlUla	+ 35"
6	Gil Gelders (BEL)	Soudal–Quick-Step	+ 1' 03"
7	Callum Scotson (AUS)	Team Jayco–AlUla	+ 1' 10"
8	Sylvain Moniquet (BEL)	Lotto–Dstny	+ 1' 25"
9	Andrea Garosio (ITA)	Polti–Kometa	+ 1' 35"
10	Pepijn Reinderink (NED)	Soudal–Quick-Step	+ 1' 35"

=== Stage 5 ===
30 June 2024 — Liptovský Mikuláš to Štrbské Pleso, 145 km (90 mi)

Stage 5 Result
Rank	Rider	Team	Time
1	Felix Engelhardt (GER)	Team Jayco–AlUla	3h 24' 11"
2	Mauro Schmid (SUI)	Team Jayco–AlUla	+ 6"
3	Julian Alaphilippe (FRA)	Soudal–Quick-Step	+ 6"
4	Sylvain Moniquet (BEL)	Lotto–Dstny	+ 8"
5	Paul Double (GBR)	Polti–Kometa	+ 11"
6	Embret Svestad-Bårdseng (NOR)	Arkéa–B&B Hôtels Continentale	+ 18"
7	Jenno Berckmoes (BEL)	Lotto–Dstny	+ 20"
8	Abel Balderstone (ESP)	Caja Rural–Seguros RGA	+ 21"
9	Fernando Barceló (ESP)	Caja Rural–Seguros RGA	+ 21"
10	Stefano Oldani (ITA)	Cofidis	+ 29"

General classification after Stage 5
Rank	Rider	Team	Time
1	Mauro Schmid (SUI)	Team Jayco–AlUla	16h 36' 03"
2	Julian Alaphilippe (FRA)	Soudal–Quick-Step	+ 7"
3	Felix Engelhardt (GER)	Team Jayco–AlUla	+ 28"
4	Anders Foldager (DEN)	Team Jayco–AlUla	+ 53"
5	Jenno Berckmoes (BEL)	Lotto–Dstny	+ 54"
6	Sylvain Moniquet (BEL)	Lotto–Dstny	+ 1' 36"
7	Gil Gelders (BEL)	Soudal–Quick-Step	+ 1' 40"
8	Callum Scotson (AUS)	Team Jayco–AlUla	+ 1' 55"
9	Alessandro Fancellu (ITA)	Q36.5 Pro Cycling Team	+ 2' 08"
10	Andrea Garosio (ITA)	Polti–Kometa	+ 2' 16"

== Classification leadership table ==
Classification leadership by stage
Stage	Winner	General classification	Points classification	Mountains classification	Young rider classification	Team classification
1	Team Jayco–AlUla	Max Walscheid	not awarded	not awarded	Gil Gelders	Team Jayco–AlUla
2	Anders Foldager	Anders Foldager	Anders Foldager	Matúš Štoček	Gil Gelders	Team Jayco–AlUla
3	Julian Alaphilippe	Anders Foldager	Julian Alaphilippe	Matúš Štoček	Gil Gelders	Team Jayco–AlUla
4	Johannes Adamietz	Mauro Schmid	Julian Alaphilippe	Kyrylo Tsarenko	Gil Gelders	Lotto–Dstny
5	Felix Engelhardt	Mauro Schmid	Julian Alaphilippe	Kyrylo Tsarenko	Gil Gelders	Team Jayco–AlUla
Final		Mauro Schmid	Julian Alaphilippe	Kyrylo Tsarenko	Gil Gelders	Team Jayco–AlUla

== Classification standings ==
Legend
Denotes the winner of the general classification	Denotes the winner of the mountains classification
Denotes the winner of the points classification	Denotes the winner of the young rider classification

=== General classification ===
Final general classification (1–10)
Rank	Rider	Team	Time
1	Mauro Schmid (SUI)	Team Jayco–AlUla	16h 36' 03"
2	Julian Alaphilippe (FRA)	Soudal–Quick-Step	+ 7"
3	Felix Engelhardt (GER)	Team Jayco–AlUla	+ 28"
4	Anders Foldager (DEN)	Team Jayco–AlUla	+ 53"
5	Jenno Berckmoes (BEL)	Lotto–Dstny	+ 54"
6	Sylvain Moniquet (BEL)	Lotto–Dstny	+ 1' 36"
7	Gil Gelders (BEL)	Soudal–Quick-Step	+ 1' 40"
8	Callum Scotson (AUS)	Team Jayco–AlUla	+ 1' 55"
9	Alessandro Fancellu (ITA)	Q36.5 Pro Cycling Team	+ 2' 08"
10	Andrea Garosio (ITA)	Polti–Kometa	+ 2' 16"

=== Points classification ===
Final points classification (1–10)
Rank	Rider	Team	Points
1	Julian Alaphilippe (FRA)	Soudal–Quick-Step	42
2	Jenno Berckmoes (BEL)	Lotto–Dstny	39
3	Anders Foldager (DEN)	Team Jayco–AlUla	26
4	Lukáš Kubiš (SVK)	Elkov–Kasper	21
5	Johannes Adamietz (GER)	Lotto–Dstny	20
6	Mauro Schmid (SUI)	Team Jayco–AlUla	20
7	Andrea Garosio (ITA)	Polti–Kometa	19
8	Kyrylo Tsarenko (UKR)	Team Corratec–Vini Fantini	18
9	Hamish Beadle (NZL)	Team Novo Nordisk	12
10	Fernando Barceló (ESP)	Caja Rural–Seguros RGA	11

=== Mountains classification ===
Final mountains classification (1–10)
Rank	Rider	Team	Points
1	Kyrylo Tsarenko (UKR)	Team Corratec–Vini Fantini	54
2	Matúš Štoček (SVK)	ATT Investments	35
3	Johannes Adamietz (GER)	Lotto–Dstny	34
4	Pierre Thierry (FRA)	Arkéa–B&B Hôtels Continentale	19
5	Andrea Garosio (ITA)	Polti–Kometa	18
6	Martin Svrček (SVK)	Soudal–Quick-Step	15
7	Jente Klaver (NED)	VolkerWessels Women's Pro Cycling Team	15
8	Julian Alaphilippe (FRA)	Soudal–Quick-Step	14
9	Callum Scotson (AUS)	Team Jayco–AlUla	10
10	Xabier Azparren (ESP)	Q36.5 Pro Cycling Team	8

=== Young rider classification ===
Final young rider classification (1–10)
Rank	Rider	Team	Time
1	Gil Gelders (BEL)	Soudal–Quick-Step	16h 37' 43"
2	Embret Svestad-Bårdseng (NOR)	Arkéa–B&B Hôtels Continentale	+ 48"
3	Pepijn Reinderink (NED)	Soudal–Quick-Step	+ 2' 25"
4	Baptiste Gillet (FRA)	Arkéa–B&B Hôtels Continentale	+ 2' 52"
5	Michiel Lambrecht (BEL)	Bingoal WB	+ 3' 25"
6	Filip Gruszczynski (POL)	Biesse–Carrera	+ 3' 43"
7	Pierre Thierry (FRA)	Arkéa–B&B Hôtels Continentale	+ 4' 31"
8	Martin Svrček (SVK)	Soudal–Quick-Step	+ 7' 28"
9	Matthias Schwarzbacher (SVK)	ATT Investments	+ 8' 27"
10	Daniel Vysočan (CZE)	Pierre Baguette Cycling	+ 9' 38"

=== Team classification ===
Final team classification (1–10)
Rank	Team	Time
1	(Australia) Team Jayco–AlUla	48h 46' 34"
2	(Belgium) Lotto–Dstny	+ 2' 21"
3	(Italy) Polti–Kometa	+ 2' 31"
4	(Belgium) Soudal–Quick-Step	+ 3' 11"
5	(France) Cofidis	+ 3' 58"
6	(Spain) Caja Rural–Seguros RGA	+ 4' 35"
7	(Switzerland) Q36.5 Pro Cycling Team	+ 5' 36"
8	(France) Arkéa–B&B Hôtels Continentale	+ 6' 06"
9	(Italy) Biesse–Carrera	+ 17' 14"
10	(Czech Republic) Elkov–Kasper	+ 20' 38"
