= 2024 Deutschland Tour =

2024 UCI ProSeries

Race details
- Dates: 21–25 August 2024
- Stages: 5
- Distance: 747.6 km (464.5 mi)
- Winning time: 18h 26' 39"

Results
Jersey awarded to the overall winner	Winner	Mads Pedersen (DEN)	(Lidl–Trek)
	Second	Danny van Poppel (NED)	(Red Bull–Bora–Hansgrohe)
	Third	Tobias Halland Johannessen (NOR)	(Uno-X Mobility)
Jersey awarded to the points classification winner	Points	Jonathan Milan (ITA)	(Lidl–Trek)
Jersey awarded to the mountains classification winner	Mountains	Jørgen Nordhagen (NOR)	(Visma–Lease a Bike)
Jersey awarded to the youth classification winner	Youth	Tobias Halland Johannessen (NOR)	(Uno-X Mobility)
Jersey awarded to the team classification winner	Team	(Spain) Caja Rural–Seguros RGA	

The 2024 Deutschland Tour was a men's road cycling stage race which took place from 21 to 25 August 2024. It was the 38th edition of the Deutschland Tour, which is rated as a 2.Pro event on the 2024 UCI ProSeries calendar.

== Teams ==
12 of the 18 UCI WorldTeams, five UCI ProTeams, two UCI Continental teams and the German national team made up the twenty teams in the race.

UCI WorldTeams

- Alpecin–Deceuninck
- Astana Qazaqstan Team
- EF Education–EasyPost
- Ineos Grenadiers
- Intermarché–Wanty
- Lidl–Trek
- Movistar Team
- Red Bull–Bora–Hansgrohe
- Soudal–Quick-Step
- Team Bahrain Victorious
- Team dsm–firmenich PostNL
- Visma–Lease a Bike

UCI ProTeams

- Caja Rural–Seguros RGA
- Q36.5 Pro Cycling Team
- Team TotalEnergies
- Tudor Pro Cycling Team
- Uno-X Mobility

UCI Continental Teams

- Bike Aid
- Team Lotto–Kern Haus PSD Bank

National Teams

- Germany

== Schedule ==
Stage characteristics and winners
Stage	Date	Route	Distance	Type	Stage winner
P	21 August	Schweinfurt	2.9 km (1.8 mi)	Individual time trial	Jonathan Milan (ITA)
1	22 August	Schweinfurt to Heilbronn	176.3 km (109.5 mi)	Hilly stage	Jonathan Milan (ITA)
2	23 August	Heilbronn to Schwäbisch Gmünd	174.6 km (108.5 mi)	Hilly stage	Mads Pedersen (DEN)
3	24 August	Schwäbisch Gmünd to Villingen-Schwenningen	211.1 km (131.2 mi)	Hilly stage	Jonathan Milan (ITA)
4	25 August	Annweiler am Trifels to Saarbrücken	182.7 km (113.5 mi)	Hilly stage	Mads Pedersen (DEN)
Total			747.6 km (464.5 mi)		

== Stages ==
=== Prologue ===
21 August 2024 – Schweinfurt, 2.9 km (1.8 mi)

Prologue Result
Rank	Rider	Team	Time
1	Jonathan Milan (ITA)	Lidl–Trek	3' 16"
2	Mads Pedersen (DEN)	Lidl–Trek	+ 1"
3	Maikel Zijlaard (NED)	Tudor Pro Cycling Team	+ 2"
4	Ethan Hayter (GBR)	Ineos Grenadiers	+ 3"
5	Stefan Bissegger (SUI)	EF Education–EasyPost	+ 3"
6	Danny van Poppel (NED)	Red Bull–Bora–Hansgrohe	+ 4"
7	Jannik Steimle (GER)	Q36.5 Pro Cycling Team	+ 5"
8	Marco Haller (AUT)	Red Bull–Bora–Hansgrohe	+ 5"
9	Jordi Meeus (BEL)	Red Bull–Bora–Hansgrohe	+ 5"
10	Fabio Christen (SUI)	Q36.5 Pro Cycling Team	+ 6"

General classification after Prologue
Rank	Rider	Team	Time
1	Jonathan Milan (ITA)	Lidl–Trek	3' 16"
2	Mads Pedersen (DEN)	Lidl–Trek	+ 1"
3	Maikel Zijlaard (NED)	Tudor Pro Cycling Team	+ 2"
4	Ethan Hayter (GBR)	Ineos Grenadiers	+ 3"
5	Stefan Bissegger (SUI)	EF Education–EasyPost	+ 3"
6	Danny van Poppel (NED)	Red Bull–Bora–Hansgrohe	+ 4"
7	Jannik Steimle (GER)	Q36.5 Pro Cycling Team	+ 5"
8	Marco Haller (AUT)	Red Bull–Bora–Hansgrohe	+ 5"
9	Jordi Meeus (BEL)	Red Bull–Bora–Hansgrohe	+ 5"
10	Fabio Christen (SUI)	Q36.5 Pro Cycling Team	+ 6"

=== Stage 1 ===
22 August 2024 – Schweinfurt to Heilbronn, 176.3 km (109.5 mi)

Stage 1 Result
Rank	Rider	Team	Time
1	Jonathan Milan (ITA)	Lidl–Trek	4h 16' 17"
2	Jordi Meeus (BEL)	Red Bull–Bora–Hansgrohe	+ 0"
3	Max Kanter (GER)	Astana Qazaqstan Team	+ 0"
4	Alexander Kristoff (NOR)	Uno-X Mobility	+ 0"
5	Henri Uhlig (GER)	Alpecin–Deceuninck	+ 0"
6	Emilien Jeannière (FRA)	Team TotalEnergies	+ 0"
7	Niklas Märkl (GER)	Team dsm–firmenich PostNL	+ 0"
8	Matevž Govekar (SLO)	Team Bahrain Victorious	+ 0"
9	Tobias Müller (GER)	Germany	+ 0"
10	Joshua Huppertz (GER)	Team Lotto–Kern Haus PSD Bank	+ 0"

General classification after Stage 1
Rank	Rider	Team	Time
1	Jonathan Milan (ITA)	Lidl–Trek	4h 19' 23"
2	Jordi Meeus (BEL)	Red Bull–Bora–Hansgrohe	+ 9"
3	Mads Pedersen (DEN)	Lidl–Trek	+ 11"
4	Ethan Hayter (GBR)	Ineos Grenadiers	+ 13"
5	Stefan Bissegger (SUI)	EF Education–EasyPost	+ 13"
6	Danny van Poppel (NED)	Red Bull–Bora–Hansgrohe	+ 14"
7	Jannik Steimle (GER)	Q36.5 Pro Cycling Team	+ 15"
8	Marco Haller (AUT)	Red Bull–Bora–Hansgrohe	+ 15"
9	Fabio Christen (SUI)	Q36.5 Pro Cycling Team	+ 16"
10	Gil Gelders (BEL)	Soudal–Quick-Step	+ 16"

=== Stage 2 ===
23 August 2024 – Heilbronn to Schwäbisch Gmünd, 174.6 km (108.5 mi)

Stage 2 Result
Rank	Rider	Team	Time
1	Mads Pedersen (DEN)	Lidl–Trek	4h 25' 50"
2	Tobias Halland Johannessen (NOR)	Uno-X Mobility	+ 0"
3	Archie Ryan (IRL)	EF Education–EasyPost	+ 0"
4	Danny van Poppel (NED)	Red Bull–Bora–Hansgrohe	+ 6"
5	Emilien Jeannière (FRA)	Team TotalEnergies	+ 6"
6	Orluis Aular (VEN)	Caja Rural–Seguros RGA	+ 6"
7	Jonas Rutsch (GER)	EF Education–EasyPost	+ 6"
8	Ethan Hayter (GBR)	Ineos Grenadiers	+ 6"
9	Tobias Müller (GER)	Germany	+ 0"
10	Sean Flynn (GBR)	Team dsm–firmenich PostNL	+ 6"

General classification after Stage 2
Rank	Rider	Team	Time
1	Mads Pedersen (DEN)	Lidl–Trek	8h 45' 11"
2	Tobias Halland Johannessen (NOR)	Uno-X Mobility	+ 12"
3	Ethan Hayter (GBR)	Ineos Grenadiers	+ 21"
4	Archie Ryan (IRL)	EF Education–EasyPost	+ 21"
5	Stefan Bissegger (SUI)	EF Education–EasyPost	+ 21"
6	Danny van Poppel (NED)	Red Bull–Bora–Hansgrohe	+ 22"
7	Fabio Christen (SUI)	Q36.5 Pro Cycling Team	+ 24"
8	Gil Gelders (BEL)	Soudal–Quick-Step	+ 24"
9	Luke Lamperti (USA)	Soudal–Quick-Step	+ 24"
10	Orluis Aular (VEN)	Caja Rural–Seguros RGA	+ 26"

=== Stage 3 ===
24 August 2024 – Schwäbisch Gmünd to Villingen-Schwenningen, 211.1 km (131.2 mi)

Stage 3 Result
Rank	Rider	Team	Time
1	Jonathan Milan (ITA)	Lidl–Trek	5h 17' 57"
2	Max Kanter (GER)	Astana Qazaqstan Team	+ 0"
3	Jordi Meeus (BEL)	Red Bull–Bora–Hansgrohe	+ 0"
4	Matevž Govekar (SLO)	Team Bahrain Victorious	+ 0"
5	Luke Lamperti (USA)	Soudal–Quick-Step	+ 0"
6	Niklas Märkl (GER)	Team dsm–firmenich PostNL	+ 0"
7	Tibor Del Grosso (NED)	Alpecin–Deceuninck	+ 0"
8	Orluis Aular (VEN)	Caja Rural–Seguros RGA	+ 0"
9	Nicolò Buratti (ITA)	Team Bahrain Victorious	+ 0"
10	Vlad Van Mechelen (BEL)	Team Bahrain Victorious	+ 0"

General classification after Stage 3
Rank	Rider	Team	Time
1	Mads Pedersen (DEN)	Lidl–Trek	14h 03' 08"
2	Tobias Halland Johannessen (NOR)	Uno-X Mobility	+ 12"
3	Danny van Poppel (NED)	Red Bull–Bora–Hansgrohe	+ 19"
4	Ethan Hayter (GBR)	Ineos Grenadiers	+ 21"
5	Archie Ryan (IRL)	EF Education–EasyPost	+ 21"
6	Stefan Bissegger (SUI)	EF Education–EasyPost	+ 21"
7	Luke Lamperti (USA)	Soudal–Quick-Step	+ 22"
8	Fabio Christen (SUI)	Q36.5 Pro Cycling Team	+ 24"
9	Gil Gelders (BEL)	Soudal–Quick-Step	+ 24"
10	Sean Flynn (GBR)	Team dsm–firmenich PostNL	+ 26"

=== Stage 4 ===
25 August 2024 – Annweiler am Trifels to Saarbrücken, 182.7 km (113.5 mi)

Stage 4 Result
Rank	Rider	Team	Time
1	Mads Pedersen (DEN)	Lidl–Trek	4h 23' 42"
2	Danny van Poppel (NED)	Red Bull–Bora–Hansgrohe	+ 0"
3	Luke Lamperti (USA)	Soudal–Quick-Step	+ 0"
4	Santiago Buitrago (COL)	Team Bahrain Victorious	+ 0"
5	Florian Stork (GER)	Tudor Pro Cycling Team	+ 0"
6	Tobias Halland Johannessen (NOR)	Uno-X Mobility	+ 0"
7	Kevin Vermaerke (USA)	Team dsm–firmenich PostNL	+ 0"
8	Jørgen Nordhagen (NOR)	Visma–Lease a Bike	+ 0"
9	Jefferson Alveiro Cepeda (ECU)	Caja Rural–Seguros RGA	+ 0"
10	Henri Uhlig (GER)	Alpecin–Deceuninck	+ 6"

General classification after Stage 4
Rank	Rider	Team	Time
1	Mads Pedersen (DEN)	Lidl–Trek	18h 26' 39"
2	Danny van Poppel (NED)	Red Bull–Bora–Hansgrohe	+ 22"
3	Tobias Halland Johannessen (NOR)	Uno-X Mobility	+ 23"
4	Luke Lamperti (USA)	Soudal–Quick-Step	+ 26"
5	Archie Ryan (IRL)	EF Education–EasyPost	+ 38"
6	Florian Stork (GER)	Tudor Pro Cycling Team	+ 39"
7	Jørgen Nordhagen (NOR)	Visma–Lease a Bike	+ 40"
8	Fabio Christen (SUI)	Q36.5 Pro Cycling Team	+ 41"
9	Gil Gelders (BEL)	Soudal–Quick-Step	+ 41"
10	Kevin Vermaerke (USA)	Team dsm–firmenich PostNL	+ 42"

== Classification leadership table ==
Classification leadership by stage
Stage	Winner	General classification	Points classification	Mountains classification	Young rider classification	Team classification
P	Jonathan Milan	Jonathan Milan	Jonathan Milan	not awarded	Jonathan Milan	Lidl–Trek
1	Jonathan Milan	Jonathan Milan	Jonathan Milan	Santiago Buitrago	Jonathan Milan	Lidl–Trek
2	Mads Pedersen	Mads Pedersen	Jonathan Milan	Dawit Yemane	Tobias Halland Johannessen	Red Bull–Bora–Hansgrohe
3	Jonathan Milan	Mads Pedersen	Jonathan Milan	Jørgen Nordhagen	Tobias Halland Johannessen	Red Bull–Bora–Hansgrohe
4	Mads Pedersen	Mads Pedersen	Jonathan Milan	Jørgen Nordhagen	Tobias Halland Johannessen	Caja Rural–Seguros RGA
Final		Mads Pedersen	Jonathan Milan	Jørgen Nordhagen	Tobias Halland Johannessen	Caja Rural–Seguros RGA

== Classification standings ==
Legend
Denotes the winner of the general classification	Denotes the winner of the mountains classification
Denotes the winner of the points classification	Denotes the winner of the young rider classification

=== General classification ===
Final general classification (1–10)
Rank	Rider	Team	Time
1	Mads Pedersen (DEN)	Lidl–Trek	18h 26' 39"
2	Danny van Poppel (NED)	Red Bull–Bora–Hansgrohe	+ 22"
3	Tobias Halland Johannessen (NOR)	Uno-X Mobility	+ 23"
4	Luke Lamperti (USA)	Soudal–Quick-Step	+ 26"
5	Archie Ryan (IRL)	EF Education–EasyPost	+ 38"
6	Florian Stork (GER)	Tudor Pro Cycling Team	+ 39"
7	Jørgen Nordhagen (NOR)	Visma–Lease a Bike	+ 40"
8	Fabio Christen (SUI)	Q36.5 Pro Cycling Team	+ 41"
9	Gil Gelders (BEL)	Soudal–Quick-Step	+ 41"
10	Kevin Vermaerke (USA)	Team dsm–firmenich PostNL	+ 42"

=== Points classification ===
Final points classification (1–10)
Rank	Rider	Team	Points
1	Jonathan Milan (ITA)	Lidl–Trek	45
2	Mads Pedersen (DEN)	Lidl–Trek	45
3	Danny van Poppel (NED)	Red Bull–Bora–Hansgrohe	24
4	Jordi Meeus (BEL)	Red Bull–Bora–Hansgrohe	23
5	Max Kanter (GER)	Astana Qazaqstan Team	21
6	Tobias Halland Johannessen (NOR)	Uno-X Mobility	17
7	Luke Lamperti (USA)	Soudal–Quick-Step	15
8	Santiago Buitrago (COL)	Team Bahrain Victorious	12
9	Emilien Jeannière (FRA)	Team TotalEnergies	11
10	Ethan Hayter (GBR)	Ineos Grenadiers	10

=== Mountains classification ===
Final mountains classification (1–10)
Rank	Rider	Team	Points
1	Jørgen Nordhagen (NOR)	Visma–Lease a Bike	15
2	Dawit Yemane (ERI)	Bike Aid	10
3	Joshua Huppertz (GER)	Team Lotto–Kern Haus PSD Bank	6
4	Javier Romo (ESP)	Movistar Team	4
5	Miguel Heidemann (GER)	Germany	4
6	Dario Igor Belletta (ITA)	Visma–Lease a Bike	4
7	Oliver Mattheis (GER)	Bike Aid	4
8	Max Walscheid (GER)	Germany	4
9	Santiago Buitrago (COL)	Team Bahrain Victorious	3
10	Anton Theo Lennemann (GER)	Bike Aid	3

=== Young rider classification ===
Final young rider classification (1–10)
Rank	Rider	Team	Time
1	Tobias Halland Johannessen (NOR)	Uno-X Mobility	18h 27' 02"
2	Luke Lamperti (USA)	Soudal–Quick-Step	+ 3"
3	Archie Ryan (IRL)	EF Education–EasyPost	+ 15"
4	Jørgen Nordhagen (NOR)	Visma–Lease a Bike	+ 17"
5	Fabio Christen (SUI)	Q36.5 Pro Cycling Team	+ 18"
6	Gil Gelders (BEL)	Soudal–Quick-Step	+ 18"
7	Kevin Vermaerke (USA)	Team dsm–firmenich PostNL	+ 19"
8	Sean Flynn (GBR)	Team dsm–firmenich PostNL	+ 20"
9	Henri Uhlig (GER)	Alpecin–Deceuninck	+ 23"
10	Marco Brenner (GER)	Tudor Pro Cycling Team	+ 24"

=== Team classification ===
Final team classification (1–10)
Rank	Team	Time
1	(Spain) Caja Rural–Seguros RGA	55h 22' 12"
2	(Netherlands) Team dsm–firmenich PostNL	+ 1"
3	(Netherlands) Visma–Lease a Bike	+ 2"
4	(Spain) Movistar Team	+ 3"
5	(Belgium) Alpecin–Deceuninck	+ 6"
6	(Belgium) Soudal–Quick-Step	+ 11"
7	Team Bahrain Victorious	+ 13"
8	(Belgium) Intermarché–Wanty	+ 1' 46"
9	Germany	+ 2' 14"
10	(Germany) Red Bull–Bora–Hansgrohe	+ 2' 28"
