= Florian Stork =

German cyclist

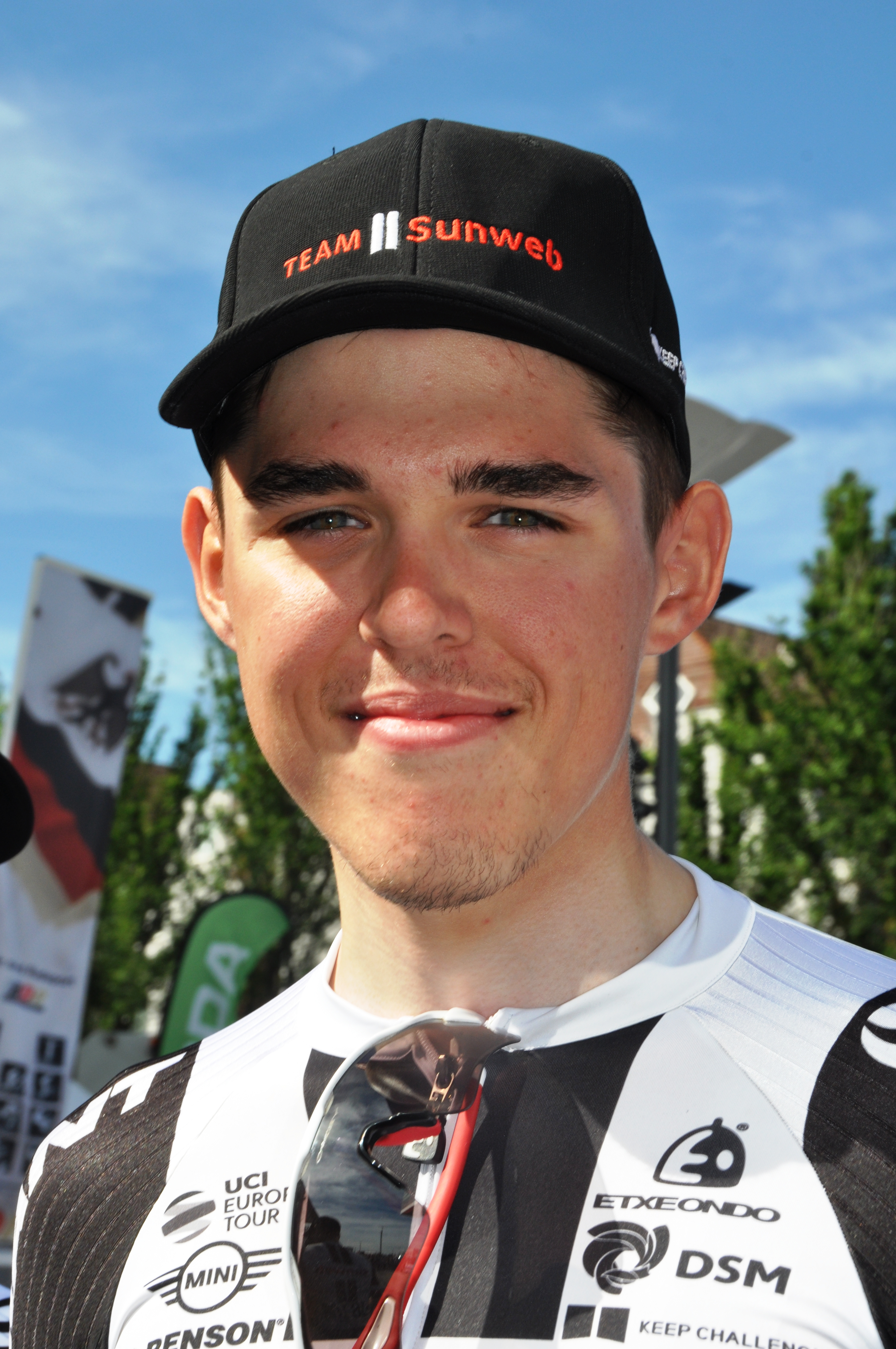
- Stork in 2017

Personal information
- Full name: Florian Stork
- Born: 27 April 1997 (age 29) Bünde, Germany
- Height: 1.85 m (6 ft 1 in)
- Weight: 65 kg (143 lb)

Cycling career
- Sport: Cycling
- Current team: Tudor Pro Cycling Team
- Discipline: Road
- Role: Rider

Amateur teams
- 2008–2015: RC Olympia Bünde
- 2014–2015: ROSE Team NRW

Professional teams
- 2016: Team Sauerland NRW p/b Henley & Partners
- 2017–2019: Development Team Sunweb
- 2019–2023: Team Sunweb
- 2024–: Tudor Pro Cycling Team

Florian Stork (born 27 April 1997) is a German cyclist, who currently rides for UCI ProTeam Tudor Pro Cycling Team.

Stork was promoted from Development Team Sunweb to Team Sunweb in early-2019, after showing promising results early in the season.

== Major results ==
2016
5th Time trial, National Under-23 Road Championships
2018
5th Time trial, National Under-23 Road Championships
5th Overall Tour Alsace
2019
2nd Time trial, National Under-23 Road Championships
3rd Poreč Trophy
7th Overall Istrian Spring Trophy
2024
6th Overall Deutschland Tour
2025 (1 pro win)
1st Trofeo Serra Tramuntana
5th Road race, National Road Championships
6th GP Gippingen
2026
9th Eschborn–Frankfurt

=== Grand Tour general classification results timeline ===
Grand Tour	2023	2024
Giro d'Italia	DNF	74
Tour de France	—	—
Vuelta a España	—	—

Legend
—	Did not compete
DNF	Did not finish
