= Andrea Garosio =

Italian cyclist

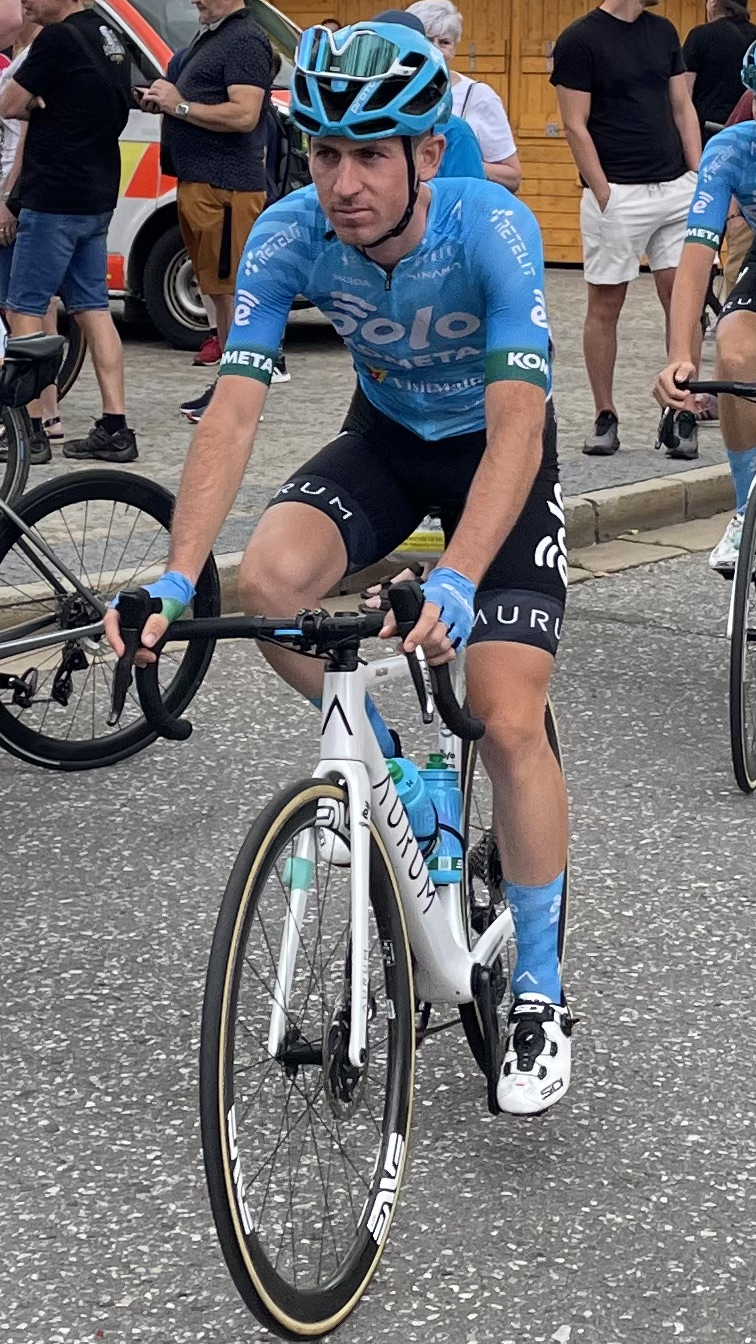
- Garosio in 2023

Personal information
- Full name: Andrea Garosio
- Born: 6 December 1993 (age 32) Brescia, Italy
- Height: 1.75 m (5 ft 9 in)
- Weight: 58 kg (128 lb)

Cycling career
- Sport: Cycling
- Discipline: Road
- Role: Rider

Amateur teams
- 2012: Casati–MI Impianti
- 2013–2014: Zalf Euromobil Désirée Fior
- 2015–2017: Team Colpack
- 2017: Bahrain–Merida (stagiaire)
- 2018: Bahrain–Merida (stagiaire)

Professional teams
- 2018: D'Amico Utensilnord
- 2019: Bahrain–Merida
- 2020: Vini Zabù–KTM
- 2021: Bardiani–CSF–Faizanè
- 2022: Biesse–Carrera
- 2023–2024: Eolo–Kometa

Andrea Garosio (born 6 December 1993) is an Italian cyclist, who last rode for UCI ProTeam Polti–Kometa. In May 2019, he was named in the startlist for the 2019 Giro d'Italia.

== Major results ==
2010
1st Trofeo Emilio Paganessi
6th Overall Giro della Lunigiana
6th Overall Tre Ciclista Bresciana
9th Trofeo Buffoni
10th Trofeo San Rocco
2011
4th Overall Giro della Lunigiana
7th Overall Tre Ciclista Bresciana
2013
10th Coppa della Pace
2014
5th Trofeo Alcide Degasperi
2017
3rd Giro del Medio Brenta
2018
7th Overall Giro della Regione Friuli Venezia Giulia
2019
10th Coppa Agostoni
2021
1st Mountains classification, Okolo Slovenska
9th Overall Adriatica Ionica Race
2022
1st Mountains classification, Settimana Internazionale di Coppi e Bartali
3rd Giro del Medio Brenta
5th Overall Giro della Friuli Venezia Giulia
5th Trofeo Città di Brescia
8th Per sempre Alfredo
2024
10th Overall Okolo Slovenska

=== Grand Tour general classification results timeline ===
Grand Tour	2019
Giro d'Italia	98
Tour de France	—
Vuelta a España	—
