= Gil Gelders =

Belgian cyclist

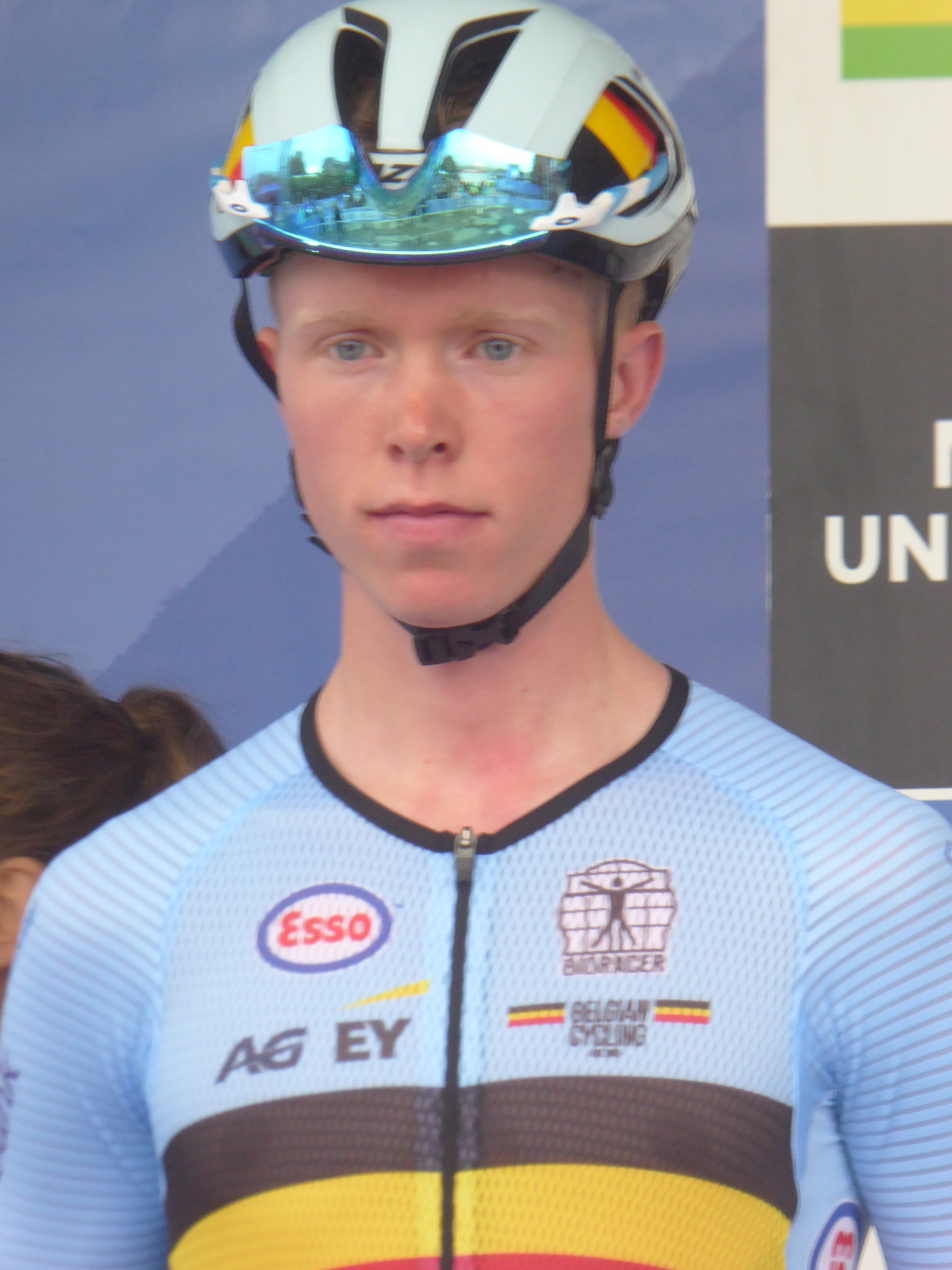
- Gelders at the 2023 UCI Road World Championships

Personal information
- Born: 16 December 2002 (age 23) Asse, Belgium
- Height: 1.81 m (5 ft 11 in)
- Weight: 66 kg (146 lb)

Cycling career
- Sport: Cycling
- Current team: Soudal–Quick-Step
- Discipline: Road
- Role: Rider

Amateur team
- 2019–2020: Onder Ons Parike WZW

Professional team
- 2021–2022: Bingoal WB Development Team
- 2023: Soudal–Quick-Step Devo Team
- 2024–: Soudal–Quick-Step

Gil Gelders (born 16 December 2002) is a Belgian cyclist, who currently rides for UCI WorldTeam Soudal–Quick-Step.

== Major results ==
2019
2nd La Philippe Gilbert Juniors
2021
10th Overall Tour du Pays de Montbéliard
2022
1st Grote Prijs Affligem
1st Stage 5 Giro d'Italia Giovani Under 23
2nd Overall Tour de Namur
2nd Grand Prix Criquielion
6th Overall Ronde de l'Isard
9th Coppa Zappi
2023
1st Gent–Wevelgem Beloften
1st Stage 2 Giro Next Gen
2nd Paris–Roubaix Espoirs
4th Time trial, National Under-23 Road Championships
7th Liège–Bastogne–Liège Espoirs
2024
7th Overall Okolo Slovenska

1st Young rider classification

9th Overall Deutschland Tour
