= Sylvain Moniquet =

Belgian cyclist

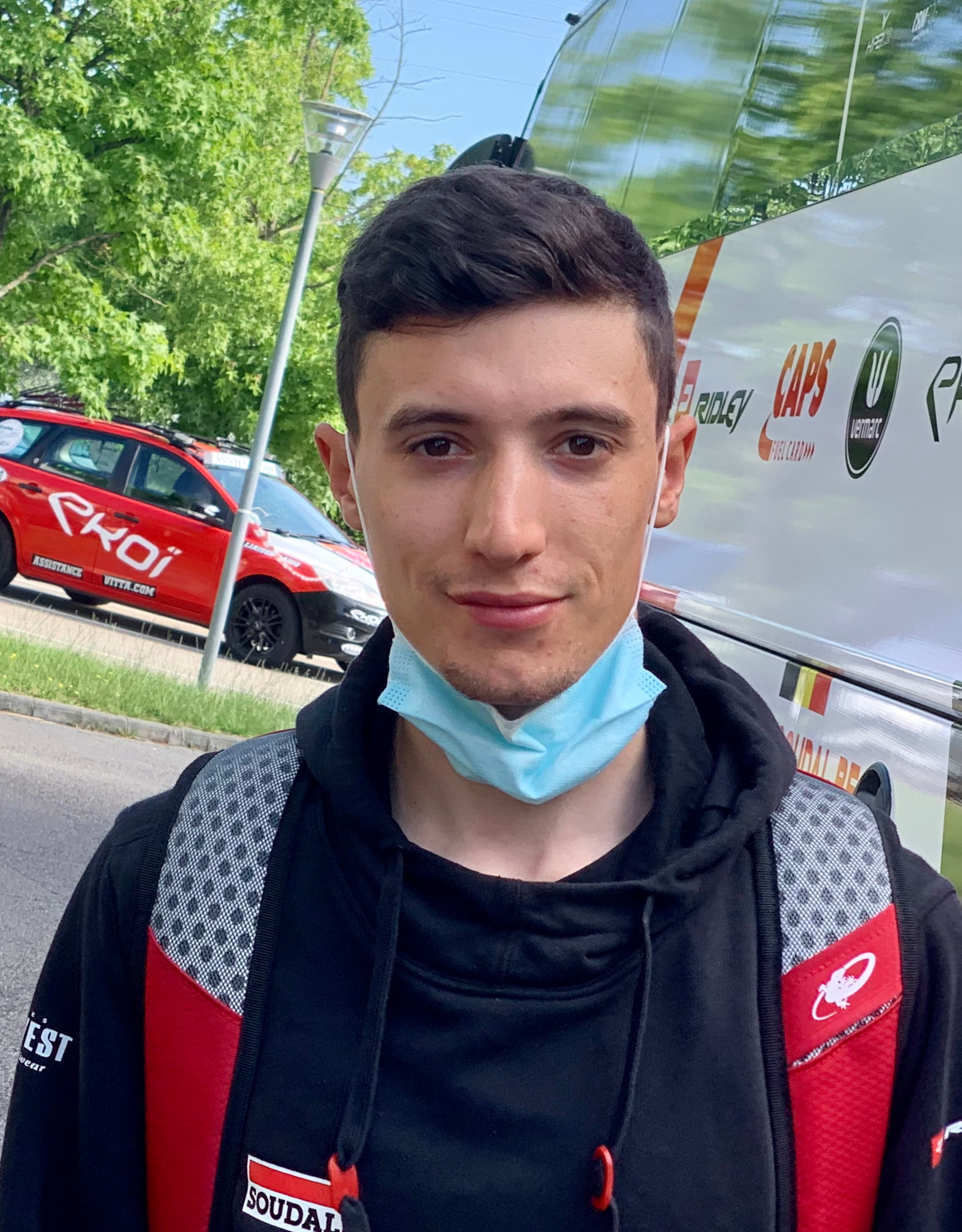

Personal information
- Born: 14 January 1998 (age 28) Namur, Belgium
- Height: 1.77 m (5 ft 10 in)
- Weight: 60 kg (132 lb)

Cycling career
- Sport: Cycling
- Current team: Cofidis
- Discipline: Road
- Role: Rider

Amateur team
- 2015–2016: Verandas Willems–Crabbe Toitures–CC Chevigny Juniors

Professional teams
- 2017–2018: AGO–Aqua Service
- 2019: Wallonie–Bruxelles Development Team
- 2020: Équipe Continentale Groupama–FDJ
- 2021–2024: Lotto–Soudal
- 2025–: Cofidis

Sylvain Moniquet (born 14 January 1998 in Namur) is a Belgian cyclist, who currently rides for UCI WorldTeam Cofidis.

== Major results ==
2016
6th Overall Giro di Basilicata
2018
4th Overall Tour du Jura Cycliste
2019
1st Overall Triptyque Ardennais

1st Stage 3

4th Overall Tour de Liège
6th Overall Grand Prix Priessnitz spa
2020
4th Piccolo Giro di Lombardia
7th Overall Ronde de l'Isard
8th Overall Tour de Savoie Mont-Blanc
2022
7th Overall Deutschland Tour
8th Classic Grand Besançon Doubs
2023
5th Overall Tour de Hongrie
10th Overall Tour of Guangxi
10th Mercan'Tour Classic
2024
5th Overall Sibiu Cycling Tour
6th Overall Settimana Internazionale di Coppi e Bartali
6th Overall Okolo Slovenska
9th Classic Grand Besançon Doubs
Vuelta a España

Held after Stages 4–7

2025 (1 pro win)
3rd Overall Tour du Limousin

1st Stage 2

5th Overall Tour de l'Ain
Giro d'Italia

Held after Stages 1–2

=== Grand Tour general classification results timeline ===
Grand Tour	2021	2022	2023
Giro d'Italia	—	48	—
Tour de France	—	—	—
Vuelta a España	83	—	94

Legend
—	Did not compete
DNF	Did not finish
