= 2022 Deutschland Tour =

2022 UCI Europe Tour 2022 UCI ProSeries

Race details
- Dates: 24 – 28 August 2022
- Stages: 5
- Distance: 710.7 km (441.6 mi)
- Winning time: 16h 54' 56"

Results
Jersey awarded to the overall winner	Winner	Adam Yates (GBR)	(Ineos Grenadiers)
	Second	Pello Bilbao (ESP)	(Team Bahrain Victorious)
	Third	Ruben Guerreiro (POR)	(EF Education–EasyPost)
Jersey awarded to the points classification winner	Points	Pello Bilbao (ESP)	(Team Bahrain Victorious)
Jersey awarded to the mountains classification winner	Mountains	Jakob Geßner (GER)	(Team Lotto–Kern Haus)
Jersey awarded to the youth classification winner	Youth	Georg Zimmermann (GER)	(Intermarché–Wanty–Gobert Matériaux)
Jersey awarded to the team classification winner	Team	Movistar Team	

The 2022 Deutschland Tour is a men's road cycling stage race which took place from 24 to 28 August 2022. It is the 36th edition of the Deutschland Tour, which is rated as a 2.Pro event on the 2022 UCI Europe Tour and the 2022 UCI ProSeries calendars. This edition is the race's second in the UCI ProSeries.

== Teams ==
14 of the 19 UCI WorldTeams, two UCI ProTeams, three UCI Continental teams, and the German national team made up the twenty teams in the race.

UCI WorldTeams

- AG2R Citroën Team
- Team Bahrain Victorious
- Bora–Hansgrohe
- EF Education–EasyPost
- Ineos Grenadiers
- Intermarché–Wanty–Gobert Matériaux
- Israel–Premier Tech
- Team Jumbo–Visma
- Lotto–Soudal
- Movistar Team
- Quick-Step Alpha Vinyl Team
- Team DSM
- Trek–Segafredo
- UAE Team Emirates

UCI ProTeams

- Alpecin–Deceuninck
- B&B Hotels–KTM

UCI Continental Teams

- Dauner–Akkon
- Team Lotto–Kern Haus
- Saris Rouvy Sauerland Team

National Teams

- Germany

== Schedule ==
Stage characteristics and winners
Stage	Date	Route	Distance	Type	Stage winner
P	24 August	Weimar	2.7 km (1.7 mi)	Flat stage	Filippo Ganna (ITA)
1	25 August	Weimar to Meiningen	171 km (106 mi)	Mountain stage	Caleb Ewan (AUS)
2	26 August	Meiningen to Marburg	199 km (124 mi)	Mountain stage	Alexander Kristoff (NOR)
3	27 August	Freiburg to Schauinsland	150 km (93 mi)	Medium-mountain stage	Adam Yates (GBR)
4	28 August	Schiltach to Stuttgart	188 km (117 mi)	Mountain stage	Pello Bilbao (ESP)
Total			710.7 km (441.6 mi)		

== Stages ==
=== Prologue ===
24 August 2022 – Weimar, 2.7 km (1.7 mi)

Prologue Result
Rank	Rider	Team	Time
1	Filippo Ganna (ITA)	Ineos Grenadiers	2' 56"
2	Bauke Mollema (NED)	Team Bahrain Victorious	+ 2"
3	Nils Politt (GER)	Bora–Hansgrohe	+ 3"
4	Mick van Dijke (NED)	Team Jumbo–Visma	+ 5"
5	Yves Lampaert (BEL)	Quick-Step Alpha Vinyl Team	+ 5"
6	Ben Healy (IRL)	EF Education–EasyPost	+ 5"
7	Adam Yates (GBR)	Ineos Grenadiers	+ 6"
8	Alberto Bettiol (ITA)	EF Education–EasyPost	+ 6"
9	Tobias Foss (NOR)	Team Jumbo–Visma	+ 6"
10	Kim Heiduk (GER)	Ineos Grenadiers	+ 6"

General classification after Prologue
Rank	Rider	Team	Time
1	Filippo Ganna (ITA)	Ineos Grenadiers	2' 56"
2	Bauke Mollema (NED)	Team Bahrain Victorious	+ 2"
3	Nils Politt (GER)	Bora–Hansgrohe	+ 3"
4	Mick van Dijke (NED)	Team Jumbo–Visma	+ 5"
5	Yves Lampaert (BEL)	Quick-Step Alpha Vinyl Team	+ 5"
6	Ben Healy (IRL)	EF Education–EasyPost	+ 5"
7	Adam Yates (GBR)	Ineos Grenadiers	+ 6"
8	Alberto Bettiol (ITA)	EF Education–EasyPost	+ 6"
9	Tobias Foss (NOR)	Team Jumbo–Visma	+ 6"
10	Kim Heiduk (GER)	Ineos Grenadiers	+ 6"

=== Stage 1 ===
25 August 2022 – Weimar to Meiningen, 171 km (106 mi)

Stage 1 Result
Rank	Rider	Team	Time
1	Caleb Ewan (AUS)	Lotto–Soudal	4h 01' 54"
2	Jonathan Milan (ITA)	Team Bahrain Victorious	+ 0"
3	Max Kanter (GER)	Movistar Team	+ 0"
4	Felix Groß (GER)	UAE Team Emirates	+ 0"
5	Florian Sénéchal (FRA)	Quick-Step Alpha Vinyl Team	+ 0"
6	Alexander Kristoff (NOR)	Intermarché–Wanty–Gobert Matériaux	+ 0"
7	Jérémy Lecroq (FRA)	B&B Hotels–KTM	+ 0"
8	Tim Teutenberg (GER)	Germany	+ 0"
9	Lawrence Naesen (BEL)	AG2R Citroën Team	+ 0"
10	Marius Mayrhofer (GER)	Team DSM	+ 0"

General classification after Stage 1
Rank	Rider	Team	Time
1	Filippo Ganna (ITA)	Ineos Grenadiers	4h 04' 50"
2	Bauke Mollema (NED)	Team Bahrain Victorious	+ 2"
3	Nils Politt (GER)	Bora–Hansgrohe	+ 3"
4	Jonathan Milan (ITA)	Team Bahrain Victorious	+ 3"
5	Mick van Dijke (NED)	Team Jumbo–Visma	+ 5"
6	Adam Yates (GBR)	Ineos Grenadiers	+ 6"
7	Alberto Bettiol (ITA)	EF Education–EasyPost	+ 6"
8	Tobias Foss (NOR)	Team Jumbo–Visma	+ 6"
9	Kim Heiduk (GER)	Ineos Grenadiers	+ 6"
10	Lars Boven (NED)	Team Jumbo–Visma	+ 7"

=== Stage 2 ===
26 August 2022 – Meiningen to Marburg, 199 km (124 mi)

Stage 2 Result
Rank	Rider	Team	Time
1	Alexander Kristoff (NOR)	Intermarché–Wanty–Gobert Matériaux	4h 57' 37"
2	Florian Sénéchal (FRA)	Quick-Step Alpha Vinyl Team	+ 0"
3	Alberto Bettiol (ITA)	EF Education–EasyPost	+ 0"
4	Greg Van Avermaet (BEL)	AG2R Citroën Team	+ 0"
5	Max Kanter (GER)	Movistar Team	+ 0"
6	Matthew Holmes (GBR)	Lotto–Soudal	+ 0"
7	Lilian Calmejane (FRA)	AG2R Citroën Team	+ 0"
8	Patrick Konrad (AUT)	Bora–Hansgrohe	+ 0"
9	Mikkel Bjerg (DEN)	UAE Team Emirates	+ 0"
10	Georg Zimmermann (GER)	Intermarché–Wanty–Gobert Matériaux	+ 0"

General classification after Stage 2
Rank	Rider	Team	Time
1	Alberto Bettiol (ITA)	EF Education–EasyPost	9h 02' 27"
2	Alexander Kristoff (NOR)	Intermarché–Wanty–Gobert Matériaux	+ 0"
3	Filippo Ganna (ITA)	Ineos Grenadiers	+ 0"
4	Bauke Mollema (NED)	Trek–Segafredo	+ 2"
5	Mick van Dijke (NED)	Team Jumbo–Visma	+ 5"
6	Adam Yates (GBR)	Ineos Grenadiers	+ 6"
7	Florian Sénéchal (FRA)	Quick-Step Alpha Vinyl Team	+ 6"
8	Tobias Foss (NOR)	Team Jumbo–Visma	+ 6"
9	Lars Boven (NED)	Team Jumbo–Visma	+ 7"
10	Sean Quinn (USA)	EF Education–EasyPost	+ 7"

=== Stage 3 ===
27 August 2022 – Freiburg to Schauinsland, 150 km (93 mi)

Stage 3 Result
Rank	Rider	Team	Time
1	Adam Yates (GBR)	Ineos Grenadiers	3h 41' 19"
2	Pello Bilbao (ESP)	Team Bahrain Victorious	+ 19"
3	Mauri Vansevenant (BEL)	Quick-Step Alpha Vinyl Team	+ 28"
4	Ruben Guerreiro (POR)	EF Education–EasyPost	+ 28"
5	Georg Zimmermann (GER)	Intermarché–Wanty–Gobert Matériaux	+ 29"
6	James Knox (GBR)	Quick-Step Alpha Vinyl Team	+ 31"
7	Mattias Skjelmose Jensen (DEN)	Trek–Segafredo	+ 33"
8	Laurens Huys (BEL)	Intermarché–Wanty–Gobert Matériaux	+ 34"
9	Iván Sosa (COL)	Movistar Team	+ 35"
10	Sylvain Moniquet (BEL)	Lotto–Soudal	+ 36"

General classification after Stage 3
Rank	Rider	Team	Time
1	Adam Yates (GBR)	Ineos Grenadiers	12h 43' 39"
2	Pello Bilbao (ESP)	Team Bahrain Victorious	+ 30"
3	Mauri Vansevenant (BEL)	Quick-Step Alpha Vinyl Team	+ 48"
4	Mattias Skjelmose Jensen (DEN)	Trek–Segafredo	+ 48"
5	Georg Zimmermann (GER)	Intermarché–Wanty–Gobert Matériaux	+ 49"
6	Ruben Guerreiro (POR)	EF Education–EasyPost	+ 51"
7	James Knox (GBR)	Quick-Step Alpha Vinyl Team	+ 56"
8	Sylvain Moniquet (BEL)	Lotto–Soudal	+ 56"
9	Laurens Huys (BEL)	Intermarché–Wanty–Gobert Matériaux	+ 1' 02"
10	Iván Sosa (COL)	Movistar Team	+ 1' 06"

=== Stage 4 ===
28 August 2022 – Schiltach to Stuttgart, 188 km (117 mi)

Stage 4 Result
Rank	Rider	Team	Time
1	Pello Bilbao (ESP)	Team Bahrain Victorious	4h 11' 19"
2	Ruben Guerreiro (POR)	EF Education–EasyPost	+ 0"
3	Georg Zimmermann (GER)	Intermarché–Wanty–Gobert Matériaux	+ 0"
4	Sylvain Moniquet (BEL)	Lotto–Soudal	+ 0"
5	Adam Yates (GBR)	Ineos Grenadiers	+ 0"
6	Davide Formolo (ITA)	UAE Team Emirates	+ 0"
7	Alberto Bettiol (ITA)	EF Education–EasyPost	+ 0"
8	Mauri Vansevenant (BEL)	Quick-Step Alpha Vinyl Team	+ 0"
9	James Knox (GBR)	Quick-Step Alpha Vinyl Team	+ 0"
10	Hermann Pernsteiner (AUT)	Team Bahrain Victorious	+ 0"

General classification after Stage 4
Rank	Rider	Team	Time
1	Adam Yates (GBR)	Ineos Grenadiers	16h 54' 56"
2	Pello Bilbao (ESP)	Team Bahrain Victorious	+ 22"
3	Ruben Guerreiro (POR)	EF Education–EasyPost	+ 44"
4	Georg Zimmermann (GER)	Intermarché–Wanty–Gobert Matériaux	+ 47"
5	Mauri Vansevenant (BEL)	Quick-Step Alpha Vinyl Team	+ 49"
6	James Knox (GBR)	Quick-Step Alpha Vinyl Team	+ 58"
7	Sylvain Moniquet (BEL)	Lotto–Soudal	+ 58"
8	Antonio Pedrero (ESP)	Movistar Team	+ 1' 14"
9	Iván Sosa (COL)	Movistar Team	+ 1' 36"
10	Davide Formolo (ITA)	UAE Team Emirates	+ 1' 44"

== Classification leadership table ==
Classification leadership by stage
Stage	Winner	General classification	Points classification	Mountains classification	Young rider classification	Team classification	Combativity award
P	Filippo Ganna	Filippo Ganna	Filippo Ganna	Olav Kooij	Mick van Dijke	Ineos Grenadiers	
1	Caleb Ewan	Filippo Ganna	Filippo Ganna	Jakob Geßner	Jonathan Milan	EF Education–EasyPost	
2	Alexander Kristoff	Alberto Bettiol	Alexander Kristoff	Jakob Geßner	Mick van Dijke	EF Education–EasyPost	
3	Adam Yates	Adam Yates	Alexander Kristoff	Jakob Geßner	Mauri Vansevenant	Movistar Team	
4	Peio Bilbao	Adam Yates	Peio Bilbao	Jakob Geßner	Georg Zimmermann	Movistar Team	
Final		Adam Yates	Pello Bilbao	Jakob Geßner	Georg Zimmermann	Movistar Team	

== Final classification standings ==
Legend
Denotes the winner of the general classification	Denotes the winner of the young rider classification
Denotes the winner of the points classification	Denotes the winner of the team classification
Denotes the winner of the mountains classification	Denotes the winner of the combativity award

=== General classification ===
Final general classification (1–10)
Rank	Rider	Team	Time
1	Adam Yates (GBR)	Ineos Grenadiers	16h 54' 56"
2	Pello Bilbao (ESP)	Team Bahrain Victorious	+ 22"
3	Ruben Guerreiro (POR)	EF Education–EasyPost	+ 44"
4	Georg Zimmermann (GER)	Intermarché–Wanty–Gobert Matériaux	+ 47"
5	Mauri Vansevenant (BEL)	Quick-Step Alpha Vinyl Team	+ 49"
6	James Knox (GBR)	Quick-Step Alpha Vinyl Team	+ 58"
7	Sylvain Moniquet (BEL)	Lotto–Soudal	+ 58"
8	Antonio Pedrero (ESP)	Movistar Team	+ 1' 14"
9	Iván Sosa (COL)	Movistar Team	+ 1' 36"
10	Davide Formolo (ITA)	UAE Team Emirates	+ 1' 44"

=== Points classification ===
Final points classification (1–10)
Rank	Rider	Team	Points
1	Pello Bilbao (ESP)	Team Bahrain Victorious	27
2	Adam Yates (GBR)	Ineos Grenadiers	25
3	Alexander Kristoff (NOR)	Intermarché–Wanty–Gobert Matériaux	20
4	Ruben Guerreiro (POR)	EF Education–EasyPost	19
5	Florian Sénéchal (FRA)	Quick-Step Alpha Vinyl Team	18
6	Bauke Mollema (NED)	Trek–Segafredo	17
7	Michiel Stockman (BEL)	Saris Rouvy Sauerland Team	16
8	Georg Zimmermann (GER)	Intermarché–Wanty–Gobert Matériaux	16
9	Alberto Bettiol (ITA)	EF Education–EasyPost	16
10	Filippo Ganna (ITA)	Ineos Grenadiers	15

=== Mountains classification ===
Final mountains classification (1–10)
Rank	Rider	Team	Points
1	Jakob Geßner (GER)	Team Lotto–Kern Haus	18
2	Romain Bardet (FRA)	Team DSM	12
3	Roman Duckert (GER)	Dauner–Akkon	7
4	Frederik Raßmann (GER)	Dauner–Akkon	6
5	Harm Vanhoucke (BEL)	Lotto–Soudal	6
6	Pello Bilbao (ESP)	Team Bahrain Victorious	6
7	Michiel Stockman (BEL)	Saris Rouvy Sauerland Team	6
8	Adam Yates (GBR)	Ineos Grenadiers	5
9	Jan Hugger (FRA)	Team Lotto–Kern Haus	5
10	Mauri Vansevenant (BEL)	Quick-Step Alpha Vinyl Team	4

=== Young rider classification ===
Final young rider classification (1–10)
Rank	Rider	Team	Time
1	Georg Zimmermann (GER)	Intermarché–Wanty–Gobert Matériaux	16h 55' 43"
2	Mauri Vansevenant (BEL)	Quick-Step Alpha Vinyl Team	+ 2"
3	Sylvain Moniquet (BEL)	Lotto–Soudal	+ 11"
4	Iván Sosa (COL)	Movistar Team	+ 49"
5	Gijs Leemreize (NED)	Team Jumbo–Visma	+ 2' 03"
6	Mikkel Bjerg (DEN)	UAE Team Emirates	+ 2' 15"
7	Einer Rubio (COL)	Movistar Team	+ 2' 48"
8	Maxime Chevalier (FRA)	B&B Hotels–KTM	+ 3' 14"
9	Barnabás Peák (HUN)	Intermarché–Wanty–Gobert Matériaux	+ 3' 27"
10	Johannes Adamietz (GER)	Saris Rouvy Sauerland Team	+ 3' 58"

=== Team classification ===
Final team classification (1–10)
Rank	Team	Time
1	Movistar Team	50h 50' 49"
2	Intermarché–Wanty–Gobert Matériaux	+ 23"
3	EF Education–EasyPost	+ 56"
4	UAE Team Emirates	+ 1' 26"
5	Team Jumbo–Visma	+ 7' 35"
6	AG2R Citroën Team	+ 9' 24"
7	Bora–Hansgrohe	+ 16' 12"
8	B&B Hotels–KTM	+ 16' 50"
9	Quick-Step Alpha Vinyl Team	+ 16' 58"
10	Team Bahrain Victorious	+ 25' 10"
