= Emmanuel Houcou =

French cyclist (born 2003)

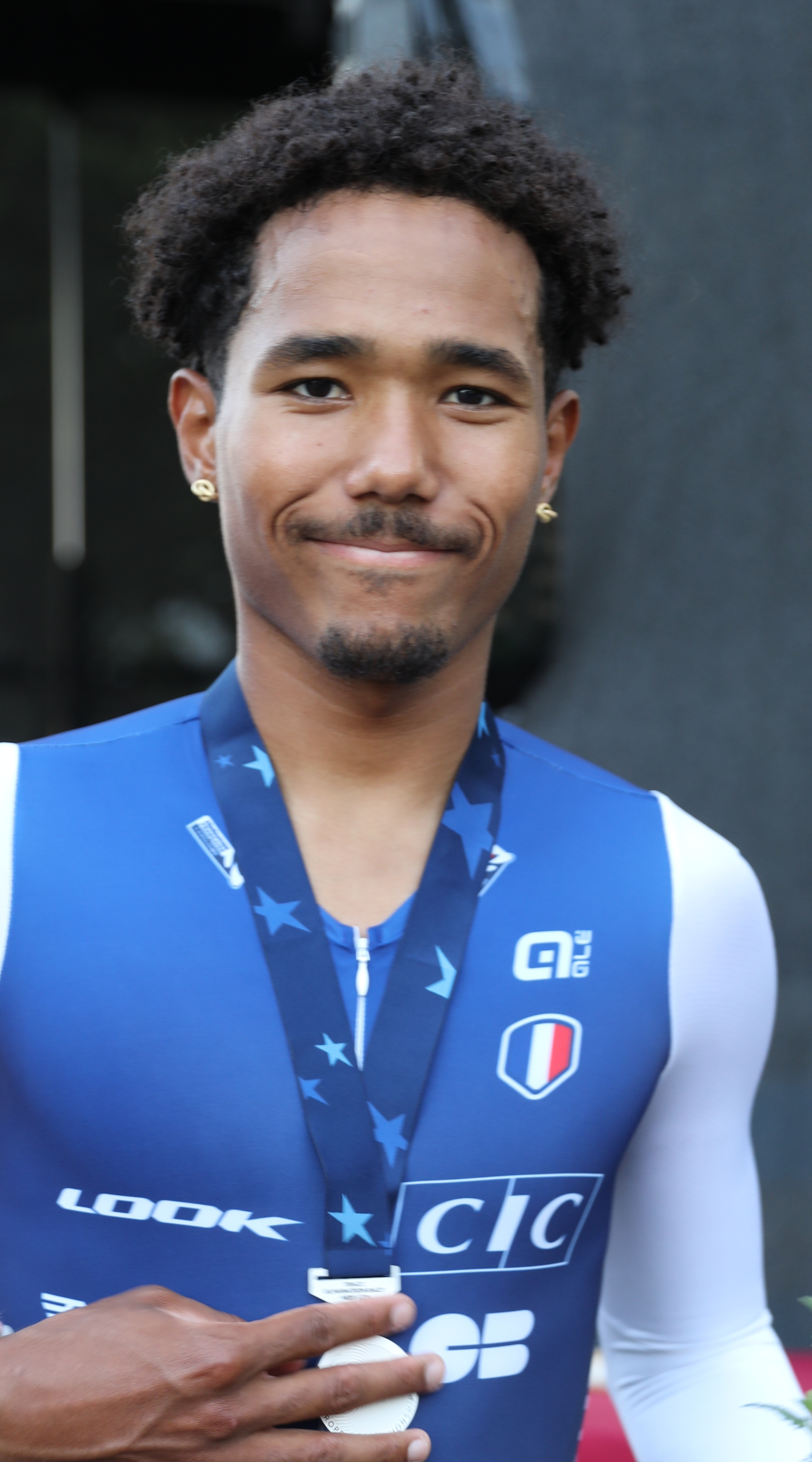
- Houcou in 2024

Personal information
- Born: 14 February 2003 (age 23) Schœlcher, France
- Height: 1.84 m (6 ft 0 in)

Cycling career
- Sport: Cycling
- Current team: Pinarello–Q36.5 Pro Cycling Team
- Disciplines: Road; Track
- Role: Rider
- Rider type: Sprinter (road)

Amateur teams
- 2020–2021: VS Hyérois
- 2022–2024: AVC Aix-en-Provence

Professional teams
- 2025: Arkéa–B&B Hôtels Continentale
- 2026–: Pinarello–Q36.5 Pro Cycling Team

Emmanuel Houcou (born 14 February 2003) is a French professional road cyclist, who currently rides for UCI ProTeam Pinarello–Q36.5 Pro Cycling Team.

In 2025, Houcou became the first Martinican cyclist to turn professional while also pursuing a degree in Sports Science at Aix-Marseille University.

== Major results ==
=== Road ===
2024
2nd Paris–Troyes
8th Overall Tour d'Eure-et-Loir
2025
1st Stage 1 Orlen Nations Grand Prix
1st Stage 1 (TTT) Tour Alsace
2nd Grand Prix de Plouay
2nd Youngster Coast Challenge
4th Tour des 100 Communes
6th Paris–Troyes
9th Paris–Roubaix Espoirs
9th Grand Prix de la Ville de Lillers

=== Track ===
2021
2nd Team pursuit, UEC European Junior Championships
2022
1st Team pursuit, National Championships
2024
2nd Elimination race, UEC European Under-23 Championships
2025
2nd Elimination race, UEC European Under-23 Championships
