= Florian Dauphin =

French cyclist

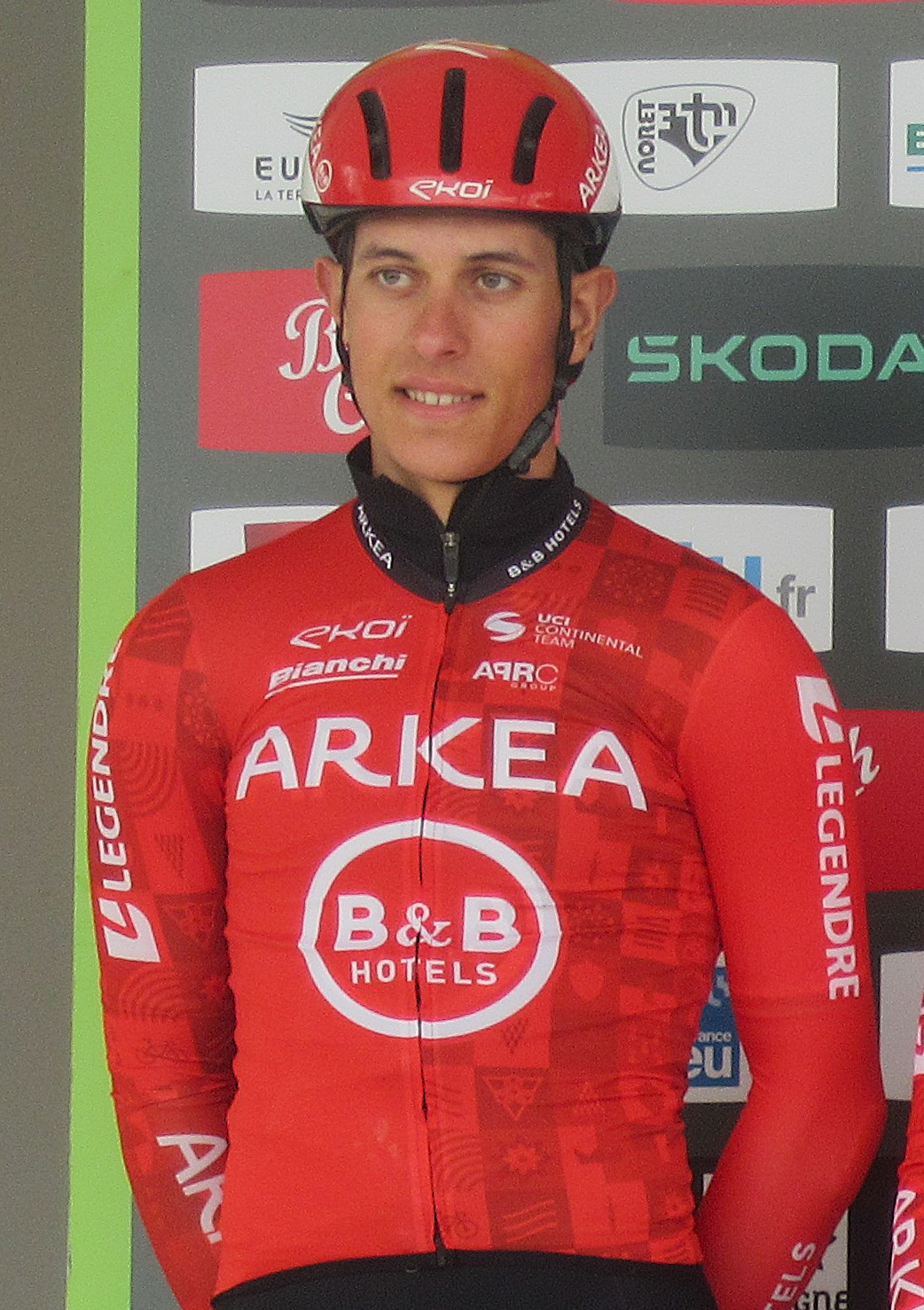
- Dauphin in 2024

Personal information
- Born: 6 April 1999 (age 27) Quimperlé, France
- Height: 1.80 m (5 ft 11 in)
- Weight: 70 kg (154 lb)

Cycling career
- Sport: Cycling
- Current team: Team TotalEnergies
- Discipline: Road
- Role: Rider

Amateur teams
- 2018: VS Valletais
- 2019–2020: Sojasun Espoir–ACNC
- 2021–2022: VC Pays de Loudéac
- 2023: Cre'Actuel–Marie Morin–U22

Professional teams
- 2021: B&B Hotels p/b KTM (stagiaire)
- 2022: B&B Hotels–KTM (stagiaire)
- 2023: Arkéa–Samsic (stagiaire)
- 2024: Arkéa–B&B Hôtels Continentale
- 2025–: Team TotalEnergies

Florian Dauphin (born 6 April 1999) is a French cyclist, who currently rides for UCI ProTeam Team TotalEnergies.

== Major results ==
2020
2nd Road race, National Under-23 Road Championships
3rd Paris–Tours Espoirs
2021
7th Paris–Tours Espoirs
2022
4th Overall Essor breton
7th Overall Trois Jours de Cherbourg
9th Binche–Chimay–Binche
2023
1st Overall La Sportbreizh

1st Stage 1

1st Overall Essor breton
1st Overall Estivale bretonne
1st Grand Prix de Fougères
1st Ronde mayennaise
1st Stage 2 Tour des Deux-Sèvres
3rd Overall Kreiz Breizh Elites
5th Grand Prix de Plouay
7th Overall Tour d'Eure-et-Loir
2024
1st Overall Kreiz Breizh Elites

1st Stage 2

4th Overall Tour d'Eure-et-Loir
2025
6th Ronde van Limburg
7th La Roue Tourangelle
2026
6th Münsterland Giro
9th Le Samyn
10th Famenne Ardenne Classic
