= Pierre Thierry (cyclist) =

French cyclist (born 2003)

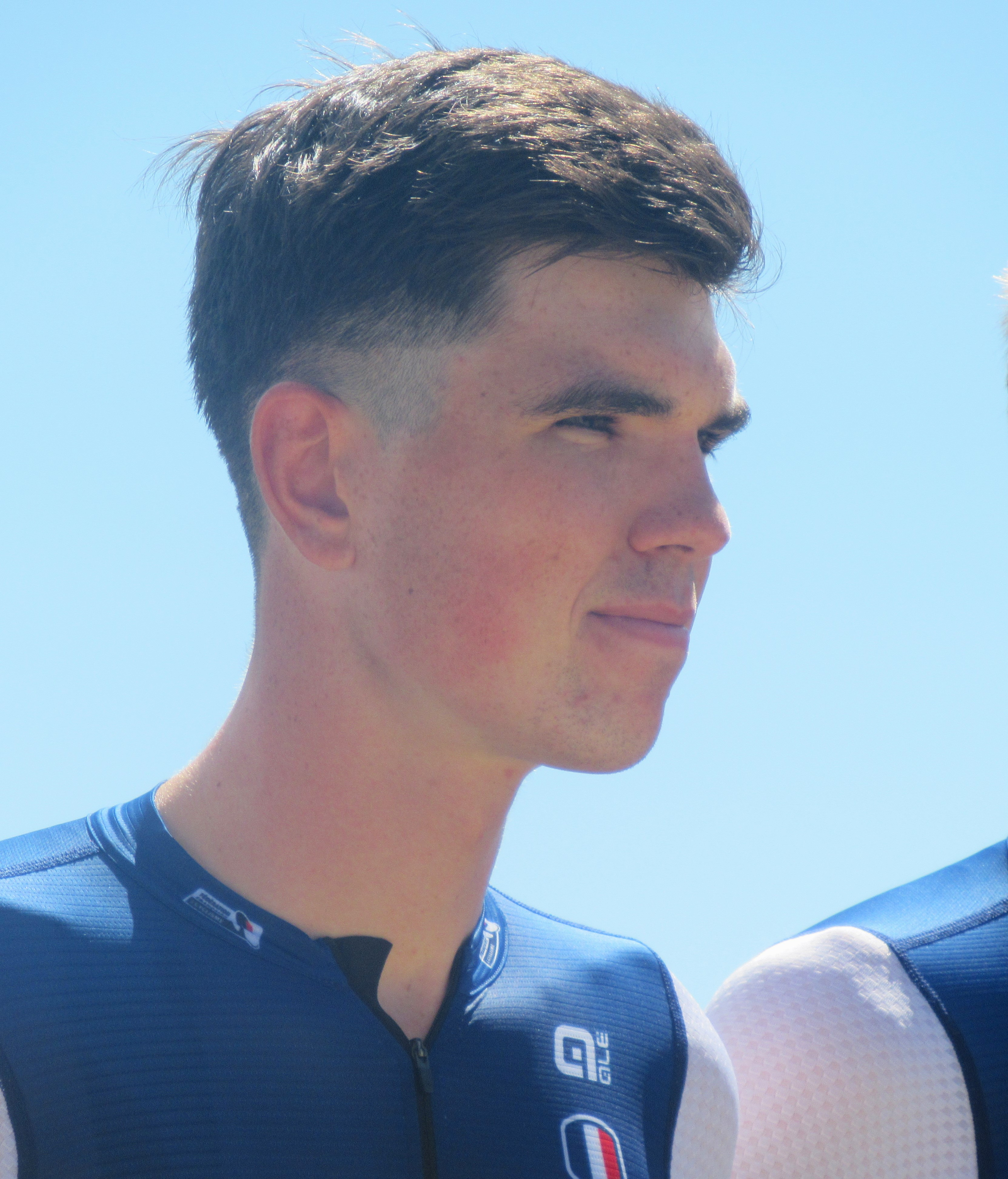
- Thierry in 2023

Personal information
- Born: 31 May 2003 (age 23) Sérent, France
- Height: 1.85 m (6 ft 1 in)

Cycling career
- Sport: Cycling
- Current team: Team TotalEnergies
- Discipline: Road
- Role: Rider

Amateur teams
- 2020–2021: Club Bretagne Juniors
- 2022–2023: WB–Fybolia Morbihan

Professional teams
- 2022: Arkéa–Samsic (stagiaire)
- 2024: Arkéa–B&B Hôtels Continentale
- 2024–2025: Arkéa–B&B Hotels
- 2026–: Team TotalEnergies

Pierre Thierry (born 31 May 2003) is a French cyclist, who currently rides for UCI ProTeam Team TotalEnergies.

== Major results ==
2021
2nd Time trial, National Junior Road Championships
7th Overall Ronde des Vallées
9th Chrono des Nations Junior
2022
3rd Time trial, National Under-23 Road Championships
3rd Chrono des Nations Espoirs
4th Overall Kreiz Breizh Elites

1st Young rider classification

6th Paris–Tours Espoirs
2023
1st Overall Boucle de l'Artois

1st Young rider classification
1st Stage 2

1st Grand Prix de Plouay
1st Paris-Connerré
5th Overall Kreiz Breizh Elites

1st Young rider classification
1st Stage 4

8th Overall Tour de Bretagne
2024
5th Overall Kreiz Breizh Elites
