= Johannes Adamietz =

German cyclist

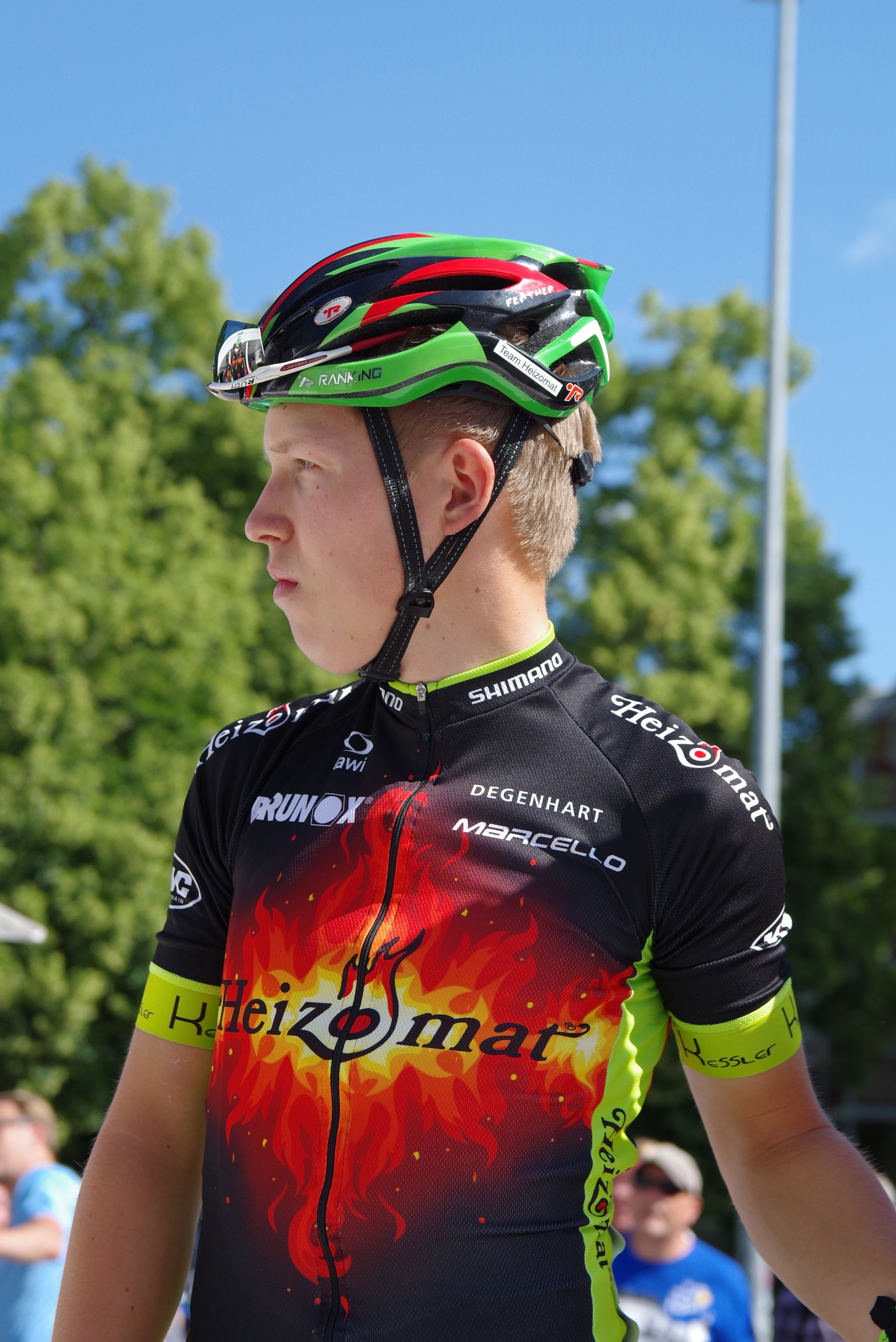
- Adamietz in 2017

Personal information
- Born: 24 May 1998 (age 28) Ulm, Germany
- Height: 1.74 m (5 ft 9 in)
- Weight: 61 kg (134 lb)

Cycling career
- Sport: Cycling
- Current team: Rembe / Rad-Net
- Discipline: Road
- Role: Rider
- Rider type: Climber

Professional teams
- 2017: Team Heizomat
- 2018: Tirol Cycling Team
- 2019: Herrmann Radteam
- 2020–2022: Team SKS Sauerland NRW
- 2023–2024: Lotto–Dstny
- 2025–: Rembe / Rad-Net

Johannes Adamietz (born 24 May 1998) is a German professional racing cyclist, who currently rides for UCI Continental team Rembe / Rad-Net.

== Major results ==
2015
1st National Junior Hill Climb Championships
2016
1st National Junior Hill Climb Championships
2017
1st National Under-23 Hill Climb Championships
2019
2nd Road race, National Under-23 Road Championships
6th Overall Tour du Jura
2022
1st National Hill Climb Championships
2nd Sauerländer Bergpreis
3rd Rad am Ring
7th Overall Sibiu Cycling Tour
2024 (1 pro win)
1st Stage 4 Okolo Slovenska
3rd GP New York City
4th Overall Circuit des Ardennes
2025
7th Overall Tour of Japan
