= 2022 Settimana Internazionale di Coppi e Bartali =

Italian cycling race

2022 UCI Europe Tour

Race details
- Dates: 22–26 March 2022
- Stages: 5
- Distance: 796.5 km (494.9 mi)

Results
Jersey awarded to the overall winner	Winner	Eddie Dunbar (IRL)	(Ineos Grenadiers)
	Second	Ben Tulett (GBR)	(Ineos Grenadiers)
	Third	Marc Hirschi (SUI)	(UAE Team Emirates)
Jersey awarded to the points classification winner	Points	Ethan Hayter (GBR)	(Ineos Grenadiers)
Jersey awarded to the mountains classification winner	Mountains	Andrea Garosio (ITA)	(Biesse–Carrera)
Jersey awarded to the youth classification winner	Youth	Ben Tulett (GBR)	(Ineos Grenadiers)
	Team	Ineos Grenadiers	

The 2022 Settimana Internazionale di Coppi e Bartali was a road cycling stage race that took place between 22 and 26 March 2022 in the Italian region of Emilia-Romagna and in San Marino. The race was rated as a category 2.1 event on the 2022 UCI Europe Tour calendar, and was the 37th edition of the Settimana Internazionale di Coppi e Bartali.

== Teams ==
Ten of the 18 UCI WorldTeams, five UCI ProTeams, eight UCI Continental teams, and the Italian national team made up the 24 teams that participated in the race. Of these teams, 16 entered a full squad of seven riders. Four teams (Astana Qazaqstan Team, Israel–Premier Tech, Team Jumbo–Visma, and UAE Team Emirates) each entered six riders, three teams (EF Education–EasyPost, Quick-Step Alpha Vinyl Team, and Trek–Segafredo) each entered five riders, and only one team (Bora–Hansgrohe) entered four riders. Of the 155 riders who started the race, 99 finished.

UCI WorldTeams

- Astana Qazaqstan Team
- Bora–Hansgrohe
- EF Education–EasyPost
- Ineos Grenadiers
- Israel–Premier Tech
- Quick-Step Alpha Vinyl Team
- Team BikeExchange–Jayco
- Team Jumbo–Visma
- Trek–Segafredo
- UAE Team Emirates

UCI ProTeams

- Alpecin–Fenix
- Bardiani–CSF–Faizanè
- Bingoal Pauwels Sauces WB
- Drone Hopper–Androni Giocattoli
- Eolo–Kometa

UCI Continental Teams

- Beltrami TSA–Tre Colli
- Biesse–Carrera
- Colombia Tierra de Atletas–GW Shimano
- Giotti Victoria–Savini Due
- MG.K Vis Colors for Peace VPM
- Team Colpack–Ballan
- Team Corratec
- Work Service–Vitalcare–Vega

National Teams

- Italy

== Route ==
Stage characteristics and winners
Stage	Date	Course	Distance	Type	Winner
1	22 March	Riccione to Riccione	164.6 km (102.3 mi)	Hilly stage	Mauro Schmid (SUI)
2	23 March	Riccione to Longiano	165.9 km (103.1 mi)	Hilly stage	Ethan Hayter (GBR)
3	24 March	City of San Marino (San Marino) to City of San Marino	147.1 km (91.4 mi)	Mountain stage	Ben Tulett (GBR)
4	25 March	Montecatini Terme to Montecatini Terme	158.7 km (98.6 mi)	Hilly stage	Mathieu van der Poel (NED)
5	26 March	Casalguidi to Cantagrillo	160.2 km (99.5 mi)	Intermediate stage	Josef Černý (CZE)
Total			796.5 km (494.9 mi)		

== Stages ==
=== Stage 1 ===
22 March 2022 — Riccione to Riccione, 164.6 km (102.3 mi)

Stage 1 Result (1–10)
Rank	Rider	Team	Time
1	Mauro Schmid (SUI)	Quick-Step Alpha Vinyl Team	4h 12' 58"
2	Eddie Dunbar (IRL)	Ineos Grenadiers	+ 2"
3	Ethan Hayter (GBR)	Ineos Grenadiers	+ 16"
4	Mathieu van der Poel (NED)	Alpecin–Fenix	+ 16"
5	Natnael Tesfatsion (ERI)	Drone Hopper–Androni Giocattoli	+ 16"
6	Thomas Pesenti (ITA)	Beltrami TSA–Tre Colli	+ 16"
7	Diego Ulissi (ITA)	UAE Team Emirates	+ 16"
8	Matteo Sobrero (ITA)	Team BikeExchange–Jayco	+ 16"
9	Christian Scaroni (ITA)	Italy	+ 16"
10	Marc Hirschi (SUI)	UAE Team Emirates	+ 16"

General classification after Stage 1 (1–10)
Rank	Rider	Team	Time
1	Mauro Schmid (SUI)	Quick-Step Alpha Vinyl Team	4h 12' 48"
2	Eddie Dunbar (IRL)	Ineos Grenadiers	+ 6"
3	Ethan Hayter (GBR)	Ineos Grenadiers	+ 22"
4	Mathieu van der Poel (NED)	Alpecin–Fenix	+ 26"
5	Natnael Tesfatsion (ERI)	Drone Hopper–Androni Giocattoli	+ 26"
6	Thomas Pesenti (ITA)	Beltrami TSA–Tre Colli	+ 26"
7	Diego Ulissi (ITA)	UAE Team Emirates	+ 26"
8	Matteo Sobrero (ITA)	Team BikeExchange–Jayco	+ 26"
9	Christian Scaroni (ITA)	Italy	+ 26"
10	Marc Hirschi (SUI)	UAE Team Emirates	+ 26"

=== Stage 2 ===
23 March 2022 — Riccione to Longiano, 165.9 km (103.1 mi)

Stage 2 Result (1–10)
Rank	Rider	Team	Time
1	Ethan Hayter (GBR)	Ineos Grenadiers	4h 11' 46"
2	Matteo Sobrero (ITA)	Team BikeExchange–Jayco	+ 0"
3	Ben Tulett (GBR)	Ineos Grenadiers	+ 0"
4	Nicola Conci (ITA)	Italy	+ 0"
5	Natnael Tesfatsion (ERI)	Drone Hopper–Androni Giocattoli	+ 0"
6	Diego Ulissi (ITA)	UAE Team Emirates	+ 0"
7	Marc Hirschi (SUI)	UAE Team Emirates	+ 0"
8	Cian Uijtdebroeks (BEL)	Bora–Hansgrohe	+ 0"
9	Gianluca Brambilla (ITA)	Trek–Segafredo	+ 0"
10	Floris De Tier (BEL)	Alpecin–Fenix	+ 0"

General classification after Stage 2 (1–10)
Rank	Rider	Team	Time
1	Eddie Dunbar (IRL)	Ineos Grenadiers	8h 24' 40"
2	Ethan Hayter (GBR)	Ineos Grenadiers	+ 6"
3	Matteo Sobrero (ITA)	Team BikeExchange–Jayco	+ 14"
4	Ben Tulett (GBR)	Ineos Grenadiers	+ 16"
5	Natnael Tesfatsion (ERI)	Drone Hopper–Androni Giocattoli	+ 20"
6	Diego Ulissi (ITA)	UAE Team Emirates	+ 20"
7	Nicola Conci (ITA)	Italy	+ 20"
8	Marc Hirschi (SUI)	UAE Team Emirates	+ 20"
9	Thomas Pesenti (ITA)	Beltrami TSA–Tre Colli	+ 20"
10	Gianluca Brambilla (ITA)	Trek–Segafredo	+ 20"

=== Stage 3 ===
24 March 2022 — City of San Marino (San Marino) to City of San Marino, 147.1 km (91.4 mi)

Stage 3 Result (1–10)
Rank	Rider	Team	Time
1	Ben Tulett (GBR)	Ineos Grenadiers	4h 12' 34"
2	Eddie Dunbar (IRL)	Ineos Grenadiers	+ 3"
3	Marc Hirschi (SUI)	UAE Team Emirates	+ 5"
4	Simon Carr (GBR)	EF Education–EasyPost	+ 7"
5	Antonio Tiberi (ITA)	Trek–Segafredo	+ 12"
6	Diego Ulissi (ITA)	UAE Team Emirates	+ 25"
7	Cian Uijtdebroeks (BEL)	Bora–Hansgrohe	+ 25"
8	Gianluca Brambilla (ITA)	Trek–Segafredo	+ 38"
9	Nicola Conci (ITA)	Italy	+ 51"
10	Jefferson Alexander Cepeda (ECU)	Drone Hopper–Androni Giocattoli	+ 51"

General classification after Stage 3 (1–10)
Rank	Rider	Team	Time
1	Eddie Dunbar (IRL)	Ineos Grenadiers	12h 37' 11"
2	Ben Tulett (GBR)	Ineos Grenadiers	+ 9"
3	Marc Hirschi (SUI)	UAE Team Emirates	+ 24"
4	Simon Carr (GBR)	EF Education–EasyPost	+ 30"
5	Antonio Tiberi (ITA)	Trek–Segafredo	+ 45"
6	Diego Ulissi (ITA)	UAE Team Emirates	+ 48"
7	Cian Uijtdebroeks (BEL)	Bora–Hansgrohe	+ 48"
8	Gianluca Brambilla (ITA)	Trek–Segafredo	+ 1' 01"
9	Nicola Conci (ITA)	Italy	+ 1' 14"
10	Ethan Hayter (GBR)	Ineos Grenadiers	+ 1' 18"

=== Stage 4 ===
25 March 2022 — Montecatini Terme to Montecatini Terme, 158.7 km (98.6 mi)

Stage 4 Result (1–10)
Rank	Rider	Team	Time
1	Mathieu van der Poel (NED)	Alpecin–Fenix	3h 59' 49"
2	Ethan Hayter (GBR)	Ineos Grenadiers	+ 0"
3	Rémy Mertz (BEL)	Bingoal Pauwels Sauces WB	+ 0"
4	Dion Smith (NZL)	Team BikeExchange–Jayco	+ 0"
5	Mick van Dijke (NED)	Team Jumbo–Visma	+ 0"
6	Koen Bouwman (NED)	Team Jumbo–Visma	+ 0"
7	Jan Polanc (SLO)	UAE Team Emirates	+ 0"
8	Omer Goldstein (ISR)	Israel–Premier Tech	+ 0"
9	Erik Fetter (HUN)	Eolo–Kometa	+ 0"
10	Natnael Tesfatsion (ERI)	Drone Hopper–Androni Giocattoli	+ 0"

General classification after Stage 4 (1–10)
Rank	Rider	Team	Time
1	Eddie Dunbar (IRL)	Ineos Grenadiers	16h 37' 00"
2	Ben Tulett (GBR)	Ineos Grenadiers	+ 9"
3	Marc Hirschi (SUI)	UAE Team Emirates	+ 24"
4	Simon Carr (GBR)	EF Education–EasyPost	+ 30"
5	Antonio Tiberi (ITA)	Trek–Segafredo	+ 45"
6	Diego Ulissi (ITA)	UAE Team Emirates	+ 48"
7	Cian Uijtdebroeks (BEL)	Bora–Hansgrohe	+ 48"
8	Gianluca Brambilla (ITA)	Trek–Segafredo	+ 1' 01"
9	Ethan Hayter (GBR)	Ineos Grenadiers	+ 1' 12"
10	Nicola Conci (ITA)	Italy	+ 1' 14"

=== Stage 5 ===
26 March 2022 — Casalguidi to Cantagrillo, 160.2 km (99.5 mi)

Stage 5 Result (1–10)
Rank	Rider	Team	Time
1	Josef Černý (CZE)	Quick-Step Alpha Vinyl Team	3h 56' 55"
2	Rémi Cavagna (FRA)	Quick-Step Alpha Vinyl Team	+ 0"
3	Omer Goldstein (ISR)	Israel–Premier Tech	+ 14"
4	Julius van den Berg (NED)	EF Education–EasyPost	+ 46"
5	Frederik Wandahl (DEN)	Bora–Hansgrohe	+ 3' 03"
6	Fabio Van den Bossche (BEL)	Alpecin–Fenix	+ 3' 03"
7	Tom Paquot (BEL)	Bingoal Pauwels Sauces WB	+ 3' 03"
8	Giovanni Carboni (ITA)	Italy	+ 3' 05"
9	Natnael Tesfatsion (ERI)	Drone Hopper–Androni Giocattoli	+ 4' 23"
10	Diego Ulissi (ITA)	UAE Team Emirates	+ 4' 23"

General classification after Stage 5 (1–10)
Rank	Rider	Team	Time
1	Eddie Dunbar (IRL)	Ineos Grenadiers	20h 38' 18"
2	Ben Tulett (GBR)	Ineos Grenadiers	+ 9"
3	Marc Hirschi (SUI)	UAE Team Emirates	+ 24"
4	Simon Carr (GBR)	EF Education–EasyPost	+ 30"
5	Antonio Tiberi (ITA)	Trek–Segafredo	+ 45"
6	Diego Ulissi (ITA)	UAE Team Emirates	+ 48"
7	Jan Polanc (SLO)	UAE Team Emirates	+ 1' 23"
8	Gianluca Brambilla (ITA)	Trek–Segafredo	+ 1' 25"
9	Natnael Tesfatsion (ERI)	Drone Hopper–Androni Giocattoli	+ 1' 38"
10	Nicola Conci (ITA)	Italy	+ 1' 38"

== Classification leadership table ==
Classification leadership by stage
Stage	Winner	General classification	Points classification	Mountains classification	Young rider classification	Team classification
1	Mauro Schmid	Mauro Schmid	Mauro Schmid	Giovanni Bortoluzzi	Mauro Schmid	Ineos Grenadiers
2	Ethan Hayter	Eddie Dunbar	Ethan Hayter	Eddie Dunbar	Ethan Hayter	Ineos Grenadiers
3	Ben Tulett	Eddie Dunbar	Ben Tulett	Andrea Garosio	Ben Tulett	Ineos Grenadiers
4	Mathieu van der Poel	Eddie Dunbar	Ethan Hayter	Andrea Garosio	Ben Tulett	Ineos Grenadiers
5	Josef Černý	Eddie Dunbar	Ethan Hayter	Andrea Garosio	Ben Tulett	Ineos Grenadiers
Final		Eddie Dunbar	Ethan Hayter	Andrea Garosio	Ben Tulett	Ineos Grenadiers

- On stage 2, Eddie Dunbar, who was second in the points classification, wore the red jersey, because first-placed Mauro Schmid wore the white jersey as the leader of the general classification. For the same reason, Ethan Hayter, who was second in the young rider classification, wore the orange jersey.
- On stage 3, Edoardo Zardini, who was second in the mountains classification, wore the red jersey, because first-placed Eddie Dunbar wore the white jersey as the leader of the general classification.
- On stage 3, Ben Tulett, who was second in the young rider classification, wore the orange jersey, because first-placed Ethan Hayter wore the red jersey as the leader of the points classification.
- On stage 4, Marc Hirschi, who was second in the young rider classification, wore the orange jersey, because first-placed Ben Tulett wore the red jersey as the leader of the points classification.

== Final classification standings ==
Legend
Denotes the winner of the general classification	Denotes the winner of the mountains classification
Denotes the winner of the points classification	Denotes the winner of the young rider classification

=== General classification ===
Final general classification (1–10)
Rank	Rider	Team	Time
1	Eddie Dunbar (IRL)	Ineos Grenadiers	20h 38' 18"
2	Ben Tulett (GBR)	Ineos Grenadiers	+ 9"
3	Marc Hirschi (SUI)	UAE Team Emirates	+ 24"
4	Simon Carr (GBR)	EF Education–EasyPost	+ 30"
5	Antonio Tiberi (ITA)	Trek–Segafredo	+ 45"
6	Diego Ulissi (ITA)	UAE Team Emirates	+ 48"
7	Jan Polanc (SLO)	UAE Team Emirates	+ 1' 23"
8	Gianluca Brambilla (ITA)	Trek–Segafredo	+ 1' 25"
9	Natnael Tesfatsion (ERI)	Drone Hopper–Androni Giocattoli	+ 1' 38"
10	Nicola Conci (ITA)	Italy	+ 1' 38"

=== Points classification ===
Final points classification (1–10)
Rank	Rider	Team	Points
1	Ethan Hayter (GBR)	Ineos Grenadiers	24
2	Ben Tulett (GBR)	Ineos Grenadiers	16
3	Eddie Dunbar (IRL)	Ineos Grenadiers	16
4	Mathieu van der Poel (NED)	Alpecin–Fenix	15
5	Mauro Schmid (SUI)	Quick-Step Alpha Vinyl Team	10
6	Josef Černý (CZE)	Quick-Step Alpha Vinyl Team	10
7	Matteo Sobrero (ITA)	Team BikeExchange–Jayco	9
8	Marc Hirschi (SUI)	UAE Team Emirates	8
9	Diego Ulissi (ITA)	UAE Team Emirates	8
10	Natnael Tesfatsion (ERI)	Drone Hopper–Androni Giocattoli	8

=== Mountains classification ===
Final mountains classification (1–10)
Rank	Rider	Team	Points
1	Andrea Garosio (ITA)	Biesse–Carrera	42
2	Mattia Cattaneo (ITA)	Quick-Step Alpha Vinyl Team	20
3	Edoardo Zardini (ITA)	Drone Hopper–Androni Giocattoli	18
4	Josef Černý (CZE)	Quick-Step Alpha Vinyl Team	14
5	Rémi Cavagna (FRA)	Quick-Step Alpha Vinyl Team	12
6	Eddie Dunbar (IRL)	Ineos Grenadiers	11
7	Giovanni Bortoluzzi (ITA)	Work Service–Vitalcare–Vega	10
8	Omer Goldstein (ISR)	Israel–Premier Tech	10
9	James Shaw (GBR)	EF Education–EasyPost	10
10	Mathieu van der Poel (NED)	Alpecin–Fenix	9

=== Young rider classification ===
Final young rider classification (1–10)
Rank	Rider	Team	Time
1	Ben Tulett (GBR)	Ineos Grenadiers	20h 38' 27"
2	Marc Hirschi (SUI)	UAE Team Emirates	+ 15"
3	Simon Carr (GBR)	EF Education–EasyPost	+ 21"
4	Antonio Tiberi (ITA)	Trek–Segafredo	+ 36"
5	Natnael Tesfatsion (ERI)	Drone Hopper–Androni Giocattoli	+ 1' 29"
6	Ethan Hayter (GBR)	Ineos Grenadiers	+ 3' 05"
7	Johannes Staune-Mittet (NOR)	Team Jumbo–Visma	+ 3' 17"
8	Andrés Ardila (COL)	UAE Team Emirates	+ 4' 15"
9	Jefferson Alexander Cepeda (ECU)	Drone Hopper–Androni Giocattoli	+ 4' 15"
10	Gijs Leemreize (NED)	Team Jumbo–Visma	+ 4' 20"

=== Team classification ===
Final team classification (1–10)
Rank	Team	Time
1	Ineos Grenadiers	61h 57' 28"
2	UAE Team Emirates	+ 5"
3	Team Jumbo–Visma	+ 9' 42"
4	Drone Hopper–Androni Giocattoli	+ 10' 00"
5	Italy	+ 12' 49"
6	Bingoal Pauwels Sauces WB	+ 24' 13"
7	Team BikeExchange–Jayco	+ 29' 28"
8	Astana Qazaqstan Team	+ 33' 37"
9	Trek–Segafredo	+ 35' 09"
10	Alpecin–Fenix	+ 37' 23"
