= Arkéa–B&B Hôtels Continentale =

French cycling team

Team information
- UCI code: ABB
- Registered: France
- Founded: 2024
- Disciplines: Road; Cyclo-cross
- Status: UCI Continental
- Bicycles: Bianchi

Key personnel
- General manager: Emmanuel Hubert
- Team manager: Maxime Bouet

Team name history
- 2024–: Arkéa–B&B Hôtels Continentale

Arkéa–B&B Hôtels Continentale is a French UCI Continental team which was founded in 2024. It serves as a development team for the UCI WorldTeam Arkéa–B&B Hotels.

== Team roster ==
As of 2 July 2025.

Rider	Date of birth
Axel Bouquet (FRA)	2 February 2006 (age 20)
Jean-Loup Fayolle (FRA)	15 June 2005 (age 21)
Baptiste Gillet (FRA)	29 November 2004 (age 21)
Swann Gloux (FRA)	29 October 2003 (age 22)
Hugh Harvey (AUS)	11 January 2005 (age 21)
Emmanuel Houcou (FRA)	14 February 2003 (age 23)

Rider	Date of birth
Lucas Janssen (NED)	6 January 2003 (age 23)
Rémi Lelandais (FRA)	27 August 2002 (age 24)
Nicolas Milesi (ITA)	22 July 2004 (age 22)
Baptiste Poulard (FRA)	28 January 2003 (age 23)
Paul Thierry (FRA)	23 June 2006 (age 20)
Edoardo Zamperini (ITA)	19 March 2003 (age 23)

== Major wins ==
2024
Overall Kreiz Breizh Elites, Florian Dauphin

Stage 2, Florian Dauphin

== See also ==
- Arkéa–B&B Hotels
- Arkéa–B&B Hotels Women
