= 2024 Intermarché–Wanty season =

Intermarché–Wanty
- 2024 season
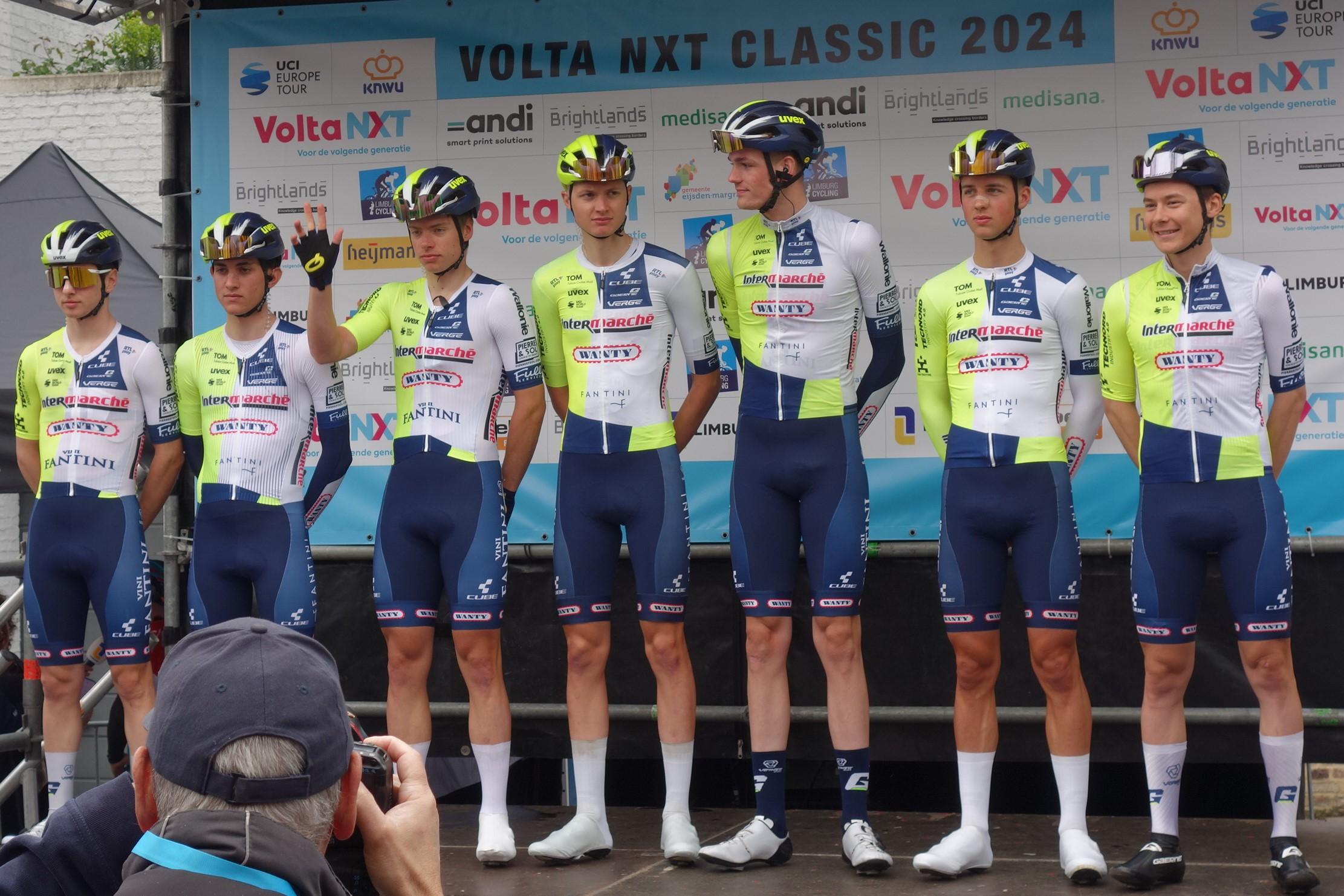
- UCI code: IWA
- Status: UCI WorldTeam
- Manager: Jean-François Bourlart (BEL)
- Main sponsor(s): Intermarché; Wanty
- Based: Belgium
- Bicycles: Cube
- Groupset: Shimano

Season victories
- One-day races: 5
- Stage race overall: 1
- Stage race stages: 6
- National Championships: 1
- Most wins: (Eritrea) Biniam Girmay (5)

The 2024 season for the Intermarché–Wanty is the 17th season in the team's existence, and its fourth as a UCI WorldTeam.

== Team roster ==
As of 14 April 2024.

Rider	Date of birth
Vito Braet (BEL)	2 November 2000 (aged 23)
Francesco Busatto (ITA)	1 November 2002 (aged 21)
Lilian Calmejane (FRA)	6 December 1992 (aged 31)
Kevin Colleoni (ITA)	11 November 1999 (aged 24)
Dries De Pooter (BEL)	8 November 2002 (aged 21)
Alexy Faure Prost (FRA)	22 April 2004 (aged 19)
Biniam Girmay (ERI)	2 April 2000 (aged 23)
Kobe Goossens (BEL)	29 April 1996 (aged 27)
Rune Herregodts (BEL)	27 July 1998 (aged 25)
Gerben Kuypers (Note: Joined on 4 April.) (BEL)	1 February 2000 (aged 23)
Arne Marit (BEL)	21 January 1999 (aged 24)
Louis Meintjes (RSA)	21 February 1992 (aged 31)
Madis Mihkels (EST)	31 May 2003 (aged 20)
Hugo Page (FRA)	24 July 2001 (aged 22)
Tom Paquot (BEL)	22 September 1999 (aged 24)

Rider	Date of birth
Simone Petilli (ITA)	4 May 1993 (aged 30)
Adrien Petit (FRA)	26 September 1990 (aged 33)
Baptiste Planckaert (BEL)	28 September 1988 (aged 35)
Laurenz Rex (BEL)	15 December 1999 (aged 24)
Lorenzo Rota (ITA)	23 May 1995 (aged 28)
Dion Smith (NZL)	3 March 1993 (aged 30)
Rein Taaramäe (EST)	24 April 1987 (aged 36)
Mike Teunissen (NED)	25 August 1992 (aged 31)
Gerben Thijssen (BEL)	21 June 1998 (aged 25)
Taco van der Hoorn (NED)	4 December 1993 (aged 30)
Gijs Van Hoecke (BEL)	12 November 1991 (aged 32)
Boy van Poppel (NED)	18 January 1988 (aged 35)
Roel van Sintmaartensdijk (NED)	8 May 2001 (aged 22)
Georg Zimmermann (GER)	11 October 1997 (aged 26)

Riders who joined the team for the 2024 season

Rider	2023 team
Vito Braet	Team Flanders–Baloise
Francesco Busatto	neo-pro (Circus–ReUz–Technord)
Kevin Colleoni	Team Jayco–AlUla
Alexy Faure Prost	neo-pro (Circus–ReUz–Technord)
Gerben Kuypers	neo-pro (Circus–ReUz–Technord)
Gijs Van Hoecke	Human Powered Health
Roel van Sintmaartensdijk	neo-pro (Circus–ReUz–Technord)

Riders who left the team during or after the 2023 season

Rider	2024 team
Niccolò Bonifazio	Team Corratec–Vini Fantini
Sven Erik Bystrøm	Groupama–FDJ
Rui Costa	EF Education–EasyPost
Aimé De Gendt	Cofidis
Laurens Huys	Arkéa–B&B Hotels
Julius Johansen	Sabgal–Anicolor
Loïc Vliegen	Bingoal WB

== Season victories ==
Date	Race	Competition	Rider	Country	Location	Ref.
25 January	Surf Coast Classic	UCI Oceania Tour	Biniam Girmay (ERI)	Australia	Torquay	
28 January	Trofeo Palma	UCI Europe Tour	Gerben Thijssen (BEL)	Spain	Palma	
14 February	Volta ao Algarve, stage 1	UCI ProSeries	Gerben Thijssen (BEL)	Portugal	Lagos	
27 February	Le Samyn	UCI Europe Tour	Laurenz Rex (BEL)	Belgium	Dour	
4 April	Tour of the Basque Country, stage 4	UCI World Tour	Louis Meintjes (RSA)	Spain	Legutio	
29 May	Circuit Franco-Belge	UCI ProSeries	Biniam Girmay (ERI)	Belgium	Mont-de-l'Enclus	
5 June	ZLM Tour, stage 1 (ITT)	UCI Europe Tour	Rune Herregodts (BEL)	Netherlands	Westkapelle	
9 June	ZLM Tour, overall	UCI Europe Tour	Rune Herregodts (BEL)	Netherlands		
1 July	Tour de France, stage 3	UCI World Tour	Biniam Girmay (ERI)	France	Turin	
6 July	Tour de France, stage 8	UCI World Tour	Biniam Girmay (ERI)	France	Colombey-les-Deux-Eglises	
11 July	Tour de France, stage 12	UCI World Tour	Biniam Girmay (ERI)	France	Villeneuve-sur-Lot	
2 October	Elfstedenrace	UCI World Tour	Taco van der Hoorn (NED)	Netherlands	Leeuwarden	

== National, Continental, and World Champions ==
Date	Discipline	Jersey	Rider	Country	Location	Ref.
1 February	Estonian National Time Trial Championships		Rein Taaramäe (EST)	Estonia	Varbuse	
