= 2022 Okolo Slovenska =

2022 UCI Europe Tour

Race details
- Dates: 13 – 17 September 2021
- Stages: 4 + Prologue
- Distance: 729.5 km (453.3 mi)

Results
| Jersey awarded to the overall winner | Winner | Josef Černý (CZE) | (Quick-Step Alpha Vinyl Team) |
| | Second | Mauri Vansevenant (BEL) | (Quick-Step Alpha Vinyl Team) |
| | Third | Koen Bouwman (NED) | (Team Jumbo–Visma) |
| Jersey awarded to the points classification winner | Points | Jasper Haest (NED) | (VolkerWessels Cycling Team) |
| Jersey awarded to the mountains classification winner | Mountains | Lorenzo Fortunato (ITA) | (Eolo–Kometa) |
| Jersey awarded to the young rider classification winner | Young rider | Archie Ryan (IRL) | (Team Jumbo–Visma) |
| Jersey awarded to the combativity classification winner | Combativity | Jefferson Cepeda (ECU) | (Caja Rural–Seguros RGA) |
| | Team | Team Jumbo–Visma | |

The 2022 Okolo Slovenska (transl. Tour of Slovakia) is the 66th edition of the Okolo Slovenska road cycling stage race. It is being held between 13 and 17 September 2022, as a category 2.1 event on the 2022 UCI Europe Tour.

== Teams ==
Five of the nineteen UCI WorldTeams, six UCI ProTeams, nine UCI Continental teams, and the Slovak national team make up the twenty-one teams that are participating in the race.

UCI WorldTeams

- Astana Qazaqstan Team
- Quick-Step Alpha Vinyl Team
- Israel–Premier Tech
- Team Bahrain Victorious
- Team Jumbo–Visma

UCI ProTeams

- Bardiani–CSF–Faizanè
- Caja Rural–Seguros RGA
- Eolo–Kometa
- Equipo Kern Pharma
- Human Powered Health
- Team Novo Nordisk

UCI Continental Teams

- Adria Mobil
- ATT Investments
- Biesse–Carrera
- Dukla Banská Bystrica
- Elkov–Kasper
- Maloja Pushbikers
- HRE Mazowsze Serce Polski
- Santic–Wibatech
- VolkerWessels Cycling Team

National Teams

- Slovakia

== Route ==
Stage characteristics and winners
| Stage | Date | Route | Distance | Type | Winner |
|---|---|---|---|---|---|
| P | 13 September | Bratislava | 7.0 km (4.3 mi) | Individual time trial | Ethan Vernon (GBR) |
| 1 | 14 September | Šamorín to Trnava | 142.3 km (88.4 mi) | Flat stage | Ethan Vernon (GBR) |
| 2 | 15 September | Hlohovec to Banská Štiavnica | 186.3 km (115.8 mi) | Mountain stage | Archie Ryan (IRL) |
| 3 | 16 September | Detva to Spišská Nová Ves | 210.0 km (130.5 mi) | Hilly stage | Koen Bouwman (NED) |
| 4 | 17 September | Levoča to Košice | 182.1 km (113.2 mi) | Hilly stage | Jasper Haest (NED) |
| Total | | | 727.7 km (452.2 mi) | | |

== Stages ==
=== Prologue ===
13 September 2022 — Bratislava, 7.0 km (4.3 mi) (ITT)

Prologue Result
| Rank | Rider | Team | Time |
|---|---|---|---|
| 1 | Ethan Vernon (GBR) | Quick-Step Alpha Vinyl Team | 7' 33" |
| 2 | Josef Černý (CZE) | Quick-Step Alpha Vinyl Team | + 7" |
| 3 | Michael Mørkøv (DEN) | Quick-Step Alpha Vinyl Team | + 15" |
| 4 | Loe van Belle (NED) | Team Jumbo–Visma | + 15" |
| 5 | Jakub Otruba (CZE) | Elkov–Kasper | + 18" |
| 6 | Maikel Zijlaard (NED) | VolkerWessels Cycling Team | + 19" |
| 7 | Zdeněk Štybar (CZE) | Quick-Step Alpha Vinyl Team | + 20" |
| 8 | Stefan de Bod (RSA) | Astana Qazaqstan Team | + 21" |
| 9 | Martin Svrček (SVK) | Quick-Step Alpha Vinyl Team | + 22" |
| 10 | Liam Bertazzo (ITA) | Maloja Pushbikers | + 24" |

General classification after Prologue
| Rank | Rider | Team | Time |
|---|---|---|---|
| 1 | Ethan Vernon (GBR) | Quick-Step Alpha Vinyl Team | 7' 33" |
| 2 | Josef Černý (CZE) | Quick-Step Alpha Vinyl Team | + 7" |
| 3 | Michael Mørkøv (DEN) | Quick-Step Alpha Vinyl Team | + 15" |
| 4 | Loe van Belle (NED) | Team Jumbo–Visma | + 15" |
| 5 | Jakub Otruba (CZE) | Elkov–Kasper | + 18" |
| 6 | Maikel Zijlaard (NED) | VolkerWessels Cycling Team | + 19" |
| 7 | Zdeněk Štybar (CZE) | Quick-Step Alpha Vinyl Team | + 20" |
| 8 | Stefan de Bod (RSA) | Astana Qazaqstan Team | + 21" |
| 9 | Martin Svrček (SVK) | Quick-Step Alpha Vinyl Team | + 22" |
| 10 | Liam Bertazzo (ITA) | Maloja Pushbikers | + 24" |

=== Stage 1 ===
14 September 2022 — Bratislava to Trnava, 139.3 km (86.6 mi)

Stage 1 Result
| Rank | Rider | Team | Time |
|---|---|---|---|
| 1 | Ethan Vernon (GBR) | Quick-Step Alpha Vinyl Team | 3h 09' 02" |
| 2 | Gleb Syritsa | Astana Qazaqstan Team | + 7" |
| 3 | Giovanni Lonardi (ITA) | Eolo–Kometa | + 15" |
| 4 | Michael Mørkøv (DEN) | Quick-Step Alpha Vinyl Team | + 15" |
| 5 | Tomáš Bárta (CZE) | ATT Investments | + 18" |
| 6 | Colin Joyce (USA) | Human Powered Health | + 19" |
| 7 | Loe van Belle (NED) | Team Jumbo–Visma | + 20" |
| 8 | Daniel Skerl (ITA) | Cycling Team Friuli ASD | + 21" |
| 9 | Adam Toupalik (CZE) | Elkov–Kasper | + 22" |
| 10 | Filippo Fortin (ITA) | Maloja Pushbikers | + 24" |

General classification after Stage 1
| Rank | Rider | Team | Time |
|---|---|---|---|
| 1 | Ethan Vernon (GBR) | Quick-Step Alpha Vinyl Team | 3h 16' 25" |
| 2 | Josef Černý (CZE) | Quick-Step Alpha Vinyl Team | + 17" |
| 3 | Michael Mørkøv (DEN) | Quick-Step Alpha Vinyl Team | + 25" |
| 4 | Loe van Belle (NED) | Team Jumbo–Visma | + 25" |
| 5 | Jakub Otruba (CZE) | Elkov–Kasper | + 28" |
| 6 | Maikel Zijlaard (NED) | VolkerWessels Cycling Team | + 29" |
| 7 | Zdeněk Štybar (CZE) | Quick-Step Alpha Vinyl Team | + 30" |
| 8 | Gleb Syritsa | Astana Qazaqstan Team | + 30" |
| 9 | Stefan de Bod (RSA) | Astana Qazaqstan Team | + 31" |
| 10 | Martin Svrček (SVK) | Quick-Step Alpha Vinyl Team | + 32" |

=== Stage 2 ===
15 September 2022 — Hlohovec to Banská Štiavnica, 186.3 km (115.8 mi)

Stage 2 Result
| Rank | Rider | Team | Time |
|---|---|---|---|
| 1 | Archie Ryan (IRL) | Team Jumbo–Visma | 4h 32' 22" |
| 2 | Mauri Vansevenant (BEL) | Quick-Step Alpha Vinyl Team | + 0" |
| 3 | Lorenzo Fortunato (ITA) | Elkov–Kasper | + 0" |
| 4 | Stefan de Bod (RSA) | Astana Qazaqstan Team | + 3" |
| 5 | Bart Lemmen (NED) | VolkerWessels Cycling Team | + 4" |
| 6 | Jonathan Lastra (ESP) | Caja Rural–Seguros RGA | + 4" |
| 7 | Jakub Otruba (CZE) | Elkov–Kasper | + 4" |
| 8 | Davide De Cassan (ITA) | Cycling Team Friuli ASD | + 4" |
| 9 | Koen Bouwman (NED) | Team Jumbo–Visma | + 7" |
| 10 | Abel Balderstone (ESP) | Caja Rural–Seguros RGA | + 9" |

General classification after Stage 2
| Rank | Rider | Team | Time |
|---|---|---|---|
| 1 | Josef Černý (CZE) | Quick-Step Alpha Vinyl Team | 7h 49' 14" |
| 2 | Stefan de Bod (RSA) | Astana Qazaqstan Team | + 4" |
| 3 | Jakub Otruba (CZE) | Elkov–Kasper | + 5" |
| 4 | Mauri Vansevenant (BEL) | Quick-Step Alpha Vinyl Team | + 6" |
| 5 | Archie Ryan (IRL) | Team Jumbo–Visma | + 10" |
| 6 | Bart Lemmen (NED) | VolkerWessels Cycling Team | + 13" |
| 7 | Koen Bouwman (NED) | Team Jumbo–Visma | + 14" |
| 8 | Abel Balderstone (ESP) | Caja Rural–Seguros RGA | + 17" |
| 9 | Davide De Cassan (ITA) | Cycling Team Friuli ASD | + 25" |
| 10 | Jonathan Lastra (ESP) | Caja Rural–Seguros RGA | + 27" |

=== Stage 3 ===
16 September 2022 — Detva to Spišská Nová Ves, 214.8 km (133.5 mi)

Stage 3 Result
| Rank | Rider | Team | Time |
|---|---|---|---|
| 1 | Koen Bouwman (NED) | Team Jumbo–Visma | 5h 04' 07" |
| 2 | Luca Colnaghi (ITA) | Bardiani–CSF–Faizanè | + 0" |
| 3 | Roel van Sintmaartensdijk (NED) | VolkerWessels Cycling Team | + 0" |
| 4 | Josef Černý (CZE) | Quick-Step Alpha Vinyl Team | + 0" |
| 5 | Diego Pablo Sevilla (ESP) | Eolo–Kometa | + 0" |
| 6 | Davide Bais (ITA) | Eolo–Kometa | + 0" |
| 7 | Tomasz Budziński (POL) | HRE Mazowsze Serce Polski | + 0" |
| 8 | Jonathan Lastra (ESP) | Caja Rural–Seguros RGA | + 0" |
| 9 | Jiří Petruš (CZE) | ATT Investments | + 0" |
| 10 | Mauri Vansevenant (BEL) | Quick-Step Alpha Vinyl Team | + 0" |

General classification after Stage 3
| Rank | Rider | Team | Time |
|---|---|---|---|
| 1 | Josef Černý (CZE) | Quick-Step Alpha Vinyl Team | 12h 53' 21" |
| 2 | Mauri Vansevenant (BEL) | Quick-Step Alpha Vinyl Team | + 3" |
| 3 | Koen Bouwman (NED) | Team Jumbo–Visma | + 3" |
| 4 | Stefan de Bod (RSA) | Astana Qazaqstan Team | + 4" |
| 5 | Jakub Otruba (CZE) | Elkov–Kasper | + 4" |
| 6 | Archie Ryan (IRL) | Team Jumbo–Visma | + 10" |
| 7 | Bart Lemmen (NED) | VolkerWessels Cycling Team | + 12" |
| 8 | Abel Balderstone (ESP) | Caja Rural–Seguros RGA | + 17" |
| 9 | Jonathan Lastra (ESP) | Caja Rural–Seguros RGA | + 23" |
| 10 | Davide De Cassan (ITA) | Cycling Team Friuli ASD | + 24" |

=== Stage 4 ===
17 September 2022 — Levoča to Košice, 182.1 km (113.2 mi)

Stage 4 Result
| Rank | Rider | Team | Time |
|---|---|---|---|
| 1 | Jasper Haest (NED) | VolkerWessels Cycling Team | 3h 59' 41" |
| 2 | Peter Schulting (NED) | VolkerWessels Cycling Team | + 0" |
| 3 | Michael Mørkøv (DEN) | Quick-Step Alpha Vinyl Team | + 13" |
| 4 | Ethan Vernon (GBR) | Quick-Step Alpha Vinyl Team | + 13" |
| 5 | Gleb Syritsa | Astana Qazaqstan Team | + 13" |
| 6 | Filippo Fortin (ITA) | Maloja Pushbikers | + 13" |
| 7 | Giovanni Leonardi (ITA) | Eolo–Kometa | + 13" |
| 8 | Yuval Ben Moshe (ISR) | Israel–Premier Tech | + 13" |
| 9 | Daniel Babor (CZE) | Elkov–Kasper | + 13" |
| 10 | Daniel Skerl (ITA) | Cycling Team Friuli ASD | + 13" |

General classification after Stage 4
| Rank | Rider | Team | Time |
|---|---|---|---|
| 1 | Josef Černý (CZE) | Quick-Step Alpha Vinyl Team | 16h 53' 12" |
| 2 | Mauri Vansevenant (BEL) | Quick-Step Alpha Vinyl Team | + 6" |
| 3 | Koen Bouwman (NED) | Team Jumbo–Visma | + 6" |
| 4 | Stefan de Bod (RSA) | Astana Qazaqstan Team | + 7" |
| 5 | Jakub Otruba (CZE) | Elkov–Kasper | + 7" |
| 6 | Archie Ryan (IRL) | Team Jumbo–Visma | + 13" |
| 7 | Bart Lemmen (NED) | VolkerWessels Cycling Team | + 14" |
| 8 | Abel Balderstone (ESP) | Caja Rural–Seguros RGA | + 20" |
| 9 | Jonathan Lastra (ESP) | Caja Rural–Seguros RGA | + 26" |
| 10 | Davide De Cassan (ITA) | Cycling Team Friuli ASD | + 27" |

== Classification leadership table ==
Classification leadership by stage
| Stage | Winner | General classification | Points classification | Mountains classification | Young rider classification | Team classification |
|---|---|---|---|---|---|---|
| P | Ethan Vernon | Ethan Vernon | not awarded | not awarded | Ethan Vernon | Quick-Step Alpha Vinyl Team |
| 1 | Ethan Vernon | Ethan Vernon | Ethan Vernon | Matúš Štocek | Ethan Vernon | Quick-Step Alpha Vinyl Team |
| 2 | Archie Ryan | Josef Černý | Ethan Vernon | Lorenzo Fortunato | Archie Ryan | Team Jumbo–Visma |
| 3 | Koen Bouwman | Josef Černý | Ethan Vernon | Lorenzo Fortunato | Archie Ryan | Team Jumbo–Visma |
| 4 | Jasper Haest | Josef Černý | Jasper Haest | Lorenzo Fortunato | Archie Ryan | Team Jumbo–Visma |
| Final | | Josef Černý | Jasper Haest | Lorenzo Fortunato | Archie Ryan | Team Jumbo–Visma |
