= 2024 Volta ao Algarve =

Portuguese cycling race

2024 UCI ProSeries

Race details
- Dates: 14–18 February 2024
- Stages: 5
- Distance: 752.7 km (467.7 mi)
- Winning time: 18h 45' 53"

Results
Jersey awarded to the overall winner	Winner	Remco Evenepoel (BEL)	(Soudal–Quick-Step)
	Second	Daniel Martínez (COL)	(Bora–Hansgrohe)
	Third	Jan Tratnik (SLO)	(Visma–Lease a Bike)
Jersey awarded to the points classification winner	Points	Gerben Thijssen (BEL)	(Intermarché–Wanty)
Jersey awarded to the mountains classification winner	Mountains	Daniel Martínez (COL)	(Bora–Hansgrohe)
Jersey awarded to the youth classification winner	Youth	António Morgado (POR)	(UAE Team Emirates)
	Team	(Netherlands) Visma–Lease a Bike	

The 2024 Volta ao Algarve (English: Tour of the Algarve) was a road cycling stage race that took between 14 and 18 February 2024 in the Algarve region of southern Portugal. The race was rated as a category 2.Pro event on the 2024 UCI ProSeries calendar, and was the 50th edition of the Volta ao Algarve.

== Teams ==
13 of the 18 UCI WorldTeams, three UCI ProTeams, and nine UCI Continental teams made up the 25 teams that participated in the race.

UCI WorldTeams

- Alpecin–Deceuninck
- Arkéa–B&B Hotels
- Astana Qazaqstan Team
- Bora–Hansgrohe
- EF Education–EasyPost
- Groupama–FDJ
- Ineos Grenadiers
- Intermarché–Wanty
- Lidl–Trek
- Soudal–Quick-Step
- Team dsm–firmenich PostNL
- Visma–Lease a Bike
- UAE Team Emirates

UCI ProTeams

- Caja Rural–Seguros RGA
- Tudor Pro Cycling Team
- Uno-X Mobility

UCI Continental Teams

- ABTF Betão–Feirense
- AP Hotels & Resorts / Tavira / SC Farense
- Aviludo–Louletano–Loulé Concelho
- Credibom / LA Alumínios / Marcos Car
- Efapel Cycling
- GI Group Holding–Simoldes–UDO
- Rádio Popular–Paredes–Boavista
- Sabgal–Anicolor
- Tavfer–Ovos Matinados–Mortágua

== Route ==
Stage characteristics and winners
Stage	Date	Course	Distance	Type	Stage winner
1	14 February	Portimão to Lagos	200.8 km (124.8 mi)	Flat stage	Gerben Thijssen (BEL)
2	15 February	Lagoa to Alto da Fóia	171.9 km (106.8 mi)	Mountain stage	Daniel Martínez (COL)
3	16 February	Vila Real de Santo António to Tavira	192.2 km (119.4 mi)	Flat stage	Wout van Aert (BEL)
4	17 February	Albufeira to Albufeira	22 km (14 mi)	Individual time trial	Remco Evenepoel (BEL)
5	18 February	Faro to Alto do Malhão	165.8 km (103.0 mi)	Hilly stage	Daniel Martínez (COL)
Total			752.7 km (467.7 mi)		

== Stages ==
=== Stage 1 ===
14 February 2024 – Portimão to Lagos, 200.8 km (124.8 mi)

Stage 1 Result (1–10)
Rank	Rider	Team	Time
1	Gerben Thijssen (BEL)	Intermarché–Wanty	4h 52' 04"
2	Marijn van den Berg (NED)	EF Education–EasyPost	+ 0"
3	Jordi Meeus (BEL)	Bora–Hansgrohe	+ 0"
4	Lars Boven (NED)	Alpecin–Deceuninck	+ 0"
5	Arnaud Démare (FRA)	Arkéa–B&B Hotels	+ 0"
6	Rui Oliveira (POR)	UAE Team Emirates	+ 0"
7	Jasper Stuyven (BEL)	Lidl–Trek	+ 0"
8	Kim Heiduk (GER)	Ineos Grenadiers	+ 0"
9	Luís Mendonça (POR)	Sabgal–Anicolor	+ 0"
10	Casper van Uden (NED)	Team dsm–firmenich PostNL	+ 0"

General classification after Stage 1 (1–10)
Rank	Rider	Team	Time
1	Gerben Thijssen (BEL)	Intermarché–Wanty	4h 51' 54"
2	Marijn van den Berg (NED)	EF Education–EasyPost	+ 4"
3	Tobias Bayer (AUT)	Alpecin–Deceuninck	+ 4"
4	Jordi Meeus (BEL)	Bora–Hansgrohe	+ 6"
5	Tomás Contte (ARG)	Aviludo–Louletano–Loulé Concelho	+ 8"
6	Lars Boven (NED)	Alpecin–Deceuninck	+ 10"
7	Arnaud Démare (FRA)	Arkéa–B&B Hotels	+ 10"
8	Rui Oliveira (POR)	UAE Team Emirates	+ 10"
9	Jasper Stuyven (BEL)	Lidl–Trek	+ 10"
10	Kim Heiduk (GER)	Ineos Grenadiers	+ 10"

=== Stage 2 ===
15 February 2024 – Lagoa to Alto da Fóia, 171.9 km (106.8 mi)

Stage 2 Result (1–10)
Rank	Rider	Team	Time
1	Daniel Martínez (COL)	Bora–Hansgrohe	4h 40' 20"
2	Remco Evenepoel (BEL)	Soudal–Quick-Step	+ 0"
3	Sepp Kuss (USA)	Visma–Lease a Bike	+ 6"
4	Sergio Higuita (COL)	Bora–Hansgrohe	+ 6"
5	Jan Tratnik (SLO)	Visma–Lease a Bike	+ 8"
6	Tom Pidcock (GBR)	Ineos Grenadiers	+ 8"
7	Tao Geoghegan Hart (GBR)	Lidl–Trek	+ 8"
8	Thymen Arensman (NED)	Ineos Grenadiers	+ 13"
9	Mikel Landa (ESP)	Soudal–Quick-Step	+ 13"
10	Christian Scaroni (ITA)	Astana Qazaqstan Team	+ 18"

General classification after Stage 2 (1–10)
Rank	Rider	Team	Time
1	Daniel Martínez (COL)	Bora–Hansgrohe	9h 32' 14"
2	Remco Evenepoel (BEL)	Soudal–Quick-Step	+ 4"
3	Sepp Kuss (USA)	Visma–Lease a Bike	+ 12"
4	Sergio Higuita (COL)	Bora–Hansgrohe	+ 16"
5	Jan Tratnik (SLO)	Visma–Lease a Bike	+ 18"
6	Tao Geoghegan Hart (GBR)	Lidl–Trek	+ 18"
7	Tom Pidcock (GBR)	Ineos Grenadiers	+ 18"
8	Thymen Arensman (NED)	Ineos Grenadiers	+ 23"
9	Mikel Landa (ESP)	Soudal–Quick-Step	+ 23"
10	Christian Scaroni (ITA)	Astana Qazaqstan Team	+ 28"

=== Stage 3 ===
16 February 2024 – Vila Real de Santo António to Tavira, 192.2 km (119.4 mi)

Stage 3 Result (1–10)
Rank	Rider	Team	Time
1	Wout van Aert (BEL)	Visma–Lease a Bike	4h 50' 57"
2	Rui Oliveira (POR)	UAE Team Emirates	+ 0"
3	Marius Mayrhofer (GER)	Tudor Pro Cycling Team	+ 0"
4	Gerben Thijssen (BEL)	Intermarché–Wanty	+ 0"
5	Stefan Bissegger (SUI)	EF Education–EasyPost	+ 0"
6	Rasmus Tiller (NOR)	Uno-X Mobility	+ 0"
7	Jasper Stuyven (BEL)	Lidl–Trek	+ 0"
8	Magnus Cort (DEN)	Uno-X Mobility	+ 0"
9	Yevgeniy Fedorov (KAZ)	Astana Qazaqstan Team	+ 0"
10	Santiago Mesa (COL)	Efapel Cycling	+ 0"

General classification after Stage 3 (1–10)
Rank	Rider	Team	Time
1	Daniel Martínez (COL)	Bora–Hansgrohe	14h 23' 11"
2	Remco Evenepoel (BEL)	Soudal–Quick-Step	+ 4"
3	Sepp Kuss (USA)	Visma–Lease a Bike	+ 12"
4	Sergio Higuita (COL)	Bora–Hansgrohe	+ 16"
5	Jan Tratnik (SLO)	Visma–Lease a Bike	+ 18"
6	Tom Pidcock (GBR)	Ineos Grenadiers	+ 18"
7	Tao Geoghegan Hart (GBR)	Lidl–Trek	+ 18"
8	Wout van Aert (BEL)	Visma–Lease a Bike	+ 22"
9	Thymen Arensman (NED)	Ineos Grenadiers	+ 23"
10	Mikel Landa (ESP)	Soudal–Quick-Step	+ 23"

=== Stage 4 ===
17 February 2024 – Albufeira to Albufeira, 22 km (14 mi) (ITT)

Stage 4 Result (1–10)
Rank	Rider	Team	Time
1	Remco Evenepoel (BEL)	Soudal–Quick-Step	27' 09"
2	Magnus Sheffield (USA)	Ineos Grenadiers	+ 16"
3	Stefan Küng (SUI)	Groupama–FDJ	+ 29"
4	Isaac del Toro (MEX)	UAE Team Emirates	+ 37"
5	Mattia Cattaneo (ITA)	Soudal–Quick-Step	+ 46"
6	Filippo Ganna (ITA)	Ineos Grenadiers	+ 47"
7	Ben Healy (IRL)	EF Education–EasyPost	+ 48"
8	Daniel Martínez (COL)	Bora–Hansgrohe	+ 51"
9	Rune Herregodts (BEL)	Intermarché–Wanty	+ 58"
10	Jan Tratnik (SLO)	Visma–Lease a Bike	+ 58"

General classification after Stage 4 (1–10)
Rank	Rider	Team	Time
1	Remco Evenepoel (BEL)	Soudal–Quick-Step	14h 50' 24"
2	Daniel Martínez (COL)	Bora–Hansgrohe	+ 47"
3	Jan Tratnik (SLO)	Visma–Lease a Bike	+ 1' 12"
4	Wout van Aert (BEL)	Visma–Lease a Bike	+ 1' 18"
5	Stefan Küng (SUI)	Groupama–FDJ	+ 1' 18"
6	Ben Healy (IRL)	EF Education–EasyPost	+ 1' 20"
7	Thymen Arensman (NED)	Ineos Grenadiers	+ 1' 23"
8	Magnus Sheffield (USA)	Ineos Grenadiers	+ 1' 34"
9	António Morgado (POR)	UAE Team Emirates	+ 1' 39"
10	Tom Pidcock (GBR)	Ineos Grenadiers	+ 1' 44"

=== Stage 5 ===
18 February 2024 – Faro to Alto do Malhão, 165.8 km (103.0 mi)

Stage 5 Result (1–10)
Rank	Rider	Team	Time
1	Daniel Martínez (COL)	Bora–Hansgrohe	3h 55' 35"
2	Remco Evenepoel (BEL)	Soudal–Quick-Step	+ 0"
3	Tom Pidcock (GBR)	Ineos Grenadiers	+ 3"
4	Cristian Scaroni (ITA)	Astana Qazaqstan Team	+ 7"
5	Jan Tratnik (SLO)	Visma–Lease a Bike	+ 7"
6	Sepp Kuss (USA)	Visma–Lease a Bike	+ 7"
7	Tao Geoghegan Hart (GBR)	Lidl–Trek	+ 16"
8	Ben Healy (IRL)	EF Education–EasyPost	+ 16"
9	Thymen Arensman (NED)	Ineos Grenadiers	+ 16"
10	António Morgado (POR)	UAE Team Emirates	+ 24"

General classification after Stage 5 (1–10)
Rank	Rider	Team	Time
1	Remco Evenepoel (BEL)	Soudal–Quick-Step	18h 45' 53"
2	Daniel Martínez (COL)	Bora–Hansgrohe	+ 43"
3	Jan Tratnik (SLO)	Visma–Lease a Bike	+ 1' 21"
4	Ben Healy (IRL)	EF Education–EasyPost	+ 1' 42"
5	Thymen Arensman (NED)	Ineos Grenadiers	+ 1' 45"
6	Tom Pidcock (GBR)	Ineos Grenadiers	+ 1' 49"
7	Wout van Aert (BEL)	Visma–Lease a Bike	+ 1' 57"
8	Sepp Kuss (USA)	Visma–Lease a Bike	+ 1' 59"
9	Stefan Küng (SUI)	Groupama–FDJ	+ 2' 06"
10	António Morgado (POR)	UAE Team Emirates	+ 2' 09"

== Classification leadership table ==
Classification leadership by stage
Stage	Winner	General classification	Points classification	Mountains classification	Young rider classification	Team classification
1	Gerben Thijssen	Gerben Thijssen	Gerben Thijssen	Tomás Contte	Magnus Sheffield	Ineos Grenadiers
2	Daniel Martínez	Daniel Martínez	Gerben Thijssen	Daniel Martínez	António Morgado	Bora–Hansgrohe
3	Wout van Aert	Daniel Martínez	Gerben Thijssen	Daniel Martínez	António Morgado	Bora–Hansgrohe
4	Remco Evenepoel	Remco Evenepoel	Gerben Thijssen	Daniel Martínez	Magnus Sheffield	Ineos Grenadiers
5	Daniel Martínez	Remco Evenepoel	Gerben Thijssen	Daniel Martínez	António Morgado	Visma–Lease a Bike
Final		Remco Evenepoel	Gerben Thijssen	Daniel Martínez	António Morgado	Visma–Lease a Bike

== Classification standings ==
Legend
Denotes the leader of the general classification	Denotes the leader of the mountains classification
Denotes the leader of the points classification	Denotes the leader of the young rider classification

=== General classification ===
Final general classification (1–10)
Rank	Rider	Team	Time
1	Remco Evenepoel (BEL)	Soudal–Quick-Step	18h 45' 53"
2	Daniel Martínez (COL)	Bora–Hansgrohe	+ 43"
3	Jan Tratnik (SLO)	Visma–Lease a Bike	+ 1' 21"
4	Ben Healy (IRL)	EF Education–EasyPost	+ 1' 42"
5	Thymen Arensman (NED)	Ineos Grenadiers	+ 1' 45"
6	Tom Pidcock (GBR)	Ineos Grenadiers	+ 1' 49"
7	Wout van Aert (BEL)	Visma–Lease a Bike	+ 1' 57"
8	Sepp Kuss (USA)	Visma–Lease a Bike	+ 1' 59"
9	Stefan Küng (SUI)	Groupama–FDJ	+ 2' 06"
10	António Morgado (POR)	UAE Team Emirates	+ 2' 09"

=== Points classification ===
Final points classification (1–10)
Rank	Rider	Team	Points
1	Gerben Thijssen (BEL)	Intermarché–Wanty	44
2	Daniel Martínez (COL)	Bora–Hansgrohe	30
3	Wout van Aert (BEL)	Visma–Lease a Bike	29
4	Rui Oliveira (POR)	UAE Team Emirates	28
5	Remco Evenepoel (BEL)	Soudal–Quick-Step	24
6	Jan Tratnik (SLO)	Visma–Lease a Bike	16
7	Marius Mayrhofer (GER)	Tudor Pro Cycling Team	16
8	Jordi Meeus (BEL)	Bora–Hansgrohe	16
9	Tom Pidcock (GBR)	Ineos Grenadiers	15
10	Sepp Kuss (USA)	Visma–Lease a Bike	15

=== Mountains classification ===
Final mountains classification (1–10)
Rank	Rider	Team	Points
1	Daniel Martínez (COL)	Bora–Hansgrohe	16
2	Andreas Leknessund (NOR)	Uno-X Mobility	13
3	Sepp Kuss (USA)	Visma–Lease a Bike	9
4	Remco Evenepoel (BEL)	Soudal–Quick-Step	8
5	German Tivani (ARG)	Aviludo–Louletano–Loulé Concelho	8
6	Wout van Aert (BEL)	Visma–Lease a Bike	8
7	Tomás Contte (ARG)	Aviludo–Louletano–Loulé Concelho	7
8	Ben Healy (IRL)	EF Education–EasyPost	6
9	Martin Urianstad (NOR)	Uno-X Mobility	6
10	Max Walker (GBR)	Astana Qazaqstan Team	6

=== Young rider classification ===
Final young rider classification (1–10)
Rank	Rider	Team	Time
1	António Morgado (POR)	UAE Team Emirates	18h 48' 02"
2	Magnus Sheffield (USA)	Ineos Grenadiers	+ 3' 32"
3	Jan Christen (SUI)	UAE Team Emirates	+ 4' 43"
4	Per Strand Hagenes (NOR)	Visma–Lease a Bike	+ 10' 39"
5	Jaume Guardeño (ESP)	Caja Rural–Seguros RGA	+ 13' 18"
6	Enzo Paleni (FRA)	Groupama–FDJ	+ 21' 31"
7	Mathias Vacek (CZE)	Lidl–Trek	+ 27' 01"
8	Pavel Bittner (CZE)	Team dsm–firmenich PostNL	+ 28' 12"
9	Alexandre Montez (POR)	Credibom / LA Alumínios / Marcos Car	+ 31' 36"
10	Duarte Domingues (POR)	Sabgal–Anicolor	+ 44' 20"

=== Team classification ===
Final team classification (1–10)
Rank	Team	Time
1	(Netherlands) Visma–Lease a Bike	56h 22' 59"
2	(Germany) Bora–Hansgrohe	+ 1' 28"
3	(United Kingdom) Ineos Grenadiers	+ 3' 16"
4	(Belgium) Soudal–Quick-Step	+ 9' 23"
5	(United Arab Emirates) UAE Team Emirates	+ 9' 27"
6	(United States) EF Education–EasyPost	+ 9' 53"
7	(United States) Lidl–Trek	+ 14' 26"
8	(Kazakhstan) Astana Qazaqstan Team	+ 15' 14"
9	(Norway) Uno-X Mobility	+ 21' 42"
10	(France) Groupama–FDJ	+ 22' 22"
