= 2024 ZLM Tour =

2024 UCI Europe Tour

Race details
- Dates: 5–9 June
- Stages: 5
- Distance: 744 km (462 mi)
- Winning time: 15h 58' 50"

Results
Jersey awarded to the overall winner	Winner	Rune Herregodts (BEL)	(Intermarché–Wanty)
	Second	Max Walker (GBR)	(Astana Qazaqstan Team)
	Third	Tom Bohli (SUI)	(Tudor Pro Cycling Team)
Jersey awarded to the points classification winner	Points	Casper van Uden (NED)	(Team dsm–firmenich PostNL)
Jersey awarded to the young rider classification winner	Young rider	Wessel Mouris (NED)	(Metec–Solarwatt p/b Mantel)
	Team	(Belgium) Intermarché–Wanty	

The 2024 ZLM Tour is the 35th edition of the ZLM Tour cycling stage race. It started on 5 June in Westkapelle and ended on 9 June in Oosterhout and is part of the 2024 UCI Europe Tour.

== Teams ==
Five UCI WorldTeams, six UCI ProTeams and eight UCI Continental teams made up the nineteen teams that participated in the race.

UCI WorldTeams

- Alpecin–Deceuninck
- Astana Qazaqstan Team
- Intermarché–Wanty
- Team dsm–firmenich PostNL
- Visma–Lease a Bike

UCI ProTeams

- Bingoal WB
- Team Corratec–Vini Fantini
- Polti–Kometa
- Team Flanders–Baloise
- Tudor Pro Cycling Team
- VF Group–Bardiani–CSF–Faizanè

UCI Continental Teams

- ARA Skip Capital
- Arkéa–B&B Hôtels Continentale
- BEAT Cycling Club
- Diftar Continental Cyclingteam
- Metec–Solarwatt p/b Mantel
- Parkhotel Valkenburg
- Team Storck–Metropol Cycling
- VolkerWessels Cycling Team

== Route ==
Stage characteristics and winners
Stage	Date	Course	Distance	Type	Stage winner
1	5 June	Westkapelle to Westkapelle	14.7 km (9.1 mi)	Individual time trial	Rune Herregodts (BEL)
2	6 June	Middelburg to Wissenkerke	193.8 km (120.4 mi)	Flat stage	Casper van Uden (NED)
3	7 June	Schijndel to Buchten	179.4 km (111.5 mi)	Flat stage	Peter Schulting (NED)
4	8 June	Roosendaal to Roosendaal	196.7 km (122.2 mi)	Flat stage	Casper van Uden (NED)
5	9 June	Oosterhout to Oosterhout	159.4 km (99.0 mi)	Flat stage	Alexander Salby (DEN)
Total		744 km (462.3 mi)			

== Stages ==
=== Stage 1 ===
5 June 2024 – Westkapelle to Westkapelle, 14.7 km (9.1 mi) (ITT)

Stage 1 Result
Rank	Rider	Team	Time
1	Rune Herregodts (BEL)	Intermarché–Wanty	17' 16"
2	Tim van Dijke (NED)	Visma–Lease a Bike	+ 12"
3	Gleb Syritsa	Astana Qazaqstan Team	+ 18"
4	Max Walker (GBR)	Astana Qazaqstan Team	+ 20"
5	Arthur Kluckers (LUX)	Tudor Pro Cycling Team	+ 25"
6	Tom Bohli (SUI)	Tudor Pro Cycling Team	+ 25"
7	Roel van Sintmaartensdijk (NED)	Intermarché–Wanty	+ 31"
8	Axel van der Tuuk (NED)	Metec–Solarwatt p/b Mantel	+ 32"
9	Wessel Mouris (NED)	Metec–Solarwatt p/b Mantel	+ 38"
10	Patrick Eddy (AUS)	Team dsm–firmenich PostNL	+ 38"

General classification after Stage 1
Rank	Rider	Team	Time
1	Rune Herregodts (BEL)	Intermarché–Wanty	17' 16"
2	Tim van Dijke (NED)	Visma–Lease a Bike	+ 12"
3	Gleb Syritsa	Astana Qazaqstan Team	+ 18"
4	Max Walker (GBR)	Astana Qazaqstan Team	+ 20"
5	Arthur Kluckers (LUX)	Tudor Pro Cycling Team	+ 25"
6	Tom Bohli (SUI)	Tudor Pro Cycling Team	+ 25"
7	Roel van Sintmaartensdijk (NED)	Intermarché–Wanty	+ 31"
8	Axel van der Tuuk (NED)	Metec–Solarwatt p/b Mantel	+ 32"
9	Wessel Mouris (NED)	Metec–Solarwatt p/b Mantel	+ 38"
10	Patrick Eddy (AUS)	Team dsm–firmenich PostNL	+ 38"

=== Stage 2 ===
6 June 2024 – Middelburg to Wissenkerke, 193.8 km (120.4 mi)

Stage 2 Result
Rank	Rider	Team	Time
1	Casper van Uden (NED)	Team dsm–firmenich PostNL	4h 18' 04"
2	Gleb Syritsa	Astana Qazaqstan Team	+ 0"
3	Gerben Thijssen (BEL)	Intermarché–Wanty	+ 0"
4	Giovanni Lonardi (ITA)	Polti–Kometa	+ 0"
5	Mattia Pinazzi (ITA)	VF Group–Bardiani–CSF–Faizanè	+ 0"
6	Tom Bohli (SUI)	Tudor Pro Cycling Team	+ 0"
7	Timo de Jong (NED)	VolkerWessels Cycling Team	+ 0"
8	Jakub Mareczko (ITA)	Team Corratec–Vini Fantini	+ 0"
9	Colby Simmons (USA)	Visma–Lease a Bike	+ 0"
10	Mārtiņš Pluto (LAT)	BEAT Cycling Club	+ 0"

General classification after Stage 2
Rank	Rider	Team	Time
1	Rune Herregodts (BEL)	Intermarché–Wanty	4h 35' 20"
2	Tim van Dijke (NED)	Visma–Lease a Bike	+ 12"
3	Gleb Syritsa	Astana Qazaqstan Team	+ 12"
4	Max Walker (GBR)	Astana Qazaqstan Team	+ 20"
5	Arthur Kluckers (LUX)	Tudor Pro Cycling Team	+ 25"
6	Tom Bohli (SUI)	Tudor Pro Cycling Team	+ 25"
7	Roel van Sintmaartensdijk (NED)	Intermarché–Wanty	+ 31"
8	Axel van der Tuuk (NED)	Metec–Solarwatt p/b Mantel	+ 32"
9	Wessel Mouris (NED)	Metec–Solarwatt p/b Mantel	+ 38"
10	Patrick Eddy (AUS)	Team dsm–firmenich PostNL	+ 38"

=== Stage 3 ===
7 June 2024 – Schijndel to Buchten, 179.4 km (111.5 mi)

Stage 3 Result
Rank	Rider	Team	Time
1	Peter Schulting (NED)	Diftar Continental Cyclingteam	3h 54' 26"
2	Martijn Rasenberg (NED)	Parkhotel Valkenburg	+ 0"
3	Wessel Mouris (NED)	Metec–Solarwatt p/b Mantel	+ 0"
4	Casper van Uden (NED)	Team dsm–firmenich PostNL	+ 0"
5	Simon Dehairs (BEL)	Alpecin–Deceuninck	+ 0"
6	Mike Teunissen (NED)	Intermarché–Wanty	+ 0"
7	Giovanni Lonardi (ITA)	Polti–Kometa	+ 0"
8	Jakub Mareczko (ITA)	Team Corratec–Vini Fantini	+ 0"
9	Loe van Belle (NED)	Visma–Lease a Bike	+ 0"
10	Mika Heming (GER)	Tudor Pro Cycling Team	+ 0"

General classification after Stage 3
Rank	Rider	Team	Time
1	Rune Herregodts (BEL)	Intermarché–Wanty	8h 29' 46"
2	Max Walker (GBR)	Astana Qazaqstan Team	+ 20"
3	Tom Bohli (SUI)	Tudor Pro Cycling Team	+ 25"
4	Roel van Sintmaartensdijk (NED)	Intermarché–Wanty	+ 31"
5	Wessel Mouris (NED)	Metec–Solarwatt p/b Mantel	+ 32"
6	Arthur Kluckers (LUX)	Tudor Pro Cycling Team	+ 33"
7	Gleb Syritsa	Astana Qazaqstan Team	+ 39"
8	Axel van der Tuuk (NED)	Metec–Solarwatt p/b Mantel	+ 40"
9	Mirco Maestri (ITA)	Polti–Kometa	+ 41"
10	Petr Kelemen (CZE)	Tudor Pro Cycling Team	+ 43"

=== Stage 4 ===
8 June 2024 – Roosendaal to Roosendaal, 196.7 km (122.2 mi)

Stage 4 Result
Rank	Rider	Team	Time
1	Casper van Uden (NED)	Team dsm–firmenich PostNL	4h 14' 26"
2	Simon Dehairs (BEL)	Alpecin–Deceuninck	+ 0"
3	Giovanni Lonardi (ITA)	Polti–Kometa	+ 0"
4	Gleb Syritsa	Astana Qazaqstan Team	+ 0"
5	Gerben Thijssen (BEL)	Intermarché–Wanty	+ 0"
6	Luca Colnaghi (ITA)	VF Group–Bardiani–CSF–Faizanè	+ 0"
7	David Dekker (NED)	Arkéa–B&B Hôtels Continentale	+ 0"
8	Enrico Zanoncello (ITA)	VF Group–Bardiani–CSF–Faizanè	+ 0"
9	Alexander Salby (DEN)	Bingoal WB	+ 0"
10	Loe van Belle (NED)	Visma–Lease a Bike	+ 0"

General classification after Stage 4
Rank	Rider	Team	Time
1	Rune Herregodts (BEL)	Intermarché–Wanty	12h 44' 12"
2	Max Walker (GBR)	Astana Qazaqstan Team	+ 20"
3	Tom Bohli (SUI)	Tudor Pro Cycling Team	+ 25"
4	Roel van Sintmaartensdijk (NED)	Intermarché–Wanty	+ 31"
5	Wessel Mouris (NED)	Metec–Solarwatt p/b Mantel	+ 32"
6	Arthur Kluckers (LUX)	Tudor Pro Cycling Team	+ 33"
7	Gleb Syritsa	Astana Qazaqstan Team	+ 39"
8	Axel van der Tuuk (NED)	Metec–Solarwatt p/b Mantel	+ 40"
9	Casper van Uden (NED)	Team dsm–firmenich PostNL	+ 41"
10	Mirco Maestri (ITA)	Polti–Kometa	+ 41"

=== Stage 5 ===
9 June 2024 – Oosterhout to Oosterhout, 159.4 km (99.0 mi)

Stage 5 Result
Rank	Rider	Team	Time
1	Alexander Salby (DEN)	Bingoal WB	3h 14' 38"
2	Gleb Syritsa	Astana Qazaqstan Team	+ 0"
3	Jakub Mareczko (ITA)	Team Corratec–Vini Fantini	+ 0"
4	Casper van Uden (NED)	Team dsm–firmenich PostNL	+ 0"
5	Giovanni Lonardi (ITA)	Polti–Kometa	+ 0"
6	Enrico Zanoncello (ITA)	VF Group–Bardiani–CSF–Faizanè	+ 0"
7	Giosuè Epis (ITA)	Arkéa–B&B Hôtels Continentale	+ 0"
8	Jan-Willem van Schip (NED)	Parkhotel Valkenburg	+ 0"
9	Gerben Thijssen (BEL)	Intermarché–Wanty	+ 0"
10	Lars Hohmann (NED)	Parkhotel Valkenburg	+ 0"

General classification after Stage 5
Rank	Rider	Team	Time
1	Rune Herregodts (BEL)	Intermarché–Wanty	15h 58' 50"
2	Max Walker (GBR)	Astana Qazaqstan Team	+ 20"
3	Tom Bohli (SUI)	Tudor Pro Cycling Team	+ 23"
4	Roel van Sintmaartensdijk (NED)	Intermarché–Wanty	+ 31"
5	Wessel Mouris (NED)	Metec–Solarwatt p/b Mantel	+ 32"
6	Gleb Syritsa	Astana Qazaqstan Team	+ 33"
7	Arthur Kluckers (LUX)	Tudor Pro Cycling Team	+ 33"
8	Mike Teunissen (NED)	Intermarché–Wanty	+ 39"
9	Axel van der Tuuk (NED)	Metec–Solarwatt p/b Mantel	+ 40"
10	Casper van Uden (NED)	Team dsm–firmenich PostNL	+ 41"

== Classification leadership table ==
Stage	Winner	General classification	Points classification	Young rider classification	Teams classification
1	Rune Herregodts	Rune Herregodts	not awarded	Wessel Mouris	Intermarché–Wanty
2	Casper van Uden	Rune Herregodts	Casper van Uden	Wessel Mouris	Intermarché–Wanty
3	Peter Schulting	Rune Herregodts	Casper van Uden	Wessel Mouris	Intermarché–Wanty
4	Casper van Uden	Rune Herregodts	Casper van Uden	Wessel Mouris	Intermarché–Wanty
5	Alexander Salby	Rune Herregodts	Casper van Uden	Wessel Mouris	Intermarché–Wanty
Final		Rune Herregodts	Casper van Uden	Wessel Mouris	Intermarché–Wanty

== Classification standings ==
Legend
Denotes the winner of the general classification
Denotes the winner of the points classification
Denotes the winner of the young rider classification

=== General classification ===
Final general classification (1–10)
Rank	Rider	Team	Time
1	Rune Herregodts (BEL)	Intermarché–Wanty	15h 58' 50"
2	Max Walker (GBR)	Astana Qazaqstan Team	+ 20"
3	Tom Bohli (SUI)	Tudor Pro Cycling Team	+ 23"
4	Roel van Sintmaartensdijk (NED)	Intermarché–Wanty	+ 31"
5	Wessel Mouris (NED)	Metec–Solarwatt p/b Mantel	+ 32"
6	Gleb Syritsa	Astana Qazaqstan Team	+ 33"
7	Arthur Kluckers (LUX)	Tudor Pro Cycling Team	+ 33"
8	Mike Teunissen (NED)	Intermarché–Wanty	+ 39"
9	Axel van der Tuuk (NED)	Metec–Solarwatt p/b Mantel	+ 40"
10	Casper van Uden (NED)	Team dsm–firmenich PostNL	+ 41"

=== Points classification ===
Final points classification (1–10)
Rank	Rider	Team	Points
1	Casper van Uden (NED)	Team dsm–firmenich PostNL	46
2	Gleb Syritsa	Astana Qazaqstan Team	32
3	Giovanni Lonardi (ITA)	Polti–Kometa	28
4	Gerben Thijssen (BEL)	Intermarché–Wanty	18
5	Simon Dehairs (BEL)	Alpecin–Deceuninck	18
6	Peter Schulting (NED)	Diftar Continental Cyclingteam	18
7	Alexander Salby (DEN)	Bingoal WB	17
8	Jakub Mareczko (ITA)	Team Corratec–Vini Fantini	16
9	Martijn Rasenberg (NED)	Parkhotel Valkenburg	15
10	Mike Teunissen (NED)	Intermarché–Wanty	15

=== Young rider classification ===
Final young rider classification (1–10)
Rank	Rider	Team	Time
1	Wessel Mouris (NED)	Metec–Solarwatt p/b Mantel	15h 59' 22"
2	Nicolas Milesi (ITA)	Arkéa–B&B Hôtels Continentale	+ 18"
3	Michiel Lambrecht (BEL)	Bingoal WB	+ 41"
4	Dylan Vandenstorme (BEL)	Team Flanders–Baloise	+ 52"
5	Colby Simmons (USA)	Visma–Lease a Bike	+ 55"
6	Patrick Eddy (AUS)	Team dsm–firmenich PostNL	+ 59"
7	Morten Aalling Nørtoft (DEN)	Visma–Lease a Bike	+ 1' 14"
8	Giosuè Epis (ITA)	Arkéa–B&B Hôtels Continentale	+ 1' 24"
9	Alessio Delle Vedove (ITA)	Intermarché–Wanty	+ 1' 30"
10	Baptiste Gillet (FRA)	Arkéa–B&B Hôtels Continentale	+ 1' 35"

=== Team classification ===
Final team classification (1–10)
Rank	Team	Time
1	(Belgium) Intermarché–Wanty	47h 57' 46"
2	(Switzerland) Tudor Pro Cycling Team	+ 17"
3	(Netherlands) Visma–Lease a Bike	+ 44"
4	(France) Arkéa–B&B Hôtels Continentale	+ 1' 12"
5	(Kazakhstan) Astana Qazaqstan Team	+ 1' 34"
6	(Belgium) Alpecin–Deceuninck	+ 1' 48"
7	(Netherlands) Parkhotel Valkenburg	+ 2' 38"
8	(Italy) Polti–Kometa	+ 2' 54"
9	(Italy) VF Group–Bardiani–CSF–Faizanè	+ 3' 07"
10	(Netherlands) VolkerWessels Cycling Team	+ 4' 38"
