= Coen Vermeltfoort =

Dutch cyclist

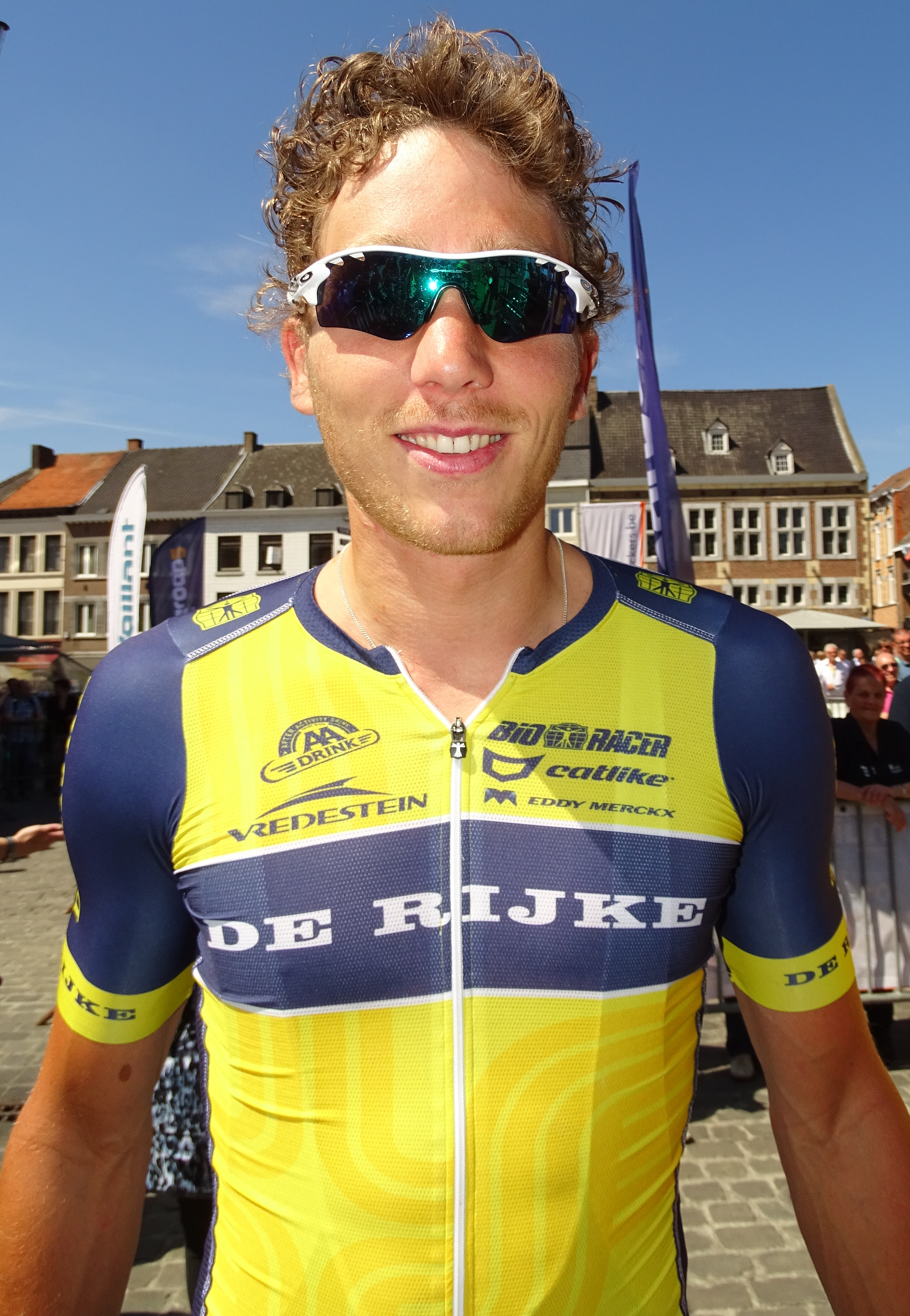
- Vermeltfoort at the 2015 Ronde van Limburg.

Personal information
- Full name: Coen Vermeltfoort
- Born: 11 April 1988 (age 38) Heeswijk, the Netherlands
- Height: 1.90 m (6 ft 3 in)
- Weight: 85 kg (187 lb)

Cycling career
- Sport: Cycling
- Current team: VolkerWessels Cycling Team
- Discipline: Road
- Role: Rider

Professional teams
- 2007–2010: Rabobank Continental Team
- 2011–2012: Rabobank
- 2013–2016: Cycling Team De Rijke–Shanks
- 2017–2018: Roompot–Nederlandse Loterij
- 2019: Alecto Cycling Team
- 2020–: VolkerWessels–Merckx Cycling Team

Coen Vermeltfoort (born 11 April 1988) is a Dutch racing cyclist, who currently rides for UCI Continental team VolkerWessels Cycling Team.

== Major results ==
2006
5th Omloop Mandel-Leie-Schelde
2007
3rd Grand Prix de Waregem
6th Overall Olympia's Tour

1st Stage 5

10th Omloop van het Houtland
2008
1st Ronde van Drenthe
1st Paris–Roubaix Espoirs
Tour de Bretagne

1st Stages 1 & 2

1st Stage 5 Grand Prix Guillaume Tell
1st Stage 3 Tour de l'Avenir
4th Profronde van Fryslan
5th ZLM Tour
6th Overall Le Triptyque des Monts et Châteaux
7th Overall Olympia's Tour

1st Stages 1 & 3

10th Beverbeek Classic
2010
1st Zellik–Galmaarden
2nd Overall Olympia's Tour

1st Stages 4 & 6

2nd Omloop der Kempen
3rd Dwars door Drenthe
6th Omloop van het Waasland
8th Ronde van Drenthe
2013
1st Arno Wallaard Memorial
1st Grote 1-MeiPrijs
1st Prologue Olympia's Tour
1st Prologue (TTT) Volta a Portugal
5th Zuid Oost Drenthe Classic II
7th Ronde van Overijssel
7th Omloop der Kempen
2014
Flèche du Sud

1st Points classification
1st Stages 1, 3 & 4

1st Stage 4 Circuit des Ardennes
2nd Ronde van Overijssel
2nd Baronie Breda Classic
3rd Omloop van het Houtland
4th Overall Olympia's Tour

1st Sprints classification
1st Prologue

9th Grote Prijs Jef Scherens
2015
2nd De Kustpijl
3rd Omloop van het Houtland
3rd Ronde van Overijssel
7th Parel van de Veluwe
8th Ster van Zwolle
10th Ronde van Zeeland Seaports
2016
Flèche du Sud

1st Points classification
1st Stages 1 & 5

2nd Ster van Zwolle
3rd Dorpenomloop Rucphen
4th Ronde van Limburg
7th Overall Tour de Normandie
9th Arnhem–Veenendaal Classic
2017
2nd Sluitingsprijs Putte-Kapelle
4th Road race, National Road Championships
5th Halle–Ingooigem
5th Handzame Classic
6th Nokere Koerse
6th Trofeo Playa de Palma
6th Tacx Pro Classic
7th Grand Prix de Denain
7th Primus Classic
8th Trofeo Porreres-Felanitx-Ses Salines-Campos
9th Ronde van Overijssel
2018
2nd Elfstedenronde
3rd Trofeo Palma
6th Grand Prix de Denain
10th Ronde van Limburg
2019
1st Ster van Zwolle
1st Slag om Norg
9th Arno Wallaard Memorial
10th Road race, National Road Championships
2020
3rd Ster van Zwolle
2021
1st Ster van Zwolle
2nd Omloop der Kempen
2nd Dorpenomloop Rucphen
3rd Omloop van Valkenswaard
4th Ronde van Drenthe
5th PWZ Zuidenveld Tour
6th Overall Course de Solidarność et des Champions Olympiques
2022
1st Stage 1a Course Cycliste de Solidarnosc et des Champions Olympiques
1st PWZ Zuidenveld Tour
1st Ronde van Overijssel
1st Grote Prijs Rik Van Looy
1st Ronde van de Achterhoek
1st 2 Districtenpijl-Ekeren-Deurne
1st Stage 7 Tour de Normandie
2nd Ronde van Limburg
2nd Sluitingsprijs Putte-Kapellen
4th Overall Tour du Loir-et-Cher

1st Stage 4

4th Visit Friesland Elfsteden Race
4th Memorial Briek Schotte
4th Omloop der Kempen
7th Puivelde Koerse
7th Memorial Rik Van Steenbergen
2023
1st Ster van Zwolle
1st Wielerronde van Oploo
1st Ronde van Overijssel
1st Omloop der Kempen
1st Nationale Sluitingsprijs
1st Stage 4 Course de Solidarność et des Champions Olympiques
2nd Grote Ronde van Gerwen
2nd Arno Wallaard Memorial
3rd Ronde van Midden-Brabant
3rd Omloop van de Houtse Linies
8th Grand Prix Cerami
