= Davide De Cassan =

Italian cyclist (born 2002)

Personal information
- Full name: Davide De Cassan
- Born: 4 January 2002 (age 24) Riva del Garda, Italy
- Height: 1.70 m (5 ft 7 in)
- Weight: 61 kg (134 lb)

Cycling career
- Sport: Cycling
- Current team: Team Polti VisitMalta
- Discipline: Road
- Role: Rider

Amateur team
- 2019–2020: US Ausonia Csi Pescantina

Professional teams
- 2021–2023: Cycling Team Friuli ASD
- 2023: Eolo–Kometa (stagiaire)
- 2024–: Polti–Kometa

Davide De Cassan (born 4 January 2002) is an Italian racing cyclist, who currently rides for UCI ProTeam Team Polti VisitMalta.

== Major results ==
2022
4th GP Palio del Recioto
4th Giro del Medio Brenta
7th Overall Carpathian Couriers Race
7th Ruota d'Oro
9th Overall Giro della Valle d'Aosta
10th Overall Okolo Slovenska
2023
1st GP Gorenjska
3rd Overall Carpathian Couriers Race

1st Stage 1 (TTT)

3rd Overall Grand Prix Jeseníky
5th Coppa Città di San Daniele
7th Overall Oberösterreich Rundfahrt

1st Young riders classification

9th GP Palio del Recioto
2024
6th Overall Tour de Taiwan
9th Giro della Romagna
2026
7th Overall Giro di Sardegna
