= Lemele =

- Village
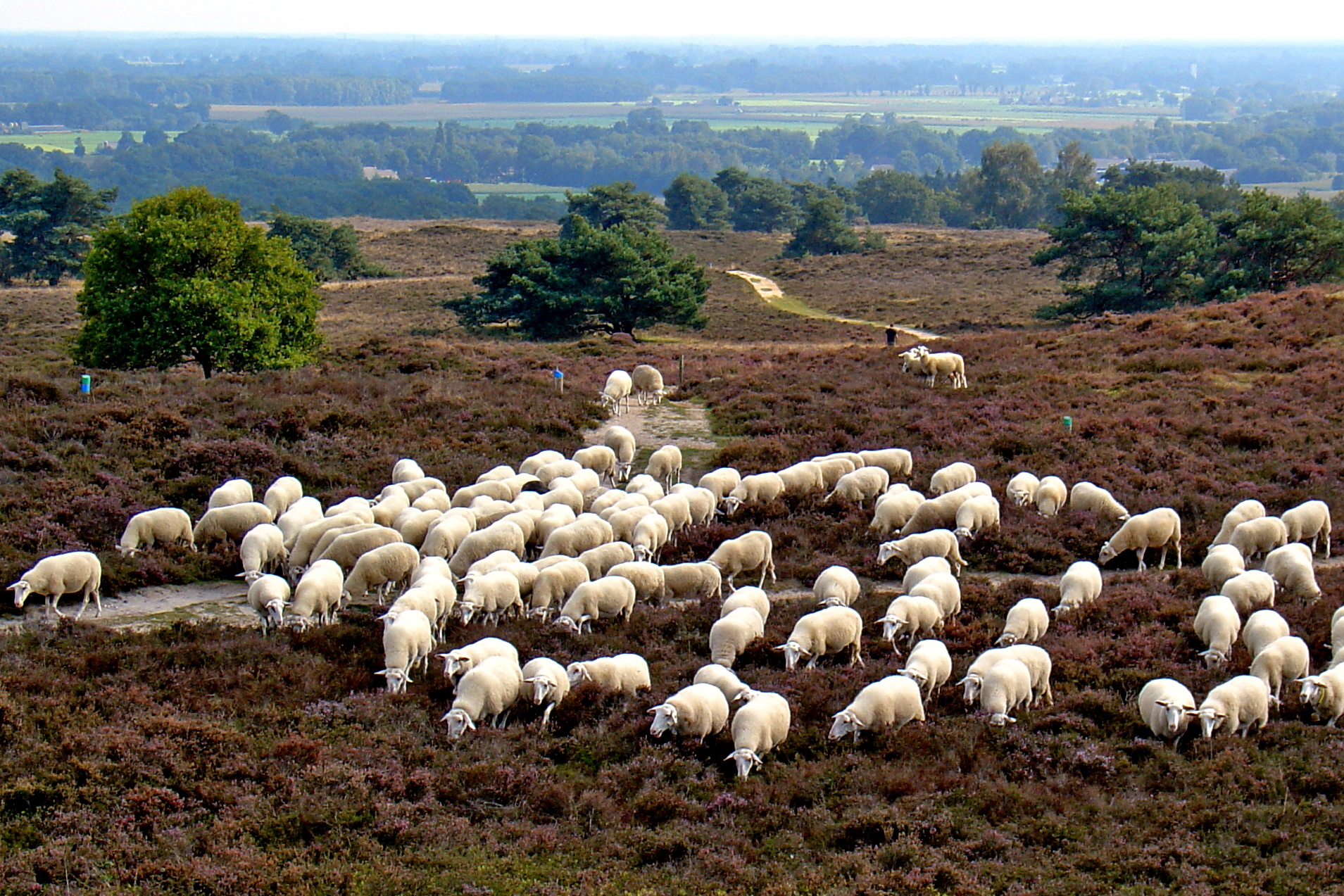
- A flock of sheep on the Archemerberg, near Lemele

- The village centre (dark green) and the statistical district (light green) of Lemele in the municipality of Ommen.

- Location in the province of Overijssel in the Netherlands Lemele (Netherlands)
- Coordinates: 52°27′8″N 6°24′53″E
- Country: Netherlands
- Province: Overijssel
- Municipality: Ommen

Area
  - Total: 14.51 km^{2} (5.60 sq mi)
- Elevation: 8 m (26 ft)

Population (2021)
  - Total: 1,260
  - Density: 86.8/km^{2} (225/sq mi)
- Time zone: UTC+1 (CET)
  - Summer (DST): UTC+2 (CEST)
- Postal code: 8148
- Dialing code: 0572

Lemele is a village in the Dutch province of Overijssel. It is a part of the municipality of Ommen, and lies about 20 km northwest of Almelo.

== History ==
Lemele is an esdorp which developed on the foot of the Lemelerberg, a remnant of the Last Glacial Period. It was first mentioned between 1381 and 1383 as Lemelo, and means "clay near open forest". In 1840, it was home to 258 people. In 1863, it formed a short-lived municipality with Archem.

== Notable people ==
- Peter Schulting (born 1987), cyclist

== Gallery ==
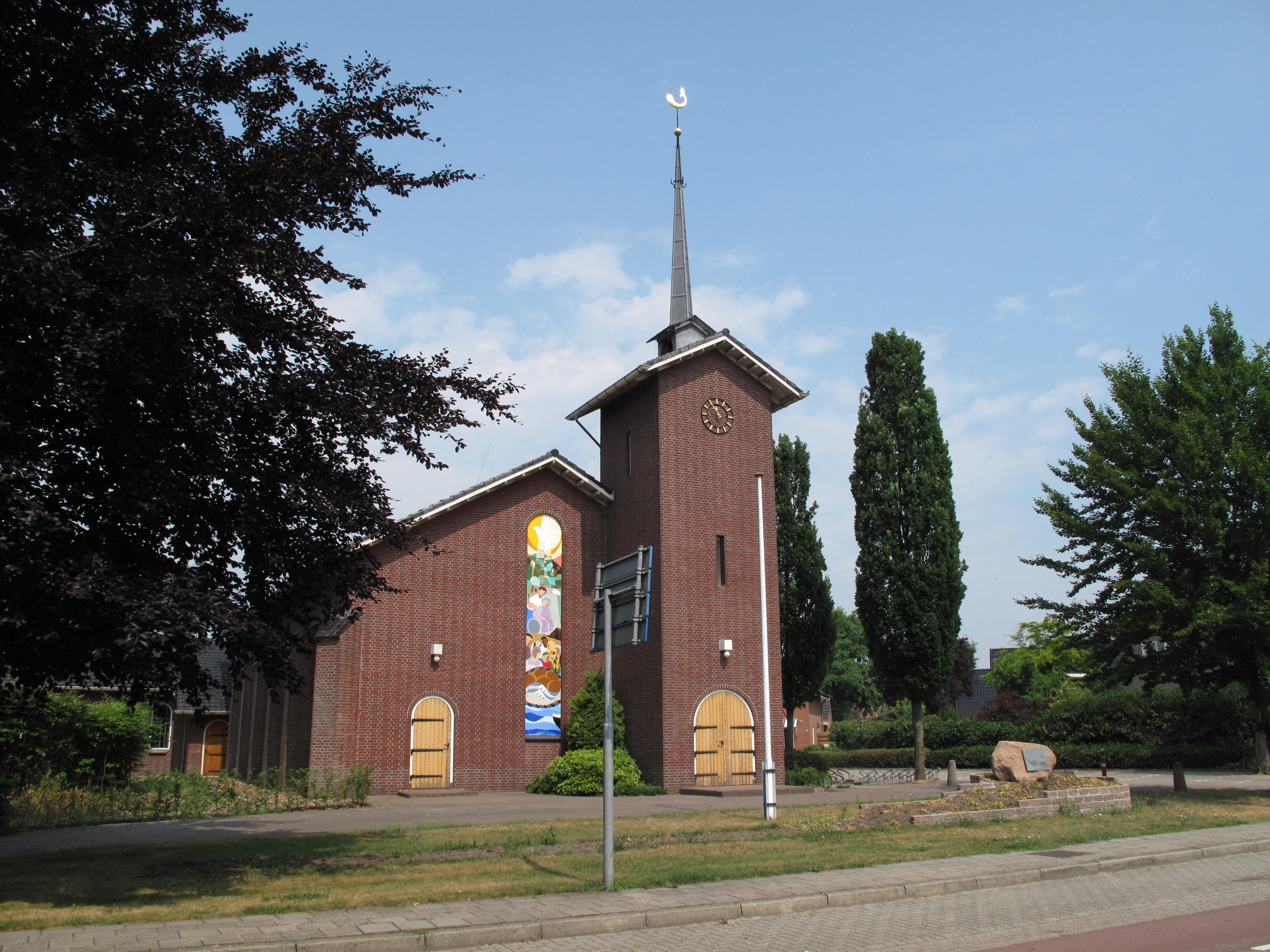
Church of Lemele

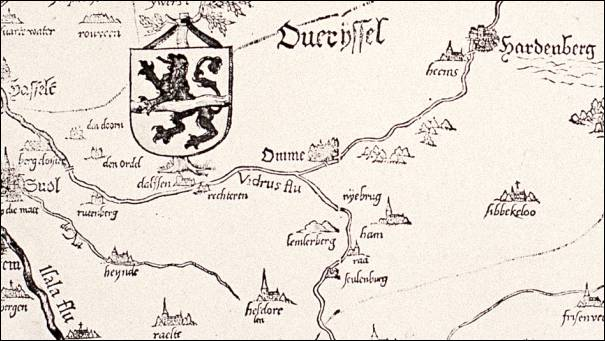
A map from 1559 showing the Lemelerberg

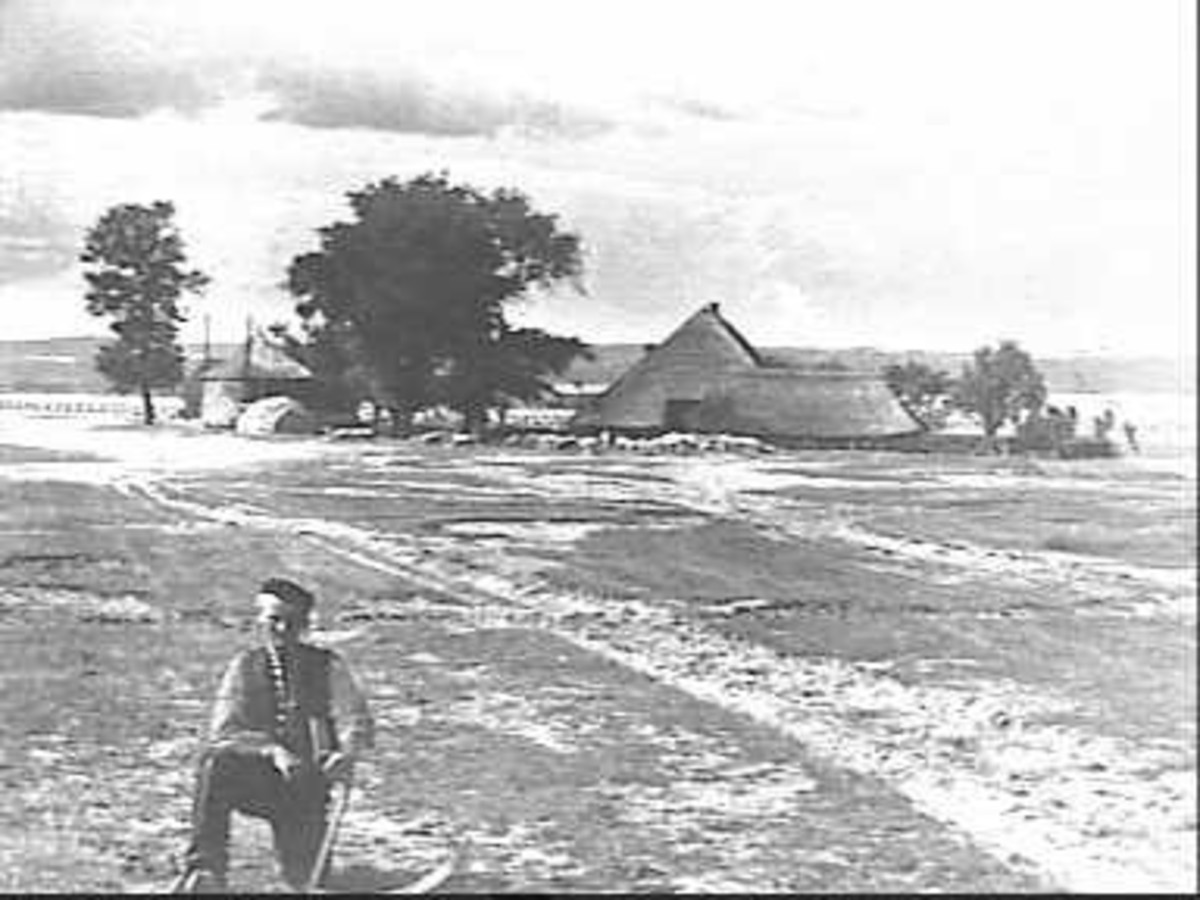
Old picture of farm and sheep pen
