= Peter Schulting =

Dutch bicycle racer

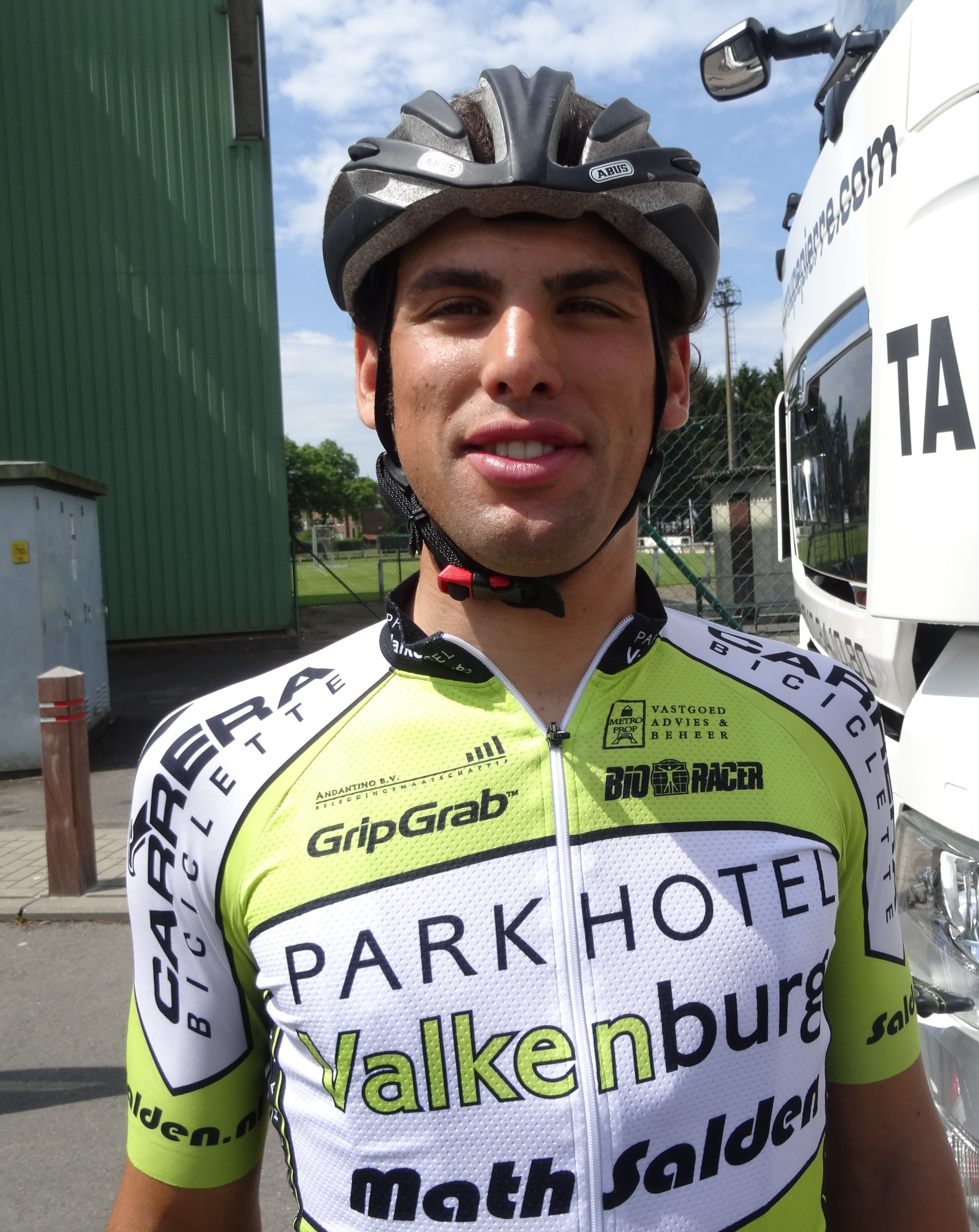
- Schulting in 2014.

Personal information
- Full name: Peter Schulting
- Born: 19 August 1987 (age 39) Lemele, Netherlands
- Height: 1.82 m (6 ft 0 in)
- Weight: 70 kg (154 lb)

Cycling career
- Sport: Cycling
- Current team: VolkerWessels Cycling Team
- Discipline: Road
- Role: Rider

Amateur teams
- 2009: WV Stormvogels Veendam
- 2013: Global Cycling Team
- 2013: Parkhotel Valkenburg
- 2017: PSL Cycling Club
- 2019: VolkerWessels–Merckx Cycling Team

Professional teams
- 2006–2008: Cycling Team Jo Piels
- 2010–2012: Cycling Team Jo Piels
- 2014–2016: Parkhotel Valkenburg Continental Team
- 2017: Destil–Jo Piels
- 2018: Monkey Town Continental Team
- 2020–: VolkerWessels–Merckx Cycling Team

Peter Schulting (born 19 August 1987) is a Dutch cyclist, who currently rides for UCI Continental team VolkerWessels Cycling Team.

== Major results ==
2007
5th Overall Tour de Berlin

1st Stage 3

8th Scandinavian Open Road Race
2009
8th Scandinavian Open Road Race
2010
1st Kernen Omloop Echt-Susteren
5th Ster van Zwolle
9th Overall Festningsrittet
2011
6th Antwerpse Havenpijl
10th Ronde van Overijssel
2013
8th Ster van Zwolle
2014
6th Overall Tour du Maroc
7th Arno Wallaard Memorial
Les Challenges de la Marche Verte

7th GP Sakia El Hamra
10th GP Sakia Al Massira

2015
10th Dorpenomloop Rucphen
2016 (1 pro win)
1st Stage 3 Kreiz Breizh Elites
2nd Overall Tour of Fuzhou
3rd Overall Tour of Taihu Lake
3rd Slag om Norg
4th Overall Tour de Taiwan

1st Mountains classification
1st Stage 3

8th Omloop Het Nieuwsblad U23
2017
1st Tobago Cycling Classic
6th Rad am Ring
7th Slag om Norg
7th Ronde van Noord-Holland
7th Dorpenomloop Rucphen
2018 (1)
1st Tacx Pro Classic
6th Midden–Brabant Poort Omloop
8th Overall Tour of Romania

1st Stages 1 & 4

2022
10th Overall Olympia's Tour

1st Stage 2

2024 (1)
1st Stage 3 ZLM Tour
