= Wessel Mouris =

Dutch cyclist

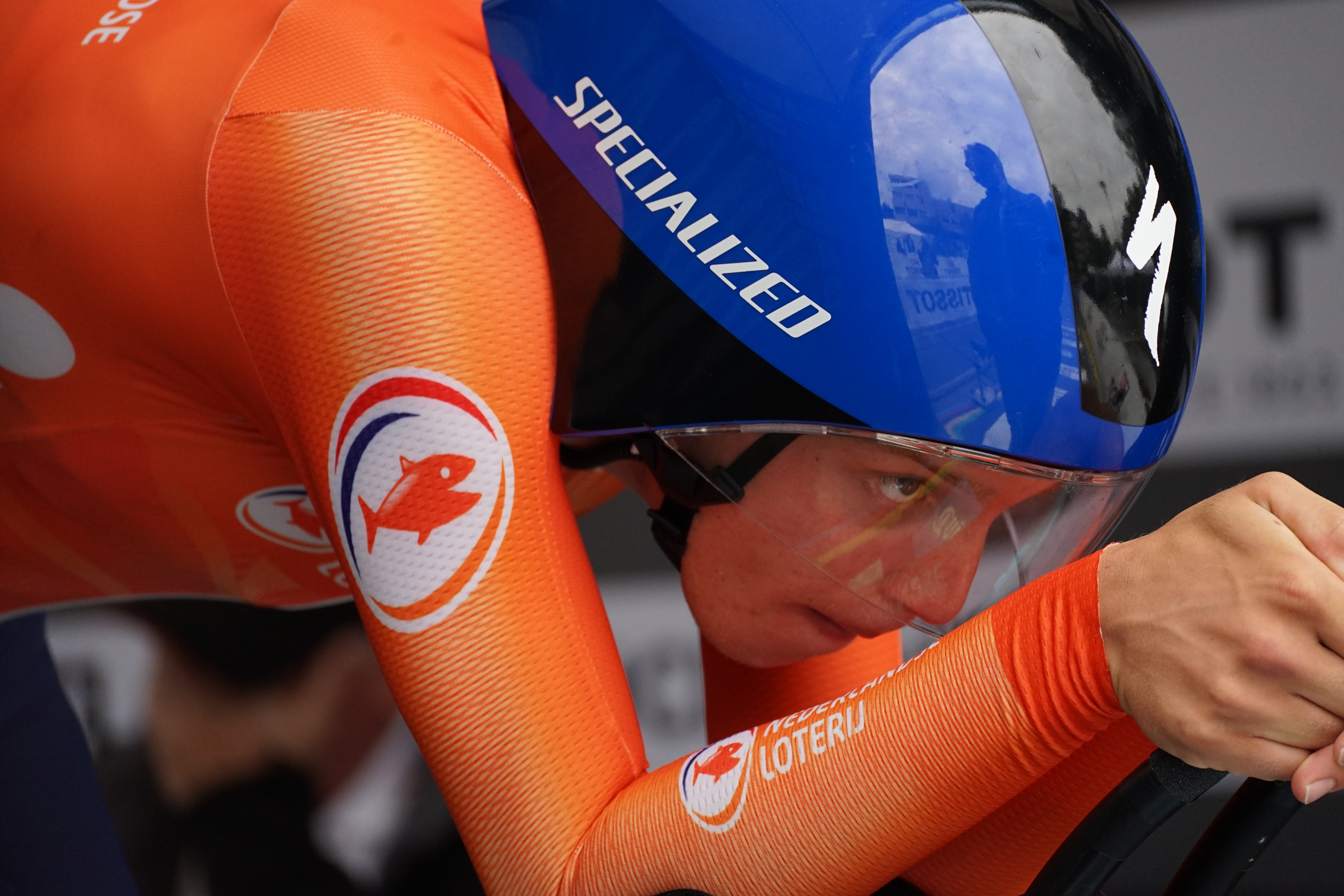
- Mouris in 2024

Personal information
- Born: 30 December 2002 (age 23) Amstelveen, Netherlands

Cycling career
- Sport: Cycling
- Current team: Unibet Rose Rockets
- Discipline: Road
- Role: Rider

Amateur teams
- 2019: WTC de Amstel
- 2020–2022: WP Groot Amsterdam

Professional teams
- 2023: Scorpions Racing Team
- 2024: Metec–Solarwatt p/b Mantel
- 2025–: Unibet Tietema Rockets
Medal record
Men's road cycling
Representing Netherlands
European Championships
Bronze medal – third place	2024 Limburg	Under-23 time trial

Wessel Mouris (born 30 December 2002) is a Dutch professional racing cyclist, who currently rides for UCI ProTeam Unibet Rose Rockets.

== Major results ==
2022
5th Road race, National Under-23 Road Championships
2023
4th Time trial, National Under-23 Road Championships
5th Overall Carpathian Couriers Race

1st Stage 2

2024
1st Time trial, National Under-23 Road Championships
1st Eschborn–Frankfurt Under-23
1st Stage 4 Grand Prix Jeseníky
3rd Time trial, UEC European Under-23 Road Championships
5th Overall ZLM Tour

1st Young rider classification

9th Time trial, UCI Road World Under-23 Championships
2026
6th Overall Tour Poitou-Charentes en Nouvelle-Aquitaine
7th Overall ZLM Tour
