= Timo de Jong =

Dutch bicycle racer (born 1999)

Personal information
- Born: 28 March 1999 (age 27) Goes, Netherlands
- Height: 1.91 m (6 ft 3 in)
- Weight: 72 kg (159 lb)

Cycling career
- Sport: Cycling
- Current team: Team Picnic–PostNL
- Discipline: Road
- Role: Rider

Amateur teams
- 2016–2017: Acrog–Balen BC Junior
- 2019: VolkerWessels–Merckx Cycling Team

Professional teams
- 2018: Destil–Parkhotel Valkenburg
- 2020–2025: VolkerWessels–Merckx Cycling Team
- 2026–: Team Picnic–PostNL

Timo de Jong (born 28 March 1999) is a Dutch cyclist, who currently rides for UCI WorldTeam Team Picnic–PostNL.

== Major results ==
2016
1st Ronde van Vlaanderen voor Junioren
2017
1st Points classification, Ronde des Vallées
8th La route des Géants
2018
1st Stage 5 Carpathian Couriers Race
2019
1st Overall Arden Challenge

1st Stage 2

2021
1st GP Dr. Eugeen Roggeman
1st Clásica Ciudad de Torredonjimeno
1st Oost-Vlaamse Sluitingsprijs
3rd Omloop van de Braakman
5th Ronde van de Achterhoek
6th Ronde van Drenthe
10th Overall Okolo Jižních Čech

1st Stage 1 (TTT)

2022
3rd Visit Friesland Elfsteden Race
3rd Omloop van de Braakman
2023
1st Ronde van De Lier
6th Memorial Philippe Van Coningsloo
8th Volta Limburg Classic
2024
1st Nationale Sluitingsprijs
1st Kermisronde Bergeijk
2nd Puivelde Koerse
2nd Schaal Sels
2nd Izegem Koers
2nd Oost-Vlaamse Sluitingsprijs
3rd Omloop van de Braakman
4th Ronde van Overijssel
9th Overall Kreiz Breizh Elites
2025 (1 pro win)
1st Midden-Brabant Poort Omloop
2nd Overall Olympia's Tour

1st Stage 2

3rd Puivelde Koerse
5th Arno Wallaard Memorial
6th Omloop der Kempen
7th Overall Tour of Holland

1st Stage 4

8th Slag om Norg
