= 2024 UCI Oceania Tour =

- Twentieth edition of the UCI Oceania Tour

Details
- Dates: 10–25 January
- Location: Australia, New Zealand
- Races: 3

The 2024 UCI Oceania Tour was the 20th season of the UCI Oceania Tour.

The UCI ratings from highest to lowest were are as follows:

- Multi-day events: 2.1 and 2.2
- One-day events: 1.1 and 1.2

== Events ==
Races in the 2024 UCI Oceania Tour
Race	Rating	Date	Winner	Team
New Zealand Cycle Classic	2.2	10–14 January	Aaron Gate (NZL)	New Zealand
(New Zealand) Gravel and Tar Classic	1.2	20 January	Josh Burnett (NZL)	Whoosh–NZ Cycling Project
(Australia) Surf Coast Classic	1.1	25 January	Biniam Girmay (ERI)	Intermarché–Wanty
