= Max Walker (cyclist) =

British cyclist

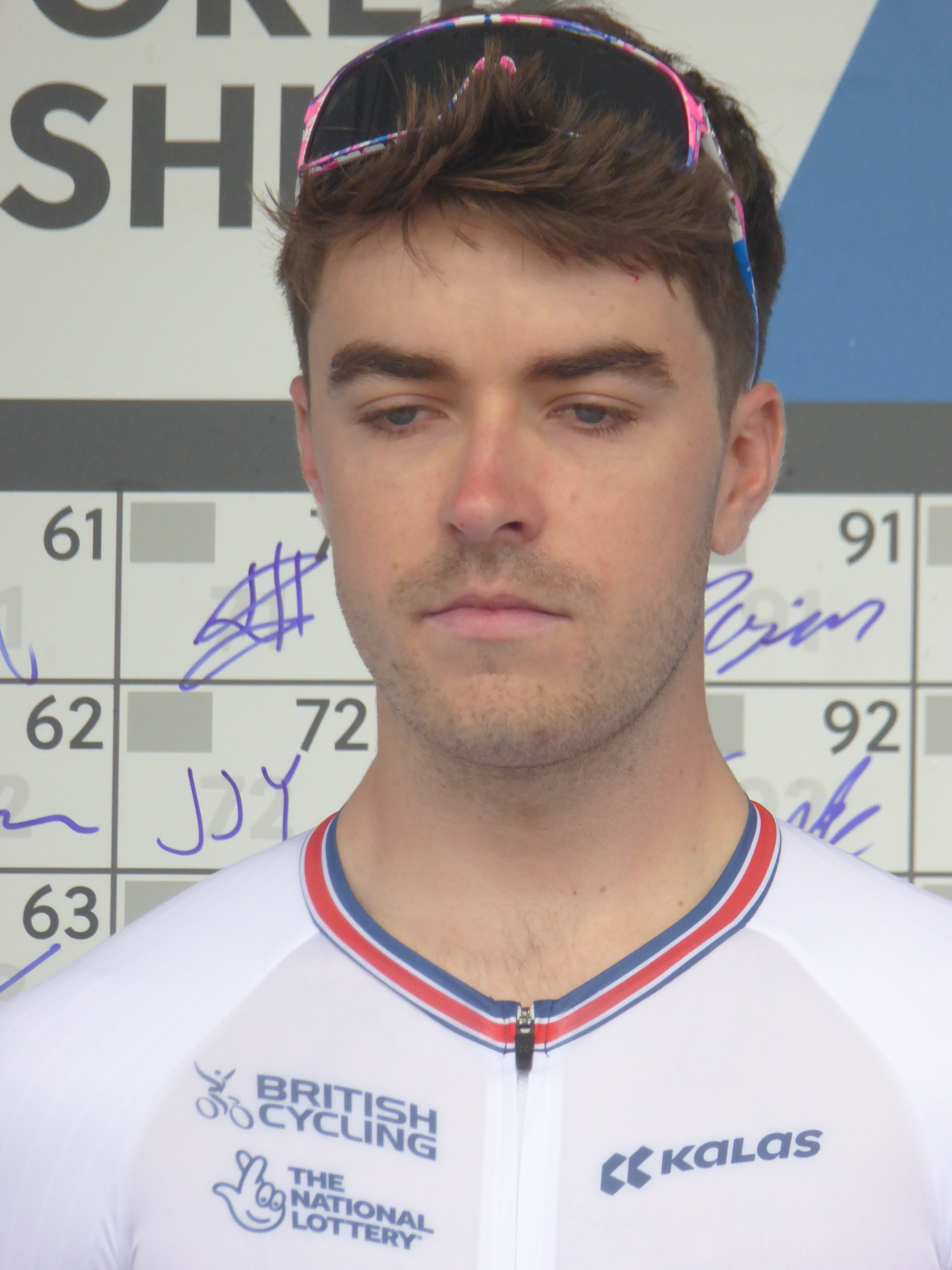
- Walker in 2023

Personal information
- Born: 12 July 2001 (age 25) Douglas, Isle of Man

Cycling career
- Sport: Cycling
- Current team: EF Education–EasyPost
- Discipline: Road
- Role: Rider

Professional teams
- 2020–2022: Trinity Racing
- 2023: Saint Piran
- 2024: Astana Qazaqstan Development Team
- 2025–: EF Education–EasyPost

Max Walker (born 12 July 2001) is a Manx cyclist who rides for UCI WorldTeam EF Education–EasyPost. He was runner-up at the British National Time Trial Championships in 2024.

== Career ==
In 2022, he had a top ten finish in the men’s under-23 time trial at the British National Road Race Championships. Riding for Trinity Racing he finished fifth at the Cicle Classic and the Ronde de l'Isard.

In 2023, he signed for Saint Piran after three years at Trinity Racing. He finished second at the 2023 British National Time Trial Championships U23 race. At the same event he also finished third in the Under-23 men's road race. In August 2023, he placed ninth in the Men's under-23 road race at the 2023 UCI Road World Championships in Glasgow.

In February 2024, he signed for Astana Qazaqstan Development Team. He won two stage victories and finished fourth in the points standings during the Tour of Japan in May 2024. He placed second overall at the ZLM Tour in the Netherlands in June 2024.

On 19 June 2024, he finished runner-up to Josh Tarling at the British National Time Trial Championships in Catterick.

Walker was selected for the 2026 Tour de France.

== Personal life ==
His brother, Zac, is also a cyclist.

== Major results ==
2019
2nd Road race, National Junior Road Championships
2nd Overall Sint-Martinusprijs Kontich

1st Stage 1 (TTT)

2nd Guido Reybrouck Classic
9th EPZ Omloop van Borsele
2021
8th Overall Tour de la Mirabelle
2022
5th Overall Ronde de l'Isard
5th Rutland–Melton CiCLE Classic
9th Lincoln Grand Prix
2023
National Under-23 Road Championships

2nd Time trial
3rd Road race

3rd Beaumont Trophy
6th Overall Volta ao Alentejo

1st Young rider classification

8th Giro del Belvedere
9th Road race, UCI Road World Under-23 Championships
2024 (1 pro win)
Tour of Japan

1st Stages 1 (ITT) & 7

1st Stage 2b (ITT) Sibiu Cycling Tour
National Road Championships

2nd Time trial
3rd Road race

2nd Overall ZLM Tour
5th International Rhodes Grand Prix
9th Grand Prix Goriska & Vipava Valley
2025
5th Time trial, National Road Championships

=== Grand Tour general classification results timeline ===
Grand Tour	2026
Giro d'Italia	—
Tour de France	106
Vuelta a España	

Legend
—	Did not compete
DNF	Did not finish
