= Gleb Syritsa =

Russian cyclist

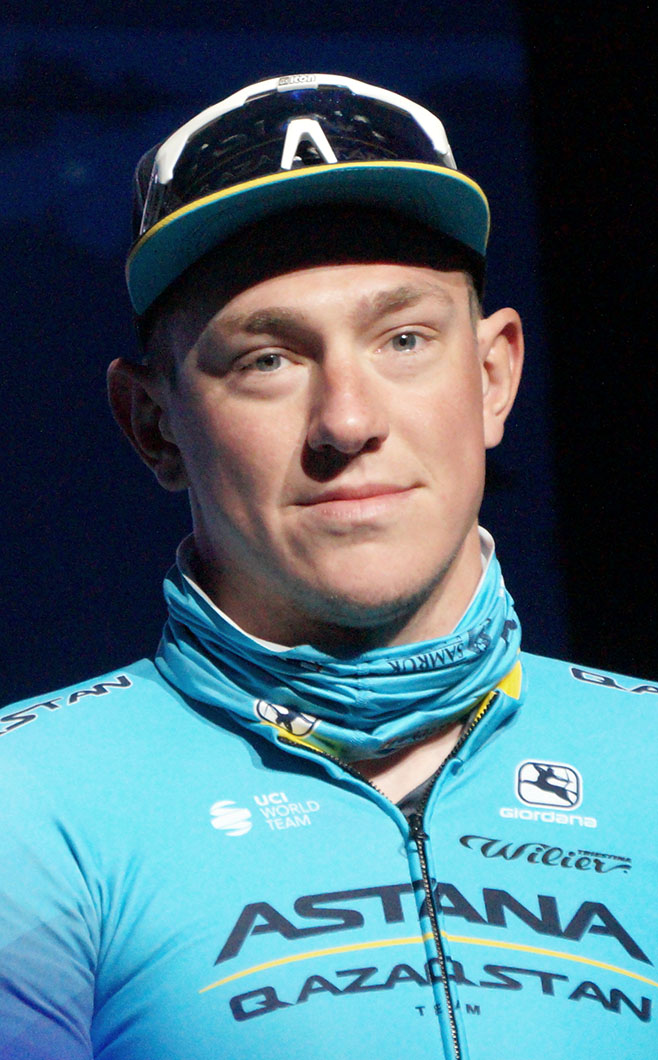
- Syritsa in 2023

Personal information
- Born: 14 April 2000 (age 26)
- Height: 1.89 m (6 ft 2 in)
- Weight: 85 kg (187 lb)

Cycling career
- Sport: Cycling
- Current team: XDS Astana Development Team
- Disciplines: Track; Road
- Role: Rider
- Rider type: Sprinter (Road); Pursuitist (Track)

Amateur teams
- 2017–2018: Lokosphinx Junior
- 2019–2020: Lokosphinx Amateur
- 2022: CC Catalunya–Barcelona

Professional teams
- 2021: Lokosphinx
- 2022: Astana Qazaqstan Team (stagiaire)
- 2023–2024: Astana Qazaqstan Team
- 2025: XDS Astana Development Team
- 2026–: XDS Astana Team
Medal record
Men's track cycling
Representing Russia
European Games
Gold medal – first place	2019 Minsk	Team pursuit

Gleb Syritsa (Russian: Глеб Сырица, born 14 April 2000) is a Russian road and track cyclist, who currently rides for UCI WorldTeam XDS Astana Team.

== Major results ==
=== Road ===
2019
1st Vicenza-Bionde
10th Circuito del Porto
2020
2nd Grand Prix Mount Erciyes
2021
1st Circuito del Porto
1st Vicenza-Bionde
2022 (1 pro win)
1st Overall Circuito Montañés
1st Circuito Guadiana
1st Trofeu Joan Escolà
1st Trophée Guerrita
1st Stage 1 Tour de Langkawi
1st Stage 3 Vuelta a Zamora
2023 (2)
Tour de Langkawi

1st Stages 2 & 8

2024 (1)
1st Stage 1 Tour de Langkawi
5th Clàssica Comunitat Valenciana 1969
6th Overall ZLM Tour
7th Gooikse Pijl
2025
1st Prologue International Tour of Rhodes
2nd Time trial, National Road Championships
7th Grote Prijs Jean-Pierre Monseré
7th Antwerp Port Epic
9th Elfstedenronde

=== Track ===
2017
UCI World Junior Championships

1st Team pursuit
2nd Madison (with Lev Gonov)

1st Team pursuit, UEC European Junior Championships
2nd Team pursuit, National Championships
3rd Team pursuit, UCI World Cup, Minsk
2018
National Championships

1st Team pursuit
2nd Madison

UCI World Junior Championships

2nd Madison (with Lev Gonov)
3rd Individual pursuit

3rd Team pursuit, UEC European Under-23 Championships
2019
1st Team pursuit, European Games
1st Team pursuit, UEC European Under-23 Championships
National Championships

1st Team pursuit
2nd Madison

2020
UEC European Under-23 Championships

1st Points race
1st Omnium
1st Team pursuit

National Championships

1st Omnium
2nd Madison

2021
National Championships

1st Madison (with Vlas Shichkin)
1st Individual pursuit
1st Team pursuit

UCI Nations Cup

1st Individual pursuit, St. Petersburg
1st Team pursuit, St. Petersburg
