= Casper van Uden =

Dutch cyclist

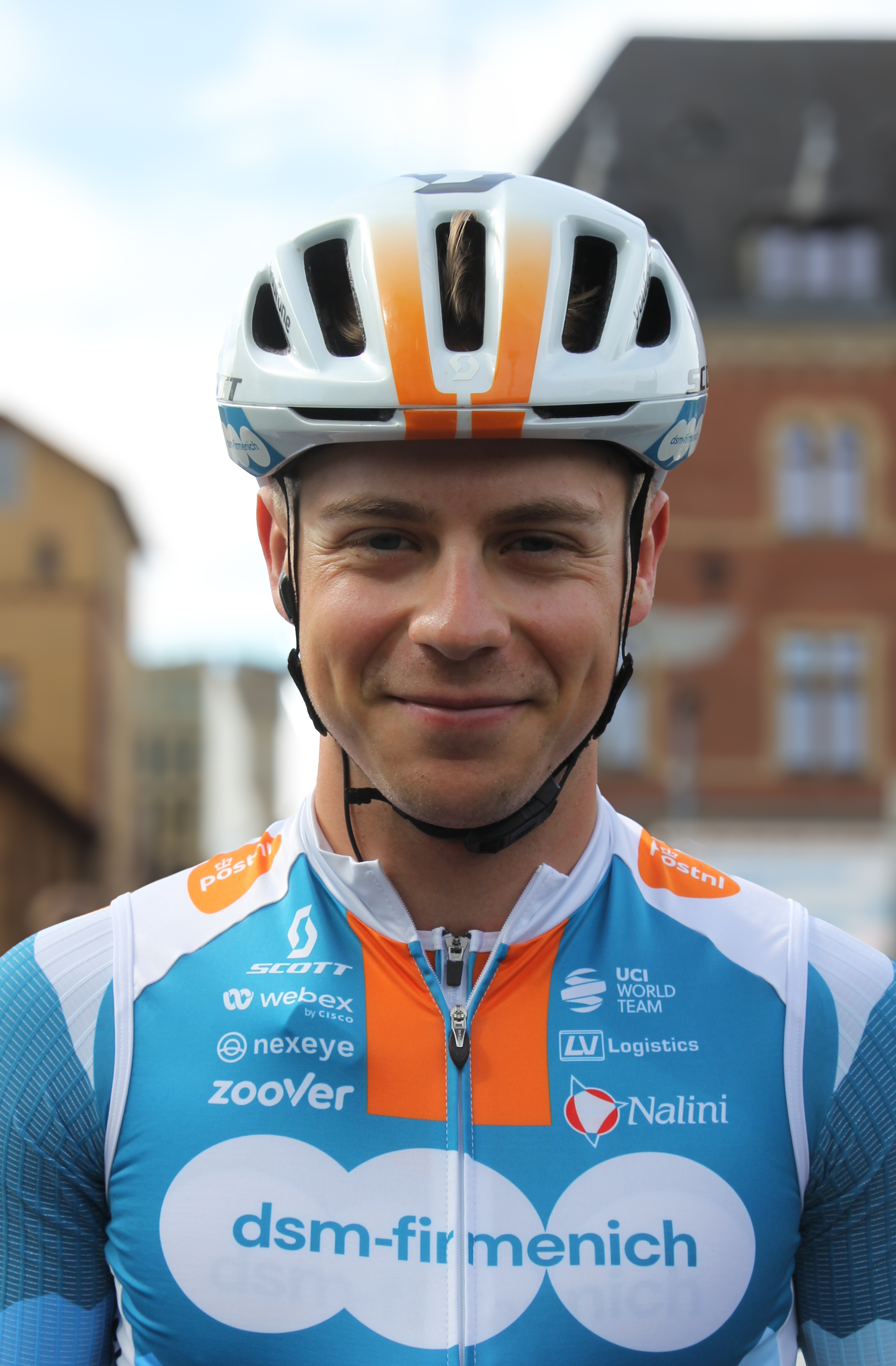

Personal information
- Born: 22 July 2001 (age 25) Schiedam, Netherlands

Cycling career
- Sport: Cycling
- Current team: Team Picnic–PostNL
- Discipline: Road
- Role: Rider

Professional teams
- 2020–2022: Development Team Sunweb
- 2022–: Team DSM

Major wins
- Grand Tours Giro d'Italia 1 individual stage (2025)

Casper van Uden (born 22 July 2001) is a Dutch cyclist, who currently rides for UCI WorldTeam Team Picnic–PostNL.

On 1 August 2022 he joined Team DSM on a contract that lasts until the end of 2024.

== Major results ==
2018
4th La Philippe Gilbert Juniors
5th Bernaudeau Junior
2019
1st Kuurne–Brussel–Kuurne Juniors
1st Points classification, Course de la Paix Juniors
3rd Time trial, National Junior Road Championships
3rd Johan Museeuw Classic
6th Overall Keizer der Juniores
8th Road race, UEC European Junior Road Championships
8th La Route des Géants
2020
1st Stage 2b (TTT) Ronde de l'Isard
2021
1st Ronde van de Achterhoek
1st Stage 2 (TTT) Tour de l'Avenir
2nd Paris–Tours Espoirs
3rd Road race, National Under-23 Road Championships
3rd Overall Course de Solidarność et des Champions Olympiques

1st Stages 3 & 5

9th Overall Orlen Nations Grand Prix
2022
Tour de l'Avenir

1st Points classification
1st Prologue (TTT)

1st Stage 4 Tour de Bretagne
4th Scheldeprijs
4th Grand Prix de la Somme
5th Overall Tour de Normandie

1st Stages 2 & 4

8th Münsterland Giro
2023
3rd Milano–Torino
6th Omloop van het Houtland
9th Ronde van Drenthe
2024 (4 pro wins)
1st Rund um Köln
ZLM Tour

1st Stages 2 & 4

1st Stage 1 AlUla Tour
2nd Heistse Pijl
2025 (1)
1st Stage 4 Giro d'Italia
2026 (1)
1st Stage 5 Tour of Turkiye
