= Slag om Norg =

Dutch cycling competition

Race details
- Date: August (until 2016); July (2017)
- Region: Netherlands
- Discipline: Road race
- Competition: UCI Europe Tour
- Type: Single day race
- Web site: www.slagomnorg.nl

History
- First edition: 2012
- Editions: 9 (as of 2025)
- First winner: Mike Teunissen (NED)
- Most wins: No repeat winners
- Most recent: Finn Crockett (IRL)

The Slag om Norg is a one-day cycling race held annually in the Netherlands. It is part of UCI Europe Tour in category 1.1 since 2017.

== Winners ==
Year	Country	Rider	Team
2012	Netherlands	Mike Teunissen	
2013	Netherlands	Gert-Jan Bosman	
2014	Netherlands	Ronan van Zandbeek	Cyclingteam de Rijke
2015	Netherlands	Johim Ariesen	Metec–TKH
2016	Netherlands	Fabio Jakobsen	SEG Racing Academy
2017	Belgium	Gianni Vermeersch	Beobank–Corendon
2018	Netherlands	Jan-Willem van Schip	Roompot–Nederlandse Loterij
2019	Netherlands	Coen Vermeltfoort	Alecto Cycling Team
2020	No race due to COVID-19 pandemic		
2021	No race due to COVID-19 pandemic		
2022	No race due to the unavailability of enough police officers to secure the race		
2022–2024	No race		
2025	Ireland	Finn Crockett	VolkerWessels Cycling Team
