= Maikel Zijlaard =

Dutch road bicycle racer

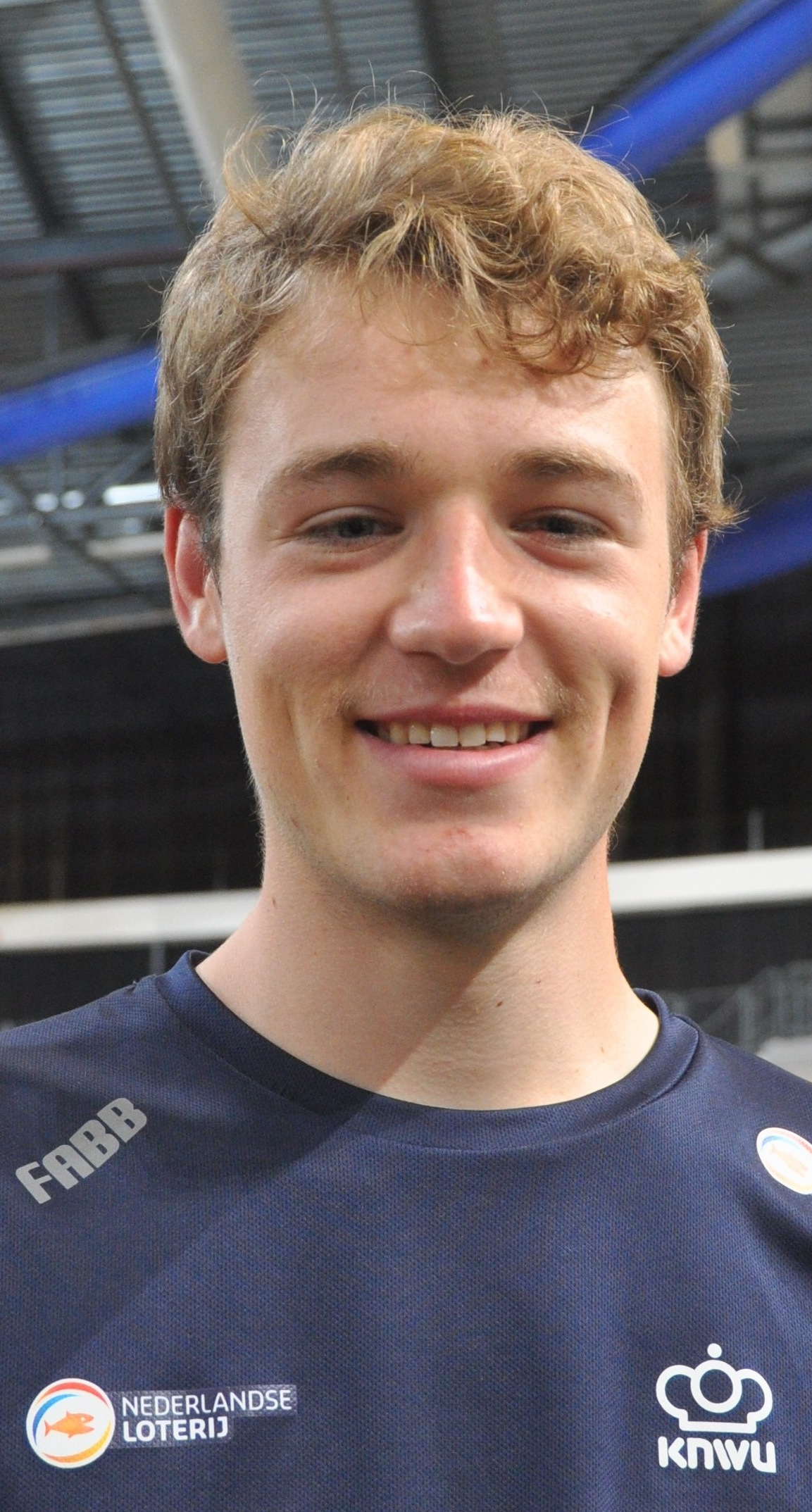
- Zijlaard in 2021

Personal information
- Born: 1 June 1999 (age 27) Rotterdam, Netherlands
- Height: 1.87 m (6 ft 2 in)
- Weight: 73 kg (161 lb)

Cycling career
- Sport: Cycling
- Current team: Tudor Pro Cycling Team
- Disciplines: Road; Track
- Role: Rider

Professional teams
- 2018–2019: Hagens Berman Axeon
- 2020–2021: SEG Racing Academy
- 2022: VolkerWessels Cycling Team
- 2023–: Tudor Pro Cycling Team

Maikel Zijlaard (born 1 June 1999) is a Dutch racing cyclist, who currently rides for UCI ProTeam Tudor Pro Cycling Team.

Professional since 2018, Zijlaard took his first professional win on the road in April 2024, winning the prologue of the Tour de Romandie.

== Major results ==
=== Road ===
2016
1st Young rider classification, Driedaagse van Axel
1st Stage 1 (TTT) Sint-Martinusprijs Kontich
3rd Omloop der Vlaamse Gewesten
5th Overall La Coupe du Président de la Ville de Grudziądz
2017
1st Tour of Flanders Junioren
1st Menen–Kemmel–Menen
SPIE Internationale Juniorendriedaagse

1st Stages 2 (ITT) & 4

6th Overall Trofeo Karlsberg
6th Guido Reybrouck Classic
6th E3 Harelbeke Junioren
2021
9th Ronde van de Achterhoek
2022
1st Overall Olympia's Tour
1st Dorpenomloop Rucphen
2nd Arno Wallaard Memorial
10th Overall Okolo jižních Čech

1st Points classification
1st Stages 2 & 3

2023
3rd Classic Loire Atlantique
6th Cholet-Pays de la Loire
2024 (1 pro win)
1st Prologue Tour de Romandie
6th Grand Prix d'Isbergues
7th Nokere Koerse

=== Track ===
2018
2nd Derny, UEC European Championships
2019
National Championships

1st Individual pursuit
1st Team pursuit

2021
1st Elimination, UEC European Under-23 Championships
