= VolkerWessels Cycling Team =

Dutch cycling team

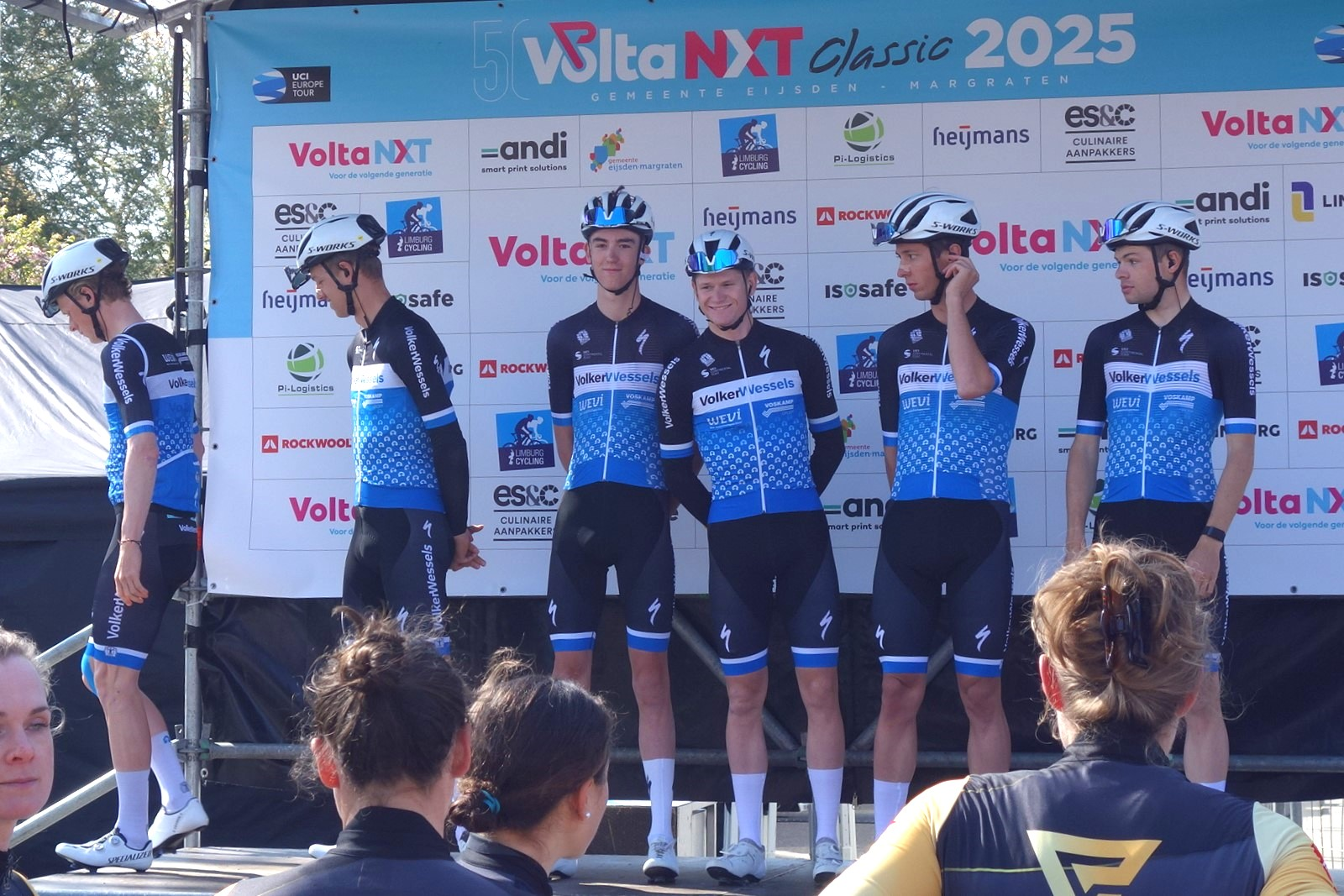
- The team in 2025

Team information
- UCI code: VWM (2019–2020); VWE (2021–)
- Registered: Netherlands Netherlands (2016–)
- Founded: 2016
- Status: Domestic (2016–2018); UCI Continental (2019–)
- Website: Team home page

Key personnel
- General manager: Vincent Rodijk
- Team manager: Allard Engels

Team name history
- 2016 2017–2020 2021–: Twente Salland Cyclingteam; VolkerWessels–Merckx Cycling Team; VolkerWessels Cycling Team

VolkerWessels Cycling Team is a UCI Continental road bicycle racing team established in 2016 in the Netherlands. The team was promoted to the UCI Continental level in 2019. The team's main sponsor is VolkerWessels, a Dutch construction company.

In 2024 VolkerWessels will also have a women's team. They will take over the former Parkhotel Valkenburg Cycling Team.

== Team roster ==
As of 10 February 2023.

Rider	Date of birth
Jord Baak (NED)	11 June 2000 (age 26)
Rindert Buiter (NED)	14 July 2003 (age 23)
Zak Coleman (GBR)	15 January 1999 (age 27)
Timo de Jong (NED)	28 March 1999 (age 27)
Youp de Vos (NED)	16 December 2003 (age 22)
Tijmen Eising (NED)	27 March 1991 (age 35)
Jasper Haest (NED)	28 April 1999 (age 27)
Jente Klaver (NED)	7 August 2003 (age 23)

Rider	Date of birth
Max Kroonen (NED)	23 August 2000 (age 26)
Bert-Jan Lindeman (NED)	16 June 1989 (age 37)
Jarno Mobach (NED)	17 August 1998 (age 28)
Peter Schulting (NED)	19 August 1987 (age 39)
Nick van der Meer (NED)	25 July 1993 (age 33)
Daan van Sintmaartensdijk (NED)	11 June 1998 (age 28)
Coen Vermeltfoort (NED)	11 April 1988 (age 38)
Thimo Willems (BEL)	9 February 1996 (age 30)

== Major results ==
2021
Stage 2 Course de Solidarność et des Champions Olympiques, Nick Brabander
Okolo jižních Čech

Stage 1 (TTT) (Note: The winning riders of Timo de Jong, Tijmen Eising, Rens Tulner, Nick van der Meer, Roel van Sintmaartensdijk, and Nils Wolfenbuttel.)
Stage 3, Nick van der Meer

Ster van Zwolle, Coen Vermeltfoort
2022
Dorpenomloop Rucphen, Maikel Zijlaard
Overall Olympia's Tour, Maikel Zijlaard

Stage 2 Peter Schulting

Stage 7 Tour de Normandie, Coen Vermeltfoort
Stage 4 Tour du Loir-et-Cher, Coen Vermeltfoort
PWZ Zuidenveld Tour, Coen Vermeltfoort
Ronde van Overijssel, Coen Vermeltfoort
Stage 1 Flèche du Sud, Daan van Sintmaartensdijk
Netherlands National U23 Road Race Championships, Max Kroonen
Stage 1a Course de Solidarność et des Champions Olympiques, Coen Vermeltfoort
2 Districtenpijl-Ekeren-Deurne, Coen Vermeltfoort
Stage 4 Kreiz Breizh Elites, Bart Lemmen
Ronde van de Achterhoek, Coen Vermeltfoort
Stages 2 & 3 Okolo jižních Čech, Maikel Zijlaard
Stage 4 Okolo Slovenska, Jasper Haest
Grote Prijs Rik Van Looy, Coen Vermeltfoort
