= Rune Herregodts =

Belgian cyclist

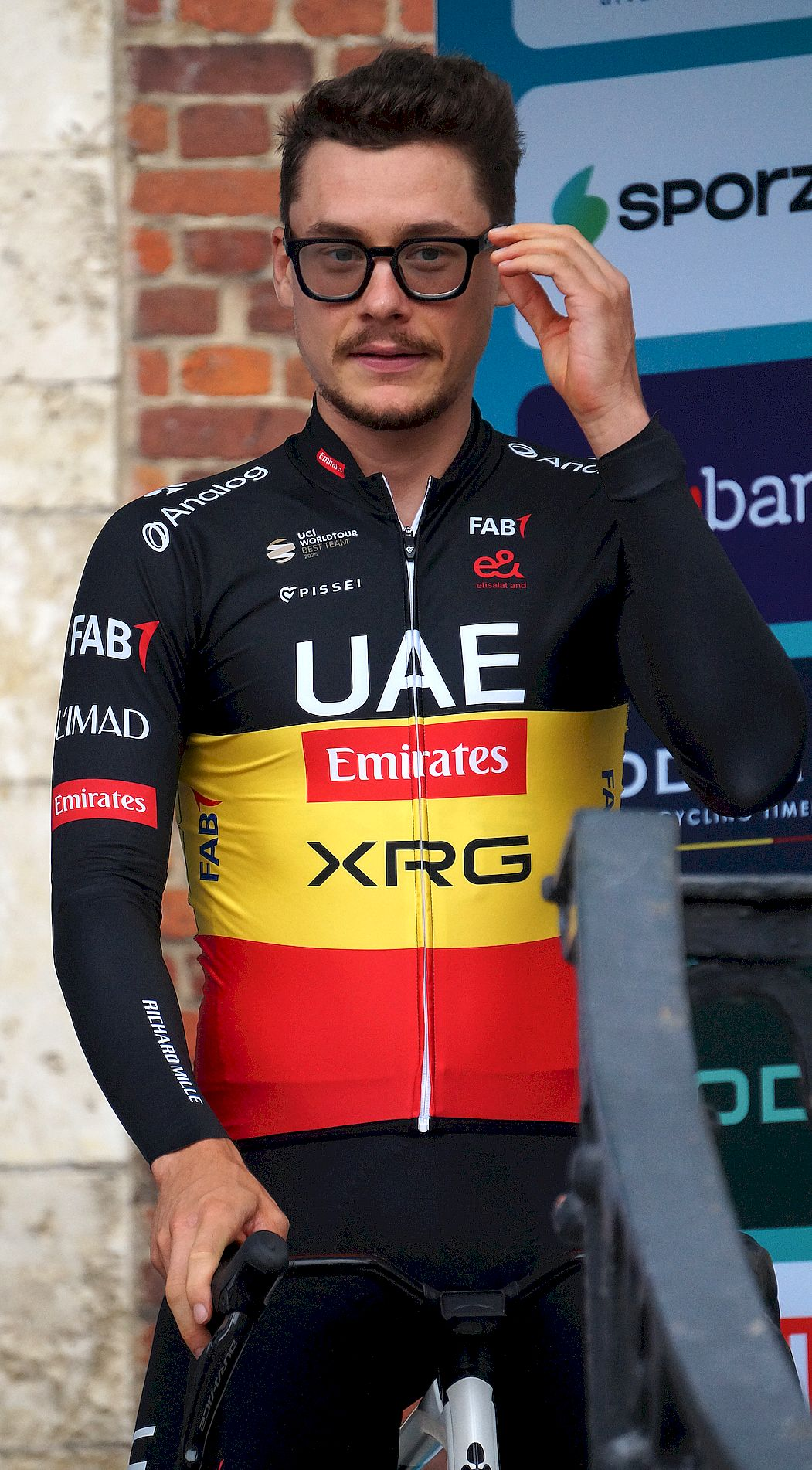
- Herregodts in 2026

Personal information
- Born: 27 July 1998 (age 28) Aalst, Belgium
- Height: 1.81 m (5 ft 11 in)
- Weight: 70 kg (154 lb)

Cycling career
- Sport: Cycling
- Current team: UAE Team Emirates XRG
- Disciplines: Road; Track
- Role: Rider

Amateur teams
- 2016: Van Moer Logistics
- 2017: ILLI-Bikes
- 2018–2019: Lotto–Soudal U23
- 2020: Home Solution–Soenens

Professional teams
- 2021–2022: Sport Vlaanderen–Baloise
- 2023–2024: Intermarché–Circus–Wanty
- 2025–: UAE Team Emirates XRG

Major wins
- One-day races and Classics National Road Race Championships (2026)

Rune Herregodts (born 27 July 1998) is a Belgian racing cyclist, who currently rides for UCI WorldTeam UAE Team Emirates XRG. He is the reigning Belgian National Road Race Champion, having won the title in 2026.

== Major results ==
2016
4th Overall Sint-Martinusprijs Kontich
2018
2nd Dorpenomloop Rucphen
2019
1st Individual pursuit, National Track Championships
2020
1st Paris–Tours Espoirs
2021 (1 pro win)
1st Ronde van Drenthe
3rd Trofeo Calvia
5th Trofeo Andratx–Mirador d’Es Colomer
6th Münsterland Giro
6th Chrono des Nations
2022 (2)
1st Stage 1 Vuelta a Andalucía
1st Stage 1 Sazka Tour
4th Time trial, National Road Championships
4th Brussels Cycling Classic
10th Overall Tour de Luxembourg
2023
2nd Figueira Champions Classic
3rd Time trial, National Road Championships
4th Volta Limburg Classic
6th Overall Tour of Norway
2024 (2)
1st Overall ZLM Tour

1st Stage 1 (ITT)

3rd Time trial, National Road Championships
10th Trofeo Serra de Tramuntana
2026 (1)
National Road Championships

1st Road race
4th Time trial

9th Copenhagen Sprint
9th Trofeo Calvià

=== Grand Tour general classification results timeline ===
Grand Tour	2023
Giro d'Italia	—
Tour de France	—
Vuelta a España	DNF
