= Roel van Sintmaartensdijk =

Dutch cyclist

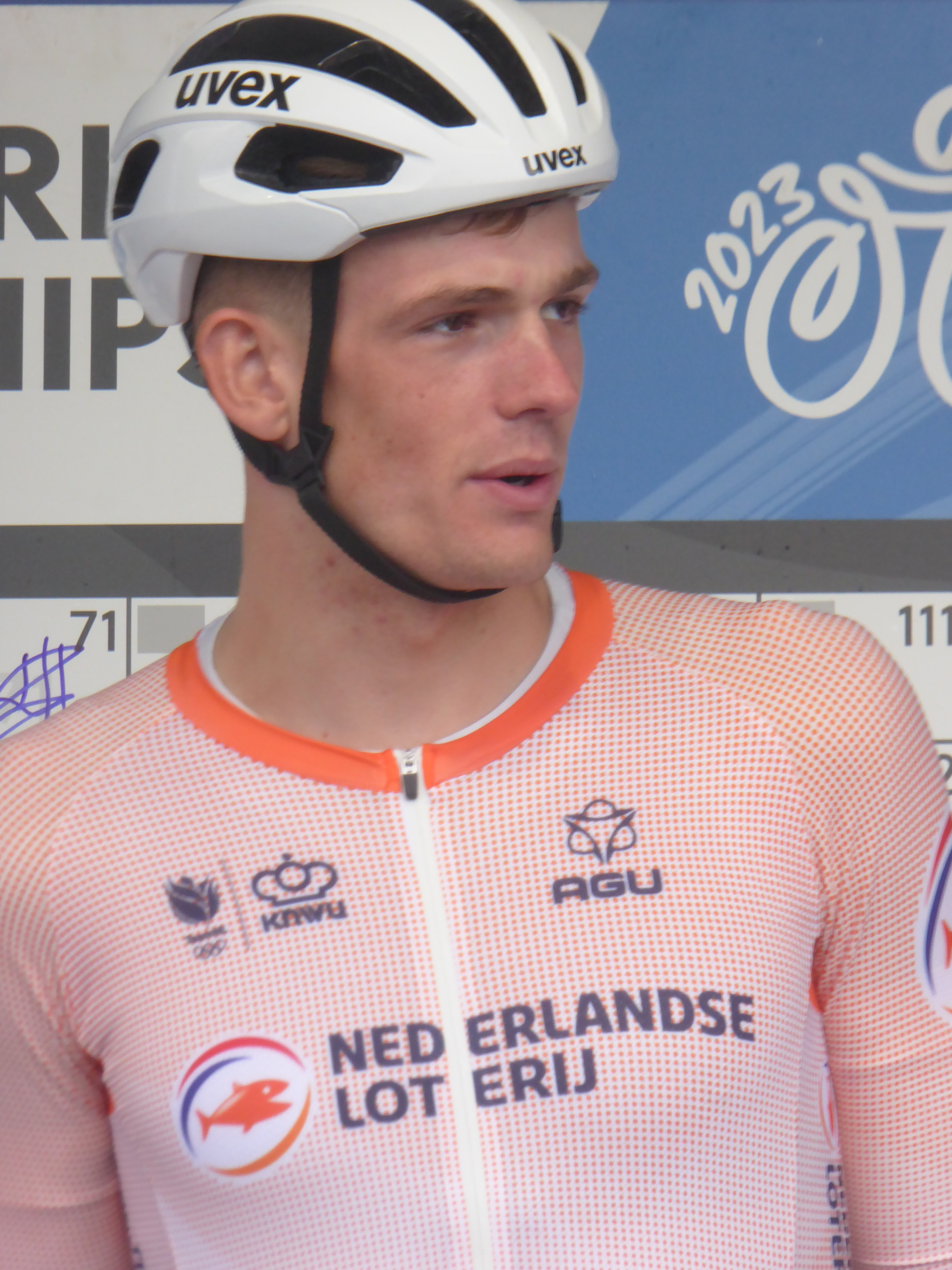
- Van Sintmaartensdijk in 2023

Personal information
- Born: 8 May 2001 (age 25) Zuidland, Netherlands
- Height: 1.97 m (6 ft 6 in)
- Weight: 77 kg (170 lb)

Cycling career
- Sport: Cycling
- Current team: Lotto–Intermarché
- Discipline: Road
- Role: Rider

Amateur teams
- 2019: Willebrord Wil Vooruit Juniors
- 2020: Team Reggeborgh

Professional teams
- 2021–2022: VolkerWessels Cycling Team
- 2023: Circus–ReUz–Technord
- 2024–2025: Intermarché–Wanty
- 2026–: Lotto–Intermarché

Roel van Sintmaartensdijk (born 8 May 2001) is a Dutch professional road cyclist, who currently rides for UCI WorldTeam Lotto–Intermarché. His brother Daan is also a professional cyclist.

== Major results ==
2019
1st Stage 1 Oberösterreich Juniorenrundfahrt
4th Overall Ronde des Vallées
6th Chrono des Nations Juniors
8th Overall Tour de DMZ
8th Trofee van Vlaanderen
2021
1st Stage 1 (TTT) Okolo Jižních Čech
2022
1st Omloop der Kempen
1st Omloop van de Braakman
1st Omloop van Valkenswaard
4th Overall Olympia's Tour

1st Young rider classification

2023
1st Brussel-Opwijk
1st Stage 7 Tour de Bretagne
6th Omloop Het Nieuwsblad U23
9th Overall Flanders Tomorrow Tour
10th Memorial Philippe Van Coningsloo
2024
4th Overall ZLM Tour
7th Elfstedenrace

=== Grand Tour general classification results timeline ===
Grand Tour	2024	2025
Giro d'Italia	104	—
Tour de France	—	156
Vuelta a España	—	—

Legend
—	Did not compete
DNF	Did not finish
