= 2025 Unibet Tietema Rockets season =

Unibet Tietema Rockets
- 2025 season
- UCI code: TDT
- Status: UCI ProTeam
- Owner: Bas Tietema, Josse Wester, Devin Van Der Wiel
- Manager: Julia Soek (NED)
- Main sponsor(s): Unibet
- Based: France
- Bicycles: Cannondale

Season victories
- One-day races: 2
- Stage race stages: 1
- Most wins: (Slovakia) Lukáš Kubiš (Belgium) Lander Loockx (France) Adrien Maire (1 win each)

The 2025 season for the Unibet Tietema Rockets team is the team's third season in existence, the second as a UCI ProTeam.

== Team roster ==
All ages are as of 1 January 2025, the first day of the 2025 season.

As of 11 January 2025.

Rider	Date of birth
Joren Bloem (NED)	21 December 1999 (aged 25)
Davide Bomboi (BEL)	27 March 2000 (aged 24)
Martijn Budding (NED)	31 August 1995 (aged 29)
Giovanni Carboni (ITA)	31 August 1995 (aged 29)
Cedrik Bakke Christophersen (NOR)	11 December 2001 (aged 23)
Hartthijs de Vries (NED)	11 July 1996 (aged 28)
Odd Christian Eiking (NOR)	28 December 1994 (aged 30)
Owen Geleijn (NED)	14 January 2001 (aged 23)
Axel Huens (FRA)	5 September 2001 (aged 23)
Baptiste Huyet (FRA)	6 July 2000 (aged 24)
Kevin Inkelaar (NED)	8 July 1997 (aged 27)
Jelle Johannink (NED)	22 October 1996 (aged 28)
Tomáš Kopecký (CZE)	8 April 2000 (aged 24)

Rider	Date of birth
Lukáš Kubiš (SVK)	31 January 2000 (aged 24)
Zeb Kyffin (GBR)	23 February 1998 (aged 26)
Lander Loockx (BEL)	25 April 1997 (aged 27)
Adrien Maire (FRA)	17 November 2000 (aged 24)
Sergio Meris (ITA)	10 March 2001 (aged 23)
Wessel Mouris (NED)	30 December 2002 (aged 22)
Sebastian Nielsen (DEN)	27 August 2000 (aged 24)
Charles Paige (GBR)	7 July 2001 (aged 23)
Abram Stockman (BEL)	31 July 1996 (aged 28)
Andreas Stokbro (DEN)	8 April 1997 (aged 27)
Adam Ťoupalík (CZE)	9 May 1996 (aged 28)
Killian Verschuren (FRA)	20 October 2002 (aged 22)

Riders who joined the team for the 2025 season

Rider	2024 team
Giovanni Carboni	JCL Team Ukyo
Odd Christian Eiking	Uno-X Mobility
Lukáš Kubiš	Elkov–Kasper
Sergio Meris	Team MBH Bank Colpack Ballan
Wessel Mouris	Metec–Solarwatt p/b Mantel
Killian Verschuren	Decathlon–AG2R La Mondiale Development Team

Riders who left the team during or after the 2024 season

Rider	2025 team
Jordy Bouts	Swatt Club
Nicola Conci	Willing Able Racing

== Season victories ==
Date	Race	Competition	Rider	Country	Location	Ref.
23 March	Cholet-Pays de la Loire	UCI Europe Tour	Lukáš Kubiš (SVK)	France	Cholet	
2 April	Paris–Camembert	UCI Europe Tour	Lander Loockx (BEL)	France	Camembert	
2 April	Tour of Hellas, stage 4	UCI Europe Tour	Adrien Maire (FRA)	Greece	Olympic Village	
