= 2025 Alpecin–Deceuninck season =

Alpecin–Deceuninck
- 2025 season
- UCI code: ADC
- Status: UCI WorldTeam
- Manager: Christoph Roodhooft (BEL); Philip Roodhooft (BEL)
- Main sponsor(s): Alpecin; Deceuninck
- Based: Belgium
- Bicycles: Canyon
- Groupset: Shimano

Season victories
- One-day races: 6
- Stage race stages: 10
- Most wins: (Netherlands) Mathieu van der Poel (6)

The 2025 season for the Alpecin–Deceuninck team is the team's 17th season in existence, the third as a UCI WorldTeam.

== Team roster ==
All ages are as of 1 January 2025, the first day of the 2025 season.

As of 5 January 2025.

Rider	Date of birth
Tobias Bayer (AUT)	17 November 1999 (aged 25)
Lars Boven (NED)	13 August 2001 (aged 23)
Ramses Debruyne (BEL)	31 August 2002 (aged 22)
Simon Dehairs (BEL)	4 June 2001 (aged 23)
Tibor Del Grosso (NED)	27 July 2003 (aged 21)
Silvan Dillier (SUI)	3 August 1990 (aged 34)
Sam Gaze (NZL)	12 December 1995 (aged 29)
Robbe Ghys (BEL)	11 January 1997 (aged 27)
Gal Glivar (SLO)	1 May 2002 (aged 22)
Michael Gogl (AUT)	4 November 1993 (aged 31)
Kaden Groves (AUS)	23 December 1998 (aged 26)
Quinten Hermans (BEL)	29 July 1995 (aged 29)
Juri Hollmann (GER)	30 August 1999 (aged 25)
Jimmy Janssens (BEL)	30 May 1989 (aged 35)
Timo Kielich (BEL)	5 August 1999 (aged 25)

Rider	Date of birth
Xandro Meurisse (BEL)	31 January 1992 (aged 32)
Jasper Philipsen (BEL)	2 March 1998 (aged 26)
Edward Planckaert (BEL)	1 February 1995 (aged 29)
Jensen Plowright (AUS)	15 May 2000 (aged 24)
Johan Price-Pejtersen (DEN)	26 May 1999 (aged 25)
Jonas Rickaert (BEL)	7 February 1994 (aged 30)
Oscar Riesebeek (NED)	23 December 1992 (aged 32)
Henri Uhlig (GER)	1 August 2001 (aged 23)
Fabio Van den Bossche (BEL)	21 September 2000 (aged 24)
Mathieu van der Poel (NED)	19 January 1995 (aged 29)
Stan Van Tricht (BEL)	20 September 1999 (aged 25)
Luca Vergallito (ITA)	14 September 1997 (aged 27)
Gianni Vermeersch (BEL)	19 November 1992 (aged 32)
Emiel Verstrynge (BEL)	4 February 2002 (aged 22)

Riders who joined the team for the 2025 season

Rider	2024 team
Ramses Debruyne	Alpecin-Deceuninck Development Team
Simon Dehairs	Alpecin-Deceuninck Development Team
Tibor Del Grosso	Alpecin-Deceuninck Development Team
Gal Glivar	UAE Team Emirates Gen Z
Johan Price-Pejtersen	Bahrain Victorious
Emiel Verstrynge	Alpecin-Deceuninck Development Team

Riders who left the team during or after the 2024 season

Rider	2025 team
Maurice Ballerstedt	Retired
Nicola Conci	XDS Astana
Søren Kragh Andersen	Lidl-Trek
Axel Laurance	Ineos Grenadiers
Senne Leysen	Retired
Jason Osborne	Retired
Ramon Sinkeldam	Retired

== Season victories ==
Date	Race	Competition	Rider	Country	Location	Ref.
2 March	Kuurne–Brussels–Kuurne	UCI ProSeries	Jasper Philipsen (BEL)	Belgium	Kuurne	
4 March	Le Samyn	UCI Europe Tour	Mathieu van der Poel (NED)	Belgium	Dour	
22 March	Milan–San Remo	UCI World Tour	Mathieu van der Poel (NED)	Italy	Sanremo	
28 March	E3 Saxo Classic	UCI World Tour	Mathieu van der Poel (NED)	Belgium	Harelbeke	
13 April	Paris–Roubaix	UCI World Tour	Mathieu van der Poel (NED)	France	Roubaix	
27 April	Presidential Tour of Turkey, stage 1	UCI ProSeries	Simon Dehairs (BEL)	Turkey	Antalya	
28 April	Presidential Tour of Turkey, stage 2	UCI ProSeries	Tibor Del Grosso (NED)	Turkey	Kalkan	
15 May	Giro d'Italia, stage 6	UCI World Tour	Kaden Groves (AUS)	Italy	Naples	
9 June	Antwerp Port Epic	UCI Europe Tour	Timo Kielich (BEL)	Belgium	Antwerp	
19 June	Tour of Belgium, stage 2	UCI ProSeries	Jasper Philipsen (BEL)	Belgium	Putte	
5 July	Tour de France, stage 1	UCI World Tour	Jasper Philipsen (BEL)	France	Lille	
6 July	Tour de France, stage 2	UCI World Tour	Mathieu van der Poel (NED)	France	Boulogne-sur-Mer	
26 July	Tour de France, stage 20	UCI World Tour	Kaden Groves (AUS)	France	Pontarlier	
22 August	Renewi Tour, stage 3	UCI World Tour	Mathieu van der Poel (NED)	Belgium	Geraardsbergen	
23 August	Vuelta a España, stage 1	UCI World Tour	Jasper Philipsen (BEL)	Italy	Novara	
30 August	Vuelta a España, stage 8	UCI World Tour	Jasper Philipsen (BEL)	Spain	Zaragoza	
