= 2025 Presidential Tour of Turkey =

Cycling race

2025 UCI ProSeries

Race details
- Dates: 27 April – 4 May 2025
- Stages: 8
- Distance: 1,147.6 km (713.1 mi)
- Winning time: 23h 44' 52"

Results
Jersey awarded to the overall winner	Winner	Wout Poels (NED)	(XDS Astana Team)
	Second	Harold Martín López (ECU)	(XDS Astana Team)
	Third	Juan Guillermo Martínez (COL)	(Team Picnic–PostNL)
Jersey awarded to the points classification winner	Points	Giovanni Lonardi (ITA)	(Team Polti VisitMalta)
Jersey awarded to the mountains classification winner	Mountains	Wout Poels (NED)	(XDS Astana Team)
Jersey awarded to the sprints classification winner	Sprints	Willie Smit (RSA)	(China Anta–Mentech Cycling Team)
	Team	(Spain) Caja Rural–Seguros RGA	

The 2025 Presidential Cycling Tour of Turkey was a road cycling stage race that took place between 27 April and 4 May 2025 in Turkey. It was the 60th edition of the Presidential Tour of Turkey.

== Teams ==
Three UCI WorldTeams, thirteen UCI ProTeams, and seven UCI Continental teams made up the 23 teams that participated in the race.

UCI WorldTeams

- Alpecin–Deceuninck
- Team Picnic–PostNL
- XDS Astana Team

UCI ProTeams

- Burgos Burpellet BH
- Caja Rural–Seguros RGA
- Equipo Kern Pharma
- Euskaltel–Euskadi
- Lotto
- Team Flanders–Baloise
- Team Novo Nordisk
- Team Polti VisitMalta
- Team Solution Tech–Vini Fantini
- Unibet Tietema Rockets
- Uno-X Mobility
- VF Group–Bardiani–CSF–Faizanè
- Wagner Bazin WB

UCI Continental Teams

- Bike Aid
- China Anta–Mentech Cycling Team
- Istanbul Büyükșehir Belediye Spor Türkiye
- Konya Büyükşehir Belediyespor
- Mazowsze Serce Polski
- Spor Toto Cycling Team
- Terengganu Cycling Team

== Route ==
Stage characteristics and winners
Stage	Date	Course	Distance	Type	Stage winner
1	27 April	Antalya to Antalya	132 km (82 mi)	Flat stage	Simon Dehairs (BEL)
2	28 April	Kemer to Kalkan	167.4 km (104.0 mi)	Hilly stage	Tibor Del Grosso (NED)
3	29 April	Fethiye to Marmaris	175.9 km (109.3 mi)	Hilly stage	Lev Gonov
4	30 April	Marmaris to Akyaka (Kıran)	115.4 km (71.7 mi)	Mountain stage	Wout Poels (NED)
5	1 May	Marmaris to Aydın	151 km (94 mi)	Hilly stage	Stage cancelled
6	2 May	Selçuk to Selçuk (Meryem Ana)	156 km (97 mi)	Medium-mountain stage	Harold Martín López (ECU)
7	3 May	Selçuk to Çeşme	144.2 km (89.6 mi)	Hilly stage	Elia Viviani (ITA)
8	4 May	Çeşme to İzmir	105.7 km (65.7 mi)	Flat stage	Matteo Malucelli (ITA)
Total			1,147.6 km (713.1 mi)		

== Stages ==
=== Stage 1 ===
27 April 2025 — Antalya to Antalya, 132 km (82 mi)

Stage 1 Result
Rank	Rider	Team	Time
1	Simon Dehairs (BEL)	Alpecin–Deceuninck	2h 51' 04"
2	Matteo Malucelli (ITA)	XDS Astana Team	+ 0"
3	Jules Hesters (BEL)	Team Flanders–Baloise	+ 0"
4	Jon Aberasturi (ESP)	Euskaltel–Euskadi	+ 0"
5	Marc Brustenga (ESP)	Equipo Kern Pharma	+ 0"
6	Davide Bomboi (BEL)	Unibet Tietema Rockets	+ 0"
7	Davide Persico (ITA)	Wagner Bazin WB	+ 0"
8	Pierre Barbier (FRA)	Wagner Bazin WB	+ 0"
9	Jakub Mareczko (POL)	Mazowsze Serce Polski	+ 0"
10	Andrea Peron (ITA)	Team Novo Nordisk	+ 0"

General classification after Stage 1
Rank	Rider	Team	Time
1	Simon Dehairs (BEL)	Alpecin–Deceuninck	2h 50' 54"
2	Matteo Malucelli (ITA)	XDS Astana Team	+ 4"
3	Jules Hesters (BEL)	Team Flanders–Baloise	+ 6"
4	Willie Smit (RSA)	China Anta–Mentech Cycling Team	+ 7"
5	Vinzent Dorn (GER)	Bike Aid	+ 8"
6	Konrad Czabok (POL)	Mazowsze Serce Polski	+ 9"
7	Jon Aberasturi (ESP)	Euskaltel–Euskadi	+ 10"
8	Marc Brustenga (ESP)	Equipo Kern Pharma	+ 10"
9	Davide Bomboi (BEL)	Unibet Tietema Rockets	+ 10"
10	Davide Persico (ITA)	Wagner Bazin WB	+ 10"

=== Stage 2 ===
28 April 2025 — Kemer to Kalkan, 167.4 km (104.0 mi)

Stage 2 Result
Rank	Rider	Team	Time
1	Tibor Del Grosso (NED)	Alpecin–Deceuninck	3h 58' 40"
2	Giovanni Lonardi (ITA)	Team Polti VisitMalta	+ 0"
3	Lander Loockx (BEL)	Unibet Tietema Rockets	+ 0"
4	Jon Aberasturi (ESP)	Euskaltel–Euskadi	+ 0"
5	Nicolas Vinokurov (KAZ)	XDS Astana Team	+ 0"
6	Jasper De Buyst (BEL)	Lotto	+ 0"
7	Jonas Geens (BEL)	Team Flanders–Baloise	+ 0"
8	Lev Gonov	XDS Astana Team	+ 0"
9	Giovanni Carboni (ITA)	Unibet Tietema Rockets	+ 0"
10	Andreas Kron (DEN)	Uno-X Mobility	+ 0"

General classification after Stage 2
Rank	Rider	Team	Time
1	Tibor Del Grosso (NED)	Alpecin–Deceuninck	6h 49' 34"
2	Giovanni Lonardi (ITA)	Team Polti VisitMalta	+ 4"
3	Lander Loockx (BEL)	Unibet Tietema Rockets	+ 6"
4	Willie Smit (RSA)	China Anta–Mentech Cycling Team	+ 6"
5	Ahmet Örken (TUR)	Spor Toto Cycling Team	+ 8"
6	Jon Aberasturi (ESP)	Euskaltel–Euskadi	+ 10"
7	Lev Gonov	XDS Astana Team	+ 10"
8	Casper van Uden (NED)	Team Picnic–PostNL	+ 10"
9	Giovanni Carboni (ITA)	Unibet Tietema Rockets	+ 10"
10	Calum Johnston (GBR)	Caja Rural–Seguros RGA	+ 10"

=== Stage 3 ===
29 April 2025 — Fethiye to Marmaris, 175.9 km (109.3 mi)

Stage 3 Result
Rank	Rider	Team	Time
1	Lev Gonov	XDS Astana Team	4h 22' 44"
2	Lander Loockx (BEL)	Unibet Tietema Rockets	+ 0"
3	Tibor Del Grosso (NED)	Alpecin–Deceuninck	+ 0"
4	Giovanni Lonardi (ITA)	Team Polti VisitMalta	+ 0"
5	Andreas Kron (DEN)	Uno-X Mobility	+ 0"
6	Johannes Kulset (NOR)	Uno-X Mobility	+ 0"
7	Igor Chzhan (KAZ)	China Anta–Mentech Cycling Team	+ 0"
8	Giovanni Carboni (ITA)	Unibet Tietema Rockets	+ 0"
9	Julen Arriola-Bengoa (ESP)	Caja Rural–Seguros RGA	+ 0"
10	Filippo Ridolfo (ITA)	Team Novo Nordisk	+ 0"

General classification after Stage 3
Rank	Rider	Team	Time
1	Tibor Del Grosso (NED)	Alpecin–Deceuninck	11h 12' 14"
2	Lev Gonov	XDS Astana Team	+ 4"
3	Lander Loockx (BEL)	Unibet Tietema Rockets	+ 4"
4	Giovanni Lonardi (ITA)	Team Polti VisitMalta	+ 8"
5	Giovanni Carboni (ITA)	Unibet Tietema Rockets	+ 14"
6	Jakub Kaczmarek (POL)	Mazowsze Serce Polski	+ 14"
7	Andreas Kron (DEN)	Uno-X Mobility	+ 14"
8	Calum Johnston (GBR)	Caja Rural–Seguros RGA	+ 14"
9	Kristian Sbaragli (ITA)	Team Solution Tech–Vini Fantini	+ 14"
10	Frank van den Broek (NED)	Team Picnic–PostNL	+ 14"

=== Stage 4 ===
30 April 2025 — Marmaris to Akyaka (Kıran), 115.4 km (71.7 mi)

Stage 4 Result
Rank	Rider	Team	Time
1	Wout Poels (NED)	XDS Astana Team	3h 14' 12"
2	Harold Martín López (ECU)	XDS Astana Team	+ 19"
3	Juan Guillermo Martínez (COL)	Team Picnic–PostNL	+ 22"
4	Frank van den Broek (NED)	Team Picnic–PostNL	+ 29"
5	Abel Balderstone (ESP)	Caja Rural–Seguros RGA	+ 43"
6	Johannes Kulset (NOR)	Uno-X Mobility	+ 51"
7	Jon Agirre (ESP)	Euskaltel–Euskadi	+ 54"
8	Germán Darío Gómez (COL)	Team Polti VisitMalta	+ 1' 03"
9	Adrien Maire (FRA)	Unibet Tietema Rockets	+ 1' 11"
10	Giovanni Carboni (ITA)	Unibet Tietema Rockets	+ 1' 24"

General classification after Stage 4
Rank	Rider	Team	Time
1	Wout Poels (NED)	XDS Astana Team	14h 26' 30"
2	Harold Martín López (ECU)	XDS Astana Team	+ 23"
3	Juan Guillermo Martínez (COL)	Team Picnic–PostNL	+ 28"
4	Frank van den Broek (NED)	Team Picnic–PostNL	+ 39"
5	Abel Balderstone (ESP)	Caja Rural–Seguros RGA	+ 53"
6	Johannes Kulset (NOR)	Uno-X Mobility	+ 1' 01"
7	Jon Agirre (ESP)	Euskaltel–Euskadi	+ 1' 04"
8	Germán Darío Gómez (COL)	Team Polti VisitMalta	+ 1' 13"
9	Adrien Maire (FRA)	Unibet Tietema Rockets	+ 1' 21"
10	Giovanni Carboni (ITA)	Unibet Tietema Rockets	+ 1' 34"

=== Stage 5 ===
1 May 2025 — Marmaris to Aydın, 151 km (94 mi)

Stage 5 was cancelled due to bad weather.

=== Stage 6 ===
2 May 2025 — Selçuk to Selçuk (Meryem Ana), 156 km (97 mi)

Stage 6 Result
Rank	Rider	Team	Time
1	Harold Martín López (ECU)	XDS Astana Team	3h 32' 55"
2	Wout Poels (NED)	XDS Astana Team	+ 3"
3	Johannes Kulset (NOR)	Uno-X Mobility	+ 11"
4	Abel Balderstone (ESP)	Caja Rural–Seguros RGA	+ 13"
5	Giovanni Carboni (ITA)	Unibet Tietema Rockets	+ 21"
6	Juan Guillermo Martínez (COL)	Team Picnic–PostNL	+ 27"
7	Stefan de Bod (RSA)	Terengganu Cycling Team	+ 32"
8	Ibon Ruiz (ESP)	Equipo Kern Pharma	+ 32"
9	Germán Darío Gómez (COL)	Team Polti VisitMalta	+ 32"
10	Mathias Bregnhøj (DEN)	Terengganu Cycling Team	+ 45"

General classification after Stage 6
Rank	Rider	Team	Time
1	Wout Poels (NED)	XDS Astana Team	17h 59' 22"
2	Harold Martín López (ECU)	XDS Astana Team	+ 16"
3	Juan Guillermo Martínez (COL)	Team Picnic–PostNL	+ 58"
4	Abel Balderstone (ESP)	Caja Rural–Seguros RGA	+ 1' 09"
5	Johannes Kulset (NOR)	Uno-X Mobility	+ 1' 11"
6	Germán Darío Gómez (COL)	Team Polti VisitMalta	+ 1' 48"
7	Frank van den Broek (NED)	Team Picnic–PostNL	+ 1' 50"
8	Giovanni Carboni (ITA)	Unibet Tietema Rockets	+ 1' 58"
9	Adrien Maire (FRA)	Unibet Tietema Rockets	+ 2' 09"
10	Ibon Ruiz (ESP)	Equipo Kern Pharma	+ 2' 19"

=== Stage 7 ===
3 May 2025 — Selçuk to Çeşme, 144.2 km (89.6 mi)

Stage 7 Result
Rank	Rider	Team	Time
1	Elia Viviani (ITA)	Lotto	3h 22' 04"
2	Alexander Kristoff (NOR)	Uno-X Mobility	+ 0"
3	Davide Persico (ITA)	Wagner Bazin WB	+ 0"
4	Matteo Malucelli (ITA)	XDS Astana Team	+ 0"
5	Marc Brustenga (ESP)	Equipo Kern Pharma	+ 0"
6	Casper van Uden (NED)	Team Picnic–PostNL	+ 0"
7	Giovanni Lonardi (ITA)	Team Polti VisitMalta	+ 0"
8	Tibor Del Grosso (NED)	Alpecin–Deceuninck	+ 0"
9	Manuel Peñalver (ESP)	Team Polti VisitMalta	+ 0"
10	Jules Hesters (BEL)	Team Flanders–Baloise	+ 0"

General classification after Stage 7
Rank	Rider	Team	Time
1	Wout Poels (NED)	XDS Astana Team	21h 21' 26"
2	Harold Martín López (ECU)	XDS Astana Team	+ 16"
3	Juan Guillermo Martínez (COL)	Team Picnic–PostNL	+ 58"
4	Abel Balderstone (ESP)	Caja Rural–Seguros RGA	+ 1' 09"
5	Johannes Kulset (NOR)	Uno-X Mobility	+ 1' 11"
6	Germán Darío Gómez (COL)	Team Polti VisitMalta	+ 1' 48"
7	Frank van den Broek (NED)	Team Picnic–PostNL	+ 1' 50"
8	Giovanni Carboni (ITA)	Unibet Tietema Rockets	+ 1' 58"
9	Adrien Maire (FRA)	Unibet Tietema Rockets	+ 2' 09"
10	Ibon Ruiz (ESP)	Equipo Kern Pharma	+ 2' 19"

=== Stage 8 ===
4 May 2025 — Çeşme to İzmir, 105.7 km (65.7 mi)

Stage 8 Result
Rank	Rider	Team	Time
1	Matteo Malucelli (ITA)	XDS Astana Team	2h 23' 26"
2	Alexander Kristoff (NOR)	Uno-X Mobility	+ 0"
3	Giovanni Lonardi (ITA)	Team Polti VisitMalta	+ 0"
4	Marc Brustenga (ESP)	Equipo Kern Pharma	+ 0"
5	Simon Dehairs (BEL)	Alpecin–Deceuninck	+ 0"
6	David Martin (ESP)	Burgos Burpellet BH	+ 0"
7	Luca Colnaghi (ITA)	VF Group–Bardiani–CSF–Faizanè	+ 0"
8	Elia Viviani (ITA)	Lotto	+ 0"
9	Attilio Viviani (ITA)	Team Solution Tech–Vini Fantini	+ 0"
10	Casper van Uden (NED)	Team Picnic–PostNL	+ 0"

General classification after Stage 8
Rank	Rider	Team	Time
1	Wout Poels (NED)	XDS Astana Team	23h 44' 52"
2	Harold Martín López (ECU)	XDS Astana Team	+ 16"
3	Juan Guillermo Martínez (COL)	Team Picnic–PostNL	+ 58"
4	Abel Balderstone (ESP)	Caja Rural–Seguros RGA	+ 1' 09"
5	Johannes Kulset (NOR)	Uno-X Mobility	+ 1' 11"
6	Germán Darío Gómez (COL)	Team Polti VisitMalta	+ 1' 48"
7	Frank van den Broek (NED)	Team Picnic–PostNL	+ 1' 50"
8	Giovanni Carboni (ITA)	Unibet Tietema Rockets	+ 1' 58"
9	Adrien Maire (FRA)	Unibet Tietema Rockets	+ 2' 09"
10	Ibon Ruiz (ESP)	Equipo Kern Pharma	+ 2' 19"

== Classification leadership table ==
Classification leadership by stage
Stage	Winner	General classification	Points classification	Mountains classification	Turkish Beauties Sprints classification	Team classification
1	Simon Dehairs	Simon Dehairs	Simon Dehairs	Not awarded	Willie Smit	Team Flanders–Baloise
2	Tibor Del Grosso	Tibor Del Grosso	Jon Aberasturi	Vinzent Dorn	Willie Smit	XDS Astana Team
3	Lev Gonov	Tibor Del Grosso	Giovanni Lonardi	Vinzent Dorn	Willie Smit	Unibet Tietema Rockets
4	Wout Poels	Wout Poels	Giovanni Lonardi	Ahmet Örken	Willie Smit	Euskaltel–Euskadi
5	Stage cancelled	Wout Poels	Giovanni Lonardi	Ahmet Örken	Willie Smit	Euskaltel–Euskadi
6	Harold Martín López	Wout Poels	Johannes Kulset	Wout Poels	Willie Smit	Caja Rural–Seguros RGA
7	Elia Viviani	Wout Poels	Giovanni Lonardi	Wout Poels	Willie Smit	Caja Rural–Seguros RGA
8	Matteo Malucelli	Wout Poels	Giovanni Lonardi	Wout Poels	Willie Smit	Caja Rural–Seguros RGA
Final		Wout Poels	Giovanni Lonardi	Wout Poels	Willie Smit	Caja Rural–Seguros RGA

== Classification standings ==
Legend
General classification	Denotes the winner of the general classification	Mountain classification	Denotes the winner of the mountains classification
Points classification	Denotes the winner of the points classification	Turkish Beauties Sprints classification	Denotes the winner of the Turkish Beauties Sprints classification

=== General classification ===
Final general classification (1–10)
Rank	Rider	Team	Time
1	Wout Poels (NED)	XDS Astana Team	23h 44' 52"
2	Harold Martín López (ECU)	XDS Astana Team	+ 16"
3	Juan Guillermo Martínez (COL)	Team Picnic–PostNL	+ 58"
4	Abel Balderstone (ESP)	Caja Rural–Seguros RGA	+ 1' 09"
5	Johannes Kulset (NOR)	Uno-X Mobility	+ 1' 11"
6	Germán Darío Gómez (COL)	Team Polti VisitMalta	+ 1' 48"
7	Frank van den Broek (NED)	Team Picnic–PostNL	+ 1' 50"
8	Giovanni Carboni (ITA)	Unibet Tietema Rockets	+ 1' 58"
9	Adrien Maire (FRA)	Unibet Tietema Rockets	+ 2' 09"
10	Ibon Ruiz (ESP)	Equipo Kern Pharma	+ 2' 19"

=== Points classification ===
Final points classification (1–10)
Rank	Rider	Team	Points
1	Giovanni Lonardi (ITA)	Team Polti VisitMalta	52
2	Tibor Del Grosso (NED)	Alpecin–Deceuninck	41
3	Matteo Malucelli (ITA)	XDS Astana Team	41
4	Marc Brustenga (ESP)	Equipo Kern Pharma	34
5	Johannes Kulset (NOR)	Uno-X Mobility	33
6	Wout Poels (NED)	XDS Astana Team	32
7	Giovanni Carboni (ITA)	Unibet Tietema Rockets	32
8	Lander Loockx (BEL)	Unibet Tietema Rockets	31
9	Harold Martín López (ECU)	XDS Astana Team	30
10	Jon Aberasturi (ESP)	Euskaltel–Euskadi	29

=== Mountains classification ===
Final mountains classification (1–10)
Rank	Rider	Team	Points
1	Wout Poels (NED)	XDS Astana Team	20
2	Ahmet Örken (TUR)	Spor Toto Cycling Team	18
3	Harold Martín López (ECU)	XDS Astana Team	16
4	Burak Abay (TUR)	Konya Büyükşehir Belediyespor	14
5	Frank van den Broek (NED)	Team Picnic–PostNL	10
6	Johannes Kulset (NOR)	Uno-X Mobility	9
7	Vinzent Dorn (GER)	Bike Aid	9
8	Juan Guillermo Martínez (COL)	Team Picnic–PostNL	9
9	Oliver Mattheis (GER)	Bike Aid	8
10	Mustafa Tekin (TUR)	Spor Toto Cycling Team	7

=== Turkish Beauties Sprints classification ===
Final Turkish Beauties Sprints classification (1–10)
Rank	Rider	Team	Points
1	Willie Smit (RSA)	China Anta–Mentech Cycling Team	14
2	Mustafa Tekin (TUR)	Spor Toto Cycling Team	9
3	Konrad Czabok (POL)	Mazowsze Serce Polski	9
4	Mateusz Gajdulewicz (POL)	Mazowsze Serce Polski	5
5	Vinzent Dorn (GER)	Bike Aid	5
6	Mustafa Tarakci (TUR)	Konya Büyükşehir Belediyespor	5
7	Jonas Rickaert (BEL)	Alpecin–Deceuninck	3
8	Tuur Dens (BEL)	Team Flanders–Baloise	3
9	Oliver Mattheis (GER)	Bike Aid	1
10	Gorka Sorrarain (ESP)	Caja Rural–Seguros RGA	1

=== Team classification ===
Final team classification (1–10)
Rank	Team	Time
1	(Spain) Caja Rural–Seguros RGA	71h 22' 26"
2	(Kazakhstan) XDS Astana Team	+ 1' 22"
3	(Italy) Team Polti VisitMalta	+ 4' 43"
4	(Spain) Euskaltel–Euskadi	+ 5' 22"
5	(Spain) Equipo Kern Pharma	+ 9' 01"
6	(France) Unibet Tietema Rockets	+ 12' 18"
7	(Netherlands) Team Picnic–PostNL	+ 17' 57"
8	(Malaysia) Terengganu Cycling Team	+ 28' 43"
9	(Belgium) Lotto	+ 34' 51"
10	(Norway) Uno-X Mobility	+ 35' 12"
