= Sentjens =

Sentjens is a surname. Notable people with the surname include:

- Roy Sentjens (born 1980), Belgian cyclist, father of Sente
- Sente Sentjens (born 2005), Belgian cyclist, daughter of Roy
