= 2023 Tour of Britain =

2023 UCI ProSeries
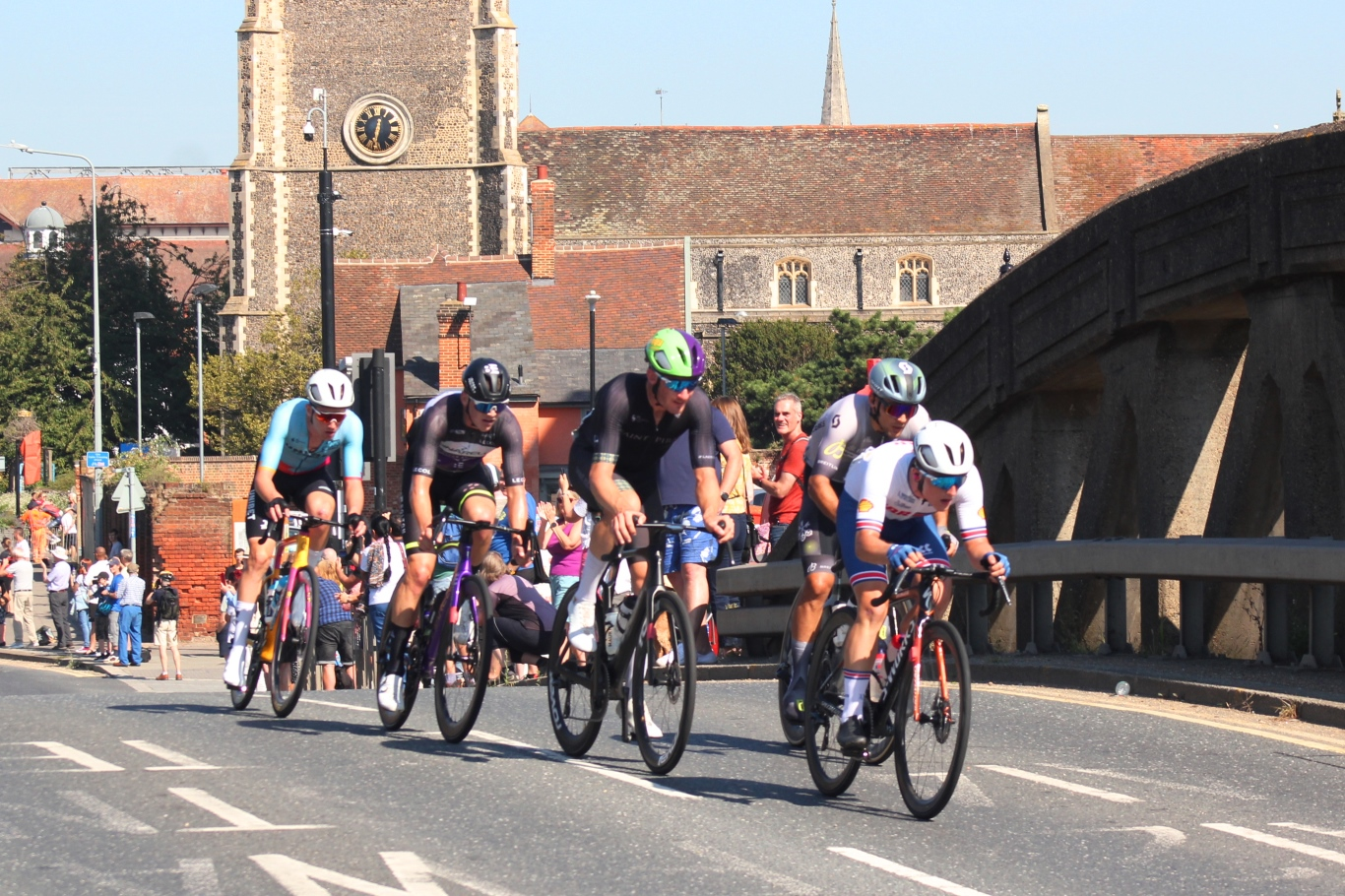
- Stage 5 in Ipswich

Race details
- Dates: 3 – 10 September 2023
- Stages: 8
- Distance: 1,271.1 km (789.8 mi)
- Winning time: 28h 43' 57"

Results
Jersey awarded to the overall winner	Winner	Wout van Aert (BEL)	(Team Jumbo–Visma)
	Second	Tobias Halland Johannessen (NOR)	(Uno-X Pro Cycling Team)
	Third	Damien Howson (AUS)	(Q36.5 Pro Cycling Team)
Jersey awarded to the points classification winner	Points	Olav Kooij (NED)	(Team Jumbo–Visma)
Jersey awarded to the mountains classification winner	Mountains	James Fouché (NZL)	(Bolton Equities Black Spoke)
Jersey awarded to the young rider classification winner	Young rider	Magnus Sheffield (USA)	(INEOS Grenadiers)
Jersey awarded to the combativity classification winner	Combativity	Abram Stockman (BEL)	(TDT–Unibet Cycling Team)
	Team	(Switzerland) Q36.5 Pro Cycling Team	

The 2023 Tour of Britain was a men's professional road cycling stage race. It was the nineteenth running of the modern version of the Tour of Britain and the 82nd British tour in total. The race is part of the 2023 UCI ProSeries.

The Tour of Britain started on 3 September in Manchester and the final stage finished in Caerphilly, Wales on the 10th.

== Teams ==
Five UCI WorldTeams, six UCI ProTeams, four UCI Continental teams, and one national team made up the sixteen teams in the race.

UCI WorldTeams

- Bora–Hansgrohe
- INEOS Grenadiers
- Movistar Team
- Team dsm–firmenich
- Team Jumbo–Visma

UCI ProTeams

- Bolton Equities Black Spoke
- Bingoal WB
- Equipo Kern Pharma
- Q36.5 Pro Cycling Team
- Team Flanders–Baloise
- Uno-X Pro Cycling Team

UCI Continental Teams

- Global 6 Cycling
- Saint Piran
- TDT–Unibet Cycling Team
- Trinity Racing

UCI Continental Teams

- Great Britain

== Schedule ==
Stage characteristics and winners
Stage	Date	Route	Distance	Type	Stage winner
1	3 September	Altrincham to Manchester	163.6 km (101.7 mi)	Hilly stage	Olav Kooij (NED)
2	4 September	Wrexham to Wrexham	109.9 km (68.3 mi)	Flat stage	Olav Kooij (NED)
3	5 September	Goole to Beverley	154.7 km (96.1 mi)	Flat stage	Olav Kooij (NED)
4	6 September	Sherwood Forest to Newark-on-Trent	166.6 km (103.5 mi)	Flat stage	Olav Kooij (NED)
5	7 September	Felixstowe to Felixstowe	192.4 km (119.6 mi)	Flat stage	Wout van Aert (BEL)
6	8 September	Southend-on-Sea to Harlow	146.2 km (90.8 mi)	Flat stage	Danny van Poppel (NED)
7	9 September	Tewkesbury to Gloucester	170.9 km (106.2 mi)	Hilly stage	Rasmus Tiller (NOR)
8	10 September	Margam Country Park to Caerphilly	166.8 km (103.6 mi)	Hilly stage	Carlos Rodríguez (ESP)
Total			1,271.1 km (789.8 mi)		

== Stages ==
=== Stage 1 ===
3 September 2023 – Altrincham to Manchester, 163.6 km (101.7 mi)

Stage 1 Result
Rank	Rider	Team	Time
1	Olav Kooij (NED)	Team Jumbo–Visma	3h 51' 02"
2	Wout van Aert (BEL)	Team Jumbo–Visma	+ 0"
3	Sam Bennett (IRL)	Bora–Hansgrohe	+ 0"
4	Max Kanter (GER)	Movistar Team	+ 0"
5	Ethan Vernon (GBR)	Great Britain	+ 0"
6	Stian Fredheim (NOR)	Uno-X Pro Cycling Team	+ 0"
7	Davide Bomboi (BEL)	TDT–Unibet Cycling Team	+ 0"
8	Danny van Poppel (NED)	Bora–Hansgrohe	+ 0"
9	Gonzalo Serrano (ESP)	Movistar Team	+ 0"
10	Rory Townsend (IRL)	Bolton Equities Black Spoke	+ 0"

General classification after Stage 1
Rank	Rider	Team	Time
1	Olav Kooij (NED)	Team Jumbo–Visma	3h 51' 02"
2	Wout van Aert (BEL)	Team Jumbo–Visma	+ 0"
3	Sam Bennett (IRL)	Bora–Hansgrohe	+ 0"
4	Max Kanter (GER)	Movistar Team	+ 0"
5	Ethan Vernon (GBR)	Great Britain	+ 0"
6	Stian Fredheim (NOR)	Uno-X Pro Cycling Team	+ 0"
7	Davide Bomboi (BEL)	TDT–Unibet Cycling Team	+ 0"
8	Danny van Poppel (NED)	Bora–Hansgrohe	+ 0"
9	Gonzalo Serrano (ESP)	Movistar Team	+ 0"
10	Rory Townsend (IRL)	Bolton Equities Black Spoke	+ 0"

=== Stage 2 ===
4 September 2023 – Wrexham to Wrexham, 109.9 km (68.3 mi)

Stage 2 Result
Rank	Rider	Team	Time
1	Olav Kooij (NED)	Team Jumbo–Visma	2h 22' 51"
2	Danny van Poppel (NED)	Bora–Hansgrohe	+ 0"
3	Wout van Aert (BEL)	Team Jumbo–Visma	+ 0"
4	Sam Bennett (IRL)	Bora–Hansgrohe	+ 0"
5	Max Kanter (GER)	Movistar Team	+ 0"
6	Ethan Vernon (GBR)	Great Britain	+ 0"
7	Luke Lamperti (USA)	Trinity Racing	+ 0"
8	Stian Fredheim (NOR)	Uno-X Pro Cycling Team	+ 0"
9	Tom Pidcock (GBR)	INEOS Grenadiers	+ 0"
10	Davide Bomboi (BEL)	TDT–Unibet Cycling Team	+ 0"

General classification after Stage 2
Rank	Rider	Team	Time
1	Olav Kooij (NED)	Team Jumbo–Visma	6h 13' 53"
2	Wout van Aert (BEL)	Team Jumbo–Visma	+ 0"
3	Sam Bennett (IRL)	Bora–Hansgrohe	+ 0"
4	Max Kanter (GER)	Movistar Team	+ 0"
5	Danny van Poppel (NED)	Bora–Hansgrohe	+ 0"
6	Ethan Vernon (GBR)	Great Britain	+ 0"
7	Stian Fredheim (NOR)	Uno-X Pro Cycling Team	+ 0"
8	Davide Bomboi (BEL)	TDT–Unibet Cycling Team	+ 0"
9	Tom Pidcock (GBR)	INEOS Grenadiers	+ 0"
10	Gonzalo Serrano (ESP)	Movistar Team	+ 0"

=== Stage 3 ===
5 September 2023 – Goole to Beverley, 154.7 km (96.1 mi)

Stage 3 Result
Rank	Rider	Team	Time
1	Olav Kooij (NED)	Team Jumbo–Visma	3h 25' 58"
2	Danny van Poppel (NED)	Bora–Hansgrohe	+ 0"
3	Ethan Vernon (GBR)	Great Britain	+ 0"
4	Max Kanter (GER)	Movistar Team	+ 0"
5	Rasmus Tiller (NOR)	Uno-X Pro Cycling Team	+ 0"
6	Tom Pidcock (GBR)	INEOS Grenadiers	+ 0"
7	Robert Donaldson (GBR)	Trinity Racing	+ 0"
8	Casper van Uden (NED)	Team dsm–firmenich	+ 0"
9	Rory Townsend (IRL)	Bolton Equities Black Spoke	+ 0"
10	Davide Bomboi (BEL)	TDT–Unibet Cycling Team	+ 0"

General classification after Stage 3
Rank	Rider	Team	Time
1	Olav Kooij (NED)	Team Jumbo–Visma	9h 39' 51"
2	Danny van Poppel (NED)	Bora–Hansgrohe	+ 0"
3	Max Kanter (GER)	Movistar Team	+ 0"
4	Ethan Vernon (GBR)	Great Britain	+ 0"
5	Wout van Aert (BEL)	Team Jumbo–Visma	+ 0"
6	Davide Bomboi (BEL)	TDT–Unibet Cycling Team	+ 0"
7	Tom Pidcock (GBR)	INEOS Grenadiers	+ 0"
8	Gonzalo Serrano (ESP)	Movistar Team	+ 0"
9	Rasmus Tiller (NOR)	Uno-X Pro Cycling Team	+ 0"
10	Rory Townsend (IRL)	Bolton Equities Black Spoke	+ 0"

=== Stage 4 ===
6 September 2023 – Sherwood Forest to Newark-on-Trent, 166.6 km (103.5 mi)

Stage 4 Result
Rank	Rider	Team	Time
1	Olav Kooij (NED)	Team Jumbo–Visma	3h 45' 40"
2	Casper van Uden (NED)	Team dsm–firmenich	+ 0"
3	Ethan Vernon (GBR)	Great Britain	+ 0"
4	Milan Fretin (BEL)	Team Flanders–Baloise	+ 0"
5	Max Kanter (GER)	Movistar Team	+ 0"
6	Stian Fredheim (NOR)	Uno-X Pro Cycling Team	+ 0"
7	Davide Persico (ITA)	Bingoal WB	+ 0"
8	Ben Turner (GBR)	INEOS Grenadiers	+ 0"
9	Sam Bennett (IRL)	Bora–Hansgrohe	+ 0"
10	Davide Bomboi (BEL)	TDT–Unibet Cycling Team	+ 0"

General classification after Stage 4
Rank	Rider	Team	Time
1	Olav Kooij (NED)	Team Jumbo–Visma	13h 25' 31"
2	Ethan Vernon (GBR)	Great Britain	+ 0"
3	Max Kanter (GER)	Movistar Team	+ 0"
4	Wout van Aert (BEL)	Team Jumbo–Visma	+ 0"
5	Davide Bomboi (BEL)	TDT–Unibet Cycling Team	+ 0"
6	Danny van Poppel (NED)	Bora–Hansgrohe	+ 0"
7	Tom Pidcock (GBR)	INEOS Grenadiers	+ 0"
8	Casper van Uden (NED)	Team dsm–firmenich	+ 0"
9	Gonzalo Serrano (ESP)	Movistar Team	+ 0"
10	Rory Townsend (IRL)	Bolton Equities Black Spoke	+ 0"

=== Stage 5 ===
7 September 2023 – Felixstowe to Felixstowe, 192.4 km (119.6 mi)

Stage 5 Result
Rank	Rider	Team	Time
1	Wout van Aert (BEL)	Team Jumbo–Visma	4h 20' 05"
2	Ethan Vernon (GBR)	Great Britain	+ 3"
3	Danny van Poppel (NED)	Bora–Hansgrohe	+ 3"
4	Alexander Salby (DEN)	Bingoal WB	+ 3"
5	Max Kanter (GER)	Movistar Team	+ 3"
6	Davide Persico (ITA)	Bingoal WB	+ 3"
7	Milan Fretin (BEL)	Team Flanders–Baloise	+ 3"
8	Davide Bomboi (BEL)	TDT–Unibet Cycling Team	+ 3"
9	Tom Pidcock (GBR)	INEOS Grenadiers	+ 3"
10	Stian Fredheim (NOR)	Uno-X Pro Cycling Team	+ 3"

General classification after Stage 5
Rank	Rider	Team	Time
1	Wout van Aert (BEL)	Team Jumbo–Visma	17h 45' 36"
2	Ethan Vernon (GBR)	Great Britain	+ 3"
3	Max Kanter (GER)	Movistar Team	+ 3"
4	Olav Kooij (NED)	Team Jumbo–Visma	+ 3"
5	Davide Bomboi (BEL)	TDT–Unibet Cycling Team	+ 3"
6	Danny van Poppel (NED)	Bora–Hansgrohe	+ 3"
7	Tom Pidcock (GBR)	INEOS Grenadiers	+ 3"
8	Casper van Uden (NED)	Team dsm–firmenich	+ 3"
9	Gonzalo Serrano (ESP)	Movistar Team	+ 3"
10	Davide Persico (ITA)	Bingoal WB	+ 3"

=== Stage 6 ===
8 September 2023 – Southend-on-Sea to Harlow, 146.2 km (90.8 mi)

Stage 6 Result
Rank	Rider	Team	Time
1	Danny van Poppel (NED)	Bora–Hansgrohe	3h 14' 34"
2	Ethan Vernon (GBR)	Great Britain	+ 0"
3	Tord Gudmestad (NOR)	Uno-X Pro Cycling Team	+ 0"
4	Olav Kooij (NED)	Team Jumbo–Visma	+ 0"
5	Casper van Uden (NED)	Team dsm–firmenich	+ 0"
6	Nicolò Parisini (ITA)	Q36.5 Pro Cycling Team	+ 0"
7	Davide Persico (ITA)	Bingoal WB	+ 0"
8	Robert Donaldson (GBR)	Trinity Racing	+ 0"
9	Tom Pidcock (GBR)	INEOS Grenadiers	+ 0"
10	Szymon Sajnok (POL)	Q36.5 Pro Cycling Team	+ 0"

General classification after Stage 6
Rank	Rider	Team	Time
1	Wout van Aert (BEL)	Team Jumbo–Visma	21h 00' 10"
2	Ethan Vernon (GBR)	Great Britain	+ 3"
3	Olav Kooij (NED)	Team Jumbo–Visma	+ 3"
4	Danny van Poppel (NED)	Bora–Hansgrohe	+ 3"
5	Tom Pidcock (GBR)	INEOS Grenadiers	+ 3"
6	Davide Bomboi (BEL)	TDT–Unibet Cycling Team	+ 3"
7	Casper van Uden (NED)	Team dsm–firmenich	+ 3"
8	Davide Persico (ITA)	Bingoal WB	+ 3"
9	Gonzalo Serrano (ESP)	Movistar Team	+ 3"
10	Max Kanter (GER)	Movistar Team	+ 3"

=== Stage 7 ===
9 September 2023 – Tewkesbury to Gloucester, 170.9 km (106.2 mi)

Stage 7 Result
Rank	Rider	Team	Time
1	Rasmus Tiller (NOR)	Uno-X Pro Cycling Team	3h 50' 53"
2	Danny van Poppel (NED)	Bora–Hansgrohe	+ 0"
3	Stephen Williams (GBR)	Great Britain	+ 0"
4	Gregor Mühlberger (AUT)	Movistar Team	+ 0"
5	Damien Howson (AUS)	Q36.5 Pro Cycling Team	+ 0"
6	Tobias Halland Johannessen (NOR)	Uno-X Pro Cycling Team	+ 0"
7	Zeb Kyffin (GBR)	Saint Piran	+ 0"
8	Magnus Sheffield (USA)	INEOS Grenadiers	+ 0"
9	Liam Johnston (AUS)	Trinity Racing	+ 0"
10	Mark Donovan (GBR)	Q36.5 Pro Cycling Team	+ 0"

General classification after Stage 7
Rank	Rider	Team	Time
1	Wout van Aert (BEL)	Team Jumbo–Visma	24h 51' 03"
2	Danny van Poppel (NED)	Bora–Hansgrohe	+ 3"
3	Rasmus Tiller (NOR)	Uno-X Pro Cycling Team	+ 3"
4	Tobias Halland Johannessen (NOR)	Uno-X Pro Cycling Team	+ 3"
5	Damien Howson (AUS)	Q36.5 Pro Cycling Team	+ 3"
6	Magnus Sheffield (USA)	INEOS Grenadiers	+ 3"
7	Mark Donovan (GBR)	Q36.5 Pro Cycling Team	+ 3"
8	Stephen Williams (GBR)	Great Britain	+ 3"
9	Zeb Kyffin (GBR)	Saint Piran	+ 3"
10	Gregor Mühlberger (AUT)	Movistar Team	+ 3"

=== Stage 8 ===
10 September 2023 – Margam Country Park to Caerphilly, 166.8 km (103.6 mi)

Stage 8 Result
Rank	Rider	Team	Time
1	Carlos Rodríguez (ESP)	INEOS Grenadiers	3h 52' 43"
2	Wout van Aert (BEL)	Team Jumbo–Visma	+ 11"
3	Damien Howson (AUS)	Q36.5 Pro Cycling Team	+ 11"
4	Tobias Halland Johannessen (NOR)	Uno-X Pro Cycling Team	+ 11"
5	Magnus Sheffield (USA)	INEOS Grenadiers	+ 11"
6	Nils Politt (GER)	Bora–Hansgrohe	+ 30"
7	Zeb Kyffin (GBR)	Saint Piran	+ 31"
8	Mark Donovan (GBR)	Q36.5 Pro Cycling Team	+ 31"
9	Gregor Mühlberger (AUT)	Movistar Team	+ 31"
10	Kamiel Bonneu (BEL)	Team Flanders–Baloise	+ 31"

General classification after Stage 8
Rank	Rider	Team	Time
1	Wout van Aert (BEL)	Team Jumbo–Visma	28h 43' 57"
2	Tobias Halland Johannessen (NOR)	Uno-X Pro Cycling Team	+ 3"
3	Damien Howson (AUS)	Q36.5 Pro Cycling Team	+ 3"
4	Magnus Sheffield (USA)	INEOS Grenadiers	+ 3"
5	Mark Donovan (GBR)	Q36.5 Pro Cycling Team	+ 23"
6	Zeb Kyffin (GBR)	Saint Piran	+ 23"
7	Gregor Mühlberger (AUT)	Movistar Team	+ 23"
8	Kamiel Bonneu (BEL)	Team Flanders–Baloise	+ 23"
9	Nils Politt (GER)	Bora–Hansgrohe	+ 28"
10	Carlos Rodríguez (ESP)	INEOS Grenadiers	+ 28"

== Classification leadership table ==
Classification leadership by stage
Stage	Winner	General classification	Points classification	Mountains classification	Young rider classification	Team classification	Combativity award
1	Olav Kooij	Olav Kooij	Olav Kooij	James Fouché	Olav Kooij	Uno-X Pro Cycling Team	Harry Tanfield
2	Olav Kooij	Olav Kooij	Olav Kooij	James Fouché	Olav Kooij	Bora–Hansgrohe	Abram Stockman
3	Olav Kooij	Olav Kooij	Olav Kooij	James Fouché	Olav Kooij	Uno-X Pro Cycling Team	Nícolas Sessler
4	Olav Kooij	Olav Kooij	Olav Kooij	James Fouché	Olav Kooij	Uno-X Pro Cycling Team	Harry Tanfield
5	Wout van Aert	Wout van Aert	Olav Kooij	James Fouché	Olav Kooij	Uno-X Pro Cycling Team	Wout van Aert
6	Danny van Poppel	Wout van Aert	Olav Kooij	James Fouché	Olav Kooij	Uno-X Pro Cycling Team	Abram Stockman
7	Rasmus Tiller	Wout van Aert	Olav Kooij	James Fouché	Magnus Sheffield	Uno-X Pro Cycling Team	Ben Turner
8	Carlos Rodríguez	Wout van Aert	Olav Kooij	James Fouché	Magnus Sheffield	Q36.5 Pro Cycling Team	Stephen Williams
Final		Wout van Aert	Olav Kooij	James Fouché	Magnus Sheffield	Q36.5 Pro Cycling Team	Abram Stockman

== Classification standings ==
Legend
Denotes the winner of the general classification	Denotes the winner of the mountains classification
Denotes the winner of the points classification	Denotes the winner of the young rider classification
Denotes the winner of the combativity award	

=== General classification ===
Final general classification (1–10)
Rank	Rider	Team	Time
1	Wout van Aert (BEL)	Team Jumbo–Visma	28h 43' 57"
2	Tobias Halland Johannessen (NOR)	Uno-X Pro Cycling Team	+ 3"
3	Damien Howson (AUS)	Q36.5 Pro Cycling Team	+ 3"
4	Magnus Sheffield (USA)	INEOS Grenadiers	+ 3"
5	Mark Donovan (GBR)	Q36.5 Pro Cycling Team	+ 23"
6	Zeb Kyffin (GBR)	Saint Piran	+ 23"
7	Gregor Mühlberger (AUT)	Movistar Team	+ 23"
8	Kamiel Bonneu (BEL)	Team Flanders–Baloise	+ 23"
9	Nils Politt (GER)	Bora–Hansgrohe	+ 28"
10	Carlos Rodríguez (ESP)	INEOS Grenadiers	+ 28"

=== Points classification ===
Final points classification (1–10)
Rank	Rider	Team	Points
1	Olav Kooij (NED)	Team Jumbo–Visma	108
2	Danny van Poppel (NED)	Bora–Hansgrohe	94
3	Wout van Aert (BEL)	Team Jumbo–Visma	79
4	Ethan Vernon (GBR)	Great Britain	71
5	Abram Stockman (BEL)	TDT–Unibet Cycling Team	47
6	Casper van Uden (NED)	Team dsm–firmenich	37
7	Rasmus Tiller (NOR)	Uno-X Pro Cycling Team	31
8	Carlos Rodríguez (ESP)	INEOS Grenadiers	25
9	Damien Howson (AUS)	Q36.5 Pro Cycling Team	18
10	James Fouché (NZL)	Bolton Equities Black Spoke	15

=== Mountains classification ===
Final mountains classification (1–10)
Rank	Rider	Team	Points
1	James Fouché (NZL)	Bolton Equities Black Spoke	49
2	Carlos Rodríguez (ESP)	INEOS Grenadiers	30
3	Mark Donovan (GBR)	Q36.5 Pro Cycling Team	28
4	Wout van Aert (BEL)	Team Jumbo–Visma	26
5	Magnus Sheffield (USA)	INEOS Grenadiers	25
6	Abram Stockman (BEL)	TDT–Unibet Cycling Team	22
7	Stephen Williams (GBR)	Great Britain	18
8	Zeb Kyffin (GBR)	Saint Piran	17
9	Jack Rootkin-Gray (GBR)	Saint Piran	15
10	Tobias Halland Johannessen (NOR)	Uno-X Pro Cycling Team	15

=== Young rider classification ===
Final young rider classification (1–10)
Rank	Rider	Team	Time
1	Magnus Sheffield (USA)	INEOS Grenadiers	28h 44' 00"
2	Carlos Rodríguez (ESP)	INEOS Grenadiers	+ 25"
3	Igor Arrieta (ESP)	Equipo Kern Pharma	+ 1' 27"
4	Paul Magnier (FRA)	Trinity Racing	+ 1' 48"
5	Casper van Uden (NED)	Team dsm–firmenich	+ 5' 19"
6	Robert Donaldson (GBR)	Trinity Racing	+ 7' 06"
7	Jack Rootkin-Gray (GBR)	Saint Piran	+ 7' 06"
8	Luke Lamperti (USA)	Trinity Racing	+ 9' 44"
9	Olav Kooij (NED)	Team Jumbo–Visma	+ 13' 54"
10	Evan Russell (CAN)	Global 6 Cycling	+ 14' 20"

=== Team classification ===
Final team classification (1–10)
Rank	Team	Time
1	(Switzerland) Q36.5 Pro Cycling Team	86h 14' 29"
2	(Norway) Uno-X Pro Cycling Team	+ 7"
3	(Spain) Equipo Kern Pharma	+ 1' 21"
4	(United Kingdom) INEOS Grenadiers	+ 2' 03"
5	(Belgium) Bingoal WB	+ 8' 01"
6	(United Kingdom) Trinity Racing	+ 9' 38"
7	(Germany) Bora–Hansgrohe	+ 11' 21"
8	(New Zealand) Global 6 Cycling	+ 11' 43"
9	(United Kingdom) Saint Piran	+ 12' 03"
10	(Belgium) Team Flanders–Baloise	+ 12' 03"
