= Katusha–Alpecin =

Former Russian/Swiss cycling team

Team information
- UCI code: KAT
- Registered: Russia (2009–2016); Switzerland (2017–2019)
- Founded: 2009
- Disbanded: 2019
- Discipline: Road
- Status: UCI ProTeam (2009–2012); UCI Professional Continental (Jan 2013–Feb 2013); UCI WorldTeam (2013–2019)
- Bicycles: Canyon
- Components: SRAM
- Website: Team home page

Key personnel
- General manager: José Azevedo

Team name history
- 2009–2016 2017–2019: Team Katusha; Katusha–Alpecin
Katusha–Alpecin jersey
Jersey

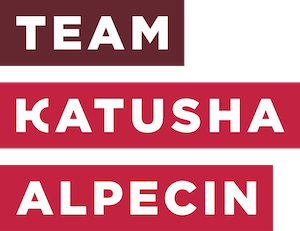
Logo in 2017

Katusha–Alpecin (Russian: Катюша, UCI team code: TKA) was a Russian (later Swiss) road bicycle racing team which competed at the UCI WorldTeam level using Canyon bikes. The team was created in 2008 by Igor Makarov, an ex-professional cyclist and entrepreneur. In 2017 the team took a broader international direction, still supported by Igor Makarov's company ARETI International Group, Swiss clothing company Katusha Sports and German shampoo manufacturer Alpecin. The team competed as a UCI ProTeam/WorldTour team between 2009 and 2019. Joaquim Rodríguez, Alexander Kristoff, Daniel Moreno, Simon Špilak, Filippo Pozzato, Luca Paolini, Ilnur Zakarin and Tony Martin are some of the most successful riders who rode for Katusha.

In 2019, the team was taken over by Israel Cycling Academy, along with its UCI World Tour license.

== History ==
Team Katusha was launched on December 22, 2008 from the acquisition of team Tinkoff Credit Systems. Initially, it relied solely on the financial support of Igor Makarov, who served as its sponsor. This financial backing sustained the team until 2017 when a new partnership was forged with Alpecin, resulting in the co-sponsorship and renaming of the team to Team Katusha-Alpecin.

The director of the team was the retired cyclist Alexei Sivakov that competed on numerous teams including ZG Mobili from 1996 to 1997.

The team was launched with a budget of over €15 million. In its first official season it signed leading cyclists such as Robbie McEwen, Vladimir Karpets, Filippo Pozzato and Gert Steegmans. The team first raced at the 2009 Tour Down Under.

During the 2009 season, the team earned 23 wins. Some of the notable wins were Sergei Ivanov’s Amstel Gold victory, Filippo Pozzato's Italian road title and triumph at Giro del Veneto.

After the 2012 season, Katusha lost their UCI World Tour license, despite having in their ranks the champion of the 2012 season (Joaquim Rodríguez) and finishing the 2012 UCI World Tour team rankings in second position. The team appealed that decision before the Court of Arbitration for Sport and it was announced on 15 February 2013 that the decision of the UCI was overturned and that Katusha would be part of the 2013 UCI World Tour.

Its most successful season was 2015 when the team took victories in the Tour of Flanders, Gent-Wevelgem, Scheldeprijs and GP Ouest France – Plouay, as well as overall wins in the Tour of the Basque Country, Tour de Suisse and Tour de Romandie and stage wins in the Tour de France, Tour of Italy and Tour of Spain.

During the 2017 season, two staff members were videotaped dumping the team RV's septic system in a parking lot off the highway at the Amgen Tour of California. The California Highway Patrol and race organizers were informed of the incident and the waste was later professionally removed. The pair were suspended and sent home from the race.

In October 2019, Israel Cycling Academy completed the takeover of Katusha–Alpecin, including its World Tour license.

== Doping ==
In March 2009, Christian Pfannberger tested positive for EPO and was banned for life. In April of the same year Antonio Colom tested positive for EPO.

In 2011, a number of police searches led by the Padova authorities were conducted in Italy during April. The searches were linked to a broader doping investigation linked to Michele Ferrari. Katusha riders Vladimir Gusev, Mikhail Ignatiev, Vladimir Karpets and Alexandr Kolobnev were searched. Later in July, Kolobnev tested positive for Hydrochlorothiazide (HCT) on stage 5 of the 2011 Tour de France. Two weeks later Kolobnev's B-sample returned a positive for HCT.

In April 2012, Denis Galimzyanov tested positive for EPO in an out of competition test. Galimzyanov later admitted to taking the banned substance. In June 2012 Filippo Pozzato admitted to using the services of Dr Ferrari from 2004 to 2009.

During the 2012 and 2013 seasons, Denis Menchov was on team Katusha, but, on 12 July 2014, was banned from cycling events until 9 April 2015 due to adverse biological passport findings. However, he announced his retirement from cycling on 21 May 2013.

In July 2015, Luca Paolini tested positive for cocaine (Benzoylecgonine metabolite) in a sample given on July 7 during the 2015 Tour de France. As a result, the team withdrew Paolini from the Tour de France. A month later, in August, Giampaolo Caruso returned an EPO positive from a sample taken in March 2012, which had been subsequently retested due to advances in detecting technology. He was suspended by the team awaiting testing of his B-sample.

In February 2016, Eduard Vorganov tested positive for the newly WADA-banned compound Meldonium. Due to the frequency of doping positives, the teams faced a potential 15- to 45-day ban.

== Final roster ==
As of 31 December 2019.

Rider	Date of birth
Enrico Battaglin (ITA)	17 November 1989 (aged 30)
Jenthe Biermans (BEL)	30 October 1995 (aged 24)
Ian Boswell (USA)	7 February 1991 (aged 28)
Steff Cras (BEL)	13 February 1996 (aged 23)
Jens Debusschere (BEL)	28 August 1989 (aged 30)
Alex Dowsett (GBR)	3 October 1988 (aged 31)
Matteo Fabbro (ITA)	10 April 1995 (aged 24)
José Gonçalves (POR)	13 February 1989 (aged 30)
Ruben Guerreiro (POR)	6 July 1994 (aged 25)
Nathan Haas (AUS)	12 March 1989 (aged 30)
Marco Haller (AUT)	1 April 1991 (aged 28)
Reto Hollenstein (SUI)	22 August 1985 (aged 34)

Rider	Date of birth
Pavel Kochetkov (RUS)	7 March 1986 (aged 33)
Vyacheslav Kuznetsov (RUS)	24 June 1989 (aged 30)
Daniel Navarro (ESP)	18 July 1983 (aged 36)
Nils Politt (GER)	6 March 1994 (aged 25)
Willie Smit (RSA)	29 December 1992 (aged 27)
Simon Špilak (SLO)	23 June 1986 (aged 33)
Dmitry Strakhov (RUS)	17 May 1995 (aged 24)
Harry Tanfield (GBR)	17 November 1994 (aged 25)
Mads Würtz Schmidt (DNK)	31 March 1994 (aged 25)
Rick Zabel (GER)	7 December 1993 (aged 26)
Ilnur Zakarin (RUS)	15 September 1989 (aged 30)

== Major wins ==
Since the creation of Team Katusha in 2009, its riders have won many races. As of January 2017, these included 28 stages in Grand Tours and four cycling monuments: the 2012 and 2013 Il Lombardia were won by Joaquim Rodríguez, and the 2014 Milan–San Remo and the 2015 Tour of Flanders were won by Alexander Kristoff.

== Sponsorship ==
In 2019, sponsors Alpecin and Canyon bikes confirmed that they were ending their sponsorship of the team, with Israel Cycling Academy buying the Katusha–Alpecin management company from the ex-professional cyclist, entrepreneur and UCI Management Committee member Igor Makarov.

== National champions ==
2009
Italian Road Race, Filippo Pozzato
Russian Road Race, Sergei Ivanov
2010
Moldovan Road Race, Alexandre Pliuschin
Russian Road Race, Alexandre Kolobnev
Russian Time Trial, Vladimir Gusev
2011
Russian Road Race, Pavel Brutt
Russian Time Trial, Mikhail Ignatiev
Belarusian Road Race, Aleksandr Kuschynski
Moldovan Road Race, Alexandre Pliuschin
2012
Russian Road Race, Eduard Vorganov
Latvian Time Trial, Gatis Smukulis
Russian Time Trial, Denis Menchov
2013
Latvian Time Trial, Gatis Smukulis
Russian Road Race, Vladimir Isaichev
2014
Latvian Time Trial, Gatis Smukulis
Russian Time Trial, Anton Vorobyev
Russian Road Race, Alexander Porsev
2015
Latvian Time Trial, Gatis Smukulis
Russian Road Race, Yuri Trofimov
Austrian Road Race, Marco Haller
2016
Russian Time Trial, Sergey Chernetskiy
Russian Road Race, Pavel Kochetkov
2017
Russian Time Trial, Ilnur Zakarin
German Time Trial, Tony Martin
European Road Race, Alexander Kristoff
2019
British Time Trial, Alex Dowsett
