= Alpecin–Premier Tech Development Team =

Team information
- UCI code: ADD
- Registered: Belgium
- Founded: 2021
- Disciplines: Road; Cyclo-cross
- Status: UCI Continental
- Bicycles: Canyon
- Components: Shimano
- Website: Team home page

Key personnel
- General manager: Philip Roodhooft
- Team managers: Christoph Roodhooft; Kris Wouters; Preben Van Hecke; Luuc Bugter; Dries Hollanders

Team name history
- 2021–July 2022 July 2022–2025 2026–: Alpecin–Fenix Development Team; Alpecin–Deceuninck Development Team; Alpecin–Premier Tech Development Team
Alpecin–Premier Tech Development Team jersey
Jersey

The Alpecin–Premier Tech Development Team is a Belgian UCI Continental cycling team that was founded in 2021. It acts as the development program for UCI WorldTeam Alpecin–Premier Tech.

== Team roster ==
As of 8 September 2026.

Rider	Date of birth
Timo Behrens (GER)	25 September 2001 (age 24)
Rune Boden (BEL)	12 July 2007 (age 19)
Aless De Bock (BEL)	4 July 2006 (age 20)
Thor Feyaerts (BEL)	18 January 2007 (age 19)
Simon Goossens (BEL)	15 September 1999 (age 26)
David Haverdings (NED)	1 April 2004 (age 22)
Cameron Mason (GBR)	18 August 2000 (age 26)
Witse Meeussen (BEL)	8 March 2001 (age 25)
Jente Michels (BEL)	17 February 2003 (age 23)
Noah Ramsay (CAN)	15 December 2002 (age 23)

Rider	Date of birth
Siebe Roesems (BEL)	8 June 2001 (age 25)
William Salter (GBR)	13 August 2006 (age 20)
Laurens Sweeck (BEL)	17 December 1993 (age 32)
Thibaut Van Damme (BEL)	18 September 2007 (age 18)
Guus van den Eijnden (NED)	3 October 2005 (age 20)
Toon Vandebosch (BEL)	19 June 1999 (age 27)
Niels Vandeputte (BEL)	19 September 2000 (age 25)
Nio Vandevorst (BEL)	18 February 2006 (age 20)
Stefano Viezzi (ITA)	5 February 2006 (age 20)
Joran Wyseure (BEL)	9 January 2001 (age 25)

== Major wins ==
2021
Stage 5 Tour of Bulgaria, Timo Kielich
2022
Stage 1 Alpes Isère Tour, Henri Uhlig
Overall Course de Solidarność et des Champions Olympiques, Timo Kielich

Stage 1b, Simon Dehairs
Stage 2, Timo Kielich

Overall Giro della Regione Friuli Venezia Giulia, Emiel Verstrynge
2023
Stage 1 Circuit des Ardennes, Axel Laurance
Stage 5 Tour de Bretagne, Jakub Mareczko
Overall Oberösterreich Rundfahrt, Luca Vergallito

Stages 1 & 2, Timo Kielich
Stage 3, Luca Vergallito

Prologue Tour du Pays de Montbéliard, Marceli Bogusławski
Stage 2 Tour du Pays de Montbéliard, Laurens Sweeck
Stage 4 Course Cycliste de Solidarnosc et des Champions Olympiques, Marceli Bogusławski
Stage 4b (ITT) Sibiu Cycling Tour, Marceli Bogusławski
Stage 4 Tour Alsace, Axel Laurance
Stage 2 Baltic Chain Tour, Henri Uhlig
Belgium National Under-23 Road Race, Simon Dehairs
Stage 3 Giro della Regione Friuli Venezia Giulia, Luca Vergallito
2024
Stage 3 Olympia's Tour, Simon Dehairs
Stages 2 & 4 Tour du Loir-et-Cher, Simon Dehairs
Gran Premio New York City, Tibor Del Grosso
Prologue Oberösterreich Rundfahrt, Tibor Del Grosso
Stage 2 Oberösterreich Rundfahrt, Aaron Dockx
Netherlands National Under-23 Road Race, Tibor Del Grosso
SD Worx BW Classic, Laurens Sweeck
Belgium National Under-23 Road Race, Sente Sentjens
Stage 3 Kreiz Breizh Elites, Niels Vandeputte
Stage 2 Giro della Regione Friuli Venezia Giulia, Aaron Dockx
Grote Prijs Rik Van Looy, Simon Dehairs
Grand Prix Cerami, Sente Sentjens
2025
Youngster Coast Challenge, Sente Sentjens
Omloop van het Waasland, Jensen Plowright
Stage 1a Course de Solidarność et des Champions Olympiques, Sente Sentjens

== National, continental and world champions ==
2023
World U23 Road Race, Axel Laurance
Belgian U23 Road Race, Simon Dehairs
2024
Dutch U23 Road Race, Tibor Del Grosso
Belgian U23 Road Race, Simon Dehairs
