= Youngster Coast Challenge =

Belgian one-day road cycling race

Race details
- Date: March
- Region: West Flanders
- Discipline: Road race
- Competition: UCI Europe Tour
- Type: Single day race

History
- First edition: 2014; 12 years ago
- Editions: 11 (as of 2026)
- First winner: Rob Leemans (BEL)
- Most wins: No repeat winners
- Most recent: Eliott Boulet (FRA)

The Youngster Coast Challenge, formerly known as the Handzame Challenge, is a one-day road cycling race held annually in West Flanders, Belgium. Since 2019, it has been a 1.2U rated event on the UCI Europe Tour, meaning it is reserved for U23 riders. It is the under-23 edition of the Bredene Koksijde Classic, and is held on the same day.

== Winners ==
| Year | Country | Rider | Team |
|---|---|---|---|
| 2014 | Belgium | Rob Leemans | Lotto–Belisol U23 |
| 2015 | Belgium | Julien Kaise | Color Code–Aquality Protect |
| 2016 | Netherlands | Bram Welten | BMC Development Team |
| 2017 | Belgium | Franklin Six | AGO–Aqua Service |
| 2018 | Belgium | Sasha Weemaes | EFC–L&R–Vulsteke |
| 2019 | Germany | Niklas Märkl | Development Team Sunweb |
| 2020–2021 | No race due to the COVID-19 pandemic | | |
| 2022 | Australia | Jensen Plowright | Équipe Continentale Groupama–FDJ |
| 2023 | Belgium | Warre Vangheluwe | Soudal–Quick-Step Devo Team |
| 2024 | Germany | Niklas Behrens | Lidl–Trek Future Racing |
| 2025 | Belgium | Sente Sentjens | Alpecin–Deceuninck Development Team |
| 2026 | France | Eliott Boulet | Groupama–FDJ United Continental Team |
