= Mark Donovan (cyclist) =

British cyclist (born 1999)

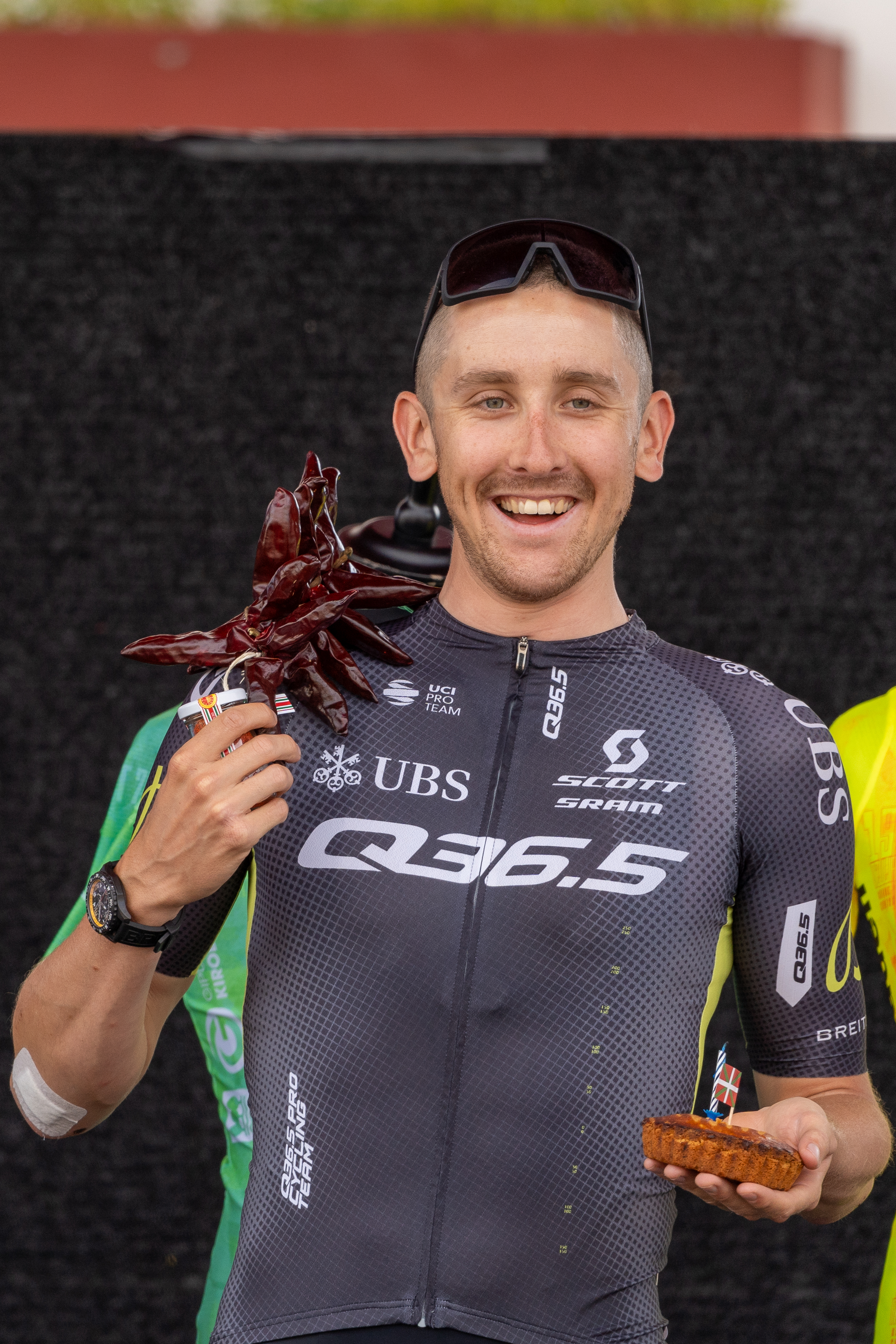
- Donovan at the 2024 Tour of the Basque Country

Personal information
- Full name: Mark Jamie Donovan
- Born: 3 April 1999 (age 27) Penrith, England
- Height: 1.86 m (6 ft 1 in)
- Weight: 70 kg (154 lb)

Cycling career
- Sport: Cycling
- Current team: Pinarello–Q36.5 Pro Cycling Team
- Discipline: Road
- Role: Rider

Amateur teams
- 2017: Zappi's
- 2018: Team Sky (stagiaire)

Professional teams
- 2018–2019: WIGGINS
- 2020–2022: Team Sunweb
- 2023–: Q36.5 Pro Cycling Team

Mark Jamie Donovan (born 3 April 1999) is a British cyclist, who currently rides for UCI ProTeam Pinarello–Q36.5 Pro Cycling Team.

== Personal life ==
Donovan was educated at Keswick School in Cumbria.

== Career ==
=== Early years ===
Donovan started racing Cyclo-Cross as an under 16 rider and then a junior after having to quit running due to injury. It wasn't until he moved to Girona in 2017 that he focused more on road cycling by joining the Zapi cycling team. In 2018 he finished fourth behind João Almeida and Aleksandr Vlasov in the Giro Ciclistico d'Italia, the Under-23 version of the Giro d'Italia. After a successful first year at Wiggins, in 2019 Donovan was made co-leader of the team.

=== Team Sunweb (2020 to 2022) ===
After two years with Team Wiggins Le Col Donovan joined Team Sunweb on a three-year contract. In October 2020, he was named in the startlist for the 2020 Vuelta a España. At the Vuelta he finished in the top 5 in two stages.

=== Q36.5 Pro Cycling (2023 to present) ===
Donovan joined the newly formed UCI ProTeam Q36.5 Pro Cycling Team for the 2023 season. He took the overall victory at the 2023 Sibiu Cycling Tour, the first general classification win for both him and the team. He also finished fifth overall at the 2023 Tour of Britain.

== Major results ==
=== Cyclo-cross ===
2015–2016
1st National Junior Championships
2016–2017
Junior National Trophy Series

3rd Derby

=== Road ===
2017
1st Overall Giro di Basilicata

1st Points classification
1st Stage 3

1st Overall Aubel–Thimister–La Gleize

1st Stage 2a (TTT)

1st Mountains classification, Driedaagse van Axel
5th Overall Ronde des Vallées
2018
1st Stage 2 Giro della Valle d'Aosta
4th Overall Giro Ciclistico d'Italia
6th Overall Volta ao Alentejo
7th Overall Tour Alsace
2021
9th Overall Tour of Britain
2023 (1 pro win)
1st Overall Sibiu Cycling Tour
5th Overall Tour of Britain
5th Overall Giro di Sicilia
2024
4th Overall Tour of Britain
8th Overall Czech Tour
10th Overall Sibiu Cycling Tour
2025
2nd Overall Settimana Internazionale di Coppi e Bartali
2nd Muur Classic Geraardsbergen
6th Vuelta a Castilla y León
2026
3rd Overall Sibiu Cycling Tour
9th Overall Tour of Britain

==== Grand Tour general classification results timeline ====
Grand Tour	2020	2021	2022	2023	2024	2025	2026
Giro d'Italia	—	—	—	—	—	55	38
Tour de France	—	45	—	—	—	—	—
Vuelta a España	48	—	DNF	—	—	—	

Legend
—	Did not compete
DNF	Did not finish
