= Juan Guillermo Martínez =

Colombian cyclist (born 2004)

- Martínez at the 2025 Tour de Pologne

Personal information
- Full name: Juan Guillermo Martínez Huertas
- Born: 21 November 2004 (age 21) Úmbita, Colombia
- Height: 1.72 m (5 ft 8 in)

Cycling career
- Sport: Cycling
- Current team: Team Picnic–PostNL
- Discipline: Road
- Role: Rider
- Rider type: Climber

Amateur teams
- 2021: Gero-Tibano-Jenesano
- 2022: Team Tibaná

Professional teams
- 2023–2024: Q36.5 Continental Team
- 2025–: Team Picnic–PostNL

Juan Guillermo Martínez Huertas (born 21 November 2004) is a Colombian road racing cyclist who currently rides for UCI WorldTeam Team Picnic–PostNL .

== Career ==
From Úmbita in Colombia, he trained in the Boyacá Race of Champions Program and rode with Team Tibaná in 2022. In that year, he was the runner-up of the Vuelta del Porvenir, won the Clásica de Anapoima and the Clásica de Aguazul.

He rode in 2023 and 2024 with UCI Continental team Q36.5 Continental Team. With Q36.5 he won the Bassano-Monte Grappa and finished 6th overall at the Giro della Valle d'Aosta. He was signed for the 2025 season by for UCI WorldTeam Team Picnic–PostNL.

== Major results ==
2024
1st Bassano-Monte Grappa
6th Overall Giro della Valle d'Aosta

1st Mountains classification

2025
3rd Overall Tour of Turkey
8th Overall Tour du Rwanda

=== Grand Tour general classification results timeline ===
| Grand Tour | 2025 |
|---|---|
| Giro d'Italia | — |
| Tour de France | — |
| Vuelta a España | 54 |
