= Alpecin =

German shampoo brand

- Product type: Hair care
- Current owner: Dr. Wolff Group
- Country: Germany
- Introduced: 1930
- Markets: Worldwide (more than 40 countries)
- Ambassadors: Mathieu van der Poel; Jasper Philipsen; Kim Min-jae
- Tagline: "German engineering for your hair" "Doping for hair"
- Website: alpecin.com

Alpecin is a German shampoo brand established in 1905 that is made specifically for men. Its manufacturer has claimed that the caffeine present in the formulation can help to reduce hair loss.

From March 2018, the company was no longer allowed to state in the UK that it "helps reduce hair loss" in their advertisements due to a decision made by the Advertising Standards Authority. The Authority adjudicated that the claim was misleading due to a lack of adequate scientific evidence to support it.

The company had provided eight full studies, several study summaries and a consumer opinion survey but the Authority deemed this information to be inadequate. The manufacturer's website, which publishes the studies, notes that "Nevertheless DR. KURT WOLFF GMBH & CO. KG cannot guarantee the correctness and accuracy of the information contained therein."

In 2019, the International Journal of Cosmetic Science released study that determined "caffeine is the most studied phytochemical for hair loss and the various caffeine studies reported offer reasonable evidence that, when dosed adequately, caffeine will become present in the HF at levels that support its biological activities and over a sufficient period of time, could result in ameliorated hair loss in some patients".

The brand has sponsored a number of professional cycling teams. They sponsored Team Giant–Alpecin for two years from 2015, followed by Team Katusha–Alpecin from 2017 to 2019. The latter team were taken over by Israel Cycling Academy before the 2020 season. Following this, in January 2020 it was announced that they would sponsor Alpecin–Fenix (formerly known as Corendon–Circus) for the new season. Currently they sponsor Alpecin–Premier Tech.
