= Killian Verschuren =

French cyclist (born 2002)

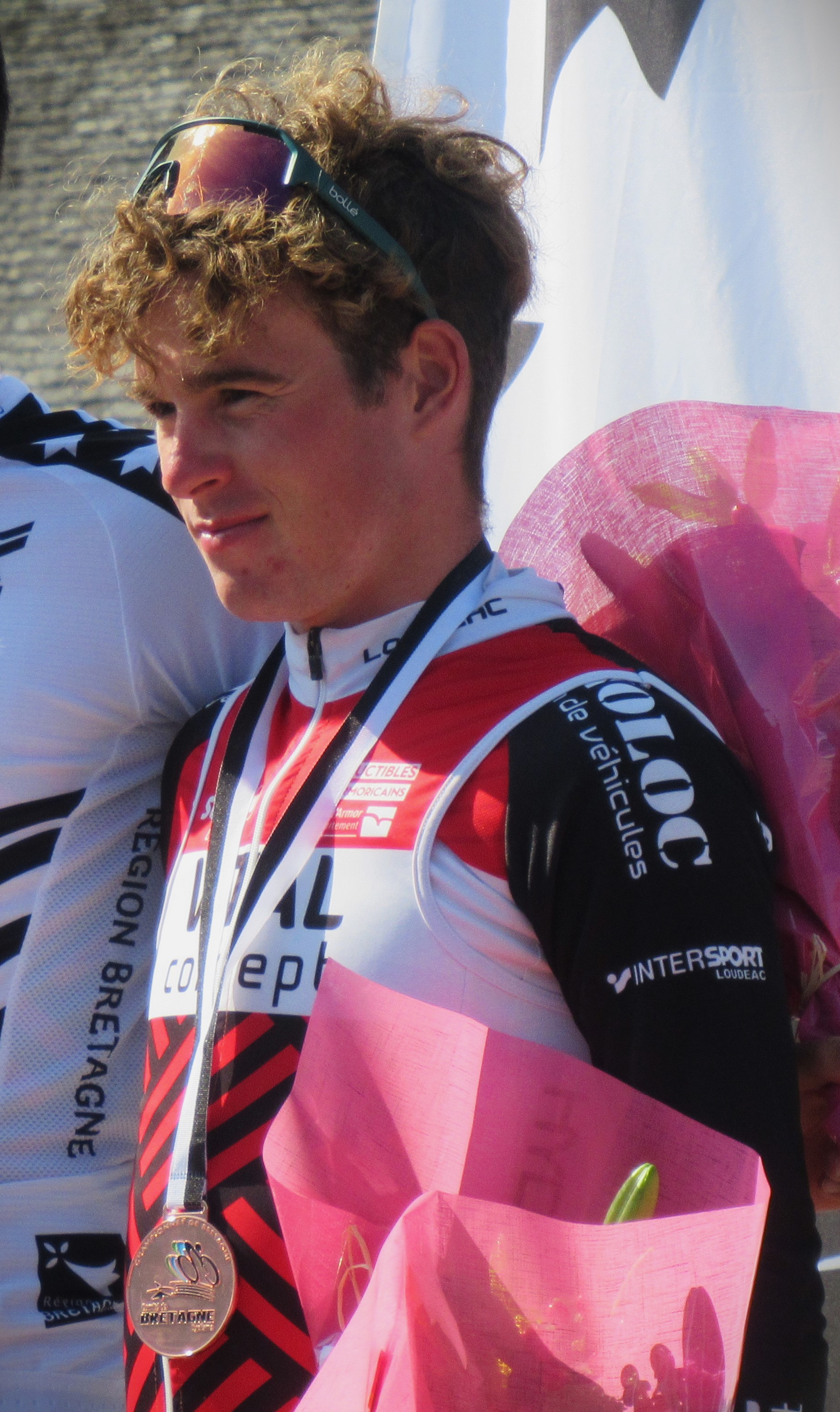
- Verschuren in 2023

Personal information
- Born: 20 October 2002 (age 23) Aurillac, France
- Height: 1.65 m (5 ft 5 in)
- Weight: 54 kg (119 lb)

Cycling career
- Sport: Cycling
- Current team: Unibet Rose Rockets
- Discipline: Road
- Role: Rider

Amateur teams
- 2021: CIC U Nantes Atlantique
- 2022–2023: VC Pays de Loudéac

Professional teams
- 2023: AG2R Citroën Team (stagiaire)
- 2024: Decathlon–AG2R La Mondiale Development Team
- 2025–: Unibet Tietema Rockets

Killian Verschuren (born 20 October 2002) is a French road cyclist, who rides for UCI ProTeam Unibet Rose Rockets.

== Major results ==
2019
5th Road race, National Junior Road Championships
2020
2nd Overall Ronde des Vallées
2023
1st Road race, National Amateur Road Championships
3rd Manche-Atlantique
3rd Tour du Gévaudan
3rd Tour du Périgord
6th Overall Tour Nivernais Morvan
8th Overall Essor Breton
9th Flèche du Locminé
9th Grand Prix de Fougères
10th Grand Prix du Pays d'Aix
2024
1st Young rider classification, Tour de l'Ain
4th Overall Alpes Isère Tour

1st Stage 2

9th Overall Tour de Bretagne
2025
10th Clásica Terres de l'Ebre
