= Kim Min-jae =

Kim Min-jae (김민재) may refer to:

- Kim Min-jae (baseball) (1973–2026), South Korean third base coach for the Hanwha Eagles and shortstop
- Kim Min-jae (actor, born 1979), South Korean actor
- Kim Min-jae (weightlifter) (born 1983), South Korean weightlifter
- Kim Min-jae (actor, born 1996), South Korean actor
- Kim Min-jae (footballer) (born 1996), South Korean footballer

== See also ==
- Kim Min-je (김민제; born 1989), South Korean footballer
