= Simon Dehairs =

Belgian cyclist

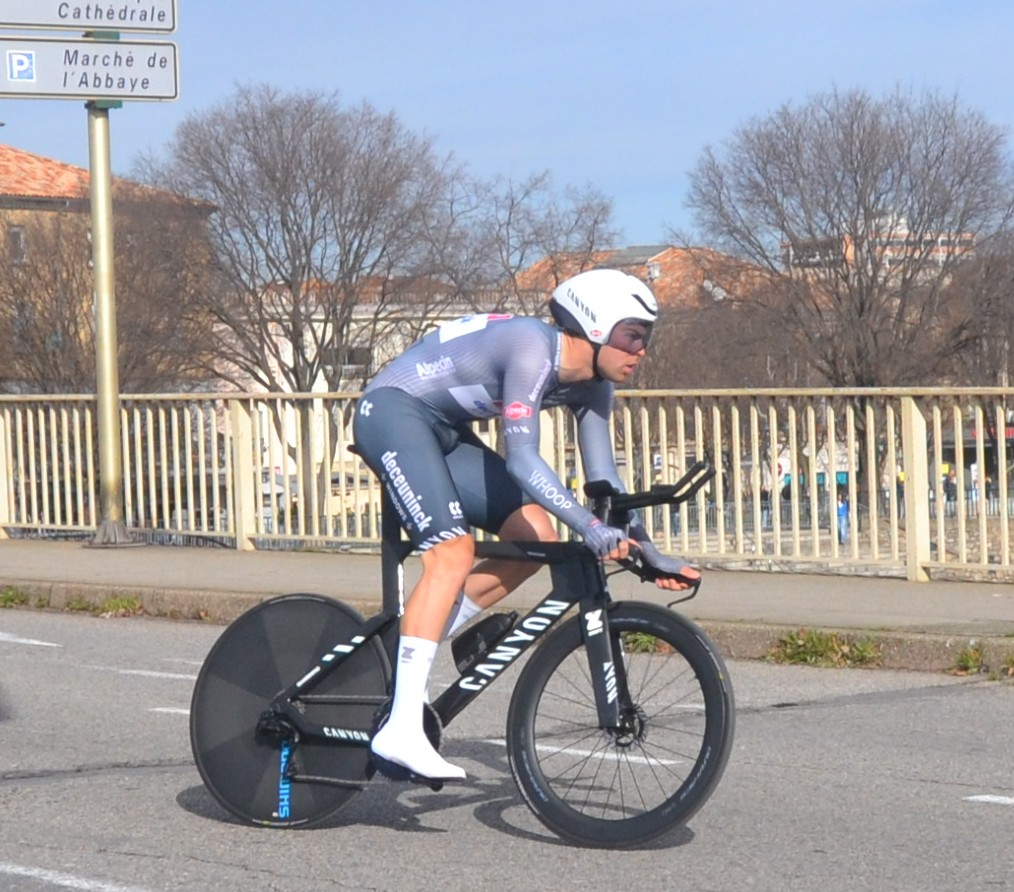

Personal information
- Born: 4 June 2001 (age 25) Tienen, Belgium
- Height: 1.92 m (6 ft 4 in)
- Weight: 82 kg (181 lb)

Cycling career
- Sport: Cycling
- Current team: Alpecin–Premier Tech
- Discipline: Road
- Role: Rider
- Rider type: Sprinter

Amateur teams
- 2018: Wim Ruelens Olympia Tienen
- 2019: Brain² Olympia Tienen
- 2020: GM Recycling Team
- 2021: Basso Team Flanders

Professional teams
- 2021–2024: Alpecin–Fenix Development Team
- 2025–: Alpecin–Deceuninck

Simon Dehairs (born 2 June 2001) is a Belgian cyclist, who currently rides for UCI WorldTeam Alpecin–Premier Tech. A sprinter, Dehairs is the 2023 Belgian Under-23 Road Race Champion, and has won stages of several Continental level races, including the Tour du Loir-et-Cher and Olympia's Tour.

== Biography ==
In his youth, Dehairs played football for a club in Zoutleeuw. He eventually turned to cycling from 2016 in the beginners category (under 17 years old), following in the footsteps of his father Koen, who was an amateur cyclist.

In 2019, he finished second in the Belgian National Road Race Championships for juniors (under 19). In the same year, he was selected for the national team for the European Junior Road Championships, where he finished 38th in the road race. He then joined the Flemish club GM Recycling in 2020, while studying sports science at the KU Leuven. A strong sprinter, he quickly distinguished himself by taking third place in the Belgian National Road Race Championships for under-23s.

In 2021, he was recruited mid-season by the development team of the professional team Alpecin-Fenix, with whom he signed a two-and-a-half-year contract. In 2022, he won a stage of the Course de Solidarność et des Champions Olympiques. He also won a stage of the Ronde van Vlaams-Brabant.

== Major results ==
2019
2nd Road race, National Junior Road Championships
9th E3 BinckBank Classic Junioren
2020
3rd Road race, National Under-23 Road Championships
2022
Course de Solidarność et des Champions Olympiques

1st Points classification
1st Stage 1b

1st Stage 2 Ronde van Vlaams-Brabant
2023
1st Road race, National Under-23 Road Championships
1st Puivelde Koerse
7th Gullegem Koerse
8th Grand Prix d'Isbergues
2024
1st Grote Prijs Rik Van Looy
1st GP Vermarc
Tour du Loir-et-Cher

1st Points classification
1st Stages 2 & 4

1st Stage 3 Olympia's Tour
2nd Veenendaal–Veenendaal
2nd Ster van Zwolle
4th Elfstedenronde
7th Ronde van Limburg
7th Heistse Pijl
8th Elfstedenrace
9th Grand Prix de Denain
2025 (1 pro win)
1st Stage 1 Tour of Turkey
2nd Ronde van Limburg
