= Adrien Maire =

French cyclist

Personal information
- Born: 17 November 2000 (age 25) Nice, France

Cycling career
- Sport: Cycling
- Current team: Unibet Rose Rockets
- Discipline: Road
- Role: Rider
- Rider type: Climber

Amateur teams
- 2017–2018: Cavigal Nice sports
- 2019–2023: AVC Aix-en-Provence

Professional team
- 2024–: TDT–Unibet Cycling Team

Adrien Maire (born 17 November 2000) is a French road cyclist, who rides for UCI ProTeam Unibet Rose Rockets.

== Major results ==
2021
6th Trofeo Città di San Vendemiano
2022
6th GP Capodarco
2023
1st Overall Volta a la Provincia de València

1st Points classification

1st Overall Vuelta a Extremadura

1st Stage 5

10th Overall Tour de la Mirabelle
2024
1st Overall Oberösterreich Rundfahrt

1st Stage 3

6th Overall Tour of Austria
2025 (1 pro win)
2nd Tour du Doubs
3rd Overall Tour of Hellas

1st Stage 4

9th Overall Tour of Turkey
