= Giovanni Carboni =

Italian cyclist (born 1995)

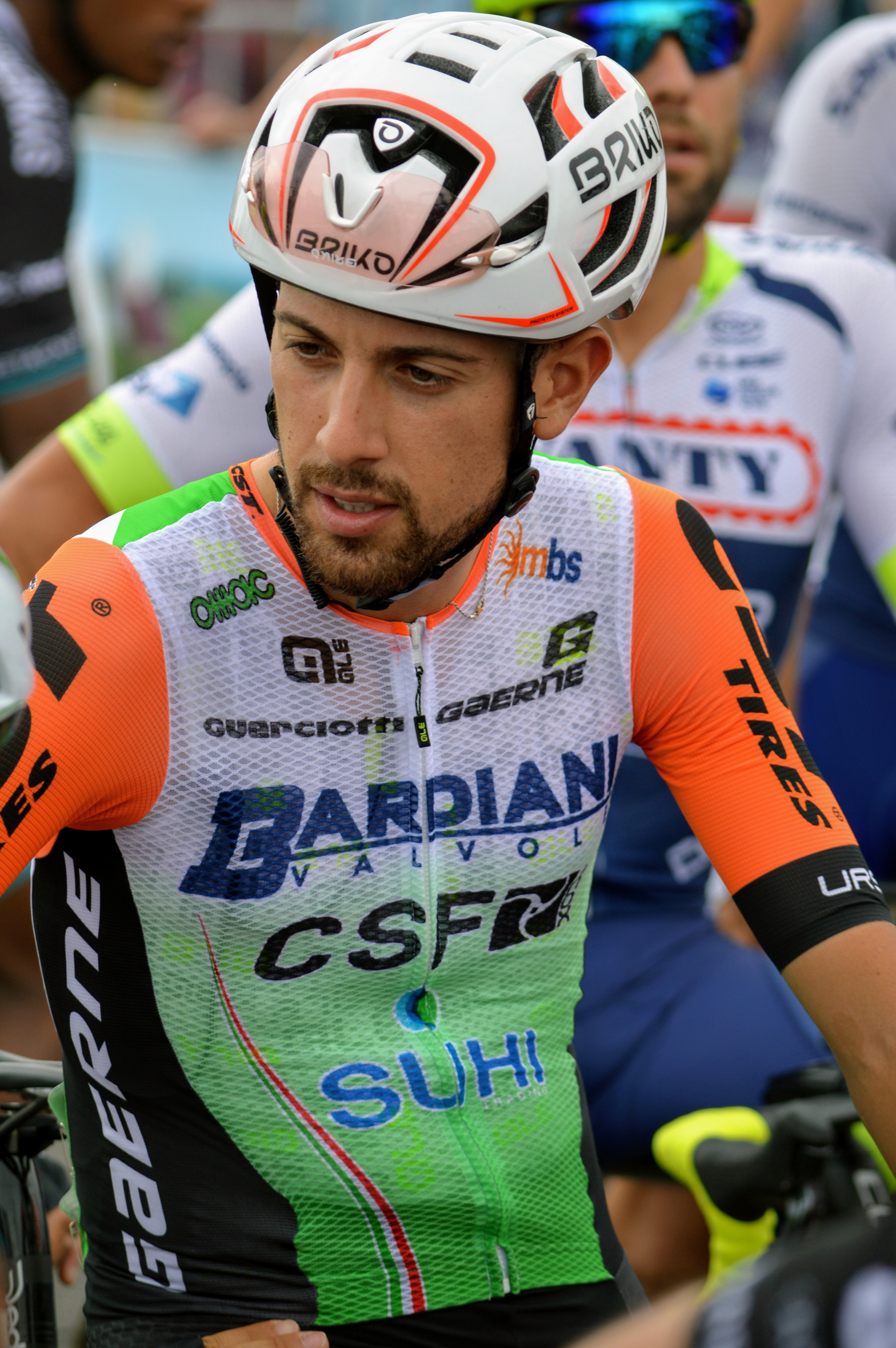
- Carboni at the 2019 Tour Poitou-Charentes en Nouvelle-Aquitaine

Personal information
- Born: 31 August 1995 (age 31) Fano, Italy
- Height: 1.8 m (5 ft 11 in)
- Weight: 61 kg (134 lb)

Cycling career
- Sport: Cycling
- Current team: Unibet Rose Rockets
- Discipline: Road
- Role: Rider
- Rider type: All-rounder

Amateur team
- 2017: Team Colpack

Professional teams
- 2014: Area Zero Pro Team
- 2015–2016: Unieuro–Wilier
- 2018–2021: Bardiani–CSF
- 2022: Gazprom–RusVelo
- 2022–2023: Equipo Kern Pharma
- 2024: JCL Team UKYO
- 2025: Unibet Tietema Rockets

Giovanni Carboni (born 31 August 1995) is an Italian cyclist, who last rode for UCI ProTeam Unibet Rose Rockets. In September 2025, Carboni was provisionally suspended for 'unexplained abnormalities' in his Biological Passport dating back to 2024.

== Major results ==
2013
2nd Time trial, National Junior Road Championships
2015
1st Young rider classification, Sibiu Cycling Tour
2nd Time trial, National Under-23 Road Championships
10th Time trial, UEC European Under-23 Road Championships
2016
2nd Time trial, National Under-23 Road Championships
5th GP Capodarco
6th Overall Tour d'Azerbaïdjan
6th Overall Ronde de l'Isard
7th Overall Course de la Paix U23
2017
5th Overall Giro della Valle d'Aosta

1st Stage 1

7th Giro del Medio Brenta
9th Trofeo Banca Popolare di Vicenza
2018
7th Overall Adriatica Ionica Race
8th Overall Tour of Austria
2019
6th Overall Route d'Occitanie
6th Gran Premio di Lugano
Giro d'Italia

Held after Stages 6–8

2021
4th Overall Adriatica Ionica Race
8th Overall Tour of Slovenia
2022 (1 pro win)
1st Stage 3 Adriatica Ionica Race
2023
5th Overall Volta ao Alentejo
2024
1st Overall Tour of Japan

1st Stages 3 & 6

2nd Overall Tour of Bulgaria

1st Stage 2

4th Giro della Romagna
6th Trofeo Matteotti
9th Overall Settimana Internazionale di Coppi e Bartali
9th Overall Giro d'Abruzzo
10th GP Industria & Artigianato di Larciano
2025
1st Mountains classification, International Tour of Hellas
5th Trofeo Laigueglia
7th Overall Settimana Internazionale di Coppi e Bartali
8th Overall Tour of Turkey

=== Grand Tour general classification results timeline ===
Grand Tour	2019	2020	2021
Giro d'Italia	57	82	35
Tour de France	—	—	—
Vuelta a España	—	—	—
