= Sente Sentjens =

Belgian cyclist

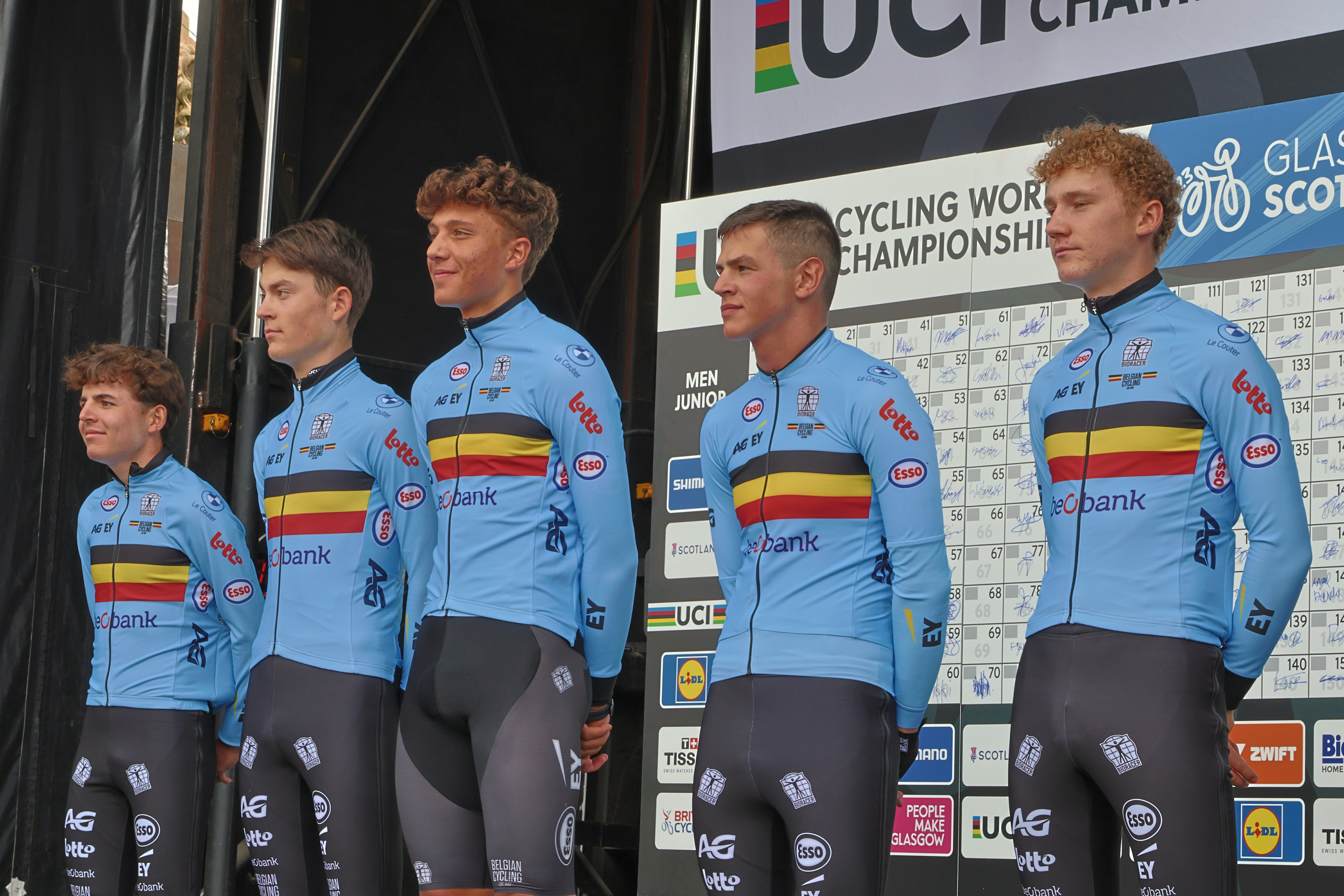
- Sentjens (middle) at the 2023 UCI Road World Championships

Personal information
- Born: 2 September 2005 (age 21) Neerpelt, Belgium
- Height: 1.91 m (6 ft 3 in)

Cycling career
- Sport: Cycling
- Current team: Alpecin–Premier Tech
- Discipline: Road
- Role: Rider

Amateur team
- 2022–2023: Acrog–Tormans BC U19

Professional teams
- 2024–2025: Alpecin–Deceuninck Development Team
- 2026–: Alpecin–Premier Tech
Medal record
Representing Belgium
Men's road bicycle racing
European Championships
Bronze medal – third place	2023 Drenthe	Junior time trial

Sente Sentjens (born 2 September 2005) is a Belgian cyclist, who currently rides for UCI WorldTeam Alpecin–Premier Tech. His father Roy also competed as a professional cyclist.

== Major results ==
2022
1st Kuurne–Brussels–Kuurne Juniors
1st Omloop der 3 Provincies
1st Young rider classification, Vuelta al Besaya
4th E3 Saxo Bank Classic Juniors
8th La Route des Géants
10th Overall Junioren Rundfahrt
2023
1st Overall Tour de Gironde

1st Points classification
1st Stages 1 (ITT) & 2

1st Overall Vuelta Junior a la Ribera del Duero

1st Sprints classification
1st Stage 2a (TTT)

2nd Overall Sint-Martinusprijs Kontich

1st Points classification
1st Stage 5

1st E3 Saxo Bank Classic Juniors
1st Omloop van Valkenswaard Juniors
1st Stage 3 (TTT) Vuelta al Besaya
3rd Time trial, UEC European Junior Championships
3rd Gent–Wevelgem Juniors
National Junior Road Championships

4th Road race
5th Time trial

4th Overall Guido Reybrouck Classic
6th Overall Trophée Centre Morbihan
6th Nokere Koerse Juniors
9th Liège–Bastogne–Liège Juniors
2024
1st Road race, National Under-23 Road Championships
1st Grand Prix Cerami
5th Omloop van het Houtland
6th Overall Course de Solidarność et des Champions Olympiques
6th Paris–Chauny
7th Youngster Coast Challenge
9th Dorpenomloop Rucphen
2025
1st Youngster Coast Challenge
