= Lander Loockx =

Belgian cyclist

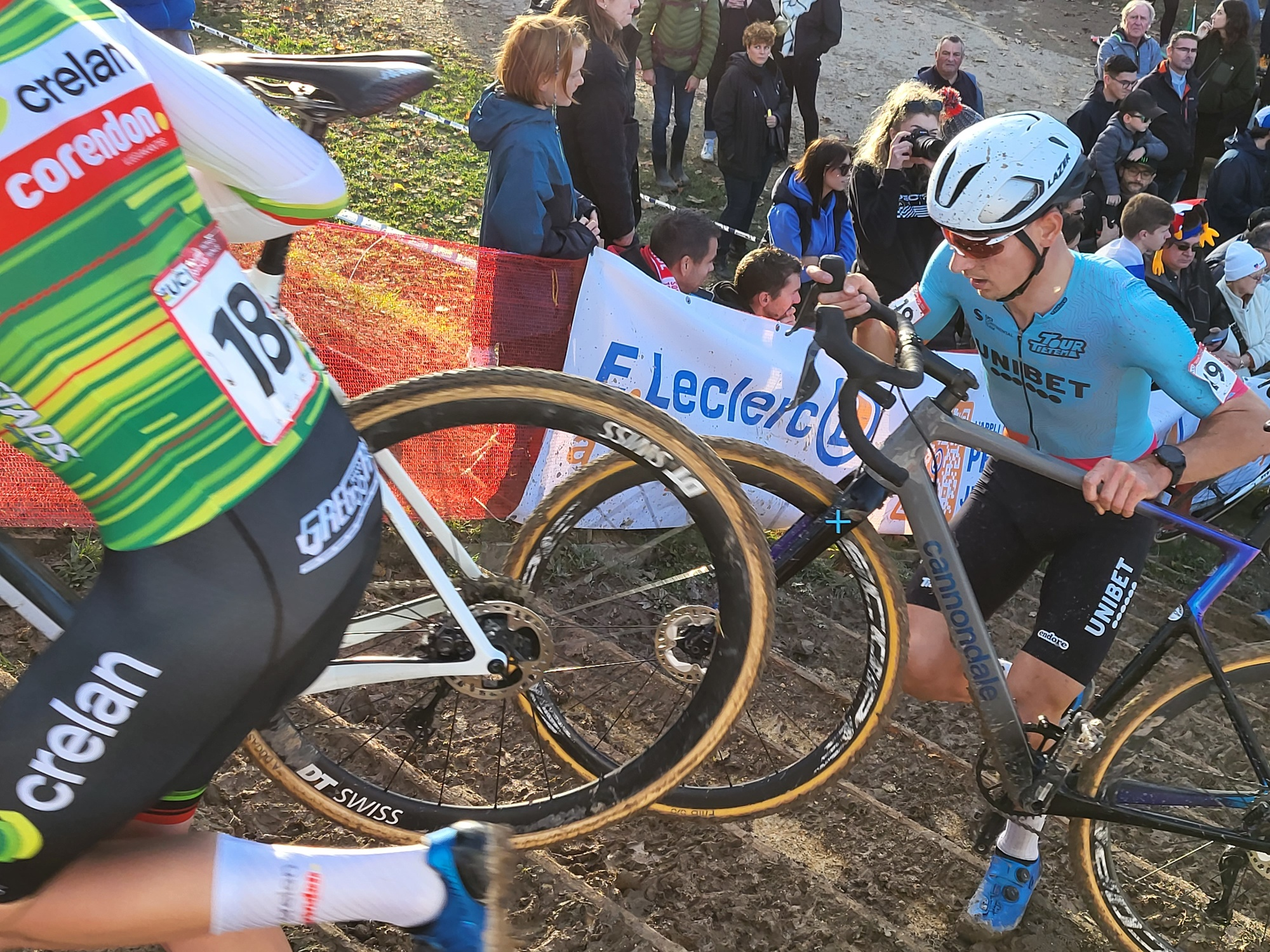
- Loockx in 2023

Personal information
- Born: 25 April 1997 (age 29) Leuven, Belgium
- Height: 1.86 m (6 ft 1 in)
- Weight: 71 kg (157 lb)

Cycling career
- Sport: Cycling
- Current team: Unibet Rose Rockets
- Disciplines: Cyclo-cross; Road
- Role: Rider

Amateur team
- 2016–2017: Cycling.be–Alphamotorhomes CT

Professional teams
- 2018–2019: Pauwels Sauzen–Vastgoedservice
- 2019–2023: Group Hens–Maes Containers
- 2023–: TDT–Unibet Cycling Team

Lander Loockx (born 25 April 1997) is a Belgian cyclist, who currently rides for UCI ProTeam Unibet Rose Rockets.

== Major results ==
=== Cyclo-cross ===
2014–2015
3rd National Junior Championships
3rd Junior Azencross
Junior BPost Bank Trophy

3rd Essen

2016–2017
2nd Göthenburg
2017–2018
2nd Stadl-Paura
3rd Leudelange
3rd Balan
2018–2019
Under-23 DVV Trophy

1st Brussels
2nd Baal

1st Stadl-Paura
2nd National Under-23 Championships
Under-23 Brico Cross

2nd Ronse

National Trophy Series

2nd Crawley

3rd Munich
2019–2020
1st Jingle Cross 1
1st Trnava
2020–2021
1st Trnava
1st Podbrezova
Toi Toi Cup

1st Holé Vrchy
2nd Mladá Boleslav

2021–2022
Copa de España

1st Llodio
2nd Karrantza

1st Podbrezova
Toi Toi Cup

2nd Mladá Boleslav

2nd Dohňany
2nd Contern
3rd Stadl-Paura
2022–2023
1st Fayetteville
Copa de España

3rd Llodio

2023–2024
1st Düsseldorf
1st Auxerre
Swiss Cup

2nd Steinmaur

2nd Pétange
2024–2025
Swiss Cup

1st Steinmaur

1st Pétange
2025–2026
Swiss Cup

1st Hittnau

1st Béthune
1st Gernelle
1st Gunskirchen
2nd Pétange

=== Road ===
2022
1st Points classification, Kreiz Breizh Elites
2023
2nd B-Z Fruitronde
3rd Overall Tour de Liège

1st Points classification

3rd Romsée–Stavelot–Romsée
4th Overall Triptyque Ardennais
5th Trofee Maarten Wynants
8th Overall Oberösterreich Rundfahrt

1st Prologue

2024
6th Overall Tour of Turkey
7th Overall Sibiu Cycling Tour
8th Overall Arctic Race of Norway
8th Antwerp Port Epic
10th Dwars door het Hageland
2025 (1 pro win)
1st Paris–Camembert
1st Mountains classification, Tour de Taiwan
6th Overall Région Pays de la Loire Tour

=== Gravel ===
2023
UCI World Series

8th Limburg
