= Davide Bomboi =

Belgian professional road cyclist

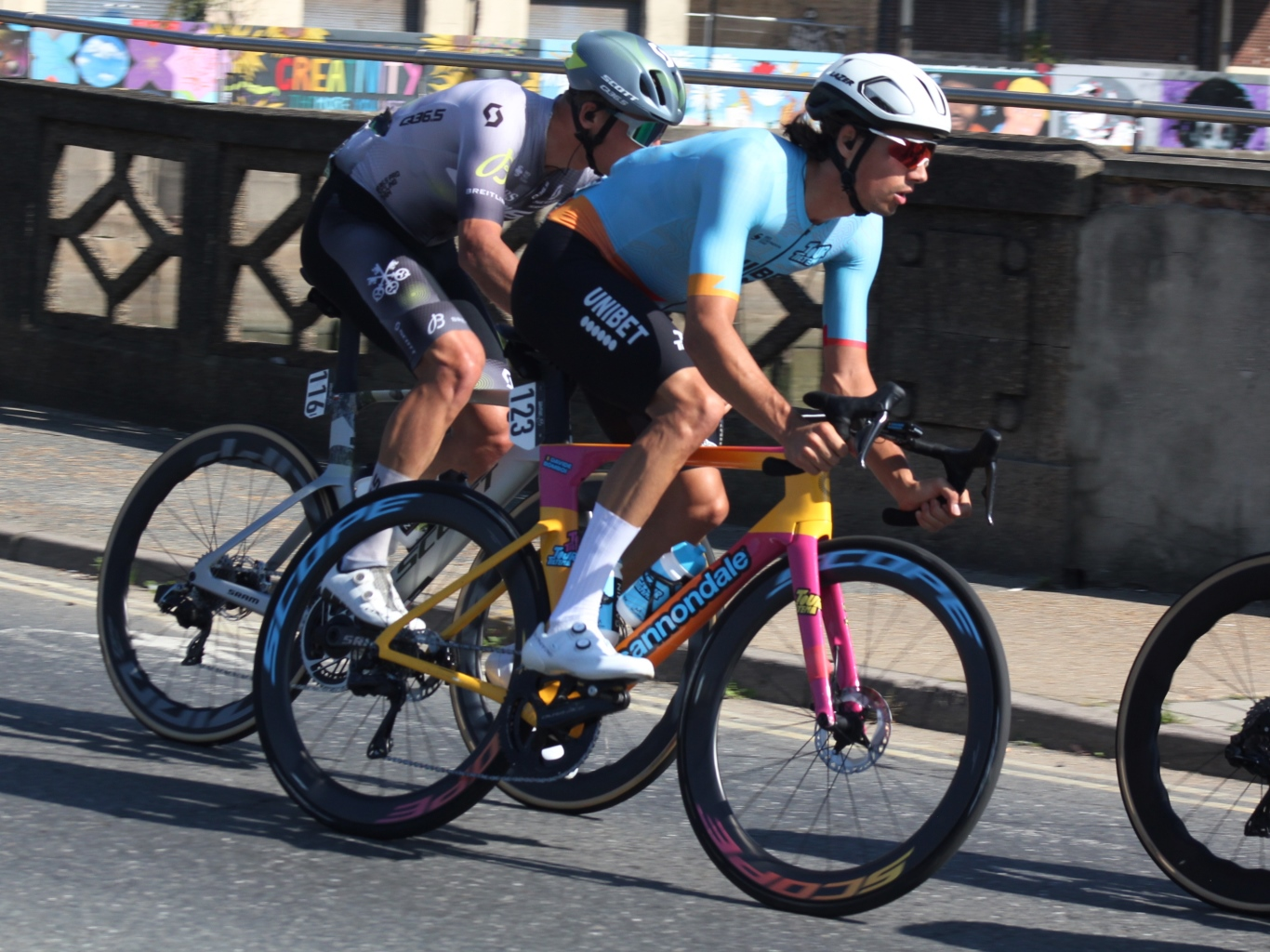
- Bomboi in 2023

Personal information
- Full name: Davide Bomboi
- Born: 27 March 2000 (age 26)
- Height: 1.79 m (5 ft 10 in)
- Weight: 72 kg (159 lb)

Cycling career
- Sport: Cycling
- Current team: Unibet Rose Rockets
- Discipline: Road
- Role: Rider
- Rider type: Sprinter

Amateur teams
- 2017–2018: Acrog–Tormans BC U19
- 2019–2021: Home Solution–Anmapa–Soenens

Professional teams
- 2022: Elevate p/b Home Solution–Soenens
- 2023–: TDT–Unibet Cycling Team

Davide Bomboi (born 27 March 2000) is a Belgian road cyclist, who currently rides for UCI ProTeam Unibet Rose Rockets. Bomboi is the cousin of a former professional cyclist Tom Boonen.

== Major results ==
2017
3rd Ronde van Vlaanderen Juniores
2019
5th Antwerpse Havenpijl
2022
7th Dorpenomloop Rucphen
9th Gent–Wevelgem U23
10th Schaal Sels
2023
3rd Visit Friesland Elfsteden Race
5th Van Merksteijn Fences Classic
7th Grand Prix Cerami
9th Ronde van Overijssel
2024
4th Dorpenomloop Rucphen
2025
7th Trofeo Ses Salines
