= Alpecin–Premier Tech =

Belgian cycling team

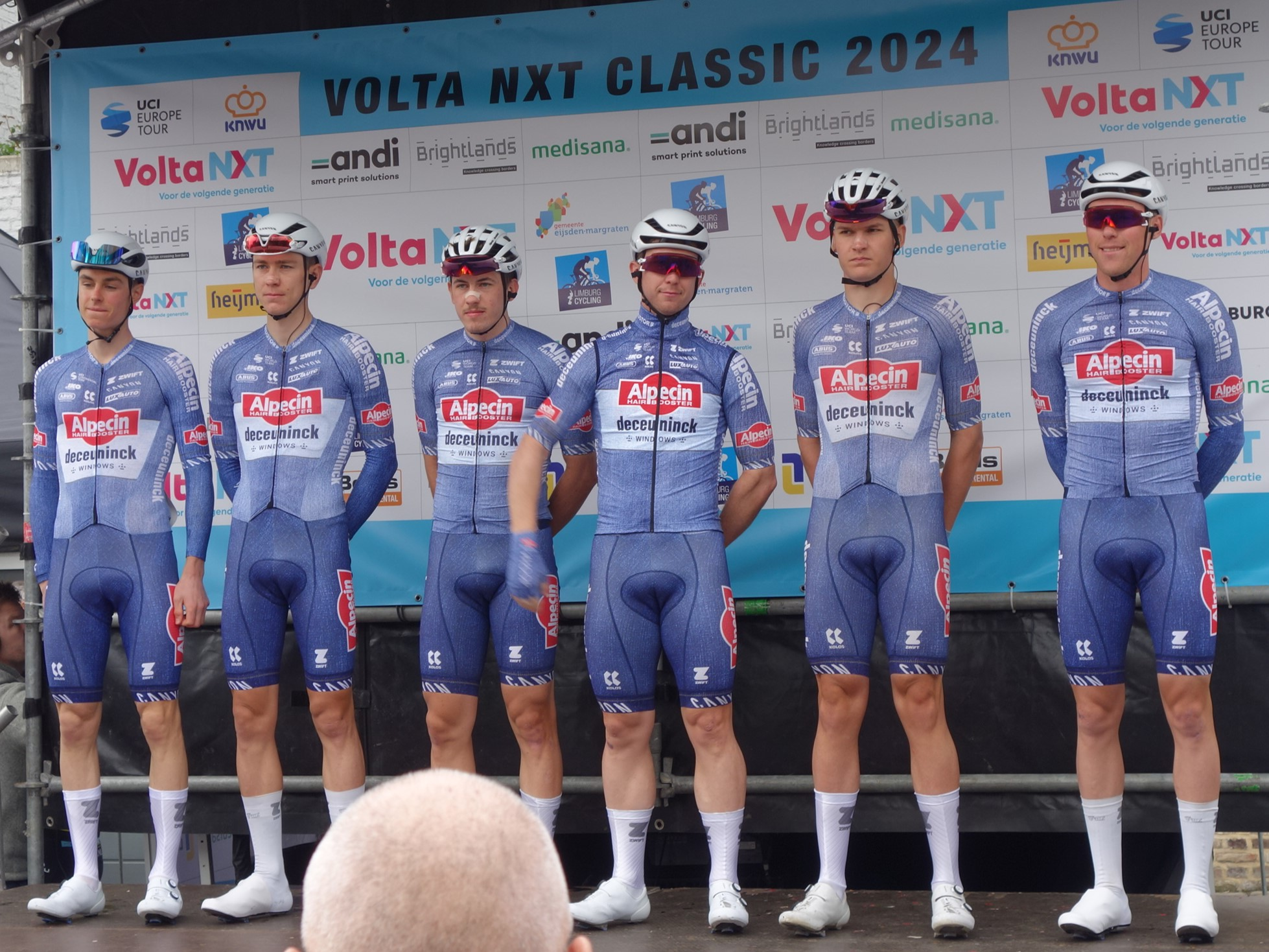

Team information
- UCI code: APT
- Registered: Belgium
- Founded: 2008
- Disciplines: Road, Cyclo-cross, Mountain biking
- Status: Continental (2008–2018); Professional Continental/ProTeam (2019–2022); WorldTeam (2023–)
- Bicycles: Canyon Bicycles
- Components: Shimano
- Website: Team home page

Key personnel
- General manager: Philip Roodhooft
- Team manager: Christoph Roodhooft

Team name history
- 2009–2015 2016 2016–2017 2018–2019 2020–2022 2022–2025 2026–: BKCP–Powerplus; BKCP–Corendon; Beobank–Corendon; Corendon–Circus; Alpecin–Fenix; Alpecin–Deceuninck; Alpecin–Premier Tech
Alpecin–Premier Tech jersey
Jersey

Alpecin–Premier Tech (UCI team code: APT) is a UCI WorldTeam cycling team that is based in Belgium. It competes both in the road and cyclo-cross seasons. The leaders of the team have in the past been cyclo-cross world champion Niels Albert, Philipp Walsleben and Radomír Šimůnek. The team's current lead rider is the cyclocross and road world champion and multiple monuments winner Mathieu van der Poel.

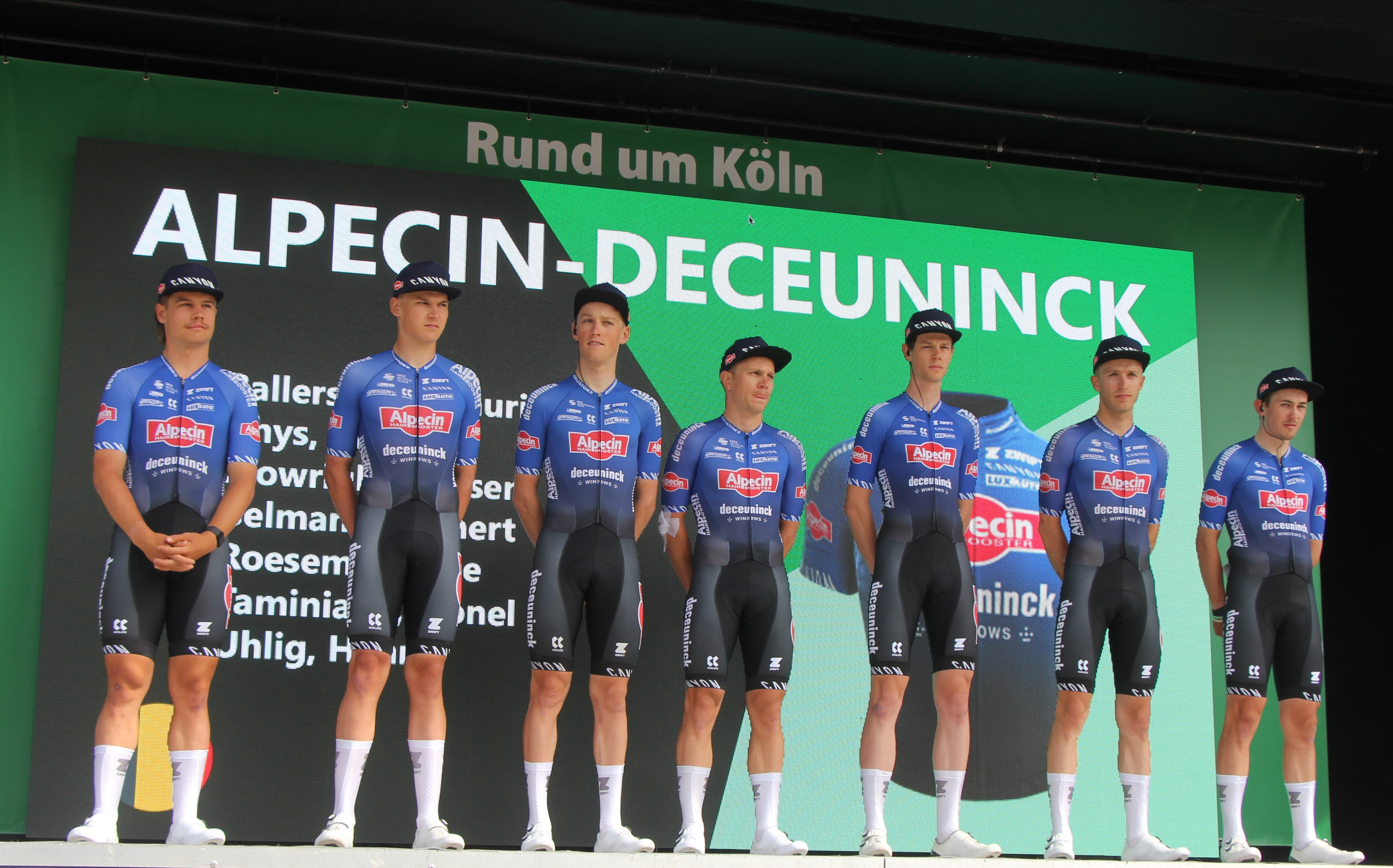
The team at the 2023 Rund um Köln

== History ==
In December 2017, the team announced that Corendon Airlines, a Turkish-Dutch airline company, and Circus, a Belgian betting company had signed three-year sponsorship deals. Circus, who also sponsor the UCI Continental team, ERA–Circus announced they would continue to do so until the end of the cyclo-cross season in March.

For the 2020 season the team rebranded itself as Alpecin–Fenix with German shampoo brand Alpecin and Italian interior design materials company Fenix becoming major sponsors for the team.

On May 16, 2022, the team announced that it would become Alpecin–Deceuninck for the start of the 2022 Tour de France on a 5-year deal bringing them in line with Alpecin and Canyon. This allowed the team to apply for a 2023–25 World Tour licence. The Fenix logo moved to the back of the shorts where Deceuninck used to be.

On December 5, 2025, the team announced that Premier Tech would take over the second naming partner spot formerly held by Deceuninck, on a 3 year deal, at the start of 2026. Deceuninck, however, will stay a partner "in a supportive role" of both Alpecin-Premier Tech and the sister Team Fenix–Deceuninck. Alongside this, it was also announced that Alpecin had extended its title partnership of the team on a 2 year contract with a one year option.

== Team roster ==
As of 5 May 2026.

| Rider | Date of birth |
|---|---|
| Maurice Ballerstedt (GER) | 16 January 2001 (age 25) |
| Tobias Bayer (AUT) | 17 November 1999 (age 26) |
| Lennert Belmans (BEL) | 15 February 2002 (age 24) |
| Francesco Busatto (ITA) | 1 November 2002 (age 23) |
| Lindsay De Vylder (BEL) | 30 May 1995 (age 31) |
| Ramses Debruyne (BEL) | 31 August 2002 (age 24) |
| Simon Dehairs (BEL) | 4 June 2001 (age 25) |
| Tibor Del Grosso (NED) | 27 July 2003 (age 23) |
| Silvan Dillier (SUI) | 3 August 1990 (age 36) |
| Aaron Dockx (BEL) | 28 June 2004 (age 22) |
| Jonas Geens (BEL) | 4 January 1999 (age 27) |
| Gal Glivar (SLO) | 1 May 2002 (age 24) |
| Michael Gogl (AUT) | 4 November 1993 (age 32) |
| Kaden Groves (AUS) | 23 December 1998 (age 27) |
| Hugo Houle (CAN) | 27 September 1990 (age 35) |

| Rider | Date of birth |
|---|---|
| Tim Marsman (NED) | 4 October 2000 (age 25) |
| Jasper Philipsen (BEL) | 2 March 1998 (age 28) |
| Edward Planckaert (BEL) | 1 February 1995 (age 31) |
| Jensen Plowright (AUS) | 15 May 2000 (age 26) |
| Johan Price-Pejtersen (DEN) | 26 May 1999 (age 27) |
| Senna Remijn (NED) | 22 January 2006 (age 20) |
| Jonas Rickaert (BEL) | 7 February 1994 (age 32) |
| Oscar Riesebeek (NED) | 23 December 1992 (age 33) |
| Florian Sénéchal (FRA) | 10 July 1993 (age 33) |
| Sente Sentjens (BEL) | 2 September 2005 (age 21) |
| Gerben Thijssen (BEL) | 21 June 1998 (age 28) |
| Henri Uhlig (GER) | 1 August 2001 (age 25) |
| Mathieu van der Poel (NED) | 19 January 1995 (age 31) |
| Luca Vergallito (ITA) | 14 September 1997 (age 28) |
| Emiel Verstrynge (BEL) | 4 February 2002 (age 24) |

== National, continental and world champions ==
2015
Dutch Cyclo-cross Championships, Mathieu van der Poel
2016
Dutch Cyclo-cross Championships, Mathieu van der Poel
2017
Dutch Cyclo-cross Championships, Mathieu van der Poel
2018
Dutch Cyclo-cross Championships, Mathieu van der Poel
Dutch Road Race Championships, Mathieu van der Poel
2019
Dutch Cyclo-cross Championships, Mathieu van der Poel
Belgium Road Race Championships, Tim Merlier
European Track Championships (Madison), Lasse Norman Hansen
2020
German Road Race Championships, Marcel Meisen
Dutch Road Race Championships, Mathieu van der Poel
Belgium Road Race Championships, Dries De Bondt
2021
Switzerland Road Race Championships, Silvan Dillier
2022
Belgium Road Race Championships, Tim Merlier
UCI Esports World Championships, Jay Vine
2023
World Cyclo-cross Championships, Mathieu van der Poel
World Road Race Championships, Mathieu van der Poel
