= Cycling at the 2018 Summer Youth Olympics – Boys' combined team =

Boys' combined team at the III Summer Youth Olympic Games
- Venue: Parque Tres de Febrero
- Dates: 13–17 October
- Competitors: 40 from 20 nations

Medalists
1st place, gold medalist(s)		Gleb Brussenskiy; Yevgeniy Fedorov	Kazakhstan
2nd place, silver medalist(s)		Nicolas Kess; Arthur Kluckers	Luxembourg
3rd place, bronze medalist(s)		Harry Birchill; Sean Flynn	Great Britain

These are the results for the boys' combined team event at the 2018 Summer Youth Olympics.

== Results ==
=== Team Time Trial ===
Rank	Nation	Time	Points
1	Kazakhstan	8:17.97	100
2	Luxembourg	8:30.59	80
3	Denmark	8:39.14	65
4	Czech Republic	8:42.21	50
5	Poland	8:45.33	40
6	Mexico	8:50.65	30
7	Italy	8:51.50	25
8	Slovenia	8:54.63	20
9	Switzerland	8:54.71	15
10	Great Britain	8:55.70	10
11	Colombia	8:57.05	8
12	Israel	8:59.95	6
13	Hungary	9:00.91	4
14	Eritrea	9:05.31	3
15	Slovakia	9:07.32	2
16	Spain	9:09.24	1
17	Argentina	9:11.15	
18	Russia	9:21.03	
19	Chile	9:25.40	
20	New Zealand	10:06.31	

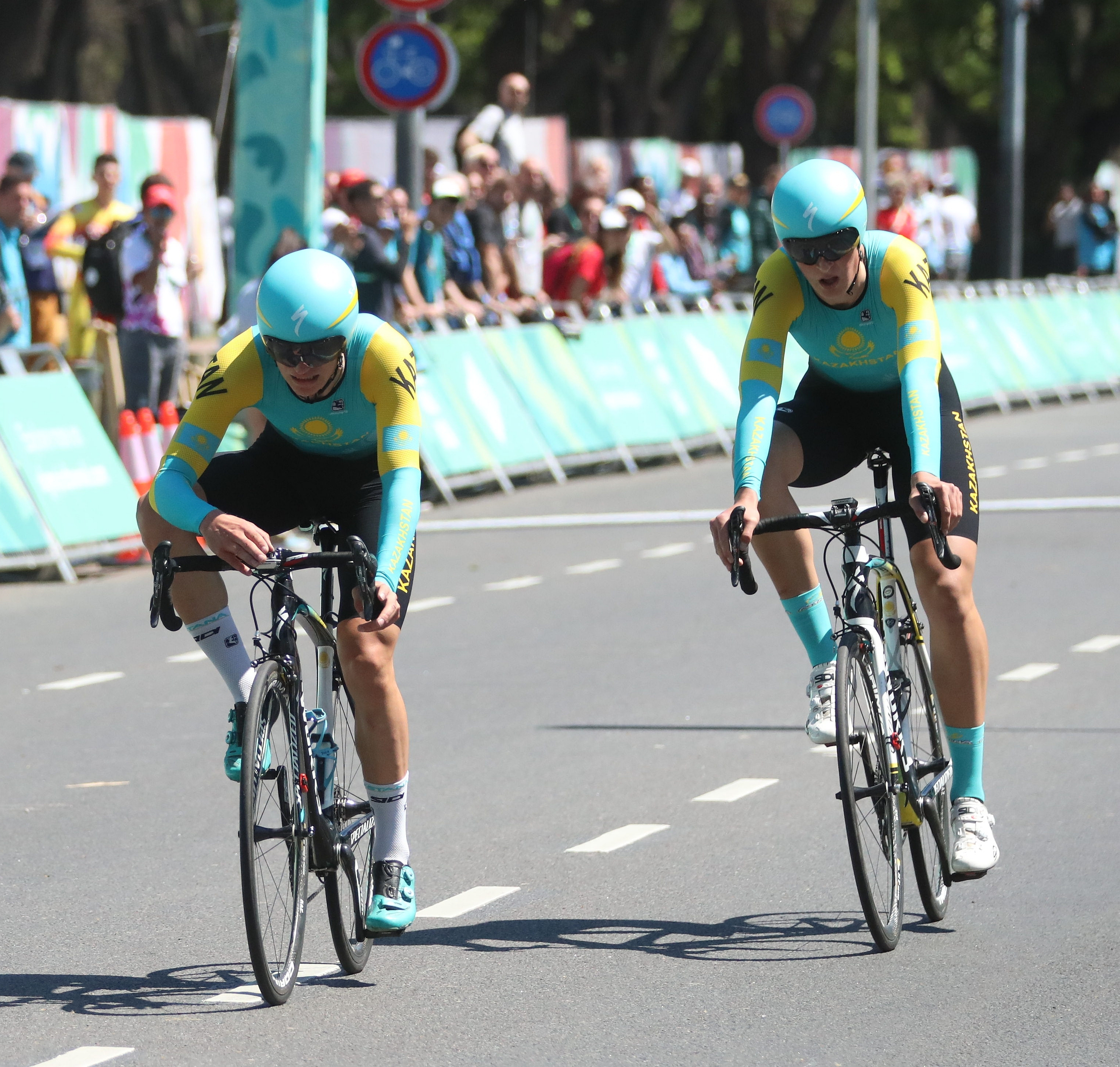
Team Kazakhstan, first place

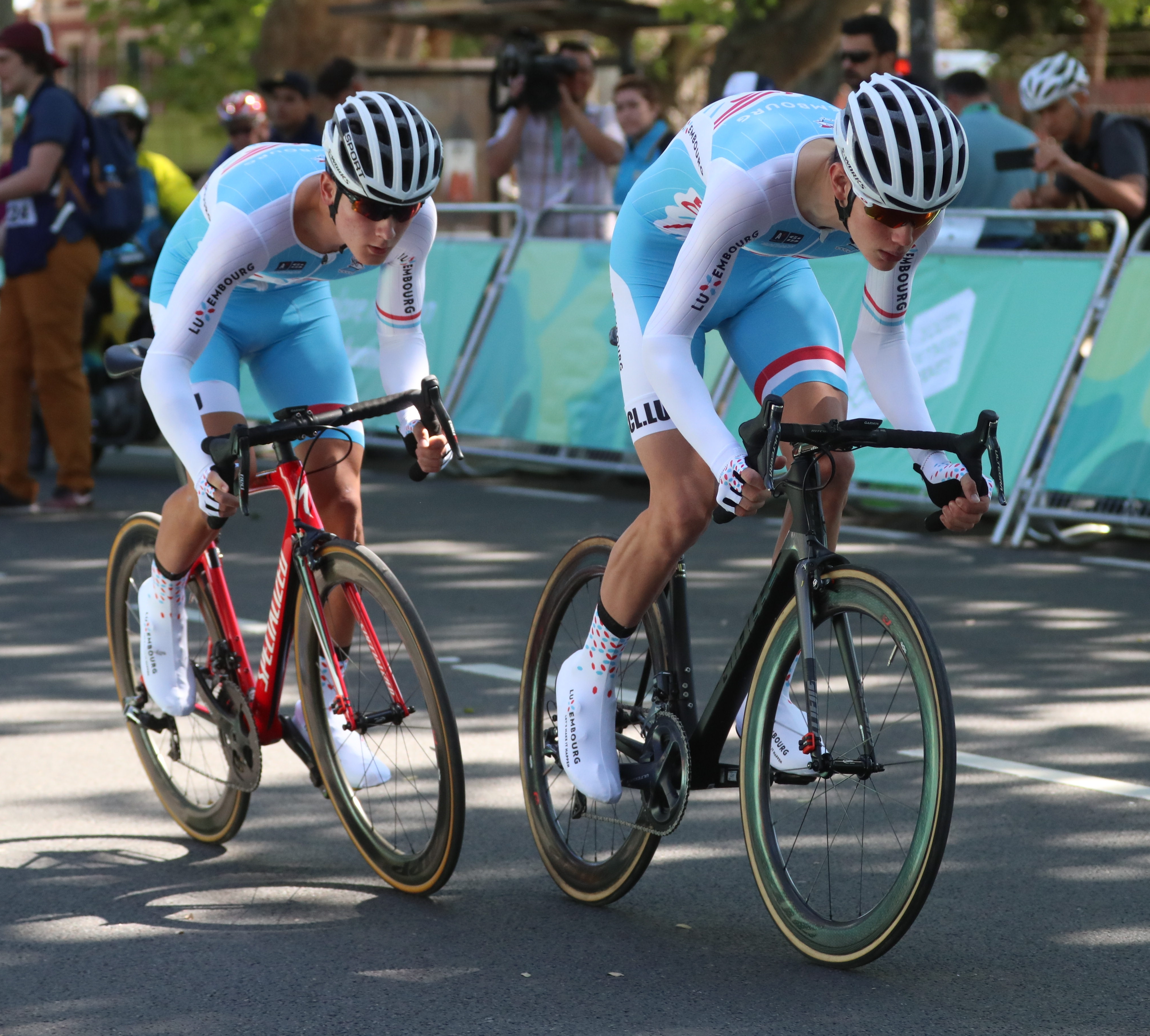
Team Luxembourg, second place

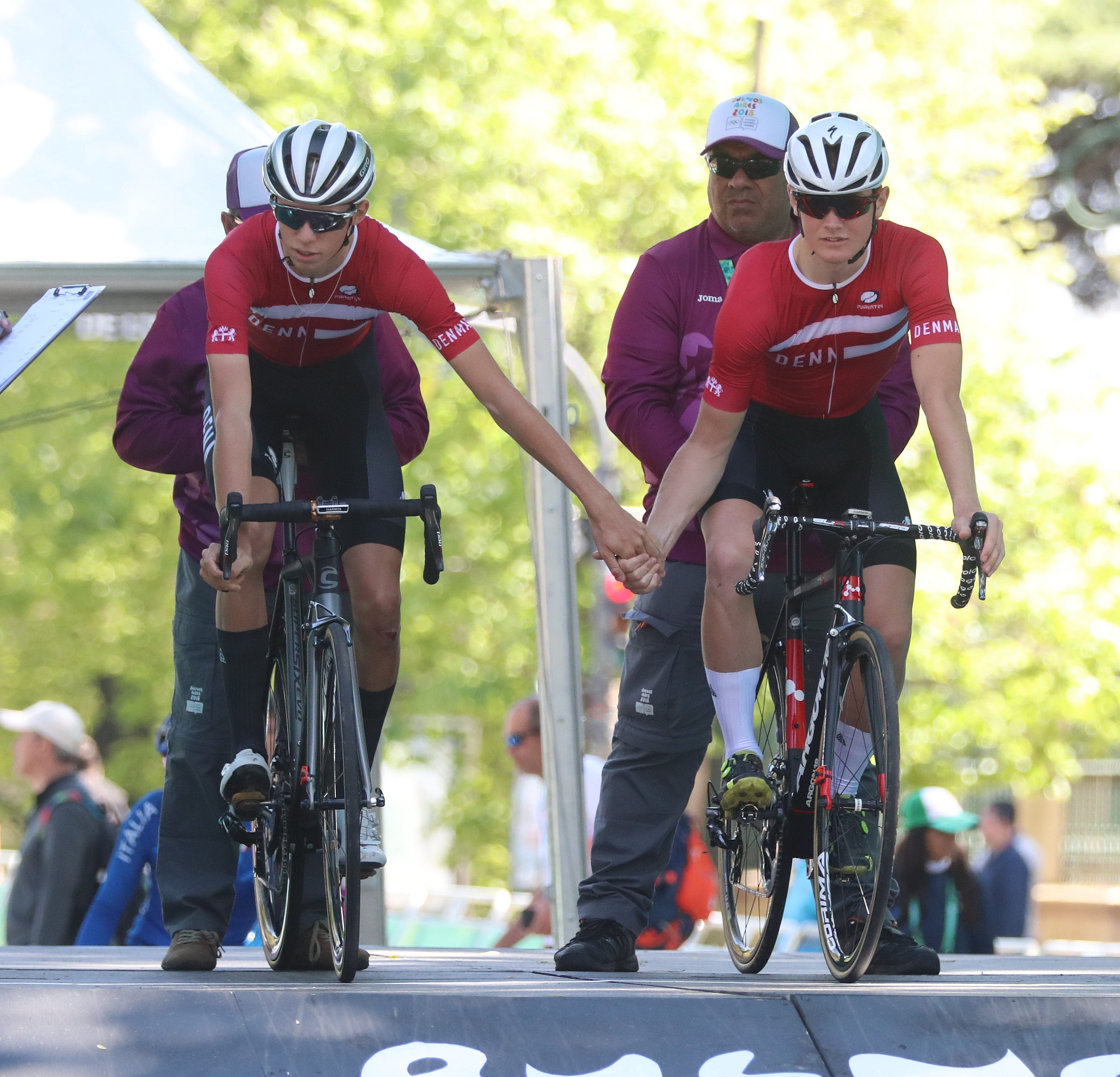
Team Denmark, third place

=== Road Race ===
Rank	Athlete	Nation	Time	Points
1	Gleb Brussenskiy	Kazakhstan	1:30:58	100
2	Arthur Kluckers	Luxembourg	1:30:58	80
3	Yoel Vargas	Argentina	1:31:03	65
4	Nicolás David Gómez	Colombia	1:31:03	50
5	Jacob Madsen	Denmark	1:31:03	40
6	Erik Fetter	Hungary	1:31:03	30
7	Martín Vidaurre	Chile	1:31:03	25
8	Yevgeniy Fedorov	Kazakhstan	1:31:03	20
9	Anže Skok	Slovenia	1:31:03	15
10	Jan Sommer	Switzerland	1:31:03	10
11	Nadav Raisberg	Israel	1:31:03	8
12	Brian Joshua Ivan García Barrón	Mexico	1:31:03	6
13	Sean Flynn	Great Britain	1:31:03	4
14	Biniam Girmay	Eritrea	1:31:03	3
15	Samuel Jirous	Czech Republic	1:31:03	2
16	Alexander Andersen	Denmark	1:31:03	1
17	Tomas Aguirre Garza	Mexico	1:31:03	
18	Petr Kelemen	Czech Republic	1:31:03	
19	Tomas Caulier	Chile	1:31:03	
20	Hager Mesfin	Eritrea	1:31:03	
21	Harry Birchill	Great Britain	1:31:03	
22	Eitan Levi	Israel	1:31:03	
23	Lukáš Kubiš	Slovakia	1:31:03	
24	Carlos Canal	Spain	1:31:03	
25	Aljaz Omrzel	Slovenia	1:31:03	
26	Alex Zapata	Colombia	1:31:03	
27	Nils Brun	Switzerland	1:31:03	
28	Agustín Durán	Argentina	1:31:03	
29	Simone Avondetto	Italy	1:31:03	
30	Maksim Artemev	Russia	1:31:03	
31	Adam Fulop	Hungary	1:31:08	
32	Piotr Krynski	Poland	1:31:16	
33	Damian Papierski	Poland	1:31:36	
34	Nikolay Ivanov	Russia	1:31:40	
35	Nicolas Kess	Luxembourg	1:32:39	
36	Tommaso Dalla Valle	Italy	1:32:48	
37	Tomáš Meriač	Slovakia	1:33:46	
	Max Taylor	New Zealand	DNF	
	David Campos	Spain	DNF	
	Cailen Calkin	New Zealand	DNF	

=== Cross-country eliminator ===
==== Qualification ====
Rank	Athlete	Nation	Time	Notes
1	Erik Fetter	Hungary	1:41.513	Q
2	Martín Vidaurre	Chile	1:42.175	Q
3	Harry Birchill	Great Britain	1:42.618	Q
4	David Campos	Spain	1:43.091	Q
5	Tommaso Dalla Valle	Italy	1:43.734	Q
6	Max Taylor	New Zealand	1:44.363	Q
7	Eitan Levi	Israel	1:44.518	Q
8	Carlos Canal	Spain	1:44.689	Q
9	Simone Avondetto	Italy	1:44.719	Q
10	Sean Flynn	Great Britain	1:45.036	Q
11	Jan Sommer	Switzerland	1:45.231	Q
12	Alexander Andersen	Denmark	1:45.299	Q
13	Nadav Raisberg	Israel	1:45.302	Q
14	Brian Joshua Ivan García Barrón	Mexico	1:45.651	Q
15	Samuel Jirous	Czech Republic	1:45.815	Q
16	Nicolas Kess	Luxembourg	1:45.891	Q
17	Nikolay Ivanov	Russia	1:46.157	Q
18	Petr Kelemen	Czech Republic	1:46.989	Q
19	Nicolás David Gómez	Colombia	1:47.281	Q
20	Anže Skok	Slovenia	1:47.334	Q
21	Agustín Durán	Argentina	1:47.740	Q
22	Arthur Kluckers	Luxembourg	1:47.831	Q
23	Lukáš Kubiš	Slovakia	1:47.972	Q
24	Damian Papierski	Poland	1:48.059	Q
25	Maksim Artemev	Russia	1:49.254	Q
26	Alex Zapata	Colombia	1:49.884	Q
27	Tomas Caulier	Chile	1:50.022	Q
28	Adam Fulop	Hungary	1:50.215	Q
29	Piotr Krynski	Poland	1:50.665	Q
30	Gleb Brussenskiy	Kazakhstan	1:51.264	Q
31	Yoel Vargas	Argentina	1:51.466	Q
32	Nils Brun	Switzerland	1:52.712	Q
33	Tomas Aguirre Garza	Mexico	1:53.442	
34	Jacob Madsen	Denmark	1:54.073	
35	Biniam Girmay	Eritrea	1:55.261	
36	Cailen Calkin	New Zealand	1:56.588	
36	Aljaz Omrzel	Slovenia	1:56.588	
38	Tomáš Meriač	Slovakia	1:57.119	
39	Hager Mesfin	Eritrea	1:59.798	
40	Yevgeniy Fedorov	Kazakhstan	2:01.918	

==== 1/8 finals ====
Heat 1

Rank	Seed	Name	Country	Notes
1	1	Erik Fetter	Hungary	Q
2	32	Nils Brun	Switzerland	Q
3	16	Nicolas Kess	Luxembourg	
4	17	Nikolay Ivanov	Russia	

Heat 2

Rank	Seed	Name	Country	Notes
1	8	Carlos Canal	Spain	Q
2	9	Simone Avondetto	Italy	Q
3	24	Damian Papierski	Poland	
4	25	Maksim Artemev	Russia	

Heat 3

Rank	Seed	Name	Country	Notes
1	4	David Campos	Spain	Q
2	13	Nadav Raisberg	Israel	Q
3	20	Anže Skok	Slovenia	
4	29	Piotr Krynski	Poland	

Heat 4

Rank	Seed	Name	Country	Notes
1	5	Tommaso Dalla Valle	Italy	Q
2	12	Alexander Andersen	Denmark	Q
3	28	Adam Fulop	Hungary	
4	21	Agustín Durán	Argentina	DNF

Heat 5

Rank	Seed	Name	Country	Notes
1	2	Martín Vidaurre	Chile	Q
2	18	Petr Kelemen	Czech Republic	Q
3	15	Samuel Jirous	Czech Republic	
4	31	Yoel Vargas	Argentina	

Heat 6

Rank	Seed	Name	Country	Notes
1	10	Sean Flynn	Great Britain	Q
2	7	Eitan Levi	Israel	Q
3	26	Alex Zapata	Colombia	
4	23	Lukáš Kubiš	Slovakia	

Heat 7

Rank	Seed	Name	Country	Notes
1	3	Harry Birchill	Great Britain	Q
2	14	Brian Joshua Ivan García Barrón	Mexico	Q
3	19	Nicolás David Gómez	Colombia	
4	30	Gleb Brussenskiy	Kazakhstan	

Heat 8

Rank	Seed	Name	Country	Notes
1	22	Arthur Kluckers	Luxembourg	Q
2	6	Max Taylor	New Zealand	Q
3	11	Jan Sommer	Switzerland	
4	27	Tomas Caulier	Chile	

==== Quarterfinals ====
Heat 1

Rank	Seed	Name	Country	Notes	Points
1	1	Erik Fetter	Hungary	Q	
2	8	Carlos Canal	Spain	Q	
3	32	Nils Brun	Switzerland		6
4	9	Simone Avondetto	Italy		4

Heat 2

Rank	Seed	Name	Country	Notes	Points
1	4	David Campos	Spain	Q	
2	5	Tommaso Dalla Valle	Italy	Q	
3	12	Alexander Andersen	Denmark		10
4	13	Nadav Raisberg	Israel		2

Heat 3

Rank	Seed	Name	Country	Notes	Points
1	18	Petr Kelemen	Czech Republic	Q	
2	7	Eitan Levi	Israel	Q	
3	2	Martín Vidaurre	Chile		15
4	10	Sean Flynn	Great Britain		3

Heat 4

Rank	Seed	Name	Country	Notes	Points
1	3	Harry Birchill	Great Britain	Q	
2	6	Max Taylor	New Zealand	Q	
3	14	Brian Joshua Ivan García Barrón	Mexico		8
4	22	Arthur Kluckers	Luxembourg		1

==== Semifinals ====
Heat 1

Rank	Seed	Name	Country	Notes
1	5	Tommaso Dalla Valle	Italy	BF
2	4	David Campos	Spain	BF
3	8	Carlos Canal	Spain	SF
4	1	Erik Fetter	Hungary	SF

Heat 2

Rank	Seed	Name	Country	Notes
1	3	Harry Birchill	Great Britain	BF
2	7	Eitan Levi	Israel	BF
3	18	Petr Kelemen	Czech Republic	SF
4	6	Max Taylor	New Zealand	SF

==== Finals ====
Small final

Rank	Seed	Name	Country	Notes	Points
1	1	Erik Fetter	Hungary		40
2	6	Max Taylor	New Zealand		30
3	18	Petr Kelemen	Czech Republic		25
4	8	Carlos Canal	Spain		20

Big final

Rank	Seed	Name	Country	Notes	Points
1	3	Harry Birchill	Great Britain		100
2	5	Tommaso Dalla Valle	Italy		80
3	7	Eitan Levi	Israel		65
4	4	David Campos	Spain		50

=== Cross-country Short Circuit ===
==== Qualification ====
===== Heat 1 =====
Rank	Athlete	Nation	Time	Notes
1	Harry Birchill	Great Britain	16:41	Q
2	Erik Fetter	Hungary	16:43	Q
3	Simone Avondetto	Italy	16:45	Q
4	Alexander Andersen	Denmark	16:45	Q
5	Eitan Levi	Israel	16:48	Q
6	Nicolas Kess	Luxembourg	16:51	Q
7	Lukáš Kubiš	Slovakia	17:00	Q
8	Agustín Durán	Argentina	17:02	Q
9	Nils Brun	Switzerland	17:03	Q
10	Gleb Brussenskiy	Kazakhstan	17:04	Q
11	Tomas Aguirre Garza	Mexico	17:09	
12	Tomas Caulier	Chile	17:09	
13	Nicolás David Gómez	Colombia	17:22	
14	Piotr Krynski	Poland	17:23	
15	Maksim Artemev	Russia	18:11	
16	Aljaz Omrzel	Slovenia	18:21	
	Samuel Jirous	Czech Republic	DNF5	
	David Campos	Spain	DNF4	
	Cailen Calkin	New Zealand	DNS	
	Biniam Girmay	Eritrea	DNS	

===== Heat 2 =====
Rank	Athlete	Nation	Time	Notes
1	Yevgeniy Fedorov	Kazakhstan	17:14	Q
2	Tommaso Dalla Valle	Italy	17:15	Q
3	Sean Flynn	Great Britain	17:15	Q
4	Carlos Canal	Spain	17:16	Q
5	Nadav Raisberg	Israel	17:16	Q
6	Petr Kelemen	Czech Republic	17:16	Q
7	Jan Sommer	Switzerland	17:16	Q
8	Arthur Kluckers	Luxembourg	17:16	Q
9	Alex Zapata	Colombia	17:17	Q
10	Nikolay Ivanov	Russia	17:17	Q
11	Brian Joshua Ivan García Barrón	Mexico	17:17	
12	Adam Fulop	Hungary	17:21	
13	Anže Skok	Slovenia	17:29	
14	Martín Vidaurre	Chile	17:35	
15	Damian Papierski	Poland	17:42	
16	Max Taylor	New Zealand	17:48	
17	Yoel Vargas	Argentina	18:34	
18	Tomáš Meriač	Slovakia	18:48	
	Jacob Madsen	Denmark	DNF2	
	Hager Mesfin	Eritrea	DNS	

==== Final ====
Rank	Athlete	Nation	Time	Points
1	Erik Fetter	Hungary	19:33	100
2	Yevgeniy Fedorov	Kazakhstan	19:34	80
3	Nicolas Kess	Luxembourg	19:35	65
4	Alexander Andersen	Denmark	19:35	50
5	Petr Kelemen	Czech Republic	19:36	40
6	Harry Birchill	Great Britain	19:36	30
7	Simone Avondetto	Italy	19:38	25
8	Eitan Levi	Israel	19:42	20
9	Tommaso Dalla Valle	Italy	19:44	15
10	Alex Zapata	Colombia	19:44	10
11	Gleb Brussenskiy	Kazakhstan	19:47	8
12	Sean Flynn	Great Britain	19:56	6
13	Nils Brun	Switzerland	20:00	4
14	Lukáš Kubiš	Slovakia	20:03	3
15	Carlos Canal	Spain	20:07	2
16	Nikolay Ivanov	Russia	20:10	1
17	Jan Sommer	Switzerland	20:10	
18	Arthur Kluckers	Luxembourg	20:18	
19	Nadav Raisberg	Israel	-1LAP	
20	Agustín Durán	Argentina	-4LAP	

=== Criterium ===
Rank	Athlete	Nation	Sprint Points	Finish Order	Laps Completed	Points
1	Harry Birchill	Great Britain	13	1	16	100
2	Gleb Brussenskiy	Kazakhstan	7	2	16	80
3	Yoel Vargas	Argentina	6	4	16	65
4	Nicolas Kess	Luxembourg	5	10	16	50
5	Damian Papierski	Poland	4	3	16	40
6	Yevgeniy Fedorov	Kazakhstan	4	7	16	30
7	Aljaz Omrzel	Slovenia	3	27	16	25
8	Petr Kelemen	Czech Republic	2	6	16	20
9	Jacob Madsen	Denmark	0	5	16	15
10	Martín Vidaurre	Chile	0	8	16	10
11	Alex Zapata	Colombia	0	9	16	8
12	Agustín Durán	Argentina	0	11	16	6
13	Jan Sommer	Switzerland	0	12	16	4
14	Simone Avondetto	Italy	0	13	16	3
15	Eitan Levi	Israel	0	14	16	2
16	Alexander Andersen	Denmark	0	15	16	1
17	Tomas Aguirre Garza	Mexico	0	16	16	
18	Nils Brun	Switzerland	0	17	16	
19	Max Taylor	New Zealand	0	18	16	
20	Nadav Raisberg	Israel	0	19	16	
21	Maksim Artemev	Russia	0	20	16	
22	Tomas Caulier	Chile	0	21	16	
23	Arthur Kluckers	Luxembourg	0	22	16	
24	Sean Flynn	Great Britain	0	23	16	
25	Hager Mesfin	Eritrea	0	24	16	
26	David Campos	Spain	0	25	16	
27	Carlos Canal	Spain	0	26	16	
28	Nikolay Ivanov	Russia	0	28	16	
29	Lukáš Kubiš	Slovakia	0	29	16	
30	Biniam Girmay	Eritrea	0	30	16	
31	Anže Skok	Slovenia	0	31	16	
32	Erik Fetter	Hungary	0	32	16	
	Samuel Jirous	Czech Republic	0	DNF	15	
	Tommaso Dalla Valle	Italy	0	DNF	13	
	Nicolás David Gómez	Colombia	0	DNF	13	
	Piotr Krynski	Poland	0	DNF	12	
	Brian Joshua Ivan García Barrón	Mexico	0	DNF	11	
	Tomáš Meriač	Slovakia	0	DNF	5	
	Adam Fulop	Hungary	0	DNF	4	
	Cailen Calkin	New Zealand	0	DNS	1	

=== Overall Team Classification ===
Rank	Nation	Athlete	Team Time Trial	Road Race	Cross-country Eliminator	Cross-country Short Circuit	Criterium	Total
1st place, gold medalist(s)	Kazakhstan	Gleb Brussenskiy; Yevgeniy Fedorov	100	120		88	110	418
2nd place, silver medalist(s)	Luxembourg	Nicolas Kess; Arthur Kluckers	80	80	1	65	50	276
3rd place, bronze medalist(s)	Great Britain	Harry Birchill; Sean Flynn	10	4	103	36	100	253
4	Denmark	Alexander Andersen; Jacob Madsen	65	41	10	50	16	182
5	Hungary	Erik Fetter; Adam Fulop	4	30	40	100		174
6	Italy	Simone Avondetto; Tommaso Dalla Valle	25		84	40	3	152
7	Czech Republic	Samuel Jirous; Petr Kelemen	50	2	25	40	20	137
8	Argentina	Agustín Durán; Yoel Vargas		65			71	136
9	Israel	Eitan Levi; Nadav Raisberg	6	8	67	20	2	103
10	Poland	Piotr Krynski; Damian Papierski	40				40	80
11	Colombia	Nicolás David Gómez; Alex Zapata	8	50		10	8	76
12	Spain	David Campos; Carlos Canal	1		70	2		73
13	Slovenia	Aljaz Omrzel; Anže Skok	20	15			25	60
14	Chile	Tomas Caulier; Martín Vidaurre		25	15		10	50
15	Mexico	Tomas Aguirre Garza; Brian Joshua Ivan García Barrón	30	6	8			44
16	Switzerland	Nils Brun; Jan Sommer	15	10	6	4	4	39
17	New Zealand	Cailen Calkin; Max Taylor			30			30
18	Eritrea	Biniam Girmay; Hager Mesfin		3	3			6
19	Slovakia	Lukáš Kubiš; Tomáš Meriač	2			3		5
20	Russia	Maksim Artemev; Nikolay Ivanov				1		1
