= Cycling at the 2018 Summer Youth Olympics =

Cycling at the III Summer Youth Olympic Games
- Venue: Parque Tres de Febrero
- Dates: 7–17 October
- No. of events: 4 (1 boys, 1 girls, 2 mixed)
- Competitors: 126 (64 boys and 62 girls) from 33 nations

Cycling at the 2018 Summer Youth Olympics was held from 7 to 17 October. The events took place at the Parque Tres de Febrero in Buenos Aires, Argentina.

== Format ==
For the Youth Olympics instead of competitors competing separately they compete as a team. In the boys' and girls' combined team event two athletes compete together. The event contains five stages; three road events (road race, criterium and time trial) and two cross-country events (cross-country eliminator and short track). One member of each team competes in each stage with the exception of the road race where both cyclists compete.

Two mixed BMX events (racing and freestyle park) will take place with each team containing one boy and one girl. The freestyle park event will contain a team of athletes from different nations.

== Qualification ==
Each National Olympic Committee (NOC) can enter a maximum of 1 team of 2 athletes for the combined events and the BMX racing event. For the BMX freestyle park event each NOC can enter a maximum of 1 boy and 1 girl. As hosts, Argentina was given a team to compete in the combined events and the BMX racing event, however, they declined to use the BMX quota. A further six teams, two in each of the combined events and the BMX racing event was to be decided by the Tripartite Commission, however only two quotas was given to the boys' combined event and one quota was given the girls' combined event, the rest were reallocated to the nation rankings. The remaining quotas for the combined events are to be decided by the YOG Junior Nations Rankings, calculated by using the best ranking from the 2017 Junior Road Nations’ Cup Ranking or the 2017 Junior Cross-Country Mountain Bike World Championships.

The remaining quotas for the Mixed BMX Racing event will be decided by the YOG BMX Junior Nations Rankings, calculated by using the best ranking from the UCI Men’s or Women’s Junior BMX Nations Rankings. The quotas for the Mixed BMX Freestyle Park event will be decided by the ranking of individuals after the 2017 Urban Cycling World Championships.

To be eligible to participate at the Youth Olympics athletes must have been born between 1 January 2000 and 31 December 2001.

=== Combined Team Event ===
| Event | Location | Date | Total Places | Qualified Boys | Qualified Girls |
|---|---|---|---|---|---|
| Host Nation | - | - | 1 | Argentina | Argentina |
| YOG Junior Nation Rankings | - | 1 November | 17 | Switzerland; Kazakhstan; Italy; Denmark; Israel; Spain; New Zealand; Czech Republic; Great Britain; ~~Japan~~*; Poland; Hungary; Mexico; Slovenia; Chile; Slovakia; Russia; Colombia** | Great Britain; Italy; Austria; Denmark; Switzerland; Hungary; Russia; New Zealand; China; Mexico; ~~Japan~~*; Luxembourg; Colombia; Ethiopia; Poland; Egypt; ~~Brazil~~*; Kazakhstan; Ukraine** |
| Tripartite Invitation | - | - | 2/1 | Luxembourg; Eritrea | Eritrea |
| TOTAL | | | | 20 | 19 |

* did not participate
** later added to the participation list

=== Mixed BMX Racing ===
| Event | Location | Date | Total Places | Qualified Team |
|---|---|---|---|---|
| Host Nation | - | - | ~~1~~ 0 | ~~Argentina~~ |
| YOG BMX Junior Nation Rankings | - | 1 November | ~~13~~ 16 | Great Britain; Switzerland; Colombia; Latvia; Japan; Germany; Russia; New Zealand; Brazil; Ecuador; Chile; Thailand; Mexico; Bolivia; Czech Republic; Slovakia |
| Tripartite Invitation | - | - | ~~2~~ 0 | Not used |
| TOTAL | | | | 16 |

=== Mixed BMX Freestyle Park ===
| Event | Location | Date | Total Places | Qualified Boys | Qualified Girls |
|---|---|---|---|---|---|
| Urban Cycling World Championship | (China) Chengdu | 8–12 November 2017 | 8 | Argentina; Brazil; Colombia; Czech Republic; Germany; Japan; Latvia; Russia | Argentina; Brazil; Colombia; Czech Republic; Germany; Japan; Russia; Venezuela |
| TOTAL | | | | 8 | 8 |

- No African country took part in the event, and the quotas were distributed to the next highest ranked nation.

== Medal summary ==
=== Medal table ===
* Host nation (Argentina)

| Rank | Nation | Gold | Silver | Bronze | Total |
|---|---|---|---|---|---|
| 1 | Argentina* | 1 | 0 | 0 | 1 |
| 1 | Denmark | 1 | 0 | 0 | 1 |
| 1 | Germany | 1 | 0 | 0 | 1 |
| 1 | Kazakhstan | 1 | 0 | 0 | 1 |
| 1 | Russia | 1 | 0 | 0 | 1 |
| 6 | Austria | 0 | 1 | 0 | 1 |
| 6 | Luxembourg | 0 | 1 | 0 | 1 |
| 6 | Switzerland | 0 | 1 | 0 | 1 |
| 9 | Colombia | 0 | 0 | 1 | 1 |
| 9 | Great Britain | 0 | 0 | 1 | 1 |
| 9 | Hungary | 0 | 0 | 1 | 1 |
| 9 | Japan | 0 | 0 | 1 | 1 |
| Totals (12 entries) | | 5 | 3 | 4 | 12 |

=== Events ===
| Event | Gold | Silver | Bronze |
|---|---|---|---|
| Boys' combined team | Kazakhstan; Gleb Brussenskiy; Yevgeniy Fedorov | Luxembourg; Nicolas Kess; Arthur Kluckers | Great Britain; Harry Birchill; Sean Flynn |
| Girls' combined team | Denmark; Sofie Heby Pedersen; Mie Saabye | Austria; Laura Stigger; Hannah Streicher | Hungary; Virág Buzsáki; Kata Blanka Vas |
| Mixed BMX racing | Russia; Ilia Beskrovnyy; Varvara Ovchinnikova | Switzerland; Kevin Schunck; Zoé Claessens | Colombia; Juan Ramírez; Gabriela Bolle |
| Mixed BMX freestyle park | Argentina; Iñaki Iriartes; Agustina Roth Germany; Evan Brandes; Lara Lessmann | Not awarded | Japan; Kanami Tanno; Yuma Oshimo |
