= 2022 Tour de Romandie =

2022 UCI World Tour, race 18 of 32

Race details
- Dates: 26 April – 1 May 2022
- Stages: 5 + Prologue
- Distance: 712.36 km (442.64 mi)
- Winning time: 18h 00' 59"

Results
Jersey awarded to the overall winner	Winner	Aleksandr Vlasov^{[a]}	(Bora–Hansgrohe)
	Second	Gino Mäder (SUI)	(Team Bahrain Victorious)
	Third	Simon Geschke (GER)	(Cofidis)
Jersey awarded to the points classification winner	Points	Ethan Hayter (GBR)	(INEOS Grenadiers)
Jersey awarded to the mountains classification winner	Mountains	Toms Skujiņš (LVA)	(Trek–Segafredo)
Jersey awarded to the young rider classification winner	Young rider	Juan Ayuso (ESP)	(UAE Team Emirates)
Jersey awarded to the combativity classification winner	Combativity	Nils Brun (SUI)	(Switzerland)
	Team	(Netherlands) Team Jumbo–Visma	

The 2022 Tour de Romandie was a road cycling stage race held between 26 April and 1 May 2022 in Romandy, the French-speaking part of western Switzerland. It was the 75th edition of the Tour de Romandie and the 18th race of the 2022 UCI World Tour.

== Teams ==
All eighteen UCI WorldTeams, one UCI ProTeam, and the Swiss national team participated in the race.

UCI WorldTeams

- AG2R Citroën Team
- Astana Qazaqstan Team
- Bora–Hansgrohe
- Cofidis
- EF Education–EasyPost
- Groupama–FDJ
- INEOS Grenadiers
- Intermarché–Wanty–Gobert Matériaux
- Israel–Premier Tech
- Lotto–Soudal
- Movistar Team
- Quick-Step Alpha Vinyl Team
- Team Bahrain Victorious
- Team BikeExchange–Jayco
- Team DSM
- Team Jumbo–Visma
- Trek–Segafredo
- UAE Team Emirates

UCI ProTeams

- Equipo Kern Pharma

National Teams

- Switzerland

== Route ==
Stage characteristics and winners
Stage	Date	Route	Distance	Type	Winner
P	26 April	Lausanne	5.12 km (3.18 mi)	Individual time trial	Ethan Hayter (GBR)
1	27 April	La Grande Béroche to Romont	178 km (111 mi)	Hilly stage	Dylan Teuns (BEL)
2	28 April	Echallens to Echallens	168.2 km (104.5 mi)	Hilly stage	Ethan Hayter (GBR)
3	29 April	Valbroye to Valbroye	165.1 km (102.6 mi)	Hilly stage	Patrick Bevin (NZL)
4	30 April	Aigle to Zinal/Val d'Anniviers	180.1 km (111.9 mi)	Mountain stage	Sergio Higuita (COL)
5	1 May	Aigle to Villars	15.84 km (9.84 mi)	Individual time trial	Aleksandr Vlasov^{[a]}
Total			712.36 km (442.64 mi)		

== Stages ==
=== Prologue ===
26 April 2022 — Lausanne, 5.12 kilometres (3.18 mi) (ITT)

Prologue result
Rank	Rider	Team	Time
1	Ethan Hayter (GBR)	INEOS Grenadiers	5' 52"
2	Rohan Dennis (AUS)	Team Jumbo–Visma	+ 4"
3	Felix Großschartner (AUT)	Bora–Hansgrohe	+ 10"
4	Geraint Thomas (GBR)	INEOS Grenadiers	+ 10"
5	Maximilian Schachmann (GER)	Bora–Hansgrohe	+ 13"
6	Matteo Sobrero (ITA)	Team BikeExchange–Jayco	+ 13"
7	Ethan Vernon (GBR)	Quick-Step Alpha Vinyl Team	+ 14"
8	Georg Steinhauser (GER)	EF Education–EasyPost	+ 14"
9	Mauro Schmid (SUI)	Quick-Step Alpha Vinyl Team	+ 14"
10	Juan Ayuso (ESP)	UAE Team Emirates	+ 14"

General classification after prologue
Rank	Rider	Team	Time
1	Ethan Hayter (GBR)	INEOS Grenadiers	5' 52"
2	Rohan Dennis (AUS)	Team Jumbo–Visma	+ 4"
3	Felix Großschartner (AUT)	Bora–Hansgrohe	+ 10"
4	Geraint Thomas (GBR)	INEOS Grenadiers	+ 10"
5	Maximilian Schachmann (GER)	Bora–Hansgrohe	+ 13"
6	Matteo Sobrero (ITA)	Team BikeExchange–Jayco	+ 13"
7	Ethan Vernon (GBR)	Quick-Step Alpha Vinyl Team	+ 14"
8	Georg Steinhauser (GER)	EF Education–EasyPost	+ 14"
9	Mauro Schmid (SUI)	Quick-Step Alpha Vinyl Team	+ 14"
10	Juan Ayuso (ESP)	UAE Team Emirates	+ 14"

=== Stage 1 ===
27 April 2022 — La Grande Béroche to Romont, 178 kilometres (111 mi)

Stage 1 result
Rank	Rider	Team	Time
1	Dylan Teuns (BEL)	Team Bahrain Victorious	4h 23' 58"
2	Rohan Dennis (AUS)	Team Jumbo–Visma	+ 0"
3	Marc Hirschi (SUI)	UAE Team Emirates	+ 2"
4	Aleksandr Vlasov^{[a]}	Bora–Hansgrohe	+ 2"
5	Quinten Hermans (BEL)	Intermarché–Wanty–Gobert Matériaux	+ 2"
6	Ben O'Connor (AUS)	AG2R Citroën Team	+ 4"
7	Damiano Caruso (ITA)	Team Bahrain Victorious	+ 4"
8	Juan Ayuso (ESP)	UAE Team Emirates	+ 4"
9	Steff Cras (BEL)	Lotto–Soudal	+ 4"
10	Mauro Schmid (SUI)	Quick-Step Alpha Vinyl Team	+ 4"

General classification after stage 1
Rank	Rider	Team	Time
1	Rohan Dennis (AUS)	Team Jumbo–Visma	4h 29' 48"
2	Felix Großschartner (AUT)	Bora–Hansgrohe	+ 16"
3	Geraint Thomas (GBR)	INEOS Grenadiers	+ 16"
4	Dylan Teuns (BEL)	Team Bahrain Victorious	+ 18"
5	Mauro Schmid (SUI)	Quick-Step Alpha Vinyl Team	+ 20"
6	Juan Ayuso (ESP)	UAE Team Emirates	+ 20"
7	Mikkel Frølich Honoré (DEN)	Quick-Step Alpha Vinyl Team	+ 20"
8	Patrick Bevin (AUS)	Israel–Premier Tech	+ 22"
9	Aleksandr Vlasov^{[a]}	Bora–Hansgrohe	+ 23"
10	Brandon McNulty (USA)	UAE Team Emirates	+ 23"

=== Stage 2 ===
28 April 2022 — Echallens to Echallens, 168.2 kilometres (104.5 mi)

Stage 2 result
Rank	Rider	Team	Time
1	Ethan Hayter (GBR)	INEOS Grenadiers	4h 04' 55"
2	Jon Aberasturi (ESP)	Trek–Segafredo	+ 0"
3	Fernando Gaviria (COL)	UAE Team Emirates	+ 0"
4	Aleksandr Vlasov^{[a]}	Bora–Hansgrohe	+ 0"
5	Sean Quinn (USA)	EF Education–EasyPost	+ 0"
6	Quinten Hermans (BEL)	Intermarché–Wanty–Gobert Matériaux	+ 0"
7	Nikias Arndt (GER)	Team DSM	+ 0"
8	Ben O'Connor (AUS)	AG2R Citroën Team	+ 0"
9	Felix Großschartner (AUT)	Bora–Hansgrohe	+ 0"
10	Steven Kruijswijk (NED)	Team Jumbo–Visma	+ 0"

General classification after stage 2
Rank	Rider	Team	Time
1	Rohan Dennis (AUS)	Team Jumbo–Visma	8h 34' 43"
2	Felix Großschartner (AUT)	Bora–Hansgrohe	+ 16"
3	Mauro Schmid (SUI)	Quick-Step Alpha Vinyl Team	+ 18"
4	Dylan Teuns (BEL)	Team Bahrain Victorious	+ 18"
5	Juan Ayuso (ESP)	UAE Team Emirates	+ 18"
6	Mikkel Frølich Honoré (DEN)	Quick-Step Alpha Vinyl Team	+ 18"
7	Patrick Bevin (AUS)	Israel–Premier Tech	+ 20"
8	Brandon McNulty (USA)	UAE Team Emirates	+ 21"
9	Aleksandr Vlasov^{[a]}	Bora–Hansgrohe	+ 23"
10	Marc Hirschi (SUI)	UAE Team Emirates	+ 24"

=== Stage 3 ===
29 April 2022 — Valbroye to Valbroye, 165.1 kilometres (102.6 mi)

Stage 3 result
Rank	Rider	Team	Time
1	Patrick Bevin (NZL)	Israel–Premier Tech	3h 53' 27"
2	Ethan Hayter (GBR)	INEOS Grenadiers	+ 0"
3	Rohan Dennis (AUS)	Team Jumbo–Visma	+ 0"
4	Dion Smith (NZL)	Team BikeExchange–Jayco	+ 0"
5	Quinten Hermans (BEL)	Intermarché–Wanty–Gobert Matériaux	+ 0"
6	Damiano Caruso (ITA)	Team Bahrain Victorious	+ 0"
7	Finn Fisher-Black (NZL)	UAE Team Emirates	+ 0"
8	Felix Großschartner (AUT)	Bora–Hansgrohe	+ 0"
9	Nikias Arndt (GER)	Team DSM	+ 0"
10	Mikkel Frølich Honoré (DEN)	Quick-Step Alpha Vinyl Team	+ 0"

General classification after stage 3
Rank	Rider	Team	Time
1	Rohan Dennis (AUS)	Team Jumbo–Visma	12h 28' 06"
2	Patrick Bevin (AUS)	Israel–Premier Tech	+ 14"
3	Felix Großschartner (AUT)	Bora–Hansgrohe	+ 18"
4	Mauro Schmid (SUI)	Quick-Step Alpha Vinyl Team	+ 20"
5	Dylan Teuns (BEL)	Team Bahrain Victorious	+ 20"
6	Juan Ayuso (ESP)	UAE Team Emirates	+ 20"
7	Mikkel Frølich Honoré (DEN)	Quick-Step Alpha Vinyl Team	+ 20"
8	Brandon McNulty (USA)	UAE Team Emirates	+ 25"
9	Aleksandr Vlasov^{[a]}	Bora–Hansgrohe	+ 27"
10	Marc Hirschi (SUI)	UAE Team Emirates	+ 28"

=== Stage 4 ===
30 April 2022 — Aigle to Zinal/Val d'Anniviers, 180.1 kilometres (111.9 mi)

Stage 4 result
Rank	Rider	Team	Time
1	Sergio Higuita (COL)	Bora–Hansgrohe	4h 58' 52"
2	Aleksandr Vlasov^{[a]}	Bora–Hansgrohe	+ 0"
3	Juan Ayuso (ESP)	UAE Team Emirates	+ 0"
4	Ben O'Connor (AUS)	AG2R Citroën Team	+ 0"
5	Thibaut Pinot (FRA)	Groupama–FDJ	+ 0"
6	Michael Woods (CAN)	Israel–Premier Tech	+ 0"
7	Gino Mäder (SUI)	Team Bahrain Victorious	+ 0"
8	Sébastien Reichenbach (SUI)	Groupama–FDJ	+ 0"
9	Simon Geschke (GER)	Cofidis	+ 0"
10	Carlos Verona (ESP)	Movistar Team	+ 0"

General classification after stage 4
Rank	Rider	Team	Time
1	Rohan Dennis (AUS)	Team Jumbo–Visma	17h 27' 01"
2	Juan Ayuso (ESP)	UAE Team Emirates	+ 15"
3	Aleksandr Vlasov^{[a]}	Bora–Hansgrohe	+ 18"
4	Ben O'Connor (AUS)	AG2R Citroën Team	+ 25"
5	Lucas Plapp (AUS)	INEOS Grenadiers	+ 30"
6	Gino Mäder (SUI)	Team Bahrain Victorious	+ 32"
7	Sébastien Reichenbach (SUI)	Groupama–FDJ	+ 37"
8	Neilson Powless (USA)	EF Education–EasyPost	+ 41"
9	Simon Geschke (GER)	Cofidis	+ 42"
10	Steff Cras (BEL)	Lotto–Soudal	+ 45"

=== Stage 5 ===
1 May 2022 — Aigle to Villars, 16.19 kilometres (10.06 mi) (ITT)

Stage 5 result
Rank	Rider	Team	Time
1	Aleksandr Vlasov^{[a]}	Bora–Hansgrohe	33' 40"
2	Simon Geschke (GER)	Cofidis	+ 31"
3	Gino Mäder (SUI)	Team Bahrain Victorious	+ 36"
4	Damiano Caruso (ITA)	Team Bahrain Victorious	+ 1' 04"
5	Steven Kruijswijk (NED)	Team Jumbo–Visma	+ 1' 05"
6	Thibaut Pinot (FRA)	Groupama–FDJ	+ 1' 07"
7	Rein Taaramäe (EST)	Intermarché–Wanty–Gobert Matériaux	+ 1' 25"
8	Juan Ayuso (ESP)	UAE Team Emirates	+ 1' 25"
9	Sepp Kuss (USA)	Team Jumbo–Visma	+ 1' 26"
10	Ben O'Connor (AUS)	AG2R Citroën Team	+ 1' 40"

General classification after stage 5
Rank	Rider	Team	Time
1	Aleksandr Vlasov^{[a]}	Bora–Hansgrohe	18h 00' 59"
2	Gino Mäder (SUI)	Team Bahrain Victorious	+ 50"
3	Simon Geschke (GER)	Cofidis	+ 55"
4	Juan Ayuso (ESP)	UAE Team Emirates	+ 1' 22"
5	Ben O'Connor (AUS)	AG2R Citroën Team	+ 1' 47"
6	Damiano Caruso (ITA)	Team Bahrain Victorious	+ 1' 51"
7	Steven Kruijswijk (NED)	Team Jumbo–Visma	+ 1' 52"
8	Rohan Dennis (AUS)	Team Jumbo–Visma	+ 1' 54"
9	Lucas Plapp (AUS)	INEOS Grenadiers	+ 2' 08"
10	Einer Rubio (COL)	Movistar Team	+ 2' 13"

== Classification leadership table ==
Classification leadership by stage
Stage	Winner	General classification	Points classification	Mountains classification	Young rider classification	Team classification	Combativity award
P	Ethan Hayter	Ethan Hayter	Ethan Hayter	Not awarded	Ethan Hayter	INEOS Grenadiers	Not awarded
1	Dylan Teuns	Rohan Dennis	Rohan Dennis	Thomas Champion	Mauro Schmid	UAE Team Emirates	Antoine Debons
2	Ethan Hayter	Rohan Dennis	Ethan Hayter	Thomas Champion	Mauro Schmid	UAE Team Emirates	Nils Brun
3	Patrick Bevin	Rohan Dennis	Ethan Hayter	Krists Neilands	Mauro Schmid	UAE Team Emirates	Nans Peters
4	Sergio Higuita	Rohan Dennis	Ethan Hayter	Toms Skujiņš	Juan Ayuso	Groupama–FDJ	Ion Izagirre
5	Aleksandr Vlasov	Aleksandr Vlasov	Ethan Hayter	Toms Skujiņš	Juan Ayuso	Team Jumbo–Visma	Not awarded
Final		Aleksandr Vlasov	Ethan Hayter	Toms Skujiņš	Juan Ayuso	Team Jumbo–Visma	Nils Brun

- On stage 1, Rohan Dennis, who was second in the points classification, wore the orange jersey, because first-placed Ethan Hayter wore the green jersey as the leader of the general classification.
- On stage 1, Ethan Vernon, who was second in the young rider classification, wore the white jersey, because first-placed Ethan Hayter wore the green jersey as the leader of the general classification.
- On stage 2, Dylan Teuns, who was second in the points classification, wore the orange jersey, because first-placed Rohan Dennis wore the green jersey as the leader of the general classification.

== Classification standings ==
Legend
Denotes the winner of the general classification	Denotes the winner of the young rider classification
Denotes the winner of the points classification	Denotes the winner of the team classification
Denotes the winner of the mountains classification	Denotes the winner of the combativity award

=== General classification ===
Final general classification (1–10)
Rank	Rider	Team	Time
1	Aleksandr Vlasov^{[a]}	Bora–Hansgrohe	18h 00' 59"
2	Gino Mäder (SUI)	Team Bahrain Victorious	+ 50"
3	Simon Geschke (GER)	Cofidis	+ 55"
4	Juan Ayuso (ESP)	UAE Team Emirates	+ 1' 22"
5	Ben O'Connor (AUS)	AG2R Citroën Team	+ 1' 47"
6	Damiano Caruso (ITA)	Team Bahrain Victorious	+ 1' 51"
7	Steven Kruijswijk (NED)	Team Jumbo–Visma	+ 1' 52"
8	Rohan Dennis (AUS)	Team Jumbo–Visma	+ 1' 54"
9	Lucas Plapp (AUS)	INEOS Grenadiers	+ 2' 08"
10	Einer Rubio (COL)	Movistar Team	+ 2' 13"

=== Points classification ===
Final points classification (1–10)
Rank	Rider	Team	Points
1	Ethan Hayter (GBR)	INEOS Grenadiers	110
2	Aleksandr Vlasov^{[a]}	Bora–Hansgrohe	96
3	Rohan Dennis (AUS)	Team Jumbo–Visma	81
4	Quinten Hermans (BEL)	Intermarché–Wanty–Gobert Matériaux	61
5	Patrick Bevin (NZL)	Israel–Premier Tech	55
6	Dylan Teuns (BEL)	Team Bahrain Victorious	50
7	Toms Skujiņš (LVA)	Trek–Segafredo	50
8	Juan Ayuso (ESP)	UAE Team Emirates	50
9	Ben O'Connor (AUS)	AG2R Citroën Team	50
10	Damiano Caruso (ITA)	Team Bahrain Victorious	45

=== Mountains classification ===
Final mountains classification (1–10)
Rank	Rider	Team	Points
1	Toms Skujiņš (LVA)	Trek–Segafredo	49
2	James Knox (GBR)	Quick-Step Alpha Vinyl Team	34
3	Krists Neilands (LVA)	Israel–Premier Tech	20
4	Nils Brun (SUI)	Switzerland	17
5	Óscar Rodríguez (ESP)	Movistar Team	16
6	Thomas Champion (FRA)	Cofidis	15
7	Ion Izagirre (ESP)	Cofidis	15
8	Einer Rubio (COL)	Movistar Team	12
9	Antoine Debons (SUI)	Switzerland	11
10	Andrey Amador (CRC)	INEOS Grenadiers	10

=== Young rider classification ===
Final young rider classification (1–10)
Rank	Rider	Team	Time
1	Juan Ayuso (ESP)	UAE Team Emirates	18h 02' 21"
2	Lucas Plapp (AUS)	INEOS Grenadiers	+ 46"
3	Einer Rubio (COL)	Movistar Team	+ 51"
4	Sean Quinn (USA)	EF Education–EasyPost	+ 2' 06"
5	Marc Hirschi (SUI)	UAE Team Emirates	+ 3' 04"
6	Mauro Schmid (SUI)	Quick-Step Alpha Vinyl Team	+ 3' 22"
7	Finn Fisher-Black (NZL)	UAE Team Emirates	+ 3' 56"
8	Andreas Leknessund (NOR)	Team DSM	+ 5' 43"
9	Abner González (PUR)	Movistar Team	+ 5' 44"
10	Ben Healy (IRL)	EF Education–EasyPost	+ 12' 30"

=== Team classification ===
Final team classification (1–10)
Rank	Team	Time
1	(Netherlands) Team Jumbo–Visma	54h 09' 15"
2	Team Bahrain Victorious	+ 2' 14"
3	(France) Groupama–FDJ	+ 2' 20"
4	(Spain) Movistar Team	+ 2' 26"
5	(Germany) Bora–Hansgrohe	+ 3' 30"
6	(United Arab Emirates) UAE Team Emirates	+ 4' 03"
7	(United Kingdom) INEOS Grenadiers	+ 5' 33"
8	(France) Cofidis	+ 6' 42"
9	(United States) Trek–Segafredo	+ 8' 42"
10	Israel–Premier Tech	+ 10' 11"

== Notes ==
- ^{a} As of 1 March 2022, the UCI announced that cyclists from Russia and Belarus would no longer compete under the name or flag of those respective countries due to the Russian invasion of Ukraine.
