= Denmark at the 2018 Summer Youth Olympics =

- IOC code: DEN
- NOC: National Olympic Committee and Sports Confederation of Denmark
- Website: https://www.dif.dk/

in Buenos Aires, Argentina 6 – 18 October 2018
- Competitors: 12 in 8 sports
- Medals Ranked 37th: Gold 2 Silver 1 Bronze 1 Total 4

Summer Youth Olympics appearances
- 2010; 2014; 2018; 2026

Denmark participated in the 2018 Summer Youth Olympics in Buenos Aires, Argentina, from 6 October to 18 October 2018.

The Danish team was announced on 18 September 2018.

== Athletics ==
Boys
Track & road events

Athlete	Event	Stage 1		Stage 2		Total	
Athlete	Event	Result	Rank	Result	Rank	Result	Rank
Tazana Kamanga-Dyrbak	Boys' 200 m	21.68	4	21.15	4	42.83	4

== Cycling ==
Denmark qualified a boys' and girls' combined team based on ranking in the Youth Olympic Games Junior Nation Rankings.

Team

Athlete	Event	Team time trial			Road race			XC eliminator		XC short circuit			Criterium				Total	
Athlete	Event	Time	Rank	Points	Time	Rank	Points	Rank	Points	Time	Rank	Points	Laps	Sprint pts	Rank	Points	Points	Rank
Team total	Boys' combined team	8:39.14 (+0:21.17)	3	65	—N/a		41	—N/a	10	—N/a		50	—N/a			16	182	4
— Alexander Andersen		—N/a			1:31:03 (+0:05)	16	1	10	10	19:35 (+0:02)	4	50	16	0	16	1	—N/a	
— Jacob Hindsgaul Madsen		—N/a			1:31:03 (+0:05)	5	40	34	0	DNQ	–	0	16	0	9	15	—N/a	
Team total	Girls' combined team	9:34.11	1	100	—N/a		14	—N/a	145	—N/a		115	—N/a			2	376	1st place, gold medalist(s)
— Sofie Heby Pedersen		—N/a			1:42:19 (+0:59)	10	10	3	65	18:15 (+0:02)	3	65	16	0	20	0	—N/a	
— Mie Saabye Madsen		—N/a			1:42:19 (+0:59)	13	4	2	80	18:27 (+0:14)	4	50	16	0	15	2	—N/a	

== Fencing ==
Denmark qualified one athlete based on its 2018 Cadet World Championship performance.

Individual

Athlete	Event	Pool round						Table of 16	Quarterfinal	Semifinal	Final / BM	
Athlete	Event	Opposition Score	Opposition Score	Opposition Score	Opposition Score	Opposition Score	Rank	Opposition Score	Opposition Score	Opposition Score	Opposition Score	Rank
Jonas Winterberg-Poulsen	Boys' foil	Cervantes (MEX); L 4–5	Chan (HKG); W 5–4	Lim (SGP); L 4–5	Marouf (EGY); W 5–0	Bem (POL); W 5–2	2 Q	Charreu (POR); W 15–9	Chen (TPE); W 15–10	Bravo (USA); L 13–15	Bem (POL); W 15–13	3rd place, bronze medalist(s)

Mixed continental team

Team/athletes	Event	Quarterfinal	Semifinal	Final
Team/athletes	Event	Opposition Score	Opposition Score	Opposition Score
Europe 2: Samuel Jarry (FRA); Jolien Corteyn (BEL); Jonas Winterberg-Poulsen (DEN); Rebeca Candescu (ROU); Paul Veltrup (GER); Veronika Bieleszova (CZE)	Mixed continental team	Europe 3 L 24–30	Did not advance	

== Golf ==
Individual

Athlete	Event	Round 1	Round 2	Round 3	Total		
Athlete	Event	Score	Score	Score	Score	To par	Rank
Nicolai Højgaard	Boys'	73	70	75	218	+8	=9
Anne Wennerwald Normann	Girls'	83	75	76	234	+24	=22

Mixed team

Athlete	Event	Round 1	Round 2	Round 3	Total		
Athlete	Event	Score	Score	Score	Score	To par	Rank
Team total	Mixed team	64	73	143	280	Par	7
Anne Wennerwald Normann		—N/a	—N/a	73	—N/a		
Nicolai Højgaard		—N/a	—N/a	70	—N/a		

== Gymnastics ==
=== Artistic ===
Denmark qualified one gymnast based on its 2018 European Junior Championship performance.

- Girls' artistic individual all-around – vacated

== Karate ==
Denmark qualified as one athlete based on the Buenos Aires 2018 Olympic Standings ranking.

Athlete	Event	Elimination round				Semifinal	Final / BM	
Athlete	Event	Opposition Score	Opposition Score	Opposition Score	Rank	Opposition Score	Opposition Score	Rank
Laura Lyck	Girls' +59 kg	Sawashima (JPN); L 0–2	Fonseca Romero (PUR); L 0–2	Altooni (IRI); W 1–0	4	Did not advance		7

== Rowing ==
Denmark qualified one boat based on its 2017 World Junior Rowing Championships performance.

Athlete	Event	Time trial		Heats								Quarterfinals		Semifinals		Finals	
Athlete	Event	Time trial		Heat 1			Heat 2			Points	Rank	Quarterfinals		Semifinals		Finals	
Athlete	Event	Time	Rank	Time	Rank	Points	Time	Rank	Points	Points	Rank	Time	Rank	Time	Rank	Time	Rank
Thomas Kjelgaard Lolholm Jensen	Boys' single sculls	3:51.93	17	DNS	–	–	DNS	–	–	–	–	Did not advance					

== Shooting ==
Individual

Athlete	Event	Qualification		Final	
Athlete	Event	Points	Rank	Points	Rank
Stephanie Laura Scurrah Grundsøe	Girls' 10 metre air rifle	624.3	5 QF	248.7	1st place, gold medalist(s)

Team

Athletes	Event	Qualification		Round of 16	Quarterfinals	Semifinals	Final / BM	Rank
Athletes	Event	Points	Rank	Opposition Result	Opposition Result	Opposition Result	Opposition Result	Rank
Stephanie Laura Scurrah Grundsøe (DEN); Adriaan de Beer (RSA)	Mixed Team 10m Air Rifle	811.7	18	Did not advance				18

== Triathlon ==
Denmark qualified one athlete based on its 2018 European Youth Olympic Games Qualifier performance.

Individual

Athlete	Event	Swim (750 m)	Trans 1	Bike (19.2 km)	Trans 2	Run (5.0 km)	Total Time	Rank
Sif Nikoline Bendix Madsen	Girls'	9:55	0:38	29:37	0:29	18:17	58:56	2nd place, silver medalist(s)

Relay

Athlete	Event	Total Times per Athlete (Swim 250m, Bike 6.6 km, Run 1.8 km)	Total Group Time	Rank
Europe 1 Sif Nikoline Bendix Madsen (DEN); Alessio Crociani (ITA); Anja Weber (SUI); Alexandre Montez (POR)	Mixed Relay	21:42 (1); 20:55 (3); 22:40 (1); 20:55 (1)	1:26:12	1st place, gold medalist(s)
