= Eritrea at the 2018 Summer Youth Olympics =

- IOC code: ERI
- NOC: Eritrean National Olympic Committee

in Buenos Aires, Argentina 6 – 18 October 2018
- Competitors: 9 in 2 sports
- Medals Ranked 83rd: Gold 0 Silver 0 Bronze 1 Total 1

Summer Youth Olympics appearances
- 2010; 2014; 2018

Eritrea participated at the 2018 Summer Youth Olympics in Buenos Aires, Argentina from 6 October to 18 October 2018.

== Medalists ==
| Medal | Name | Sport | Event | Date |
|---|---|---|---|---|
| Bronze | Abel Yamane | Athletics | Boys 2000 m steeplechase | 15 October |

== Competitors ==
| Sport | Boys | Girls | Total |
|---|---|---|---|
| Athletics | 3 | 2 | 5 |
| Cycling | 2 | 2 | 4 |

== Athletics ==
Boys

| Athlete | Event | Stage 1 | | Stage 2 | | Total | |
| Athlete | Event | Result | Rank | Result | Rank | Total | Rank |
|---|---|---|---|---|---|---|---|
| Meron Goitom | Boys' 1500 m | 3:54.39 | 3 | 12:49 | 42 | 16:43.93 | 8 |
| Haben Ghebremariam | Boys' 3000 m | 8:22.45 | 6 | 11:54 | 13 | 20:16.45 | 5 |
| Abel Yamane | Boys' 2000 m steeplechase | 5:47.71 | 5 | 11:56 | 15 | 17:43.71 | 3rd place, bronze medalist(s) |

Girls

| Athlete | Event | Stage 1 | | Stage 2 | | Total | |
| Athlete | Event | Result | Rank | Result | Rank | Total | Rank |
|---|---|---|---|---|---|---|---|
| Sebah Amar | Girls' 800 m | 2:19.18 | 6 | 2:16.76 | 2 | 4:35.94 | 18 |
| Kisanet Mariskos Hidru | Girls' 3000 m | 9:26.57 | 9 | 13:17 | 10 | 22:43.57 | 5 |

== Cycling ==
Eritrea was given a boys' and girls' combined team to competed by the tripartite committee.

- Boys' combined team - 1 team of 2 athletes
- Girls' combined team - 1 team of 2 athletes

Combined team

| Athlete | Event | Time trial | | | Road race | | | Cross-country Eliminator | | Cross-country Short circuit | | Criterium | | Total points | Rank |
| Athlete | Event | Time | Rank | Points | Time | Rank | Points | Rank | Points | Rank | Points | Rank | Points | Total points | Rank |
|---|---|---|---|---|---|---|---|---|---|---|---|---|---|---|---|
| Biniam Girmay | Boys' combined team | 9:05.31 | 14 | 3 | 1:31:03 | 14 | 3 | 35 | 0 | DNS | 0 | 30 | 0 | 6 | 18 |
| Hager Mesfin | Boys' combined team | 9:05.31 | 14 | 3 | 1:31:03 | 20 | 0 | 39 | 0 | DNS | 0 | 25 | 0 | 6 | 18 |
| Desiet Kidane | Girls' combined team | 10:21.38 | 14 | 3 | 1:42.19 | 11 | 8 | 35 | 0 | 14 | 0 | 9 | 15 | 26 | 15 |
| Danait Tsegay | Girls' combined team | 10:21.38 | 14 | 3 | 1:42:19 | 22 | 0 | 36 | 0 | 16 | 0 | 21 | 0 | 26 | 15 |
