= Tudor Pro Cycling Team =

Swiss cycling team

- Team 2026

Team information
- UCI code: SRA (2019–2022); TUD (2022–)
- Registered: Switzerland
- Founded: 2018
- Disciplines: Road; Track
- Status: UCI Continental (2019–2022); UCI ProTeam (2023–)
- Bicycles: BMC

Key personnel
- General manager: Thibault Hofer
- Team manager: Sylvain Blanquefort

Team name history
- 2019–2022 2022–: Swiss Racing Academy; Tudor Pro Cycling Team

Tudor Pro Cycling Team is a Swiss professional road bicycle racing team which holds UCI ProTeam status. The team was founded as the Swiss Racing Academy and registered with a UCI Continental licence for the 2019 season.

In April 2022, Swiss former professional cyclist Fabian Cancellara took ownership of the team and partnered with Swiss watch manufacturer Tudor to sponsor the team.

In December 2022, Union Cycliste Internationale announced that Tudor Pro Cycling Team was granted a UCI ProTeam licence for 2023 season.

== Team roster ==
As of 6 April 2026.

Rider	Date of birth
Julian Alaphilippe (FRA)	11 June 1992 (age 34)
Will Barta (USA)	4 January 1996 (age 30)
Marco Brenner (GER)	27 August 2002 (age 24)
Arvid de Kleijn (NED)	21 March 1994 (age 32)
Robin Donzé (SUI)	6 November 2003 (age 22)
Jacob Eriksson (SWE)	1 October 1999 (age 26)
Robin Froidevaux (SUI)	17 October 1998 (age 27)
Marco Haller (AUT)	1 April 1991 (age 35)
Marc Hirschi (SUI)	24 August 1998 (age 28)
Petr Kelemen (CZE)	18 November 2000 (age 25)
Arthur Kluckers (LUX)	15 March 2000 (age 26)
Sebastian Kolze Changizi (DEN)	29 December 2000 (age 25)
Stefan Küng (SUI)	16 November 1993 (age 32)
Fabian Lienhard (SUI)	3 September 1993 (age 33)
Marius Mayrhofer (GER)	18 September 2000 (age 25)

Rider	Date of birth
Aivaras Mikutis (LIT)	16 September 2002 (age 23)
Luca Mozzato (ITA)	15 February 1998 (age 28)
Rick Pluimers (NED)	7 December 2000 (age 25)
Mathys Rondel (FRA)	23 September 2003 (age 22)
Michael Storer (AUS)	28 February 1997 (age 29)
Florian Stork (GER)	27 April 1997 (age 29)
Joel Suter (SUI)	25 October 1998 (age 27)
Roland Thalmann (SUI)	5 August 1993 (age 33)
Matteo Trentin (ITA)	2 August 1989 (age 37)
Yannis Voisard (SUI)	26 July 1998 (age 28)
Larry Warbasse (USA)	28 June 1990 (age 36)
Fabian Weiss (SUI)	11 April 2002 (age 24)
Hannes Wilksch (GER)	30 October 2001 (age 24)
Luc Wirtgen (LUX)	7 July 1998 (age 28)
Maikel Zijlaard (NED)	1 June 1999 (age 27)

== Major results ==
2019
Stage 2 Tour du Jura Cycliste, Stefan Bissegger
Switzerland Under-23 National Road Race Championships, Mauro Schmid
Switzerland Under-23 National Time Trial Championships, Stefan Bissegger
2020
Stage 1 Tour de Savoie Mont-Blanc, Joab Schneiter
2021
Stage 6 Giro Ciclistico d'Italia, Aloïs Charrin
Stage 9 Giro Ciclistico d'Italia, Yannis Voisard
Prologue Tour du Pays de Montbéliard, Alex Vogel
2022
Stage 1 Istrian Spring Trophy, Sean Flynn
Stage 2 Istrian Spring Trophy, Alex Baudin
Stage 3 Istrian Spring Trophy, Robin Froidevaux
Stage 3 Le Tour de Bretagne Cycliste, Alex Baudin
Overall Alpes Isère Tour, Yannis Voisard
Stage 2 Tour du Pays de Montbéliard, Arnaud Tendon
Switzerland Under-23 National Time Trial Championships, Fabian Weiss
Switzerland National Road Race Championships, Robin Froidevaux
Switzerland Under-23 National Road Race Championships, Nils Brun
Stage 3 Giro della Valle d'Aosta, Alex Baudin
Czech Republic Under-23 National Road Race Championships, Petr Kelemen
2023
Milano–Torino, Arvid de Kleijn
Overall Région Pays de la Loire Tour, Alexander Kamp
Stage 3 Giro di Sicilia, Joel Suter
Overall Tour de Bretagne, Simon Pellaud
Stage 4 Tour de Hongrie, Yannis Voisard
Stage 3 Boucles de la Mayenne, Arvid de Kleijn
Stage 3 ZLM Tour, Arvid de Kleijn
Sweden National Road Race Championships, Lucas Eriksson
Stage 4 Deutschland Tour, Arvid de Kleijn
Stages 1 & 6 Tour de Langkawi, Arvid de Kleijn
2024
Stage 2 Paris–Nice, Arvid de Kleijn
Stage 1 Settimana Internazionale di Coppi e Bartali, Marco Brenner
Stage 3 Région Pays de la Loire Tour, Alberto Dainese
Prologue Tour de Romandie, Maikel Zijlaard
Luxembourg National Time Trial Championships, Arthur Kluckers
Germany National Road Race Championships, Marco Brenner
Sweden National Road Race Championships, Jacob Eriksson
Overall Tour de Wallonie, Matteo Trentin

Stage 4, Matteo Trentin

Grand Prix de Fourmies, Arvid de Kleijn
Grand Prix d'Isbergues, Arvid de Kleijn
Stages 4 & 5 Tour de Langkawi, Arvid de Kleijn
2025
Clàssica Comunitat Valenciana 1969, Marc Hirschi
Trofeo Serra Tramuntana, Florian Stork
Muscat Classic, Rick Pluimers
Stage 7 Paris–Nice, Michael Storer
Overall Tour of the Alps, Michael Storer

Stage 2, Michael Storer

Stage 3 Boucles de la Mayenne, Marius Mayrhofer
Lithuania National Time Trial Championships, Aivaras Mikutis
Lithuania National Road Race Championships, Aivaras Mikutis
Luxembourg National Road Race Championships, Arthur Kluckers
Grand Prix Cycliste de Québec, Julian Alaphilippe
Memorial Marco Pantani, Michael Storer
Stages 2 & 6 Tour de Langkawi, Arvid de Kleijn
Paris–Tours, Matteo Trentin
2026
Stage 3 AlUla Tour, Yannis Voisard

=== Supplementary statistics ===
Grand Tours by highest finishing position
Race	2023	2024	2025	2026
Giro d'Italia	–	10	10	
Tour de France	–	–	42	
Vuelta a España	–	–	–	
Major week-long stage races by highest finishing position
Race	2023	2024	2025	2026
Tour Down Under	–	–	–	4
UAE Tour	21	6	15	12
Paris–Nice	–	19	5	8
Tirreno–Adriatico	52	44	23	14
Volta a Catalunya	–	–	–	–
Tour of the Basque Country	–	–	29	
Tour de Romandie	18	21	9	
Critérium du Dauphiné	–	–	15	
Tour de Suisse	DNF	19	5	
Tour de Pologne	16	8	11	
Benelux Tour	–	13	61	
Monuments by highest finishing position
Monument	2023	2024	2025	2026
Milan–San Remo	49	21	9	9
Tour of Flanders	–	19	22	43
Paris–Roubaix	–	–	12	
Liège–Bastogne–Liège	–	–	45	
Il Lombardia	83	13	3	
Classics by highest finishing position
Classic	2023	2024	2025	2026
Omloop Het Nieuwsblad	–	9	12	15
Kuurne–Brussels–Kuurne	–	9	5	2
Strade Bianche	50	31	24	20
E3 Harelbeke	–	23	14	10
Gent–Wevelgem	–	10	15	6
Dwars door Vlaanderen	–	–	27	14
Amstel Gold Race	9	27	20	
La Flèche Wallonne	–	–	22	
Clásica de San Sebastián	–	–	25	
Paris–Tours	–	11	1	

Legend
—	Did not compete
DNS	Did not start
DNF	Did not finish
NH	Not held

== National champions ==
2019
Switzerland U23 Road Race, Mauro Schmid
Switzerland U23 Time Trial, Stefan Bissegger
2022
Switzerland Road Race, Robin Froidevaux
Switzerland U23 Road Race, Nils Brun
Switzerland U23 Time Trial, Fabian Weiss
Czech Republic U23 Road Race, Petr Kelemen
2023
Sweden Road Race, Lucas Eriksson
2024
Luxembourg Time Trial, Arthur Kluckers
Germany Road Race, Marco Brenner
Sweden Road Race, Jacob Eriksson
2025
Lithuania Time Trial, Aivaras Mikutis
Lithuania Road Race, Aivaras Mikutis
Luxembourg Road Race, Arthur Kluckers
