= Shooting at the 2018 Summer Youth Olympics – Girls' 10 metre air rifle =

Girls' 10 metre air rifle at the III Summer Youth Olympic Games
- Venue: Parque Sarmiento
- Dates: 8 October
- Competitors: 20 from 20 nations

Medalists
1st place, gold medalist(s)		Stephanie Grundsøe	Denmark
2nd place, silver medalist(s)		Mehuli Ghosh	India
3rd place, bronze medalist(s)		Marija Malić	Serbia

These are the results for the girls' 10 metre air rifle event at the 2018 Summer Youth Olympics.

== Results ==
=== Qualification ===
Rank	Name	Nation	1	2	3	4	5	6	Points	Notes
1	Mehuli Ghosh	India	105.7	105.4	105.1	104.1	104.7	103.1	628.1	Q
2	Wang Zeru	China	103.4	105.0	103.6	105.8	103.9	104.7	626.4	Q
3	Anastasiia Dereviagina	Russia	104.9	103.8	103.7	103.9	104.3	104.7	625.3	Q
4	Victoria Rossiter	Australia	103.9	104.0	105.0	103.8	103.9	103.7	624.3	Q
5	Stephanie Grundsøe	Denmark	103.8	103.4	103.9	104.1	105.6	103.5	624.3	Q
6	Anna Janßen	Germany	103.0	103.4	103.5	104.6	105.0	102.3	621.8	Q
7	Marija Malić	Serbia	105.6	103.1	101.8	103.4	102.6	105.2	621.7	Q
8	Sofia Benetti	Italy	103.8	104.7	103.4	102.2	103.4	103.8	621.3	Q
9	Viivi Natalia Kemppi	Finland	103.7	104.0	103.2	103.4	103.1	103.6	621.0	
10	Wiktoria Zuzanna Bober	Poland	103.1	103.9	101.4	103.2	104.0	102.7	618.3	
11	Chen Yun-yun	Chinese Taipei	103.4	103.2	101.2	103.1	103.9	102.9	617.7	
12	Enkhmaa Erdenechuluun	Mongolia	102.8	103.5	102.3	103.3	102.5	103.1	617.5	
13	Alliana Volkart	Argentina	104.2	100.7	102.6	103.2	102.0	103.4	616.1	
14	Gabriela Martínez	Mexico	101.9	101.7	102.0	102.0	104.5	103.0	615.1	
15	Aoi Takagi	Japan	101.3	103.4	102.8	103.7	100.1	101.5	612.8	
16	Farida Darwish	Egypt	101.5	102.2	103.1	97.7	103.7	103.9	612.1	
17	Amira Hamid	Bangladesh	101.5	100.2	100.7	103.2	101.5	101.9	609.0	
18	Isidora Van de Perre	Chile	101.7	100.6	103.0	100.4	100.6	100.4	606.7	
19	Latifa Al-Maazmi	United Arab Emirates	102.4	100.2	101.2	101.5	102.1	99.0	606.4	
20	Zaynab Pardabaeva	Uzbekistan	99.0	101.0	101.8	98.8	103.4	101.2	605.2	

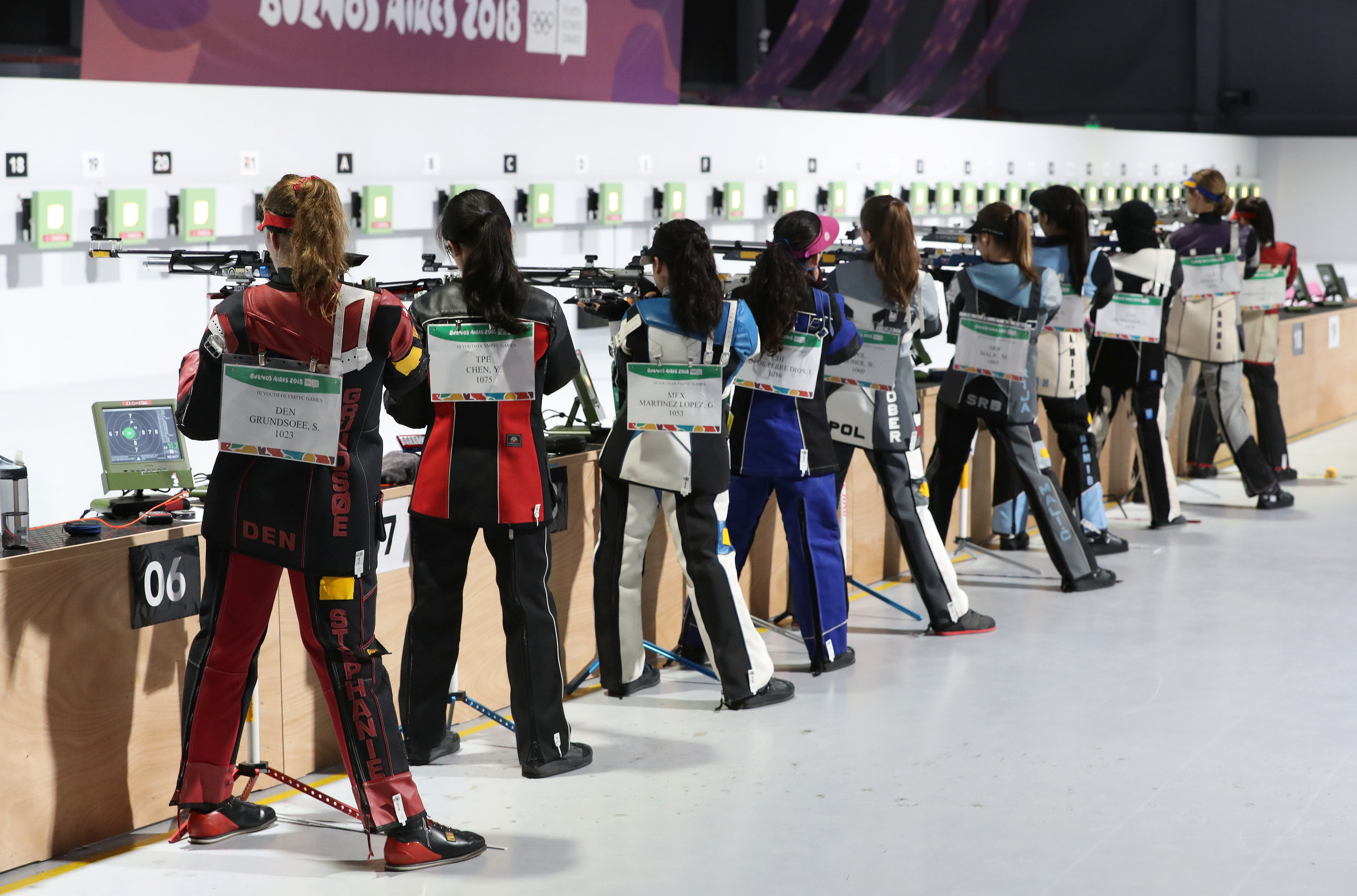

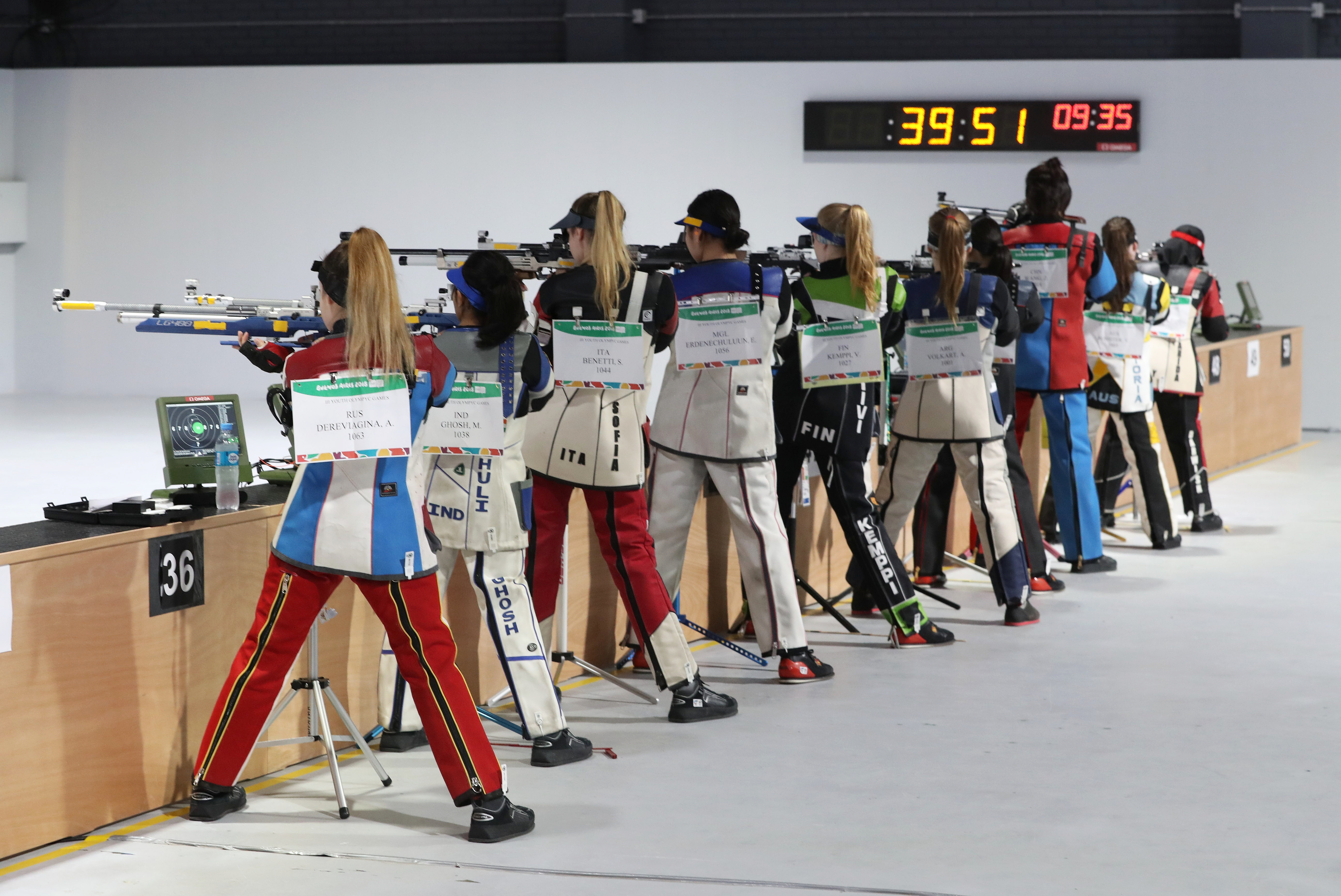

=== Final ===
Rank	Name	Nation	1	2	3	4	5	6	7	8	9	Points	Notes
1st place, gold medalist(s)	Stephanie Grundsøe	Denmark	52.7	50.9	21.0	21.1	20.5	21.4	19.9	20.2	21.0	248.7	
2nd place, silver medalist(s)	Mehuli Ghosh	India	52.4	51.9	20.6	20.7	20.5	20.7	20.5	21.2	19.5	248.0	
3rd place, bronze medalist(s)	Marija Malić	Serbia	50.4	52.4	21.5	20.3	21.7	20.5	20.0	19.4		226.2	
4	Anna Janßen	Germany	51.8	51.4	21.5	20.5	21.1	20.3	19.9			206.5	
5	Wang Zeru	China	51.2	51.0	20.5	21.8	20.3	21.0				185.8	
6	Anastasiia Dereviagina	Russia	51.4	51.8	19.9	20.7	20.8					164.6	
7	Sofia Benetti	Italy	49.8	51.1	20.9	21.2						143.0	
8	Victoria Rossiter	Australia	47.4	50.9	20.6							118.9	

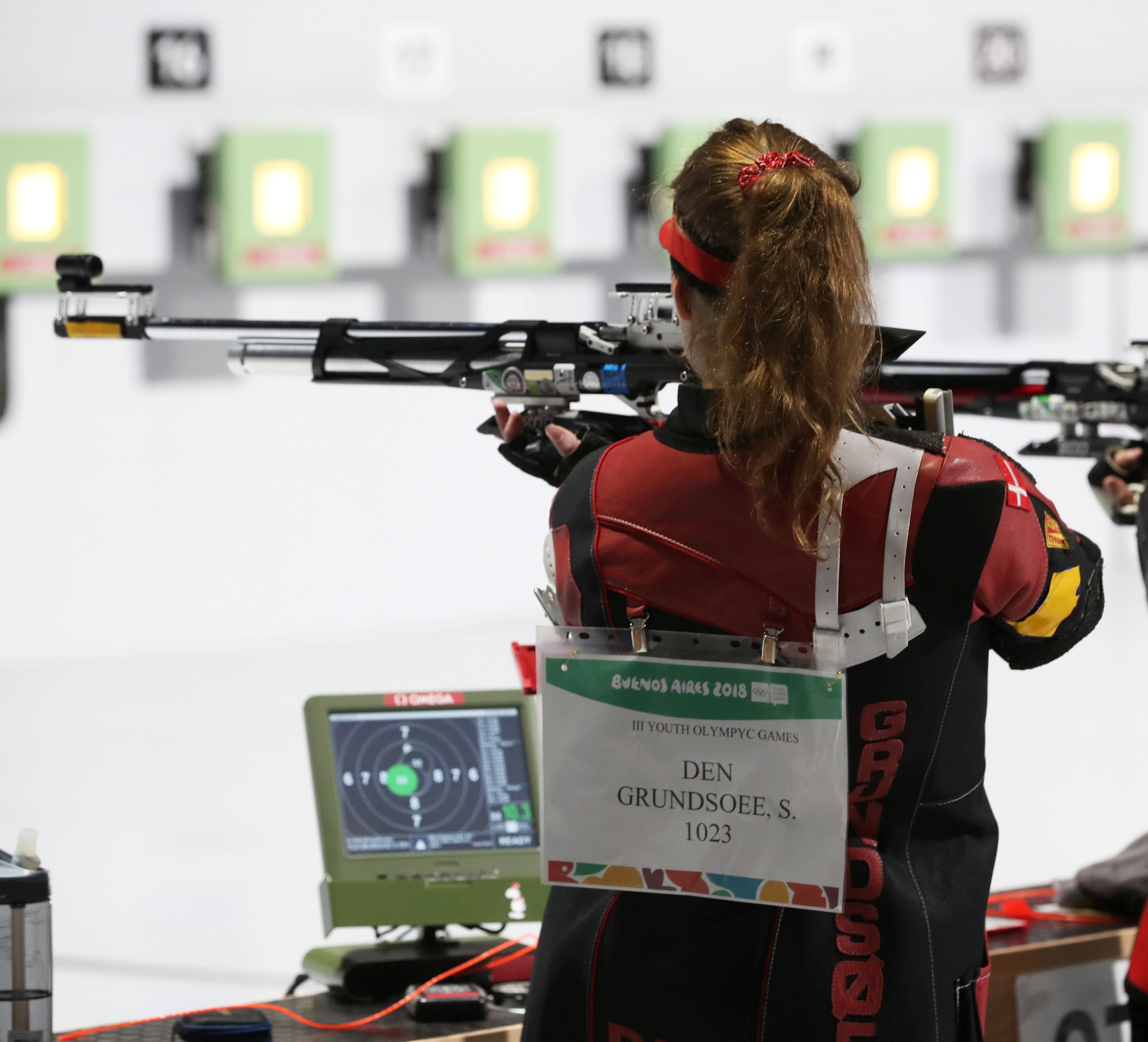
Stephanie Grundsøe, gold medal

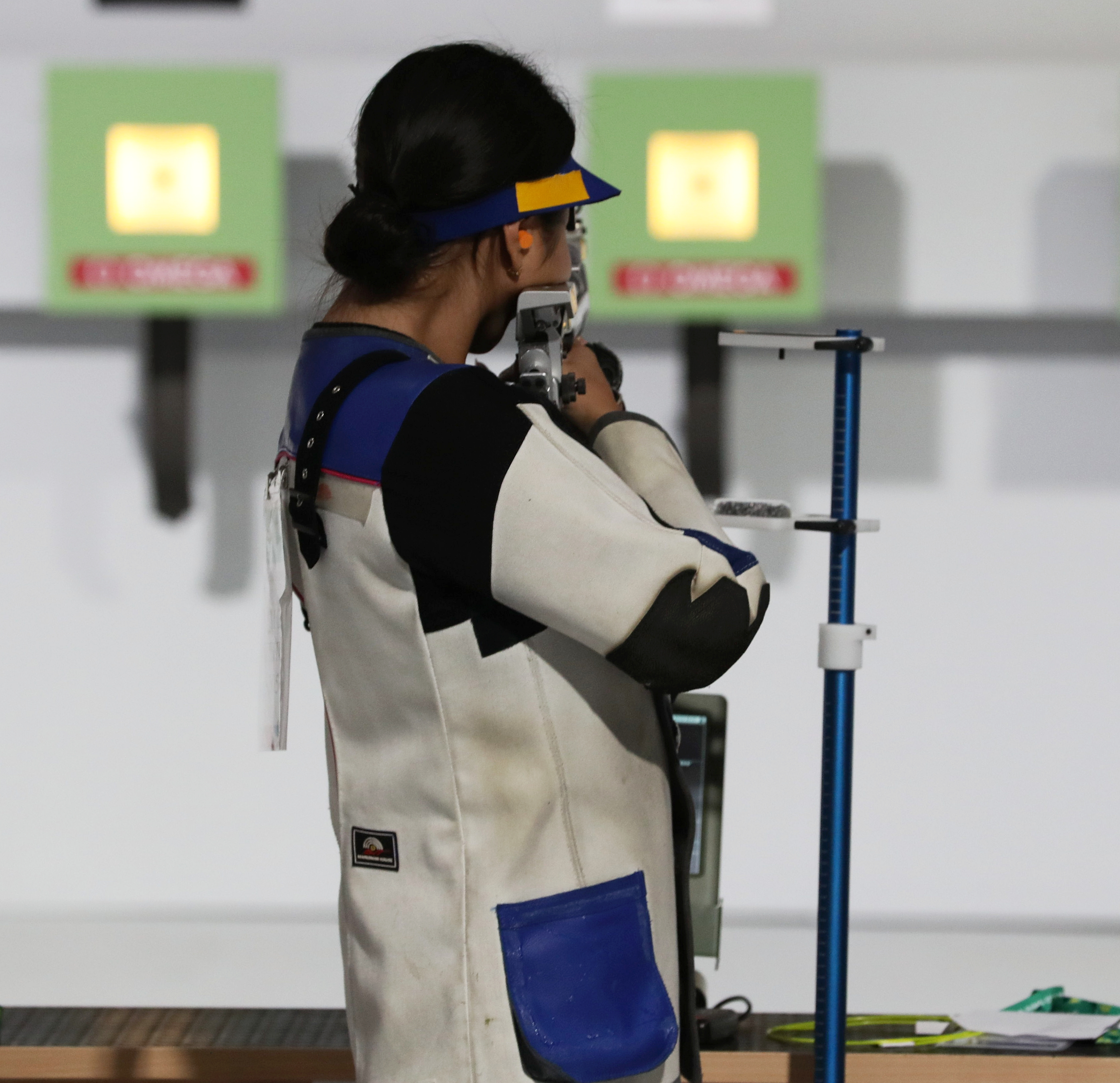
Mehuli Ghosh, silver medal

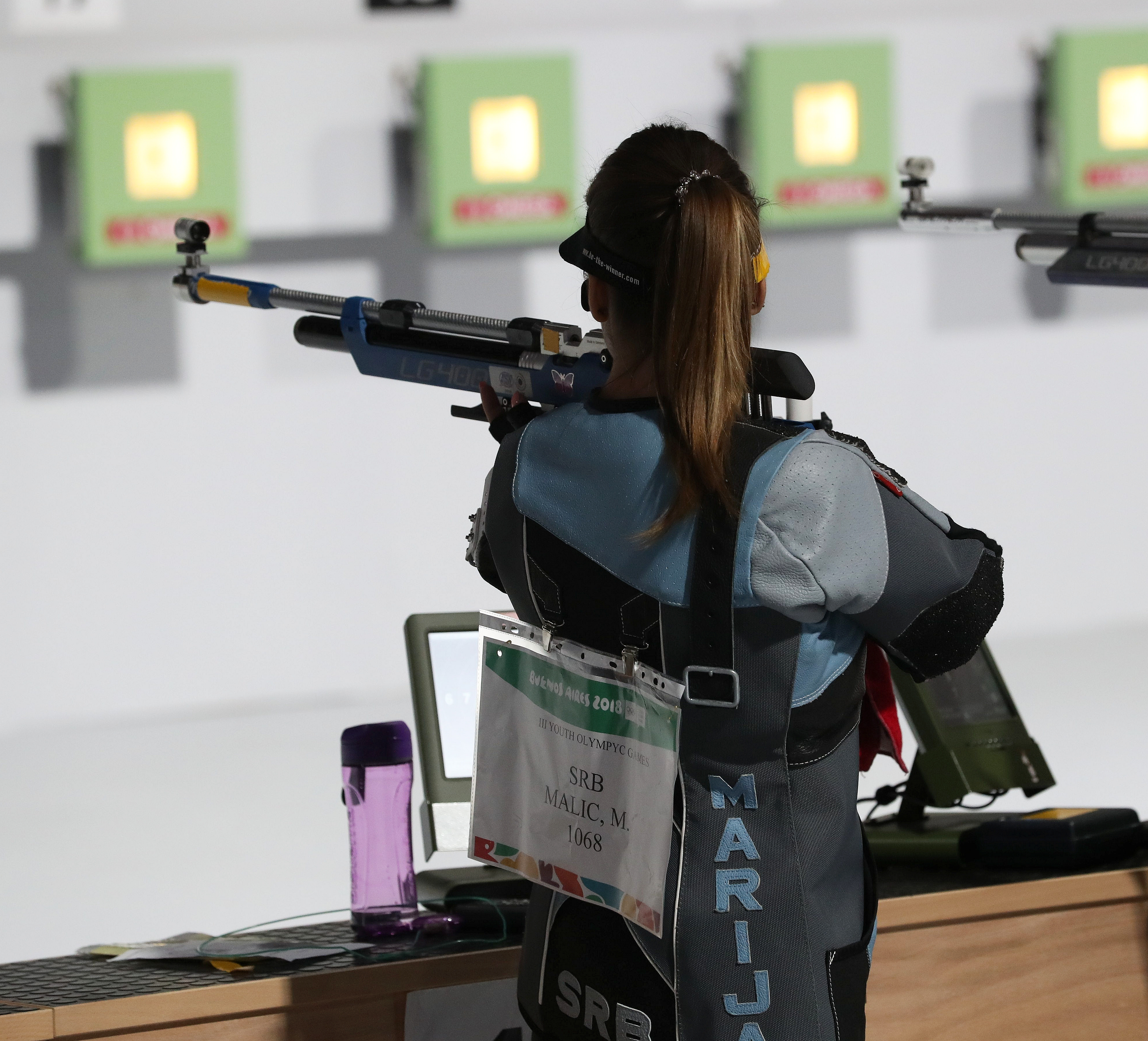
Marija Malić, bronze medal

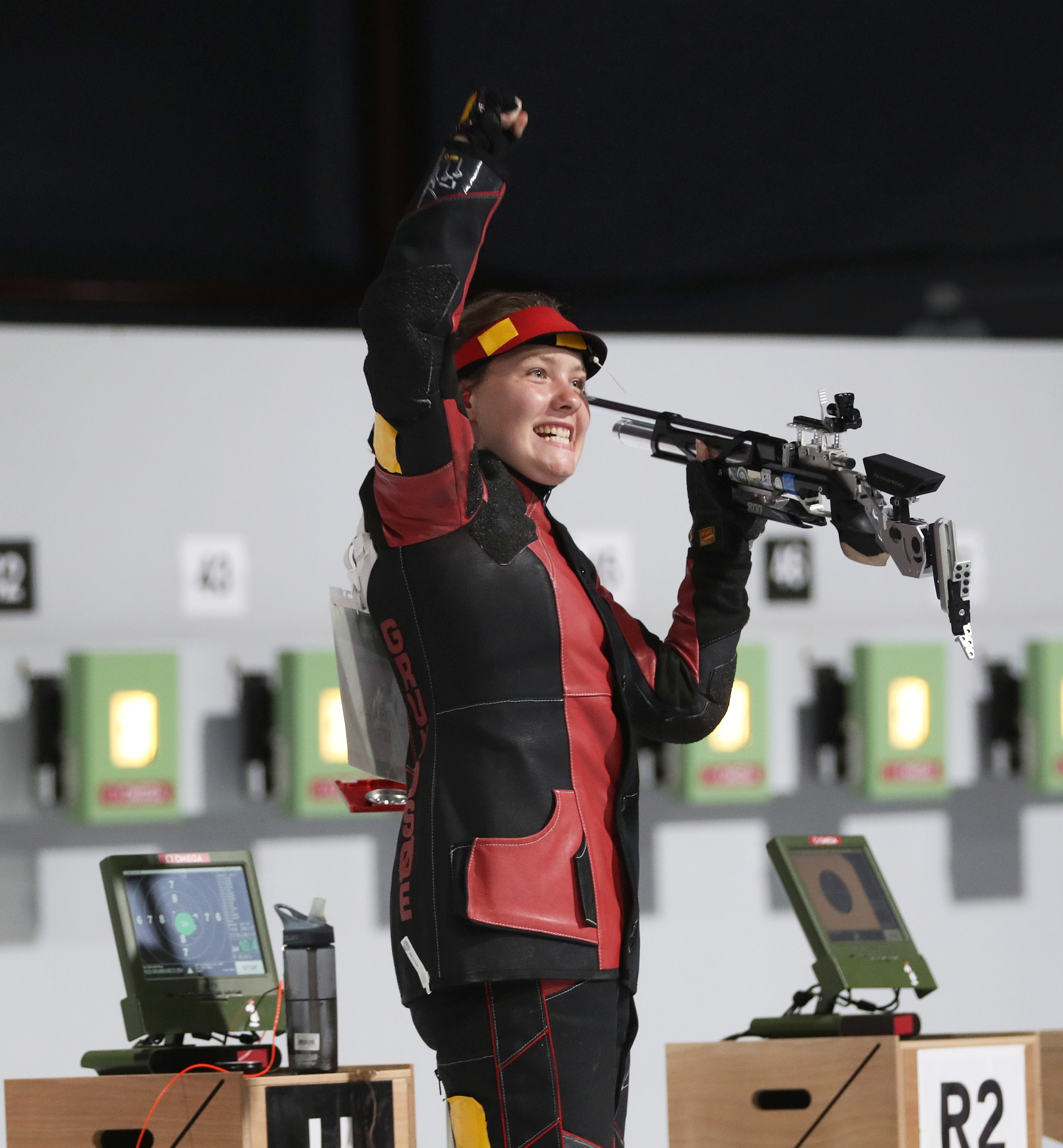
Stephanie Grundsøe celebrating her victory

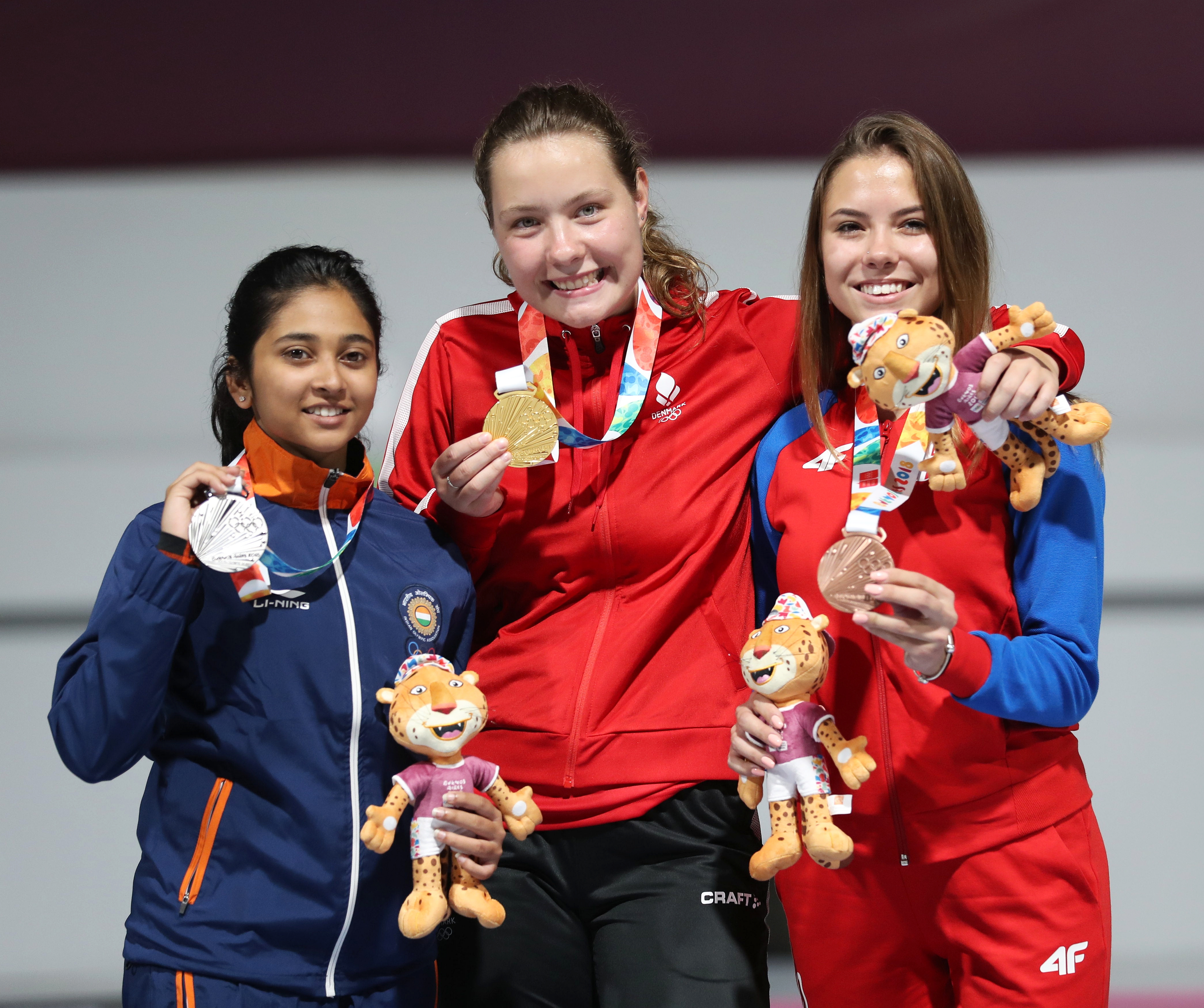
Victory ceremony
