= Triathlon at the 2018 Summer Youth Olympics – Girls' =

Girls' at the III Summer Youth Olympic Games
- Venue: Parque Polideportivo Roca
- Date: October 7
- Competitors: 32 from 32 nations

Medalists
| 1st place, gold medalist(s) | | Amber Schlebusch | South Africa |
| 2nd place, silver medalist(s) | | Sif Bendix Madsen | Denmark |
| 3rd place, bronze medalist(s) | | Anja Weber | Switzerland |

These are the results for the girls event at the 2018 Summer Youth Olympics.

== Results ==
| Rank | Triathlete | Nation | Swimming | Transit 1 | Cycling | Transit 2 | Running | Total time | Difference |
|---|---|---|---|---|---|---|---|---|---|
| 1st place, gold medalist(s) | Amber Schlebusch | South Africa | 9:59 | 0:46 | 30:17 | 0:28 | 17:15 | 58:45 | +0:00 |
| 2nd place, silver medalist(s) | Sif Bendix Madsen | Denmark | 9:55 | 0:38 | 29:37 | 0:29 | 18:17 | 58:56 | +0:11 |
| 3rd place, bronze medalist(s) | Anja Weber | Switzerland | 9:52 | 0:43 | 29:36 | 0:30 | 18:55 | 59:36 | +0:51 |
| 4 | Eva Daniels | Luxembourg | 10:02 | 0:41 | 30:12 | 0:29 | 18:25 | 59:49 | +1:04 |
| 5 | Paula Vega | Ecuador | 10:11 | 0:40 | 30:09 | 0:30 | 18:19 | 59:49 | +1:04 |
| 6 | Barbara de Koning | Netherlands | 9:58 | 0:47 | 30:17 | 0:30 | 19:00 | 1:00:32 | +1:47 |
| 7 | Emilie Noyer | France | 10:52 | 0:44 | 31:04 | 0:32 | 17:25 | 1:00:37 | +1:52 |
| 8 | Marie Horn | Germany | 9:59 | 0:44 | 30:19 | 0:31 | 19:08 | 1:00:41 | +1:56 |
| 9 | Brea Roderick | New Zealand | 10:12 | 0:39 | 30:10 | 0:28 | 19:26 | 1:00:55 | +2:10 |
| 10 | Hanne Peeters | Belgium | 10:32 | 0:41 | 31:25 | 0:27 | 17:57 | 1:01:02 | +2:17 |
| 11 | Emma Ada Middleditch | Singapore | 10:54 | 0:48 | 30:57 | 0:28 | 17:57 | 1:01:04 | +2:19 |
| 12 | Sofia Rodríguez Moreno | Mexico | 10:39 | 0:50 | 31:14 | 0:34 | 17:49 | 1:01:06 | +2:21 |
| 13 | Nikolett Ferenczi | Hungary | 10:44 | 1:03 | 30:51 | 0:29 | 18:18 | 1:01:25 | +2:40 |
| 14 | Giovanna Lacerda | Brazil | 10:33 | 0:48 | 31:18 | 0:31 | 18:17 | 1:01:27 | +2:42 |
| 15 | Alevtina Stetsenko | Russia | 10:42 | 0:38 | 31:23 | 0:29 | 18:36 | 1:01:48 | +3:03 |
| 16 | Chiara Lobba | Italy | 10:37 | 0:46 | 31:15 | 0:30 | 18:54 | 1:02:02 | +3:17 |
| 17 | Karina Clemant | Venezuela | 9:56 | 0:48 | 30:17 | 0:40 | 20:37 | 1:02:18 | +3:33 |
| 18 | Charlotte Derbyshire | Australia | 10:35 | 0:45 | 31:21 | 0:31 | 19:24 | 1:02:36 | +3:51 |
| 19 | Lee Jung-won | South Korea | 10:06 | 0:40 | 30:15 | 0:38 | 21:06 | 1:02:45 | +4:00 |
| 20 | Yu Xinying | China | 10:43 | 0:35 | 31:24 | 0:36 | 19:31 | 1:02:49 | +4:04 |
| 21 | Delfina Orlandini | Argentina | 10:21 | 0:47 | 31:33 | 0:29 | 19:54 | 1:03:04 | +4:19 |
| 22 | Ines Rico | Portugal | 10:36 | 0:42 | 31:19 | 0:32 | 20:08 | 1:03:17 | +4:32 |
| 23 | Libby Coleman | Great Britain | 10:29 | 0:49 | 31:22 | 0:32 | 20:31 | 1:03:43 | +4:58 |
| 24 | Maria Fernanda Barbosa Sánchez | Colombia | 10:47 | 0:45 | 33:04 | 0:32 | 19:18 | 1:04:26 | +5:41 |
| 25 | Maki Uchida | Japan | 9:32 | 0:55 | 32:16 | 0:32 | 22:05 | 1:05:20 | +6:35 |
| 26 | Niuska Figueredo Bringa | Cuba | 10:29 | 1:16 | 32:48 | 0:57 | 20:33 | 1:06:03 | +7:18 |
| 27 | Lo Ho Yan | Hong Kong | 10:39 | 1:04 | 32:54 | 0:32 | 20:59 | 1:06:08 | +7:23 |
| 28 | Syrine Fattoum | Tunisia | 10:52 | 0:54 | 32:52 | 0:32 | 21:01 | 1:06:11 | +7:26 |
| 29 | Enya Noel | Grenada | 10:49 | 0:53 | 32:55 | 0:38 | 22:47 | 1:08:02 | +9:17 |
| 30 | Naomi Espinoza Guablocho | Peru | 10:34 | 0:51 | 36:51 | 0:37 | 21:08 | 1:10:01 | +11:16 1P |
| | Maram Yasseer Mohamed | Egypt | 12:26 | 0:54 | | | | LAP | |
| | Maryhelen Albright | United States | | | | | | DNF | |
