= Fabian Weiss (cyclist) =

Swiss cyclist

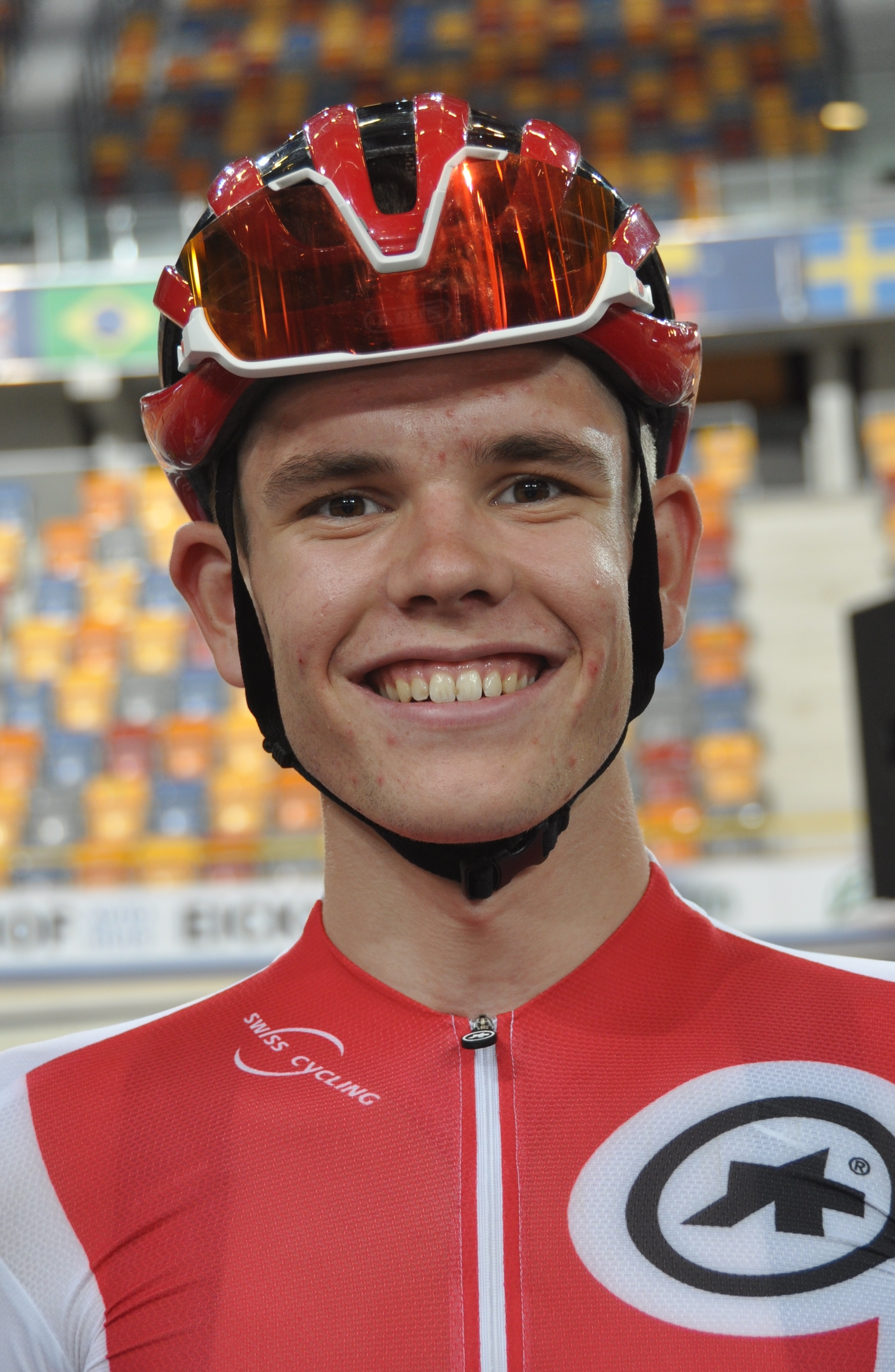
- Weiss in 2021

Personal information
- Born: 11 April 2002 (age 24) Rheinfelden (Aargau), Switzerland
- Height: 1.81 m (5 ft 11 in)

Cycling career
- Sport: Cycling
- Current team: Tudor Pro Cycling Team
- Disciplines: Road; Track
- Role: Rider

Amateur teams
- 2019: Akros–Thömus Development Team
- 2020: Humard Vélo-Passion

Professional teams
- 2021–2022: Swiss Racing Academy
- 2023–2024: Tudor Pro Cycling Team U23
- 2025–: Tudor Pro Cycling Team

Fabian Weiss (born 11 April 2002) is a Swiss cyclist, who currently rides for UCI ProTeam Tudor Pro Cycling Team.

== Major results ==
=== Road ===
2020
3rd Time trial, National Junior Championships
2022
1st Time trial, National Under-23 Championships
4th Time trial, UEC European Under-23 Championships
2023
1st Time trial, National Under-23 Championships
10th Liège–Bastogne–Liège U23
2024
National Under-23 Championships

1st Time trial
4th Road race

UEC European Under-23 Championships

5th Road race
5th Time trial

6th Overall Orlen Nations Grand Prix
2025
4th Time trial, National Championships

=== Track ===
2019
3rd Omnium, National Junior Championships
2020
3rd Elimination race, UEC European Junior Championships
2022
National Championships

2nd Madison
2nd Points race
