= Sean Flynn (cyclist) =

Scottish cyclist (born 2000)

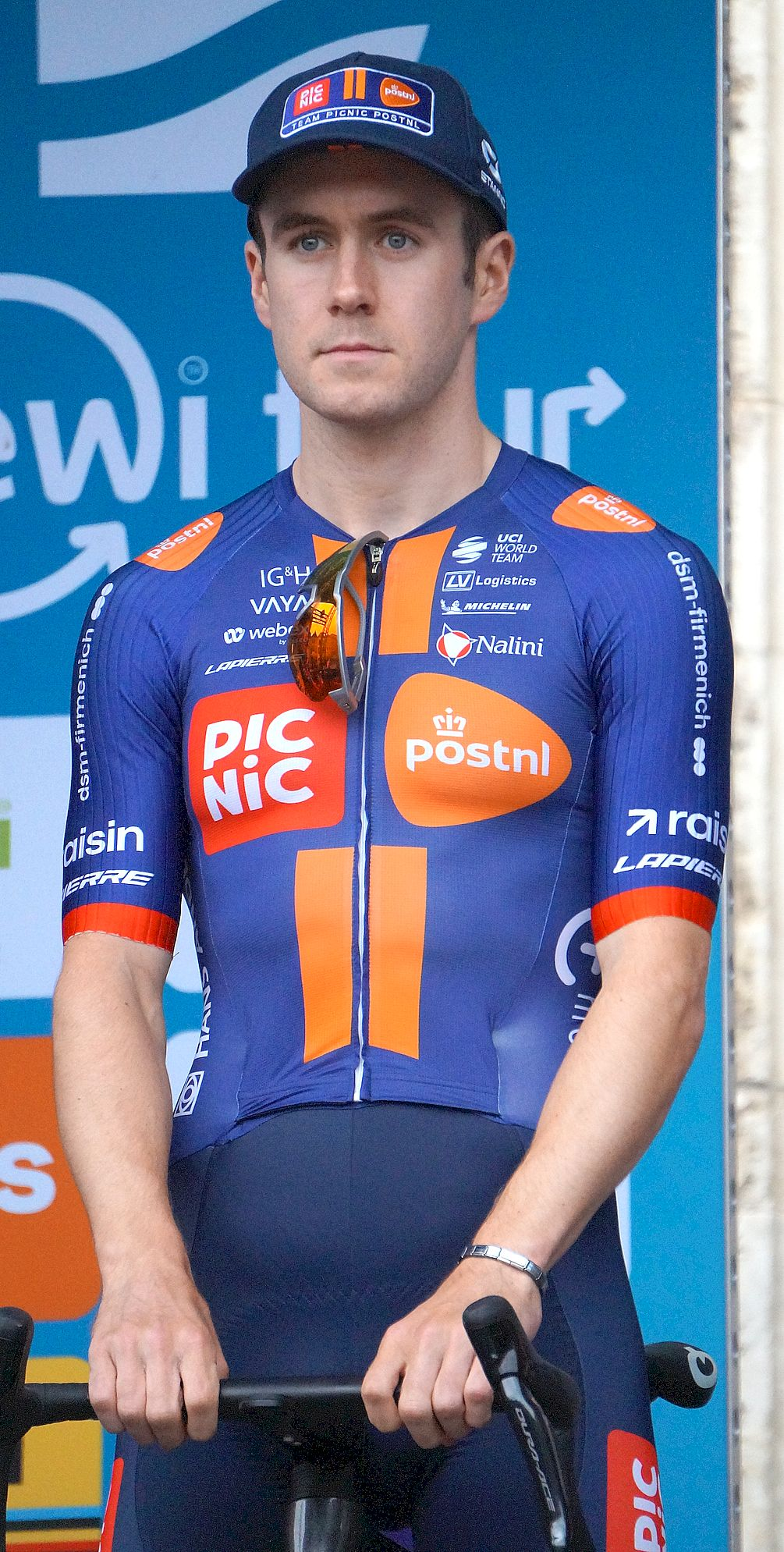
- Flynn in 2026

Personal information
- Born: 2 March 2000 (age 26) Edinburgh, Scotland
- Height: 1.77 m (5 ft 10 in)
- Weight: 67 kg (148 lb)

Cycling career
- Sport: Cycling
- Current team: Team Picnic–PostNL
- Disciplines: Road; Mountain biking; Cyclo-cross
- Role: Rider

Amateur teams
- 2011–2018: Edinburgh Road Club
- 2019–2020: Team Inspired

Professional teams
- 2021: SEG Racing Academy
- 2022: Swiss Racing Academy
- 2023–: Team dsm–firmenich

Major wins
- Grand Tours Vuelta a España 1 TTT stage (2023)

Sean Flynn (born 2 March 2000) is a Scottish cyclist, who currently rides for UCI WorldTeam Team Picnic–PostNL.

== Personal life ==
From Edinburgh, he has been in a relationship with fellow cyclist Lauren Dickson since they were both in high school.

== Major results ==
=== Road ===
2017
5th Road race, National Junior Championships
2021
8th Dorpenomloop Rucphen
2022
3rd Overall Istrian Spring Trophy

1st Stage 1

4th Overall Okolo Jižních Čech
4th Paris–Tours Espoirs
4th Strade Bianche di Romagna
5th Poreč Trophy
8th Coppa della Pace
9th Overall Le Triptyque des Monts et Châteaux
10th Road race, Commonwealth Games
2023
1st Stage 1 (TTT) Vuelta a España
8th Bredene Koksijde Classic
2024
9th Overall Danmark Rundt

1st Stage 1 (TTT)

10th Overall Tour of Britain

==== Grand Tour general classification results timeline ====
Grand Tour	2023
Giro d'Italia	—
Tour de France	—
Vuelta a España	116

Legend
—	Did not compete
DNF	Did not finish

=== Cyclo-cross ===
2017–2018
1st National Junior Championships
Junior National Trophy Series

1st Abergavenny

Junior DVV Trophy

2nd Antwerpen

UCI Junior World Cup

5th Namur

=== Mountain bike ===
2018
3rd Summer Youth Olympics (with Harry Birchill)
2018
1st Cross-country, National Junior Championships
2019
2nd Cross-country, National Under-23 Championships
