= Jacob Hindsgaul Madsen =

Danish cyclist (born 2000)

Personal information
- Full name: Jacob Hindsgaul Madsen
- Born: 14 July 2000 (age 26) Middelfart, Denmark
- Height: 1.87 m (6 ft 2 in)
- Weight: 67 kg (148 lb)

Cycling career
- Sport: Cycling
- Current team: Retired
- Discipline: Road
- Role: Rider

Professional teams
- 2019: Team ColoQuick
- 2020–2023: Uno-X Norwegian Development Team

Jacob Hindsgaul Madsen (born 14 July 2000) is a Danish cyclist, who competed as a professional from 2019 to 2023.

== Major results ==
2017
2nd Time trial, National Junior Road Championships
8th Overall Internationale Cottbuser Junioren-Etappenfahrt
10th Road race, UCI Junior Road World Championships
10th Overall Grand Prix Rüebliland
2018
1st Time trial, National Junior Road Championships
1st Overall Internationale Cottbuser Junioren-Etappenfahrt

1st Stages 2a (ITT), 2b & 3

2nd Kuurne–Brussel–Kuurne Juniors
4th Overall Course de la Paix Juniors
5th Road race, Summer Youth Olympics
8th La Route des Géants
8th E3 Harelbeke Junioren
9th Time trial, UCI Junior Road World Championships
2019
1st Prologue Giro della Valle d'Aosta
3rd GP Herning
10th Sundvolden GP
2020
1st Stage 1 (TTT) Giro del Friuli-Venezia Giulia
2nd Il Piccolo Lombardia
6th Overall Bałtyk–Karkonosze Tour
2021
6th Overall Étoile d'Or
8th Overall Tour de l'Avenir
2022
1st Overall Tour of Antalya

1st Stage 3

4th Overall Grand Prix Jeseníky
2023
6th Overall Boucles de la Mayenne

1st Mountains classification
