= David Campos (cyclist) =

Spanish cyclist (born 2000)

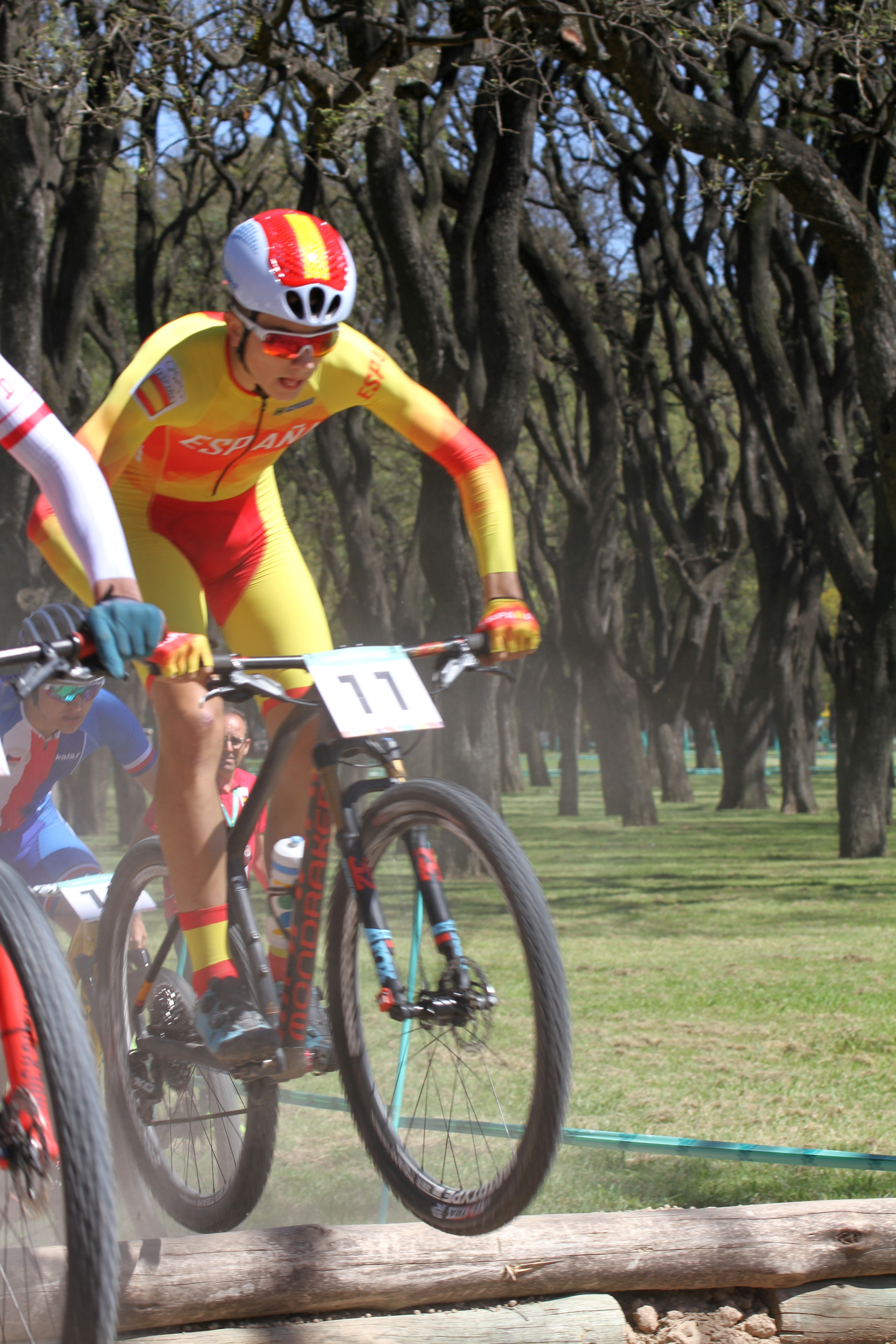
- Campos at the 2018 Summer Youth Olympics

Personal information
- Full name: David Domingo Campos Motos
- Born: 20 April 2000 (age 26)
- Height: 1.83 m (6 ft 0 in)
- Weight: 70 kg (154 lb)

Cycling career
- Sport: Cycling
- Current team: BH Coloma Team
- Discipline: Mountain bike
- Role: Rider
- Rider type: Cross-country

Professional teams
- 2019–2020: Primaflor Mondraker Rotor
- 2021–2022: BH Templo Cafés UCC
- 2023–2024: Orbea Factory Team
- 2025-: BH Coloma Team
Medal record
Men's mountain bike racing
Representing Spain
European Championships
| Gold medal – first place | 2023 Anadia | Cross-country short track |
| Silver medal – second place | 2022 Anadia | Cross-country short track |

David Domingo Campos Motos (born 20 April 2000) is a Spanish cross-country mountain biker, who currently rides for UCI Mountain Bike team Orbea Factory Team.

== Major results ==
2020
2nd Cross-country, National Under-23 Championships
2021
National Championships

1st Cross-country eliminator
2nd Under-23 cross-country

2022
2nd Cross-country short track, European Championships
3rd Overall UCI Under-23 XCO World Cup

2nd Mont-Sainte-Anne
2nd Val di Sole

2023
1st Cross-country short track, European Championships
