= Petr Kelemen =

Czech cyclist (born 2000)

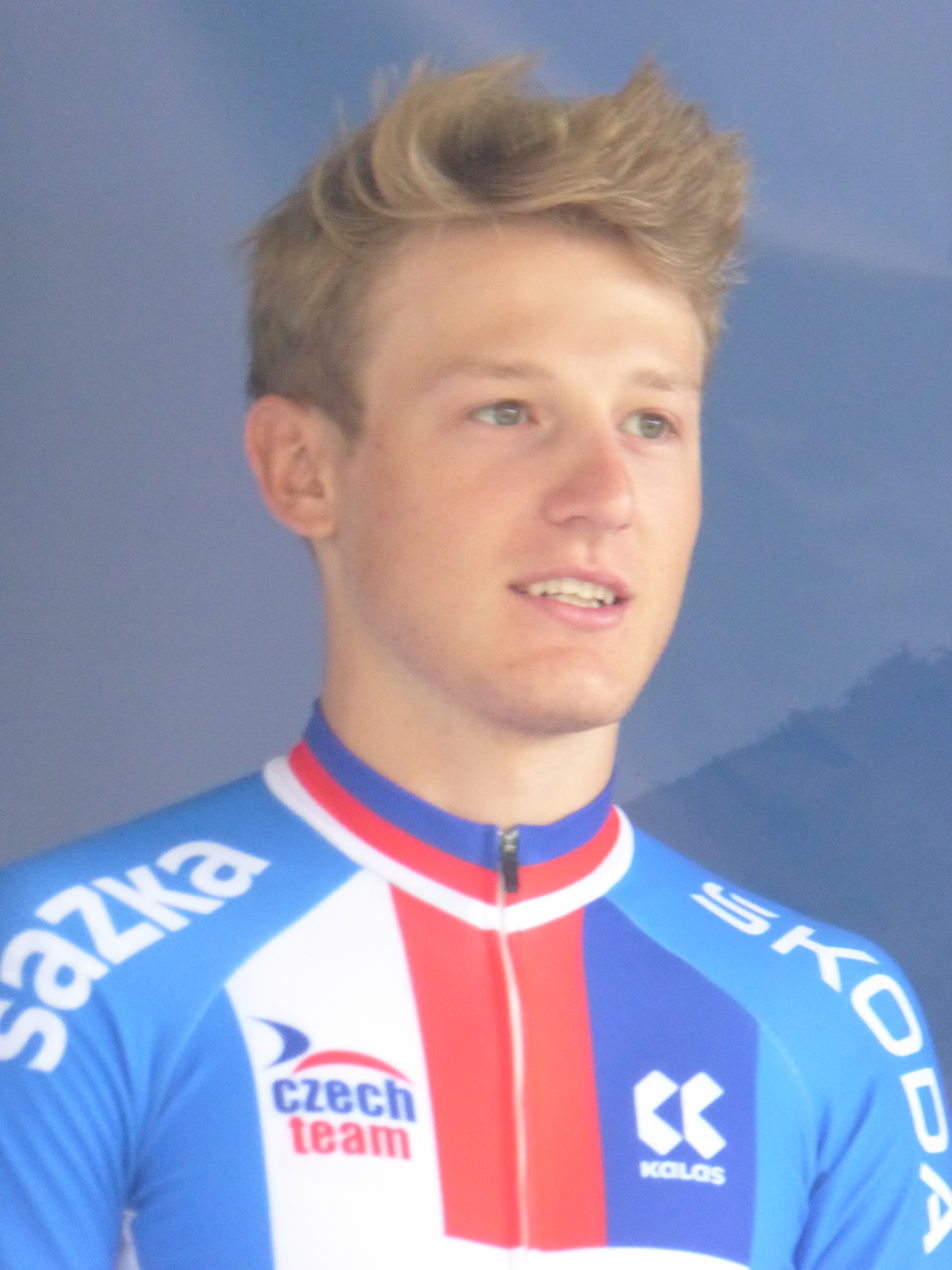
- Kelemen in 2023

Personal information
- Born: 18 November 2000 (age 25)
- Height: 1.9 m (6 ft 3 in)
- Weight: 70 kg (154 lb)

Cycling career
- Sport: Cycling
- Current team: Tudor Pro Cycling Team
- Disciplines: Road; Track
- Role: Rider

Amateur team
- 2019: World Cycling Centre

Professional teams
- 2020: CCC Development Team
- 2021: Elkov–Kasper
- 2022–: Swiss Racing Academy

Petr Kelemen (born 18 November 2000) is a Czech track and road cyclist, who currently rides for UCI ProTeam Tudor Pro Cycling Team.

== Major results ==
2018
National Junior Road Championships

1st Road race
2nd Time trial

1st Points classification, Tour du Pays de Vaud
2020
2nd Time trial, National Under-23 Road Championships
8th Overall Dookoła Mazowsza
2021
3rd Overall Dookoła Mazowsza
8th GP Slovenian Istria
2022
National Under-23 Road Championships

1st Road race
2nd Time trial

2nd Strade Bianche di Romagna
4th La Maurienne
2023
10th Grand Prix La Marseillaise
2025
5th Time trial, National Road Championships
