= Luxembourg at the 2018 Summer Youth Olympics =

- IOC code: LUX
- NOC: Luxembourgish Olympic and Sporting Committee
- Website: http://teamletzebuerg.lu/

in Buenos Aires, Argentina 6 – 18 October 2018
- Competitors: 10 in 5 sports
- Medals Ranked 79th: Gold 0 Silver 1 Bronze 0 Total 1

Summer Youth Olympics appearances
- 2010; 2014; 2018

Luxembourg participated at the 2018 Summer Youth Olympics in Buenos Aires, Argentina from 6 October to 18 October 2018.

== Cycling ==
Luxembourg qualified a boys' and girls' combined team based on its ranking in the Youth Olympic Games Junior Nation Rankings.

- Boys' combined team - 1 team of 2 athletes
- Girls' combined team - 1 team of 2 athletes

Athlete	Event	Team time trial			Road race			XC eliminator		XC short circuit			Criterium				Total	
Athlete	Event	Time	Rank	Points	Time	Rank	Points	Rank	Points	Time	Rank	Points	Laps	Sprint pts	Rank	Points	Points	Rank
Arthur Kluckers	Boys' combined team	8:30.59	2	80	1:30:58	2	80	22	1	20:18	8	0	16	0	23	0	276	2nd place, silver medalist(s)
Nicolas Kess	Boys' combined team	8:30.59	2	80	1:32:39	35	0	16	0	19:35	3	65	16	5	4	50	276	2nd place, silver medalist(s)
Laetitia Maus	Girls' combined team	10:31.60	18	0	1:42:39	29	0	2:08.337	0	17:20	26	0	6	DNF		0	0	19
Nina Berton	Girls' combined team	10:31.60	18	0	1:43:05	33	0	2:02.466	0	16:40	23	0	16	0	30	0	0	19

== Tennis ==
Singles

Athlete	Event	Round of 32	Round of 16	Quarterfinals	Semifinals	Final / BM	
Athlete	Event	Opposition Score	Opposition Score	Opposition Score	Opposition Score	Opposition Score	Rank
E Molinaro	Girls' singles	I Świątek (POL); L 1-6, 4-6	did not advance				

Doubles

Athletes	Event	Round of 32	Round of 16	Quarterfinals	Semifinals	Final / BM	
Athletes	Event	Opposition Score	Opposition Score	Opposition Score	Opposition Score	Opposition Score	Rank
F Curmi (MLT); E Molinaro (LUX)	Girls' doubles	C Burel (FRA); D Parry (FRA); L 4-6, 6-3, 5-10	did not advance				
E Molinaro (LUX); J de Jong (NED)	Mixed doubles	M Bilokin (UKR); Y Erel (TUR); W 6-1, 6-3	E Cocciaretto (ITA); L Musetti (ITA); W 4-6, 6-2, 12-10	L Sun (SUI); D Wenger (SUI); L 4-6, 6-3, 10-12	did not advance		

== Triathlon ==
Luxembourg qualified one athlete based on its performance at the 2018 European Youth Olympic Games Qualifier.

Individual

Athlete	Event	Swim (750m)	Trans 1	Bike (20 km)	Trans 2	Run (5 km)	Total Time	Rank
Eva Daniels	Girls	10:02	0:41	30:12	0:29	18:25	59:49	4

Relay

Athlete	Event	Total Times per Athlete (Swim 250m, Bike 6.6 km, Run 1.8 km)	Total Group Time	Rank
Europe 2 Eva Daniels (LUX); Andreas Carlsson (SWE); Barbara de Koning (NED); Baptiste Passemard (FRA)	Mixed Relay	22:24 (4) - - -	DNF	
