= Harry Birchill =

English cyclist (born 2001)

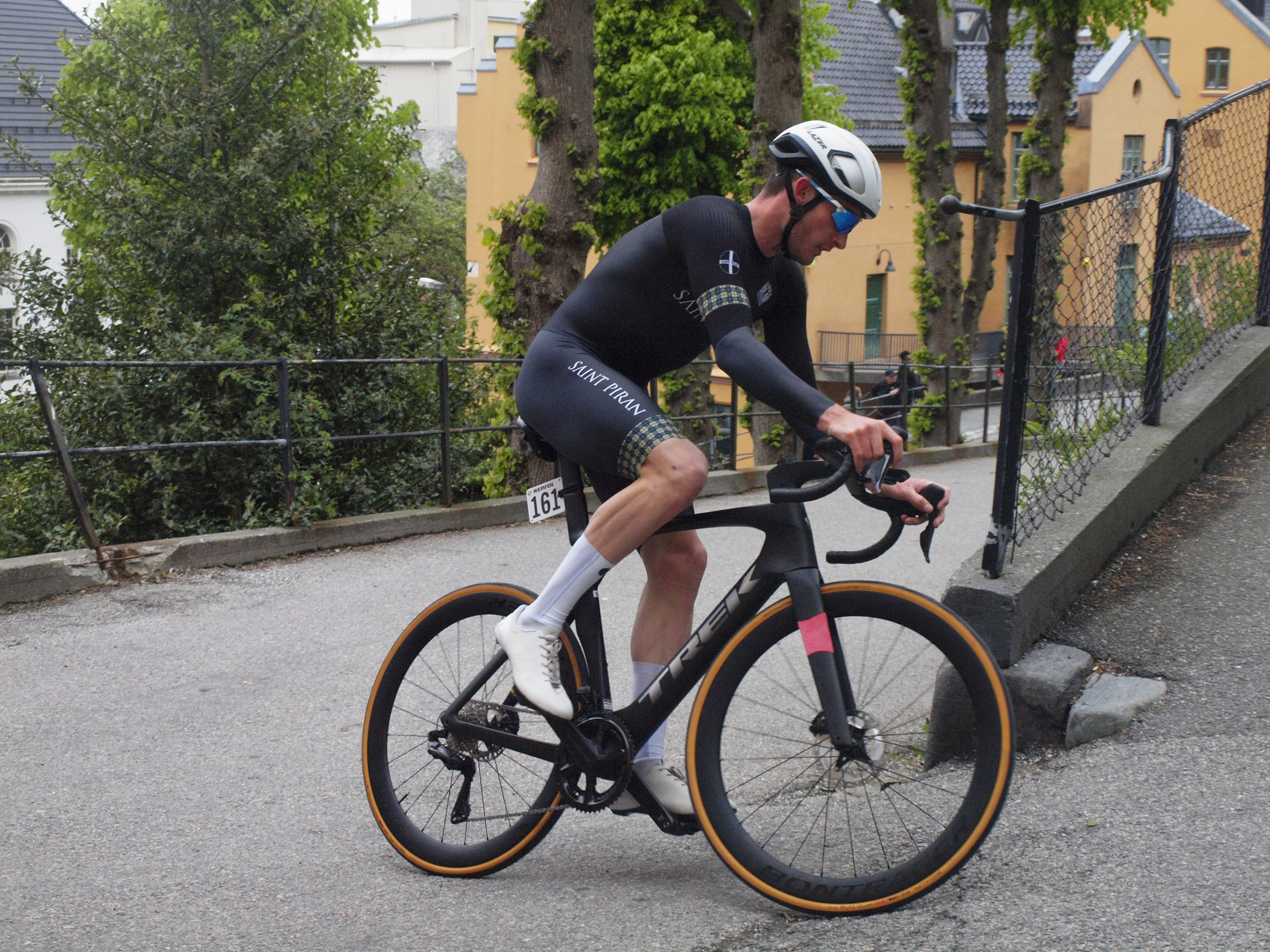
- Birchill at the 2023 Tour of Norway

Personal information
- Born: 1 January 2001 (age 25) Torquay, Devon, England

Cycling career
- Sport: Cycling
- Current team: Saint Piran
- Disciplines: Mountain biking; Road
- Role: Rider

Amateur teams
- 2019: Ridley–Hermans DT
- 2022: Team Inspired

Professional teams
- 2022: Saint Piran (stagiaire)
- 2023–: Saint Piran

Harry Birchill (born 1 January 2001) is an English cyclist, who currently rides for UCI Continental team Saint Piran. He has represented England at the Commonwealth Games.

== Biography ==
Birchill won the Under-23 title cross country at the 2021 National Championships in Plymouth. He rode for Team Inspired in 2022 before joining UCI Continental team Saint Piran in 2023.

In 2022, he was selected for the 2022 Commonwealth Games in Birmingham, where he competed in the men's mountain biking cross country and finished in 8th place.

== Major results ==
=== Mountain bike ===
2018
3rd Summer Youth Olympics (with Sean Flynn)
2019
1st Cross-country, National Junior Championships
3rd Cross-country, UEC European Junior Championships
2021
1st Cross-country, National Under-23 Championships

=== Road ===
2022
8th Rutland–Melton CiCLE Classic
2023
2nd Muur Classic Geraardsbergen
6th Lincoln Grand Prix
