= Nils Brun =

Swiss cyclist (born 2000)

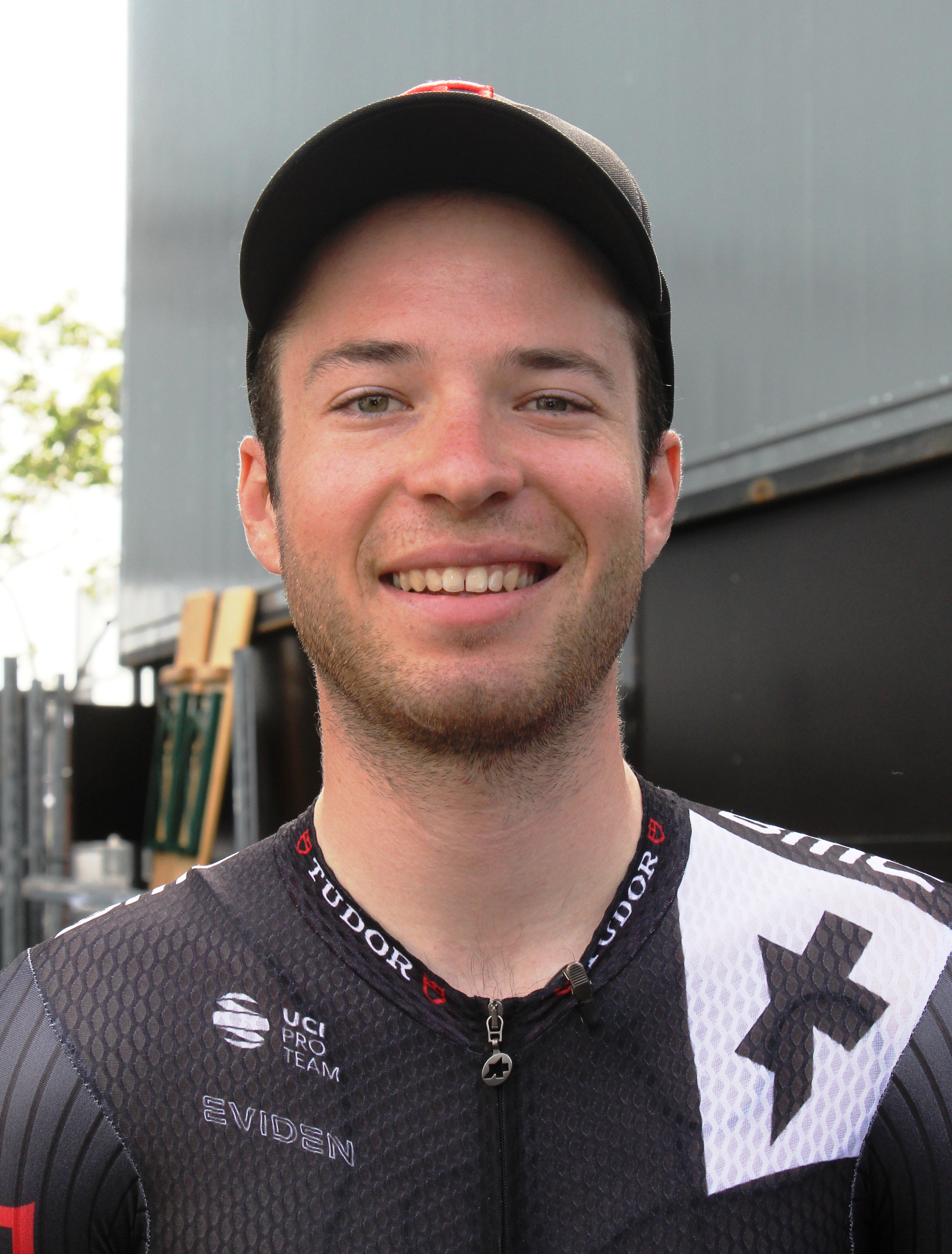
- Brun in 2023

Personal information
- Born: 24 June 2000 (age 26)
- Weight: 64 kg (141 lb)

Cycling career
- Sport: Cycling
- Current team: MYVELO Pro Cycling Team
- Disciplines: Road; Mountain biking (former)
- Role: Rider

Amateur teams
- 2019: BigFriends.ch
- 2020–2021: Swiss MTB Pro Team powered by Stoll

Professional teams
- 2022–2024: Swiss Racing Academy
- 2025–: MYVELO Pro Cycling Team

Nils Brun (born 24 June 2000) is a Swiss cyclist, who currently rides for UCI Continental team MYVELO Pro Cycling Team.

== Major results ==
2017
5th Time trial, National Junior Road Championships
2018
3rd Time trial, National Junior Road Championships
2022
National Under-23 Road Championships

1st Road race
2nd Time trial

6th La Maurienne
