= Alexander Andersen =

Danish cyclist (born 2000)

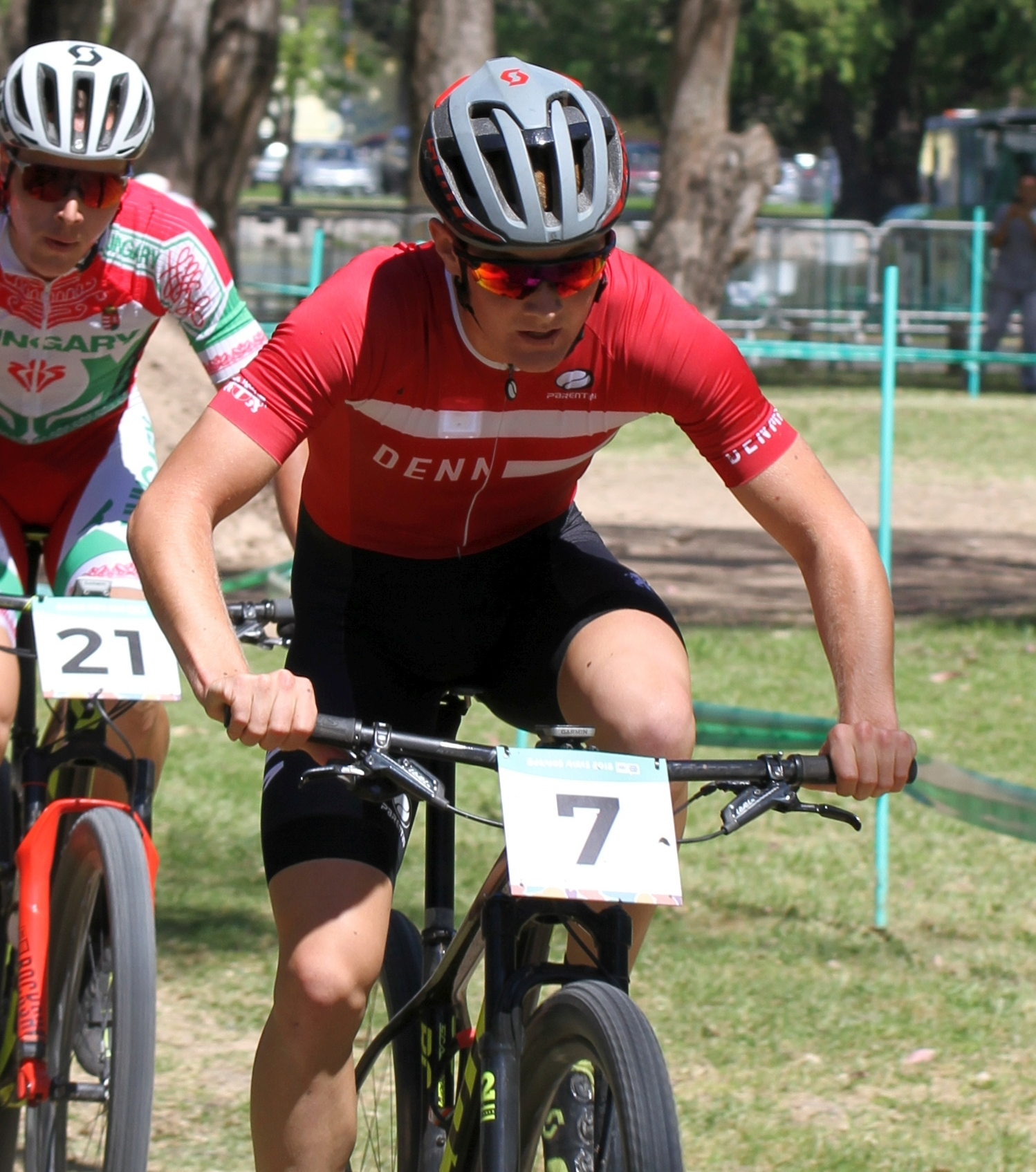
- Andersen at the 2018 Summer Youth Olympics

Personal information
- Full name: Alexander Young Andersen
- Born: 25 February 2000 (age 26)

Cycling career
- Sport: Cycling
- Discipline: Cross-country mountain biking
- Role: Rider
Medal record
World Championships
Silver medal – second place	2017 Darfo Boario Terme	Team relay
Bronze medal – third place	2018 Lenzerheide	Team relay

Alexander Young Andersen (born 25 February 2000) is a Danish cross-country cyclist.

He competed at the 2018 UCI Mountain Bike World Championships, winning a medal.

== Major results ==
2017
3rd Team relay, UCI World Championships
2nd Team relay, UEC European Championships
2019
3rd Team relay, UCI World Championships
3rd Team relay, UEC European Championships
2020
3rd Cross-country, National Championships
