= Ethiopia at the 2018 Summer Youth Olympics =

- IOC code: ETH
- NOC: Ethiopian Olympic Committee
- Website: http://ethiopianolympic.org/

in Buenos Aires, Argentina 6 – 18 October 2018
- Competitors: 11 in 2 sports
- Medals Ranked 33rd: Gold 2 Silver 2 Bronze 4 Total 8

Summer Youth Olympics appearances
- 2010; 2014; 2018

Ethiopia participated at the 2018 Summer Youth Olympics in Buenos Aires, Argentina from 6 October to 18 October 2018.

== Medalists ==
Medal	Name	Sport	Event	Date
Gold	Abrham Sime	Athletics	Boys' 2000 m steeplechase	15 October
Gold	Tasew Yada	Athletics	Boys' 800 m	15 October
Silver	Mekides Abebe	Athletics	Girls' 2000 m steeplechase	14 October
Silver	Berihu Aregawi	Athletics	Boys' 3000 m	15 October
Bronze	Hirut Meshesha	Athletics	Girls' 800 m	14 October
Bronze	Abersh Minsewo Belay	Athletics	Girls' 3000 m	15 October
Bronze	Lemlem Hailu	Athletics	Girls' 1500 m	15 October
Bronze	Melese Nberet	Athletics	Boys' 1500 m	15 October

== Competitors ==
Sport	Boys	Girls	Total
Athletics	4	5	9
Cycling	0	2	2

== Athletics ==
Boys

Athlete	Event	Stage 1		Stage 2		Total	
Athlete	Event	Result	Rank	Result	Rank	Total	Rank
Tasew Yada	Boys' 800 m	1:49.38	1	1:50.38	1	3:39.76	1st place, gold medalist(s)
Melese Nberet	Boys' 1500 m	3:52.95	1	11:38	7	15:30.95	3rd place, bronze medalist(s)
Berihu Aregawi	Boys' 3000 m	8:09.17	2	11:13	2	19:22.17	2nd place, silver medalist(s)
Abrham Sime	Boys' 2000 m steeplechase	5:34.94	1	11:51	9	17:25.94	1st place, gold medalist(s)

Girls

Athlete	Event	Stage 1		Stage 2		Total	
Athlete	Event	Result	Rank	Result	Rank	Total	Rank
Hirut Meshesha	Girls' 800 m	2:08.35	1	2:06.25	3	4:14.60	3rd place, bronze medalist(s)
Lemlem Hailu	Girls' 1500 m	4:25.03	1	13:11	5	17:36.03	3rd place, bronze medalist(s)
Aberash Minsewo	Girls' 3000 m	9:14.99	3	13:12	6	22:26.99	3rd place, bronze medalist(s)
Mekides Abebe	Girls' 2000 m steeplechase	6:27.93	2	13:21	11	19:48.93	2nd place, silver medalist(s)
Sintayehu Masire	Girls' 5000 m race walk	25:45.77	14	25:21.85	9	51:07.62	9

== Cycling ==
Ethiopia qualified a girls' combined team based on its ranking in the Youth Olympic Games Junior Nation Rankings.

- Girls' combined team - 1 team of 2 athletes

Combined team

Athlete	Event	Time trial			Road race			Cross-country Eliminator		Cross-country Short circuit		Criterium		Total points	Rank
Athlete	Event	Time	Rank	Points	Time	Rank	Points	Rank	Points	Rank	Points	Rank	Points	Total points	Rank
Zayid Hailu	Girls' combined team	10:31.40	17	0	1:42.19	16	1	31	0	16	0	10	10	11	17
Tsadkan Kasahun	Girls' combined team	10:31.40	17	0	1:42.19	19	0	33	0	17	0	28	0	11	17
