= Athletics at the 2018 Summer Youth Olympics – Girls' 3000 metres =

Girls' 3000 metres at the III Summer Youth Olympic Games
- Venue: Parque Polideportivo Roca
- Date: 11 October and 15 October 2018
- Competitors: 21 from 21 nations

Medalists
1st place, gold medalist(s)		Sarah Chelangat	Uganda
2nd place, silver medalist(s)		Mercy Chepkorir Kerarei	Kenya
3rd place, bronze medalist(s)		Aberash Minsewo	Ethiopia

The girls' 3000 metres competition at the 2018 Summer Youth Olympics was held on 11 and 15 October, at the Parque Polideportivo Roca.

== Schedule ==
All times are in local time (UTC-3).

Date	Time	Round
11 October 2018	15:05	Stage 1
15 October 2018	10:30	Cross Country

== Results ==
=== Stage 1 ===
Rank	Athlete	Nation	Result	Notes
1	Sarah Chelangat	Uganda	9:11.63	PB
2	Mercy Chepkorir Kerarei	Kenya	9:13.59	
3	Aberash Minsewo	Ethiopia	9:14.99	
4	Carmie Prinsloo	South Africa	9:18.92	PB
5	Miyaka Sugata	Japan	9:21.16	SB
6	Cameron Ormond	Canada	9:24.52	PB
7	Hannah O'Connor	New Zealand	9:25.29	PB
8	Alessia Zarbo	France	9:26.56	
9	Kisanet Mariskos Hidru	Eritrea	9:26.57	PB
10	İnci Kalkan	Turkey	9:26.59	
11	Vasileia Spyrou	Greece	9:49.87	
12	Odile Nintije	Burundi	9:54.30	PB
13	Ángela Freitas	Timor-Leste	10:00.36	PB
14	Seema Seema	India	10:03.34	
15	Maria Ascanio	Venezuela	10:08.13	PB
16	Linn Kleine	Germany	10:11.07	
17	Moneyi Chingaipe	Malawi	10:24.80	PB
18	Bernadette Bingonda	Democratic Republic of the Congo	10:35.97	PB
19	Gözel Çopanowa	Turkmenistan	10:55.75	
20	Malineo Adelina Mofolo	Lesotho	11:07.40	
21	Abdoulaye Ramatou	Niger	11:33.17	

=== Cross Country ===
Rank	Overall rank	Athlete	Nation	Result	Notes
1	1	Sarah Chelangat	Uganda	12:32	
2	4	Mercy Chepkorir Kerarei	Kenya	12:37	
3	6	Aberash Minsewo	Ethiopia	12:51	
4	10	Kisanet Mariskos Hidru	Eritrea	13:17	
5	12	Alessia Zarbo	France	13:21	
6	13	Carmie Prinsloo	South Africa	13:33	
7	15	Cameron Ormond	Canada	13:35	
8	19	İnci Kalkan	Turkey	13:51	
9	20	Hannah O'Connor	New Zealand	13:51	
10	21	Odile Nintije	Burundi	13:55	
11	23	Miyaka Sugata	Japan	13:59	
12	32	Seema Seema	India	14:25	
13	35	Vasileia Spyrou	Greece	14:31	
14	42	Bernadette Bingonda	Democratic Republic of the Congo	14:53	
15	44	Linn Kleine	Germany	14:57	
16	45	Moneyi Chingaipe	Malawi	15:03	
17	47	Maria Ascanio	Venezuela	15:10	
19	49	Malineo Adelina Mofolo	Lesotho	15:44	
		Ángela Freitas	Timor-Leste	DNS	
		Gözel Çopanowa	Turkmenistan	DNS	
		Abdoulaye Ramatou	Niger	DNS	

=== Final placing ===
Rank	Athlete	Nation	Stage 1	Cross Country	Total
1st place, gold medalist(s)	Sarah Chelangat	Uganda	1	1	2
2nd place, silver medalist(s)	Mercy Chepkorir Kerarei	Kenya	2	2	4
3rd place, bronze medalist(s)	Aberash Minsewo	Ethiopia	3	3	6
4	Carmie Prinsloo	South Africa	4	6	10
5	Kisanet Mariskos Hidru	Eritrea	9	4	13
6	Alessia Zarbo	France	8	5	13
7	Cameron Ormond	Canada	6	7	13
8	Hannah O'Connor	New Zealand	7	9	16
9	Miyaka Sugata	Japan	5	11	16
10	İnci Kalkan	Turkey	10	8	18
11	Odile Nintije	Burundi	12	10	22
12	Vasileia Spyrou	Greece	11	13	24
13	Seema Seema	India	14	12	26
14	Linn Kleine	Germany	16	15	31
15	Bernadette Bingonda	Democratic Republic of the Congo	18	14	32
16	Maria Ascanio	Venezuela	15	17	32
17	Moneyi Chingaipe	Malawi	17	16	33
18	Malineo Adelina Mofolo	Lesotho	20	18	38
	Ángela Freitas	Timor-Leste	13	DNS	
	Gözel Çopanowa	Turkmenistan	19	DNS	
	Abdoulaye Ramatou	Niger	21	DNS	
