= Athletics at the 2018 Summer Youth Olympics – Boys' 2000 metre steeplechase =

Boys' 2000 metre steeplechase at the III Summer Youth Olympic Games
- Venue: Parque Polideportivo Roca
- Date: 12 October and 15 October 2018
- Competitors: 18 from 18 nations

Medalists
1st place, gold medalist(s)		Abrham Sime	Ethiopia
2nd place, silver medalist(s)		Baptiste Guyon	France
3rd place, bronze medalist(s)		Abel Yamane	Eritrea

The boys' 2000 metre steeplechase competition at the 2018 Summer Youth Olympics was held on 12 and 15 October, at the Parque Polideportivo Roca.

== Schedule ==
All times are in local time (UTC-3).

Date	Time	Round
12 October 2018	15:10	Stage 1
15 October 2018	10:00	Cross Country

== Results ==
=== Stage 1 ===
Rank	Athlete	Nation	Result	Notes
1	Abrham Sime	Ethiopia	5:34.94	PB
2	Ahmed Sayf Kadri	Tunisia	5:44.56	PB
3	Louis Vandermessen	Belgium	5:46.07	PB
4	Eemil Helander	Finland	5:46.41	PB
5	Abel Yamane	Eritrea	5:47.71	
6	Baptiste Guyon	France	5:50.18	
7	Denis Mutuku Matheka	Kenya	5:50.54	
8	Pol Oriach	Spain	5:51.67	
9	Ondrej Hodboď	Czech Republic	5:51.78	
10	Lê Tiến Long	Vietnam	5:51.79	PB
11	Cesar Daniel Gómez Ponce	Mexico	5:53.05	PB
12	Murdoch McIntyre	New Zealand	5:55.07	PB
13	Skyler York	Canada	5:57.90	PB
14	Etson Barros	Portugal	6:03.72	
15	Carmelo Cannizzaro	Italy	6:07.10	
	Mohammed Al-Suleimani	Oman	DNF	
	Hamza Sekhmani	Morocco	DNF	
	Farhan Mohamed Ibrahim	Djibouti	DQ	R 163.3a

=== Cross Country ===
Rank	Overall rank	Athlete	Nation	Result	Notes
1	9	Abrham Sime	Ethiopia	11:51	
2	11	Baptiste Guyon	France	11:53	
3	14	Denis Mutuku Matheka	Kenya	11:55	
4	15	Abel Yamane	Eritrea	11:56	
5	17	Murdoch McIntyre	New Zealand	12:03	
6	20	Pol Oriach	Spain	12:12	
7	21	Cesar Daniel Gómez Ponce	Mexico	12:14	
8	23	Ahmed Sayf Kadri	Tunisia	12:15	
9	24	Eemil Helander	Finland	12:15	
10	25	Farhan Mohamed Ibrahim	Djibouti	12:22	
11	30	Etson Barros	Portugal	12:33	
12	31	Louis Vandermessen	Belgium	12:34	
13	32	Skyler York	Canada	12:35	
14	38	Lê Tiến Long	Vietnam	12:44	
15	43	Ondrej Hodboď	Czech Republic	12:52	
		Carmelo Cannizzaro	Italy	DNF	
		Mohammed Al-Suleimani	Oman	DNS	
		Hamza Sekhmani	Morocco	DNS	

=== Final placing ===
Rank	Athlete	Nation	Stage 1	Cross Country	Total
1st place, gold medalist(s)	Abrham Sime	Ethiopia	1	1	2
2nd place, silver medalist(s)	Baptiste Guyon	France	6	2	8
3rd place, bronze medalist(s)	Abel Yamane	Eritrea	5	4	9
4	Denis Mutuku Matheka	Kenya	7	3	10
5	Ahmed Sayf Kadri	Tunisia	2	8	10
6	Eemil Helander	Finland	4	9	13
7	Pol Oriach	Spain	8	6	14
8	Louis Vandermessen	Belgium	3	12	15
9	Murdoch McIntyre	New Zealand	12	5	17
10	Cesar Daniel Gómez Ponce	Mexico	11	7	18
11	Lê Tiến Long	Vietnam	10	14	24
12	Ondrej Hodboď	Czech Republic	9	15	24
13	Etson Barros	Portugal	14	11	25
14	Skyler York	Canada	13	13	26
	Carmelo Cannizzaro	Italy	15	DNF	
	Farhan Mohamed Ibrahim	Djibouti	DQ	10	
	Mohammed Al-Suleimani	Oman	DNF	DNS	
	Hamza Sekhmani	Morocco	DNF	DNS	
