= Athletics at the 2018 Summer Youth Olympics – Girls' 2000 metre steeplechase =

Girls' 2000 metre steeplechase at the III Summer Youth Olympic Games
- Venue: Parque Polideportivo Roca
- Date: 12 October and 15 October 2018
- Competitors: 18 from 18 nations

Medalists
1st place, gold medalist(s)		Fancy Cherono	Kenya
2nd place, silver medalist(s)		Mekides Abebe	Ethiopia
3rd place, bronze medalist(s)		Parami Wasanthi Maristela	Sri Lanka

The girls' 2000 metre steeplechase competition at the 2018 Summer Youth Olympics was held on 12 and 15 October, at the Parque Polideportivo Roca.

== Schedule ==
All times are in local time (UTC-3).

Date	Time	Round
12 October 2018	15:25	Stage 1
15 October 2018	10:30	Cross Country

== Results ==
=== Stage 1 ===
Rank	Athlete	Nation	Result	Notes
1	Fancy Cherono	Kenya	6:26.08	
2	Mekides Abebe	Ethiopia	6:27.93	
3	Parami Wasanthi Maristela	Sri Lanka	6:33.06	PB
4	Lena Lebrun	France	6:36.44	
5	Jamie Hiscock	Australia	6:39.62	
6	Paula Schneiders	Germany	6:44.20	
7	María González	Spain	6:46.27	
8	Esther Yego Chekwemoi	Uganda	6:46.27	
9	Zita Urban	Hungary	6:49.52	PB
10	Pinja Kotinurmi	Finland	6:50.97	
11	Arian Iveth Chia Hernández	Mexico	6:52.87	PB
12	Barbara Neiva	Portugal	6:55.69	PB
13	Daniela Vasile	Romania	6:55.73	
14	Katerina Onisimova	Ukraine	7:00.85	
15	Berfin Bariser	Turkey	7:02.97	
16	Letícia Belo	Brazil	7:14.83	PB
17	Meredith Boyer	Canada	7:18.55	
	Galina Panassenko	Kazakhstan	DNF	

=== Cross Country ===
Rank	Overall rank	Athlete	Nation	Result	Notes
1	3	Fancy Cherono	Kenya	12:51	
2	7	Esther Yego Chekwemoi	Uganda	13:13	
3	11	Mekides Abebe	Ethiopia	13:21	
4	17	Parami Wasanthi Maristela	Sri Lanka	13:47	
5	26	Jamie Hiscock	Australia	14:04	
6	27	Pinja Kotinurmi	Finland	14:04	
7	28	Paula Schneiders	Germany	14:06	
8	30	Lena Lebrun	France	14:23	
9	31	María González	Spain	14:24	
10	33	Katerina Onisimova	Ukraine	14:25	
11	34	Daniela Vasile	Romania	14:28	
12	40	Zita Urban	Hungary	14:46	
13	41	Letícia Belo	Brazil	14:48	
14	43	Arian Iveth Chia Hernández	Mexico	14:56	
15	46	Berfin Bariser	Turkey	15:05	
16	48	Barbara Neiva	Portugal	15:28	
17	50	Meredith Boyer	Canada	15:49	
		Galina Panassenko	Kazakhstan	DNS	

=== Final placing ===
Rank	Athlete	Nation	Stage 1	Cross Country	Total
1st place, gold medalist(s)	Fancy Cherono	Kenya	1	1	2
2nd place, silver medalist(s)	Mekides Abebe	Ethiopia	2	3	5
3rd place, bronze medalist(s)	Parami Wasanthi Maristela	Sri Lanka	3	4	7
4	Esther Yego Chekwemoi	Uganda	8	2	10
5	Jamie Hiscock	Australia	5	5	10
6	Lena Lebrun	France	4	8	12
7	Paula Schneiders	Germany	6	7	13
8	Pinja Kotinurmi	Finland	10	6	16
9	María González	Spain	7	9	16
10	Zita Urban	Hungary	9	12	21
11	Katerina Onisimova	Ukraine	14	10	24
12	Daniela Vasile	Romania	13	11	24
13	Arian Iveth Chia Hernández	Mexico	11	14	25
14	Barbara Neiva	Portugal	12	16	28
15	Letícia Belo	Brazil	16	13	29
16	Berfin Bariser	Turkey	15	15	30
17	Meredith Boyer	Canada	17	17	34
	Galina Panassenko	Kazakhstan	DNF	DNS	
