= Athletics at the 2018 Summer Youth Olympics – Boys' 800 metres =

Boys' 800 metres at the III Summer Youth Olympic Games
- Venue: Parque Polideportivo Roca
- Date: 13 October and 15 October 2018
- Competitors: 25 from 25 nations

Medalists
1st place, gold medalist(s)		Tasew Yada	Ethiopia
2nd place, silver medalist(s)		Mohamed Ali Gouaned	Algeria
3rd place, bronze medalist(s)		Mehmet Çelik	Turkey

The boys' 800 metres competition at the 2018 Summer Youth Olympics was held on 13 and 15 October, at the Parque Polideportivo Roca.

== Schedule ==
All times are in local time (UTC-3).

Date	Time	Round
13 October 2018	16:45	Stage 1
15 October 2018	15:20	Stage 2

== Results ==
=== Stage 1 ===
Rank	Heat	Lane	Athlete	Nation	Result	Notes
1	3	4	Tasew Yada	Ethiopia	1:49.38	QH3
2	3	7	Mohamed Ali Gouaned	Algeria	1:50.08	QH3, PB
3	1	5	Mehmet Çelik	Turkey	1:50.83	QH3
4	1	8	Francis Leshoo Pesi	Kenya	1:50.85	QH3
5	3	5	Hamze Ali Hassan	Djibouti	1:51.12	QH3, PB
6	2	4	Mohamed Abouettahery	Morocco	1:51.17	QH3
7	3	1	Anthony Vlatko	Australia	1:51.34	QH3
8	3	6	Athanase Vyizigiro	Burundi	1:52.27	QH3
9	1	3	Sreekiran Nandakumar	India	1:52.42	QH2
10	1	1	Axel Vázquez Morales	Mexico	1:52.44	QH2
11	1	2	Elvin Josué Canales	Honduras	1:52.52	QH2
12	1	6	Eric Guzman	Spain	1:52.82	QH2
13	2	7	Cristian Voicu	Romania	1:53.05	QH2
14	1	4	Jenito Acirio Guezane	Mozambique	1:53.22	QH2, PB
15	2	3	Jakub Davidík	Czech Republic	1:53.75	QH2
16	2	6	Adam Masaczynski	Poland	1:53.82	QH2
17	2	2	Paul Seyringer	Austria	1:54.02	QH2
18	3	2	Pedro Tombolim de Souza	Brazil	1:54.45	QH1
19	1	7	Akoon Akoon Akoon Akoon	South Sudan	1:54.54	QH1
20	2	5	Jovan Rosić	Bosnia and Herzegovina	1:55.14	QH1, PB
21	2	1	João Peixoto	Portugal	1:56.93	QH1
22	3	3	Kimar Farquharson	Jamaica	1:57.51	QH1
23	3	3	Manuel Jacinto Chivela	Angola	1:58.08	QH1
24	3	8	Chester Durand	Dominica	2:06.49	QH1, PB
	2	8	Samer Ali Saleh Aljohar	Jordan	DQ	QH1, R 163.3b

=== Stage 2 ===
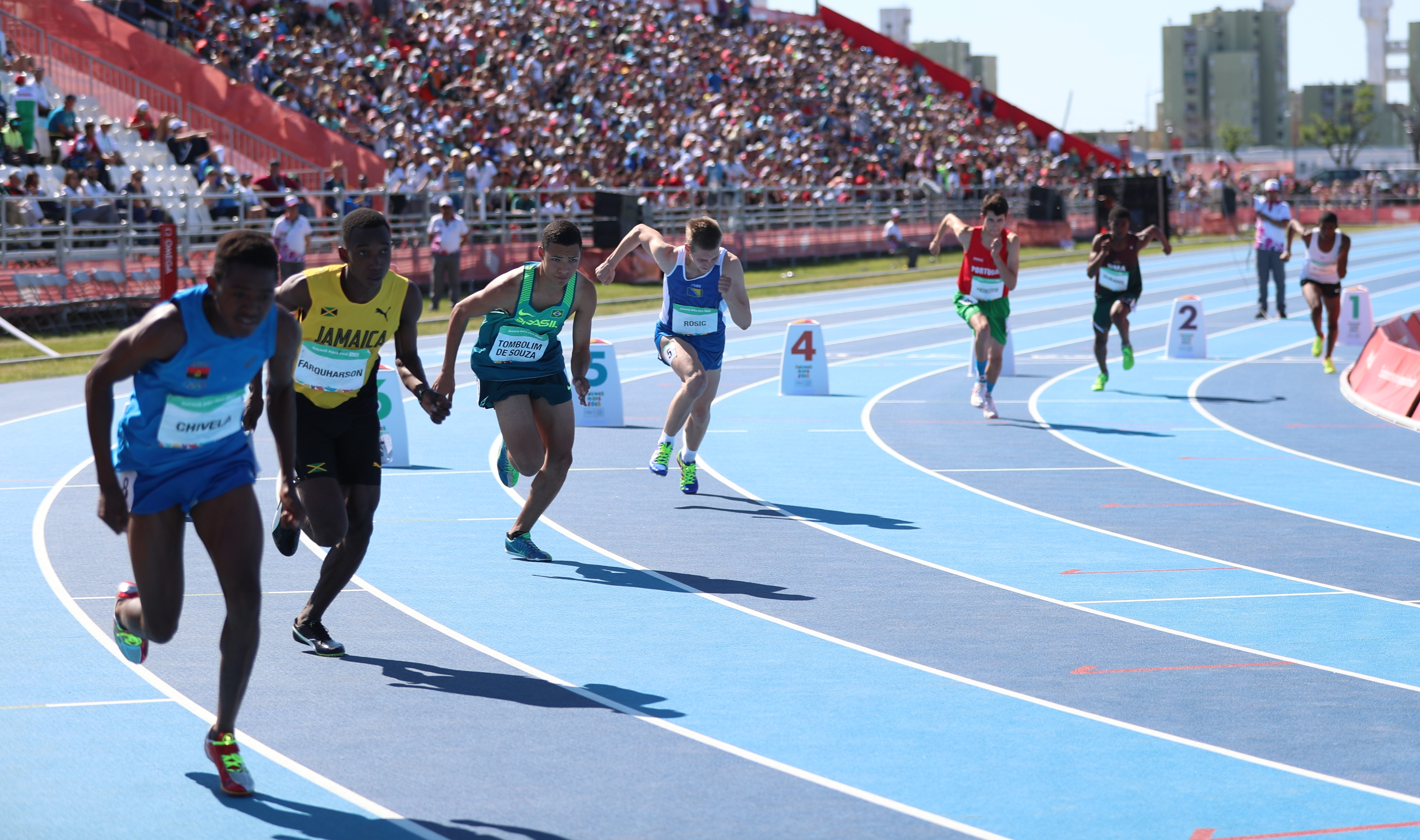
Heat 1

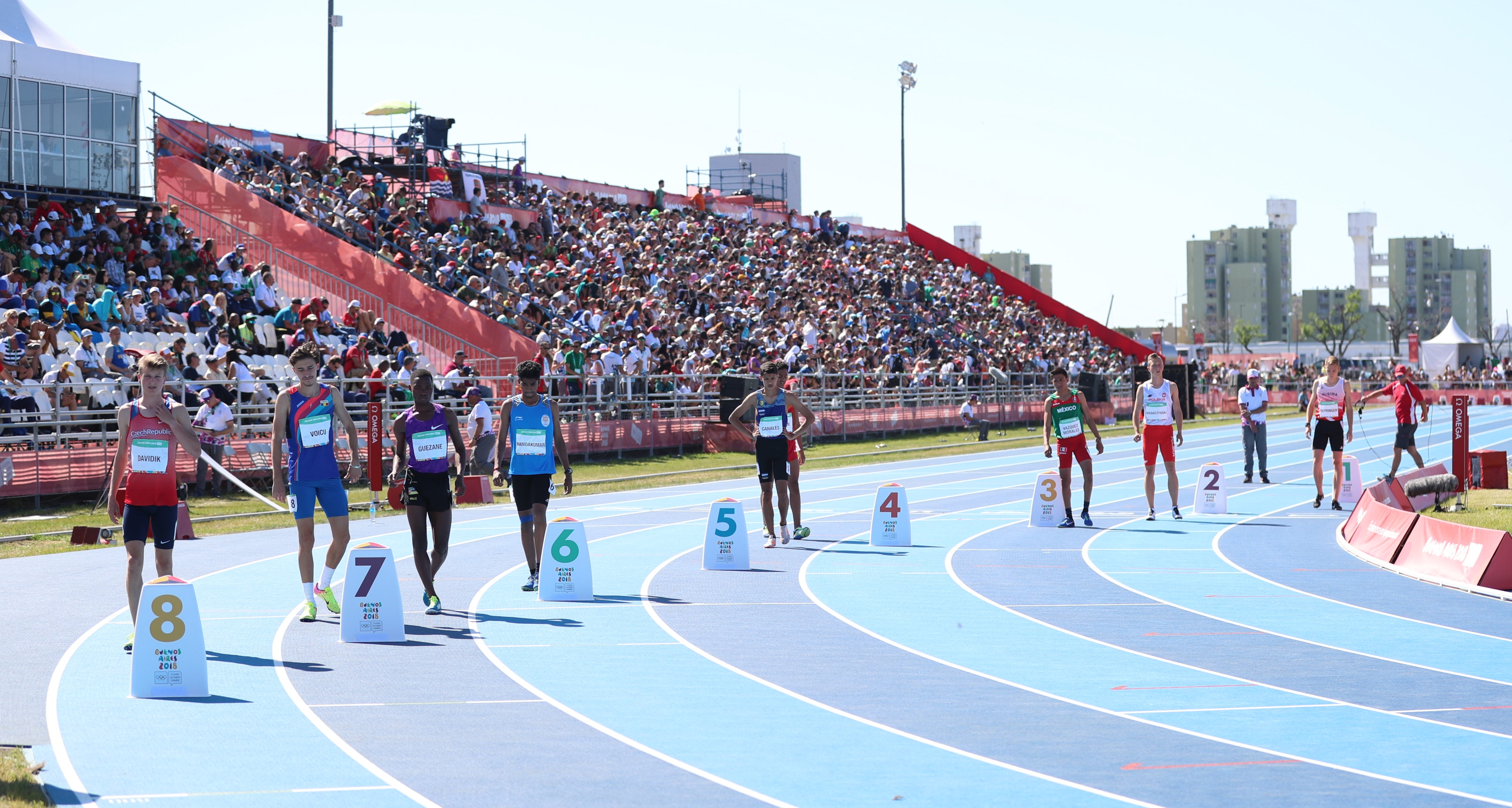
Heat 2

Rank	Heat	Lane	Athlete	Nation	Result	Notes
1	3	6	Tasew Yada	Ethiopia	1:50.38	
2	3	5	Mehmet Çelik	Turkey	1:50.96	
3	3	3	Francis Leshoo Pesi	Kenya	1:51.02	
4	3	7	Mohamed Abouettahery	Morocco	1:51.03	
5	3	8	Hamze Ali Hassan	Djibouti	1:51.55	
6	3	4	Mohamed Ali Gouaned	Algeria	1:51.66	
7	1	7	Kimar Farquharson	Jamaica	1:52.09	
8	3	1	Athanase Vyizigiro	Burundi	1:52.78	
9	1	1	Samer Ali Saleh Aljohar	Jordan	1:53.05	
10	2	4	Eric Guzman	Spain	1:53.46	
11	2	3	Axel Vázquez Morales	Mexico	1:53.84	
12	2	2	Adam Masaczynski	Poland	1:54.17	
13	2	7	Cristian Voicu	Romania	1:54.18	
14	3	2	Anthony Vlatko	Australia	1:54.34	
15	2	7	Jenito Acirio Guezane	Mozambique	1:54.72	
16	2	8	Jakub Davidík	Czech Republic	1:54.75	
17	1	6	Pedro Tombolim de Souza	Brazil	1:55.18	
18	2	5	Elvin Josué Canales	Honduras	1:56.24	
19	1	8	Manuel Jacinto Chivela	Angola	1:58.20	
20	1	3	João Peixoto	Portugal	1:58.46	
21	1	5	Jovan Rosić	Bosnia and Herzegovina	2:01.76	
22	2	1	Paul Seyringer	Austria	2:02.19	
23	1	2	Chester Durand	Dominica	2:03.38	PB
24	2	6	Sreekiran Nandakumar	India	2:06.51	
	1	4	Akoon Akoon Akoon Akoon	South Sudan	DNS	

=== Final placing ===
Rank	Athlete	Nation	Stage 1	Stage 2	Total
1st place, gold medalist(s)	Tasew Yada	Ethiopia	1:49.38	1:50.38	3:39.76
2nd place, silver medalist(s)	Mohamed Ali Gouaned	Algeria	1:50.08	1:51.66	3:41.74
3rd place, bronze medalist(s)	Mehmet Çelik	Turkey	1:50.83	1:50.96	3:41.79
4	Francis Leshoo Pesi	Kenya	1:50.85	1:51.02	3:41.87
5	Mohamed Abouettahery	Morocco	1:51.17	1:51.03	3:42.20
6	Hamze Ali Hassan	Djibouti	1:51.12	1:51.55	3:42.67
7	Athanase Vyizigiro	Burundi	1:52.27	1:52.78	3:45.05
8	Anthony Vlatko	Australia	1:51.34	1:54.34	3:45.68
9	Axel Vázquez Morales	Mexico	1:52.44	1:53.84	3:46.28
10	Eric Guzman	Spain	1:52.82	1:53.46	3:46.28
11	Cristian Voicu	Romania	1:53.05	1:54.18	3:47.23
12	Jenito Acirio Guezane	Mozambique	1:53.22	1:54.72	3:47.94
13	Adam Masaczynski	Poland	1:53.82	1:54.17	3:47.99
14	Jakub Davidík	Czech Republic	1:53.75	1:54.75	3:48.50
15	Elvin Josué Canales	Honduras	1:52.52	1:56.24	3:48.76
16	Kimar Farquharson	Jamaica	1:57.51	1:52.09	3:49.60
17	Pedro Tombolim de Souza	Brazil	1:54.45	1:55.18	3:49.63
18	João Peixoto	Portugal	1:56.93	1:58.46	3:55.39
19	Paul Seyringer	Austria	1:54.02	2:02.19	3:56.21
20	Manuel Jacinto Chivela	Angola	1:58.08	1:58.20	3:56.28
21	Jovan Rosić	Bosnia and Herzegovina	1:55.14	2:01.76	3:56.90
22	Sreekiran Nandakumar	India	1:52.42	2:06.51	3:58.93
23	Chester Durand	Dominica	2:06.49	2:03.38	4:09.87
	Samer Ali Saleh Aljohar	Jordan	DQ	1:53.05	
	Akoon Akoon Akoon Akoon	South Sudan	1:54.54	DNS	
