= Finland at the 2018 Summer Youth Olympics =

- IOC code: FIN
- NOC: Finnish Olympic Committee
- Website: https://www.olympiakomitea.fi/

in Buenos Aires, Argentina 6 – 18 October 2018
- Competitors: 25 in 8 sports
- Medals Ranked 57th: Gold 1 Silver 0 Bronze 1 Total 2

Summer Youth Olympics appearances
- 2010; 2014; 2018

Finland participated at the 2018 Summer Youth Olympics in Buenos Aires, Argentina from 6 October to 18 October 2018.

== Athletics ==
Boys
Track & road events

Athlete	Event	Stage 1		Stage 2		Total	
Athlete	Event	Time	Rank	Time	Rank	Total	Rank
Eemil Helander	2000m steeplechase	5:46.41PB	4	—N/a		13	6
Eemil Helander	Cross country	—N/a		12:15	9(24)	13	6
Julius Mäkinen	Cross country	—N/a		12:48	14(40)	28	13
Julius Mäkinen	3000m	8:41.41	14	—N/a		28	13

Field events

Athlete	Event	Stage 1		Stage 2		Total	
Athlete	Event	Distance	Rank	Distance	Rank	Total	Rank
Arttu Mattila	High jump	2.09	2	2.07	9	4.16	6
Oskari Lahtinen	Hammer throw	73.71PB	5	70.20	7	143.91	6
Topias Laine	Javelin throw	74.57	3	78.85	1	153.42	1st place, gold medalist(s)

Girls
Track & road events

Athlete	Event	Stage 1		Stage 2		Total	
Athlete	Event	Time	Rank	Time	Rank	Total	Rank
Johanna Kylmänen	100 m	12.34	12	11.91	12	24.25	11
Alisa Virtanen	800 m	2:16.82	17	2:17.50	16	4:34.32	14
Nathalie Blomqvist	1500 m	4:29.50	7	—N/a		14	6
Nathalie Blomqvist	Cross country	—N/a		13:38	16	14	6
Pinja Kotinurmi	Cross country	—N/a		14:04	6(27)	16	8
Pinja Kotinurmi	2000m steeplechase	6:50.97	10	—N/a		16	8
Kia Laisi	400m hurdles	1:03.23	14	DNS		DNS	

Field events

Athlete	Event	Stage 1		Stage 2		Total	
Athlete	Event	Distance	Rank	Distance	Rank	Total	Rank
Jessica Kähärä	High jump	1.81	3	1.82	4	3.63	3rd place, bronze medalist(s)
Sara Killinen	Hammer throw	67.63	3	57.96	10	125.59	5
Minna Hollanti	Javelin throw	47.11	10	45.53	11	92.64	11

== Diving ==
Girls

Athlete	Event	Preliminary		Final	
Athlete	Event	Points	Rank	Points	Rank
Ronja Rundgren	Girls' 10m platform	336.85	8 Q	329.80	8

Team

Athlete	Event	Preliminary		Final	
Athlete	Event	Points	Rank	Points	Rank
Team 11; Ronja Rundgren (FIN); Anthony Harding (GBR)	Mixed team	—N/a		299.10	12

== Golf ==
Individual

Athlete	Event	Round 1		Round 2			Round 3			Total		
Athlete	Event	Score	Rank	Score	Total	Rank	Score	Total	Rank	Score	Par	Rank
Elina Saksa	Girls' individual	75 (+5)	11	74 (+4)	149	11	76 (+6)	225	19	225	+15	16
Eemil Alajärvi	Boys' individual	77 (+7)	23	78 (+8)	155	26	81 (+11)	236	26	236	+26	26

Team

Athletes	Event	Round 1 (Fourball)		Round 2 (Foursome)		Round 3 (Individual Stroke)				Total		
Athletes	Event	Score	Rank	Score	Rank	Boy	Girl	Total	Rank	Score	Par	Rank
Elina Saksa; Eemil Alajärvi	Mixed team	65 (−5)	10	73 (+3)	10	76	74	150 (+10)	22	288	+8	17

== Gymnastics ==
=== Artistic ===
Finland qualified one gymnast based on its performance at the 2018 European Junior Championship.

Individual Qualification

Athlete	Event	Apparatus				Total	Rank
Athlete	Event	V	UB	BB	F	Total	Rank
Ada Hautala	Individual	12.791	11.533	12.033 R2	12.000	48.357	11 Q

Individual Finals

Athlete	Event	Apparatus				Total	Rank
Athlete	Event	V	UB	BB	F	Total	Rank
Ada Hautala	All-around	12.916	11.966	12.233	12.033	49.148	9
Ada Hautala	Balance beam	—N/a					

=== Rhythmic ===
Finland qualified one rhythmic gymnast based on its performance at the European qualification event.

- Girls' rhythmic individual all-around – 1 quota

Athlete	Event	Qualification						Final					
Athlete	Event	Hoop	Ball	Clubs	Ribbon	Total	Rank	Hoop	Ball	Clubs	Ribbon	Total	Rank
Aurora Arvelo	All-around	12.950	15.150	14.500	13.200	55.800	12	Did not advance					

=== Multidiscipline ===
Team	Athlete	Acrobatic	Artistic	Rhythmic	Trampoline	Total points	Rank
Team Anna Bessonova (Gray)	Sophia Imrie-Gale (GBR); Clyde Gembickas (GBR)	15	—N/a			381	4
Team Anna Bessonova (Gray)	Ward Claeys (BEL)	—N/a	99	—N/a		381	4
Team Anna Bessonova (Gray)	Reza Bohloulzade Hajlari (IRI)	—N/a	65	—N/a		381	4
Team Anna Bessonova (Gray)	Ayan Moldagaliyev (KAZ)	—N/a	36	—N/a		381	4
Team Anna Bessonova (Gray)	Eglė Stalinkevičiūtė (LTU)	—N/a	42	—N/a		381	4
Team Anna Bessonova (Gray)	Ada Hautala (FIN)	—N/a	10	—N/a		381	4
Team Anna Bessonova (Gray)	Giorgia Villa (ITA)	—N/a	11	—N/a		381	4
Team Anna Bessonova (Gray)	Celia Joseph Noël (FRA)	—N/a		40	—N/a	381	4
Team Anna Bessonova (Gray)	Celeste D'arcangelo (ARG)	—N/a		13	—N/a	381	4
Team Anna Bessonova (Gray)	Tatyana Volozhanina (BUL)	—N/a		26	—N/a	381	4
Team Anna Bessonova (Gray)	Jérémy Chartier (CAN)	—N/a			15	381	4
Team Anna Bessonova (Gray)	Vera Beliankina (RUS)	—N/a			9	381	4
Team Dong Dong (Gray)	Rachel Nell (RSA); Sidwell Madibeng (RSA)	33	—N/a			389	5
Team Dong Dong (Gray)	Daniel Schwed (GER)	—N/a	63	—N/a		389	5
Team Dong Dong (Gray)	Marcus Stenberg (SWE)	—N/a	27	—N/a		389	5
Team Dong Dong (Gray)	Diogo Soares (BRA)	—N/a	34	—N/a		389	5
Team Dong Dong (Gray)	Beatriz Cardoso (POR)	—N/a	33	—N/a		389	5
Team Dong Dong (Gray)	Ana-Maria Puiu (ROU)	—N/a	42	—N/a		389	5
Team Dong Dong (Gray)	Lee Yunseo (KOR)	—N/a	46	—N/a		389	5
Team Dong Dong (Gray)	Aurora Arvelo (FIN)	—N/a		38	—N/a	389	5
Team Dong Dong (Gray)	Khrystyna Pohranychna (UKR)	—N/a		22	—N/a	389	5
Team Dong Dong (Gray)	Wang Zilu (CHN)	—N/a		12	—N/a	389	5
Team Dong Dong (Gray)	Nikita Babyonishev (UZB)	—N/a			16	389	5
Team Dong Dong (Gray)	Yekaterina Lukina (KAZ)	—N/a			23	389	5

== Judo ==
Individual

Athlete	Event	Round of 16	Quarterfinals	Semifinals	Rep 1	Rep 2	Rep 3	Final / BM	
Athlete	Event	Opposition Result	Opposition Result	Opposition Result	Opposition Result	Opposition Result	Opposition Result	Opposition Result	Rank
Turpal Djoukaev	Boys' −66 kg	Almishri (LBA); W 10–00	Naguchev (RUS); L 00s3–10	Did not advance	Jashari (MKD); W 1–00s1	Nazarov (UZB); L 00s3–10s1	Did not advance		7

Team

Athletes	Event	Round of 16	Quarterfinals	Semifinals	Final	
Athletes	Event	Opposition Result	Opposition Result	Opposition Result	Opposition Result	Rank
Team Los Angeles; Soniya Bhatta (NEP); Ariel Shulman (ISR); Nahomys Acosta Batte (CUB); Turpal Djoukaev (FIN); Saskia Brothers (AUS); Georgios Balarjishvili (CYP); Raffaela Igl (GER); Alin Bagrin (MDA)	Mixed team	Team Seoul (MIX); W 5–3	Team Athens (MIX); L 3–5	Did not advance		5

== Shooting ==
Finland qualified one sport shooter based on its performance at the 2017 European Championships.

Individual

Athlete	Event	Qualification		Final	
Athlete	Event	Points	Rank	Points	Rank
Viivi Natalia Kemppi	Girls' 10m air rifle	621.0	9	Did not advance	

Team

Athletes	Event	Qualification		Round of 16	Quarterfinals	Semifinals	Final / BM	Rank
Athletes	Event	Points	Rank	Opposition Result	Opposition Result	Opposition Result	Opposition Result	Rank
Viivi Natalia Kemppi (FIN); Facundo Firmapaz (ARG)	Mixed team 10m air rifle	825.9	4Q	Wang (CHN); Emilov (BUL); W 10–9	Benetti (ITA); Mahardika (INA); W 10–5	Erdenechuluun (MGL); Pekler (HUN); L 5–10	Martínez López (MEX); Wadlegger (AUT); W 10–7	3rd place, bronze medalist(s)

== Swimming ==
Boys

Athlete	Event	Heat		Semifinal		Final	
Athlete	Event	Time	Rank	Time	Rank	Time	Rank
Alexey Belfer	50 m freestyle	23.67	21	Did not advance			
Roni Kallström	50 m backstroke	26.32	8Q	26.79	15	Did not advance	
Roni Kallström	100 m backstroke	57.65	19	Did not advance			
Roni Kallström	200 m backstroke	2:07.80	21	Did not advance			

Girls

Athlete	Event	Heat		Semifinal		Final	
Athlete	Event	Time	Rank	Time	Rank	Time	Rank
Nea-Amanda Heinola	50 m freestyle	26.08	12Q	26.49	14	Did not advance	
Nea-Amanda Heinola	100 m freestyle	57.22	21	Did not advance			
Nea-Amanda Heinola	200 m freestyle	2:06.78	27	—N/a		Did not advance	
Nea-Amanda Heinola	50 m backstroke	30.27	25	—N/a		Did not advance	
Nea-Amanda Heinola	50 m butterfly	28.04	22	—N/a		Did not advance	
Nea-Amanda Heinola	200 m individual medley	2:19.01	15	—N/a		Did not advance	
Laura Lahtinen	50 m breaststroke	32.01	8Q	32.49	11	Did not advance	
Laura Lahtinen	100 m breaststroke	1:12.73	34	Did not advance			
Laura Lahtinen	200 m breaststroke	DSQ		Did not advance			
Laura Lahtinen	100 m butterfly	1:02.15	15Q	1:02.00	15	Did not advance	
Laura Lahtinen	200 m butterfly	2:14.17	4Q	—N/a		2:13.51	5

Mixed

Athlete	Event	Heats		Final	
Athlete	Event	Time	Rank	Time	Rank
Alexey Belfer; Nea-Amanda Heinola; Roni Kallström; Laura Lahtinen	4×100 m medley relay	4:07.84	22	Did not advance	

== Table tennis ==
Singles

Athlete	Event	Group stage	Rank	Round of 16	Quarterfinals	Semifinals	Final / BM	Rank
Athlete	Event	Opposition Score	Rank	Opposition Score	Opposition Score	Opposition Score	Opposition Score	Rank
Annika Lundström	Girls' singles	Group H Sawettabut (THA); L 1–4 (11:9, 5:11, 9:11, 5:11, 7:11)	4	Did not advance				25
Annika Lundström	Girls' singles	Tailakova (RUS); L 0–4 (10:12, 4:11, 5:11, 4:11)	4	Did not advance				25
Annika Lundström	Girls' singles	Lee (HKG); L 1–4 (2:11, 11:6, 10:12, 8:11, 6:11)	4	Did not advance				25

Team

Athletes	Event	Group stage	Rank	Round of 16	Quarterfinals	Semifinals	Final / BM	Rank
Athletes	Event	Opposition Score	Rank	Opposition Score	Opposition Score	Opposition Score	Opposition Score	Rank
Intercontinental 2 Annika Lundström (FIN); Jann Mari Nayre (PHI)	Mixed international team	Group B Europe 3 Bogdanova (BLR); Sgouropoulos (GRE); L 0–3	3	Did not advance				17
Intercontinental 2 Annika Lundström (FIN); Jann Mari Nayre (PHI)	Mixed international team	Intercontinental 1 Lee (HKG); Hamdoun (TUN); W 2–1	3	Did not advance				17
Intercontinental 2 Annika Lundström (FIN); Jann Mari Nayre (PHI)	Mixed international team	Chinese Taipei; Su (TPE); Lin (TPE); L 0–1	3	Did not advance				17
