= Baptiste Guyon =

French long-distance runner (born 2001)

Personal information
- Born: 17 January 2001 (age 25) Romorantin-Lanthenay, France
- Height: 183 cm (6 ft 0 in)
- Weight: 65 kg (143 lb)

Sport
- Country: France
- Sport: Athletics
- Events: Long-distance running, Steeplechase
Medal record
Men's athletics
Representing France
European 10,000m Cup
Gold medal – first place	2026 La Spezia	Team race
European Athletics U23 Championships
Bronze medal – third place	2023 Espoo	3000 m s'chase
European U18 Championships
Gold medal – first place	2018 Győr	2000 m s'chase
Youth Olympic Games
Silver medal – second place	2018 Buenos Aires	2000 m s'chase

Baptiste Guyon (born 17 January 2001) is a French long distance, cross country and steeplechase runner. He was French champion in the 5000 metres in 2026.

== Biography ==
A member of AC Romorantin in Centre-Val de Loire, and coached by Richard Ferrand, he won the gold medal in the 2000 metres steeplechase at the 2018 European Athletics U18 Championships in Győr, Hungary, breaking the French age-group record with a time of 5:43.92 in July 2018 to win. In October 2018, he won a silver medal at the 2018 Summer Youth Olympics in Buenos Aires, Argentina, in the combined 2,000m steeplechase and cross country event. In March 2019 in Aarhus, Denmark, he finished as the top Frenchman and second European in the under-20 race at the 2019 IAAF World Cross Country Championships, placing 40th overall. He placed tenth in the 3000 metres steeplechase at the 2019 European Athletics U20 Championships in Sweden.

In July 2023, he won the bronze medal in the 3000 metres steeplechase at the 2023 European Athletics U23 Championships in Espoo, Finland, running 8:33.64. In August, he placed sixth in the 3000 m steeplechase at the delayed 2021 Summer World University Games in Chengdu, China.

In May 2026, he placed fifth in the individual race and won team gold for France alongside Simon Bedard and Valentin Gondouin at the 2026 European 10,000m Cup in La Spezia, Italy. In July 2026, he won over 5000 metres at the French Athletics Championships in Albi. In August, he placed fifth overall in the 10,000 metres competing for France at the 2026 European Athletics Championships in Birmingham, England.
