= Timor-Leste at the 2018 Summer Youth Olympics =

- IOC code: TLS
- NOC: National Olympic Committee of East Timor

in Buenos Aires, Argentina 6 – 18 October 2018
- Competitors: 2 in 1 sports
- Medals: Gold 0 Silver 0 Bronze 0 Total 0

Summer Youth Olympics appearances
- 2010; 2014; 2018

East Timor participated at the 2018 Summer Youth Olympics in Buenos Aires, Argentina from 6 October to 18 October 2018.

== Athletics ==
East Timor qualified 2 athletes.

Boys

Athlete	Event	Stage 1		Stage 2		Total	
Athlete	Event	Distance	Rank	Distance	Rank	Distance	Rank
Manuel Belo	1500 m	4:13.41	20	DNS		N/A	

Girls

Athlete	Event	Stage 1		Stage 2		Total	
Athlete	Event	Distance	Rank	Distance	Rank	Distance	Rank
Ángela Freitas	3000 m	10:00.36	13	DNS		N/A	
