= Parami Wasanthi Maristela =

Sri Lankan track and field athlete

Personal information
- Native name: Parami Wasanthi Maristela Fernando
- Nationality: Sri Lankan
- Citizenship: Sri Lankan
- Born: 28 May 2001 (age 25) Sri Lanka

Sport
- Country: Sri Lanka
- Sport: Track and field
- Event: Distance Runner
- International level: 2019

Achievements and titles
- Personal best: 6:33.06 at 2018 Summer Youth Olympics
Medal record
Women's athletics
Representing Sri Lanka
Summer Youth Olympics
Bronze medal – third place	2018 Buenos Aires	2000m steeplechase
Asian Junior Athletics Championships
Gold medal – first place	2018 Gifu	3000m steeplechase
Event	1st	2nd	3rd
Youth Olympic Games	0	0	1
Asian Junior Championships	1	0	0
Total	1	0	1

Parami Wasanthi Maristela Kalumarakkalage also known as Parami Wasanthi Maristela (born 28 May 2001) is a Sri Lankan track and field athlete who competes in the 2000 metre steeplechase event. She is the first Sri Lankan to have won a Youth Olympic medal. She pursued her secondary education at Kuliyapitiya Central School.

== Career ==
She made her Youth Olympics debut representing Sri Lanka at the 2018 Summer Youth Olympics which was held in Buenos Aires and competed in the women's 2000m steeplechase event. She claimed a bronze medal in the event with a timing of 6 minutes 33.06 seconds. She also became the first ever Sri Lankan to win a medal at the Youth Olympics. It was also Sri Lanka's first major medal in a global athletic event after 11 years since Susanthika Jayasinghe's bronze medal achievement at the 2007 World Championships in Athletics . She was placed at 21st position in the women's 3000m steeplechase event at the 2018 IAAF World U20 Championships.

She also won a gold medal in the women's steeplechase at the 2018 Asian Junior Athletics Championships held in Gifu Japan with a new junior record in steeplechase event. In 2018, it was revealed that she would receive a scholarship to Kenya through the support of Athletics Association of Sri Lanka in order to make arrangements for her to become an expertise in women's steeplechase competitions. However, the move did not materialise for unknown reasons. She also played rugby and she represented the Sri Lanka women's U16 rugby team.

She won the Award for Emerging Sportswoman of the Year for 2018 during the Newsfirst Platinum Awards.

== Personal life ==
She hails from a difficult family background and underprivileged family circumstances. Her father Anthony Tudor is a fisherman and it was her father who encouraged Parami to take up the sport of athletics.

In 2021, she appealed and demanded to the Sri Lankan authorities to convince the Government of India to immediately release her father and other fishermen who were arrested by the coastal guards for illegally straying in the Andaman Islands. Her father was arrested by the Indian authorities alongside fellow fishermen in January 2021 and they were released in August 2021.

== Controversy ==
Sri Lankan sprint queen and 2000 Summer Olympic medalist Susanthika Jayasinghe landed a scathing attack on Parami Wasanthi criticising Parami's accusations regarding the failure of Sri Lanka Olympic Committee's promise to support athletes with required financial assistance.
