= Sri Lanka at the 2018 Summer Youth Olympics =

- IOC code: SRI
- NOC: National Olympic Committee of Sri Lanka
- Website: https://www.olympic.lk/

in Buenos Aires, Argentina 6 – 18 October 2018
- Competitors: 13 in 7 sports
- Medals Ranked 83rd: Gold 0 Silver 0 Bronze 1 Total 1

Summer Youth Olympics appearances
- 2010; 2014; 2018

Sri Lanka participated at the 2018 Summer Youth Olympics in Buenos Aires, Argentina from 6 to 18 October 2018.

Sri Lanka made its Youth Olympics (and Olympics) debut in three sports it qualified in: archery, basketball, and gymnastics. Sri Lanka also made its Youth Olympics debut in the sport of shooting.

Parami Wasanthi Maristela won Sri Lanka's first ever Youth Olympics medal, a bronze in the girls' 2000 metre steeplechase.

== Competitors ==
The following is the list of number of competitors participating at the Games per sport/discipline.

Sport	Men	Women	Total
Archery	1	0	1
Athletics	2	2	4
Badminton	0	1	1
Basketball	0	4	4
Gymnastics	0	1	1
Shooting	1	0	1
Swimming	1	0	1
Total	5	8	13

== Medalists ==
Medals awarded to participants of mixed-NOC (combined) teams are represented in italics. These medals are not counted towards the individual NOC medal tally.

Medal	Name	Sport	Event	Date
Gold	Hasini Nusaka Ambalangodage	Badminton	Mixed teams	12 October
Bronze	Parami Wasanthi Maristela	Athletics	Girls' 2000 metre steeplechase	15 October

Medals by sport
Sport	1st place, gold medalist(s)	2nd place, silver medalist(s)	3rd place, bronze medalist(s)	Total
Athletics	0	0	1	1
Total	0	0	1	1

Medals by day
Day	1st place, gold medalist(s)	2nd place, silver medalist(s)	3rd place, bronze medalist(s)	Total
15 October	0	0	1	1
Total	0	0	1	1

== Archery ==
Sri Lanka qualified one archer based on its performance at the 2017 World Archery Youth Championships.

Individual

Athlete	Event	Ranking round		Round of 32	Round of 16	Quarterfinals	Semifinals	Final / BM	Rank
Athlete	Event	Score	Seed	Opposition Score	Opposition Score	Opposition Score	Opposition Score	Opposition Score	Rank
Ravien Dalpatadu	Boys' singles	667	14 Q	Hazael Jesus Rodríguez Valero (CUB); W 6–5	Feng Hao (CHN); W 6–5	Artem Ovchynnikov (UKR); L 2–6	did not advance		=5

Team

Athletes	Event	Ranking round		Round of 32	Round of 16	Quarterfinals	Semifinals	Final / BM	Rank
Athletes	Event	Score	Seed	Opposition Score	Opposition Score	Opposition Score	Opposition Score	Opposition Score	Rank
Ravien Dalpatadu (SRI); Isabella Bassi (CHI)	Mixed team	1298	20 Q	Hendrik Õun (EST); Nicole Marie Tagle (PHI); L 4–5	did not advance				=17

== Athletics ==
Sri Lanka qualified two athletes. On the first day of the Asian trials held in Bangkok, Thailand, Sri Lanka won two quotas. Dilan Bogoda took first place in the boys' 400 metres event, while Parami Wasanthi Maristela won the 2000 metres steeplechase in a world leading team to qualify. On the second day of the trials, high jumper Seniru Amarasinghe qualified in second place with the third ranked jump in the world (in the age category), while sprinter Shelinda Jansen qualified in third position.

Track & road events

Athlete	Event	Stage 1		Stage 2		Total	
Athlete	Event	Result	Rank	Result	Rank	Total	Rank
Dilan Bogoda	Boys' 400 m	48.52 PB	5	48.81	7	1:37.33	7
Shalinda Jansen	Girls' 200 m	25.00	11	24.07 PB	9	49.07	9
Parami Wasanthi Maristela	Girls' 2000 metre steeplechase	6:33.06 PB	3	13:47	17 (4)	7	3rd place, bronze medalist(s)

- Total refers to the placement of round 1 added to the placement in round 2 in the women's 2000 m steeplechase event. The second round will be held as part of the cross-country race.

Field event

Athlete	Event	Stage 1		Stage 2		Total	
Athlete	Event	Distance	Position	Distance	Position	Total	Rank
Seniru Amarasinghe	Boys' high jump	2.05	=4	2.14	4	4.19	4

== Badminton ==
Sri Lanka qualified a girls' quota after it was reallocated to the country from an unused Tripartite Commission universality spot.

Girl

Athlete	Event	Group stage				Quarterfinal	Semifinal	Final / BM	Rank
Athlete	Event	Opposition Score	Opposition Score	Opposition Score	Rank	Opposition Score	Opposition Score	Opposition Score	Rank
Hasini Nusaka Ambalangodage	Singles	Jiménez (DOM); W 2–0 (21–14, 21–16)	Chaiwan (THA); L 0–2 (5–21, 12–21)	Ilori (NGR); W 2–0 (21–8, 21–9)	2	did not advance			9

Team

Athlete	Event	Group stage				Quarterfinal	Semifinal	Final / BM	Rank
Athlete	Event	Opposition Score	Opposition Score	Opposition Score	Rank	Opposition Score	Opposition Score	Opposition Score	Rank
Team Alpha; Hasini Nusaka Ambalangodage (SRI); Lakshya Sen (IND); Giovanni Toti (ITA); Vannthoun Vath (CAM); Brian Yang (CAN); Maria Delcheva (BUL); Jennie Gai (USA); Ashwathi Pillai (SWE)	Mixed Teams	Epsilon (MIX); W 110–98	Delta (MIX); L 99–110	Zeta (MIX); W 110–103	2 Q	Gamma (MIX); W 110–94	Theta (MIX); W 110–90	Omega (MIX); W 110–106	1st place, gold medalist(s)

== Basketball ==
Sri Lanka qualified a girls' basketball team of four athletes. This marked the country's debut in the sport at the Youth Olympics.

=== Girls' tournament ===
Athletes	Event	Group stage					Quarterfinal	Semifinal	Final / BM	Rank
Athletes	Event	Opposition Score	Opposition Score	Opposition Score	Opposition Score	Rank	Opposition Score	Opposition Score	Opposition Score	Rank
Leia Hamza; Fathima Morseth; Rashmi Perera; Nihari Perera	Girls' tournament	Egypt; W 17–15	United States; L 8–21	Ukraine; L 6–18	Venezuela; L 10–21	4	did not advance			

Skills Competition

Athlete	Event	Qualification			Final		
Athlete	Event	Points	Time	Rank	Points	Time	Rank
Leia Hamza	Shoot-out Contest	3	28.3	22	did not advance		
Rashmi Perera	Shoot-out Contest	1	29.5	34	did not advance		

== Gymnastics ==
=== Artistic ===
Sri Lanka qualified one gymnast based on its performance at the 2018 Asian Junior Championship.

Girls
Individual Qualification

Athlete	Event	Apparatus				Total	Rank
Athlete	Event	V	UB	BB	F	Total	Rank
Milka Gehani	Individual	12.833	8.966	11.333	11.266	44.298	28

=== Multidiscipline ===
Team	Athlete	Acrobatic	Artistic	Rhythmic	Trampoline	Total points	Rank
Team Nadia Comăneci (Yellow)	Anastassiya Arkhipova (KAZ); Dmitriy Nemerenko (KAZ)	15	—N/a			410	9
Team Nadia Comăneci (Yellow)	Uri Zeidel (ISR)	—N/a	105	—N/a		410	9
Team Nadia Comăneci (Yellow)	Sergey Naidin	—N/a	31	—N/a		410	9
Team Nadia Comăneci (Yellow)	Mathys Cordule (FRA)	—N/a	21	—N/a		410	9
Team Nadia Comăneci (Yellow)	Zarith Imaan Khalid (MAS)	—N/a	41	—N/a		410	9
Team Nadia Comăneci (Yellow)	Lisa Zimmermann (GER)	—N/a	36	—N/a		410	9
Team Nadia Comăneci (Yellow)	Milka Dona (SRI)	—N/a	33	—N/a		410	9
Team Nadia Comăneci (Yellow)	Natalie Garcia (CAN)	—N/a		19	—N/a	410	9
Team Nadia Comăneci (Yellow)	Ioanna Magopoulou (GRE)	—N/a		28	—N/a	410	9
Team Nadia Comăneci (Yellow)	Ketevan Arbolishvili (GEO)	—N/a		42	—N/a	410	9
Team Nadia Comăneci (Yellow)	Takumi Fujimoto (JPN)	—N/a			20	410	9
Team Nadia Comăneci (Yellow)	Michelle Mares (MEX)	—N/a			19	410	9

== Shooting ==
Sri Lanka received a reallocated spot in the boys' 10 m air rifle event.

Boys
Individual

Athlete	Event	Qualification		Final	
Athlete	Event	Points	Rank	Points	Rank
Chanidu Seanayake Mudiyanselage	10m air rifle	610.6	17	did not advance	

Team

Athletes	Event	Qualification		Round of 16	Quarterfinals	Semifinals	Final / BM	Rank
Athletes	Event	Points	Rank	Opposition Result	Opposition Result	Opposition Result	Opposition Result	Rank
Chanidu Seanayake Mudiyanselage (SRI); Anna Janssen (GER)	Mixed 10 m air rifle	819.0	14 Q	Hayk Babayan (ARM); Victoria Rossiter (AUS); L 9–10	did not advance			

== Swimming ==
Sri Lanka qualified one male swimmer. Akalanka Peiris met the A or B standard times for all of his events.

Boy

Athlete	Event	Heat		Semifinal		Final	
Athlete	Event	Time	Rank	Time	Rank	Time	Rank
Akalanka Peiris	50 m backstroke	26.33 NR	9 Q	26.36	10	did not advance	
Akalanka Peiris	100 m backstroke	57.34	16 Q	57.35	16	did not advance	
Akalanka Peiris	50 m butterfly	25.18	25	did not advance			

== See also ==
- Sri Lanka at the 2018 Commonwealth Games
- Sri Lanka at the 2018 Asian Games
