= Bosnia and Herzegovina at the 2018 Summer Youth Olympics =

- IOC code: BIH
- NOC: Olympic Committee of Bosnia and Herzegovina
- Website: http://www.okbih.ba/

in Buenos Aires, Argentina 6 – 18 October 2018
- Competitors: 6
- Flag bearer: Emina Pašukan
- Medals: Gold 0 Silver 0 Bronze 0 Total 0

Summer Youth Olympics appearances (overview)
- 2010; 2014; 2018

Bosnia and Herzegovina participated at the 2018 Summer Youth Olympics in Buenos Aires, Argentina from 6 October to 18 October 2018.

== Athletics ==
Boys
Track & road events

Athlete	Event	Stage 1		Stage 2		Total	
Athlete	Event	Result	Rank	Result	Rank	Result	Rank
Jovan Rosić	800 m	1:55.14	20	2:01.76	21	3:56.90	21

Girls
Track & road events

Athlete	Event	Stage 1		Stage 2		Total	
Athlete	Event	Result	Rank	Result	Rank	Result	Rank
Aleksandra Roljić	800 m	2:16.43	16	2:20.01	21	4:36.44	19

== Shooting ==
Bosnia and Herzegovina was given a quota by the tripartite committee to compete in shooting.

- Boys' 10m Air Rifle - 1 quota

Individual

Athlete	Event	Qualification		Final	
Athlete	Event	Points	Rank	Points	Rank
Amar Dizdarević	Boys' 10m Air Rifle	608.6	18	Did not advance	

Team

Athletes	Event	Qualification		Round of 16	Quarterfinals	Semifinals	Final / BM	Rank
Athletes	Event	Points	Rank	Opposition Result	Opposition Result	Opposition Result	Opposition Result	Rank
Marija Malić (SRB); Amar Dizdarević (BIH)	Mixed Team 10m Air Rifle	821.1	11Q	Anastasiia Dereviagina (RUS); Ismael Edson Ramos Ramirez (MEX); L 4–10	Did not advance			13

== Swimming ==
Boys

Athletes	Event	Heat		Semifinal		Final	
Athletes	Event	Time	Position	Time	Position	Time	Position
Fatih Tahirović	50 m butterfly	25.36	32	Did not advance			

Girls

Athletes	Event	Heat		Semifinal		Final	
Athletes	Event	Time	Position	Time	Position	Time	Position
Emina Pašukan	50 m breaststroke	33.84	28	Did not advance			
Emina Pašukan	100 m breaststroke	1:12.73	34	Did not advance			
Emina Pašukan	200 m breaststroke	2:36.43	23	Did not advance			
Tina Tadić	200 m breaststroke	2:48.65	35	Did not advance			
