= Anass Essayi =

Moroccan Olympic 1500 meters runner

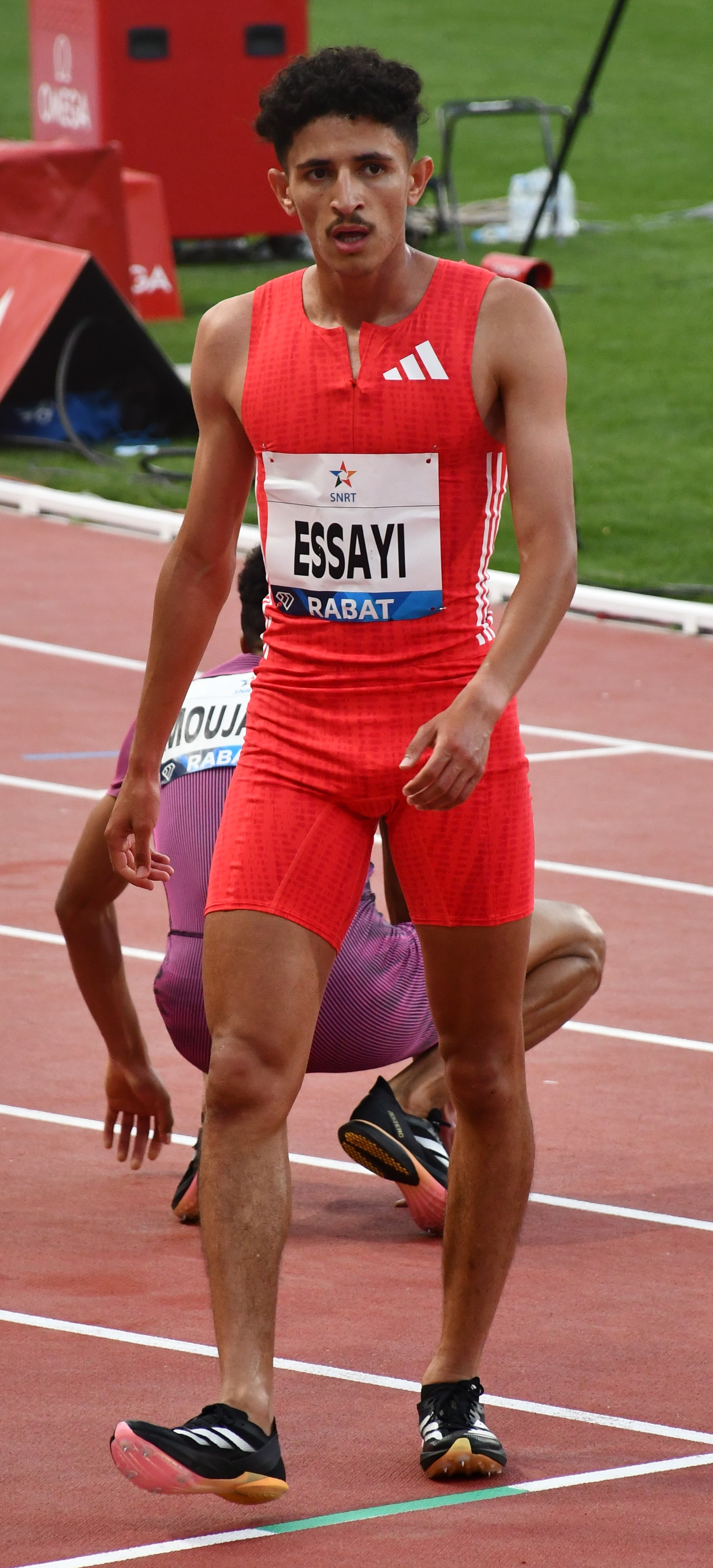

Personal information
- Born: 18 May 2001 (age 25)
- Height: 5 ft 8 in (173 cm)

Sport
- Country: Morocco
- Events: 1500 metres, Mile
- College team: South Carolina Gamecocks
- Coached by: Andrew Allden '22 - Present

Achievements and titles
- Personal bests: 800 metres: 1:47.70 (Columbia, SC, 2022); 1500 metres: 3:30.67 (Zurich, 2025); Mile: 3:50.46 (Boston, 2023); 3000 metres: 7:41.93i (New York 2023)
Medal record
Men's athletics
Representing Morocco
Islamic Solidarity Games
| Gold medal – first place | 2025 Riyadh | 1500 m |
Mediterranean Games
| Bronze medal – third place | 2026 Taranto | 1500 m |
African Youth Games
| Silver medal – second place | 2018 Algiers | 1500 meters |
Youth Olympic Games
| Silver medal – second place | 2018 Buenos Aires | 1500 meters |

Anass Essayi (Arabic: أنس الساعي; born 18 May 2001) is a Moroccan athlete who specializes in the 1,500 meters event.

Essayi won the silver medal in the 1,500 meters at the 2018 All-Africa Youth Games in Algiers as well as the 2018 Youth Olympic Games in Buenos Aires. He later won the bronze medal in the 1,500 meters at the 2021 Pan Arab Athletics Championships in Rades.

Essayi represented Morocco at the 2020 Tokyo Olympics, where he competed in the men's 1,500 m.

He was studying business administration at Al Akhawayn University in August 2021 and in 2022 is a student at University of South Carolina.

== NCAA ==
Essayi won the 2022 Southeastern Conference Indoor Track and Field Championship men's mile in a personal best time 3:57.37 at Texas A&M Gilliam Indoor Track Stadium.
