= Kenya at the 2018 Summer Youth Olympics =

- IOC code: KEN
- NOC: National Olympic Committee of Kenya

in Buenos Aires, Argentina 6 – 18 October 2018
- Competitors: 19 in 2 sports
- Medals Ranked 27th: Gold 3 Silver 1 Bronze 0 Total 4

Summer Youth Olympics appearances
- 2010; 2014; 2018

Kenya participated at the 2018 Summer Youth Olympics in Buenos Aires, Argentina from 6 October to 18 October 2018.

Kenya also had a competitor in swimming (girls' 100m freestyle), but she did not compete.

== Medalists ==
Medal	Name	Sport	Event	Date
Gold	Jackson Kavesa Muema	Athletics	Men's 3000m/Cross Country	15 October
Gold	Edinah Jebitok	Athletics	Women's 1500m/Cross Country	15 October
Gold	Fancy Cherono	Athletics	Women's 2000m Steeplechase/Cross Country	15 October
Silver	Mercy Chepkorir Kerarei	Athletics	Women's 3000m/Cross Country	15 October

== Athletics ==
Athlete	Event	Stage 1	Stage 2	Final Placing
Frances Leshoo Pesi	Men's 800m	1:50.85	1:51.02	4
Nickson Lesiyia Pariken	Men's 1500m/Cross Country	3:59.11	11:48	6
Jackson Kavesa Muema	Men's 3000m/Cross Country	8:09.95	11:12	1st place, gold medalist(s)
Denis Mutuku Matheka	Men's 2000m Steeplechase/Cross Country	5:50.54	11:55	4
Angela Ndungwa Munguti	Women's 800m	2:07.34	2:11.06	5
Edinah Jebitok	Women's 1500m/Cross Country	4:16.68	12:37	1st place, gold medalist(s)
Mercy Chepkorir Kerarei	Women's 3000m/Cross Country	9:13.59	12:56	2nd place, silver medalist(s)
Fancy Cherono	Women's 2000m Steeplechase/Cross Country	6:26.08	12:51	1st place, gold medalist(s)
Ita Leashan	Men's Javelin Throw 700g	72.73	74.52	4
Martha Nthanze Musai	Women's Javelin Throw 500g	46.89	46.52	10

== Field hockey ==
- Boys' tournament
