= Kuwait at the 2018 Summer Youth Olympics =

- IOC code: KUW
- NOC: Kuwait Olympic Committee
- Website: www.kuwaitolympic.net (in Arabic and English)

in Buenos Aires, Argentina 6 – 18 October 2018
- Competitors: 2 in 2 sports
- Medals: Gold 0 Silver 0 Bronze 0 Total 0

Summer Youth Olympics appearances
- 2010; 2014; 2018; 2026

Kuwait participated at the 2018 Summer Youth Olympics in Buenos Aires, Argentina from 6 October to 18 October 2018.

== Athletics ==
Boys
Field events

Athlete	Event	Stage 1		Stage 2		Total	
Athlete	Event	Result	Rank	Result	Rank	Total	Rank
Abdulaziz Al-Hemdan	Javelin throw	NM		DNS			

== Swimming ==
Boys

Athlete	Event	Heat		Semifinal		Final	
Athlete	Event	Time	Rank	Time	Rank	Time	Rank
Sauod Al-Shamroukh	50 metre freestyle	27.57	45	did not advance			
