= Australia at the 2018 Summer Youth Olympics =

- IOC code: AUS
- NOC: Australian Olympic Committee
- Website: https://www.olympics.com.au/

in Buenos Aires, Argentina 6 – 18 October 2018
- Competitors: 90 in 27 sports
- Medals Ranked 11th: Gold 4 Silver 8 Bronze 4 Total 16

Summer Youth Olympics appearances
- 2010; 2014; 2018; 2026

Australia participated at the 2018 Summer Youth Olympics in Buenos Aires, Argentina from 6 October to 18 October 2018.

== Archery ==
Individual

| Athlete | Event | Ranking round | | Round of 32 | Round of 16 | Quarterfinals | Semifinals | Final / BM | |
| Athlete | Event | Score | Seed | Opposition Score | Opposition Score | Opposition Score | Opposition Score | Opposition Score | Rank |
|---|---|---|---|---|---|---|---|---|---|
| Jason Hurnall | Boys' individual | 663 | 17 | Benitez (PAR); L 4–6 | did not advance | | | | 17 |
| Laura Paeglis | Girls' individual | 629 | 22 | Canales (ESP); L 2–6 | did not advance | | | | 17 |

Team

| Athletes | Event | Ranking round | | Round of 32 | Round of 16 | Quarterfinals | Semifinals | Final / BM | Rank |
| Athletes | Event | Score | Seed | Opposition Score | Opposition Score | Opposition Score | Opposition Score | Opposition Score | Rank |
|---|---|---|---|---|---|---|---|---|---|
| Jason Hurnall (AUS); Milena Gațco (MDA) | Mixed team | 1301 | 10 | Trydvornava (BLR); Ovchynnikov (UKR); L 3–5 | did not advance | | | | 17 |
| Laura Paeglis (AUS); Youssof Tolba (EGY) | Mixed team | 1299 | 17 | Giannasio (ARG); Soithong (THA); L 2–6 | did not advance | | | | 17 |

== Athletics ==
Track

| Athlete | Event | Stage 1 | | Stage 2 | | Final Placing |
| Athlete | Event | Result | Rank | Result | Rank | Final Placing |
|---|---|---|---|---|---|---|
| Keegan Bell | Men's 400m | 49.58 | 2 | 49.05 | 3 | 9 |
| Anthony Vlatko | Men's 800m | 1:54.34 | 4 | 1:54.34 | 8 | 8 |
| Luke Young | Men's 1500m/Cross Country | 3:55.28 | 5 | 12:28 | 26 | 3rd place, bronze medalist(s) |
| Thomas Throssell | Men's 400m Hurdles | 54.22 | 4 | 53.27 | 1 | 7 |
| Keely Small | Women's 800m | 2:05.68 | 1 | 2:04.76 | 1 | 1st place, gold medalist(s) |
| Jaylah Hancock-Cameron | Women's 1500m/Cross Country | 4:18.44 | 2 | 13:16 | 9 | 2nd place, silver medalist(s) |
| Sophie White | Women's 100m Hurdles | 13.39 | 2 | 13.01 | 3 | 2 |
| Jamie Hiscock | Women's 2000m Steeplechase/Cross Country | 6:39.62 | 5 | 14:04 | 26 | 5 |

Field

| Athlete | Event | Stage 1 | | Stage 2 | | Final Placing |
| Athlete | Event | Result | Rank | Result | Rank | Final Placing |
|---|---|---|---|---|---|---|
| Oscar Miers | Men's High Jump | 2.05 | 7 | 2.22 | 2 | 2nd place, silver medalist(s) |
| Joshua Cowley | Men's Long Jump | 7.71 | 1 | 7.82 | 2 | 2nd place, silver medalist(s) |
| Elizabeth Moss | Women's High Jump | 1.78 | 4 | 1.82 | 3 | 4 |
| Sally Shokry | Women's Discus Throw | 44.56 | 11 | 46.79 | 8 | 10 |
| Rochelle Vicller | Women's Hammer Throw | 60.76 | 11 | 56.45 | 12 | 10 |

== Badminton ==
Singles

| Athlete | Event | Group stage | | | | Quarterfinal | Semifinal | Final / BM | Rank |
| Athlete | Event | Opposition Score | Opposition Score | Opposition Score | Rank | Opposition Score | Opposition Score | Opposition Score | Rank |
|---|---|---|---|---|---|---|---|---|---|
| Zecily Fung | Women's singles | Huang (TPE); L (12–21, 11–21) | Lima (BRA); L (11–21, 21–15, 17–21) | Lindes (NED); W (23–21, 21–19) | 4 | did not advance | | | 9 |

Team

| Athlete | Event | Group stage | | | | Quarterfinal | Semifinal | Final / BM | Rank |
| Athlete | Event | Opposition Score | Opposition Score | Opposition Score | Rank | Opposition Score | Opposition Score | Opposition Score | Rank |
|---|---|---|---|---|---|---|---|---|---|
| Team Theta; Zecily Fung (AUS); Julien Carraggi (BEL); Mohamed Mostafa Kamel (EGY); Kodai Naraoka (JPN); Lukas Resch (GER); Jaqueline Lima (BRA); Hirari Mizui (JPN); Tereza Švábíková (CZE) | Mixed Teams | Sigma (MIX); L (100–110) | Omega (MIX); L (100–110) | Gamma (MIX); L (107–110) | 4Q | Delta (MIX); W (110–93) | Alpha (MIX); L (90–110) | Zeta (MIX); W (110–107) | 3rd place, bronze medalist(s) |

== Basketball ==
| Event | Group stage | | | | Quarterfinal | Semifinal | Final / BM | |
| Event | Opposition Score | Opposition Score | Opposition Score | Opposition Score | Opposition Score | Opposition Score | Opposition Score | Rank |
|---|---|---|---|---|---|---|---|---|
| Girls' tournament | Netherlands; W 11–7 | Czech Republic; W 15–11 | Spain; L 7–12 | Estonia; W 19–15 | Ukraine; W 16–6 | France; L 20–19 | China; W 16–13 | 3rd place, bronze medalist(s) |

== Beach volleyball ==
Australia qualified a boys' and girls' team based on their performance at the 2018 Oceania U19 Championship.

- Boys' tournament - 1 team of 2 athletes
- Girls' tournament - 1 team of 2 athletes

| Athletes | Event | Preliminary round | Round of 16 | Quarterfinals | Semifinals | Final / BM | |
| Athletes | Event | Opposition Score | Opposition Score | Opposition Score | Opposition Score | Opposition Score | Rank |
|---|---|---|---|---|---|---|---|
| Mark Nicolaidis; James Takken | Boys' | Zuliani–J.Pedro (BRA); W 2–1; Calvo–Chacon (BOL); W 2–0 de Groot–Immers (NED); L 0–2 | Bello–Bello (GBR); L 0–2 | did not advance | | | |
| Tiaan Smith; Lauren Taylor | Girls' | Newberry–Sparks (USA); L 0–2 Villar–Churin (ARG); L 0–2; Baumann–Betschart (SUI); L 0–2 | did not advance | | | | |

== Boxing ==
Australia selected three athletes to compete based on their performance at the 2018 Youth Oceania Confederation Boxing Championships.

- Boys' -69 kg - Kiwa King
- Boys' +91 kg - Jai Dennis
- Girls' -60 kg - Emma Lawson

Summary

Key:

- RSC – Referee stops contest.
- NC – No contest.

Boys

| Athlete | Event | Preliminary | | Semifinals | Final / BM / PM | |
| Athlete | Event | Round 1 | Round 2 | Semifinals | Final / BM / PM | |
| Athlete | Event | Opposition Result | Opposition Result | Opposition Result | Opposition Result | Rank |
|---|---|---|---|---|---|---|
| Jai Ropata Dennis | 91+ kg | Egy Elsawy Awad Elbaz (EGY); L RSC | Dronov (RUS); L 0–5 | —N/a | Tuigamala (SAM); T NC | 5 |

Girls

| Athlete | Event | Preliminary | Semifinals | Final / BM | |
| Athlete | Event | Opposition Result | Opposition Result | Opposition Result | Rank |
|---|---|---|---|---|---|
| Emma Lawson | -60 kg | Aramokola (NGR); W 5–0 | Buapa (THA); L 0–5 | Saputo (ARG); L 0–5 | 4 |

== Canoeing ==
Australia qualified one boat based on its performance at the 2018 World Qualification Event.

- Girls' K1 - Jenaya Massie

Summary
Girls

| Athlete | Event | Qualification | | Repechage | | Round of 16 | Quarterfinals | Semifinals | Final / BM | Rank |
| Athlete | Event | Time | Rank | Time | Rank | Opposition Result | Opposition Result | Opposition Result | Opposition Result | Rank |
|---|---|---|---|---|---|---|---|---|---|---|
Jenaya Massie
| Jenaya Massie | K1 sprint | 2:02.43 | 12 Q | 1:28.08 | 4 Q | Sukhanova (KAZ); L 2:04.300 | did not advance | | | 11 |
| Jenaya Massie | K1 slalom | 1:30.34 | 16 Q | 1:28.08 | 4 Q | Lewandowski (GER); L 1:27.580 | did not advance | | | 10 |

== Diving ==
Matthew Carter competed in the boys' 3m springboard event and Alysha Koloi competed in the girls' 3m springboard event.

| Athlete | Event | Preliminary | | Final | |
| Athlete | Event | Points | Rank | Points | Rank |
|---|---|---|---|---|---|
| Matthew Carter | Boys' 3 m springboard | 525.45 | 3 | 543.25 | 4 |
| Alysha Koloi | Girls' 3 m springboard | 185.65 | 15 | did not advance | |

== Equestrian ==
Australia qualified a rider based on its ranking in the FEI World Jumping Challenge Rankings.

- Individual Jumping - Madeline Sinderberry

Summary

| Athlete | Horse | Event | Qualification | | | | | Final | | | | | Total | |
| Athlete | Horse | Event | Round 1 | | Round 2 | | | Round A | | Round B | | | Total | |
| Athlete | Horse | Event | Penalties | Rank | Penalties | Total | Rank | Penalties | Rank | Penalties | Total | Rank | Penalties | Rank |
|---|---|---|---|---|---|---|---|---|---|---|---|---|---|---|
| Madi Sinderberry | Zambo | Individual | —N/a | | | | | 0 | =1 Q | 4 | 4 | 9r | 4 | 9 |
| Mix Australasia; Almarzooqi (UAE); Najafinia (IRI); Burnett-Grant (NZL); Alqashouti (QAT); Sinderberry (AUS) | La Corina Lala; La Trinidad; Milagro Maximo; Pietro; Zambo | Team | 24 | =1 Q | 36 | 60 | 5 | —N/a | | | | | 60 | 4 |

== Fencing ==
Australia qualified two athletes based on its performance at the 2018 Cadet World Championship.

- Boys' Foil - Robert Ciccarelli
- Girls' Foil - Giorgia Salmas

== Golf ==
Individual

| Athlete | Event | Round 1 | | Round 2 | | | Round 3 | | | Total | | |
| Athlete | Event | Score | Rank | Score | Total | Rank | Score | Total | Rank | Score | Par | Rank |
|---|---|---|---|---|---|---|---|---|---|---|---|---|
| Grace Kim | Girls' Individual | 71 (+1) | 2 | 69 (-1) | 140 | 1 | 71 (+1) | 211 | 2 | 211 | +1 | 1st place, gold medalist(s) |
| Karl Vilips | Boys' Individual | 69 (-1) | 1 | 68 (-2) | 137 | 1 | 69 (-1) | 206 | 3 | 206 | -4 | 1st place, gold medalist(s) |

Team

| Athletes | Event | Round 1 (Fourball) | | Round 2 (Foursome) | | Round 3 (Individual Stroke) | | | | Total | | |
| Athletes | Event | Score | Rank | Score | Rank | Girl | Boy | Total | Rank | Score | Par | Rank |
|---|---|---|---|---|---|---|---|---|---|---|---|---|
| Grace Kim; Karl Vilips | Mixed team | 65 (-5) | 10 | 71 (+1) | 6 | 76 | 72 | 148 (+8) | 16 | 284 | +4 | 9 |

== Gymnastics ==
=== Artistic ===
Australia qualified one gymnast based on its performance at the 2018 Oceania Junior Championship.

- Girls' artistic individual all-around - 1 quota

=== Rhythmic ===
Australia qualified one gymnast based on its performance at the 2018 Oceania Junior Championship.

- Girls' rhythmic individual all-around - Lidiia Iakovleva

=== Trampoline ===
Australia qualified two gymnasts based on its performance at the 2018 Oceania Junior Championship.

- Boys' trampoline - Liam Christie
- Girls' trampoline - Jessica Pickering

== Modern pentathlon ==
Australia qualified two pentathletes based on its performance at the Asian/Oceanian Youth Olympic Games Qualifier.

- Boys' Individual - Keaan Van Venrooij
- Girls' Individual - Nikita Mawhirt

== Roller speed skating ==
Australia qualified two roller skaters based on its performance at the 2018 Roller Speed Skating World Championship.

- Boys' combined speed event - Alexander Myint
- Girls' combined speed event - Giselle Stogdale

== Rowing ==
Australia qualified one boat based on its performance at the 2017 World Junior Rowing Championships. They would also qualify a girls' single sculls boat at the Oceania Youth Olympic Games Qualification event.

- Boys' single sculls - Cormac Kennedy-Leverett
- Girls' single sculls - Taylor McCarthy-Smith

== Sailing ==
Australia qualified two boats based on its performance at the Oceania Techno 293+ Youth Olympic Games Qualifier. They also qualified another boat at the 2018 World Nacra 15 Championship. A quota in the IKA Twin Tip Racing was achieved at the Asian and Oceania IKA Twin Tip Racing Qualifiers.

- Boys' Techno 293+ - Alex Halank
- Boys' IKA Twin Tip Racing - Mani Bisschops
- Girls' Techno 293+ - Hailey Lea
- Mixed Nacra 15 - Will Cooley & Evie Haseldine

== Shooting ==
Australia qualified three sport shooters based on its performance at the 2017 Oceania Championships.

- Boys' 10m Air Rifle - Alex Hoberg
- Girls' 10m Air Rifle - Victoria Rossiter
- Girls' 10m Air Pistol - Olivia Erickson

Individual

| Athlete | Event | Qualification | | Final | |
| Athlete | Event | Points | Rank | Points | Rank |
|---|---|---|---|---|---|
| Alex Hoberg | Boys' 10 metre air rifle | 623.4 | 4 | 183.9 | 5 |
| Victoria Rossiter | Girls' 10 metre air rifle | 624.3 | 4 | 118.9 | 8 |
| Olivia Kate Erickson | Girls' 10 metre air pistol | 553-5 | 14 | did not advance | |

Team

| Athletes | Event | Qualification | | Round of 16 | Quarterfinals | Semifinals | Final / BM | Rank |
| Athletes | Event | Points | Rank | Opposition Result | Opposition Result | Opposition Result | Opposition Result | Rank |
|---|---|---|---|---|---|---|---|---|
| Victoria Michelle Venning Rossiter (AUS); Hayk Babayan (ARM) | Mixed Team 10m Air Rifle | 826.0 | 3 | Janssen (GER); Mudiyanselage (SRI); W 10–9 | Dereviagina (RUS); Ramírez Ramos (MEX); L 4–10 | did not advance | | |
| Farida Darwish (EGY); Alex Chresten Hoberg (AUS) | Mixed Team 10m Air Rifle | 825.9 | 5 | Benetti (ITA); Mahardika (INA); L 6–10 | did not advance | | | |
| Olivia Kate Erickson (AUS); Pavel Schejbal (CZE) | Mixed 10 metre air pistol | 749-12 | 7 | al-Kaabi (IRQ); Son (BEL); L 9–10 | did not advance | | | |

== Sport climbing ==
Australia qualified one sport climber based on its performance at the 2017 Oceania Youth Sport Climbing Championships.

- Boys' combined - Ned Middlehurst

== Swimming ==
Australia selected 8 athletes (4 boys and 4 girls) to compete in swimming.

Boys

- Lewis Blackburn
- Ashton Brinkworth
- Joseph Jackson
- Stuart Swinburn

Girls

- Chelsea Hodges
- Kaylee McKeown
- Michaela Ryan
- Abbey Webb

== Triathlon ==
Australia qualified two athletes based on its performance at the 2018 Oceania Youth Olympic Games Qualifier.

Individual

| Athlete | Event | Swim (750m) | Trans 1 | Bike (20 km) | Trans 2 | Run (5 km) | Total Time | Rank |
|---|---|---|---|---|---|---|---|---|
| Joshua Ferris | Boys | 10:49 | 0:31 | 28:28 | 0:29 | 16:51 | 57:08 | 18 |
| Charlotte Derbyshire | Girls | 10:35 | 0:45 | 31:21 | 0:31 | 19:24 | 1:02:36 | 18 |

Relay

| Athlete | Event | Total Times per Athlete (Swim 250m, Bike 6.6 km, Run 1.8 km) | Total Group Time | Rank |
|---|---|---|---|---|
| Oceania 1 Charlotte Derbyshire (AUS); Dylan McCullough (NZL); Brea Roderick (NZL); Joshua Ferris (AUS) | Mixed Relay | 22:26 (5); 19:51 (1); 23:00 (2); 21:15 (2) | 1:26:32 | 2nd place, silver medalist(s) |

== Weightlifting ==
Boy

| Athlete | Event | Snatch | | Clean & Jerk | | Total | Rank |
| Athlete | Event | Result | Rank | Result | Rank | Total | Rank |
|---|---|---|---|---|---|---|---|
| Jett Gaffney | −62 kg | 88 | 12 | 112 | 12 | 200 | 12 |

Girl

| Athlete | Event | Snatch | | Clean & jerk | | Total | Rank |
| Athlete | Event | Result | Rank | Result | Rank | Total | Rank |
|---|---|---|---|---|---|---|---|
| Maddison Power | −53 kg | 60 | 7 | 77 | 7 | 137 | 7 |

== Wrestling ==
Australia qualified one athlete based on their performance at the 2018 Oceania Cadet Championships.

Key:
- VSU – Without any point scored by the opponent

| Athlete | Event | Group stage | | | Final / RM | Rank |
| Athlete | Event | Opposition Score | Opposition Score | Rank | Opposition Score | Rank |
|---|---|---|---|---|---|---|
| Thomas Barns | Boys' freestyle −110kg | Zare (IRI); L 0 – 11 ^{VSU} | Khalil (EGY); L 0 – 10 ^{VSU} | 3 Q | Velinov (MKD); W 10 – 0 ^{VSU} | 5 |
