= Athletics at the 2018 Summer Youth Olympics – Boys' javelin throw =

Boys' javelin throw at the III Summer Youth Olympic Games
- Venue: Parque Polideportivo Roca
- Date: 13, 16 October
- Competitors: 17 from 17 nations

Medalists
1st place, gold medalist(s)		Topias Laine	Finland
2nd place, silver medalist(s)		Gustavo Osorio	Argentina
3rd place, bronze medalist(s)		Martin Florian	Czech Republic

The boys' javelin throw competition at the 2018 Summer Youth Olympics was held on 13 and 16 October at the Parque Polideportivo Roca.

== Schedule ==
All times are in local time (UTC-3).

Date	Time	Round
13 October 2018	16:15	Stage 1
16 October 2018	16:46	Stage 2

== Results ==
=== Stage 1 ===
Rank	Athlete	Nation	1	2	3	4	Result	Notes
1	Jano Esterhuizen	South Africa	69.11	77.69	59.89	68.88	77.69	PB
2	Gustavo Osorio	Argentina	76.03	72.10	x	71.83	76.03	PB
3	Topias Laine	Finland	74.57	72.26	70.61	73.98	74.57	
4	Jean Mairongo	Ecuador	70.14	74.32	67.89	72.47	74.32	PB
5	Martin Florian	Czech Republic	71.95	67.06	71.40	74.00	74.00	PB
6	Ahmet Toyran	Turkey	63.97	70.79	69.58	73.01	73.01	PB
7	Ita Leshan	Kenya	72.73	63.86	x	69.15	72.73	PB
8	Guilherme Moreira	Brazil	72.56	x	65.22	x	72.56	PB
9	Kunwer Rana	India	70.27	x	71.10	71.45	71.45	
10	Răzvan Cărare	Romania	68.70	70.07	68.14	68.65	70.07	
11	Lenny Brisseault	France	66.61	63.17	x	x	66.61	
12	Gerasimos Kalogerakis	Greece	63.04	x	66.44	x	66.44	
13	Kentaro Nakamura	Japan	x	52.00	x	66.31	66.31	
14	David Schepp	Germany	63.49	61.77	58.18	65.44	65.44	
15	Armando Caballero	Panama	63.74	x	58.20	x	63.74	
16	Marek Mucha	Poland	x	x	x	61.43	61.43	
	Abdulaziz Al-Hemdan	Kuwait	x	r			NM	

=== Stage 2 ===
Rank	Athlete	Nation	1	2	3	4	Result	Notes
1	Topias Laine	Finland	76.36	71.11	78.85	72.43	78.85	PB
2	Martin Florian	Czech Republic	72.14	73.85	72.01	76.24	76.24	PB
3	Kunwer Rana	India	x	72.46	75.06	x	75.06	
4	Ita Leshan	Kenya	61.00	x	x	74.52	74.52	PB
5	Gustavo Osorio	Argentina	x	74.25	72.44	71.32	74.25	
6	Jean Mairongo	Ecuador	68.30	x	72.22	70.38	72.22	
7	Ahmet Toyran	Turkey	68.38	71.23	x	x	71.23	
8	Răzvan Cărare	Romania	64.90	69.98	68.75	69.20	69.98	
9	Guilherme Moreira	Brazil	67.42	68.97	67.28	x	68.97	
10	Lenny Brisseault	France	64.79	x	65.60	65.14	65.60	
11	Jano Esterhuizen	South Africa	65.59	x	x	65.48	65.59	
12	Kentaro Nakamura	Japan	x	61.54	64.55	53.40	64.55	
13	Armando Caballero	Panama	61.12	64.45	x	60.29	64.45	
14	David Schepp	Germany	50.78	61.18	60.51	64.23	64.23	
15	Marek Mucha	Poland	x	63.59	53.28	59.30	63.59	
16	Gerasimos Kalogerakis	Greece	49.78	61.23	63.56	52.96	63.56	
	Abdulaziz Al-Hemdan	Kuwait					DNS	

=== Final placing ===
Rank	Athlete	Nation	Stage 1	Stage 2	Total
1st place, gold medalist(s)	Topias Laine	Finland	74.57	78.85	153.42
2nd place, silver medalist(s)	Gustavo Osorio	Argentina	76.03	74.25	150.28
3rd place, bronze medalist(s)	Martin Florian	Czech Republic	74.00	76.24	150.24
4	Ita Leshan	Kenya	72.73	74.52	147.25
5	Jean Mairongo	Ecuador	74.32	72.22	146.54
6	Kunwer Rana	India	71.45	75.06	146.51
7	Ahmet Toyran	Turkey	73.01	71.23	144.24
8	Jano Esterhuizen	South Africa	77.69	65.59	143.28
9	Guilherme Moreira	Brazil	72.56	68.97	141.53
10	Răzvan Cărare	Romania	70.07	69.98	140.05
11	Lenny Brisseault	France	66.61	65.60	132.21
12	Kentaro Nakamura	Japan	66.31	64.55	130.86
13	Gerasimos Kalogerakis	Greece	66.44	63.56	130.00
14	David Schepp	Germany	65.44	64.23	129.67
15	Armando Caballero	Panama	63.74	64.45	128.19
16	Marek Mucha	Poland	61.43	63.59	125.02
	Abdulaziz Al-Hemdan	Kuwait	NM	DNS	
