= Athletics at the 2018 Summer Youth Olympics – Boys' 1500 metres =

Boys' 1500 metres at the III Summer Youth Olympic Games
- Venue: Parque Polideportivo Roca
- Date: 12 October and 15 October 2018
- Competitors: 23 from 23 nations

Medalists
1st place, gold medalist(s)		Jean de Dieu Butoyi	Burundi
2nd place, silver medalist(s)		Anass Essayi	Morocco
3rd place, bronze medalist(s)		Melese Nberet	Ethiopia

The boys' 1500 metres competition at the 2018 Summer Youth Olympics was held on 12 and 15 October, at the Parque Polideportivo Roca.

== Schedule ==
All times are in local time (UTC-3).

Date	Time	Round
12 October 2018	16:00	Stage 1
15 October 2018	10:00	Cross Country

== Results ==
=== Stage 1 ===
Rank	Heat	Athlete	Nation	Result	Notes
1	2	Melese Nberet	Ethiopia	3:52.95	
2	2	Anass Essayi	Morocco	3:53.75	
3	1	Jean de Dieu Butoyi	Burundi	3:54.32	
4	2	Meron Goitom	Eritrea	3:54.39	
5	2	Nabil Mahdi Djama	Djibouti	3:55.04	
6	1	Corentin Texier	France	3:55.20	PB
7	2	Luke Young	Australia	3:55.28	
8	2	Andrej Paulíny	Slovakia	3:56.08	
9	1	Lucas Pinho Leite	Brazil	3:56.29	
10	1	Oleksandr Honskyi	Ukraine	3:56.39	
11	1	Kosuke Ishida	Japan	3:57.25	SB
12	2	Nickson Lesiyia Pariken	Kenya	3:59.11	
13	1	Hugo de Miguel	Spain	3:59.53	
14	2	Leopoldo Rincon Valtierra	Mexico	4:00.28	
15	2	Hamdani Benahamed	Algeria	4:01.72	
16	2	Carlos Vilches	Puerto Rico	4:05.93	
17	2	Bence Apáti	Hungary	4:08.21	
18	2	Yusuf Ali Abdirashid	Somalia	4:08.66	
19	2	Tarik Demir	Turkey	4:12.37	
20	1	Manuel Belo	Timor-Leste	4:13.41	
21	1	Kinley Tshering	Bhutan	4:15.15	PB
22	1	Tefo Khoahla	Lesotho	4:32.98	
23	1	Moukhtar Soule	Mauritania	5:17.05	PB

=== Cross Country ===
Rank	Overall rank	Athlete	Nation	Result	Notes
1	4	Jean de Dieu Butoyi	Burundi	11:31	
2	6	Anass Essayi	Morocco	11:35	
3	7	Melese Nberet	Ethiopia	11:38	
4	8	Nickson Lesiyia Pariken	Kenya	11:48	
5	10	Kosuke Ishida	Japan	11:52	
6	12	Nabil Mahdi Djama	Djibouti	11:53	
7	26	Luke Young	Australia	12:28	
8	28	Leopoldo Rincon Valtierra	Mexico	12:30	
9	29	Carlos Vilches	Puerto Rico	12:32	
10	33	Hugo de Miguel	Spain	12:36	
11	34	Andrej Paulíny	Slovakia	12:36	
12	37	Lucas Pinho Leite	Brazil	12:43	
13	41	Tarik Demir	Turkey	12:48	
14	42	Meron Goitom	Eritrea	12:49	
15	44	Oleksandr Honskyi	Ukraine	12:58	
16	46	Kinley Tshering	Bhutan	13:10	
17	47	Tefo Khoahla	Lesotho	13:13	
18	48	Bence Apáti	Hungary	13:14	
19	49	Corentin Texier	France	13:15	
20	50	Yusuf Ali Abdirashid	Somalia	13:42	
		Hamdani Benahamed	Algeria	DNF	
		Manuel Belo	Timor-Leste	DNS	
		Moukhtar Soule	Mauritania	DNS	

=== Final placing ===
Rank	Athlete	Nation	Stage 1	Cross Country	Total
1st place, gold medalist(s)	Jean de Dieu Butoyi	Burundi	3	1	4
2nd place, silver medalist(s)	Anass Essayi	Morocco	2	2	4
3rd place, bronze medalist(s)	Melese Nberet	Ethiopia	1	3	4
4	Nabil Mahdi Djama	Djibouti	5	6	11
5	Luke Young	Australia	7	7	14
6	Nickson Lesiyia Pariken	Kenya	12	4	16
7	Kosuke Ishida	Japan	11	5	16
8	Meron Goitom	Eritrea	4	14	18
9	Andrej Paulíny	Slovakia	8	11	19
10	Lucas Pinho Leite	Brazil	9	12	21
11	Leopoldo Rincon Valtierra	Mexico	14	8	22
12	Hugo de Miguel	Spain	13	10	23
13	Carlos Vilches	Puerto Rico	16	9	25
14	Oleksandr Honskyi	Ukraine	10	15	25
15	Corentin Texier	France	6	19	25
16	Tarik Demir	Turkey	19	13	32
17	Bence Apáti	Hungary	17	18	35
18	Kinley Tshering	Bhutan	21	16	37
19	Yusuf Ali Abdirashid	Somalia	18	20	38
20	Tefo Khoahla	Lesotho	22	17	39
	Manuel Belo	Timor-Leste	20	DNS	
	Hamdani Benahamed	Algeria	15	DNF	
	Moukhtar Soule	Mauritania	23	DNS	
