= Angola at the 2018 Summer Youth Olympics =

- IOC code: ANG
- NOC: Angolan Olympic Committee

in Buenos Aires, Argentina 6 – 18 October 2018
- Competitors: 1 in 1 sport
- Medals: Gold 0 Silver 0 Bronze 0 Total 0

Summer Youth Olympics appearances
- 2010; 2014; 2018

Angola participated at the 2018 Summer Youth Olympics in Buenos Aires, Argentina from 6 October to 18 October 2018.

== Athletics ==
Track

Athlete	Event	Stage 1	Stage 2	Final Placing
Manuel Jacinto Chivela	Men's 800m	1:58.08	1:58.20	20
