= 2023 European Athletics U23 Championships – Men's 3000 metres steeplechase =

Men's 3000 metres steeplechase at the 2023 European Athletics U23 Championships
- Venue: Leppävaara Stadium
- Location: Espoo, Finland
- Dates: 15 July (heats); 16 July (final)
- Competitors: 36 from 21 nations
- Winning time: 8:28.91

Medalists
gold medal	Alejandro Quijada	Spain
silver medal	Etson Barros	Portugal
bronze medal	Baptiste Guyon	France

The men's 3000 metres steeplechase event at the 2023 European Athletics U23 Championships was held in Espoo, Finland, at Leppävaara Stadium on 15 and 16 July.

== Records ==
Prior to the competition, the records were as follows:

European U23 record	Günther Weidlinger (AUT)	8:10.83	Sevilla, Spain	21 August 1999
Championship U23 record	Martin Pröll (AUT)	8:25.86	Bydgoszcz, Poland	19 July 2003

== Results ==
=== Heats ===
First 5 in each heat (Q) will qualify for the final.

==== Heat 1 ====
Place	Athlete	Nation	Time	Notes
1	Valentin Bresc	France	8:44.52	Q
2	Florian Zittel	Germany	8:44.70	Q, PB
3	Maciej Megier	Poland	8:50.10	Q
4	Clément Labar	Belgium	8:51.12	Q
5	Pedro Garcia Palencia	Spain	8:52.01	Q
6	Gil Weicherding	Luxembourg	8:58.34	
7	João Pais	Portugal	8:58.93	
8	Martin Kováčech	Czech Republic	9:03.27	
9	Didrik Røssum Jensen	Norway	9:05.09	PB
10	Carmelo Cannizzaro	Italy	9:10.79	
11	Nils Bredin	Sweden	9:16.68	
—	Sean McGinley	Ireland	DNF	

==== Heat 2 ====
Place	Athlete	Nation	Time	Notes
1	Luc le Baron	France	8:51.00	Q
2	Tomáš Habarta	Czech Republic	8:51.27	Q
3	Carlos Ángel	Spain	8:51.44	Q
4	Eduardo Pestana	Portugal	8:51.90	Q, PB
5	Adam Kołodziej	Poland	8:52.23	Q
6	Maxim Wyss	Switzerland	8:53.12	PB
7	Baran Ergüven	Turkey	9:03.85	
8	Thomas Bridger	Great Britain	9:10.39	
9	Nestoras Kolios	Greece	9:12.01	
10	Jesper Lundin	Norway	9:12.02	
11	Robin Müller	Germany	9:13.46	
12	Ruslan Naumov	Ukraine	10:07.80	

==== Heat 3 ====
Place	Athlete	Nation	Time	Notes
1	Etson Barros	Portugal	8:45.84	Q
2	Baptiste Guyon	France	8:46.01	Q
3	Cesare Caiani	Italy	8:48.99	Q, PB
4	Alejandro Quijada	Spain	8:50.67	Q
5	Luca Minale	Great Britain	8:52.26	Q
6	Adam Ochnik	Poland	9:01.32	
7	Damian Didier Mititelu	Romania	9:05.81	
8	Tomer Mualem	Israel	9:06.73	SB
9	Samuel Auvinen	Finland	9:16.41	
10	James Dunne	Ireland	9:26.25	
11	Jonas Schaub	Switzerland	9:34.70	
—	Vebjørn Hovdejord	Norway	DNF	

=== Final ===
Place	Athlete	Nation	Time	Notes
1st place, gold medalist(s)	Alejandro Quijada	Spain	8:28.91	PB
2nd place, silver medalist(s)	Etson Barros	Portugal	8:32.08	
3rd place, bronze medalist(s)	Baptiste Guyon	France	8:33.64	
4	Valentin Bresc	France	8:42.48	
5	Tomáš Habarta	Czech Republic	8:42.80	PB
6	Cesare Caiani	Italy	8:43.74	PB
7	Luc le Baron	France	8:45.45	
8	Clément Labar	Belgium	8:47.38	
9	Carlos Ángel	Spain	8:51.27	
10	Eduardo Pestana	Portugal	8:51.83	PB
11	Maciej Megier	Poland	8:53.70	
12	Adam Kołodziej	Poland	8:57.38	
13	Luca Minale	Great Britain	9:02.18	
14	Florian Zittel	Germany	9:08.31	
—	Pedro Garcia Palencia	Spain	DQ	
