= Lesotho at the 2018 Summer Youth Olympics =

- IOC code: LES
- NOC: Lesotho National Olympic Committee

in Buenos Aires, Argentina 6 – 18 October 2018
- Competitors: 2 in 1 sport
- Medals: Gold 0 Silver 0 Bronze 0 Total 0

Summer Youth Olympics appearances
- 2010; 2014; 2018

Lesotho participated at the 2018 Summer Youth Olympics in Buenos Aires, Argentina from 6 October to 18 October 2018.

== Athletics ==
Athlete	Event	Stage 1		Stage 2		Total	
Athlete	Event	Result	Rank	Result	Rank	Total	Rank
Tefo Khoahla	Boys' 1500 metres	4:32.98	22	13:13	17	39	20
Malineo Adelina Mofolo	Girls' 3000 metres	11:07.40	20	15:44	19	38	18
