= Alejandro Quijada =

Spanish steeplechaser (born 2001)

Personal information
- Full name: Alejandro Quijada Sánchez
- Born: 7 March 2001 (age 25)

Sport
- Sport: Athletics
- Event: Steeplechase
Medal record
Men's athletics
Representing Spain
Ibero-American Championships
Gold medal – first place	2024 Cuiabá	3000 m s'chase
European Athletics U23 Championships
Gold medal – first place	2023 Espoo	3000 m s'chase
Summer World University Games
Silver medal – second place	2025 Bochum	3000 m s'chase

Alejandro Quijada Sánchez (born 7 March 2001) is a Spanish steeplechaser.At the 2023 European Athletics U23 Championships, he won the gold medal in the 3000 m steeplechase.

== Biography ==
From Madrid, Quijada won the gold medal in the 3000 m steeplechase at the 2023 European Athletics U23 Championships in Espoo, Finland.

He won the gold medal in the 3000 m steeplechase at the 2024 Ibero-American Championships in Athletics in Brazil. In June, he represented Spain at the 2024 European Athletics Championships in Rome.

In July 2025, he won the silver medal at the World University Games in Bochum running 8:20.70 to finish behind Luxembourg's Ruben Querinjean. In September 2025, he competed for Spain at the 2025 World Athletics Championships in Tokyo, without advancing to the final.

In August, he finished sixth in the final of the 3000 metres steeplechase at the 2026 European Athletics Championships in Birmingham, England.
