= Athletics at the 2018 Summer Youth Olympics – Girls' 1500 metres =

Girls' 1500 metres at the III Summer Youth Olympic Games
- Venue: Parque Polideportivo Roca
- Date: 12 October and 15 October 2018
- Competitors: 18 from 18 nations

Medalists
1st place, gold medalist(s)		Edinah Jebitok	Kenya
2nd place, silver medalist(s)		Jaylah Hancock-Cameron	Australia
3rd place, bronze medalist(s)		Lemlem Hailu	Ethiopia

The girls 1500 metres competition at the 2018 Summer Youth Olympics was held on 12 and 15 October, at the Parque Polideportivo Roca.

== Schedule ==
All times are in local time (UTC-3).

Date	Time	Round
12 October 2018	15:40	Stage 1
15 October 2018	10:30	Cross Country

== Results ==
=== Stage 1 ===
Rank	Heat	Athlete	Nation	Result	Notes
1	2	Edinah Jebitok	Kenya	4:16.68	
2	2	Jaylah Hancock-Cameron	Australia	4:18.44	PB
3	2	Meryeme Azrour	Morocco	4:21.22	
4	2	Yuki Kanemitsu	Japan	4:24.41	
5	1	Lemlem Hailu	Ethiopia	4:25.03	SB
6	2	Antje Pfüller	Germany	4:25.14	
7	2	Nicole Louw	South Africa	4:27.06	
8	2	Nathalie Blomqvist	Finland	4:29.50	
9	1	Laura Elena Acuña Vidal	Chile	4:31.00	
10	2	Klaudia Kazimierska	Poland	4:34.22	
11	1	Kendra Lewis	Canada	4:35.15	
12	2	Anastasiya Paluyan	Belarus	4:37.27	
13	1	Đoàn Thu Hằng	Vietnam	4:41.17	
14	1	Lena Kieffer	Luxembourg	4:43.97	
15	1	Privillege Chikara	Zimbabwe	4:49.18	
16	1	Louris Danoun	Syria	5:00.92	
17	1	Khanyisile Hlatshwako	Eswatini	5:12.56	
18	1	Nurul Amirah Karim	Brunei	6:38.18	

=== Cross Country ===
Rank	Overall rank	Athlete	Nation	Result	Notes
1	2	Edinah Jebitok	Kenya	12:37	
2	5	Lemlem Hailu	Ethiopia	13:11	
3	8	Yuki Kanemitsu	Japan	13:13	
4	9	Jaylah Hancock-Cameron	Australia	13:16	
5	14	Meryeme Azrour	Morocco	13:33	
6	16	Nathalie Blomqvist	Finland	13:38	
7	18	Kendra Lewis	Canada	13:51	
8	22	Antje Pfüller	Germany	13:56	
9	24	Đoàn Thu Hằng	Vietnam	14:02	
10	25	Nicole Louw	South Africa	14:02	
11	29	Privillege Chikara	Zimbabwe	14:15	
12	36	Anastasiya Paluyan	Belarus	14:35	
13	37	Lena Kieffer	Luxembourg	14:36	
14	38	Laura Elena Acuña Vidal	Chile	14:37	
15	39	Klaudia Kazimierska	Poland	14:45	
16	51	Khanyisile Hlatshwako	Eswatini	16:00	
17	52	Nurul Amirah Karim	Brunei	21:00	
		Louris Danoun	Syria	DNS	

=== Final placing ===
Rank	Athlete	Nation	Stage 1	Cross Country	Total
1st place, gold medalist(s)	Edinah Jebitok	Kenya	1	1	2
2nd place, silver medalist(s)	Jaylah Hancock-Cameron	Australia	2	4	6
3rd place, bronze medalist(s)	Lemlem Hailu	Ethiopia	5	2	7
4	Yuki Kanemitsu	Japan	4	3	7
5	Meryeme Azrour	Morocco	3	5	8
6	Nathalie Blomqvist	Finland	8	6	14
7	Antje Pfüller	Germany	6	8	14
8	Nicole Louw	South Africa	7	10	17
9	Kendra Lewis	Canada	11	7	18
10	Đoàn Thu Hằng	Vietnam	13	9	22
11	Laura Elena Acuña Vidal	Chile	9	14	23
12	Anastasiya Paluyan	Belarus	12	12	24
13	Klaudia Kazimierska	Poland	10	15	25
14	Privillege Chikara	Zimbabwe	15	11	26
15	Lena Kieffer	Luxembourg	14	13	27
16	Khanyisile Hlatshwako	Eswatini	17	16	33
17	Nurul Amirah Karim	Brunei	18	17	35
	Louris Danoun	Syria	16	DNS	
