= Athletics at the 2018 Summer Youth Olympics – Girls' 800 metres =

Girls' 800 metres at the III Summer Youth Olympic Games
- Venue: Parque Polideportivo Roca
- Date: 11 October and 14 October 2018
- Competitors: 26 from 26 nations

Medalists
1st place, gold medalist(s)		Keely Small	Australia
2nd place, silver medalist(s)		Athing Mu	United States
3rd place, bronze medalist(s)		Hirut Meshesha	Ethiopia

The girls' 800 metres competition at the 2018 Summer Youth Olympics was held on 11 and 14 October, at the Parque Polideportivo Roca.

== Schedule ==
All times are in local time (UTC-3).

Date	Time	Round
Thursday, 11 October 2018	16:20	Stage 1
Sunday, 14 October 2018	15:00	Stage 2

== Results ==
=== Stage 1 ===
Rank	Heat	Lane	Athlete	Nation	Result	Notes
1	3	4	Keely Small	Australia	2:05.68	QH3
2	1	7	Sophia Volkmer	Germany	2:06.92	QH3, PB
3	1	3	Angela Ndungwa Munguti	Kenya	2:07.34	QH3
4	1	1	Athing Mu	United States	2:08.01	QH3
5	2	4	Hirut Meshesha	Ethiopia	2:08.35	QH3
6	3	2	Prudence Sekgodiso	South Africa	2:08.53	QH3
7	1	4	Svitlana Zhulzhyk	Ukraine	2:09.73	QH3
8	3	7	Maki Ueda	Japan	2:09.91	QH3
9	2	1	Patricija Cīrule	Latvia	2:10.80	QH2
10	3	6	Nais Racasan	France	2:11.30	QH2
11	2	8	Denisa Folková	Czech Republic	2:11.97	QH2
12	3	3	Liudmila Rudzko	Belarus	2:12.65	QH2
13	1	4	Eleni Ioannidou	Greece	2:14.43	QH2
14	2	7	Alicja Stój	Poland	2:14.80	QH2
15	2	3	Fanny Arendt	Luxembourg	2:16.30	QH2
16	1	2	Aleksandra Roljić	Bosnia and Herzegovina	2:16.43	QH2
17	2	6	Alisa Virtanen	Finland	2:16.82	QH2
18	1	6	Relaksa Dauti	Albania	2:16.98	QH1
19	1	8	Lucía Sicre	Spain	2:17.70	QH1
20	3	8	Sebah Amar	Eritrea	2:19.18	QH1
21	3	5	Nikolina Mandić	Serbia	2:20.35	QH1
22	2	2	Regina Deogratius Mpigachai	Tanzania	2:21.29	QH1
23	2	5	Mikaela Smith	Virgin Islands	2:23.92	QH1
24	3	3	Nada Ghrouf	Palestine	2:39.11	QH1
25	2	3	Amal Kowa	Sudan	2:49.50	QH1
	3	1	Zita Arusha Vincent	Saint Vincent and the Grenadines	DNF	QH1

=== Stage 2 ===
Rank	Heat	Lane	Athlete	Nation	Result	Notes
1	3	5	Keely Small	Australia	2:04.76	
2	3	3	Athing Mu	United States	2:05.23	
3	3	8	Hirut Meshesha	Ethiopia	2:06.25	
4	3	6	Sophia Volkmer	Germany	2:09.53	
5	3	2	Maki Ueda	Japan	2:10.06	
6	2	5	Patricija Cīrule	Latvia	2:10.08	
7	3	1	Svitlana Zhulzhyk	Ukraine	2:10.21	
8	2	6	Denisa Folková	Czech Republic	2:10.88	
9	3	4	Angela Ndungwa Munguti	Kenya	2:11.06	
10	2	7	Alicja Stój	Poland	2:11.52	
11	2	4	Liudmila Rudzko	Belarus	2:12.23	
12	1	7	Regina Deogratius Mpigachai	Tanzania	2:13.33	SB
13	2	8	Fanny Arendt	Luxembourg	2:13.64	
14	2	7	Eleni Ioannidou	Greece	2:14.22	
15	1	4	Sebah Amar	Eritrea	2:16.76	
16	2	1	Alisa Virtanen	Finland	2:17.50	
17	1	6	Lucía Sicre	Spain	2:17.96	
18	1	3	Relaksa Dauti	Albania	2:18.09	
19	1	5	Nikolina Mandić	Serbia	2:19.43	
20	1	7	Mikaela Smith	Virgin Islands	2:19.88	
21	2	2	Aleksandra Roljić	Bosnia and Herzegovina	2:20.01	
22	1	8	Nada Ghrouf	Palestine	2:34.69	
23	1	1	Amal Kowa	Sudan	2:49.13	
	3	7	Prudence Sekgodiso	South Africa	DQ	
	1	2	Zita Arusha Vincent	Saint Vincent and the Grenadines	DNS	
	2	3	Nais Racasan	France	DNS	

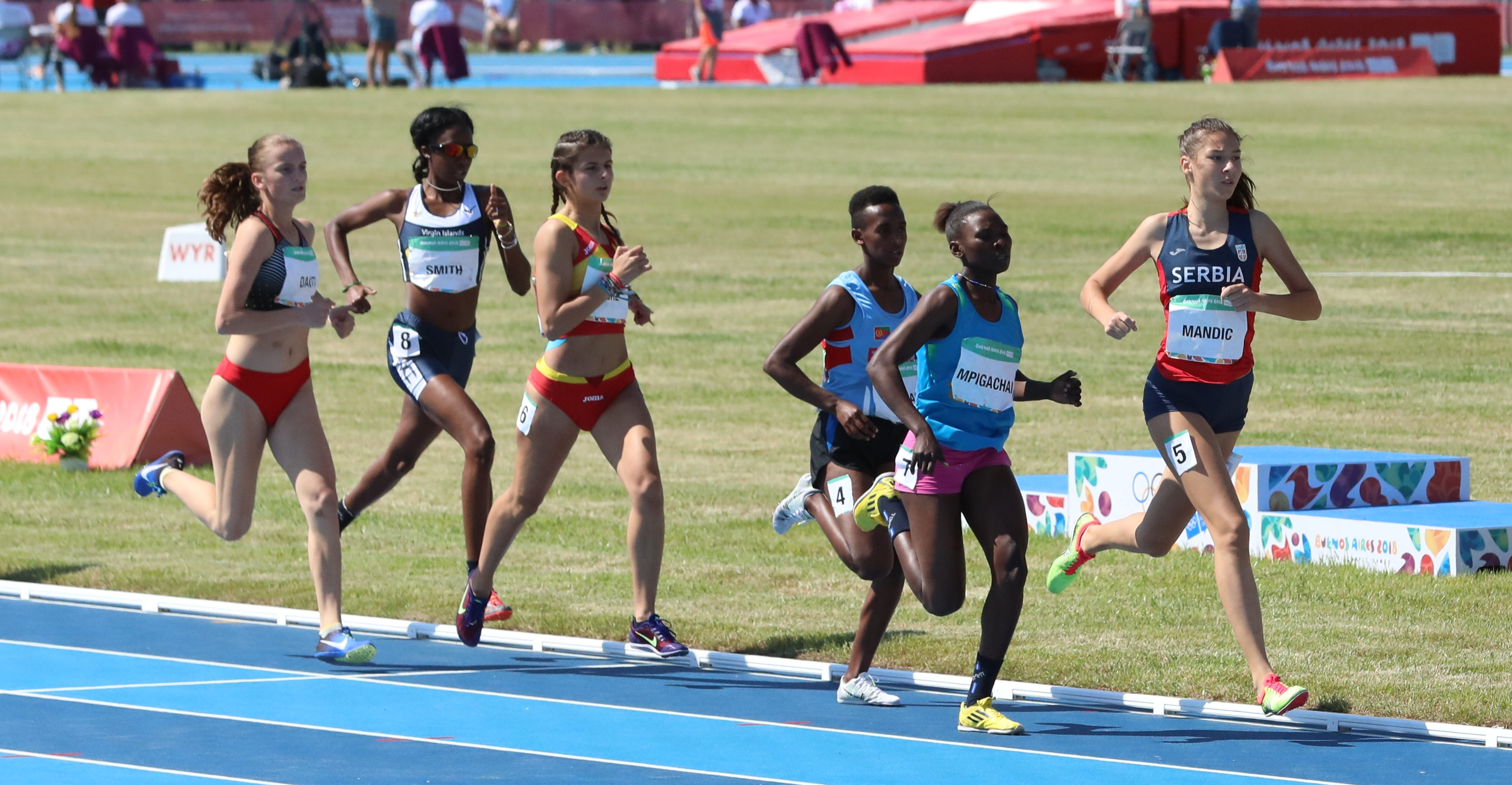
Heat 1

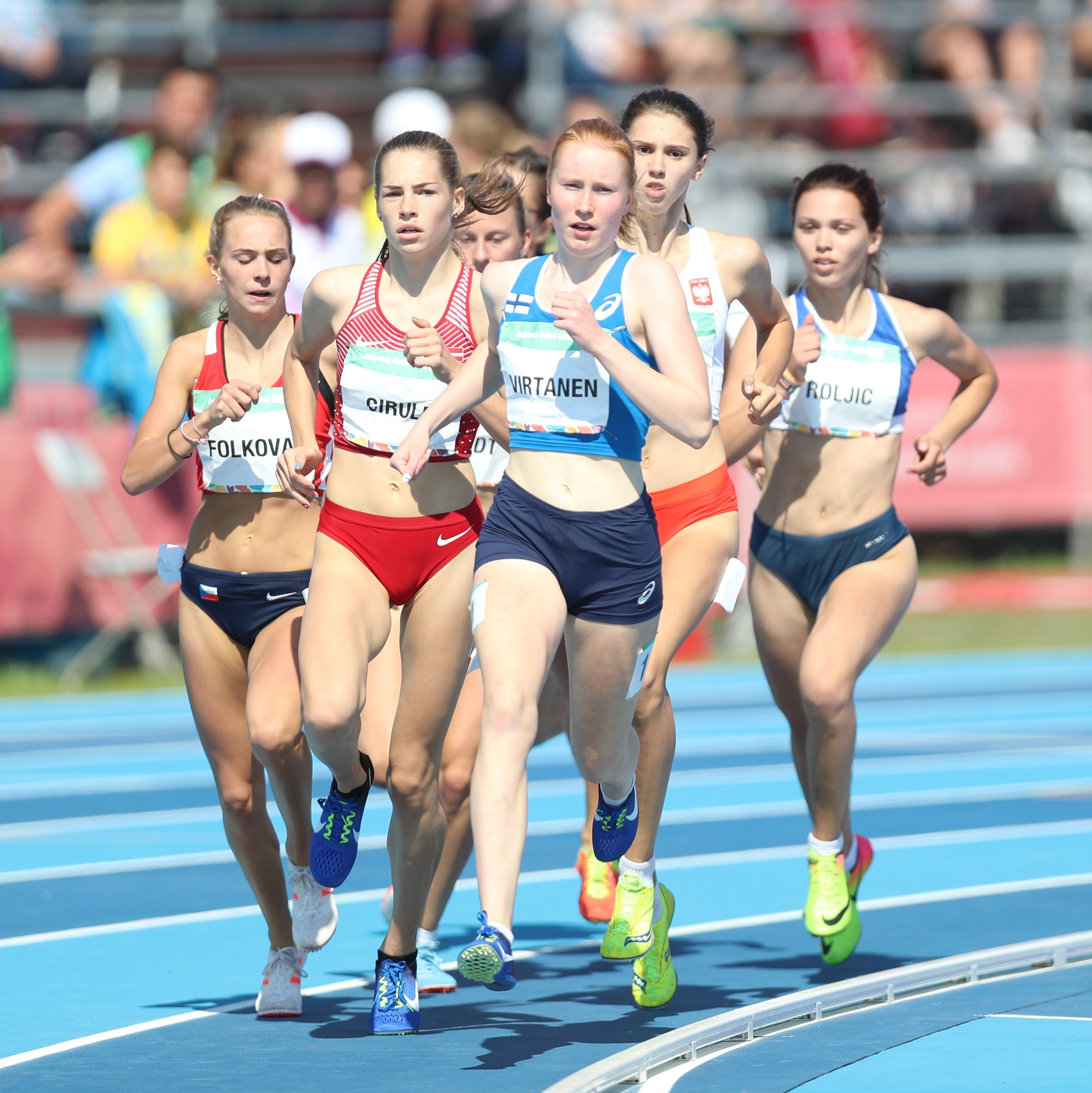
Heat 2

=== Final placing ===
Rank	Athlete	Nation	Stage 1	Stage 2	Total
1st place, gold medalist(s)	Keely Small	Australia	2:05.68	2:04.76	4:10.44
2nd place, silver medalist(s)	Athing Mu	United States	2:08.01	2:05.23	4:13.24
3rd place, bronze medalist(s)	Hirut Meshesha	Ethiopia	2:08.35	2:06.25	4:14.60
4	Sophia Volkmer	Germany	2:06.92	2:09.53	4:16.45
5	Angela Ndungwa Munguti	Kenya	2:07.34	2:11.06	4:18.40
6	Svitlana Zhulzhyk	Ukraine	2:09.73	2:10.21	4:19.94
7	Maki Ueda	Japan	2:09.91	2:10.06	4:19.97
8	Patricija Cīrule	Latvia	2:10.80	2:10.08	4:20.88
9	Denisa Folková	Czech Republic	2:11.97	2:10.88	4:22.85
10	Liudmila Rudzko	Belarus	2:12.65	2:12.23	4:24.88
11	Alicja Stój	Poland	2:14.80	2:11.52	4:26.32
12	Eleni Ioannidou	Greece	2:14.43	2:14.22	4:28.65
13	Fanny Arendt	Luxembourg	2:16.30	2:13.64	4:29.94
14	Alisa Virtanen	Finland	2:16.82	2:17.50	4:34.32
15	Regina Deogratius Mpigachai	Tanzania	2:21.29	2:13.33	4:34.62
16	Relaksa Dauti	Albania	2:16.98	2:18.09	4:35.07
17	Lucía Sicre	Spain	2:17.70	2:17.96	4:35.66
18	Sebah Amar	Eritrea	2:19.18	2:16.76	4:35.94
19	Aleksandra Roljić	Bosnia and Herzegovina	2:16.43	2:20.01	4:36.44
20	Nikolina Mandić	Serbia	2:20.35	2:19.43	4:39.78
21	Mikaela Smith	Virgin Islands	2:23.92	2:19.88	4:43.80
22	Nada Ghrouf	Palestine	2:39.11	2:34.69	5:13.80
23	Amal Kowa	Sudan	2:49.50	2:49.13	5:38.63
	Prudence Sekgodiso	South Africa	2:08.53	DQ	
	Nais Racasan	France	2:11.30	DNS	
	Zita Arusha Vincent	Saint Vincent and the Grenadines	DNF	DNS	
