= Zimbabwe at the 2018 Summer Youth Olympics =

- IOC code: ZIM
- NOC: Zimbabwe Olympic Committee
- Website: http://zoc.co.zw/

in Buenos Aires, Argentina 6 – 18 October 2018
- Competitors: 15 in 6 sports
- Medals: Gold 0 Silver 0 Bronze 0 Total 0

Summer Youth Olympics appearances
- 2010; 2014; 2018; 2026

Zimbabwe participated at the 2018 Summer Youth Olympics in Buenos Aires, Argentina from 6 October to 18 October 2018.

== Athletics ==
Athlete	Event	Stage 1		Cross Country		Total	
Athlete	Event	Time	Rank	Time	Rank	Total	Rank
Privillege Chikara	Girls' 1500m	4:49.18	15	14:15	11	26	14

== Equestrian ==
Zimbabwe qualified a rider based on its ranking in the FEI World Jumping Challenge Rankings.

- Individual Jumping - 1 athlete

Athlete	Horse	Event	Round 1		Round 2			Total		Jump off		
Athlete	Horse	Event	Penalties	Rank	Penalties	Total	Rank	Penalties	Rank	Penalties	Total	Rank
Brianagh Lindsay Clark	El Roblecito Malaika	Individual Jumping	4	2	4	4	18	8	18	did not advance		
Africa; Ahmed Nasser Elnaggar (EGY); Brianagh Lindsay Clark (ZIM); Anna Bunty Howard (ZAM); Hannah Ivy Garton (RSA); Margaux Koenig (MRI)	Jos Africa De Parco; El Roblecito Malaika; Call Girl Z Jos Cassius; B M Urlefe	Team Jumping	4 # 1; 0; 8 # 0	1	4 # 0; 0; 4 # 0	0	1	—N/a				3rd place, bronze medalist(s)

== Field hockey ==
=== Girls' tournament ===
Preliminary round

Pos	Team	Pld	W	D	L	GF	GA	GD	Pts	Qualification
1	China	5	5	0	0	29	1	+28	15	Quarterfinals
2	Australia	5	2	1	2	23	8	+15	7	Quarterfinals
3	Poland	5	2	1	2	4	14	−10	7	Quarterfinals
4	Namibia	5	1	2	2	9	17	−8	5	Quarterfinals
5	Zimbabwe	5	1	1	3	6	23	−17	4	9th place game
6	Mexico	5	0	3	2	5	13	−8	3	11th place game

Source: FIH
Rules for classification: 1) Points; 2) Goal difference; 3) Goals scored; 4) Head-to-head result.

7 October 2018
15:30

Australia	10–0	Zimbabwe
Lawton 2'; Schonell 5', 11', 12', 19'; Mathison 7'; Sertorio 13'; Young 14'; Duncan 17'; Smith 18'	Report

Umpires:
Gemma Calderon (ESP)
Ayo Zainuddin (MAS)

8 October 2018
12:30

Zimbabwe	1–2	Poland
A. Terblanche 4'	Report	Mazur 5'; Balcerzak 6'

Umpires:
Cynthia Clement (GHA)
Victoria Pazos (PAR)

9 October 2018
14:00

Zimbabwe	0–7	China
	Report	Cai 3', 10', 15'; Yu 7'; Ma 16', 17'; Zhang 17'

Umpires:
Lizé Strydom (RSA)
Ayu Zainuddin (MAS)

10 October 2018
09:30

Mexico	1–2	Zimbabwe
Ramirez 19'	Report	A. Terblanche 1'; N. Terblanche 9'

Umpires:
Cynthia Clement (GHA)
Margaux Brand (CAN)

11 October 2018
17:00

Namibia	3–3	Zimbabwe
Myburgh 4'; Schimming 15'; Cormack 15'	Report	A. Terblanche 9', 10'; Herbst 16'

Umpires:
Victoria Pazos (PAR)
Sophie Bockelmann (GER)

Ninth and tenth place

13 October 2018
13:00

Uruguay	2–0	Zimbabwe
Oliveros 8'; Suarez 13'	Report

Umpires:
Ayu Zainuddin (MAS)
Margaux Brand (CAN)

== Judo ==
Individual

Athlete	Event	Round of 16	Quarterfinals	Semifinals	Rep 1	Rep 2	Rep 3	Final / BM	
Athlete	Event	Opposition Result	Opposition Result	Opposition Result	Opposition Result	Opposition Result	Opposition Result	Opposition Result	Rank
Christi-Rose Pretorius	Girls' 78 kg	Ester Svobodová (CZE); L 00s1-10	did not advance		Shakhida Narmukhamedova (KGZ); W 10-00s1	Edith Ortiz (ECU); L 00-11	did not advance		

Team

Athletes	Event	Round of 16	Quarterfinals	Semifinals	Final	
Athletes	Event	Opposition Result	Opposition Result	Opposition Result	Opposition Result	Rank
Team Athens; Mireille Andriamifehy (MAD); Martin Bezděk (CZE); Juan Montealegre (COL); Javier Peña Insausti (ESP); Christi-Rose (ZIM); Tababi Devi Thangjam (IND); Marin Visser (NED); Anwar Zrhari (MAR)	Mixed team	Bye	Team Los Angeles (MIX); W 5–3	Team Rio de Janeiro (MIX); W 5–3	Team Beijing (MIX); L 4–5	2nd place, silver medalist(s)

== Swimming ==
Athlete	Event	Heat		Semifinal		Final	
Athlete	Event	Time	Rank	Time	Rank	Time	Rank
Liam Raymond Davis	Boys' 200m Breaststroke	2:21.59	20	—N/a		did not advance	
