= Melese Nberet =

Ethiopian middle-distance runner

Personal information
- Nationality: Ethiopian
- Born: 29 January 2001 (age 25)

Sport
- Sport: Athletics
- Events: 800 m, 1500 m

Achievements and titles
- Personal bests: 800 m: 1:45.05 (Chorzów 2021); 1500 m: 3:31.82 (Monaco 2021)
Medal record
Athletics
Representing Ethiopia
Summer Youth Olympics
Bronze medal – third place	2018 Buenos Aires	1500 m
IAAF World U18 Championships
Gold medal – first place	2017 Nairobi	800 m

Melese Nberet (born 29 January 2001) is an Ethiopian middle-distance runner. He competed in the 800 metres at the 2020 Summer Olympics, where he was eliminated in round 1, running a time of 1:47.80.
