= Keely Small =

Australian middle-distance runner

Personal information
- Born: 9 June 2001 (age 25)

Sport
- Country: Australia
- Sport: Track and field
- Event: 800 metres
Medal record
Women's middle-distance running
Representing Australia
Summer Youth Olympics
Gold medal – first place	2018 Buenos Aires	800 m
Pacific Games
Gold medal – first place	2019 Samoa	800 m

Keely Small (born 9 June 2001) is an Australian middle-distance runner. She won the gold medal in the women's 800 metres event at the 2018 Summer Youth Olympics and at the 2019 Pacific Games.

== Career ==
Small competed in the women's 800 metres event at the 2018 Commonwealth Games held in Gold Coast, Australia. In this event she did not advance to compete in the final. Later that year, she won the gold medal in the girls' 800 metres event at the 2018 Summer Youth Olympics held in Buenos Aires, Argentina. Small was also her country's flagbearer during the opening ceremony of the 2018 Summer Youth Olympics.

In 2019, at the Pacific Games held in Samoa, she won the gold medal in the women's 800 metres event.

== Personal life ==
Alpine skier Greta Small is her cousin. Greta carried the Australian flag during the opening ceremony of the 2012 Winter Youth Olympics held in Innsbruck, Austria.
