= Etson Barros =

Portuguese runner (born 2001)

Personal information
- Full name: Etson Mendes Barros
- Nationality: Portuguese
- Born: 16 March 2001 (age 25) Cabo Verde (Cape Verde)

Sport
- Country: Portugal
- Sport: Athletics
- Event: 3000 metres steeplechase
- Club: SL Benfica
- Coached by: Paulo Murta

Achievements and titles
- Personal best: 3000m s'chase: 8:12.96 (Portugal) NR
Medal record
Men's athletics
Representing Portugal
European Athletics U23 Championships
Silver medal – second place	2023 Espoo	3000m s'chase
Silver medal – second place	2021 Tallinn	3000m s'chase
European Athletics U20 Championships
Bronze medal – third place	2019 Borås	3000m s'chase
European Athletics U18 Championships
Bronze medal – third place	2018 Győr	2000m s'chase
European Youth Olympic Festival
Gold medal – first place	2017 Győr	2000m s'chase

Etson Barros (born 16 March 2001 in Cabo Verde) is a Portuguese athlete specialized in the 3000 metres steeplechase events.

He is Portugal's record holder in the 3000 metres steeplechase event.

In April 2026, the athlete was involved in a traffic accident and was placed in an induced coma, under observation at Faro Hospital, in Portugal.
