= Jaylah Hancock-Cameron =

Australian middle-distance runner

Personal information
- Born: 28 May 2002 (age 24)

Sport
- Sport: Athletics
- Event: Middle-distance running

Achievements and titles
- Personal bests: 800m: 2:00.53 (2026); 1500m: 4:06.92 (2026); Mile: 4:31.37 (2025); 3000m: 8:58.97 (2024); 5000m: 16:07.65 (2025); Road; Mile 4:26.40 (2026) AR; 10k: 33:34 (2025)
Medal record
Women's athletics
Representing Australia
Oceania Championships
Bronze medal – third place	2022 Mackay	1500 m
Olympic Youth Games
Silver medal – second place	2018 Buenos Aires	1500 m

Jaylah Hancock-Cameron (born 28 May 2002) is an Australian middle-distance runner. She is a two-time Australian champion in the mile run. In winning in 2026, she set a new Australian national and Oceania area record time.

== Biography ==
From Broulee, New South Wales, Hancock-Cameron attended Moruya High School and trained as a junior at Bankstown Sports Club and worked with Anda’e Kalemusic as coach. She represented Australia at the 2018 Youth Olympics in Buenos Aires and won the age-group Australian Cross-Country Championships in 2019. That year, Hancock-Cameron ran 4.16.04 for the 1500 metres. She won the Australian U20 title over that distance in April 2021, and improved her personal best with a time of 4:12:4 to move to sixth on the all-time Australian U20 list on 5 June 2021, at the Oceania invitational on the Gold Coast, the substitute event organised for the junior Australian team who were selected to compete at the World U20 Championships but to which Australia ultimately did not send a team due to the COVID-19 pandemic.

In June 2022, she won the bronze medal in the 1500 m at the 2022 Oceania Athletics Championships in Mackay, finishing behind Claudia Hollingsworth and Abbey Caldwell in an Australian sweep of the medals.

In March 2023, she won the New South Wales Championships over 1500 metres in Sydney. That year, she set a new personal best for the 800 metres and won in England over that distance in 2:02.78 at the British Milers Club in Manchester on 27 June 2023.

Hancock-Cameron won the Australian road mile championships in Ballarat in April 2025, finishing in 4:38.20 ahead of Lauren Ryan and Izzy Thornton-Bott.

In April 2026, she placed fourth over 800 metres and fifth over 1500 metres at the Australian Championships. Later that month, she set a new Australian national and Oceania area record in retaining her national title in the road mile, running 4:26.4 at the Australian Road Mile Championships in Ballarat, surpassing the previous record of 4:32.45 held by Jessica Hull. She was selected as part of the Australian team to compete at the 2026 Oceania Athletics Championships over both 800 metres and 1500 metres in Darwin, Northern Territory. On 7 June, she placed fourth over 800 metres at the 2026 Bauhausgalan in Stockholm.
