= Abrham Sime =

Ethiopian athlete

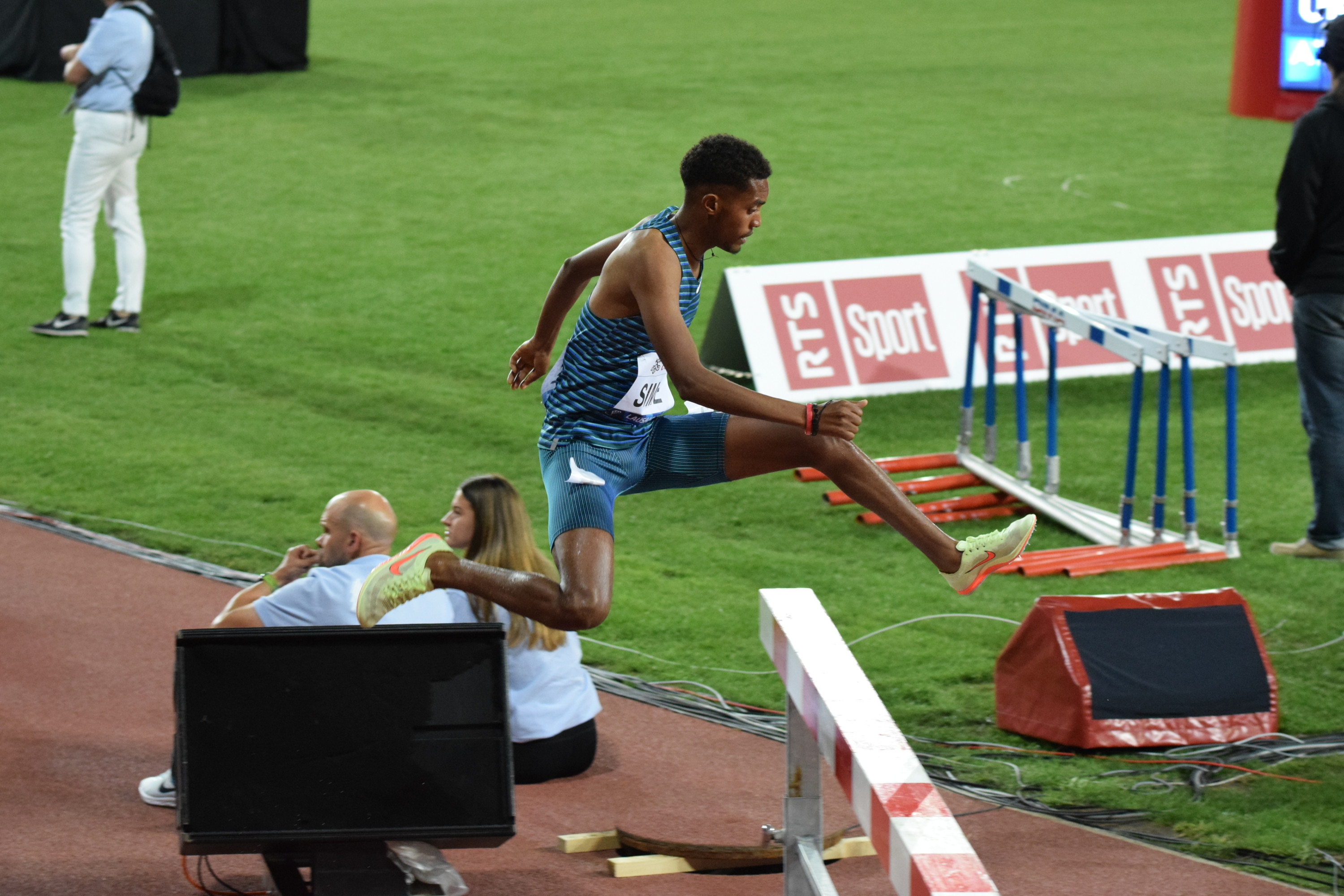
- Sime in 2022

Personal information
- Born: 7 November 2001 (age 24)

Sport
- Sport: Athletics
- Event: 3000 metres steeplechase

Achievements and titles
- Personal best: 3000m Steeplechase: 8:02.36 (Paris 2024)
Medal record
Youth Olympic Games
Gold medal – first place	2018 Buenos Aires	2000 m steeplechase

Abrham Sime (born 7 November 2001) is an Ethiopian steeplechase runner. He competed in the 3000 metres steeplechase at the 2023 World Athletics Championships.

== Biography ==
Sime won the men's 2000m steeplechase at the 2018 Youth Olympic Games in Buenos Aires, Argentina.

In 2021, Sime was second in the 3000m steeplechase Ethiopian Olympic trials in behind Bikila Tadese Takele with both men running personal bests, Sime ran 8:12:11 to secure the qualification time for the delayed 2020 Tokyo Olympics and was later chosen in the Ethiopian squad. However, Sime did not compete.

He ran a new personal best of 8:10.73 at the Paris Diamond League event in June 2023, in the same race that saw his compatriot Lamecha Girma broke the world record in the men's 3,000 metres steeplechase. He ran a new personal best in July 2023 at the Diamond League event in Monaco, running 8:10.56 to finish third behind winner Simon Koech.

He competed in the 3000 metres steeplechase at the 2023 World Athletics Championships in Budapest in August 2023. In 2024, Sime set a new PB of 8:02.36 at the Meeting de Paris, holding off the fast-finishing Amos Serem to win. He competed in the 3000 metres steeplechase at the 2025 Xiamen Diamond League event in China, in April 2025. The following weekend, he secured a victory in the 3000m steeplechase at the 2025 Shanghai Diamond League, running a time of 8:07.92 to win from Kenya's Edmund Serem.

In July 2025, he was provisionally named as a reserve for the Ethiopian team for the 3000 metres steeplechase at the 2025 World Athletics Championships in Tokyo, Japan. He placed eighth in the 3000 metres steeplechase at the Diamond League Final in Zurich on 28 August.

Sime placed second in the 3000 m steeplechase at the Paavo Nurmi Games in Finland on 3 June, running 8:14.09, inside his own meeting record set at the Games in 2022. On 19 June, he placed fifth at the 2026 Doha Diamond League and placed seventh on 28 June at the 2026 Meeting de Paris.
