= Abersh Minsewo =

Ethiopian long-distance runner

Abersh Minsewo (born 2001) is an Ethiopian distance runner. She won the women's edition of the 2024 Mumbai Marathon, which was her marathon debut. She also won gold in the 3000 metres race at the 2017 IAAF World U18 Championships with a finish time of nine minutes and 24.62 seconds.
