= Burundi at the 2018 Summer Youth Olympics =

- IOC code: BDI
- NOC: Comité National Olympique du Burundi

in Buenos Aires, Argentina 6 – 18 October 2018
- Competitors: 5 in 3 sports
- Medals Ranked 61st: Gold 1 Silver 0 Bronze 0 Total 1

Summer Youth Olympics appearances
- 2010; 2014; 2018

Burundi competed at the 2018 Summer Youth Olympics in Buenos Aires, Argentina from 6 October to 18 October 2018.

== Medalists ==
Medals awarded to participants of mixed-NOC teams are represented in italics. These medals are not counted towards the individual NOC medal tally.

Medal	Name	Sport	Event	Date
Gold	Jean de Dieu Butoyi	Athletics	Boys' 1500 m	15 October
Bronze	Fleury Nihozeko	Judo	Mixed team	10 October

== Athletics ==
Burundi qualified 3 competitors in athletics for the games.

Athlete	Event	Stage 1		Stage 2		Final placing
Athlete	Event	Result	Rank	Result	Rank	Final placing
Jean de Dieu Butoyi	1500 m	3:54.32	1 Q	11:31	4	1st place, gold medalist(s)

== Judo ==
Individual

Athlete	Event	Round of 16	Quarterfinals	Semifinals	Rep 1	Rep 2	Rep 3	Final / BM	
Athlete	Event	Opposition Result	Opposition Result	Opposition Result	Opposition Result	Opposition Result	Opposition Result	Opposition Result	Rank
Fleury Nihozeko	Boys' 100 kg	Shojaei (IRI); L 00–10	did not advance		Bye	Alin Bagrin (MDA); L 00–10	did not advance		

Team

Athletes	Event	Round of 16	Quarterfinals	Semifinals	Final	
Athletes	Event	Opposition Result	Opposition Result	Opposition Result	Opposition Result	Rank
Team Rio de Janeiro; Milana Charygulyyeva (TKM); Yassamine Djellab (ALG); Metka Lobnik (SLO); Erza Muminoviq (KOS); Abrek Naguchev (RUS); Fleury Nihozeko (BDI); Jamshed Sulaimoni (TJK); Sultan Zhenishbekov (KGZ)	Mixed team	Team Sydney (MIX); W 4–3	Team Atlanta (MIX); W 5–4	Team Athens (MIX); L 3–5	did not advance	3rd place, bronze medalist(s)

== Tennis ==
Singles

Athlete	Event	Round of 32	Round of 16	Quarterfinals	Semifinals	Final / BM	
Athlete	Event	Opposition Score	Opposition Score	Opposition Score	Opposition Score	Opposition Score	Rank
Sada Nahimana	Girls' singles	MG Rivera Corado (GUA); W (6-2, 6-1)	C Burel (FRA); L (4-6, 2-6)	did not advance			

Doubles

Athletes	Event	Round of 32	Round of 16	Quarterfinals	Semifinals	Final / BM	
Athletes	Event	Opposition Score	Opposition Score	Opposition Score	Opposition Score	Opposition Score	Rank
S Nahimana (BDI); MG Rivera Corado (GUA)	Girls' doubles	ML Carlé (ARG); Osorio (COL); L (1-6, 3-6)	did not advance				
S Nahimana (BDI); P Henning (RSA)	Mixed doubles	T Naklo (THA); A Dawani (BHR); W 6-0, 6–1	K Juvan (SLO); M Miladinović (SRB); L 2-6, 6–4, 8–10	did not advance			
