= Cycling at the 2018 Summer Youth Olympics – Girls' combined team =

Girls' combined team at the III Summer Youth Olympic Games
- Venue: Parque Tres de Febrero
- Dates: 13–17 October
- Competitors: 38 from 19 nations

Medalists
1st place, gold medalist(s)		Sofie Heby Pedersen; Mie Saabye	Denmark
2nd place, silver medalist(s)		Laura Stigger; Hannah Streicher	Austria
3rd place, bronze medalist(s)		Virág Buzsáki; Kata Blanka Vas	Hungary

These are the results for the girls' combined team event at the 2018 Summer Youth Olympics.

== Results ==
=== Team time trial ===
Rank	Nation	Time	Points
1	Denmark	9:34.11	100
2	Poland	9:46.59	80
3	Italy	9:47.67	65
4	Hungary	9:50.04	50
5	Austria	9:52.06	40
6	Russia	9:52.87	30
7	New Zealand	9:53.99	25
8	Great Britain	9:55.77	20
9	Kazakhstan	10:00.49	15
10	Switzerland	10:03.19	10
11	Argentina	10:06.11	8
12	China	10:11.13	6
13	Ukraine	10:12.32	4
14	Eritrea	10:21.38	3
15	Colombia	10:26.49	2
16	Mexico	10:27.56	1
17	Ethiopia	10:31.40	0
18	Luxembourg	10:31.60	0
19	Egypt	11:28.24	0

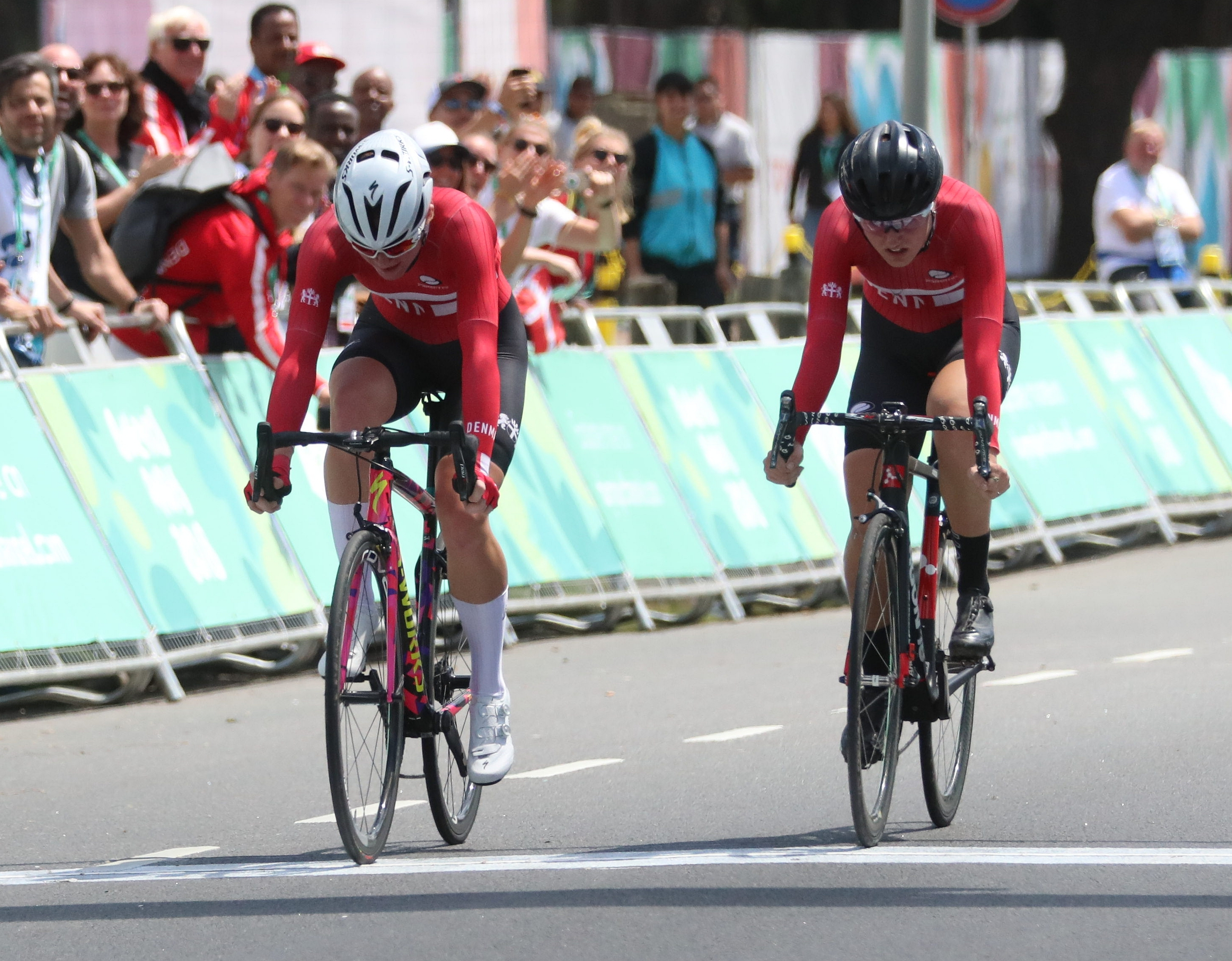
Team Denmark, first place

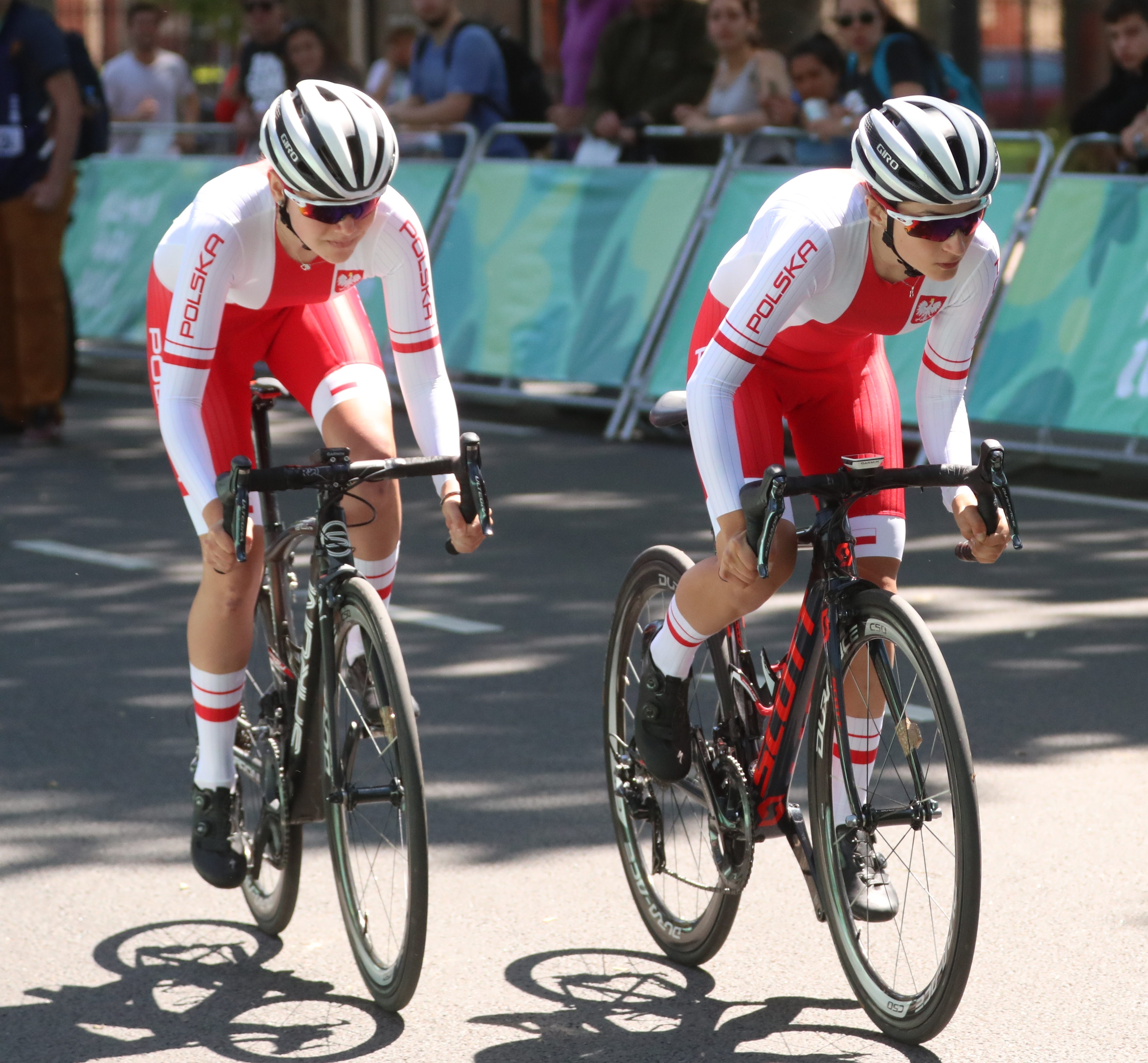
Team Poland, second place

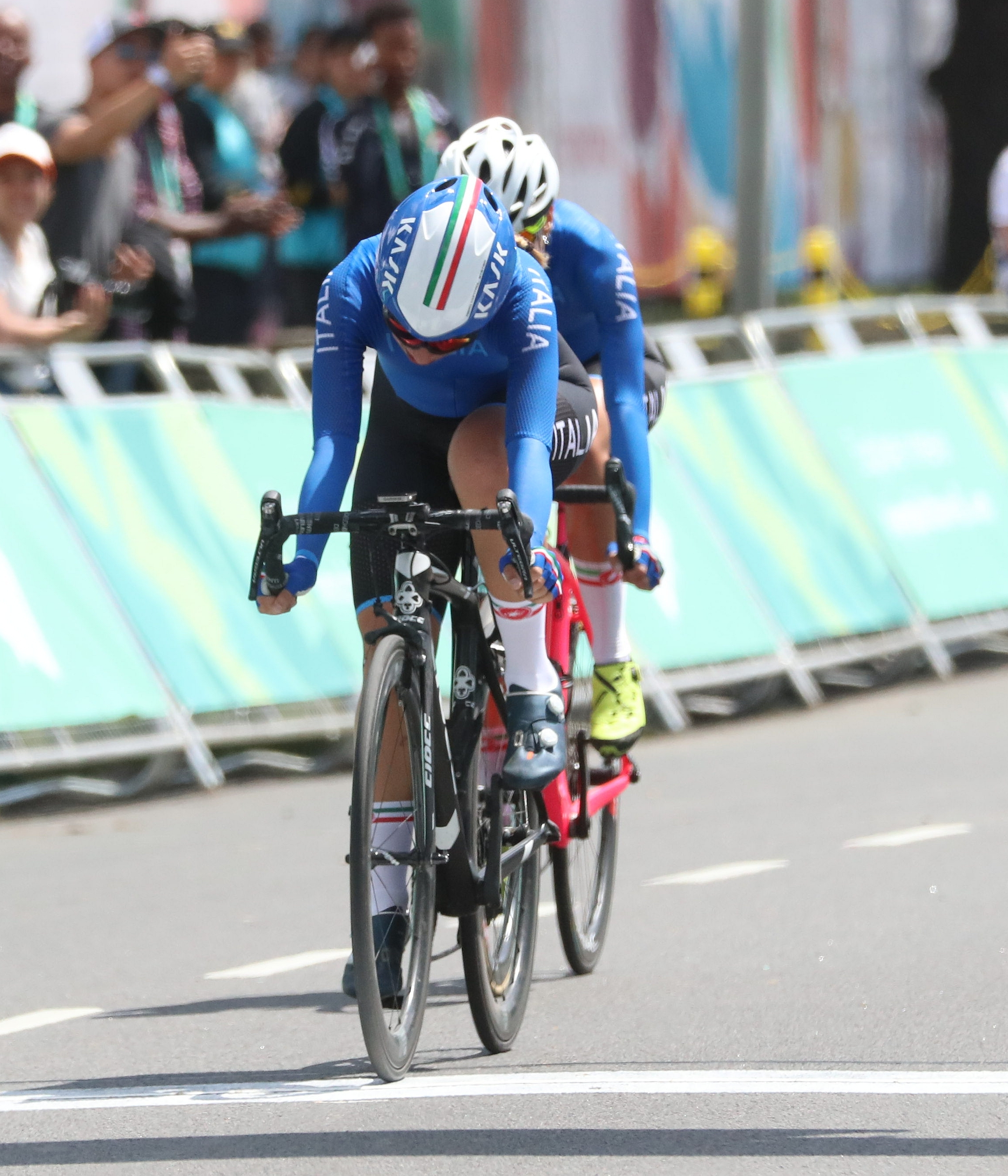
Team Italy, third place

=== Road race ===
Rank	Athlete	Nation	Time	Points
1	Svetlana Pachshenko	Kazakhstan	1:41:20	100
2	Phoebe Young	New Zealand	1:41:21	80
3	Laura Stigger	Austria	1:42:19	65
4	Aigul Gareeva	Russia	1:42:19	50
5	Kata Blanka Vas	Hungary	1:42:19	40
6	Sofia Collinelli	Italy	1:42:19	30
7	Marina Kurnossova	Kazakhstan	1:42:19	25
8	Katia Elizabeth Martínez Miñarro	Mexico	1:42:19	20
9	Wiktoria Kierat	Poland	1:42:19	15
10	Sofie Heby Pedersen	Denmark	1:42:19	10
11	Desiet Kidane	Eritrea	1:42:19	8
12	Marta Jaskulska	Poland	1:42:19	6
13	Mie Saabye	Denmark	1:42:19	4
14	Sohaila Youssef	Egypt	1:42:19	3
15	Hannah Streicher	Austria	1:42:19	2
16	Zayid Hailu	Ethiopia	1:42:19	1
17	Valentina Muñoz	Argentina	1:42:19	
18	Virág Buzsáki	Hungary	1:42:19	
19	Kasahun Tsadkan	Ethiopia	1:42:19	
20	Harriet Harnden	Great Britain	1:42:19	
21	Erika Botero	Colombia	1:42:19	
22	Danait Tsegay	Eritrea	1:42:19	
23	Camila Samso	Argentina	1:42:19	
24	Oleksandra Logvinyuk	Ukraine	1:42:19	
25	Fatima Anahi Hijar Marin	Mexico	1:42:19	
26	Olha Kulynych	Ukraine	1:42:19	
27	Ronja Blöchlinger	Switzerland	1:42:24	
28	Anna McGorum	Great Britain	1:42:29	
29	Laetitia Maus	Luxembourg	1:42:39	
30	Noelle Buri	Switzerland	1:42:47	
31	Darya Alexeeva	Russia	1:42:54	
32	Angie Lara	Colombia	1:42:59	
33	Nina Berton	Luxembourg	1:43:05	
34	Wang Yawei	China	1:43:16	
35	Giada Specia	Italy	1:43:16	
36	Sammie Maxwell	New Zealand	1:45:24	
	Tang Xin	China	DNF	
	Salma Salah Eldin	Egypt	DNF	

=== Cross-country eliminator ===
==== Qualification ====
Rank	Athlete	Nation	Time	Notes
1	Mie Saabye	Denmark	1:50.635	Q
2	Laura Stigger	Austria	1:51.125	Q
3	Sofie Heby Pedersen	Denmark	1:53.167	Q
4	Harriet Harnden	Great Britain	1:53.234	Q
5	Virág Buzsáki	Hungary	1:56.013	Q
6	Anna McGorum	Great Britain	1:57.793	Q
7	Ronja Blöchlinger	Switzerland	1:57.929	Q
8	Sammie Maxwell	New Zealand	1:58.954	Q
9	Angie Lara	Colombia	2:00.253	Q
10	Darya Alexeeva	Russia	2:00.329	Q
11	Phoebe Young	New Zealand	2:00.411	Q
12	Noelle Buri	Switzerland	2:00.505	Q
13	Giada Specia	Italy	2:00.521	Q
14	Fatima Anahi Hijar Marin	Mexico	2:01.051	Q
15	Aigul Gareeva	Russia	2:01.559	Q
16	Camila Samso	Argentina	2:01.694	Q
17	Hannah Streicher	Austria	2:01.875	Q
18	Nina Berton	Luxembourg	2:02.466	Q
19	Erika Botero	Colombia	2:03.929	Q
20	Svetlana Pachshenko	Kazakhstan	2:05.235	Q
21	Valentina Muñoz	Argentina	2:05.988	Q
22	Olha Kulynych	Ukraine	2:06.002	Q
23	Tang Xin	China	2:07.618	Q
24	Katia Elizabeth Martínez Miñarro	Mexico	2:08.222	Q
25	Laetitia Maus	Luxembourg	2:08.337	Q
26	Oleksandra Logvinyuk	Ukraine	2:08.803	Q
27	Wiktoria Kierat	Poland	2:09.155	Q
28	Marina Kurnossova	Kazakhstan	2:09.961	Q
29	Wang Yawei	China	2:13.421	Q
30	Sofia Collinelli	Italy	2:14.558	Q
31	Zayid Hailu	Ethiopia	2:16.938	Q
32	Sohaila Youssef	Egypt	2:22.759	Q
33	Kasahun Tsadkan	Ethiopia	2:24.895	
34	Marta Jaskulska	Poland	2:44.614	
35	Desiet Kidane	Eritrea	3:31.739	
36	Danait Tsegay	Eritrea	3:34.054	
37	Salma Salah Eldin	Egypt	3:46.992	
	Kata Blanka Vas	Hungary	DNF	

==== 1/8 finals ====
Heat 1

Rank	Seed	Name	Country	Notes
1	1	Mie Saabye	Denmark	Q
2	16	Camila Samso	Argentina	Q
3	17	Hannah Streicher	Austria	
4	32	Sohaila Youssef	Egypt	

Heat 2

Rank	Seed	Name	Country	Notes
1	9	Angie Lara	Colombia	Q
2	8	Sammie Maxwell	New Zealand	Q
3	25	Laetitia Maus	Luxembourg	
4	24	Katia Elizabeth Martínez Miñarro	Mexico	

Heat 3

Rank	Seed	Name	Country	Notes
1	4	Harriet Harnden	Great Britain	Q
2	20	Svetlana Pachshenko	Kazakhstan	Q
3	13	Giada Specia	Italy	
4	29	Wang Yawei	China	

Heat 4

Rank	Seed	Name	Country	Notes
1	12	Noelle Buri	Switzerland	Q
2	5	Virág Buzsáki	Hungary	Q
3	21	Valentina Muñoz	Argentina	
4	28	Marina Kurnossova	Kazakhstan	

Heat 5

Rank	Seed	Name	Country	Notes
1	2	Laura Stigger	Austria	Q
2	15	Aigul Gareeva	Russia	Q
3	18	Nina Berton	Luxembourg	
4	31	Zayid Hailu	Ethiopia	

Heat 6

Rank	Seed	Name	Country	Notes
1	10	Darya Alexeeva	Russia	Q
2	23	Tang Xin	China	Q
3	26	Oleksandra Logvinyuk	Ukraine	
4	7	Ronja Blöchlinger	Switzerland	

Heat 7

Rank	Seed	Name	Country	Notes
1	3	Sofie Heby Pedersen	Denmark	Q
2	14	Fatima Anahi Hijar Marin	Mexico	Q
3	19	Erika Botero	Colombia	
4	30	Sofia Collinelli	Italy	

Heat 8

Rank	Seed	Name	Country	Notes
1	6	Anna McGorum	Great Britain	Q
2	11	Phoebe Young	New Zealand	Q
3	22	Olha Kulynych	Ukraine	
4	27	Wiktoria Kierat	Poland	

==== Quarterfinals ====
Heat 1

Rank	Seed	Name	Country	Notes	Points
1	1	Mie Saabye	Denmark	Q	
2	9	Angie Lara	Colombia	Q	
3	8	Sammie Maxwell	New Zealand		15
4	16	Camila Samso	Argentina		3

Heat 2

Rank	Seed	Name	Country	Notes	Points
1	5	Virág Buzsáki	Hungary	Q	
2	4	Harriet Harnden	Great Britain	Q	
3	12	Noelle Buri	Switzerland		10
4	20	Svetlana Pachshenko	Kazakhstan		2

Heat 3

Rank	Seed	Name	Country	Notes	Points
1	2	Laura Stigger	Austria	Q	
2	10	Darya Alexeeva	Russia	Q	
3	15	Aigul Gareeva	Russia		6
4	23	Tang Xin	China		1

Heat 4

Rank	Seed	Name	Country	Notes	Points
1	3	Sofie Heby Pedersen	Denmark	Q	
2	6	Anna McGorum	Great Britain	Q	
3	14	Fatima Anahi Hijar Marin	Mexico		8
4	11	Phoebe Young	New Zealand		4

==== Semifinals ====
Heat 1

Rank	Seed	Name	Country	Notes
1	1	Mie Saabye	Denmark	BF
2	4	Harriet Harnden	Great Britain	BF
3	5	Virág Buzsáki	Hungary	SF
4	9	Angie Lara	Colombia	SF

Heat 2

Rank	Seed	Name	Country	Notes
1	2	Laura Stigger	Austria	BF
2	3	Sofie Heby Pedersen	Denmark	BF
3	10	Darya Alexeeva	Russia	SF
4	6	Anna McGorum	Great Britain	SF

==== Finals ====
Small final

Rank	Seed	Name	Country	Notes	Points
1	5	Virág Buzsáki	Hungary		40
2	10	Darya Alexeeva	Russia		30
3	6	Anna McGorum	Great Britain		25
4	9	Angie Lara	Colombia		20

Big final

Rank	Seed	Name	Country	Notes	Points
1	2	Laura Stigger	Austria		100
2	1	Mie Saabye	Denmark		80
3	3	Sofie Heby Pedersen	Denmark		65
4	4	Harriet Harnden	Great Britain		50

=== Cross-country short circuit ===
==== Qualification ====
===== Heat 1 =====
Rank	Athlete	Nation	Time	Notes
1	Laura Stigger	Austria	15:38	Q
2	Sofie Heby Pedersen	Denmark	15:39	Q
3	Harriet Harnden	Great Britain	15:39	Q
4	Ronja Blöchlinger	Switzerland	15:40	Q
5	Sofia Collinelli	Italy	15:41	Q
6	Olha Kulynych	Ukraine	15:43	Q
7	Valentina Muñoz	Argentina	15:56	Q
8	Virág Buzsáki	Hungary	15:58	Q
9	Erika Botero	Colombia	16:01	Q
10	Fatima Anahi Hijar Marin	Mexico	16:05	Q
11	Sammie Maxwell	New Zealand	16:20	
12	Nina Berton	Luxembourg	16:40	
13	Tang Xin	China	16:43	
14	Desiet Kidane	Eritrea	16:46	
15	Darya Alexeeva	Russia	16:48	
16	Zayid Hailu	Ethiopia	17:09	
17	Marina Kurnossova	Kazakhstan	17:31	
18	Salma Salah Eldin	Egypt	-2LAP	
	Marta Jaskulska	Poland	DNF	

===== Heat 2 =====
Rank	Athlete	Nation	Time	Notes
1	Mie Saabye	Denmark	15:31	Q
2	Noelle Buri	Switzerland	15:31	Q
3	Giada Specia	Italy	15:32	Q
4	Kata Blanka Vas	Hungary	15:41	Q
5	Aigul Gareeva	Russia	15:45	Q
6	Phoebe Young	New Zealand	15:46	Q
7	Anna McGorum	Great Britain	16:19	Q
8	Svetlana Pachshenko	Kazakhstan	16:37	Q
9	Hannah Streicher	Austria	16:38	Q
10	Angie Lara	Colombia	16:39	Q
11	Camila Samso	Argentina	16:39	
12	Wiktoria Kierat	Poland	17:11	
13	Wang Yawei	China	17:11	
14	Laetitia Maus	Luxembourg	17:20	
15	Katia Elizabeth Martínez Miñarro	Mexico	17:42	
16	Danait Tsegay	Eritrea	18:34	
17	Kasahun Tsadkan	Ethiopia	18:34	
18	Oleksandra Logvinyuk	Ukraine	-1LAP	
19	Sohaila Youssef	Egypt	-2LAP	

==== Final ====
Rank	Athlete	Nation	Time	Points
1	Laura Stigger	Austria	18:13	100
2	Harriet Harnden	Great Britain	18:14	80
3	Sofie Heby Pedersen	Denmark	18:15	65
4	Mie Saabye	Denmark	18:27	50
5	Olha Kulynych	Ukraine	18:36	40
6	Aigul Gareeva	Russia	18:44	30
7	Kata Blanka Vas	Hungary	18:44	25
8	Noelle Buri	Switzerland	18:44	20
9	Sofia Collinelli	Italy	18:44	15
10	Phoebe Young	New Zealand	18:46	10
11	Giada Specia	Italy	19:03	8
12	Erika Botero	Colombia	19:20	6
13	Anna McGorum	Great Britain	19:20	4
14	Valentina Muñoz	Argentina	19:21	3
15	Ronja Blöchlinger	Switzerland	19:40	2
16	Svetlana Pachshenko	Kazakhstan	19:56	1
17	Fatima Anahi Hijar Marin	Mexico	20:00	
18	Hannah Streicher	Austria	20:08	
19	Virág Buzsáki	Hungary	20:09	
20	Angie Lara	Colombia	20:13	

=== Criterium ===
Rank	Athlete	Nation	Sprint Points	Finish Order	Laps Completed	Points
1	Kata Blanka Vas	Hungary	11	8	16	100
2	Olha Kulynych	Ukraine	10	1	16	80
3	Tang Xin	China	9	4	16	65
4	Aigul Gareeva	Russia	9	3	16	50
5	Laura Stigger	Austria	8	5	16	40
6	Marta Jaskulska	Poland	6	2	16	30
7	Harriet Harnden	Great Britain	1	7	16	25
8	Sofia Collinelli	Italy	1	29	16	20
9	Desiet Kidane	Eritrea	0	6	16	15
10	Zayid Hailu	Ethiopia	0	9	16	10
11	Hannah Streicher	Austria	0	10	16	8
12	Svetlana Pachshenko	Kazakhstan	0	11	16	6
13	Noelle Buri	Switzerland	0	12	16	4
14	Katia Elizabeth Martínez Miñarro	Mexico	0	13	16	3
15	Mie Saabye	Denmark	0	14	16	2
16	Wiktoria Kierat	Poland	0	15	16	1
17	Erika Botero	Colombia	0	16	16	
18	Camila Samso	Argentina	0	17	16	
19	Wang Yawei	China	0	18	16	
20	Sofie Heby Pedersen	Denmark	0	19	16	
21	Danait Tsegay	Eritrea	0	20	16	
22	Ronja Blöchlinger	Switzerland	0	21	16	
23	Darya Alexeeva	Russia	0	22	16	
24	Anna McGorum	Great Britain	0	23	16	
25	Marina Kurnossova	Kazakhstan	0	24	16	
26	Oleksandra Logvinyuk	Ukraine	0	25	16	
27	Giada Specia	Italy	0	26	16	
28	Kasahun Tsadkan	Ethiopia	0	27	16	
29	Virág Buzsáki	Hungary	0	28	16	
30	Nina Berton	Luxembourg	0	30	16	
31	Angie Lara	Colombia	0	31	16	
	Sammie Maxwell	New Zealand	0	DNF	12	
	Phoebe Young	New Zealand	0	DNF	12	
	Valentina Muñoz	Argentina	0	DNF	7	
	Laetitia Maus	Luxembourg	0	DNF	6	
	Salma Salah Eldin	Egypt	0	DNF	5	
	Fatima Anahi Hijar Marin	Mexico	0	DNF	5	
	Sohaila Youssef	Egypt	0	DNF	2	

=== Overall team classification ===
Rank	Nation	Athlete	Team Time Trial	Road Race	Cross-country Eliminator	Cross-country Short Circuit	Criterium	Total
1st place, gold medalist(s)	Denmark	Sofie Heby Pedersen; Mie Saabye	100	14	145	115	2	376
2nd place, silver medalist(s)	Austria	Laura Stigger; Hannah Streicher	40	67	100	100	40	355
3rd place, bronze medalist(s)	Hungary	Virág Buzsáki; Kata Blanka Vas	50	40	40	25	100	255
4	Great Britain	Harriet Harnden; Anna McGorum	20		75	84	25	204
5	Russia	Darya Alexeeva; Aigul Gareeva	30	50	36	30	50	196
6	Kazakhstan	Marina Kurnossova; Svetlana Pachshenko	15	125	2	1	6	149
7	Italy	Sofia Collinelli; Giada Specia	65	30		23	20	138
8	New Zealand	Sammie Maxwell; Phoebe Young	25	80	19	10		134
9	Poland	Marta Jaskulska; Wiktoria Kierat	80	21			31	132
10	Ukraine	Olha Kulynych; Oleksandra Logvinyuk	4			40	80	124
11	China	Tang Xin; Wang Yawei	6		1		65	72
12	Switzerland	Ronja Blöchlinger; Noelle Buri	10		10	22	4	46
13	Mexico	Fatima Anahi Hijar Marin; Katia Elizabeth Martínez Miñarro	1	20	8		3	32
14	Colombia	Erika Botero; Angie Lara	2		20	6		28
15	Eritrea	Desiet Kidane; Danait Tsegay	3	8			15	26
16	Argentina	Valentina Muñoz; Camila Samso	8		3	3		14
17	Ethiopia	Zayid Hailu; Kasahun Tsadkan		1			10	11
18	Egypt	Salma Salah Eldin; Sohaila Youssef		3				3
19	Luxembourg	Nina Berton; Laetitia Maus						0
