= Ukrainians in Kazakhstan =

Ethnic minority in Kazakhstan

Казахстанські українці; Қазақстандық украиндар
- (Ukraine) (Kazakhstan)

Total population
- 387,000 (2021 census)

Languages
- Ukrainian, Kazakh and Russian

Religion
- Christianity （Eastern Orthodox、Eastern Catholic Churches）

Related ethnic groups
- Russian Kazakhs, Polish Kazakhs

Ukrainians in Kazakhstan (Kazakh: Қазақстандағы украиндар, romanized: Qazaqstandağy ukraindar; Ukrainian: Українці в Казахстані, romanized: Ukrayintsi v Kazakhstani) are an ethnic minority in Kazakhstan that according to the 1989 census numbered 896,000 people, or 5.4% of the population. Due to subsequent emigration to Russia and Ukraine, this number had declined to 796,000 by 1998 and 456,997 in the 2009 census.

Ukrainians occasionally called the lands in Northern Kazakhstan and Western Siberia as Grey Ukraine (Ukrainian: Сірий Клин, romanized: Siryy Klyn).

== History ==
Beginning in the end of the 18th century, several waves of both voluntary and involuntary Ukrainian settlers came to Kazakhstan. The first Ukrainians to arrive were exiled Haidamaks, members of paramilitary Ukrainian peasant and Cossack bands, who were sent by the Russian government to Kazakhstan after their failed uprising in 1768.

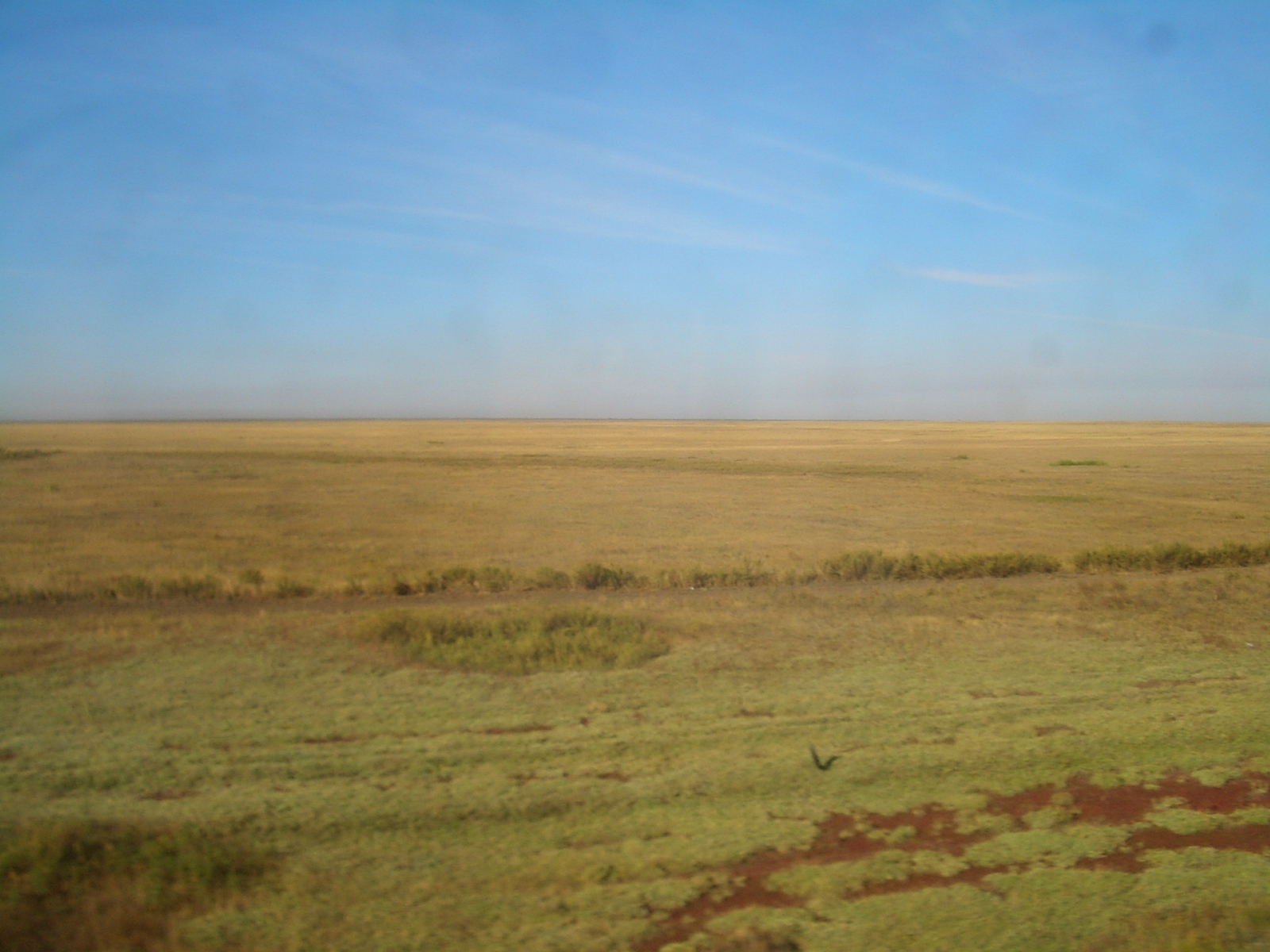
The steppes north of Astana in Akmola province, a region where many Ukrainians settled

More significant in terms of their contribution to the Ukrainian ethnic group in Kazakhstan were a large wave of settlers who beginning in the late nineteenth century arrived from almost all of the regions of Ukraine that had been part of the Russian Empire at that time. Seeking more opportunities and free land, these voluntary emigrants numbered approximately 100,000 people in Kazakhstan and adjacent regions of Russia by the turn of the century. This movement escalated significantly following the agricultural reforms of Russian Prime Minister Pyotr Stolypin in the early 20th century. Between 1897 and 1917, the proportion of the population of Kazakhstan that was of Ukrainian ethnicity increased from 1.9% to 10.5%. They tended to settle in the regions of Kazakhstan that most resembled Ukraine, in the northern part of Kazakhstan. By 1917, Ukrainians came to make up approximately 29.5% of the population of Akmola Province and 21.5% of the population of Turgai province. By 1926, according to the census, Kazakhstan was home to 860,000 Ukrainians.

In the 1930s during the Soviet process of collectivization, approximately 64,000 Ukrainian kulak (relatively wealthy peasant) families were forcibly resettled in Kazakhstan. Ethnic minorities in Kazakhstan were significantly affected by the Kazakh famine of 1930–1933 in addition to the Kazakhs. According to one estimate Ukrainians in Kazakhstan had the second highest proportional death and migration rate after the Kazakhs themselves. Between the 1926 and 1937 censuses, Ukrainian population in Kazakhstan decreased by 36% from 859,396 to 549,859 – mainly from famine and epidemics but also including emigration – while Uzbeks, Uighurs, and other ethnic minorities in Kazakhstan each lost between 12% and 30% of their populations. However other estimates state the mortality rate of Ukrainians in Kazakhstan varied between 15% to 18% actually being surpassed by Kazakh Germans who experienced a mortality rate of 20% to 25%.

The first western Ukrainians were forcibly deported to Kazakhstan from the regions of Galicia and Volhynia when the Soviet Union annexed western Ukraine in 1939-1940. They were followed by more deportees from western Ukraine, people who were accused of or having been members of the Organization of Ukrainian Nationalists. Approximately 8,000 of the latter were sent to a Gulag named Karlag and many of them stayed there after having served their sentences. The descendants of the post-World War II Ukrainian immigrants tend to dominate the staffing of Kazakhstan's numerous Ukrainian cultural centers.

== Society and culture ==
In an effort to differentiate the Ukrainian and Russian communities in Kazakhstan, the Kazakh government has actively supported Ukrainian cultural aspirations. It has funded a Ukrainian newspaper. Ukrainian organizations operate freely in Kazakhstan, and currently there are 20 Ukrainian cultural centers that sponsor Sunday schools, choirs, and folk dancing groups. Kazakhstan's capital, Astana, has a Ukrainian high school and Sunday school. The shared sufferings of the Kazakh and Ukrainian peoples at the hands of the Soviets are emphasized by Kazakh-Ukrainian activists.

Although the Ukrainian language continues to be significant in rural areas with compact Ukrainian settlement, and is actively supported by the Kazakh government, the use of the Russian language has come to dominate within Kazakhstan's Ukrainian community. Due to assimilation with Russian culture, the proportion of the Ukrainian population in Kazakhstan who declare the Ukrainian language to be their mother tongue has declined from 78.7% in 1926 to only 36.6% today. Most Ukrainians in Kazakhstan, when faced with pressure from the majority Kazakhs, have tended to relate to Russians. There is thus somewhat of a cultural divide within Kazakhstan's Ukrainian community between those who maintain a Ukrainian political and cultural identity (largely descendants of mid 20th century immigrants) and those who have become culturally and linguistically Russified (the descendants of those who migrated to Kazakhstan earlier).

The Ukrainian Greek Catholic Church began its existence in Kazakhstan when the first western Ukrainians were exiled there during and after World War II. Centered in Karaganda, the Church services were conducted in people's homes until 1978, when the first Roman Catholic church was built. The first Ukrainian Greek Catholic Church was built in 1996. Currently, Kazakhstan has nine parishes of the Ukrainian Greek Catholic Church. The Ukrainian Greek Catholic community was visited in 2002 by the head of the Ukrainian Greek Catholic Church, Major archbishop Lubomyr Husar.

== Notable Ukrainians in Kazakhstan ==
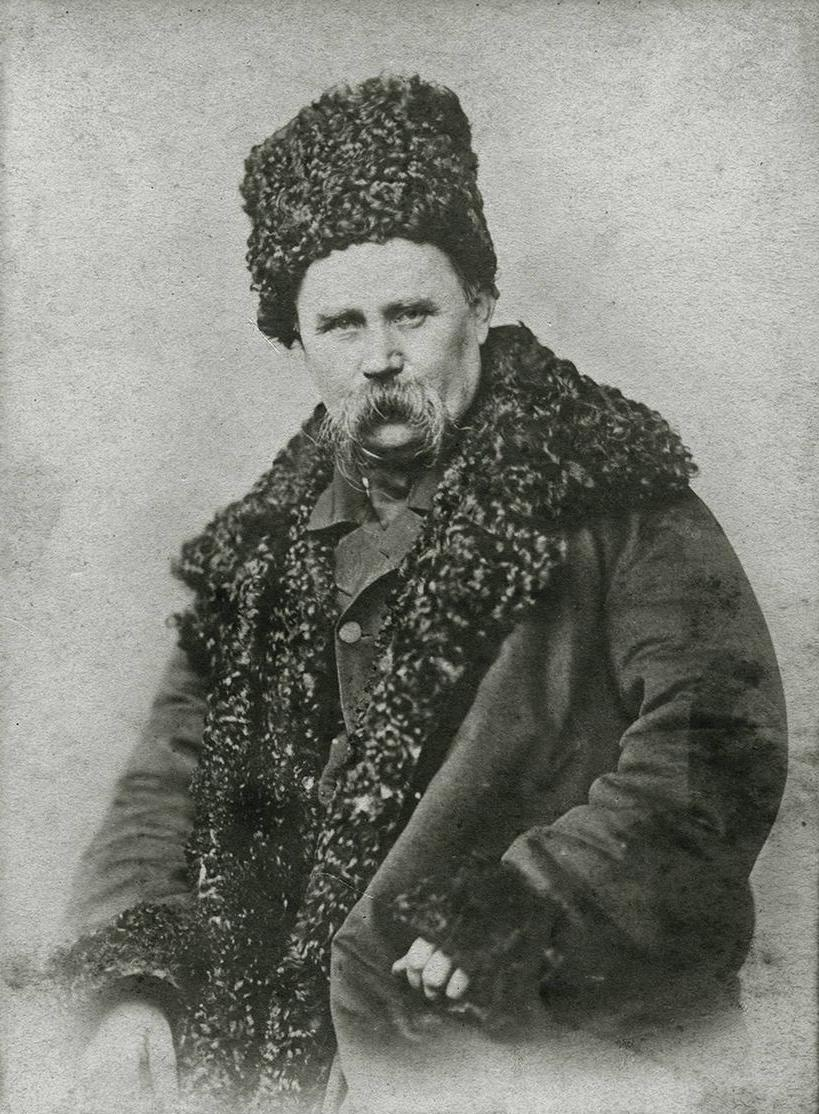
Taras Shevchenko

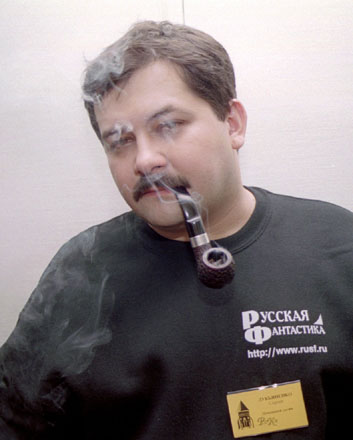
Sergei Lukyanenko

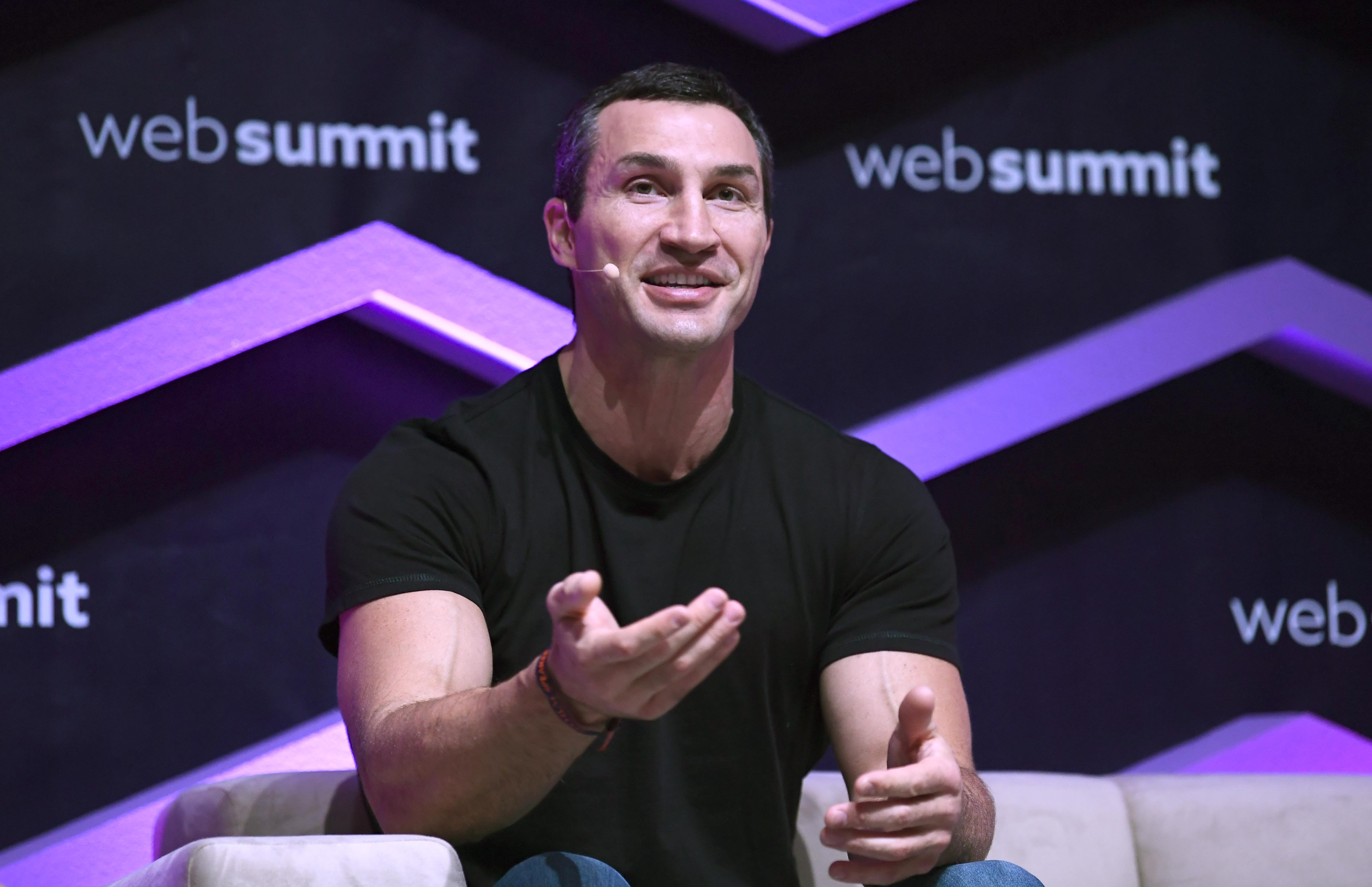
Wladimir Klitschko

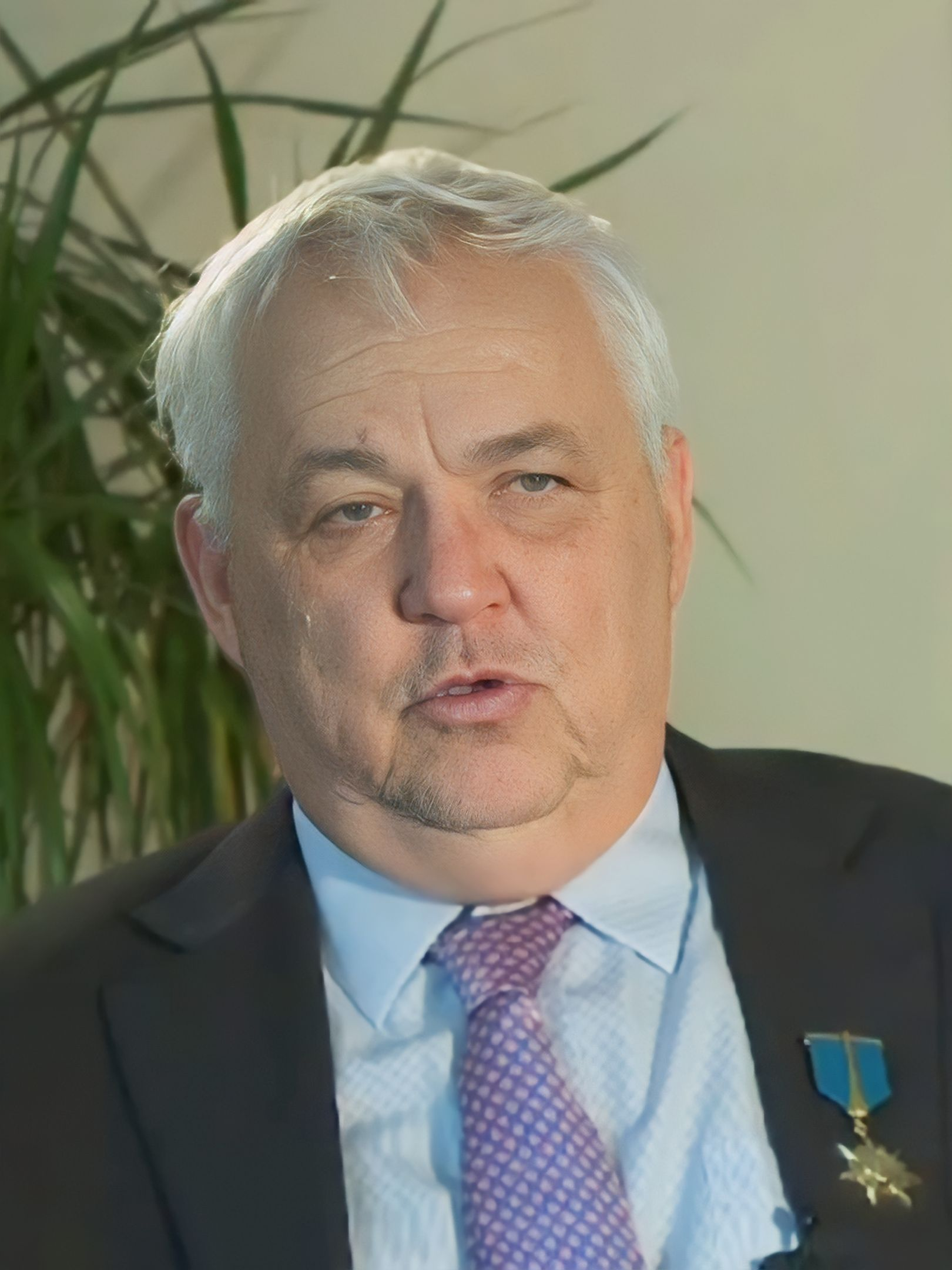
Sergey Tereshchenko

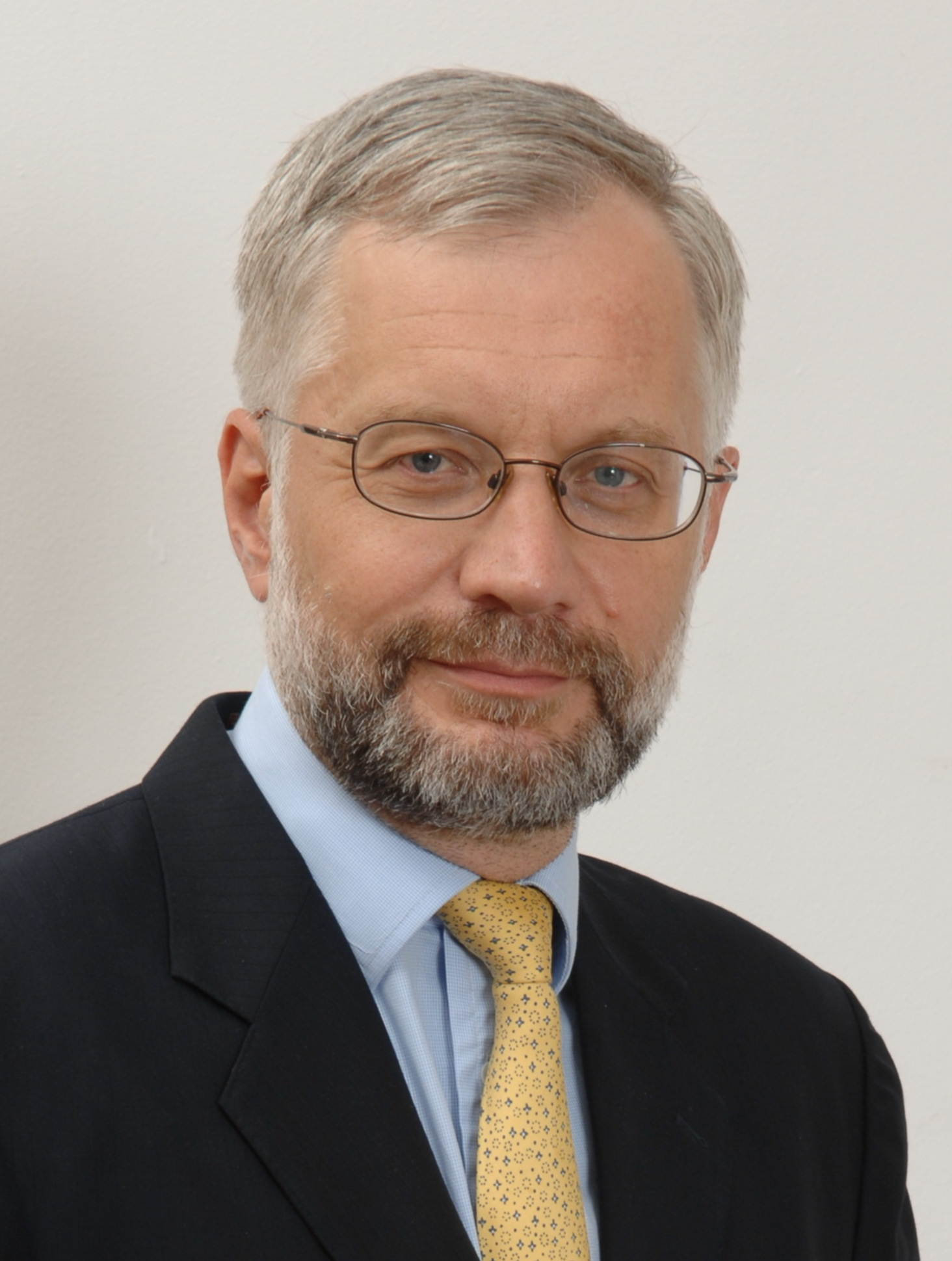
Grigori Marchenko

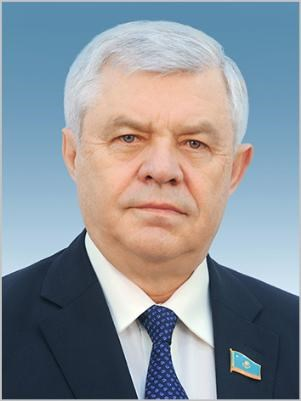
Vladimir Bozhko

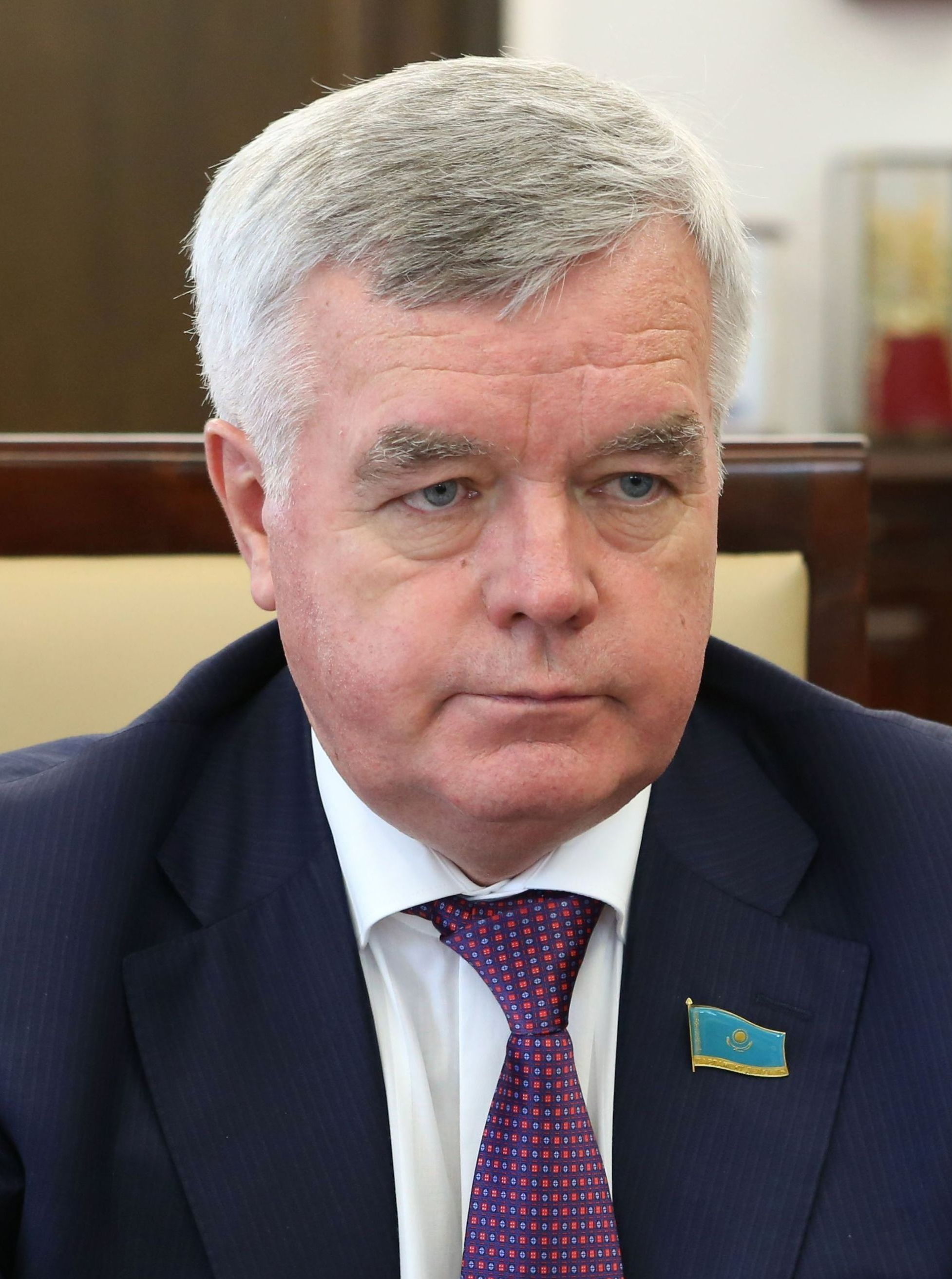
Sergey Dyachenko

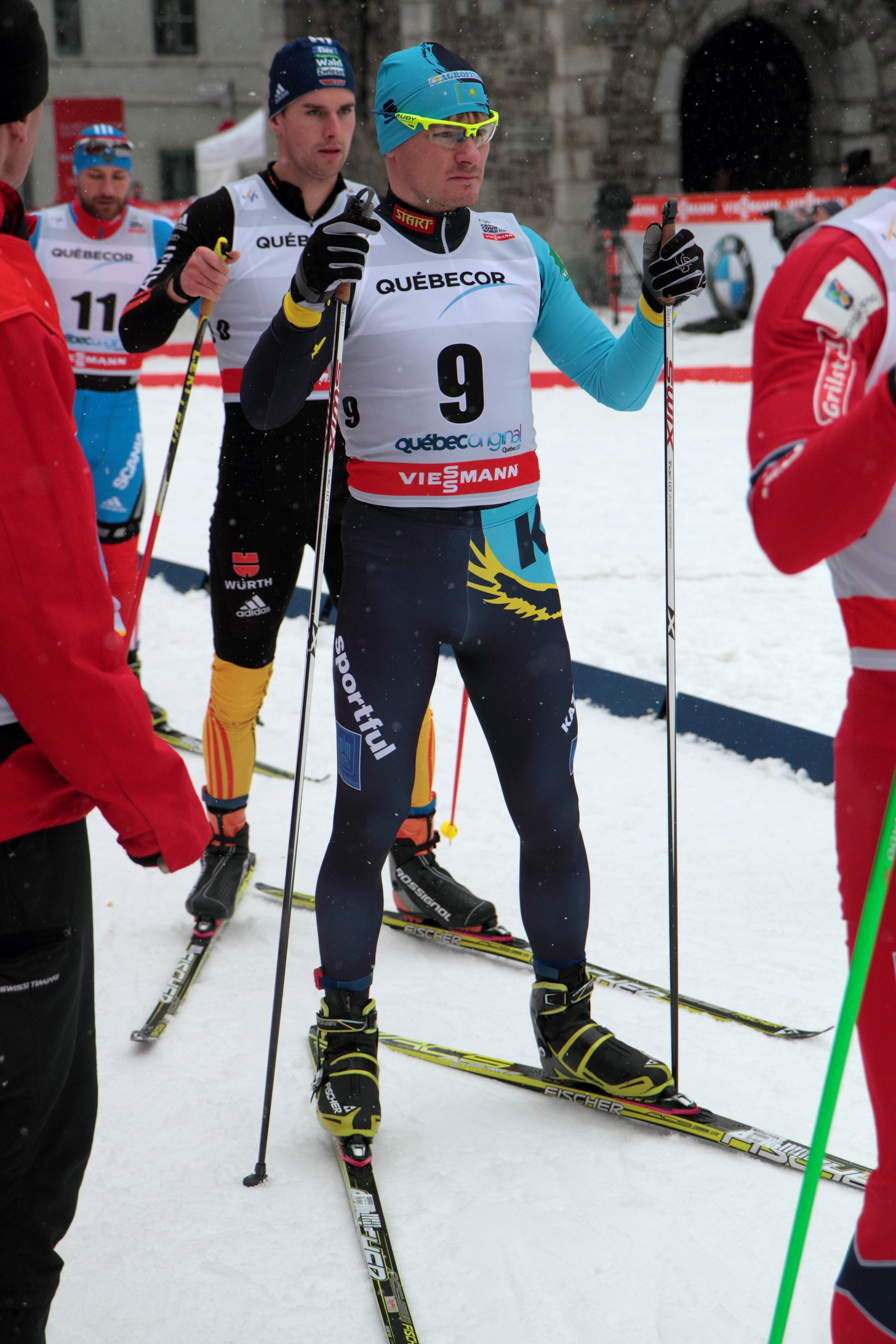
Nikolay Chebotko

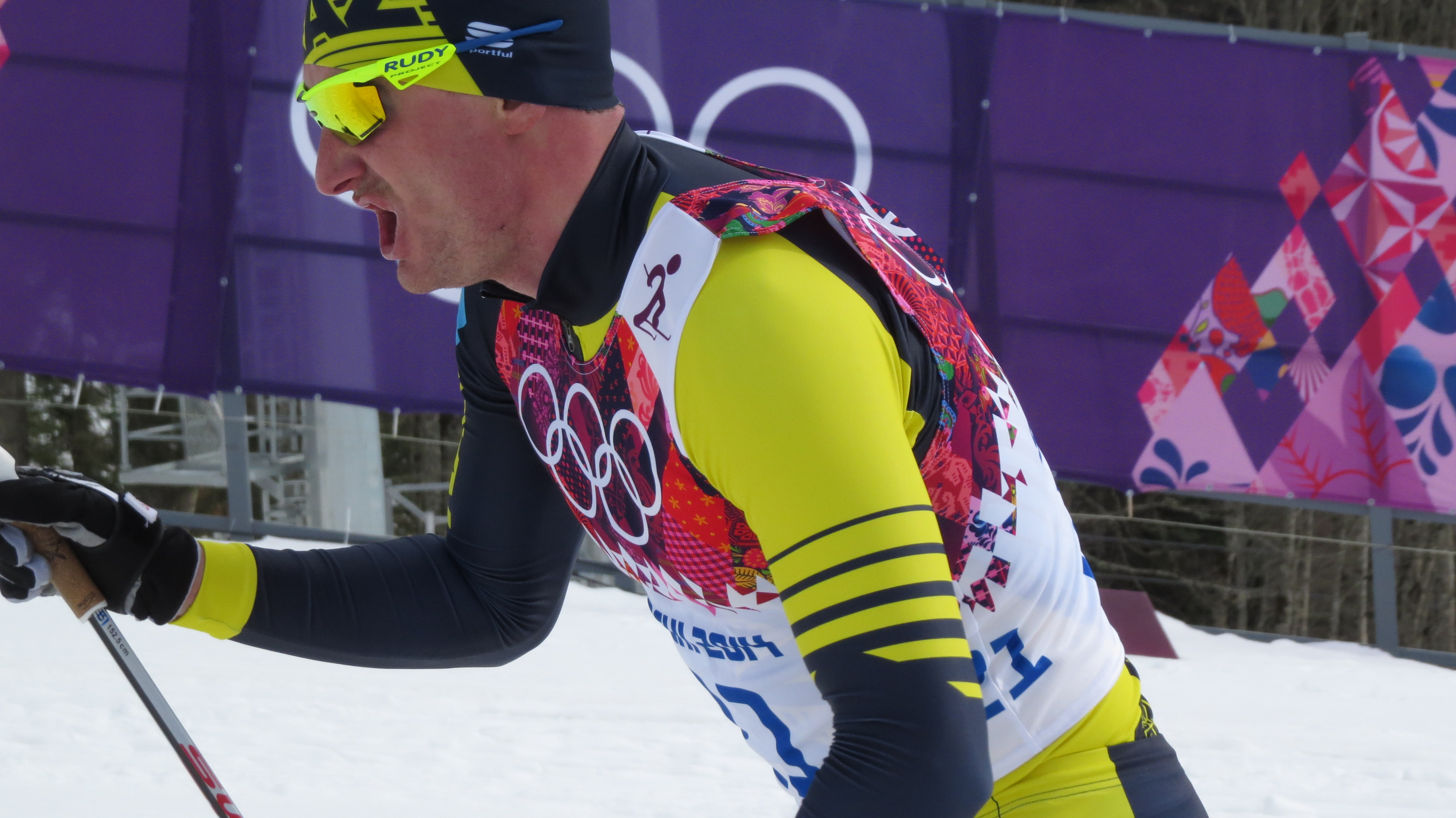
Yevgeniy Velichko

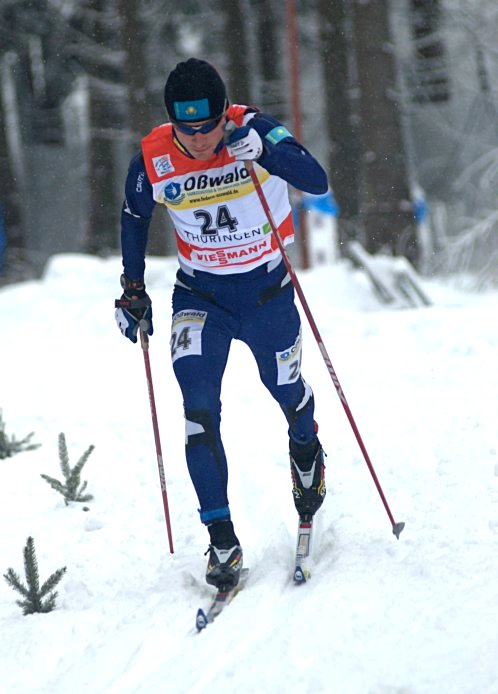
Andrey Golovko

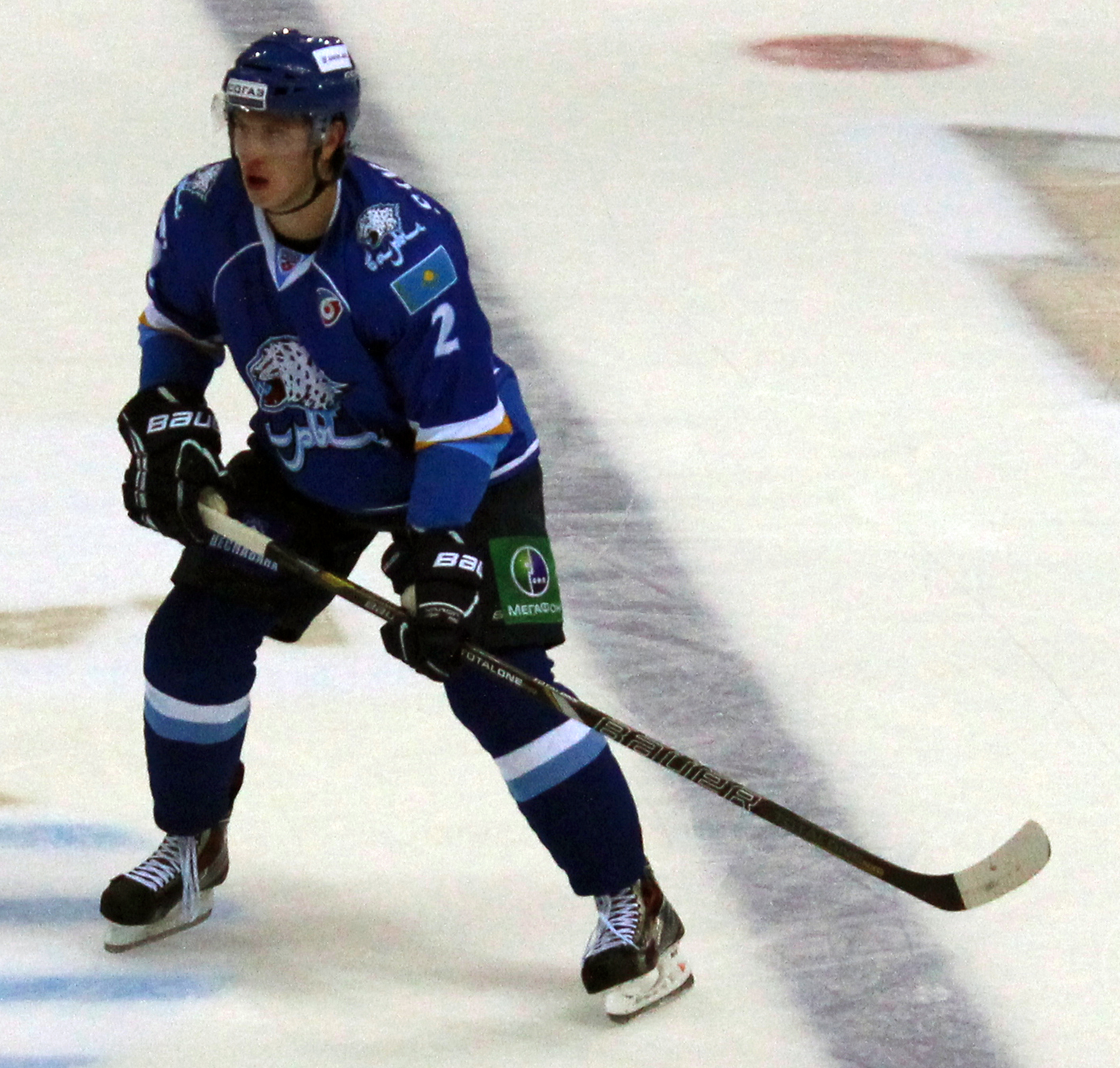
Roman Savchenko

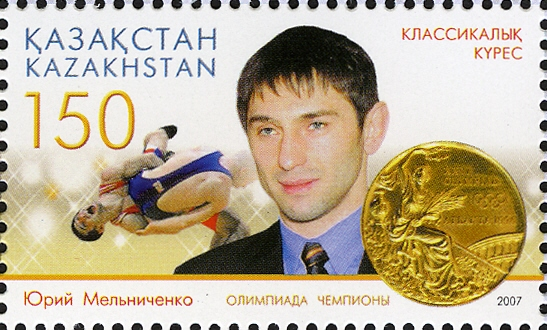
Yuriy Melnichenko

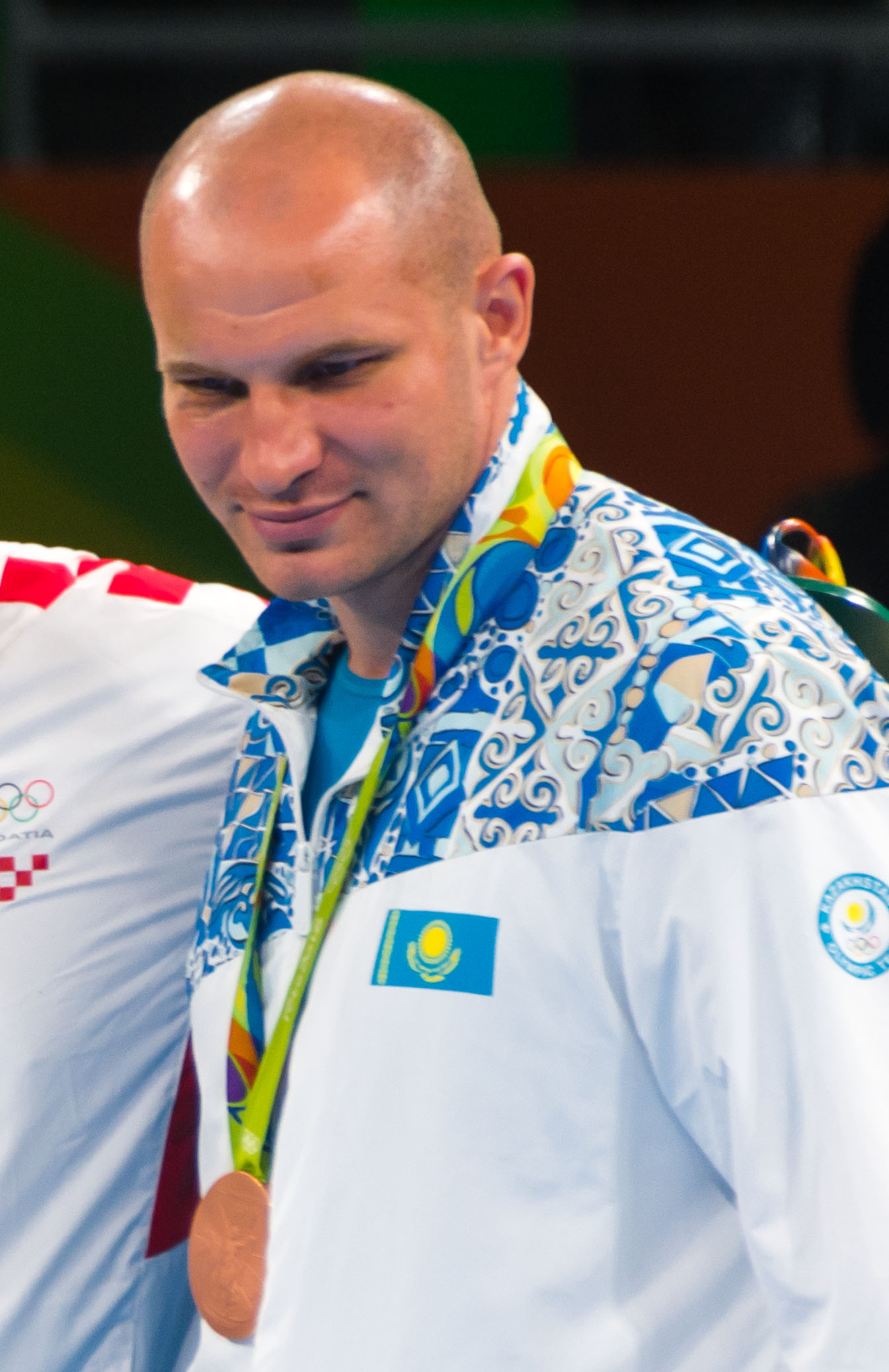
Ivan Dychko

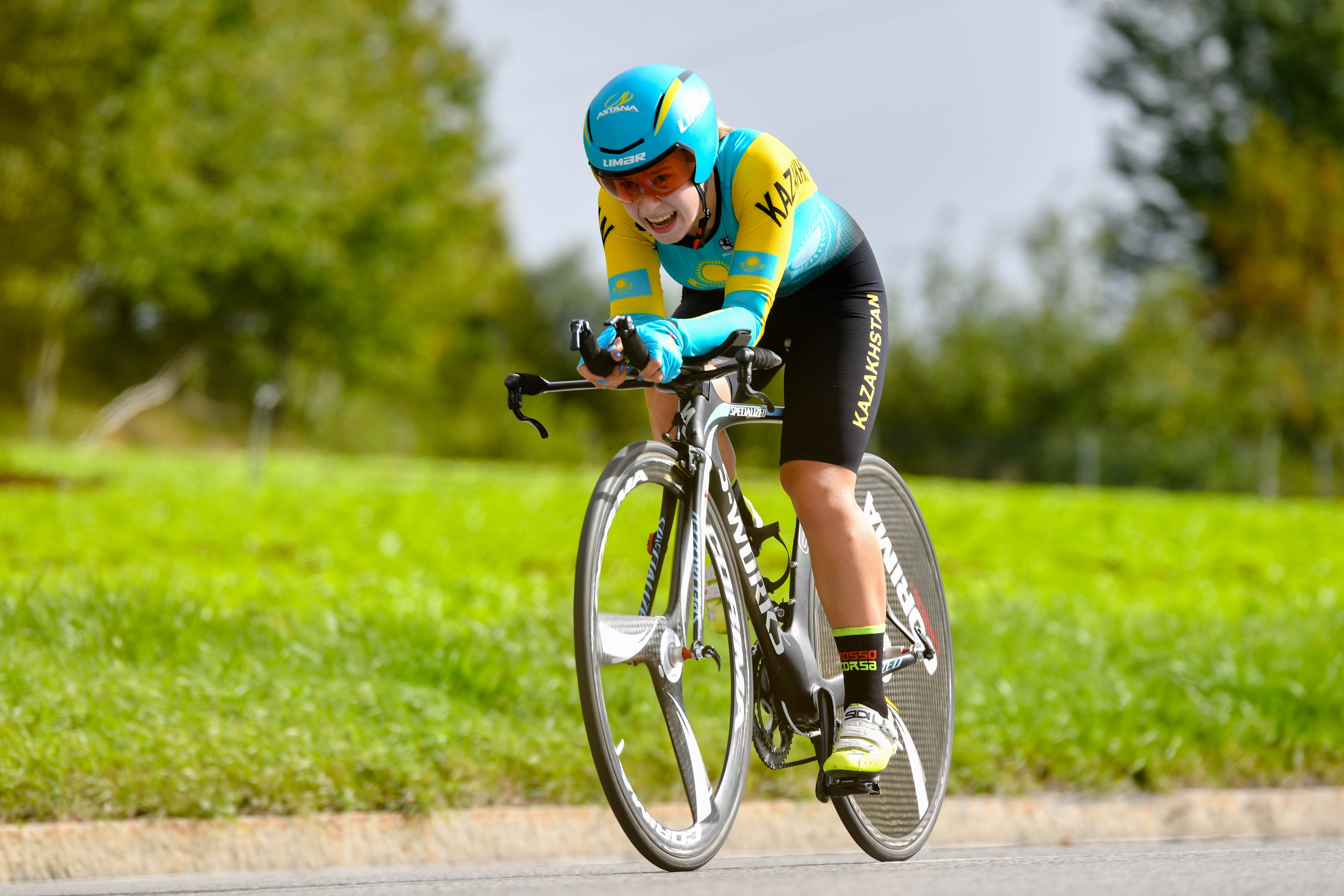
Svetlana Pachshenko

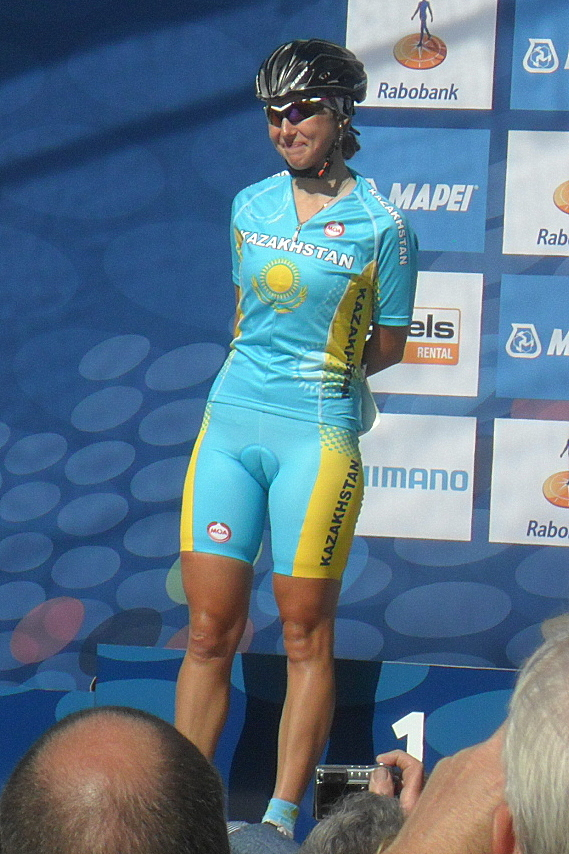
Rimma Luchshenko

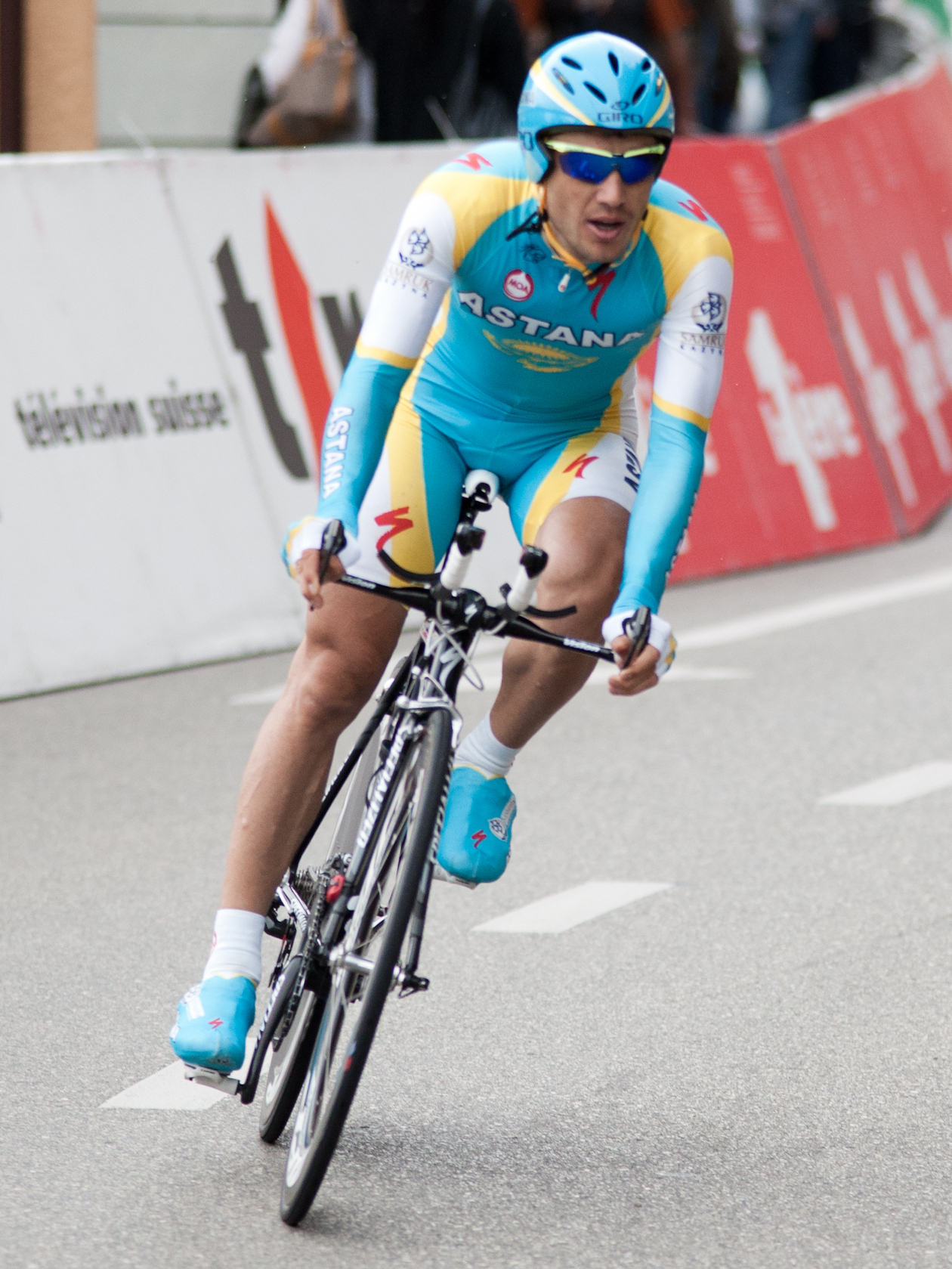
Alexsandr Dyachenko

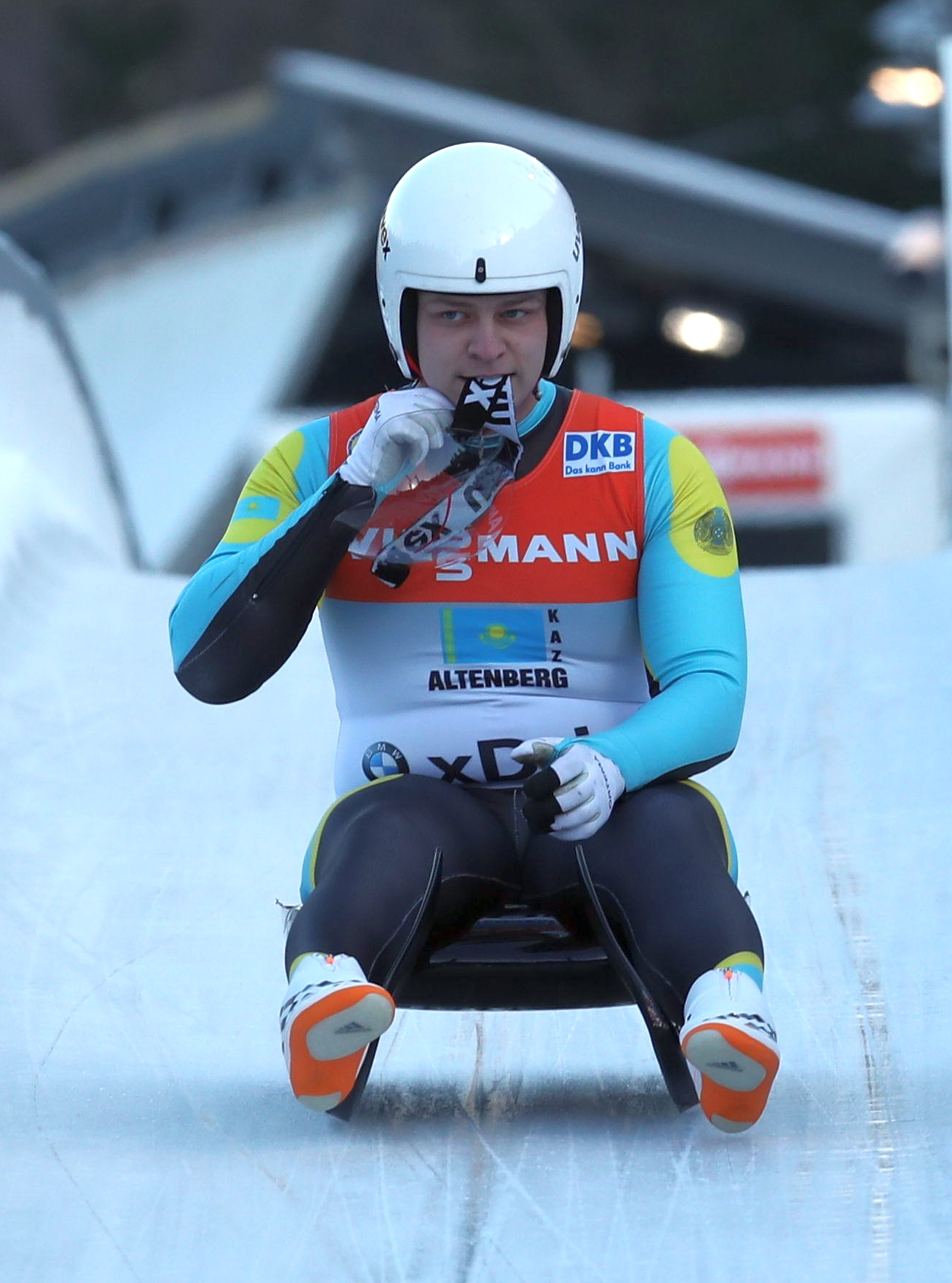
Nikita Kopyrenko

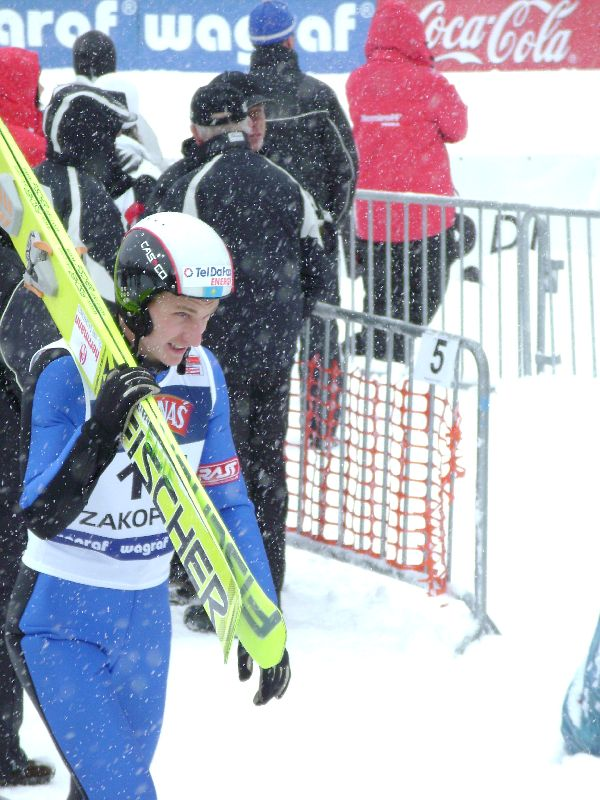
Nikolay Karpenko

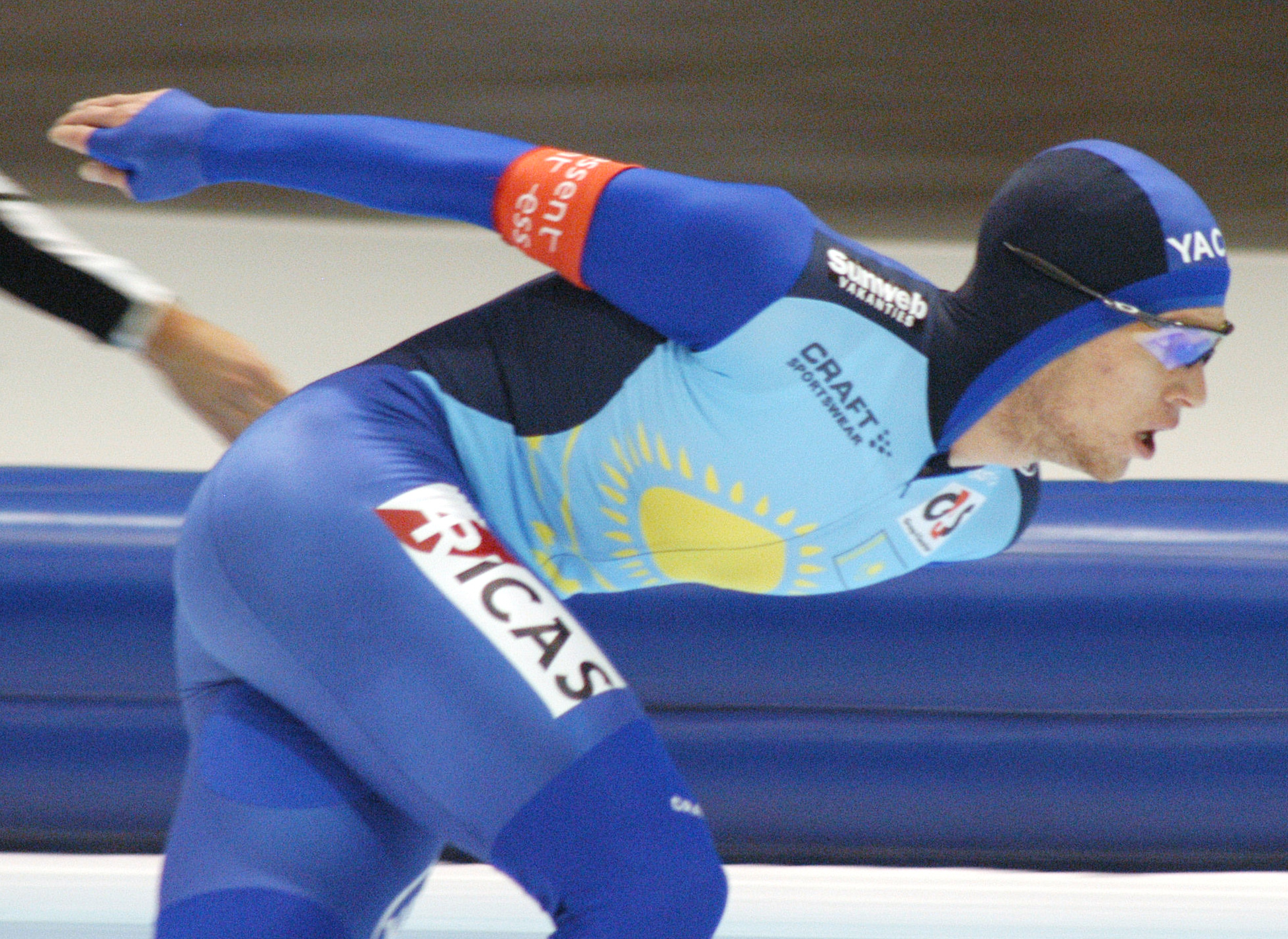
Dmitriy Babenko

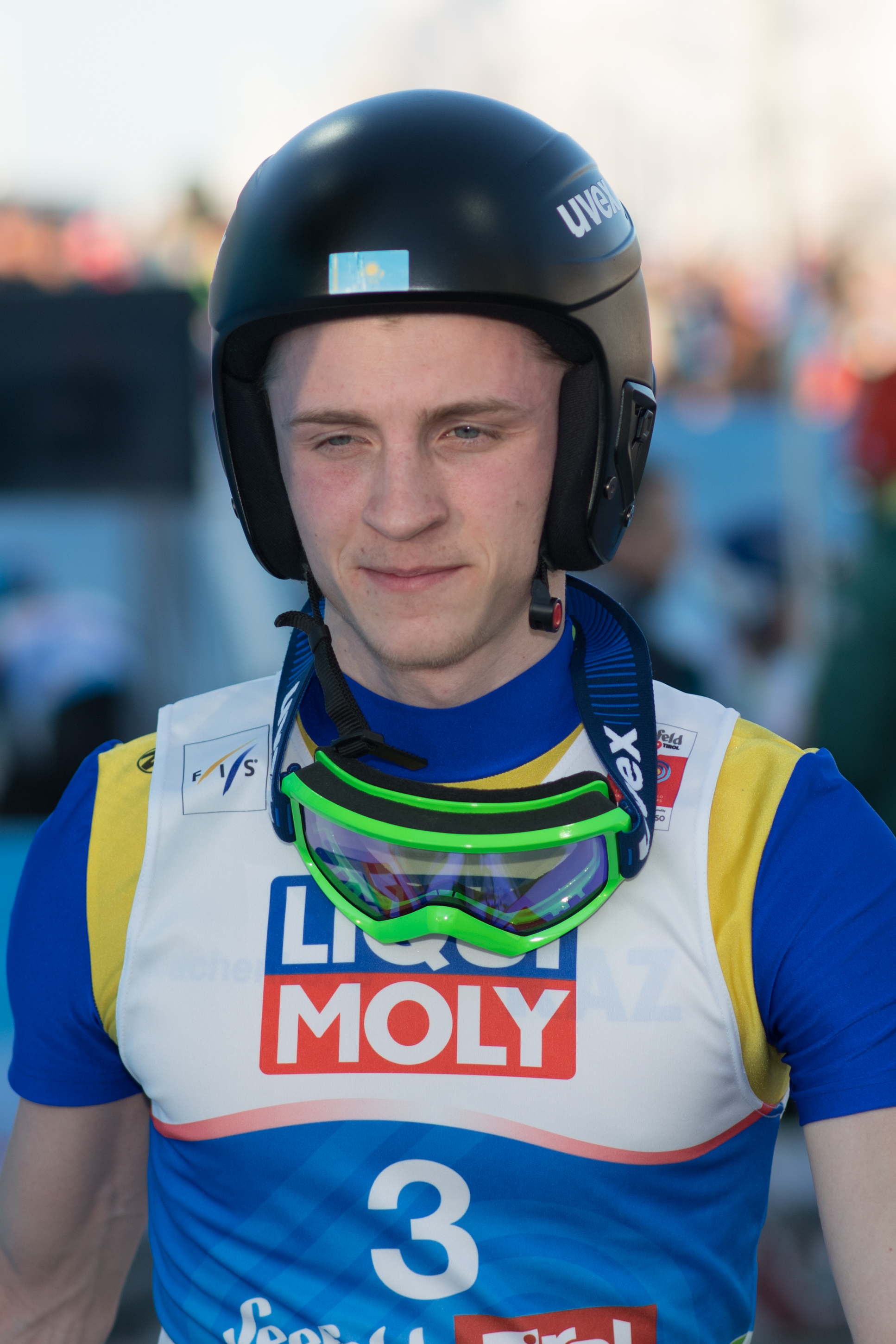
Sergey Tkachenko

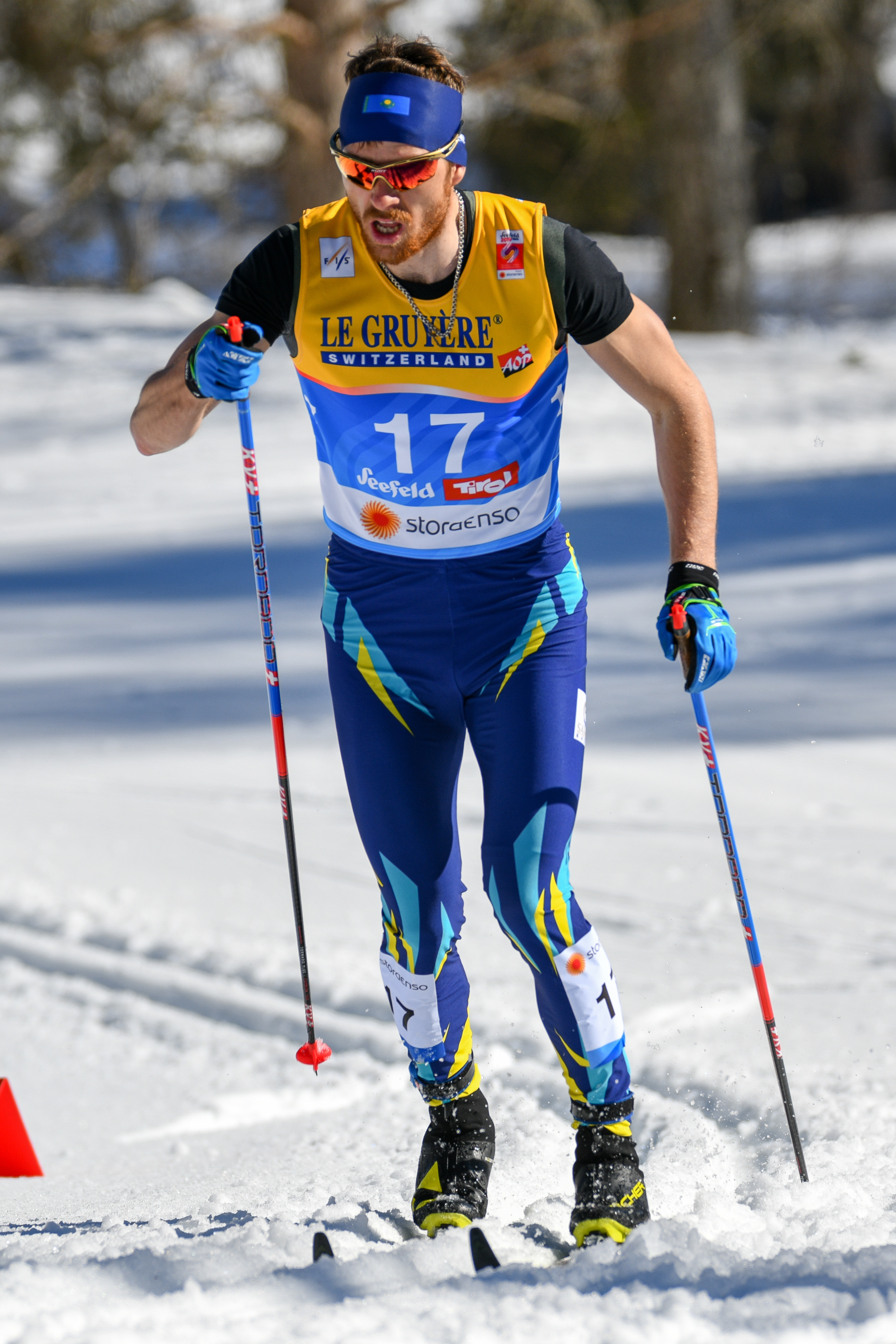
Vitaliy Pukhkalo

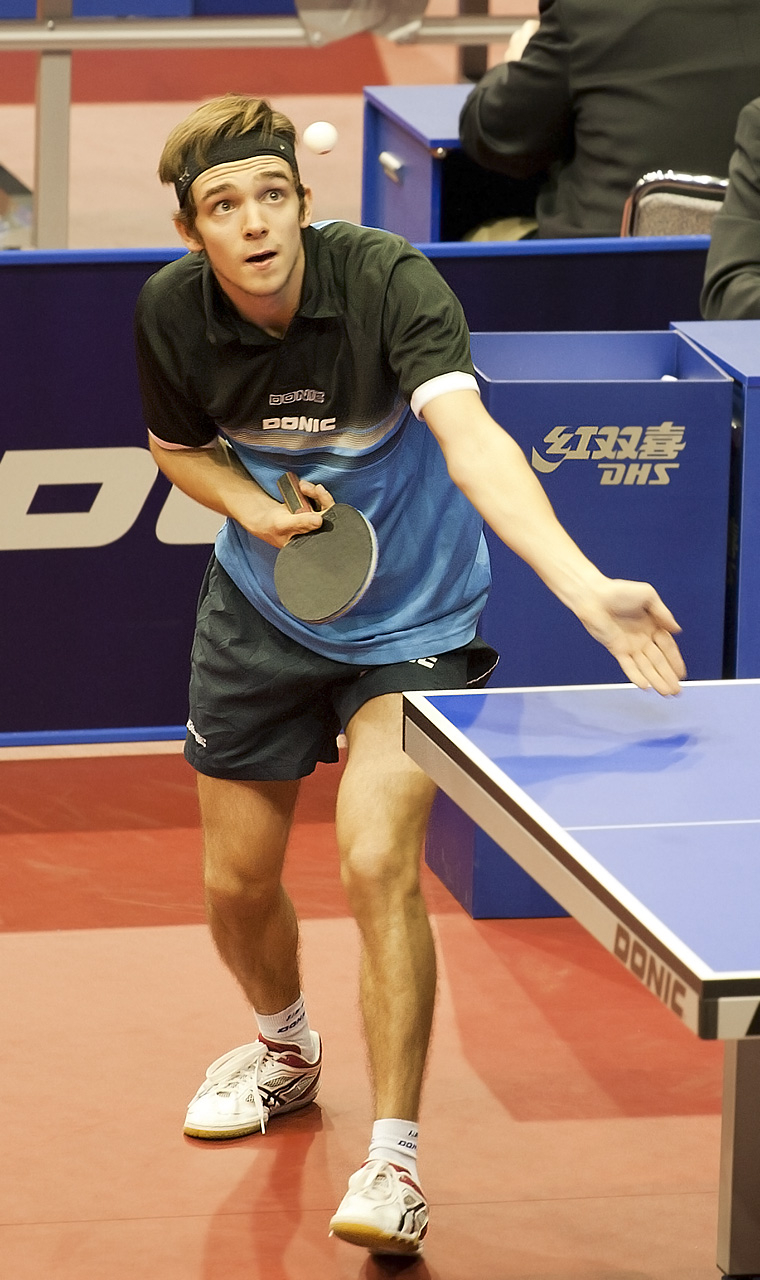
Kirill Gerassimenko

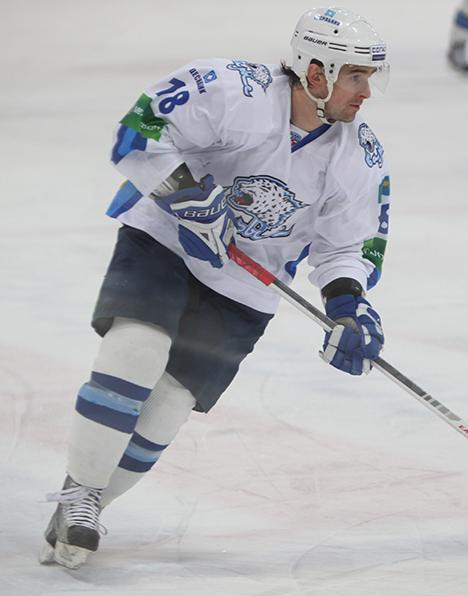
Fyodor Polishchuk

- Taras Shevchenko — Ukrainian poet, prose writer, thinker, painter, ethnographer, and public figure. From 1850 to 1857, he was held in exile at the Novopetrovskoye military fortification (now the city of Fort-Shevchenko, Kazakhstan)
- Wladimir Klitschko — professional boxer, native of Kazakhstan, and multiple-time world heavyweight champion
- Sergey Tereshchenko — the first Prime Minister of independent Kazakhstan (1991–1994)
- Alexander Savchenko - member of the Nur Otan party, he served in the Senate of Kazakhstan from 2008 to 2014
- Vladimir Bozhko - Deputy Chair of the Mazhilis from 2016 to 2020, former Minister of Minister of Emergency Situations of Kazakhstan
- Sergey Dyachenko - Deputy Chairman of the Mäjilis from 2012 to 2016, member of the Mäjilis from 2012 to 2016, and Akim of Aktobe Region from 2010 to 2012
- Sergei Lukyanenko - science fiction and fantasy author (born in Karatau, Kazakh SSR)
- Grigory Marchenko — Kazakhstani financier, banker, and economist; served twice as the Chairman of the National Bank of Kazakhstan
- Olga Korotko - filmmaker
- Yuriy Melnichenko — Kazakhstani Greco-Roman wrestler and coach; two-time Asian champion (1996, 1997), two-time world champion (1994, 1997), and Olympic champion (1996). Head coach of the Kazakhstan national Greco-Roman wrestling team (2000–2004).
- Ivan Dychko — Kazakhstani boxer; bronze medalist at the 2012 London and 2016 Rio de Janeiro Olympics; three-time World Championship medalist (2011, 2013, 2015); 2013 Asian champion and 2014 Asian Games champion in Incheon.
- Anatoly Khrapaty — Kazakhstani weightlifter; winner of the 1988 Olympic Games in Seoul and medalist at the 1996 Olympic Games in Atlanta; five-time world champion and five-time European weightlifting champion.
- Andrey Finonchenko — long-time member of the Kazakhstan national football team; named Kazakhstan's Footballer of the Year in 2013
- Viktor Demyanenko — silver medalist at the 1980 Summer Olympics in Moscow and European champion.
- Alexander Miroshnichenko — Kazakhstani boxer; three-time USSR champion (1986, 1988, 1989), two-time European Championship medalist (1983, 1989), World Championship medalist (1989), and Olympic medalist (1988) in the super-heavyweight division
- Petr Kostenko - chess player
- Mikhail Yurchenko - boxer
- Oleg Litvinenko — a forward for the Kazakhstan national football team from 1996 to 2006. For six years, he held the record for the Kazakhstan Championship with 148 goals scored.
- Alexey Sivokon — Kazakhstani powerlifter and multiple-time world champion.
- Olga Dovgun — Kazakhstani athlete, air rifle shooter, and two-time world champion.
- Nikolay Chebotko — Kazakhstani cross-country skier, medalist at the 2013 World Championships, and participant in three Olympic Games.
- Sergei Khizhnichenko — Kazakhstani footballer, forward for the Kazakhstan national team. Two-time champion of Kazakhstan (2011, 2012).
- Yuriy Logvinenko — Kazakhstani footballer, defender for the Kazakhstan national team. Five-time champion of Kazakhstan.
- Dmitriy Shomko — Kazakhstani footballer, defender for the Kazakhstan national team. Three-time champion of Kazakhstan (2014, 2015, 2016).
- Oleksiy Zaryckyy — Greek Catholic priest; in 2001, he was beatified by Pope John Paul II
- Mykola Simkaylo - eparch of the Ukrainian Catholic Eparchy of Kolomyia – Chernivtsi in Ukraine since 2 June 2005 until his death (Born in Karaganda, Kazakh SSR)
- Alexandr Kuchma - football coach and former professional player who played as a defender
- Michael Antonyuk - prominent honorary artist of the Republic of Kazakhstan, a monumentalist, and a member of the Union of Artists of the USSR
- Leonid Beda — twice Hero of the Soviet Union, Honored Military Pilot of the USSR, and Lieutenant General of Aviation
- Victor Sydorenko - painter, curator, teacher, an author of objects and photocompositions and also scientific and publicistic texts (Born in Taldy-Kurgan, Kazakh SSR)
- Alexey Lutsenko, road race cyclist
- Konstantin Sokolenko - Nordic combined skier
- Nikolay Karpenko - ski jumper
- Nikita Kopyrenko - luger
- Vitaliy Pukhkalo - cross-country skier
- Anna Shevchenko - cross-country skier
- Yevgeniy Meleshenko - hurdler
- Sergey Tkachenko - ski jumper
- Yevgeniya Voloshenko - cross-country skier
- Vladislav Vitenko - biathlete
- Vera Yeremenko - alpine skier
- Anna Gavriushenko - sprinter who specializes in the 400 metres
- Marina Maslyonko - sprinter who specializes in the 400 metres
- Georgiy Sheiko - racewalker
- Andrey Sklyarenko - hurdler who specialized in the 110 metres hurdles
- Veniamin Soldatenko - Soviet athlete who competed mainly in the 50 km walk
- Dmitriy Yeremenko - cross-country skier
- Artyom Ignatenko - hockey player
- Oleg Kovalenko (ice hockey) - hockey player
- Alexei Litvinenko - hockey player
- Sergei Miroshnichenko (ice hockey) - hockey player
- Fyodor Polishchuk - hockey player
- Natalya Yakovchuk - hockey player
- Dmitri Shevchenko - hockey player
- Maxim Pavlenko - hockey player
- Bogdan Rudenko - hockey player
- Konstantin Spodarenko - hockey player
- Roman Starchenko - hockey player
- Ivan Stepanenko (ice hockey) - hockey player
- Alexei Vasilchenko - hockey player
- Sergey Matviyenko - wrestler
- Anatoly Nazarenko - Soviet wrestler who competed in the 1972 Summer Olympics
- Igor Zagoruiko - water polo player
- Vitaly Lilichenko - cross-country skier
- Viktor Ryabchenko - alpine skier
- Galina Vishnevskaya-Sheporenko - biathlet, competed at the 2014 Winter Olympics in Sochi, in the women's individual and sprint competitions
- Yevgeniy Velichko - cross-country skier, represented Kazakhstan at the 2010 Winter Olympics in Vancouver
- Igor Soloshenko - football coach and a former defender
- Evgeny Yarovenko - (born 17 August 1963 in Chulaktau, Kazakh SSR) is a Kazakhstani and Ukrainian football manager and former player who manages Sumy.
- Oleksandr Yarovenko - Ukrainian professional footballer who plays as a forward for Ukrainian club VPK-Ahro Shevchenkivka (Born in Alma-Ata, Kazakh SSR)
- Roman Savchenko - professional ice hockey defenceman who currently plays for Barys Nur-Sultan of the Kontinental Hockey League (KHL).
- Evgeniy Averchenko - football midfielder who plays for FC Taraz
- Sergey Zhunenko - former professional footballer who played as a defender or midfielder
- Konstantin Gorovenko - football coach and a former international player who is the head coach of Caspiy
- Sergei Dotsenko Soviet footballer
- Oleg Korniyenko - football coach and a former player
- Sergey Kostyuk - retired footballer who played as a midfielder
- Pavel Gaiduk - ski jumper
- Alexey Kedryuk - tennis player
- Sergey Kostiv - volleyball player
- Dmitriy Gordiyenko - swimmer
- Yekaterina Dmitrichenko - tennis player
- Natalia Ilienko - Soviet gymnast
- Anastassiya Gorodko - freestyle skier
- Natalya Issachenko - cross-country skier
- Andrei Miroshnichenko - footballer
- Dmitry Miroshnichenko - footballer
- Sergei Mishchenko - footballer
- Roman Nesterenko - footballer
- Sergei Ostapenko - footballer
- Aleksandr Grigorenko - footballer
- Aleksandr Goncharenko - footballer
- Viktor Dmitrenko - footballer
- Sergey Boychenko - footballer
- Danil Ustimenko - footballer
- Roman Pilipenko - water polo player
- Alexey Sidorenko - beach volleyball player, competed at the 2012 Asian Beach Games in Haiyang, China
- Alexandr Babenko - ski-orienteering competitor
- Nikolay Braichenko - biathlete
- Mariya Dmitriyenko - sports shooter
- Alexandr Dyachenko - beach volleyball player
- Alexandr Dyadchuk - sprint canoeist who competed in the late 2000s and 2010s
- Andrey Golovko - cross-country skier, competed at the Winter Olympics in 2002 in Salt Lake City, and in Turin in 2006, placing 29th in the 30 km and 29th in the 50 km
- Vadim Kravchenko - former cyclist
- Sergey Lavrenenko - former cyclist
- Zoya Kravchenko - sports shooter
- Maksim Samchenko - footballer
- Eduard Sergienko - footballer
- Maksim Shevchenko (footballer, born 1980) - professional football coach and former player
- Denis Prokopenko - footballer
- Vladislav Prokopenko - footballer
- Konstantin Pavlyuchenko - footballer
- Yuliya Nikolayenko - footballer
- Roman Pakholyuk - footballer
- Alexandra Dzigalyuk - volleyball player
- Angelina Michshuk - sport shooter
- Andrey Teteryuk - former professional road bicycle racer
- Serhiy Tkachuk - professional Ukrainian-born Kazakhstani football goalkeeper
- Ivan Tsissaruk - road track cyclist
- Olga Leshchuk - water polo player
- Yekaterina Babshuk - football player
- Kirill Pasichnik - footballer, played for FC Astana
- Dmitriy Babenko - speed skater
- Sergey Ilyushchenko - speed skater
- Alla Vasilenko - track and road cyclist
- Sergey Fedorchenko - gymnast who competed in the 1996 Summer Olympics and in the 2000 Summer Olympics
- Zoya Ananchenko - sprint canoeist
- Alexey Dmitriyenko - gumnast
- Igor Patenko - Soviet former cyclist
- Kirill Gerassimenko - table tennis player
- Irina Gritsenko - badminton player
- Pavel Ilyashenko - modern pentathlete
- Kseniya Ilyuchshenko - volleyball player
- Vladimir Issachenko - sport shooter
- Yuliya Kutsko - volleyball player
- Olga Grushko - volleyball player
- Vitaliy Lilichenko - ski-orienteering competitor
- Anatoli Klimenko - sport shooter, competed in rifle shooting events at the 1996 and 2000 Summer Olympics (Born in Karaganda)
- Vitaliy Mironenko - volleyball player
- Aleksandr Okhramenko - weightlifter
- Yelena Potapenko - modern pentathlete
- Yekaterina Rudenko - swimmer
- Vyacheslav Titarenko - swimmer, who specialized in sprint freestyle events
- Yury Tsapenko - Soviet artistic gymnast
- Makar Yurchenko - motorcycle racer
- Alexsandr Dyachenko - former professional road bicycle racer, who rode professionally from 2004 to 2006 and 2008 to 2015, for the Capec, Ulan and Astana teams
- Rimma Luchshenko - road cyclist
- Alexey Lyalko - track cyclist
- Lyubov Nikitenko - former track and field hurdler for the Soviet Union
- Tatyana Yurchenko - track and field athlete who competes in the 400 metres and 800 metres
- Svetlana Pachshenko - racing cyclist
- Nikita Panassenko - cyclist
- Irina Borechko - handball player
- Yelena Klimenko - handball player
- Viktor Demyanenko (judoka)
- Irina Borodavko - water polo player
- Marina Gritsenko - water polo player
- Sergey Kotenko - Soviet water polo player who competed in the 1976 Summer Olympics, in the 1980 Summer Olympics, and in the 1988 Summer Olympics

== See also ==
- Kazakhstan–Ukraine relations
- Russians in Kazakhstan
