= Mishchenko =

Mishchenko (Ukrainian: Міщенко) is a Ukrainian surname, and may refer to:

- Aleksandr Mishchenko (born 1997), German-Kyrgyz footballer
- Alexandr Mishchenko (born 1941), Russian mathematician
- Andriy Mishchenko (born 1991), Ukrainian footballer
- Anna Mishchenko (born 1983), Ukrainian middle-distance runner
- Maksim Mishchenko (born 1977), Russian politician
- Michael I. Mishchenko (1959–2020), Ukrainian-American physicist
- Mikhail Mishchenko (born 1989), Russian footballer
- Oleh Mishchenko (born 1989), Ukrainian footballer
- Olga Mishchenko (born 1971), Ukrainian sprinter
- Olia Mishchenko (born 1980), Canadian artist
- Pavel Mishchenko (1853–1918), military officer and statesman in the Russian Empire
- Sergei Mishchenko (born 1961), Kazakh footballer
- Serhiy Mishchenko, Ukrainian businessman
- Syla Mishchenko (1897–1941), Ukrainian military officer
- Vitaliy Mishchenko (born 1975), Ukrainian footballer

== See also ==
- 22686 Mishchenko, minor planet
