= Kazakhstan–Ukraine relations =

- Kazakhstan: Ukraine

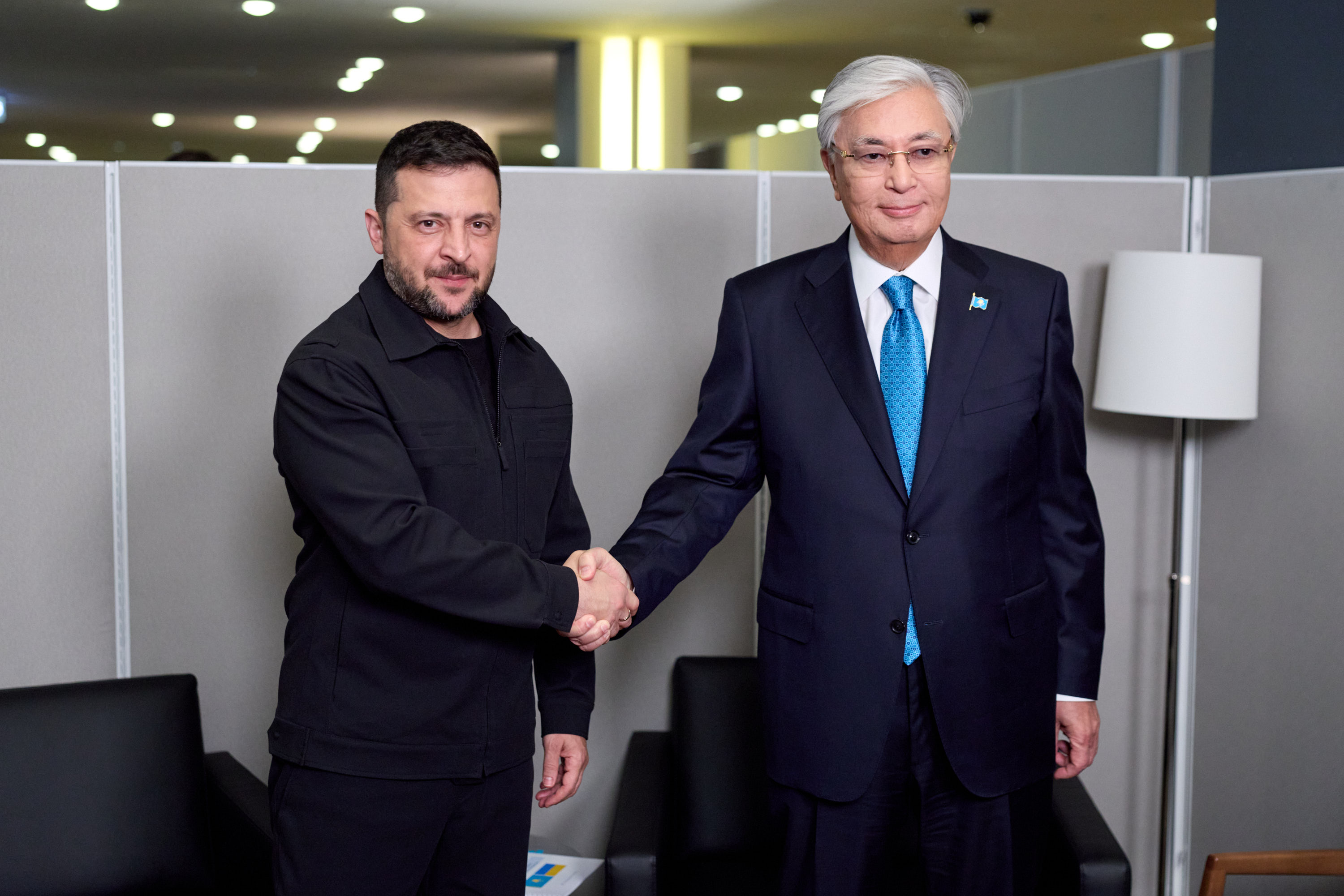
Ukrainian President Volodymyr Zelenskyy with Kazakh President Kassym-Jomart Tokayev during the United Nations General Assembly in September 2025

Kazakhstan–Ukraine relations are foreign relations between Kazakhstan and Ukraine. Before 1918, both countries were part of the Russian Empire and until 1991 they were part of the USSR. Both countries established diplomatic relations on 23 July 1992. Kazakhstan has an embassy in Kyiv and an honorary consulate in Odesa. Ukraine has an embassy in Astana and a consulate-general in Almaty. There are between 895,000 and 2,400,000 ethnic Ukrainians living in Kazakhstan. Both countries are full members of TRACECA, Baku Initiative, Euro-Atlantic Partnership Council, Partnership for Peace and the Organization for Security and Co-operation in Europe. They are only 468 kilometres (291 mi) apart at their closest points.

== History ==
On 26–27 September 2001, the President of Ukraine, Leonid Kuchma, paid an official visit to Kazakhstan and held talks with the President of Kazakhstan, Nursultan Nazarbayev. The heads of state signed a joint statement noting their mutual commitment to the development of bilateral cooperation.

On 30–31 May 2005, an official visit to Kazakhstan was paid by the President of Ukraine, Viktor Yushchenko. Talks were held with President Nursultan Nazarbayev, during which issues of cooperation in the oil and gas sector, space research, nuclear energy, tariff and transport policy, as well as culture and education, were discussed.

On 17–18 November 2005, President Nursultan Nazarbayev paid an official visit to Ukraine. During the visit, he held meetings with President Viktor Yushchenko, former President of Ukraine Leonid Kuchma, Chairman of the Verkhovna Rada Volodymyr Lytvyn, and the Governor of Dnipropetrovsk Oblast, Nadiia Deyeva. During the visit, the Kazakhstan–Ukraine Action Plan for 2006–2009 was signed. Nazarbayev also took part in ceremonial events marking the 80th anniversary of the Dnipropetrovsk Higher Vocational School, where he had received his education as a metallurgist.

In 2007, the Year of Kazakhstan in Ukraine was held; 2008 was marked as the Year of Ukraine in Kazakhstan.

On 14 October 2013, Foreign Minister Erlan Idrisov met with Ukrainian Foreign Minister Leonid Kozhara. The two discussed furthering bilateral cooperation amongst the two nations. Also, Ukraine holds the seat for the Organization for Security and Cooperation in Europe (OSCE) and shared what they can learn from Kazakhstan when they held the seat in 2010. Finally, Minister Kozhara announced Ukraine's President Viktor Yanukovych would visit in 2014.

=== Post-Maidan and Russo-Ukrainian war ===
Yanukovych was overthrown as Ukraine's leader in 2014. Although Kazakh ally Russia vehemently opposed the post-revolutionary government in Kyiv, Astana has maintained its own ties despite the change in power.

==== Tokayev presidency ====
On 4 December 2019, on the eve of a state visit to Germany, President Kassym-Jomart Tokayev gave an interview to Deutsche Welle, in which he drew controversy in Ukraine by saying that he did not believe that the annexation of Crimea by the Russian Federation was an invasion while also saying that he believed in the "wisdom of the Russian leadership", drawing condemnation from the Ukrainian Ministry of Foreign Affairs, who issued a demarche in response. After the Russian invasion of Ukraine in early 2022, representatives of the Kazakh leadership, including Tokayev and Foreign Minister Mukhtar Tleuberdi condemned the invasion and refused to recognize the Donetsk People's Republic and Luhansk People's Republic. Since the war, the government has participated in sending aid to Ukraine.

Ukraine praised Tokayev’s statements at the St. Petersburg International Economic Forum, where he stated that Kazakhstan would not recognize “quasi-state entities” that were the DPR and LPR.

On 21 August 2022, Ukrainian ambassador to Kazakhstan Petro Vrublevskiy gave an interview to a Kazakhstani blogger Dias Kuzairov, in which he commented on Russian invasion of Ukraine, saying "the more Russians we kill now, the fewer of them our children will have to kill in the future." Soon after, Vrublevskiy was summoned by Kazakhstan's Foreign Ministry, which deemed these words as "inappropriate for the activities of the ambassador." He had been dismissed on 18 October 2022 by President of Ukraine, Volodymyr Zelenskyy.

On 17 February 2025, Ukrainian drones hit the Kropotkinskaya oil pumping station in Russia's Krasnodar region, disrupting Kazakhstani oil exports.

On 23 September 2025, Presidents Tokayev and Zelenskyy met on the sidelines of the Eightieth session of the United Nations General Assembly. Tokayev expressed Kazakhstan's full support for Ukraine, highlighting the urgency of achieving peace. Zelenskyy acknowledged this support and emphasized the importance of attaining a just and lasting peace with reliable security guarantees.

On 25 July 2026, during a meeting with Russian President Vladimir Putin in Omsk, President Tokayev called for the Russo-Ukrainian war to be “frozen” and for negotiations to resume on the basis of what he described as the “Istanbul Formula 2.0”. He expressed concern over the continued loss of life and said that the conflict should be brought to an end.

== Trade ==
Bilateral trade in 2012 between the two countries is according to officials more than doubled compared with 2010 and reached $4.4 billion.

== See also ==
- Foreign relations of Kazakhstan
- Foreign relations of Ukraine
- Ukrainians in Kazakhstan
