= Sofie Heby Pedersen =

Danish mountain biker

Personal information
- Born: 1 February 2001 (age 25)

Cycling career
- Sport: Cycling
- Discipline: Mountain biking
Medal record
Women's mountain biking
Representing Denmark
World Championships
Bronze medal – third place	2023 Glasgow	Mixed relay
European Championships
Gold medal – first place	2023 Krynica-Zdrój	Under-23 cross-country
Gold medal – first place	2023 Krynica-Zdrój	Mixed relay
Bronze medal – third place	2019 Brno	Mixed relay
Youth Olympics
Gold medal – first place	2018 Buenos Aires	Team

Sofie Heby Pedersen (born 1 February 2001) is a Danish mountain biker. She competed in the women's cross-country event at the 2024 Summer Olympics.

== Major results ==
2023
National Championships

1st Cross-country short track
2nd Cross-country

2024
National Championships

1st Cross-country
1st Cross-country short track
