= Aigul Gareeva =

Russian cyclist (born 2001)

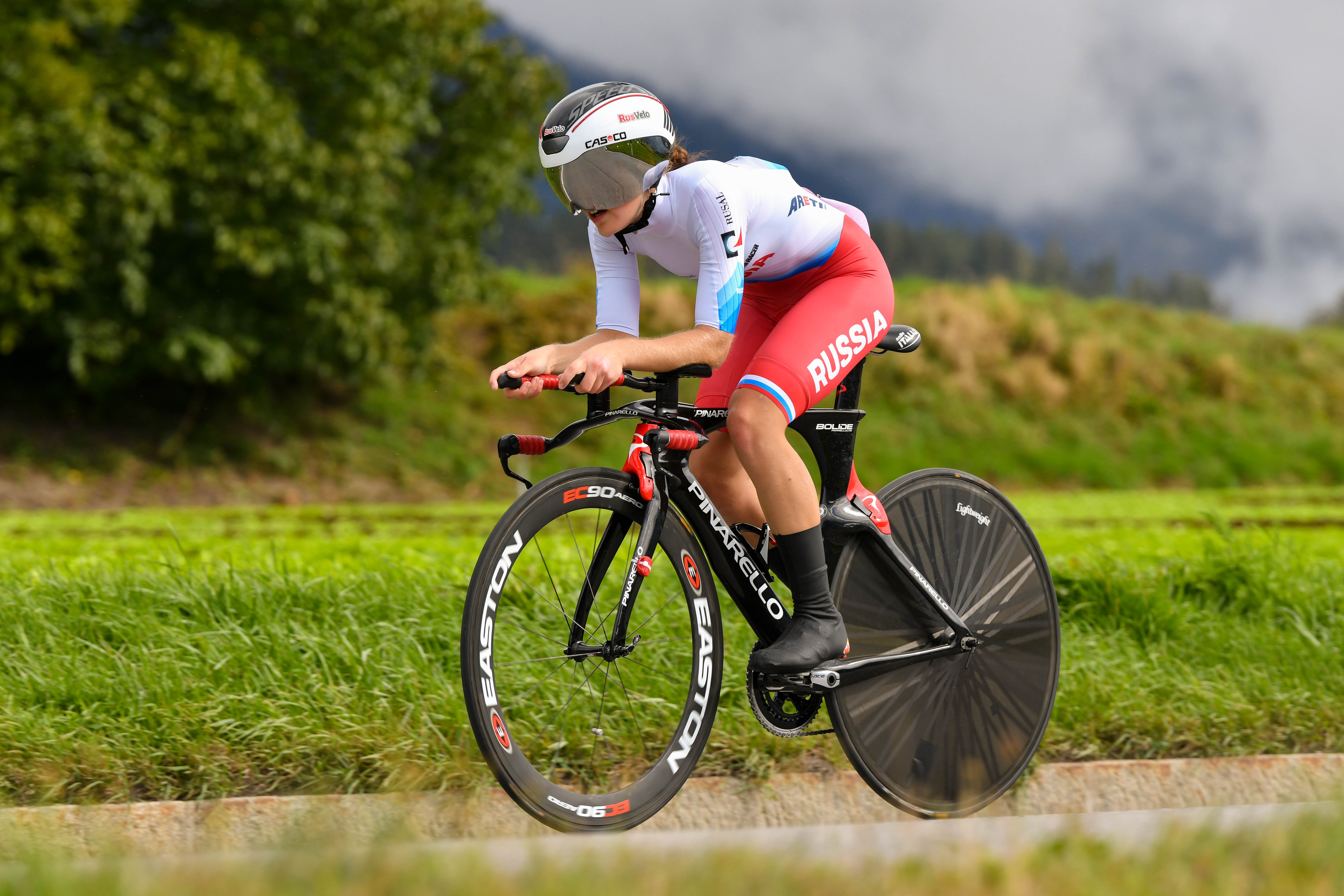
- Gareeva in 2018

Personal information
- Full name: Aigul Gareeva
- Born: 22 August 2001 (age 25)

Cycling career
- Sport: Cycling
- Current team: Roland Le Dévoluy
- Discipline: Road
- Role: Rider

Professional team
- 2020–: Cogeas–Mettler–Look

Aigul Gareeva (born 22 August 2001) is a Russian professional racing cyclist, who currently rides for UCI Women's Continental Team Roland Le Dévoluy. At the 2019 UCI Road World Championships in Yorkshire, England, she won the gold medal in the women's junior time trial event.

In January 2022, Gareeva was provisionally suspended for missing three anti-doping controls. She could face a two-year ban.

== Major results ==
2018
1st Road race, UEC European Junior Road Championships
1st Time trial, National Junior Road Championships
2019
UCI Junior Road World Championships

1st Time trial
4th Road race

National Junior Road Championships

1st Road race
1st Time trial

2nd Time trial, UEC European Junior Road Championships
