= Alexander Savchenko =

Kazakh politician (1951–2022)

- Александр Савченко

Member of the Senate of Kazakhstan
- In office October 2008 – October 2014

First Deputy Akim of Jambyl Region
- In office 1997–2008
- Preceded by: Jumabek Saparaliev
- Succeeded by: Ermek Usenbaev

Personal details
- Born: Alexander Georgievich Savchenko; 30 March 1951 Dzhambul, Kazakh SSR, Soviet Union
- Died: 18 February 2022 (aged 70)
- Party: Nur Otan
- Education: Taraz State University; Almaty School of Management

Alexander Georgievich Savchenko (Russian: Александр Георгиевич Савченко; 30 March 1951 – 18 February 2022) was a Kazakh politician. A member of the Nur Otan party, he served in the Senate of Kazakhstan from 2008 to 2014. He died on 18 February 2022, at the age of 70.

== Biography ==
Savchenko was born on March 30, 1951, in the city of Dzhambul.

In 1977, he graduated from the Jambyl Technological Institute of Light and Food Industry in the specialty "Mechanical Engineer".

In 1991, he graduated the Almaty Institute of Political Science and Department in the specialty "Lecturer of socio-political disciplines in higher and secondary educational institutions".

== Awards and titles ==
- Order of Kurmet (2003)
- Order of Friendship, II degree (2011)
- Medal "For the difference in the prevention and elimination of emergency situations".
- Jubilee medal "20 years to Astana" (2018)
