= Marina Kurnossova =

Kazakhstani cyclist

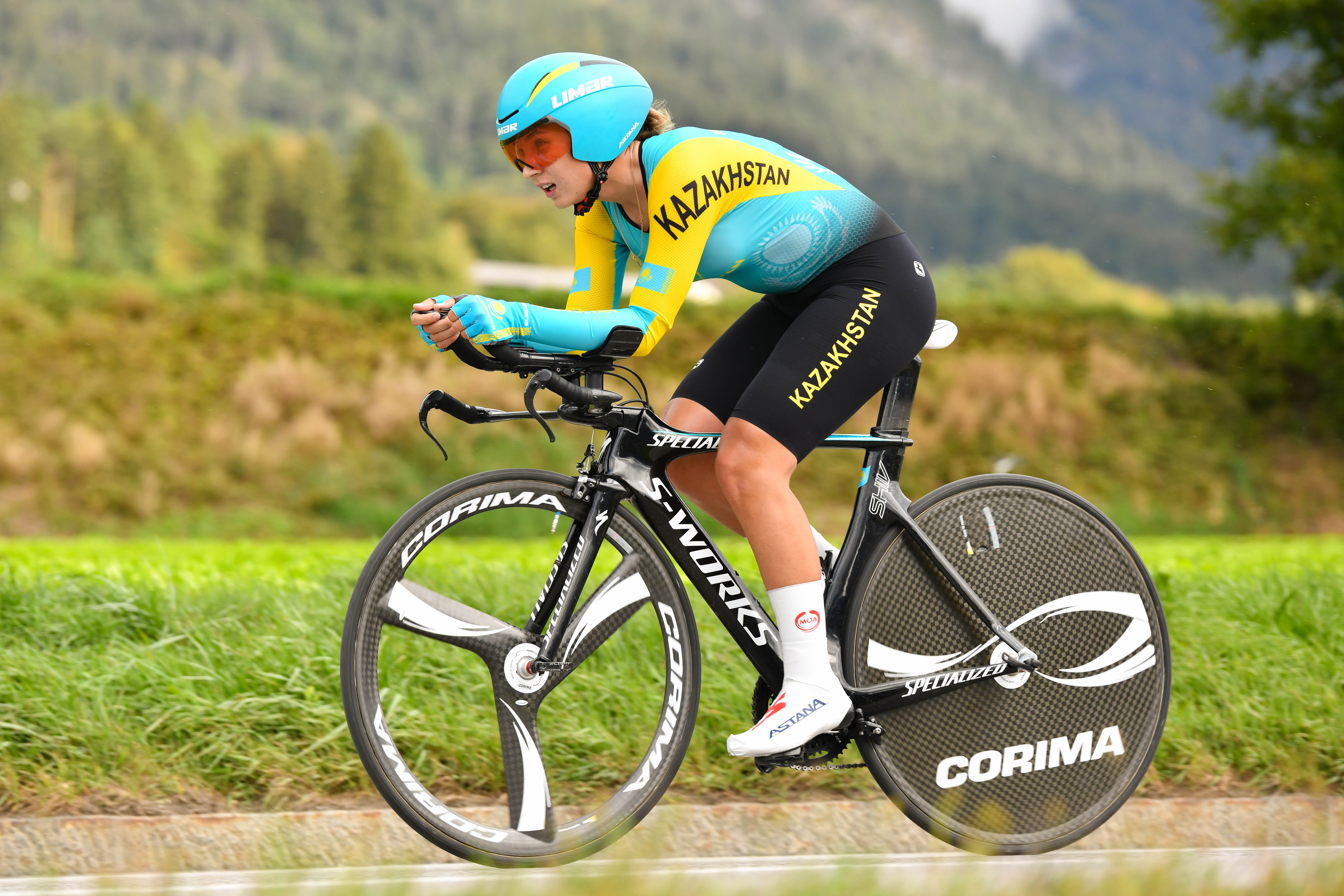

Personal information
- Born: 24 August 2000 (age 26)

Cycling career
- Sport: Cycling
- Discipline: Road
- Role: Rider

Professional team
- 2019: Astana

Marina Kurnossova (born 24 August 2000) is a Kazakhstani professional racing cyclist, who last rode for the UCI Women's Team Astana during the 2019 women's road cycling season.
