= Svetlana Pachshenko =

Kazakhstani cyclist (born 2000)

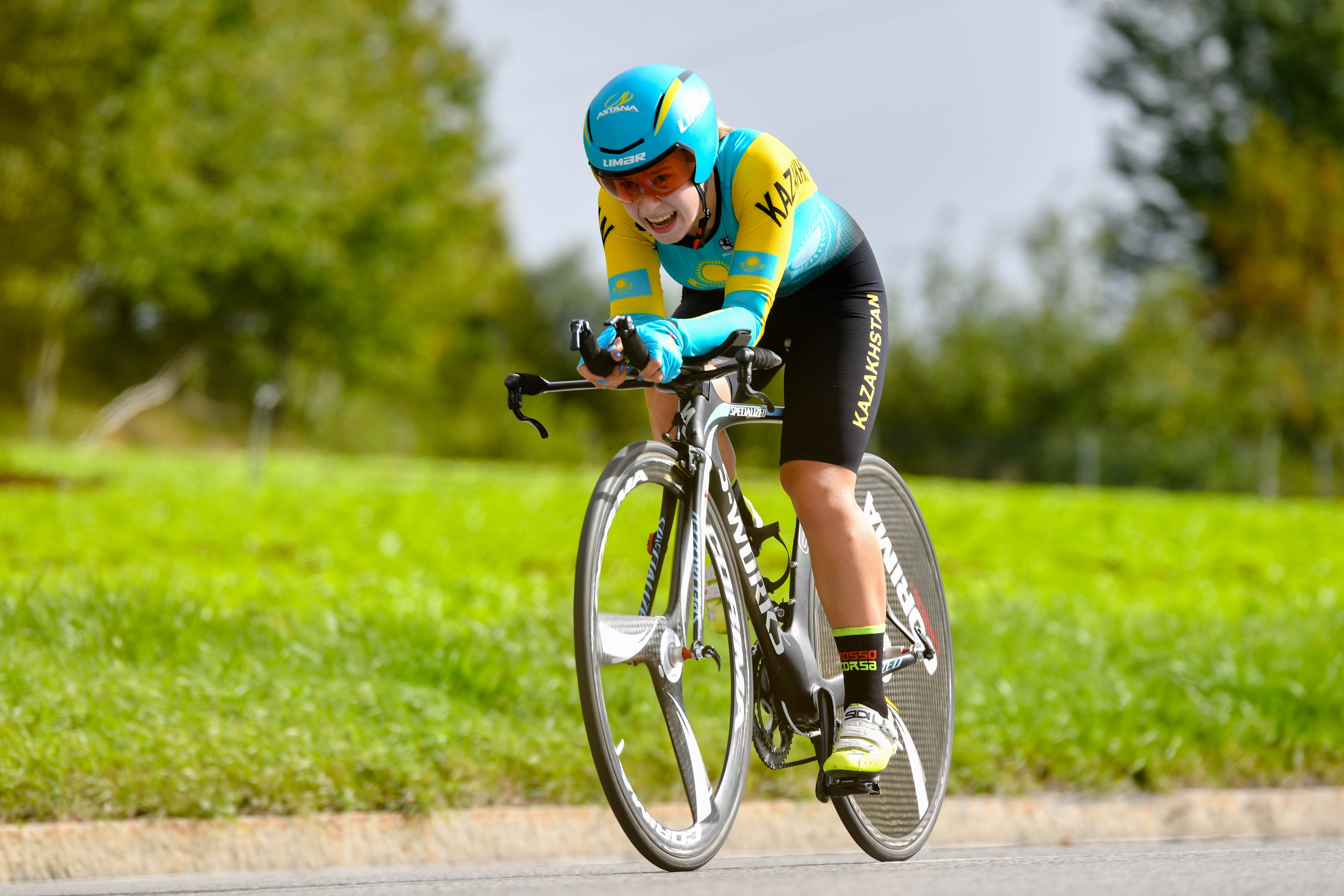
- Pachshenko in 2018

Personal information
- Full name: Svetlana Pachshenko
- Born: 26 July 2000 (age 26)

Cycling career
- Sport: Cycling
- Discipline: Road
- Role: Rider

Professional team
- 2019–2020: Astana
Medal record
Women's track cycling
Representing Kazakhstan
Asian Championships
Silver medal – second place	2022 New Delhi	Team pursuit
Islamic Solidarity Games
Bronze medal – third place	2021 Konya	Points race

Svetlana Pachshenko (born 26 July 2000) is a Kazakhstani professional racing cyclist, who most recently rode for UCI Women's Continental Team Astana.

== Major results ==
2017
3rd Time trial, National Junior Road Championships
2018
1st Youth Olympic Games, Road Race
National Junior Road Championships

1st Time trial
3rd Road Race

2019
National Road Championships

1st Road Race
4th Time trial
