= Sergei Mishchenko =

Kazakhstani footballer

Personal information
- Full name: Sergei Mishchenko
- Date of birth: 19 May 1961 (age 65)
- Place of birth: Soviet Union
- Position: Defender

Senior career*
Years	Team	Apps	(Gls)
1980–1981	Shakhter Karagandy	68	(0)
1982	Kairat	17	(0)
1983–1999	Shakhter Karagandy	484	(2)

International career
1995–1996	Kazakhstan	3	(0)
- * Club domestic league appearances and goals

Sergei Mishchenko (born 19 May 1961) is a retired Kazakh football defender.

Mishchenko spent most of his career playing for FC Shakhter Karagandy. He also played for FC Kairat in the Soviet Top League.

Mishchenko made three appearances for the Kazakhstan national football team from 1995 to 1996.
