= Muaythai at the 2025 World Games – Qualification =

This article details the qualifying phase for Muaythai at the 2025 World Games. The muaythai competition of the 2025 World Games will comprise a total of 48 muaythai practitioners coming from their respective NOCs; each can enter a maximum of three muaythai practitioners, with one in each bodyweight category. However, as the host nation, China has the privilege of entering up to six muaythai practitioners.

The remainder of the total quota will be attributed to the muaythai practitioners through a new universal ranking system. Seven quota places will be awarded to the top-ranked muaythai practitioners in each of the six weight classes (three per gender) through the International Federation of Muaythai Associations (IFMA) Global Rankings.

== IFMA Global Rankings ==
The IFMA Global Rankings reflects an athlete’s position based on points earned exclusively from IFMA official events. The ranking system values all medal performances, not just gold, ensuring every podium finish contributes to an athlete’s ranking. Competitors in larger brackets earn more points, highlighting the importance of tougher competition.

The IFMA Global Rankings system provides a clear structure for ranking athletes. It prioritizes event levels, with the IFMA World Championships carrying the highest score factor. Rankings are determined by medal achievements, number of wins, and event prestige.

== Timeline ==
Event	Factor	Date	Venue
2022 World Games	10	13–17 July 2022	Birmingham, United States
2022 South American Muaythai Championships	2	20–23 October 2022	Montevideo, Uruguay
2022 Antalya International Muaythai Open Cup	4	21–27 November 2022	Antalya, Turkey
2023 Arab Muaythai Championships	4	28 February–5 March 2023	Abu Dhabi, United Arab Emirates
2023 World Muaythai Championships	12	3–13 May 2023	Bangkok, Thailand
2023 European Games	6	22–27 June 2023	Myślenice, Poland
2023 World Combat Games	10	28–30 October 2023	Riyadh, Saudi Arabia
2023 Mediterranean Muaythai Championships	2	2–5 November 2023	Loutraki, Greece
2023 European Muaythai Championships	6	9–14 December 2023	Antalya, Turkey
2024 Nordic Muaythai Championships	2	26–27 January 2024	Stockholm, Sweden
2024 African Muaythai Championships	4	20–25 February 2024	Cairo, Egypt
2024 World Muaythai Championships	12	11–20 September 2024	Patras, Greece
2024 Asian Muaythai Open Cup Invitational	2	17–22 October 2024	Taipei, Chinese Taipei
2024 European Muaythai Championships	6	7–14 November 2024	Pristina, Kosovo
2024 East Asian Muaythai Championships	2	27 November–1 December 2024	Wan Chai, Hong Kong
2024 Antalya International Muaythai Open Cup	4	5–8 December 2024	Antalya, Turkey

== Qualification summary ==
The following table summarizes the qualification outcome for the muaythai tournament at the 2025 World Games.

NOC	Men			Women			Total
NOC	−57 kg	−71 kg	−86 kg	−48 kg	−54 kg	−60 kg	Total
Afghanistan	Yes						1
Armenia	Yes						1
Australia						Yes	1
Austria						Yes	1
Belgium					Yes		1
China	Yes	Yes	Yes	Yes	Yes	Yes	6
Croatia			Yes				1
Estonia						Yes	1
Finland				Yes			1
France	Yes						1
Hungary					Yes		1
Individual Neutral Athletes		Yes				Yes	2
Israel	Yes	Yes					2
Italy		Yes					1
Kazakhstan		Yes					1
Mexico			Yes		Yes		2
Moldova			Yes				1
Morocco		Yes		Yes			2
Poland					Yes	Yes	2
Saudi Arabia				Yes			1
Singapore				Yes			1
Slovakia					Yes		1
South Africa			Yes				1
Sweden			Yes				1
Thailand		Yes		Yes			2
Turkey				Yes	Yes	Yes	3
Ukraine	Yes	Yes		Yes			3
United Arab Emirates	Yes						1
United States			Yes		Yes	Yes	3
Uzbekistan			Yes				1
Vietnam	Yes						1
Total: 31 NOCs	8	8	8	8	8	8	48

== Men's events ==
Quota places are allocated to the respective NOC and not necessarily to the muaythai practitioner achieving the place in the qualification event.

=== −57 kg ===
Event	Places	Qualified athletes
Host nation	1	To be determined (CHN)
IFMA Global Rankings (as of 31 December 2024)	7	Ruach Hashem Bichayanu Gordon (ISR); Dmytro Shelesko (UKR); Daren Rolland (FRA); Mohamed Touizi (UAE); To be determined (VIE); Sayed Rohullah Mosawi (AFG); Narek Khachikyan (ARM)
Total	8	

=== −71 kg ===
Event	Places	Qualified athletes
Host nation	1	To be determined (CHN)
IFMA Global Rankings (as of 31 December 2024)	6	Konstantin Shakhtarin (AIN); Thanet Nitutorn (THA); Oleksandr Yefimenko (UKR); Abdelali Zahidi (MAR); Gianluca Giorgio Franzosi (ITA); Maxim Branis (ISR)
Reallocation	1	Ruslan Zayakin (KAZ)
Total	8	

=== −86 kg ===
Event	Places	Qualified athletes
Host nation	1	To be determined (CHN)
IFMA Global Rankings (as of 31 December 2024)	4	Aaron Ortiz (USA); Vito Košar (CRO); Andreas Lilliecrona (SWE); Damian Collins (RSA)
Reallocation	3	Humoyun Pulatov (UZB); Juan Antonio Hernández Tototmol (MEX); Artiom Livadari (MDA)
Total	8	

== Women's events ==
Quota places are allocated to the respective NOC and not necessarily to the muaythai practitioner achieving the place in the qualification event.

=== −48 kg ===
Event	Places	Qualified athletes
Host nation	1	To be determined (CHN)
IFMA Global Rankings (as of 31 December 2024)	7	Anastasiia Mykhailenko (UKR); Kullanat Aonok (THA); Oumaima Belouarrat (MAR); Jovena Peñol (FIN); Sibel Oruç (TUR); Hattan Alsaif (KSA); Cheryl Gwa Wei Ying (SIN)
Total	8	

=== −54 kg ===
Event	Places	Qualified athletes
Host nation	1	To be determined (CHN)
IFMA Global Rankings (as of 31 December 2024)	7	Laura Burgos (MEX); Martyna Kierczyńska (POL); Megan Washam (USA); Gülistan Turan (TUR); Monika Chochlíková (SVK); Axana Depypere (BEL); Anna Székely (HUN)
Total	8	

=== −60 kg ===
Event	Places	Qualified athletes
Host nation	1	To be determined (CHN)
IFMA Global Rankings (as of 31 December 2024)	7	Kübra Kocakuş (TUR); Tierra Brandt (USA); Adriana Płachta (POL); Stella Hemetsberger (AUT); Marina Bespalova (AIN); Astrid Johanna Grents (EST); Anna Székely (HUN)
Total	8	
