= Israel at the 2018 Summer Youth Olympics =

- IOC code: ISR
- NOC: Olympic Committee of Israel
- Website: www.olympicsil.co.il (in Hebrew and English)

in Buenos Aires
- Competitors: 19 in 8 sports
- Flag bearer: Avishag Semberg
- Medals Ranked 52nd: Gold 1 Silver 1 Bronze 1 Total 3

Summer Youth Olympics appearances (overview)
- 2010; 2014; 2018; 2026

Israel competed at the 2018 Summer Youth Olympics, in Buenos Aires, Argentina from 6 October to 18 October 2018.

== Medalists ==
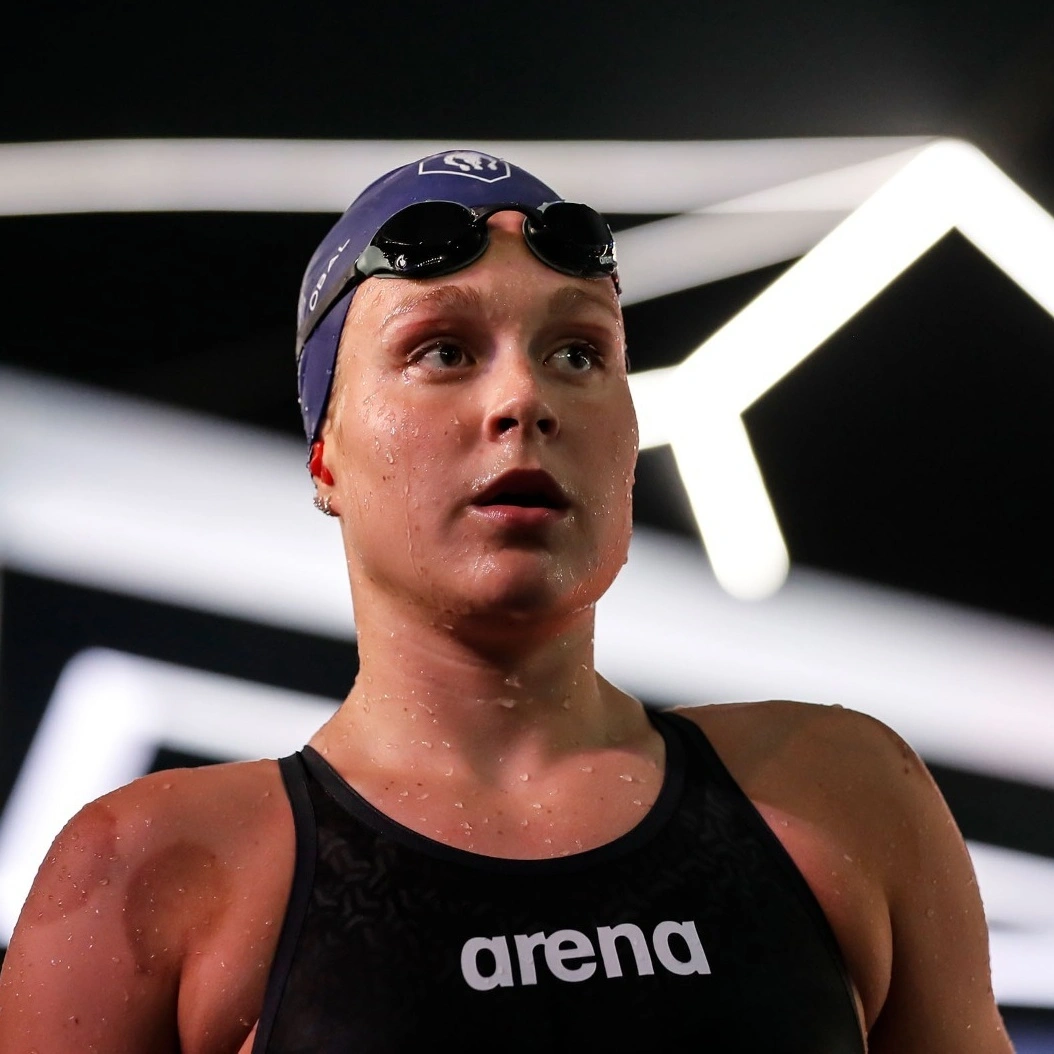
Anastasya Gorbenko, 2021

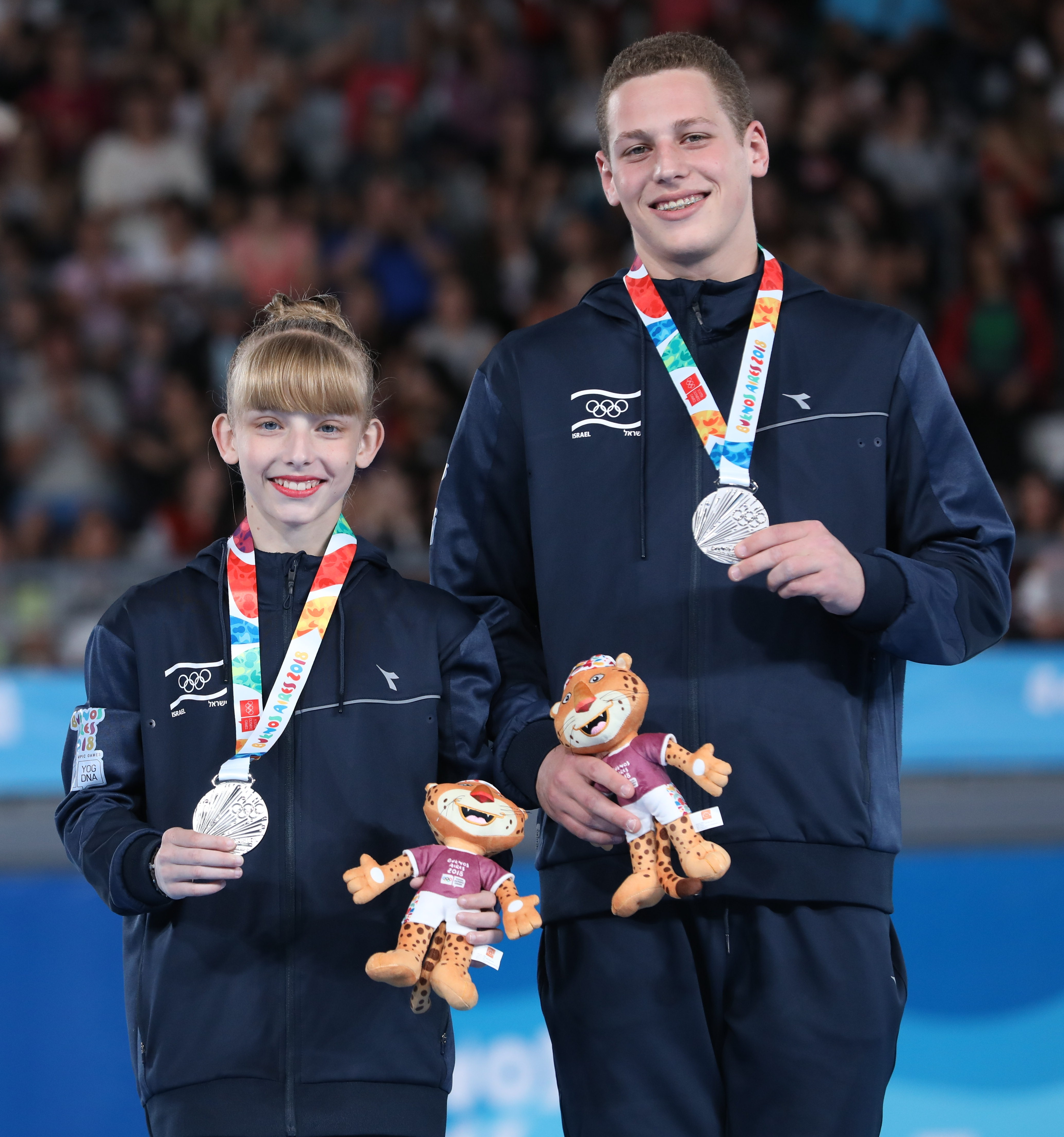
Noa Kazado Yakar and Yonatan Fridman during the victory ceremony

Medal	Name	Sport	Event	Date
Gold	Anastasia Gorbenko	Swimming	200 m individual medley	7 Oct
Silver	Yonatan Fridman; Noa Kazado Yakar	Gymnastics	Acrobatic mixed pairs	15 Oct
Bronze	Denis Loktev	Swimming	200 m freestyle	8 Oct

== Athletics ==
Israel qualified three athletes.

Boys
Track & road events

Athlete	Event	Stage 1		Stage 2		Total	
Athlete	Event	Result	Rank	Result	Rank	Total	Rank
Adisu Guadia	3000 m	8:30.27	11	12:06	7	—N/a	9
Adisu Guadia	cross country	—N/a		12:06	18	12:06	18

Field Events

Athlete	Event	Stage 1		Stage 2		Total	
Athlete	Event	Distance	Rank	Distance	Rank	Total	Rank
Amal Hasanov	Pole vault	4.45	13	4.62	14	9.07	12

Girls
Field Events

Athlete	Event	Stage 1		Stage 2		Total	
Athlete	Event	Distance	Rank	Distance	Rank	Total	Rank
Veronika Chaynov	High jump	1.74	9	1.79	7	3.53	7

== Cycling ==
The ranks of the Israelis cyclists at the 2017 men junior XCO mountain bike world championships place Israel at the 7th place. This position qualified two cyclists for Israel.

Team

Athletes	Event	Cross-Country Eliminator		Time Trial			Criterium		Cross-Country Short Circuit			Road Race			Total Pts	Rank
Athletes	Event	Rank	Points	Time	Rank	Points	Rank	Points	Time	Rank	Points	Time	Rank	Points	Total Pts	Rank
Eitan Levi; Nadav Raisberg	Boys' Team	3; 15	65; 2	8:59.95	12	6	15; 20	2; 0	19:42 -1 LAP	8; 19	20; 0	1:31:03; 1:31:03	22; 11	0; 8	103	9

== Gymnastics ==
=== Acrobatic ===
Israel qualified a mixed pair based on its performance at the 2018 Acrobatic Gymnastics World Championship.

Pairs

Athlete	Event	Qualification								Final	
Athlete	Event	Dynamic		Balance		Combined		Total	Rank	Total	Rank
Athlete	Event	Total	Rank	Total	Rank	Total	Rank	Total	Rank	Total	Rank
Yonatan Fridman; Noa Kazado Yakar	Mixed pairs	26.930	4	27.750	2	27.390	3	82.070	1 Q	27.590	2nd place, silver medalist(s)

=== Artistic ===
Israel qualified one gymnast based on Uri Zeiadel performance at the European qualification event as part of the 2018 European Junior Championship. Zeiadel finish at the 23rd place on the individual all-around event with 73.265 points. This score place Israel at the 15th place.

Boys

Athlete	Event	Apparatus												Total	Rank
Athlete	Event	Floor		Pommel horse		Rings		Vault		Parallel bars		Horizontal bar		Total	Rank
Athlete	Event	Total	Rank	Total	Rank	Total	Rank	Total	Rank	Total	Rank	Total	Rank	Total	Rank
Uri Zeiadel	Qualification	12.166	26	6.633	35	11.266	33	10.166	34	13.200	12	10.925	30	64.356	34

=== Rhythmic ===
Israel qualified one rhythmic gymnast based on Valeriia Sotskova performance at the European qualification event. Sotskova finish at the 5th place on the individual all-around event.

Individual

Athlete	Event	Qualification						Final					
Athlete	Event	Hoop	Ball	Clubs	Ribbon	Total	Rank	Hoop	Ball	Clubs	Ribbon	Total	Rank
Valeriia Sotskova	Individual	16.350	15.150	15.350	14.950	61.800	4 Q	16.150	14.550	15.700	14.400	60.800	7

== Judo ==
Israel qualified one athlete based on its position at the IJF cadet WRL.

Individual

Athlete	Event	Round of 16	Quarterfinals	Semifinals	Repechage		Final / BM	Rank
Athlete	Event	Round of 16	Quarterfinals	Semifinals	Quarterfinals	Semifinals	Final / BM	Rank
Athlete	Event	Opposition Result	Opposition Result	Opposition Result	Opposition Result	Opposition Result	Opposition Result	Rank
Ariel Shulman	Boys' -55 kg	Veredyba (UKR); L 0-10	Did not advance		Montealegre (COL); W 10-0	Garboa (ECU); W 10-0	Leutgeb (AUT); L 0-10	5

Team

Athletes	Event	Round of 16		Quarterfinals		Semifinals		Final		Rank
Athletes	Event	Personal	Team	Personal	Team	Personal	Team	Personal	Team	Rank
Athletes	Event	Opposition Result	Opposition Result	Opposition Result	Opposition Result	Opposition Result	Opposition Result	Opposition Result	Opposition Result	Rank
Los Angeles; Soniya Bhatta (NEP); Nahomys Acosta Batte (CUB); Saskia Brothers (AUS); Raffaela Igl (GER); Ariel Shulman (ISR); Georgios Balarjishvili (CYP); Turpal Djoukaev (FIN); Alin Bagrin (MDA)	Mixed Team	Israelyan (ARM); W 10-00	Seoul; W 5-3	Montealegre (COL); L 00-10s1	Athens; L 3-5	Did not advance				5

== Sailing ==
Israel qualified two boats based on its performance at the 2017 World Techno 293+ Championships. Naama Gazit finished at the 4th place and earned one quota places for the Israeli delegation in the girls’ event. Bar Navri finished at the 9th place and earned one quota places for the Israeli delegation in the boys’ event.

Athlete	Event	Race													Total score	Net score	Rank
Athlete	Event	1	2	3	4	5	6	7	8	9	10	11	12	M*	Total score	Net score	Rank
Tomer Vardimon	Boys' Techno 293+	~~BFD (25)~~	6	3	3	Cancelled	5	12	7	3	5	3	7	2	81	56	4
Naama Gazit	Girls' Techno 293+	5	5	4	2	Cancelled	5	7	4	2	4	3	~~16~~	6	63	47	4

== Swimming ==
Israel qualified four athlete based on its performance at the 17th FINA World Championships in Budapest.

Boys

Athlete	Events	Heat		Semifinal		Final	
Athlete	Events	Time	Position	Time	Position	Time	Position
Denis Loktev	100 m freestyle	50.91	11	50.81	13	Did not advance	
Denis Loktev	200 m freestyle	1:49.20	5	—N/a		1:48.53	3rd place, bronze medalist(s)
Denis Loktev	400 m freestyle	3:52.04	4	—N/a		3:52.12	6
Gal Cohen Groumi	50 m butterfly	25.20	26	Did not advance			
Gal Cohen Groumi	100 m butterfly	55.22	24	Did not advance			
Gal Cohen Groumi	50 m freestyle	23.97	27	Did not advance			
Gal Cohen Groumi	200 m individual medley	2:04.25	3	—N/a		2:02.41	4

Girls

Athlete	Events	Heat		Semifinal		Final	
Athlete	Events	Time	Position	Time	Position	Time	Position
Anastasia Gorbenko	100 m freestyle	56.33	8	56.21	8	55.88	7
Anastasia Gorbenko	200 m backstroke	2:14.24	9	—N/a		Did not advance	
Anastasia Gorbenko	200 m individual medley	2:14.74	1	—N/a		2:12.88 NR	1st place, gold medalist(s)
Anastasia Gorbenko	200 m breaststroke	2:33.13	17	—N/a		Did not advance	
Lea Polonsky	100 m butterfly	1:02.56	20	Did not advance			
Lea Polonsky	200 m butterfly	2:20.58	11	—N/a		Did not advance	
Lea Polonsky	200 m individual medley	2:21.16	21	—N/a		Did not advance	
Lea Polonsky	100 m breaststroke	1:12.69	33	Did not advance			

Mixed

Athlete	Event	Heat		Final	
Athlete	Event	Time	Position	Time	Position
Denis Loktev; Gal Cohen Groumi; Anastasia Gorbenko; Lea Polonsky	4 × 100 m freestyle relay	3:33.57	2	DSQ	8
Denis Loktev; Gal Cohen Groumi; Anastasia Gorbenko; Lea Polonsky	4 × 100 m medley relay	3:59.68	13	Did not advance	

== Taekwondo ==
The 2018 World Youth Championship in Taekwondo took place in April in Tunisia. In contrast to the Olympic Charter, Israeli athletes were prevented from entering Tunisia and their ability to achieve the Olympic criterion was impaired. In light of this, and after the demand of the Olympic Committee of Israel, two Israeli athletes Avishag Semberg and Tom Pashcovsky received a free ticket to the Youth Olympics. But eventually, Daniel Goichman received the free ticket in Pashcovsky's place.

Boys

Athlete	Event	Preliminary round	Quarterfinal	Semifinal	Final	Rank
Daniel Goichman	-55 kg	Kim (KOR); L 11 - 33	Did not advance			9

Girls

Athlete	Event	Preliminary round	Quarterfinal	Semifinal	Final	Rank
Avishag Semberg	-49 kg	Sompan (THA); W 17 - 8	Cao (CHN); L 9 - 15	Did not advance		5

== Triathlon ==
Itamar Levanon finished at the 8th place with a total time of 55:44 minutes at the 2018 European Youth Olympic Games Qualifier held in Banyoles, Spain. Israel qualified one athlete based on Levanon's performance.

Individual

Athlete	Event	Swim (750m)	Trans 1	Bike (20km)	Trans 2	Run (5km)	Total Time	Rank
Itamar Levanon	Boys	10:29	0:28	28:51	0:28	16:36	56:52	15

Relay

Athlete	Event	Total Times per Athlete (Swim 250/300m, Bike 5/8km, Run 1.5/2km)	Total Group Time	Rank
Europe 5 Chiara Lobba (ITA); Loic Triponez (SUI); Alevtina Stetsenko (RUS); Itamar Levanon (ISR)	Mixed Team Relay	24:00; 21:54; 24:26; 21:28	1:31:48	8
