= Kickboxing at the 2025 World Games – Women's K1 style 52 kg =

Women's K1 style 52 kg at the 2025 World Games
- Venue: Sichuan Provincial Gymnasium
- Location: Chengdu, China
- Dates: 12–14 August 2025
- Competitors: 8 from 8 nations

Medalists
gold medal	Yulia Sachkov	Israel
silver medal	Klára Strnadová	Czech Republic
bronze medal	Daryna Ivanova	Ukraine

The women's K1 style 52 kg competition in kickboxing at the 2025 World Games took place from 12 to 14 August 2025 at the Sichuan Provincial Gymnasium in Chengdu, China.

== Competition format ==
A total of 8 athletes entered the competition. They fought in the cup system.

== Results ==
Quarterfinals
Yulia Sachkov (ISR)	3
Meriem El Moubarik (MAR)	0
Geng Chunlei (CHN)	0
Daryna Ivanova (UKR)	3
Feyzanur Azizoğlu (TUR)	3
Triệu Thị Phương Thúy (VIE)	0
Suellen Bitencourt (BRA)	0
Klára Strnadová (CZE)	3

Semifinals
Yulia Sachkov (ISR)	3
Daryna Ivanova (UKR)	0
Feyzanur Azizoğlu (TUR)	0
Klára Strnadová (CZE)	3

Final
Yulia Sachkov (ISR)	3
Klára Strnadová (CZE)	0

Third place
Daryna Ivanova (UKR)	3
Feyzanur Azizoğlu (TUR)	0
