= Israel at the 2025 World Games =

- IOC code: ISR
- NOC: Israel Federation of Non-Olympic Sport

in Chengdu, China 7 August 2025 – 17 August 2025
- Competitors: 32 (15 men and 17 women) in 8 sports
- Medals Ranked 13th: Gold 6 Silver 4 Bronze 4 Total 14

World Games appearances
- 2005; 2009; 2013; 2017; 2022; 2025

Israel competed at the 2025 World Games held in Chengdu, China from 7 to 17 August 2025. Israeli athletes participated in eight sports.

== Medalists ==
| Medal | Name | Sport | Event | Date |
|---|---|---|---|---|
| Gold | Or Abraham; Rotem Amihai; Lior Borodin; Tomer Offir | Acrobatic gymnastics | Men's groups | 10 August |
| Gold | Nimrod Ryeder | Ju-jitsu | Men's ne-waza –77 kg | 11 August |
| Gold | Nimrod Ryeder | Ju-jitsu | Men's ne-waza open | 12 August |
| Gold | Shaked Nisimian | Sambo | Women's –72 kg | 13 August |
| Gold | Yulia Sachkov | Kickboxing | Women's K1 Style –52 kg | 14 August |
| Gold | Osaid Jodah | Kickboxing | Men's K1 Style –75 kg | 14 August |
| Silver | Meshy Rosenfeld | Ju-jitsu | Women's ne-waza –63 kg | 10 August |
| Silver | Ruach Gordon | Muaythai | Men's 57 kg | 10 August |
| Silver | Meshy Rosenfeld | Ju-jitsu | Women's ne-waza open | 12 August |
| Silver | Polina Grossman | Kickboxing | Women's K1 Style –70 kg | 14 August |
| Bronze | Yonatan Fridman; Amy Refaeli | Acrobatic gymnastics | Mixed pair | 8 August |
| Bronze | Nikol Aleinik; Lia Bar noy Michal Stratievsky | Acrobatic gymnastics | Women's group | 9 August |
| Bronze | Pnina Aronov | Ju-jitsu | Women's ne-waza –52 kg | 10 August |
| Bronze | Nili Block | Sambo | Women's –65 kg | 13 August |

== Competitors ==
The following is the list of number of competitors in the Games.

| Sport | Men | Women | Total |
|---|---|---|---|
| Acrobatic gymnastics | 5 | 6 | 11 |
| Archery | 1 | 0 | 1 |
| Dancesport | 4 | 4 | 8 |
| Ju-jitsu | 2 | 2 | 4 |
| Kickboxing | 1 | 2 | 3 |
| Muaythai | 2 | 0 | 2 |
| Sambo | 0 | 2 | 2 |
| Wakeboarding | 0 | 1 | 1 |
| Total | 15 | 17 | 32 |

== Acrobatic gymnastics ==
| Athletes | Event | Qualification | | | | | | Final | |
| Athletes | Event | Balance exercise | | Dynamic exercise | | Total | | Final exercise | |
| Athletes | Event | Result | Rank | Result | Rank | Result | Rank | Result | Rank |
|---|---|---|---|---|---|---|---|---|---|
| Or Abraham; Rotem Amihai; Lior Borodin; Tomer Offir | Men's groups | 28.530 | 3 | 28.570 | 2 | 57.100 | 2 Q | 29.890 | 1st place, gold medalist(s) |
| Rony Cohen; Maya Velner | Women's pairs | 26.150 | 4 | 25.210 | 5 | 51.360 | 5 | Did not advance | |
| Nikol Aleinik; Lia Bar noy Michal Stratievsky | Women's group | 28.580 | 2 | 28.120 | 2 | 56.700 | 2 Q | 28.480 | 3rd place, bronze medalist(s) |
| Amy Refaeli; Yonatan Fridman | Mixed pairs | 28.110 | 2 | 27.490 | 3 | 55.600 | 3 Q | 28.250 | 3rd place, bronze medalist(s) |

== Archery ==
| Athlete | Event | Qualification | | Round of 32 | Round of 16 | Quarterfinals | Semifinal | Final / BM | |
| Athlete | Event | Score | Rank | Opposition Result | Opposition Result | Opposition Result | Opposition Result | Opposition Result | Rank |
|---|---|---|---|---|---|---|---|---|---|
| Shamai Yamrom | Men's Compound | 709 | 9 | Lu (CHN); W 146–142 | Bosansky (SVK); W 146–144 | Schloesser (NED); L 147–147* | Did not advance | | 5 |

== Dancesport ==
Latin

| Athletes | Event | First round | | | | | | | Semifinals | | | | | | | Finals | | | | | | |
| Athletes | Event | S | CC | R | PD | J | Total points | Rank | S | CC | R | PD | J | Total points | Rank | S | CC | R | PD | J | Total points | Rank |
|---|---|---|---|---|---|---|---|---|---|---|---|---|---|---|---|---|---|---|---|---|---|---|
| Alexey Korobchenko; Liana Odikadze | Latin | 34.00 | 33.75 | 33.83 | 34.33 | 34.00 | 169.92 | 12 Q | 34.25 | 34.25 | 34.25 | 34.08 | 34.50 | 171.33 | 11 | Did not advance | | | | | | |
| Tomer Zveniatsky; Elizabeta Pustornakova | Latin | 33.50 | 33.75 | 34.08 | 34.08 | 34.25 | 169.67 | 13 Q | 33.92 | 34.00 | 34.25 | 34.00 | 33.92 | 170.08 | 12 | Did not advance | | | | | | |

Standard

| Athletes | Event | First round | | | | | | | Semifinals | | | | | | | Finals | | | | | | |
| Athletes | Event | W | T | VW | SF | QS | Total points | Rank | W | T | VW | SF | QS | Total points | Rank | W | T | VW | SF | QS | Total points | Rank |
|---|---|---|---|---|---|---|---|---|---|---|---|---|---|---|---|---|---|---|---|---|---|---|
| Vladislav Kozhevnikov; Eleonora Metelitsa | Standard | 34.42 | 34.50 | 34.33 | 34.58 | 34.33 | 172.16 | 10 Q | 34.50 | 34.58 | 34.50 | 34.67 | 34.75 | 173.00 | 9 | Did not advance | | | | | | |
| Mark Ziv; Marika Odikadze | Standard | 33.17 | 33.42 | 33.00 | 33.08 | 33.00 | 165.67 | 20 | Did not advance | | | | | | | | | | | | | |

== Ju-jitsu ==
| Athlete | Event | Elimination round | | | Round of 16 | Quarterfinals | Semifinal | Final / BM | |
| Athlete | Event | Opposition Result | Opposition Result | Rank | Opposition Result | Opposition Result | Opposition Result | Opposition Result | Rank |
|---|---|---|---|---|---|---|---|---|---|
| Nimrod Ryeder | Men's ne-waza –77 kg | Ahmed (NOR); W 50–0 | Sheehan (CAN); W 8–0 | 1 Q | Bye | | Bolatbek (KAZ); W 0*–0 | Alawlaqi (UAE); W 50–0 | 1st place, gold medalist(s) |
| Saar Shemesh | Men's ne-waza –85 kg | Alkubaisi (UAE); L 0–50 | Nada (KSA); L 0–3 | 3 | Bye | | Did not advance | | 5 |
| Pnina Aronov | Women's ne-waza –52 kg | Brodski (GER); W 2–0 | Cruz (COL); W 2–0 | 1 Q | Bye | | Napolis (PHI); L 0–0* | Brodski (GER); W 2–0 | 3rd place, bronze medalist(s) |
| Meshy Rosenfeld | Women's ne-waza –63 kg | Vintalas (SUI); W 9–0 | Alkalbani (UAE); W 7–0 | 1 Q | Bye | | Faure (FRA); W 5–3 | Sung (KOR); L 0–50 | 2nd place, silver medalist(s) |
| Nimrod Ryeder | Men's ne-waza open | Bye | | | Choijamts (MGL); W 50–0 | Alkubaisi (UAE); W 5–2 | Joo (KOR); W 50–0 | Dossantos (CAN); W 2–0 | 1st place, gold medalist(s) |
| Saar Shemesh | Men's ne-waza open | Bye | | | Bolatbek (KAZ); L 0–50 | Did not advance | | | 9 |
| Pnina Aronov | Women's ne-waza open | Bye | | | Vintalas (SUI); W 4–0 | Toros (HUN); L 0–50 | Did not advance | | 5 |
| Meshy Rosenfeld | Women's ne-waza open | Bye | | | Faure (FRA); W 2*–2 | Alkalbani (UAE); W 2–0 | Toth (HUN); W 2*–2 | Toros (HUN); L 0–50 | 2nd place, silver medalist(s) |

== Kickboxing ==
| Athlete | Event | Quarterfinal | Semifinal | Final / BM | |
| Athlete | Event | Opposition Result | Opposition Result | Opposition Result | Rank |
|---|---|---|---|---|---|
| Osaid Jodah | Men's K1 Style –75 kg | Ed-Dyouri (MAR); W 3–0 | Schleicher (USA); W 3–0 | Stoyanov (BUL); W 3–0 | 1st place, gold medalist(s) |
| Yulia Sachkov | Women's K1 Style –52 kg | Elmoubarik (MAR); W 3–0 | Ivanova (UKR); W 3–0 | Strnadova (CZE); W 3–0 | 1st place, gold medalist(s) |
| Polina Grossman | Women's K1 Style –70 kg | Rosin (NZL); W 3–0 | Krstic (SRB); W 3–0 | Dias (POR); L 1–2 | 2nd place, silver medalist(s) |

== Muaythai ==
| Athlete | Event | Quarterfinal | Semifinal | Final / BM | |
| Athlete | Event | Opposition Result | Opposition Result | Opposition Result | Rank |
|---|---|---|---|---|---|
| Ruach Gordon | Men's 57 kg | Khachikyan (ARM); W RSCH | Rolland (FRA); W 30–27 | Shelesko (UKR); L 27–30 | 2nd place, silver medalist(s) |
| Maxim Branis | Men's 71 kg | Shakhtarin (AIN); L 27–30 | Did not advance | | =5 |

== Sambo ==
| Athlete | Event | Quarterfinal | Semifinal | Final / BM | |
| Athlete | Event | Opposition Result | Opposition Result | Opposition Result | Rank |
|---|---|---|---|---|---|
| Nili Block | Women's –65 kg | Mandar (MAR); W 2–0 WO | Istomina (AIN); L 0–8 | Akzhigitova (KAZ); W 0–0 WO | 3rd place, bronze medalist(s) |
| Shaked Nisimian | Women's –72 kg | Castillo Barranco (MEX); W 9–0 | Kenessary (KAZ); W 2*–2 | Uran-Ölziin (MGL); W 5–0 | 1st place, gold medalist(s) |

== Wakeboarding ==
| Athlete | Event | Heat | | Last chance | | Semifinal | | Final | |
| Athlete | Event | Result | Rank | Result | Rank | Result | Rank | Result | Rank |
|---|---|---|---|---|---|---|---|---|---|
| Liza Pruzhanskaia | Women's cable wakeboard | 48.20 | 2 Q | Bye | | 52.60 | 3 Q | 72.00 | 4 |
