= Kickboxing at the 2025 World Games – Women's K1 style 70 kg =

Women's K1 style 70 kg at the 2025 World Games
- Venue: Sichuan Provincial Gymnasium
- Location: Chengdu, China
- Dates: 12–14 August 2025
- Competitors: 8 from 8 nations

Medalists
gold medal	Catarina Dias	Portugal
silver medal	Polina Grossman	Israel
bronze medal	Aleksandra Krstić	Serbia

The women's K1 style 70 kg competition in kickboxing at the 2025 World Games will take place from 12 to 14 August 2025 at the Sichuan Provincial Gymnasium in Chengdu, China.

== Competition format ==
A total of 8 athletes entered the competition. They fought in the cup system.

== Results ==
Quarterfinals
Polina Grossman (ISR)	3
Leonie Rosin (NZL)	0
Ekram Abouelkomosan (EGY)	0
Aleksandra Krstić (SRB)	3
Valentina Keri (HUN)	0
Hergie Bacyadan (PHI)	3
Carolina Sousa Santos (BRA)	0
Catarina Dias (POR)	3

Semifinals
Polina Grossman (ISR)	3
Aleksandra Krstić (SRB)	0
Hergie Bacyadan (PHI)	1
Catarina Dias (POR)	2

Final
Polina Grossman (ISR)	1
Catarina Dias (POR)	2

Third place
Aleksandra Krstić (SRB)	2
Hergie Bacyadan (PHI)	1
