= Muaythai at the 2025 World Games – Men's 57 kg =

World Games muaythai event

Men's 57 kg at the 2025 World Games
- Muaythai pictogram
- Venue: Sichuan Provincial Gymnasium
- Dates: 8–10 August 2025
- Competitors: 8 from 8 nations

Medalists
1st place, gold medalist(s)		Dmytro Shelesko	Ukraine
2nd place, silver medalist(s)		Ruach Gordon	Israel
3rd place, bronze medalist(s)		Daren Rolland	France

The men's 57 kg muaythai (Note: Muaythai is the official name of Muay Thai, recognized by International World Games Association and International Olympic Committee.) event at the 2025 World Games will be held from 8 to 10 August 2025 at the Sichuan Provincial Gymnasium. 8 Muay Thai practitioners from 8 nations participated in the event.

== Competition schedule ==
All times are in local time (UTC+8), according to the official schedule.

Date	Time	Event
8 August 2025	14:00	Quarterfinals
9 August 2025	18:30	Semifinals
10 August 2025	18:15	Bronze medal match
10 August 2025	19:45	Gold medal match

== Results ==
=== Legend ===
- RET — Won by Retirement
- RSC-H — Won by Referee Stopping Contest - Hard Head Blows
- WO — Won by Walkover

=== Bracket ===
Quarterfinals
Dmytro Shelesko (UKR)	29
Sayed Rohullah Mosawi (AFG)	28
Nguyễn Trần Duy Nhất (VIE)	30
Yang Yuxi (CHN)	27
Narek Khachikyan (ARM)
Ruach Gordon (ISR)	RSCH
Daren Rolland (FRA)	30
Mohames Touizi (UAE)	27

Semifinals
Dmytro Shelesko (UKR)	29
Nguyễn Trần Duy Nhất (VIE)	28
Ruach Gordon (ISR)	30
Daren Rolland (FRA)	27

Gold medal bout
Dmytro Shelesko (UKR)	30
Ruach Gordon (ISR)	27
Bronze medal bout
Nguyễn Trần Duy Nhất (VIE)	27
Daren Rolland (FRA)	30
