= Klára Strnadová =

Czech kickboxer

- Born: 10 April 1995 (age 31); Klatovy, Czech Republic
- Height: 1.66 m (5 ft 5 1/2 in)
- Weight: 52 kg (115 lb; 8 st 3 lb)
- Style: Kickboxing, Muay Thai
- Stance: Orthodox
- Fighting out of: Prague, Czech Republic
- Team: Yaksha Gym Plzeň (2016-2019); SK Atom Fighters Plzeň (2020); TKBC Praha (2021-present)
- Trainer: Zdeňkem Švamberkem
- Years active: 2022–present

Kickboxing record
- Total: 22
- Wins: 16
- Losses: 6

Klára Strnadová (born June 26, 2000) is a Czech professional muay thai kickboxer. As of April 2024, she is the #9 ranked women's strawweight kickboxer in the world according to Beyond Kickboxing.

== Professional career ==
Strnadová faced Ermira Rexhmati at "I Am A Fighter 4" on April 17, 2024. She won the fight by a first-round technical knockout. The pair fought a rematch at "I Am A Fighter 6" on November 5, 2022. Strnadová won the fight by unanimous decision.

Strnadová faced Adriana Vrbová at Hanuman Cup 45 on February 11, 2023. She won the fight by unanimous decision.

Strnadová challenged Ines Correia for the WAKO-Pro European Flyweight (-50 kg) K-1 title at Lucerna Boxing 15 on December 30, 2023. She captured her first professional title by unanimous decision.

== Championships and accomplishments ==
=== Professional ===
- World Association of Kickboxing Organizations
  - 2023 WAKO-Pro World K-1 Flyweight (-50 kg) Championship

=== Amateur ===
- World Association of Kickboxing Organizations
  - (silver) 2025 WAKO 1st Thailand Kickboxing World Cup K-1 (-52 kg)
  - (silver) 2024 WAKO European Championship K-1 (-52 kg)
  - (gold) 2024 WAKO Italian Kickboxing World Cup K-1 (-52 kg)
  - (gold) 2023 WAKO World Championship K-1 (-52 kg)
  - (gold) 2023 WAKO Italian Kickboxing World Cup K-1 (-52 kg)
  - (gold) 2023 WAKO Austrian Classics Kickboxing World Cup K-1 (-52 kg)
  - (gold) 2022 Hungarian Kickboxing World Cup K-1 (-52 kg)
  - (gold) 2022 Karlovac Open European Cup K-1 (-52 kg)
  - (gold) 2021 WAKO Hungarian Kickboxing World Cup K-1 (-52 kg)
  - (gold) 2021 Karlovac Open European Cup K-1 (-52 kg)
  - (silver) 2019 WAKO World Championship K-1 (-48 kg)
  - (silver) 2019 K-1 World Grand Prix (-52 kg)
  - (gold) 2019 Austrian Classics Full Contact (-48 kg)
  - (bronze) 2018 WAKO European Championship K-1 (-48 kg)
- World Games
  - (silver) 2025 World Games K-1 (-52 kg)

== Fight record ==
Kickboxing record
16 Wins, 6 Losses, 0 Draws
Date	Result	Opponent	Event	Location	Method	Round	Time
2026-02-28	Win	(Switzerland) Marine Nicol	Boss-Art Championship 13	Baar, Switzerland	Decision	5	3:00
Defends the BAC Featherweight title.
2025-10-18	Win	(Slovakia) Zuzana Smiscikova	Enfusion #153	Prague, Czech Republic	Decision (Unanimous)	3	3:00
2024-08-18	Win	(Thailand) Chabapri	Black Shark Fight, Samui International Stadium	Ko Samui, Thailand	TKO		
2024-04-27	Win	(Switzerland) Malaika Hodapp	Boss-Art Championship 10	Baar, Switzerland	Decision	3	3:00
2023-12-30	Win	(Portugal) Ines Correia	Lucerna Boxing 15	Prague, Czech Republic	Decision (Unanimous)	5	3:00
Wins the WAKO-Pro K-1 European Flyweight (-50 kg) title.
2023-02-11	Win	(Slovakia) Adriana Vrbová	Hanuman Cup 45	Bratislava, Slovakia	Decision (Unanimous)	5	3:00
2022-11-05	Win	(Albania) Ermira Rexhmati	IAF 6	Prague, Czech Republic	Decision (Unanimous)	3	3:00
2022-10-22	Loss	(Spain) Flores Pertegas	Night of the Rebels	Hückelhoven, Germany	Decision	3	3:00
2022-04-17	Win	(Albania) Ermira Rexhmati	IAF 4	Prague, Czech Republic	TKO (Doctor stoppage)	1	
2021-07-11	Loss	(Slovakia) Monika Chochlíková	DFN 4 Superfight / MT Rules	Banská Bystrica, Slovakia	Decision	3	3:00
2021-02-27	Win	(Czech Republic) Viktorie Bulínová	Oktagon Underground	Prague, Czech Republic	Decision (majority)	3	3:00
Legend: Win Loss Draw/No contest Notes

Amateur Kickboxing Record
Date	Result	Opponent	Event	Location	Method	Round	Time
2025-11-28	Loss	(Israel) Yulia Sachkov	2025 WAKO World Championship, Final	Abu Dhabi, UAE	Decision (3:0)	3	2:00
Wins the 2025 WAKO World Championship K-1 -52 kg Silver Medal.
2025-11-27	Win	(Portugal) Catia Batista	2025 WAKO World Championship, Semifinals	Abu Dhabi, UAE	Decision (3:0)	3	2:00
2025-11-26	Win	(Italy) Chiara Pagliuca	2025 WAKO World Championship, Quarterfinals	Abu Dhabi, UAE	Decision (3:0)	3	2:00
2025-08-14	Loss	(Israel) Yulia Sachkov	2025 World Games - K-1 Tournament, Final	Chengdu, China	Decision (3:0)	3	2:00
Wins the 2025 World Games K-1 (-52 kg) Silver Medal.
2025-08-13	Win	(Turkey) Feyzanur Azizoglu	2025 World Games - K-1 Tournament, Semifinals	Chengdu, China	Decision (3:0)	3	2:00
2025-08-12	Win	(Brazil) Suellen Bitencourt	2025 World Games - K-1 Tournament, Quarterfinals	Chengdu, China	Decision (3:0)	3	2:00
2025-04-12	Loss	(Israel) Yulia Sachkov	WAKO 1st Thailand Kickboxing World Cup, Final	Bangkok, Thailand	Decision (3:0)	3	2:00
Wins the 2025 WAKO Thailand Kickboxing World Cup K-1 (-52 kg) Silver Medal.
2025-04-11	Win	(Morocco) Meriem El Moubarik	WAKO 1st Thailand Kickboxing World Cup, Semifinals	Bangkok, Thailand	Decision (3:0)	3	2:00
2024-11-09	Loss	(Israel) Yulia Sachkov	2024 WAKO European Championships, Final	Athens, Greece	Decision (3:0)	3	2:00
Wins the 2024 WAKO European Championship K-1 (-52 kg) Silver Medal.
2024-11-07	Win	(Ukraine) Daryna Ivanova	2024 WAKO European Championships, Semifinals	Athens, Greece	Decision 3:0)	3	2:00
2024-11-06	Win	(Germany) Alessia Amato	2024 WAKO European Championships, Quarterfinals	Athens, Greece	Decision (Unanimous)	3	2:00
2024-11-04	Win	(Serbia) Milica Despotovic	2024 WAKO European Championships, First Round	Athens, Greece	Decision (Unanimous)	3	2:00
2024-03-24	Win	(Israel) Yulia Sachkov	2024 Italian Kickboxing World Cup, Tournament Final	Jesolo, Italy	Decision (Unanimous)	3	2:00
Wins the 2024 Italian Kickboxing World Cup K-1 (-52 kg) Gold Medal.
2024-03-22	Win	(Finland) Noora Al-Saffu	2024 Italian Kickboxing World Cup, Tournament Semifinal	Jesolo, Italy	Decision (Unanimous)	3	2:00
2024-03-21	Win	(Bulgaria) Antonia Marinova	2024 Italian Kickboxing World Cup, Tournament Quarterfinal	Jesolo, Italy	Decision (Unanimous)	3	2:00
2023-11-26	Win	(Ukraine) Daryna Ivanova	2023 WAKO World Championship, Tournament Final	Lisbon, Portugal	Decision (Unanimous)	3	2:00
Wins the 2023 WAKO World Championship K-1 (-52 kg) Gold Medal.
2023-11-24	Win	(Finland) Noora Al-Saffu	2023 WAKO World Championship, Tournament Semifinal	Lisbon, Portugal	Decision (Unanimous)	3	2:00
2023-11-22	Win	(Kazakhstan) Aruzhan Shimirova	2023 WAKO World Championship, Tournament Quarterfinal	Lisbon, Portugal	Decision (Unanimous)	3	2:00
2023-11-20	Win	(Poland) Oliwia Kramarz	2023 WAKO World Championship, Tournament Opening Round	Lisbon, Portugal	Decision (Unanimous)	3	2:00
2023-10-01	Win	(Israel) Yulia Sachkov	2023 Italian Kickboxing World Cup, Tournament Final	Jesolo, Italy	Decision (Split)	3	2:00
Wins the 2023 Italian Kickboxing World Cup K-1 (-52 kg) Gold Medal.
2023-09-30	Win	(Germany) Hannah Biermann	2023 Italian Kickboxing World Cup, Tournament Semifinal	Jesolo, Italy	Decision (Unanimous)	3	2:00
2023-03-19	Win	(Czech Republic) Markéta Krejzlová	2023 Austrian Classics Kickboxing World Cup, Tournament Final	Innsbruck, Austria	Decision (Unanimous)	3	2:00
Wins the 2023 Austrian Classics Kickboxing World Cup K-1 (-52 kg) Gold Medal.
2023-03-18	Win	(Hungary) Zsofia Nagy	2023 Austrian Classics Kickboxing World Cup, Tournament Semifinal	Innsbruck, Austria	Decision (Unanimous)	3	2:00
2023-03-17	Win	(Finland) Noora Al-Saffu	2023 Austrian Classics Kickboxing World Cup, Tournament Quarterfinal	Innsbruck, Austria	Decision (Unanimous)	3	2:00
2022-07-15	Loss	(Ukraine) Daryna Ivanova	The World Games 2022 - Kickboxing, Bronze Medal fight	Birmingham, USA	Decision (Unanimous)	3	3:00
2022-07-14	Loss	(Israel) Shir Cohen	The World Games 2022 - Kickboxing, Semifinal	Birmingham, USA	Decision (Split)	3	3:00
2022-07-13	Win	(Slovakia) Monika Chochlíková	The World Games 2022 - Kickboxing, Quarterfinal	Birmingham, USA	Decision (Split)	3	3:00
2022-06-05	Win	(Ukraine) Daryna Ivanova	2022 Hungarian Kickboxing World Cup, Tournament Final	Budapest, Hungary	Decision (Unanimous)	3	2:00
Wins the 2022 Hungarian Kickboxing World Cup K-1 (-52 kg) Gold Medal.
2022-06-04	Win	(Hungary) Anna Szekely	2022 Hungarian Kickboxing World Cup, Tournament Semifinal	Budapest, Hungary	Decision (Unanimous)	3	2:00
2022-06-03	Win	(Israel) Shir Cohen	2022 Hungarian Kickboxing World Cup, Tournament Quarterfinal	Budapest, Hungary	Decision (Unanimous)	3	2:00
2022-02-13	Win	(Finland) Elsa Narhi	2022 Karlovac Open European Cup, Tournament Final	Karlovac, Croatia	Decision (Unanimous)	3	2:00
Wins the 2022 Karlovac Open European Cup K-1 (-52 kg) Gold Medal.
2022-02-12	Win	(Italy) Silvia Sciutto	2022 Karlovac Open European Cup, Tournament Semifinal	Karlovac, Croatia	Decision (Unanimous)	3	2:00
2022-02-11	Win	(Finland) Noora Al-Saffu	2022 Karlovac Open European Cup, Tournament Quarterfinal	Karlovac, Croatia	Decision (Unanimous)	3	2:00
2021-10-17	Loss	(Poland) Iwona Nieroda-Zdziebko	2021 WAKO World Championship, Tournament Second Round	Jesolo, Italy	Decision (Split)	3	2:00
2021-09-19	Win	(Israel) Shir Cohen	2021 Hungarian Kickboxing World Cup, Tournament Final	Budapest, Hungary	Decision (Split)	3	2:00
Wins the 2021 Hungarian Kickboxing World Cup K-1 (-52 kg) Gold Medal.
2021-09-18	Win	(Ukraine) Daryna Ivanova	2021 Hungarian Kickboxing World Cup, Tournament Semifinal	Budapest, Hungary	Decision (Split)	3	2:00
2021-05-30	Win	(Israel) Shir Cohen	2021 Karlovac Open European Cup, Tournament Final	Karlovac, Croatia	Decision (Unanimous)	3	2:00
Wins the 2021 Karlovac Open European Cup K-1 (-52 kg) Gold Medal.
2021-05-29	Win	(Ukraine) Mariia Bielkina	2021 Karlovac Open European Cup, Tournament Semifinal	Karlovac, Croatia	Decision (Unanimous)	3	2:00
2021-05-28	Win	(Bulgaria) Teodora Kirilova	2021 Karlovac Open European Cup, Tournament Quarterfinal	Karlovac, Croatia	Decision (Unanimous)	3	2:00
2021-05-28	Win	(Portugal) Inês Calado	2021 Karlovac Open European Cup, Tournament Opening Round	Karlovac, Croatia	Decision (Unanimous)	3	2:00
2019-10-	Loss	(Israel) Yulia Sachkov	2019 WAKO World Championship, Tournament Final	Sarajevo, Bosnia and Herzegovina	Decision (Split)	3	2:00
Wins the 2019 WAKO World Championship K-1 (-48 kg) Silver Medal.
2019-10-	Win	(Russia) Kabirabonu Ulugova	2019 WAKO World Championship, Tournament Semifinal	Sarajevo, Bosnia and Herzegovina	Decision (Unanimous)	3	2:00
2019-10-	Win	(Poland) Dagmara Tchorek	2019 WAKO World Championship, Tournament Quarterfinal	Sarajevo, Bosnia and Herzegovina	Decision (Unanimous)	3	2:00
2019-09-	Loss	(Russia) Polina Petukhova	2019 WAKO K-1 World Grand Prix, Tournament Final	Prague, Czech Republic	Decision (Unanimous)	3	2:00
Wins the 2019 WAKO K-1 World Grand Prix (-48 kg) Silver Medal.
2019-09-	Win	(Czech Republic) Tereza Netusilova	2019 WAKO K-1 World Grand Prix, Tournament Semifinal	Prague, Czech Republic	Decision (Split)	3	2:00
2019-09-	Win	(Hungary) Melinda Zsiga	2019 WAKO K-1 World Grand Prix, Tournament Quarterfinal	Prague, Czech Republic	Decision (Unanimous)	3	2:00
Legend: Win Loss Draw/No contest Notes

== See also ==
- List of female kickboxers
