= Acrobatic gymnastics at the 2025 World Games – Women's group =

Women's group at the 2025 World Games
- Venue: Dong'an Lake Sports Park Gymnasium, Chengdu, China
- Date: 9 August
- Competitors: 24 from 6 nations
- Winning total: 29.230 points

Medalists
1st place, gold medalist(s)		Ding Wenyan; Gu Quanjia; Ma Yixing	China
2nd place, silver medalist(s)		Caylei Caldwell; Olivia Green; Rebecca Greenberg	United States
3rd place, bronze medalist(s)		Nikol Aleinik; Lia Bar Noy; Michal Stratievsky	Israel

The women's group competition at the 2025 World Games took place on 9 August at the Dong'an Lake Sports Park Gymnasium in Chengdu, China.

== Competition format ==
The top 4 teams in qualifications, based on combined scores of each round, advanced to the final. The scores in qualification do not count in the final.

== Results ==
=== Qualification ===
The results were as follows;

Team	Balance		Dynamic		Total (All-around)	
Team	Score	Rank	Score	Rank	Score	Rank
China	29.260	1	28.030	3	57.290	1
Israel	28.580	2	28.120	2	56.700	2
United States	28.300	3	28.120	1	56.420	3
Germany	27.910	4	27.520	5	55.430	4
Ukraine	26.480	5	27.550	4	54.030	5
Finland	25.830	6	25.670	6	51.500	6

=== Final ===
The results were as follows;

Rank	Team	Difficulty	Artistry	Execution	Penalty	Total (All-around)
Rank	Team	Score	Score	Score	Score	Score
1st place, gold medalist(s)	China	3.330	8.600	17.300		29.230
2nd place, silver medalist(s)	United States	2.170	8.900	17.600		28.670
3rd place, bronze medalist(s)	Israel	2.280	8.800	17.400		28.480
4	Germany	2.180	8.650	17.200		28.030
