= Judo at the 2018 Summer Youth Olympics – Boys' 55 kg =

Judo competition

Boys' 55 kg at the III Summer Youth Olympic Games
- Venue: Parque Polideportivo Roca
- Date: October 7
- Competitors: 12 from 12 nations

Medalists
1st place, gold medalist(s)		Artsiom Kolasau	Belarus
2nd place, silver medalist(s)		Temuujin Ganburged	Mongolia
3rd place, bronze medalist(s)		Oleh Veredyba	Ukraine
3rd place, bronze medalist(s)		Daniel Leutgeb	Austria

The Boys' 55 kg competition at the 2018 Summer Youth Olympics was held on 7 October, at the Asia Pavilion.

== Schedule ==
All times are in local time (UTC-3).

Date	Time	Round
Sunday, 7 October 2018	10:00; 11:00; 11:00; 12:00; 15:00	Round of 16; Quarterfinals; Repechage Rounds; Semifinals; Finals

== Results ==
Legend

- 1st number — Ippon
- 2nd number — Waza-ari
- s — Shido

=== Main Bracket ===
Round of 16
Adrián Medero (PUR)	00
Romain Valadier-Picard (FRA)	10
Daniel Leutgeb (AUT)	10
Euclides Lopes (GBS)	00
Ariel Shulman (ISR)	00
Oleh Veredyba (UKR)	10
Juan Montealegre (COL)	01s1
Yuri Israelyan (ARM)	00

Quarterfinals
Artsiom Kolasau (BLR)	10
Romain Valadier-Picard (FRA)	00
Aleddine Ben Chalbi (TUN)	01s1
Daniel Leutgeb (AUT)	10
Bryan Garboa (ECU)	00s1
Oleh Veredyba (UKR)	10
Temuujin Ganburged (MGL)	10
Juan Montealegre (COL)	00s3

Semifinals
Artsiom Kolasau (BLR)	11
Daniel Leutgeb (AUT)	00s2
Oleh Veredyba (UKR)	00
Temuujin Ganburged (MGL)	10

Final
Artsiom Kolasau (BLR)	10s1
Temuujin Ganburged (MGL)	00s1

=== Repechage ===
Repechage 1

Repechage 2
Adrián Medero (PUR)	00
Aleddine Ben Chalbi (TUN)	11s1
Euclides Lopes (GBS)	00s1
Romain Valadier-Picard (FRA)	10
Ariel Shulman (ISR)	10
Juan Montealegre (COL)	00
Yuri Israelyan (ARM)	00s3
Bryan Garboa (ECU)	10s2

Repechage 3
Aleddine Ben Chalbi (TUN)	00s2
Romain Valadier-Picard (FRA)	01s2
Ariel Shulman (ISR)	10
Bryan Garboa (ECU)	00

Bronze Medal Finals
Romain Valadier-Picard (FRA)	00s3
Oleh Veredyba (UKR)	10
Ariel Shulman (ISR)	00s1
Daniel Leutgeb (AUT)	10

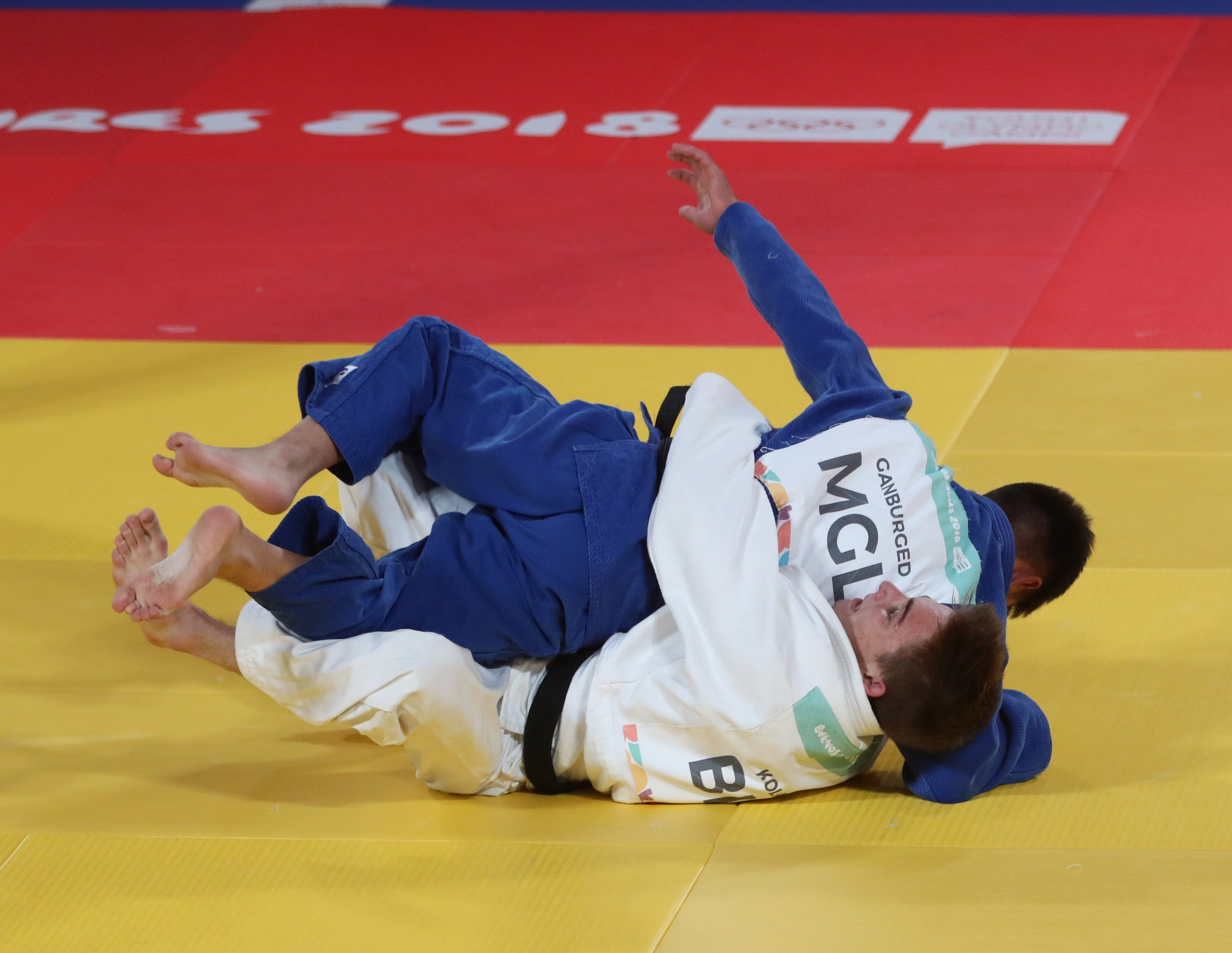
Final: Artsiom Kolasau (on bottom, with the ippon move) vs. Temuujin Ganburged

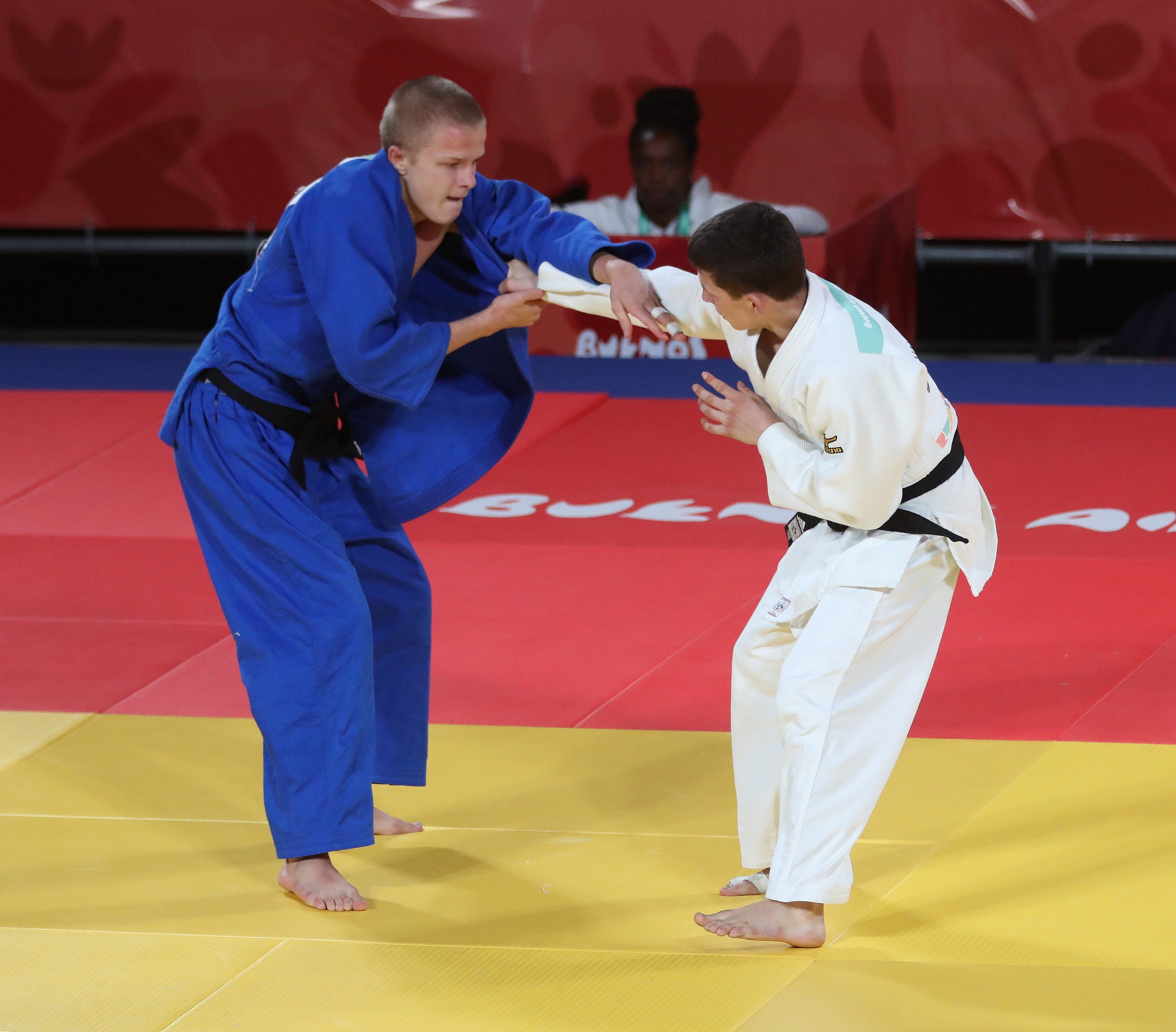
Bronze medal match: Romain Valadier-Picard vs. Oleh Veredyba (left)

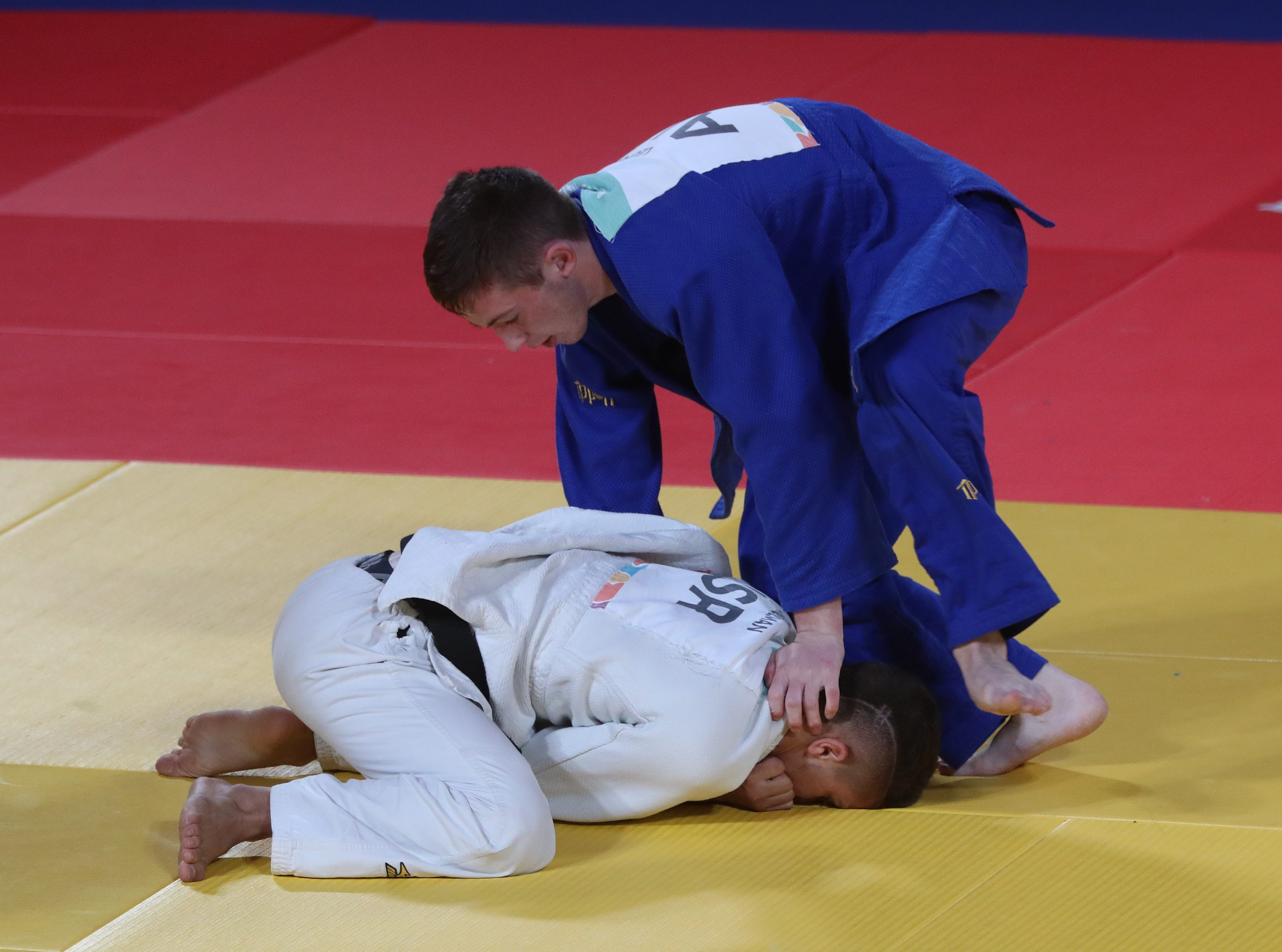
Bronze medal match: Ariel Shulman vs. Daniel Leutgeb (on top)

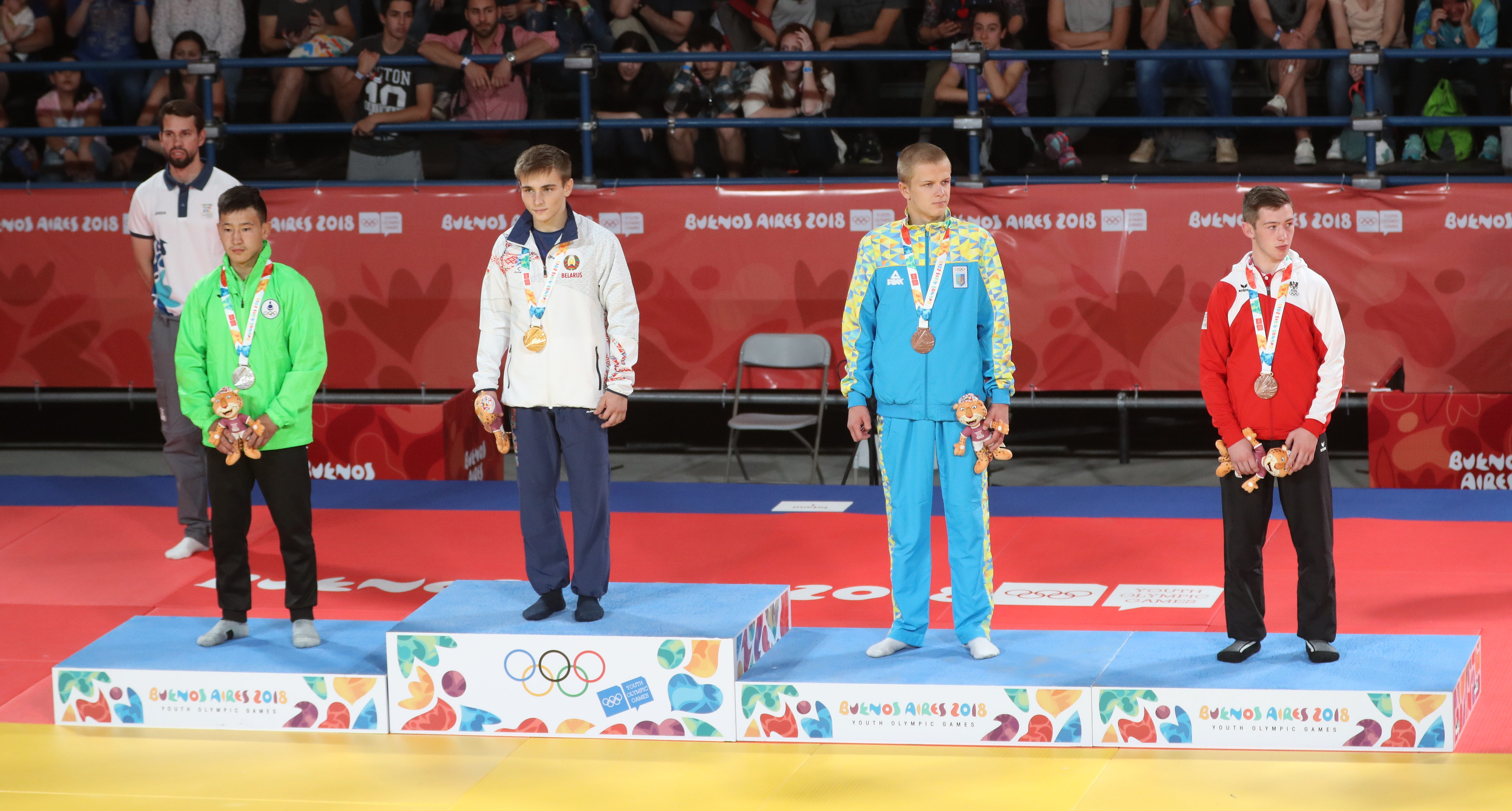
Victory ceremony
