= Afghanistan at the 2022 World Games =

- IOC code: AFG
- NOC: National Olympic Committee of the Islamic Republic of Afghanistan

in Birmingham, Alabama, United States 7 July 2022 – 17 July 2022
- Competitors: 3 in 1 sport
- Medals: Gold 0 Silver 0 Bronze 0 Total 0

World Games appearances
- 1981; 1985; 1989; 1993; 1997; 2001; 2005; 2009; 2013; 2017; 2022; 2025

Afghanistan competed at the 2022 World Games held in Birmingham, United States from 7 to 17 July 2022.

== Competitors ==
The following is the list of number of competitors in the Games.

Sport	Men	Women	Total
Muaythai	1	2	3
Total	1	2	3

== Muaythai ==
Afghanistan entered three competitors in Muay Thai.

Men

Athlete	Category	Quarterfinals	Semifinals	Final/Bronze medal bout	
Athlete	Category	Opposition Result	Opposition Result	Opposition Result	Rank
Ali Sina Sakhizada	57 kg	Sarsembekov (KAZ); L 17–20	Did not advance		

Women

Athlete	Category	Quarterfinals	Semifinals	Final/Bronze medal bout	
Athlete	Category	Opposition Result	Opposition Result	Opposition Result	Rank
Kawsar Sherzad	48 kg	Kulinich (UKR); L 9–10	Did not advance		
Freshta Sherzad	51 kg	Hodl (AUT); L 28–29	Did not advance		
