= Noa Kazado Yakar =

Israeli acrobatic gymnast

- נועה קזדו יקר
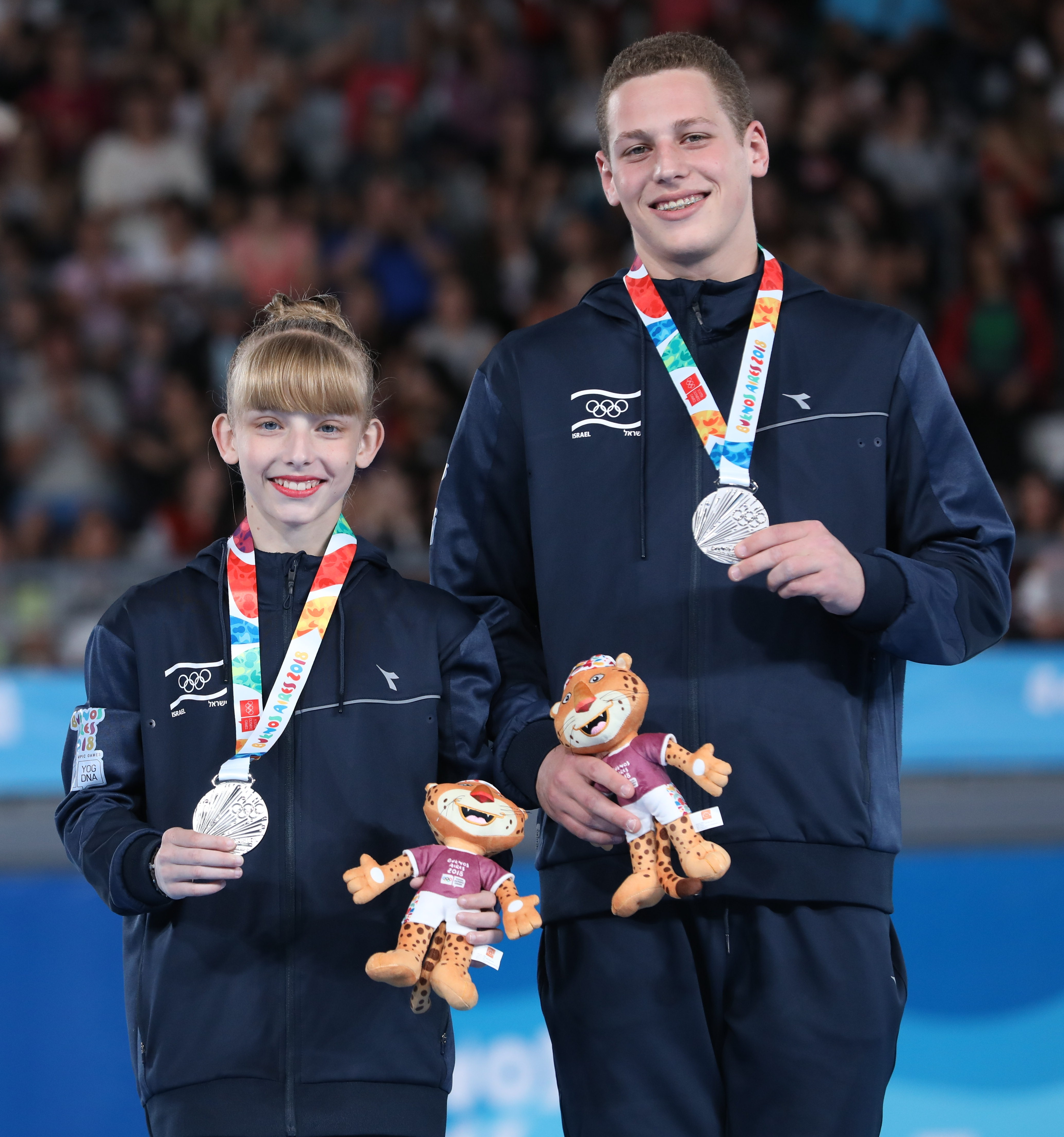
- Noa Kazado Yakar and Yonatan Fridman during the 2018 Youth Olympic Games victory ceremony

Personal information
- Born: November 26, 2003 (age 22) Israel

Gymnastics career
- Discipline: Acrobatic gymnastics
- Country represented: Israel
- Club: Hapoel "Begin" Holon
- Head coach: Shiran Ouaknine
Medal record
Acrobatic Gymnastics
Representing Israel
Youth Olympic Games
Silver medal – second place	2018 Buenos Aires	Mixed Pair

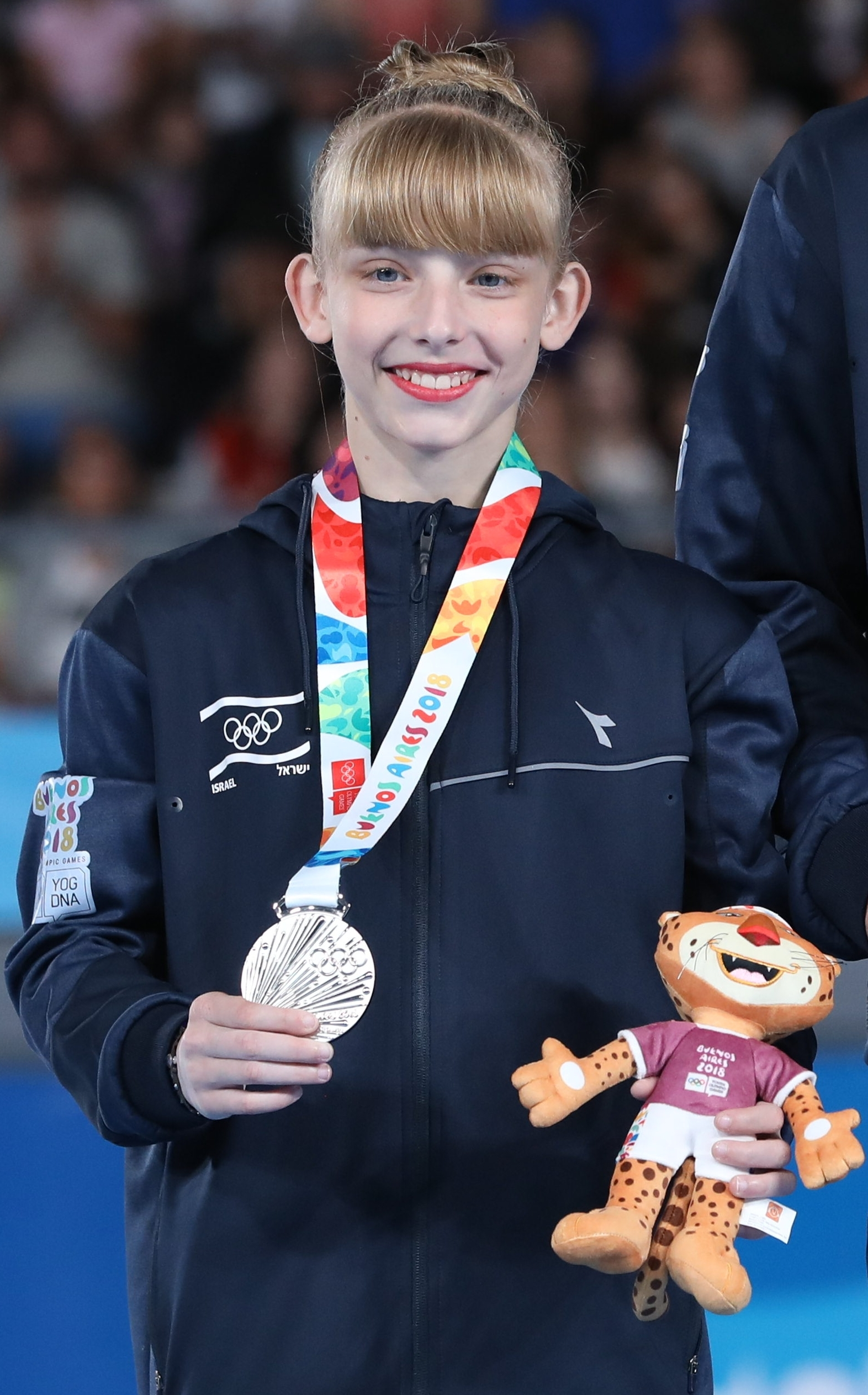
Kazado Yakar in 2018

Noa Kazado Yakar (Hebrew: נועה קזדו יקר; born November 26, 2003) is an Israeli acrobatic gymnast. She was the silver medalist at the 2018 Youth Olympic Games in the acrobatic gymnastics mixed pair event, along with her partner Yonatan Fridman. They achieved a score of 27.590 (losing by 0.260 points to the team from Bulgaria). They dedicated their performance to the late boyfriend of their coach, who had died in a motorcycle accident.

Her coach is Shiran Ouaknine.

== See also ==
- Israel at the Youth Olympics
