= Afghanistan at the 2025 World Games =

- IOC code: AFG
- NOC: National Olympic Committee of the Islamic Republic of Afghanistan

in Chengdu, China 7 August 2025 – 17 August 2025
- Competitors: 1 (1 man and 0 women) in 1 sport and 1 event

World Games appearances
- 1981; 1985; 1989; 1993; 1997; 2001; 2005; 2009; 2013; 2017; 2022; 2025

Afghanistan will compete at the 2025 World Games held in Chengdu, China from 7 to 17 August 2025.

== Competitors ==
The following is the list of number of competitors in the Games.

Sport	Men	Women	Total
Muaythai	1	0	1
Total	1	0	1

== Muaythai ==
Afghanistan competed in muaythai.

Athlete	Event	Quarterfinal	Semifinal	Final / BM	
Athlete	Event	Opposition Result	Opposition Result	Opposition Result	Rank
Sayed Rohullah Mosawi	Men's –57 kg	Shelesko (UKR); L 28-29	Did not advance		
