= Serbia at the 2025 World Games =

- IOC code: SRB
- NOC: Olympic Committee of Serbia

in Chengdu, China 7 August 2025 – 17 August 2025
- Competitors: 4 (1 man and 3 women) in 4 sports and 5 events
- Medals Ranked 77th: Gold 0 Silver 0 Bronze 1 Total 1

World Games appearances
- 1981; 1985; 1989; 1993; 1997; 2001; 2005; 2009; 2013; 2017; 2022; 2025

Serbia competed at the 2025 World Games held in Chengdu, China from 7 to 17 August 2025.

Athletes representing Serbia won one bronze medal and the country finished in 77th place in the medal table.

== Medalist ==
Medal	Name	Sport	Event	Date
Bronze	Aleksandra Krstić	Kickboxing	Women's K1 style 70 kg	14 August

== Competitors ==
The following is the list of number of competitors in the Games.

Sport	Men	Women	Total
Air sports	0	1	1
Canoe marathon	0	1	1
Kickboxing	0	1	1
Sambo	1	0	1
Total	1	3	4
