= Yonatan Fridman =

Israeli acrobatic gymnast

- יונתן פרידמן
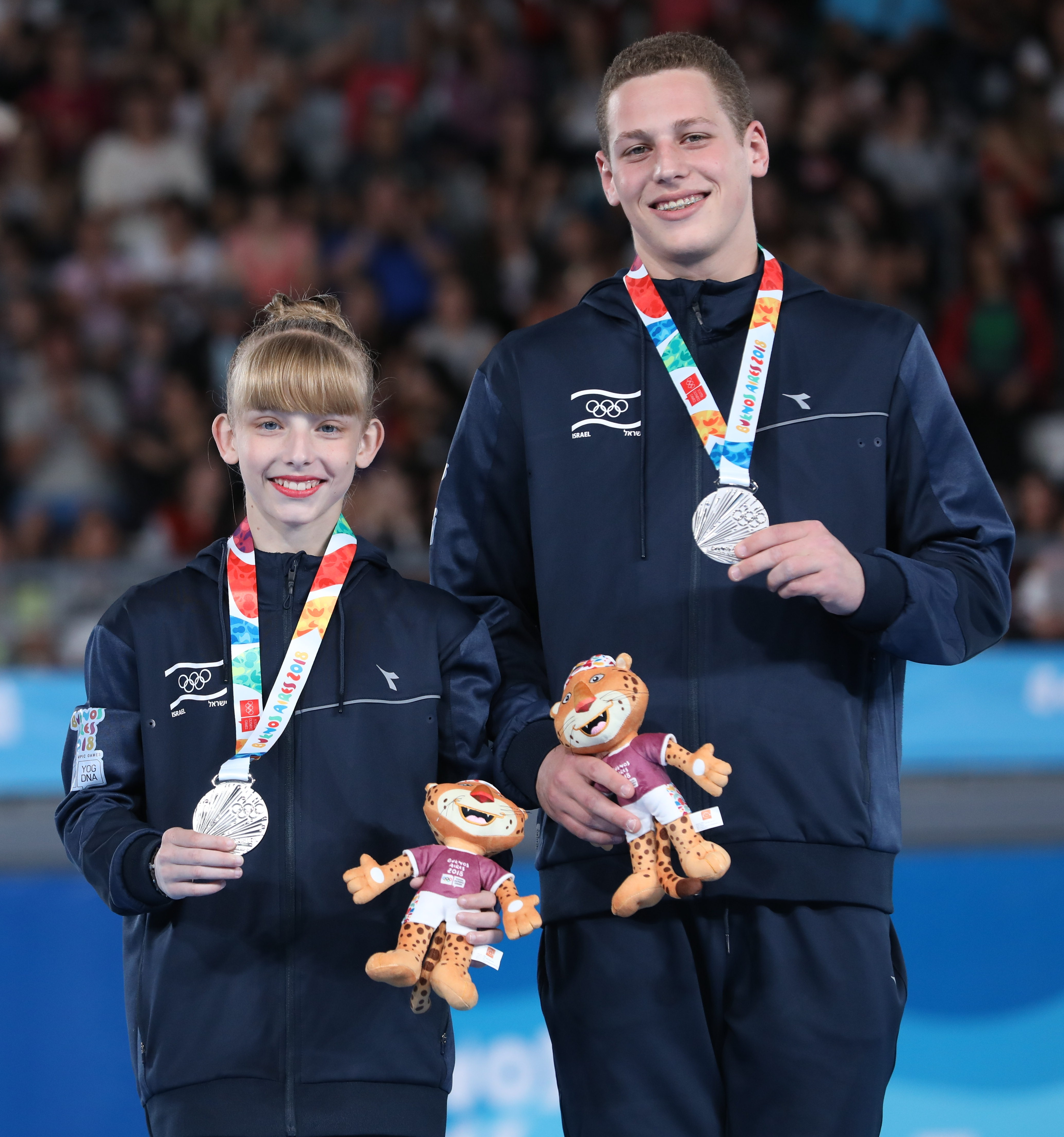
- Noa Kazado Yakar and Yonatan Fridman during the 2018 Youth Olympic Games victory ceremony

Personal information
- Born: March 14, 2003 (age 23) Israel
- Height: 181 cm (5 ft 11 in)

Gymnastics career
- Discipline: Acrobatic gymnastics
- Country represented: Israel
- Club: Hapoel "Begin" Holon
- Head coach: Shiran Ouaknine
Medal record
Acrobatic Gymnastics
Representing Israel
World Games
Bronze medal – third place	2025 Chengdu	Mixed Pair
World Championships
Silver medal – second place	2024 Guimarães	Balance Mixed Pair
Silver medal – second place	2024 Guimarães	Dynamic Mixed Pair
European Championships
Gold medal – first place	2025 Luxembourg	All-Around Mixed Pair
Silver medal – second place	2025 Luxembourg	Balance Mixed Pair
Silver medal – second place	2025 Luxembourg	Dynamic Mixed Pair
Youth Olympic Games
Silver medal – second place	2018 Buenos Aires	Mixed Pair

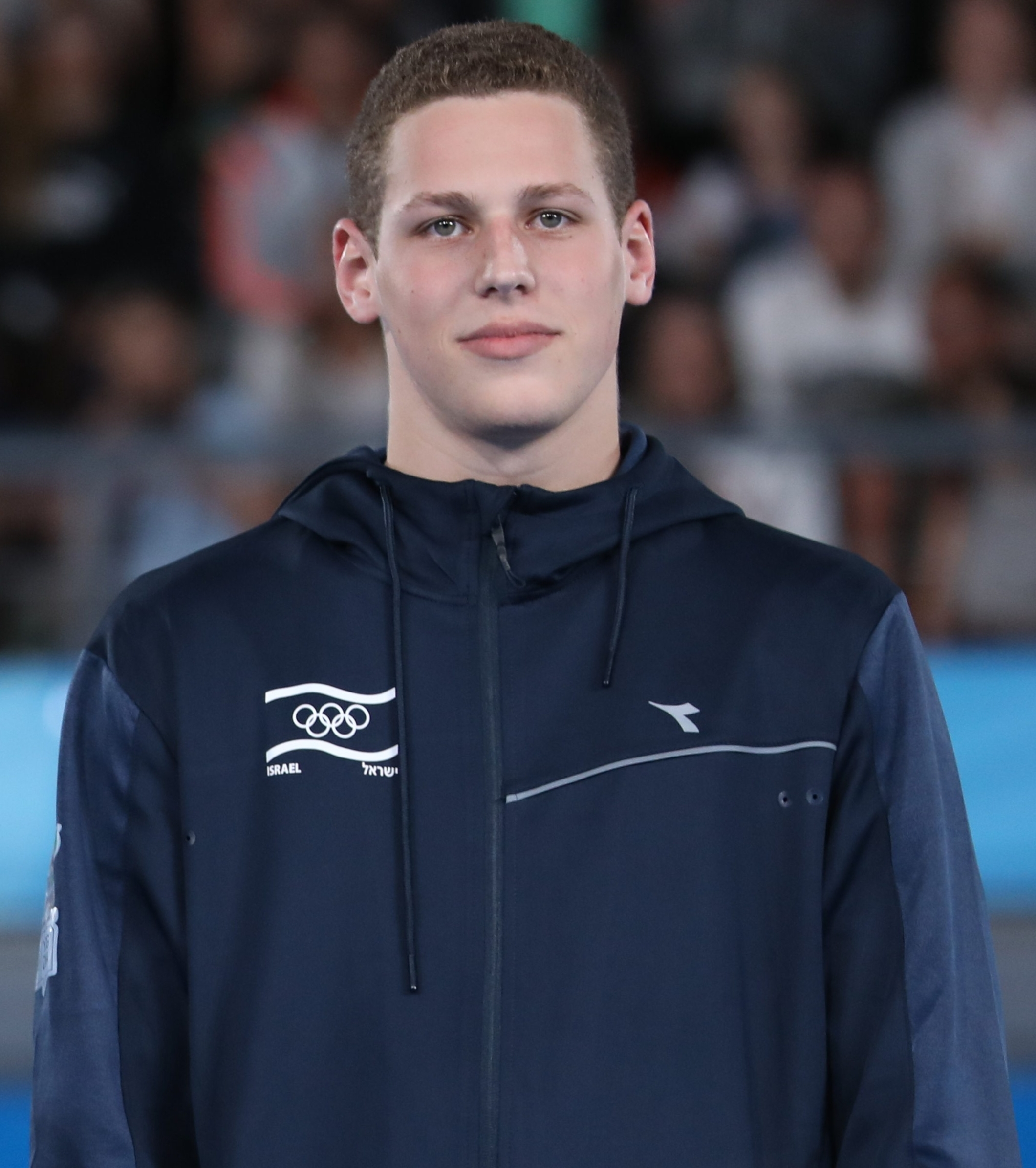
Fridman in 2018

Yonatan Fridman (Hebrew: יונתן פרידמן; born March 14, 2003) is an Israeli acrobatic gymnast who won a silver medal at the 2018 Youth Olympic Games.

He was born in Israel. Fridman is 181 cm tall (5' 11").

== Gymnastics career ==
His acrobatic gymnastics coach is Shiran Ouaknine.

Fridman won the silver medal for mixed pair acrobatic gymnastics, at the 2018 Youth Olympic Games which took place at Buenos Aires, Argentina, along with his partner Noa Kazado Yakar. They achieved a score of 27.590 (losing by 0.260 points to the team from Bulgaria). They dedicated their performance to the late boyfriend of their coach, who had died in a motorcycle accident.

== See also ==
- Israel at the Youth Olympics
