= Yulia Sachkov =

Israeli kickboxer

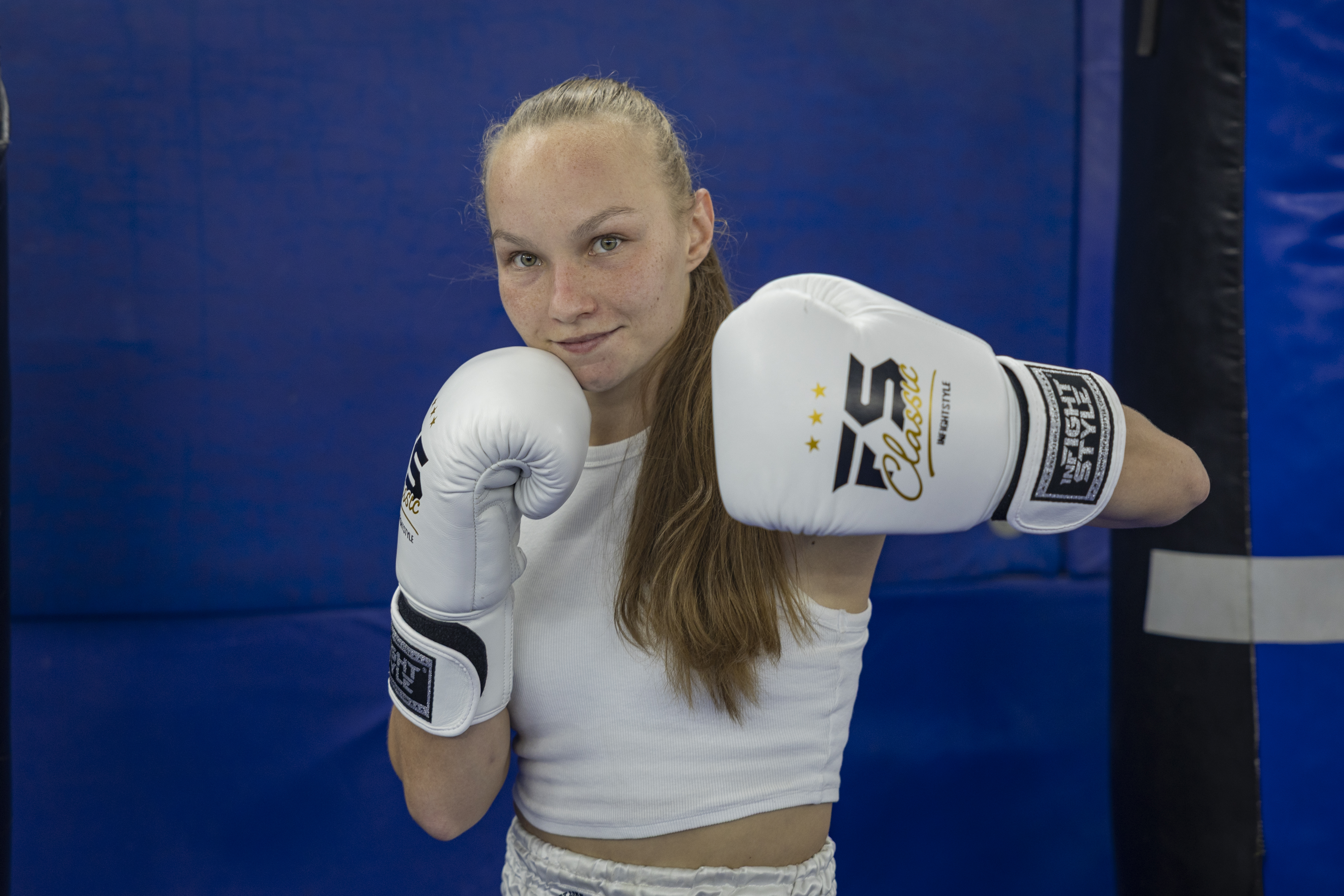
- Yulia Sachkov in 2025
- Born: Yulia Sachkov; 28 December 1998 (age 27); Almaty, Kazakhstan
- Nationality: Israel
- Height: 5 ft 3 in (1.60 m)
- Weight: 48 kg (106 lb)
- Division: Strawweight
- Style: Kickboxing
- Trainer: Michael Britavsky
- Rank: European Kickboxing Champion – juniors (2017); 2019 WAKO World Kickboxing Champion; European Kickboxing Champion – seniors (2024); 2025 World Games Kickboxing Champion; 2025 WAKO World Kickboxing Champion
- Years active: 2015–present

Yulia Sachkov (Hebrew: יוליה סצ'קוב; born 28 December 1998) is an Israeli kickboxer.

She immigrated to Israel from Kazakhstan at the age of two and grew up in Haifa where she lives. Sachkov trains under Michael Britavsky and completed her service in the Israel Defense Forces. She also works as a trainer. She is a multiple Israeli champion and the winner of multiple international tournaments held under the World Association of Kickboxing Organizations (WAKO) in weight categories ranging from 48 to 56 kilograms. She has received national sports awards.

== Biography ==
Sachkov was born in Almaty, Kazakhstan, at just six months of gestation. At birth she weighed only 900 grams, and doctors doubted she would survive. At the age of two, she immigrated to Israel with her parents and has lived in Haifa since childhood.

She began practicing martial arts at the age of 13 or 14, according to different sources. While attending a children's sports camp, she chose the hand-to-hand combat system of Krav Maga from the available disciplines. She was the only girl in this training group, which was led by coach Michael Britavsky.

During training, Britavsky noted her natural competitive drive. Under his guidance, Sachkov tried several combat sports—karate, taekwondo, and judo—before ultimately choosing kickboxing because it offered the fewest restrictions in striking technique.

She served in the Israel Defense Forces. She works in Haifa as a coach for children and youth.

== Sporting career ==
In 2015, Sachkov became the Israeli kickboxing champion for the first time.

In 2017–2018, she tried her hand at mixed martial arts (MMA), taking part in two professional fights, both of which ended in defeat.

Since 2016, she has won a number of medals at international tournaments held under the World Association of Kickboxing Organizations (WAKO) in weight categories ranging from 48 to 56 kilograms.

=== 2016–2018 ===
In May 2016, she won the junior kickboxing World Cup in Budapest (Hungary), defeating Marie Annabelle Coré from Mauritania and Nikoletta Cotun from Moldova. At the Junior World Championships in Dublin (Ireland), in the −52 kg category, she lost her fight to the Polish athlete Roksana Dargiel and got a bronze medal.

In September 2017, she won the European Junior Kickboxing Championships in Skopje (North Macedonia), defeating Diana Shkvarok of Ukraine, Romalea Mesindianu of Greece, and Paulina Turulska of Poland.

In November, she earned a bronze medal at the senior World Championships in Budapest, defeating Emma Dignam of Ireland and Valery Castaneda of Guatemala, before losing in the semifinal to the Hungarian athlete Gabriella Busa.

In 2018, she took first place at the Bestfighter World Cup in Rimini (Italy), defeating the Italian athletes Elena Cardoni and Francesca Tentorio.

That same year, she earned a bronze medal at the European Kickboxing Championships in Bratislava (Slovakia), defeating Zekiye Zelal Şengür of Turkey but losing to the French athlete Myriam Djedidi.

=== 2019–2022 ===
In 2019, she became the world champion in Sarajevo (Bosnia and Herzegovina) under K-1 rules, defeating Hanna Dubyna of Ukraine in the quarterfinals, Lyudmila Chyslova of Belarus in the semifinals, and Klára Strnadová of the Czech Republic in the final.

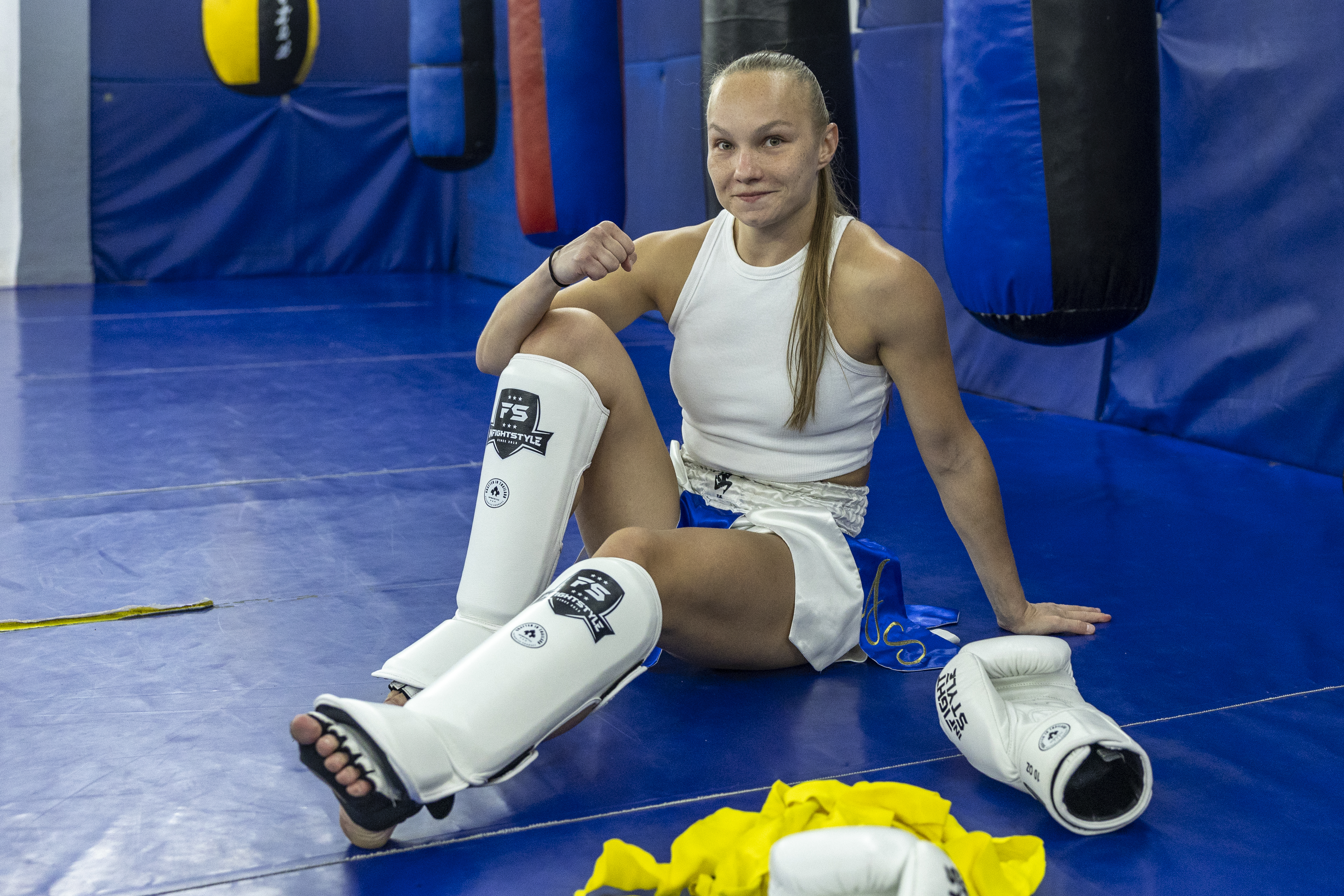
Sachkov in 2025

In 2020, during the lockdown imposed due to the COVID-19 pandemic, she won the Athletic Martial Arts – VIP Home Championships. The competition featured 15 leading Israeli fighters and world champions, who performed nine specialized exercises at home, each corresponding to different martial arts styles.

In May 2021, she competed at the European Cup Karlovac Open 2021 in Karlovac, Croatia, in the −52 kg category, losing to the Ukrainian athlete Mariya Belkina.

In September, she won the 26th Hungarian Kickboxing World Cup in Budapest in the −48 kg category, defeating the Polish athletes Kamila Gołębiewska and Dominika Chylińska.

In October, at the World Championships in Jesolo (Italy), she lost in the quarterfinals to Russian athlete Diana Doktugu and finished in fifth place.

=== 2022–2025 ===
In March 2022, she won the Serbia Open – WAKO European Cup in Kraljevo (Serbia), defeating the Serbian athlete Marta Vučić under K-1 rules in the −48 kg category. At the same event, she took first place under KL rules in the −50 kg and −55 kg categories, defeating the North Macedonian athletes Lea Boshevska and Andrea Kostovska.

In May, at the International Turkish Open Kickboxing World Cup, she lost under KL rules in the −50 kg category to the Turkish athlete Duygu Turan. In the −55 kg category she defeated the Turkish athlete Seyma Denktas and Slovakia's Lucia Fečkova, but lost in the final to Fatima Begmuradova of Tajikistan, earning a silver medal. Under LC rules in the −50 kg category, she was defeated by Tyra Barada of Slovenia. In the −55 kg category, she defeated the Turkish athlete Celik Hacer Kadriye but then lost to her compatriot Sağlam Sultan, earning a bronze medal.

In June, she won the 27th Hungarian Kickboxing World Cup in Budapest in the −48 kg category, once again defeating Kamila Gołębiewska and Dominika Chylińska.

In July, she won the Uzbekistan Open — 2 tournament held in Tashkent (Uzbekistan), defeating Uzbekistan's Shirinoy Zokhidova in the quarterfinals, South Korea's Im Yugyeon in the semifinals, and Turkey's Derya Kirmizigul in the final.

In November, she earned a silver medal at the WAKO European Championships 2022 in Antalya (Turkey), defeating Aleksandra Džikaeva of Estonia in the semifinals and losing in the final to the Turkish athlete Zeynep Çetintaş.

In June 2023, she won the 28th Hungarian Kickboxing World Cup (K-1, −52 kg), consecutively defeating Sirin Biščević of Bosnia and Herzegovina, Zsofia Nagy of Hungary, Niina Ojonen of Finland, and Darina Ivanova of Ukraine.

In September, she earned a silver medal at the Italian World Cup, losing in the final bout to Klára Strnadová.

In November, she competed at the World Championships in Albufeira (Portugal), winning her first fight against Fatima Rajabzade Shahbandlu of Azerbaijan but losing the next bout to Darina Ivanova.

In January 2024, she won the European Cup held in Athens (Greece), defeating Italian fighter Elena Cardoni in the semifinal and scoring a knockout victory in the final against Viktória Dóra Bálint-Pálfi of Hungary.

In February, she won the European Cup Zagreb Open (ex Karlovac Open) in Croatia in the K-1 −52 kg category, defeating Austria's Rafaela Zweimüller and Viktória Bálint-Pálfi.

In March, she competed at the Italian World Cup in Jesolo (Italy), where in the K-1 −52 kg category she defeated Austrian fighter Rebecca Hödl and once again beat Viktória Bálint-Pálfi to reach the final, where she lost the decisive bout to Klára Strnadová and took the silver medal.

In June, she took part in the 29th Hungarian Kickboxing World Cup in Budapest, where she defeated Elena Cardoni but lost to Darina Ivanova, taking third place in the K-1 −52 kg category.

In November, at the European Championships also held in Athens, she achieved consecutive victories over Cristina Morales of Spain, Noora Al-Saffu of Finland, and Feyzanur Azizoglu of Turkey, and in the final defeated Klára Strnadová to win the gold medal.

In January 2025, she competed at the Athens Challenge European Cup in Athens, where she defeated Elena Cardoni and took first place in the K-1 −52 kg category.

In March, at the Italian Kickboxing World Cup, she defeated Elena Cardoni in the semifinal but lost the final bout to Klára Strnadová.

In April, she won the 1st Thailand Kickboxing World Cup in Bangkok (Thailand), defeating Claudine Veloso of the Philippines in the quarterfinal, Rattanaphon Hanphan of Thailand in the semifinal, and Klára Strnadová in the final.

In June, she won the 30th Hungarian Kickboxing World Cup in Budapest, defeating Chiara Pagliuca of Italy in the quarterfinal, Konstantina Aroniada of Greece in the semifinal, and Darina Ivanova in the final.

In August, she became the kickboxing champion at the 2025 World Games in Chengdu (China), winning consecutive bouts against Moroccan fighter Meriem El Moubarik in the quarterfinal, Darina Ivanova in the semifinal, and Klára Strnadová in the final.

In November, she once again took first place at the K-1 World Kickboxing Championships in the −52 kg category. Her Egyptian opponent, Raouda Mohammed, failed to appear for their bout, and she went on to defeat Daryna Ivanova in the semifinal and Klára Strnadová in the final.

== Fight record ==
The following fight record is based on data from sports websites.

Amateur kickboxing record (WAKO)
Career summary
Fights	Wins	Losses	Win %
74	57	17	77.03%

Amateur kickboxing record
Date	Result	Opponent	Event	Location	Method	Round	Time
2025-11-26	Win	(Egypt) Raouda Mohammed	2025 WAKO World Championships – K-1, Quarterfinals	Город, Страна	Win by walkover	0	0:00
2025-11-27	Win	(Ukraine) Daryna Ivanova	2025 WAKO World Championships – K-1, Semifinals	Город, Страна	Decision (3:0)	3	2:00
2025-11-28	Win	(Czech Republic) Klára Strnadová	2025 WAKO World Championships – K-1, Final	Город, Страна	Decision (3:0)	3	2:00
Wins the 2025 WAKO World Championship K-1 (−52 kg) Gold Medal.
2025-08-12	Win	(Morocco) Meriem El Moubarik	2025 World Games – K-1 Tournament, Quarterfinals	Chengdu, China	Decision (3:0)	3	2:00
2025-08-13	Win	(Ukraine) Daryna Ivanova	2025 World Games – K-1 Tournament, Semifinals	Chengdu, China	Decision (3:0)	3	2:00
2025-08-14	Win	(Czech Republic) Klára Strnadová	2025 World Games – K-1 Tournament, Final	Chengdu, China	Decision (3:0)	3	2:00
Wins the 2025 World Games K-1 (−52 kg) Gold Medal.
2025-06-13	Win	(Italy) Chiara Pagliuca	30th Hungarian Kickboxing World Cup 2025, Quarterfinals	Budapest, Hungary	Decision (3:0)	3	2:00
2025-06-14	Win	(Greece) Konstantina Aroniada	30th Hungarian Kickboxing World Cup 2025, Semifinals	Budapest, Hungary	Decision (3:0)	3	2:00
2025-06-15	Win	(Ukraine) Daryna Ivanova	30th Hungarian Kickboxing World Cup 2025, Final	Budapest, Hungary	Decision (3:0)	3	2:00
Wins the 30th Hungarian Kickboxing World Cup 2025 K-1 (−52 kg) Gold Medal.
2025-04-10	Win	(Philippines) Claudine Veloso	WAKO 1st Thailand Kickboxing World Cup 2025, Quarterfinals	Bangkok, Thailand	Decision (3:0)	3	2:00
2025-04-11	Win	(Thailand) Rattanaphon Hanphan	WAKO 1st Thailand Kickboxing World Cup 2025, Semifinals	Bangkok, Thailand	Decision	3	2:00
2025-04-12	Win	(Czech Republic) Klára Strnadová	WAKO 1st Thailand Kickboxing World Cup 2025, Final	Bangkok, Thailand	Decision (3:0)	3	2:00
Wins the 2025 WAKO Thailand Kickboxing World Cup K-1 (−52 kg) Gold Medal.
2025-03-05	Win	(Italy) Elena Cardoni	Italian World Cup 2025, Semifinals	Italy	Decision (3:0)	3	2:00
2025-03-05	Loss	(Czech Republic) Klára Strnadová	Italian World Cup 2025, Final	Italy	Decision	3	2:00
Wins the 2025 Italian World Cup K-1 (−52 kg) Silver Medal.
2025-01-31	Win	(Italy) Elena Cardoni	Athens Challenge European Cup 2025, Final	Athens, Greece	Decision (3:0)	3	2:00
Wins the 2025 Athens Challenge European Cup K-1 (−52 kg) Gold Medal.
2024-11-04	Win	(Spain) Cristina Morales	2024 WAKO European Championships, First Round	Athens, Greece	Decision (3:0)	3	2:00
2024-11-06	Win	(Finland) Noora Al-Saffu	2024 WAKO European Championships, Quarterfinals	Athens, Greece	Decision (3:0)	3	2:00
2024-11-08	Win	(Turkey) Feyzanur Azizoglu	2024 WAKO European Championships, Semifinals	Athens, Greece	Decision (3:0)	3	2:00
2024-11-08	Win	(Czech Republic) Klára Strnadová	2024 WAKO European Championships, Final	Athens, Greece	Decision (3:0)	3	2:00
Wins the 2024 WAKO European Championship K-1 (−52 kg) Gold Medal.
2024-06-	Win	(Italy) Elena Cardoni	29th Hungarian Kickboxing World Cup 2024 – Quarterfinal	Budapest, Hungary	Decision (3:0)	3	2:00
2024-06-	Loss	(Ukraine) Daryna Ivanova	29th Hungarian Kickboxing World Cup 2024 – Semifinal	Budapest, Hungary	Decision (0:3)	3	2:00
Bronze Medal at the 29th Hungarian Kickboxing World Cup 2024 (K-1, −52 kg).
2024-03-	Win	(Austria) Rebecca Hödl	Italian World Cup 2024 – Quarterfinal	Jesolo, Italy	Decision (3:0)	3	2:00
2024-03-	Win	(Hungary) Viktória Dóra Bálint-Pálfi	Italian World Cup 2024 – Semifinal	Jesolo, Italy	Decision (3:0)	3	2:00
2024-03-	Loss	(Czech Republic) Klára Strnadová	Italian World Cup 2024 – Final	Jesolo, Italy	Decision (0:3)	3	2:00
Wins the Silver Medal at the 2024 Italian World Cup (K-1, −52 kg).
2024-02-	Win	(Austria) Rafaela Zweimüller	European Cup Zagreb Open 2024 – Semifinal	Zagreb, Croatia	Decision (3:0)	3	2:00
2024-02-	Win	(Hungary) Viktória Dóra Bálint-Pálfi	European Cup Zagreb Open 2024 – Final	Zagreb, Croatia	Decision (3:0)	3	2:00
Wins the 2024 European Cup Zagreb Open (K-1, −52 kg).
2024-01-	Win	(Italy) Elena Cardoni	2024 WAKO European Cup – Semifinal	Athens, Greece	Decision (3:0)	3	2:00
2024-01-28	Win	(Hungary) Viktória Dóra Bálint-Pálfi	2024 WAKO European Cup – Final	Athens, Greece	KO	3	2:00
Wins the 2024 WAKO European Cup (K-1, −52 kg).
2023-11-21	Win	(Azerbaijan) Fatma Rajabzade Shahbandlu	2023 WAKO World Championship – Round of 16	Albufeira, Portugal	Decision (3:0)	3	2:00
2023-11-23	Loss	(Ukraine) Daryna Ivanova	2023 WAKO World Championship – Quarterfinal	Albufeira, Portugal	Decision (3:0)	3	2:00
5th place at the 2023 WAKO World Championship (K-1, −52 kg).
2023-06	Win	(Bosnia and Herzegovina) Sirin Biščević	28th Hungarian Kickboxing World Cup 2023 – Round of 16	Budapest, Hungary	Decision	3	2:00
2023-06	Win	(Hungary) Zsófia Nagy	28th Hungarian Kickboxing World Cup 2023 – Quarterfinal	Budapest, Hungary	Decision	3	2:00
2023-06	Win	(Finland) Niina Ojonen	28th Hungarian Kickboxing World Cup 2023 – Semifinal	Budapest, Hungary	Decision	2	2:00
2023-06	Win	(Ukraine) Daryna Ivanova	28th Hungarian Kickboxing World Cup 2023 – Final	Budapest, Hungary	Decision	3	2:00
Wins the 28th Hungarian Kickboxing World Cup 2023 (K-1, −52 kg).
2022-11	Win	(Estonia) Aleksandra Dzhikaeva	2022 WAKO European Championship – Semifinal	Antalya, Turkey	Decision (3:0)	3	2:00
2022-11	Loss	(Turkey) Zeynep Çetintaş	2022 WAKO European Championship – Final	Antalya, Turkey	Decision (2:1)	3	2:00
Wins the 2022 WAKO European Championship Silver Medal (K-1, −48 kg).
2022-07	Win	(Uzbekistan) Shirinoy Zokhidova	Uzbekistan Open-2 2022 – Quarterfinal	Tashkent, Uzbekistan	Decision (3:0)	3	2:00
2022-07	Win	(South Korea) Im Yugyeon	Uzbekistan Open-2 2022 – Semifinal	Tashkent, Uzbekistan	Decision (3:1)	3	2:00
2022-07	Win	(Turkey) Derya Kirmizigul	Uzbekistan Open-2 2022 – Final	Tashkent, Uzbekistan	Decision (3:0)	3	2:00
Wins the 2022 Uzbekistan Open-2 Gold Medal (K-1, −48 kg).
2022-06	Win	(Poland) Kamila Golebiewska	27th Hungarian Kickboxing World Cup 2022 – Semifinal	Budapest, Hungary	Decision (3:0)	3	2:00
2022-06	Win	(Poland) Dominika Chylinska	27th Hungarian Kickboxing World Cup 2022 – Final	Budapest, Hungary	Decision (3:0)	3	2:00
Wins the 2022 27th Hungarian Kickboxing World Cup (K-1, −48 kg) Gold Medal.
2022-05	Win	(Turkey) Seyma Denktas	7th Turkish International Open Kickboxing World Cup 2022 – Quarterfinal	Istanbul, Turkey	Decision (3:0)	3	2:00
2022-05	Win	(Slovakia) Lucia Feckova	7th Turkish International Open Kickboxing World Cup 2022 – Semifinal	Istanbul, Turkey	Decision (3:0)	3	2:00
2022-05	Loss	(Tajikistan) Fatima Begmuradova	7th Turkish International Open Kickboxing World Cup 2022 – Final	Istanbul, Turkey	Decision (0:3)	3	2:00
Wins the Silver Medal at the 7th Turkish International Open Kickboxing World Cup 2022 (KL, −55 kg).
2022-05	Loss	(Turkey) Duygu Turan	7th Turkish International Open Kickboxing World Cup 2022 – Round of 16	Istanbul, Turkey	Decision (0:3)	3	2:00
5th place at the 7th Turkish International Open Kickboxing World Cup 2022 (KL, −50 kg).
2022-05	Win	(Turkey) Celik Hacer Kadriye	7th Turkish International Open Kickboxing World Cup 2022 – Quarterfinal	Istanbul, Turkey	Decision	3	2:00
2022-05	Loss	(Turkey) Saglam Sultan	7th Turkish International Open Kickboxing World Cup 2022 – Semifinal	Istanbul, Turkey	Decision	0	2:00
Bronze medal at the 7th Turkish International Open Kickboxing World Cup 2022 (LC, −55 kg).
2022-05	Loss	(Slovenia) Tyra Barada	7th Turkish International Open Kickboxing World Cup 2022 – Round of 16	Istanbul, Turkey	Decision	0	2:00
Bronze medal at the 7th Turkish International Open Kickboxing World Cup 2022 (LC, −50 kg).
2022-03-18	Win	(Serbia) Marta Vucic	Serbia Open — WAKO European Cup 2022, Final	Kraljevo, Serbia	Decision	3	2:00
Wins the Serbia Open — WAKO European Cup 2022 (K-1, −48 kg).
2022-03-18	Win	(North Macedonia) Andrea Kostovska	Serbia Open — WAKO European Cup 2022, Final	Kraljevo, Serbia	Decision	3	2:00
Wins the Serbia Open — WAKO European Cup 2022 (KL, −55 kg).
2022-03-18	Win	(North Macedonia) Lea Boshevska	Serbia Open — WAKO European Cup 2022, Final	Kraljevo, Serbia	Decision	3	2:00
Wins the Serbia Open — WAKO European Cup 2022 (KL, −50 kg).
2021-10-	Loss	(Russia) Diana Doktugu	2021 WAKO World Championship, Quarterfinal	Jesolo, Italy	Decision (2:1)	3	2:00
5th place at the 2021 WAKO World Championship (K-1, −48 kg).
2021-09-18	Win	(Poland) Kamila Golebiewska	26th Hungarian Kickboxing World Cup 2021, Semifinal	Budapest, Hungary	Decision	3	2:00
2021-09-19	Win	(Poland) Dominika Chylinska	26th Hungarian Kickboxing World Cup 2021, Final	Budapest, Hungary	Decision	3	2:00
Wins the 2021 26th Hungarian Kickboxing World Cup (K-1, −48 kg).
2021-05-28	Loss	(Ukraine) Mariya Belkina	European Cup Karlovac Open 2021 – Quarterfinal	Karlovac, Croatia	Decision	3	2:00
5th place at the 2021 European Cup Karlovac Open (K-1, −52 kg).
2019-10-	Win	(Ukraine) Hanna Dubyna	2019 WAKO World Championship, Quarterfinal	Sarajevo, Bosnia and Herzegovina	Decision (3:0)	3	2:00
2019-10-	Win	(Belarus) Liudmila Chyslova	2019 WAKO World Championship, Semifinal	Sarajevo, Bosnia and Herzegovina	Decision (3:0)	3	2:00
2019-10-	Win	(Czech Republic) Klára Strnadová	2019 WAKO World Championship, Final	Sarajevo, Bosnia and Herzegovina	Decision (2:1)	3	2:00
Wins the 2019 WAKO World Championship K-1 (−48 kg) Gold Medal.
2018-10-11	Win	(Turkey) Zekiye Zelal Sengur	2018 WAKO European Championship, Quarterfinal	Bratislava, Slovakia	Decision (2:1)	3	2:00
2018-10-12	Loss	(France) Myriam Djedidi	2018 WAKO European Championship, Semifinal	Bratislava, Slovakia	Decision (0:3)	3	2:00
Bronze Medal at the 2018 WAKO European Championship K-1 (−48 kg).
2018-06-	Win	(Italy) Francesca Tentorio	Bestfighter World Cup 2018, Semifinal	Rimini, Italy	KO	1	1:30
2018-06-	Win	(Italy) Elena Cardoni	Bestfighter World Cup 2018, Final	Rimini, Italy	Decision	3	2:00
Wins the Bestfighter World Cup 2018 K-1 (−48 kg).
2017-11-02	Win	(Republic of Ireland) Emma Dignam	2017 WAKO World Championship, Round of 16	Budapest, Hungary	Decision	3	2:00
2017-11-03	Win	(Guatemala) Valery Castaneda	2017 WAKO World Championship, Quarterfinal	Budapest, Hungary	Decision	3	2:00
2017-11-04	Loss	(Hungary) Gabriella Busa	2017 WAKO World Championship, Semifinal	Budapest, Hungary	Decision	3	2:00
Bronze Medal at the 2017 WAKO World Championship K-1 (−50 kg).
2017-09-08	Win	(Ukraine) Diana Shkvarok	2017 WAKO Junior European Championships – Quarterfinal (K-1, −50 kg)	Skopje, North Macedonia	Decision (3:0)	3	2:00
2017-09-09	Win	(Greece) Romalea Mesindianou	2017 WAKO Junior European Championships – Semifinal (K-1, −50 kg)	Skopje, North Macedonia	Decision (3:0)	3	2:00
2017-09-10	Win	(Poland) Paulina Turulska	2017 WAKO Junior European Championships – Final (K-1, −50 kg)	Skopje, North Macedonia	Decision (3:0)	3	2:00
Wins the 2017 WAKO Junior European Championship K-1 (−50 kg) Gold Medal.
2016-09-01	Loss	(Poland) Roksana Dargiel	2016 WAKO Junior World Championships – Semifinal (K-1, −52 kg)	Dublin, Ireland	Decision	3	2:00
Bronze medal at the 2016 WAKO Junior World Championships (K-1, −52 kg).
2016-05-14	Win	(Moldova) Viktoria Makari	2016 WAKO Junior World Cup – Semifinal (K-1, −52 kg)	Budapest, Hungary	Decision	3	2:00
2016-05-15	Win	(Mauritania) Ummu Mint Mohamed Cheikhna	2016 WAKO Junior World Cup – Final (K-1, −52 kg)	Budapest, Hungary	Decision	3	2:00
Wins the 2016 WAKO Junior World Cup Gold Medal (K-1, −52 kg).
Legend: Win Loss Draw/No contest Notes

== Championships and accomplishments ==
=== Amateur kickboxing ===
==== World Association of Kickboxing Organizations ====
- 2016 Junior World Cup K-1 (−52 kg) (gold)
- 2016 Cadets & Juniors World Championship K-1 (−52 kg) (bronze)
- 2017 European Junior Championship K-1 (−50 kg) (gold)
- 2017 World Championship K-1 (−50 kg) (bronze)
- 2018 Bestfighter World Cup K-1 (−48 kg) (gold)
- 2018 European Championship K-1 (−48 kg) (bronze)
- 2019 World Championship K-1 (−48 kg) (gold)
- 2021 26th Hungarian Kickboxing World Cup K-1 (−48 kg) (gold)
- 2022 Serbia Open – European Cup K-1 (−48 kg) (gold)
- 2022 Serbia Open – European Cup KL (−55 kg) (gold)
- 2022 Serbia Open – European Cup KL (−50 kg) (gold)
- 2022 Turkish Open Kickboxing World Cup KL (−55 kg) (silver)
- 2022 Turkish Open Kickboxing World Cup LC (−55 kg) (bronze)
- 2022 Turkish Open Kickboxing World Cup LC (−50 kg) (bronze)
- 2022 27th Hungarian Kickboxing World Cup K-1 (−48 kg) (gold)
- 2022 Uzbekistan Open-2 K-1 (−48 kg) (gold)
- 2022 European Championship K-1 (−48 kg) (silver)
- 2023 28th Hungarian Kickboxing World Cup K-1 (−52 kg) (gold)
- 2024 European Cup – Athens K-1 (−52 kg) (gold)
- 2024 European Cup Zagreb Open K-1 (−52 kg) (gold)
- 2024 Italian World Cup K-1 (−52 kg) (silver)
- 2024 29th Hungarian Kickboxing World Cup K-1 (−52 kg) (bronze)
- 2024 European Championship K-1 (−52 kg) (gold)
- 2025 Athens Challenge European Cup K-1 (−52 kg) (gold)
- 2025 Italian World Cup K-1 (−52 kg) (silver)
- 2025 1st Thailand Kickboxing World Cup K-1 (−52 kg) (gold)
- 2025 30th Hungarian Kickboxing World Cup K-1 (−52 kg) (gold)
- 2025 WAKO World Kickboxing Championships K-1 (−52 kg) (gold)

==== World Games ====
- 2025 World Games K-1 (−52 kg) (gold)

== Professional kickboxing record ==
Professional Kickboxing record
Date	Result	Opponent	Event	Location	Method	Round	Time
2018-07-07	Win	(Israel) Julie Levy	IMC	Ashdod, Israel	KO (Knee and punches)	1	
Legend: Win Loss Draw/No contest Notes

== Mixed martial arts record ==
Professional record breakdown
2 matches	0 wins	2 losses
By knockout	0	2

Res.	Record	Opponent	Method	Event	Date	Round	Time	Location	Notes
Loss	0–2	Viktoria Makarova	TKO (punches)	Bellator 209	November 15, 2018	2	3:26	Tel Aviv, Israel	
Loss	0–1	Sylwia Juśkiewicz	TKO (knees and punches)	Ladies Fight Night 8	December 16, 2017	2	3:26	Łódź, Poland	strawweight debut.

== Recognition ==
In 2017, Sachkov received the “Israeli Young Athlete of the Year” award from the Israeli Minister of Culture and Sport, Miri Regev, for her sporting achievements.

In 2020, following her victory in remotely held competitions during the COVID-19 restrictions, she was recognized as “the most athletic female athlete in Israel.”
