= United Arab Emirates at the 2025 World Games =

- IOC code: UAE
- NOC: United Arab Emirates National Olympic Committee

in Chengdu, China 7 August 2025 – 17 August 2025
- Competitors: 10 (5 men and 5 women) in 4 sports and 11 events
- Medals Ranked 40th: Gold 1 Silver 2 Bronze 1 Total 4

World Games appearances
- 1981; 1985; 1989; 1993; 1997; 2001; 2005; 2009; 2013; 2017; 2022; 2025

United Arab Emirates competed at the 2025 World Games held in Chengdu, China from 7 to 17 August 2025.

Athletes representing United Arab Emirates won one gold medal, two silver medals and one bronze medal. The country finished in 40th place in the medal table.

== Medalists ==
Medal	Name	Sport	Event	Date
Gold	Saeed Alkubaisi	Ju-jitsu	Men's 85 kg Ne-Waza	11 August
Silver	Ali Alsuwaidi	Ju-jitsu	Men's 69 kg Ne-Waza	11 August
Silver	Mahdi Alawlaqi	Ju-jitsu	Men's 77 kg Ne-Waza	11 August
Bronze	Ali Alsuwaidi	Ju-jitsu	Men's open Ne-Waza	12 August

== Competitors ==
The following is the list of number of competitors in the Games.

Sport	Men	Women	Total
Billards	1	0	1
Ju-jitsu	3	3	6
Muaythai	1	0	1
Triathlon	0	2	2
Total	5	5	11
